= List of World Heritage Sites in Asia and the Pacific =

The United Nations Educational, Scientific and Cultural Organization (UNESCO) designates World Heritage Sites of outstanding universal value to cultural or natural heritage which have been nominated by signatories to the 1972 UNESCO World Heritage Convention. Cultural heritage consists of monuments (such as architectural works, monumental sculptures, or inscriptions), groups of buildings, and sites (including archaeological sites). Natural heritage includes natural features (consisting of physical and biological formations), geological and physiographical formations (including habitats of threatened species of animals and plants), and natural sites that are important from the point of view of science, conservation or natural beauty. UNESCO lists sites under ten criteria; each entry must meet at least one of the criteria. Criteria i through vi are cultural, and vii through x are natural. The implementation of the World Heritage Convention, the addition or removal of properties from the World Heritage List, and the allocation of funds, among other responsibilities, are managed by the World Heritage Committee. There are twenty-one state members on the committee. Although a term is a maximum of six years, most state parties choose to relinquish their responsibilities after four years so other countries can have the opportunity to be a member of the committee.

Asia and the Pacific is one of the five regions defined by UNESCO, alongside Africa, the Arab States, Europe and North America, and Latin America and the Caribbean. It consists of 46 nations from Asia and Oceania that have accepted the World Heritage Convention, making their historical sites eligible for inclusion on the list as World Heritage sites. The region has 315 properties on the World Heritage List. Of those properties, 229 were inscribed for their cultural significance, 73 for their natural significance, and 13 for both their natural and cultural significance–being termed mixed sites. (Note: The included reference shows 228 cultural sites, but it does not include The Architectural Work of Le Corbusier, a transnational site which is counted as a part of the Europe and North America region.) There are currently 6 World Heritage Sites in Asia and the Pacific that are endangered.

In addition to sites inscribed on the World Heritage List, member states can maintain a list of tentative sites that they may consider for nomination. Nominations for the World Heritage List are only accepted if the site was previously listed on the tentative list. The Asia and the Pacific region has 517 properties on the tentative list.

Location of World Heritage Sites in Asia.	Location of World Heritage Sites in Oceania.
Map key: Red dots represent cultural sites, green triangles represent natural sites, and blue squares represent mixed sites.

Asia and the Pacific state parties by World Heritage Sites and criteria, tentative listings, and World Heritage Committee service
State	Cultural	Natural	Mixed	Total	Tentative	Service on World Heritage Committee	Date joined	Ref
Afghanistan	2	0	0	2	4	0 times	20 March 1979	
Australia	5	12	4	21	8	5 times	22 August 1974	
Bangladesh	2	1	0	3	7	1 times	3 August 1983	
Bhutan	0	0	0	0	8	0 times	22 October 2001	
Brunei	0	0	0	0	0	0 times	12 August 2011	
Cambodia	5	0	0	5	6	1 times	28 November 1991	
China	42	15	4	61	60	4 times	12 December 1985	
Cook Islands	0	0	0	0	1	0 times	16 January 2009	
Fiji	1	0	0	1	3	0 times	21 November 1990	
India	37	7	1	45	81	4 times	14 November 1977	
Indonesia	6	4	0	10	21	2 times	6 July 1989	
Iran	28	2	0	30	57	1 times	26 February 1975	
Japan	22	5	0	27	3	4 times	30 June 1992	
Kazakhstan	4	3	0	7	15	2 times	29 April 1994	
Kiribati	0	1	0	1	0	0 times	12 May 2000	
Kyrgyzstan	2	1	0	3	3	1 times	3 July 1995	
Laos	3	1	0	4	2	0 times	20 March 1987	
Malaysia	4	2	0	6	3	1 times	7 December 1988	
Maldives	0	0	0	0	1	0 times	22 May 1986	
Marshall Islands	1	0	0	1	3	0 times	24 April 2002	
Micronesia	1	0	0	1	1	0 times	22 July 2002	
Mongolia	5	2	0	7	11	1 times	2 February 1990	
Myanmar	2	0	0	2	15	0 times	29 April 1994	
Nauru	0	0	0	0	0	0 times	22 July 2024	
Nepal	2	2	0	4	15	1 times	20 June 1978	
New Zealand	0	2	1	3	8	1 times	22 November 1984	
Niue	0	0	0	0	0	0 times	23 January 2001	
North Korea	2	0	1	3	5	0 times	21 July 1998	
Pakistan	6	0	0	6	37	2 times	23 July 1976	
Palau	0	0	1	1	4	0 times	11 June 2002	
Papua New Guinea	1	0	0	1	7	0 times	28 July 1997	
Philippines	3	3	0	6	25	2 times	19 September 1985	
Samoa	0	0	0	0	2	0 times	28 August 2001	
Singapore	1	0	0	1	1	0 times	19 June 2012	
Solomon Islands	0	1	0	1	2	0 times	10 June 1992	
South Korea	15	2	0	17	12	4 times	14 September 1988	
Sri Lanka	6	2	0	8	6	1 times	6 June 1980	
Tajikistan	3	2	0	5	18	0 times	28 August 1992	
Thailand	6	3	0	9	6	4 times	17 September 1987	
Timor-Leste	0	0	0	0	0	0 times	31 October 2016	
Tonga	0	0	0	0	2	0 times	30 April 2004	
Turkmenistan	4	1	0	5	9	0 times	30 September 1994	
Tuvalu	0	0	0	0	1	0 times	18 May 2023	
Uzbekistan	6	2	0	8	30	0 times	13 January 1993	
Vanuatu	1	0	0	1	5	0 times	13 June 2002	
Vietnam	6	2	1	9	9	2 times	19 October 1987	

== Afghanistan ==
=== World Heritage Sites ===
- Minaret and Archaeological Remains of Jam
- Cultural Landscape and Archaeological Remains of the Bamiyan Valley

=== Tentative list ===
- City of Herat
- City of Balkh (antique Bactria)
- Band-E-Amir
- Bagh-e Babur

== Australia ==
=== World Heritage Sites ===
- Kakadu National Park
- Great Barrier Reef
- Willandra Lakes Region
- Tasmanian Wilderness
- Lord Howe Island Group
- Gondwana Rainforests of Australia
- Uluṟu-Kata Tjuṯa National Park
- Wet Tropics of Queensland
- Shark Bay, Western Australia
- K'gari
- Australian Fossil Mammal Sites (Riversleigh / Naracoorte)
- Heard and McDonald Islands
- Macquarie Island
- Greater Blue Mountains Area
- Purnululu National Park
- Royal Exhibition Building and Carlton Gardens
- Sydney Opera House
- Australian Convict Sites
- Ningaloo Coast
- Budj Bim Cultural Landscape
- Murujuga Cultural Landscape

=== Tentative list ===
- Great Sandy World Heritage Area
- The Gondwana Rainforests of Australia World Heritage Area (extension to existing property)
- Flinders Ranges
- Parramatta Female Factory and Institutions Precinct
- Workers' Assembly Halls (Australia)
- Cultural Landscapes of Cape York Peninsula
- Australian Cornish Mining Sites: Burra and Moonta
- Victorian Goldfields

== Bangladesh ==
=== World Heritage Sites ===
- Historic Mosque City of Bagerhat
- Ruins of the Buddhist Vihara at Paharpur
- The Sundarbans

=== Tentative list ===
- Archaeological Sites on the Deltaic Landscape of Bangladesh
- Archaeological sites of Lalmai-Mainamati
- Cultural Landscape of Mahasthan and Karatoya River
- Mughal Mosques in Bangladesh
- Mughal and Colonial Temples of Bangladesh
- The Architectural Works of Muzharul Islam: an Outstanding Contribution to the Modern Movement in South Asia
- Mughal Forts on Fluvial Terrains in Dhaka

== Bhutan ==
=== World Heritage Sites ===
As of 2026, Bhutan does not have any sites inscribed on the World Heritage List.

=== Tentative list ===
- Ancient Ruin of Drukgyel Dzong
- Dzongs: the centre of temporal and religious authorities (Punakha Dzong, Wangdue Phodrang Dzong, Paro Dzong, Trongsa Dzong and Dagana Dzong)
- Sacred Sites associated with Phajo Drugom Zhigpo and his descendants
- Tamzhing Monastery
- Royal Manas National Park (RMNP)
- Jigme Dorji National Park (JDNP)
- Bumdeling Wildlife Sanctuary
- Sakteng Wildlife Sanctuary (SWS)

== Brunei ==
As of 2026, Brunei has no sites on the World Heritage List or its tentative list.

== Cambodia ==
=== World Heritage Sites ===
- Angkor
- Temple of Preah Vihear
- Temple Zone of Sambor Prei Kuk, Archaeological Site of Ancient Ishanapura
- Koh Ker: Archeological Site of Ancient Lingapura or Chork Gargyar
- Cambodian Memorial Sites: From centres of repression to places of peace and reflection

=== Tentative list ===
- The site of Angkor Borei and Phnom Da
- The Archeological Complex of Banteay Chhmar
- Beng Mealea Temple
- Ancient City of Oudong
- Phnom Kulen: Archeological Site/ Ancient Site of Mahendraparvata
- The ancient complex of Preah Khan Kompong Svay

== China ==
=== World Heritage Sites ===
- Mount Taishan
- The Great Wall
- Imperial Palaces of the Ming and Qing Dynasties in Beijing and Shenyang
- Mogao Caves
- Mausoleum of the First Qin Emperor
- Peking Man Site at Zhoukoudian
- Mount Huangshan
- Jiuzhaigou Valley Scenic and Historic Interest Area
- Huanglong Scenic and Historic Interest Area
- Wulingyuan Scenic and Historic Interest Area
- Mountain Resort and its Outlying Temples, Chengde
- Temple and Cemetery of Confucius and the Kong Family Mansion in Qufu
- Ancient Building Complex in the Wudang Mountains
- Historic Ensemble of the Potala Palace, Lhasa
- Lushan National Park
- Mount Emei Scenic Area, including Leshan Giant Buddha Scenic Area
- Old Town of Lijiang
- Ancient City of Ping Yao
- Classical Gardens of Suzhou
- Summer Palace, an Imperial Garden in Beijing
- Temple of Heaven: an Imperial Sacrificial Altar in Beijing
- Mount Wuyi
- Dazu Rock Carvings
- Mount Qingcheng and the Dujiangyan Irrigation System
- Ancient Villages in Southern Anhui – Xidi and Hongcun
- Longmen Grottoes
- Imperial Tombs of the Ming and Qing Dynasties
- Yungang Grottoes
- Three Parallel Rivers of Yunnan Protected Areas
- Capital Cities and Tombs of the Ancient Koguryo Kingdom
- Historic Centre of Macao
- Yin Xu
- Sichuan Giant Panda Sanctuaries - Wolong, Mt Siguniang and Jiajin Mountains
- Kaiping Diaolou and Villages
- South China Karst
- Fujian Tulou
- Mount Sanqingshan National Park
- Mount Wutai
- Historic Monuments of Dengfeng in "The Centre of Heaven and Earth"
- China Danxia
- West Lake Cultural Landscape of Hangzhou
- Chengjiang Fossil Site
- Site of Xanadu
- Xinjiang Tianshan
- Cultural Landscape of Honghe Hani Rice Terraces
- Silk Roads: the Routes Network of Chang'an-Tianshan Corridor
- The Grand Canal
- Tusi Sites
- Zuojiang Huashan Rock Art Cultural Landscape
- Hubei Shennongjia
- Qinghai Hoh Xil
- Kulangsu: a Historic International Settlement
- Fanjingshan
- Archaeological ruins of Liangzhu City
- Migratory Bird Sanctuaries along the Coast of Yellow Sea-Bohai Gulf of China
- Quanzhou: Emporium of the World in Song-Yuan China
- Cultural Landscape of Old Tea Forests of the Jingmai Mountain in Pu'er
- Badain Jaran Desert - Towers of Sand and Lakes
- Beijing Central Axis: A Building Ensemble Exhibiting the Ideal Order of the Chinese Capital
- Xixia Imperial Tombs
- Jingdezhen Handicraft Porcelain Industry Sites

=== Tentative list ===
- Dongzhai Port Nature Reserve
- The Alligator Sinensis Nature Reserve
- Poyang Nature Reserve
- The Lijiang River Scenic Zone at Guilin
- Yalong, Tibet
- Yangtze Gorges Scenic Spot
- Jinfushan Scenic Spot
- Heaven Pit and Ground Seam Scenic Spot
- Hua Shan Scenic Area
- Yandang Mountain
- Nanxi River
- Maijishan Scenic Spots
- Wudalianchi Scenic Spots
- Haitan Scenic Spots
- Dali Cangshan Mountain and Erhai Lake Scenic Spot
- Sites for Liquor Making in China
- Ancient Residences in Shanxi and Shaanxi Provinces (Dingcun and Dangjiacun villages)
- City Walls of the Ming and Qing Dynasties
- Slender West Lake and Historic Urban Area in Yangzhou
- The Ancient Waterfront Towns in the South of Yangtze River
- Chinese Section of the Silk Road: Land routes in Henan, Shaanxi, Gansu, Qinghai, Ningxia, and Xinjiang; Sea Routes in Ningbo, and Quanzhou City, Fujian Province - from Western-Han Dynasty to Qing Dynasty
- Fenghuang Ancient City
- Sites of the Southern Yue State
- Baiheliang Ancient Hydrological Inscription
- Miao Nationality Villages in Southeast Guizhou Province: The villages of Miao Nationality at the Foot of Leigong Mountain in Miao Ling Mountains
- Karez Wells
- Expansion Project of Imperial Tombs of the Ming and Qing Dynasties: King Lujian's Tombs
- The Four Sacred Mountains as an extension of Mt. Taishan
- Taklimakan Desert–Populus euphratica Forests
- China Altay
- Karakorum–Pamir
- Wooden Structures of Liao Dynasty – Wooden Pagoda of Yingxian County, Main Hall of Fengguo Monastery of Yixian County
- Sites of Hongshan Culture: The Niuheliang Archaeological Site, the Hongshanhou Archaeological Site, and Weijiawopu Archaeological Site
- Ancient Porcelain Kiln Site in China
- SanFangQiXiang
- Dong Villages
- Lingqu Canal
- Diaolou Buildings and Villages for Tibetan and Qiang Ethnic Groups
- Archaeological Sites of the Ancient Shu State: Site at Jinsha and Joint Tombs of Boat-shaped Coffins in Chengdu City, Sichuan Province; Site of Sanxingdui in Guanghan City, Sichuan Province 29C.BC-5C.BC
- Xinjiang Yardang
- Dunhuang Yardangs
- Tianzhushan
- Jinggangshan–North Wuyishan (Extension of Mount Wuyi)
- ShuDao
- Tulin–Guge Scenic and Historic Interest Areas
- The Chinese Section of the Silk Roads
- Guancen Mountain – Luya Mountain
- Hulun Buir Landscape & Birthplace of Ancient Minority
- Qinghai Lake
- Scenic and historic area of Sacred Mountains and Lakes
- Taihang Mountain
- Vertical Vegetation Landscape and Volcanic Landscape in Changbai Mountain
- Guizhou Triassic Fossil Sites
- Huangguoshu Scenic Area
- Hainan Tropical Rainforest and the Traditional Settlement of Li Ethnic Group
- Fujian Minjiang River Estuary: The ecotone between marine and terrestrial biogeographical regions
- Hezheng Mammalian Fossil Sites of Gansu
- Guizhou Shuanghe Cave
- Zhangye Colorful Hills
- Jehol Biota Fossil Sites in Chaoyang

== Cook Islands ==
=== World Heritage Sites ===
As of 2026, the Cook Islands do not have any sites inscribed on the World Heritage List.

=== Tentative list ===
- Maungaroa Cultural Landscape

== Fiji ==
=== World Heritage Sites ===
- Levuka Historical Port Town

=== Tentative list ===
- Sovi Basin
- Sigatoka Sand Dunes
- Yaduataba Crested Iguana Sanctuary

== India ==
=== World Heritage Sites ===
- Ajanta Caves
- Ellora Caves
- Agra Fort
- Taj Mahal
- Konark Sun Temple
- Group of Monuments at Mahabalipuram
- Kaziranga National Park
- Manas Wildlife Sanctuary
- Keoladeo National Park
- Churches and Convents of Goa
- Khajuraho Group of Monuments
- Group of Monuments at Hampi
- Fatehpur Sikri
- Group of Monuments at Pattadakal
- Elephanta Caves
- Great Living Chola Temples
- Sundarbans National Park
- Nanda Devi and Valley of Flowers National Parks
- Buddhist Monuments at Sanchi
- Humayun's Tomb
- Qutb Minar complex
- Mountain Railways of India
- Mahabodhi Temple Complex at Bodh Gaya
- Rock Shelters of Bhimbetka
- Chhatrapati Shivaji Terminus (formerly Victoria Terminus)
- Champaner-Pavagadh Archaeological Park
- Red Fort Complex
- Jantar Mantar, Jaipur
- Western Ghats
- Hill Forts of Rajasthan
- Rani-ki-Vav (the Queen's Stepwell) at Patan, Gujarat
- Great Himalayan National Park Conservation Area
- Archaeological Site of Nalanda Mahavihara at Nalanda, Bihar
- Khangchendzonga National Park
- The Architectural Work of Le Corbusier, an Outstanding Contribution to the Modern Movement
- Historic City of Ahmadabad
- Victorian Gothic and Art Deco Ensembles of Mumbai
- Jaipur City, Rajasthan
- Kakatiya Rudreshwara (Ramappa) Temple, Telangana
- Dholavira: a Harappan City
- Santiniketan
- Sacred Ensembles of the Hoysalas
- Moidams – the Mound-Burial system of the Ahom Dynasty
- Maratha Military Landscapes of India
- Ancient Buddhist Site of Sarnath

=== Tentative list ===
- Temples at Bishnupur, West Bengal
- Mattancherry Palace, Ernakulam, Kerala
- Group of Monuments at Mandu, Madhya Pradesh
- Sri Harimandir Sahib, Amritsar, Punjab
- River Island of Majuli in midstream of Brahmaputra River in Assam
- Namdapha National Park
- Wild Ass Sanctuary, Little Rann of Kutch
- Neora Valley National Park
- Desert National Park
- Silk Road Sites in India
- The Qutb Shahi Monuments of Hyderabad Golconda Fort, Qutb Shahi Tombs, Charminar
- Mughal gardens in Kashmir
- Delhi - A Heritage City
- Monuments and Forts of the Deccan Sultanate
- Cellular Jail, Andaman Islands
- Iconic Saree Weaving Clusters of India
- Apatani Cultural Landscape
- Sri Ranganathaswamy Temple, Srirangam
- Monuments of Srirangapatna Island Town
- Chilika Lake
- Padmanabhapuram Palace
- Sites of Satyagrah, India's non-violent freedom movement
- Thembang Fortified Village
- Narcondam Island
- Ekamra Kshetra – The Temple City, Bhubaneswar
- The Neolithic Settlement of Burzahom
- Archaeological remains of a Harappa Port-Town, Lothal
- Mountain Railways of India (Extension)
- Chettinad, Village Clusters of the Tamil Merchants
- Bahá'í House of Worship at Delhi
- Evolution of Temple Architecture – Aihole-Badami-Pattadakal
- Cold Desert Cultural Landscape of India
- Sites along the Uttarapath, Badshahi Sadak, Sadak-e-Azam, Grand Trunk Road
- Keibul Lamjao Conservation Area
- Garo Hills Conservation Area (GHCA)
- The historic ensemble of Orchha
- Iconic Riverfront of the Historic City of Varanasi
- Temples of Kanchipuram
- Hire Benakal, Megalithic Site
- Bhedaghat-Lametaghat in Narmada Valley
- Satpura Tiger Reserve
- Geoglyphs of Konkan Region of India
- Jingkieng jri: Living Root Bridge Cultural Landscapes
- Sri Veerabhadra Temple and Monolithic Bull (Nandi), Lepakshi (The Vijayanagara Sculpture and Painting Art Tradition)
- Sun Temple, Modhera and its adjoining monuments
- Rock-cut Sculptures and Reliefs of the Unakoti, Unakoti Range, Unakoti District
- Vadnagar – A multi-layered Historic town, Gujarat
- Serial nomination of Coastal Fortifications along the Konkan Coast, Maharashtra
- Gwalior Fort, Madhya Pradesh
- Khooni Bhandara, Burhanpur
- Rock Art Sites of the Chambal Valley
- The Bhojeshwar Mahadev Temple, Bhojpur
- The Gond people monuments of Ramnagar, Mandla
- The historic ensemble of Dhamnar
- Kanger Valley National Park
- Mudumal Megalithic Menhirs
- Serial nomination for Ashokan Edict sites along the Mauryan Routes
- Serial nomination of Chausath Yogini Temples
- Serial nomination of Gupta Temples in North India
- The Palace-Fortresses of the Bundelas
- Salkhan Fossil Park, Sonbhadra
- Naga Hill Ophiolite
- Deccan Traps at Panchgani and Mahabaleshwar
- Geological Heritage of St' Mary's Island Cluster
- Meghalayan Age Caves
- Natural Heritage of Erra Matti Dibbalu
- Natural Heritage of Tirumala Hills
- Natural Heritage of Varkala
- Serial Nomination of Buddhist Triangle Sites of Odisha
- Nicobarese Cultural Continuity in the Central group of Nicobar Islands
- Colonial Penal Settlement of Andaman Islands
- The Painted Haveli Towns of Shekhawati
- Rangpur-Sivasagar Historic Ensemble
- The Sites of Satyagraha: The Emergence and institutionalization of the non-violent movement
- Bagh Cave paintings
- Ginnorgarh fort
- Group of Temples of the Chambal valley: Bateshwar, Padavali and Kakarmath
- Udayagiri Caves
- Karst-mud-volcano Complex of Baratang
- Andaman Subduction Volcanoes
- Sirpur Cultural and Archaeological Landscape

== Indonesia ==
=== World Heritage Sites ===
- Borobudur Temple Compounds
- Cosmological Axis of Yogyakarta and its Historic Landmarks
- Cultural Landscape of Bali Province: the Subak System as a Manifestation of the Tri Hita Karana Philosophy
- Komodo National Park
- Lorentz National Park
- Prambanan Temple Compounds
- Ombilin Coal Mining Heritage of Sawahlunto
- Sangiran Early Man Site
- Tropical Rainforest Heritage of Sumatra
- Ujung Kulon National Park

=== Tentative list ===
- Betung Kerihun National Park (Transborder Rainforest Heritage of Borneo)
- Bunaken National Park
- Raja Ampat Islands
- Taka Bonerate National Park
- Wakatobi National Park
- Derawan Islands
- Tana Toraja Traditional Settlement
- Bawomataluo Site
- Muara Takus Compound Site
- Trowulan - Former Capital City of Majapahit Kingdom
- Sangkulirang – Mangkahilat Karts: Prehistoric rock art area
- The Old Town of Jakarta (Formerly old Batavia) and 4 Outlying Islands (Onrust, Kelor, Cipir and Bidadari)
- Semarang Old Town
- Traditional Settlement at Nagari Sijunjung
- The Historic and Marine Landscape of the Banda Islands
- Kebun Raya Bogor
- Tropical Rainforest Heritage of Sumatra – Significant Boundary Modification
- Karst Landscape Maros Pangkep Prehistoric Cave Area
- Megalithic Cultural Heritage of Lore Lindu Area
- Muarajambi Temple Compound
- The Land Below the Wind: Spice Trade Route on XIII-XVIII AD

== Iran ==
=== World Heritage Sites ===
- Armenian Monastic Ensembles of Iran
- Bam and its Cultural Landscape
- Bisotun
- Cultural Landscape of Maymand
- Cultural Landscape of Hawraman/Uramanat
- Gonbad-e Qābus
- Golestan Palace
- Lut Desert
- Sassanid Archaeological Landscape in Fars province (Bishabpur, Firouzabad, Sarvestan)
- Masjed-e Jāmé of Isfahan
- Naqsh-e Jahan Square (Meidan Emam, Esfahan)
- Pasargadae
- Persepolis
- Shahr-e Sukhteh
- Sheikh Safi al-din Khānegāh and Shrine Ensemble in Ardabil
- Shushtar Historical Hydraulic System
- Soltaniyeh
- Susa
- Tabriz Historic Bazaar Complex
- Takht-e Soleyman
- Tchogha Zanbil
- The Persian Garden
- Trans-Iranian Railway
- Persian Qanat
- Historic City of Yazd
- Hyrcanian Forests
- The Persian Caravanserai
- The Persian Garden
- The Prehistoric Sites of the Khorramabad Valley
- Alamūt Castle and Related Fortifications

=== Tentative list ===
- Jame' (Congregational) Mosque of Esfahan
- Historic ensemble of Qasr-e Shirin (Note: This site has 2 different entries in Iran's tentative list.)
- Firuzabad Ensemble
- Shush
- Naqsh-e Rostam and Naqsh-e Rajab
- Tape Sialk
- Taq-e Bostan
- Kuh-e Khuaja
- Persepolis and other relevant buildings
- The Historical–Cultural Axis of Fin, Sialk, Kashan
- Historic Monument of Kangavar
- The Historical City of Maybod
- The Historical Port of Siraf
- Bazaar of Qaisariye in Laar
- The Historical Village of Abyaneh
- Bastam and Kharghan
- The Historical Texture of Damghan
- The Cultural-Natural Landscape of Ramsar
- Kaboud Mosque
- Tous Cultural Landscape
- The Historical City of Masouleh
- The Complex of Izadkhast
- Zozan
- Jiroft
- Ghaznavi- Seljukian Axis in Khorasan
- Qeshm Island
- Arasbaran Protected Area
- Sabalan
- Khabr National Park and Ruchun Wildlife Refuge
- Alisadr Cave
- Silk Route (also as Silk Road)
- The Natural-Historical Landscape of Izeh
- The Zandiyeh Ensemble of Fars Province
- Kerman Historical-Cultural Structure
- The Collection of Historical Bridges
- Touran Biosphere Reserve
- Hamoun Lake
- Harra Protected Area
- Damavand
- Asbads (windmills) of Iran
- Natural-Historical Complex/Cave of Karaftoo
- Imam Reza Holy Complex
- Industrial Heritage of textile in the central Plateau of Iran
- Salt Domes of Iran
- The Great Wall of Gorgan
- The Persian House in Central plateau of Iran
- University of Tehran
- Monastery of St. Amenaprkich (New Julfa Vank)
- Vali-e Asr Street
- Serial Nomination of Tehran's Modern Architectural Heritage
- Chega Sofla (Ritual Landscape of Chega Sofla)
- Architecture of the historical settlements across the northern coasts of Persian Gulf (Siraf, Kong, Laft, Kish and Mokran)
- Cultural Landscape of Kong Historic Port
- Long-lived trees of Iran
- Sheikh Ahmad-e Jām Khaneghah and Mausoleum Complex (Mazar-e Jām)
- Persian Mosque

== Japan ==
=== World Heritage Sites ===
- Buddhist Monuments in the Hōryū-ji Area
- Himeji-jō
- Yakushima
- Shirakami-Sanchi
- Historic Monuments of Ancient Kyoto (Kyoto, Uji and Otsu Cities)
- Historic Villages of Shirakawa-gō and Gokayama
- Hiroshima Peace Memorial (Genbaku Dome)
- Itsukushima Shinto Shrine
- Historic Monuments of Ancient Nara
- Shrines and Temples of Nikkō
- Gusuku Sites and Related Properties of the Kingdom of Ryukyu
- Sacred Sites and Pilgrimage Routes in the Kii Mountain Range
- Shiretoko
- Iwami Ginzan Silver Mine and its Cultural Landscape
- Hiraizumi – Temples, Gardens and Archaeological Sites Representing the Buddhist Pure Land
- Ogasawara Islands
- Fujisan, sacred place and source of artistic inspiration
- Tomioka Silk Mill and Related Sites
- Sites of Japan's Meiji Industrial Revolution: Iron and Steel, Shipbuilding and Coal Mining
- The Architectural Work of Le Corbusier, an Outstanding Contribution to the Modern Movement
- Sacred Island of Okinoshima and Associated Sites in the Munakata Region
- Hidden Christian Sites in the Nagasaki Region
- Mozu-Furuichi Kofungun, Ancient Tumulus Clusters
- Amami-Ōshima Island, Tokunoshima Island, northern part of Okinawa Island, and Iriomote Island
- Jōmon Prehistoric Sites in Northern Japan
- Sado Island Gold Mines
- Ancient Capitals of Asuka and Fujiwara

=== Tentative list ===
- Temples, Shrines and other structures of Ancient Kamakura
- Hikone-jō (castle)
- Hiraizumi – Temples, Gardens and Archaeological Sites Representing the Buddhist Pure Land (extension)

== Kazakhstan ==
=== World Heritage Sites ===
- Mausoleum of Khoja Ahmed Yasawi
- Petroglyphs within the Archaeological Landscape of Tamgaly
- Saryarka – Steppe and Lakes of Northern Kazakhstan
- Silk Roads: the Routes Network of Chang'an-Tianshan Corridor
- Western Tien-Shan
- Cold Winter Deserts of Turan
- Rock Mosques and Associated Sacred Sites of Mangystau

=== Tentative list ===
- Turkic Sanctuary of Merke
- Northern Tyan-Shan (Ile-Alatau State National Park)
- Abylaikit Monastery
- Cultural Landscape of Ulytau
- Silk Roads: Early Period (Prehistory)
- Silk Roads: Fergana-Syrdarya Corridor
- Silk Roads: Volga-Caspian Corridor
- Ustyurt: Natural Landscape and Aran Hunting Traps
- Petroglyphs of Zhetysu (Kulzhabasy, Eshkiolmes, and Bayan-Zhurek)
- Petroglyphs of the Karatau Range (Arpaozen and Sauyskandyk)
- Monumental Monuments and Sanctuaries of the Early Steppe Tradition of Central Eurasia (Mausoleum of Kozy-Korpesh–Bayan Sulu, Ritual Structure Dombauyl, and related "Dyng" Towers)
- Medeu – Complex of Mudflow Protection Engineering Structures
- Architectural Resilience: The Anti-seismic Heritage of Almaty
- Sacred Timber Architecture of Central Asia: Islamic and Christian Traditions at the Turn of the 19th-20th Centuries
- Botai Eneolithic Horse Pastoralist Cultural Landscape

== Kiribati ==
=== World Heritage Sites ===
- Phoenix Islands Protected Area

=== Tentative list ===
As of 2026, Kiribati does not maintain any sites on its tentative list.

== Kyrgyzstan ==
=== World Heritage Sites ===
- Sulaiman-Too Sacred Mountain
- Silk Roads: the Routes Network of Chang'an-Tianshan Corridor
- Western Tien-Shan

=== Tentative list ===
- Saimaly-Tash Petroglyphs
- Silk Roads Sites in Kyrgyzstan
- Silk Roads: Fergana-Syr Darya Corridor

== Laos ==
=== World Heritage Sites ===
- Town of Luang Prabang
- Vat Phou and Associated Ancient Settlements within the Champasak Cultural Landscape
- Megalithic Jar Sites in Xiengkhuang – Plain of Jars
- Phong Nha – Kẻ Bàng National Park and Hin Nam No National Park

=== Tentative list ===
- That Luang of Vientiane
- Nakai-Nam Theun National Park

== Malaysia ==
=== World Heritage Sites ===
- Kinabalu Park
- Gunung Mulu National Park
- Melaka and George Town, Historic Cities of the Straits of Malacca
- Archaeological Heritage of the Lenggong Valley
- Archaeological Heritage of Niah National Park's Caves Complex
- FRIM Selangor Forest Park

=== Tentative list ===
- National Park (Taman Negara) of Peninsular Malaysia
- Gombak Selangor Quartz Ridge
- Sungai Buloh Leprosarium

== Maldives ==
As of 2026, the Maldives do not have any sites on the World Heritage List.

=== Tentative list ===
- Coral Stone Mosques of Maldives

== Marshall Islands ==
=== World Heritage Sites ===
- Bikini Atoll Nuclear Test Site

=== Tentative list ===
- Northern Marshall Islands Atolls
- Likiep Village Historic District
- Mili Atoll Nature Conservancy (and Nadrikdrik)

== Micronesia ==
=== World Heritage Sites ===
- Nan Madol: Ceremonial Centre of Eastern Micronesia

=== Tentative list ===
- Yapese Disk Money Regional Sites

== Mongolia ==
=== World Heritage Sites ===
- Uvs Nuur Basin
- Orkhon Valley Cultural Landscape
- Petroglyphic Complexes of the Mongolian Altai
- Great Burkhan Khaldun Mountain and its surrounding sacred landscape
- Landscapes of Dauria
- Deer Stone Monuments and Related Bronze Age Sites
- The Cemetery Complexes of Xiongnu Nobility

=== Tentative list ===
- Desert Landscapes of the Mongolian Great Gobi
- Cretaceous Dinosaur Fossil Sites in the Mongolian Gobi
- Eastern Mongolian Steppes
- Amarbayasgalant Monastery and its Surrounding Sacred Cultural Landscape
- Baldan Bereeven Monastery and its Sacred Surroundings
- Sacred Binder Mountain and its Associated Cultural Heritage Sites
- Archaeological Site at Khuduu Aral and Surrounding Cultural Landscape
- Petroglyphic Complexes in the Mongolian Gobi
- Highlands of Mongol Altai
- Sacred Mountains of Mongolia
- The Mongolian section of the Great Tea Route

== Myanmar ==
=== World Heritage Sites ===
- Pyu Ancient Cities
- Bagan

=== Tentative list ===
- Wooden Monasteries of Konbaung Period: Ohn Don, Sala, Pakhangyi, Pakhannge, Legaing, Sagu, Shwe-Kyaung (Mandalay)
- Badah-lin and associated caves
- Ancient cities of Upper Myanmar: Innwa, Amarapura, Sagaing, Mingun, Mandalay
- Mrauk-U
- Inle Lake
- Mon cities: Bago, Hanthawaddy
- Ayeyawady River Corridor
- Hkakabo Razi Landscape
- Indawgyi Lake Wildlife Sanctuary
- Natma Taung National Park
- Myeik Archipelago
- Hukaung Valley Wildlife Sanctuary
- Taninthayi Forest Corridor
- Pondaung anthropoid primates palaeontological sites
- Shwedagon Pagoda on Singuttara Hill

== Nauru ==
As of 2026, Nauru has no sites on the World Heritage List or its tentative list.

== Nepal ==
=== World Heritage Sites ===
- Sagarmatha National Park
- Kathmandu Valley
- Chitwan National Park
- Lumbini, the Birthplace of the Lord Buddha

=== Tentative list ===
- The early medieval architectural complex of Panauti
- Tilaurakot, the archaeological remains of ancient Shakya Kingdom
- Cave architecture of Muktinath Valley of Mustang
- The medieval palace complex of Gorkha
- Ramagrama, the relic stupa of Lord Buddha
- Khokana, the vernacular village and its mustard-oil seed industrial heritage
- Medieval Earthen Walled City of Lo Manthang
- Vajrayogini and early settlement of Sankhu
- Medieval Settlement of Kirtipur
- Rishikesh Complex of Ruru Kshetra
- Nuwakot Palace Complex
- Ram Janaki Temple
- The Medieval Town of Tansen
- Sinja Valley
- Bhurti Temple Complex of Dailekh

== New Zealand ==
=== World Heritage Sites ===
- Tongariro National Park
- Te Wahipounamu – South West New Zealand
- New Zealand Sub-Antarctic Islands

=== Tentative list ===
- Auckland volcanic fields
- Waters and seabed of Fiordland (Te Moana O Atawhenua)
- Kahurangi National Park, Farewell Spit and Canaan karst system
- Kerikeri Basin historic precinct
- Kermadec Islands and Marine reserve
- Napier Art Deco historic precinct
- Whakarua Moutere (North East Islands)
- Waitangi Treaty Grounds historic precinct

== Niue ==
As of 2026, Niue has no sites on the World Heritage List or its tentative list.

== North Korea ==
=== World Heritage Sites ===
- Complex of Koguryo Tombs
- Historic Monuments and Sites in Kaesong
- Mount Kumgang – Diamond Mountain from the Sea

=== Tentative list ===
- Mt. Chilbo
- Mt. Myohyang
- Ryongmun Cavern and Songam Cave
- Coastal Wetlands in the West Sea of Korea of the Democratic People’s Republic of Korea
- Historic Relics of Koguryo’s Capital City in Pyongyang

== Pakistan ==
=== World Heritage Sites ===
- Archaeological Ruins at Moenjodaro
- Taxila
- Buddhist Ruins of Takht-i-Bahi and Neighbouring City Remains at Sahr-i-Bahlol
- Historical Monuments at Makli, Thatta
- Fort and Shalimar Gardens in Lahore
- Rohtas Fort

=== Tentative list ===
- Badshahi Mosque, Lahore
- Wazir Khan Mosque, Lahore
- Tombs of Jahangir, Tomb of Asif Khan and Akbari Sarai, Lahore
- Hiran Minar and Tank, Sheikhupura
- Rani Kot Fort, Dadu
- Shah Jahan Mosque, Thatta
- Chaukhandi Tombs, Karachi
- Archaeological Site of Mehrgarh
- Archaeological Site of Rehman Dheri
- Archaeological Site of Harappa
- Archaeological Site of Ranigat
- Shahbazgarhi Rock Edicts
- Mansehra Rock Edicts
- Baltit Fort
- Tombs of Bibi Jawindi, Baha'al-Halim and Ustead and the Tomb and Mosque of Jalaluddin Bukhari
- Tomb of Shah Rukn-e-Alam
- Port of Banbhore
- Derawar and the Desert Forts of Cholistan
- Hingol Cultural Landscape
- Karez System Cultural Landscape
- Nagarparkar Cultural Landscape
- Central Karakoram National Park
- Deosai National Park
- Ziarat Juniper Forest
- The Salt Range and Khewra Salt Mine
- Kalasha Valley Cultural Landscape
- Kot Diji Fort
- Naukot Fort
- Umerkot Fort
- Tomb of Sultan Muqarrab Khan
- Rewat Fort
- Mai Qamro Mosque
- Pharwala Fort
- Bazira-Barikot
- Archaeological Complex of Gor Khatri
- Sethi House
- Bhamala Buddhist Complex

== Palau ==
=== World Heritage Sites ===
- Rock Islands Southern Lagoon

=== Tentative list ===
- Ouballang ra Ngebedech (Ngebedech Terraces)
- Imeong Conservation Area
- Yapease Quarry Sites
- Tet el Bad Stone Coffin

== Papua New Guinea ==
=== World Heritage Sites ===
- Kuk Early Agricultural Site

=== Tentative list ===
- Kikori River Basin / Great Papuan Plateau
- Kokoda Track and Owen Stanley Ranges
- Trans-Fly Complex
- Milne Bay Seascape (Pacific Jewels of Marine Biodiversity)
- The Sublime Karsts of Papua New Guinea
- Upper Sepik River Basin
- Huon Terraces - Stairway to the Past

== Philippines ==
=== World Heritage Sites ===
- Baroque Churches of the Philippines
- Tubbataha Reefs Natural Park
- Rice Terraces of the Philippine Cordilleras
- Historic City of Vigan
- Puerto Princesa Subterranean River National Park
- Mount Hamiguitan Range Wildlife Sanctuary

=== Tentative list ===
- Batanes Protected Landscapes and Seascapes
- The Tabon Cave Complex and all of Lipuun
- Butuan Archeological Sites
- Baroque Churches of the Philippines (Extension)
- Chocolate Hills Natural Monument
- Mt. Malindang Range Natural Park
- Mt. Pulag National Park
- Apo Reef Natural Park
- El Nido-Taytay Managed Resource Protected Area
- Coron Island Natural Biotic Area
- Mt. Iglit-Baco National Park
- Northern Sierra Madre Natural Park and outlying areas inclusive of the buffer zone
- Mt. Mantalingajan Protected Landscape
- Turtle Islands Wildlife Sanctuary
- The Sugar Cultural Landscape of Negros and Panay Islands
- The Historic Towns and Landscape of Taal Volcano and its Caldera Lake
- Colonial Urban Plan and Fortifications of the Walled City of Manila
- Agusan Marsh Wildlife Sanctuary
- Kitanglad and Kalatungan Mountain Ranges: Sacred Sites of Bukidnon
- Corregidor Island and Historic Fortifications of Manila Bay
- Samar Island Natural Park
- Prehistoric Sites of the Cagayan Valley Basin
- Rice Terraces of the Philippine Cordilleras (Extension)
- Mount Hamiguitan Range Wildlife Sanctuary (Extension) - Pujada Bay
- Mayon Volcano Natural Park

== Samoa ==
=== World Heritage Sites ===
As of 2026, Samoa does not have any sites inscribed on the World Heritage List.

=== Tentative list ===
- Fagaloa Bay – Uafato Tiavea Conservation Zone
- Manono, Apolima and Nuulopa Cultural Landscape

== Singapore ==
=== World Heritage Sites ===
- Singapore Botanic Gardens

=== Tentative list ===
- The Padang Civic Ensemble

== Solomon Islands ==
=== World Heritage Sites ===
- East Rennell

=== Tentative list ===
- Marovo - Tetepare Complex
- Tropical Rainforest Heritage of Solomon Islands

== South Korea ==
=== World Heritage Sites ===
- Seokguram Grotto and Bulguksa Temple
- Haeinsa Temple Janggyeong Panjeon, the Depositories for the Tripitaka Koreana Woodblocks
- Jongmyo Shrine
- Changdeokgung Palace Complex
- Hwaseong Fortress
- Gochang, Hwasun and Ganghwa Dolmen Sites
- Gyeongju Historic Areas
- Jeju Volcanic Island and Lava Tubes
- Royal Tombs of the Joseon Dynasty
- Historic Villages of Korea: Hahoe and Yangdong
- Namhansanseong
- Baekje Historic Areas
- Sansa, Buddhist Mountain Monasteries in Korea
- Seowon, Korean Neo-Confucian Academies
- Getbol, Korean Tidal Flats
- Gaya Tumuli
- Petroglyphs along the Bangucheon Stream

=== Tentative list ===
- Kangjingun Kiln Sites
- Mt. Soraksan Nature Reserve
- Sites of fossilized dinosaurs throughout the Southern seacoast
- Salterns
- Ancient Mountain Fortresses in Central Korea
- Upo Wetland
- Naganeupseong, Town Fortress and Village
- Oeam Village
- Stone Buddhas and Pagodas at Hwasun Unjusa Temple
- Archaeological Remains at the Hoeamsa Temple Site in Yangju City
- Capital Fortifications of Hanyang: Hangyangdoseong Capital City Wall, Bukhansanseong Mountain Fortress and Tangchundaeseong Defense Wall
- Sites of the Busan Wartime Capital

== Sri Lanka ==
=== World Heritage Sites ===
- Sacred City of Anuradhapura
- Ancient City of Polonnaruwa
- Ancient City of Sigiriya
- Sacred City of Kandy
- Sinharaja Forest Reserve
- Old Town of Galle and its fortifications
- Rangiri Dambulla Cave Temple
- Central Highlands of Sri Lanka

=== Tentative list ===
- Seruwila Mangala Raja Maha Vihara
- Seruwila to Sri Pada (Sacred Foot Print Shrine), Ancient pilgrim route along the Mahaweli river in Sri Lanka
- Ancient Ariyakara Viharaya in the Rajagala Archaeological Reserve
- Buddhist Meditation Monasteries of Ancient Sri Lanka
- Sri Lanka's Tea Cultural Landscape
- Ritigala Strict Nature Reserve

== Tajikistan ==
=== World Heritage Sites ===
- Proto-urban site of Sarazm
- Tajik National Park (Mountains of the Pamirs)
- Silk Roads: Zarafshan-Karakum Corridor
- Tugay forests of the Tigrovaya Balka Nature Reserve
- Cultural Heritage Sites of Ancient Khuttal

=== Tentative list ===
- Mausoleum of Amir Khamza Khasti Podshoh
- The Site of Ancient Town of Takhti-Sangin
- The Site of Ancient Town of Baitudasht IV
- Mausoleum of "Khoja Mashkhad"
- Buddhistic cloister of Ajina-Tepa
- Mausoleum of "Hodja Nashron"
- The Site of Ancient Town of Pyanjekent
- Mausoleum of "Mukhammad Bashoro"
- The Site of Ancient Town of Shahristan (Kahkakha)
- Fann Mountains
- Zakaznik Kusavlisay
- State reserve Dashti Djum
- Zorkul State Reserve
- Silk Roads Sites in Tajikistan
- Silk Roads: Fergana-Syrdarya Corridor
- Ancient City of Karon
- The Ancient Historical and Natural Sites of Kuldara, Lohuti, Obi Mazor and Khonakho
- Petroglyphs of Langar, Darshair, Shakhta, Nayzatash and Bakhmaljilga

== Thailand ==
=== World Heritage Sites ===
- Historic Town of Sukhothai and Associated Historic Towns
- Historic City of Ayutthaya
- Thungyai–Huai Kha Khaeng Wildlife Sanctuaries
- Ban Chiang Archaeological Site
- Dong Phayayen–Khao Yai Forest Complex
- Kaeng Krachan Forest Complex
- The Ancient Town of Si Thep and its Associated Dvaravati Monuments
- Phu Phrabat, a testimony to the Sīma stone tradition of the Dvaravati period
- Wat Phra Mahathat Woramahawihan, Nakhon Si Thammarat

=== Tentative list ===
- Monuments, Sites and Cultural Landscape of Chiang Mai, Capital of Lanna
- Phra That Phanom, its related historic buildings and associated landscape
- Ensemble of Phanom Rung, Muang Tam and Plai Bat Sanctuaries
- The Andaman Sea Nature Reserves of Thailand
- Songkhla and its Associated Lagoon Settlements
- Phra Prang of Wat Arun Ratchawararam: The Masterpiece of Krung Rattanakosin

== Timor-Leste ==
Timor-Leste has no sites on the World Heritage List or its tentative list.

== Tonga ==
=== World Heritage Sites ===
As of 2026, Tonga does not have any sites inscribed on the World Heritage List.

=== Tentative list ===
- The Ancient Capitals of the Kingdom of Tonga (Haʻamonga ʻa Maui and Muʻa)
- Lapita Pottery Archaeological Sites (A National Serial Site for consideration as the Kingdom of Tonga’s contribution to a transnational serial site listing)

== Turkmenistan ==
=== World Heritage Sites ===
- State Historical and Cultural Park “Ancient Merv”
- Kunya-Urgench
- Parthian Fortresses of Nisa
- Silk Roads: Zarafshan-Karakum Corridor
- Cold Winter Deserts of Turan

=== Tentative list ===
- Dehistan / Mishrian
- Badhyz State Nature Reserve
- Syunt Hasardag State Nature Reserve
- Dinosaurs and Caves of Koytendag
- Repetek Biosphere State Reserve
- Amudarya State Nature Reserve
- Hazar State Nature Reserve
- Silk Roads Sites in Turkmenistan
- Karst, Canyons, and Caves of Kugitang

== Tuvalu ==
=== World Heritage Sites ===
As of 2026, Tuvalu does not have any sites inscribed on the World Heritage List.

=== Tentative list ===
- The Pacific atoll-island cultural landscape of Tuvalu.

== Uzbekistan ==
=== World Heritage Sites ===
- Itchan Kala (Khiva)
- Historic Centre of Bukhara
- Historic Centre of Shakhrisyabz
- Samarkand – Crossroads of Cultures
- Western Tien-Shan
- Silk Roads: Zarafshan-Karakum Corridor
- Cold Winter Deserts of Turan
- Tashkent Modernist Architecture. Modernity and Tradition in Central Asia

=== Tentative list ===
- Complex of Sheikh Mukhtar-Vali (mausoleum)
- Khanbandi (dam)
- Ak Astana-baba (mausoleum)
- Kanka
- Shahruhiya
- Abdulkhan Bandi Dam
- Arab-Ata Mausoleum
- Historic Centre of Qoqon
- Ahsiket
- Ancient Pap
- Andijon
- Siypantosh Rock Paintings
- Ancient Termiz
- Zarautsoy Rock Paintings
- Khazarasp
- Desert Castles of Ancient Khorezm
- Silk Road Sites in Uzbekistan
- Tashkent makhallas
- Silk Roads: Fergana-Syrdarya Corridor
- Zomin Mountains
- Hisor Mountains
- Shokhimardon Mountains
- Sarmishsay petroglyphs
- Boysun
- Kuhitang Mountains
- Nurota Mountains
- Karst, Canyons, and Caves of Kugitang
- Chilpik the Tower of Silence
- Ancient towns and fortresses of the Aral Sea region
- Koktepa: An Early Urbanization Centre of the Zarafshan Valley

== Vanuatu ==
=== World Heritage Sites ===
- Chief Roi Mata's Domain

=== Tentative list ===
- Yalo, Apialo and the sacred geography of Northwest Malakula
- The President Coolidge
- Vatthe Conservation Area
- Lake Letas
- The Nowon and Votwos of Ureparapara

== Vietnam ==
=== World Heritage Sites ===
- Complex of Huế Monuments
- Hạ Long Bay – Cát Bà Archipelago
- Hội An Ancient Town
- Mỹ Sơn Sanctuary
- Phong Nha–Kẻ Bàng National Park and Hin Nam No National Park
- Central Sector of Imperial Citadel of Thăng Long
- Citadel of the Hồ Dynasty
- Tràng An Scenic Landscape Complex
- Yên Tử – Vĩnh Nghiêm – Côn Sơn, Kiếp Bạc Complex of Monuments and Landscapes

=== Tentative list ===
- Area of Old Carved Stone in Sapa
- Hương Sơn Complex of Natural Beauty and Historical Monuments
- Cát Tiên National Park
- Con Moong Cave
- Ba Bể – Na Hang Natural Heritage Area
- Óc Eo–Ba Thê archaeological site
- Van Long-Kim Bang-Tam Chuc Sanctuary: Delacour’s Langur Bio-cultural Landscape
- Củ Chi tunnels
- The Complex of Co Loa Ancient Citadel
