= List of World Heritage Sites in Tajikistan =

Locations of UNESCO World Heritage Sites in Tajikistan. Red dots are cultural sites, the green dots are natural sites. Blue dots indicate the Silk Roads: Zarafshan-Karakum Corridor sites.

The United Nations Educational, Scientific and Cultural Organization (UNESCO) designates World Heritage Sites of outstanding universal value to cultural or natural heritage which have been nominated by countries signatories to the UNESCO World Heritage Convention, established in 1972. Cultural heritage consists of monuments (such as architectural works, monumental sculptures, or inscriptions), groups of buildings, and sites (including archaeological sites). Natural heritage consists of natural features (physical and biological formations), geological and physiographical formations (including habitats of threatened species of animals and plants), and natural sites which are important from the point of view of science, conservation, or natural beauty. As of 2025, Tajikistan has five sites on the list.

== World Heritage Sites ==
UNESCO lists sites under ten criteria; each entry must meet at least one of the criteria. Criteria i through vi are cultural, and vii through x are natural.

* Transnational site

World Heritage Sites
Site	Image	Location (region)	Year listed	UNESCO data	Description
Proto-urban site of Sarazm		Sughd Region	1141; ii, iii (cultural)	2010	Sarazm, which means "where the land begins", is an archaeological site bearing testimony to the development of human settlements in Central Asia, from the 4th millennium BCE to the end of the 3rd millennium BCE. The ruins demonstrate the early development of proto-urbanization in this region. This centre of settlement, one of the oldest in Central Asia, is situated between a mountainous region suitable for cattle rearing by nomadic pastoralists, and a large valley conducive to the development of agriculture and irrigation by the first settled populations in the region. Sarazm also demonstrates the existence of commercial and cultural exchanges and trade relations with peoples over an extensive geographical area, extending from the steppes of Central Asia and Turkmenistan, to the Iranian plateau, the Indus valley and as far as the Indian Ocean.
Tajik National Park (Mountains of the Pamirs)		Districts under Central Government Jurisdiction and Gorno-Badakhshan	1252; vii, viii (natural)	2013	Tajikistan National Park covers more than 2.5 million hectares in the east of the country, at the centre of the so-called "Pamir Knot", a meeting point of the highest mountain ranges on the Eurasian continent. It consists of high plateaux in the east and, to the west, rugged peaks, some of them over 7,000 meters high, and features extreme seasonal variations of temperature. The longest valley glacier outside the Polar region is located among the 1,085 glaciers inventoried in the site, which also numbers 170 rivers and more than 400 lakes. Rich flora species of both the south-western and central Asian floristic regions grow in the Park which shelters nationally rare and threatened birds and mammals (Marco Polo Argali sheep, Snow Leopards and Siberian Ibex and more). Subject to frequent strong earthquakes, the Park is sparsely inhabited, and virtually unaffected by agriculture and permanent human settlements. It offers a unique opportunity for the study of plate tectonics and subduction phenomena.
Silk Roads: Zarafshan-Karakum Corridor*		Districts under Central Government Jurisdiction and Sughd Region	1675; ii, iii, v (cultural)	2023	The Zarafshan-Karakum Corridor is a key section of the Silk Roads in Central Asia that connects other corridors from all directions. Located in rugged mountains, fertile river valleys, and uninhabitable desert, the 866-kilometre corridor runs from east to west along the Zarafshan River and further southwest following the ancient caravan roads crossing the Karakum Desert to the Merv Oasis. Channelling much of the east–west exchange along the Silk Roads from the 2nd century BCE to the 16th century CE, a large quantity of goods was traded along the corridor. People travelled, settled, conquered, or were defeated here, making it a melting pot of ethnicities, cultures, religions, sciences, and technologies. Ancient Panjakent is pictured.
Tugay forests of the Tigrovaya Balka Nature Reserve		Khatlon Region	1685; ix (natural)	2023	This property is located between the Vakhsh and Panj rivers in southwestern Tajikistan. The Reserve includes extensive riparian tugay ecosystems, the sandy Kashka-Kum desert, the Buritau peak, as well as the Hodja-Kaziyon mountains. The property is composed of a series of floodplain terraces covered by alluvial soils, comprising tugay riverine forests with very specific biodiversity in the valley. The tugay forests in the reserve represent the largest and most intact tugay forest of this type in Central Asia, and this is the only place in the world where the Asiatic poplar tugay ecosystem has been preserved in its original state over an area of this size.
Cultural Heritage Sites of Ancient Khuttal		Khatlon Region	1627; ii, iii (cultural)	2025	Ancient Khuttal was a medieval kingdom located between the Panj and Vakhsh Rivers and the Pamir piedmonts. The property includes ten sites and one monument reflecting its role from the 7th to 16th centuries in Silk Roads trade. Khuttal contributed valuable goods like salt, gold, silver, and horses, and served as a hub for cultural, religious, and technological exchanges. Its diverse archaeological remains—Buddhist temples, palaces, settlements, manufacturing centres, and caravanserais—illustrate its strategic importance and vibrant interactions with neighbouring empires.

== Tentative list ==
In addition to sites inscribed on the World Heritage List, member states can maintain a list of tentative sites that they may consider for nomination. Nominations for the World Heritage List are only accepted if the site was previously listed on the tentative list. As of 2025, Tajikistan has listed sixteen properties on its tentative list.

Tentative sites
Site	Image	Location (region)	Year listed	UNESCO criteria	Description
Mausoleum of "Amir Khamza Khasti Podshoh"		Sughd Region	1999	(cultural)	
The Site of Ancient Town of Takhti-Sangin		Khatlon Region	1999	(cultural)	
Zorkul State Reserve		Gorno-Badakhshan	1999	vii, x (natural)	
State reserve Dashti Djum		Khatlon Region	1999	vii, x (natural)	
Zakaznik Kusavlisay		Sughd Region	1999	vii, x (natural)	
Fann Mountains		Sughd Region	1999	vii, x (natural)	
The Site of Ancient Town of Shahristan (Kahkakha)		Sughd Region	1999	(cultural)	
Mausoleum of "Mukhammad Bashoro"		Sughd Region	1999	(cultural)	
The Site of Ancient Town of Pyanjekent		Sughd Region	1999	(cultural)	
Mausoleum of "Hodja Nashron"		Districts under Central Government Jurisdiction	1999	(cultural)	
Buddhistic cloister of Ajina-Tepa		Khatlon Region	1999	(cultural)	
Mausoleum of "Khoja Mashkhad"		Khatlon Region	1999	(cultural)	
The Site of Ancient Town of Baitudasht IV		Khatlon Region	1999	(cultural)	
Silk Roads Sites in Tajikistan		Districts under Central Government Jurisdiction, Gorno-Badakhshan, Khatlon Region, and Sughd Region	2013	iii, iv, v, vi (cultural)	
Silk Roads: Fergana-Syrdarya Corridor		Sughd Region	2023	ii, iii (cultural)	
Ancient City of Karon		Gorno-Badakhshan	2025	ii, iv, v (cultural)	

== See also ==
- Tourism in Tajikistan
- List of World Heritage Sites in Northern and Central Asia
- List of Intangible Cultural Heritage elements in Tajikistan
