= List of World Heritage Sites in Uzbekistan =

Locations of World Heritage Sites in Uzbekistan. Orange dots are the Cold winter deserts of Turan and purple dots are the sites of Western Tien-Shan. The Silk Road sites are not shown.

The United Nations Educational, Scientific and Cultural Organization (UNESCO) designates World Heritage Sites of outstanding universal value to cultural or natural heritage which have been nominated by signatories to the 1972 UNESCO World Heritage Convention. Cultural heritage consists of monuments (such as architectural works, monumental sculptures, or inscriptions), groups of buildings, and sites (including archaeological sites). Natural heritage consists of natural features (physical and biological formations), geological and physiographical formations (including habitats of threatened species of animals and plants), and natural sites which are important from the point of view of science, conservation, or natural beauty. Uzbekistan accepted the UNESCO World Heritage Convention on 13 January 1993. As of 2026, eight sites in Uzbekistan are included: six cultural sites and 2 natural sites. In addition to its inscribed sites, Uzbekistan also lists thirty-seven properties on its tentative list.

== World Heritage Sites ==
UNESCO lists sites under ten criteria; each entry must meet at least one of the criteria. Criteria i through vi are cultural, and vii through x are natural.

† In danger
* Transnational site

World Heritage Sites
Site	Image	Location (region)	Year listed	UNESCO data	Description
Itchan Kala (Khiva)		Xorazm Region	1990	543; iii, iv, v (cultural)	Itchan Kala is the inner town (protected by brick walls some 10 m high) of the old Khiva oasis, which was the last resting-place of caravans before crossing the desert to Iran. Although few very old monuments still remain, it is a coherent and well-preserved example of the Muslim architecture of Central Asia. There are several outstanding structures such as the Djuma Mosque, the mausoleums and the madrasas and the two magnificent palaces built at the beginning of the 19th century by Alla-Kulli-Khan.
Historic Centre of Bukhara		Bukhara Region	1993	602bis; ii, iv, vi	Bukhara, which is situated on the Silk Route, is more than 2,000 years old. It is the most complete example of a medieval city in Central Asia, with an urban fabric that has remained largely intact. Monuments of particular interest include the famous tomb of Ismail Samani, a masterpiece of 10th-century Muslim architecture, and a large number of 17th-century madrasas.
Historic Centre of Shakhrisyabz^{†}		Qashqadaryo Region	2000	885; iii, iv (cultural)	The historic centre of Shakhrisyabz contains a collection of exceptional monuments and ancient quarters which bear witness to the city's secular development, and particularly to the period of its apogee, under the rule of Amir Temur and the Temurids, in the 15th-16th century.
Samarkand – Crossroads of Cultures		Samarqand Region	2001	603rev; i, ii, iv (cultural)	The historic town of Samarkand is a crossroad and melting pot of the world's cultures. Founded in the 7th century B.C. as ancient Afrasiab, Samarkand had its most significant development in the Timurid period from the 14th to the 15th centuries. The major monuments include the Registan Mosque and madrasas, Bibi-Khanum Mosque, the Shakhi-Zinda compound and the Gur-Emir ensemble, as well as Ulugh-Beg's Observatory.
Western Tien-Shan*		Tashkent Region	2016	1490; x (natural)	The transnational property is located in the Tien-Shan mountain system, one of the largest mountain ranges in the world. Western Tien-Shan ranges in altitude from 700 to 4,503 m. It features diverse landscapes, which are home to exceptionally rich biodiversity. It is of global importance as a centre of origin for a number of cultivated fruit crops and is home to a great diversity of forest types and unique plant community associations.
Silk Roads: Zarafshan-Karakum Corridor*		Samarqand Region, Navoiy Region, Bukhara Region	2023	1675; ii, iii, iv (cultural)	The Zarafshan-Karakum Corridor is a key section of the Silk Roads in Central Asia that connects other corridors from all directions. Located in rugged mountains, fertile river valleys, and uninhabitable desert, the 866-kilometre corridor runs from east to west along the Zarafshan River and further southwest following the ancient caravan roads crossing the Karakum Desert to the Merv Oasis. Channelling much of the east–west exchange along the Silk Roads from the 2nd century BCE to the 16th century CE, a large quantity of goods was traded along the corridor. People travelled, settled, conquered, or were defeated here, making it a melting pot of ethnicities, cultures, religions, sciences, and technologies.
Cold Winter Deserts of Turan*		Karakalpakstan	2023	1693; ix, x (natural)	This transnational property comprises fourteen component parts found across arid areas of Central Asia's temperate zone between the Caspian Sea and the Turanian high mountains. The area is subject to extreme climatic conditions with very cold winters and hot summers, and boasts an exceptionally diverse flora and fauna that has adapted to the harsh conditions. The property also represents a considerable diversity of desert ecosystems, spanning a distance of more than 1,500 kilometres from East to West. Each of the component parts complements the others in terms of biodiversity, desert types, and ongoing ecological processes.
Tashkent Modernist Architecture. Modernity and Tradition in Central Asia	History Museum, a white modernist building	Tashkent, Tashkent Region	2026	1766; iv (cultural)	

== Tentative list ==
In addition to sites inscribed on the World Heritage List, member states can maintain a list of tentative sites that they may consider for nomination. Nominations for the World Heritage List are only accepted if the site was previously listed on the tentative list. As of 2026, Uzbekistan has listed 37 properties on its tentative list.

Tentative sites
Site	Image	Location (region)	Year listed	UNESCO criteria	Description
Complex of Sheikh Mukhtar-Vali (mausoleum)	–	Khorazm Region	1996	i, ii, iii (cultural)	The mausoleum was built in the 16th century above the grave of Sheikh Mukhtar-Vali, who died in 1287. The mausoleum complex comprises multiple cupolas, annexes, storage rooms, two mosques, and the burial vault . These features are incorporated into a complex design, with a long east-west footprint.
Khanbandi (dam)	–	Jizzakh Region	1996	i, ii, iii (cultural)	
Ak Astana-baba (mausoleum)	–	Surxondaryo Region	1996	i, ii, iii (cultural)	
Kanka	A stone wall and citadel in a green field	Tashkent Region	2008	ii, iii, iv, vi (cultural)	
Shahruhiya	–	Tashkent Region	2008	ii, iii, iv, vi (cultural)	
Abdulkhan Bandi Dam	–	Jizzakh Region	2008	iv (cultural)	
Arab-Ata Mausoleum	A square building with elevated facade and significant engraving	Samarkand Region	2008	ii (cultural)	
Historic Centre of Qoqon	The front of elevated palace, with a large central arch and walls. It is covered in blue and yellow designs	Fergana Region	2008	ii (cultural)	
Ahsiket	A sunken archeological site with several structures	Namangan Region	2008	i, ii, iii, iv (cultural)	
Ancient Pap	–	Namangan Region	2008	i, iii, iv (cultural)	
Andijon	A large blue and cream-coloured mosque	Andijan Region	2008	iii, iv, v (cultural)	
Siypantosh Rock Paintings	–	Qashqadaryo Region	2008	ii, iii (cultural)	
Ancient Termiz	A large stupa in a field	Surxondaryo Region	2008	i, ii, iii, iv, v, vi, ix (mixed)	
Zarautsoy Rock Paintings	Several red mammals painted on a rock	Surxondaryo Region	2008	i, ii, iii (cultural)	This nomination comprises Zaraut-kamar grotto, located in the Kuhitang Mountains, and its mesolithic to middle ages rock paintings. The approximately 40 ancient figures are drawn with red-brown and gray-brown mineral paint, and depict animals, humans, and hybrid bird-human figures, many engaged in hunting. Red Arabic text was painted during the late middle ages, some of it partially over the ancient figures.
Poykent	An elevated archeological site, with several uncovered features	Bukhara Region	2008	ii, iii, iv, vi (cultural)	
Varakhsha	An elevated stone mound with smooth features	Bukhara Region	2008	iv, v (cultural)	
Chashma-Ayub Mausoleum	A square, stone building with several domes	Bukhara Region	2008	ii (cultural)	
Chor-Bakr	A stone building with a central square, flanked by two arches	Bukhara Region	2008	iv (cultural)	
Bahoutdin Architectural Complex	A front gate with a large central arch, flanked by walls with smaller arches. It is covered in blue, white, and gold designs	Bukhara Region	2008	iv (cultural)	
Rabati Malik Caravanserai	A large arch, with several designs built into its surface	Navoiy Region	2008	i, ii, iii, iv, v (cultural)	The caravanserai was constructed along the Silk Road by order of Shams al-Mulk Nasr in the 11th century. It is preserved in its surrounding adobe walls and central portal, one of the largest and oldest of its kind in Central Asia. The portal is decorated with adobe designs, terracotta carved into eight-pointed stars, and ganch carvings of vegetables.
Mir-Sayid Bakhrom Mausoleum	A stone building, with an entry arch and overhang	Navoiy Region	2008	iii (cultural)	
Khazarasp	–	Khorazm Region	2008	i, ii, iii, iv, v (cultural)	
Desert Castles of Ancient Khorezm	A short fortress in a field	Karakalpakstan	2008	i, ii, iii, iv, v, vi (cultural)	
Minaret in Vobkent	A minaret in the center of a city square	Bukhara Region	2008	i, ii, iii (cultural)	
Silk Road Sites in Uzbekistan	A walled brick complex with several arches, buildings, and a domed tower	Andijan, Bukhara, Fergana, Khorazm, Namangan, Navoiy, Surxondaryo, Tashkent Regions	2010	ii, iii, iv, v, vi (cultural)	
Tashkent makhallas	An aerial view of a city, containing buildings of varying sizes	Tashkent	2021	ii, iii, v (cultural)	
Silk Roads: Fergana-Syrdarya Corridor*	A circular stone building in a hilly steppe	Andijan, Fergana, Namangan, Tashkent Regions, Tashkent	2023	ii, iii, v (cultural)	
Nurota Mountains	A series of sandy mountains	Navoiy Region	2024	vii, viii (natural)	
Kuhitang Mountains	Two mountains in the foreground and background, dotted with trees	Surxondaryo Region	2024	vii, viii, x (natural)	
Boysun	A blue lake and hilly landscape dotted with trees	Surxondaryo Region	2024	iv, v, vii, x (mixed)	
Sarmishsay petroglyphs	Several animal and human figures carved onto the side of a stone	Navoiy Region	2024	vi, ix (cultural)	
Shokhimardon Mountains	–	Fergana Region	2024	vii, ix, x (natural)	
Hisor Mountains	A grey mountainous landscape	Qashqadaryo Region	2024	vii, vii, x (natural)	
Zomin Mountains	A large mountain range viewed from a field	Jizzakh Region	2024	vii, ix, x (natural)	
Karst, Canyons, and Caves of Kugitang*	A tree in a mountainous landscape	Surxondaryo Region	2025	vii, viii, x (natural)	This transnational nomination shared with Turkmenistan covers the southwestern part of the Pamir-Alay Range, including mountains, cold winter deserts and semi-deserts. The local caves have exceptional crystal formations, and the area, with its complex karst system, is home to both typical Central Asian species and those endemic to the region. Kugitang also has a high density of fossil formations and dinosaur footprints. From Uzbekistan, the Surkhan State Nature Reserve is nominated.
Ancient towns and fortresses of the Aral Sea region	A sunken archeological dig with several walls	Karakalpakstan	2025	ii, iii, iv, v (cultural)	Before the Aral Sea dried up, the area around it was one of the largest oases in Central Asia, and contains numerous archaeological sites and fortresses, including Akchakhan-Kala (excavations pictured).
Chilpik the Tower of Silence	A circular mud structure on a hill	Karakalpakstan	2025	iii, iv (cultural)	The tower of silence, a Zoroastrian structure to excarnate corpses, was built in the 1st century CE and used between the 1st–4th and 9th–11th centuries. It is a large semicircle constructed from adobe brick and positioned at the top of a hill, with a ramp leading to the top. The top is constructed with mudbricks, with channels to divert rainwater. Its scale is emphasized by its isolated location. The tower has become a defining symbol of Karakalpakstan, being included in its national emblem and significantly contributing to regional tourism.

== See also ==
- List of Intangible Cultural Heritage elements in Uzbekistan
