= Natural areas in Tajikistan =

Preserves parks and reserves in Tajikistan

Natural areas in Tajikistan include:

- Pamir National Park
- Ramit State Nature Reserve
- Tigrovaya Balka Nature Reserve
- Zorkul Nature Reserve

== Ramsar Convention (wetland) sites ==
- Karakul (Tajikistan) (Lake)
- Kayrakkum Reservoir
- Panj River

== See also ==
- Category:Protected areas of Tajikistan
