= List of World Heritage Sites in Central Asia =

The UNESCO (United Nations Educational, Scientific and Cultural Organization) has designated 19 World Heritage Sites in six countries (also called "state parties") of Central and North Asia: Kazakhstan, Kyrgyzstan, Tajikistan, Turkmenistan, Uzbekistan and the Asian part of Russia. The European part of Russia is included in Eastern Europe.

Russia is home to the most inscribed sites with 8 sites, two of which are transborder properties shared with Mongolia in Eastern Asia. The first site from the region was the Itchan Kala in Uzbekistan inscribed in 1990. Each year, UNESCO's World Heritage Committee may inscribe new sites on the list, or delist sites that no longer meet the criteria. Selection is based on ten criteria: six for cultural heritage (i–vi) and four for natural heritage (vii–x). Some sites, designated "mixed sites," represent both cultural and natural heritage. In Northern and Central Asia, there are 11 cultural, 8 natural, and no mixed sites. All of the Russian sites (7) are natural and with the exception of Sayarka, all of the sites in Central Asia are cultural.

The World Heritage Committee may also specify that a site is endangered, citing "conditions which threaten the very characteristics for which a property was inscribed on the World Heritage List." None of the sites in this region has ever been listed as endangered, but possible danger listing has been considered by UNESCO in a number of cases.

== Legend ==
Site; named after the World Heritage Committee's official designation
Location; at city, regional, or provincial level and geocoordinates
Criteria; as defined by the World Heritage Committee
Area; in hectares and acres. If available, the size of the buffer zone has been noted as well. A value of zero implies that no data has been published by UNESCO
Year; during which the site was inscribed to the World Heritage List
Description; brief information about the site, including reasons for qualifying as an endangered site, if applicable

== World Heritage Sites ==
* Trans-border site

Site	Image	Location	Criteria	Area ha (acre)	Year	Refs
Central Sikhote-Alin		Primorsky Krai, Russia; 45°20′N 136°10′E	Natural: (x)	1,553,928 (3,839,840); buffer zone 65,250 (161,200)	2001	
Cultural Heritage Sites of Ancient Khuttal		Khatlon Region, Tajikistan; 37°44′38.4″N 69°17′52.8″E	Cultural: (ii)(iii)	152 (380); buffer zone 409 (1,010)	2025	
Golden Mountains of Altai		Altai Republic, Russia; 50°28′N 86°0′E	Natural: (x)	1,611,457 (3,982,000)	1998	
Historic Centre of Bukhara		Bukhara Region, Uzbekistan; 39°46′29″N 64°25′43″E	Cultural: (ii), (iv), (vi)	—	1993	
Historic Centre of Shakhrisyabz		Qashqadaryo Region, Uzbekistan; 39°3′0″N 66°50′0″E	Cultural: (iii), (iv)	240 (590); buffer zone 82 (200)	2000	
Itchan Kala		Khiva, Xorazm Region, Uzbekistan; 41°22′42″N 60°21′50″E	Cultural: (iii), (iv), (v)	26 (64)	1990	
Kunya-Urgench		Daşoguz Region, Turkmenistan; 42°10′59″N 59°5′6″E	Cultural: (ii), (iii)	—	2005	
Lake Baikal		Irkutsk Oblast and Republic of Buryatia, Russia; 53°10′25″N 107°39′45″E	Natural: (vii), (viii), (ix), (x)	8,800,000 (22,000,000)	1996	
Landscapes of Dauria		Zabaykalsky Krai, Russia*; Dornod Province, Mongolia*; 49°55′N 115°25′E	Natural: (ix), (x)	912,624 (2,255,140); buffer zone 307,317 (759,400)	2017	
Lena Pillars Nature Park		Sakha Republic, Russia; 60°40′0″N 127°0′0″E	Natural: (viii)	1,272,150 (3,143,600)	2012	
Mausoleum of Khoja Ahmed Yasawi		Turkistan, Turkistan Region, Kazakhstan; 43°17′35″N 68°16′28″E	Cultural: (i), (iii), (iv)	0.55 (1.4); buffer zone 88 (220)	2003	
Natural System of Wrangel Island Reserve		Chukotka Autonomous Okrug, Russia; 71°11′20″N 179°42′55″E	Natural: (ix), (x)	916,300 (2,264,000); buffer zone 3,745,300 (9,255,000)	2004	
Parthian Fortresses of Nisa		Bagyr settlement, Ruhabat District, Ahal Region, Turkmenistan; 37°59′59″N 58°11′55″E	Cultural: (ii), (iii)	78 (190); buffer zone 400 (990)	2007	
Petroglyphs within the Archaeological Landscape of Tamgaly		Almaty Region, Kazakhstan; 43°48′12″N 75°32′6″E	Cultural: (iii)	900 (2,200); buffer zone 2,900 (7,200)	2004	
Proto-urban site of Sarazm		Panjakent, Tajikistan; 39°30′28″N 67°27′37″E	Cultural: (ii), (iii)	16 (40); buffer zone 142 (350)	2010	
Putorana Plateau		Krasnoyarsk Krai, Russia; 69°2′49″N 94°9′29″E	Natural: (vii), (ix)	1,887,251 (4,663,500); buffer zone 1,773,300 (4,382,000)	2010	
Samarkand – Crossroads of Cultures		Samarqand Region, Uzbekistan; 39°40′7″N 67°0′0″E	Cultural: (i), (ii), (iv)	965 (2,380)	2001	
Saryarka — Steppe and Lakes of Northern Kazakhstan		Akmola and Kostanay Regions, Kazakhstan; 50°26′N 69°11′E	Natural: (ix), (x)	450,344 (1,112,820); buffer zone 211,148 (521,760)	2008	
Silk Roads: the Routes Network of Chang'an-Tianshan Corridor		22 sites in China*: Luoyang, Lingbao and Xin'an of Henan Province; Xi'an, Bin County and Chenggu of Shaanxi Province; Tianshui, Yongjing, Dunhuang and Anxi of Gansu Province; Turpan, Jimsar and Kuqa of Xinjiang Uyghur Autonomous Region. 8 sites in Kazakhstan*: Almaty Region and Jambyl Region. 3 sites in Kyrgyzstan*: Chüy Region	Cultural: (ii)(iii)(iv)(vi)	42,668.16 (105,435.3); buffer zone 189,963.13 (469,409.1)	2014	
State Historical and Cultural Park “Ancient Merv”		Mary Region, Turkmenistan; 37°42′3″N 62°10′39″E	Cultural: (ii), (iii)	353 (870); buffer zone 883 (2,180)	1999	
Sulaiman-Too Sacred Mountain		Osh, Kyrgyzstan; 40°31′52″N 72°46′58″E	Cultural: (iii), (vi)	112 (280); buffer zone 4,788 (11,830)	2009	
Tajik National Park (Mountains of the Pamirs)		Tajikistan; 38°45′54″N 72°18′19″E	Natural: (vii), (viii)	2,611,674 (6,453,590)	2013	
Tugay forests of the Tigrovaya Balka Nature Reserve		Khatlon Region, Tajikistan; 37°16′N 68°28′E	Natural: (iv)	49,786 (123,020); buffer zone 17,672 (43,670)	2023	
Uvs Nuur Basin		Uvs, Zavkhan and Khövsgöl Provinces Mongolia*; Mongun-Tayginsky, Ovyursky, Tes-Khemsky and Erzinsky Districts, Tuva Republic, Russia*; 50°16′30″N 92°43′1″E	Natural: (ix), (x)	898,064 (2,219,160); buffer zone 170,790 (422,000)	2003	
Volcanoes of Kamchatka		Kamchatka Krai, Russia; 56°20′N 158°30′E	Natural: (vii), (viii), (ix), (x)	3,830,200 (9,465,000)	1996 (Note: Extended in 2001 to include Kluchevskoy Nature Park.)	

=== Tentative List ===
Site	Image	Location	Criteria	Year	Refs
Cultural Landscape of Ulytau		Ulytau Region, Kazakhstan	Cultural: (v)	2021	
Northern Tyan Shan (Ili-Alatau National Park)		Almaty Region, Kazakhstan	Natural: (x)	2002	
State National Natural Park "Altyn Emel"		Almaty Region, Kazakhstan	Natural: (vii), (viii), (ix)	2002	
Saimaly-Tash Petroglypghs		Jalal-Abad Region, Kyrgyzstan	Cultural: (iii), (iv), (vi)	2001	
Khulbuk -Capital of Ancient Khuttal		Hulbuk, Vose' District, Khatlon Region, Tajikistan	Cultural: (ii), (iii), (iv)	2021	
Fann Mountains		Sughd Region, Tajikistan	Mixed: (vii), (x)	2006	
Mausoleum of Amir Khamza Khashti Podshoh		Chorkuh, Isfara District, Sughd Region, Tajikistan	Cultural	1999	
Mausoleum of Khoja Mashkhad		Khatlon Region, Tajikistan	Cultural	1999	
Ancient Town of Takht-i-Sangin		Khatlon Region, Tajikistan	Cultural	1999	
Bahoutdin Architectural Complex		Bukhara, Bukhara Region, Uzbekistan	Cultural: (iv)	2008	
Historic Centre of Qoqon		Kokand, Fergana Region, Uzbekistan	Cultural: (ii)	2008	
Andijan		Andijan, Andijan Region, Uzbekistan	Cultural: (iii), (iv), (v)	2008	
Ancient Termiz		Termez, Surxondaryo Region, Uzbekistan	Mixed: (i), (ii), (iii), (iv), (v), (vi), (ix)	2008	
Historic Centre of Irkutsk		Irkutsk, Irkutsk Oblast, Russia	Cultural	1998	
Historic Centre of Yeniseysk		Yeniseysk, Krasnoyarsk Krai, Russia	Cultural: (ii), (iii), (iv)	2000	
Valley of the Kingsof Tuva (Arzhan)		Tuva Republic, Russia	Cultural: (i), (iii), (iv)	2021	
Kytalyk National Park		Sakha Republic, Russia	Natural: (ix), (x)	2021	
Krasnoyarsk Stolby		Krasnoyarsk Krai, Russia	Natural: (vii), (viii), (ix), (x)	2007	
Magadansky Nature Reserve		Magadan Oblast, Russia	Natural: (vii), (viii), (ix), (x)	2007	
