= Streptomyces arboris =

Scientific classification
- Domain: Bacteria
- Kingdom: Bacillati
- Phylum: Actinomycetota
- Class: Actinomycetia
- Order: Streptomycetales
- Family: Streptomycetaceae
- Genus: Streptomyces
- Species: S. arboris

Binomial name
- Streptomyces arboris Liu et al. 2020

Type strain
- TRM 68085

Species of bacterium

Streptomyces arboris is a bacterium species from the genus Streptomyces which has been isolated from soil of Populus euphratica wetland.

== See also ==
- List of Streptomyces species
