= Streptomyces indoligenes =

Scientific classification
- Domain: Bacteria
- Kingdom: Bacillati
- Phylum: Actinomycetota
- Class: Actinomycetia
- Order: Streptomycetales
- Family: Streptomycetaceae
- Genus: Streptomyces
- Species: S. indoligenes

Binomial name
- Streptomyces indoligenes Luo et al. 2016

Type strain
- CCTCC AA 2015010, KCTC 39611, TRM 43006

Species of bacterium

Streptomyces indoligenes is a Gram-positive bacterium species from the genus of Streptomyces which has been isolated from rhizosphere soil from the tree Populus euphratica in Xinjiang in China.

== See also ==
- List of Streptomyces species
