= List of Intangible Cultural Heritage elements in Tajikistan =

Location of Tajikistan

The United Nations Educational, Scientific and Cultural Organization (UNESCO) defines intangible cultural heritage elements as non-physical traditions and practices performed by a people. As part of a country's cultural heritage, they include celebrations, festivals, performances, oral traditions, music, and the making of handicrafts. The term intangible cultural heritage is formally established by the Convention for the Safeguarding of the Intangible Cultural Heritage, which was drafted in 2003 and took effect in 2006. The inscription of new heritage elements on UNESCO's Intangible Cultural Heritage Lists for protection and safeguarding is determined by the Intergovernmental Committee for the Safeguarding of Intangible Cultural Heritage, an organization established by the Convention. Tajikistan ratified the Convention on 17 August 2010.

National lists are required by the Convention for the further nomination of elements to the UNESCO lists.

== Intangible Cultural Heritage of Humanity ==
UNESCO's Intangible Cultural Heritage of Humanity consists of three lists: the Representative List of the Intangible Cultural Heritage of Humanity, the List of Intangible Cultural Heritage in Need of Urgent Safeguarding, and the Register of Good Safeguarding Practices. Tajikistan only has elements inscribed on the Representative List.

† Transnational element

=== Representative List ===
This list aims to represent the intangible cultural heritage of Tajikistan worldwide and bring awareness to its significance.

Intangible Cultural Heritage elements recognized by UNESCO
Name	Media	Year	No.	Description
Shashmaqom music † (Note: Shared with Uzbekistan)	People sitting in rows of chairs, listening to Shashmaqom being played	2008	00089	
Oshi Palav, a traditional meal and its social and cultural contexts in Tajikistan		2016	01191	
Chakan, embroidery art in the Republic of Tajikistan		2018	01397	
Falak		2021	01725	
Telling tradition of Nasreddin Hodja/ Molla Nesreddin/ Molla Ependi/ Apendi/ Afendi Kozhanasyr Anecdotes † (Note: Shared with Azerbaijan, Kazakhstan, Kyrgyzstan, Turkey, Turkmenistan, and Uzbekistan.)	A 17th-century miniature of Nasruddin	2022	01705	
Sericulture and traditional production of silk for weaving † (Note: Shared with Afghanistan, Azerbaijan, Iran, Turkey, Turkmenistan, and Uzbekistan.)		2022	01890	
Art of illumination: Təzhib/Tazhib/Zarhalkori/Tezhip/Naqqoshlik † (Note: Shared with Azerbaijan, Iran, Turkey, and Uzbekistan.)		2023	01981	
Sadeh/Sada celebration † (Note: Shared with Iran.)		2023	01713	
Traditional knowledge and skills of production of the atlas and adras fabrics		2023	01706	
Ceremony of Mehregan † (Note: Shared with Iran.)		2024	02144	
Art of crafting and playing rubab/rabab † (Note: Shared with Afghanistan, Iran, and Uzbekistan.)		2024	02143	
Nawrouz, Novruz, Nowrouz, Nowrouz, Nawrouz, Nauryz, Nooruz, Nowruz, Navruz, Nevruz, Nowruz, Navruz † (Note: Shared with Afghanistan, Azerbaijan, India, Iran, Iraq, Kazakhstan, Kyrgyzstan, Mongolia, Pakistan, Turkey, Turkmenistan, and Uzbekistan.)	Girl with torch on mountainside	2024	02097	
Culture of Sumanak/Sumalak cooking		2025	02336	

== See also ==
- List of World Heritage Sites in Tajikistan
- Culture of Tajikistan
- Tourism in Tajikistan
