= Chinese Liquor Making Sites =

Various locations of liquor making in the People's Republic of China served to facilitate some local cultural forms into flourishing, such as literature, calligraphy and music. The collection of liquor making locations is being considered to be put on the World Heritage list of sites who have "outstanding universal value" to the world.

== Liquor making sites ==
- 1. Site of LiuLing Workshop, Xushui County, Hebei.
- 2. Site of Lidu Workshop, Jinxian County, Jiangxi.
- 3. Site of Shuijingjie Workshop, Chengdu, Sichuan.
- 4. Site of Cellar Cluster for Luzhou Laojiao, Luzhou, Sichuan.
- 5. Site of Tianyi Workshop for Jiannanchun Liquor, Mianzhu, Sichuan.

== World Heritage Status ==
This collection of liquor making sites was added to the UNESCO World Heritage Tentative List on March 28, 2008 in the Cultural category.
