= Sites of fossilized dinosaurs across the southern South Korean coast =

Proposed UNESCO World Heritage site

- Hangul: 남해안 일대 공룡화석지
- Hanja: 南海岸一帶恐龍化石地
- RR: Namhaean ildae gongnyong hwaseokji
- MR: Namhaean iltae kongnyong hwasŏkchi

The sites of fossilized dinosaurs across the southern South Korean coast is a tentative UNESCO World Heritage site registered by the South Korean government since 2002. Although the evidence is rare, fossils reveal that there were dinosaurs in South Korea. The ancient remains of dinosaurs are located within a beautiful display of nature that includes petrified wood, the tracks of extinct dinosaurs and other animals, the exposure of geographic rock layers, and particular river drifts. This dinosaur park is well protected by the local governments and by the Marine National Park and is an invaluable resource for understanding the ecosystem and nesting behaviors of dinosaurs of the Mesozoic era.

The largest sites of fossilized dinosaur eggs and footprints of dinosaurs from the Cretaceous period of the Mesozoic era in the world are located in various sites along the southern seacoast of South Korea. Fossilized eggs are widely distributed and are in well preserved conditions. Additionally, the footprints of two webbed-feet/birds are also some of the oldest of its kind to be discovered.

The Haenam-gun site is most famous for the footprints of giant dinosaurs discovered there. This site, the first in Asia, also preserves the footprints of webbed-feet birds that once walked along the shores. This site is South Korean Natural Monument No. 394.

Dinosaur nests, measuring at 1.5 meters in diameter, and fossilized eggs are perfectly preserved at the Boseong-gun site. This site is South Korean Natural Monument No. 418.

The city of Yeosu and the islands of Sado, Choodo, Nangdo, Jeokgeumdo, and Mokgeumdo are famous for the many fossils from the Cretaceous period. This area is particularly famous for a trail of footprints that measures 84 meters in length. This site is designated as Monument of Jeollanam-do No. 199.

The Goseong-gun site is famous for the number and variety of fossils excavated and includes 4,000 dinosaur footprints and paleontologists have identified over 420 different walking trails there as well. This site is South Korean Natural Monument No. 411.

The site was selected as the country's candidate for World Heritage listing for 2009, under the name Korean Cretaceous Dinosaur Coast.

== Geographic location ==
- Uhang-ri, Hwangsan-myeon, Haenam-gun, Jeollanam-do: (3 34°35'20"N, 126°26'21"E)
- Bibong-ri, Deungnyang-myeon, Boseong-gun, Jeollanam-do: (34°45' N, 127°10' E)
- Sado-ri, Hwajeong-myeon, Yeosu-si, Jeollanam-do: (34°34'-37' N, 127°31'-34' E)
- Seoyu-ri, Buk-myeon, Hwasun-gun, Jeollanam-do: (35°09'51" N, 127°36'31" E)
- Deongmyeong-ri, Hai-myeon, Goseong-gun, Gyeongsangnam-do: (34°54' N, 128°08' E)
