= Oeam =

Tentative World Heritage Site in South Korea

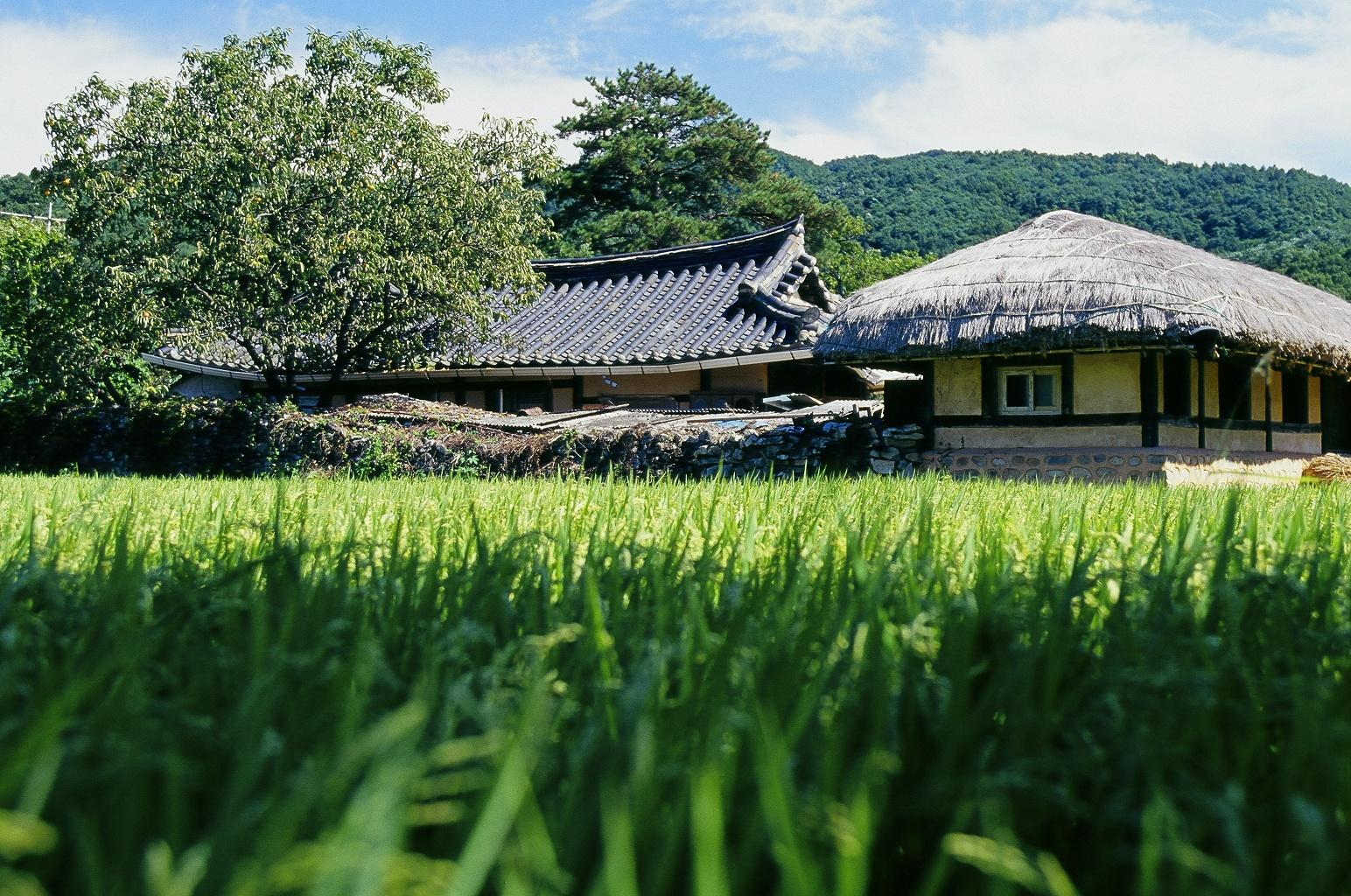

- Location within South Korea
- Location: Asan, South Chungcheong, South Korea
- Nearest city: Asan
- Coordinates: 36.7311°N 127.0136°E
- Area: 19 ha (47 acres)
- Designation: 236th Important Folklore Cultural Heritage
- Designated: January 7, 2000
- Governing body: Cultural Heritage Administration

Oeam (Korean: 외암; Hanja: 外巖; MR: Oeam) is a traditional village dated from the Joseon period in South Chungcheong, South Korea, near Asan. The village preserves Joseon period architecture and customs, and was included in the UNESCO world heritage tentative list in 2011. In South Korea, it was designated an Important Folklore Cultural Heritage in 2000.

== History ==
The village was founded around the early 16th century by the members of the Kang and Mok clans. In the 16th century, during the reign of King Myeongjong, a high ranking government official named Yi Jeong (이정) moved here and thus the Yean Yi clan (예안 이씨) started to settle down in the area. Yi Jeong's sixth generation descendant, Yi Gan's (이간) pen name was Oeam, thus the village was named after him.

== Characteristics ==
In 2011, the village had a population of 192, living in 69 households, out of which 38 households were involved in agricultural activities. The village preserved its Joseon layout, the buildings reflect the societal structure of the era. Almost half of the buildings have thatched roofs and the occupants re-thatch the roofs every year, using a traditional method. Houses are surrounded by stone walls.

The village lies at the bottom of the Seolhwasan mountain to the Northeast, and the Bongsusan mountain is to the Southeast of the village. The settlement is of an oval shape, and lies on the imaginary line connecting the two mountains. Houses face South-Southwest. It has one main road, where several side roads join in. Arable land stretches west of the village, and a stream flows between the land and the village. This is a typical Joseon layout for villages. Oeam is special because there are several waterways in the village, connecting the gardens of the houses to the stream. The gardens are characteristic of Korean gardens of the era.

The villagers preserve rituals and customs from the Joseon era that are under national heritage protection, and also prepare food characteristic of the region, such as bukkumi.

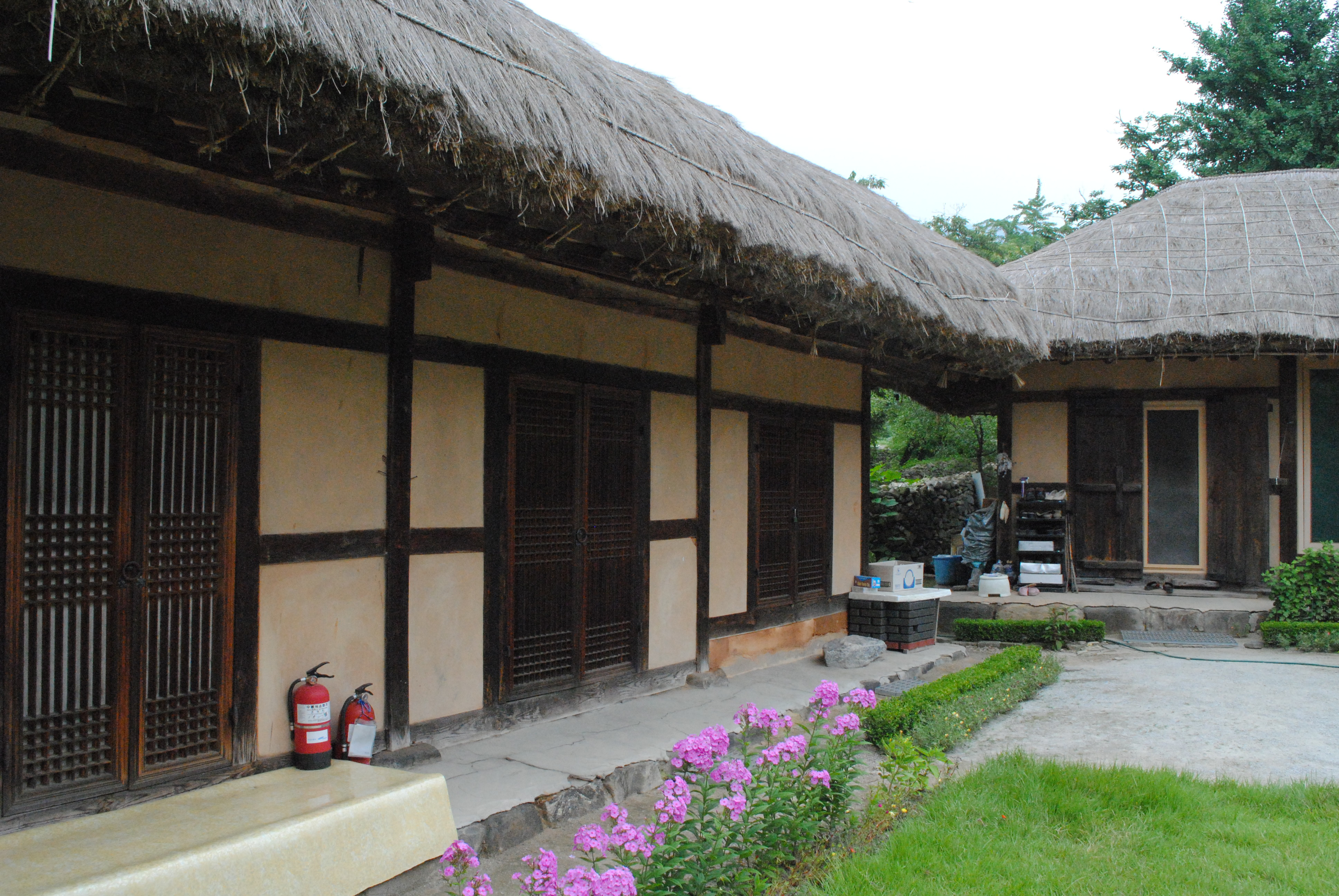
Local Hanok

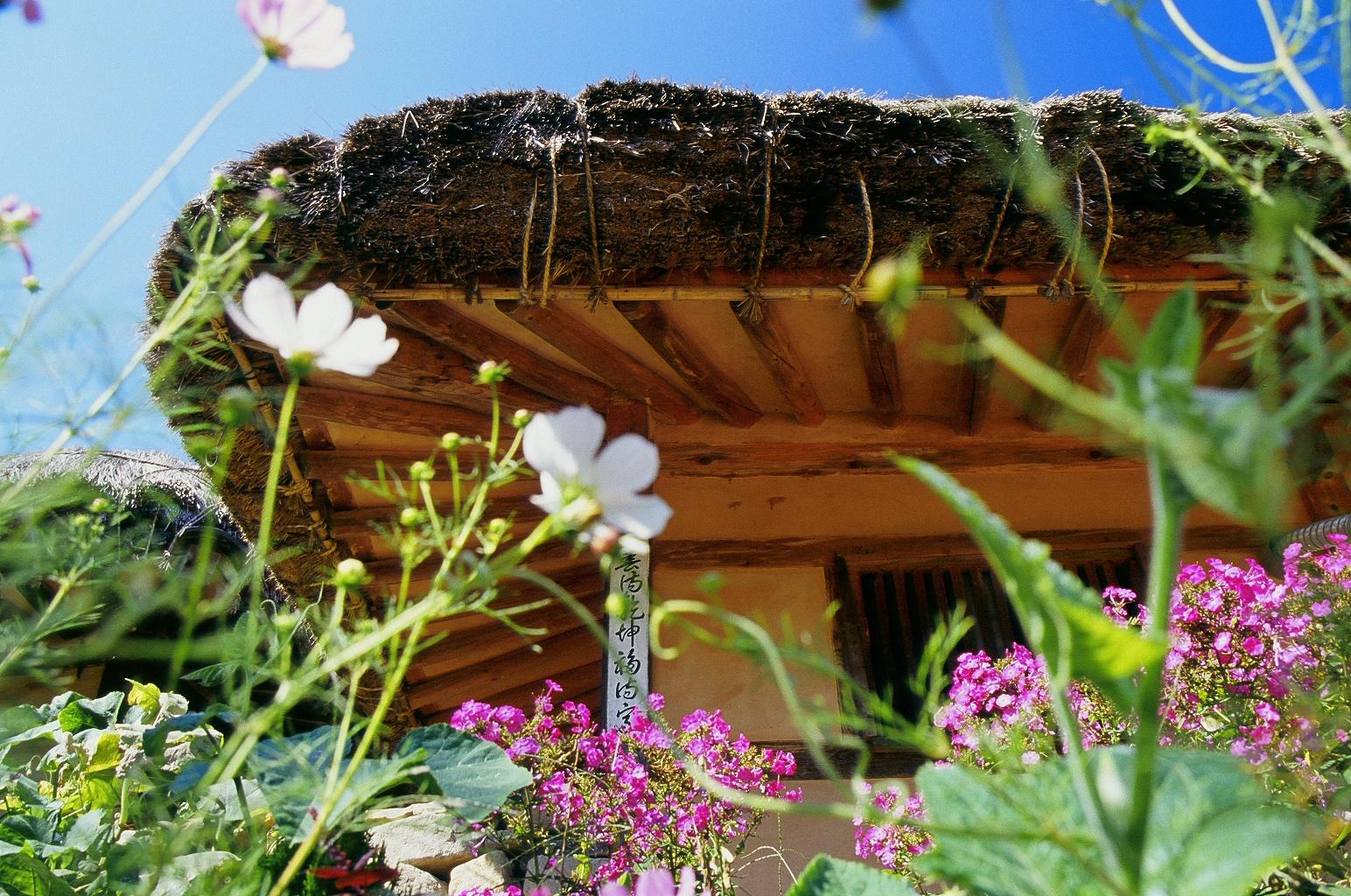
Garden under the eaves

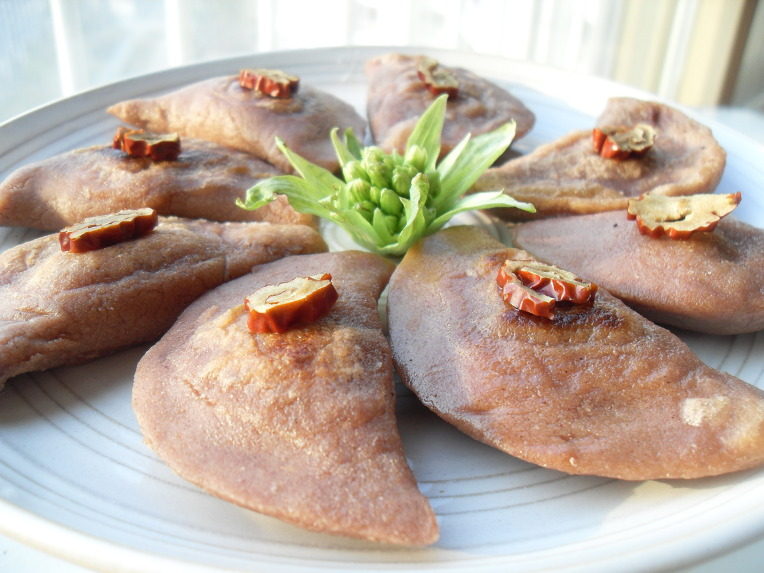
bukkumi

== In popular culture ==
The village served as a shooting location or backdrop to several films and television series, including Taegukgi (2004), Chi-hwa-seon (2002) and Im Kkeokjeong (1996).
