= Vân Long Wetland Nature Reserve =

Nature reserve in Vietnam

Coordinates: 20.372°N 105.875°E

Designations

Ramsar Wetland
- Official name: Vân Long Wetland Nature Reserve
- Designated: 10 February 2017
- Reference no.: 2360

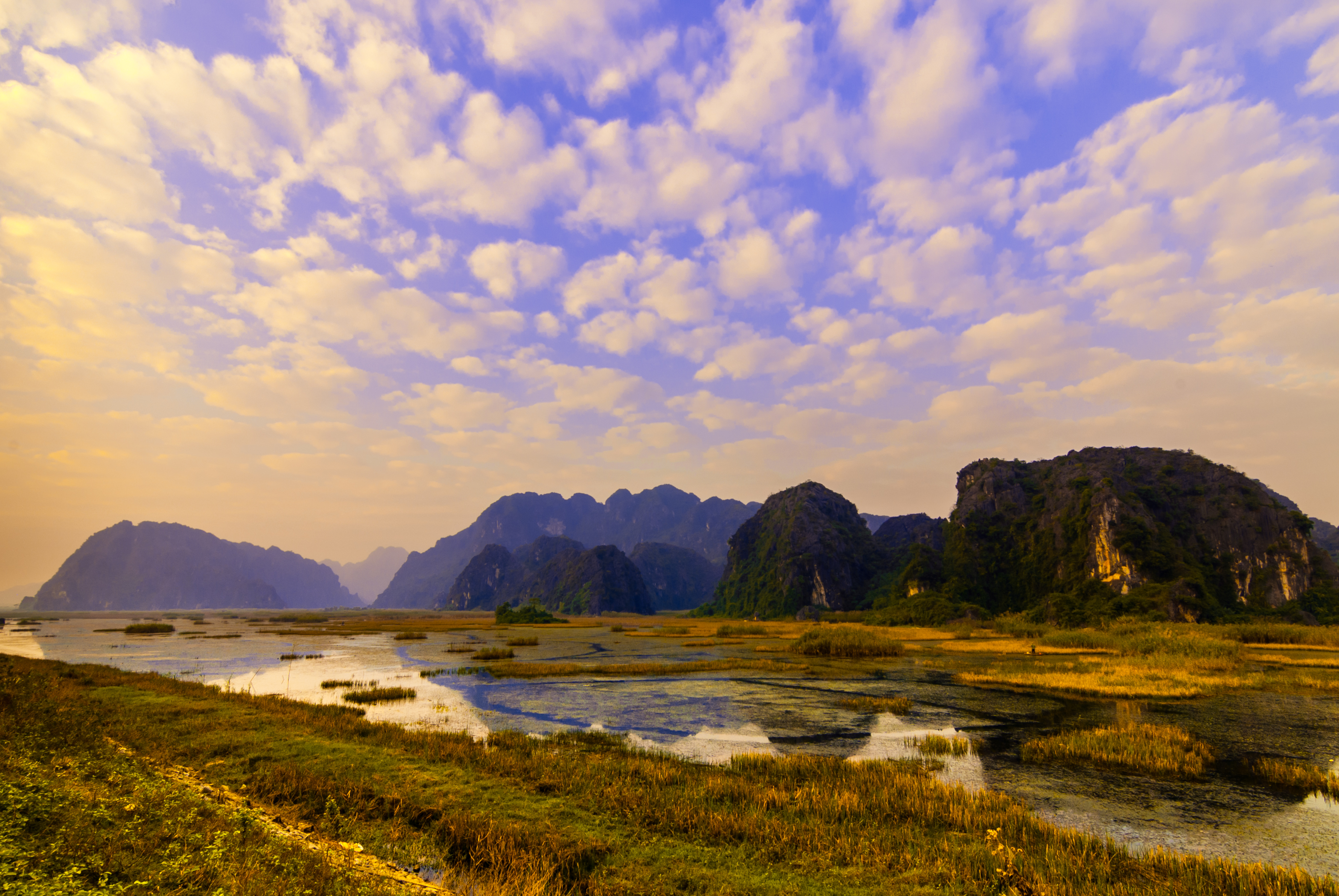
Vân Long landscsape

Vân Long Wetland Nature Reserve is a nature reserve in 3 communes Gia Vân, Gia Viễn, Gia Hưng, along the Northeastern border of Ninh Binh province, Vietnam. The site is one of the few intact lowland inland wetlands remaining in the Red River Delta. Limestone karst is surrounded by the freshwater lake, marshes and swamps. Together with subterranean hydrological systems they form a wetland complex, which is very rare in the Mainland Southeast Asia. Vân Long Wetland Nature Reserve is a habitat for the critically endangered Delacour's langur and is the only place where the species can be observed in the wild.
