= Ancient Pap =

Archaeological site in Uzbekistan

Coordinates: 40°50′N 71°02′E

Ancient Pap (also known as Balandtepa) was an ancient city on the right bank of the Syr Darya River in what is now the Namangan Region of Uzbekistan. It was a stop on the Silk Road, the famous trade route connecting China and Europe, and existed between the 1st and 8th centuries AD. The archaeological site was added to the UNESCO World Heritage Tentative List on 18 January 2008 in the cultural category.

The ruins of the city cover an area of over 9 hectares (22 acres). The site includes an inner city (shahristan) and citadel named Balandtepa, the destroyed outer city (rabad) and the Munchaktepe (or Munchoqtepa) necropolis.

Clothing and silk fragments of tabby weave were found during excavations from 1978 to 1994. The silk fragments were dated to the 5th century at the latest, and it was determined that most had been imported from China, though others came from outside China.

The Munchaktepe necropolis was discovered by accident in the 1980s, about 30 metres (98 ft) from the city ruins on a plateau. It consists of an underground complex of crypts, as well as pit-graves and L-type graves, with reed wicker coffins. The women had usually been buried with silk cloth and jewelry, the men with weapons. In 2024, more graves were discovered: five small ones containing one or two bodies dating to around 750 AD, and a large one with at least 24 corpses from around 400 AD.

The foundations of a house, about 8 square metres (86 sq ft), were found south of the tombs.
