= Abdulkhan Bandi Dam =

Dam in Uzbekistan

Coordinates: 40°30′N 66°21′E

Abdulkhan Bandi (Uzbek: Abdullaxon bandi / Абдуллахон банди) is a historic dam located near the village Eski Oqchob, 65 km east of the city Nurota in Uzbekistan. It impounds the river Beklarsoy and was built in the 1580s by Abdullah Khan II, ruler of Bukhara. Abdullakhan Bandi was first studied in 1957 and 1967 by archaeologist Yahya Ghulomov. When the river was blocked, the water level in front of the dam rose by 15 meters, the length of the reservoir reached 1250-1500 meters, and the width reached 75-125 meters. The dam is an important milestone for Central Asian hydroengineering, and has been added to the UNESCO World Heritage Tentative List on January 18, 2008, in the Cultural category.
