= Khanbandi =

Xonbandi
- Location within Uzbekistan
- Location: Forish District, Uzbekistan
- Coordinates: 40°30′33″N 67°16′25″E
- Purpose: Irrigation
- Status: Decommissioned
- Opening date: 10th-13th century

Dam and spillways
- Type of dam: Gravity dam
- Impounds: Ilonchisoy
- Height (thalweg): 15.25 m (50.0 ft)
- Length: 51.75 m (169.8 ft)
- Width (base): 8.2 m (27 ft)

Reservoir
- Total capacity: 1,5 million m³
- Maximum length: 1,500 m (4,900 ft)
- Maximum width: 200 m (660 ft)

UNESCO World Heritage Site
- Official name: Khanbandi (dam)
- Type: Cultural
- Criteria: i, ii, iii
- Designated: 1996

The Khanbandi dam (Uzbek: Xonbandi / Хонбанди) is a historic dam and reservoir in the Forish District, Jizzakh Region, Uzbekistan. It dates from the 10th century and impounds the rivers Osmonsoy and Ilonchisoy, that flow from the Nuratau Mountains, for irrigation purposes. The dam was added to the UNESCO World Heritage Tentative List on June 1, 1996, in the cultural category.
