= Baitudasht IV =

The ancient town of Baitudasht IV was located in the Pyange Region of Tajikistan.

== World Heritage Status ==
This site was added to the UNESCO World Heritage Tentative List on November 9, 1999 in the Cultural category.
