= Mausoleum of Hodja Nashron =

The Hodja Nashron Mausoleum is located in the Region of Republican Subordination, of western Tajikistan.

== World Heritage Status ==
This site was added to the UNESCO World Heritage Tentative List on September 11, 1999 in the Cultural category.

The site is being considered to be put on the World Heritage list of sites who have "outstanding universal value" to the world.
