= Dashti-Jum Nature Reserve =

Nature reserve in Tajikistan

Coordinates: 37°37′43″N 70°04′50″E

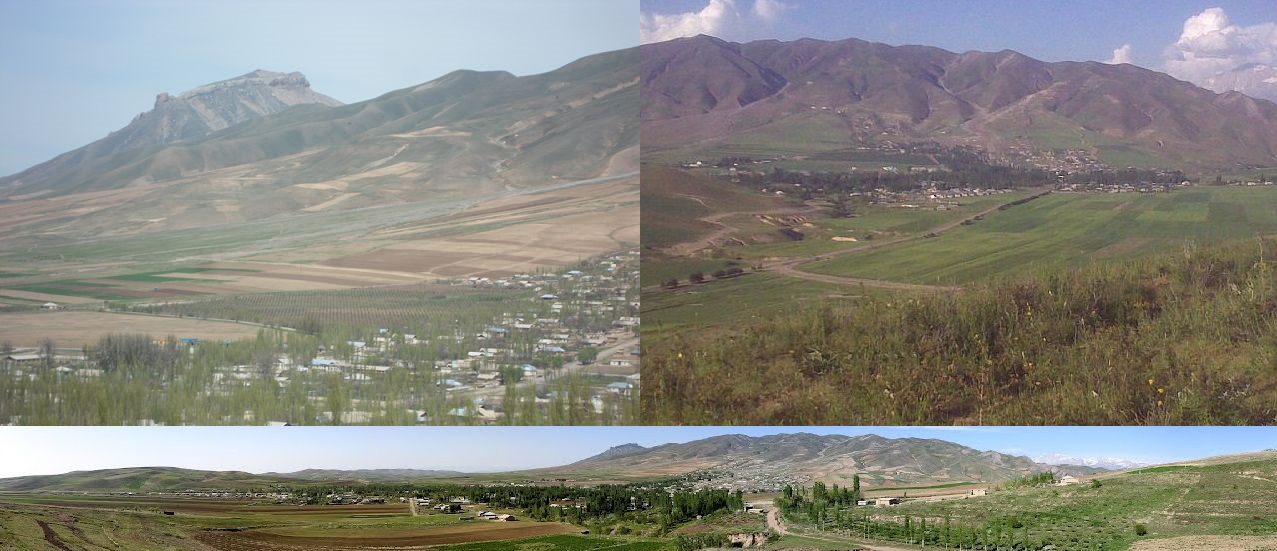
Nature from Dashti-Jum

Dashti-Jum (Tajik: Даштиҷум), also spelt Dashtidjum or Dashti Djum, is a 380 km^{2} nature reserve in eastern Khatlon Region in southwest Tajikistan. It is on the tentative list of World Heritage Sites, and has also been identified by BirdLife International as an Important Bird Area (IBA).

== Description ==
The reserve lies 80 km south-east of the city of Kulob, at an altitude of 1,300–2,500 m above sea level, in the southern part of the Hazrati Shoh mountain range. It extends southwards to the river Panj which forms the border with Afghanistan. It contains three small mountain rivers and their valleys, which have a diverse vegetation of woody thickets and herbage. The floodplain of the Panj attracts large numbers of waterbirds.

== Birds ==
The site qualifies as an IBA because it supports significant numbers of the populations of various bird species, either as residents, or as breeding or passage migrants. These include Himalayan snowcocks, common mergansers, saker falcons, Pallas's fish-eagles, cinereous vultures, ibisbills, pale-backed pigeons, yellow-billed choughs, Hume's larks, sulphur-bellied warblers, wallcreepers, white-winged redstarts, alpine accentors, rufous-streaked accentors, brown accentors, water pipits, crimson-winged finches and red-mantled rosefinches.
