= Ak Astana-Baba =

Heritage site in Uzbekistan

Coordinates: 38.3011°N 68.0190°E

Ak Astana-Baba (Uzbek: Oqostona bobo maqbarasi / Оқостона бобо мақбараси) is a 10th-11th century mausoleum that is located in the Sariosiyo District, Surxondaryo Region of Uzbekistan. The mausoleum was submitted to the UNESCO World Heritage Tentative List on June 1, 1996, in the Cultural category.
