= Zarautsoy Rock Paintings =

Archaeological site in Uzbekistan

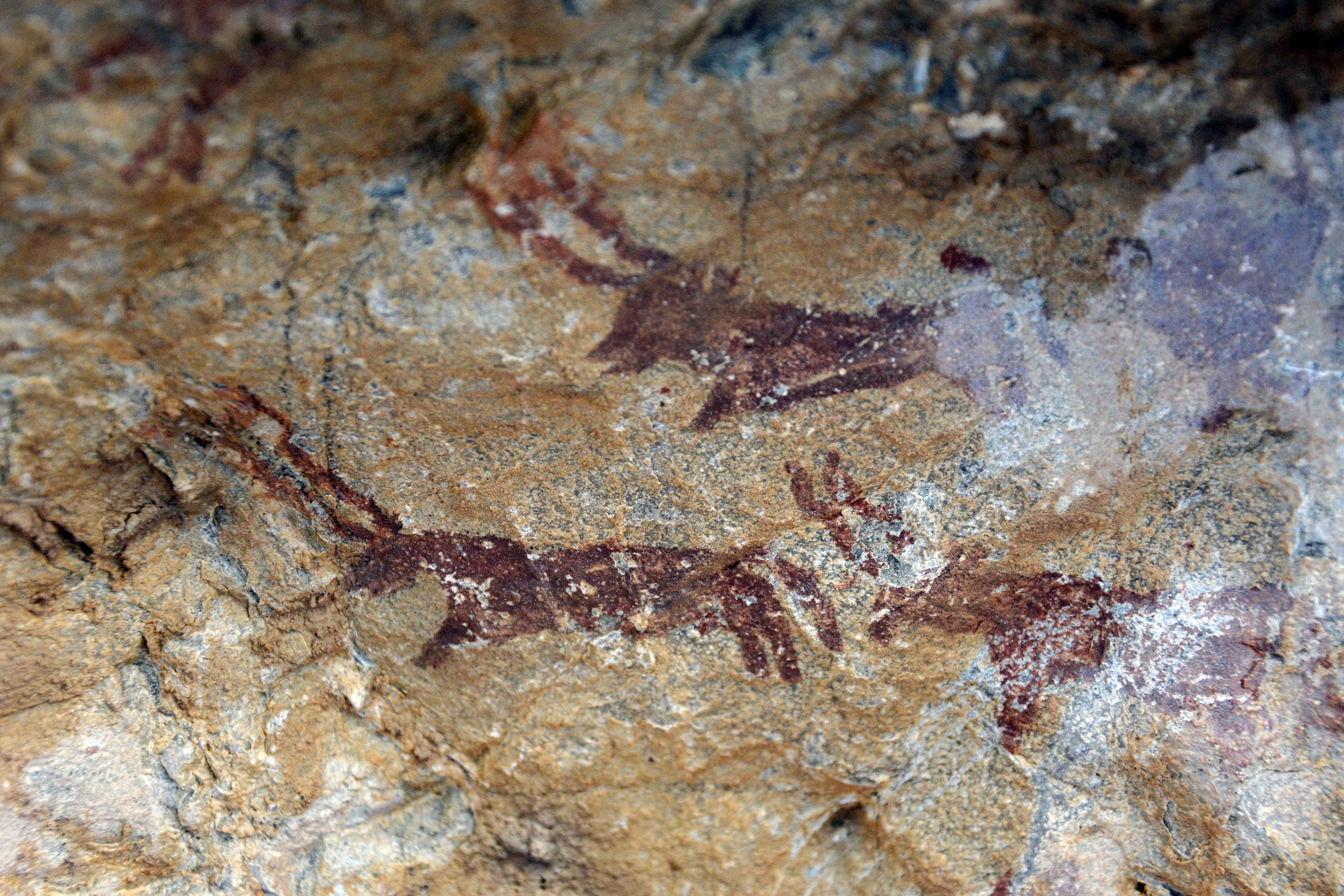

The Zarautsoy Rock Paintings (Uzbek: Zarautsoy rasmlari) are a gallery of rock art contains the oldest petroglyphs in Central Asia. The images describe primitive man's everyday life, and bull and wild goat hunting. The site is located in the Surxondaryo Region of Uzbekistan.

== Zaraut stream ==
The continuation of the Hisor River valley consists of the Kugitangtau and Gissar Mountains, which have numerous springs that give rise to several streams. One of these streams, known locally as "Rez," originates from a spring near the village of Qiziloqmaso in the Zaraut region. It flows down to the Qorabogʻ, Maydon, and Loyliq villages, eventually joining the Sherabot River.

Between the Big and Small Qorchiq areas in the Zaraut region, there is a wide basin considered to be the source of a small mountain river. Along the banks of this river, with steep elevations on both sides, you can find willow trees, various bushes, and long stretches of rocky terrain.

== Zaraut village ==
Zaraut has been one of the ancient mining and craftsmanship centers. There were two galleries in "Koʻpkaritaxti," two in Koʻksoy, one in Choʻchqabuloq, and one in Lalmi Etaga, totaling six mines (their remnants are still preserved). These mines consisted of one floor of Zaraut coal, one floor of raw shale rock, with a fire pit, chimney, and a furnace for smelting iron. According to Zaraut residents, in ancient times, charcoal and iron were exported to foreign countries via the Qiya road through the Katta Qoʻrchiq area. During the war years, the "Red Labor" collective farm workers used this same road to transport limestone slabs from the high mountain to the smelting furnaces. Zaraut's Qorabuloq, Koʻkbet, Oynabuloq, Sassiqbuloq, Shakaraklik mines contained various colored stones such as red, yellow, blue, white, turquoise, and others. In addition to these precious stones, Zaraut had deposits of valuable natural resources such as gold, cobalt, sapphire, aluminum, uranium, and twelve other precious minerals that have been part of its unique historical heritage. The coal from Koʻksoy mines has been utilized by the local population for centuries.

== Discovery of Zarautsoi paintings ==
The petroglyphs of Zarautsoy in Surkhandarya region, one of the earliest human settlements in the history of civilization, are known as a significant and famous artistic and historical heritage, occupying a portion of the arid Earth's surface for thousands of years. Scholars and archaeologists from the ancient Ittifoq (Alliance) have been exploring and documenting these rock images as valuable remnants of the Paleolithic era, comparable to Paleolithic relics in places such as France and Spain. Scholars and archaeologists in the Ittifoq have been actively conducting research in this area for a long time. It was only in 1959 that the Paleolithic paintings were discovered at Zarautsoy, entering the scientific world in 1939 after the rise of the art of Fan, and were found in the Kapova Cave in the Ural Mountains.

In 1940, an expedition led by G. V. Parfyonov was organized for the initial study of the Zarautsoy rock paintings, in cooperation with the Uzbekistan Art History Museum, the Surkhandarya district, and the Panjikent district in Tajikistan. This expedition revealed the Zarautsoy Red Rock paintings and explored several new painted sites. During the archaeological examination of the northern part of Zarautsoy, a flat stone was found that served as a primitive man's sleeping place, indicating a settled lifestyle. The traces of an early Paleolithic man, known as Duldul Ota, were identified during the cleanup process. These findings included stone tools, and they confirm the Paleolithic era's initial stages. All of these discoveries were eventually transferred to the Uzbekistan Art Museum at that time.

== World Heritage Status ==
This site was added to the UNESCO World Heritage Tentative List on 18 January 2008, in the Cultural category.
