= Mausoleum of Amir Khamza Khasti Podshoh =

Coordinates: 40.122692°N 70.612939°E

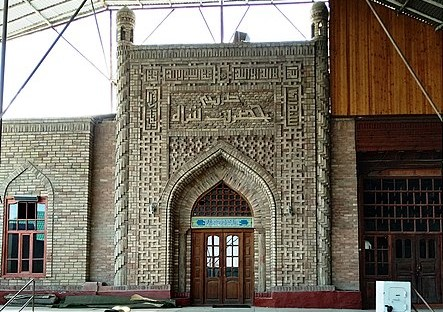

The Mausoleum of Amir Khamza Khasti Podshoh (Tajik: Мақбараи Ҳазрати Шоҳ, romanized: Maqbarai Hazrati Shoh) is located in the Sughd province of northern Tajikistan.

== Site Description ==
Built on the grave of a saint, the mausoleum is a unique testament to Islamic Central Asian architecture. The Middle Ages period structure includes intricately carved ceilings, Koranic inscriptions, and mud-brick construction.

== World Heritage Status ==
This site was added to the UNESCO World Heritage Tentative List on November 9, 1999, in the Cultural category.
