= Zorkul Nature Reserve =

Natural reserve in Tadjikistan

Coordinates: 37°25′35″N 73°46′20″E

Map of eastern Tajikistan and the Pamir Ranges, showing the Zorkul Nature Reserve outlined in red at lower right

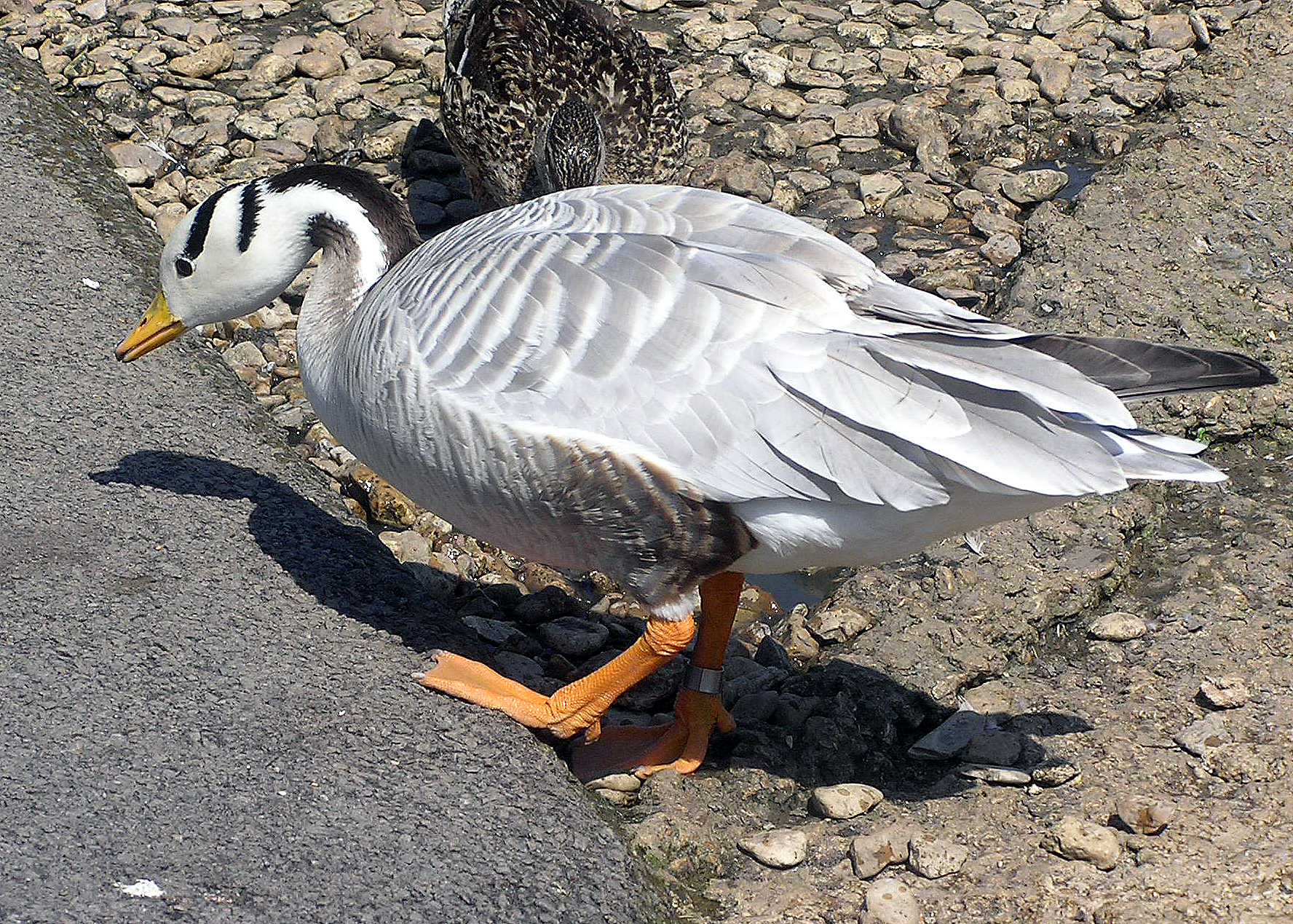
Bar-headed geese nest on islands in Lake Zorkul

Zorkul Nature Reserve is a 1,610 km^{2} (620 sq mi) nature reserve in the south-eastern section of the Gorno-Badakhshan autonomous region of Tajikistan, adjoining the border with the Wakhan National Park of Afghanistan in the Wakhan District of Badakhshan Province. The area was made a zakaznik in 1972 for the conservation of bar-headed geese and upgraded to a full nature reserve in 2000. It has also been identified by BirdLife International as an Important Bird Area (IBA).

== Description ==
The reserve occupies a wide valley 320 km (200 mi) east of the provincial capital of Khorugh, lying between the southern Alichur and Vahan ridges of the eastern Pamir Mountainss at 4,000–5,460 m (13,120–17,910 ft) above sea level. The landscape consists mainly of gentle slopes of sparsely vegetated alpine steppe. The core of the reserve is the 3,900 ha (9,600 acres) of Zorkul lake at an altitude of 4,125 m (13,533 ft). The maximum depth of the lake is 6 m (20 ft). Its surface is covered by vegetation. Bar-headed geese and other waterfowl breed on islands in the lake. Although land use in the reserve is prohibited, its surrounds are used as pasture.

== Fauna ==
As well as for bar-headed geese, with up to 125 breeding pairs using the site, the reserve was classified as an IBA because it supports significant numbers of the populations of several other bird species, either as residents, or as overwintering, breeding or passage migrants. These include Tibetan snowcocks, Himalayan snowcocks, ruddy shelducks, saker falcons, Himalayan vultures, lesser sand plovers, brown-headed gulls, yellow-billed choughs, Hume's larks, white-winged redstarts, white-winged snowfinches, rufous-streaked accentors, brown accentors, black-headed mountain finches, Caucasian great rosefinches and red-fronted rosefinches.

Mammals found in the area include long-tailed marmots, juniper voles, silver mountain voles, tolai hares, Royle's pikas, Marco Polo sheep. Siberian ibex, snow leopards, Eurasian lynx, Pallas's cats, grey wolves, red foxes, Turkmenian weasels, stoats and brown bears.

The two fish species found in the lake are the false osman and the Sattar snowtrout. No amphibians or reptiles have been recorded.

== See also ==
- Geography of Tajikistan
- Geography of Afghanistan
