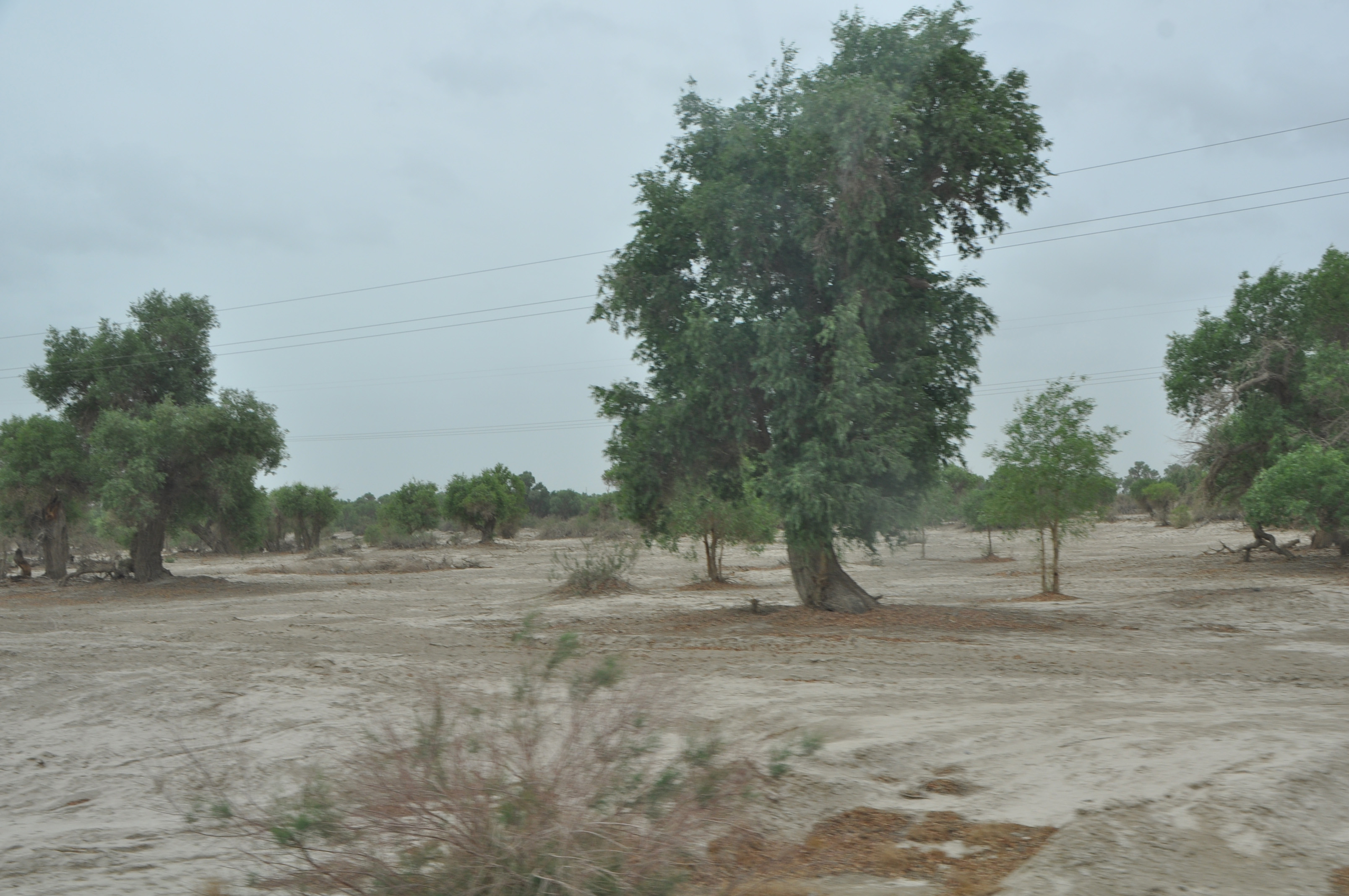

Conservation status
- Least Concern (IUCN 3.1)

Scientific classification
- Kingdom: Plantae
- Clade: Tracheophytes
- Clade: Angiosperms
- Clade: Eudicots
- Clade: Rosids
- Order: Malpighiales
- Family: Salicaceae
- Genus: Populus
- Species: P. euphratica

Binomial name
- Populus euphratica Oliv.

Synonyms
- Balsamiflua euphratica (Olivier) Kimura; Balsamiflua illicitana (Dode) Kimura; Populus ariana Dode; Populus diversifolia Schrenk; Populus illicitana Dode; Populus litwinowiana Dode; Populus transcaucasica Jarm. ex Grossh.; Turanga ariana Kimura; Turanga diversifolia Kimura; Turanga euphratica (Olivier) Kimura; Turanga litwinowiana (Dode) Kimura

= Populus euphratica =

Species of tree

Populus euphratica, commonly known as the Euphrates poplar, desert poplar, diversiform-leaved poplar, or poplar diversifolia, is a species of poplar tree in the willow family.

== Description ==
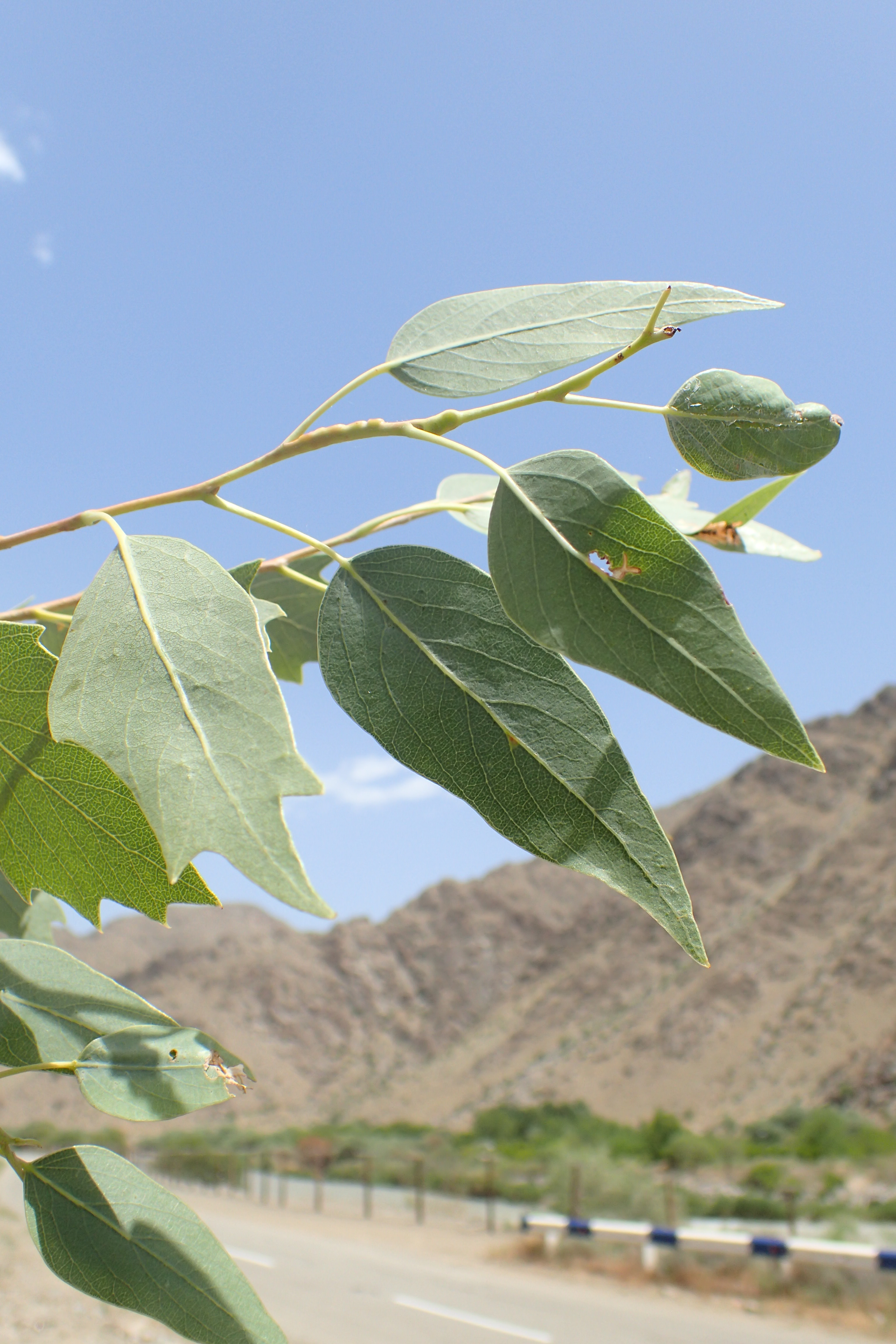
Leaf detail

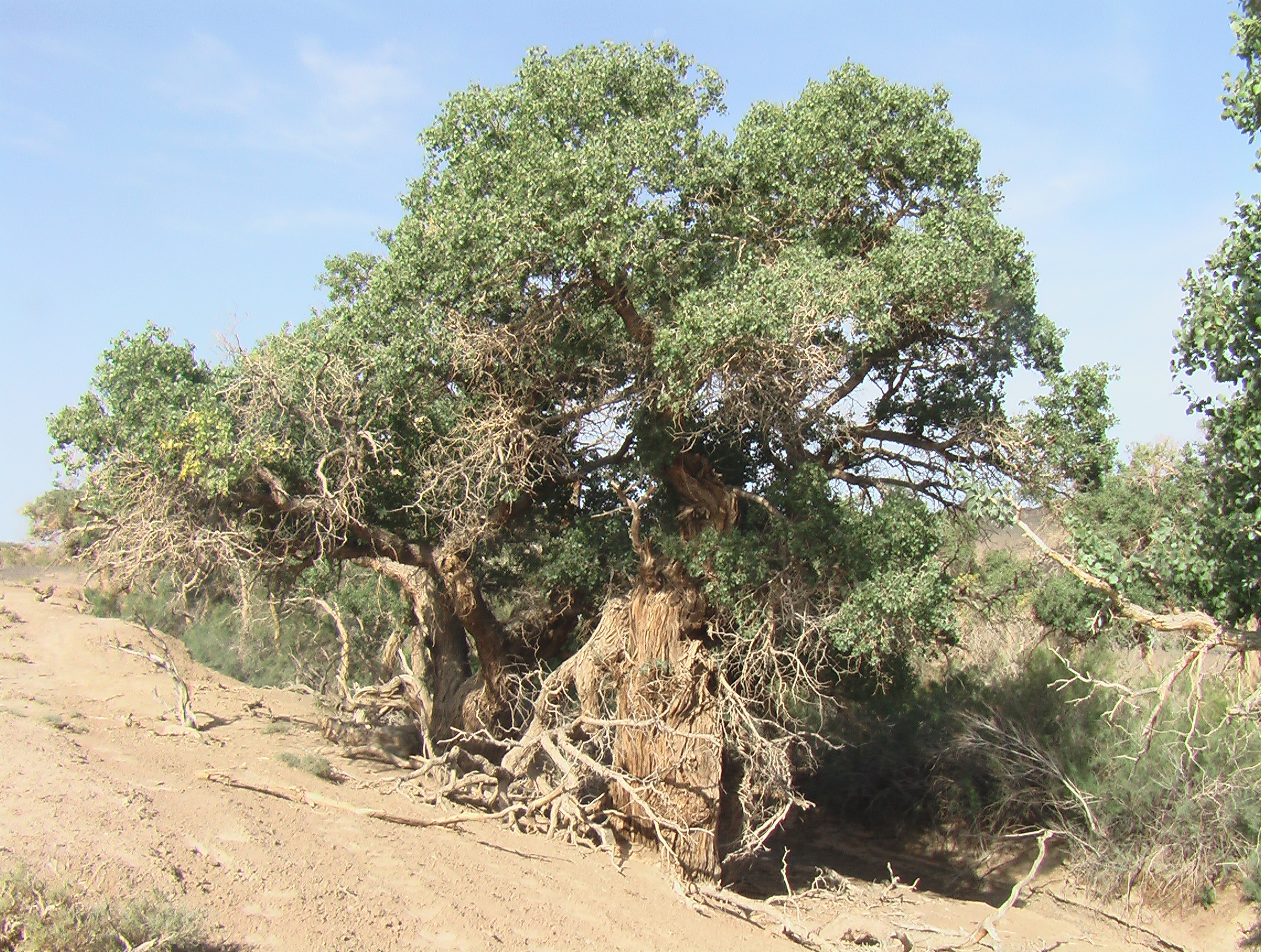
In a tugay in the Gobi Desert.

The Euphrates poplar is a medium-sized deciduous tree that may grow to a height of about 15 m (49 ft)and a girth of 2.5 m (8.2 ft) where conditions are favorable. The stem is typically bent and forked; old stems have thick, rough, olive-green bark. While the sapwood is white, the heartwood is red, darkening to almost black at the center. The roots spread widely but not deeply. The leaves are highly variable in shape.

The flowers are borne as catkins; those of the male are 25–50 mm (0.98–1.97 in) long, and those of the female 50–70 mm (2.0–2.8 in). The fruits are ovoid-lanceolate capsules, 7–12 mm (0.28–0.47 in) long, containing tiny seeds enveloped in silky hairs.

== Distribution and habitat ==
The species has a very wide range, occurring naturally from North Africa, across the Middle East and Central Asia to western China. It may be found in dry temperate broadleaf and mixed forests and subtropical dry broadleaf forests at altitudes of up to 4,000 m (2.5 miles) above sea level.

It is a prominent component of Tugay floodplain ecosystems along river valleys in arid and semi-arid regions, mixed with willow, tamarisk and mulberry in dense thickets. It grows well on land that is seasonally flooded and is tolerant of saline and brackish water. Much used as a source of firewood, its forests have largely disappeared or become fragmented over much of its natural range.

== Uses ==
The species is used in agroforestry to provide leaves as fodder for livestock, timber and, potentially, fiber for making paper. It is also used in afforestation programs on saline soils in desert regions, and to create windbreaks and check erosion. The bark is reported to have Anthelmintic properties.
