= Tigrovaya Balka Nature Reserve =

Nature reserve in Tajikistan

- Location within Tajikistan
- Location: Khatlon Province,Tajikistan
- Coordinates: 37°16′N 68°28′E
- Area: 460 km^{2} (180 sq mi)
- Established: 1953

UNESCO World Heritage Site
- Criteria: Natural: ix
- Reference: 1685
- Inscription: 2023 (45th Session)

Tigrovaya Balka Nature Reserve is a nature reserve in Tajikistan located at the confluence of the Vakhsh and Panj Rivers forming the Amu Darya River. It stretches over 40 km (25 mi) from the south-west to the north-east with an area of 460 km^{2} (180 sq mi).

Tigrovaya Balka State Nature Reserve

== Description ==
Tigrovaya Balka Nature Reserve has been described as the most important nature reserve in Central Asia, because of its large size and ecological diversity. In addition it is very important for rare species of tugay, or riparian forest, ecosystems.

The highest elevations reach about 1,200 m (3,900 ft). The climate is continental and dry, the different habitats of Tigrovaya Balka comprise semideserts, savanna-like grasslands with pistachio trees and tugay vegetation with poplars, Russian silverberry and high grasses.

== Fauna ==
The area was one of the last strongholds of the Caspian tiger, whose tracks were seen in the reserve for the last time in 1953. As of today, Tigrovaya Balka is still home to the original main prey of the tiger, the rare Bactrian deer. Other larger species of the reserve include striped hyenas, golden jackals, swamp cats, wild boars, goitered gazelles, porcupines, introduced nutrias, wolves, red foxes and, in the hills, urials.

=== Birds ===
The reserve has been identified by BirdLife International as an Important Bird Area (IBA) because it supports significant numbers of the populations of various bird species, either as residents, or as overwintering, breeding or passage migrants. These include red-crested pochards, pygmy cormorants, saker falcons, common coots, common cranes, pale-backed pigeons, pallid scops-owls, Egyptian nightjars, white-winged woodpeckers, brown-necked ravens, great tits, desert larks, streaked scrub-warblers, Sykes's warblers, Asian desert warblers, saxaul sparrows and desert finches.
