= Tugay =

Riparian gallery forest habitats in central Asia

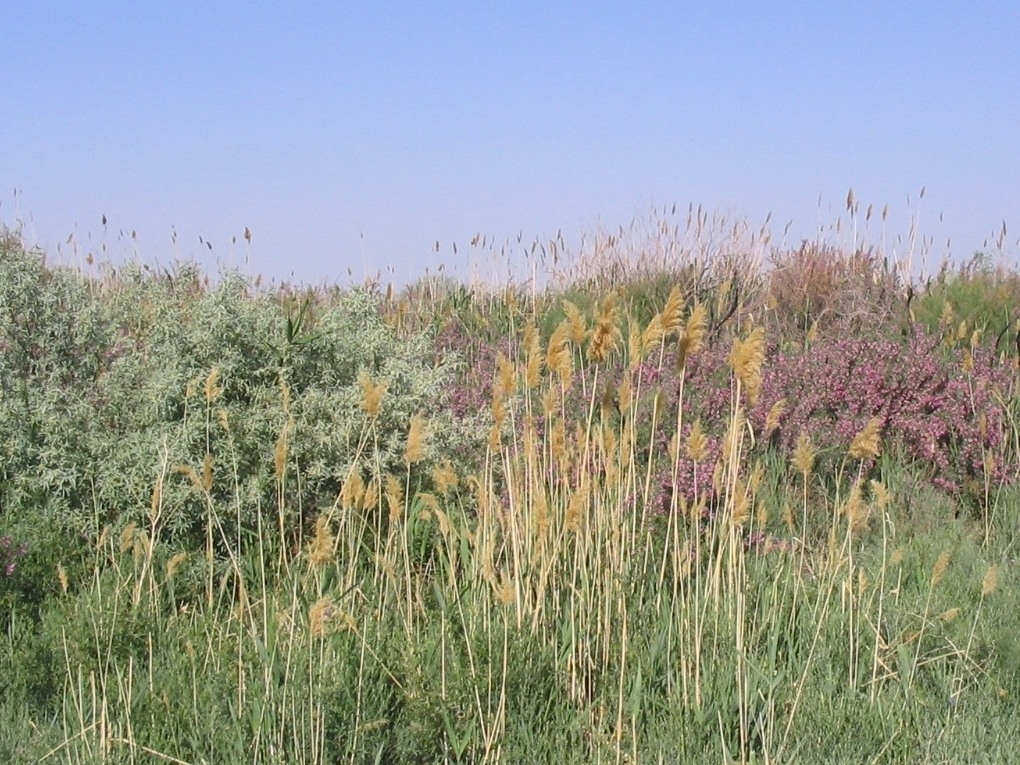
Tugai vegetation along the Syr-Darya in Kazakhstan, Central Asia.

Tugay (Note: From Bashkir: туғай, romanized: tuğay) (Note: Also spelt or romanized as Tugai, Tughay, Tugae, Tougaï, Toogay, etc.) is a form of riparian forest or woodland associated with fluvial and floodplain areas in arid climates. These wetlands are subject to periodic inundation, and largely dependent on floods and groundwater rather than directly from rainfall. Tugay habitats occur in semi-arid and desert climates in Central Asia. Because Tugay habitat is usually linear, following the courses of rivers in arid landscapes, Tugay communities often function as wildlife corridors. They have disappeared or become fragmented over much of their former range.

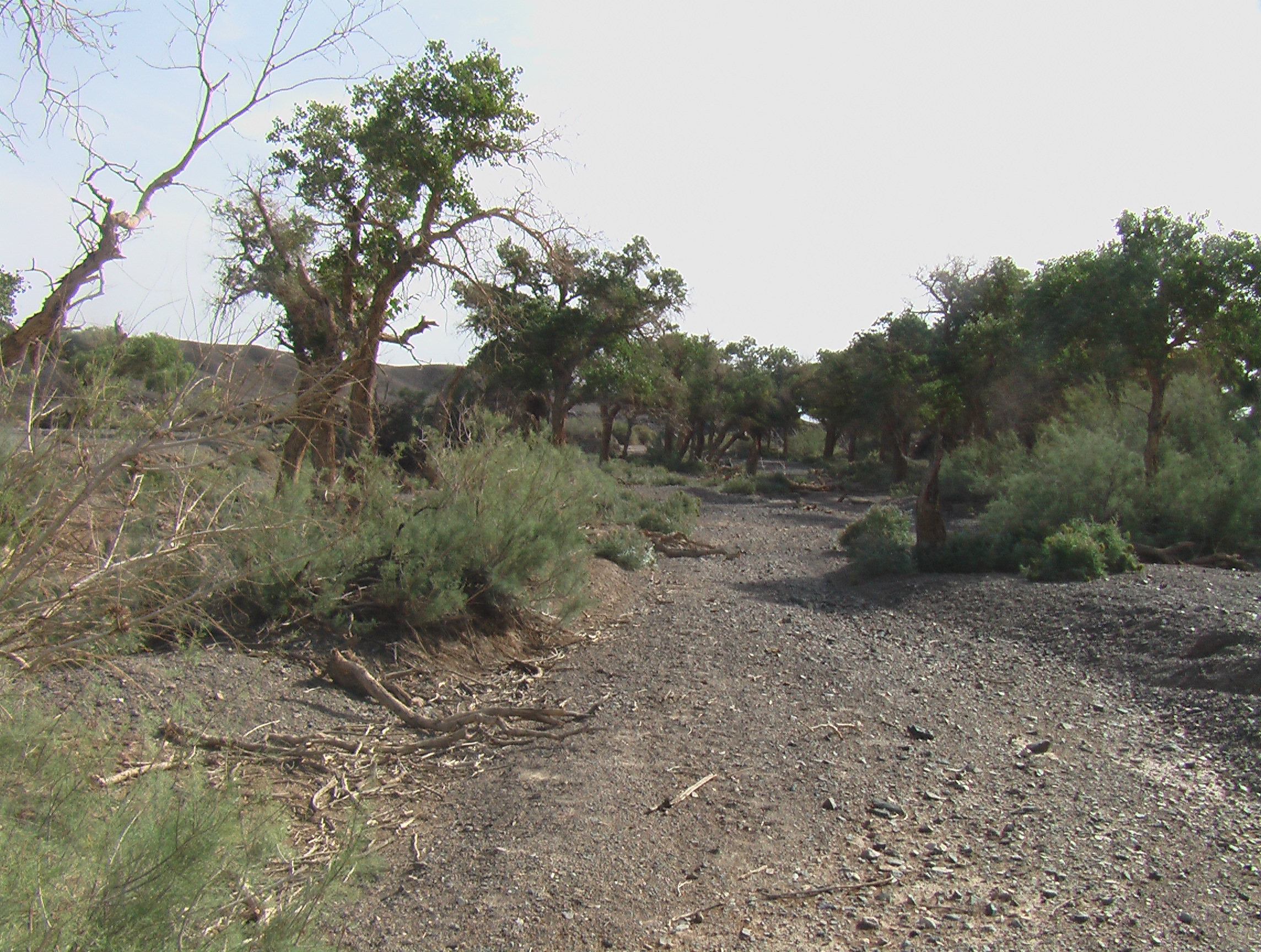
Euphrates poplar trees and tamarix bushes at the Ekhiin-Gol Oasis in the Gobi Desert.

== Distribution ==
The centre of the range of Tugay vegetation is the Tarim Basin in north-western China, where the Tarim Huyanglin nature reserve in the middle reaches of the Tarim River holds the largest areas of intact Tugay forests, with a 1993 estimate of about 61% of the total. The Central Asian countries hold another 31%, with smaller areas remaining in the Middle East and Pakistan. Tugais also occur in the Caucasus.

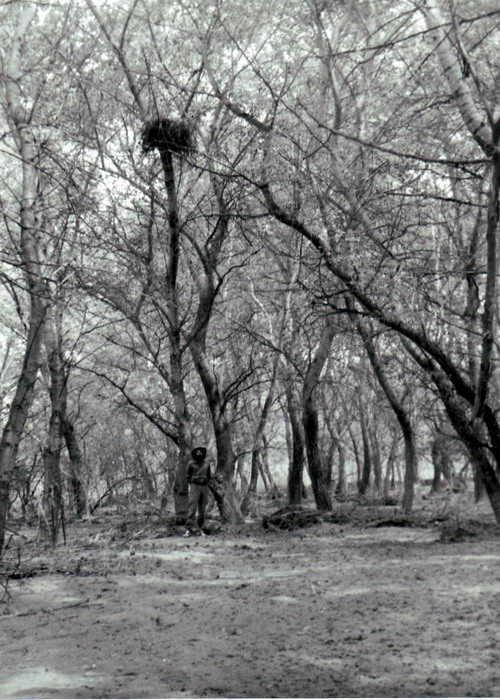
Eastern imperial eagle nest in a tugai forest in Georgia.

== Vegetation ==
Close to rivers and where groundwater levels are shallow, the vegetation is usually dominated by poplars (especially Populus euphratica) and willows such as Salix songarica. Where the forest has been disturbed, other species such as tamarisk, sea-buckthorn and oleaster will grow. Herbaceous plants include reeds, common spike rush, jointleaf rush, fleabane, cocklebur and thorn apple. Grass tugai vegetation is dominated by Phragmites australis, Calamagrostis and Typha. Where the groundwater is deeper, oaks and elms will dominate. The principal causes for the loss of tugai vegetation include dam construction, tree cutting, grazing, and agriculture.

== See also ==
- Bosque, an analogous forest type in arid and semiarid regions of the southwestern United States
