= Sherobod =

Sherobod Uzbek: Sherobod
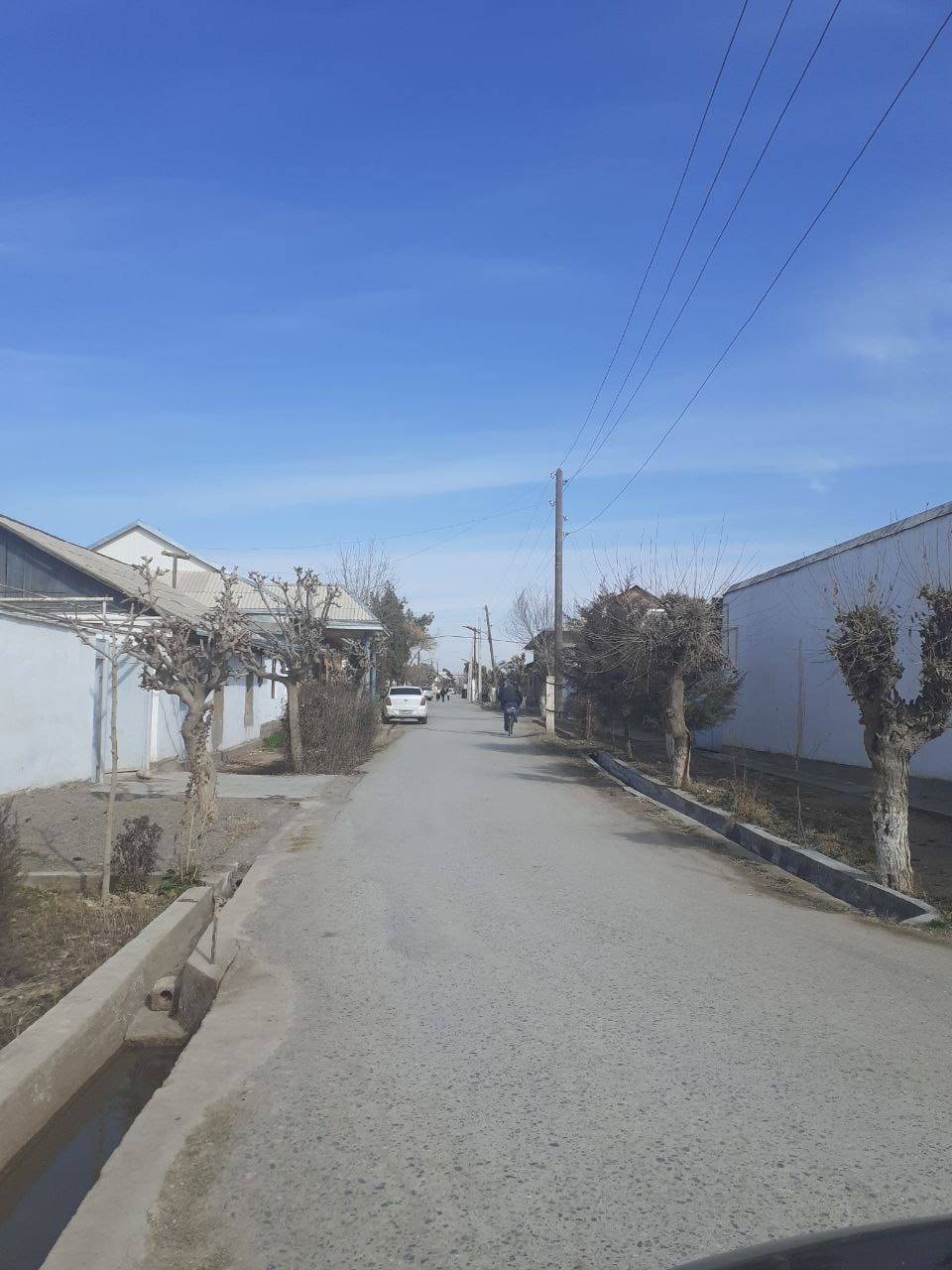

- Location in Uzbekistan
- Coordinates: 37°40′17″N 67°00′56″E
- Country: Uzbekistan
- Region: Surxondaryo Region
- District: Sherobod District

Population (2016)
  - Total: 29,100

Sherobod (Uzbek: Sherobod, Tajik: Шеробод) is a city in Surxondaryo Region, Uzbekistan. It is the seat of Sherobod District. The European route E60 passes through the town.

== Etymology ==
The name is of Persian/Tajiki origin, شیرآباد Šêrâbâd, standing for 'Lion's Lair' ("sher/shir" for lion, and "abad/obod" for English term, abode).

== History ==
Sherobod is a district in the Surxondaryo Region of Uzbekistan. It was established on September 29, 1926. The district is bordered by Boysun to the north, Bandixon to the northeast, Qiziriq to the east, Muzrabot to the south, Angor to the southeast, Qashqadaryo Region to the north, and Turkmenistan to the west. The district covers an area of 2,730 square kilometers. In 2003, it had a population of 134,000 people. Sherobod District includes one city, Sherobod, and 9 rural citizens' assemblies (Bo'ston, Zarabog', Oqqo'rg'on, Rabotak, Sariqamish, Seplon, Talashqon, Chinobod, and Yangiturmush).

== Geography ==
The southern border of the district is traversed by the Zang Canal, while the Sherobod main canal runs from the east. In the vicinity of Oqtosh, Pashxo'rd, and Zarabog villages, there are ancient qanats that have been traditionally used. In the plain areas, there are sandy and loamy soils, while arid areas have rocky soils, and the mountainous regions have clay soils.

== Archaeological findings ==
Archaeological discoveries confirm the antiquity of the Sherobod district. The district's territory is associated with ancient art, with Zaravutsoy petroglyphs, the ancient cities of Jarqoton and Jondavlattepa, and the Nondahana caravanserai (19th-20th centuries) located in the area. The famous Islamic scholar Imam Termizi (Al-Tirmidhi) originated from the present-day Sherobod district in the Islamic world. His mausoleum is preserved within the district's boundaries.

=== Health resorts ===
On the territory of the district, there are sanatoriums and sanatoriums "Aqtosh" and "Vandob".

== Population ==
The city has a mixed Tajik and Uzbek population, with the former boasting a slim majority. Its population is 29,100 (2016).
