= Nurislom Toʻxliyev =

Uzbek academician

- Born: May 6, 1947 (age 79); Jarqoʻrgʻon, Surxondaryo Region, Uzbek SSR
- Citizenship: Soviet Union→Uzbekistan

Nurislom Toʻxliyev (born May 6, 1947) is an Uzbek academic who received many awards and honorary titles including Honored Culture Worker of Uzbekistan (1997) and People's Education Laureate of the Republic of Uzbekistan (2001).

== Biography ==
Nurislom Toʻxliyev was born on May 6, 1947, in Jarkurgan district of Surkhandarya region. He developed a passion for books from his childhood. In 1965, he graduated from a model secondary school and was admitted to the Faculty of History of Samarkand State University. During his student years, his diligence and curiosity motivated him to work hard and devote himself to his profession.

N. Toʻxliyev received education from various scientific institutions. His work and research has focused on political economy and social development, and he has published encyclopedic collections in scientific, political-economic, political-social, and literary fields are commendable.

== Education ==
In 1965, he graduated from a secondary school and enrolled in the Faculty of History of Samarkand State University to pursue higher education. From 1970 to 1973, he continued his studies at the daytime postgraduate course of the Department of Political Economy of the Faculty of Economics of Leningrad (now St. Petersburg) State University. As a researcher, he defended his candidate dissertation in the specialty of “political economy” in 1973.

== Career ==
He started his professional career in 1969 as a teacher of the subject of “political economy” (now “theory of economics”) at Samarkand State Pedagogical Institute. After defending his candidate dissertation, he returned to Samarkand State Pedagogical Institute and continued his teaching career. Along with that, he also held the following positions:

- From 1974, lecturer, head of the lecturers group, deputy director of the department of propaganda and agitation of the Samarkand regional party committee;
- In 1979, instructor of the department of propaganda and agitation of the Central Committee of the Communist Party of Uzbekistan;
- From 1984 to 1989, deputy director and director of the department of science and educational institutions of the Central Committee of the Communist Party of Uzbekistan;
- In 1986, deputy of the Supreme Soviet of Uzbekistan, nominee for the membership of the Central Committee of the Communist Party of Uzbekistan;
- From 1989 to 2009, professor and head of the department at Tashkent State University of Oriental Studies on a part-time basis;
- From 1989 to 2014, director-chief editor of the State Scientific Publishing House “National Encyclopedia of Uzbekistan”;
- Currently, professor of the department of “Islamic economics and finance, pilgrimage tourism” of the International Islamic Academy of Uzbekistan, director of the department of “Islamic Encyclopedia”.

== Works ==
- “Qalbimaga yaqin odamlar” (People close to my heart) - a collection of essays;
- “Onamning mehribon tovushi” (The kind voice of my mother) - an essay written about his mother;
- “Umr lahzasi” (The moment of life);
- “Ustoz” (The teacher);
- “Ustozlar yodi” (The memory of teachers).

== Economic-social publications ==
- Economy of Uzbekistan (Economy of Uzbekistan: Questions and answers);
- "Osiyo va bozor" (Asia and the market) (1992);
- "Bozorga oʻtishning mashaqqatli yoʻli" (The difficult way to the market) (1999);
- "Republic of Uzbekistan" (in Uzbek, Russian, and English) encyclopedic information (2001);
- "Republic of Uzbekistan" (in Uzbek, Russian, and English) encyclopedic information (2007);
- “Moya strana” (My country) (2012);
- "Oʻzbek modeli: taraqqiyot tamoyillari" (Uzbek model: development trends) (2014);
- "Osiyo taraqqiyot modeli" (Asian development model) (2015);
- "Oʻzbekiston iqtisodiyoti" (Economy of Uzbekistan) (2018);
- "Oʻzbekiston iqtisodiyoti anatomiyasi" (Anatomy of Uzbekistan's economy) (2019),
- "Mintaqaviy iqtisodiy integratsiya: rivojlanish qonuniyatlari, xususiyatlari" (Regional economic integration: laws and features of development) (2020);
- "Jahon iqtisodiyoti rivojlanishida yangi trendlar" (New trends in the development of the world economy) (2021).

== Scientific-educational works ==
Author of more than 40 monographs, textbooks and manuals, as well as 13 textbooks and manuals on economics and tourism. More than 200 scientific and scientific-journalistic articles have been published in various newspapers and journals of the republic.

== Titles ==
1. In 1983, he defended his doctoral dissertation in the specialty of “political economy”;
2. In 1993, he received the title of professor in the specialty of “foreign countries’ economy”;
3. In 1997, he was awarded the honorary title of “Cultural Worker of Uzbekistan”;
4. In 2001, he became the “People’s Education Laureate of the Republic of Uzbekistan”;
5. He has supervised 3 doctoral and 20 candidate students.
