= Solar power in Uzbekistan =

Uzbekistan is a country in Central Asia with a growing demand for electricity. Solar power can play a role in meeting this demand, as the country has abundant solar resources and a strong potential for solar energy generation. The government of Uzbekistan has implemented several initiatives to promote the use of solar power, including the development of large-scale solar power plants and the introduction of incentives for individuals and businesses to install solar panels. Benefits of solar power include reduced dependence on fossil fuels, lower greenhouse gas emissions, and improved energy security.

== Government policies ==
The Law on the Use of Renewable Energy Sources (RES Law, 2019), introduced in May 2019, sets the fundamental framework for faster RES development. It specifies the guidelines and support schemes for renewable energy producers and defines the obligations of governmental bodies in promoting renewable energy.

== Potential ==
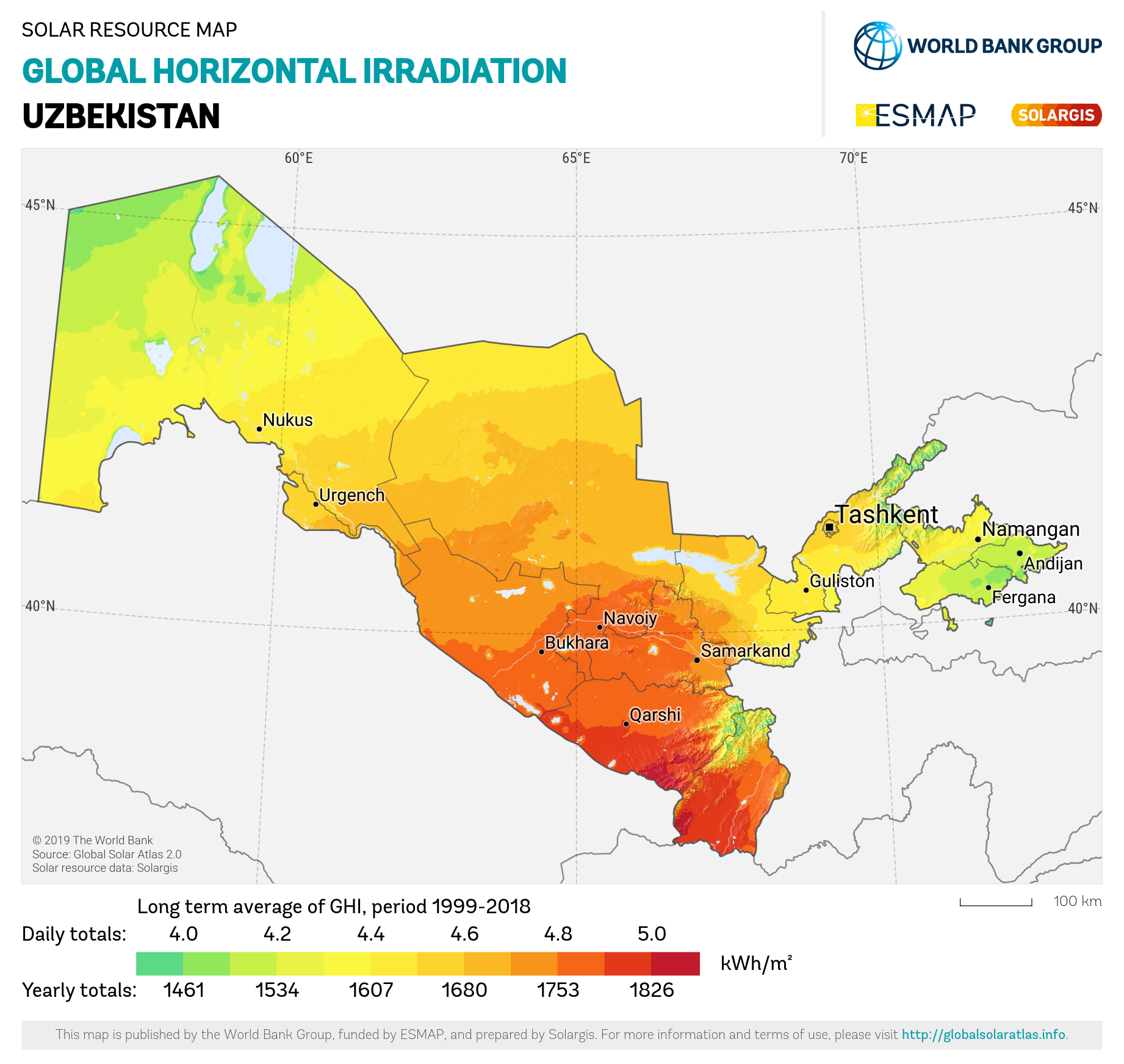
Solar potential

Uzbekistan has great potential for solar energy due to its high levels of solar radiation and large areas of barren land that can be used for solar power plants. The country receives an average of around 300 sunny days per year, making it an ideal location for solar power generation.

Tashkent sun hours/day

View chart definition.

Termez sun hours/day

View chart definition.

Source: ECMWF Data

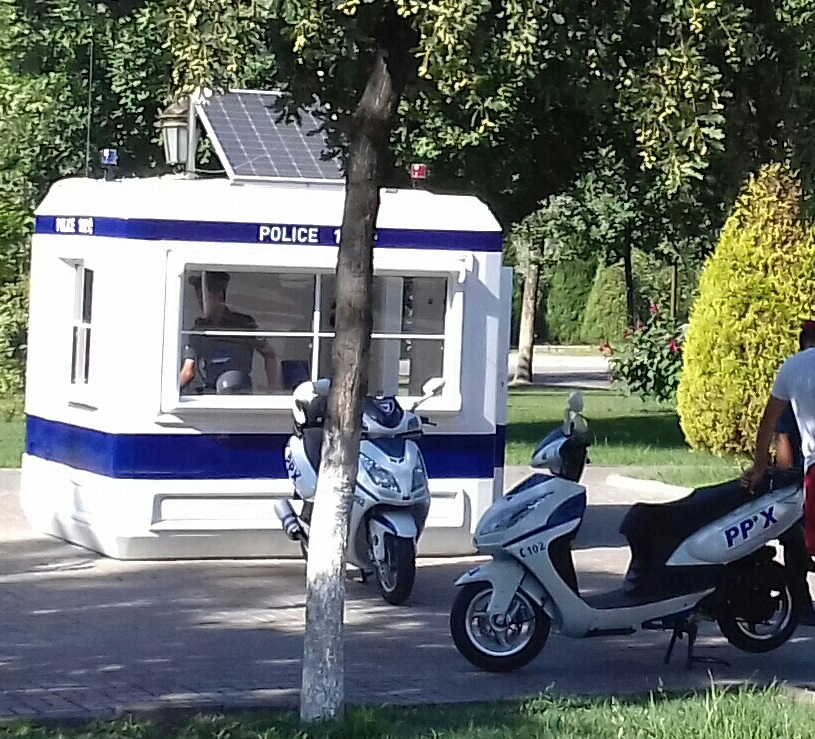
Police box with solar panel

== Photovoltaics ==
=== Large scale photovoltaic power stations ===
==== Current ====
Largest photovoltaic power stations
| PV power station | Location | Capacity in MWp | Commissioning | Developer | Notes/ref |
|---|---|---|---|---|---|
| Nur Navoi Solar park | Karmana | 100 | 2021 | Masdar | |
| Nurabad Solar park | Nurobod | 100 | 2022 | Total Eren | |
| Samarkand Solar park | Kattakurgan | 220 | 2024 | Masdar | |
| Chuponota Solar park | Samarkand | 20 | 2023 | | |
| Pop Solar park | Pop | 200 | 2024 | Next Solar Energy Group | |
| Karaulbazar Solar park | Karaulbazar | 500 | 2024 | | |
| Yukorichirchik Solar park | Yukorichirchikq | 400 | 2024 | Acwa Power | |
| Jizzakh Solar park | G'allaorol | 220 | 2024 | Masdar | |
| Nishon Solar park | Nishon | 500 | 2024 | | |
| Karmana Solar park | Karmana, Navoiy | 100 | 2024 | Masdar | |

==== Future ====
Announced large-scale solar PV projects
| PV power station | Location | Capacity in MWp | Year | Developer | BESS, MWh | Notes/ref |
|---|---|---|---|---|---|---|
| Sherabad Solar park phase I | Sherobod | 200 | | Masdar | | Under construction |
| Sherabad Solar park phase II | Sherobod | 300 | | Masdar | | |
| Guzor Solar park | G'uzor | 300 | | Masdar | | Announced tender on 3 December 2022 |
| Uch-Uchak Solar Project | Khorazm Region | 123 | 2024 | Voltalia SA | | |

Other small photovoltaic (PV) power plants
| PV power station | Capacity in MWh | Notes/ref |
|---|---|---|
| Amirsoy Solar Park | 1 | 1MWh capacity solar park to aim eco-resort |
| Yangiobod Solar Park | 0,13 | One of the first solar parks in Uzbekistan, commissioned in 2015 |
| Uratasaroy Solar park | 0,04 | Constructed by Korean Energy Agency (KEA), annual output 100,000kWh |

=== Rooftop ===
In addition to mega-scale solar projects, small- to medium-scale solar projects including rooftop solar PV become attractive to developers and consumers thanks to appropriate policy targets and measures. Off-grid solar energy systems could secure clean energy supply in remote areas with good solar resources but no access to the grid.

=== Residential solar PV ===
Uzbekistan is actively developing, with the assistance of the World Bank, a targeted program to install two-kilowatt solar panels in 150,000 private houses. Installation work was planned to be carried out from 2021 to 2023. Also, funds were allocated by local governments for the installation of solar panels in the apartments of low-income families. Because the cost of installing solar panels is high relative to the income of the population, they are not becoming widely popular despite state subsidies.

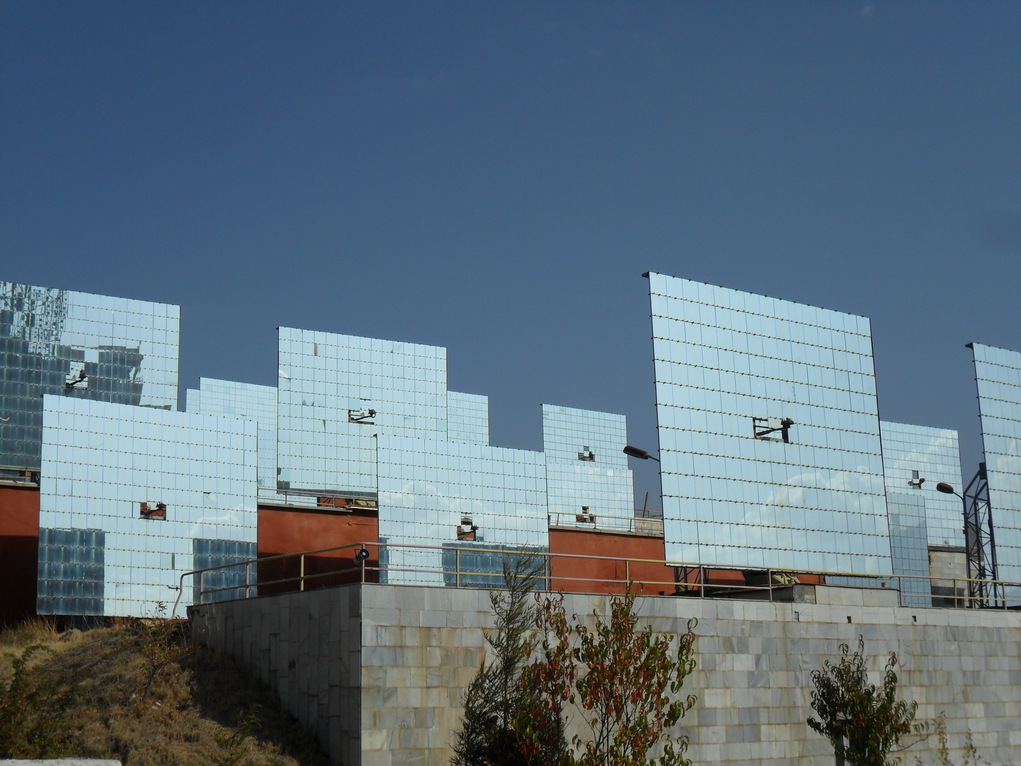
Mirrors of solar furnace in Parkent

=== Non-residential PV ===
Installation of solar panels on schools, governmental offices, hospitals and public buildings is accelerated by the Law on the Use of Renewable Energy Sources (adopted in May 2019). The Cabinet of Ministers of Uzbekistan joined the "green" energy movement by installing a 0,63MWh solar photovoltaic station at the building of the Cabinet of Ministers of the Republic of Uzbekistan. In2022, 300kWh capacity solar panels were installed at Tashkent city hall building, 100kWh at the Tashkent branch of Mendeleev Institute, and the State Tax Committee became 80% self-sufficient by solar.

== Research and development ==
The International Institute of Solar Energy, part of Academy of Sciences of the Republic of Uzbekistan, is a center for research, development, and testing of solar power technologies. The solar furnace in Parkent is used in the research and scientific processes of the Materials Science Institute of Academy of Sciences of the Republic of Uzbekistan. The facility has a total capacity of 1,000 kW and is heated and processed by solid state fusion processes and sunlight.

== See also ==
- Energy in Uzbekistan
