= Qoraqir =

Dehqonbirlashuv Qoraqir
- Sign of the village

- Location in Uzbekistan
- Coordinates: 37°27′50″N 67°09′00″E
- Country: Uzbekistan
- Region: Surxondaryo Region

Government
  - Type: Village Citizens' Assembly

Population (2005)
  - Total: 5,000

Qoraqir is a small village near to Angor district in the Surxondaryo Province region of Uzbekistan.

== Background ==
The village is mostly known for its diversity of farming and craftsmanship over the country. The most notable person in the neighborhood of makhalla is "Chorshanbiev Beg'am" who was the governor of the Dekhqonbirlashuv makhalla.
