= Uzun =

Uzun may refer to:

== Places ==
- Uzun, Iran, a village in Zanjan Province, Iran
- Uzun, Tajikistan a Jamoat in Tajikistan
- Uzun, Uzbekistan, a village in Uzbekistan
- Uzun District in Uzbekistan
- Uzun, Kuqa, a town in Kuqa, Aksu Prefecture, Xinjiang Uyghur Autonomous Region, China

== People ==
- Uzun-Hajji (1848–1920), North Caucasian religious, military, and political leader; Emir of the North Caucasian Emirate
- Ahmet Uzun (born 1950), Turkish Cypriot politician
- Grigorii Uzun (born 1986), Moldovan Gagauz businessman and politician
- Mehmed Uzun (1953–2007), Turkish Kurdish writer
- Salih Uzun (born 1970), Turkish politician
- Serra Uzun (born 2002), Turkish female wheelchair basketball player
- Sevgi Uzun (born 1997), Turkish professional basketball player
- Şoray Uzun (born 1967), Turkish comedian, writer and television host
