= Hurriyat, Uzbekistan =

Hurriyat
- urban-type settlement
- Location in Uzbekistan
- Coordinates: 37°53′04″N 67°38′12″E
- Country: Uzbekistan
- Region: Surxondaryo Region
- District: Qumqoʻrgʻon District
- Urban-type settlement: 1992

Population (2004)
  - Total: 4,000
- Time zone: UTC+5 (UZT)

Hurriyat (Uzbek: Hurriyat, Russian: Хуррият) is an urban-type settlement in Surxondaryo Region, Uzbekistan. It is part of Qumqoʻrgʻon District. The town population in 2004 was 4,000 people.
