= Kakaydi =

- urban-type settlement
- Location in Uzbekistan
- Coordinates: 37°34′35″N 67°30′23″E
- Country: Uzbekistan
- Region: Surxondaryo Region
- District: Jarqoʻrgʻon District
- Urban-type settlement: 1942

Population (2002)
  - Total: 6,500
- Time zone: UTC+5 (UZT)

Kakaydi (Uzbek: Kakaydi, Russian: Какайды) is an urban-type settlement in Surxondaryo Region, Uzbekistan. It is part of Jarqoʻrgʻon District. The town population in 2002 was 6,500 people.
