= Termiziy Mausoleum =

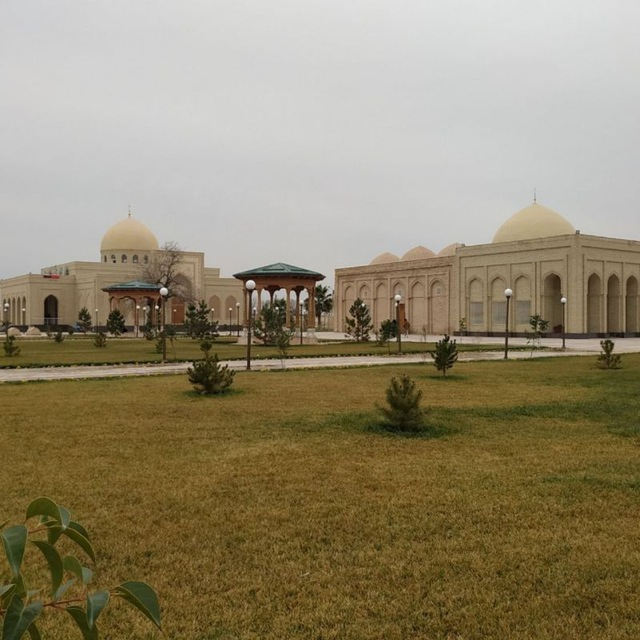
- Termiziy Mausoleum in 2012
- Interactive map of the Termiziy Mausoleum area

General information
- Architectural style: Islamic
- Location: Sherobod district, Surxondaryo Region, Uzbekistan
- Coordinates: 37.244°N 67.284°E
- Year built: 11th-12th centuries
- Renovated: 1980-1981, 2001-2002

Technical details
- Material: Brick, ceramic, marble

The Termiziy Mausoleum (also known as Abu Iso Termiziy Mausoleum) is an architectural monument built between 11th and 12th centuries, located in Sherobod district of Surxondaryo Region, Uzbekistan. The mausoleum was built over the grave of the famous hadith scholar Abu Iso Muhammad Termiziy.

== History ==
The Termiziy Mausoleum is part of the Hakim at-Termiziy complex. In addition to the mausoleum, the complex includes buildings such as a mosque, a khanqah, and a library. The complex was rebuilt several times over the years. A library was built in the eastern part of the mausoleum wall in the style of a vault. Also, near the mausoleum, the mausoleum of Hakim at-Termiziy’s son al-Hakim Abdulloh was built in the 10th century. In the 11th-12th centuries, a three-domed prayer hall mosque was also built.

During the Timurid rule (15th century), the khanqah was rebuilt with a half-meter thick brick wall. The vaulted rooms were also renovated. The mihrab in the western part of the mosque was built in the same period. The main renovation works of the mausoleum were carried out during the reign of Abdullaxon (1583—1598). A new nine-domed mosque was built in the courtyard. Also, a simple portico was installed at the entrance. A small mausoleum and a shrine were built on the south side of the entrance. In addition, this mausoleum was connected to the Termiziy Mausoleum and the khanqah by arched passages.

== Architecture ==
Today, the monument is in the form of a rectangular building consisting of 4 rooms (sections) connected by arches. The rooms are 4.3 x 4.5 meters in size. The north-eastern style portico was added later. The three-room section is square-shaped, and the southern one is considered the burial chamber. It has a marble tombstone. The tombstone has three arches, decorated with muqarnas patterns and inscriptions. The burial chamber is accessed through a long corridor from the dome. The khanqah floor is lower than the burial chamber, and they are separated by a wide arch. The khanqah has a domed roof and a mihrab. Two rooms next to it lead to the north-eastern style portico. The three porticos in front of the khanqah are domed, with arched windows and doors, and four arches on the walls, covered with carved bricks. The Termiziy Mausoleum is decorated with ceramic ornaments, and six-brick relief patterns are applied to the exterior walls. The domes have white ceramic windows. The arches are as thick as bricks. The Termiziy Mausoleum has a small dome-shaped pavilion on the roof.

== Academic research ==
The monument was first mentioned by D. N. Logofet in his travel sketches. V. L. Voronina conducted architectural measurements in 1945.

Scientific research was carried out at the Hakim at-Termiziy Mausoleum in 1955—1957. As a result, its 14th-15th century appearance was restored.

== Renovation ==
The mausoleum was renovated in 1980—1981. In 2001—2002, the mausoleum and khanqah sections were fully equipped. The marble tombstone in the mausoleum was moved to the Termiz Museum warehouse. A copy of the original tombstone was made and installed by modern craftsmen. The Termiziy Mausoleum was renovated on the occasion of the 660th anniversary of Amir Temur’s birth. Its tombstone and ceramic windows were reinstalled.
