= Surhan Gas Chemical =

Uzbekistan oil and gas company

- Industry: Oil and gas
- Headquarters: Uzbekistan
- Area served: Uzbekistan
- Key people: Andrey Ignatov (CEO)
- Website: https://www.sgc-oc.com/

Surhan Gas Chemical is a company from Uzbekistan who managing the works on additional exploration and development of the largest field of Uzbekistan "25 years of independence" under the terms of the Production Sharing Agreement.

== History ==
6 April 2017 was signed the production sharing agreement with investment block «Uzbekiston Mustakilligi» with additional exploration and development of field "25 years of independence" in Surxondaryo Region of Uzbekistan.

As part of the project to develop the gas field "25 years of independence" was created Surhan Gas Chemica Operating Company who began work on additional exploration on 26 September 2017.

25 January 2018 Surhan Gas Chemica Operating Company started work on the construction of an appraisal well in the field "25 years of independence".

== Activity ==
Operating Company of gas field "25 years of independence" Surhan Gas Chemical works in the following areas:

- Field development.
- Construction of gas processing complex.
- Additional exploration of the Baysun investment block.

Term is 35 years. At the first stage will create capacities for gas production and processing. The area of the investment block is 3,600 sq. km.

== Management ==
Investors of Surhan Gas Chemical are ALTMAX HOLDING LTD, Gas Project Development Central Asia AG, «Uzneftegazdobicha».

CEO is Andrey Ignatov.
