= Elbayon =

- urban-type settlement
- Location in Uzbekistan
- Coordinates: 37°56′43″N 67°42′44″E
- Country: Uzbekistan
- Region: Surxondaryo Region
- District: Shoʻrchi District

Population (2003)
  - Total: 4,900
- Time zone: UTC+5 (UZT)

Elbayon (Uzbek: Elbayon / Элбаён) is an urban-type settlement in Surxondaryo Region, Uzbekistan. It is part of Shoʻrchi District. The town population in 2003 was 4900 people.
