= Solar furnace of Uzbekistan =

Solar thermal energy

Solar Furnace of Uzbekistan
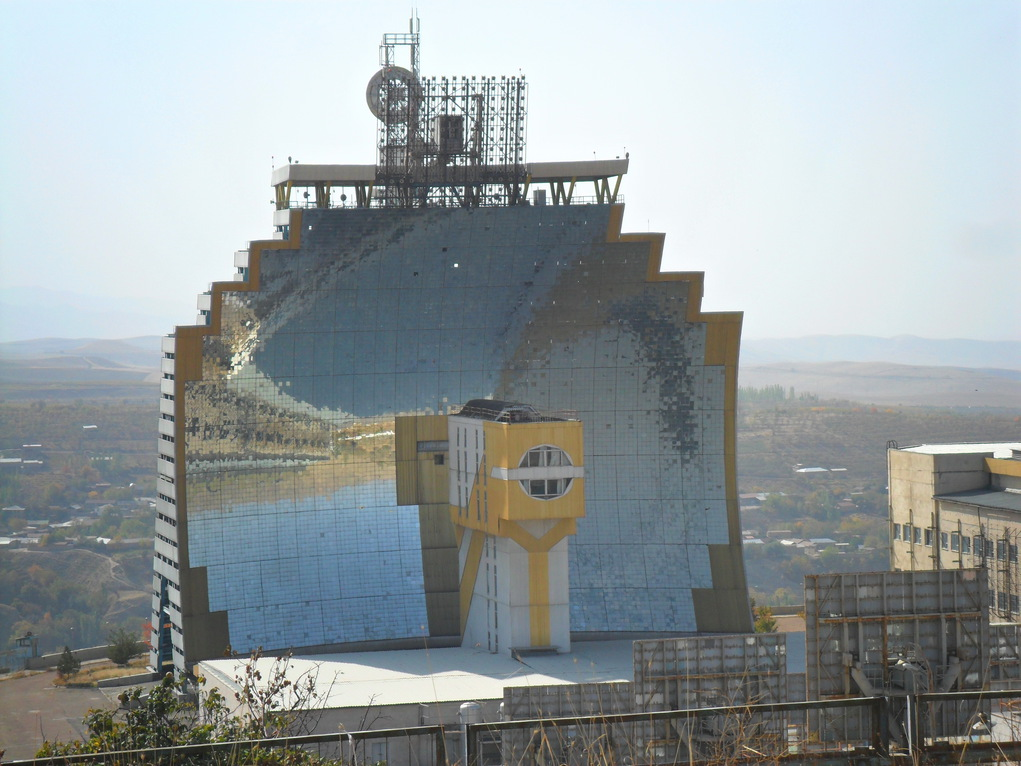
- Solar concentrator
- Country: Uzbekistan
- Location: Parkent, Tashkent Region
- Coordinates: 41°19′N 69°44′E
- Status: Operational
- Commission date: 1987
- Owner: Uzbekistan

Solar farm
- Collectors: 10,700 mirrors
- Total collector area: 1,849 square meters

Power generation
- Nameplate capacity: 1 MW

External links
- Commons: Related media on Commons

UNESCO World Heritage Site
- Official name: Big Solar Furnace (Sun Heliocomplex)
- Part of: Tashkent Modernist Architecture. Modernity and Tradition in Central Asia
- Criteria: Cultural: iv
- Reference: 1766
- Inscription: 2026 (48th Session)

The solar furnace of Uzbekistan was built in 1981, and is located 45 kilometers away from Tashkent city, in Parkent, Tashkent Region. The furnace is the largest in Asia. It uses a curved mirror, or an array of mirrors, acting as a parabolic reflector, which can reach temperatures of up to 3,000 degrees Celsius. The solar furnace of Uzbekistan can be visited by the general public.

In July 2026, the Big Solar Furnace, along with nine other modernist sites in Tashkent, was designated by UNESCO as a World Heritage Site.

== Description ==
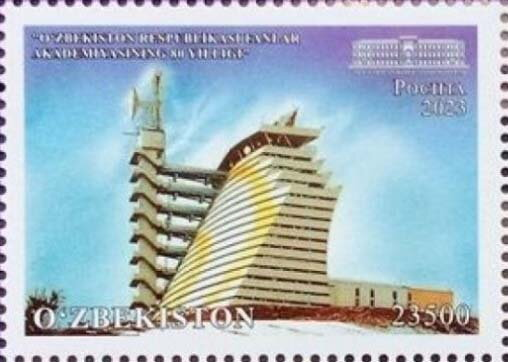
The solar furnace, as featured in a 2024 stamp of Uzbekistan

The solar furnace produces high-temperature heat using concentrated sunlight, without generating combustion-related pollutants at the point of heat production. There are different ways of using this energy, such as hydrogen fuel production, foundry applications and high temperature testing. The solar furnace of Uzbekistan is sometimes called the Sun Institute of Uzbekistan. The furnace is a complex optical and mechanical construction, with 63 flat mirrors automatically controlled to track the sun in unison and redirect the solar thermal energy towards the crucible. The furnace was first opened in May 1981, and it is located 1100 meters above sea level. The furnace covers a huge area in the mountains, and consists of 4 complex subdivisions, which are: the main building of “Solar furnace of Uzbekistan”, heliostatic field, concentrator and manufacturing tower. The solar furnace of Uzbekistan was ready for use in 6 years, which means it was built between the years of 1981 and 1987. The place for the solar furnace of Uzbekistan was chosen carefully, because the sun shines there for 270 days a year. The small solar furnace at the complex has a diameter of 2 meters. The heliostatic field of the solar furnace of Uzbekistan currently consists of about 62 heliostats which are installed in a staggered order. The field uses 12090 mirrors in total, and is the largest concentrator in the world, with an area of 1849 square meters. The concentrator at the furnace uses 10,700 mirrors, and the southern part of the concentrator is covered with special sunscreens. The solar furnace of Uzbekistan is controlled by employees from the laboratory on the 6th floor, and the observation ground is located on the highest spot.

== Links ==
- Solar energy and technologies in Uzbekistan
- Solar Furnace in Uzbekistan
- Solar energy news in Uzbekistan
- News about the solar institute in Uzbekistan
- News about the solar technologies in Uzbekistan

== See also ==
- Solar power tower
- Solar thermal energy
- Odeillo solar furnace
