= Sariosiyo District =

Sariosiyo
- District
- Sariosiyo tumani
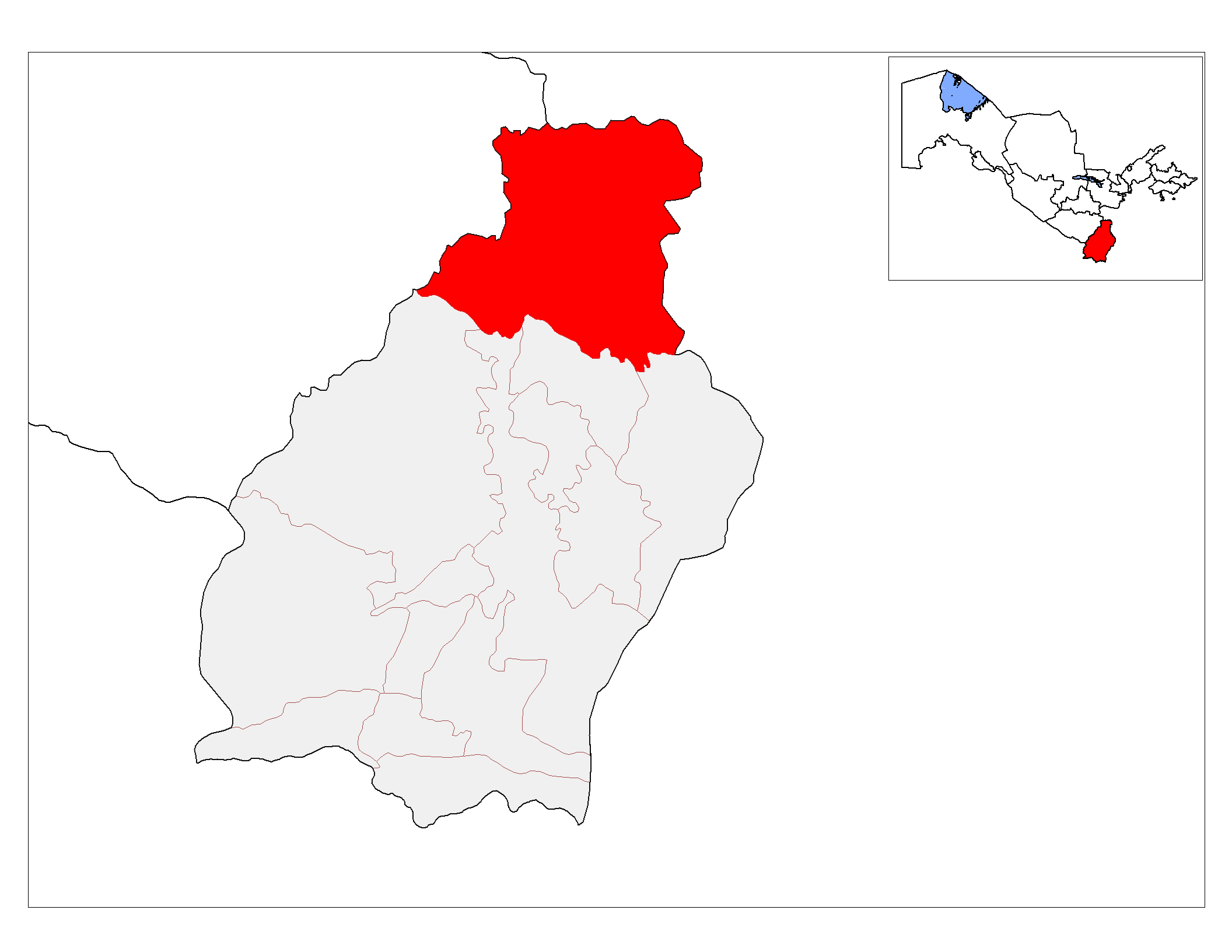
- Country: Uzbekistan
- Region: Surxondaryo Region
- Capital: Sariosiyo
- Established: 1992

Area
  - Total: 3,930 km^{2} (1,520 sq mi)

Population (2021)
  - Total: 213,200
  - Density: 54.2/km^{2} (141/sq mi)
- Time zone: UTC+5 (UZT)

Sariosiyo district (Uzbek: Sariosiyo tumani / Сариосиё тумани) is a district in Surxondaryo Region, Uzbekistan. Its capital is the town of Sariosiyo. It has an area of 3,930 km^{2} (1,520 sq mi) and its population is 213,200 (2021 est.). The district consists of one city (Shargʻun), 4 urban-type settlements (Sariosiyo, Yangihayot, Tortuli, Boʻyropoʻsht) and 9 rural communities (Dashnobod, Navroʻz, Buyuk kelajak, Sangardak, Bogʻi iram, Soʻfiyon, Toqchiyon, Oʻzbekiston, Xufar).

Sariosiyo district was founded on September 29, 1926. It was merged into Denov District on December 24, 1962, and re-established on February 22, 1964. The center of Sariosiyo district is 180 km north of the regional capital Termez.
