= Parkent =

Parkent Parkent
- City
- Location in Uzbekistan
- Coordinates: 41°17′40″N 69°40′35″E
- Country: Uzbekistan
- Region: Tashkent Region
- District: Parkent District
- Town status: 1984

Population (2016)
  - Total: 60,200
- Time zone: UTC+5 (UZT)

Parkent (Uzbek: Parkent) is a city in Tashkent Region, Uzbekistan. It is the capital of Parkent District. Its population is 60,200 (2016). It is home to the Solar furnace of Uzbekistan which is the largest solar furnace in the world by mirror surface area.
