= Qarluq, Uzbekistan =

Qarluq
- urban-type settlement
- Location in Uzbekistan
- Coordinates: 38°11′48″N 67°41′42″E
- Country: Uzbekistan
- Region: Surxondaryo Region
- District: Oltinsoy District

Population (2016)
  - Total: 3,900
- Time zone: UTC+5 (UZT)

Qarluq (Uzbek: Qarluq, Қарлуқ or Qorliq / Қорлиқ, Russian: Карлук, romanized: Karluk) is an urban-type settlement in Surxondaryo Region, Uzbekistan. It is the administrative center of Oltinsoy District. Its population was 3,842 people in 1989, and 3,900 in 2016.
