= Oltinsoy District =

Coordinates: 38.1967°N 67.6950°E

Oltinsoy
- District
- Oltinsoy tumani
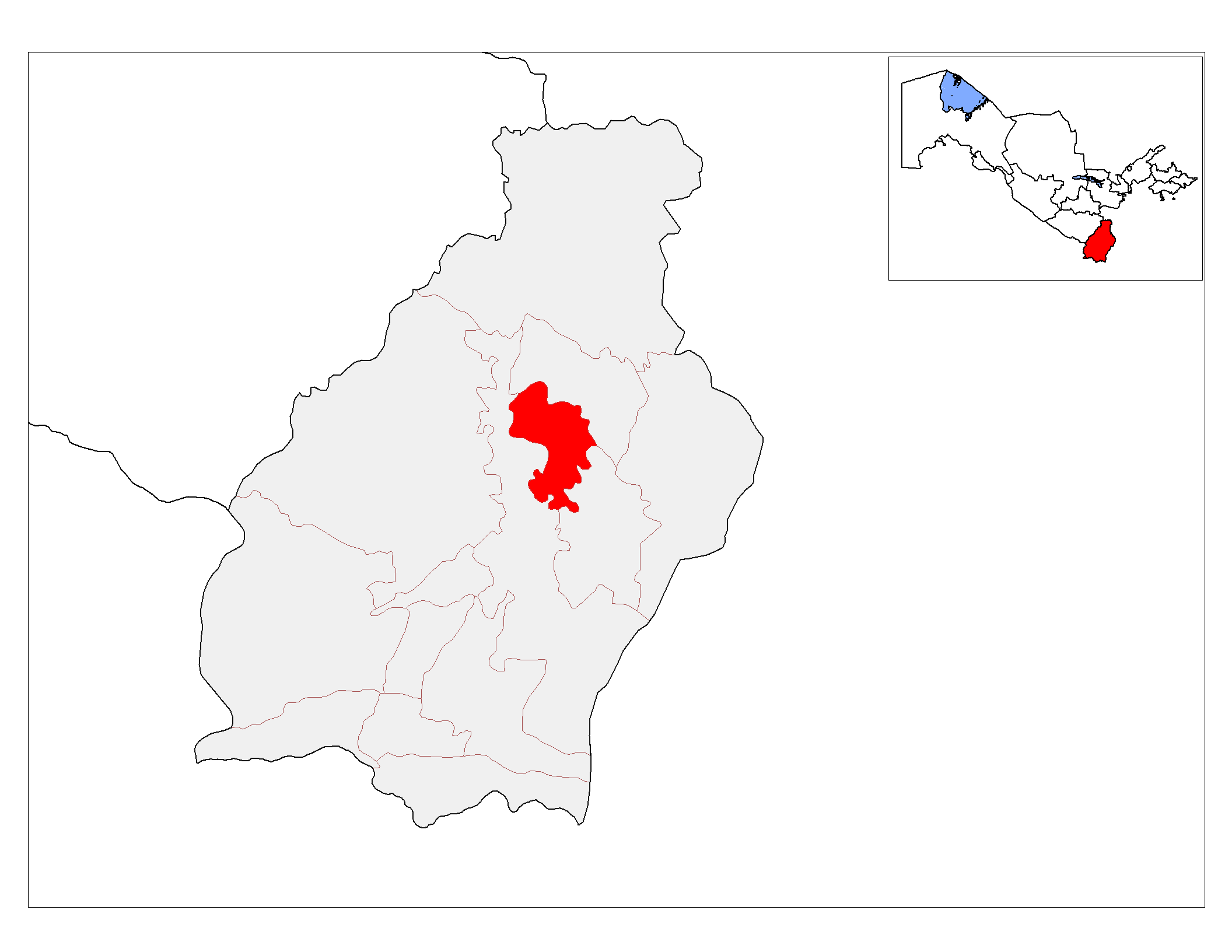
- Country: Uzbekistan
- Region: Surxondaryo Region
- Capital: Qarluq
- Established: 1981

Area
  - Total: 570 km^{2} (220 sq mi)

Population (2021)
  - Total: 180,200
  - Density: 320/km^{2} (820/sq mi)
- Time zone: UTC+5 (UZT)

Oltinsoy is a district of Surxondaryo Region in Uzbekistan. The capital lies at the town Qarluq. It has an area of 570 km^{2} (220 sq mi) and its population is 180,200 (2021 est.).

The district consists of 14 urban-type settlements (Qarluq, Botosh, Jobu, Ipoq, Qurama, Boʻston, Mormin, Xayrandara, Xoʻjasoat, Chep, Shakarqamish, Ekraz, Yangiqurilish, Gulobod) and 9 rural communities.
