= Shoʻrchi District =

Coordinates: 38.0000°N 67.7833°E

Shoʻrchi
- District
- Shoʻrchi tumani
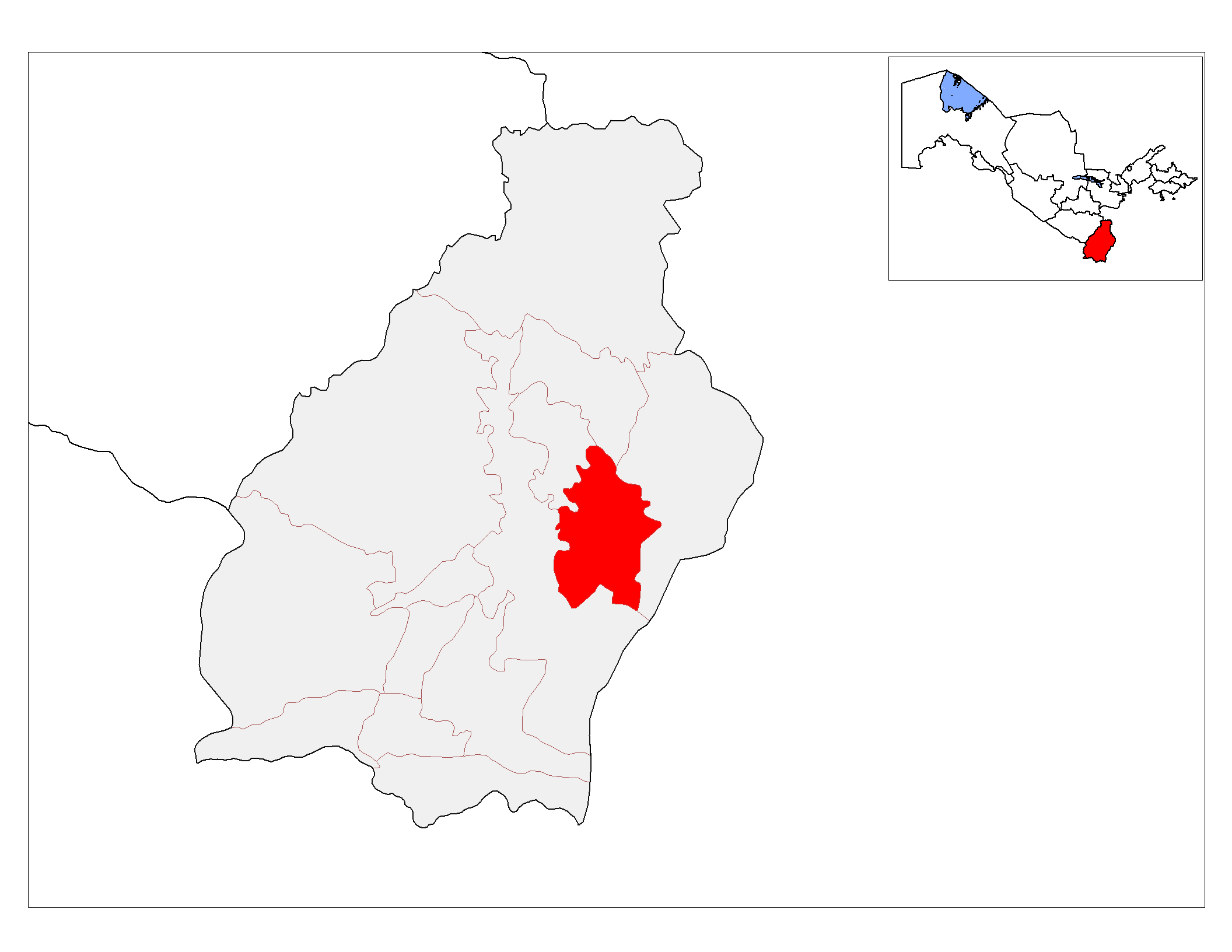
- Country: Uzbekistan
- Region: Surxondaryo Region
- Capital: Shoʻrchi
- Established: 1935

Area
  - Total: 850 km^{2} (330 sq mi)

Population (2021)
  - Total: 212,700
  - Density: 250/km^{2} (650/sq mi)
- Time zone: UTC+5 (UZT)

Shoʻrchi (Uzbek: Shoʻrchi tumani) is a district of Surxondaryo Region in Uzbekistan. The capital lies at the city Shoʻrchi. It has an area of 850 km^{2} (330 sq mi) and its population is 212,700 (2021 est.).

== Settlements ==
The district consists of one city (Shoʻrchi), 10 urban-type settlements (Elbayon, Toʻla, Yalti, Xushchekka, Qoʻshtegirmon, Kattasovur, Karvon, Gʻarmaqoʻrgʻon, Jarqishloq, Joyilma) and 10 rural communities (Qoʻldosh, Alpomish, Baxtlitepa, Savur, Elobod, Sohibkor, Dalvarzin, Jaloir, Shoʻrchi, Yangibozor).

== Natives ==
- Shavkat Rakhmonov ― UFC welterweight Mixed-Martial artist is born in Shoʻrchi.
