= Sariq =

- urban-type settlement
- Location in Uzbekistan
- Coordinates: 37°40′20″N 67°14′15″E
- Country: Uzbekistan
- Region: Surxondaryo Region
- District: Qiziriq District
- Urban-type settlement: 1992
- Elevation: 366 m (1,201 ft)

Population
  - Total: 13,700
- Time zone: UTC+5 (UZT)

Sariq (Uzbek: Sariq, Russian: Сарик) is an urban-type settlement in Surxondaryo Region, Uzbekistan. It is the administrative center of Qiziriq District.
