= Qumqoʻrgʻon =

- City
- Location in Uzbekistan
- Coordinates: 37°49′40″N 67°35′50″E
- Country: Uzbekistan
- Region: Surxondaryo Region
- District: Qumqoʻrgʻon District
- Town status: 1971

Population (2016)
  - Total: 14,900
- Time zone: UTC+5 (UZT)

Qumqoʻrgʻon (Uzbek: Qumqoʻrgʻon/Қумқўрғон, Russian: Кумкурган, romanized: Kumkurgan) is a city in Surxondaryo Region, Uzbekistan. It is the administrative center of Qumqoʻrgʻon District. The town population was 12,173 people in 1989, and 14,900 in 2016.
