= UzPost =

National postal service of Uzbekistan

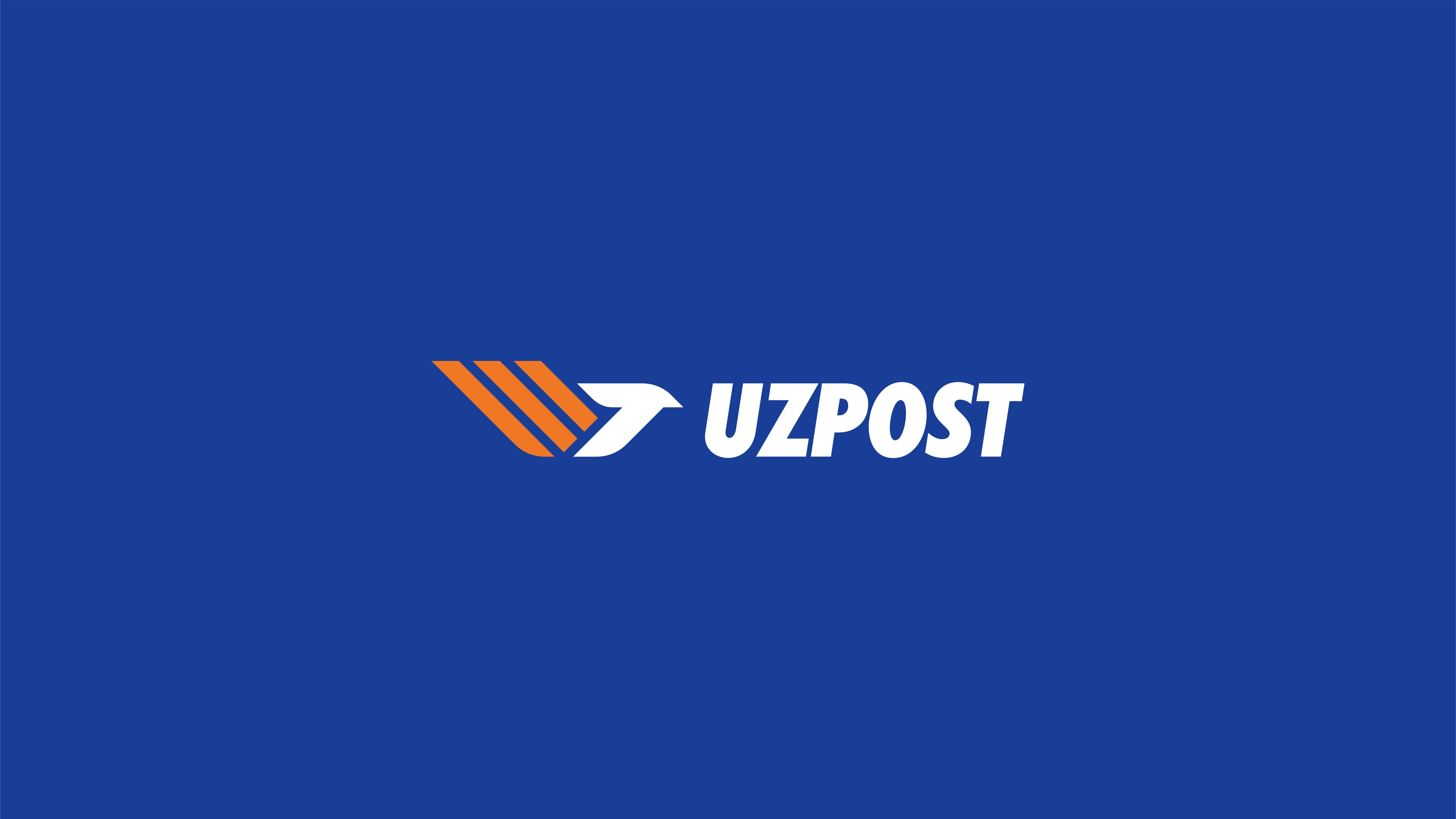
- Trade name: "O'zbekiston pochtasi" aksiyadorlik jamiyati
- Type: Open joint-stock company
- ISIN: UZ7005280001
- Industry: Postal services, courier
- Founded: 1991
- Headquarters: Tashkent, Uzbekistan
- Area served: Uzbekistan, Worldwide
- Services: Letter post, parcel service, EMS, delivery, Financial services
- Owner: Government of Uzbekistan
- Website: uz.post

UzPost (Uzbek: "O'zbekiston pochtasi" ochiq aksiyadorlik jamiyati, Russian: ОАО «Узбекистон почтаси») is the company responsible for postal service in Uzbekistan and was established in 1991, after the collapse of the USSR. Since 2014, the company is an open joint stock company.

== Universal Postal Union ==
UzPost joined the Universal Postal Union as the "Post of Uzbekistan" on 24 February 1994.

== Branches ==
The Post operates the following 16 branch offices:

- Karakalpak branch
- Andijan branch
- Bukhara branch
- Jizzakh branch
- Qashqadaryo branch
- Navoiy branch
- Namangan branch
- Samarkand branch
- Sirdaryo branch
- Surxondaryo branch
- Fergana branch
- Khorezm branch
- Tashkent branch
- "Toshkent pochtamti" branch
- "Xalqaro pochtamti" branch
- "O'zbekiston markasi" PA

== History ==
The first stamps of Uzbekistan were issued on 7 May 1992. Before then, Uzbekistan used stamps of the Soviet Union. In 1993 and 1995, the Uzbekistan Post Office resorted to overprinting stamps of the Soviet Union as supplies of the new Uzbek stamps ran low.
