= Bandixon District =

Bandixon
- District
- Bandixon tumani
- Location within Uzbekistan
- Coordinates: 37.8500°N 67.3667°E
- Country: Uzbekistan
- Region: Surxondaryo Region
- Capital: Bandixon
- Established: 2019

Area
  - Total: 378.91 km^{2} (146.30 sq mi)

Population (2021)
  - Total: 76,500
  - Density: 202/km^{2} (523/sq mi)
- Time zone: UTC+5 (UZT)

Bandixon is a district of Surxondaryo Region in Uzbekistan. The administrative center of the district is located at the town of Bandixon. It has an area of 379 km^{2} (146 sq mi) and its population is 76,500 (2021). The district was first established in 1992, and it was abolished and merged into Qiziriq District in 2010. It was re-established in 2019 from part of the Qiziriq and Boysun Districts.
