= Shargʻun =

- Location in Uzbekistan
- Coordinates: 38°27′36″N 67°58′01″E
- Country: Uzbekistan
- Region: Surxondaryo Region
- District: Sariosiyo District

Population (2016)
  - Total: 11,400
- Time zone: UTC+5 (UZT)

Shargʻun (Uzbek: Shargʻun / Шарғун) is a city in Surxondaryo Region, Uzbekistan. It is part of Sariosiyo District. The town population was 10,716 people in 1989, and 11,400 in 2016.
