= Angor, Uzbekistan =

Angor
- urban-type settlement
- Location in Uzbekistan
- Coordinates: 37°27′50″N 67°09′00″E
- Country: Uzbekistan
- Region: Surxondaryo Region
- District: Angor District

Population (1989)
  - Total: 8,801
- Time zone: UTC+5 (UZT)

Angor (Uzbek: Angor / Ангор, Russian: Ангор) is an urban-type settlement in Surxondaryo Region, Uzbekistan. It is the administrative center of Angor District.

== History ==
Angor has a long and interesting history. Settlements existed in this area as early as the 6th–4th centuries BC. During the Kushan Empire, especially between the 1st and 3rd centuries AD, agriculture developed significantly in the area.

The ancient Zartepa fortress was an important center in the territory. In later centuries, different fortresses and settlements were established there. Historically, Angor was also located on trade routes leading to Termiz and served as a stopping place for trading caravans.

Angor, to this day, counts with a varied shopping district, which means its still a shopping destination for people nearby.

The modern Angor District was first established on April 16, 1952. In December 1962, it was incorporated into Termiz District. It was later re-established as a separate district in 1979.

== Meaning of the Name “Angor” ==
According to official information about the district, the word “Angor” means “a field from which grain has already been harvested.”

The name is closely connected with the agricultural character of the area.
