= Uchqizil =

Urban-type settlement in Surxondaryo Region, Uzbekistan

- urban-type settlement
- Location in Uzbekistan
- Coordinates: 37°20′40″N 67°14′1″E
- Country: Uzbekistan
- Region: Surxondaryo Region
- District: Termiz District

Population (2016)
  - Total: 3,700
- Time zone: UTC+5 (UZT)

Uchqizil (Uzbek: Uchqizil, Учқизил, Russian: Учкызыл) is an urban-type settlement in Surxondaryo Region, Uzbekistan. It is the administrative center of Termiz District. Its population was 3,408 people in 1989, and 3,700 in 2016.
