= Sariosiyo =

- urban-type settlement
- Location in Uzbekistan
- Coordinates: 38°24′48″N 67°57′26″E
- Country: Uzbekistan
- Region: Surxondaryo Region
- District: Sariosiyo District
- Urban-type settlement status: 1983

Population
  - Total: 14,300
- Time zone: UTC+5 (UZT)

Sariosiyo (Uzbek: Sariosiyo/Сариосиё, Russian: Сариасия, Persian: سرآسیا) is an urban-type settlement in Surxondaryo Region, Uzbekistan. It is the administrative center of Sariosiyo District. The town population in 1989 was 11,082 people.
