= Qumqoʻrgʻon District =

Coordinates: 37°55′N 67°35′E

Qumqoʻrgʻon
- District
- Qumqoʻrgʻon tumani
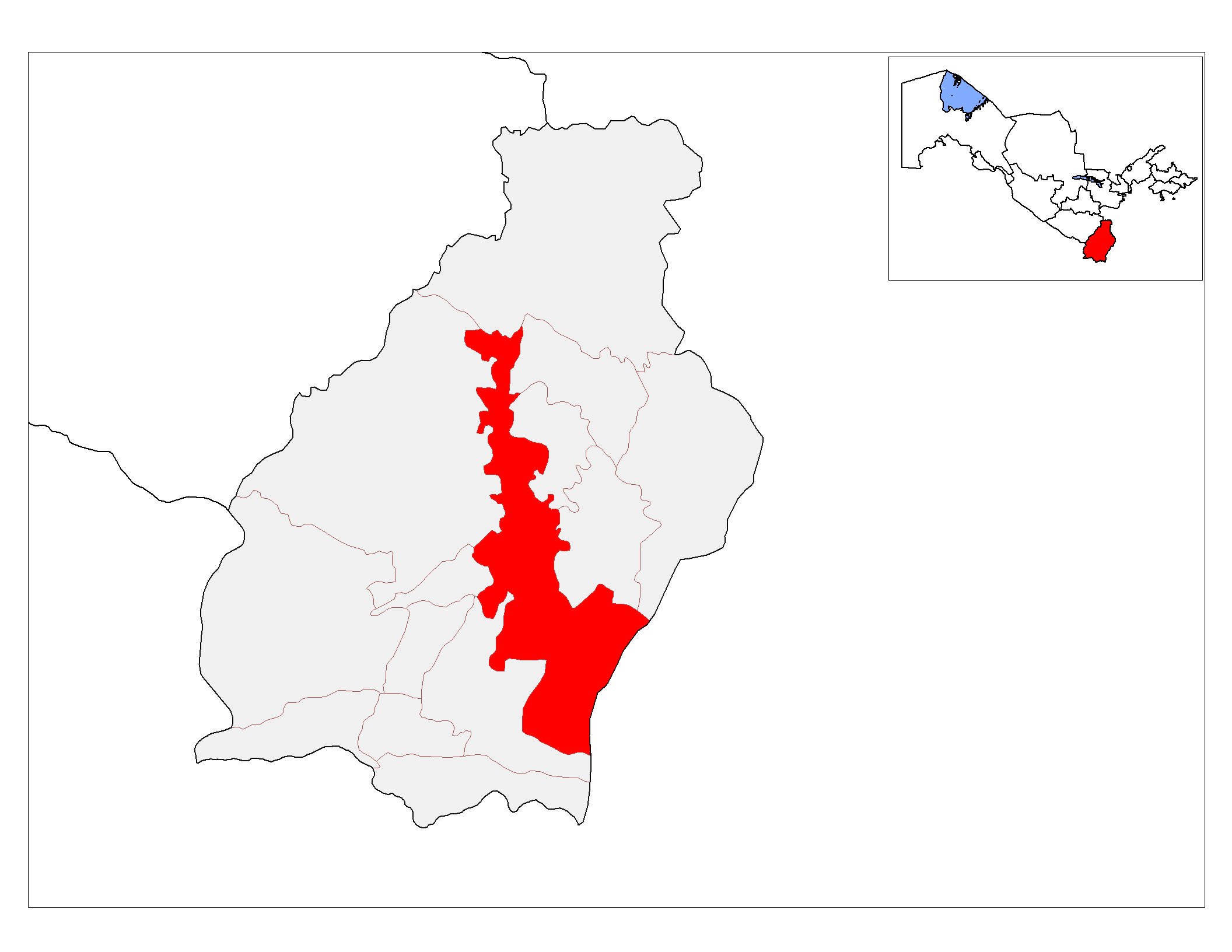
- Country: Uzbekistan
- Region: Surxondaryo Region
- Capital: Qumqoʻrgʻon
- Established: 1977

Area
  - Total: 2,200 km^{2} (850 sq mi)

Population (2021)
  - Total: 238,600
  - Density: 110/km^{2} (280/sq mi)
- Time zone: UTC+5 (UZT)

Qumqoʻrgʻon (Uzbek: Qumqoʻrgʻon tumani) is a district of Surxondaryo Region in Uzbekistan. The capital lies at the city Qumqoʻrgʻon. It has an area of 2,200 km^{2} (850 sq mi) and its population is 238,600 (2021 est.).

The district consists of one city (Qumqoʻrgʻon), 11 urban-type settlements (Hurriyat, Elbayon, Elobod, Azlarsoy, Bogʻora, Oqsoy, Jiydali, Navbahor, Qarsoqli, Yangiyer, Jaloir) and 8 rural communities (Oqqapchigʻay, Jaloir Qoʻrgʻoni, Sheroziy, Oqjar, Qumqoʻrgʻon, Yuqori Kakaydi, Ketmon, Arslonboyli).
