= Postage stamps and postal history of Uzbekistan =

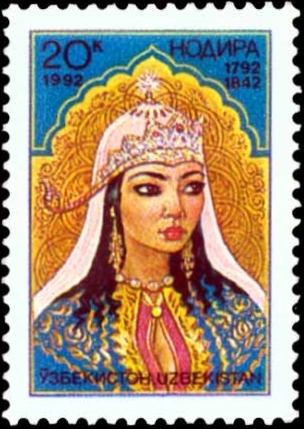
The first stamp of independent Uzbekistan in 1992

This is a survey of the postage stamps and postal history of Uzbekistan.

Uzbekistan, officially the Republic of Uzbekistan (Uzbek: O‘zbekiston Respublikasi or Ўзбекистон Республикаси), is a doubly landlocked country in Central Asia, formerly part of the Soviet Union. It has been an independent republic since December 1991. Currently, postal service is provided by O′zbekiston Pochtasi.

== First stamps ==
The first stamps of Uzbekistan were issued on 7 May 1992. Before then, Uzbekistan used stamps of the Soviet Union.

== Overprints ==
In 1993 and 1995 the Uzbekistan Post resorted to overprinting stamps of the Soviet Union as supplies of the new Uzbeki stamps ran low.
