= Termiz District =

Coordinates: 37.34°N 67.23°E

Termiz
- District
- Termiz tumani
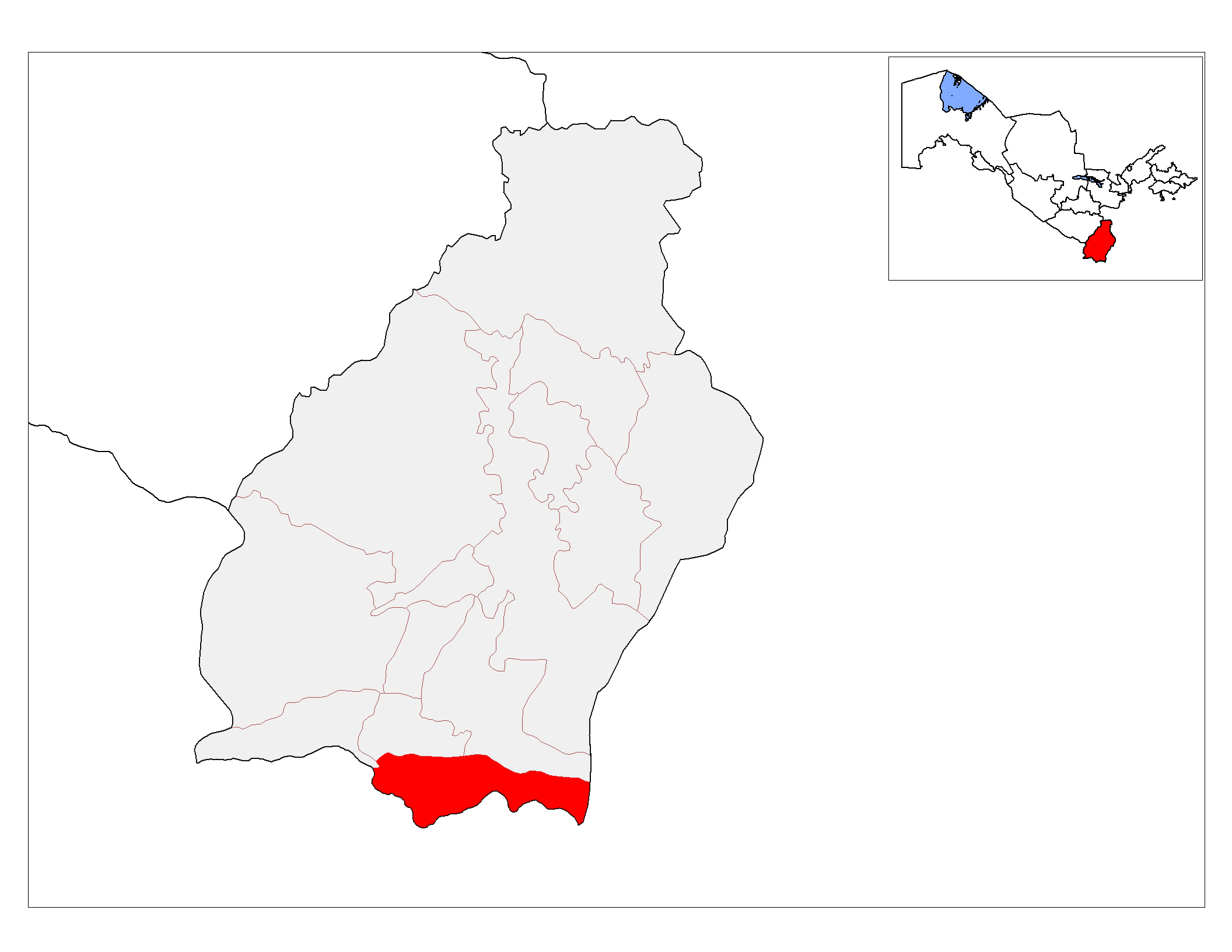
- Country: Uzbekistan
- Region: Surxondaryo Region
- Capital: Uchqizil
- Established: 1926

Area
  - Total: 860 km^{2} (330 sq mi)

Population (2021)
  - Total: 78,600
  - Density: 91/km^{2} (240/sq mi)
- Time zone: UTC+5 (UZT)

Termiz is a district of Surxondaryo Region in Uzbekistan. It surrounds the city Termez (Termiz), which is not part of the district. Its seat is the town Uchqizil. It has an area of 860 km^{2} (330 sq mi) and its population is 78,600 (2021 est.). The district consists of 9 urban-type settlements (Uchqizil, Limonchi, Tajribakor, Namuna, At-Termiziy, Mustaqillik, Pattakesar, Chegarachi, Qizilboy) and 5 rural communities.
