= Xalqobod, Surxondaryo Region =

Xalqobod (Muzrabot tuman markazi)
- urban-type settlement
- Location in Uzbekistan
- Coordinates: 37°27′35″N 66°55′20″E
- Country: Uzbekistan
- Region: Surxondaryo Region
- District: Muzrabot District
- Urban-type settlement status: 2009

Population (2016)
  - Total: 9,200
- Time zone: UTC+5 (UZT)

Xalqobod (Uzbek: Xalqobod, Russian: Халкабад, romanized: Khalkabad, formerly Komsomolabad) is an urban-type settlement in Surxondaryo Region, Uzbekistan. It is the administrative center of Muzrabot District. Its population was 7,515 people in 1989, and 9,200 in 2016.
