= Jarqoʻrgʻon =

- City
- Location in Uzbekistan
- Coordinates: 37°30′30″N 67°25′00″E
- Country: Uzbekistan
- Region: Surxondaryo Region
- District: Jarqoʻrgʻon District
- Town status: 1973

Population (2016)
  - Total: 22,700
- Time zone: UTC+5 (UZT)

Jarqoʻrgʻon (Uzbek: Jarqoʻrgʻon/Жарқўрғон, Russian: Джаркурган, romanized: Dzharkurgan) is a city in Surxondaryo Region, Uzbekistan. It is the capital of Jarqoʻrgʻon District. The population was 17,687 in 1989, and 22,700 in 2016. The 12th century Jarkurgan minaret is located in the village Minor, some 5 km southwest of Jarqoʻrgʻon.

== History ==
The name Jarkurgan historically originated from the place located on the edge of a jar (clay pit). In the 8th to 12th centuries, Jarkurgan was known as Charmangan (Sarmangan) and mentioned in Arab-Persian geographical literature with various names. In the 8th century, it was under Arab rule, in the 10th century, it was controlled by the Ghaznavids, in the 11th century, by the Seljuks, and in the first half of the 12th century by the Ghorids of Bamyan. In the early 13th century, it came under the control of the Khwarazmshahs. During that time, Jarkurgan (Charmangan) was located in 2 parasangs (an old Persian measure of distance) to the south of Termiz. Due to its favorable geographical location, Jarkurgan has been an important agricultural center since ancient times. The name of the region comes from the name of the Surkhan (Persian-Tajik: "red") river that flows through the oasis.

== Economy ==
In 1929, the construction of the Y. (year) led to the rapid growth of J. city in the 1930s, driven by the opening of several oil fields. Crude oil was extracted from the vicinity of the city. There are cotton gins, construction materials factories, the "Jarqoʻrgʻon-Neft" oil company, oil rig repair workshops, a sewing factory, an automobile transport depot, fuel storage, and agricultural produce collection warehouses in the city.

== Population ==
1959	1970	1979	1989	2005
7,049	11,558	13,989	17,687	20,900

== Notable people ==
- Eldor Shomurodov (born 1995), football player
