= Shoʻrchi =

- City
- Location in Uzbekistan
- Coordinates: 38°00′40″N 67°47′15″E
- Country: Uzbekistan
- Region: Surxondaryo Region
- District: Shoʻrchi District
- Town status: 1976

Population (2016)
  - Total: 25,000
- Time zone: UTC+5 (UZT)

Shoʻrchi (Uzbek: Shoʻrchi/Шўрчи, Russian: Шурчи, romanized: Shurchi) is a city in Surxondaryo Region, Uzbekistan. It is the administrative center of Shoʻrchi District. The town population was 16,560 people in 1989, and 25,000 in 2016. It is mentioned in the works of Kudain and Ibn Khurdadbeh that there was a village of Barangi in the Shorchi region. There were several mosques in Barangi in the 11th and 12th centuries.

== Economy ==
In the city of Shorchi, there are "Grain products", "Shorchipakhta" joint-stock companies, a printing house, MTP, a household service association for the population, "Shorchimebel" company, a felting factory, 2 bread factories, "Istiqlol" shoe production enterprise, a large elevator of the republic, mills, small and joint enterprises, firms are working. The city is home to enterprises in the light and food industries and construction materials. There is also a textile factory "Mo'min tekstil". There is a large bazaar, dealers of the company "Akfa", branches of "Artel", airline ticket offices, gas stations, and 2 hotels ("Ideal" and "Sherdor").

== Infrastructure ==
There is general education, children's music schools, 2 special boarding schools, and a specialized boarding school. There are 9 vocational colleges (colleges of agriculture, communal economy, medicine, light industry, household service, agro-industry, and economics). The district central library and its branches, the city library, the library for the blind, the culture and recreation park (light park), the district central hospital, the polyclinic, the pharmacy, and other medical institutions provide services to the population.

== Population ==
1979	1989	2005	2022
11,208	16,560	21,600	30,800
