= Parkent District =

Coordinates: 41.2933°N 69.6808°E

Parkent
- District
- Parkent tumani
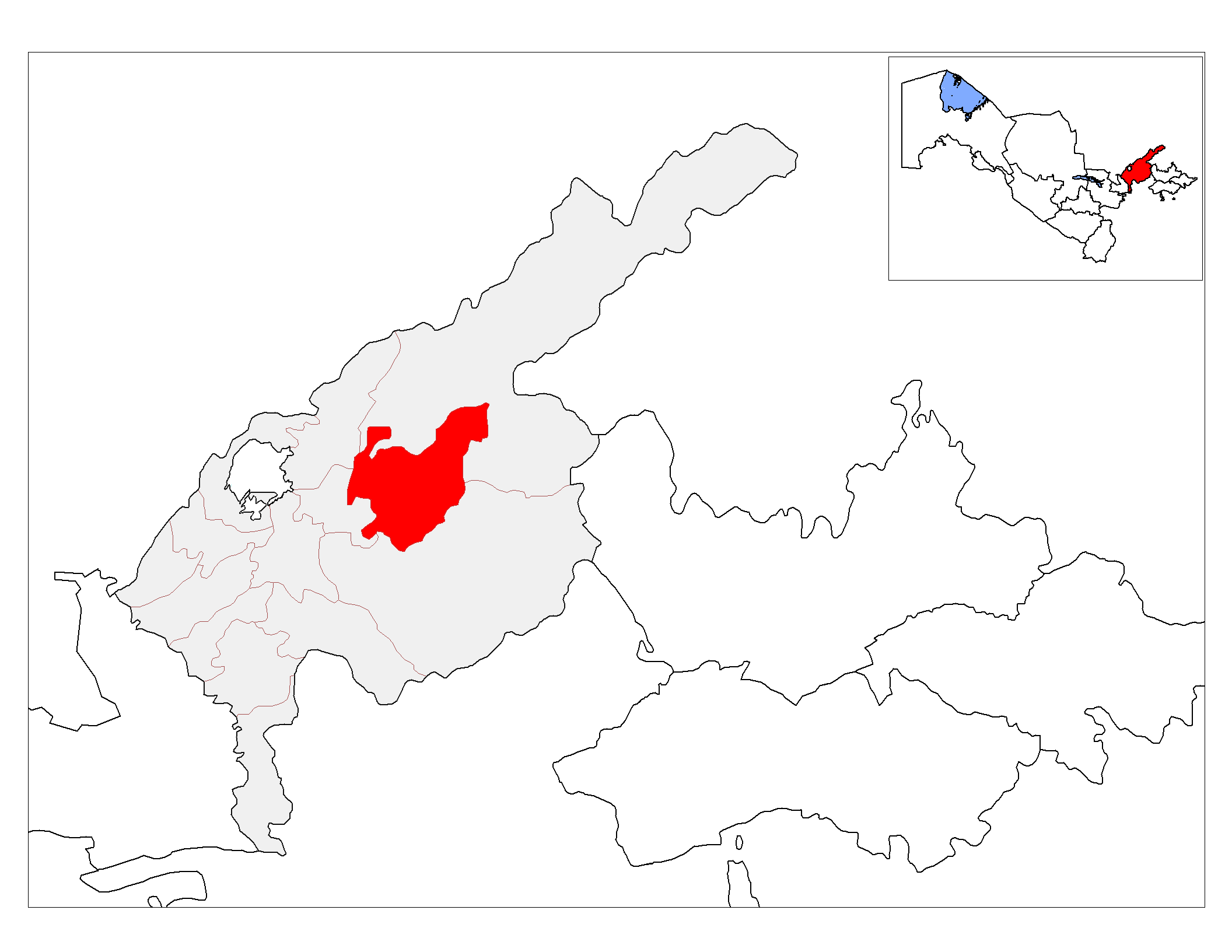
- Country: Uzbekistan
- Region: Tashkent Region
- Capital: Parkent
- Established: 1926

Area
  - Total: 1,080 km^{2} (420 sq mi)

Population (2021)
  - Total: 157,500
  - Density: 146/km^{2} (378/sq mi)
- Time zone: UTC+5 (UZT)

Parkent is a district of Tashkent Region in Uzbekistan. The capital lies at the city Parkent. It has an area of 1,080 km^{2} (420 sq mi) and it had 157,500 inhabitants in 2021. The district consists of one city (Parkent), 3 urban-type settlements (Quyosh, Qoʻrgʻontepa, Chinorli) and 9 rural communities (Zarkent, Qoraqalpoq, Boʻston Chotqol 37-maktab , Nomdanak, Parkent, Soʻqoq, Xisarak, Boshqizilsoy, Changi).
