= Jarqoʻrgʻon District =

Coordinates: 37.5000°N 67.4167°E

Jarqoʻrgʻon Jarqoʻrgʻon tumani
- District
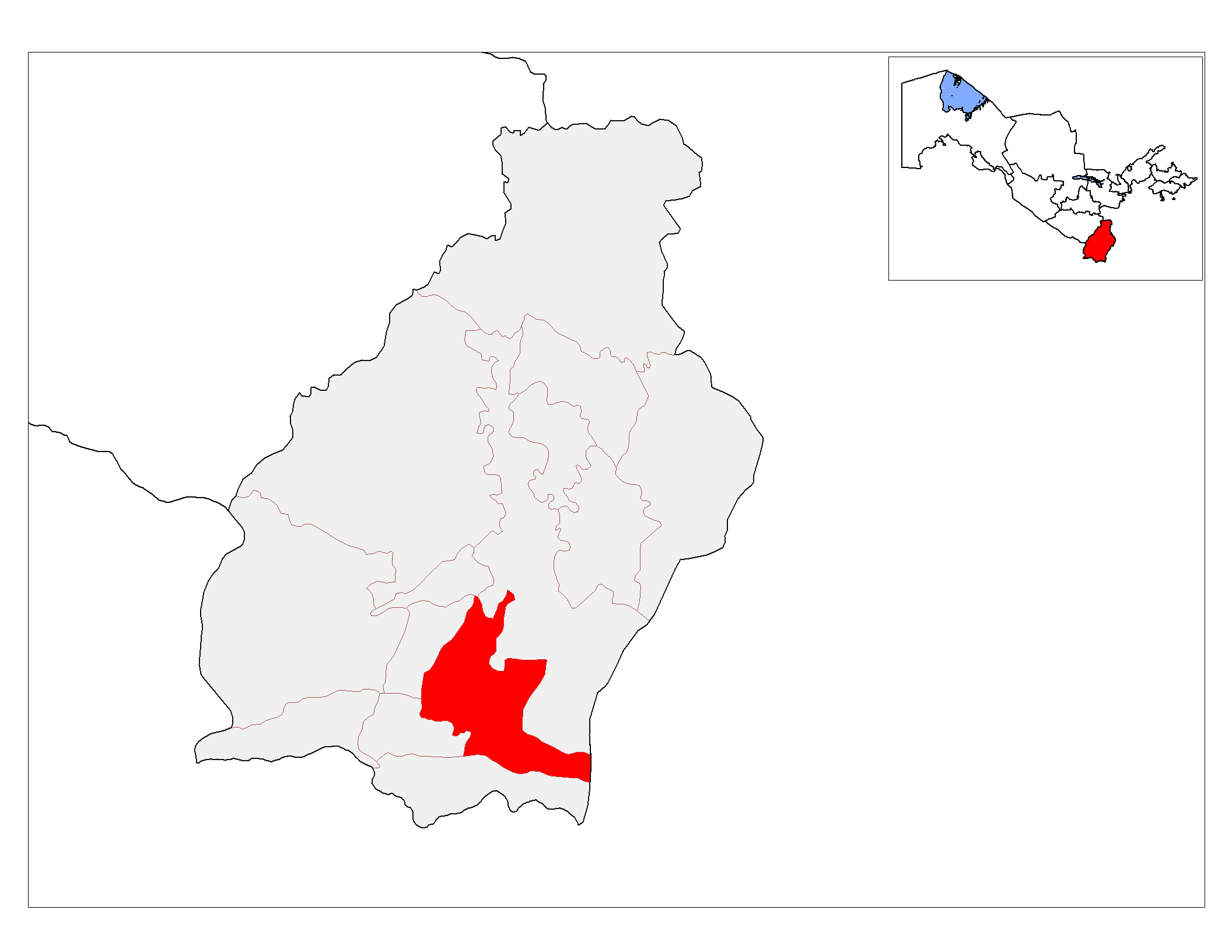
- Country: Uzbekistan
- Region: Surxondaryo Region
- Capital: Jarqoʻrgʻon
- Established: 1926

Area
  - Total: 1,140 km^{2} (440 sq mi)

Population (2021)
  - Total: 222,100
  - Density: 195/km^{2} (505/sq mi)
- Time zone: UTC+5 (UZT)

Jarqoʻrgʻon is a district of Surxondaryo Region in Uzbekistan. The capital lies at the city Jarqoʻrgʻon. It has an area of 1,140 km^{2} (440 sq mi) and its population is 222,100 (2021 est.). The district consists of one city (Jarqoʻrgʻon), 5 urban-type settlements (Kakaydi, Minor, Qoraqursoq, Markaziy Surxon, Kafrun) and 7 rural communities (Oqqoʻrgʻon, Jarqoʻrgʻon, Dehqonobod, Minor, Surxon, Chorjoʻy, Sharq Yulduzi).

The 12th century Jarkurgan minaret is located in the village Minor.
