= Muzrabot District =

Coordinates: 37.6000°N 68.6500°E

Muzrabot
- District
- Muzrabot tumani
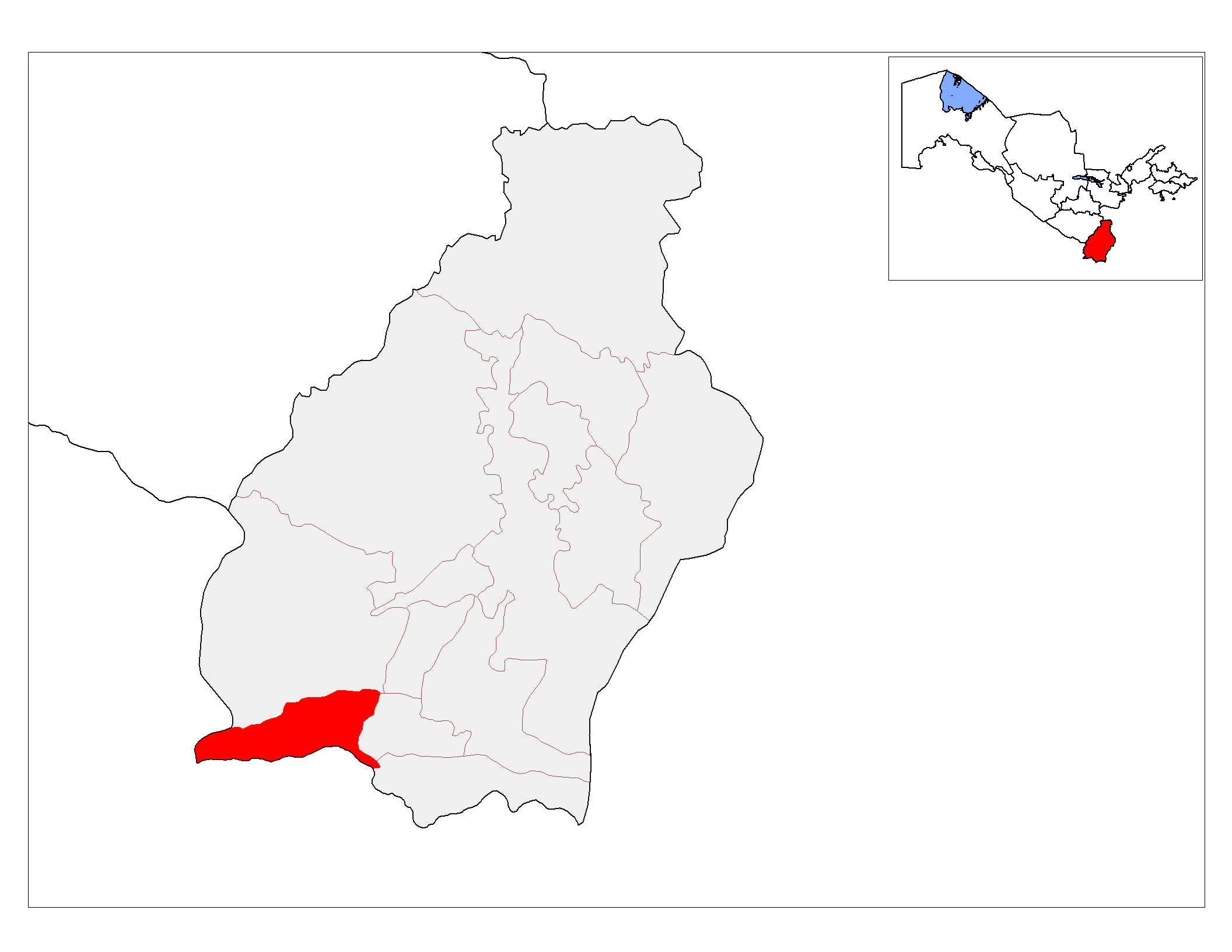
- Country: Uzbekistan
- Region: Surxondaryo Region
- Capital: Xalqobod
- Established: 1968

Area
  - Total: 740 km^{2} (290 sq mi)

Population (2021)
  - Total: 144,200
  - Density: 190/km^{2} (500/sq mi)
- Time zone: UTC+5 (UZT)

Muzrabot is a district of Surxondaryo Region in Uzbekistan. The capital lies at Xalqobod. It has an area of 740 km^{2} (290 sq mi) and its population is 144,200 (2021 est.).

The district consists of 10 urban-type settlements (Xalqobod, Baxt, Baynalmilal, Guliston, Iftixor, Qozoyoqli, Oq oltin, Taskent, Ozod Vatan, Chegarachi) and 9 rural communities (Beshqoʻton, Boldir, Sarhad, Qorakamar, Sharq yulduzi, Muzrabot, tumani Navbahor, Obodon, Shoʻrob).
