= Jarkurgan minaret =

Coordinates: 37.4766°N 67.3962°E

The minaret of Jarkurgan (Uzbek: Jarqoʻrgʻon minorasi / Жарқўрғон минораси) is a minaret and architectural monument in the village Minor, Jarqoʻrgʻon District, southern Uzbekistan. It was built by Muhammad bin Ali Al-Sarkhasi in 1108-1109 AD, its current height is 21.6 meters and its diameter is 5.4 meters, its original height was 40 meters. It is located in a small village near Termez and is one of the most interesting forms of architecture, characterized by corrugated walls made of brick.

== Architectural design ==
The minaret features herringbone brickwork and Kufic inscriptions from the Quran.

== Historical significance ==
It was built during the rule of Sultan Sanjar.

== Location ==
It is situated near Termez, about 7 kilometers from Jarkurgan.

== Current state ==
The minaret is partially preserved, with the mosque that once stood next to it no longer existing.

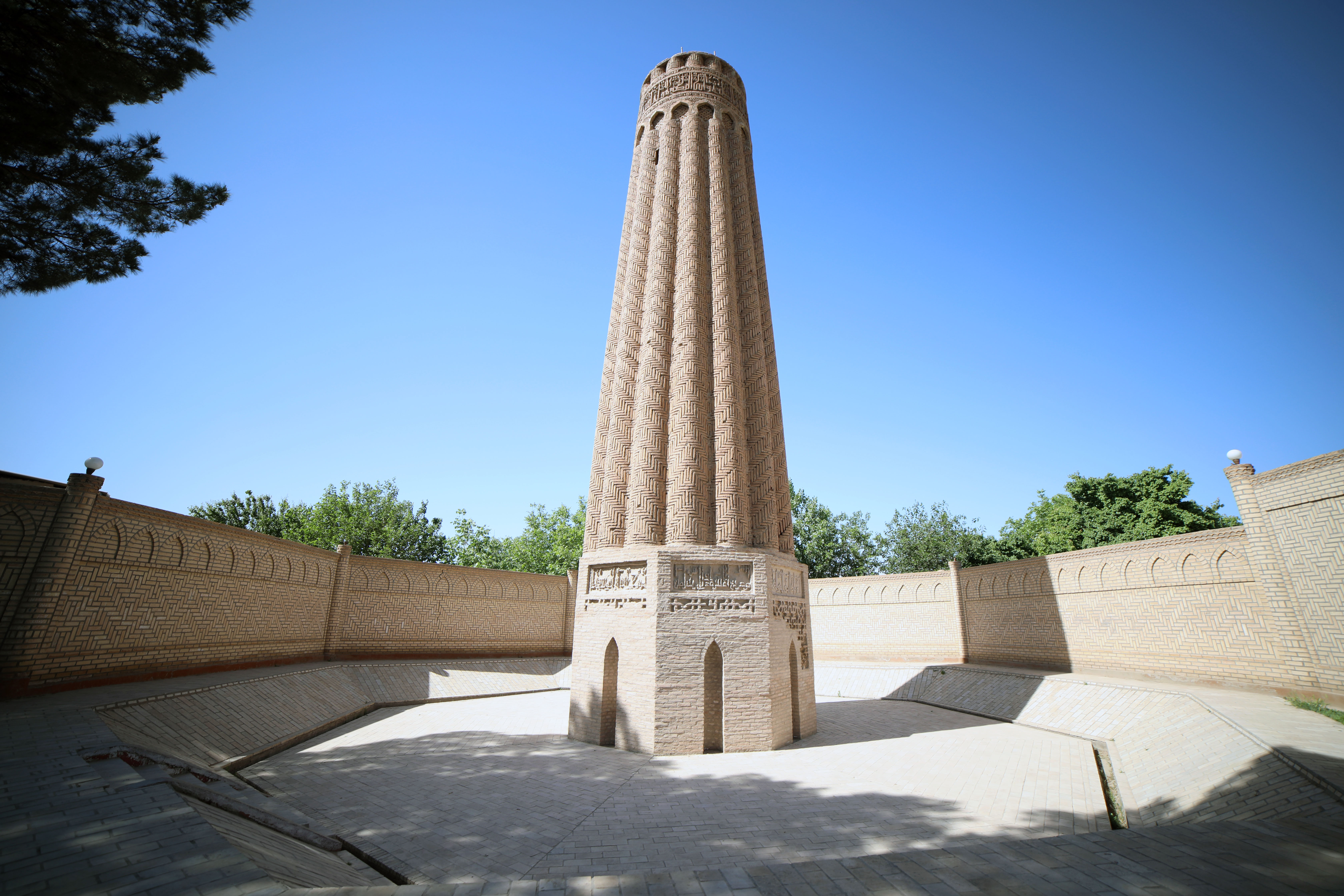
Jarkurgan minaret in Minor

Next to it was a mosque, which has not been preserved. At a height of 20 m, there are brick arches, on which there are Kufic inscriptions.
