= Qiziriq District =

Coordinates: 37.6072°N 67.2862°E

Qiziriq
- District
- Qiziriq tumani
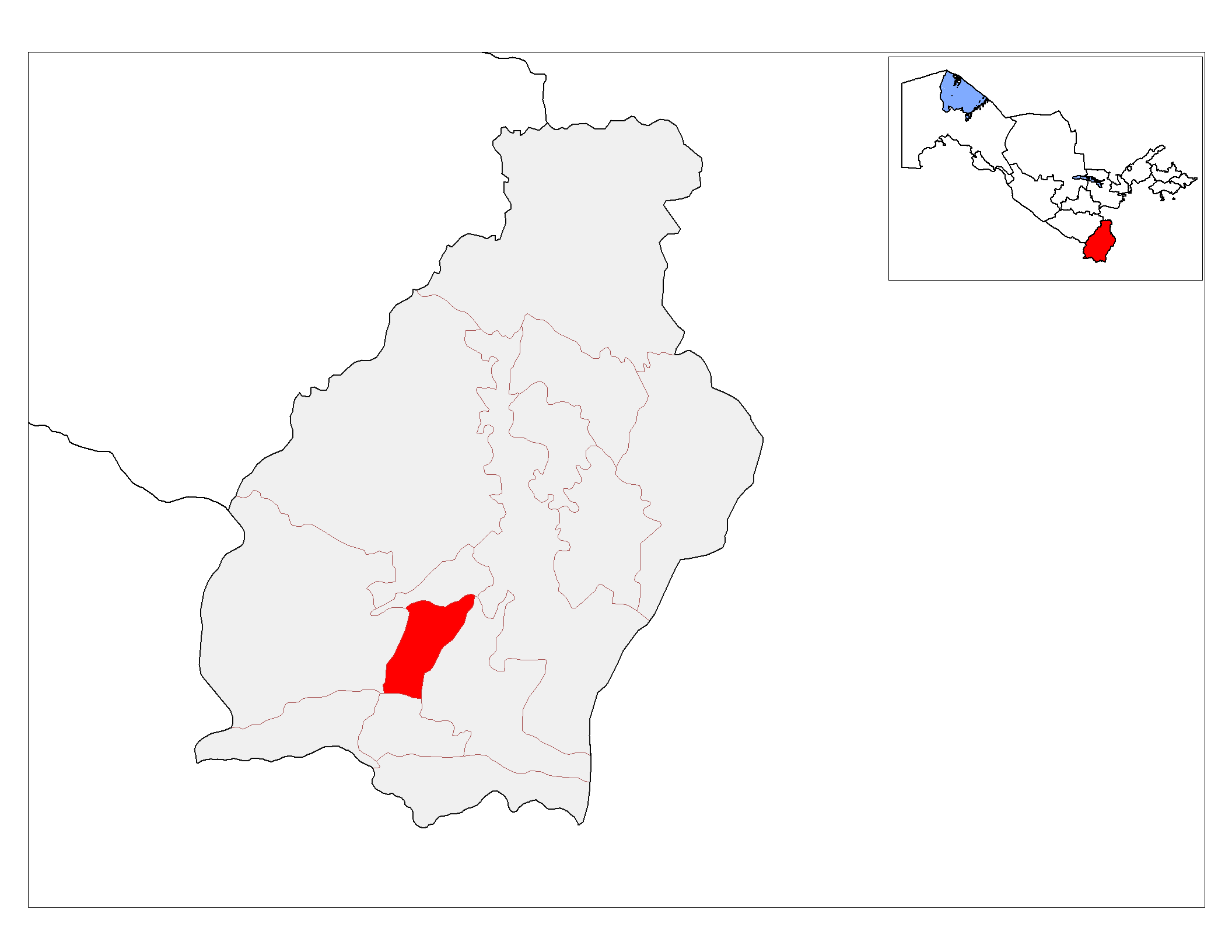
- Country: Uzbekistan
- Region: Surxondaryo Region
- Capital: Sariq
- Established: 1975

Area
  - Total: 345 km^{2} (133 sq mi)

Population (2021)
  - Total: 116,300
  - Density: 337/km^{2} (873/sq mi)
- Time zone: UTC+5 (UZT)

Qiziriq is a district of Surxondaryo Region in Uzbekistan. The capital lies at the town Sariq. It has an area of 345 km^{2} (133 sq mi) and its population is 116,300 (2021 est.). In 2019 it lost part (205 km^{2} (79 sq mi)) of its territory to the re-established Bandixon District.

The district consists of 5 urban-type settlements (Sariq, Kunchiqish, Yangi hayot, Karmaki, Istara) and 10 rural communities (Zarkamar, Olmazor, Bandixon, Qiziriq, Kirshak, Chorvador, Paxtakor, Sharq Istara, Yangi yoʻl, Mehnatobod).
