= Sherobod District =

Coordinates: 37.6833°N 67.0500°E

Sherobod
- District
- Sherobod tumani
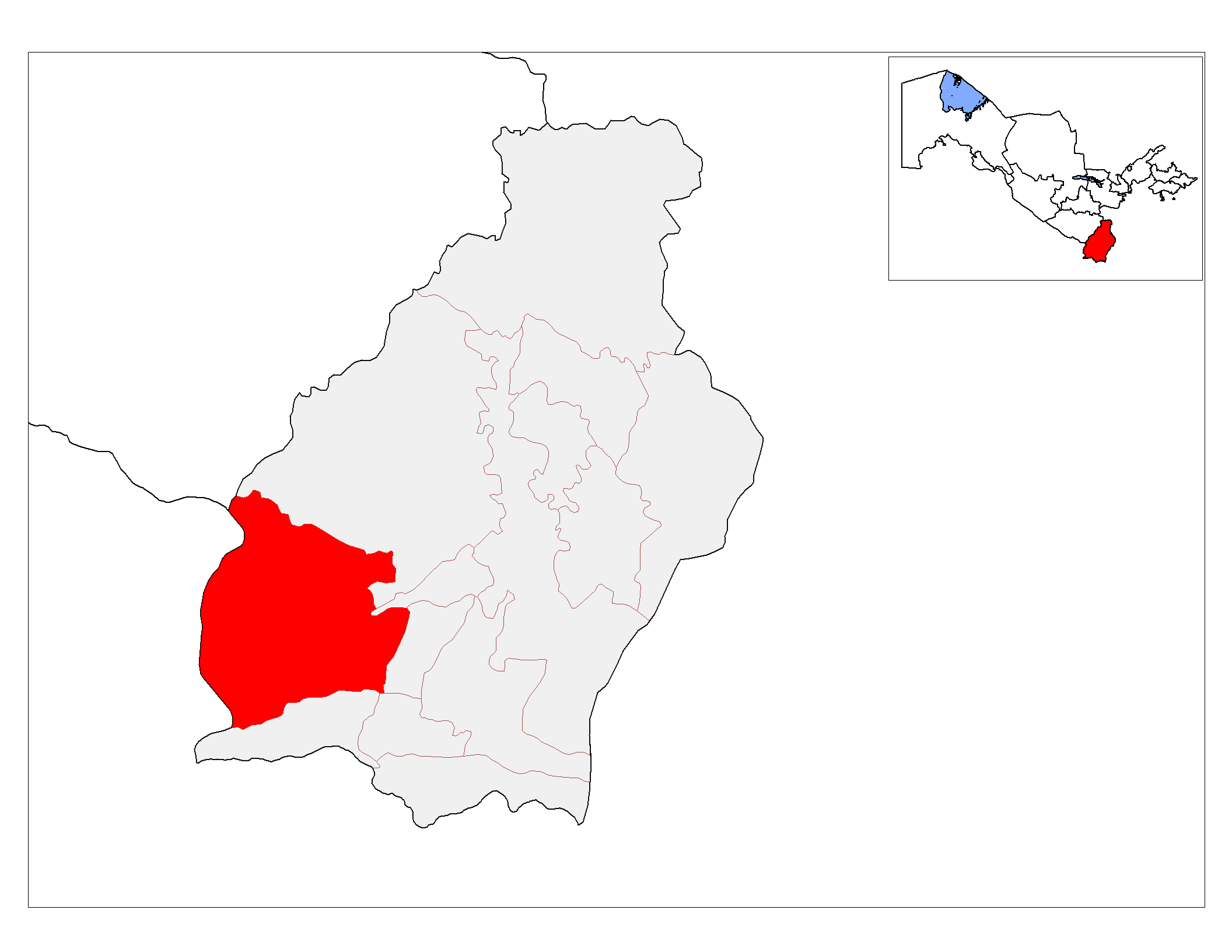
- Country: Uzbekistan
- Region: Surxondaryo Region
- Capital: Sherobod
- Established: 1926

Area
  - Total: 2,730 km^{2} (1,050 sq mi)

Population (2021)
  - Total: 197,300
  - Density: 72.3/km^{2} (187/sq mi)
- Time zone: UTC+5 (UZT)

Sherobod is a district of Surxondaryo Region in Uzbekistan. The capital lies at the city Sherobod. It has an area of 2,730 km^{2} (1,050 sq mi) and its population is 197,300 (2021 est.). The district consists of one city (Sherobod), 7 urban-type settlements (Zarabogʻ, Kilkon, Navbogʻ, Paxtaobod, Sariqamish, Choʻyinchi, Yangiariq) and 9 rural communities. It was established on September 29, 1926.
