= Uzun District =

Coordinates: 38.3192°N 67.9409°E

Uzun
- District
- Uzun tumani
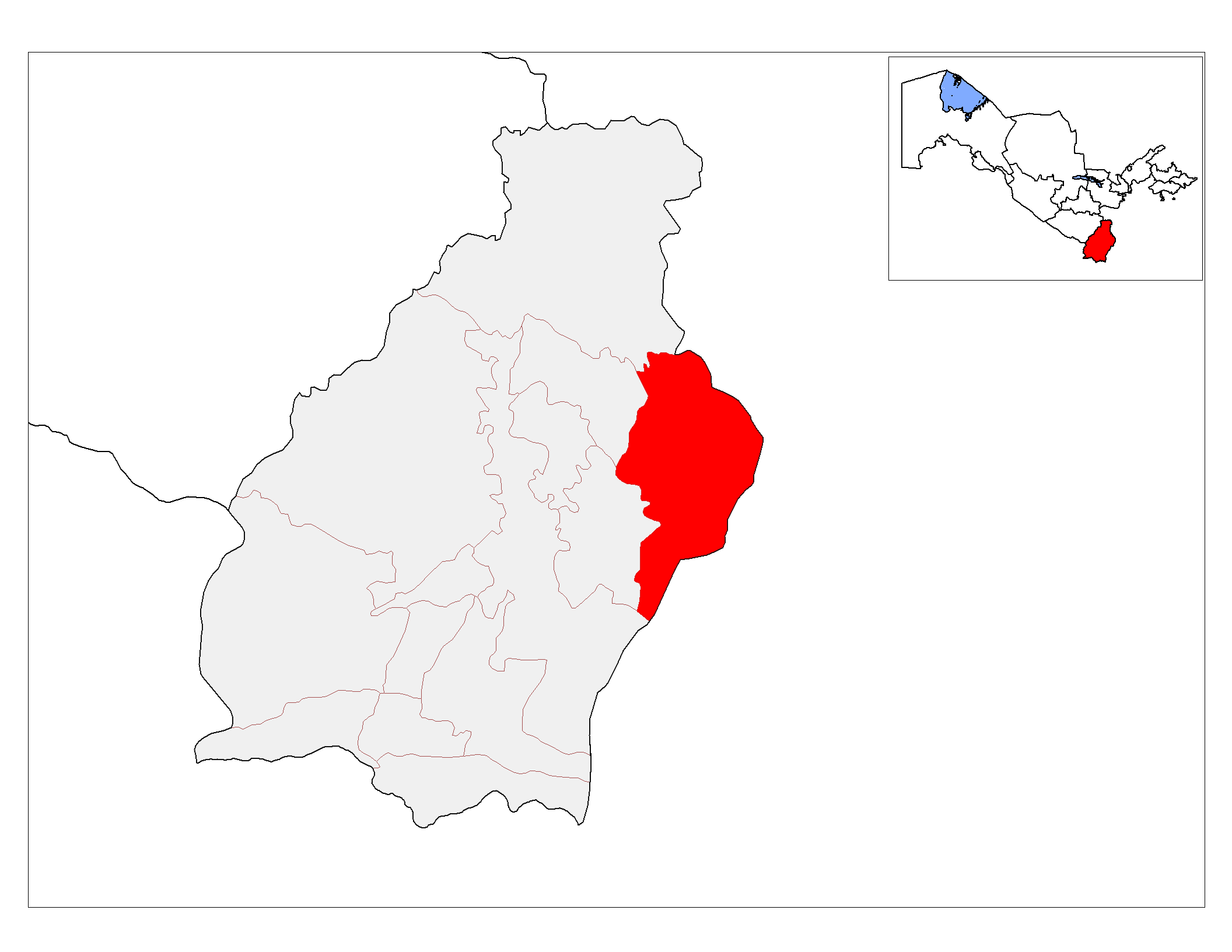
- Country: Uzbekistan
- Region: Surxondaryo Region
- Capital: Uzun
- Established: 1942

Area
  - Total: 1,630 km^{2} (630 sq mi)

Population (2021)
  - Total: 173,900
  - Density: 107/km^{2} (276/sq mi)
- Time zone: UTC+5 (UZT)

Uzun is a district of Surxondaryo Region in Uzbekistan. The capital lies at the town Uzun. It has an area of 1,630 km^{2} (630 sq mi) and its population is 173,900 (2021 est.). The district consists of nine urban-type settlements (Uzun, Chinor, Ulanqul, Qarashiq, Yangi kuch, Jonchekka, Malandiyon, Mehnat, Yangi roʻzgʻor) and seven rural communities.
