= Bandixon =

- urban-type settlement
- Location in Uzbekistan
- Coordinates: 37°51′41″N 67°23′10″E
- Country: Uzbekistan
- Region: Surxondaryo Region
- District: Bandixon District

Population
  - Total: 80,000
- Time zone: UTC+5 (UZT)

Bandixon (Uzbek: Bandixon, Russian: Бандихон) is an urban-type settlement in Bandixon District, Surxondaryo Region, Uzbekistan. It is the administrative center of Bandixon District.
