= Uzun, Uzbekistan =

Urban-type settlement in Surxondaryo Region, Uzbekistan

Uzun
- urban-type settlement
- Location in Uzbekistan
- Coordinates: 38°22′00″N 68°00′20″E
- Country: Uzbekistan
- Region: Surxondaryo Region
- District: Uzun District

Population (2016)
  - Total: 14,600
- Time zone: UTC+5 (UZT)

Uzun (Uzbek: Uzun/Узун, Russian: Узун) is an urban-type settlement in Surxondaryo Region, Uzbekistan. It is the administrative center of Uzun District. Its population was 11,620 people in 1989, and 14,600 in 2016.
