= Angor District =

Coordinates: 37.4500°N 67.1500°E

Angor
- District
- Angor tumani
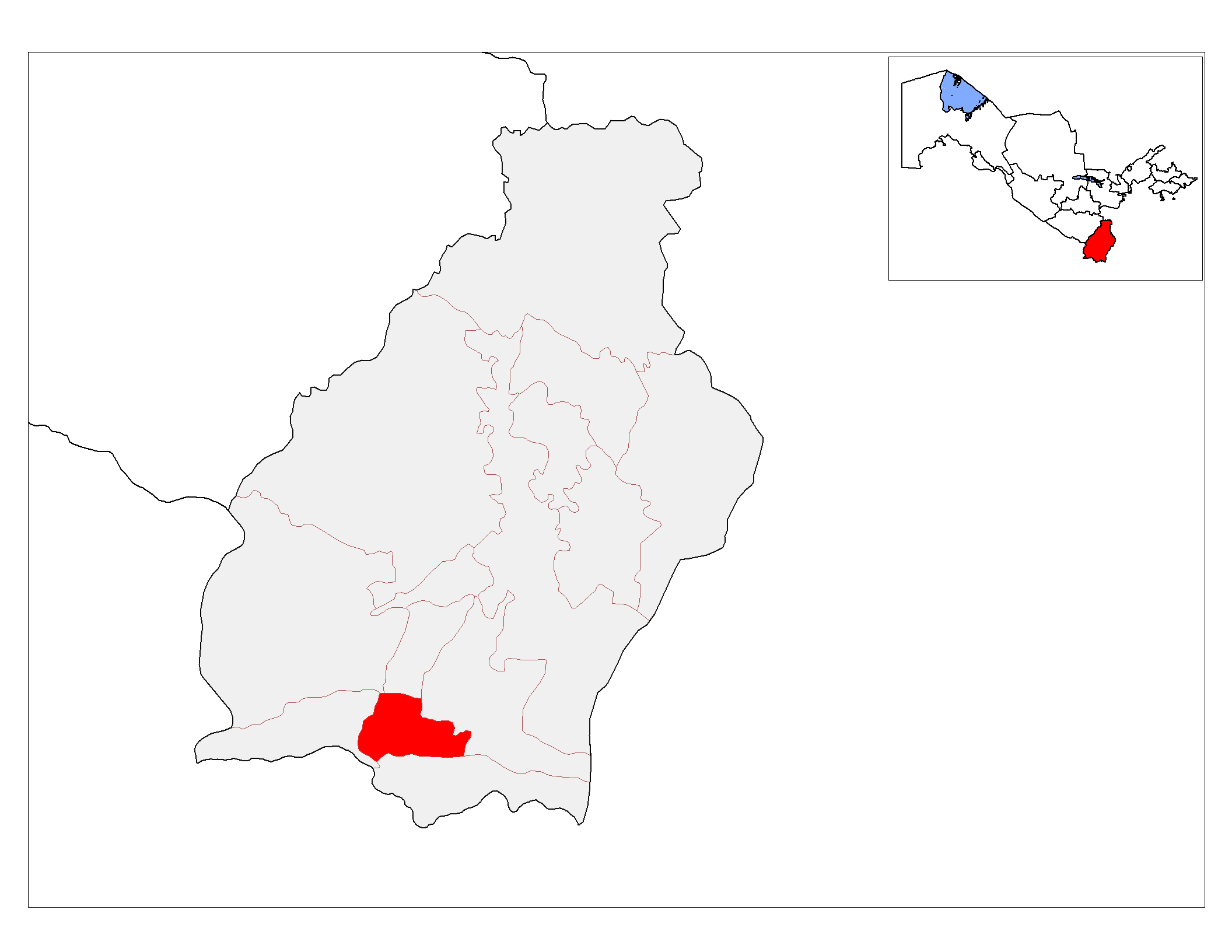
- Country: Uzbekistan
- Region: Surxondaryo Region
- Capital: Angor
- Established: 1952

Government
  - Type: hokimyat

Area
  - Total: 390 km^{2} (150 sq mi)

Population (2021)
  - Total: 134,700
  - Density: 350/km^{2} (890/sq mi)
- Time zone: UTC+5 (UZT)

Angor is a district of Surxondaryo Region in Uzbekistan. The capital lies at the town Angor. It has an area of 390 km^{2} (150 sq mi) and ts population is 134,700 (2021 est.).

The district consists of 12 urban-type settlements (Angor, Tallimaron, Xomkon, Qorasuv, Yangiobod, Talloshqon, Gilambob, Zartepa, Yangi turmush, Angor (yangi), Kayran, Novshahar) and 7 rural communities.
