= Surxondaryo Region =

Region of Uzbekistan

Surkhondaryo Region Surxondaryo viloyati Сурхондарё вилояти
- Region
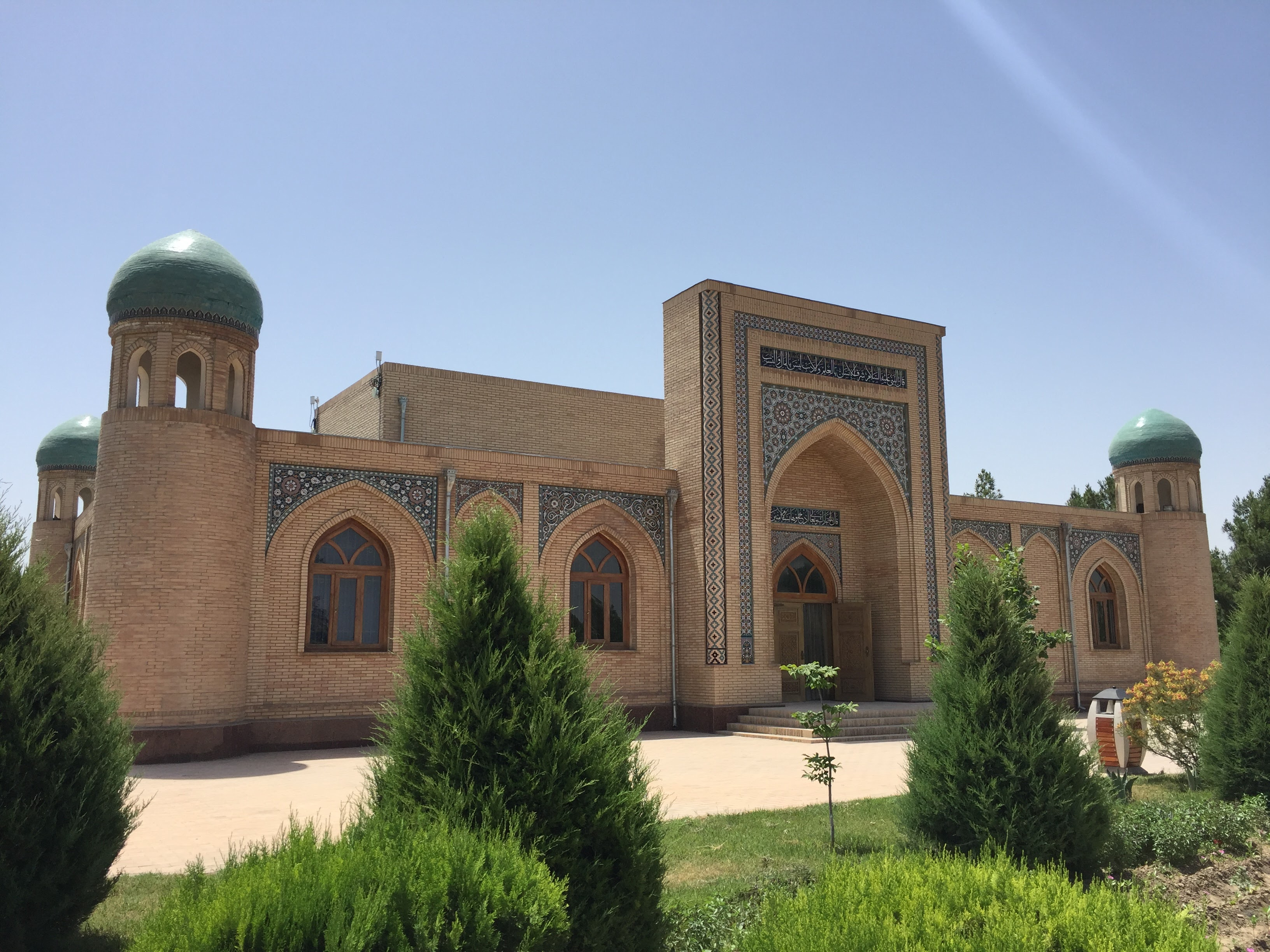
- Mausoleum of Hakim al-Termezi in Termez

- Surxondaryo in Uzbekistan
- Coordinates: 38°0′N 67°30′E
- Country: Uzbekistan
- Capital: Termez

Government
  - Hokim: Ulug‘bek Qosimov

Area
  - Total: 20,099 km^{2} (7,760 sq mi)
- Elevation: 535 m (1,755 ft)

Population (2021)
  - Total: 2,680,800
  - Density: 133.38/km^{2} (345.45/sq mi)
- Time zone: UTC+5 (East)
- ISO 3166 code: UZ-SU
- Districts: 14
- Cities: 8
- Townships: 7
- Villages: 114
- Website: www.surxondaryo.uz

Surxondaryo Region (Note: Uzbek: Сурхондарё вилояти, romanized: Surxondaryo viloyati, IPA: [sʊrˌχɔndærˈjɔ ʋɪ̆lɔˌjæˈtʰɪ̆]; Tajik: вилояти Сурхондарё, romanized: viloyati Surxondaryo, IPA: [ʋɪlɔjɐˈtʰɪ sʊrˌχɔndɐrˈjɔ]; Karakalpak: Сурхандәря уәлаяты, romanized: Surxandárya wálayatı) (Note: Formerly called Surkhandarya Oblast (translated from Russian Сурхандарьинская область).) is a region (viloyat) of Uzbekistan, located in the extreme south-east of the country. Established on 6 March 1941, it borders on Qashqadaryo Region internally, and Turkmenistan, Afghanistan and Tajikistan externally, going anticlockwise from the north. It takes its name from the river Surxondaryo, that flows through the region. It covers an area of 20,100 km². The population is estimated at 2,743,201 (beginning of 2022 data), with 80% living in rural areas. According to official data, 83% of the population are Uzbeks and 12.5% Tajiks. The highest point of the Region and also of Uzbekistan is Khazrati Sulton peak reaching 4,643 m/15,233 ft in Gissar Range.

The regional capital is Termez with a population of about 200,000 (2024), and the second largest city is Denov (Denau) with 78,300 inhabitants (data for 2016). Other towns include Boysun, Jarqoʻrgʻon, Qumqoʻrgʻon, Shargʻun, Sherobod, Shoʻrchi, and Sariosiyo.

The climate is continental, with mild wet winters and hot dry summers. The southern part of the region is in the Badkhiz-Karabil semi-desert ecoregion (PA0808), characterized by a savanna of pistachio and desert sedge. The northern portion is characterized by open woodlands (Gissaro-Alai open woodlands ecoregion, PA1306), with characteristic plants being pistachio, almond, walnut, apple, and juniper. Sagebrush is common at lower elevations

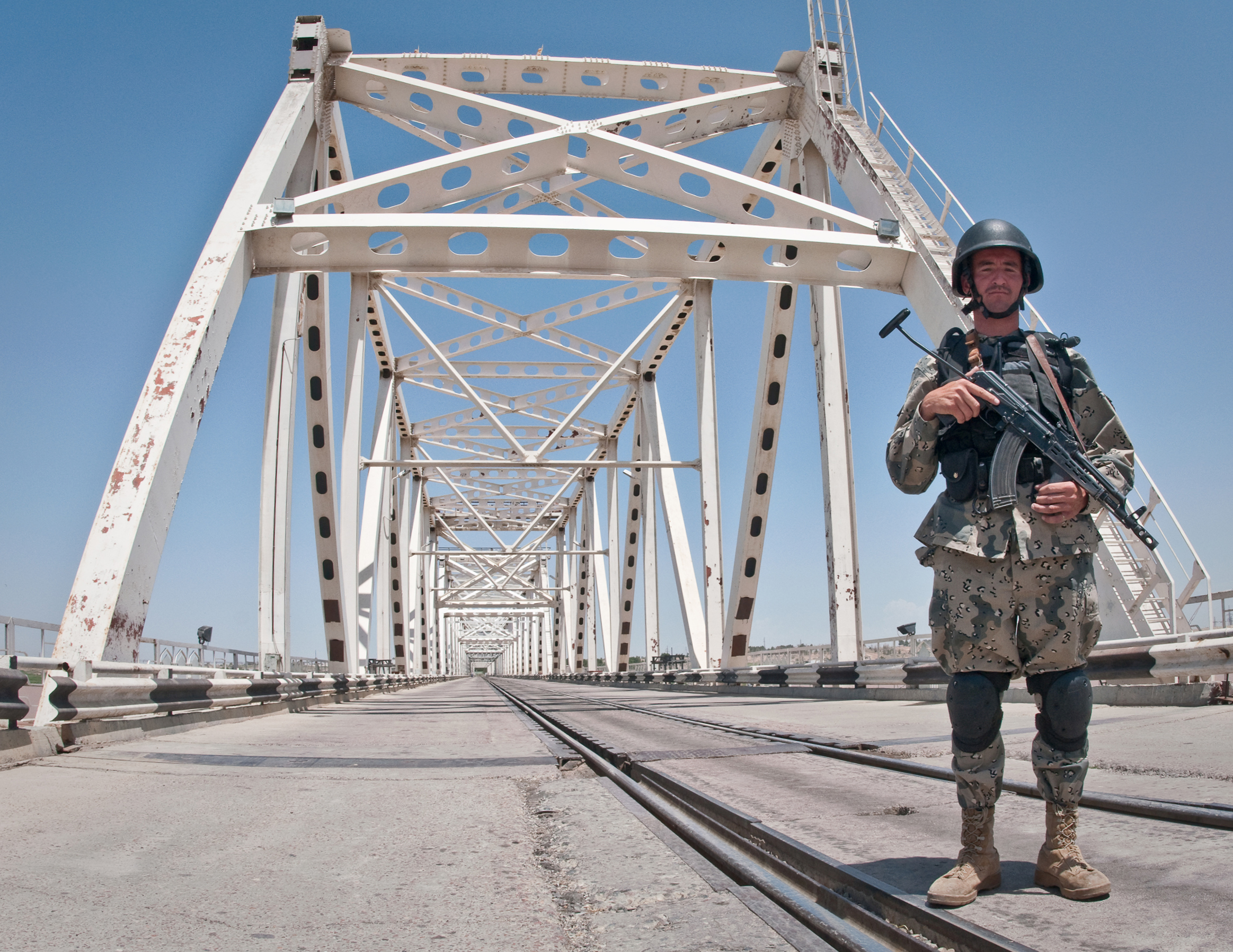
Uzbekistan-Afghanistan Friendship Bridge

Natural resources include petroleum, natural gas, and coal. Light industry, mainly cotton ginning and food processing, is also an important part of the regional economy, particularly in the production of consumer goods. Agriculture is based primarily on cotton and cereals, supplemented with horticulture and viticulture. Surxondaryo is the country's largest supplier of long-fiber cotton. Livestock accounts for 40% of regional agricultural product. The climatic conditions of this region also make it possible to cultivate subtropical crops such as sugarcane.

The region has a well-developed transport infrastructure, with 300 km of railways and 2,700 km of surfaced roads. Central Asia's only river port is located at Termez on the Amudarya River.

== History ==
Bitter debates accompanied the Soviet allocation of Surkhandarya Region to the Uzbek SSR rather than the Tajik SSR in 1929, as that region, as well as the areas of Bukhara and Samarkand, had sizable, if not dominant, Tajik populations.

== Districts ==
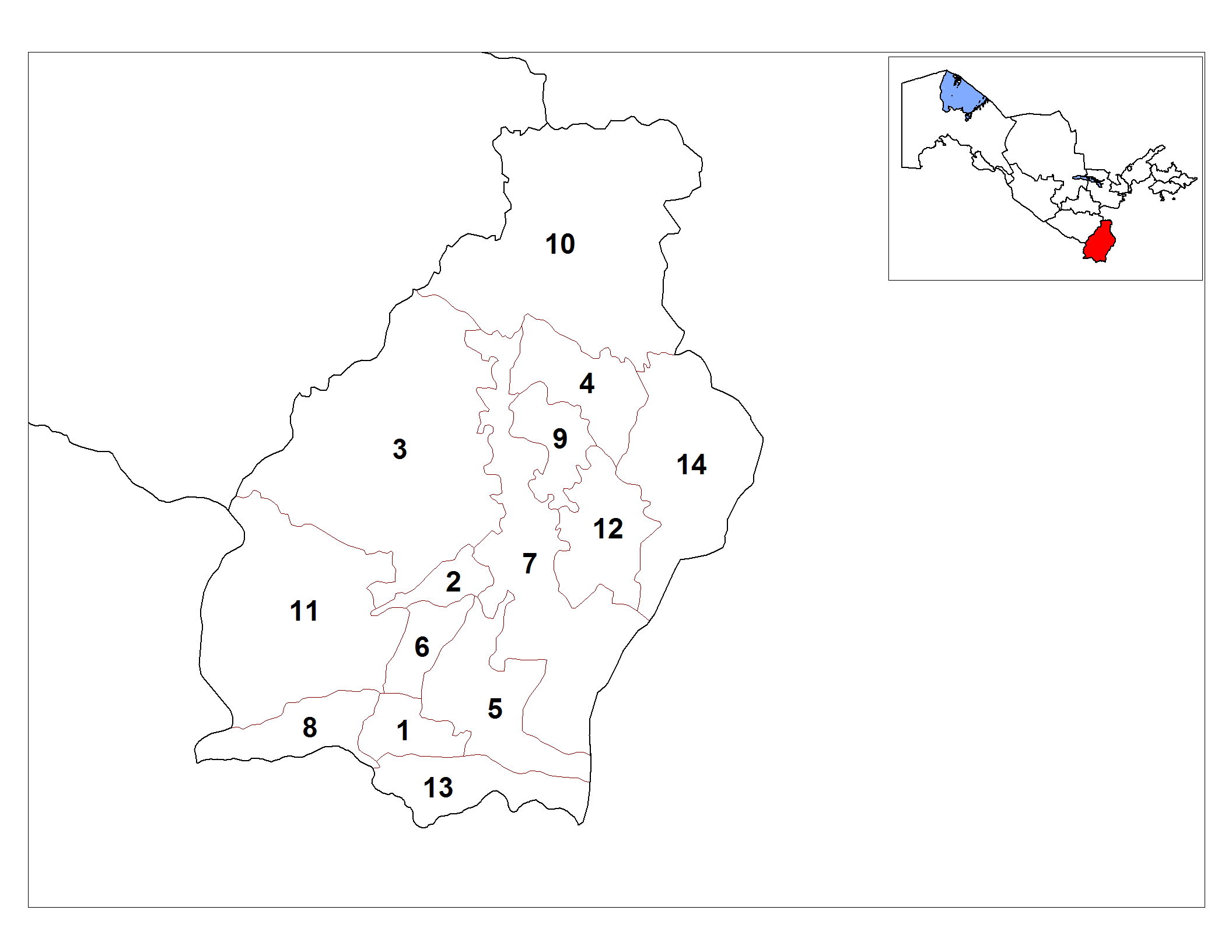
Districts of Surxondaryo Region

The Surxondaryo Region consists of 14 districts (listed below) and one district-level city: Termez.

| | District name | District capital |
|---|---|---|
| 1 | Angor District | Angor |
| 2 | Bandixon District | Bandixon |
| 3 | Boysun District | Boysun |
| 4 | Denov District | Denov (Denau) |
| 5 | Jarqoʻrgʻon District | Jarqoʻrgʻon |
| 6 | Qiziriq District | Sariq |
| 7 | Qumqoʻrgʻon District | Qumqoʻrgʻon |
| 8 | Muzrabot District | Xalqobod (Khalkabad) |
| 9 | Oltinsoy District | Qarluq |
| 10 | Sariosiyo District | Sariosiyo |
| 11 | Sherobod District | Sherobod |
| 12 | Shoʻrchi District | Shoʻrchi |
| 13 | Termiz District | Uchqizil |
| 14 | Uzun District | Uzun |

There are 8 cities (Termez, Boysun, Denov, Jarqoʻrgʻon, Qumqoʻrgʻon, Shargʻun, Sherobod, Shoʻrchi) and 112 urban-type settlements in the Surxondaryo Region.

== Agriculture (2005 data) ==
Agriculture accounts for 42% of total employment in Surxondaryo Region and produces 8% of Uzbekistan’s agricultural output. Agricultural production is 56% crops and 44% livestock (like the country’s average). Milk yields are less than 1,700 kg per cow per year, on a par with the national average.

Main characteristics of agriculture in Surxondaryo Region

| | Surxondaryo | Percent of national total |
|---|---|---|
| Sown area | 278,100 ha | 8 |
| Cereals | 45% | 8 |
| Cotton | 45% | 8 |
| Potatoes, vegetables | 5% | 7 |
| Feed crops | 5% | 5 |
| Fruit orchards | 12,600 ha | 6 |
| Vineyards | 8,400 ha | 6 |
| Cattle | 531,100 head | 8 |
| Cows | 241,900 head | 9 |
| Sheep, goats | 1,253,500 head | 11 |

== Gallery ==
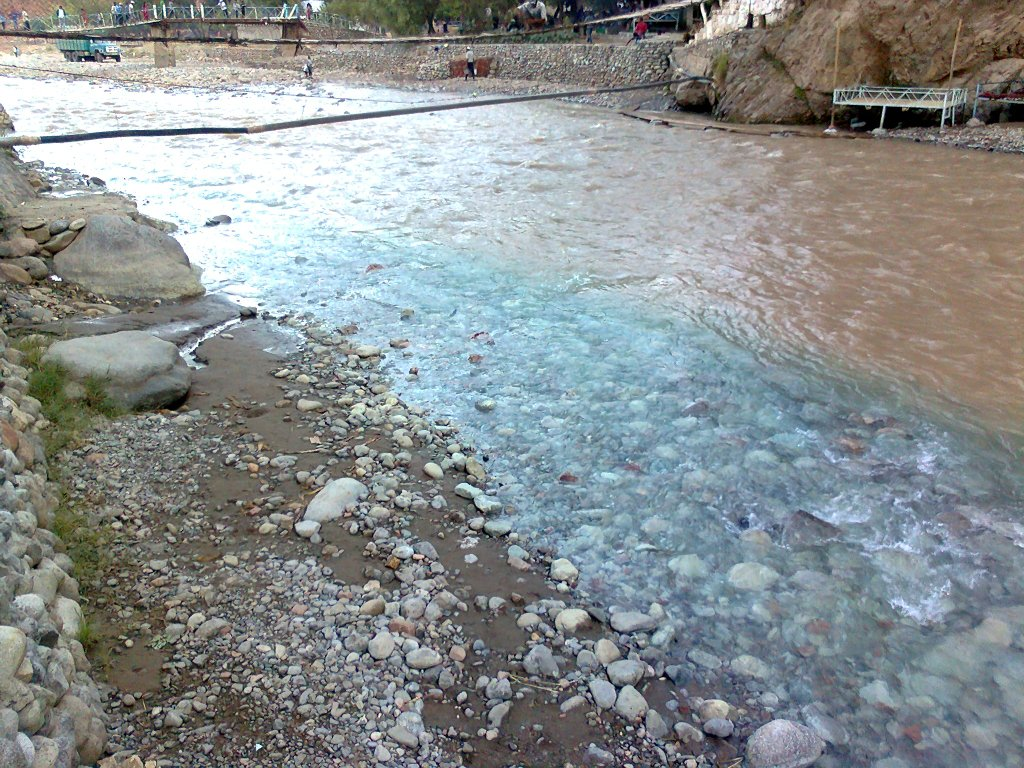
Two different streams flow into one (a healing spring and the river itself in blue)

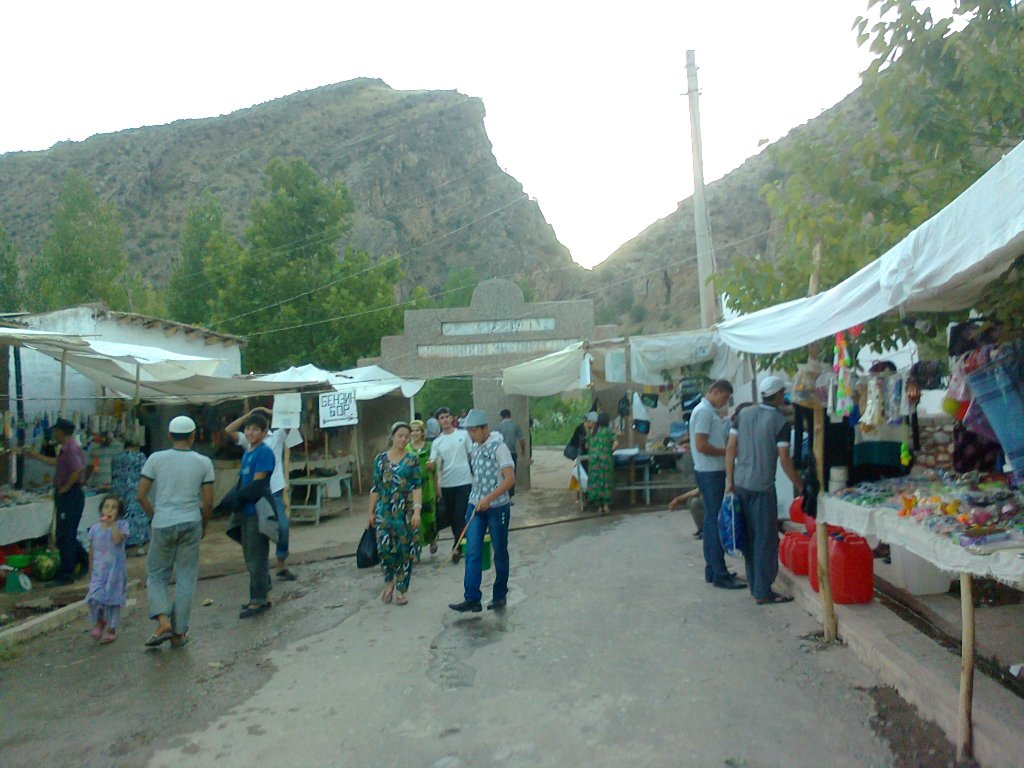
Market at the foot of Khujaypok

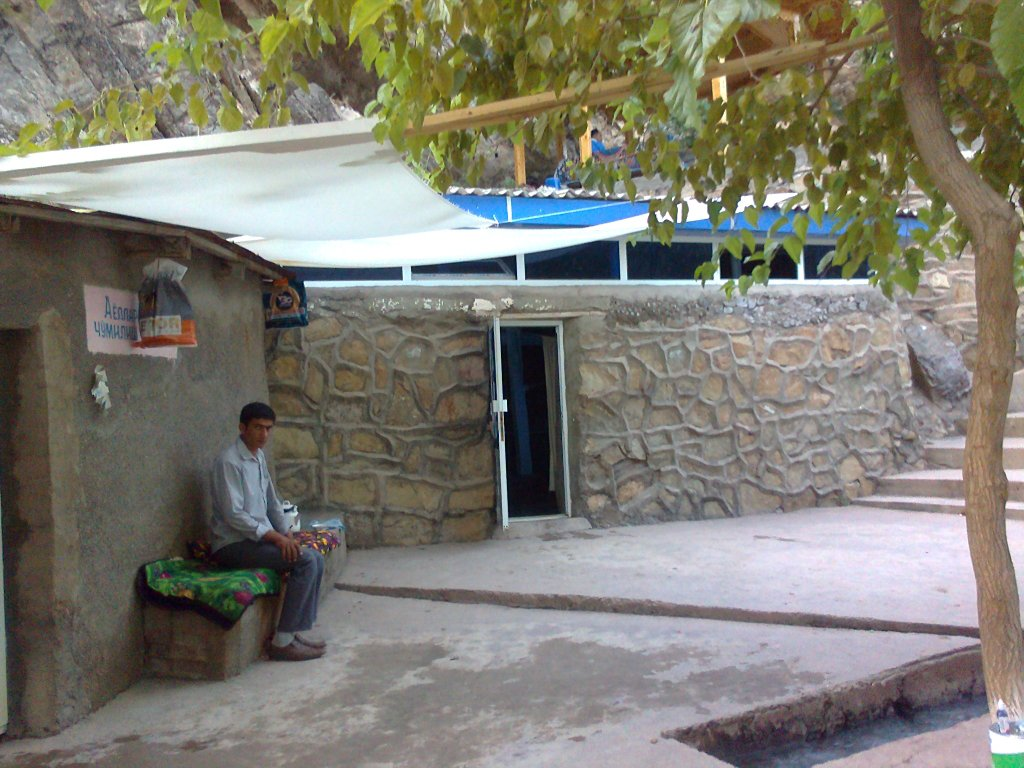
Healing bath from a hydrogen-chloride source. Treats infectious skin diseases and difficult to heal wounds

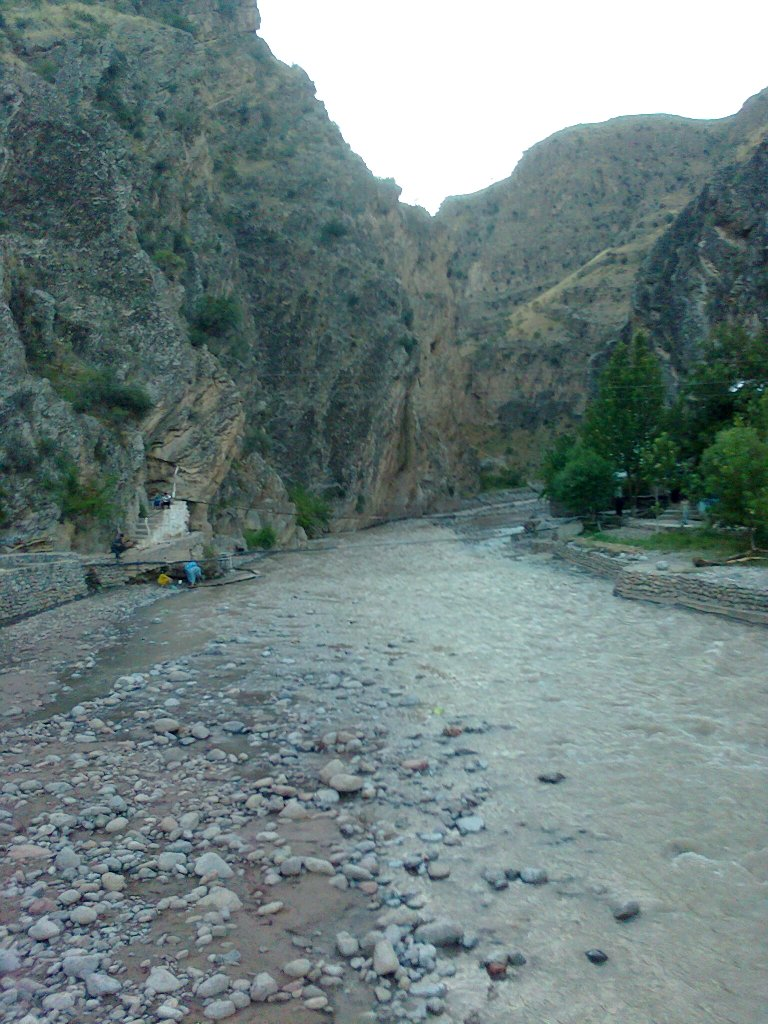
The Khujaypok river
