= Silk Roads: Zarafshan-Karakum Corridor =

UNESCO World Heritage Site
- Interactive map of Silk Roads: Zarafshan-Karakum Corridor
- Location: Tajikistan; Turkmenistan; Uzbekistan
- Includes: 31 locations in 3 countries
- Criteria: Cultural: (ii)(iii)(v)
- Reference: 1675
- Inscription: 2023 (45th Session)
- Area: 669.679 ha (2.58565 sq mi)
- Buffer zone: 1,750.042 ha (6.75695 sq mi)

Silk Roads: Zarafshan-Karakum Corridor is a UNESCO World Heritage Site which covers the Zarafshan-Karakum portion of the ancient Silk Road and historical sites along the route. On September 17, 2023, UNESCO designated a 886 km stretch of the Silk Road network in Central Asia as a World Heritage site. The corridor spans Tajikistan, Turkmenistan and Uzbekistan, and includes 31 sites.

== Location ==
The corridor is located in Central Asia. It crosses seven geographical zones: the highland zone, piedmont zone, plains zone, artificial irrigation zone, oases zone, wormwood-steppe zone and desert zone.

== Sites ==
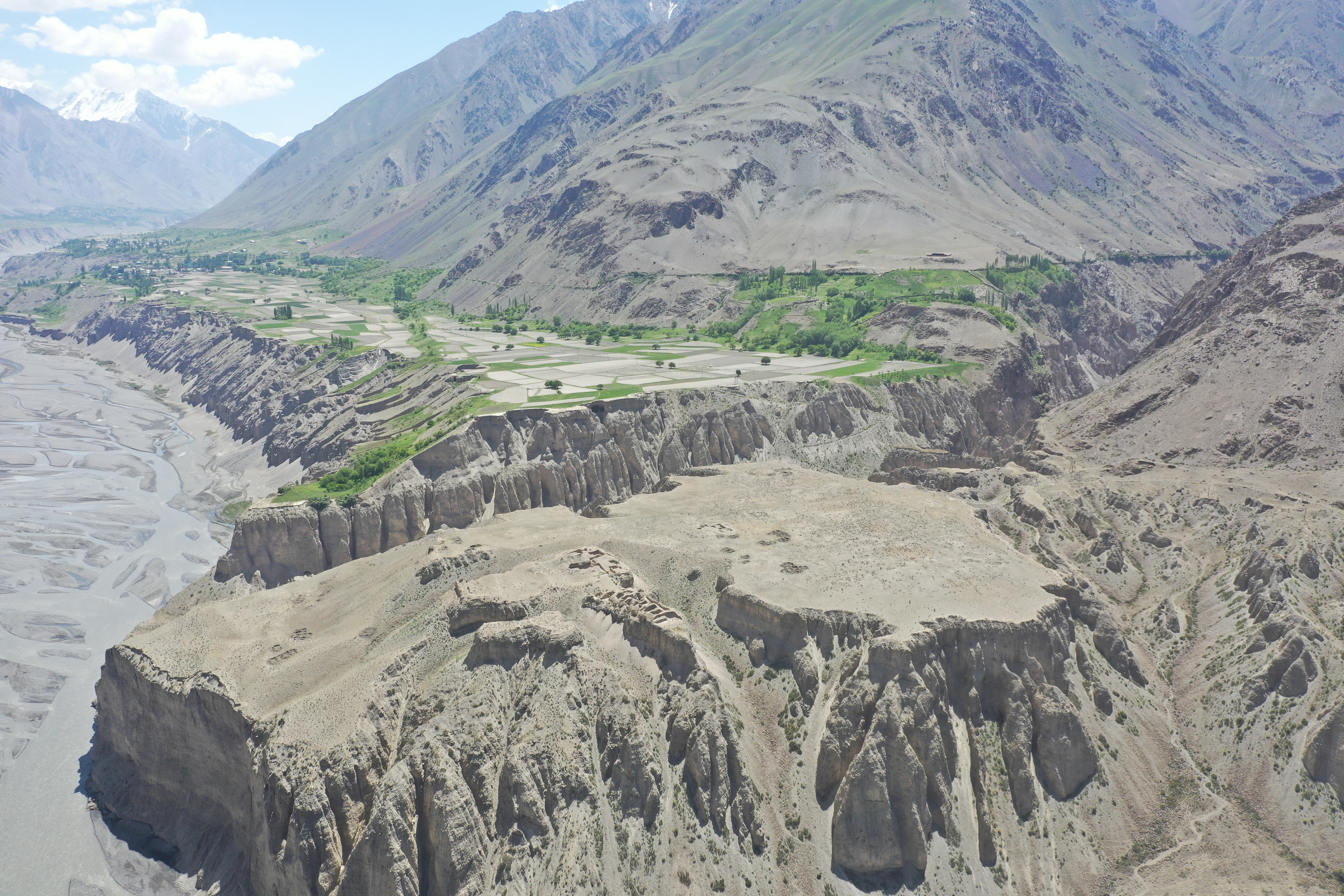
Khisorak

The sites are located in three countries, which are recognized for the World Heritage inscription:

=== Tajikistan ===
- Khisorak Settlement
- Сastle on Mount Mugh
- Kum Settlement
- Gardani Khisor Settlement
- Tali Khamtuda Fortress
- Mausoleum of Khoja Mukhammad Bashoro
- Toksankoriz Irrigation System
- Sanjarshakh Settlement
- Town of Ancient Penjikent

=== Uzbekistan ===
- Jartepa II Temple
- Suleimantepa
- Kafirkala Settlement
- Dabusiya Settlement
- Kasim Sheikh Architectural Complex
- Mir Sayid Bakhrom Mausoleum
- Rabati Malik
  - Rabati Malik Sardoba
- Deggaron Mosque
- Chasma-i Ayub Khazira
- Vardanze Settlement
- Vobkent Minaret
- Bahouddin Naqshband Architectural Complex
- Chor Bakr Necropolis
- Varakhsha Settlement
- Paikend Settlement

=== Turkmenistan ===
- Amul Settlement
- Mansaf Caravanserai (a)
- Mansaf Caravanserai (b)
- Konegala Caravanserai
