= Vobkent =

- City
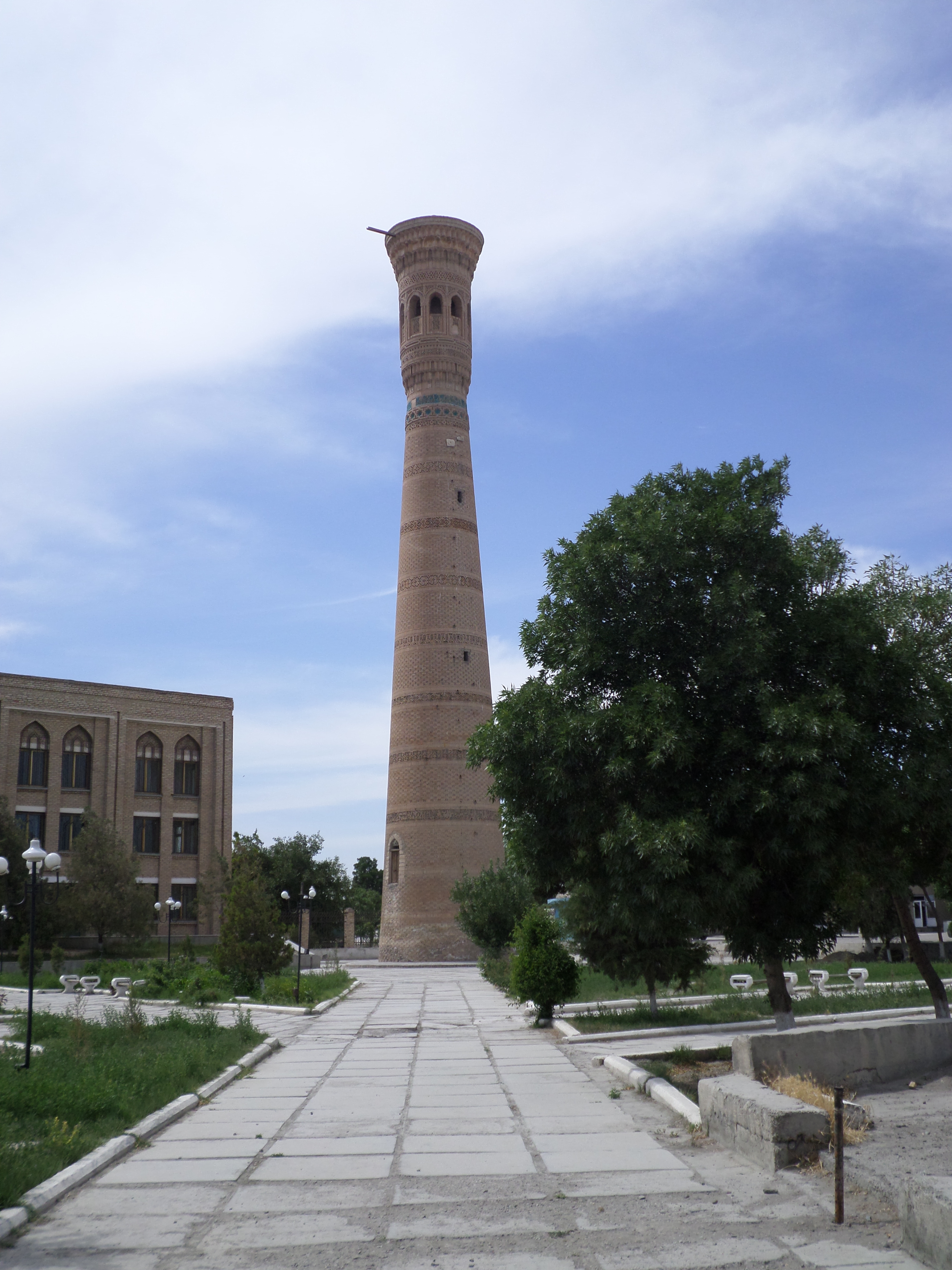
- Vobkent Minaret

- Location in Uzbekistan
- Coordinates: 40°01′05″N 64°31′42″E
- Country: Uzbekistan
- Region: Bukhara Region
- District: Vobkent District
- Elevation: 239 m (784 ft)

Population (2016)
  - Total: 17,800
- Time zone: UTC+05:00 (UZT)

Vobkent (Uzbek: Vobkent / Вобкент; Tajik: Вобкент; Russian: Вабкент) is a city in the Bukhara Region of Uzbekistan and the capital of Vobkent District. It is famous for a minaret constructed in 1196–1198, under the reign of Ala ad-Din Tekish.

Vobkent is situated ca. 28 km from the city of Bukhara. Its population is 17,800 (2016). It has textile industry and poultry.

== History ==
It is believed that Vobkent was founded before the Arab campaigns in Central Asia. It was mentioned by Bukhara historian Abu Bakr Muhammad ibn Jafar Narshakhi in the 10th century. In the documents of XIV century Vobkent is mentioned as Vabkana. Since the XVI century, Vobkent became known under two names - Vabkana and Kamat. In the book of the XVII century historian Mahmud ibn Vali "Bahr ul-Asror" (1634-1641) the name of Vobkent county is Kamat. There is also information about Vorakent in Mirzo Badeh's book "Majmaʼ al-arqom" ("Сборник чисел" ("Collection of Numbers"); 18th century). According to the basic documents of the second half of the 19th century, there were many artisans in the village of Narchoq (Narshah) in the Kamat district (now Vobkent District). There are ancient historical monuments in Vobkent, such as madrasas, public baths, cathedral mosques, Old Vabkand, Vabkand fortress, which have not survived to this day. In Vobkent there is a minaret built in 1196–1198. In the era of Timurids and Shaybanids a mint functioned here.

The prosperity of the city began in the Kara-Khanid era.

== Location ==
Vobkent is located on the highway connecting Bukhara with Samarkand and Tashkent. In the center of Vobkent, a tributary of the Zeravshan River crosses the Vobkent River. The nearest railway station is 28 km from Bukhara. The population is about 16,000, with Uzbeks being the predominant ethnic group. Russians, Tajiks, Tatars, Azerbaijanis, and others also live here. The city has district organizations, a cotton factory, and a handicraft and art workshop. Among the important architectural monuments is the Vobkent Tower.

== See also ==
- Amir Sultan
