= Mausoleum of Mukhammad Bashoro =

Mausoleum in Panjakent, Tajikistan

Coordinates: 39°23′15.3″N 67°51′8.1″E

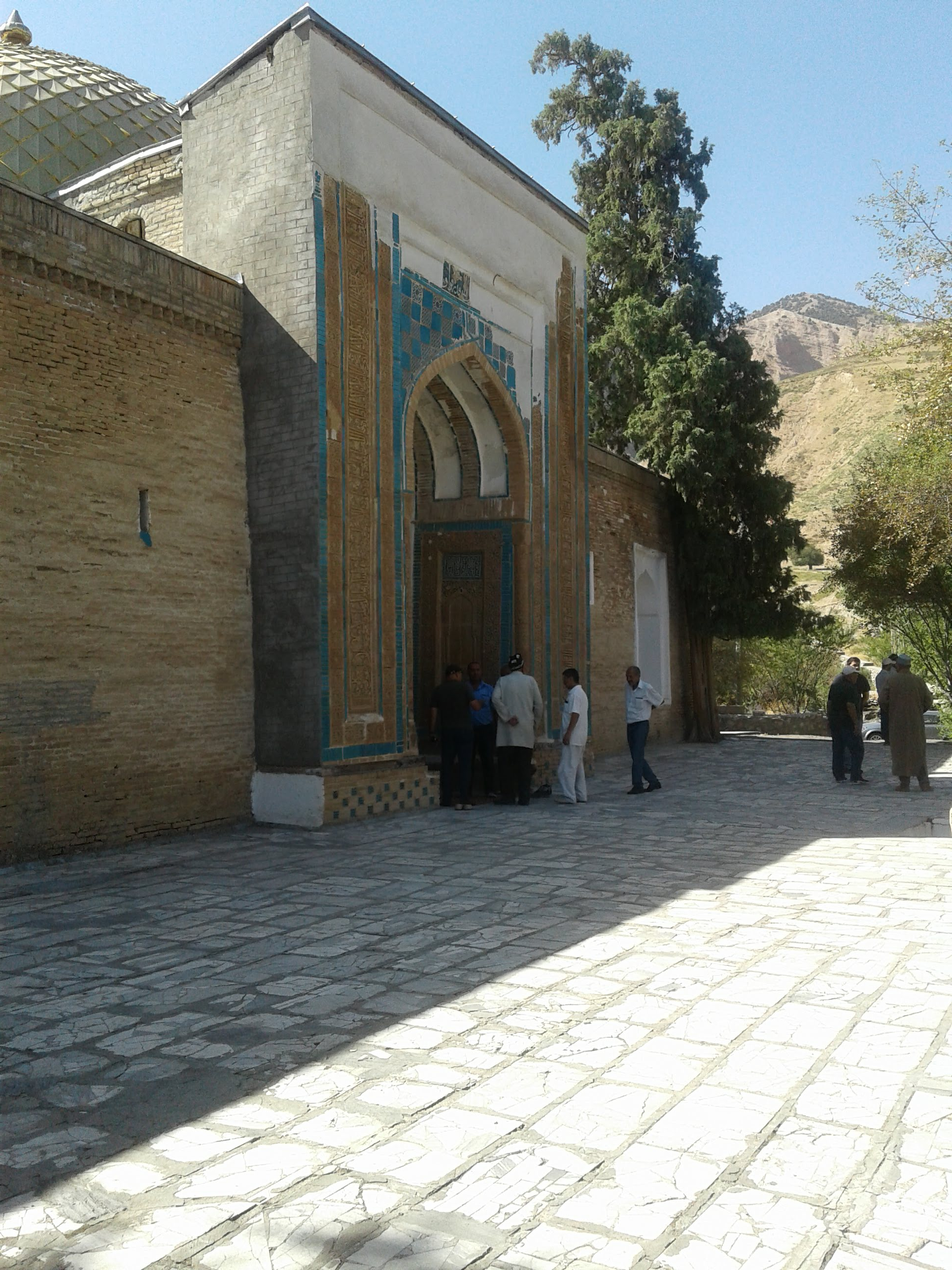
Mausoleum of Mukhammad Bashoro

The Mausoleum of Mukhammad Bashoro (Tajik: Мақбараи Муҳаммади Башоро, romanized: Maqbarai Muhammadi Bashoro) is situated on the bank of mountain river near the settlement of Masori Sharif in Panjakent, Tajikistan.

This site was submitted to the UNESCO World Heritage Tentative List by Off. of Preservation and Restoration of Monum. of History and Culture, Artistic Ex. Min. of Culture on November 9, 1999, in the cultural category.

== Site description ==
The mausoleum was built (without portal) in the 11th and 12th centuries as a building which combined the functions of a mausoleum and a mosque. It consists of a spacious central cupola hall, with rows of vaults on both sides (the left and on the right). They are grouped along two axes, which are parallel to the middle central axis. The left group of the premises of three rooms has individual entrance in the main façade. A portal with rich decoration made of terracotta was added in 1332. The portal has an arch niche of lancet form. A heel of the arch leans on capitals of three-fourths of the columns, which are inscribed into the inner angles of its abutment.

== World Heritage status ==
This site was added to the UNESCO World Heritage Tentative List on November 9, 1999, in the cultural category. It makes up part of the Silk Roads: Zarafshan-Karakum Corridor inscribed in 2023.
