= Mir-Sayid Bakhrom Mausoleum =

World Heritage site in Uzbekistan

Coordinates: 40.14286°N 65.36126°E

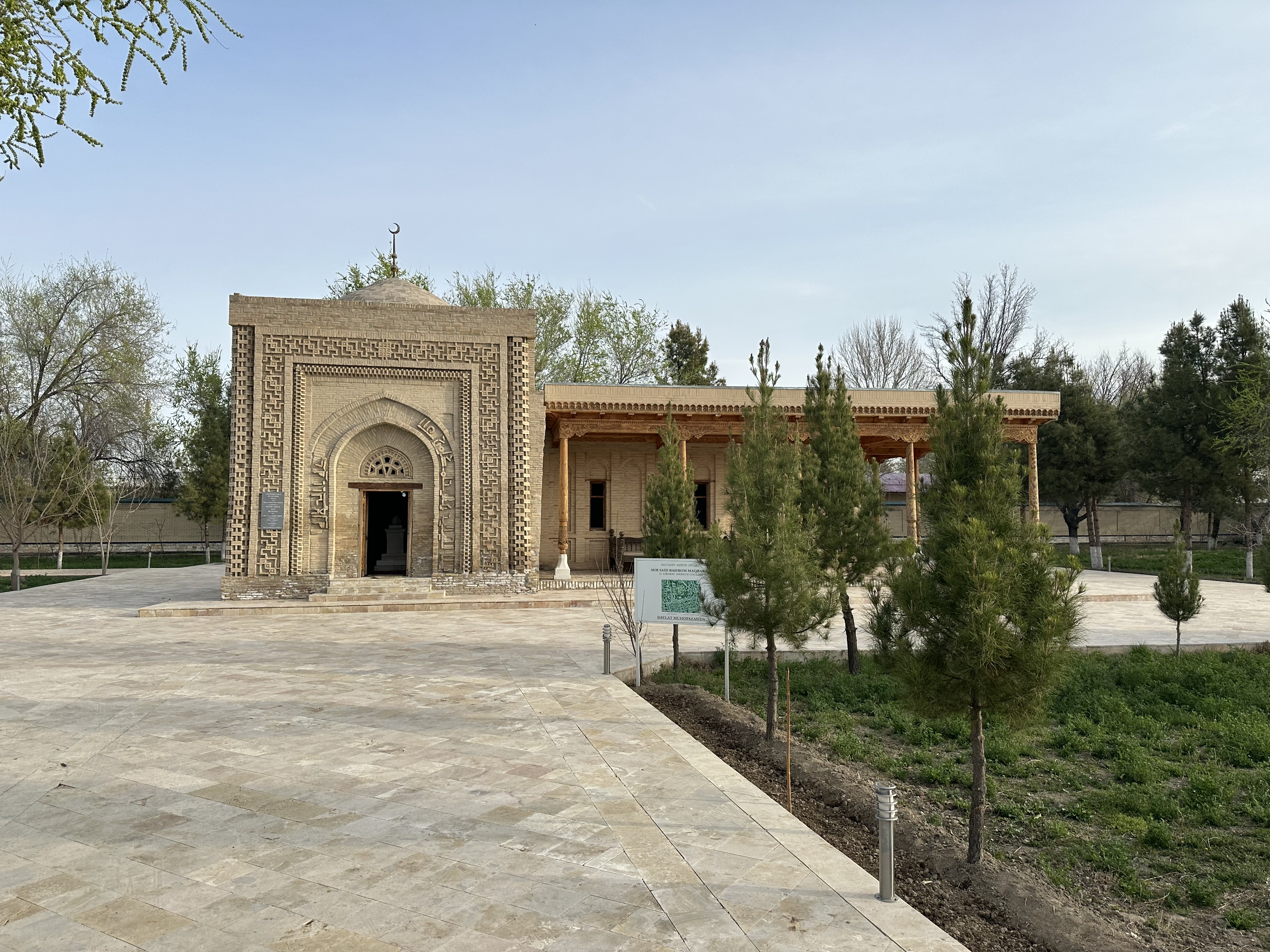
- Mir-Sayid Bakhrom Mausoleum with connected porches

- Location within Uzbekistan

General information
- Type: Mausoleum
- Construction started: 10th-11th century

UNESCO World Heritage Site
- Part of: Silk Roads: Zarafshan-Karakum Corridor
- Criteria: Cultural: ii, iii, v
- Reference: 1675-015
- Inscription: 2023 (45th Session)

References
- Mir-Sayid Bakhrom Mausoleum in map

Mir-Sayid Bakhrom Mausoleum (Uzbek: Mir Said Bahrom) is a 10th-11th century mausoleum in the city of Karmana near Navoiy, Uzbekistan. Mir-Sayid Bakhrom has features similar to the Samanid Mausoleum in Bukhara, Arab-Ata Mausoleum in the Samarkand Region, and to the mausoleum of Oq Ostona Bobo in the Surxondaryo Region. This structure is the smallest mausoleum in Uzbekistan. The mausoleum of Mir Said Bahrom was discovered in 1942 by the archaeologist and orientalist Antonina Pisarchik. After that, the mausoleum was repaired several times. It was completely restored in 1976.

== Architecture ==
In the summer of 1947, when the alabaster plaster inside the mausoleum was removed, scientists had the opportunity to thoroughly study the architecture of the mausoleum. According to studies, the mausoleum was almost square (jam) in shape, the internal dimensions were 4.47x4.40 m. The walls were made of 21x21x2.5 cm small baked bricks with the help of ganchkhok.

The mausoleum is decorated with baked brick in the style typical of the architecture of the Samanid period. The front consists of 3 parts, with a border. Its facade and two sides are made of small bricks. Verses from the Qur'an are written in Kufic script on the border of Ravak. An arc-shaped carved fence on the roof, and bricks on the pillars are made in pairs in the "double" style. The side and back walls are unadorned. The inner dome rests on an 8-sided arch (5 brick columns) with a base. The top is made of brick (26.5×26.5×5 cm). The mausoleum has been renovated several times (1960-70s) and has lost its original appearance. The mausoleum is distinguished by the clear proportion of architectural parts and the compactness of its patterns.

On both sides of the entrance (southern wall) of the Mir Said Bahram mausoleum, octagonal pillars of baked brick measuring 21x21x2.5 cm were raised. The checkerboard pattern of these bricks gives the pillars a bubbly appearance and exaggerates the highlights and shadows on the pillars. Pillars in this form are characteristic of the architecture of the Somonites mausoleum. Forms of the same appearance are present around the entrance arch. Only, in this case, the figure is much smaller and thinner than in the column, its width is 10.5 cm. These shapes are made of half-baked bricks. These checkerboard ornaments include a wide, relief arch with intersecting meanders and squares joined by lines.

Mir-Sayid Bakhrom's mausoleum lost its original appearance due to several renovations. There was a natural hill on the western side of the mausoleum. The hill is surrounded by the Mir-Sayid Bakhrom's cemetery (now there is a restaurant in this place). On the eastern side of the mausoleum was the Mir-Sayid Bakhrom Mosque (now there is part of the park and flat land in place of it). The hill, the tomb and the mosque were destroyed and flattened during the Soviet period. Outside the mausoleum there are four large (1 m tall and 50x50 cm base) and one small (50 cm tall, 25x25 cm base) decorative stone pillars, which are believed to belong to the pillars placed on the porch of the Mir-Sayid Bakhrom. The mausoleum underwent major restoration in 1976, the adjacent buildings and the cemetery were demolished. In 1985–1990, a children's amusement park was built on the south and east sides of the Mir-Sayid Bakhrom mausoleum (in place of the destroyed mosque). A summer cinema with 140 seats, a children's music school and a children's sports school were built and put into use next to the park.

== Archaeological researches ==
In the first half of the 20th century, when Soviet archaeologists organized expeditions in Karmana and began to study historical structures, the facade of Mir-Sayid Bakhrom's mausoleum was plastered beyond recognition, one side was covered with porches connected to the mosque, and only the northern and western walls were visible from the outside. For this reason, many researchers thought that the mausoleum was a modern building and did not pay any attention.

In 1934, the members of the Zarafshan archaeological expedition conducted research in the tomb of Mir-Sayid Bakhrom, but mistakenly they included it among the structures of the later period. Expedition member Vasily Shishkin drew a schematic drawing of the embossed pattern of the building in his diary.

Archaeologist Antonina Pisarczyk, who specialized in the study of the architectural monuments of Karmana in 1942, focused on this mausoleum and published a book with a brief description of the mausoleum and several images. In 1947, the mausoleum was thoroughly studied by architects and archaeologists, and the excess plasters on the exterior and interior were scraped.

== World Heritage status ==
This site was added to the UNESCO World Heritage Tentative List on January 18, 2008, in the Cultural category. It was finally listed as a World Heritage Site in 2023 as part of the Silk Roads: Zarafshan-Karakum Corridor listing.

== Gallery ==
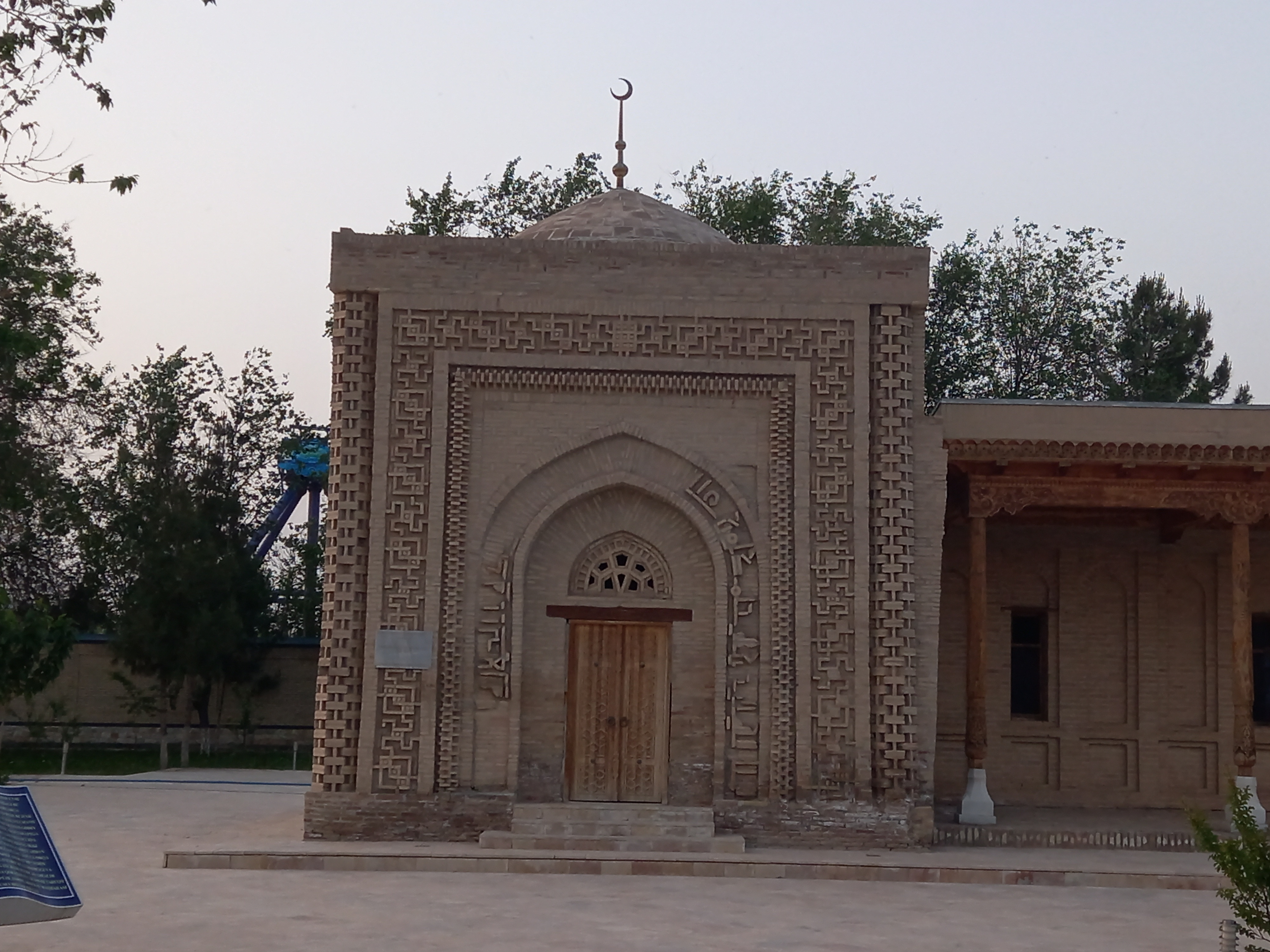

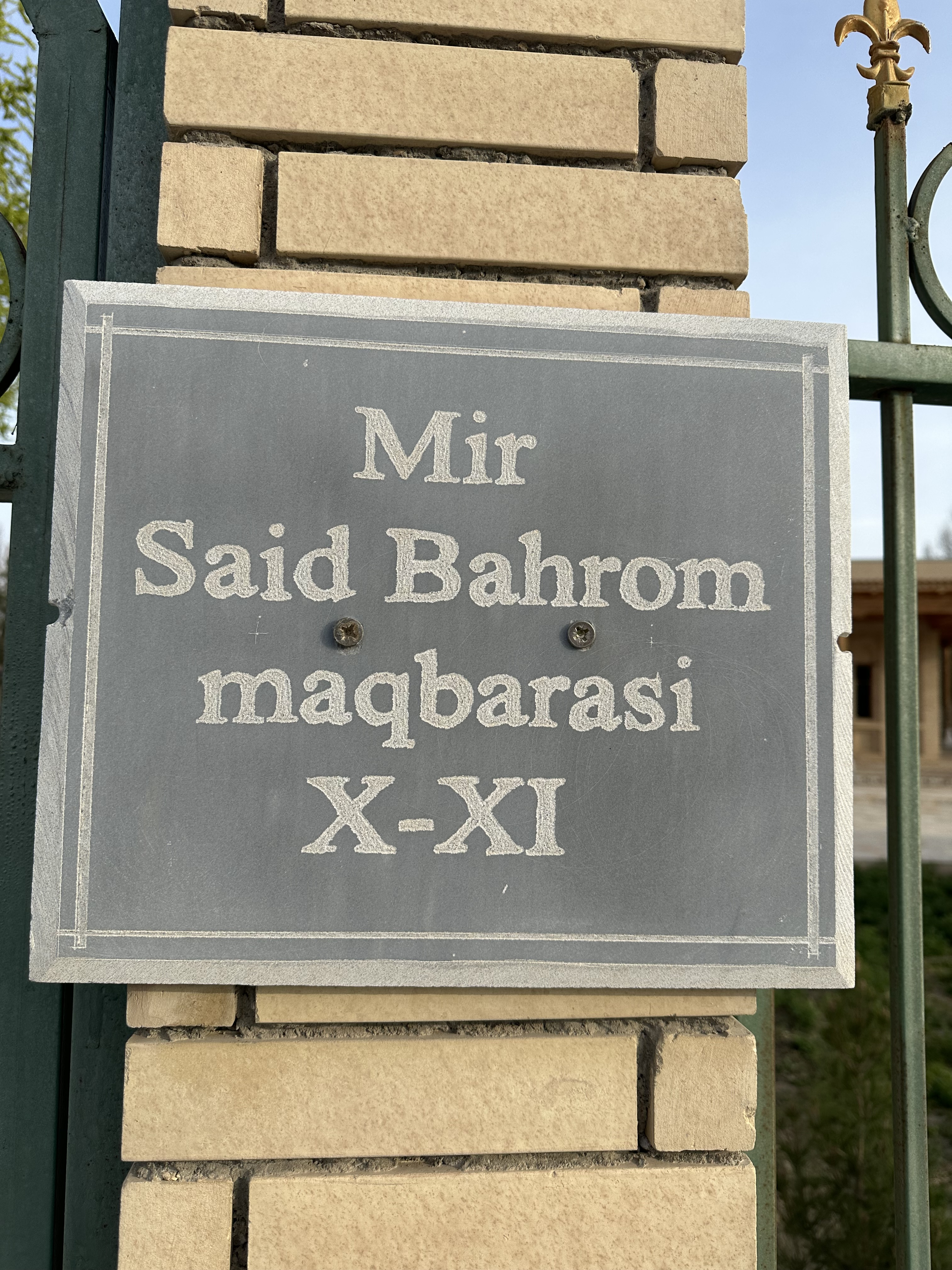

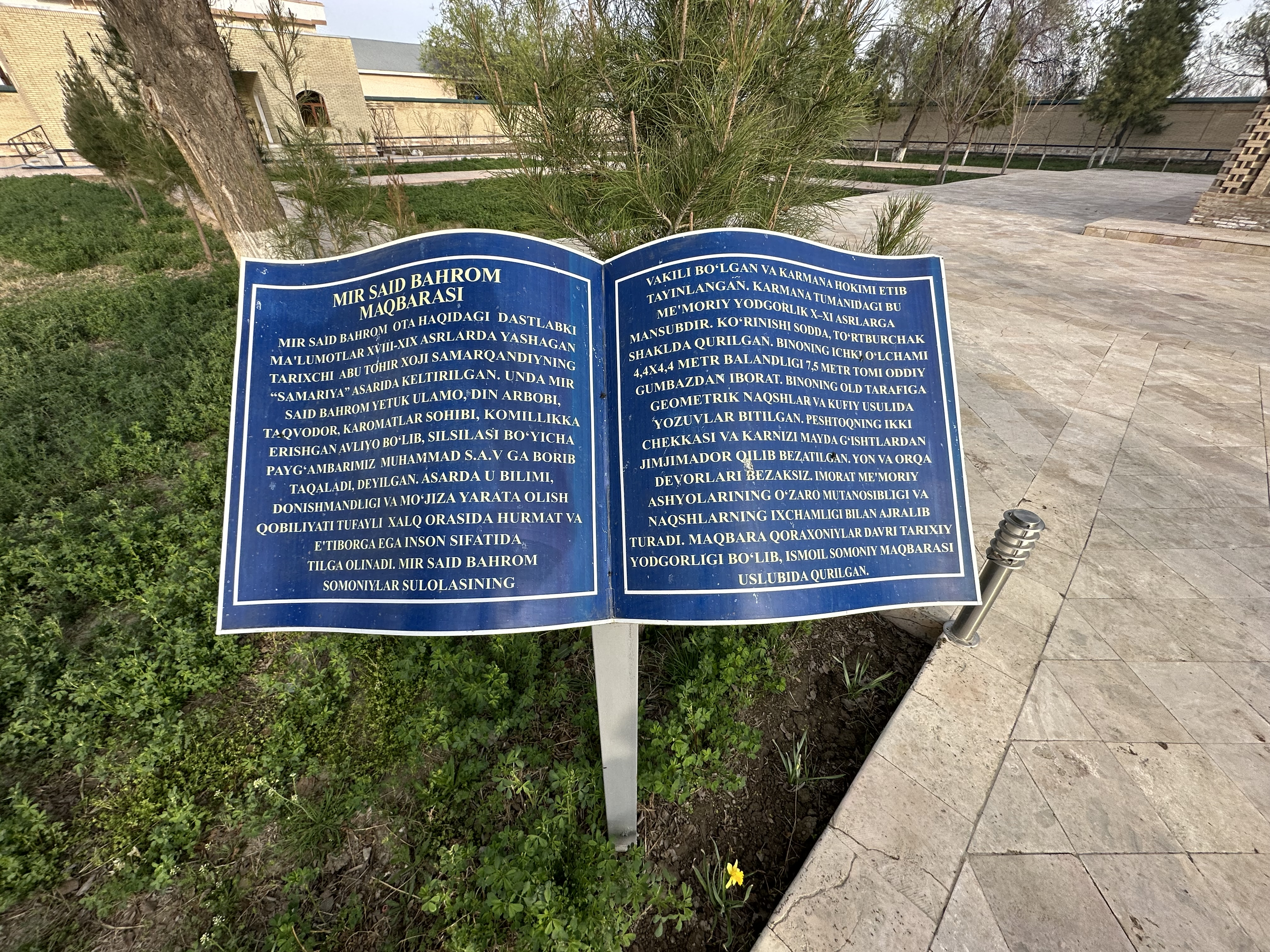

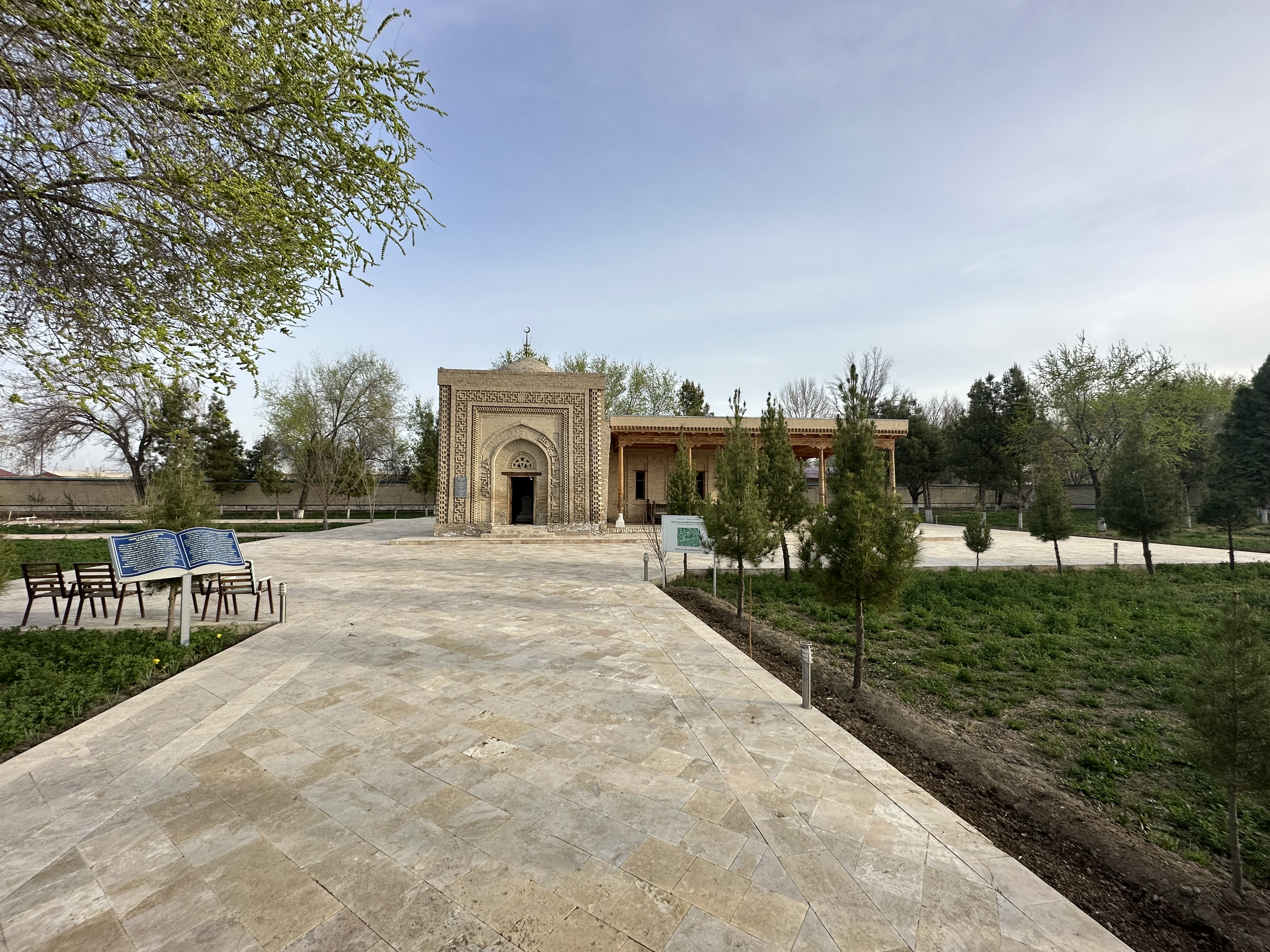

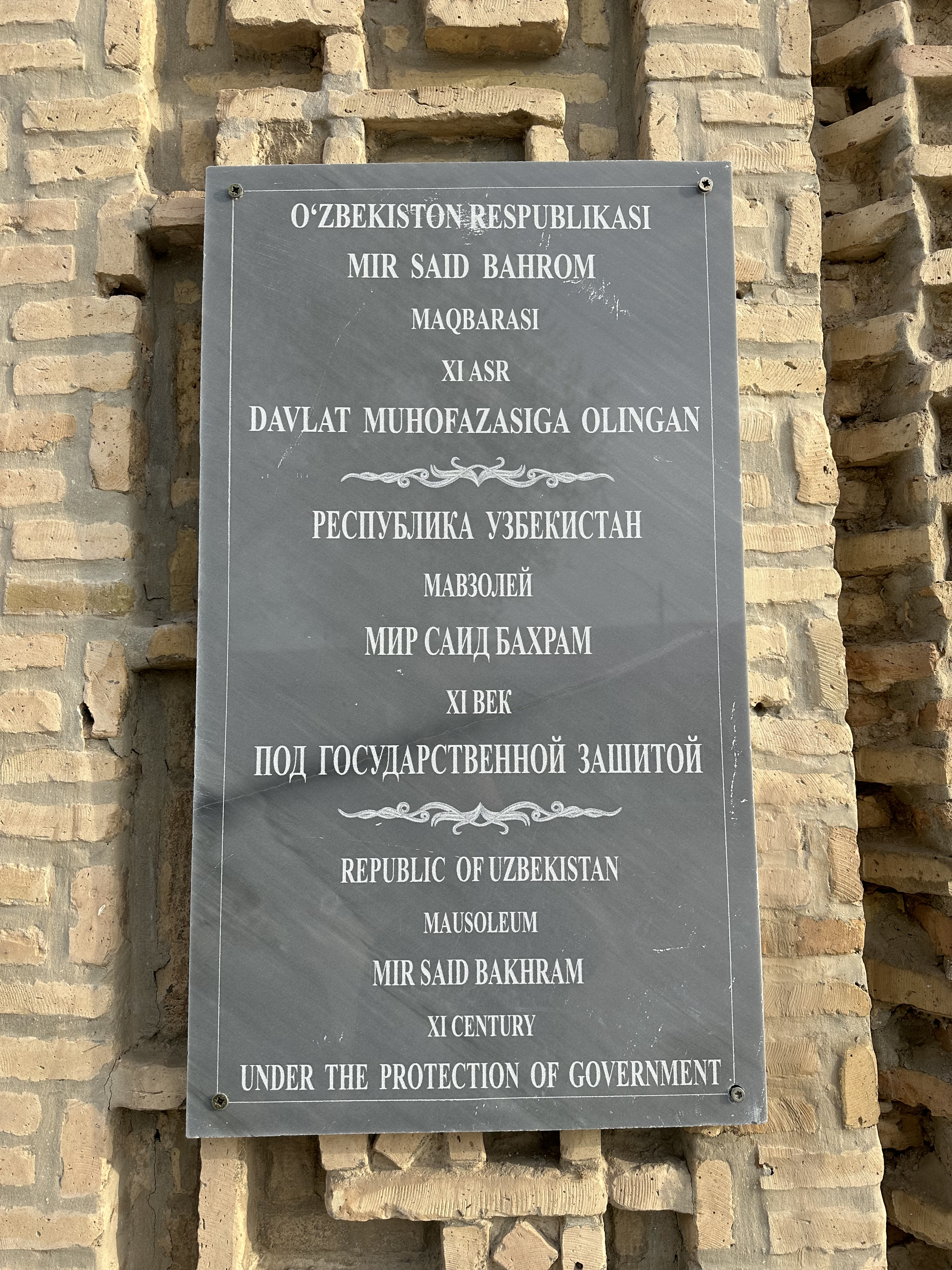

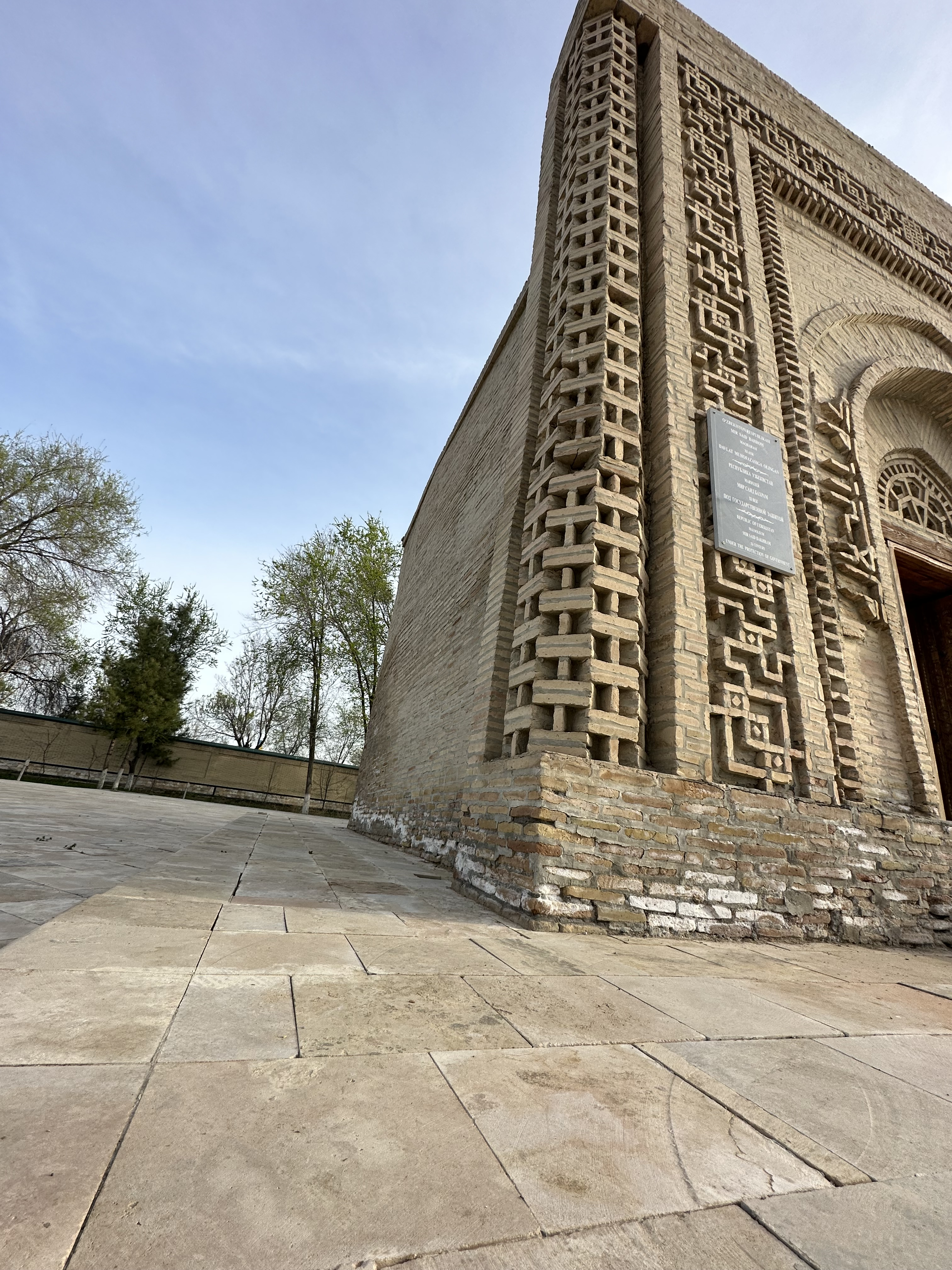

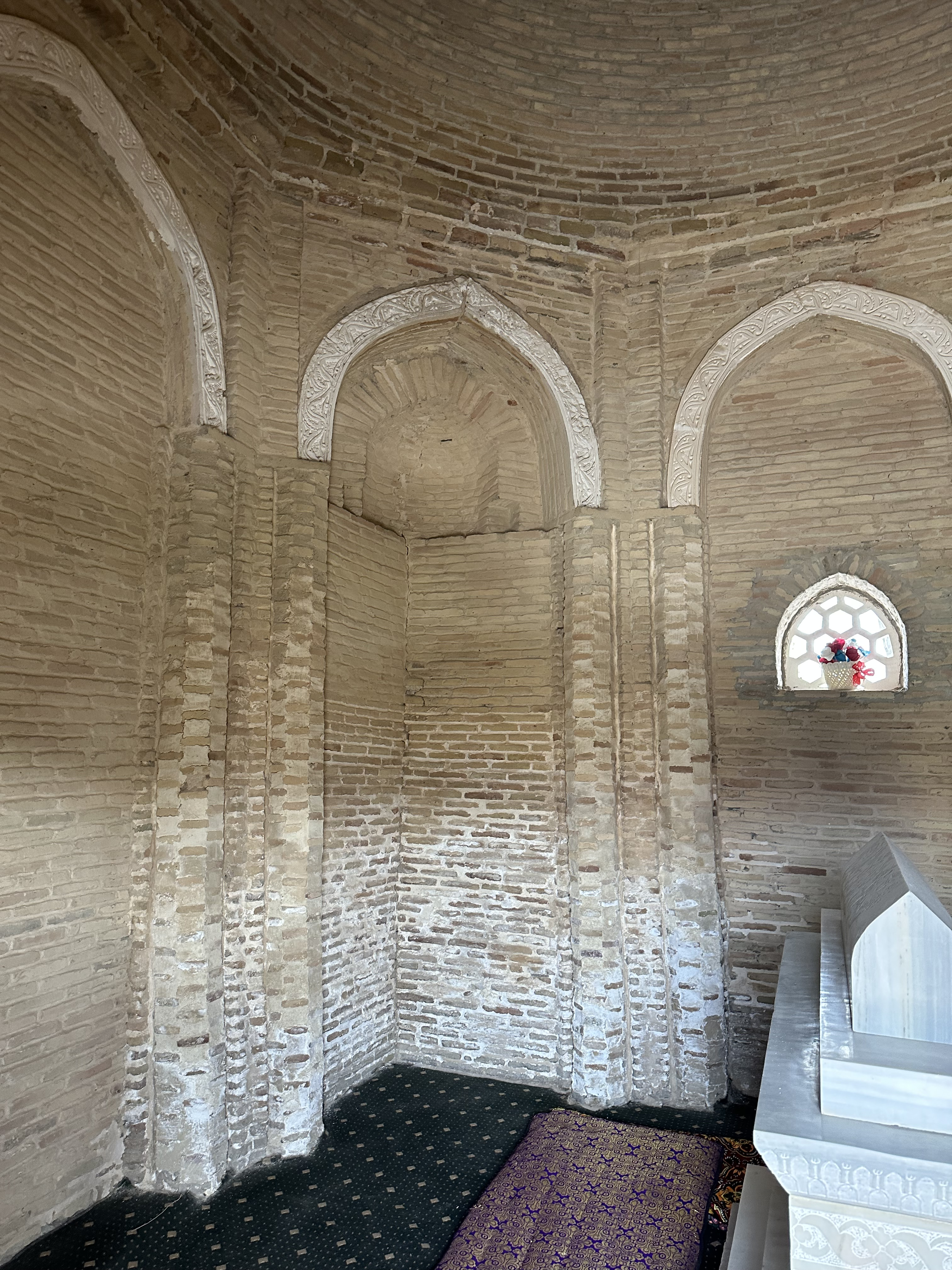

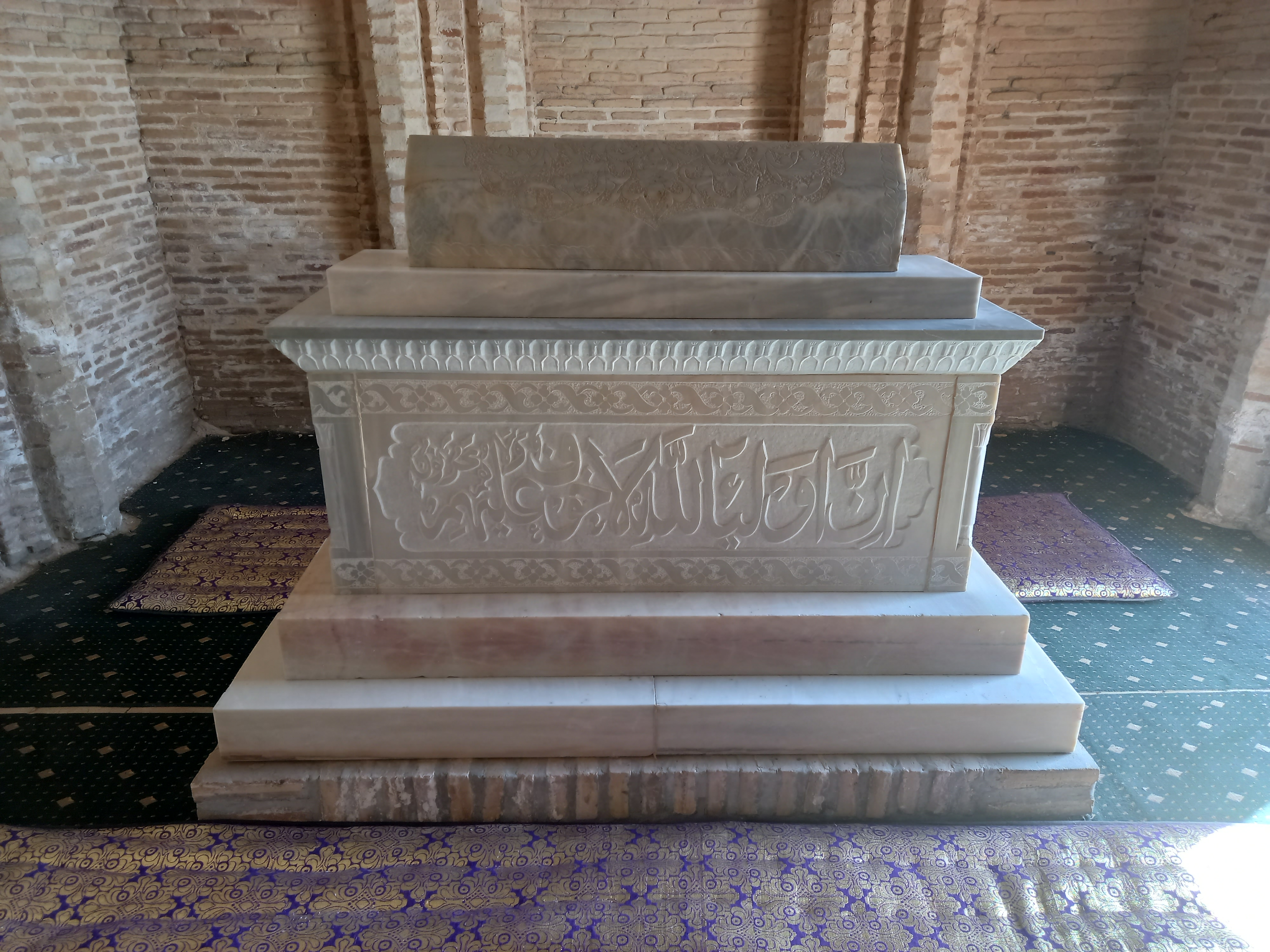

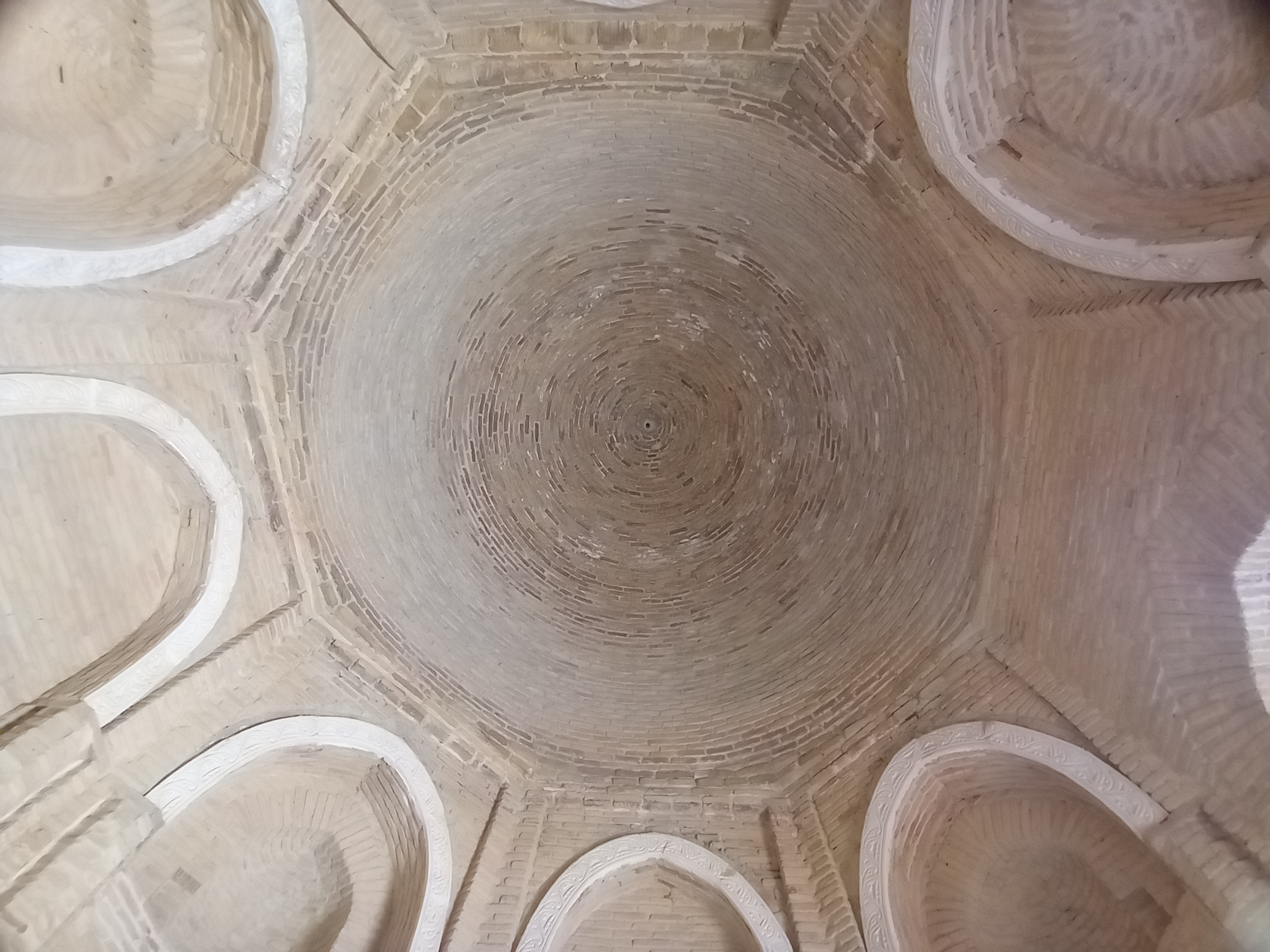

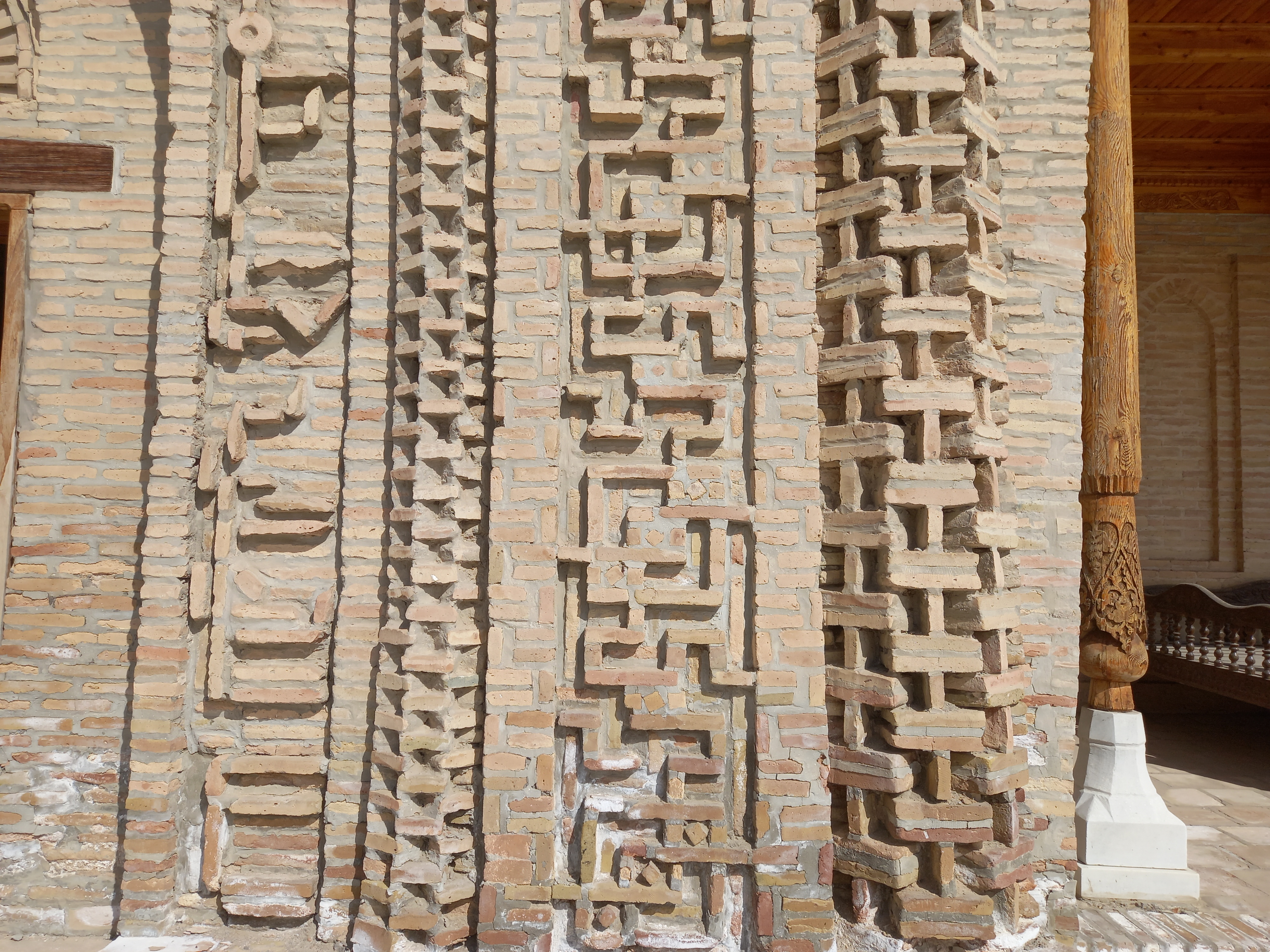

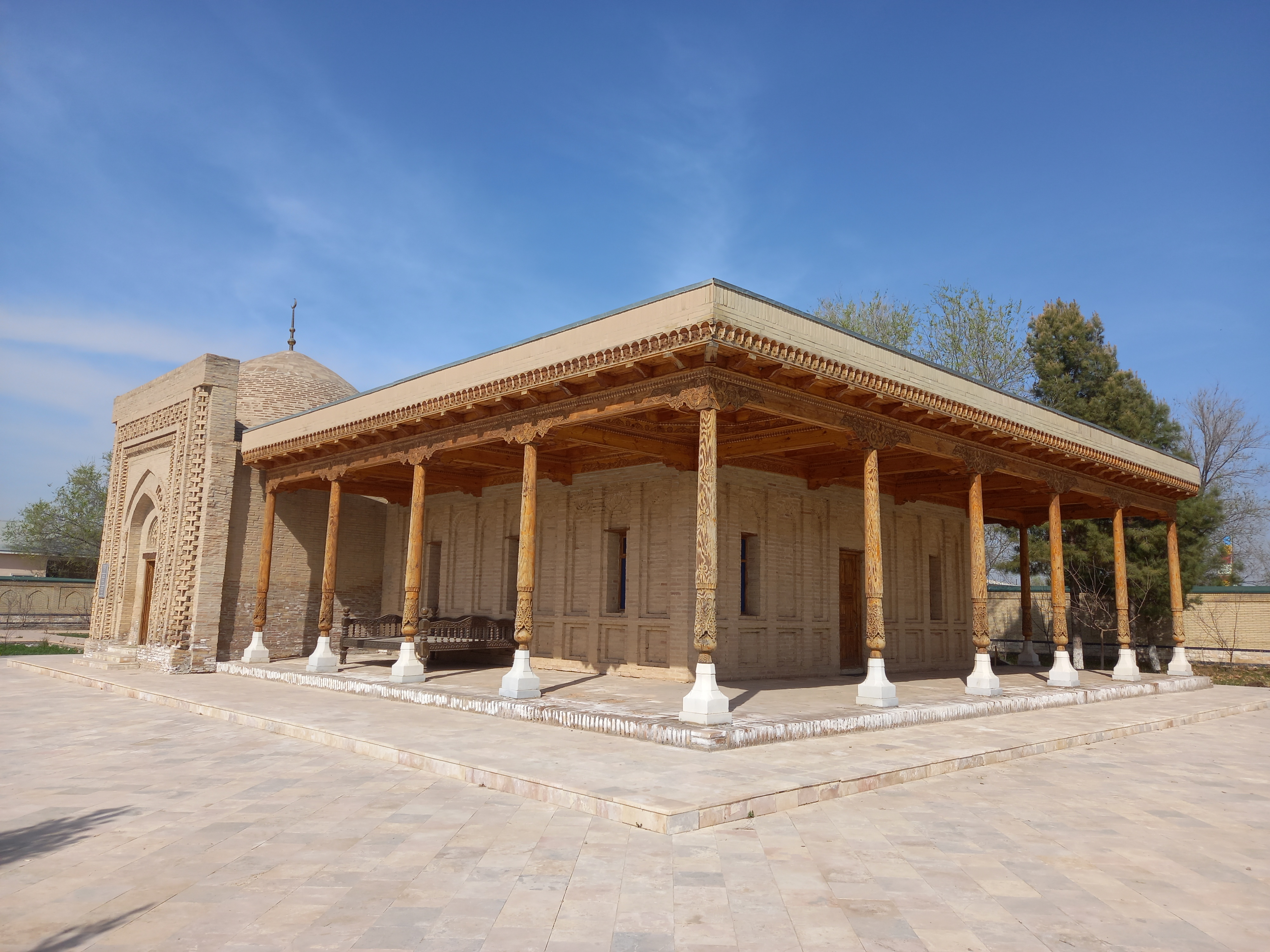

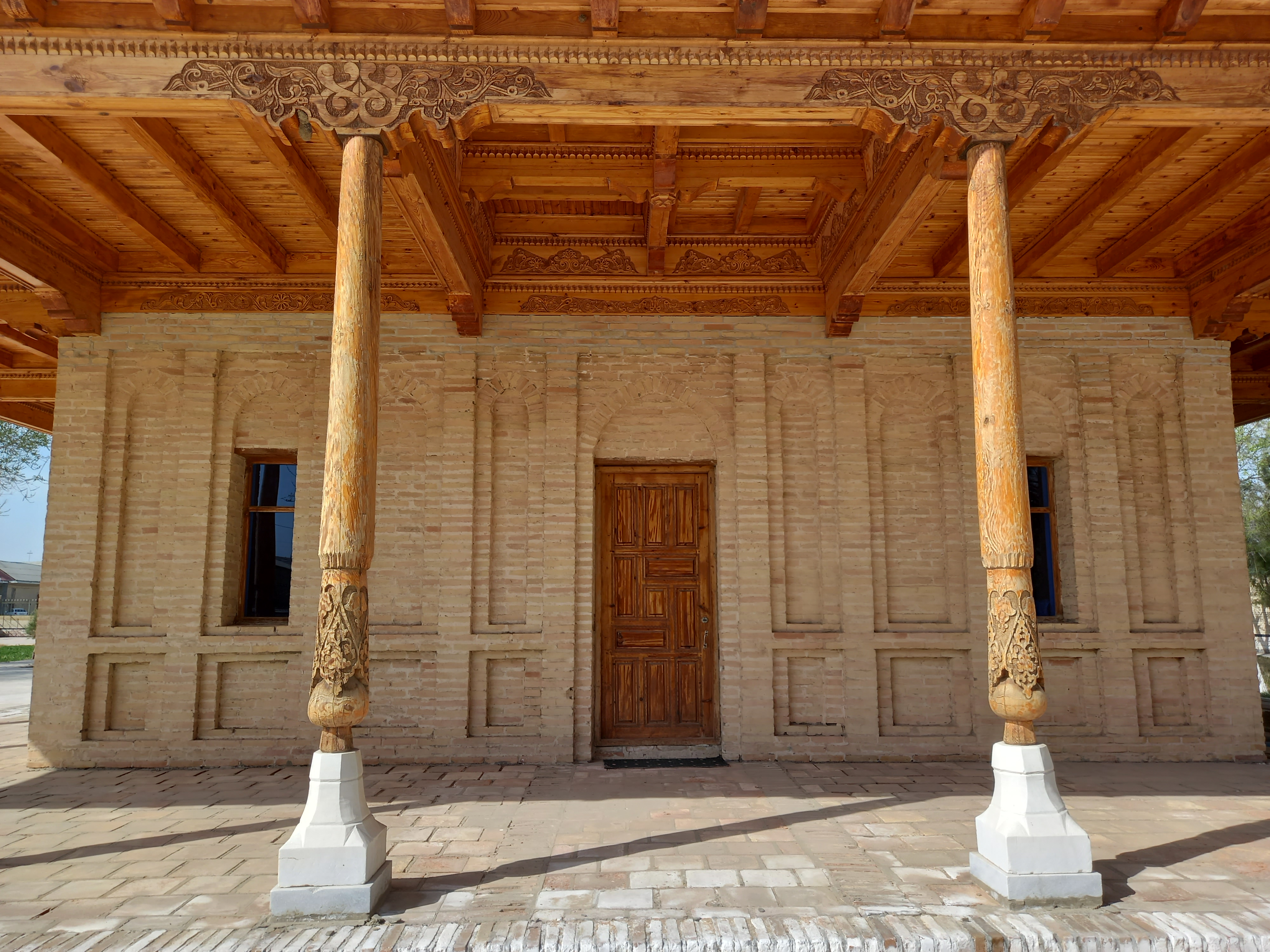

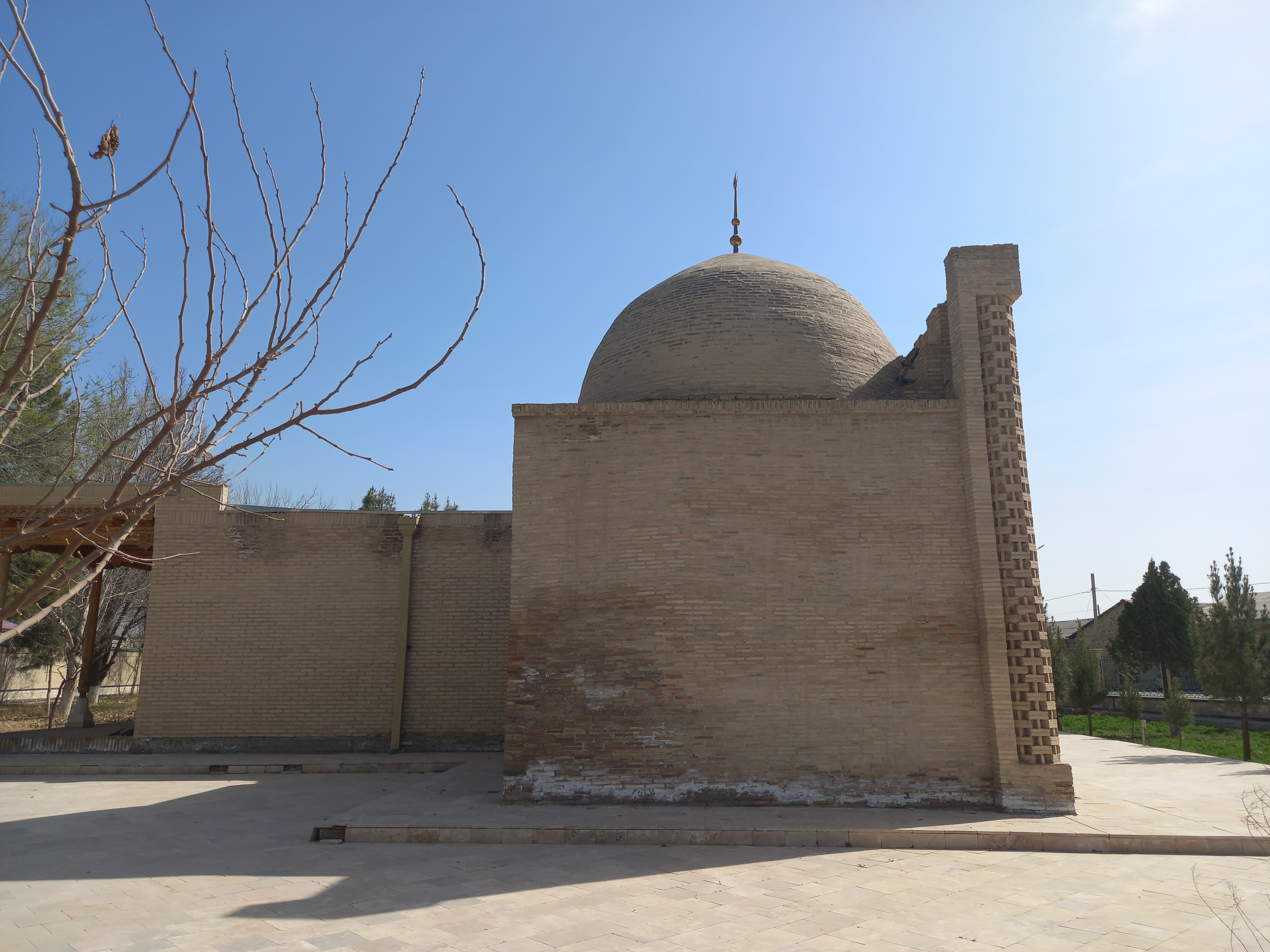

== Sources ==
- Neilsen, V. A. (1950). Мавзолей Мир-Сeид-Бахром в Kermine [Mir Seid Bakhrom Mausoleum in Kermin]. Материалы по истории и теории архитектуры Узбекистана [Materials on the history and theory of architecture of Uzbekistan] (in Russian). Moscow: Publishing House of the Academy of Architecture of the USSR. pp. 52–57.
- Hotamov, A.; Bekniyozov, N. (2007). Karmana — qadimiy diyor [Karmana — an ancient land] (in Uzbek). Tashkent: Oʻzbekiston.
