= Vardanzi =

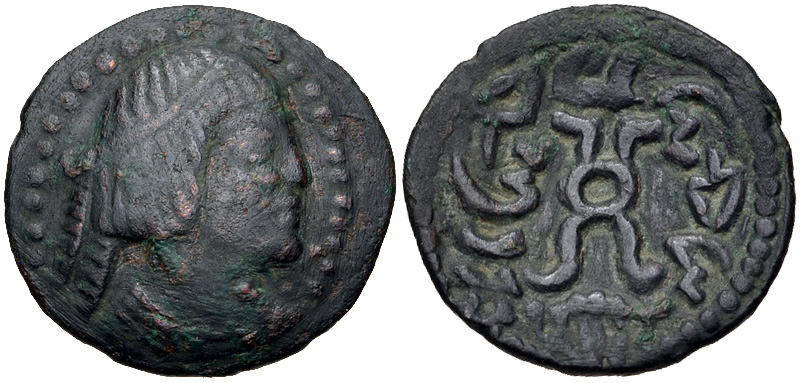
- Type of coin of ruler Asbar, discovered in Vardanzi, Bukhara, Sogdiana. 6th century - first half of the 7th centuries AD. Asbar wears a diadem with frontal crescent.

- Location within Uzbekistan Location within West and Central Asia
- 40°09′N 64°26′E
- Type: City

UNESCO World Heritage Site
- Part of: Silk Roads: Zarafshan-Karakum Corridor
- Criteria: Cultural: ii, iii, v
- Reference: 1675-020
- Inscription: 2023 (45th Session)

Vardanzi, also Vardanze, is an ancient and medieval town located 40 kilometres (25 mi) north-east of Bukhara, Uzbekistan. Today there is a reserve in Shafirkan Bukhara region. Historian Narshakhi recorded that Vardana was a big settlement containing the Kuhandiz Ark, a fortified inner city. From "time immemorial" the rulers of Vardana—the Vardan-khudats—resided here. Vardana was founded much earlier than Bukhara. It was built by an otherwise unknown Sasanian prince named Shapur, son of a Sasanian ruler Khusraw (possibly either Khosrow I (531-578) or Khosrow II (590-628)) and situated on the fringe of Turkestan. Remnants of the old Vardana settlement, now known as Vardanze, have survived as a large hill. Vardana, Narshakhi believed, was older than Bukhara, having been built in the 6th century A.D. At the time, Vardanzi was large and well-known city, but due to the translational motion of sand, in the 19th century it was bombarded by them and became uninhabitable.

Vardanzi was ruled by a dynasty of kings who bore the title of Vardan-khudat. The city in those days was of great strategic, industrial and commercial importance. It was a border crossing point for the nomads. The Arabs, led by Qutayba ibn Muslim in the years 708–709, conquered the Romitan possession of Vartan-haudatov.

According to legend, this town was built by a Sassanian prince who had moved to Bukhara and received land from his ruler more than two thousand years ago. Construction of a canal in the area made the Persian prince Shapur popular. The channel—Shapurkam—was named after the legendary prince.
