= Vobkent Minaret =

Minaret in Bukhara Region of Uzbekistan

- Vobkent minorasi
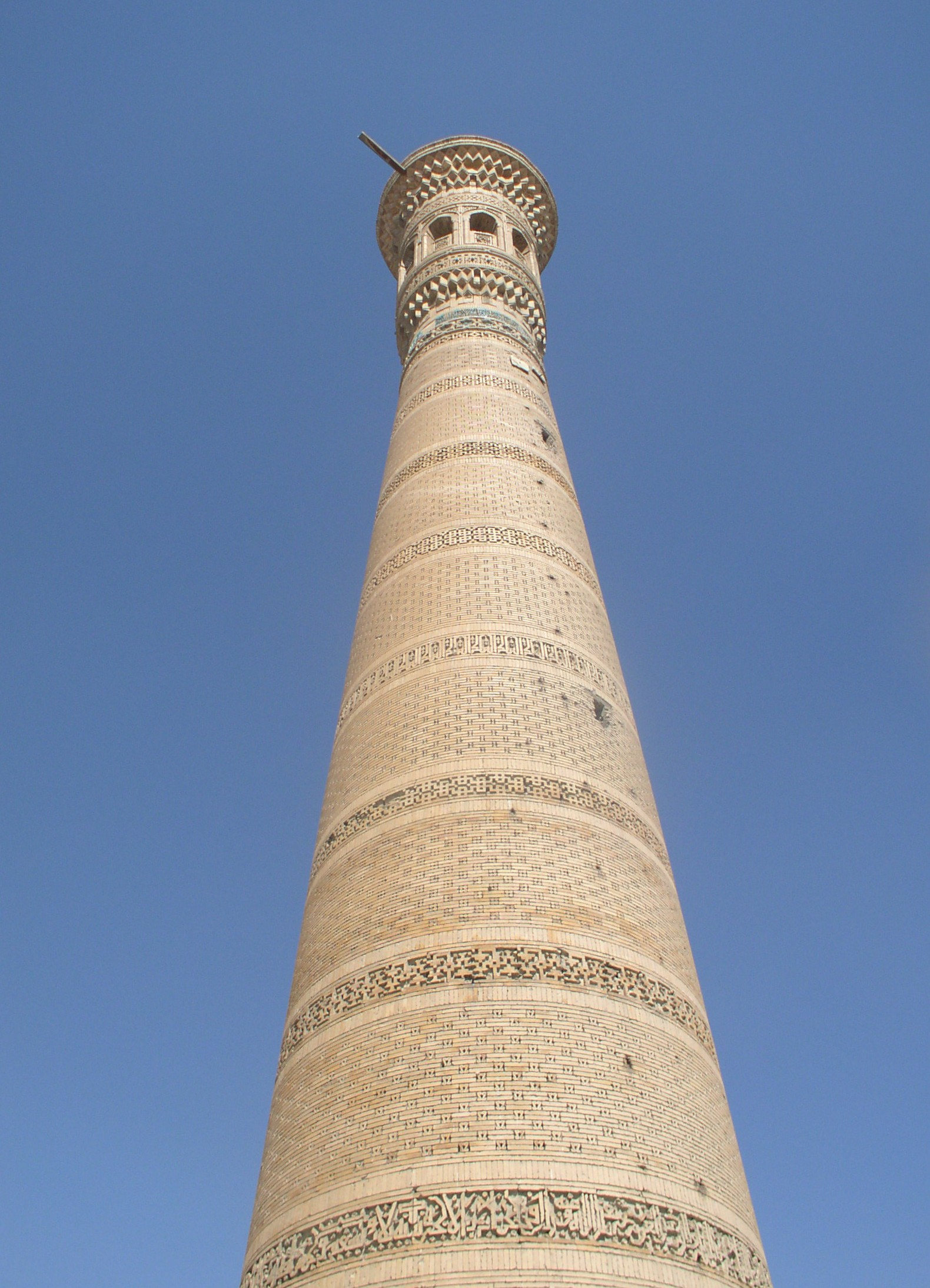
- Interactive map of the Vobkent Minaret area

General information
- Classification: Minaret
- Location: Bukhara, Uzbekistan
- Year built: 1198

UNESCO World Heritage Site
- Part of: Silk Roads: Zarafshan-Karakum Corridor
- Criteria: Cultural: ii, iii, v
- Reference: 1675-021
- Inscription: 2023 (45th Session)

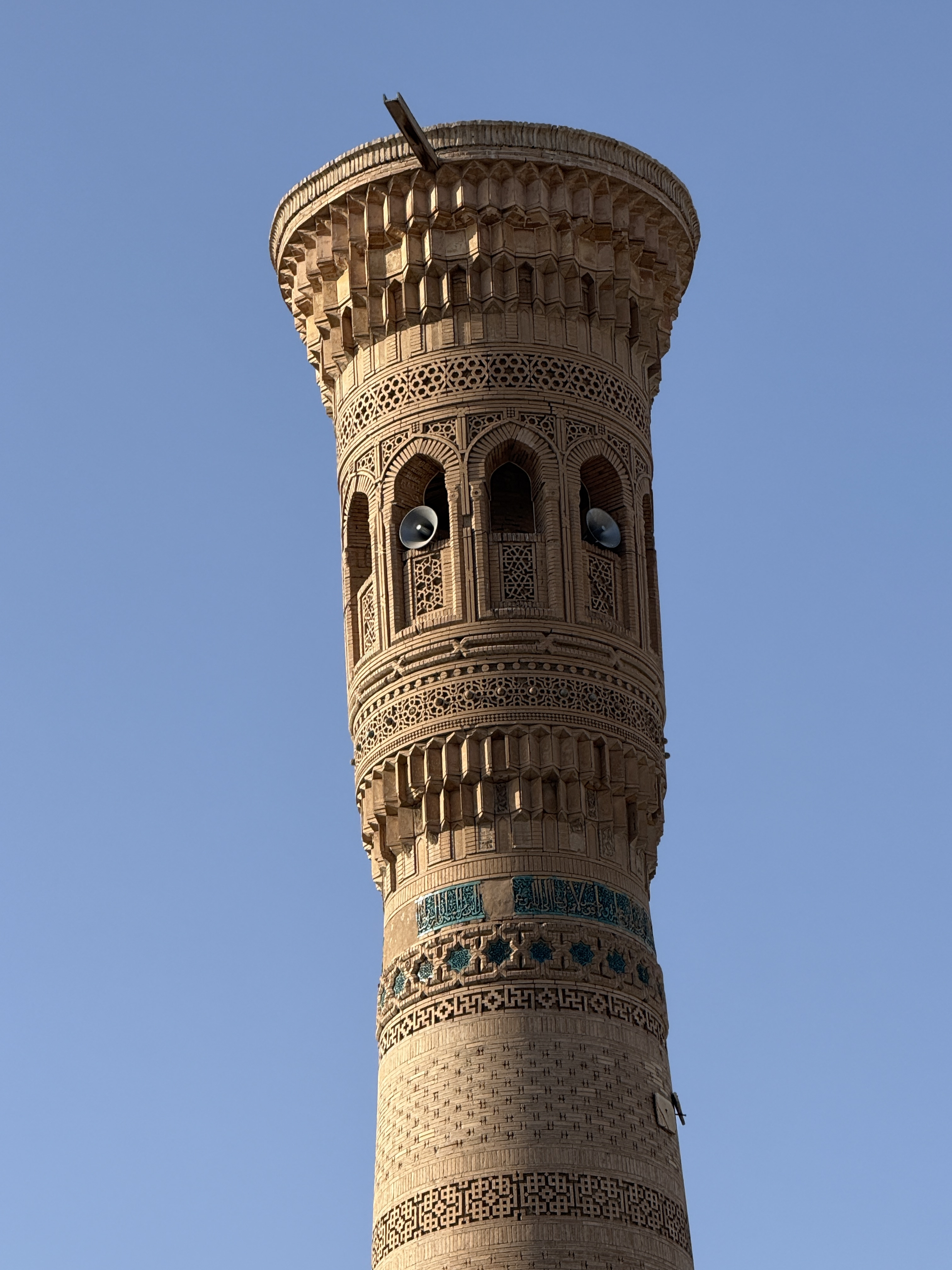
Detail of Vobkent Minaret

The Vobkent Minaret is a historical monument in the city of Vobkent, in the Bukhara region. It was built in 1198 by Abdulaziz Sadr, a ruler of the Qarakhanid dynasty. It is currently listed in the national register of immovable cultural heritage of Uzbekistan.

== History ==
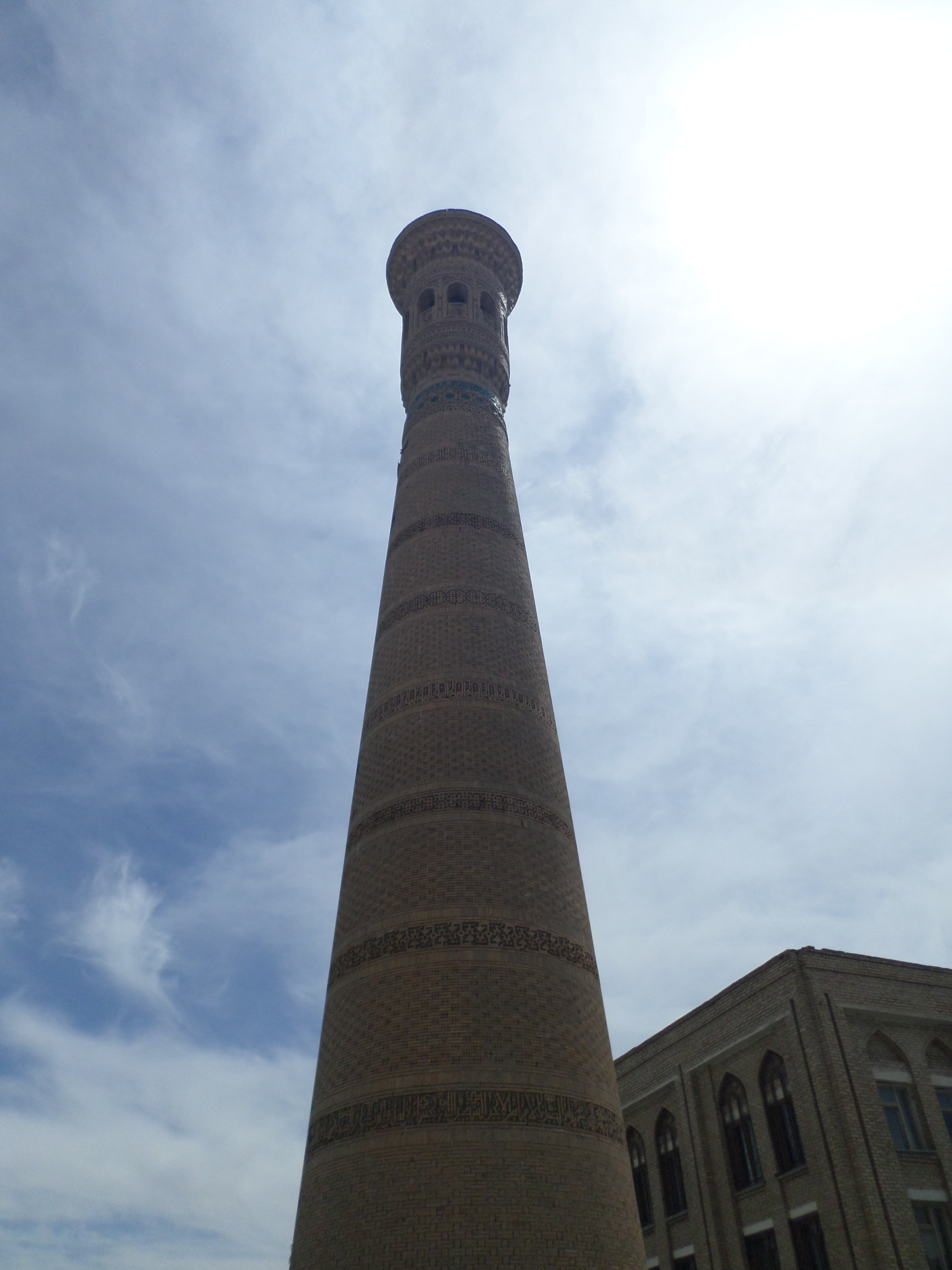
Vobkent minaret 14-35

The Vobkent Minaret was built in 1198 by Abdulaziz Sadr, a descendant of the sadrs, a noble family of the Qarakhanid dynasty, in the Vobkent district of Bukhara region. In front of the minaret, there was a madrasa and a mosque, and some parts of them have been preserved until today.

The minaret has a cylindrical shape with a conical top, decorated with colorful glazed tiles. The upper part of the minaret is inscribed with a band of Arabic letters, each containing several words. In 1989 research on the minaret revealed that the upper inscription blocks were misplaced during construction.

The upper inscription contains a hadith (saying of Muhammed). The inscriptions are written in Kufic script. The upper inscription also says the minaret was completed in 1198.

The lower part of the minaret also has inscriptions, which read:

In the name of the most merciful and compassionate God (I begin). This minaret was built by the hopeful sadr, great imam, martyr, fortunate, (the proof of the nation and religion) Abdulaziz ibn Muhammad ibn Sadr, great imam, martyr (the sword of the nation and religion) Umar ibn Sadr, great imam, generous (the proof of the nation and religion) Abdulaziz Umar by his order in the month of Jumada al-Awwal of the year 593 (March-April 1196). May God accept him.

After independence it underwent restoration.

== Architecture ==
The Vobkent Minaret is made of baked bricks, wood, stone and gypsum. The minaret is mounted on a twelve-ribbed base with a diameter of 6.19 meters at the bottom and 2.81 meters at the top. It was accessed by a spiral staircase through a door on the side of the adjacent mosque. The minaret is divided into ten sections by ten belts with different patterns, each section having a unique design of glazed tiles. The lower inscriptions contain the name and the year of the builder (Sadr Burhan al-Din Abdulaziz II) in Kufic style. The top of the minaret is widened and covered with a cage-like structure (diameter 3.66 meters), with ten arches between ten columns, the lower part of the arches being filled with glazed tiles. The base of the minaret is buried under the ground, and archaeological studies have shown that its original height was 2.3 meters higher. The total height of the minaret is 40.3 meters.
