= Vobkent District =

Coordinates: 40°01′12″N 64°31′12″E

- District
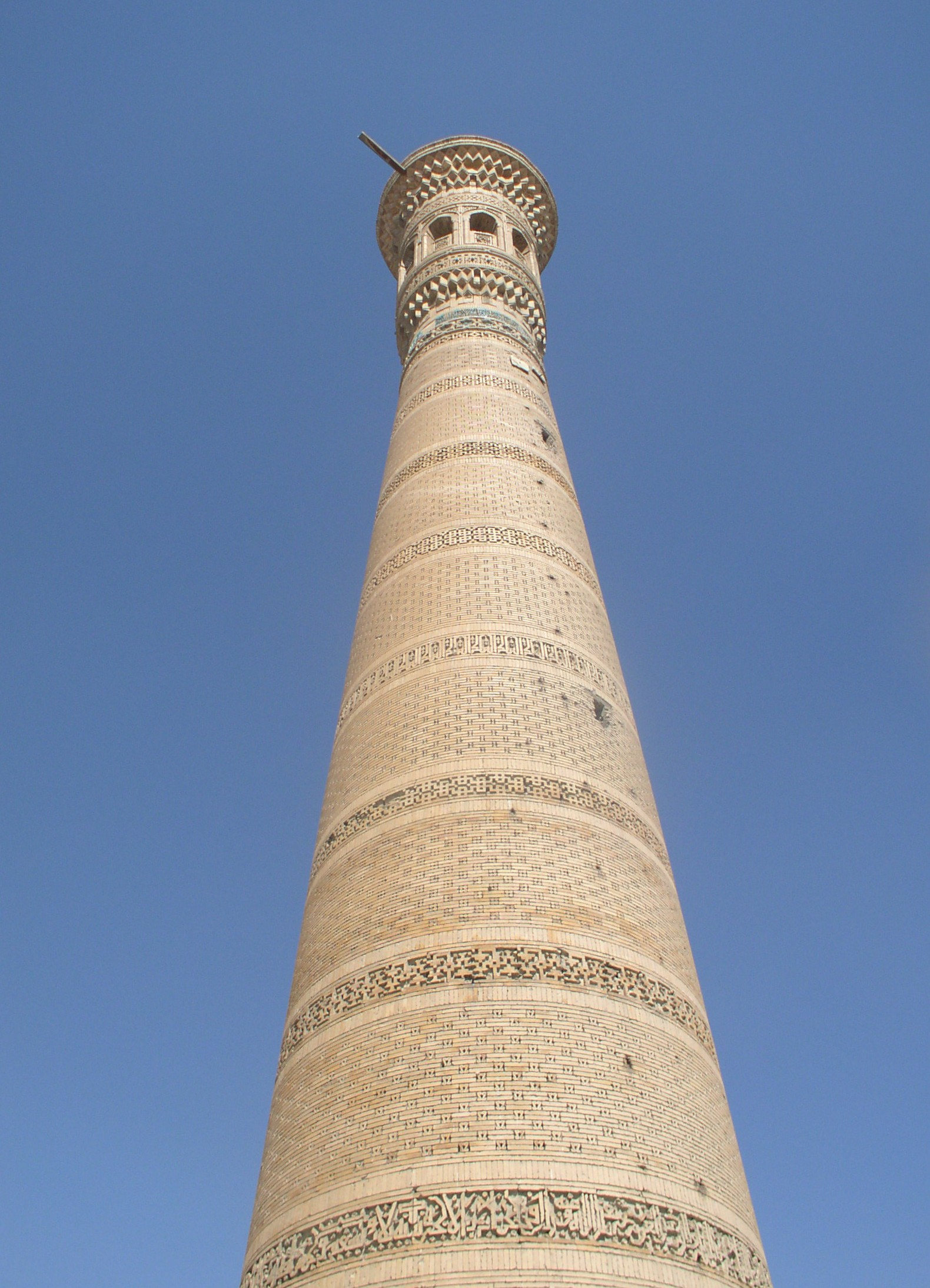
- Vobkent town

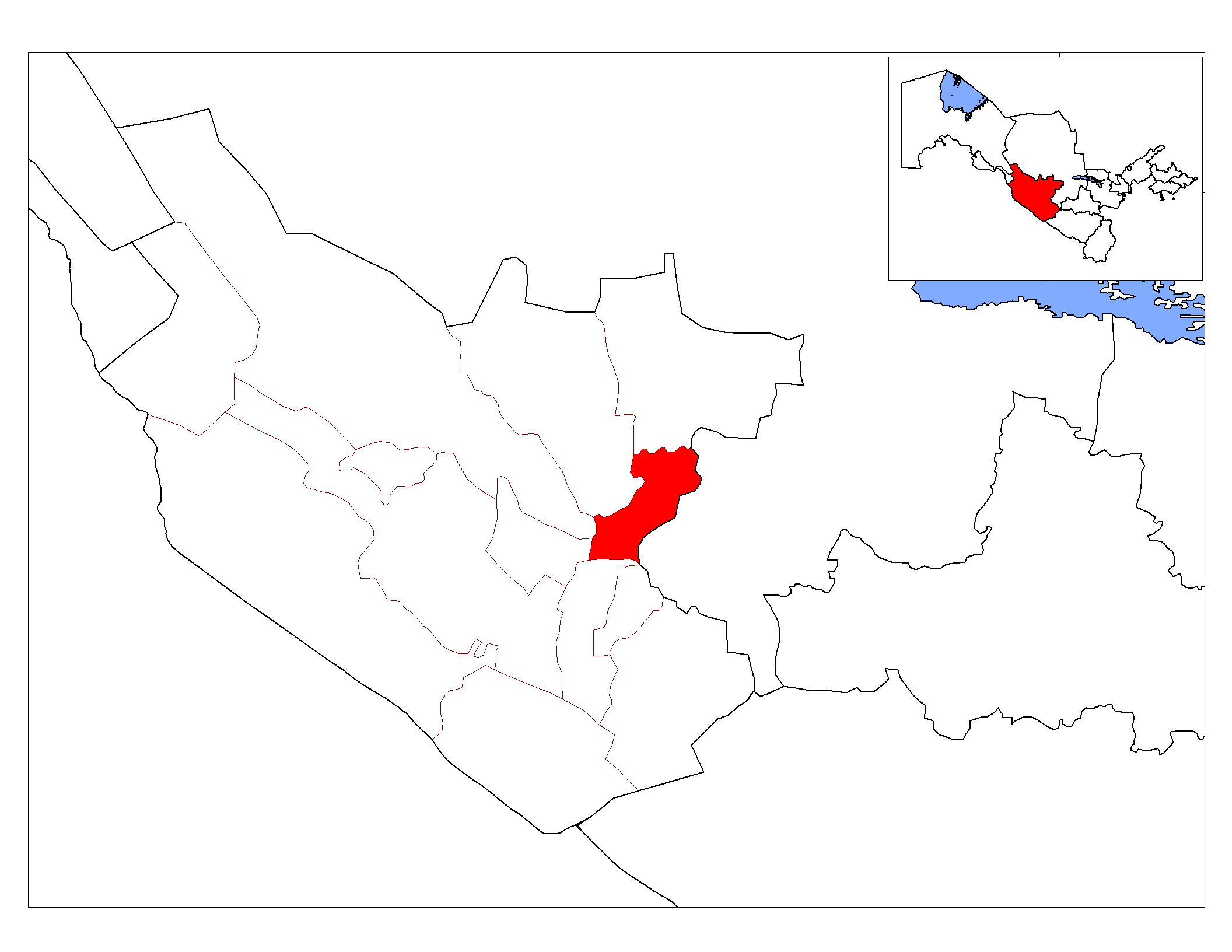
- Country: Uzbekistan
- Region: Bukhara Region
- Capital: Vobkent

Area
  - Total: 290 km^{2} (110 sq mi)

Population (2021)
  - Total: 143,600
  - Density: 500/km^{2} (1,300/sq mi)
- Time zone: UTC+5 (UZT)

Vobkent District (Uzbek: Vobkent tumani) is a district of Bukhara Region in Uzbekistan. The capital is Vobkent. It has an area of 290 km^{2} (110 sq mi) and its population is 143,600 (2021).

The district consists of 1 city (Vobkent), 3 urban-type settlements (Navbahor, Shirin, Kosari) and 11 rural communities.
