= Rabati Malik =

12th-century ruin in Uzbekistan

Coordinates: 40°7′22″N 65°8′53″E

- Rabati Malik, Shoh raboti
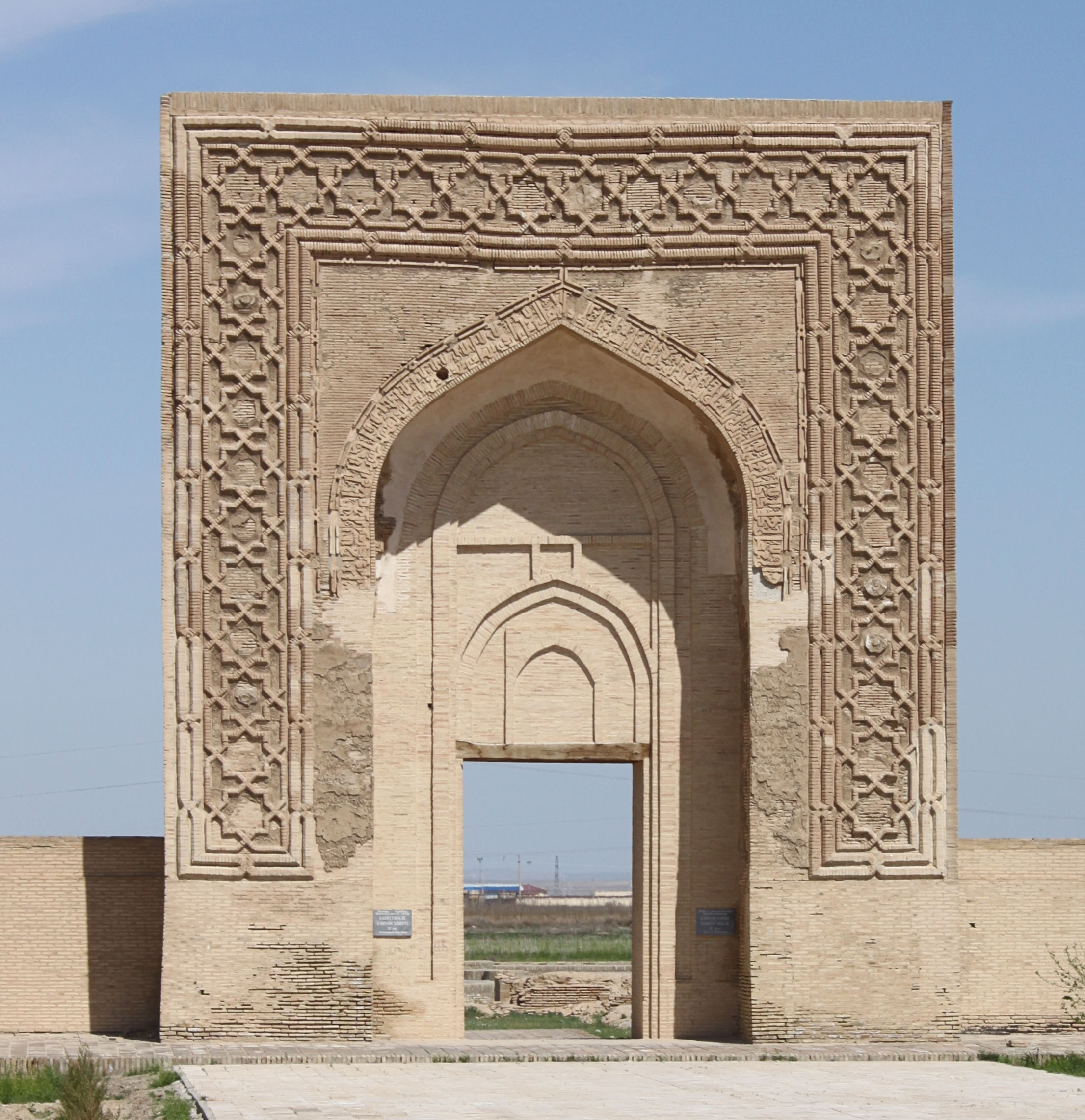

General information
- Location: Karmana District, Uzbekistan
- Construction started: 1068
- Owner: Uzbek government

UNESCO World Heritage Site
- Part of: Silk Roads: Zarafshan-Karakum Corridor
- Criteria: Cultural: ii, iii, v
- Reference: 1675-016
- Inscription: 2023 (45th Session)

Rabati Malik, also called Ribat-i Malik, is a caravanserai ruin located on the M37 road from Samarkand to Bukhara about a kilometer west of the edge of Malik, Navoiy Province, Uzbekistan. It was constructed along the Silk Road according to the orders of Karakhanid Shams al-Mulk Nasr, son of Tamgachkhan Ibragim, who ruled in Samarkand from 1068 until 1080.

== Architecture ==
During its construction, the Raboti Malik caravanserai was surrounded by two rows (outer and inner) of fortification walls. The tradition of enclosing caravanserai, palaces and temples with two rows of walls has been preserved in the architecture of Central Asia since the Bronze Age. Structures were surrounded by such a double-row wall mainly for protection purposes, besides, it also allowed to expand the area used for economic work. Historians speculate that the area between the walls was used to store cattle or fodder for cattle.

The inner fortress is surrounded by thick walls (the height of the southern and northern walls is about 2.35 m, the western and eastern parts are 1.5 m, the height of the front wall is about 12 m).These walls were restored in the form of a square measuring 84–86 m, and there were circular towers at the corners of its four sides (based on the research of Boris Zasipkin). Until the time of Zasipkin's studies, only the one of these towers, which was located in the southwestern corner, was preserved, while the other three have only unknown traces.

The main facade of the building faces south. There is a huge pediment in the center of the facade, which is the oldest surviving pediment of medieval architecture.

== History ==
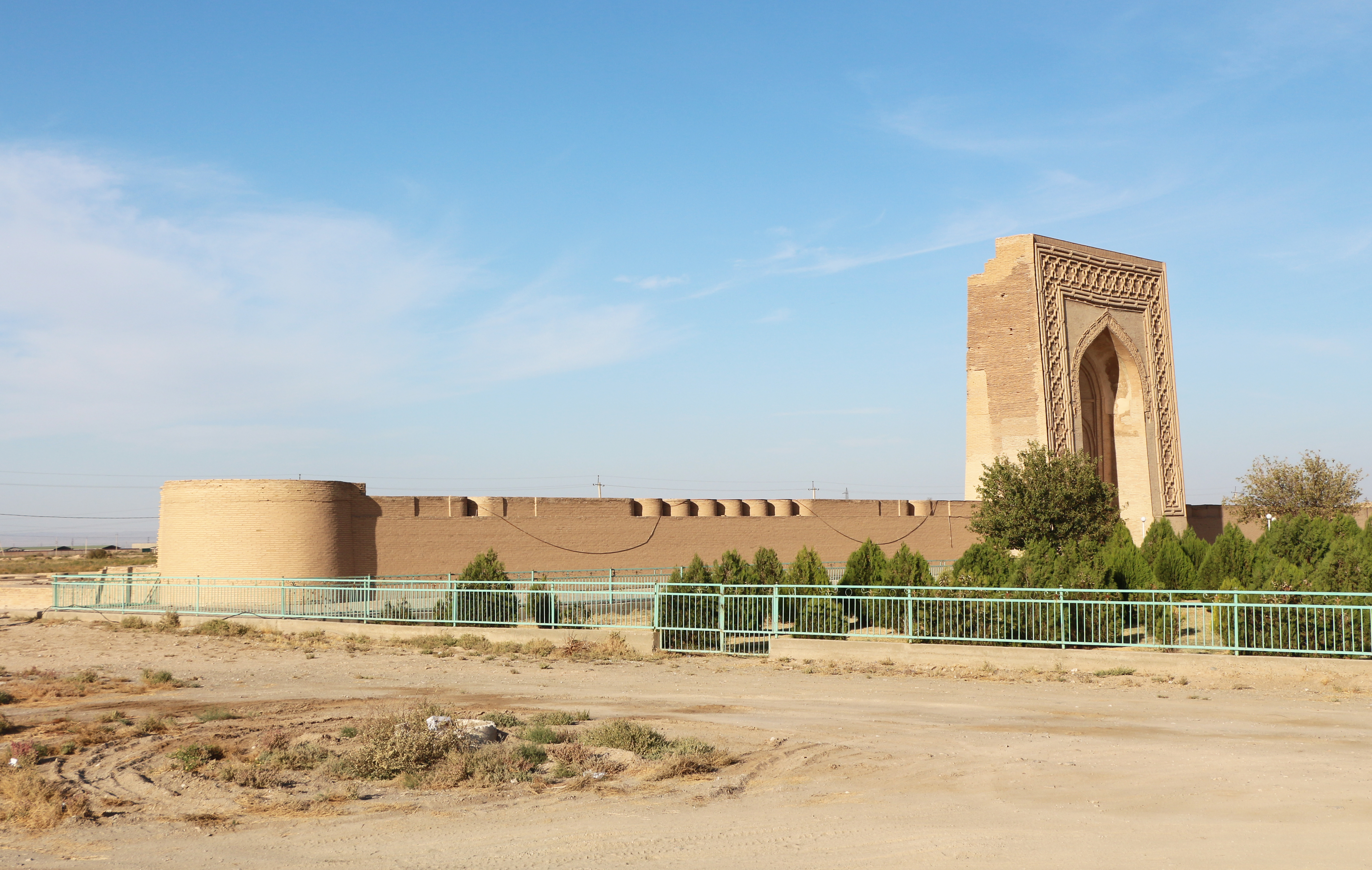
Walls of Rabati Malik

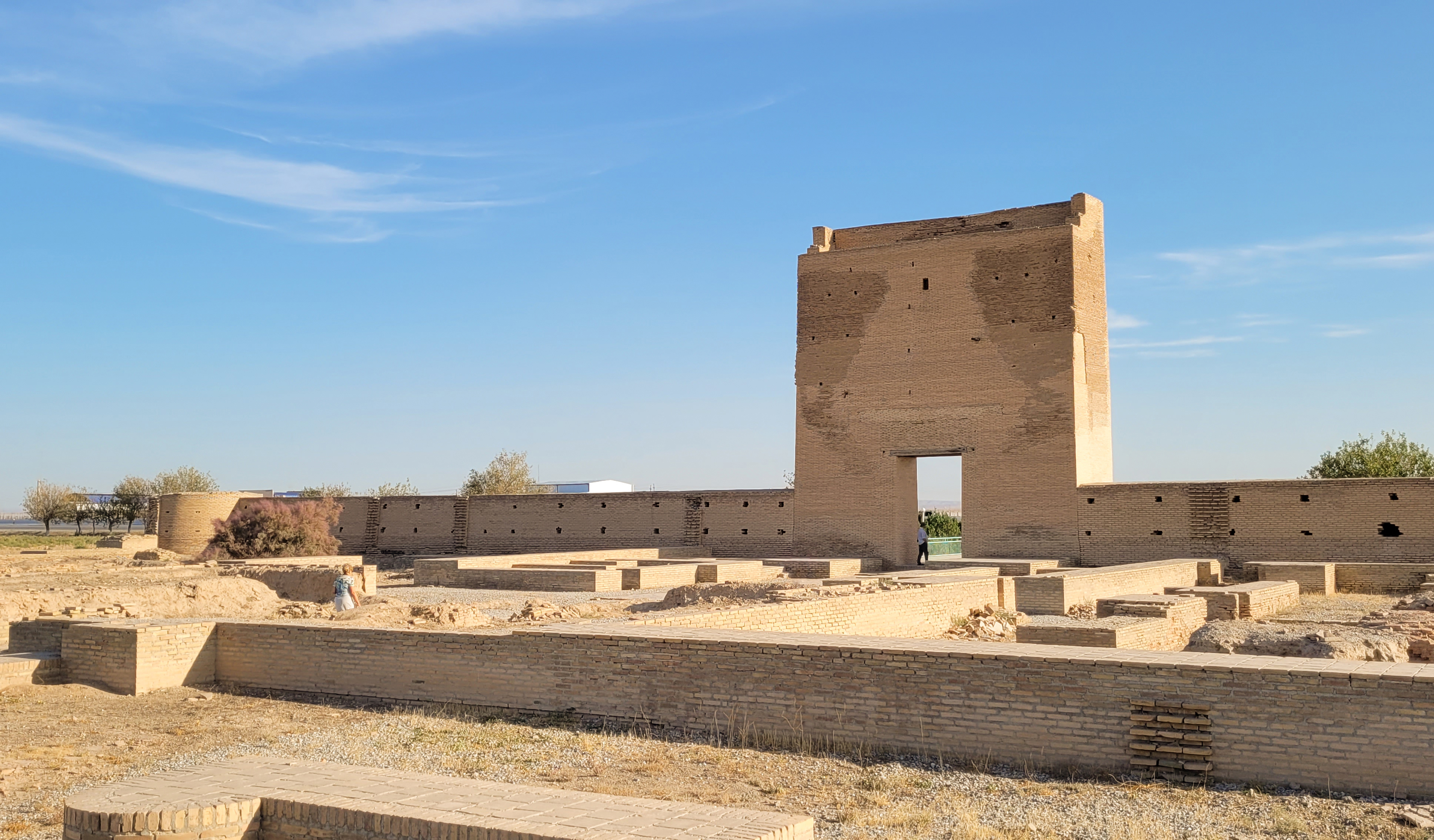
Courtyard of Rabati Malik

Rabat-i Mâlik holds a special place in the history of architecture. This is due to its impressive façade treatment of ornamental embedded cylindrical columns on the walls flanking the main entrance portal. The large, brick semi-columns were connected at the top by arches—a rare façade decor found on the flanking walls of the 2500-year-old Apadana palace at Persepolis, and at such Parthian and Sasanian monuments such as Firuzabad. The only other building of the Islamic period that contains such a treatment, is found on the minaret of Jarkurgan/Dzharkurgan in the neighbouring Surkhondaryo province of Uzbekistan.

Regrettably, except for the entrance portal that was badly damaged, the earthquake of 1968 totally demolished what was left of the rest of the rabat, including the landmark flanking walls with the semi-column decorations. Luckily, detailed monochrome photographs are available of the old flanking walls to document this landmark building and help with accurate restorations in the future.

The erection of the "Royal fortress" in the steppe, as established by a set of data, dates back to the end of the XI century, reconstruction to the XII century, functioning continued until the beginning of the XVIII century. The political history of the region of XI-XII centuries, was associated with the three Turkic Empires and dynasties of the Karakhanids, Ghaznavids and Seljukids, who ruled here with varying success and change of state borders throughout this time.

Rabat-i Malik ("Royal Fortress") is a Karakhanid palace-residence complex. Although historically classified as a caravanserai, scholarship identifies it as a fortified royal administrative center characterized by sophisticated and decorative design.

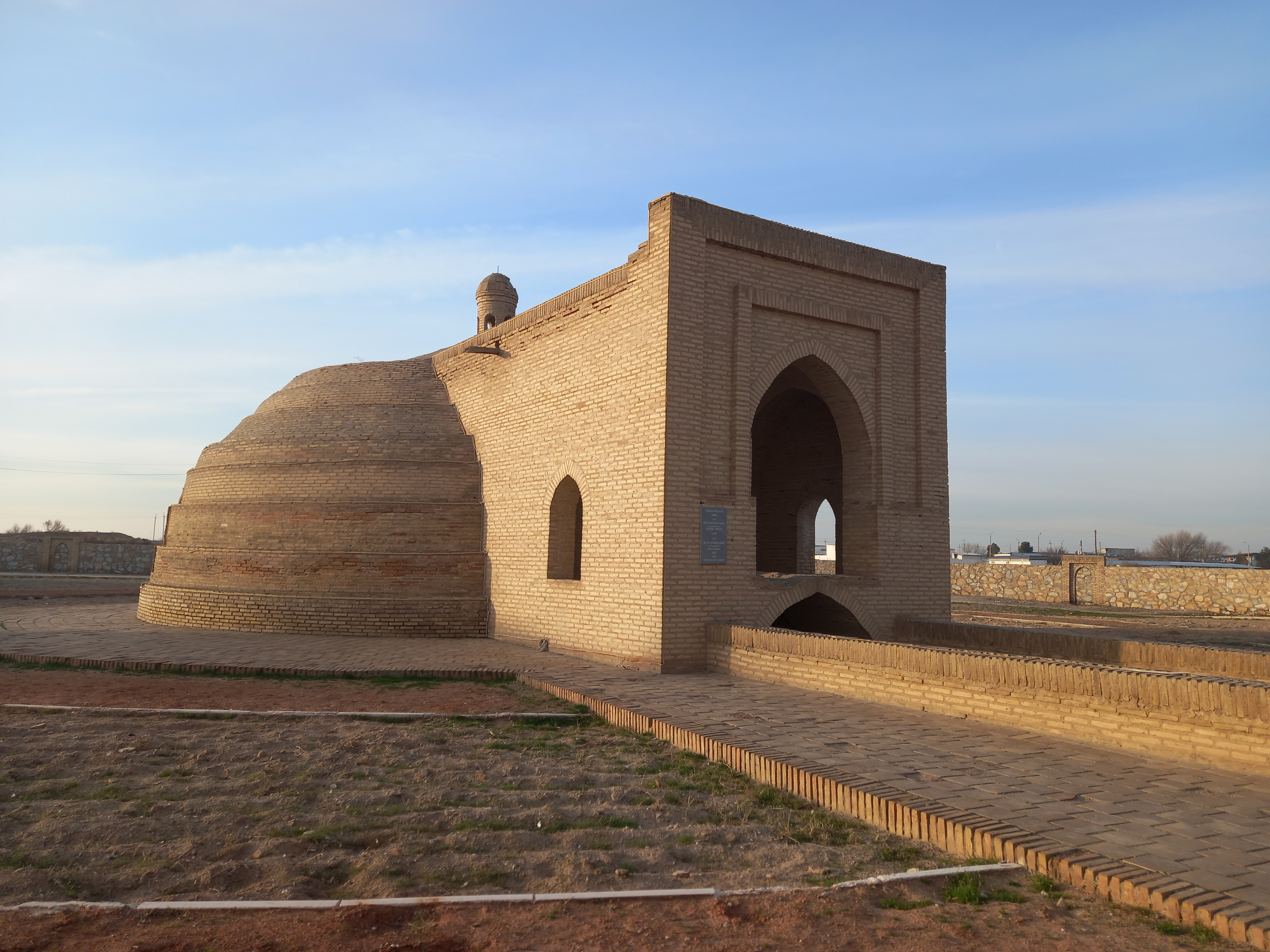
Sardoba Malik in front of the caravanserai

Only centuries later, after the Karakhanid dynasty fell from the historical arena in the early 13th century, and the Tatar-Mongol hordes with all the consequences of foreign conquest swept across the lands of Central Asia, this well-appointed "royal fortress", first ceased to be a dynastic residence, and then gradually turned into a roadside caravanserai, standing on the main Samarkand-Bukhara highway.

During its existence, the monument has undergone two major construction periods with complete reconstruction of some parts of the fortress and many minor repairs.

During the 19th and early 20th centuries, the ruins of Rabat-i Malik were dismantled for bricks by the inhabitants of the Malik settlement which was located opposite. In the 40s of the 20th century, the facing of the corrugated main facade was dismantled for bricks, the crude base of which was quickly eroded, and in the 1950s, during the construction of Navoiy city, an asphalt road was laid right in the middle of the inner part of Rabat-i Malik. The area adjacent to the road with the remains of the walls was "landscaped" - levelled with a bulldozer. This was the last drop in the destruction of the masterpiece of medieval architecture of Transoxiana of the pre-Mongol era.

== World Heritage Status ==
This site was added to the UNESCO World Heritage Tentative List on 18 January 2008, in the Cultural category. It was finally listed as a World Heritage Site in 2023 as part of the Silk Roads: Zarafshan-Karakum Corridor listing.

== History of research ==
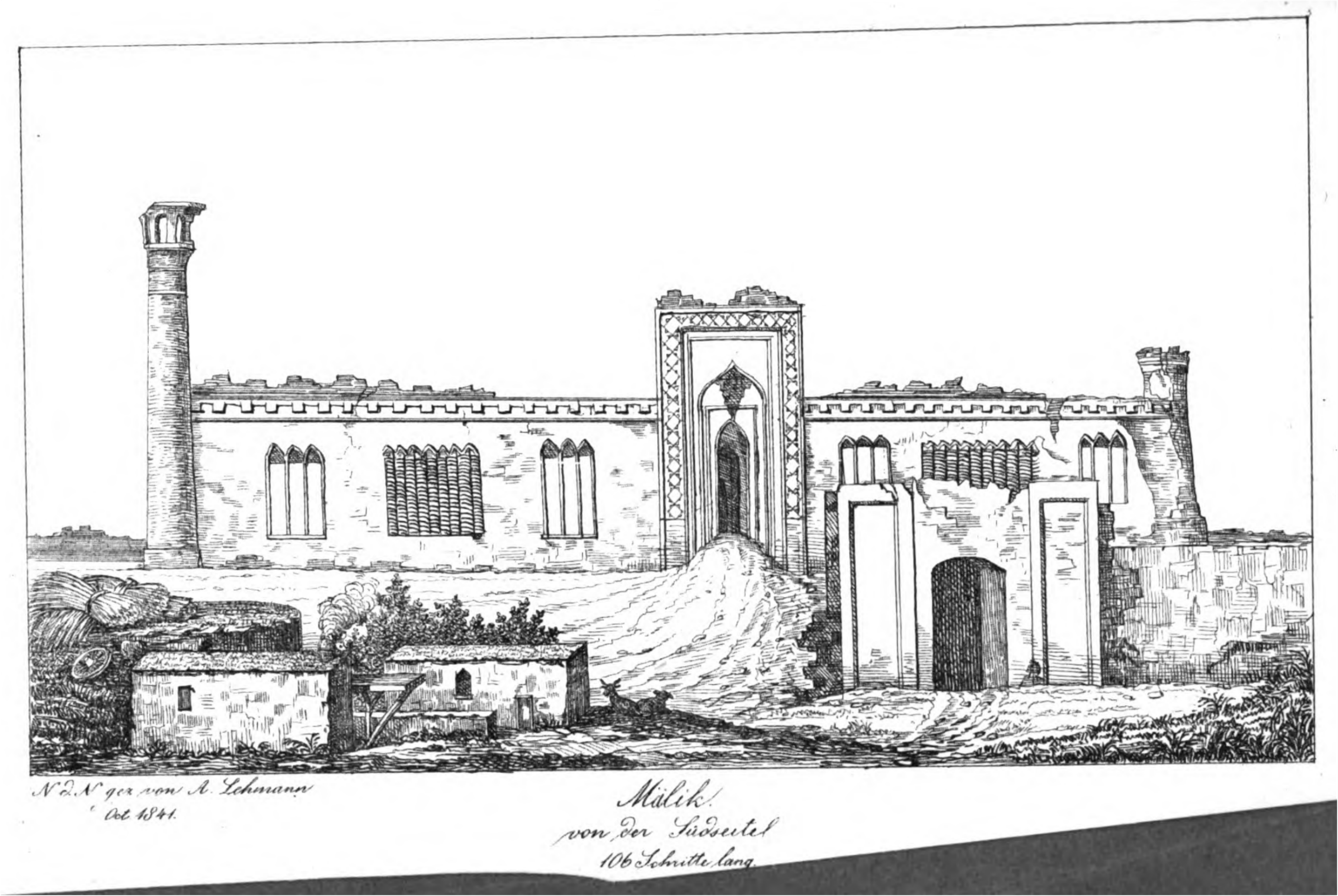
An image of Raboti Malik and nearby buildings by Alexander Lehmann in 1841 (early depiction of the Raboti Malik Caravanserai)

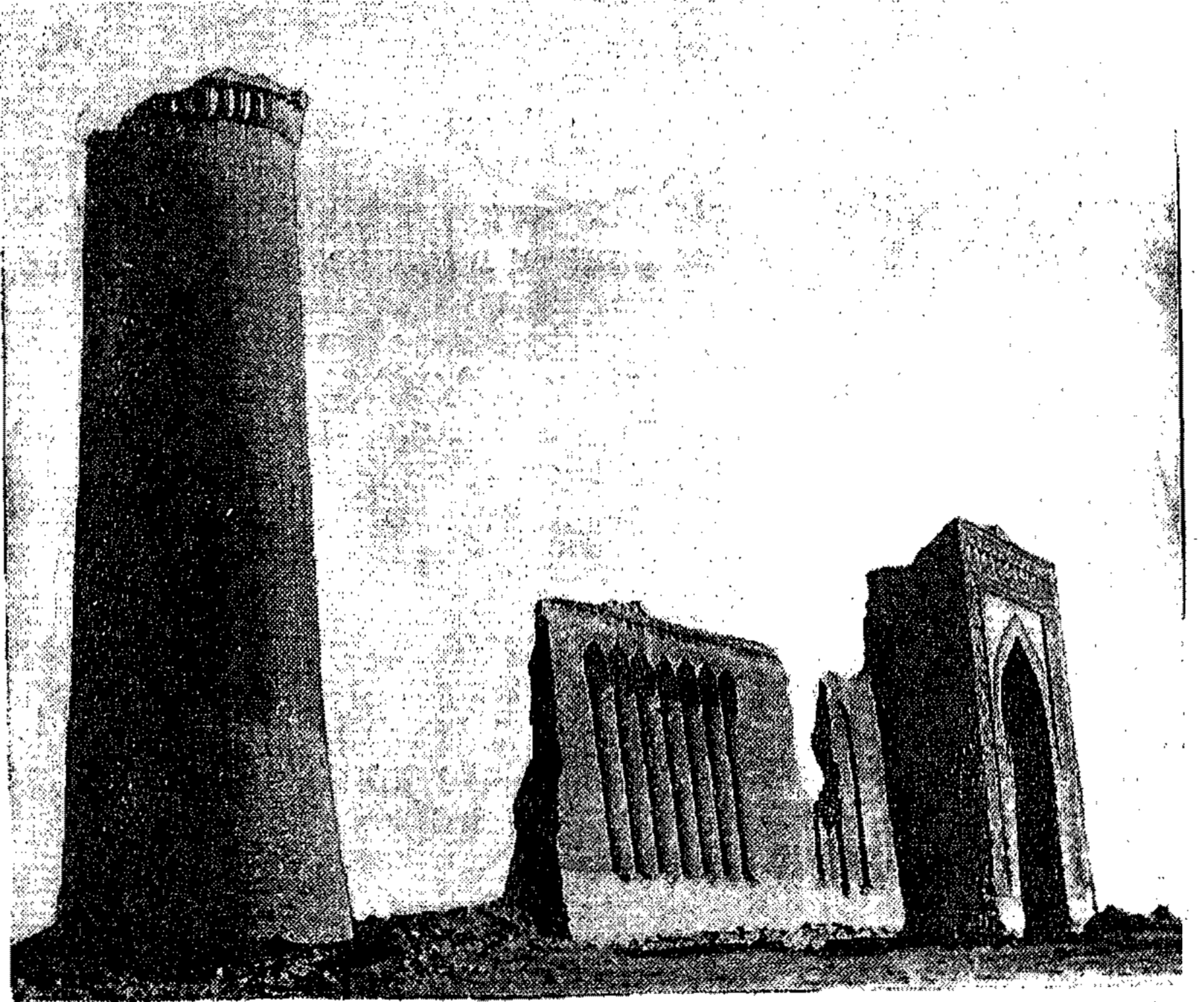
A picture of the Rabati Malik Caravanserai taken before 1935

In 1841-42, the Caravanserai Rabati Malik was explored by an expedition led by engineers Butenev and Bogoslovsky. The expedition also began to write the first scientific books dedicated to this structure. The first and relatively comprehensive description of the building was compiled by the naturalist Alexander Leman. Leman also created sketches of the external appearance of the building. From these sketches, it is evident that the southern facade is well-preserved and framed by an external wall with an arched entrance. Another participant in the expedition was the orientalist Nikolay Khanikov, who provided a brief description of the building.

During the Soviet period, Rabati Malik underwent comprehensive research. The studies conducted by Ivan Umnyakov and Boris Zasipkin. Umnyakov's research includes a series of historical details about Rabati Malik and highlights the challenges in studying the architecture of the Khorezmshah era. Zasipkin's research is dedicated to the archaeology of art and the key elements of Rabati Malik's structure.

The work of these two scholars subsequently became the basis for many other scientific studies, including those by Boris Denike and Boris Veimar, as well as professors L. Voronin, V. Voronin, and T. Stramsov.

In the latter half of the 20th century, an archaeological expedition was carried out, during which the first information about the internal infrastructure and composition of Rabati Malik was obtained. Engineer Krasilnikov conducted measurements that allowed for the determination of proportions and scale. According to Zasipkin's measurements, the width of the arched is 12.03 meters, and the height is 12 meters. The width of the entrance arch is 5.73 meters, the thickness is 1.43 meters, and the wall height is approximately 12 meters.

For a long time, it was believed that Rabati Malik was built in 1078-79, as indicated by Bartold. However, in 1951, A. Semyonov found evidence that another caravanserai was constructed in the 11th century near Samarkand. This fact casts doubt on the dating of the construction of Rabati Malik.

On the territory of Rabati Malik, archaeological investigations were conducted in 1937–1940, 1973–1977, 1997, 1999, and 2001. As a result of these studies, information about the history of Rabati Malik, the time of its construction, architectural features of the internal parts, and numerous artifacts (ceramics, metal, and decorations, including valuables and coins from various years) were found. Beneath the surface layer of the earth, the remains of square-shaped walls, typical of palace structures, were discovered, along with numerous fragments of schematic drawings. The residential area was in the north, adorned with drawings, while the south held trading spaces. Water was supplied to Rabati Malik through tunnels starting from Sardoba.

== Deterioration period ==
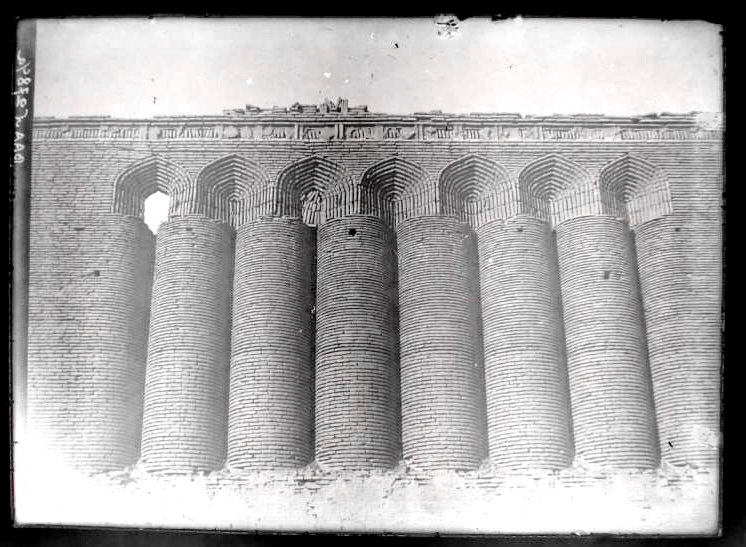
Walls of Rabati Malik. Photo from 1925(Currently not saved)

At the end of the 19th century and into the 20th century, the Rabati Malik caravanserais continued to deteriorate. In 1875, one of the two minarets on the southern facade collapsed, leaving only the western minaret standing. According to findings from 1911, the central dome with the dome was also in a state of disrepair. In 1924, the right side of the southern facade collapsed.

In the 1950s of the 20th century, the central part of Rabati Malik caravanserai and its cistern was demolished to make way for an asphalt road (M-37), leading to the loss of the urban fabric of the area. After the road was built, the local residents began using the fallen stones from the southern wall as building materials.

== See also ==
- Ribat, Arabic word for Early Muslim frontier fort, later caravansary and Sufi retreat
