= Shams al-Mulk Nasr =

Karakhanid ruler in Transoxiana from 1068 to 1080

- Ruler of Transoxiana
- Reign: 1068 – 1080
- Successor: Khizr Khan
- Died: 1080; Transoxiana
- Consort: Aysha Khatun
- Dynasty: Karakhanid dynasty
- Father: Ibrahim Tamgach Khan
- Religion: Sunni Islam

Shams al-Mulk Nasr was a Karakhanid ruler in Transoxiana from 1068 to 1080. He was one of the greatest rulers of the dynasty.

== Biography ==
Map of Khurasan, Transoxiana and Tokharistan

He was the son of Böritigin, a Karakhanid ruler from the western branch of the family, known as the "Alids", which was named after their ancestor Ali Arslan Khan.

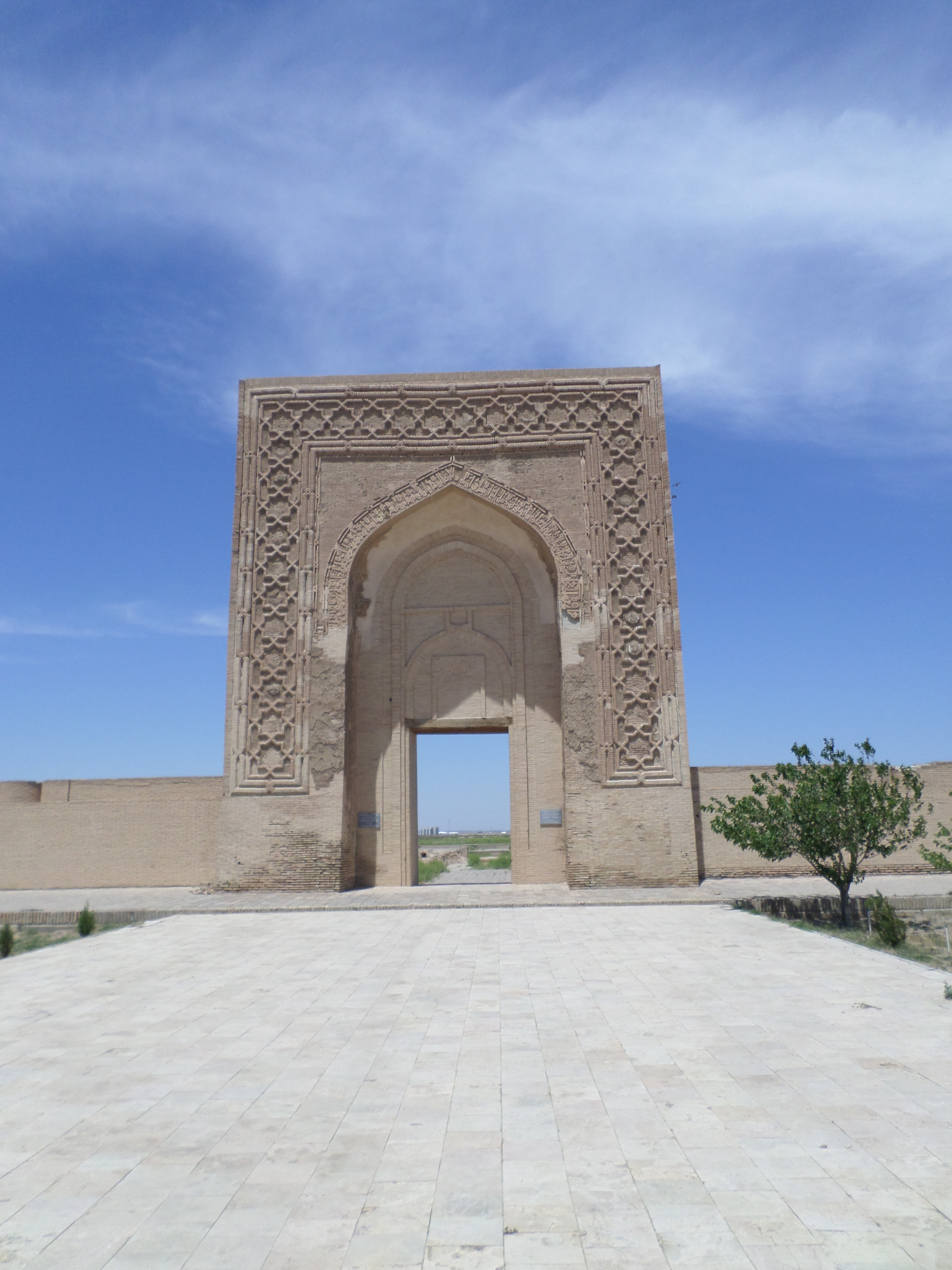
Rabati Malik's portal

Shams al-Mulk is known for building in the Zerafshan valley. Shams al-Mulk built the palace and gardens of Shamsabad in Bukhara where the Karakhanids later lived. The palace was located southwest of the Magok-i-Attari Mosque, outside Bukhara. Shams al-Mulk was the first ruler of the city to build a royal residence outside the rabad of the city, on the site of the current Namazgah.

One of the most important Karakhanid structures, most of which have survived to the beginning of the 20th century, is Rabati Malik, a caravanserai ruin located in Navoiy, 110 km northeast of Bukhara on the road to Samarkand. The complex was greatly expanded in 1078–1079 by Shams al-Mulk.

During the reign of Shams al-Mulk Omar Khayyam was invited to Samarkand.

Shams al-Mulk died in 1080 and was succeeded by his brother Khizr Khan.

== Sources ==
- Bosworth, C. E. (1975). "The early Ghaznavids". In Frye, R. N. (ed.). The Cambridge History of Iran, Volume 4: From the Arab Invasion to the Saljuqs. Cambridge: Cambridge University Press. pp. 162–198. ISBN 0-521-20093-8.
- Davidovich, E. A. (1996). "The Karakhanids". History of Civilizations of Central Asia, Volume III: The Crossroads of Civilizations: A.D. 250 to 750. Paris: UNESCO. pp. 119–145. ISBN 92-3-103211-9.
- Bosworth, C. E. (1968). "The Political and Dynastic History of the Iranian World (A.D. 1000–1217)". In Frye, R. N. (ed.). The Cambridge History of Iran, Volume 5: The Saljuq and Mongol periods. Cambridge: Cambridge University Press. pp. 1–202. ISBN 0-521-06936-X.
- Kochnev B.D. Numizmaticheskaya istoriya Karakhanidskogo kaganata (991—1209 gg.). Moskva «Sofiya», 2006.
- McClary, Richard Piran. Medieval Monuments of Central Asia: Qarakhanid Architecture of the 11th and 12th Centuries. Edinburgh University Press, 2020.
