= Deggaron Mosque =

Mosque in Uzbekistan

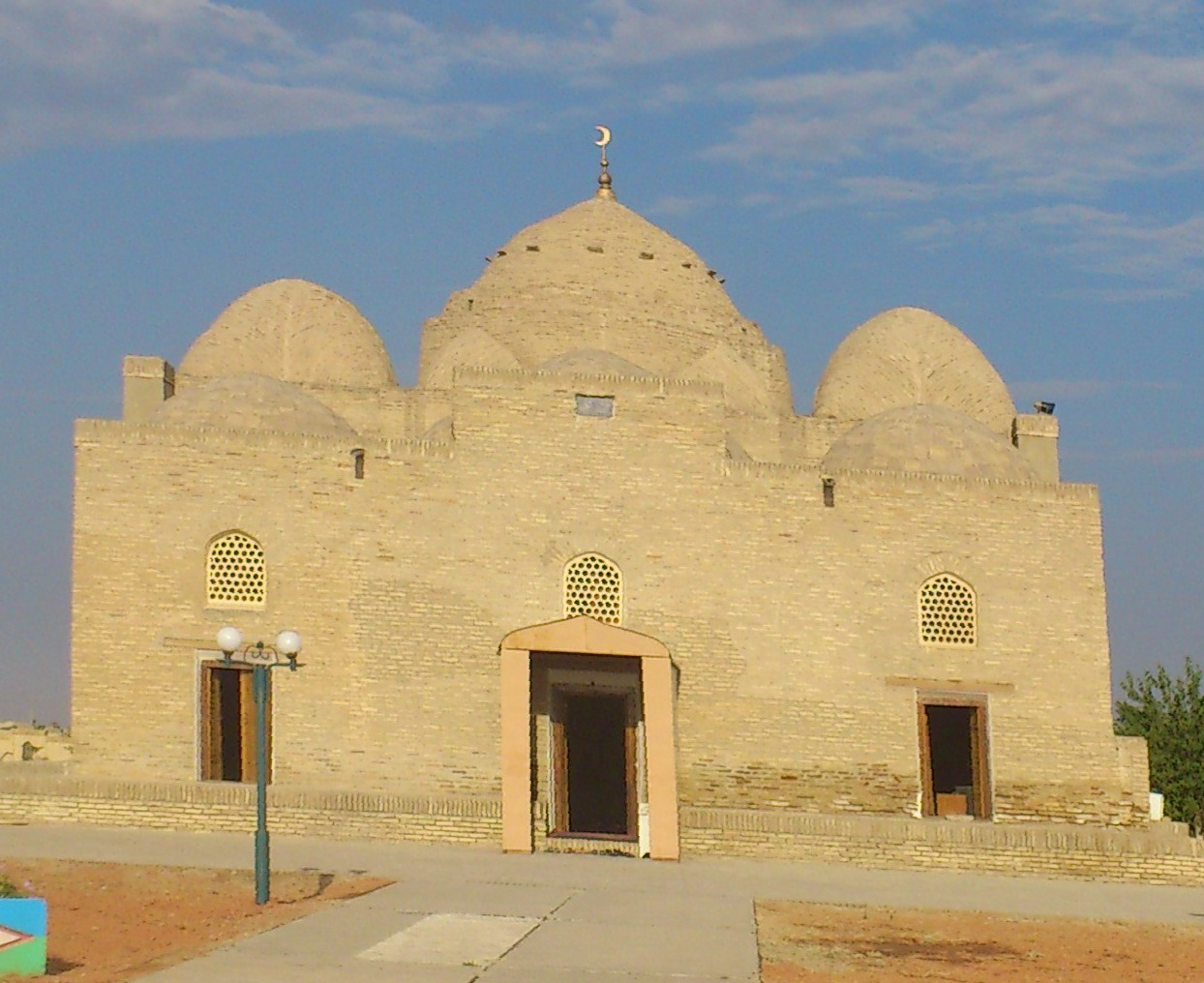

Religion
- Region: Navoiy Region

Location
- Country: Uzbekistan
- Interactive map of Deggaron Mosque
- Coordinates: 40°09′19″N 65°00′39″E

Architecture
- Established: c. 8th – 12th centuries

Deggaron Mosque (Uzbek: Deggaron masjidi) is an architectural monument in the Navoiy Region of Uzbekistan, one of the earliest surviving religious buildings in the country. It was constructed between the 8th and 12th centuries and is noted for a unique architectural style.

The exact date of the construction of the mosque is uncertain, but it is commonly estimated to have been made in the 11th or 12th centuries, although some estimate earlier in the 8th or 9th centuries. It was constructed by Karakhanids and was located in a fortified village which was later abandoned in a drought. It is noted for a unique architectural style not typical in Islamic construction; the mosque has more similarities to Zoroastrian architecture and also has characteristics of early Christian churches with four pillars and a domed center.

The 1946 Penjikent expedition by A. Yu. Yakubovsky discovered the mosque and determined that it was constructed on top of an earlier building. Its name, "Deggaron", refers to pottery which thrived in the region in the Middle Ages. It was restored and continues to operate. The site has been considered for inclusion as a UNESCO World Heritage Site and is maintained by the Government of Uzbekistan.
