= Qobul Tursunov =

Qobul Beknazarovich Tursunov

Governor of Navoiy Region
- In office 25.12.2016–08.11.2021
- President: Shavkat Mirziyoyev
- Preceded by: Erkinjon Turdimov
- Succeeded by: Normat Tursunov

Personal details
- Born: 30 March 1964 (age 60)

Qobul Beknazarovich Tursunov (born 1964, Navoiy District, Uzbek SSR, SSSR) is an Uzbek economist and statesman. Governor of Nurota District and chairman of budget and the chairman of the Committee on Budget and Economic Reforms of the Senate of the Oliy Majlis. From December 25, 2016 to 2021, he worked as the governor of Navoi region. In 2015, he was elected to the Senate of the Oliy Majlis of the Republic of Uzbekistan of the III convocation.

== Biography ==
Born in 1964 in Navoiy District of Buxoro Region (now located in Navoiy Region).

- In 1993, he graduated from the Navoi branch of Tashkent State Technical University, in 2004 from Bukhara State University, and in 2005 from State and Society Building Academy.
- 2015-2021 — Member of the Senate of the Oliy Majlis of the Republic of Uzbekistan.
- 2016-2021 — Governor of Navoiy Region
