= Qizilcha =

- Location in Uzbekistan
- Coordinates: 40°43′46″N 66°6′32″E
- Country: Uzbekistan
- Region: Navoiy Region
- District: Nurota District

Population (2016)
  - Total: 3,400

Qizilcha is an urban-type settlement in northern-central Uzbekistan. It is located in Nurota District, Navoiy Region. The district town Nurota lies 40 km to the southwest. As of 2016, its population is 3,400.
