= Akkula =

Akkula Ak-Kulya
- Location in Uzbekistan
- Coordinates: 40°33′0″N 65°57′0″E
- Country: Uzbekistan
- Region: Navoiy Region
- District: Nurata District

Akkula, alternate names being Ak-Kul' and Ak-Kulya, is a locality in Nurata District, Navoiy Region of Uzbekistan. The settlement in within the relative vicinity of Aydar Lake.
