= Erkinjon Turdimov =

Uzbekistani politician

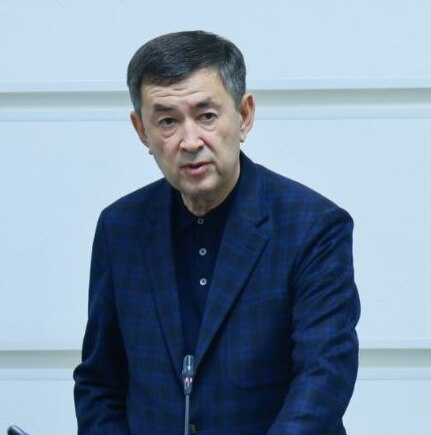

Governor of Samarqand Region
- Incumbent
- Assumed office 11.07.2018
- President: Shavkat Mirziyoyev
- Prime Minister: Abdulla Aripov
- Preceded by: Turobjon Jo'rayev

Governor of Surkhandarya Region
- In office 20.12.2016–11.07.2018
- President: Shavkat Mirziyoyev
- Prime Minister: Abdulla Aripov
- Preceded by: Tojimurod Mamaraimov
- Succeeded by: Bahodir Po'latov

Governor of Navoiy Region
- In office 12.12.2008–20.12.2016
- President: Islom Karimov; Shavkat Mirziyoyev
- Prime Minister: Shavkat Mirziyoyev; Abdulla Aripov
- Preceded by: Bahriddin Ro'ziyev
- Succeeded by: Qobul Tursunov

Personal details
- Born: July 10, 1969 (age 57) Samarqand Region, Uzbek SSR

Turdimov Erkinjon Aqbotayevich (Uzbek: Turdimov Erkinjon Aqbotayevich; July 10, 1969, Koshrabot District, Samarkand Region) is a member of the Foreign Policy Committee of the Senate of the Oliy Majlis of the Republic of Uzbekistan (since 2008). Governor of Navoi region. In 2016, he was appointed to the governorship of Surkhandarya region. Since 2018, the governor of Samarkand region. Governor of Samarkand region Erkin Turdimov was awarded the medal of the Ministry of Afghanistan. The medal was handed over by the Minister of Irshad, Hajj and Waqf Affairs of the Islamic Republic of Afghanistan Muhammad Qasim Halimi.

== Education ==
In 1991, he graduated from the Tashkent Institute of National Economy, majoring in economics.

== Career ==
In 1991–1995, department specialist at the Syrdaryo branch of "Uzsanoatqurilishbank", chief specialist in the money circulation department of "Uzsanoatqurilishbank" Zarafshan branch, deputy head of the department, manager of the Zarafshan branch, in 1995–1996, deputy mayor of Zarafshan, in 1996–2000 Uzbekistan the manager of the Navoi branch of the National Bank, in 2000–2008 the governor of the Xatirchi district of the Navoi region, in 2008 - the first deputy minister of agriculture and water management of the Republic of Uzbekistan, since 2008 - a member of the Foreign Policy Committee of the Senate of the Oliy Majlis of the Republic of Uzbekistan. Erkinjon Turdimov was the governor of Navoi region in 2008–2016, deputy of the Council of People's Deputies of Navoi region in 2009–2016, governor of Surkhandarya region in 2016–2018, governor of Samarkand region since 2018. is working in his role. Erkinjon Turdimov was the governor of Navoi region in 2008–2016, In 2009–2016, he was a deputy of the Council of People's Deputies of Navoi region, in 2016–2018 he was the governor of Surkhandarya region, Since 2018, the governor of Samarkand region.

== Awards ==
In 2006, E. Turdimov was awarded the "Mehnat shuhrati".

== Public appearances ==
Erkinjon Turdimov is in the media's attention from time to time. In particular, in 2018, he proposed to punish the leaders who made false reports.

All teams have staffs of guards, cleaners, drivers and other technical staff. Although their service is important, they are not given enough attention. Since the salary is very low, the people of this profession come to the office only in name, they do not work seriously. In many communities, there is no opportunity for them to work and rest in decent conditions, funds are not allocated for work tools and special clothes. People in this category are often overlooked during holiday promotions. It would be expedient if the leaders of the organizations, the primary organizations of the trade union pay special attention to these issues at the beginning of the year and think seriously.

— Erkinjon Turdimov,

In 2019, E. Turdimov also spoke about the fact that secret agreements in construction lead to corruption. In 2020, as part of the promotion of a healthy lifestyle in the Samarkand region, he called on all leaders in the region to walk to work for 10 days.
