= Malikrabot =

- urban-type settlement
- Location in Uzbekistan
- Coordinates: 40°07′40″N 65°10′45″E
- Country: Uzbekistan
- Region: Navoiy Region
- District: Karmana District
- Urban-type settlement status: 1954

Population (1989)
  - Total: 5,055
- Time zone: UTC+5 (UZT)

Malikrabot (Uzbek: Malikrabot, Маликработ, Russian: Маликрабат) is an urban-type settlement in Navoiy Region, Uzbekistan. It is part of Karmana District. The population in 1989 was 5055 people.
