= Okzhetpes mine =

Gold mine in Navoiy, Uzbekistan

- Location: Navoiy Province, Uzbekistan
- Products: Gold, Silver

The Okzhetpes mine is one of the largest gold mines in Uzbekistan and in the world. The mine is located in Navoiy Province. The mine has estimated reserves of 25 million oz of gold and 22.4 million oz of silver.
