= Mausoleum of Sheikh Khoja Khisrav =

Pilgrimage site in Navoiy, Uzbekistan

Coordinates: 40°7′40.5″N 65°21′48.0″E

- Shayx Xoʻja Xisrav maqbarasi (Uzbek)
- Interactive map of Mausoleum of Sheikh Khoja Khisrav
- Location: Karmana District, Navoiy Region, Uzbekistan
- Nearest city: Navoiy

History
- Built for: Mausoleum
- Demolished: 20th century

The mausoleum of Sheikh Khoja Khisrav is a pilgrimage site located in the Karmana District of Navoiy Region. This pilgrimage site has been included in the national list of intangible cultural heritage objects of Uzbekistan.

== History ==
Khoja Khisrav was a saint who lived during the 14th century, alongside Mawlana Orif Deggaroni and Khwaja Bakhouddin. Information about the life, activities, and miracles of Khoja Khisrav can be found in the book "Bahouddin Balogardon" by Abul Musin Muhammad Boqir Ibn Muhammad Ali. He was recognized as a prominent figure in his era, a spiritual leader, and a possessor of miracles in the Islamic faith. He is buried to the southwest of the Qosim Shaykh mausoleum, approximately 400 meters away. This small mausoleum is enclosed on one side by a canal and on the other side by private houses. The mausoleum area is surrounded by a beautiful metal fence. The building itself is a single-domed structure with an entrance portal, and a rectangular perimeter, constructed from exposed bricks, adorned with colorful, partly engraved, glazed tiles. The interior is quite spacious, featuring a symbolic marble tombstone with Arabic calligraphy in the central alcove of the dome.

The mausoleum of Sheikh Khisrav was renovated in the 20th century. In place of the original mausoleum, only the burial site of Khoja Khisrav remains, and a new mausoleum made from modern materials has been installed on top of it. The sacred pilgrimage site, the "Khoja Khisrav" memorial, located in the Karmana District, has undergone reconstruction and has been made accessible for public use. After the restoration of the Khoja Khisrav pilgrimage site, it acquired an entirely new appearance.
