= Nuratau Mountains =

Mountain range in Uzbekistan

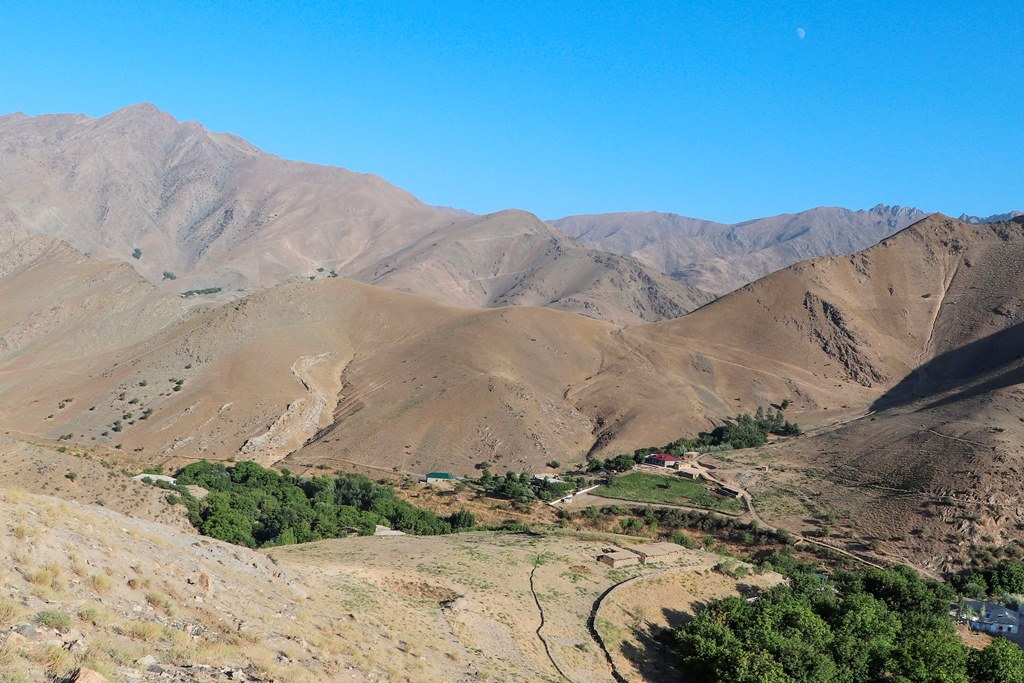
- Nuratau mountains and the Sentob valley

Highest point
- Elevation: 2,169 m (7,116 ft)
- Coordinates: 40°30′00.0″N 66°42′00.0″E

Naming
- Native name: Нуратау (Russian); Nurota togʻlari (Uzbek)

Geography
- Location within Uzbekistan
- Location: Uzbekistan

The Nuratau Mountains (Uzbek: Nurota tog'lari, Russian: Нурата́у or Нурати́нский хребе́т) is a mountain range located in Uzbekistan and constitutes one of the western buttresses of the Gissar Range. It borders Aydar Lake to the north, the town of Nurata to the west, the Kyzylkum Desert to the south, and the Sanzar river to the east. Stretching over 170 km in east–west direction it culminates in the 2169 m Mount Zargar.

== Geography and environment ==
=== Geology ===
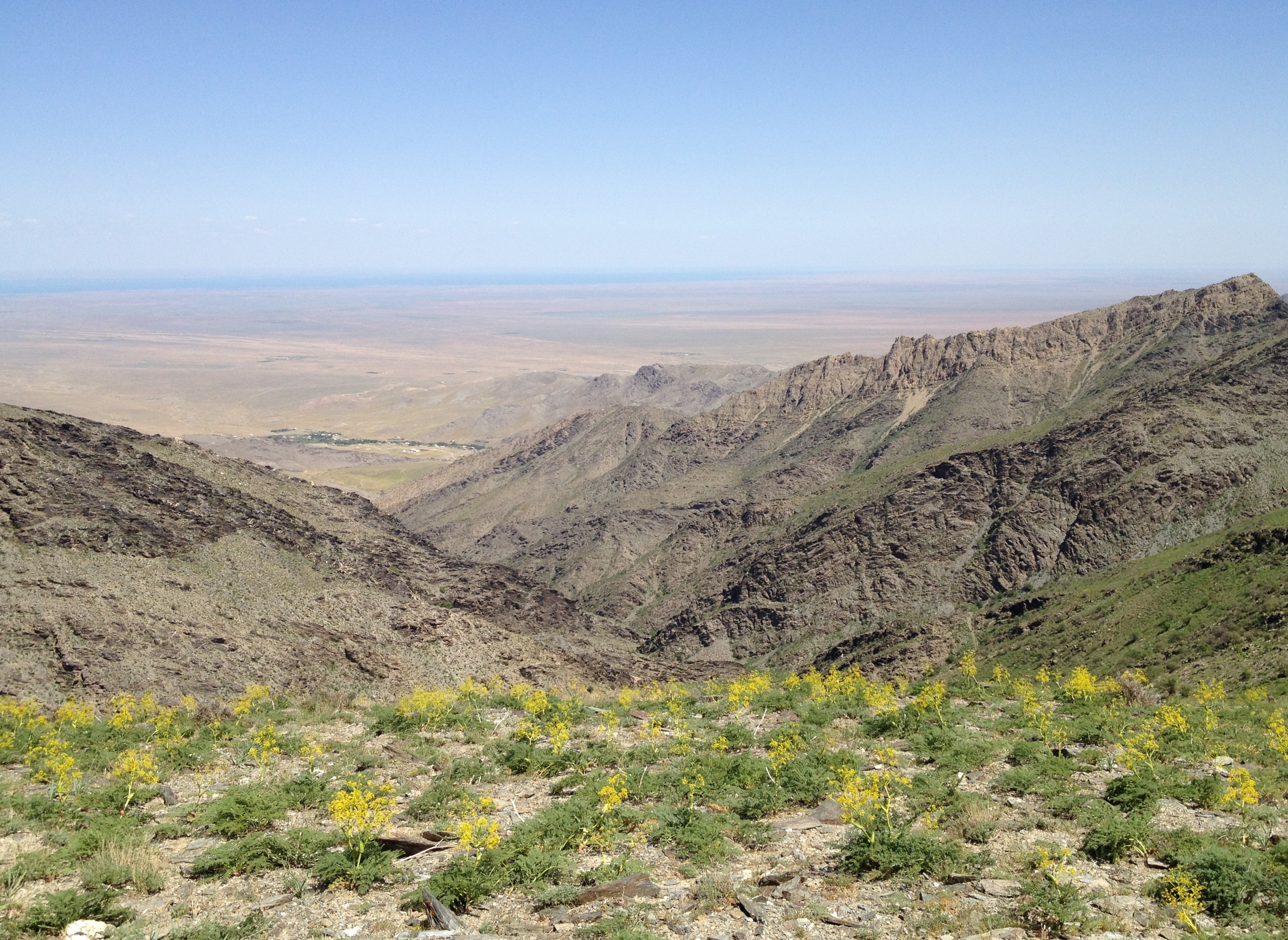
Nuratau Mountains and Aydar lake

The range is composed chiefly of sandstone and limestone. It has a flat crest, a steep and rocky northern slope, and a gentle southern slope.

=== Important Bird Area ===
The range has been designated an Important Bird Area (IBA) by BirdLife International because it supports breeding populations of Egyptian and cinereous vultures, saker falcons, eastern rock nuthatches, white-throated robins, variable wheatears and white-capped buntings.

=== Nuratau-Kyzylkum Biosphere Reserve ===
The Nuratau-Kyzylkum Biosphere Reserve (NKBR) was established "to conserve the globally important biodiversity, landscapes and cultural assets of the Nuratau Mountain Range and the adjacent Kyzylkum Desert". The Reserve is said to be the only place in the world where the endangered Severtsov wild sheep (Ovis ammon severtzovi) still roam in the wild. It has also an endemic collection of unique flora and a diverse spread of nut and fruit trees, including strands of pistachio and rare walnut.
