= Navbahor District =

Coordinates: 40°13′12″N 65°18′11″E

- District
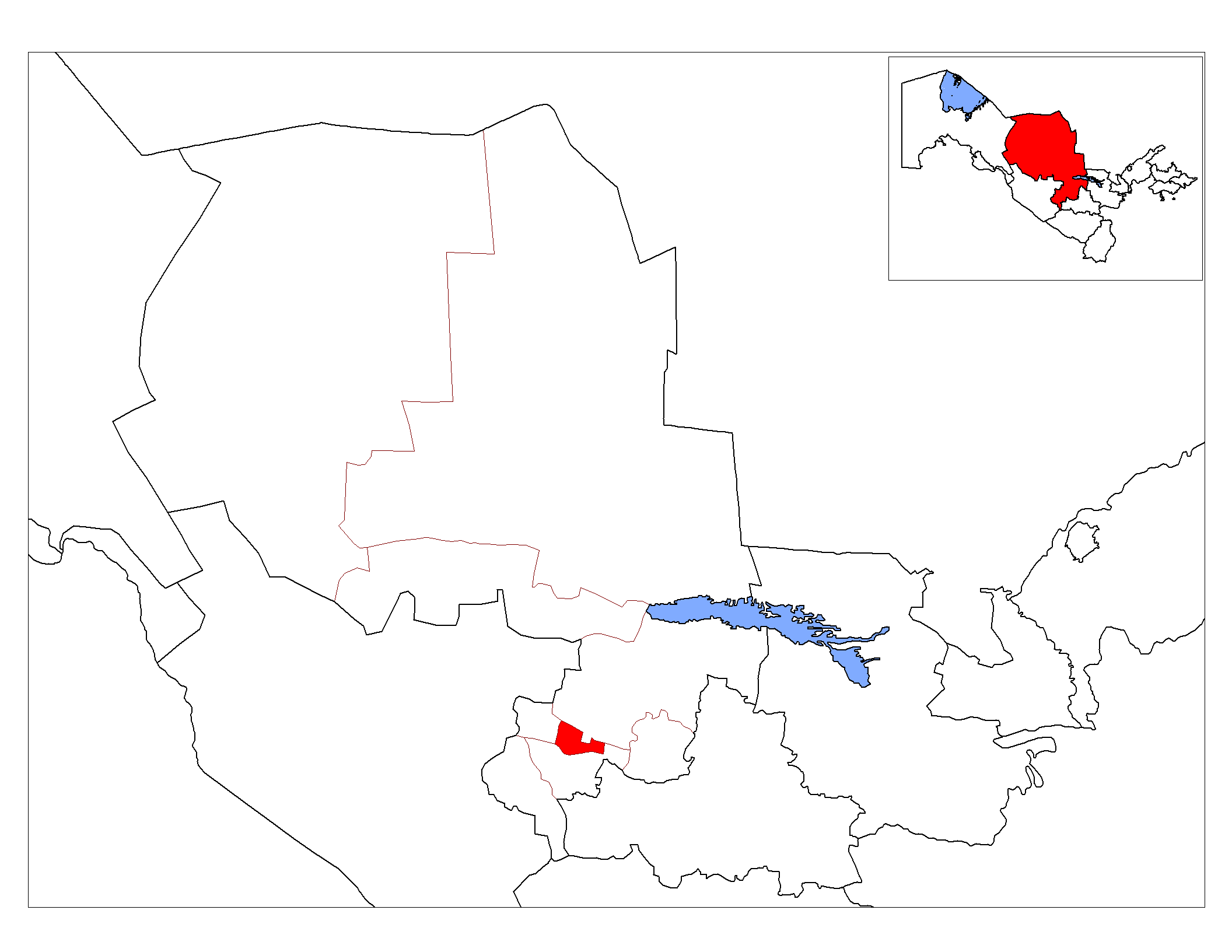
- Country: Uzbekistan
- Region: Navoiy Region
- Capital: Beshrabot

Area
  - Total: 1,570 km^{2} (610 sq mi)

Population (2021)
  - Total: 114,700
  - Density: 73.1/km^{2} (189/sq mi)
- Time zone: UTC+5 (UZT)

Navbahor District (Uzbek: Navbahor tumani) is a district of Navoiy Region in Uzbekistan. The capital is in Beshrabot. It has an area of 1,570 km^{2} (610 sq mi) and its population is 114,700 (2021 est.). The district consists of 5 urban-type settlements (Kalkonota, Saroy, Quyi Beshrabot, Keskanterak, Ijant) and 7 rural communities (including Beshrabot).

Navbahor origins from Persian word Now-Bahaar (New-Spring) which means early spring.
