= Tomdi District =

Coordinates: 41.7545°N 64.6294°E

- District
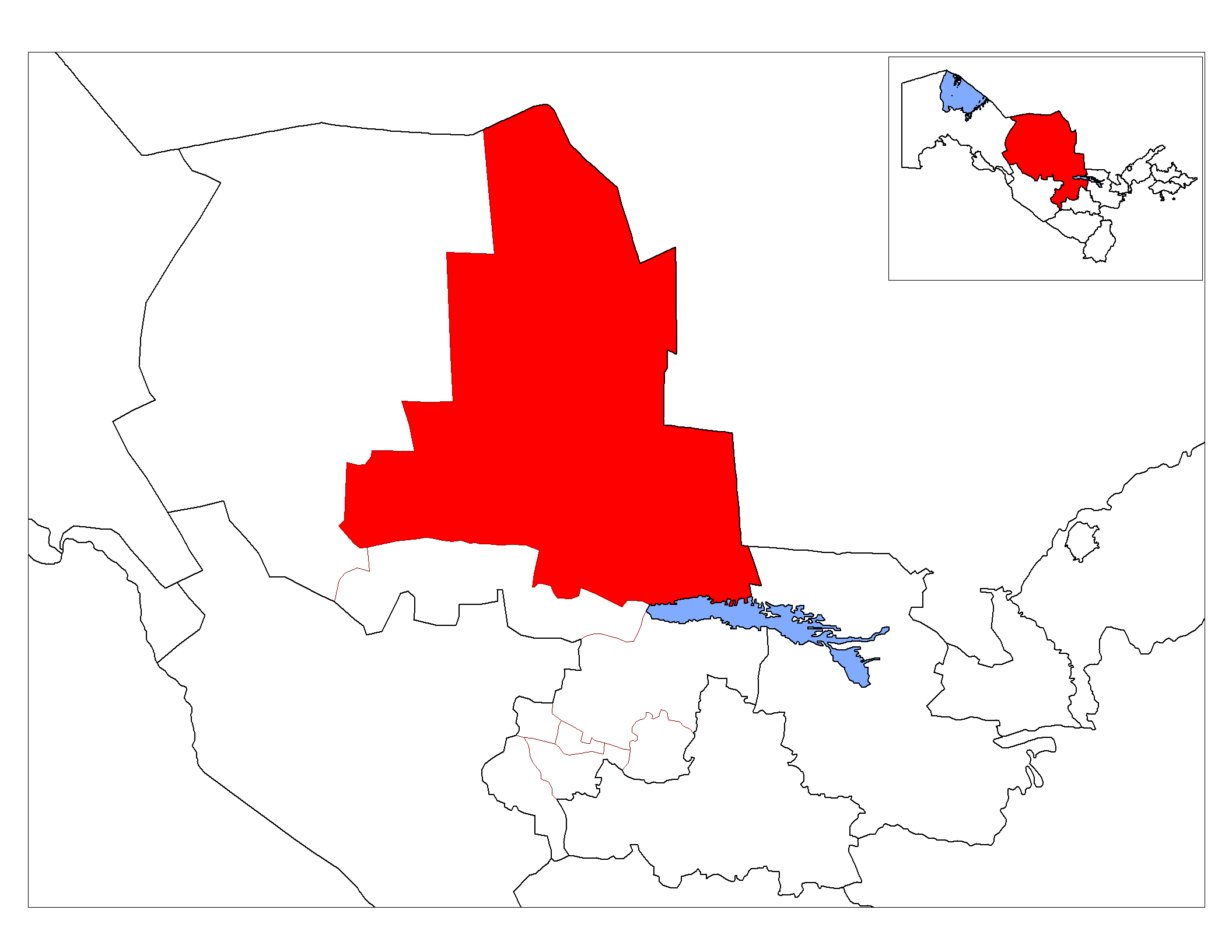
- Country: Uzbekistan
- Region: Navoiy Region
- Capital: Tomdibuloq

Area
  - Total: 42,490 km^{2} (16,410 sq mi)

Population (2021)
  - Total: 15,100
  - Density: 0.355/km^{2} (0.920/sq mi)
- Time zone: UTC+5 (UZT)

Tomdi District (Uzbek: Tomdi tumani) is a district of Navoiy Region in Uzbekistan. The capital lies at the town Tomdibuloq. It has an area of 42,490 km^{2} (16,410 sq mi) and its population is 15,100 (2021 est.). The district consists of one urban-type settlements (Tomdibuloq) and 7 rural communities.

The city of Zarafshon is within the boundaries of Tomdi District, but is not part of it, instead being independent from it.
