= Qiziltepa District =

Coordinates: 40.036027°N 64.850235°E

- District
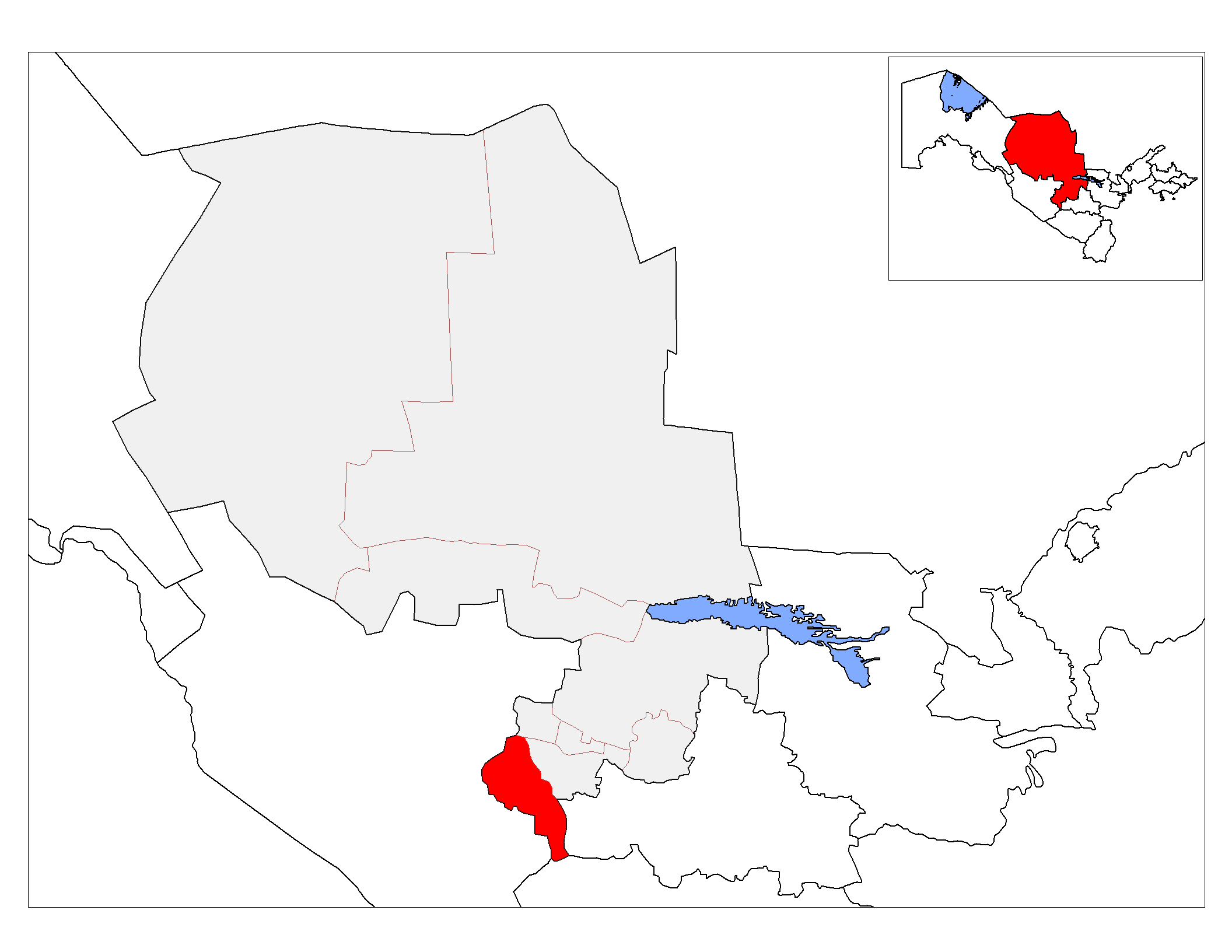
- Country: Uzbekistan
- Region: Navoiy Region
- Capital: Qiziltepa

Area
  - Total: 2,190 km^{2} (850 sq mi)

Population (2021)
  - Total: 153,900
  - Density: 70.3/km^{2} (182/sq mi)
- Time zone: UTC+5 (UZT)

Qiziltepa District (Uzbek: Qiziltepa tumani) is a district of Navoiy Region in Uzbekistan. The capital lies at the city Qiziltepa. It has an area of 2,190 km^{2} (850 sq mi) and its population is 153,900 (2021 est.). The district consists of one city (Qiziltepa), 12 urban-type settlements (Husbuddin, Qalayn-Azizon, Baland Gʻardiyon, Gʻoyibon, Oq soch, Vangʻozi, Oqmachit, Zarmitan (Town), Gʻamxoʻr, Uzilishkent, Oʻrtaqoʻrgʻon, Xoʻjaqoʻrgʻon) and 8 rural communities.
