= Uchquduq District =

Coordinates: 42°09′N 63°33′E

- District
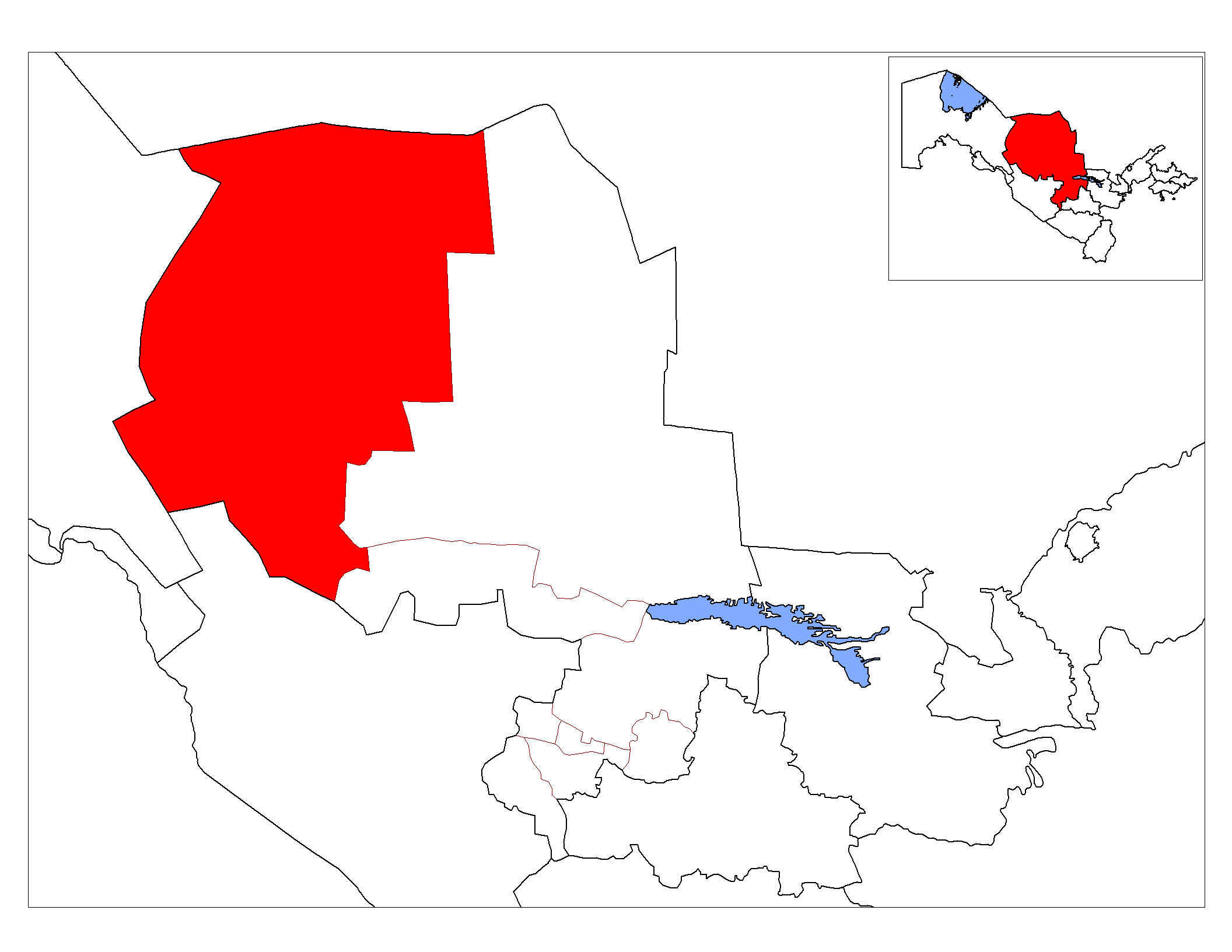
- Country: Uzbekistan
- Region: Navoiy Region
- Capital: Uchquduq

Area
  - Total: 46,630 km^{2} (18,000 sq mi)

Population (2021)
  - Total: 37,700
  - Density: 0.808/km^{2} (2.09/sq mi)
- Time zone: UTC+5 (UZT)

Uchquduq District is a district of Navoiy Region in Uzbekistan. The capital lies at the city Uchquduq. It has an area of 46,630 km^{2} (18,000 sq mi) and its population is 37,700 (2021 est.). The district consists of one city (Uchquduq), one urban-type settlement (Shalxar) and 5 rural communities.
