= Qiziltepa =

Qiziltepa Qiziltepa Қизилтепа
- City
- Location in Uzbekistan
- Coordinates: 40°02′10″N 64°51′01″E
- Country: Uzbekistan
- Region: Navoiy Region
- District: Qiziltepa District
- Urban-type settlement status: 1979

Population (2016)
  - Total: 12,200
- Time zone: UTC+5 (UZT)

Qiziltepa (sometimes spelled Kyzyltepa; Uzbek: Qiziltepa, Қизилтепа, قىزىلتېپه; Russian: Кызылтепа, romanized: Kyzyltepa) is a town and seat of Qiziltepa District in Navoiy Region in Uzbekistan. The population was 9884 people in 1989, and 12,200 in 2016. The name translates to “Red hill”.
