= Gʻozgʻon =

Urban-type settlement in Navoiy Region, Uzbekistan

- City
- Location in Uzbekistan
- Coordinates: 40°35′40″N 65°29′47″E
- Country: Uzbekistan
- Region: Navoiy Region
- Urban-type settlement: 1975

Area
  - Total: 590 km^{2} (230 sq mi)

Population (2021)
  - Total: 8,800
  - Density: 15/km^{2} (39/sq mi)
- Time zone: UTC+5 (UZT)

Gʻozgʻon (Uzbek: Gʻozgʻon/Ғозғон, Russian: Газган, romanized: Gazgan) is a district-level city in Navoiy Region, Uzbekistan. It has an area of 590 km^{2} (230 sq mi) and it has 8,800 inhabitants (2021). The town population in 1989 was 4,728 people.
