= Beshrabot =

- Village
- Location in Uzbekistan
- Coordinates: 40°14′28″N 65°17′43″E
- Country: Uzbekistan
- Region: Navoiy Region
- District: Navbakhor District
- Elevation: 329 m (1,079 ft)

Population (2000)
  - Total: 5 142
- Time zone: UTC+5 (UZT)

Beshrabot (Uzbek: Beshrabot/Бешрабoт, Russian: Бешрабат) is a village and seat of Navbakhor District in Navoiy Region in Uzbekistan.
