= Tamdybulak =

Tamdybulak Тамдыбулақ, Tamdibulaq
- Town
- Tamdybulak
- Location in Uzbekistan
- Coordinates: 41°45′N 64°37′E
- Country: Uzbekistan
- Region: Navoiy Region
- District: Tamdy District
- Elevation: 297 m (974 ft)

Population (2022)
  - Total: 5,000
- Time zone: UTC+5 (UZT)

Tamdybulaq, sometimes also written as Tamdybulak, is an urban-type settlement and seat of Tamdy District in Navoiy Region in Uzbekistan. Its population is 5,000 (2022 est.).

== Geography ==
Tamdybulak lies in the Kyzyl Kum desert, a flat, arid plain with scattered sand dunes.

== Transportation ==
Tamdybulak is served by the Tamdy Bulak Airport.

Roads from the town lead southwest to Zarafshan, southeast to Ayakkuduk, and north to Sukuti and Keriz.

== Climate ==
Tamdybulak has a desert climate (Köppen climate classification BWk), with cold winters and very hot summers. Rain is light and sporadic, and usually occurs from November to May.

Climate data for Tamdybulak (1991-2020, extremes 1932-present)
Month	Jan	Feb	Mar	Apr	May	Jun	Jul	Aug	Sep	Oct	Nov	Dec	Year
Record high °C (°F)	22.8 (73.0)	28.0 (82.4)	34.0 (93.2)	40.1 (104.2)	43.1 (109.6)	46.0 (114.8)	48.4 (119.1)	45.8 (114.4)	42.7 (108.9)	38.2 (100.8)	30.9 (87.6)	22.5 (72.5)	48.4 (119.1)
Mean daily maximum °C (°F)	3.1 (37.6)	6.2 (43.2)	14.9 (58.8)	22.9 (73.2)	30.3 (86.5)	36.0 (96.8)	37.8 (100.0)	36.0 (96.8)	29.5 (85.1)	21.2 (70.2)	11.1 (52.0)	4.4 (39.9)	21.1 (70.0)
Daily mean °C (°F)	−1.1 (30.0)	1.1 (34.0)	8.6 (47.5)	16.3 (61.3)	23.4 (74.1)	29.2 (84.6)	31.2 (88.2)	29.1 (84.4)	22.3 (72.1)	14.2 (57.6)	5.7 (42.3)	0.1 (32.2)	15.0 (59.0)
Mean daily minimum °C (°F)	−4.6 (23.7)	−3.2 (26.2)	3.2 (37.8)	10.2 (50.4)	16.8 (62.2)	22.0 (71.6)	24.1 (75.4)	22.0 (71.6)	15.4 (59.7)	8.1 (46.6)	1.1 (34.0)	−3.6 (25.5)	9.3 (48.7)
Record low °C (°F)	−28.2 (−18.8)	−30.1 (−22.2)	−24.9 (−12.8)	−8.0 (17.6)	0.4 (32.7)	7.0 (44.6)	11.6 (52.9)	7.4 (45.3)	−1.8 (28.8)	−11.1 (12.0)	−24.8 (−12.6)	−28.2 (−18.8)	−30.1 (−22.2)
Average precipitation mm (inches)	10.6 (0.42)	15.8 (0.62)	17.5 (0.69)	14.9 (0.59)	12.9 (0.51)	4.5 (0.18)	1.7 (0.07)	2.3 (0.09)	0.4 (0.02)	4.1 (0.16)	12.4 (0.49)	12.1 (0.48)	109.2 (4.32)
Average extreme snow depth cm (inches)	1 (0.4)	2 (0.8)	0 (0)	0 (0)	0 (0)	0 (0)	0 (0)	0 (0)	0 (0)	0 (0)	0 (0)	1 (0.4)	2 (0.8)
Average rainy days	4	4	6	6	4	2	1	1	1	2	4	4	39
Average snowy days	6	4	1	0.1	0	0	0	0	0	0.1	2	4	17.2
Average relative humidity (%)	72	66	56	44	36	28	25	25	30	41	60	71	46
Mean monthly sunshine hours	110.6	144.0	195.8	244.6	317.9	350.6	396.2	378.0	315.8	252.0	156.6	110.5	2,972.6
Source 1: Pogoda.ru.net
Source 2: NOAA
