= Sentob =

Sentob Sentyab
- urban-type settlement
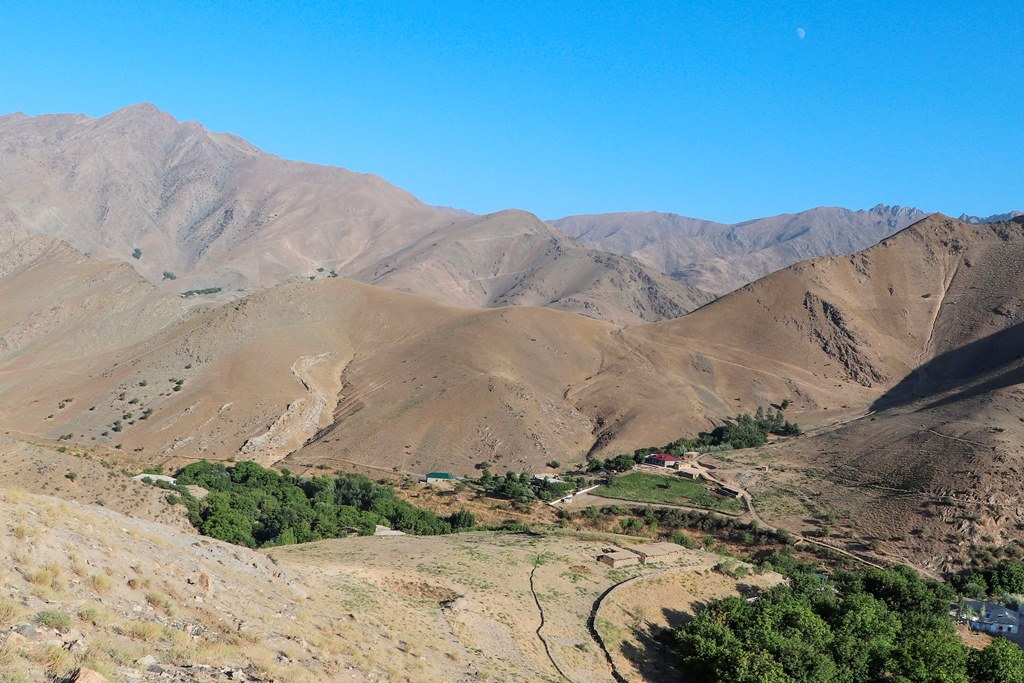
- Sentob valley

- Location in Uzbekistan
- Coordinates: 40°36′N 66°43′E
- Country: Uzbekistan
- Region: Navoiy Region
- District: Nurota District
- Time zone: UTC+5 (UZT)

Sentob, also Sentyab or Sintab (Uzbek: Sentyab; Russian: Сентяб), is an Uzbek village in Nurota District, Navoiy Region of Uzbekistan. The settlement is nestled 30 km south of the Aydar Lake 6 km into a fertile green river valley of the Nuratau Mountains. It is situated at an elevation of 600 m and the town population is about 1,000 people.

== Description of the village ==
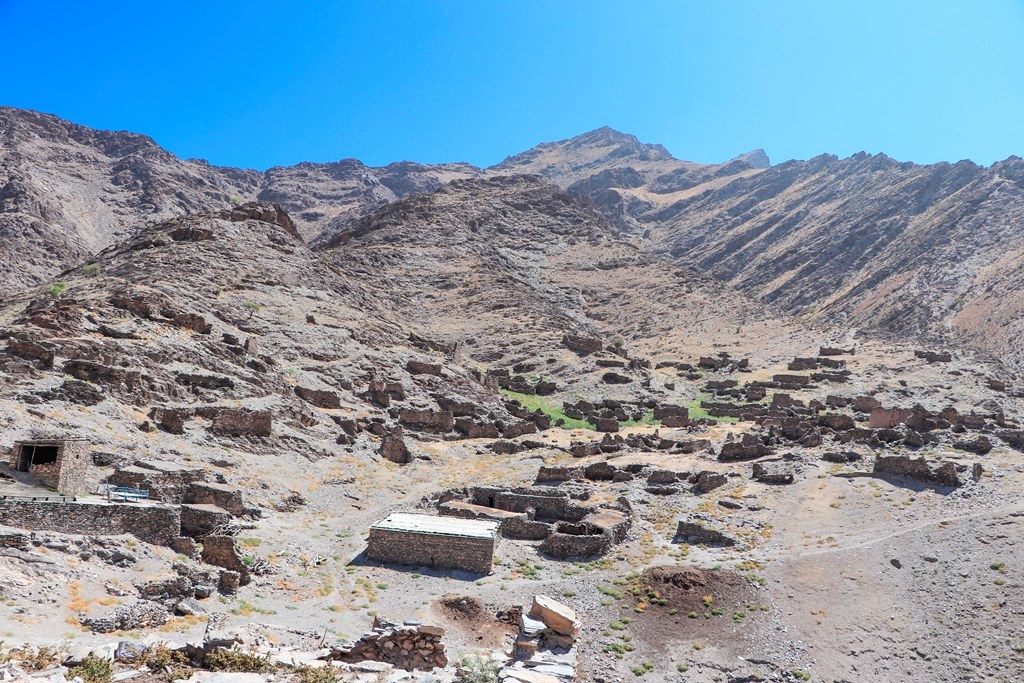
Sentob old village ruins

Sentob is a village with structures built on natural stone fenced by traditional stone walls. Going up the Sentob river valley – locally known as Kadvan valley - passing along scattered outbuildings, cemeteries, abandoned houses and mosques built of flat stones, a rocky outcrop with the hilltop ruins of the old village is reached. As with most of the villages in the Nuratau mountains, Sentob previously existed as a small stone village tucked away on an unprepossessing plateau primarily for safety. This spot was largely abandoned, and even those who later moved back elected to live at lower elevations in more modern structures.

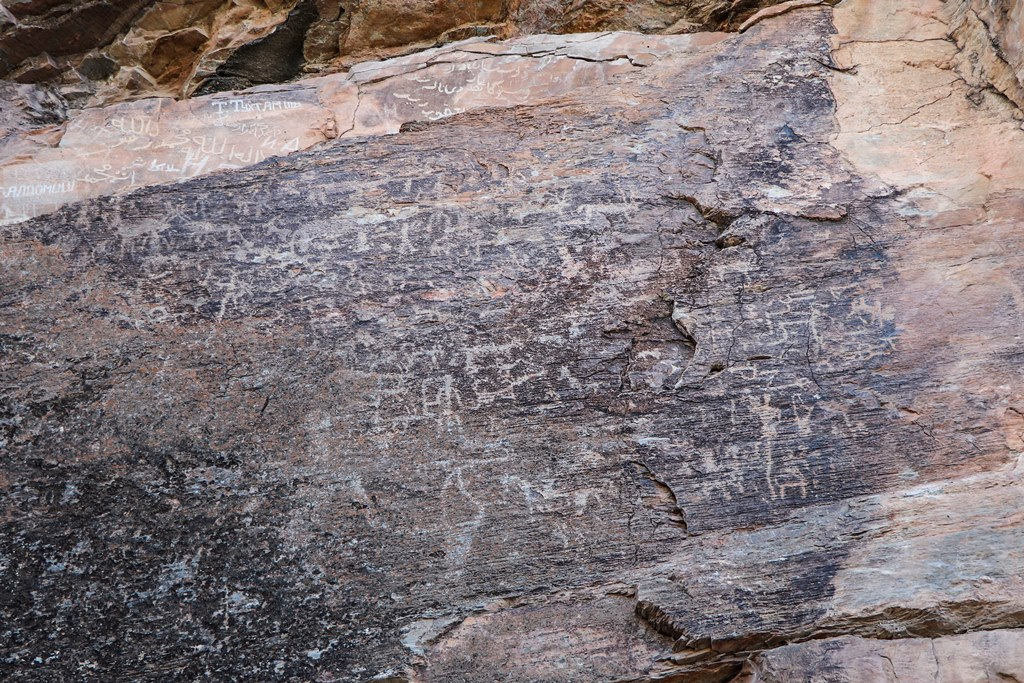
Sentob pedroglyphs

In the gorge cliffs just below the rocky outcrop there are Bronze Age petroglyphs: Oxen, deer, wild rams and nomads with bows and arrows, as well as Medieval Times horsemen along with Arabic inscriptions.

Most of the village's usable land is dedicated to agriculture and food forest sprinkled with walnut, pistachio and fruit trees. The village has a pleasant natural setting and is a great starting point for mountain hikes into the Nuratau Mountains to observe its wide variety of wildflowers.
