= Uchquduq =

Uchquduq Uchquduq
- City
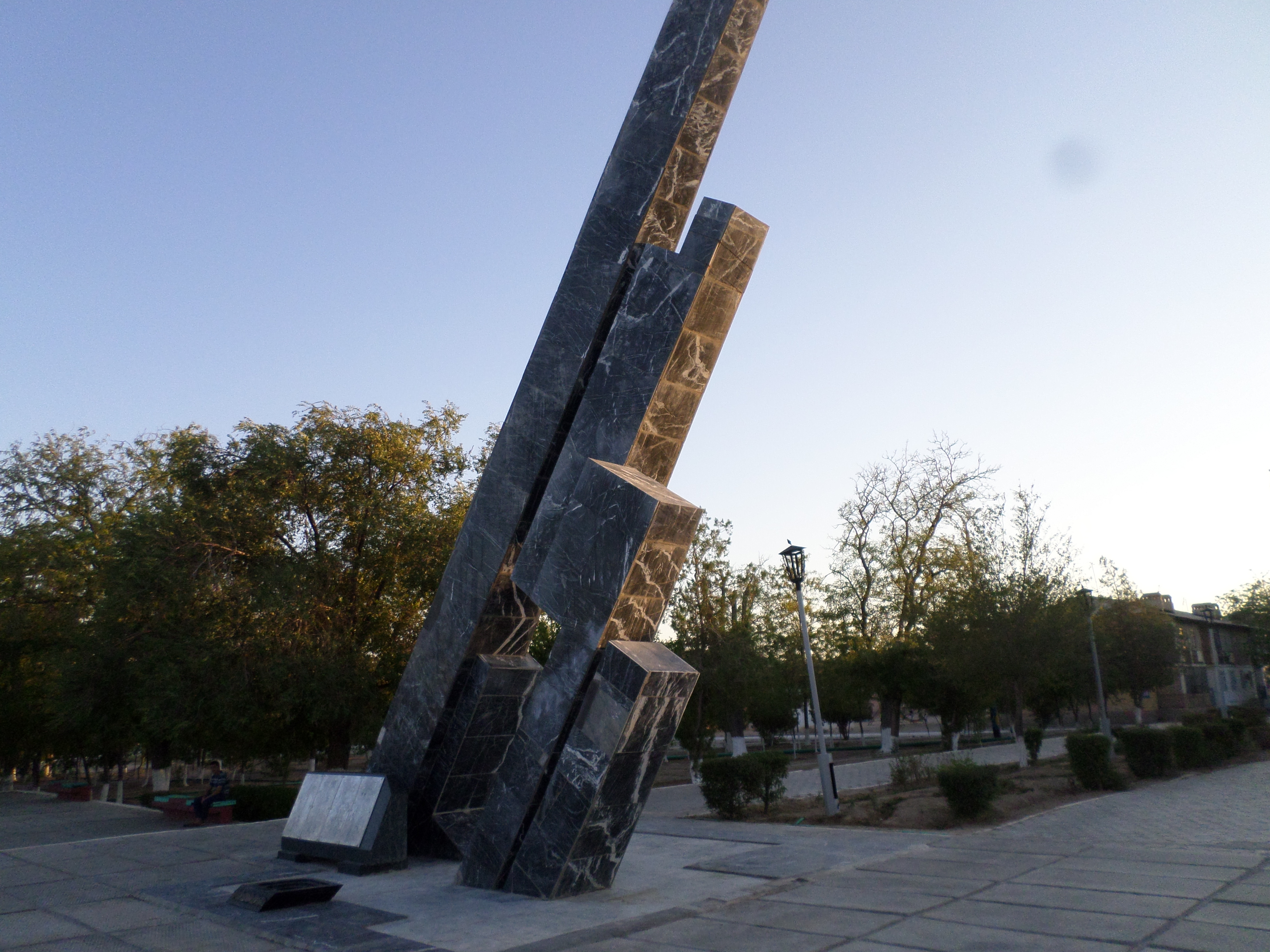
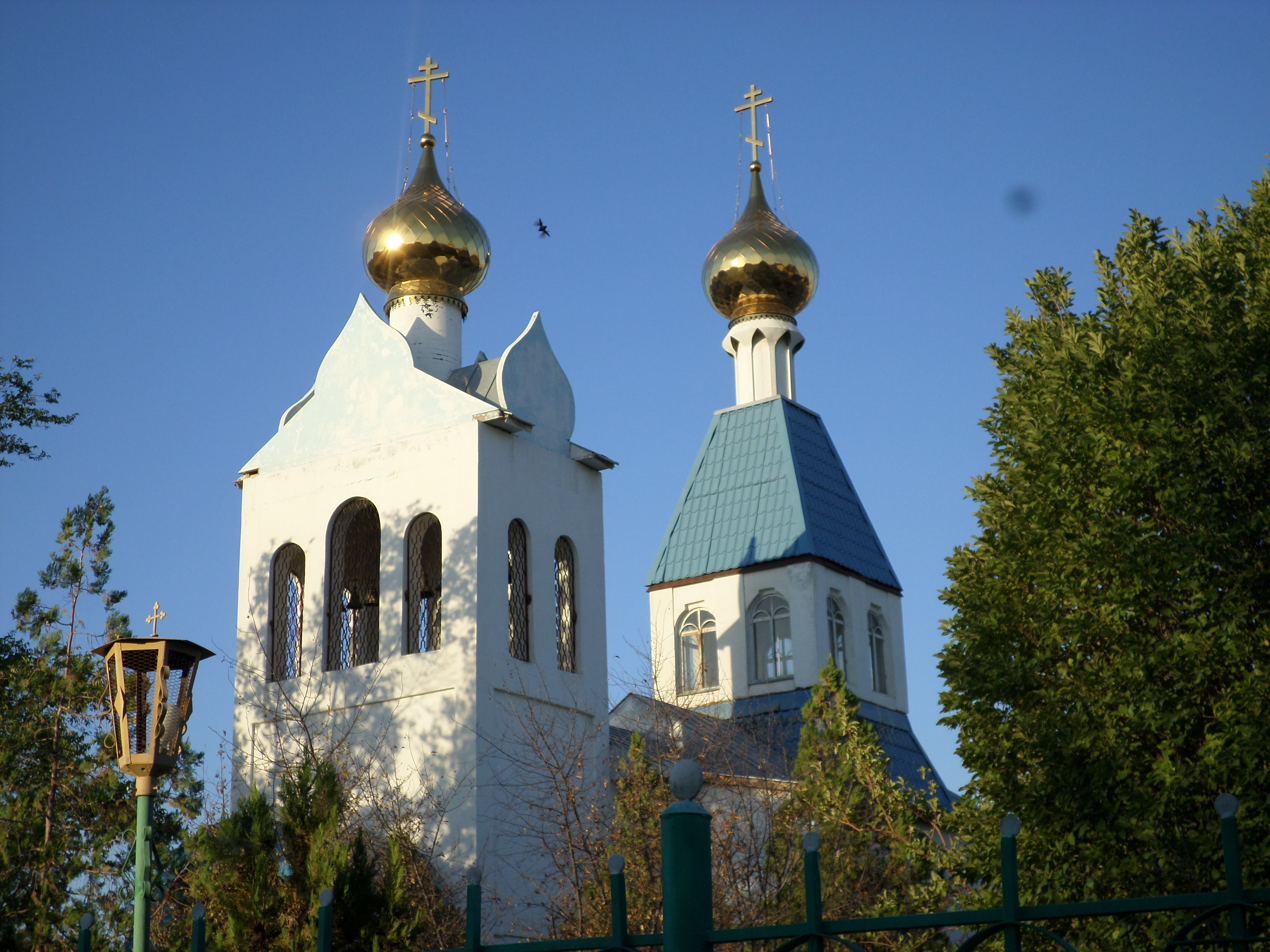
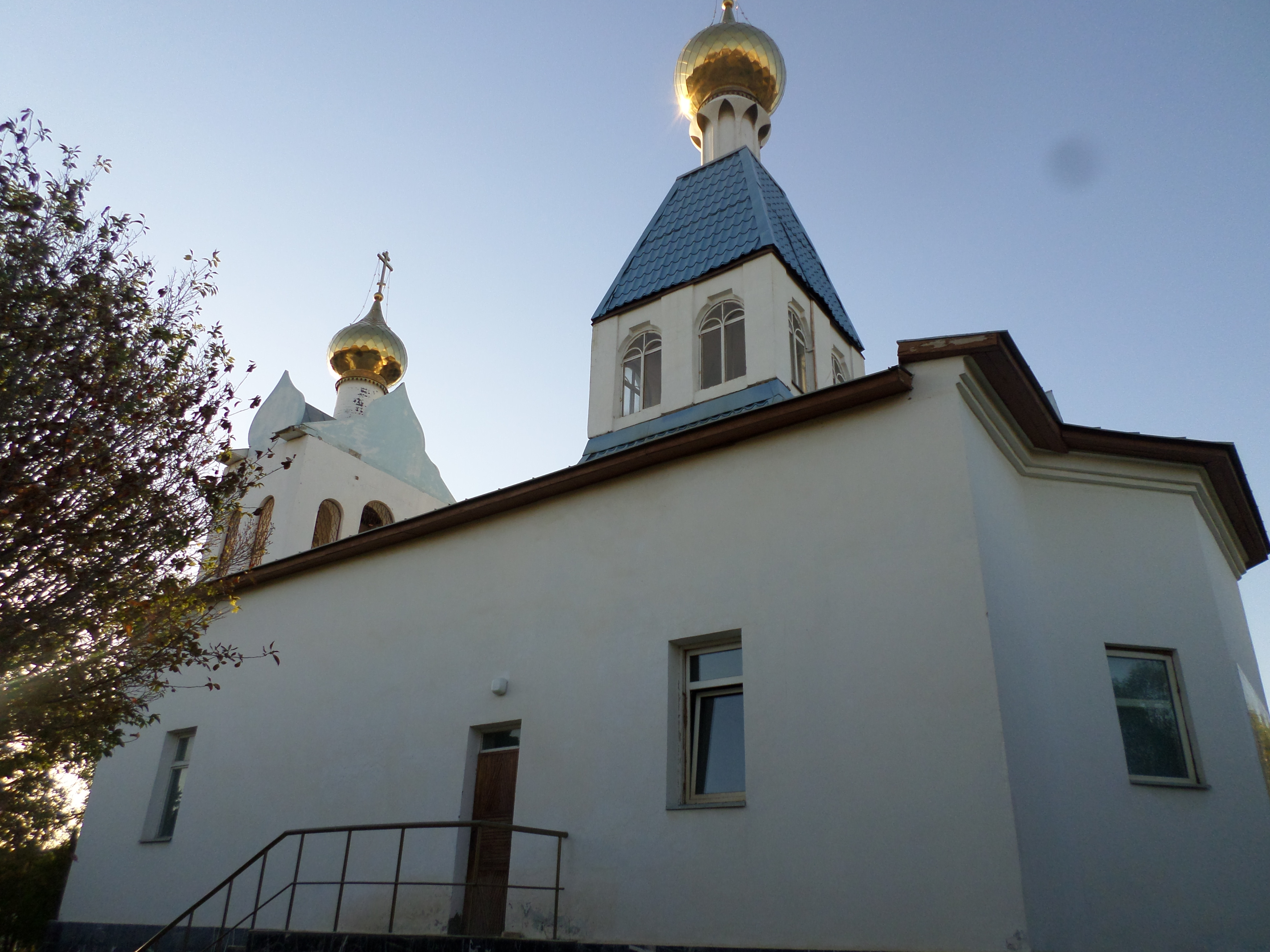
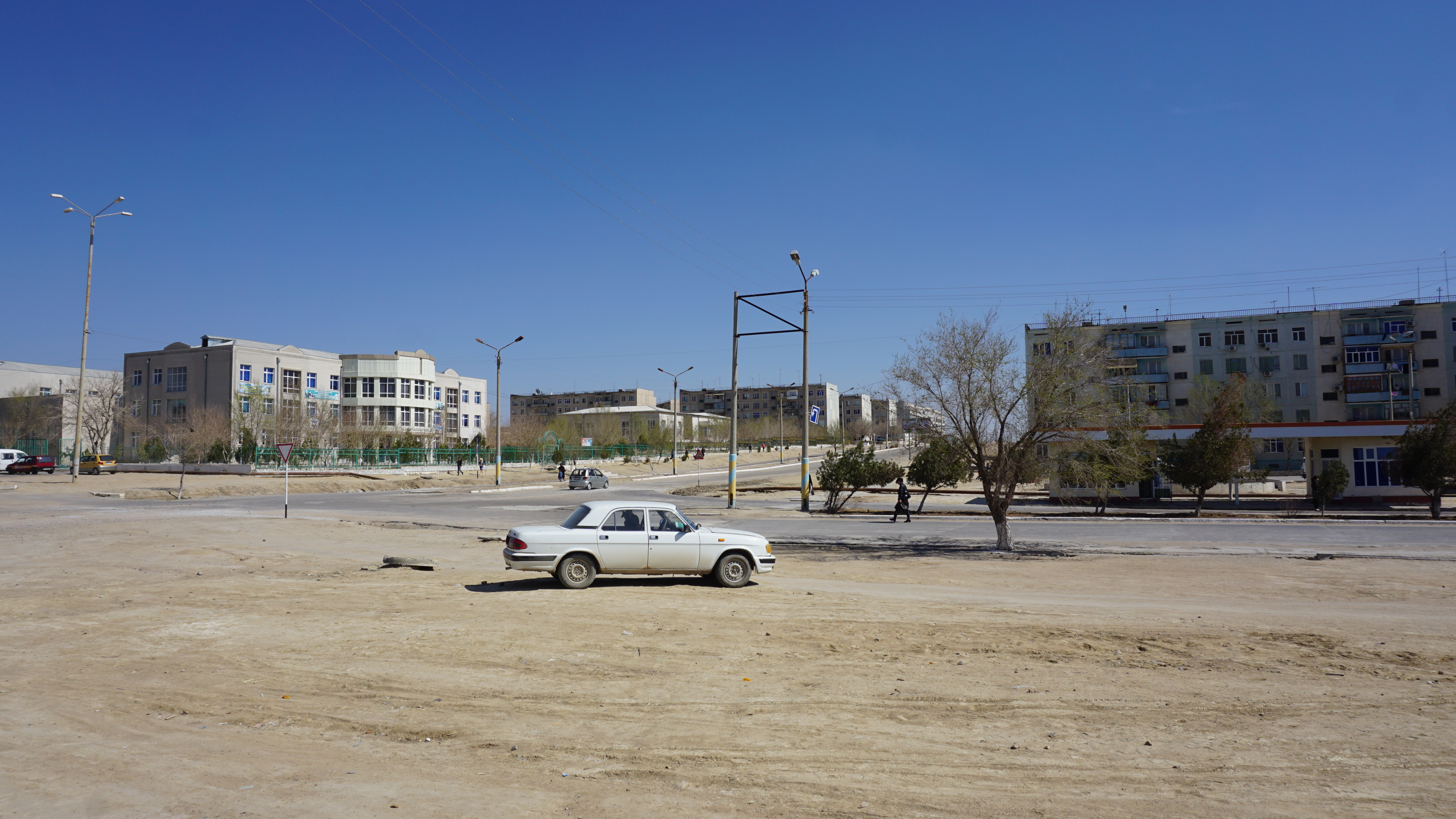
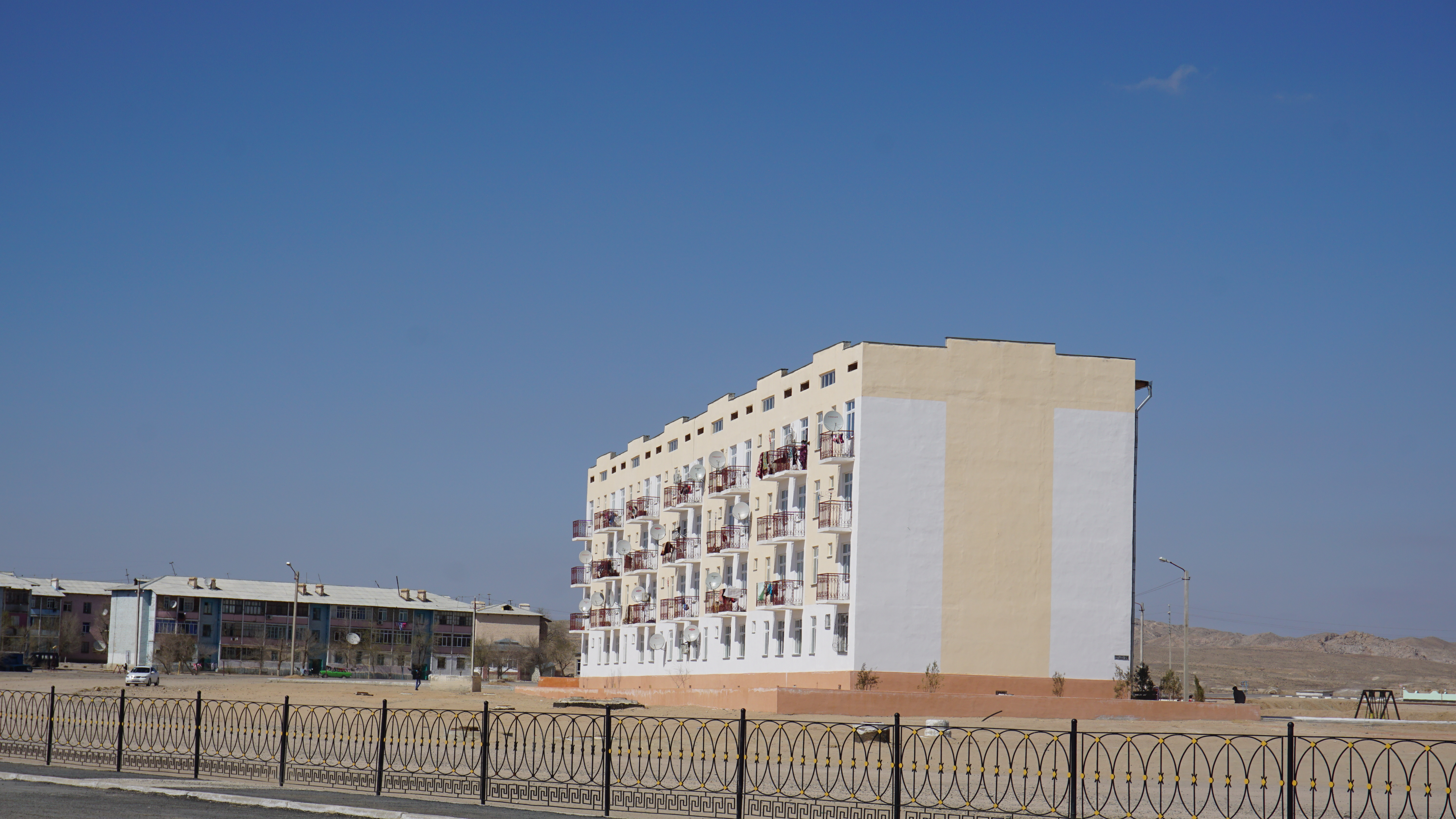
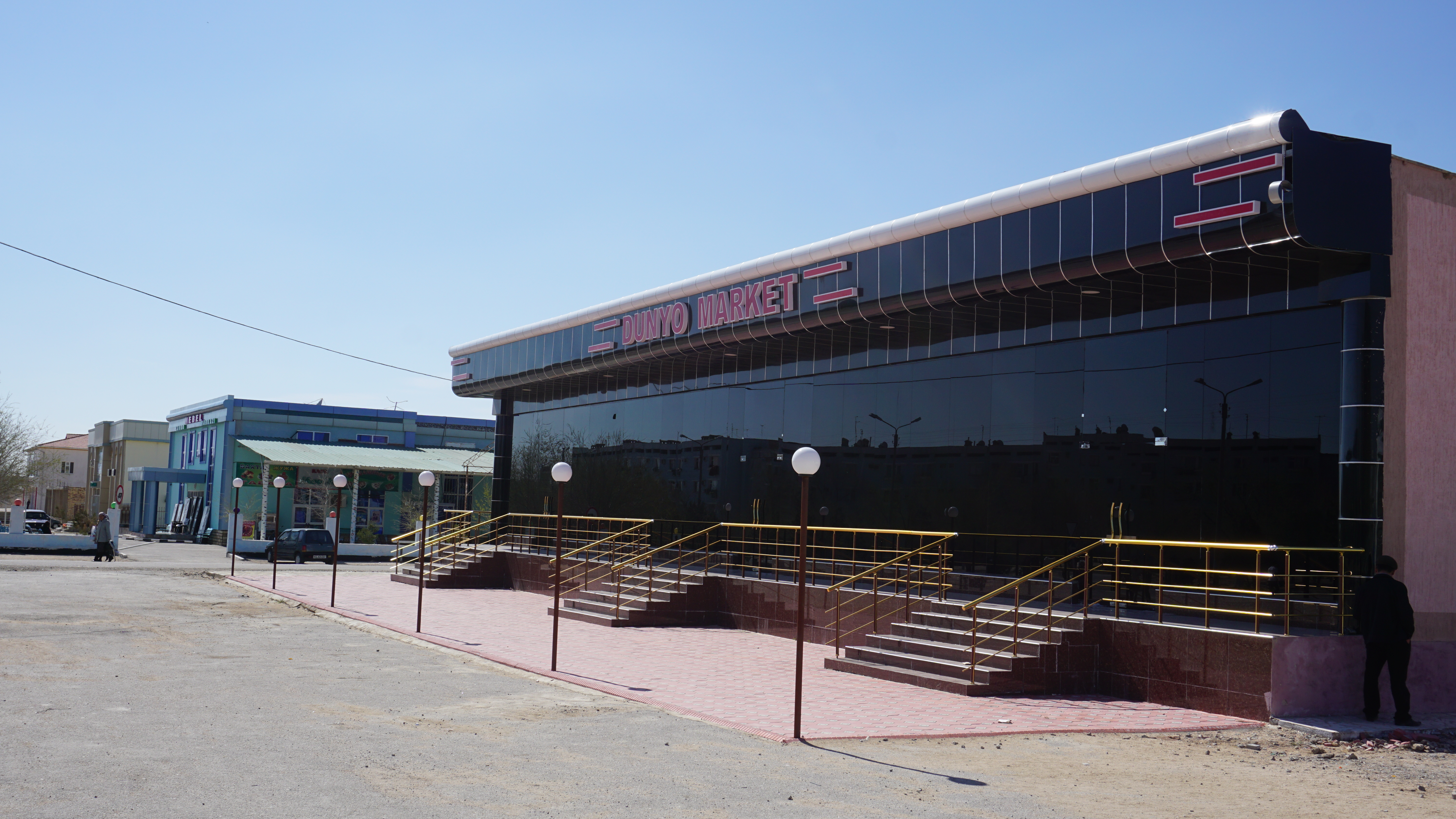

- Location in Uzbekistan
- Coordinates: 42°09′24″N 63°33′20″E
- Country: Uzbekistan
- Region: Navoiy Region
- District: Uchquduq District
- Elevation: 193 m (633 ft)

Population (2016)
  - Total: 26,800
- Time zone: UTC+05:00 (UZT)

Uchquduq (sometimes spelled as Uchkuduk, Uzbek: Uchquduq/Учқудуқ; Russian: Учкуду́к) is a city in the north of Navoiy Region, Uzbekistan. It is the seat of Uchquduq District. The city's name means "three draw-wells" in Uzbek.

== History ==
Uchquduq was founded in 1958, after a small prospecting party found deposits of uranium ore. In the late 1960s, the development of open pit and underground mining led to the rapid growth of the settlement, with workers, engineers and technicians from all over the Soviet Union. It was elevated to city status in 1978. Until 1979, Uchquduq had the status of a "closed secret city," as it supplied much of the raw material for nuclear weapons in the Soviet military arsenal. The mining operations are now under the control of the Navoi Mining and Metallurgical Company (NMMC), which continues to mine and process uranium using in-situ leach processes. The company also produces gold by the same process.

On 10 July 1985, Tupolev Tu-154 Aeroflot Flight 5143 crashed around 50 kilometres (31 miles) away from Uchquduq killing all 200 people on board, 52 of whom were children; this was the deadliest air disaster to take place in the Soviet Union.

The Uzbek music group Yalla released a song named after the city in 1981, which became one of the most popular songs in the Soviet Union.

At COP29, Uzbekistan's Ministry of Energy and Masdar agreed to build a 1,000 MW wind power plant in the region, to generate 3.5 billion kWh annually and cut emissions by 1.4 million tons.
