= Nurota =

Nurota Nurota / Нурота
- City
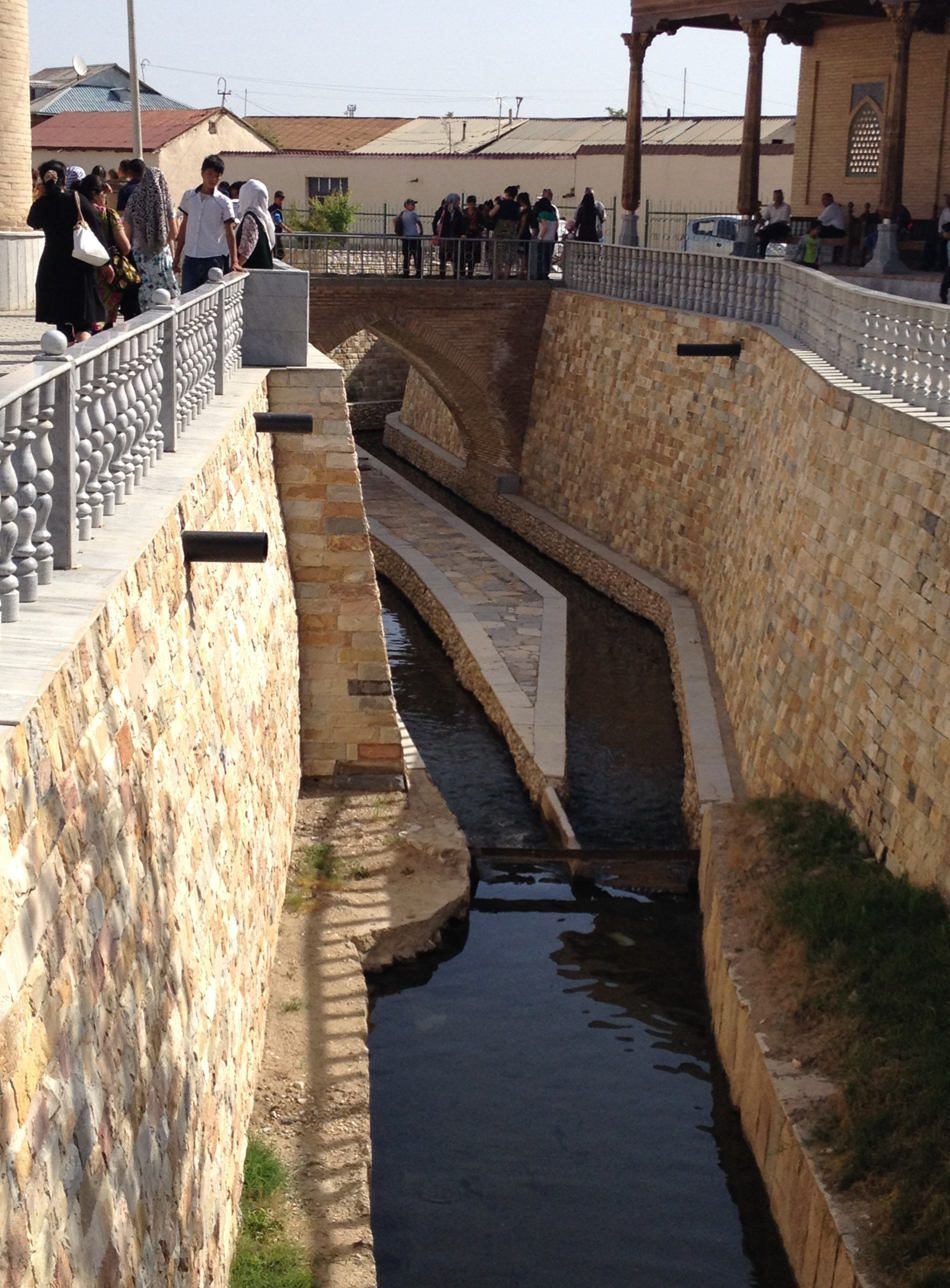
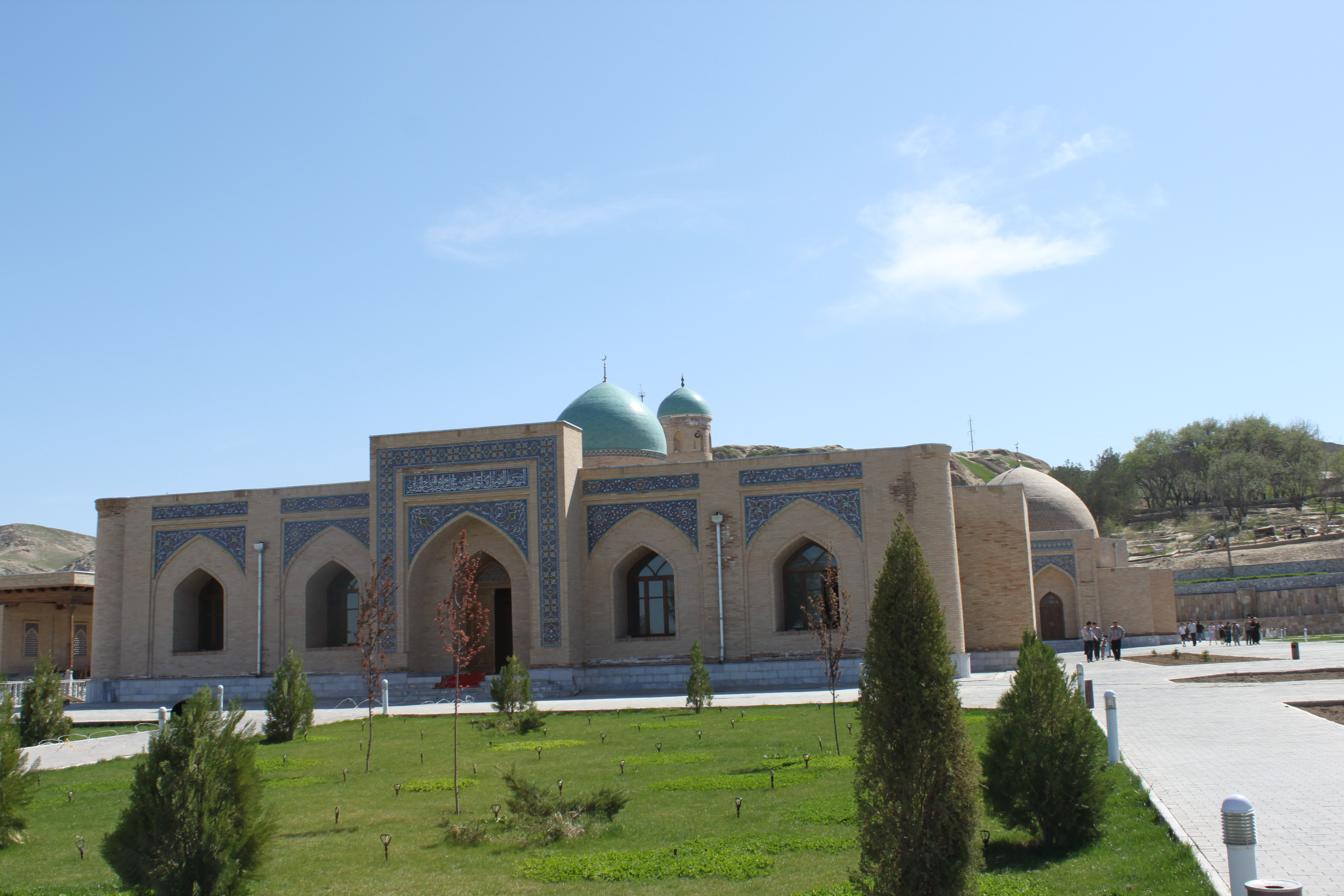
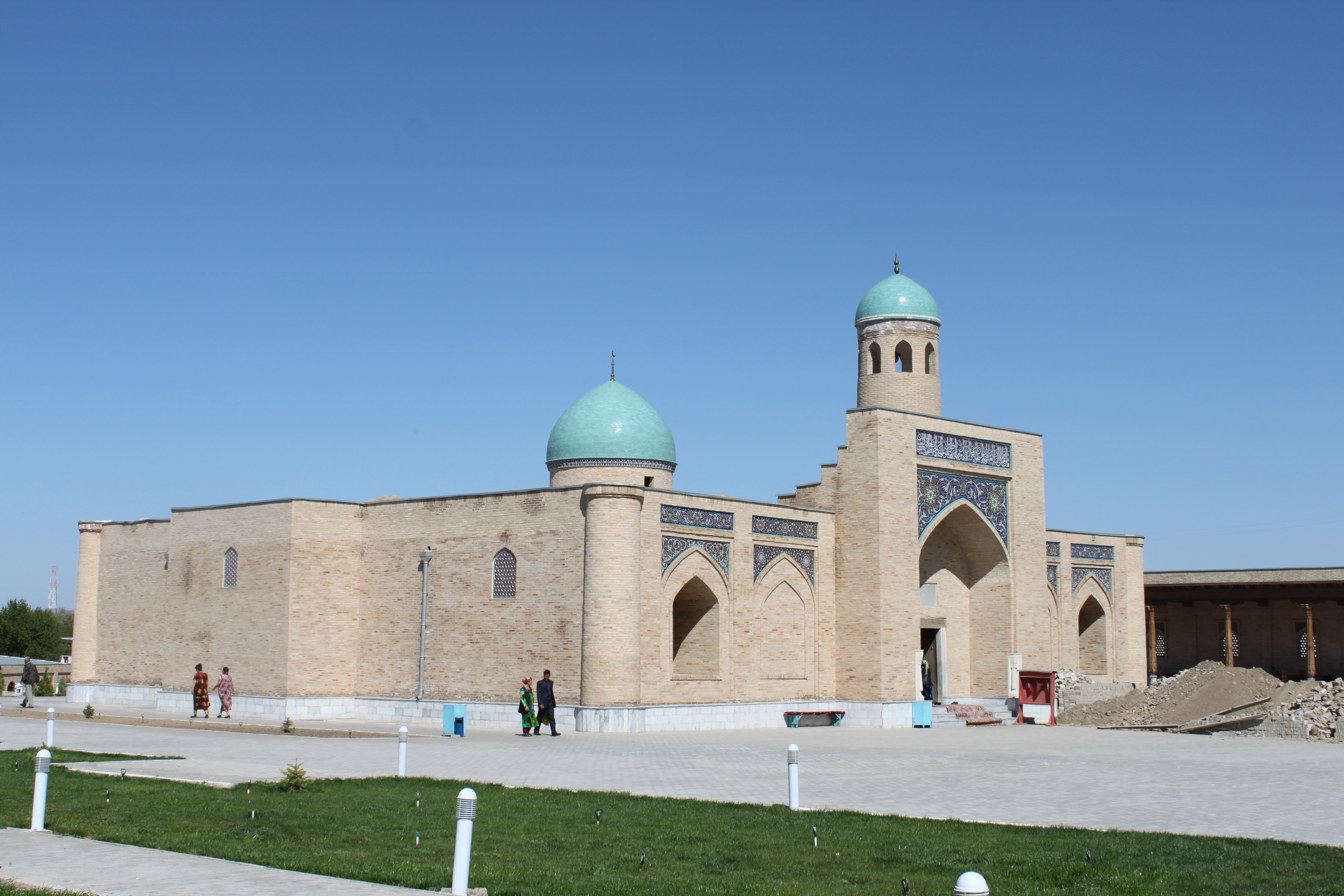
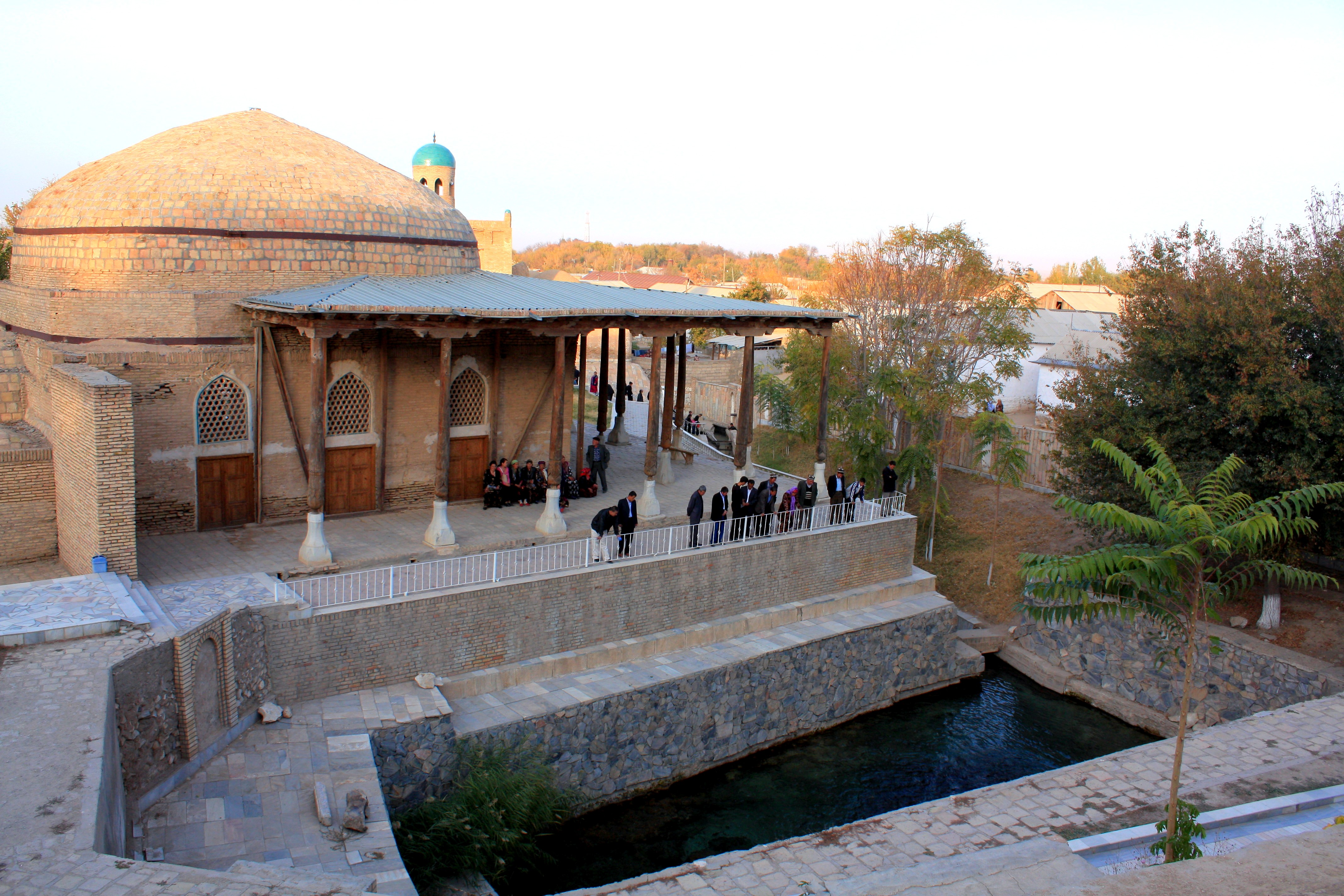
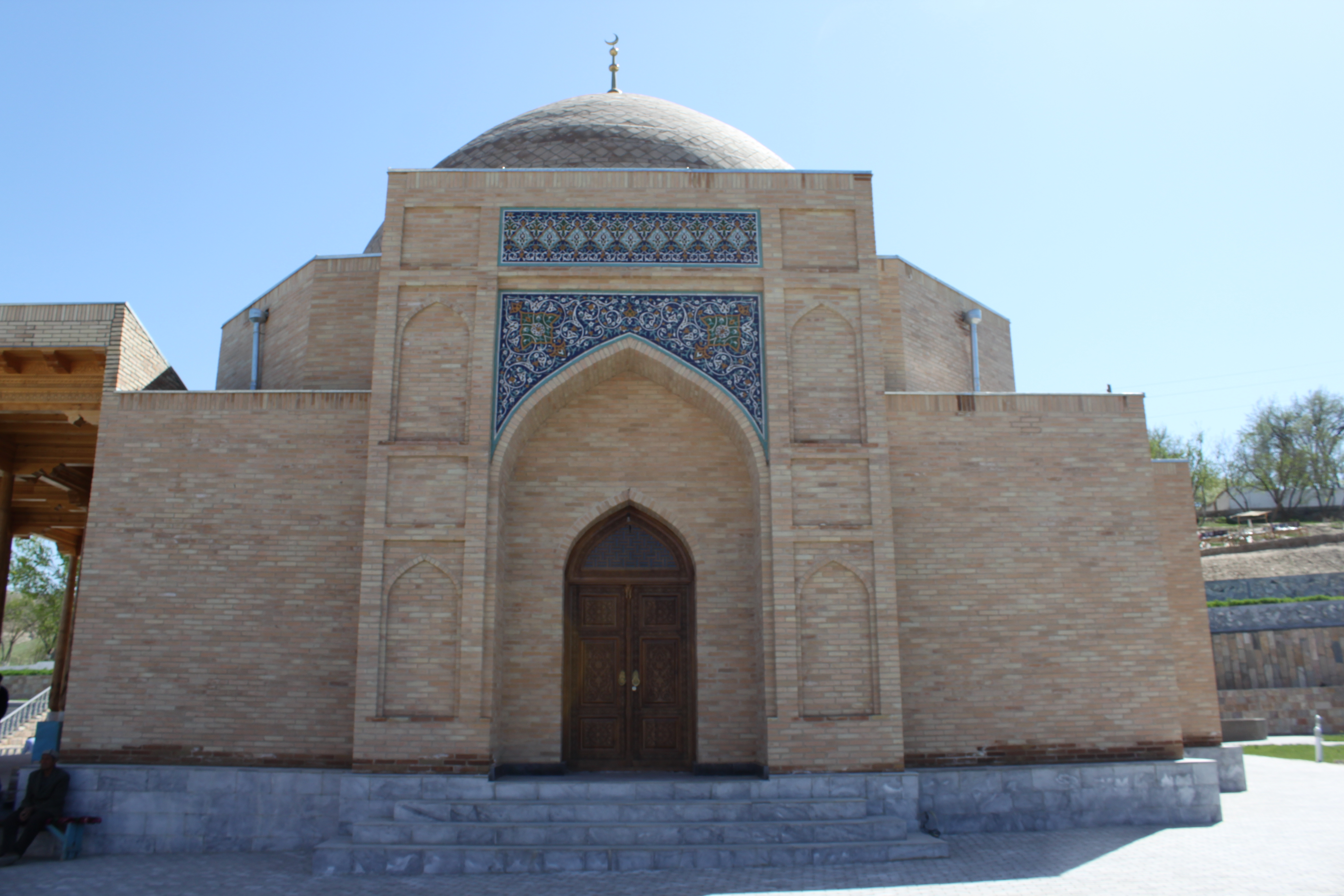
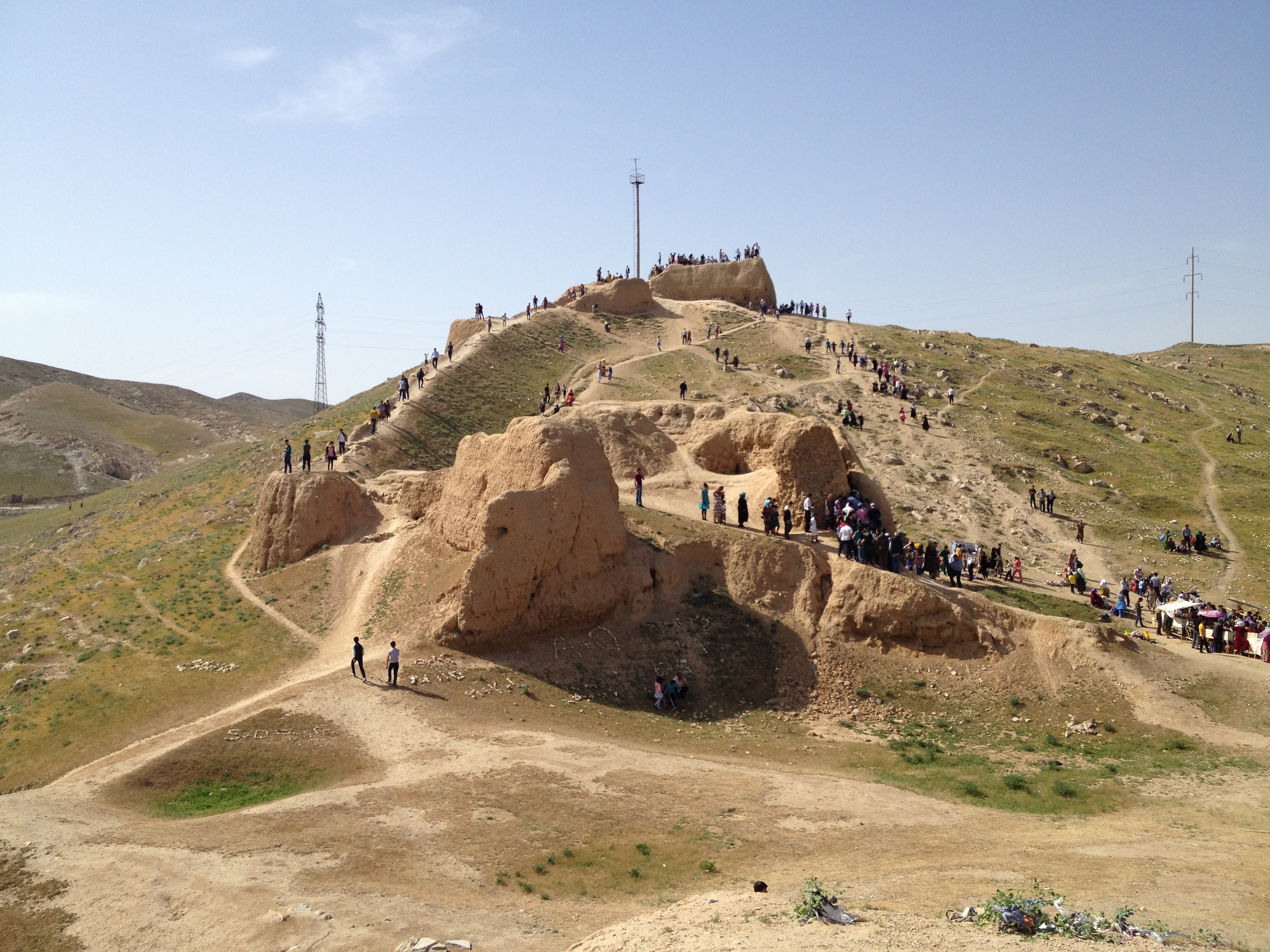
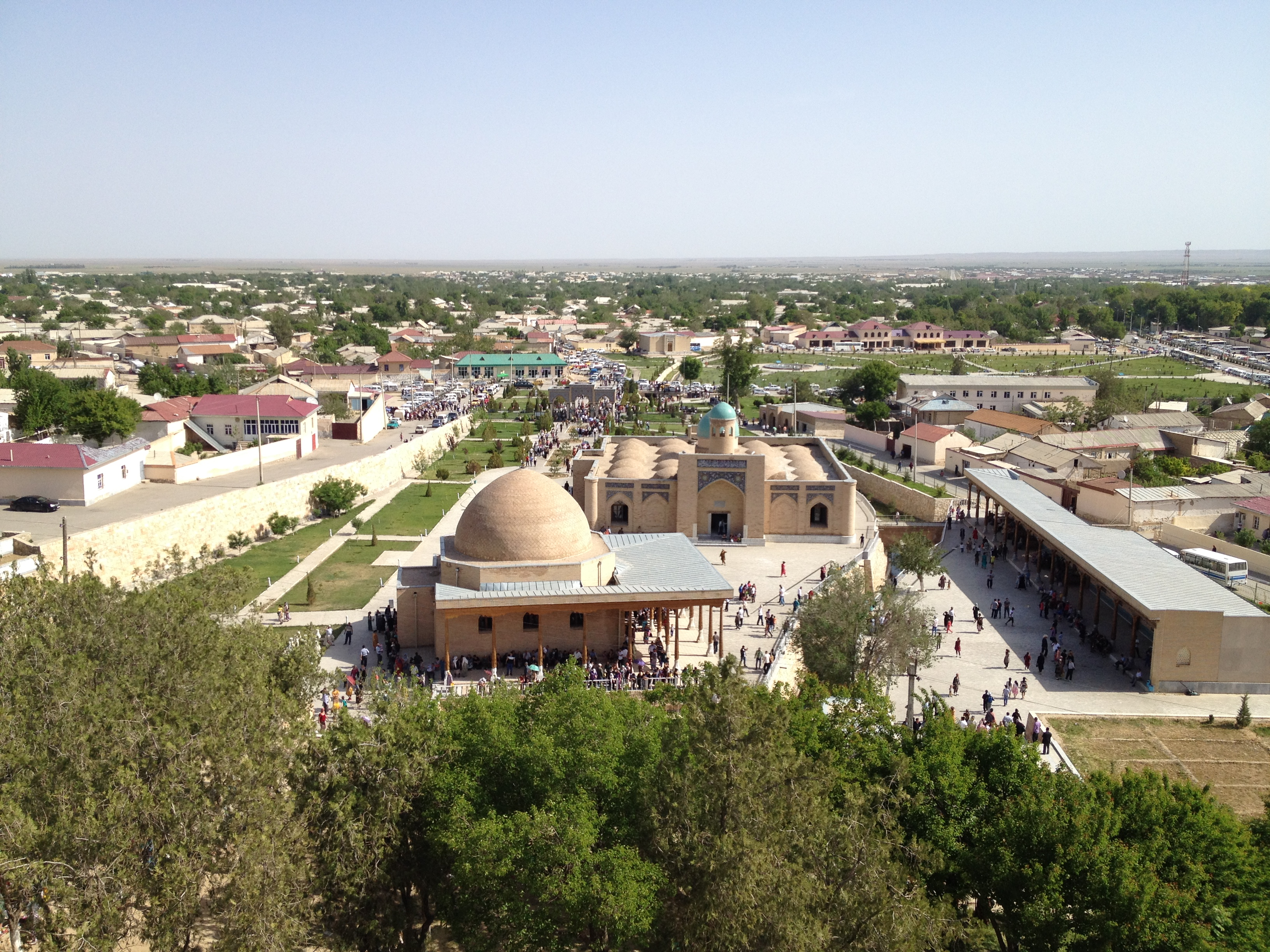

- Location in Uzbekistan
- Coordinates: 40°33′54″N 65°41′06″E
- Country: Uzbekistan
- Region: Navoiy Region
- District: Nurota District
- Elevation: 490 m (1,610 ft)

Population (2016)
  - Total: 32,300
- Time zone: UTC+5 (UZT)

Nurota (sometimes spelled as Nurata, Uzbek: Nurota, Нурота; Tajik: Нурато; Russian: Нурата) is a city and the seat of Nurota District in Navoiy Region in Uzbekistan. Its population is 32,300 (2016).

== History ==
Nurota was founded as the ancient town Nur, in 327 BC by Alexander the Great. The remains of his military fortress in the south of the town are still to be seen today and the water supply system that Alexander had installed is still partially used.

The fortress consisted of several parts, with Shahristan (the inner town) 500×500 meters in size, which was surrounded by a large wall and towers. The construction of a fortress at Nurota had a definite purpose, as the town was set in a strategic place at the border between an agricultural area and a wild steppe. This area is mentioned in several historical chronicles as an important strategic area convenient for gathering an army before attacking neighboring lands and as a place of refuge for rebels and outcasts.

There are several stories about the origin and the name of the area. The town was built by Alexander the Great in the 4th century BC and corresponds to the Nur Forts. The cultural layer in this region approaches the age of 40,000 years, according to archeological excavations. The spring, known as Chashma, was meant to be the key explanation for this place of settlement.

The town is also famous as a Muslim pilgrimage place. Muhammad Narshakhi, who wrote about the history of Bukhara in 943, provides information about the settlement of Nur, located at the foot of the mountain. Narshakhi wrote,” Many people, who are buried there, have seen Prophet Muhammad”. During the 10th century, pilgrims from Bukhara and other places came to the holy graves situated next to the town fortifications and mosques. Currently, pilgrims continue visiting the holy places. Chashma is a place of pilgrimage for believers and one of the most significant religious centers of Islam in the region. The complex of religious constructions “Chasma” (Tadjik word for spring) includes the spring, a well, mosque “Djuma” and khamom (bathhouse). The round Djuma mosque was constructed above the spring and has 40 columns. The dome, 16 meters in diameter is one of the largest in Central Asia. On the south-east part of the complex is a Nur-ata cemetery with the burial place of a saint person.

The construction of Karez, a unique underground water-pipeline system near Nurota, is also connected with the name of Alexander the Great. Kariz is an ancient water-pipe laid from the source of the spring water to a place where it could be used. Its length could reach several kilometers. Interconnected wells that were dug out several meters apart from each other, were used for cleaning the pipeline system. Today the process of reviving these old pipeline systems is taking place. Parts of the pipeline systems near Nurota were restored and are being used by local people.

== Climate ==
Nurota has a cold desert climate (Köppen climate classification BWk).

Climate data for Nurota (1991–2020, extremes 1948–present)
Month	Jan	Feb	Mar	Apr	May	Jun	Jul	Aug	Sep	Oct	Nov	Dec	Year
Record high °C (°F)	23.9 (75.0)	30.0 (86.0)	32.8 (91.0)	37.7 (99.9)	42.2 (108.0)	44.7 (112.5)	46.7 (116.1)	44.0 (111.2)	40.5 (104.9)	37.8 (100.0)	31.0 (87.8)	25.4 (77.7)	46.7 (116.1)
Mean daily maximum °C (°F)	6.1 (43.0)	8.0 (46.4)	14.8 (58.6)	21.6 (70.9)	28.4 (83.1)	34.0 (93.2)	35.9 (96.6)	34.4 (93.9)	28.4 (83.1)	21.5 (70.7)	12.9 (55.2)	7.7 (45.9)	21.1 (70.1)
Daily mean °C (°F)	1.1 (34.0)	2.7 (36.9)	8.8 (47.8)	15.2 (59.4)	21.3 (70.3)	26.5 (79.7)	28.4 (83.1)	26.4 (79.5)	20.1 (68.2)	13.2 (55.8)	6.5 (43.7)	2.3 (36.1)	14.4 (57.9)
Mean daily minimum °C (°F)	−3.4 (25.9)	−2.2 (28.0)	3.2 (37.8)	8.9 (48.0)	13.5 (56.3)	17.9 (64.2)	19.8 (67.6)	17.7 (63.9)	12.1 (53.8)	6.1 (43.0)	1.1 (34.0)	−2.3 (27.9)	7.7 (45.9)
Record low °C (°F)	−29.2 (−20.6)	−32.2 (−26.0)	−21.1 (−6.0)	−7.8 (18.0)	−2.4 (27.7)	5.8 (42.4)	8.9 (48.0)	3.0 (37.4)	−2.0 (28.4)	−9.3 (15.3)	−21.1 (−6.0)	−26.1 (−15.0)	−32.2 (−26.0)
Average precipitation mm (inches)	24 (0.9)	33 (1.3)	38 (1.5)	33 (1.3)	19 (0.7)	4 (0.2)	2 (0.1)	2 (0.1)	2 (0.1)	8 (0.3)	24 (0.9)	24 (0.9)	213 (8.3)
Source: Pogoda.ru.net
