= Nurota District =

Coordinates: 40°34′N 65°41′E

- District
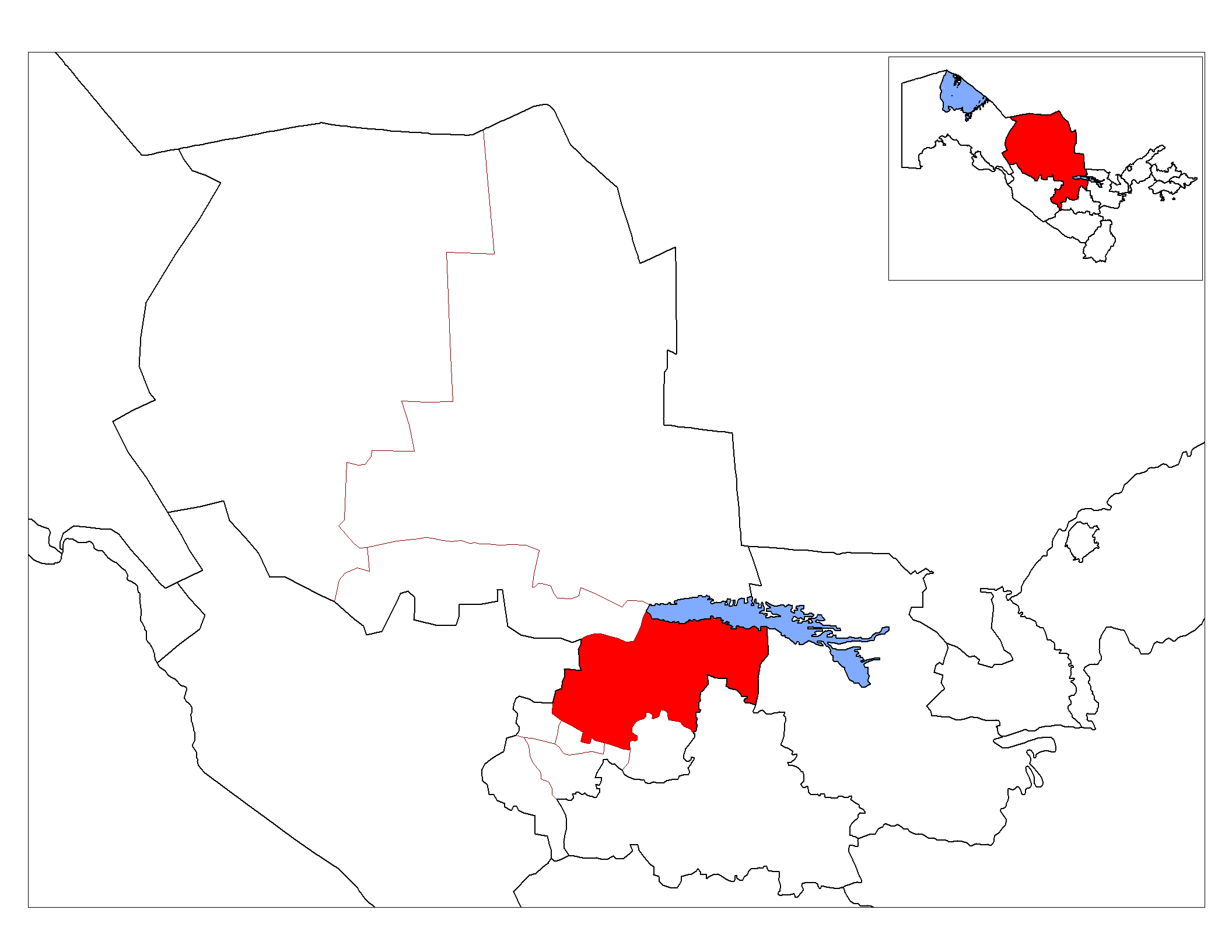
- Country: Uzbekistan
- Region: Navoiy Region
- Capital: Nurota

Area
  - Total: 5,940 km^{2} (2,290 sq mi)

Population (2021)
  - Total: 85,200
  - Density: 14.3/km^{2} (37.1/sq mi)
- Time zone: UTC+5 (UZT)

Nurota District (Uzbek: Nurota tumani) is a district of Navoiy Region in Uzbekistan. The capital lies at the city Nurota. It has an area of 5,940 km^{2} (2,290 sq mi) and its population is 85,200 (2021 est.).

== Settlements ==
The district consists of one city (Nurota), 4 urban-type settlements (Qizilcha, Temurqovuq, Chuya, Yangibino) and 7 rural communities (Dehibaland, Gum, Gʻozgʻon, Qizilcha, Nurota, Sentob, Chuya).

== History ==
The Nurata District was established on September 29, 1926, having the village of Nurota as its central place. From August 17, 1930, it belonged to Samarqand region, then to Navoiy region since 1982, then again Samarqand region since 1988, and finally from March 1992 to Navoiy region.

== Population ==
The population is mainly Uzbeks (86%) and Tajiks (11%), 3% are from other nationalities. There are 12 people per 1 km^{2}. The urban population is 30.1 thousand, the rural population is 47.9 thousand (2003).

== Economy ==
=== Agriculture ===
The district agriculture mainly specializes in animal husbandry and agriculture (grappling) in 4 Agricultural cooperatives and about 500 farmers. There are mevasor, vineyards and gulps. Cattle, tiger, and poultry are grown in collective farms and private farms.

=== Industry and commerce ===
Motor transport in the district is the main occupation. Buses from the city of Nurata regularly visit the regional center. One of the major companies in the country is the Gozgommarmar Joint-Stock Company. There are also Nurotamarmar, Nurotaavtoyulmarmar, Nurbuloq mineral water packaging enterprise, Chashma, Istiqlol trade factories and sewing factories. Of the 700 enterprises in the region, 551 are small firms, about 70 small enterprises and medium enterprises
