= Karmana District =

Coordinates: 40°12′36″N 65°22′12″E

- District
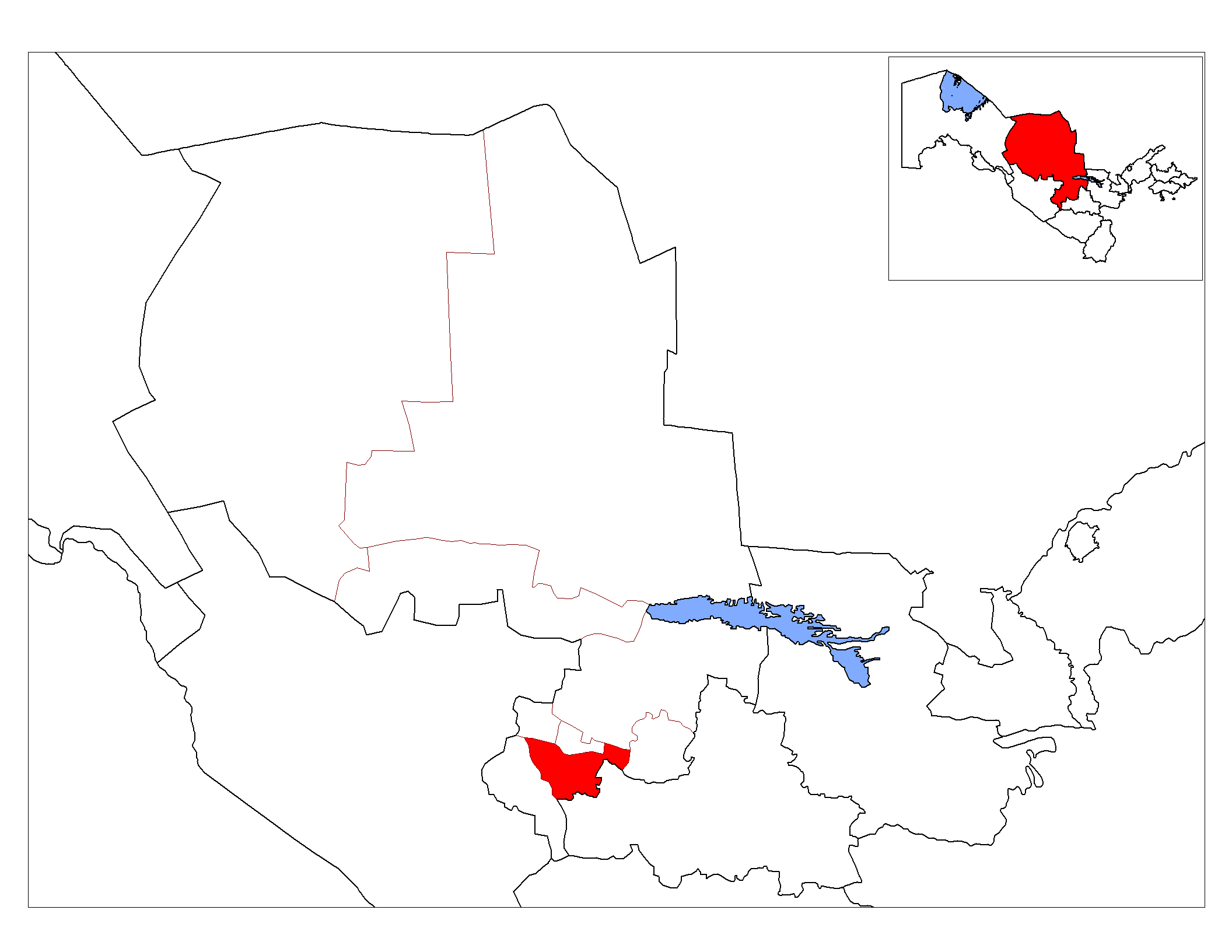
- Country: Uzbekistan
- Region: Navoiy Region
- Capital: Karmana

Area
  - Total: 950 km^{2} (370 sq mi)

Population (2021)
  - Total: 128,200
  - Density: 130/km^{2} (350/sq mi)
- Time zone: UTC+5 (UZT)

Karmana District (Uzbek: Karmana tumani, before 2003: Navoiy District) is a district of Navoiy Region in Uzbekistan. The capital lies at the town Karmana. It has an area of 950 km^{2} (370 sq mi) and its population is 128,200 (2021 est.). The district consists of 5 urban-type settlements (Karmana, Malikrabot, Paxtaobod, Podkoron, Kamolot, Yoshlik) and 7 rural communities (Uyrot, Doʻrmon, Narpay, Xazora, Yangiariq, Jaloyir).
