= Navoiy Region =

Region of Uzbekistan

Navoiy Region Навоий вилояти / Navoiy viloyati (Uzbek)
- Region
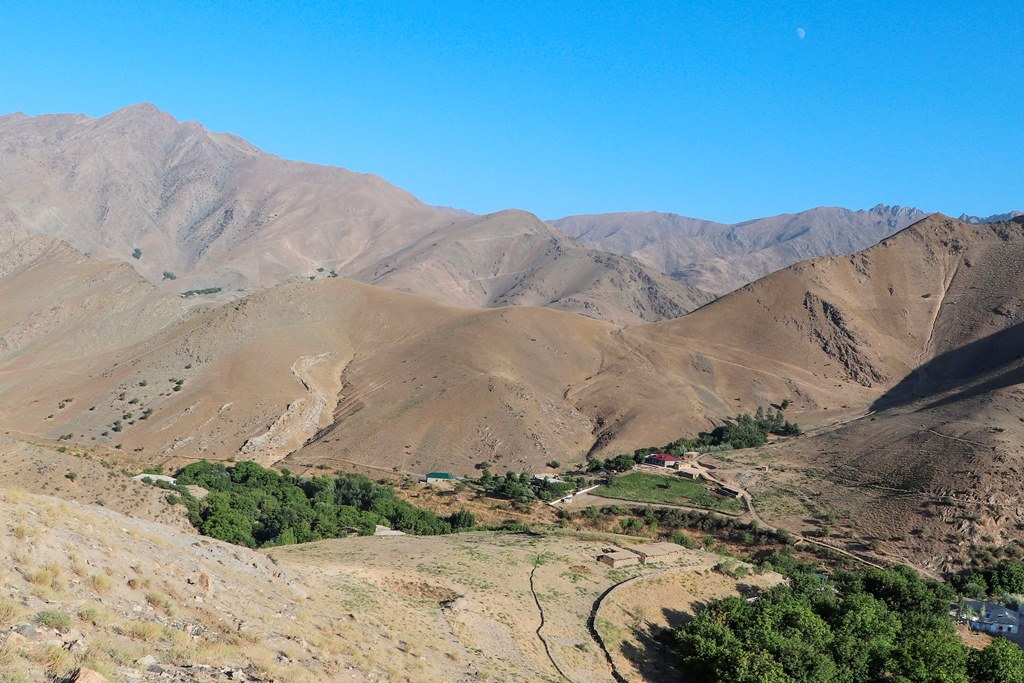
- Sentob Valley

- Navoiy in Uzbekistan
- Coordinates: 42°0′N 64°15′E
- Country: Uzbekistan
- Capital: Navoiy

Government
  - Hokim: Normat Tursunov

Area
  - Total: 111,095 km^{2} (42,894 sq mi)
- Elevation: 126 m (413 ft)

Population (2022)
  - Total: 1,033,857
  - Density: 9.30606/km^{2} (24.1026/sq mi)
- Time zone: UTC+5 (East)
  - Summer (DST): UTC+5 (not observed)
- ISO 3166 code: UZ-NW
- Districts: 8
- Cities: 7
- Towns: 46
- Villages: 582
- Website: www.navoi.uz

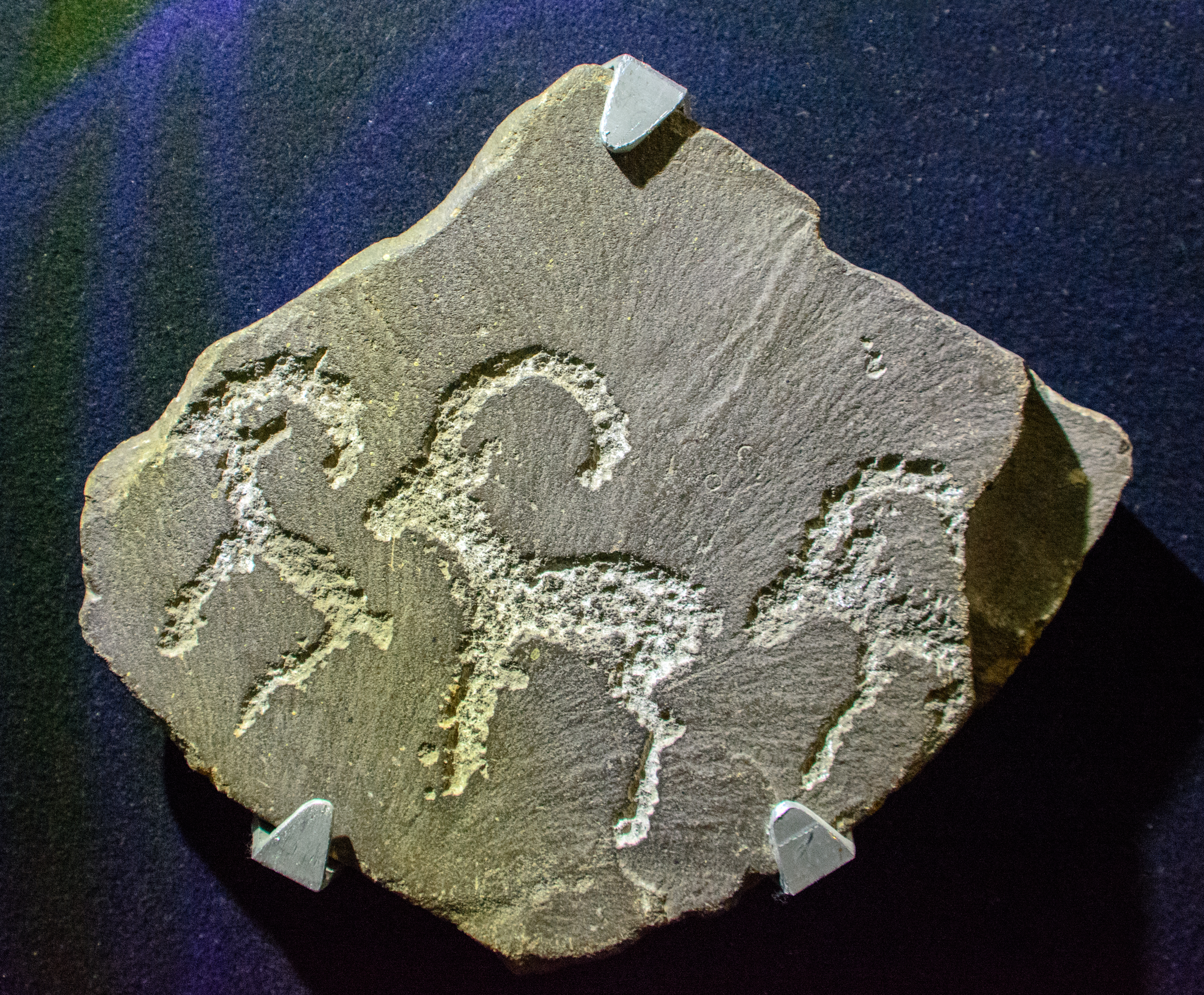
Sarmishsay (Navoi Region) Rock Art 3rd millennium BCE

Navoiy Region (Note: Uzbek: Навоий вилояти, romanized: Navoiy viloyati, IPA: [næʋɔˈij ʋɪ̆lɔˌjæˈtʰɪ̆]; Tajik: вилояти Навоӣ, romanized: viloyati Navoiy; Karakalpak: Наўайы ўәлаяты, romanized: Nawayı wálayatı; Kazakh: Науаи облысы, romanized: Nauai oblysy) (Note: Formerly called Navoiy Oblast (from Russian Навоийская область).) is one of the regions of Uzbekistan. It is located in the central north/northwest of the country. It covers an area of 111,095 km^{2} (42,894 sq mi) (a large part of which is taken up by the Kyzyl-Kum desert), which makes it the largest of the regions of Uzbekistan (the autonomous Karakalpakstan Republic is still larger at 166,590 km^{2}). The Navoiy region borders with Kazakhstan, Samarqand Region, Buxoro Region, Jizzakh Region, and the Karakalpakstan Republic. The population is estimated to be 1,033,857 in 2022, with 51% living in rural areas. The capital is Navoiy (pop. ~146,900). The region and its capital are named after the poet Ali-Shir Nava'i.

The Navoi region, located in the centre of the Republic of Uzbekistan, is the youngest and, at the same time, the largest region in the Republic. The Navoi region was established in 1982. Before that, these areas were part of Samarkand and Bukhara regions. For this reason, the Navoi region has its own ancient historical monuments.

The climate is a typically semi-desert continental climate. Navoiy region has significant natural resources, especially natural gas, petroleum, and precious metals, plus raw materials for construction. The region's economy is heavily dependent on large mining, metallurgical and chemical production complexes. The Navoi and Zarafshan mines produce some of the world's purest gold.

Leading agricultural products are cotton and Karakul sheep. Some 90% of the entire area is considered potentially rich agricultural land, if a source of water for irrigation can be located.

== Administrative divisions ==
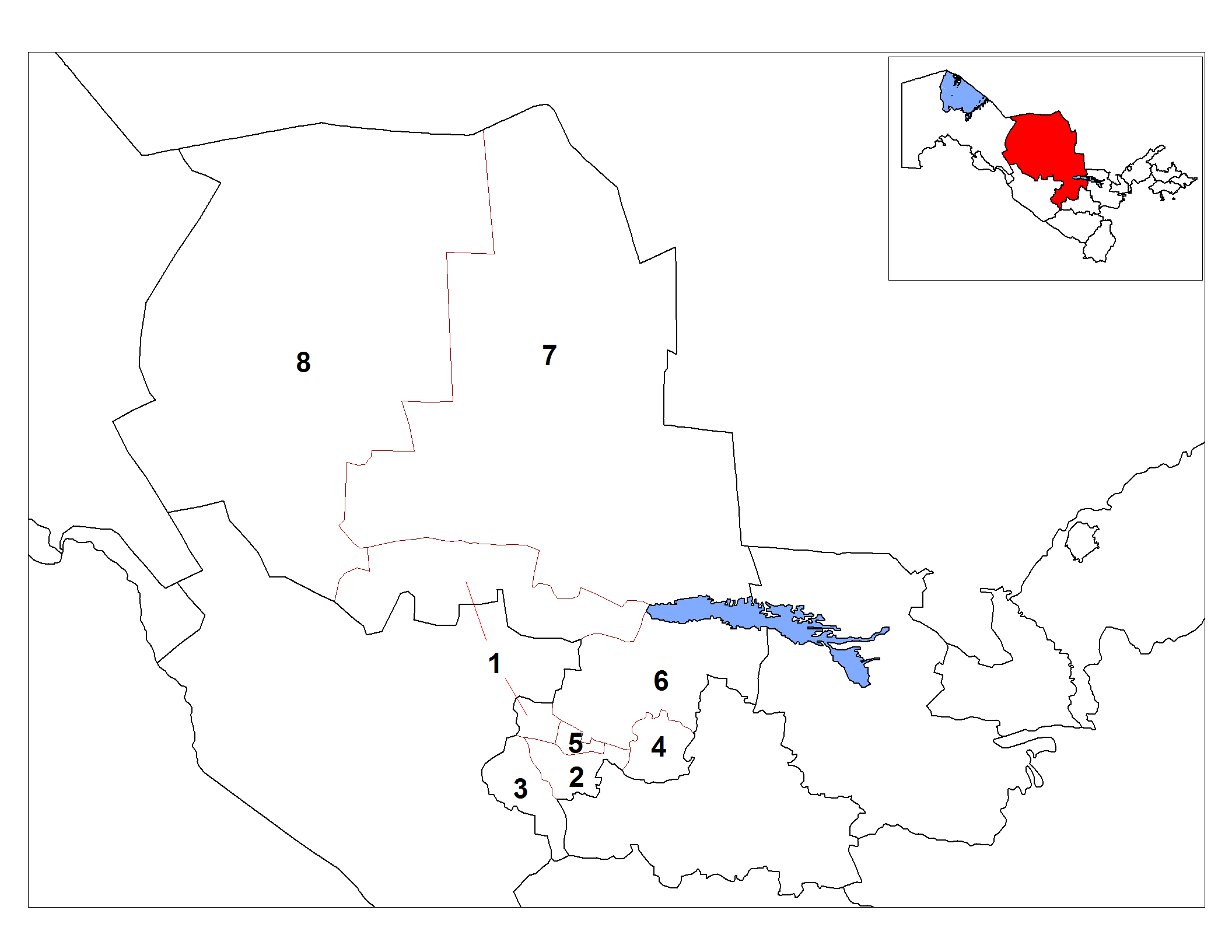
Districts of Navoiy

The Navoiy Region consists of 8 districts (listed below) and 3 district-level cities: Navoiy, Zarafshon and Gʻozgʻon.

Key	District name	District capital
1	Konimex District	Konimex
2	Qiziltepa District	Qiziltepa
3	Xatirchi District	Yangirabod
4	Navbahor District	Beshrabot
5	Karmana District	Karmana
6	Nurota District	Nurota
7	Tomdi District	Tomdibuloq
8	Uchquduq District	Uchquduq

There are 7 cities (Navoiy, Zarafshon, Gʻozgʻon, Qiziltepa, Nurota, Uchquduq, Yangirabod) and 46 urban-type settlements in Navoiy Region.

== Economy ==
Navoiy Region is located in the central part of Uzbekistan, being one of the largest industrial centres of the country. The region possesses rich minerals and raw materials resources – Muruntau gold-bearing field, silica sand fields (of more than 1.5 billion tons), deposits of granite (1.9 billion cubic meters), marble (420 million cubic meters), phosphorites (1.5 billion tons) and many others.

Navoiy Mining and Metallurgy Combinat – the biggest enterprise of the region, is included in top ten largest world producers of uranium and gold (9999 standard). Gold bars produced by the Combinat are awarded with the status of “optimal gold delivery” by London Precious Metals Market and Tokyo Commodities Exchange. Along with mining, the region’s economy is based on production of building materials, chemical, textile and food industries.

40 foreign investment enterprises operate in Navoiy Region. Most of them are established with participation of investors from China, Russia, the United States, and the United Kingdom. The Uzbek–British Joint Venture "Amantaytau-Goldfields" does work in the region.

In 2019 the entire region was made a "free economic zone" by presidential decree.

== Main sights ==
The Mausoleum of Sheikh Khoja Khisrav is a pilgrimage site located in the Karmana District of Navoiy Region. Khoja Khisrav was a saint who lived during the 14th century, alongside Mawlana Orif Deggaroni and Khwaja Bakhouddin. Information about the life, activities, and miracles of Khoja Khisrav can be found in the book "Bahouddin Balogardon" by Abul Musin Muhammad Boqir Ibn Muhammad Ali.
