= Districts of Uzbekistan =

The regions (viloyat) of Uzbekistan are divided into 175 districts (tuman). The districts are listed by regions, in the general direction from the west to the east.

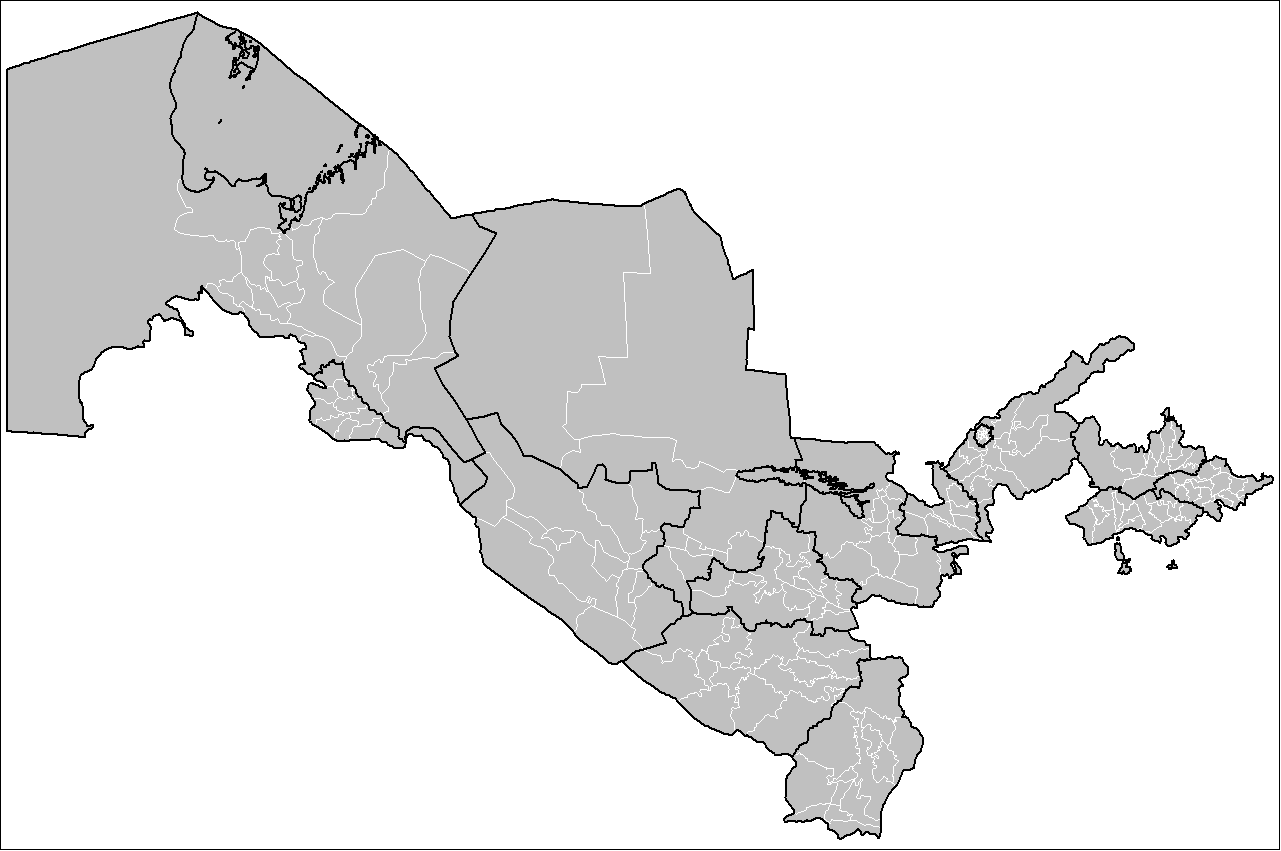
Okresi of Uzbekistan

== Karakalpakstan ==
Districts of Karakalpakstan

Key	District name	District capital
1	Nókis city (Note: District-level city.)	
2	Amiwdárya district	Mańǵıt
3	Beruniy district	Beruniy
4	Bozataw district	Bozataw
5	Qanlikól district	Qanlıkól
6	Qaraózek district	Qaraózek
7	Kegeyli district	Kegeyli
8	Qońirat district	Qońırat
9	Moynaq district	Moynaq
10	Nókis district	Aqmańǵıt
11	Taqiyatas district	Taqiyatas
12	Taxtakópir district	Taxtakópir
13	Tórtkúl district	Tórtkúl
14	Xojeli district	Xojeli
15	Shimbay district	Shımbay
16	Shomanay district	Shomanay
17	Ellikqala district	Bostan

== Xorazm ==
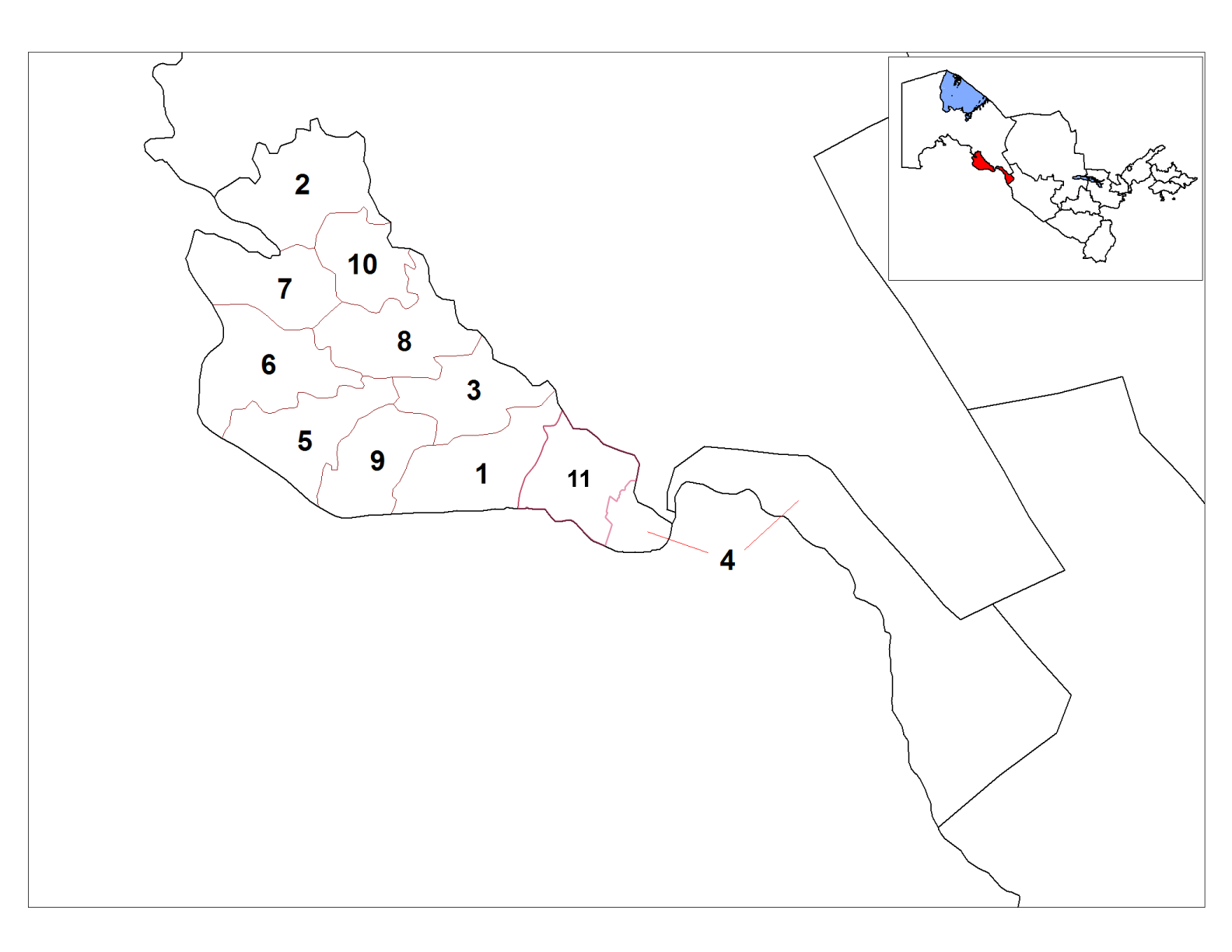
Districts of Xorazm before 2020

Key	District name	District capital
1	Bogʻot District	Bogʻot
2	Gurlan District	Gurlan
3	Xonqa District	Xonqa
4	Hazorasp District	Hazorasp
5	Khiva District	Khiva
6	Qoʻshkoʻpir District	Qoʻshkoʻpir
7	Shovot District	Shovot
8	Urganch District	Qorovul
9	Yangiariq District	Yangiariq
10	Yangibozor District	Yangibozor
11	Tuproqqalʼa District	Pitnak

== Navoiy ==
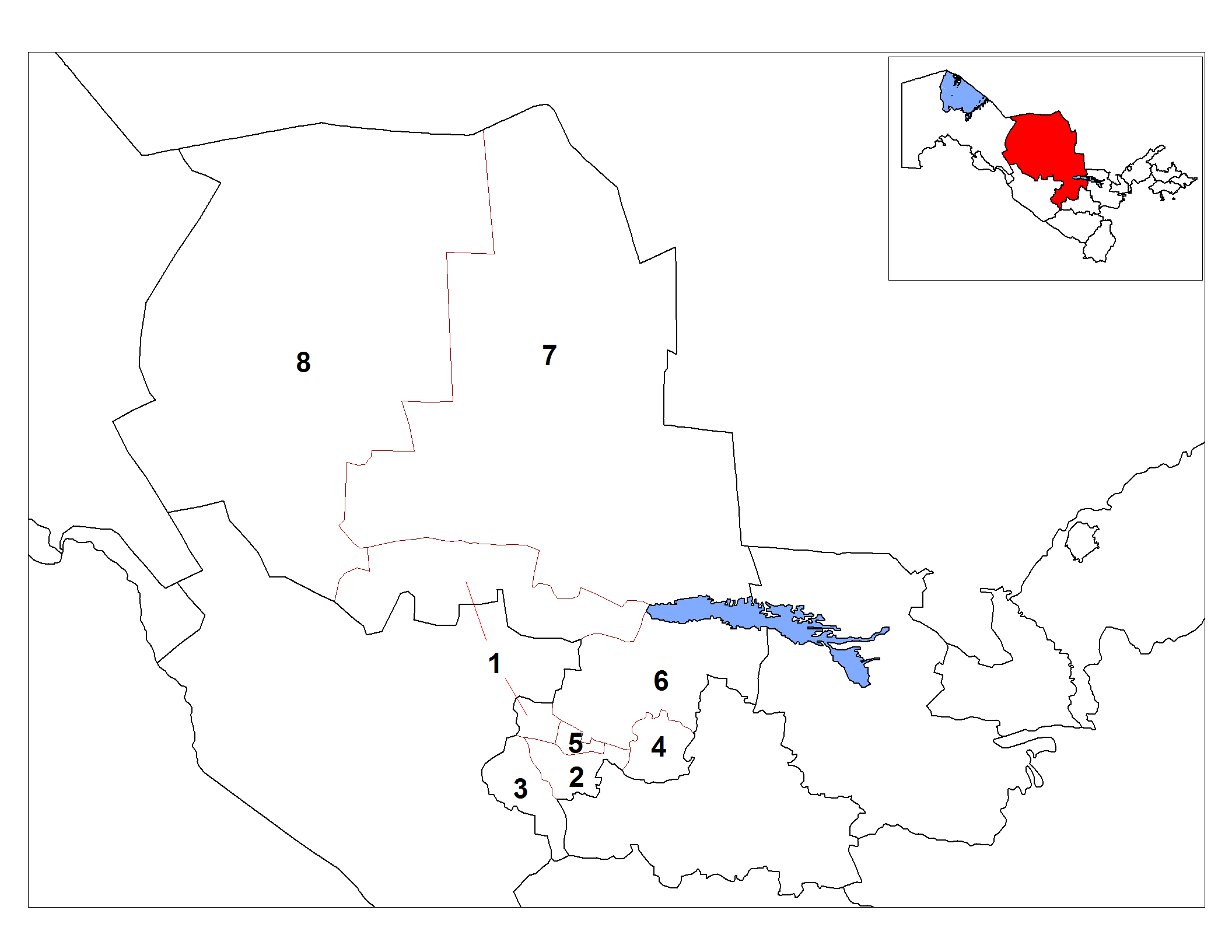
Districts of Navoiy

Key	District name	District capital
1	Konimex District	Konimex
2	Qiziltepa District	Qiziltepa
3	Xatirchi District	Yangirabod
4	Navbahor District	Beshrabot
5	Karmana District	Karmana
6	Nurota District	Nurota
7	Tomdi District	Tomdibuloq
8	Uchquduq District	Uchquduq

== Bukhara ==
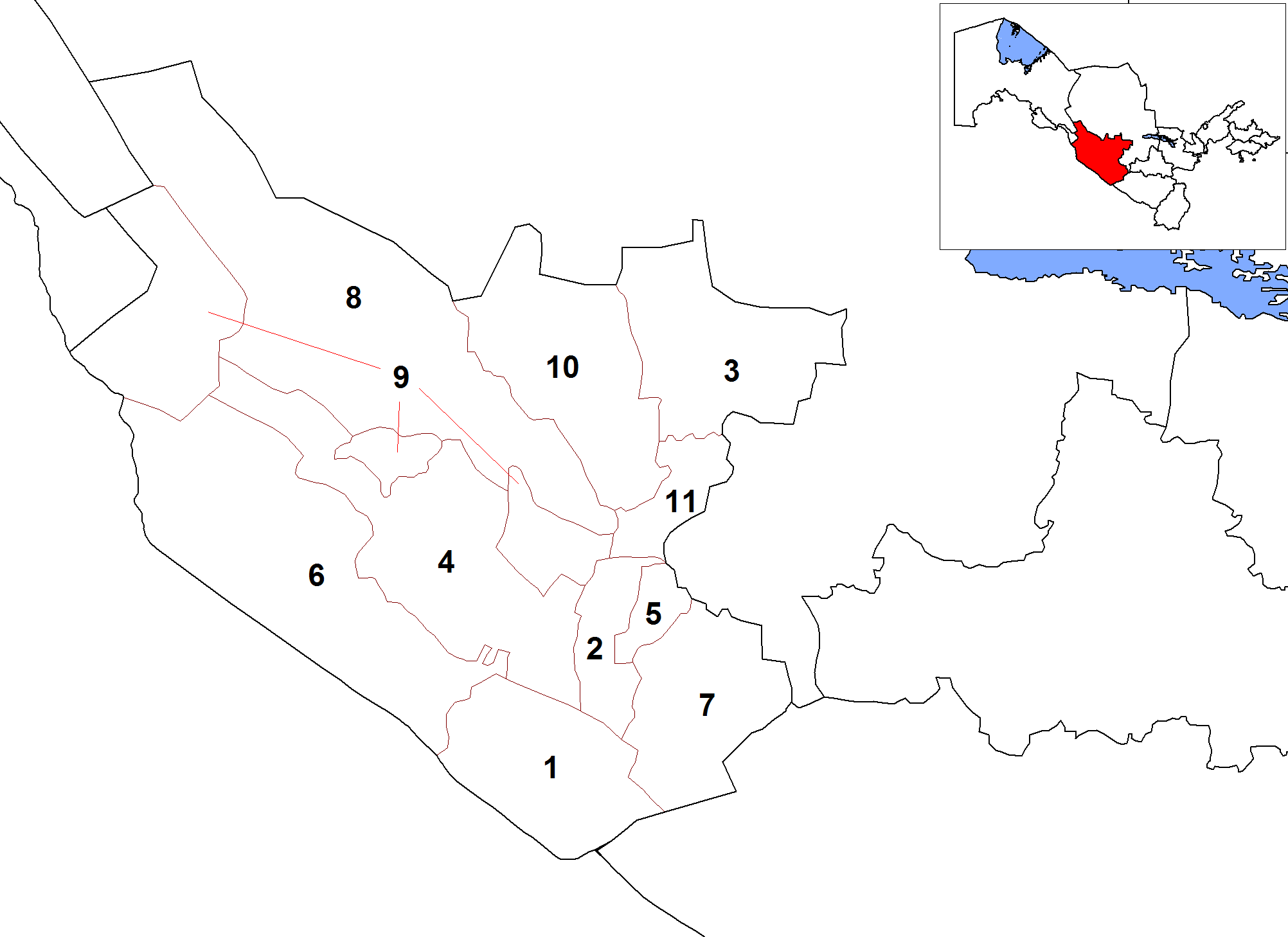
Districts of Bukhara

Key	District name	District capital
1	Olot District	Olot
2	Bukhara District	Galaosiyo
3	Gʻijduvon District	Gʻijduvon
4	Jondor District	Jondor
5	Kogon District	Kogon
6	Qorakoʻl District	Qorakoʻl
7	Qorovulbozor District	Qorovulbozor
8	Peshku District	Yangibozor
9	Romitan District	Romitan
10	Shofirkon District	Shofirkon
11	Vobkent District	Vobkent

== Samarqand ==
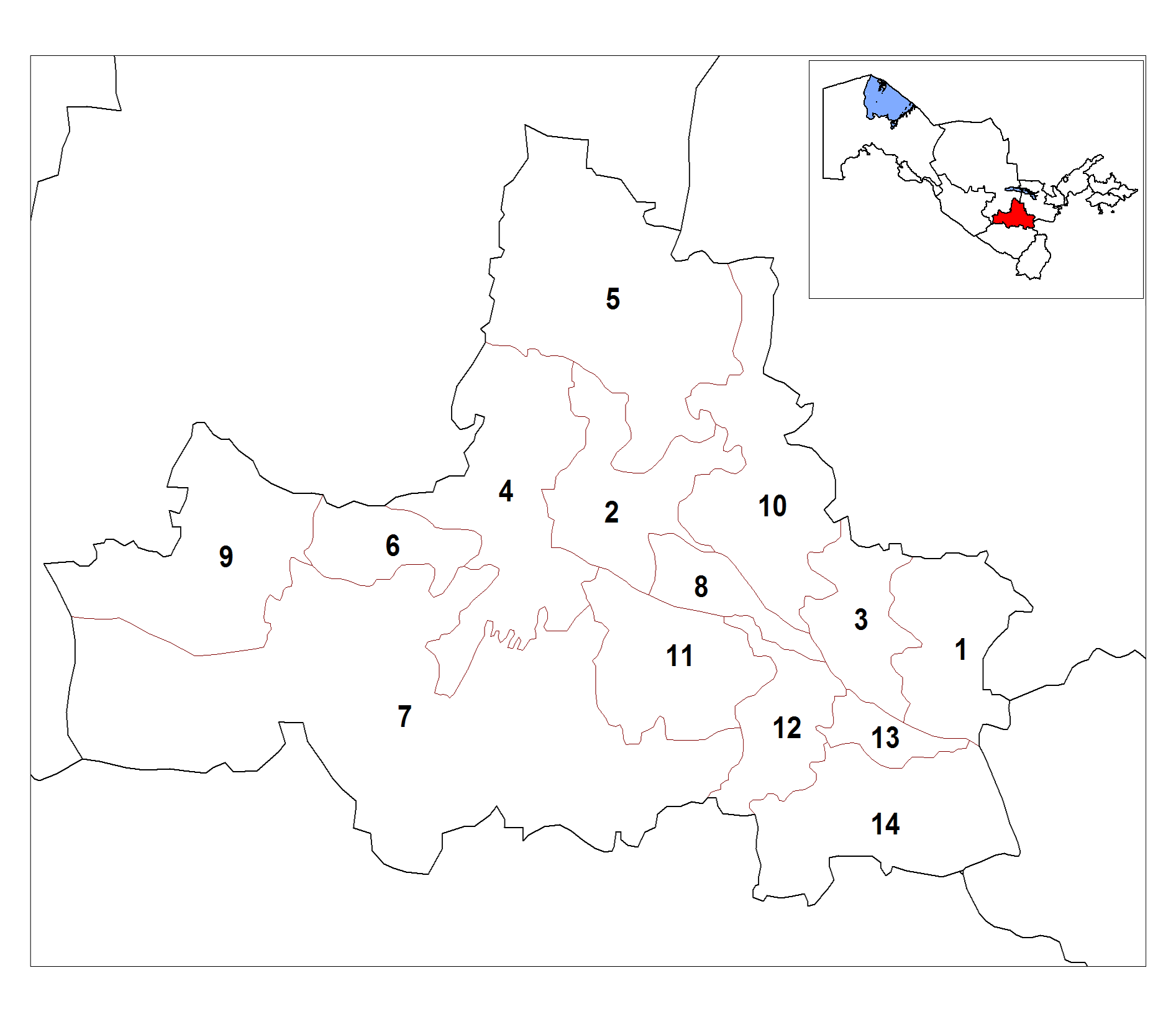
Districts of Samarqand

Key	District name	District capital
1	Bulungʻur District	Bulungʻur
2	Ishtixon District	Ishtixon
3	Jomboy District	Jomboy
4	Kattakurgan District	Payshanba
5	Qoʻshrabot District	Qoʻshrabot
6	Narpay District	Oqtosh
7	Nurobod District	Nurobod
8	Oqdaryo District	Loyish
9	Paxtachi District	Ziyovuddin
10	Payariq District	Payariq
11	Pastdargʻom District	Juma
12	Samarqand District	Gulobod
13	Toyloq District	Toyloq
14	Urgut District	Urgut

== Qashqadaryo ==
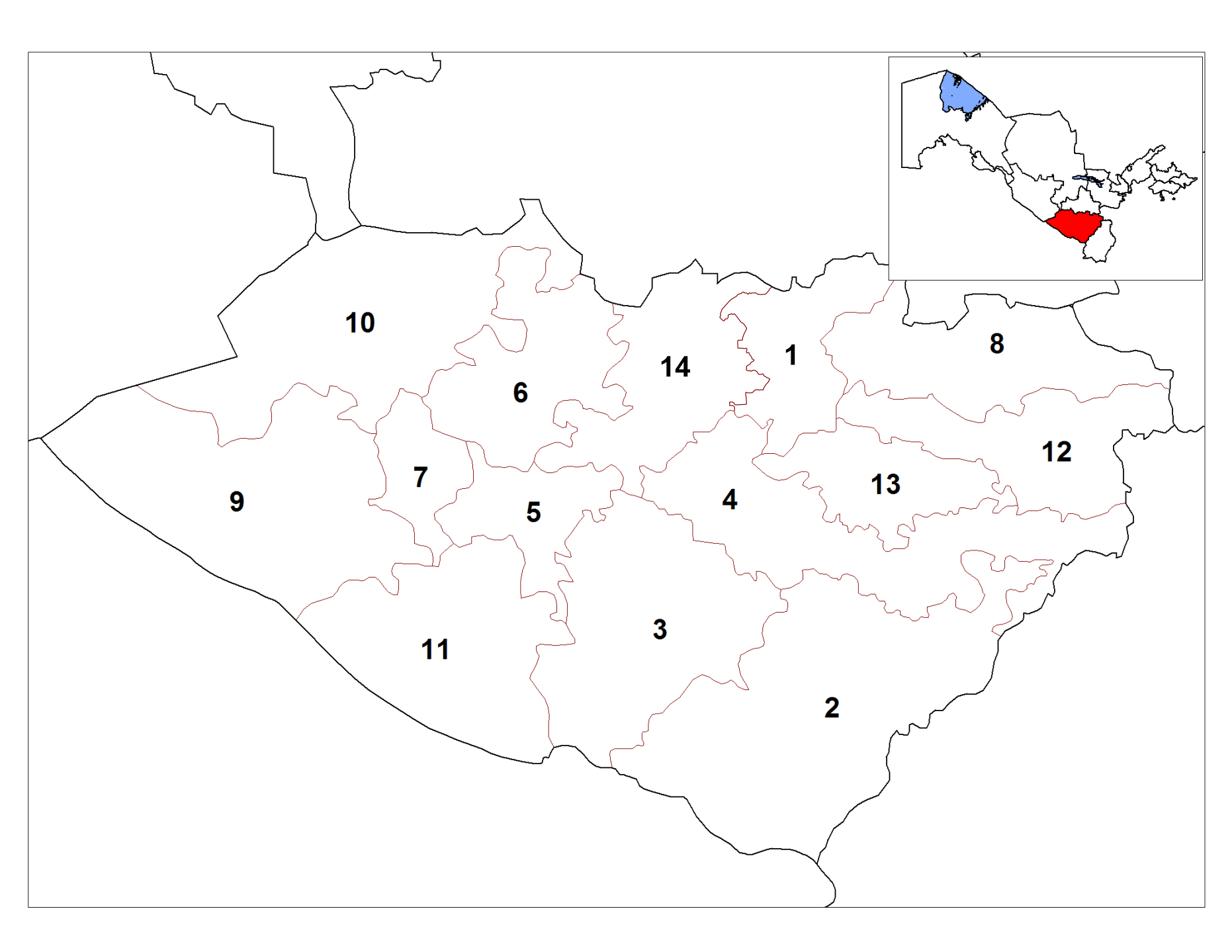
Districts of Qashqadaryo

Key	District name	District capital
1	Chiroqchi District	Chiroqchi
2	Dehqonobod District	Karashina
3	Gʻuzor District	Gʻuzor
4	Qamashi District	Qamashi
5	Qarshi District	Beshkent
6	Koson District	Koson
7	Kasbi District	Mugʻlon
8	Kitob District	Kitob
9	Mirishkor District	Yangi Mirishkor
10	Muborak District	Muborak
11	Nishon District	Yangi Nishon
12	Shakhrisabz District	Shahrisabz
13	Yakkabogʻ District	Yakkabogʻ
14	Kokdala District	Koʻkdala

== Surxondaryo ==
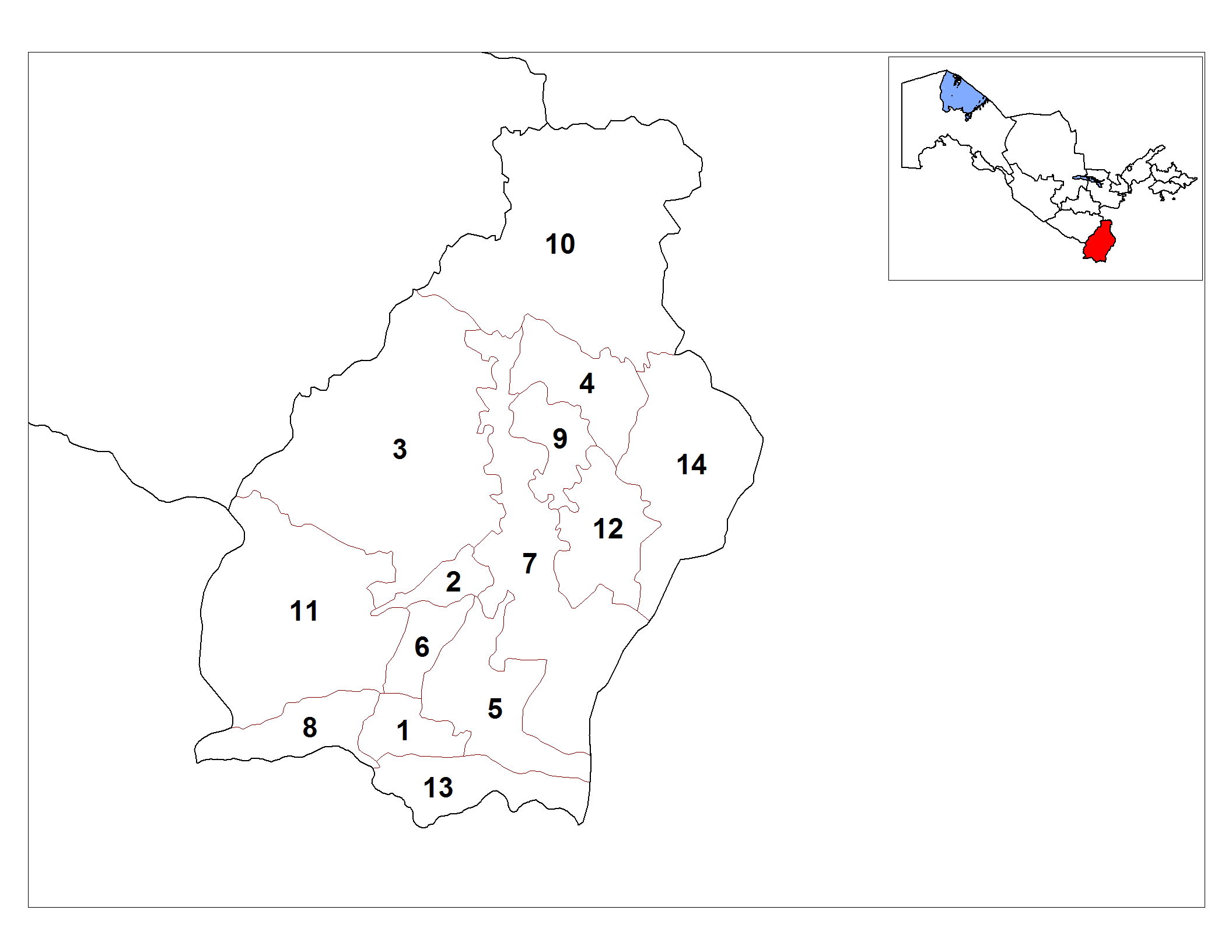
Districts of Surxondaryo

Key	District name	District capital
1	Angor District	Angor
2	Bandixon District	Bandixon
3	Boysun District	Boysun
4	Denov District	Denov (Denau)
5	Jarqoʻrgʻon District	Jarqoʻrgʻon
6	Qiziriq District	Sariq
7	Qumqoʻrgʻon District	Qumqoʻrgʻon
8	Muzrabot District	Xalqobod (Khalkabad)
9	Oltinsoy District	Qarluq
10	Sariosiyo District	Sariosiyo
11	Sherobod District	Sherobod
12	Shoʻrchi District	Shoʻrchi
13	Termiz District	Uchqizil
14	Uzun District	Uzun

== Jizzakh ==
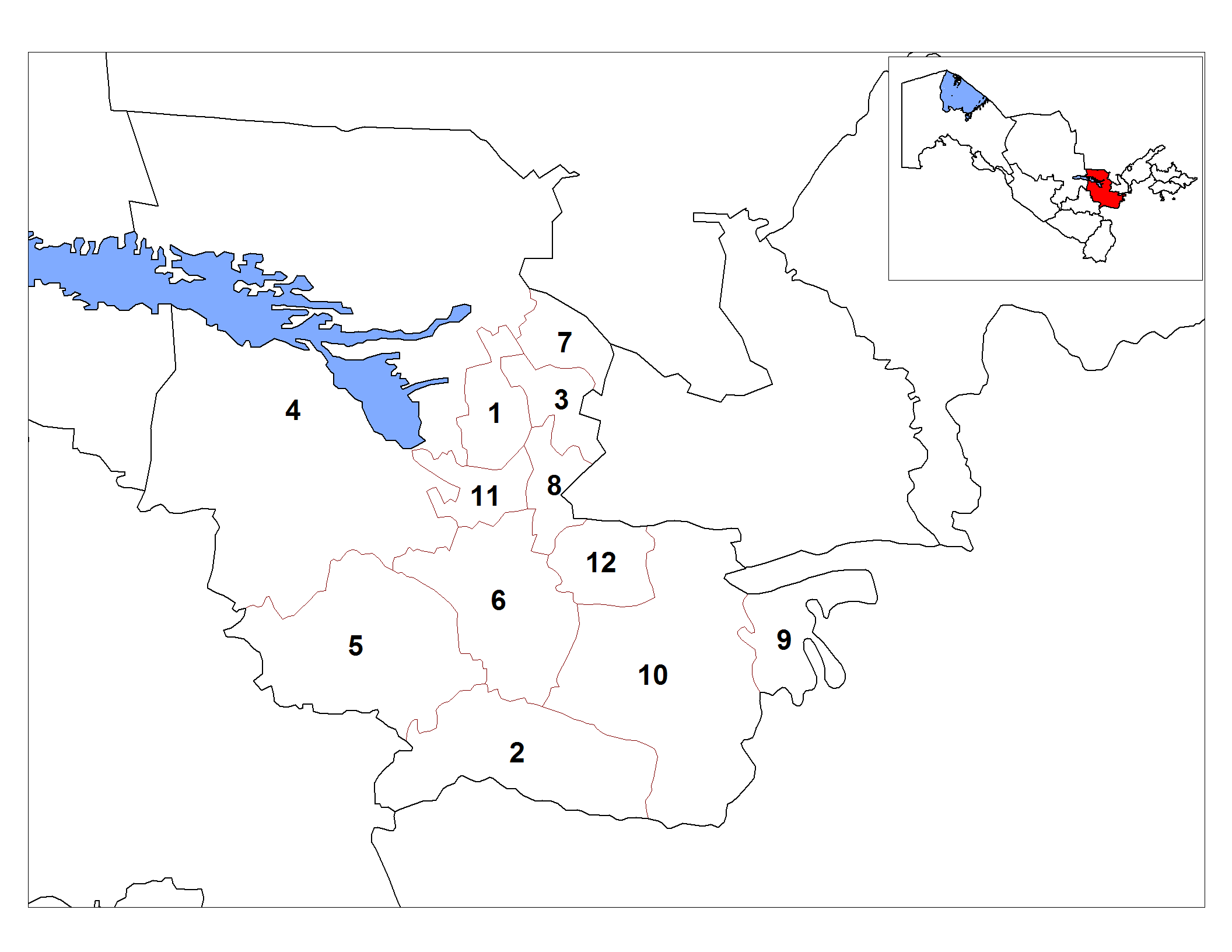
Districts of Jizzakh

Key	District name	District capital
1	Arnasoy District	Gʻoliblar
2	Baxmal District	Oʻsmat
3	Doʻstlik District	Doʻstlik
4	Forish District	Bogʻdon
5	Gʻallaorol District	Gʻallaorol
6	Sharof Rashidov District	Uchtepa
7	Mirzachoʻl District	Gagarin
8	Paxtakor District	Paxtakor
9	Yangiobod District	Balandchaqir
10	Zomin District	Zomin
11	Zafarobod District	Zafarobod
12	Zarbdor District	Zarbdor

== Sirdaryo ==
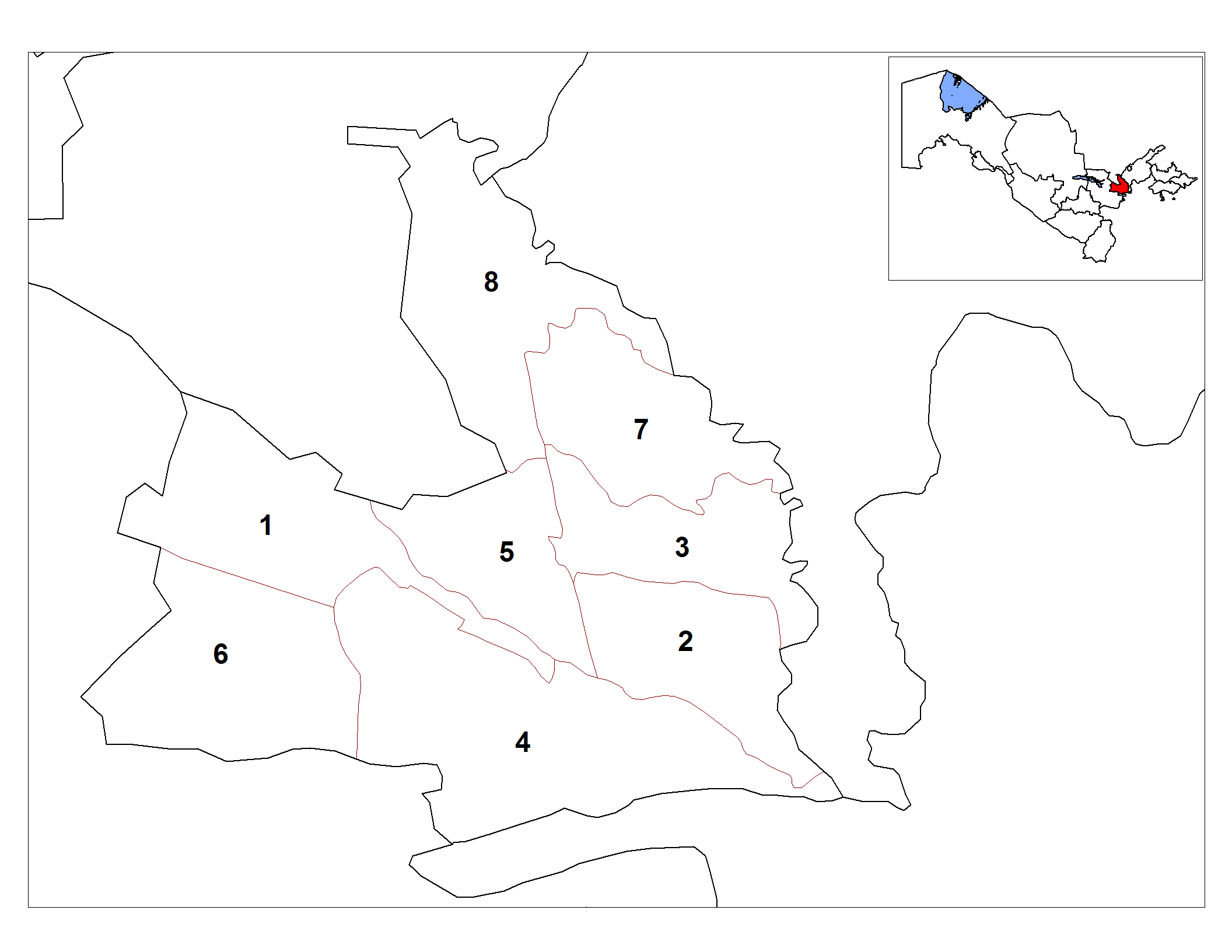
Districts of Sirdaryo

Key	District name	District capital
1	Oqoltin District	Sardoba
2	Boyovut District	Boyovut
3	Guliston District	Dehqonobod
4	Xovos District	Xovos
5	Mirzaobod District	Navroʻz
6	Sardoba District	Paxtaobod
7	Sayxunobod District	Sayxun
8	Sirdaryo District	Sirdaryo

== Tashkent ==
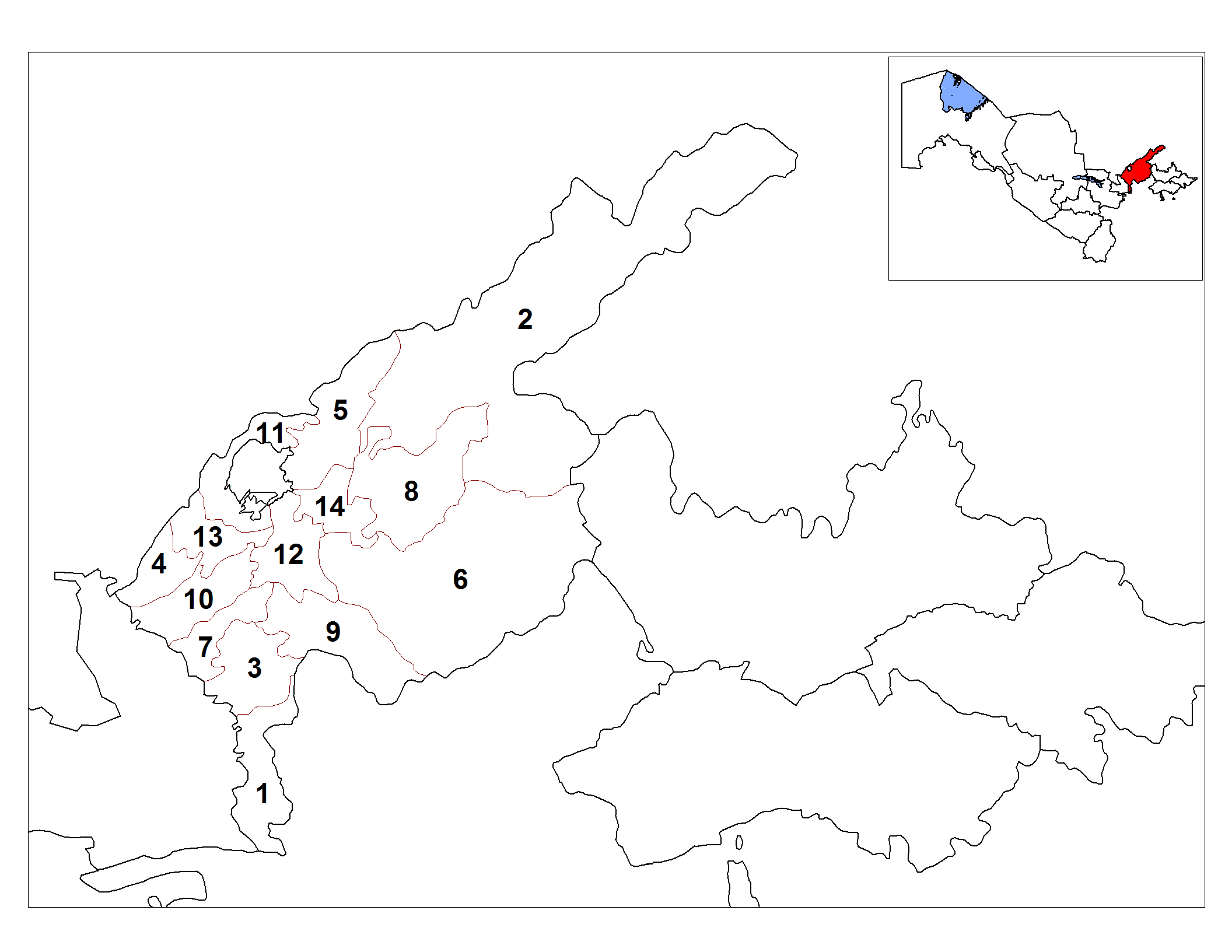
Districts of Tashkent

Key	District name	District capital
1	Bekabad District	Zafar
2	Boʻstonliq District	Gʻazalkent
3	Boʻka District	Boʻka
4	Chinoz District	Chinoz
5	Qibray District	Qibray
6	Ohangaron District	Olhangaron
7	Oqqoʻrgʻon District	Oqqoʻrgʻon
8	Parkent District	Parkent
9	Piskent District	Piskent
10	Quyichirchiq District	Doʻstobod
11	Zangiota District	Eshonguzar
12	Oʻrtachirchiq District	Nurafshon
13	Yangiyoʻl District	Yangiyoʻl
14	Yuqorichirchiq District	Yangibozor
15	Tashkent District	Keles

== Namangan ==
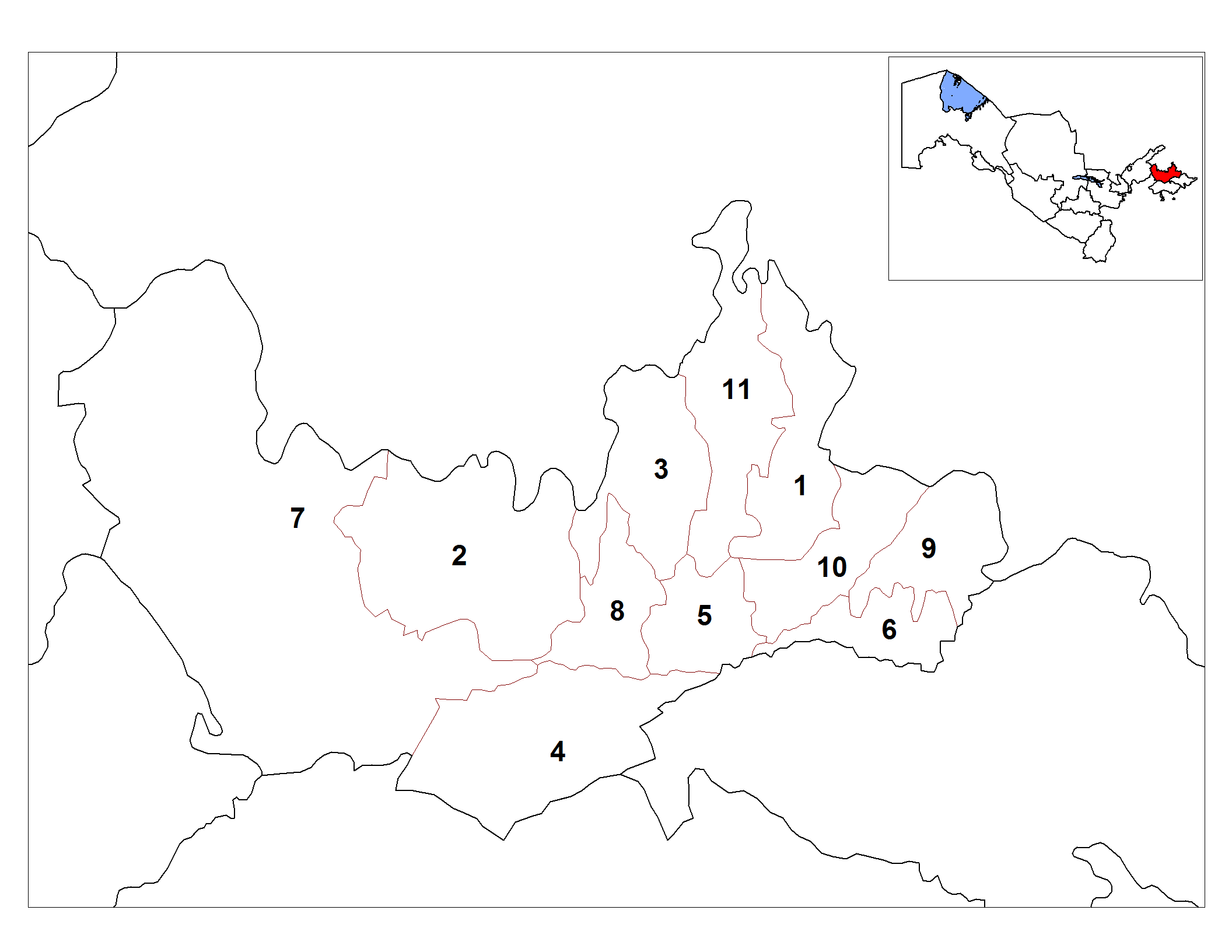
Districts of Namangan

Key	District name	District capital
1	Chortoq District	Chortoq
2	Chust District	Chust
3	Kosonsoy District	Kosonsoy
4	Mingbuloq District	Joʻmashoʻy
5	Namangan District	Toshbuloq
6	Norin District	Haqqulobod
7	Pop District	Pop
8	Toʻraqoʻrgʻon District	Toʻraqoʻrgʻon
9	Uchqoʻrgʻon District	Uchqoʻrgʻon
10	Uychi District	Uychi
11	Yangiqoʻrgʻon District	Yangiqoʻrgʻon

== Fergana ==
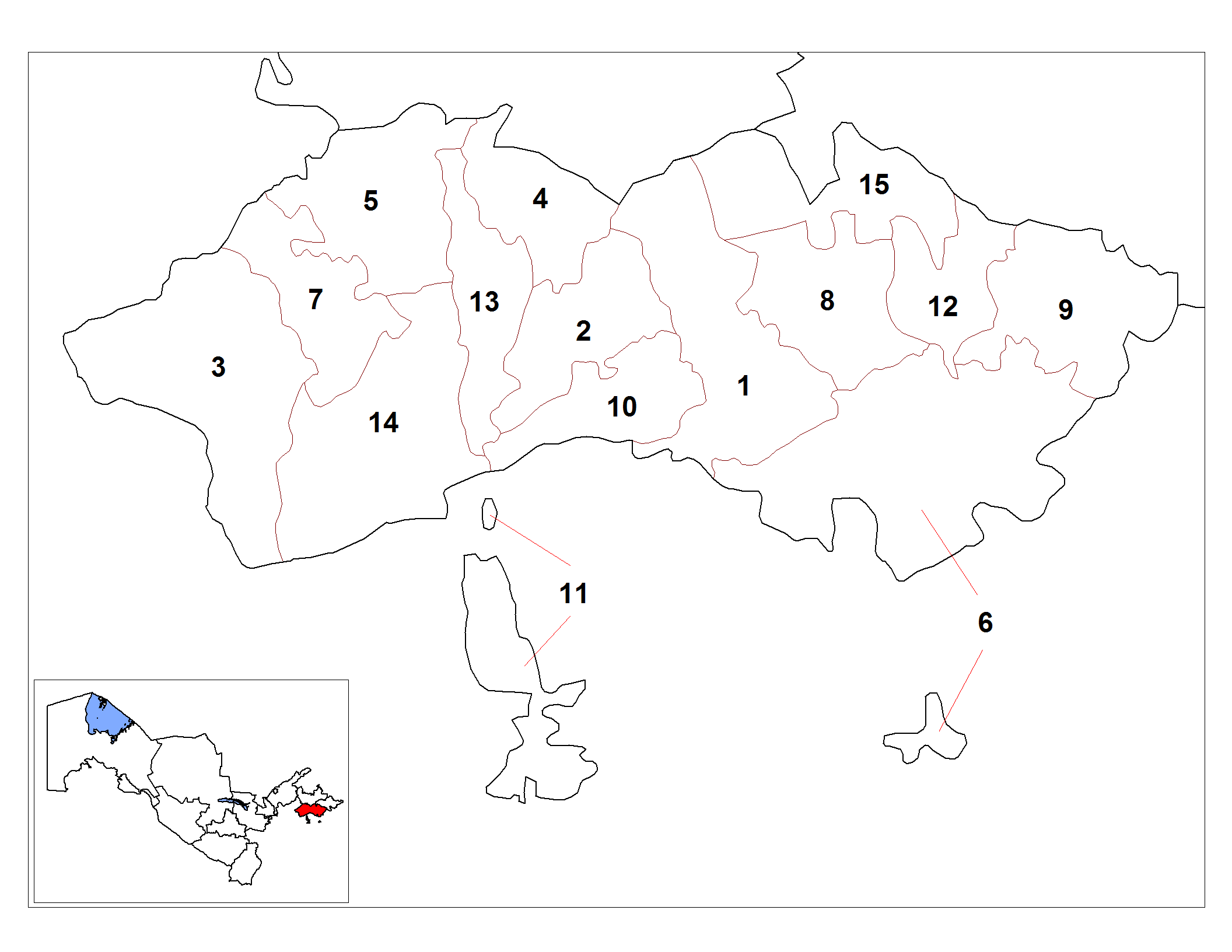
Districts of Fergana

Key	District name	District capital
1	Oltiariq District	Oltiariq
2	Bagʻdod District	Bagʻdod
3	Beshariq District	Beshariq
4	Buvayda District	Ibrat
5	Dangʻara District	Dangʻara
6	Fergana District	Chimyon
7	Furqat District	Navbahor
8	Qoʻshtepa District	Langar
9	Quva District	Quva
10	Rishton District	Rishton
11	Soʻx District	Ravon
12	Toshloq District	Toshloq
13	Uchkoʻprik District	Uchkoʻprik
14	Uzbekistan District	Yaypan
15	Yozyovon District	Yozyovon

Ohunboboev District was renamed to Qoʻshtepa District in August 2010.

== Andijan ==
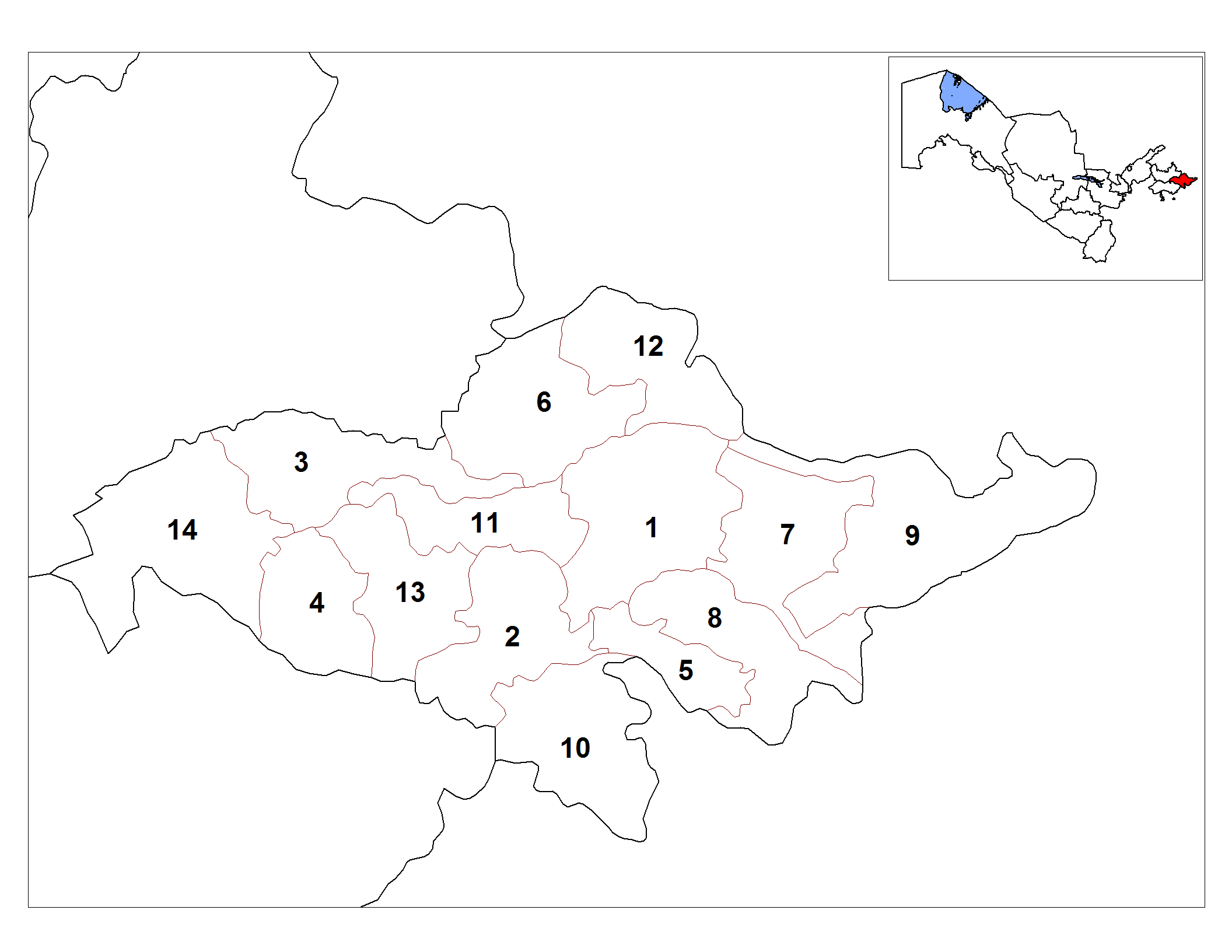
Districts of Andijan

Key	District name	District capital
1	Andijan District	Kuyganyor
2	Asaka District	Asaka
3	Baliqchi District	Baliqchi
4	Boʻston District	Boʻz
5	Buloqboshi District	Buloqboshi
6	Izboskan District	Poytugʻ
7	Jalaquduq District	Jalaquduq
8	Xoʻjaobod District	Xoʻjaobod
9	Qoʻrgʻontepa District	Qoʻrgʻontepa
10	Marhamat District	Marhamat
11	Oltinkoʻl District	Oltinkol
12	Paxtaobod District	Paxtaobod
13	Shahrixon District	Shahrixon
14	Ulugʻnor District	Oqoltin

== Tashkent City ==
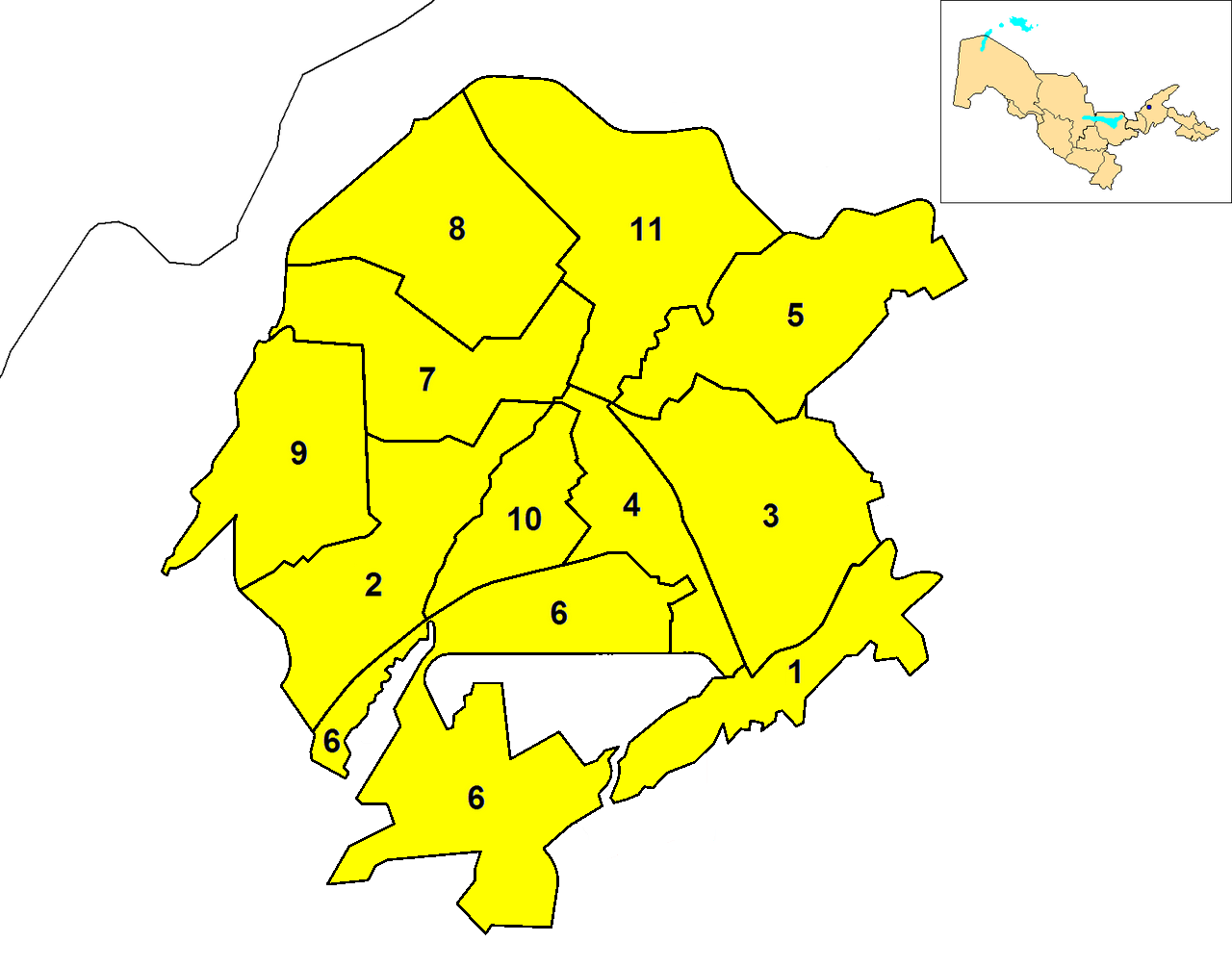
Districts of Tashkent City before 2020

Since 2020, when the Yangihayot district was created, Tashkent is divided into 12 districts.

Key	District
1	Bektemir
2	Chilanzar
3	Yashnobod
4	Mirobod
5	Mirzo Ulugbek
6	Sergeli
7	Shayxontoxur
8	Olmazor
9	Uchtepa
10	Yakkasaray
11	Yunusabad
12	Yangihayot
