= Murad Buildings =

Uzbek real estate developer

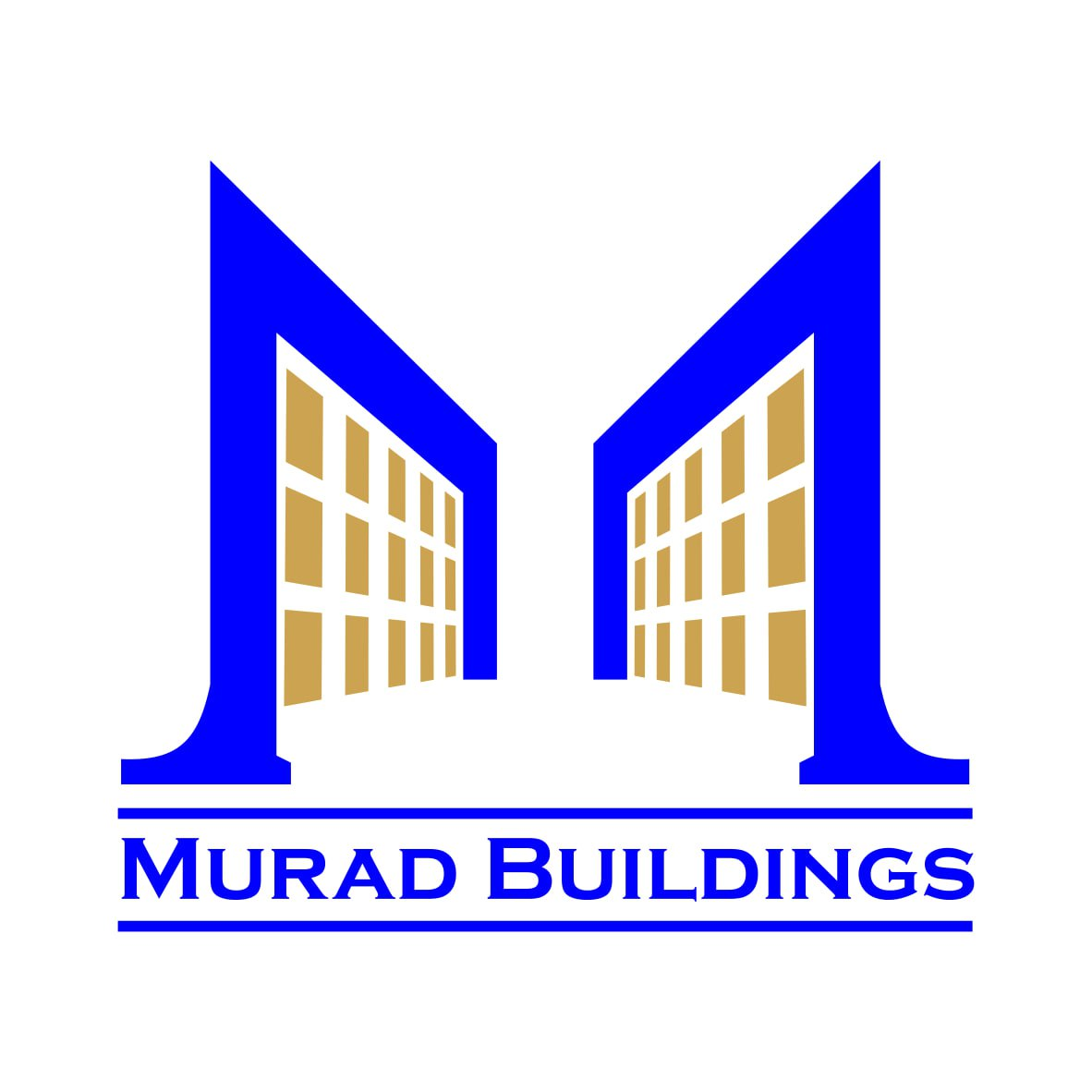
- Type: Public
- Industry: Real estate
- Founded: 2002
- Founder: Murod Nazarov
- Headquarters: Tashkent
- Area served: Uzbekistan
- Key people: Murod Nazarov
- Products: Milenum; Avalon; Central; Koʻkcha Kurgani; Amir Temur; Green City; Felicita; Doʻstlar; U-tower; Nest One
- Website: www.mbc.uz

Murad Buildings is an Uzbek multinational development company located in Uzbekistan. Murad Buildings is one of the largest real estate developers in Uzbekistan, known for Nest One, the tallest building in Uzbekistan, and other major projects.

== History ==
Murad Buildings was founded in 2002 by Muradxon Nazarov as an interior and exterior decoration firm in Uzbekistan. The company has expanded its presence with developments and investments in Turkey, Kazakhstan and Uzbekistan.

The company invested $200 million crore in Nest One in 2019, a residential complex.

They have achieved growth with backward integration in the construction and real estate development business in Uzbekistan. Their long-term activity includes the construction of residences, hotels, offices, and other facilities.

== Projects ==
The most important projects implemented by the company:

- Milenum is a residential project located in the Yunusabad district of the city of Tashkent. The number of residences is estimated at 3,533 units, with an area of 465,870 square meters.
- The Avalon project, located in Murabad district, has an area of 132,116 square meters, a business center project.
- "Central" premium class project located in Chilonzor district of Tashkent city is a residential project. The number of housing units is estimated at 359 units, with an area of 102,491 square meters.
- "Koʻkcha Kurgani" project, located in Shayxontoxur district of Tashkent city, is a residential project with an estimated number of 511 houses.
- In the "Amir Temur" project, located in Yunusabad district, the number of dwellings is 1,537, the total area is 212,933 square meters.
- The "Green City" project, located in Moradabad district, is a residential project with an area of 122,137 square meters.
- "Felicita" project located in Yakkasaray district, estimated number of 1221 residential projects.
- "Doʻstlar" project, located in Yunusabad district of Tashkent city, is a residential project with an estimated number of 480 houses.
- "U-tower" is located in the city of Tashkent in the district of Shayxontoxur and consists of 485 units divided into three parts according to the level of luxury.
- “Kislorod” is a residential project located in the Olmazor district of the city of Tashkent. The number of residences is estimated at 4,373 units, with an area of 565,278 square meters.
- In 2018, Murad Buildings signed a contract with the Turkish company Özgüven. The Nest One project will result in $200 million in construction contracts. The company's first project is the construction of a 51-story, 266.5-meter (874.34383 ft) tall residential complex known as Nest One in Tashkent.
- In the spring of 2023 a new business-class project «Regnum Plaza» was launched in the Mirzo-Ulugbek district of the city of Tashkent.
- In June 2023, the «Soy Bo'yi» project, located in the Uchtepa district of Tashkent, was started.

== Awards ==
=== Company awards ===
- Murad Buildings' Nest One project was recognized as the best of the year and awarded by the Government of Uzbekistan (2022)
- «Brand of the Year 2019» in the real estate category according to consumers.
- «Brand of the Year 2020» in the real estate category according to consumers.
- Murad Buildings Company "Best Employer - 2020"
- «Brand of the Year 2021» in the real estate category according to consumers.
- «Brand of the Year 2022» in the real estate category according to consumers.
- «Brand of the Year 2023» in the real estate category according to consumers.

=== Awards for projects ===
- Amir Timur — Best Memorial Complex, Uzbek Award (2016).
- Felicita Tashkent – Six World Class Design Awards (2018).
- Friends - Uzbekistan's Best Luxury Development Awards (2018).
