= Iltifot, Yashnobod =

Iltifot
- Neighbourhood
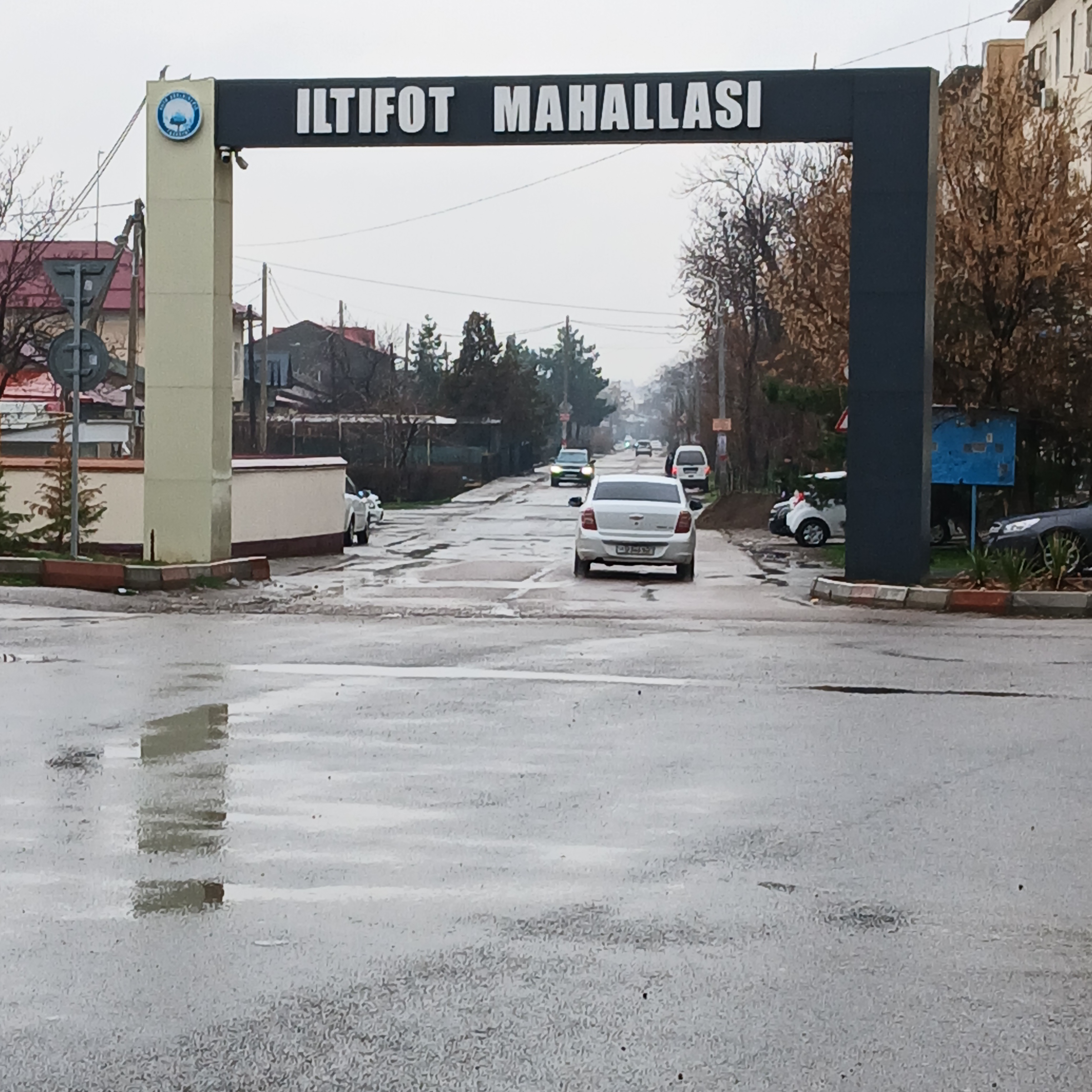
- Interactive map of Iltifot
- Coordinates: 41°16′49″N 69°21′19″E
- Country: Uzbekistan
- City: Tashkent
- District: Yashnobod District
- Time zone: UTC+5 (UZT)

Iltifot (Uzbek: Iltifot mahallasi) is a neighbourhood in the Yashnobod District of Tashkent, Uzbekistan.
