= Jumabozor =

- Location in Uzbekistan
- Coordinates: 40°20′30″N 69°15′10″E
- Country: Uzbekistan
- Region: Tashkent Region
- District: Bekabad District

Jumabozor (Uzbek: Жумабозор) is a village in eastern Uzbekistan. It is located in Bekabad District, Tashkent Region.
