= Ulugbek (town) =

- urban-type settlement
- Location in Uzbekistan
- Coordinates: 41°24′21″N 69°27′30″E
- Country: Uzbekistan
- City: Tashkent
- District: Mirzo Ulugbek District
- Urban-type settlement status: 1961

Population (1989)
  - Total: 7,800
- Time zone: UTC+5 (UZT)

Ulugbek (Uzbek: Ulugʻbek, Russian: Улугбек) is an urban-type settlement located in Tashkent Region, Uzbekistan. The population in 1989 was 7,800. The town is administratively subordinated to Mirzo Ulugbek District of Tashkent city. It is an exclave of Tashkent city, completely surrounded by Qibray District.
