= Doʻstobod =

- City
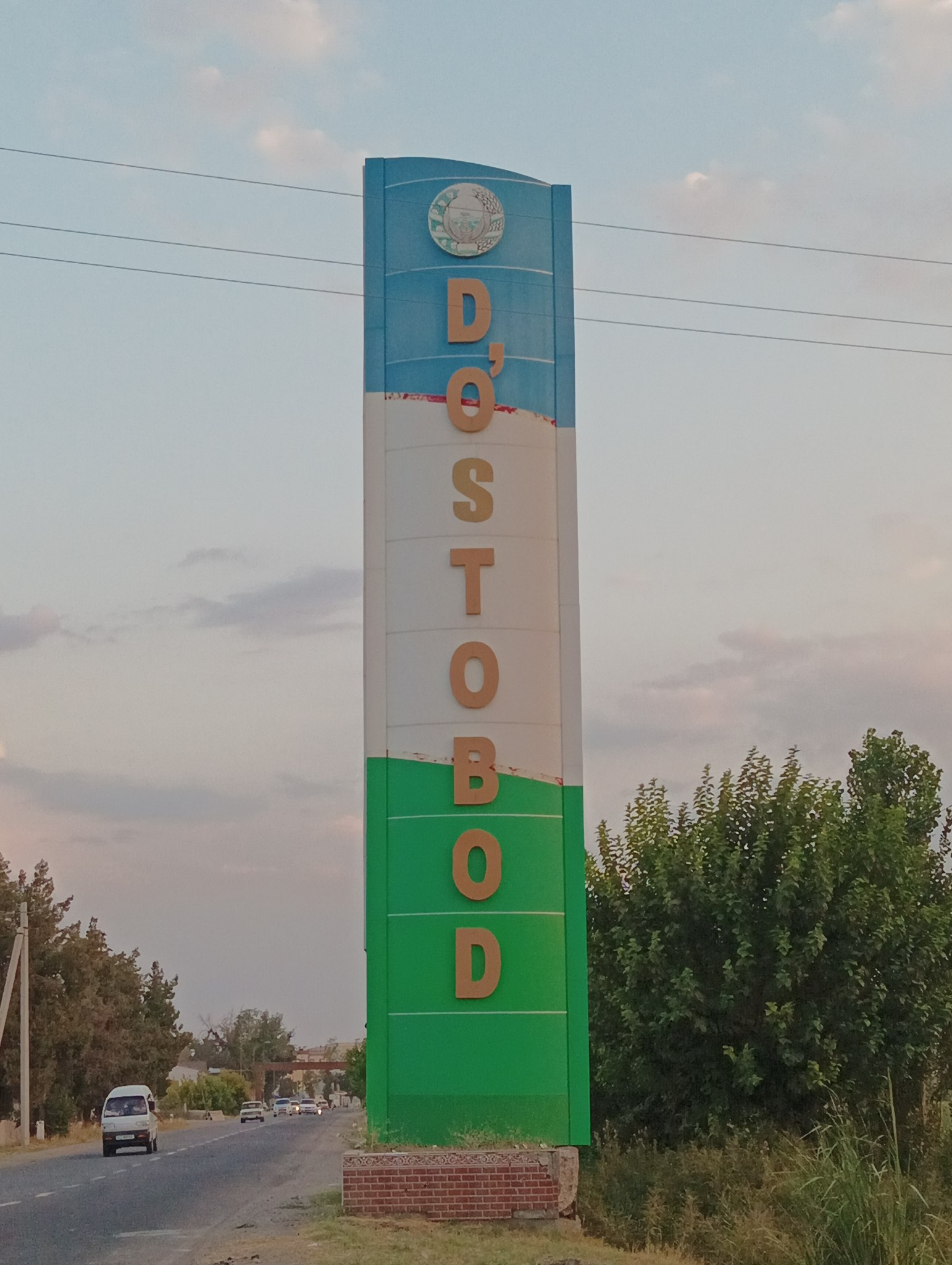

- Location in Uzbekistan
- Coordinates: 40°51′23″N 68°55′41″E
- Country: Uzbekistan
- Region: Tashkent Region
- District: Quyichirchiq District
- Town status: 1895

Government

Population (2025)
  - Total: 26,800
- Time zone: UTC+5 (UZT)

Doʻstobod (Uzbek: Дўстобод/Doʻstobod), known as Soldatsky until 1991, is a city in Tashkent Region, Uzbekistan. It is the capital of Quyichirchiq District. Its population was 13,600 in 2000, and 16,200 in 2016.

== Etymology ==
The name Doʻstobod (Uzbek: Дўстобод) is of Iranian origin and consists of two elements: дўст and -обод/-абад. Дўст (Persian: دوست) is a word meaning "friend," "close person," or "comrade," while -обод (Persian: -آباد) is a common toponymic affix in Iranian-speaking regions, meaning "inhabited place," "populated area," or "flourishing settlement." Thus, the toponym Doʻstobod can be interpreted as "settlement of friends" or "city of friendship." Many places in Central Asia also feature names with the suffix -абад, such as Ashgabat, Islamabad, or Türkmenabat.

== History ==
The Russian colonization of the Tashkent district, which was part of the Syr Darya region in the Turkestan region, began in the early 1980s. The second wave of Russian settlers arrived at the lower reaches of the Syr Darya River, Akhangaran. During this period, in 1894, the settlement of Soldatsky was founded. The residents were primarily Russian Cossacks, Ukrainians, merchants, and simple peasants. From 1870 to 1895, 10,000 rubles were issued as gratuitous assistance to 615 families and 25,000 rubles as loans to 897 families. The tsarist autocracy's resettlement policy was implemented not through the development of vast tracts of empty land, but by displacing local residents from established lands. From the time of the conquest of Central Asia until 1906, 159,561 dessiatines (1,742.43 sq. km) were seized for Cossack and peasant colonization in the Syr Darya region. In 1894, the resettlement of the village of Soldatsky to the Tashkent district was completed.

The village's area in 1894 was 2,728 dessiatines (29.79 sq. km.).

In 1904, the Soldatsky parish school was opened, and later the name was changed to "Herzen School."

An Orthodox church was built here, consecrated on the eve of the 1917 Revolution, and existed until 1936, after which it was destroyed. In 1942, it was consecrated as a prayer house.

Until 1991, the town was called Soldatsky, and until 1996, Askarlik. It is located 50 km from the Razyezd 55 railway station (on the Khavast-Tashkent line).

During the Soviet period, such large enterprises as the Textile and Haberdashery Factory, the Lubyanoy Plant, the Experimental Mechanical Plant, and SSK-3 were commissioned.

In early 1992, a courtyard of the Holy Trinity-St. Nicholas Monastery was established here, transformed in 1998 into the Holy Protection Convent.

On January 21, 1994, a hospital was opened in southern Tashkent.

== Administrative division ==
Dustabad is divided into four mahallas.

• Navqiron

• Mirabad

• Navqiron

• Mashrab

== Population ==
Population change
Years	2010	2011	2012	2013	2014	2015	2016	2017	2018	2019	2020	2021	2022	2023	2024	2025
population	▲20.6	▬20.6	▼24.4	▬24.4	▼24.3	▲24.5	▲24.7	▲24.9	▲25.1	▲25.3	▲25.7	▲25.9	▲26.0	▲26.2	▲26.5	▲26.8
