= Bekabad District =

Bekabad
- District
- Bekobod tumani
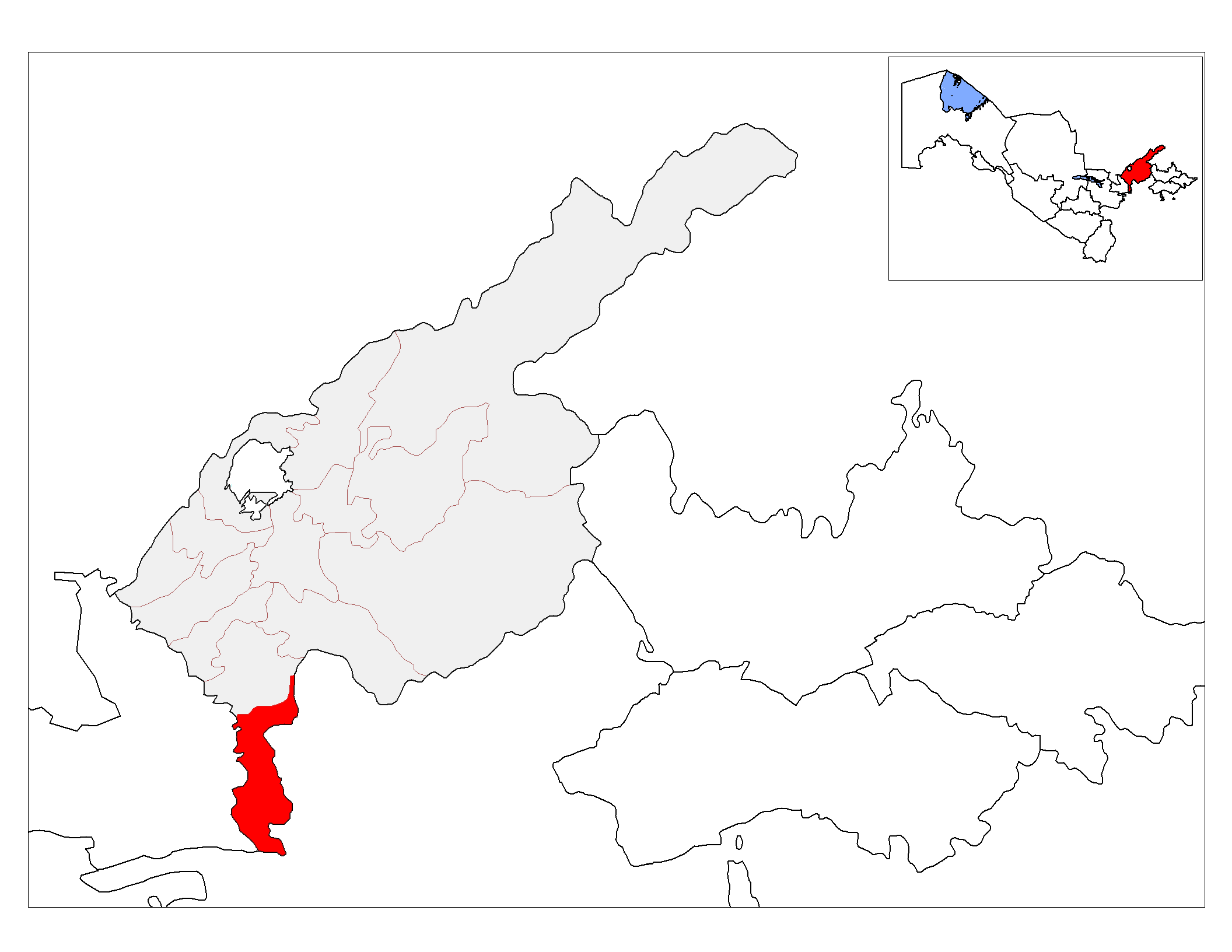
- Country: Uzbekistan
- Region: Tashkent Region
- Capital: Zafar
- Established: 1926

Area
  - Total: 760 km^{2} (290 sq mi)

Population (2021)
  - Total: 159,500
  - Density: 210/km^{2} (540/sq mi)
- Time zone: UTC+5 (UZT)

Bekabad is a district of Tashkent Region in Uzbekistan. The capital lies at the town Zafar. It has an area of 760 km^{2} (290 sq mi) and it had 159,500 inhabitants in 2021.

== Settlements ==
The district consists of 5 urban-type settlements (Zafar, Bobur, Koʻrkam, Xos, Gulzor) and 12 rural communities (Moʻyinqum, Bahoriston, Bekobod, Dalvarzin, Guliston, Madaniyat, Jumabozor, Qiyot, Mehnatobod, Yangiqoʻrgʻon, Chanoq, Yangi hayot).

== Population ==
The population is mainly ethnic Uzbeks, as well as Tatars, Tajiks and representatives of other nationalities. The population density is 210 people per km^{2}. The urban population is 29 thousand people, the rural population is 30.5 thousand people (2021).
