= Buvayda District =

Buvayda
- District
- Buvayda tumani
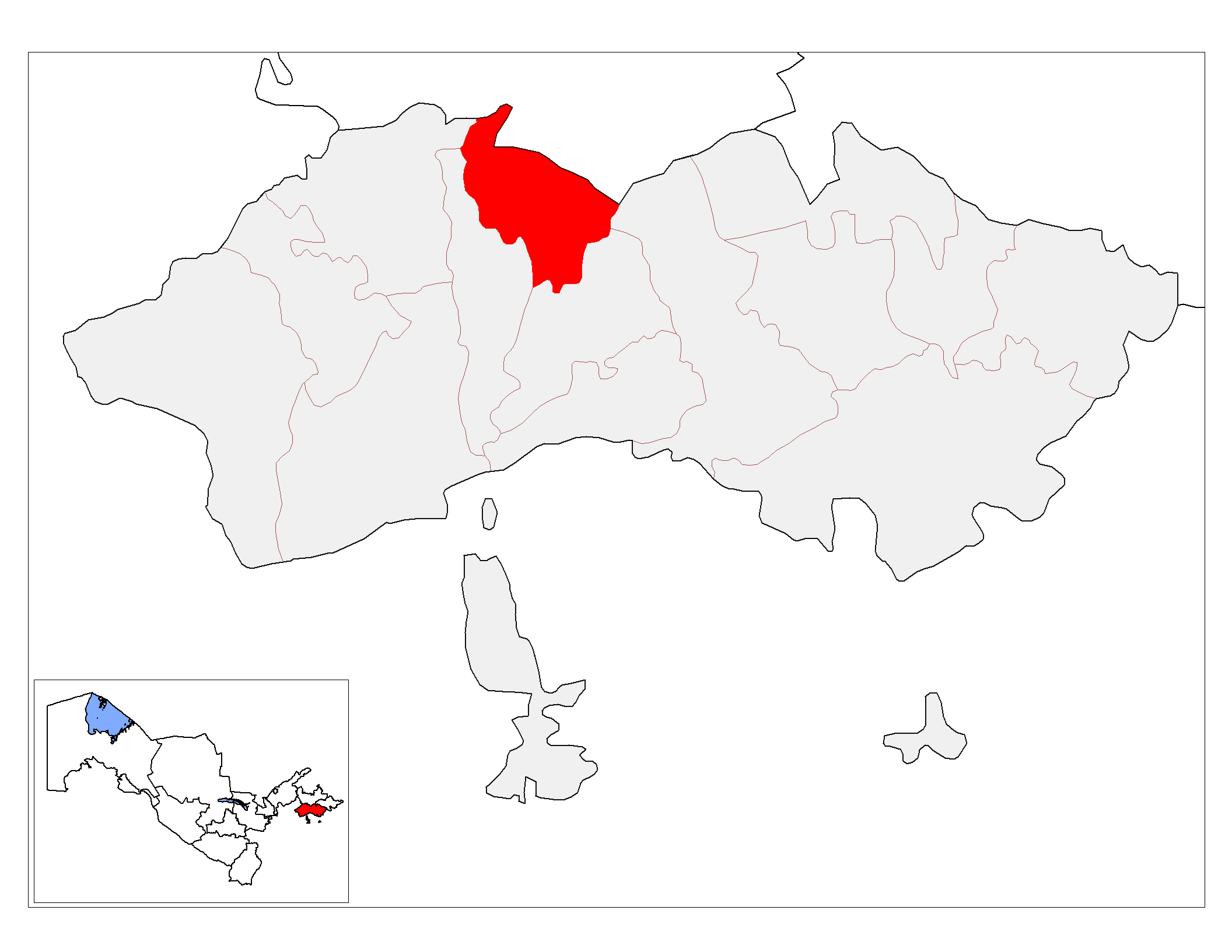
- Coordinates: 40°33′14″N 71°8′48″E
- Country: Uzbekistan
- Region: Fergana Region
- Capital: Ibrat
- Established: 1926

Area
  - Total: 280 km^{2} (110 sq mi)

Population (2022)
  - Total: 236,200
  - Density: 840/km^{2} (2,200/sq mi)
- Time zone: UTC+5 (UZT)

Buvayda is a district of Fergana Region in Uzbekistan. The capital lies at the town Ibrat. It has an area of 280 km^{2} (110 sq mi) and it had 236,200 inhabitants in 2022. The district consists of 10 urban-type settlements (Ibrat, Yuqori Bachqir, Quyi Bachqir, Chinobod, Buvayda, Zarbuloq, Qum, Yuqori Nayman, Oqqoʻrgʻon, Quyi Urganji) and 11 rural communities.
