= Zafar, Uzbekistan =

Zafar
- Urban-type settlement
- Location in Uzbekistan
- Coordinates: 40°22′35″N 69°15′05″E
- Country: Uzbekistan
- Region: Tashkent Region
- District: Bekabad District
- Urban-type settlement: 1972

Population (2000)
  - Total: 7,700
- Time zone: UTC+5 (UZT)

Zafar (Uzbek: Zafar/Зафар, Russian: Зафар) is an urban-type settlement in Tashkent Region, Uzbekistan. It is the administrative center of Bekabad District. The town population in 1989 was 7167 people.
