= Yangihayot =

- District of Tashkent
- Location within Uzbekistan
- Coordinates: 41.19°N 69.22°E
- Country: Uzbekistan
- Municipality: Tashkent
- Established: 2020

Area
  - Total: 44.20 km^{2} (17.07 sq mi)

Population (2021)
  - Total: 132,800
  - Density: 3,005/km^{2} (7,782/sq mi)

Yangihayot ("New Life" in Uzbek) is one of 12 city districts (tuman) of Tashkent, the capital of Uzbekistan. It was created in 2020 from parts of the city districts Sergeli and Bektemir, and parts of the districts Zangiota, Quyichirchiq, Yangiyoʻl and Oʻrtachirchiq of Tashkent Region. Its area is 44.20 km^{2} (17.07 sq mi), and its population is 132,800 (2021).
