= Ibrat =

- Urban-type settlement
- Location in Uzbekistan
- Coordinates: 40°33′14″N 71°8′48″E
- Country: Uzbekistan
- Region: Fergana Region
- District: Buvayda District

Population (2016)
  - Total: 8,500
- Time zone: UTC+5 (UZT)

Ibrat (Uzbek: Ibrat/Ибрат, Russian: Ибрат, formerly Yangiqoʻrgʻon) is an urban-type settlement in Fergana Region, Uzbekistan. It is the administrative center of Buvayda District. Its population was 7,502 people in 1989, and 8,500 in 2016.
