= Sergeli =

Coordinates: 41.2102°N 69.2318°E

- District of Tashkent
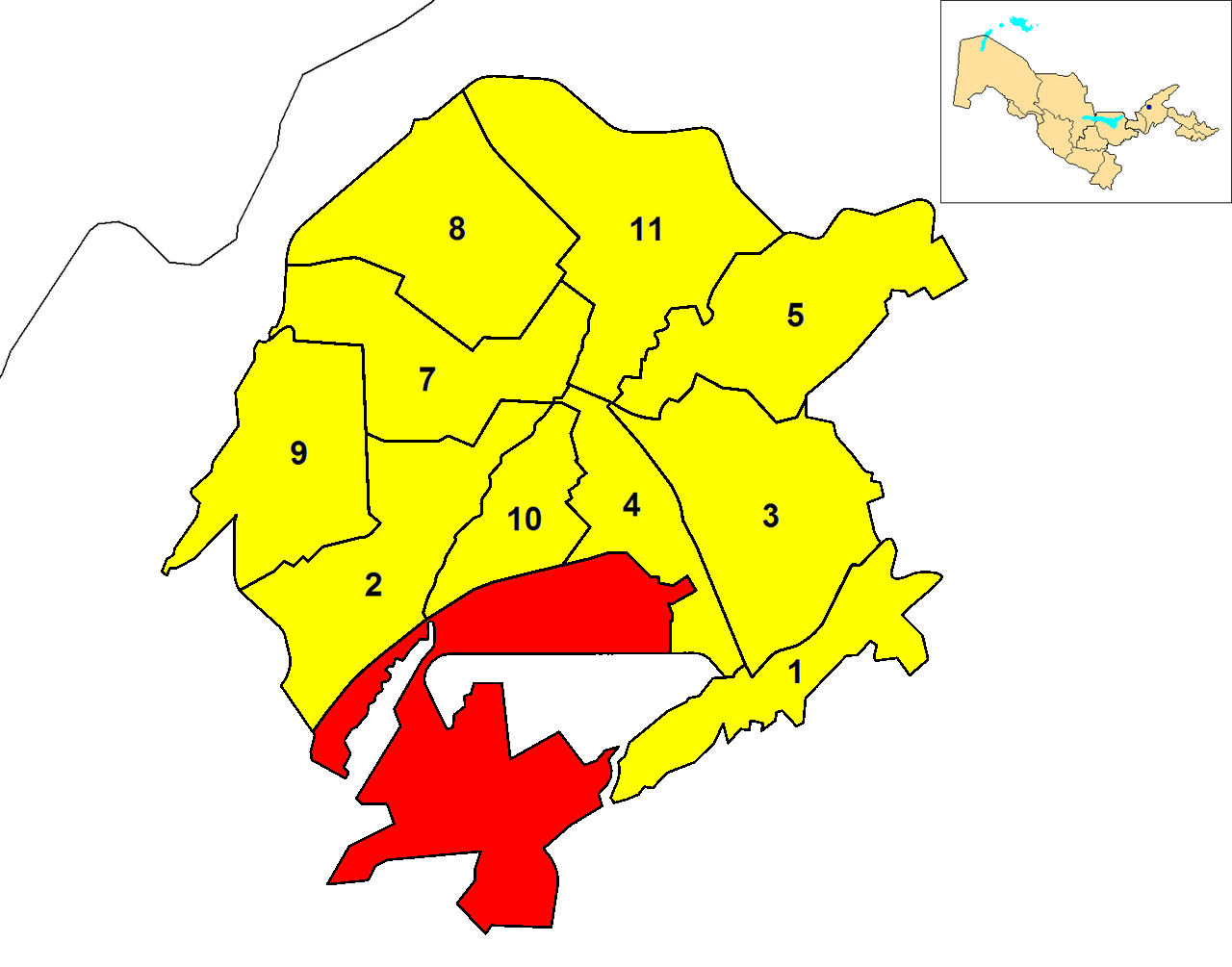
- Country: Uzbekistan
- Municipality: Tashkent
- Established: 1981

Area
  - Total: 37.36 km^{2} (14.42 sq mi)

Population (2021)
  - Total: 105,700
  - Density: 2,829/km^{2} (7,328/sq mi)

Sergeli (Uzbek: Sirgʻali tumani, Russian: Сергелийский район, romanized: Sergeliysky rayon) is one of 12 districts (tuman) of Tashkent, the capital of Uzbekistan.

== Overview ==
This suburban district, established in 1981, is the greatest one per area and hosts Tashkent International Airport. In 2020 it lost 18.64 km^{2} to the new district Yangihayot.

Sergeli is the southernmost district of Tashkent and borders with Chilanzar, Yakkasaray, Mirobod and Bektemir. It borders also with Tashkent Region.
