= Bektemir =

- District
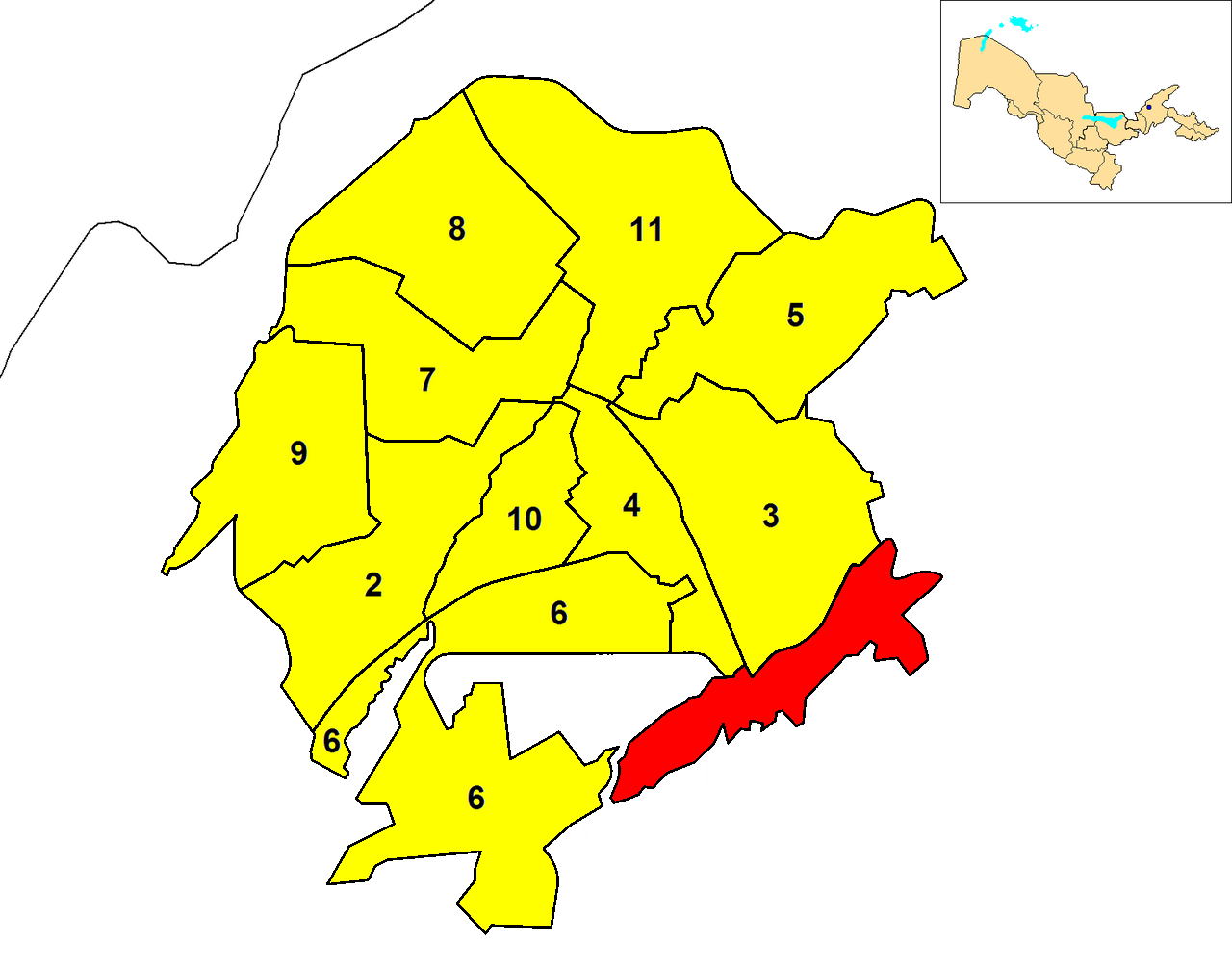
- Country: Uzbekistan
- Municipality: Tashkent
- Established: 1990

Area
  - Total: 17.83 km^{2} (6.88 sq mi)

Population (2021)
  - Total: 31,400
  - Density: 1,760/km^{2} (4,560/sq mi)

Bektemir is one of 12 districts (tuman) of Tashkent, the capital of Uzbekistan.

== Overview ==
The district was established in 1990 and lies in the south-eastern suburban area of Tashkent. It is the least-populated tuman of the city. In 2020 it lost 2.67 km^{2} to the new district Yangihayot.

It borders with the districts of Sergeli, Mirobod and Hamza. It borders also with Tashkent Region.
