= Mirobod =

Coordinates: 41.2760°N 69.2936°E

- District of Tashkent
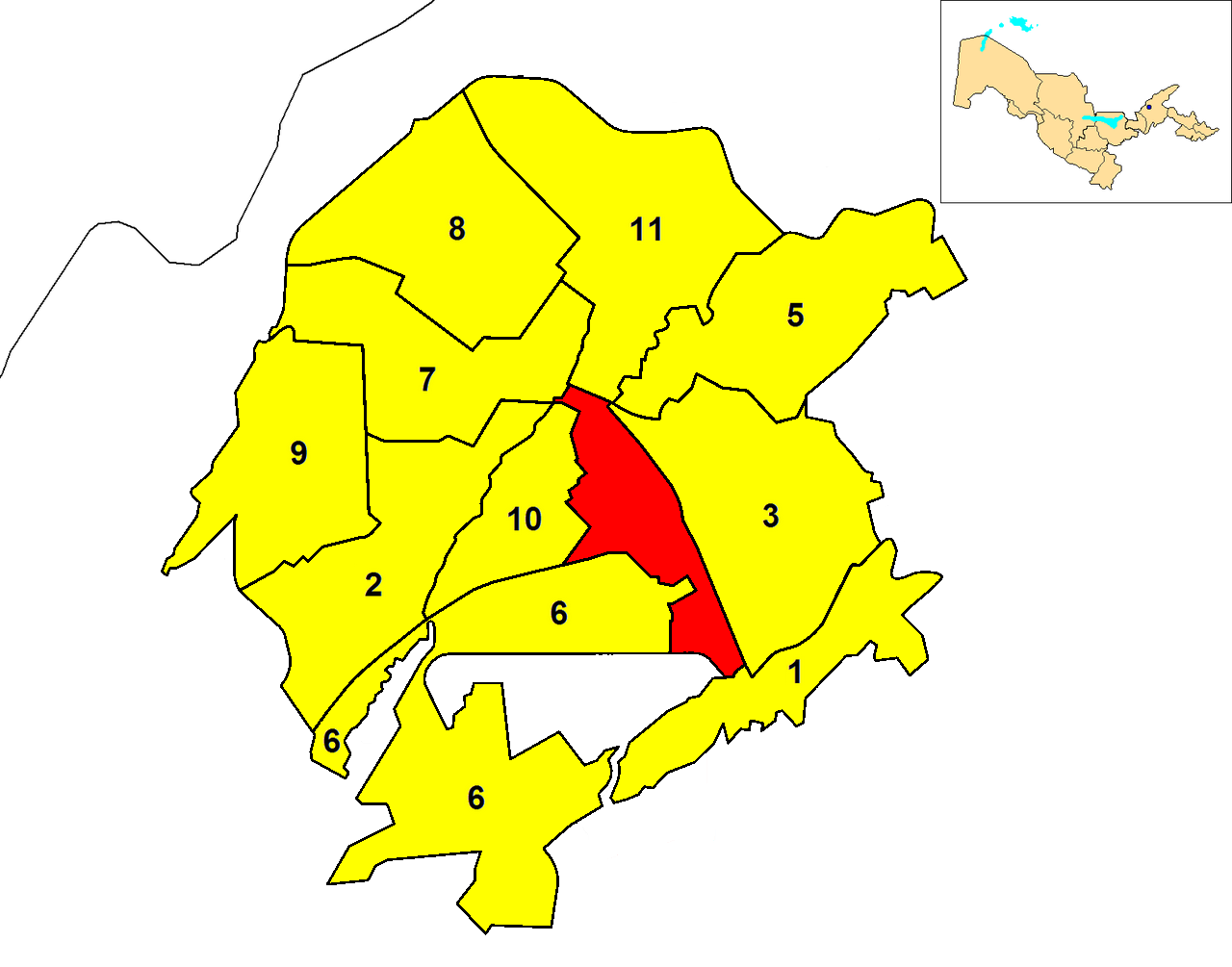
- Country: Uzbekistan
- Municipality: Tashkent
- Established: 1981

Area
  - Total: 17.1 km^{2} (6.6 sq mi)

Population (2021)
  - Total: 142,800
  - Density: 8,350/km^{2} (21,600/sq mi)

Mirobod (Uzbek: Mirobod tumani, Russian: Мирабадский район, romanized: Mirabadsky rayon) is one of 12 districts (tuman) of Tashkent, the capital of Uzbekistan.

== Overview ==
It is one of the central districts of the city and was established in 1981 with the name of Lenin, referring to the famous Russian communist leader Vladimir Lenin.

Mirobod borders with the districts of Sergeli, Yakkasaray, Yunusabad, Hamza and Bektemir.

== Project ==
=== Famous buildings ===
2018 Do'stlar
