= Quyichirchiq District =

Coordinates: 40.8564°N 68.9281°E

Quyichirchiq
- District
- Quyichirchiq tumani
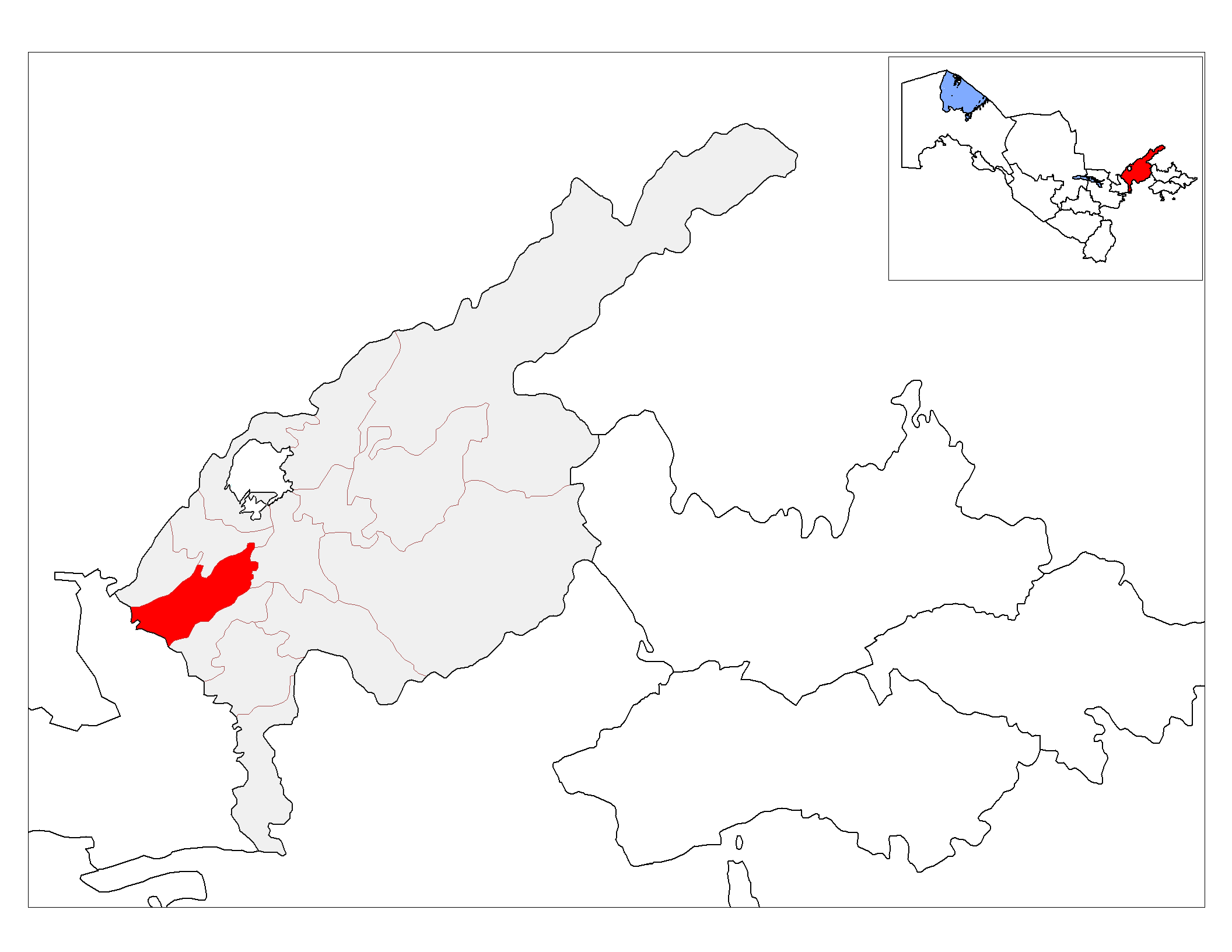
- Country: Uzbekistan
- Region: Tashkent Region
- Capital: Doʻstobod
- Established: 1926

Area
  - Total: 560 km^{2} (220 sq mi)

Population (2021)
  - Total: 110,100
  - Density: 200/km^{2} (510/sq mi)
- Time zone: UTC+5 (UZT)

Quyichirchiq or Quy Chirchiq (Low Chirchiq) is a district of Tashkent Region in Uzbekistan. The capital lies at the city Doʻstobod. It has an area of 560 km^{2} (220 sq mi) and it had 110,100 inhabitants in 2021. The district consists of one city (Doʻstobod), 2 urban-type settlements (Qoʻrgʻoncha, Paxtazor) and 9 rural communities (Gul, Ketmontepa, Maydontol, Qoʻrgʻoncha, Maʼnaviyat, Maʼrifat, Oʻzbekiston, Toshovul, Toshloq).
