= Do'stlar =

Planned building complex in Uzbekistan

General information
- Status: Topped-out
- Type: Apartments, public spaces, restaurants and luxury shopping gallery.
- Location: Tashkent, Uzbekistan
- Construction started: 2015
- Completed: 2017
- Opening: 2018

Technical details
- Floor area: 325,227 m^{2} (3,500,710 sq ft)
- Lifts/elevators: 17

Design and construction
- Architect: ООО MB Studio
- Structural engineer: Murad Buildings
- Main contractor: Subcontractеr

The Do'stlar (Russian: Дўслар) is a multifunctional residential complex in the Mirobod is a mixed-use building complex located in the center of Tashkent, the capital of Uzbekistan. Do’stlar is one of the most unusual buildings and one of the most beautiful buildings in Uzbekistan and Central Asia. On 2015, after the project stage, Uzbekistan and Kazakhstan signed an agreement between the two countries on the construction of Do'stlar.

Friends consists of a large building with a total area of more than 600,000 m^{2}.

"Do’stlar" Housing Center was opened in 2018. It has two levels of shops and restaurants in the common area

== History ==
After the announcement of the start of construction of the "Friends" project in Tashkent, Murad Buildings, developer of lot 4, has been negotiating for two years with companies from Japan, Singapore, the United States and other countries.

More than 500 specialists worked on the development of the construction project. The urban design within the city was developed by Uzbek designers.

Zetas Zemin Teknolojisi AS (Kazakhstan), specialized in the study of soil for the foundations of multi-storey buildings, was engaged in the study of soil composition.

The management of the construction process, costs and deadlines, quality control, ecology, safety and labor protection was carried out by the French company Bureau Veritas. The appearance and design of the complex was entrusted to the architectural office MB STUDIO from Uzbekistan.

At the first presentation of the project at the Hyatt Regency Tashkent hotel on March 5, 2015, the head of the development company noted the following:

On November 13, 2014, a press conference was held, where representatives of the development companies presented the architectural plan of the object, and the official name of the skyscraper was announced. On December 1, 2014, the sale of premises in the skyscraper began. In 2018, the opening of the "Friends" building was solemnly announced.

== Building specifications and codes ==
When designing the building, several risks were taken into account:

- Seismic resistance tests carried out at Tashkent University showed that the designed building can withstand an earthquake of up to 9 points.
- The German company RWDI tested the effect of wind on the building's façade. A special CFD analysis was also carried out, the analysis showed the comfort of pedestrians near the building.
- The building's escape routes are protected from smoke thanks to ventilation systems. Fires in the building are controlled by a built-in intelligent system.
- To test the bearing capacity of the soil, 28 test pits with a depth of up to 27 meters were built and filled with a special concrete mixture. After 28 days, when the concrete reached 90% of its strength, tests were performed to determine its actual ability to interact with the pile. Each column was subjected to a pressure of 1400 tons. For the first time in Uzbekistan, the Barrett foundation is used for the construction of a building. For the first time in Uzbekistan, m800 grade concrete is used to build a skyscraper. In particular, to provide the future complex with special brand concrete, a concrete plant was built on the outskirts of Tashkent, in which 4 million dollars were invested.

== Awards ==
- The most beautiful building of 2018
- The most beautiful building of Uzbekistan in 2018

== Particular qualities ==
Do’stlar has 1,061 luxury apartments with 1 to 5 bedrooms and 37 to 511 m2. The communal, technical and domestic issues of the complex are handled by a private management company.
