= Shayxontoxur =

Coordinates: 41.3270°N 69.2110°E

- District of Tashkent
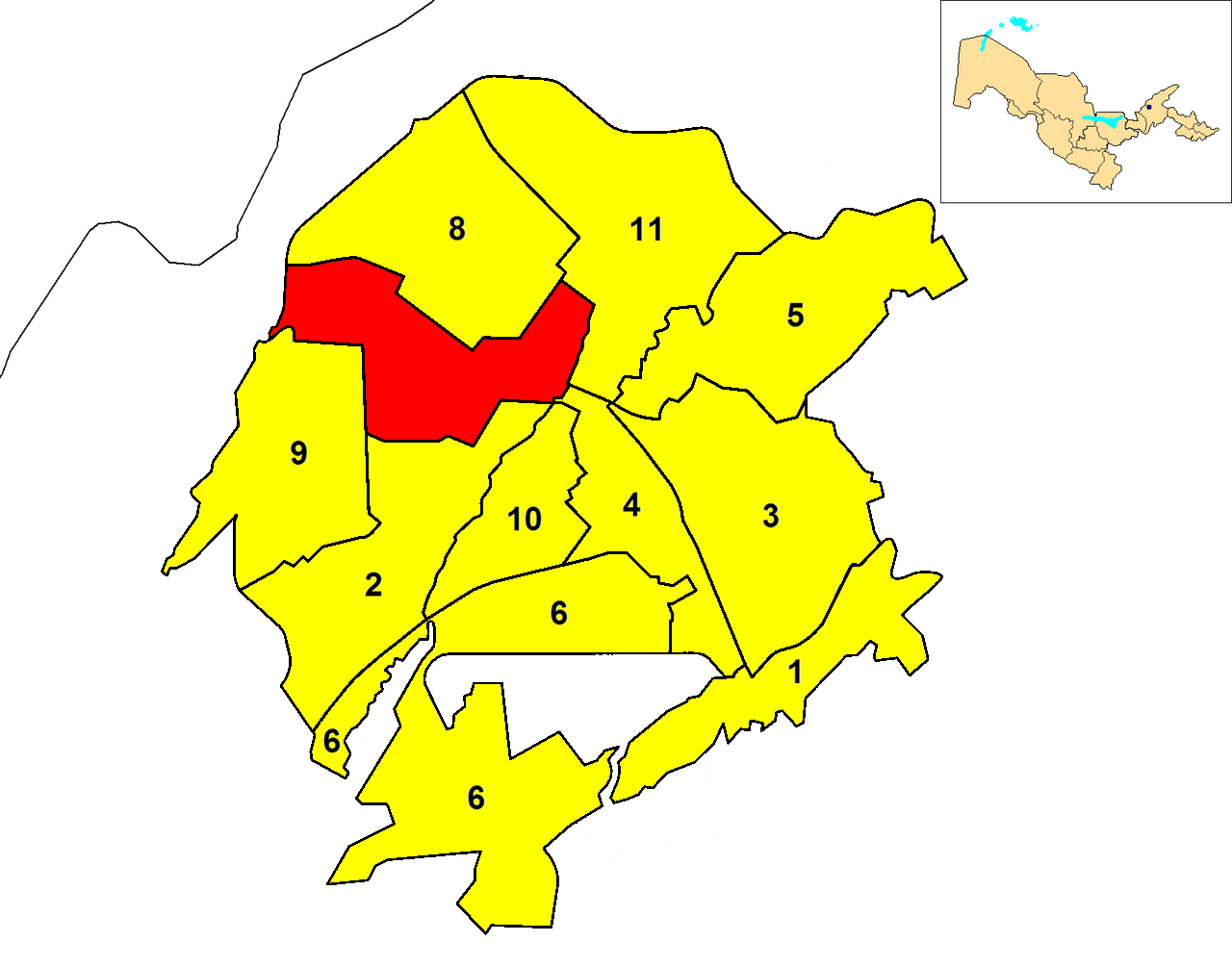
- Country: Uzbekistan
- Municipality: Tashkent
- Established: 1981

Area
  - Total: 29.7 km^{2} (11.5 sq mi)

Population (2021)
  - Total: 348,300
  - Density: 11,700/km^{2} (30,400/sq mi)

Shayxontoxur (Uzbek: Shayxontoxur tumani, Russian: Шайхантахурский район, romanized: Shaykhantakhursky rayon) is one of 12 districts (tuman) of Tashkent, the capital of Uzbekistan.

== Overview ==
It is a north-western district, established in 1981 with the name of Oktober, referring to the October Revolution, part of Russian Revolution of 1917. It is the most densely populated tuman.

Shayxontoxur borders with the districts of Uchtepa, Chilanzar, Yakkasaray, Yunusabad and Olmazar. It borders also with Tashkent Region and is close to the Uzbek frontier with South Kazakhstan Region, in Kazakhstan.

== Project ==
=== Famous buildings ===
No.	Name	Start of construction	End of construction	Buildings	Area (m^{2})	Notes
1	Gardens Residence	2018	2020	9	89 518	
2	Central Plaza	2018	2021	6	45 886	The first hotel in Uzbekistan under the Park Inn by Radisson brand
3	Hyper Partners Center	2019	2021	4	76 744	The largest shopping center in Uzbekistan
4	Nest One	2019	2021	2	14 779	Tallest residential building in Uzbekistan
5	Congress Hall, Hilton Hotel	2018	2019	2	88 138	The first hotel in Uzbekistan under the brand Hilton
6	Finance center	2019	2021	5	44 235	The largest financial center in Uzbekistan
7	Boulevard Residence	2018	2020	9	116 761	
8	Tashkent City Park	2019	2019	—	186 804	The largest recreational park area in Uzbekistan. The largest fountain in Uzbekistan.
9	U Tower	2019	2023	-	187,160	Offices, apartments, public spaces, restaurants and luxury shopping gallery.
