= Chilanzar =

Chilanzar Chilonzor
- District of Tashkent
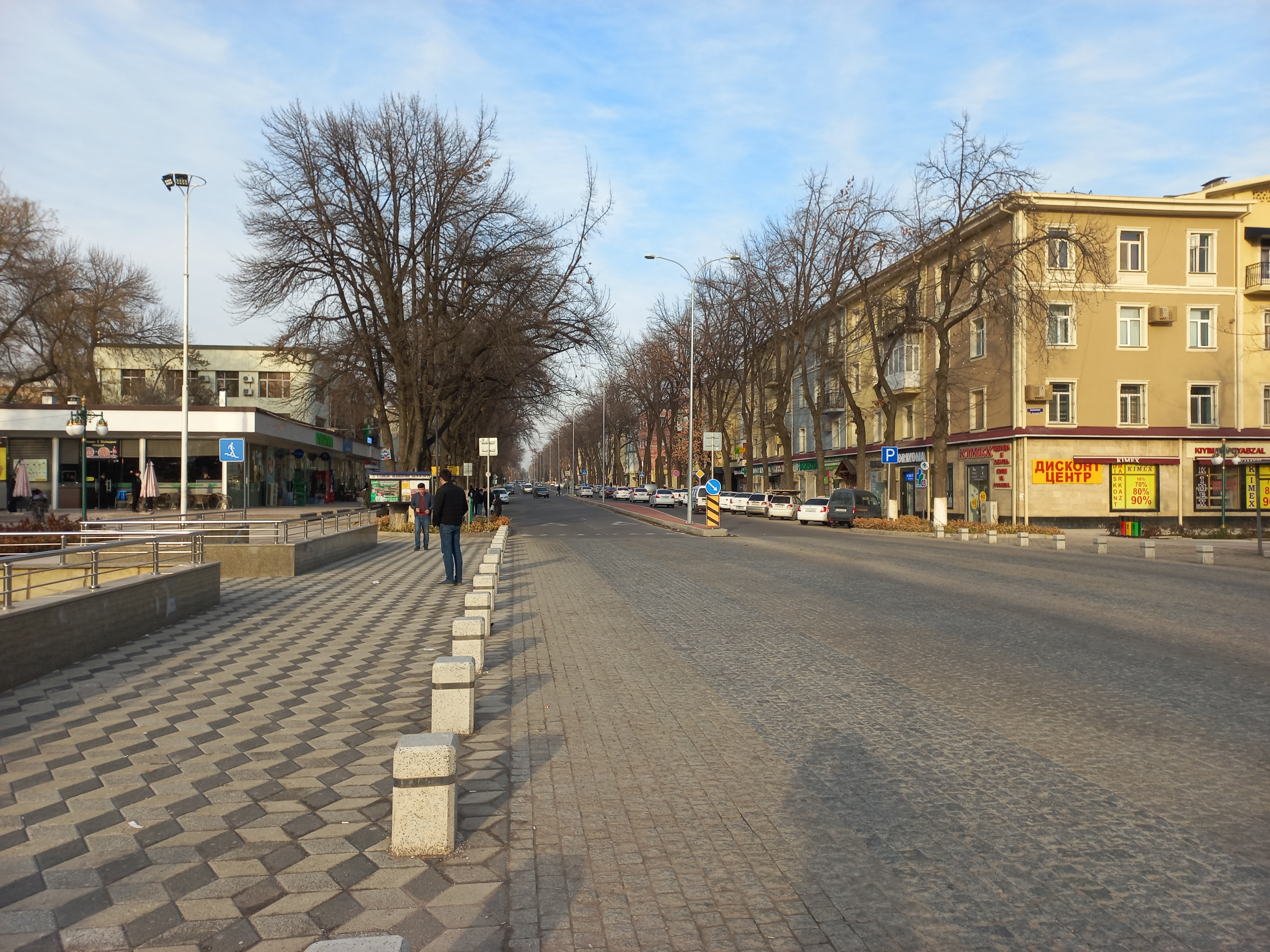

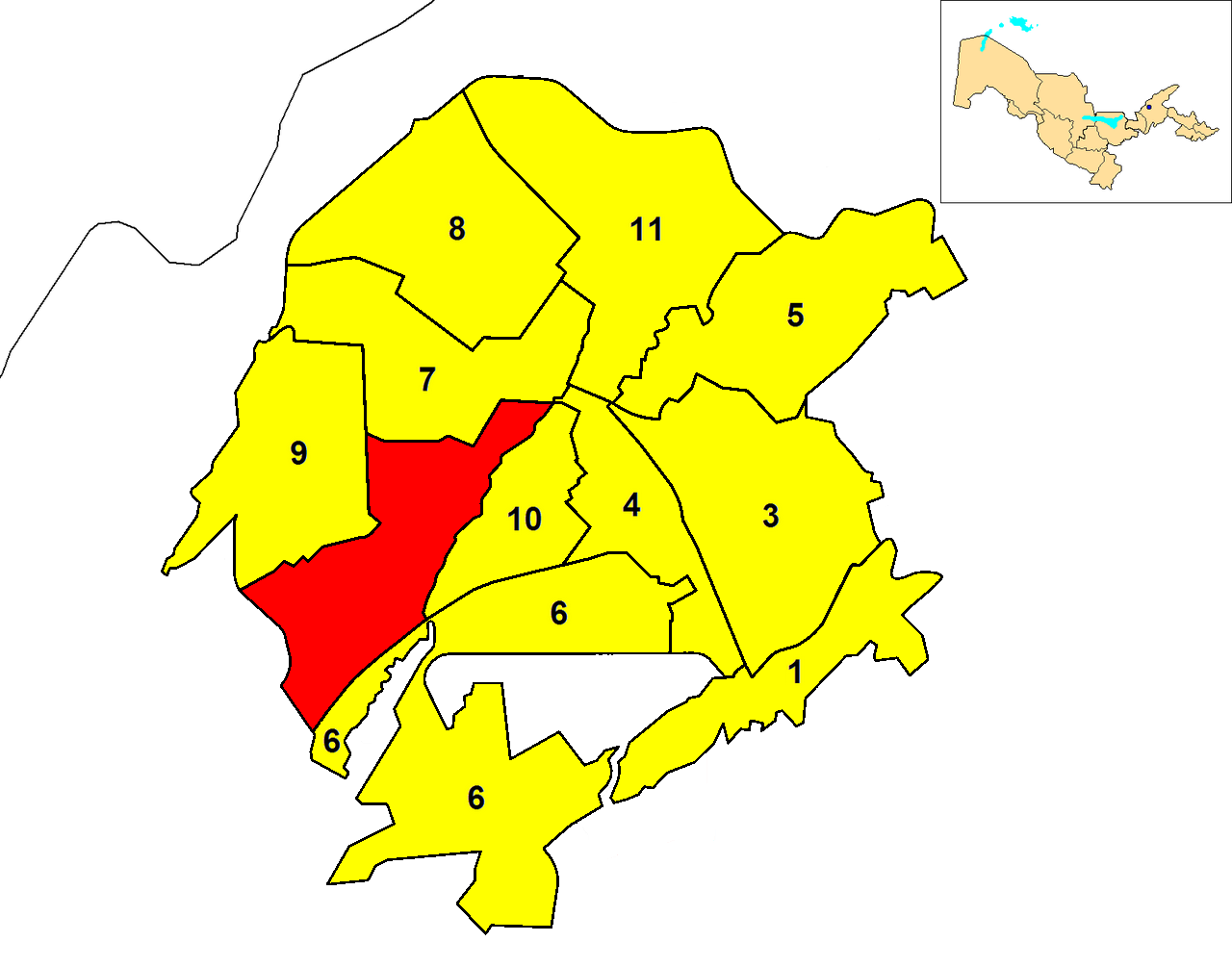
- Coordinates: 41°16′20″N 69°12′06″E
- Country: Uzbekistan
- Municipality: Tashkent
- Established: 1981

Government
  - Type: District Administration
  - Hokim (Mayor): Saidqahhor Xolxo'jayev

Area
  - Total: 29.94 km^{2} (11.56 sq mi)

Population (2021)
  - Total: 260,700
  - Density: 8,707/km^{2} (22,550/sq mi)

Chilanzar (Uzbek: Chilonzor tumani, Russian: Чиланзарский район, romanized: Chilanzarsky rayon) is one of 12 districts (tuman) of Tashkent, the capital of Uzbekistan.

== Overview ==
It was founded in the rural suburb of Tashkent in 1956, named after the homonymous residential quarter and was established, as district, in 1981.

Chilanzar borders with the districts of Uchtepa, Shayxontoxur, Yunusabad, Yakkasaray and Sergeli. It borders also with Tashkent Province.
