= Yakkasaray =

Coordinates: 41.2760°N 69.2470°E

Yakkasaray Yakkasaroy
- District of Tashkent
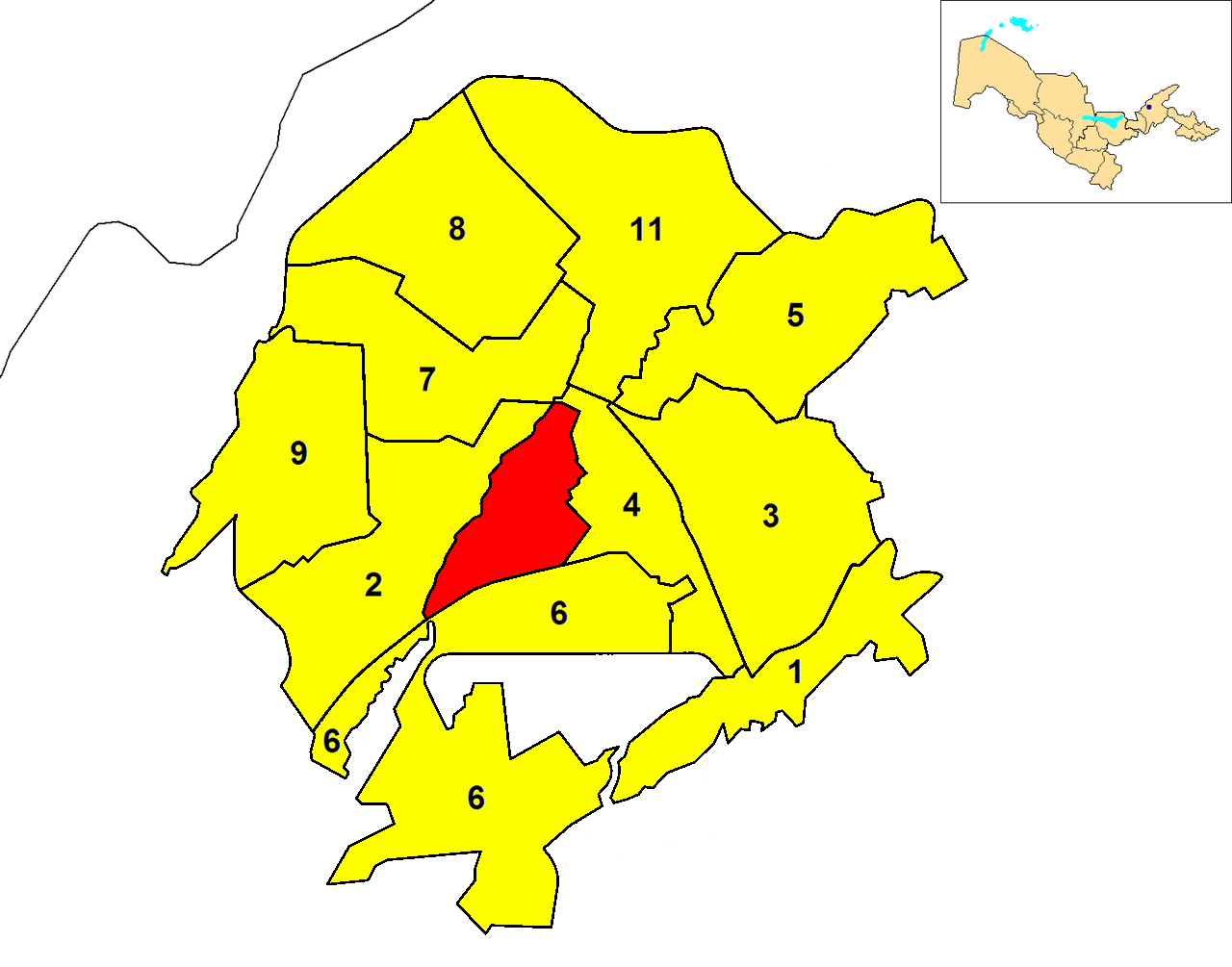
- Country: Uzbekistan
- Municipality: Tashkent
- Established: 1981

Area
  - Total: 14.6 km^{2} (5.6 sq mi)

Population (2021)
  - Total: 121,600
  - Density: 8,330/km^{2} (21,600/sq mi)

Yakkasaray (Uzbek: Yakkasaroy tumani, Russian: Яккасарайский район, romanized: Yakkasaraysky rayon) is one of 12 districts (tuman) of Tashkent, the capital of Uzbekistan.

== Overview ==
Yakkasaray is one of the most central districts of the city, and the smallest in area. It was established on August 26, 1936, with the name of Frunze, referring to the Kyrgyz Bolshevik leader Mikhail Frunze. On May 8, 1992, Frunze became Yakkasaray District.

Yakkasaray borders with the districts of Chilanzar, Shayxontoxur, Yunusabad, Mirobod and Sergeli.
