= Yunusabad =

Coordinates: 41.3580°N 69.2990°E

Yunusabad Yunusobod
- District of Tashkent
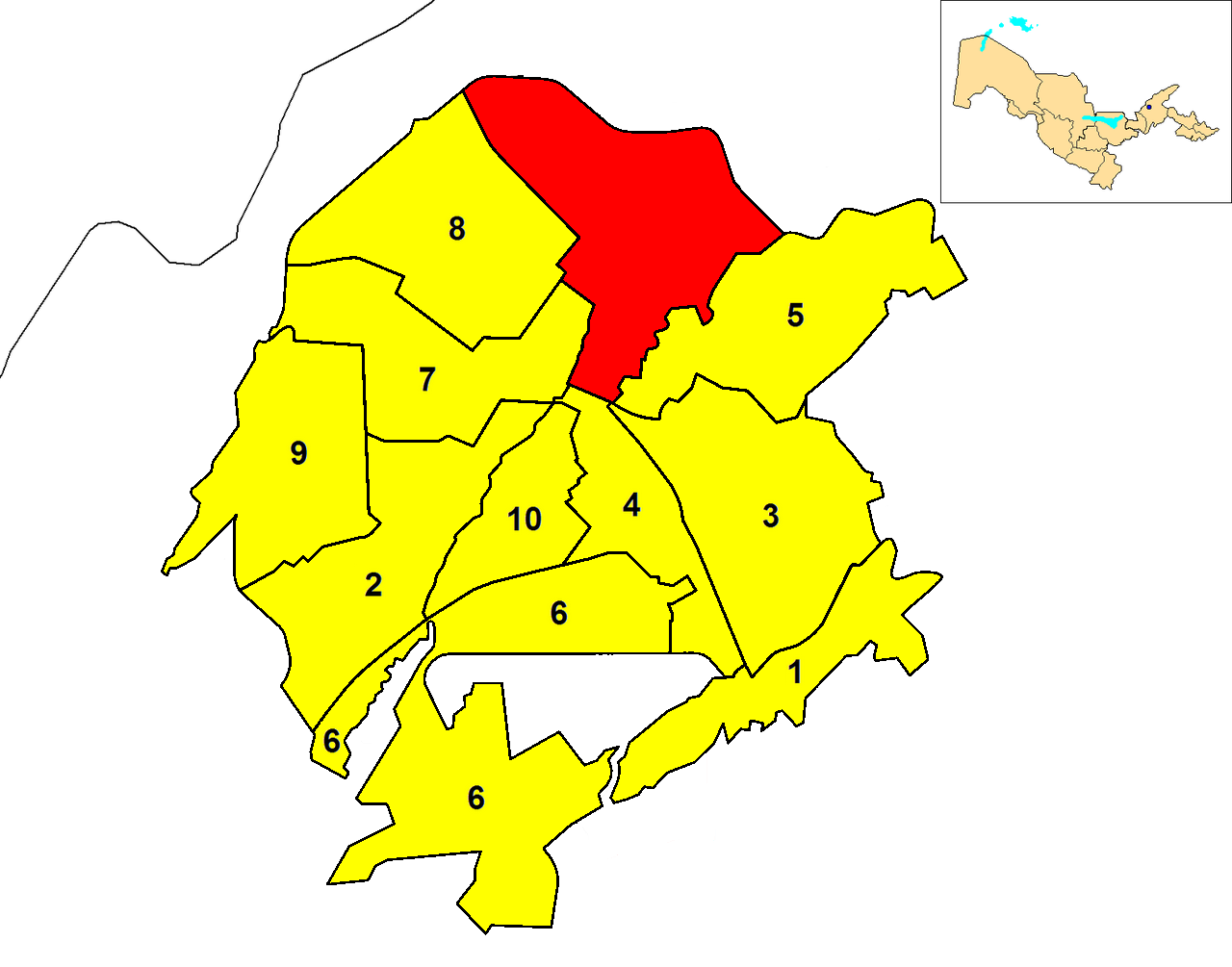
- Country: Uzbekistan
- Municipality: Tashkent
- Established: 1981

Area
  - Total: 40.6 km^{2} (15.7 sq mi)

Population (2021)
  - Total: 352,000
  - Density: 8,670/km^{2} (22,500/sq mi)

Yunusabad (Uzbek: Yunusobod tumani, Russian: Юнусабадский район, romanized: Yunusabadsky rayon) is one of 12 districts (tuman) of Tashkent, the capital of Uzbekistan.

== Overview ==
It is a site of many schools, bazaars, tennis courts and videogame centers and has one mall. The district was established in 1981 with the name of Kirov, referring to the Russian Bolshevik leader Sergey Kirov.

Yunusabad borders with the districts of Olmazar, Shaykhontohur, Chilanzar, Yakkasaray, Mirobod, Hamza and Mirzo Ulugbek. It borders also with Tashkent Province and is close to the Uzbek frontier with South Kazakhstan Province, in Kazakhstan.
