= Yashnobod =

Coordinates: 41.2862°N 69.3236°E

- District of Tashkent
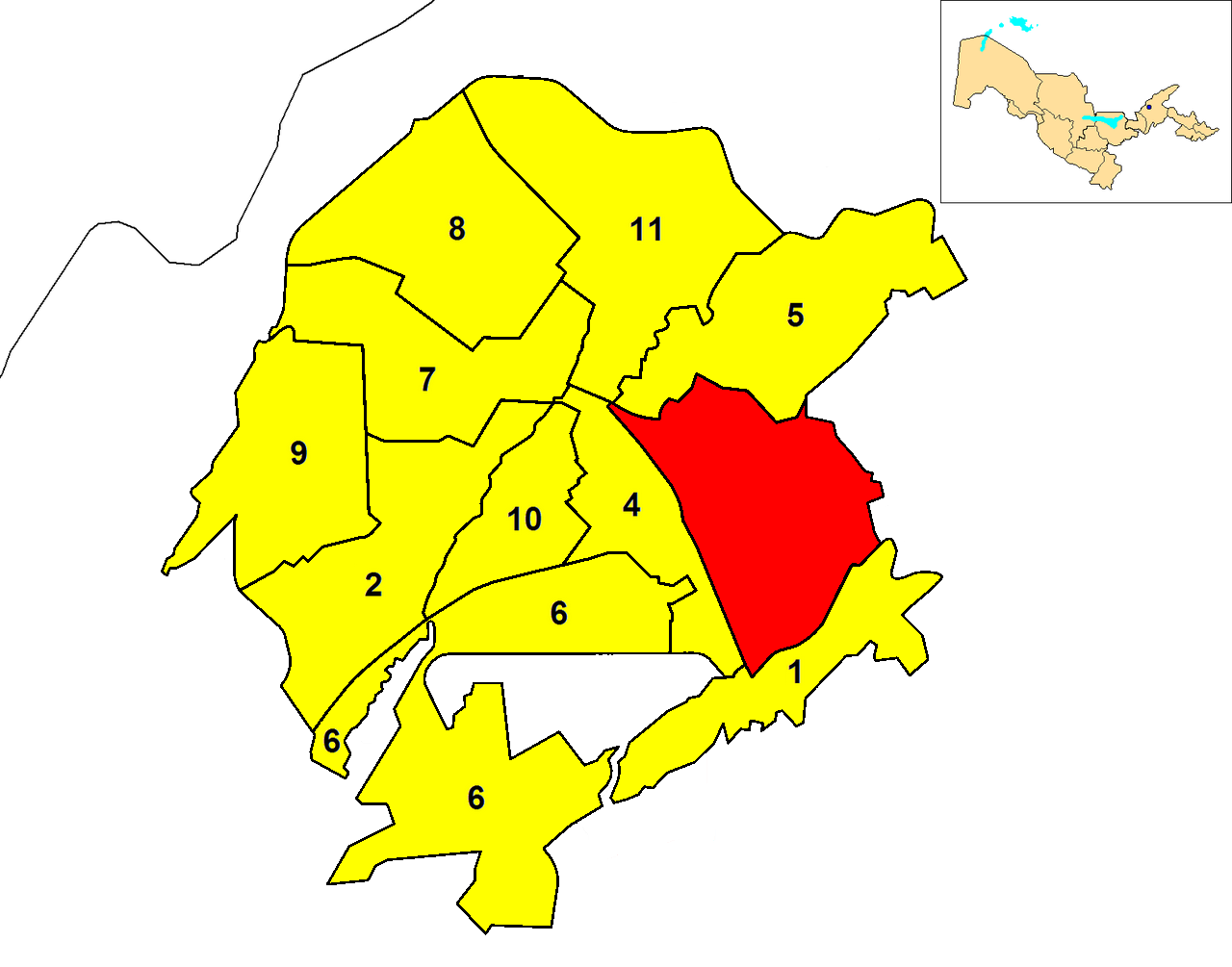
- Country: Uzbekistan
- Municipality: Tashkent
- Established: 1981

Area
  - Total: 33.7 km^{2} (13.0 sq mi)

Population (2021)
  - Total: 258,800
  - Density: 7,680/km^{2} (19,900/sq mi)

Yashnobod (Uzbek: Yashnobod tumani, Russian: Яшнободский район, romanized: Yashnobodsky rayon) is one of the twelve districts (tuman) of Tashkent, the capital of Uzbekistan.

== Overview ==
The district was established in 1968 with name Khamza district. It is an eastern district, and borders with the tuman of Mirzo Ulugbek, Yunusabad, Mirobod and Bektemir, as well as with Tashkent Province.

== Transportation ==
Out of 365 streets, the main ones are Istiklol Street, Taraqqiyot Street, Fargona Yuli Street, Tashkent Ring Road, Zharkurgan Street, Yashnobod and Akhangaran Highway.

The district has the Uzbekistan Line metro stations Mashinasozlar and Do‘stlik, which is the largest freight railway station in Tashkent (Product code 722400).

In the end of August 2014, the district was renamed to Yashnobod.

== Education ==
Yashnobod district hosts a number of institutions of higher education, including the first entrepreneurial university in Uzbekistan - TEAM University, and Tashkent State Stomatological Institute.
