= Uchtepa =

Coordinates: 41.2970°N 69.1810°E

- District of Tashkent
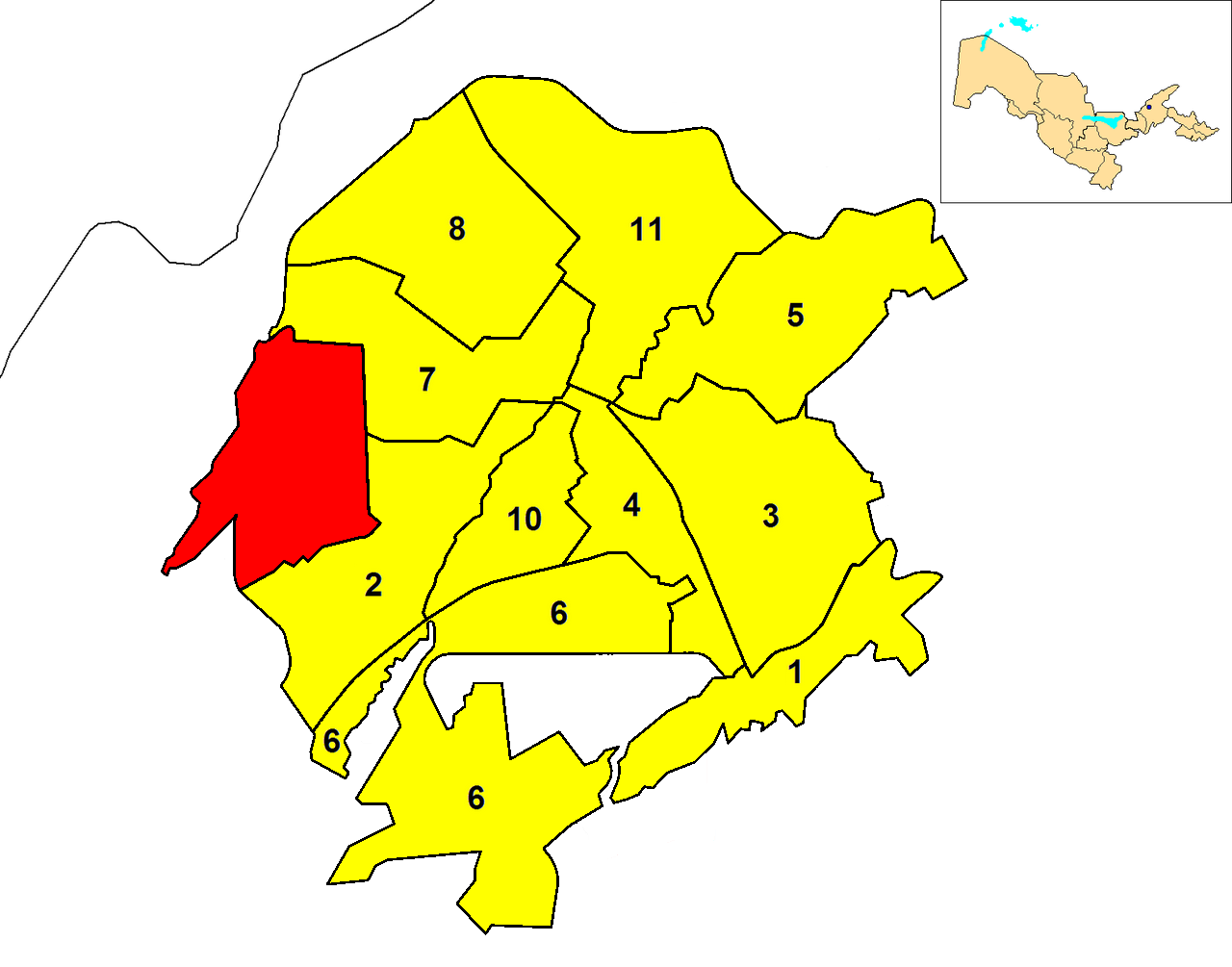
- Country: Uzbekistan
- Municipality: Tashkent
- Established: 1981

Area
  - Total: 24 km^{2} (9.3 sq mi)

Population (2021)
  - Total: 278,200
  - Density: 12,000/km^{2} (30,000/sq mi)

Uchtepa is one of 12 districts (tuman) of Tashkent, the capital of Uzbekistan.

== Overview ==
The district, located in the western suburb, was established in 1981 with the name of Akmal-Ikramov.

Uchtepa borders with the districts of Shaykhontohur and Chilanzar. It borders also with Tashkent Province and its northern area is close to the Uzbek frontier with South Kazakhstan Province, in Kazakhstan.
