= Olmazor =

Coordinates: 41.3640°N 69.2280°E

- District of Tashkent
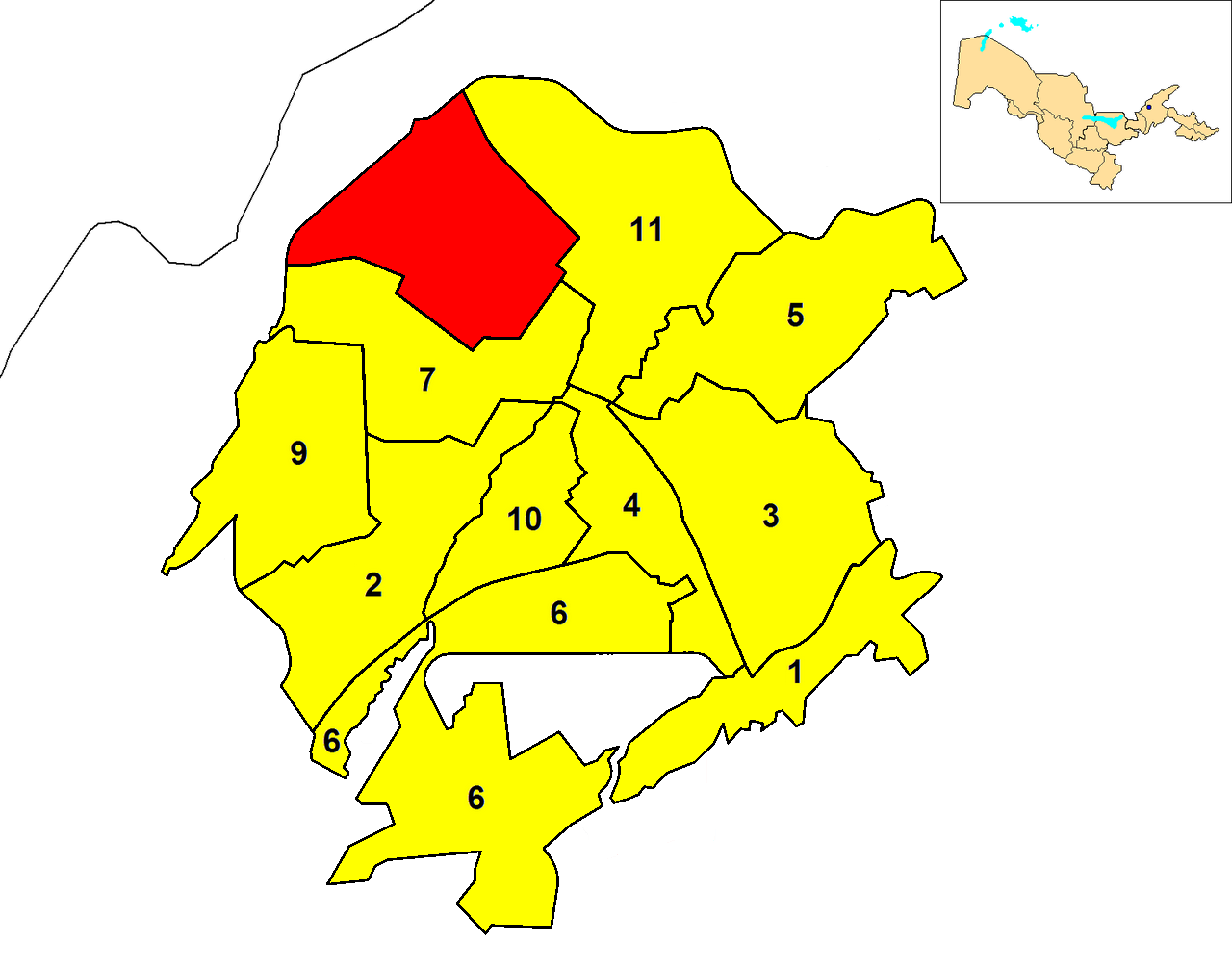
- Country: Uzbekistan
- Municipality: Tashkent
- Established: 1981

Area
  - Total: 34.5 km^{2} (13.3 sq mi)

Population (2021)
  - Total: 377,100
  - Density: 10,900/km^{2} (28,300/sq mi)

Olmazor (Uzbek: Olmazor tumani, Russian: Алмазарский район, romanized: Almazarsky rayon) is one of 12 districts (tuman) of Tashkent, the capital of Uzbekistan.

== Overview ==
It is a northern district and the most populated of Tashkent. It was established in 1981 as Sobir Rakhimov, referring to the Uzbek general and Hero of the Soviet Union during World War II.

Olmazor borders with the districts of Shayxontoxur and Yunusabad. It borders also with Tashkent Region and is close to the Uzbek frontier with South Kazakhstan Region, in Kazakhstan.
