= Mirzo Ulugbek =

Coordinates: 41.3294°N 69.3475°E

Mirzo Ulugbek Mirzo Ulug'bek
- District of Tashkent
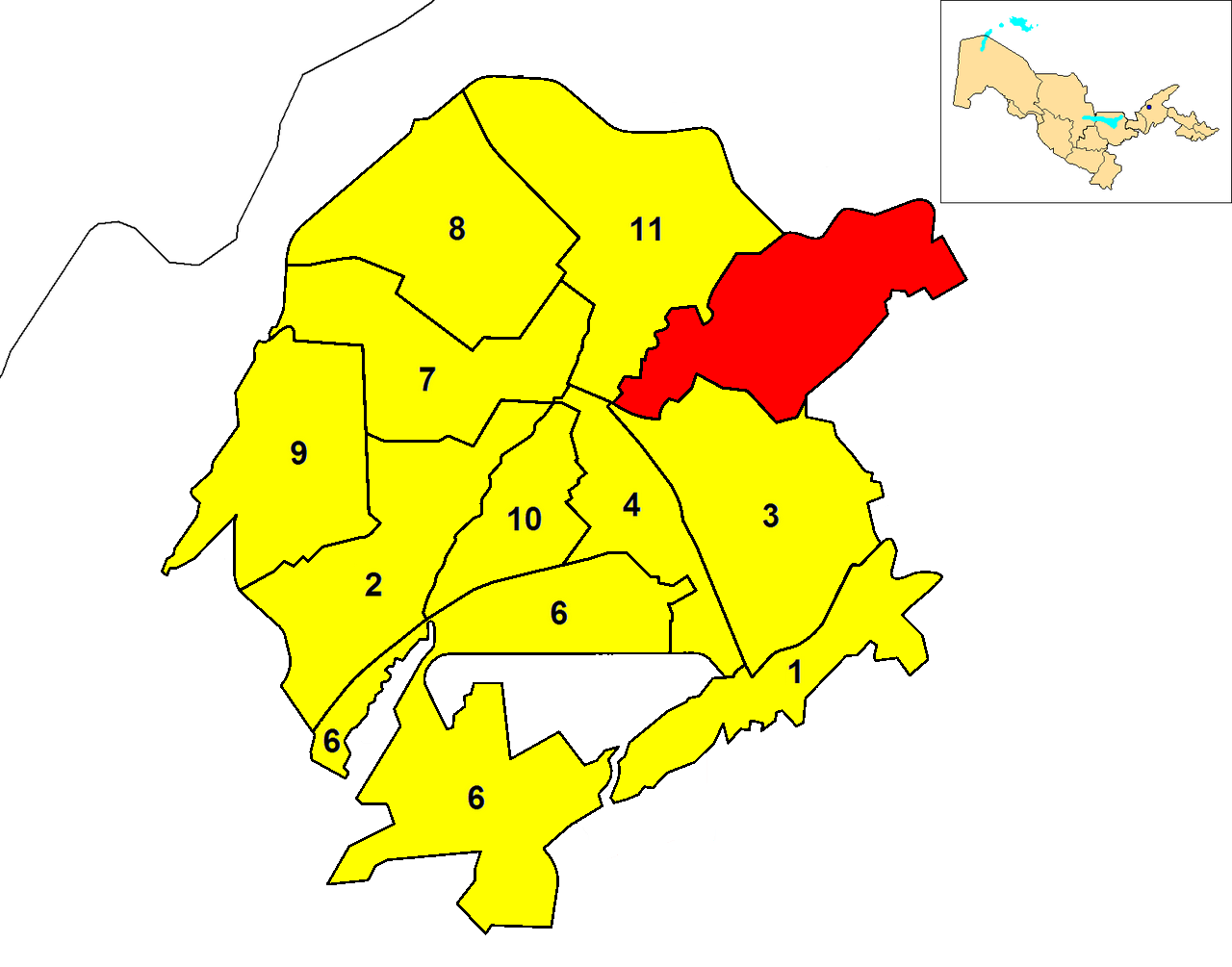
- Country: Uzbekistan
- Municipality: Tashkent
- Established: 1981

Area
  - Total: 35.15 km^{2} (13.57 sq mi)

Population (2021)
  - Total: 285,000
  - Density: 8,110/km^{2} (21,000/sq mi)

Mirzo Ulugbek (Uzbek: Mirzo Ulugʻbek tumani, Russian: Мирзо-Улугбекский район, romanized: Mirzo-Ulugbeksky rayon) is one of 12 districts (tuman) of Tashkent, the capital of Uzbekistan. It was named after the astronomer, mathematician and sultan Ulugh Beg. The urban-type settlement Ulugbek is part of the district.

== Overview ==
Mirzo Ulugbek is located in the northeastern part city. It was established in 1981 as Kuybyshev, after the Russian revolutionary leader Valerian Kuybyshev.

Mirzo Ulugbek borders the districts of Yunusabad and Yashnobod, and is adjacent to Tashkent Province.
