= Roads in Uzbekistan =

A list of roads in Uzbekistan.

On July 2024, in a cabinet ruling, the latest set of road classification and numbers were finalized. In this ruling, the Soviet-era highway numbers were retained for "roads of international significance", but the road numbering was overhauled for "roads of state significance" and "roads of local significance".

This superseded and annulled an earlier cabinet ruling from August 2010, which affirmed and documented the same 3 levels of roadway, but retained the codes from the Soviet era.

== Systems ==
The highways in Uzbekistan are divided into the 5 following groups, based on the level of their significance whose names differ by a code letter.

- T - "toll highways", classified and designed according to international motorway standards;
- M – highways of international significance; their names and kilometer was retained by the road network of the Soviet Union;
- A – highways of international significance, 3-digit number; their names and kilometer was retained by the road network of the Soviet Union;
- D – highways of state significance (Uzbek: Davlat ahamiyatiga ega avtomobil yoʻllari); D001 to D240
- ##V – highways of local significance (a two digit number designating the region, same codes as those for Uzbek license plates, followed by "V" for viloyat)

== Motorways ==
The total length of these roads is 35 km. These class of roads are new, the first one opened on August 2026. There are more such roads that are planned or under construction. These roads are designed and signed as "motorways" with green directional signs, have a speed limit of 130 km/h, and have toll booths.

| Road | Direction | Length |
|---|---|---|
| T001 | Urganch — Xiva pullik avtomobil yo‘li | 35 km |

== International Highways ==
The total length of these roads is 3,833 km.

Below are the "highways of international significance", with a prefix "M" or "A", inheritted from the Soviet road network.

| Road | Direction | Length |
|---|---|---|
| M34 | Toshkent — Dushanbe; 0th km to 144th km Toshkent (D001) — Yangiyoʻl — Chinoz (M39) — Sirdaryo — A373a — Guliston — Xovos (A376) — Tajik international border ( РБ15 ) a break in the itinerary of this route 149th km to 160th km Tajik international border ( РБ15 ) — Qoʻshqand — Tajik international border ( РБ15 ) | 153 km |
| M37 | Samarqand — Ishtixon — Kattaqoʻrgʻon — Karmana — Buxoro — Olot — Turkmen international border ( M37 ) | 367 km |
| M37a | Samarqand Ring Road | 46 km |
| M39 | Almaty —Bishkek — Toshkent — Termiz; 805th km to 819th km Kazakh international border ( KZ13-03 ) — Gʻishtkoʻprik — Toshkent a break in the itinerary of this route (D001); 819th km to 1458th km Toshkent — Chinoz — Jizzax — Samarqand — Shahrisabz — Gʻuzor — Termiz | 628 km |
| M39a | Termiz Bypass — Hayraton — Afghan international border ( NH89 ) | 30 km |
| M41 | Bishkek — Dushanbe — Termiz; 578th km to 587th km Kyrgyz international border ( М-122 ) — Xonobod — Sultonobod (D138) a break in the itinerary of this route 1443rd km to 1622nd km Tajik international border ( РБ02 ) — Denov — Jarqoʻrgʻon — Termiz | 188 km |
| A373 | Toshkent — Osh; Toshkent — Ohangaron — Angern — Qoʻqon — Shahrixon — Andijon — Kyrgyz international border ( ЭМ-15 ) | 379 km |
| A373a | Ohangaron — Guliston — Sardoba | 129 km |
| A373b | 192nd km of A373 — Qoʻqon | 66 km |
| A376 | 0th km to 47th km Qoʻqon — Beshariq — Tajik international border ( РБ14 ) a break in the itinerary of this route 163rd km to 300th km Tajik international border ( РҶ077 ) — Bekobod — Xovos — Jizzax | 153 km |
| A377 | Samarqand — Tajik international border ( РБ13 ) | 37 km |
| A378 | Samarqand — Gʻuzor | 152 km |
| A379 | Navoiy — Uchquduq | 289 km |
| A380 | Gʻuzor — Qarshi — Muborak — Buxoro — Tuproqqalʼa — Beruniy — Nukus — Xoʻjayli — Qoʻngʻirot — Kazakh international border ( KZ12-02 ) | 1,204 km |
| A381 | Xoʻjayli — Turkmen international border ( A381 ) | 12 km |

== State highways ==
The total length of these roads is 14,316 km.

These roads are designated from D001 to D240, with branches and variants being labelled using minuscule Latin letters, e.g. "D025e" (862nd km of M39 — Chinoz). The total length of these roads is 14,316 km.

=== D001 to D040 ===
| Road | Direction | Former Equivalent | Length |
|---|---|---|---|
| D001 | Toshkent Ring Road; M39 (to Chinoz) — D031 — D003 — D004 — M39 (to the Kazakh border) — D005 — D006 — D001a — D027 — D029 — A373 — D002 — D021 — M34 — M39 (to Chinoz) | M39b | 67 km |
| D001a | 34th km of D001 — Kuksaroy Palace/Doʻrmon | 4R1a | 5 km |
| D002 | Toshkent (D001) — Nurafshon (D014/D022) — 44th km of A373 | 4R2 | 49 km |
| D003 | 13th km of D001 - Qushqoʻndi - Kazakh international border ( KZ13-01 ) 41.3638, 69.0573 | 4R3 | 13 km |
| D004 | 49th km of D001 - Keles - Koʻksaroy - 820th km of M39 | 4R4 | 28 km |
| D004a | 2nd km of D004 - Navoiy/Sariyogʻoch Border Post | 4R4a | 6 km |
| D005 | Toshkent (D001) — Qibray — May (D008) | 4R5 | 21 km |
| D005a | 11th km of D005 — Qibray Centre | 4R5a | 2 km |
| D006 | Toshkent (D001) — Chirchiq (D008) — Chimgan | 4R6 | 87 km |
| D006a | 4th km of D006 - Kuksaroy Palace/Doʻrmon | 4R6a | 2 km |
| D006b | Argin (5th km of D006) - Writers' Union Resort; 41.3854, 69.43603 | 4R6b | 1 km |
| D006d | 23rd km of D006 (D012d) - Chirchiq Centre (Chirchiq Airbase) | | 6 km |
| D006e | 38th km of D006 - Semurgʻ Resort (Xondaylik); 41.6103, 69.7523 | 4R6v | 10 km |
| D006f | 66th km of D006 - Bildirsoy Resort; 41.5155, 69.9697 | 4R6g | 5 km |
| D006g | 76th km of D006 - Chimgan Resort; 41.5636, 70.0184 | 4R6g | 5 km |
| D007 | Chortoq (8th km of D021) — Niyozboshi — Qoʻshyogʻoch — 41st km of M34 | 4R7 | 34 km |
| D007a | 29th km of D007 — Yangiyoʻl Centre | 4R7a | 6 km |
| D008 | 813th km of M39 — May (D005) — Chirchiq (D006) | 4R8 | 23 km |
| D009 | Piskent (27th km of A373) — Boʻka (D020) — Olimkent (D022) | 4R9 | 33 km |
| D010 | Lake Chorbogʻ Ring Road | 4R10 | 82 km |
| D010a | 1st km of D010 — Chorbogʻ (Bridge over Chirchiq River) | 4R10b | 2 km |
| D010b | 71st km of D010 — Qaynarsoy; 41.6962, 70.0045 | 4R10a | 16 km |
| D011 | Gʻazalkent (D006) — Qizilsuv — Chorbogʻ (D010) | 4R11 | 17 km |
| D012 | Bektemir (D002/D021) — Chirchiq — Gʻazalkent — Chorbogʻ (D010) | 4R12 | 77 km |
| D012a | 2nd km of D012 — 6th km of A373 | | 6 km |
| D012b | 17th km of D012 — Yangibozor (D014/D015) | 4R12a | 4 km |
| D012d | 32nd km of D012 — Chirchiq | 4R12b | 4 km |
| D012e | 55th km of D012 — Gʻazalkent - D006 | 4R12v | 2 km |
| D013 | Chirchiq City Bypass Highway (Under Construction); 41.45278, 69.51669 | | 11 km |
| D014 | Gʻazalkent (D012) — Chirchiq — Yangibozor (D012a/D015) — Jumabozor (D016) — Oʻrtasaroy (A373) — Nurafshon (D002) | 4R14 | 72 km |
| D015 | 33rd km of D002 — Qiziltogʻ (D016) — Parkent — Yangibozor (D012a/D014) | 4R15 | 69 km |
| D016 | 9th km of D012 — Bordonkoʻl — Jumabozor (D014) — Qiziltogʻ (D015) | 4R16 | 27 km |
| D017a | 45th km of A373 — Olmaliq | 4R17j | 7 km |
| D017b | 94th km of A373 — Angern | 4R17b | 4 km |
| D017d | 192nd km of A373 (D105) — Tajik international border ( РБ19 ) | 4R17g | 7 km |
| D017e | 334th km of A373 (D105) — Andijon (D109) — 345th km of A373 (D132) | 4R17d | 13 km |
| D018 | 65th km of A373 — Shovvozsoy Reservoir and Forestry; 41.07100, 69.83882 | 4R287 | 28km |
| D020 | Qorasuv (D002) — Boʻka (D009/A373a) — Bekobod (A376) | 4R20 | 109 km |
| D020a | 23rd of D020 — Piskent | 4R20a | 8 km |
| D021 | Tashkent City Bypass Highway; D001 - D002/D012 | 4R21 | 22 km |
| D022 | Nurafshon (D002/D020) — Oqqoʻrgʻon (D024) — Yangiyoʻl (M34) | 4R22 | 60 km |
| D023 | Nurafshon (26th km of D002) — Piskent — 24th km of A373a | 4R19 | 20 km |
| D024 | Chinoz (M34) — Doʻstobod — Oqqoʻrgʻon (D022) — 64th km of A373a | 4R24 | 20 km |
| D024a | 20th km of D024 — Doʻstobod | 4R24a | 3 km |
| D025a | 823rd km of M39 — Oʻrtaovul (M34) | 4R23a | 5 km |
| D025b | 833rd km of M39 — Yangiyoʻl | 4R23b | 3 km |
| D025d | 839th km of M39 — Yangiyoʻl (M34) | 4R23v | 8 km |
| D025e | 862nd km of M39 — Chinoz (M34) | 4R23g | 3 km |
| D025f | Qorayantoq (991st km of M39) — Jizzax | 4R23d | 3 km |
| D025g | 1095th km of M39 — Samarqand | 4R23e | 6 km |
| D025h | 1173rd km of M39 — Shahrisabz Airport | 4R23k | 3 km |
| D025i | 1349th km of M39 — Sayrob Tourist area — M39 | 4R23m | 3 km |
| D025j | 1379th km of M39 — Guliston — M39; 37.84159, 67.05106 | | 3 km |
| D025k | 1398th km of M39 — Sherobod — M39 | 4R23j | 11 km |
| D025l | 1426th km of M39 — Angor — M39 | 4R23z | 6 km |
| D025m | 1450th km of M39 — Uchqizil — M39a | 4R23i | 12 km |
| D025n | 1458th km of M39 — Termez River Port (75V020) | 4R23n | 6 km |
| D025o | 1458th km of M39 — Termez — M41/75V020a | 4R23o | 5 km |
| D025p | 1458th km of M39 — Termez Railway Station (75V021) | 4R23p | 4 km |
| D026 | 49th km of M34 — Chinoz — 865th km of M39 — Yallama — Kazakh international border ( KZ13-01 ) | 4R186 | 6 km |
| D027 | 36th km of D001 — Chingeldi; 41.33259, 69.45676 | 4R252 | 6 km |
| D028 | Toshkent (D029) — Baytqo‘rg‘on (D006); Qibray city Bypass Highway; AKA "Presidential Road" | 4R288 | 25 km |
| D029 | "Yangi Toshkent" Higwhay; Formerly called "Yango O‘zbekiston" Highway; Toshkent (D001) — Xitoytepa (D012) | 4R1v | 15 km |
| D030 | 10th km of D021 — Surum — Sergeli — Madaniyat — Mevazor (D022) — Sattorobd (D024); 40.89684, 68.86286 | 4R255 | 50 km |
| D031 | 7th km of D001 — Nazarbek — Harakat — Yonariq — Oybek; 41.27893, 69.03387 | 4R253 | 13 km |
| D032 | D015 — Parkent — Kumushkon Resort; 41.31635, 69.83547 | 4R187 | 20 km |
| D032a | 2nd km of D032 — Parkent Centre — D015 | 4R187a | 4 km |
| D033 | Parkent (D015) — Zarkent) — Soʻqoq | 4R254 | 14 km |
| D034a | 15th km of A373a — Olmaliq | 4R18b | 10 km |
| D034b | 113th km of A373a — Guliston (M34) | 4R18a | 20 km |
| D035 | 74th km of A373a — Sayxun — Baxt (M34) — Kazakh international border ( KX-100 ) 40.684162, 68.647993 | 4R25 | 33 km |
| D036 | Sirdaryo (M34) — A373a — Dehqonobod (D037) — Qiyot — Bekobod (D020) | 4R26 | 105 km |
| D036a | 8th km of D036 — 871st km M39/M34; 40.89509, 68.69652 | 4R26a | 12 km |
| D036b | 96th km of D036 — A376 — Tajik international border ( РҶ067 / РҶ091 ) | 4R26b | 1 km |
| D037 | Guliston — Dehqonobod (D036) | 4R27 | 20 km |
| D038 | Guliston — A373a — Kazakh international border ( KZ13-01 ) 40.57600, 68.61763 | 4R28 | 20 km |
| D039 | Sirdaryo (69th km of M34) — 882nd km of M39 — Kazakh international border ( KZ13-01 ) 40.83463, 68.56668 | 4R29 | 12 km |
| D040 | Guliston (M34) — Markaz — Boyovut — 198th km of A376 | 4R30 | 51 km |

=== D041 to D080 ===
| Road | Direction | Former Equivalent | Length |
|---|---|---|---|
| D041 | Yangiyer (M34) — M39 — Doʻstlik (D047) — Bunyodkor (D061) | 4R31 | 97 km |
| D041a | 58th km of D041 — Gagarin (D047) | 4R31a | 10 km |
| D042 | Yangiyer (M34) — D058 — D045 — D060 — M39 — Paxtakor (D047) — 21st km of D049 | 4R32 | 93 km |
| D043 | Yangiyer (M34) — Jizzax Water Stn. (D058) — 10th km of D045 — D060 — M39 — Uchtepa (D050) | 4R196 | 75 km |
| D043a | 3rd km of D043 — Yangiyer | 4R196a | 5 km |
| D044 | Xovos (M34/215th km of A376) — Xovos Railway Station | 4R44a | 2 km |
| D045 | Dashtobod (A376/D052) — D058 — D043 — 115th km of A373a interrupted by Sardoba Reservoir (2017) | 4R33 | 48 km |
| D046 | Jizzax (A376) — Ravot — Pishagʻor (D060) — Zomin (D052) — Savot — Tajik international border 40.11015, 68.82903 | 4R34 | 102 km |
| D046a | 102nd km of D046 — Havotogʻ sanatorium 40.05649, 68.86110 | 4R34a | 8 km |
| D047 | Jizzax (A376) — D050 — D057 — Paxtakor (D042) — Doʻstlik (D041/D062) — Gagarin (D041a/D061) — 918th km of M39 | 4R35 | 97 km |
| D047a | 24th km of D047 — Jizzax/Paxtakor Airbase | 4R35a | 2 km |
| D048 | Jizzax (D050) — D051 — D049 — Bogʻdon (D054/D056) — Qizilcha — 87th km of D191 | 4R36 | 198 km |
| D049 | Jizzax (D050/D057) — D051 — D042 — Chimqoʻrgʻon — 32nd km of D048 | 4R37 | 46 km |
| D050 | 962nd km of M39 — Uchtepa (D047) — Jizzax — 1013th km of M39 | 4R38 | 51 km |
| D051 | Uchtepa (D050) — D057 — D049 — Oqtom (D048) | 4R39 | 26 km |
| D052 | Dashtobod (A376/D045) — Zomin (D046) — Baxmal (D053) — Gʻallaorol (M39) | 4R40 | 182 km |
| D053 | 1022nd km of M39 — Oʻsmat — Baxmal (D052) | 4R41 | 62 km |
| D054 | Gʻallaorol (1017th km of M39) — Qoʻytosh — Bogʻdon (D048) | 4R42 | 91 km |
| D054a | 38th km of D054 — Qoʻytosh Centre | 4R42a | 2 km |
| D055 | 1031st km of M39 — Marjonbuloq (1017th km of M39) — D068 — Zarmitan — Qoʻshrabot (D074) | 4R43 | 108 km |
| D055a | 4th km of D055 — Lalmikor Railway Station | 4R43a | 2 km |
| D056 | Osmonsoy (D048) — Uchquloch — Uzunquduq — Bogʻdon (D048) | 4R240 | 46 km |
| D057 | Jizzax (D049/D050) — Chorvador — D051 — Paxtakor south (D047); 40.23266, 67.82548 | 4R284 | 28 km |
| D058 | 977th km of M39 — Zarbdor Oqar (D060) — D045 — D043 — Yangiyer west (8th km of D042); 40.18351, 68.30474 | 4R285 | 46 km |
| D059 | 54th km of D047 — Manas — 942nd km of M39; 40.43802, 68.16616 | 4R286 | 19 km |
| D060 | Pishagʻor (D046) — Zarbdor Railway Stn. (A376) — D058 — D043 — 56th km of D042 | 4R194 | 38 km |
| D061 | 82nd km of D042 — Zafarobod — D062 — D041 — Choʻlquvar — Gagarin (D047) | 4R197 | 85 km |
| D062 | Doʻstlik (D047) — Gʻoliblar — D061 | 4R198 | 20 km |
| D063 | 27th km of D031 — Paxtaobod — 59th km of D042; 40.35420, 68.20103 | 4R199 | 34 km |
| D063a | 16th km of D063 — 935th km of M39 | 4R199a | 4 km |
| D064a | 47th km of M37a — Samarkand International Airport | 4R45a | 6 km |
| D064b | 42nd km of M37a — Samarkand Centre | 4R45b | 4 km |
| D065 | Samarqand — M37a — Juma (D065a/D070) — Kattaqoʻrgʻon (D076e) | 4R46 | 67 km |
| D065a | 26th km of D065 — Juma Centre | 4R46a | 2 km |
| D066 | Bulungʻur (M39) — A377 — Urgut (D069/D083) — 1108th km of M39 | 4R47 | 80 km |
| D067 | Zarafshon Tract; Jomboy (M39) — Chelak (D068/D080) — Mitan (D074) — Ishtixon (D076d) — Payshanba (D081) — Kattaming — Yangirabod (D075/D075a/D210) — Bogʻchakalon (D210) — Paxtakor — Qalqonota (D191/D207) — Beshrabot (D207) — Konimex (A379/D192a) — Gʻijduvon (D076n/D172/D193) — Shofirkon (D172/D173) — Yangibozor (D198) — Romitan (D176) — A380 — Dalmun (D178) — Jondor (D067b/D076u/D182) — D183 — 324th km of M37 | 4R48 | 380 km |
| D067a | Northern Bypass of Yangirabod; 124th km of D067 — Yangirabod Centre (D075) | 4R48a | 7 km |
| D067b | 361st km of D067 (D182) — Jondor Centre (D076u) — D067/D182 | 4R48v | 5 km |
| D068 | Chelak (D067/D080) — Payariq (D084) — Ko'rsafar (D055) | 4R49 | 32 km |
| D069 | Toyloq (A377) — Urgut (D066) | 4R50 | 24 km |
| D070 | Juma (D065/D065a) — Xonchorbogʻ — 30th km of A378 | 4R51 | 22 km |
| D071 | Sarikoʻl (45th km of A378) — Nurobod (D072) — Sepki — Qarnob (D077) — South of Navoiy (D188) | 4R52 | 155 km |
| D072 | Nurobod (D071) — Nurbuloq — D065 — Ishtixon (M37) | 4R53 | 50 km |
| D073 | Kattaqoʻrgʻon (D076e) — D082 — Ingichka | 4R54 | 28 km |
| D074 | Mitan (D067) — Oqtepa (D084) — Qoʻshrabot (D055) — Chuya (D075) — Nurota (D191) | 4R55 | 126 km |
| D075 | Oqtosh — M37 — Yangirabod (D067/D075a/D210) — Langar — Chuya (D074) | 4R56 | 81 km |
| D075a | Eastern Bypass of Yangirabod; 12th km of D075 — Yangirabod North (D211) | 4R56a | 4 km |
| D076a | 28th km of M37 — Loyish — M37 | 4R58a | 6 km |
| D076b | 38th km of M37 — Yangiqoʻrgʻon — M37 | 4R58b | 8 km |
| D076d | 53rd km of M37 — Ishtixon (D067) — M37 | 4R58g | 6 km |
| D076e | 73rd km of M37 — Kattaqoʻrgʻon (D065/D073/D081) — M37 | 4R58d | 7 km |
| D076f | 127th km of M37 — Ziyovuddin | 4R58e | 7 km |
| D076g | 153rd km of M37 — Navoiy; Nizomiy koʻchasi | 4R64g | 4 km |
| D076h | Karmana (158th km of M37) — Navoiy; Karmana koʻchasi | 4N384g | 3 km |
| D076i | Karmana (159th km of M37/A379) — Navoiy; Islom Karimov koʻchasi | 4R64e | 3 km |
| D076j | Karmana (160th km of M37) — Navoiy; Alisher Navoiy koʻchasi | 4R64a | 3 km |
| D076k | 174th km of M37 — Navoiy International Airport | 4R64v | 1 km |
| D076l | 177th km of M37 — Navoi Free Industrial Economic Zone | M37b | 2 km |
| D076m | 202nd km of M37 — Qiziltepa (D189) — M37 | 4R64b | 6 km |
| D076n | 218th km of M37 — Gʻijduvon (D067/D172/D193) — M37 | 4R58k | 6 km |
| D076o | 263rd km of M37 — Sitorai Mohi xossa Palace Complex | 4R58l | 1 km |
| D076p | 263rd km of M37 — Sitorai Mohi xossa Sanatorium | 4R171e | 1 km |
| D076q | Buxoro (South of Mirzo Ulugʻbek Garden; 267th km of M37 — D154g; Vobkent koʻchasi | 4R58i | 2 km |
| D076r | 269th km of M37 — Buxoro Centre (Ark of Bukhara); Abu Hayz Kabir koʻchasi | 4R58v | 1 km |
| D076s | 269th km of M37 — 80V001; Abu Hayz Kabir koʻchasi | 4R58j | 2 km |
| D076t | 270th km of M37 (80V001) — Buxoro Centre; Mirdoʻstim koʻchasi | 4R58t | 1 km |
| D076u | 289th km of M37 — Jondor Centre (D067/D067b/D182) | 4R58m | 4 km |
| D076v | 304th km of M37 — Yakkatut Railway Station | 4R58o | 1 km |
| D076x | 328th km of M37 (Qorakoʻl Bus Terminal/D076y) — Qorakoʻl Railway Station (D184) | 4R58r | 2 km |
| D076y | 328th km of M37 (Qorakoʻl Bus Terminal/D076x) — Qorakoʻl Centre (D186) | 4R58p | 1 km |
| D076z | 340th km of M37 — Olot, Uzbekistan (D187) — M37 | 4R58s | 6 km |
| D076oʻ | 353rd km of M37 — Xoʻjadavlat Railway Station (D185) | 4R58z | 2 km |
| D077 | 125th km of M37 — Qarnob (D071) | 4R185 | 30 km |
| D078 | North of Samarqand (M39) — East of Bulungʻur (D066) — Barlos — Alamli | 4R241 | 60 km |
| D079 | Oqtosh (D055) — Xatcha/Juma — Obolin (D080); 39.90942, 66.98029 | 4R241 | 32 km |
| D080 | Bulungʻur (M39) — Qoʻlbosti — D079 — Chelak (D067/D068) | 4R242 | 44 km |

=== D081 to D120 ===
| Road | Direction | Former Equivalent | Length |
|---|---|---|---|
| D081 | Kattaqoʻrgʻon (D076e) — M37 — Payshanba (D067) | 4R243 | 12 km |
| D082 | Kattaqoʻrgʻon (D076e) — Kattaqoʻrgʻon Reservoir — Qizilchorbogʻ — D073 | 4R244 | 15 km |
| D083 | Samarkand (M37a/M39) — Urgut (D066) | 4R246 | 26 km |
| D084 | Oqtepa (D074) — Qoʻrli — Dehqonobod — Payariq (D068) | 4R247 | 38 km |
| D085 | 5th km of A376 — Oxunqaynar (D098) — Qoʻqon Airport (D097) — Qaqir (Qoʻqon Free Economic Zone)(40V056) | | 20 km |
| D086 | Marg‘ilon (D087/D087a/D093/40V020) — Yozyovon (A373) — Sariqsuv (D131) — Oqoltin (D142) — Terakzor (D129) | 4R127 | 46 km |
| D086a | Marg‘ilon (3rd km of D086) — Toshloq (D087b) — D087 | 4R127a | 10 km |
| D087 | Qumtepa (D093/40V034) — Marg‘ilon (D086) — Quva (D100/D105/D141) — Marhamat (D140) — Kyrgyz international border ( М-090 ) | 4R140 | 68 km |
| D087a | 6th km of D087 — Marg‘ilon Railway Station (D086/40V020) — Farg‘ona (D105); Zarafshon koʻchasi, Turkiston koʻchasi, Ipak yoʻli koʻchasi | 4R140a | 11 km |
| D087b | 11th km of D087 — Toshloq (D086a); Muqimiy ko‘chasi | 4R140b | 3 km |
| D088 | Quvasoy (D089/D103a) — So‘fan (D102) — Arsif (D105) | 4R142 | 22 km |
| D089 | Farg‘ona (D091) — Quvasoy (D088/D103a) — Kyrgyz international border | 4R142 | 25 km |
| D090 | 0th km to 25th km Fargʻona (D091) — Vodil (D090a/D094) — Kyrgyz international border 25th km to 30th km Kyrgyz international border — Shohimardon (Access to Shohimardon exclave) | 4R144 | 30 km |
| D090a | Vodil (D090) — "Residence" and other historic sites (D094); 40.186569, 40.186569 | 4R144v | 1 km |
| D091 | Fargʻona City Ring Highway; Yangi Marg‘ilon (D105/40V034) — D091a — D092 — Fargʻona Airport (D105l) — Southern Fargʻona (D090/D103) — Eastern Fargʻona (D089) — D105 | 4R145 | 22 km |
| D091a | 6th km of D091 — Fargʻona Horse Tracks (D092) | | 2 km |
| D091b | 12 km of D091 (D089) — Beshbola (D091d); 40.399949, 71.815023 | | 5 km |
| D091d | 15th km of D091 — D091b — D105; Quva koʻchasi | | 3 km |
| D092 | Fargʻona (D091) — Chimyon (D094) | 4R146 | 30 km |
| D093 | Qumtepa/West Marg‘ilon (D087/40V034) — Oltiariq (D094) — Rishton (D101/D105) — Sariqoʻrgʻon (D097) — O‘qchi dasht — D098 — Tajik international border ( РБ14 ) | 4R147 | 102 km |
| D093a | Oyimcha (1st km of D093) — Sarmazor (40V034/40V034a) — Marg‘ilon Railway Station (40V020); Oʻrizkor koʻchasi, Mullaqayrogoʻch koʻchasi, Sharq koʻchasi | 4R147a | 4 km |
| D093b | Rishton (42nd km of D093) — Rishton Centre (D095); Shokir Ota koʻchasi. Konstitutsiya koʻchasi | | 2 km |
| D094 | 232nd km of A373 — D094a — D094a — Oltiariq (D093) — D094b/D105 — Chimyon (D092) — Kyrgyz territory (access to Jangail) — Vodil (D090/D090a) | 4R148 | 76 km |
| D094a | 54th km of D094 — Bagʻdod (D105) — Furqat Railway Station | 4R148a | 23 km |
| D094b | 55th km of D094 — Oltiariq Railway Station Poloson (D093) — D094/D105 | 4R148b | 11 km |
| D095 | Rishton (D093b/D105) — Kyrgyz international border ( ЭМ-21 ) (A break in the itinerary of this route, access to Soʻx exclave); Kyrgyz international border ( ЭМ-21 ) — Soʻx — Kyrgyz international border ( ЭМ-21 ) | 4R149 | 38 km |
| D096 | Qoʻqon (A373b/D097) — Mulkobod — Xo‘jaqishloq (58th km of D129) | 4R150 | 22 km |
| D097 | Qoʻqon (D096/D099) — Mingtut — Qoʻqon Airport (D085) Sariqoʻrgʻon (D093) | 4R153 | 27 km |
| D098 | Qoʻqon (A376) — Oxunqaynar (D085) — Yaypan — D093 — Tajik international border ( РБ18 ) | 4R154 | 33 km |
| D099 | Qoʻqon City Bypass Highway; A373b — A376 — D097 — D105 | 4R17e | 13 km |
| D100 | Quva City Bypass Highway; D105 — D105 — D087 — D105 | | 11 km |
| D101 | Rishton City Bypass Highway; D105 — D093 — D105 | 4K920d | 10 km |
| D102 | Ko‘prikboshi (212th km of D105) — Qabulbek — So‘fan (D088) — Kyrgyz international border ( М-092 ) | 4R204 | 24 km |
| D103 | Fargʻona (D091) — Avval — D103a — Gulpiyon — Kyrgyz international border ( ЭМ-16 ) | 4R205 | 21 km |
| D103a | 19th km of D103 — Quvasoy (D088/D089) | 4R205a | 6 km |
| D104 | Namangan (D105) — Beshkapa — Choʻlobod (D129) | 4R81 | 14 km |
| D105 | Fergana Ring Highway; 192nd km of A373 (D017d) — Pop (D105a/D105b/D119) — Chust (D105d/D114/D116) — D110 — Toʻraqoʻrgʻon (D113) — D105e — Namangan (D104/D105f/D105g/D106/D107/D108/D108a/D109/D123) — Jiydakapa (D111) — Pastki Choʻja D115 — Baliqchi (D129/D130) — Chinobod (D127/D131) — Qoʻshtepasaroy (D105h) — Oltinkoʻl (D105i) — Andijon (A373/D017e/D132/D132a) — Asaka (D105k/D140) — Quva (D087/D100) — D088 — Fargʻona (D087a/D091/D091d/D105l) — Oltiariq (D094/D094b) — Rishton (D093/D095/D101) — Bagʻdod (D094a) — Qoʻqon (A373b/D099) | 4R112 | 305 km |
| D105a | 28th km of D105 — Pop Centre (D119); Sobir Rahimov ko‘chasi | 4R112z | 3 km |
| D105b | 29th km of D105 — Pop Centre (D114/D119); Hazartibob ko‘chasi | 4R112d | 1 km |
| D105d | 44th km of D105 — Chust (Ring Road) (D114/D116) | 4R112g | 14 km |
| D105e | 74th km of D105 — Namangan Airport | 4R112a | 2 km |
| D105f | 76th km of D105 — Namangan Centre (D107/D123); G’alaba ko’chasi 40.993199, 71.611998 | 4R112a | 4 km |
| D105g | 76th km of D105 — 4th km of D107; Kosonsoy ko’chasi 41.002988, 71.585161 | 4R112j | 3 km |
| D105h | Qoʻshtepasaroy (123rd km of D105) — Shahrixon (A373/D140/D141) | 4R112v | 14 km |
| D105i | Oltinkoʻl (134th km of D105) — 14th km of D136 | 4R112b | 2 km |
| D105j | Andijon Ring Road (155km of D105/A373) — Andijon Airport — D105/D017e | | 1 km |
| D105k | 163rd km of D105 — Asaka Centre (D140); Fidoiy ko’chasi, Humo ko’chasi | 4R112e | 4 km |
| D105l | 218th km of D105 — Fargʻona Airport (D091) | | 3 km |
| D106 | Namangan East (91st km of D105) — Namangan Centre (D109/D110) — Radivon (D120a) — Yangiqoʻrgʻon (D111/D120) — Kalishoh (D112); Qodir Otamirzayev koʻchasi | 4R113 | 41 km |
| D107 | Namangan (D105f/D110) — Goʻrmiron (D107a) — Kosonsoy (D107b/D112/D113) — Kyrgyz international border ( М-110 ) | 4R114 | 37 km |
| D107a | Goʻrmiron (23rd km of D107) — Chindovul (D113) | 4R114a | 2 km |
| D107b | Kosonsoy Eastern Bypass; 29th km of D107 — D118 — D113 — D107 | 4R114b | 8 km |
| D108 | Namangan Centre (D105) — Xonobod (D108a) — Toshbuloq — Qatagʻonsaroy (D113a) — Shohand (D108b) — D113 | 4R115 | 6 km |
| D108a | Xonobod (D108) — Namangan Centre (D105); Yangiobod koʻchasi | 4R115b | 6 km |
| D108b | Shohand (20th km of D108) — Oqtosh (D113a) | 4R115a | 9 km |
| D109 | Namangan (D105/D106) — Uychi (D111/D125) — Birlashgan (D110) — Uchqoʻrgʻon (D126/D128) — Haqqulobod (D115/D127) — Poytugʻ (D134) — Kuyganyor (D133/D136) — Andijon (D017e/D132/D132a/D132b/D137) | 4R116 | 93 km |
| D110 | Namangan Northern Bypass Highway; D105 — Toʻraqoʻrgʻon (D113) — Namangan (D106/D107/D118/D120/D123) — Chortoq (D110a/D111) — Keskanyor — Birlashgan (D109) | 4R117 | 59 km |
| D110a | 39th km of D110 — Chortoq Centre (D110/D111) | 4R117a | 3 km |
| D111 | Jiydakapa (D105) — Uychi (D109/D125) — Chortoq (D110/D110a) — D112 — Yangiqoʻrgʻon (D106/D120) — Iskavot (D113) — Zarkent (D112) — Nanay — Kyrgyz international border (Chorbogʻ) | 4R118 | 72 km |
| D111a | Nanay (71st km of D111) — Koʻksaroy Resort/Kyrgyz international border (Yangi-Ovul) | 4R118a | 3 km |
| D112 | North of Chortoq (D111) — Kalishoh (D106) — Hazratishoh — Zarkent (D111) | 4R119 | 50 km |
| D113 | Iskavot (D111) — Kosonsoy (D107/D107b/D114) — Tergachi (D114a) — Toʻraqoʻrgʻon (D105/D110/D124) — Buramatut (D113a) — D108 — Joʻmashoʻy (D122/D129/D129a) — 27th km of A373 | 4R120 | 94 km |
| D113a | Buramatut (D113) — Oqtosh (D108b/D124) — Qatagʻonsaroy (D108) | 4R120a | 13 km |
| D114 | Kosonsoy (D113) — Ravot (D114a) — Chust (D105/D105d/D116) — Toʻda/Chust Railway Station — Xoʻjaobod/Pop Railway Station — Pop (D105a/D105b/D119) — Navbahor (D122/D129) | 4R121 | 91 km |
| D114a | Ravot (15th km of D114) — Tergachi (D113) | 4R121a | 5 km |
| D115 | Pastki Choʻja (D105) — Norinkapa — Haqqulobod (D109/D127) | 4R122 | 25 km |
| D116 | Chust (D105d/D114) — Axcha — 50V061 (Pop-Madaniyat Hwy.) | 4R123 | 24 km |
| D117 | Gʻurumsaroy (D119) — D105 — Xonobod — Chodak — Guliston | 4R125 | 37 km |
| D118 | Namangan (D105/D110) — Isparon — Kosonsoy (D107b) | 4R214 | 35 km |
| D119 | Pungon (A373b) — A373 — Gʻurumsaroy (D117) — Pop (D105a/D105b/D114) — D105 | 4R215 | 36 km |
| D120 | Namangan (D110) — D120a — Yangiqoʻrgʻon (D111) | 4R127 | 14 km |
| D120a | 12th km of D120 — Radivon (D106) | 4R127a | 3 km |

=== D121 to D160 ===
| Road | Direction | Former Equivalent | Length |
|---|---|---|---|
| D121a | A373 Kamchik Pass Highway Bypass (Righthand/Southbound Side); 141st km of A373 — A373 | 4R237a | 13 km |
| D121b | A373 Kamchik Pass Highway Bypass (Lefthand/Northbound Side) — A373 — 142nd km of A373 | 4R237b | 9 km |
| D122 | Joʻmashoʻy (D113/D129) — Tegirmon(D129) — Navbahor (D114/D129) — A373 —Buvayda (D122a) — Qoʻqon (A373b/D096) | 4R260 | 24 km |
| D122a | Buvayda (53rd km of D122) — Ibrat (A373) | 4R260a | 10 km |
| D123 | Namangan North (21st km of D110) — D105 — D105f — Namangan Railway Station; G‘irvonsoy ko‘chasi | 4R261 | 4 km |
| D124 | Toʻraqoʻrgʻon (D113) — Oqtosh (D113a) | 4R262 | 8 km |
| D125 | Uychi City Bypass Highway; D105 — D093 — D105 | 4R263 | 11 km |
| D126 | Uchqoʻrgʻon (D109/D128) — Ittifoq — Kyrgyz international border (Shamaldy-Say, towards ЭМ-04 ) | 4R116a | 11 km |
| D127 | Haqqulobod (D109/D115) — Eski Haqqulobod (D136) — Chinobod (D105) | 4R116b | 15 km |
| D128 | Uchqoʻrgʻon (D109/D126) — Boʻston — Kyrgyz international border (Qiziltov, ЭМ-04 ) | 4R116v | 10 km |
| D129 | Baliqchi (D195/D130) — Choʻlobod (D104) — Terakzor (D086) — Joʻmashoʻy (D113/D122/D129a) — Tegirmon(D122) — Navbahor (D114/D122) — A373 — Chagʻali (9th km of A373b) | 4R126 | 94 km |
| D129a | 34th km of D129 — Joʻmashoʻy Centre (D122) — D113 | 4R126a | 4 km |
| D130 | Boʻston (Boʻz) (A373) — Oʻrmonbek (D131) — Baliqchi (D105/D130) | 4R128 | 27 km |
| D131 | Chinobod (D105) — Oʻrmonbek (D130) — Sariqsuv (D086) | 4R129 | 28 km |
| D132 | Andijon Ring Road; D105/D132a (Andijon West) — D109 (Andijon North) — D 132b — D136 — D143 —Zavroq (A373/D017e) | 4R130 | 31 km |
| D132a | 0th km of D132/D105 — Andijon Centre (D109); Oltinko‘l ko‘chasi | 4R130a | 5 km |
| D132b | 11th km of D132/D105 — Andijon Centre (D109); Asad Ismatov ko‘chasi | 4R130b | 2 km |
| D133 | Kuyganyor (D109) — Qizil koʻprik (D134) — Izboskan (Madaniyat) (D135) — Kyrgyz international border (towards ЭМ-04 ) | 4R131 | 21 km |
| D134 | Poytugʻ (D109) — Qizil koʻprik (D133) — Paxtaobod (D135/D137a) — Pushmon — Kyrgyz international border (towards Bozorqoʻrgʻon) | 4R132 | 31 km |
| D135 | Paxtaobod (D134/D137a) — Izboskan (Madaniyat) (D133) | 4R133 | 20 km |
| D136 | Kuyganyor (D109/D136a) — Siza — D105i — Eski Haqqulobod (D127) | 4R134 | 24 km |
| D136a | 1st km of D136 — Kuyganyor Centre | | 1 km |
| D137 | Andijon (D109/D132) — Quruqqayrag‘och (D137a/D144/D145) — Oyim (D143) — Qoʻrgʻontepa (D138) — Yorqishloq (373rd km of A373/D144) | 4R135 | 66 km |
| D137a | Quruqqayrag‘och (12th km of D137/D144/D145) — Paxtaobod (D134/D135) | 4R135a | 8 km |
| D138 | Ko‘tarma (A373) — Jalaquduq (D144) — Qoʻrgʻontepa (D137) — Qorasuv (D138a) — Sultonobod (M41) — Topolino | 4R136 | 45 km |
| D138a | Qorasuv (31st km of D138) — Kyrgyz international border (towards М-091 ) | 4R136a | 2 km |
| D139 | Xoʻjaobod (A373) — Buloqboshi — Kulla — Oʻqchi (D140) | 4R137 | 25 km |
| D140 | Shahrixon (D105h/D141) — Asaka (D105/D105k) — Oʻqchi (D139) — Marhamat (D087) — Kyrgyz international border ( М-092 ) | 4R138 | 50 km |
| D140a | 46th km of D140 — Marhamat West (D087) | 4R138a | 3 km |
| D141 | 304th km of A373 — Shahrixon (D105h/D140) — Quva (D105) | 4R139 | 29 km |
| D142 | D113 — Oqoltin (D086) — West of Boʻston (Boʻz) (A373) | 4R141 | 24 km |
| D143 | Andijon (D017e/D132) — Janubiy Olamushuk (D144) — Oyim (D137) — Dardoq — Xonobod (585th km of M41) | 4R248 | 69 km |
| D144 | Quruqqayrag‘och (D137/D137a/D145) — Janubiy Olamushuk (D143) — Jalaquduq (D138) — Yorqishloq (D137) | 4R249 | 42 km |
| D145 | Andijon North (D132) — uz:Chumbogʻich — Quruqqayrag‘och (D137/D137a/D144) | 4R250 | 19 km |
| D146 | Xidirsha (348th km of A373) — Buloqboshi (D139) | 4R251 | 10 km |
| D147 | Qarshi (A380/70V001) — Xonobod — Chim (A378) — Chiroqchi (D148) — Shahrisabz (M39) | 4R79 | 102 km |
| D148 | Eski Yakkabogʻ — Yakkabogʻ (M39) — Chiroqchi (D147) — Yettitom (A378) Shoʻrbozor (D156); 39.28803, 66.12463 | 4R84 | 85 km |
| D149 | Qiziltepa (M39) — Langar — Maydanak; 38.673568, 66.896415 | 4R86 | 66 km |
| D150 | 85th km of A378 — Qarshi (A380/70V001) | 4R86 | 66 km |
| D151 | Shoʻrtan/Mangʻit (A380) — Shoʻrtan gas-chemical complex | 4R88 | 32 km |
| D152 | Qarshi (A380/D153b/D154a/70V001) — Yangi Nishon — D158 — D152a — Turkmen international border (towards Kerki, P89 ) | 4R89 | 60 km |
| D152a | 56th km of D152 — Tallimarjon | 4R89a | 12 km |
| D153 | Qarshi — D153b — D153a — Beshkent — Qamashi — Mugʻlon (D155) — Koson (A380/D159) | 4R90 | 64 km |
| D153a | 3rd km of D153 — Gʻubdin — D155 — Shayxali/Qashqadaryo Railway Station (A380) | 4R90a | 11 km |
| D153b | 1st km of D153 — Qarshi Airport — D152 | 4R90b | 6 km |
| D154a | 48th km of A380 (D152) — Qarshi Railway Station; Gʻuzor koʻchasi, Mazhab koʻchasi | 4R91v | 3 km |
| D154b | Qarshi (51st km of A380) — 70V001 — (break in the itinerary, passing through Qarshi-Xonobod airbase) — Xonobod | 4R91j | 3 km |
| D154d | Qarshi (60th km of D152) — "Inturist" Inn; 38.888643, 65.822240 | 4R91b | 2 km |
| D154e | 212th km of A380 — Kogon/Buxoro-1 Railway Station — A380/D189; Buxoro koʻchasi, Mahmud Tarobiy koʻchasi | 4R91e | 4 km |
| D154f | 219th km of A380 — Bukhara International Airport (D188b) | 4R91d | 3 km |
| D154g | 224th km of A380 — Buxoro Centre (M37); Choʻplon koʻchasi, Abu Ali ibn Sino koʻchasi | 4R91g | 3 km |
| D154h | 227th km of A380 — M37; Shexon koʻchasi | 4R171e | 4 km |
| D154i | Gazli (327th km of A380) — Bukhara-Ural Gas Pipeline Compressor Station | 4R171v | 15 km |
| D154j | 591st km of A380 — Toʻrtkoʻl Centre (D239) — 600th km of A380 | 4R171b | 9 km |
| D154k | 623rd km of A380 — Beruniy Centre — 632nd km of A380 | 4R171a | 9 km |
| D154l | 775km of A380 — Taxiatosh Centre — 770th km of A380 | 4R171g | 12 km |
| D154m | 794th km of A380 — Xoʻjayli Centre (D232) — 785th km of A380 | 4R171d | 9 km |
| D155 | Qarshi (D153a) — Tolliqoʻrgʻon — Mugʻlon (D155) — Jeynov — Pomuq (D157/D158) | 4R92 | 73 km |
| D156 | 76th km of A380 — Poʻlati — Shoʻrbozor (D148) — Ayritom | 4R95 | 72 km |
| D157 | Muborak (Oltingugurt) Gas Processing Plant (142nd km of A380) — Pomuq (D155/D157) — Oʻrtabuloq gas field 38.996013, 64.492961 | 4R96 | 80 km |
| D158 | Muborak (A380/D159) — Pomuq (D155/D157) — Balhiyoq — D152 | 4R97 | 108 km |
| D159 | Koson (D153) — Qarliq — D157 — Muborak (D158) | 4R234 | 43 km |
| D160 | 1158th km of M39 — Kitob — Shahrisabz — 1173rd km of M39 | 4R23l | 15 km |

=== D161 to D200 ===
| Road | Direction | Former Equivalent | Length |
|---|---|---|---|
| D161 | M39 — Darband — D161a — Boysun (D161b/D162) — Tangimush (D167) — Elbayon (M41) | 4R105 | 94 km |
| D161a | 12th km of D161 — Sayrob (M39) | 4R105b | 14 km |
| D161b | 30th km of D161 — Boysun Centre | 4R105a | 6 km |
| D162 | Qumqoʻrgʻon (M41) — D167 — Kofrun — Boysun (D162) | 4R104 | 63 km |
| D163 | North of Sherobod (1391th km of M39) — Pashxurt — Oqtosh — Ozod Vatan — 1421th km of M39 | 4R110 | 96 km |
| D164 | Sherobod (D025k) — Sariq (D167) — Surxon (M41) | 4R103 | 45 km |
| D165 | Jarqoʻrgʻon (M41/D167) — M39 — Navshahar — Boldir — Turkmen international border (towards Köýtendag, P37 ) | 4R102 | 85 km |
| D166 | Termiz (D025n/D025o/D025p) — Namuna — Termez International Airport (D167) | 4R206 | 12 km |
| D167 | Manguzar/Termiz East (M41/D168) — Termez International Airport (D166) — M39a — Jarqoʻrgʻon (D165/D167a) — D167b — Sariq (D164) — D162 — Tangimush (D161) — D167d — Denov (D167e/D170d) | 4R100 | 174 km |
| D167a | 43rd km of D167 — Jarqoʻrgʻon Centre (M41) | 4R100b | 11 km |
| D167b | 63rd km of D167 — 1418th km of M39 | 4R100a | 9 km |
| D167d | 165th km of D167 — Yangi Hazorbogʻ | 4R100v | 3 km |
| D167e | 171st km of D167 — Denov South (M41/D170d) | 4R100g | 3 km |
| D168 | Manguzar/Termiz East (M41/D167) — Xotinrabot — Tajik international border ( РБ11 ) | 4R99/A384 | 49 km |
| D169 | Jarqoʻrgʻon (M41) — Kakaydi — Qorsoqli (D169a) — Qoʻshcheka (D169b) — Ulanqul (D169d) — Jonchekka (D169e) — Tajik international border | 4R101 | 136 km |
| D169a | Qorsoqli (40th km of D169) — Qumqoʻrgʻon (M41) | 4R101a | 5 km |
| D169b | Qoʻshcheka (77th km of D169) — Shoʻrchi (M41) | 4R101b | 6 km |
| D169d | Ulanqul (110th km of D169) — Denov (M41/D170d) | 4R101g | 8 km |
| D169e | Jonchekka (127th km of D169) — Uzun (D170a) | 4R101v | 7 km |
| D170a | 1445th km of M41 — Uzun (D169e/D170b) | 4R108a | 15 km |
| D170b | 1462nd km of M41 — Sariosiyo — Uzun (D169e/D170a) | 4R108b | 12 km |
| D170d | 147th km of M41 — Denov Centre (D167/D167e/D169d) — 1487th km of M41 | 4R108v | 13 km |
| D171 | North of Denov (M41) — Xonjiza — Chosh; 38.69576, 67.65554 | 4R107 | 75 km |
| D172 | Gʻijduvon (M37/D067/D076n/D193) — Shofirkon (D067/D173) | 4K147 | 16 km |
| D173 | Vobkent (238th of M37/D173a) — Shofirkon (D067/D172) — Jilvon Desert Area; 40.38519, 64.59632 | 4R220 | 42 km |
| D173a | 3rd km of D173 — Vobkent Centre — D198 | 4R220a | 2 km |
| D174 | Talija (294th km of D067) — Bogʻiafzal — Yangiobod — Boltaboy (80V040/80V041); 40.55811, 64.08181 | 4R221 | 62 km |
| D175 | 73rd km of D198 — 259th km of A380 — D178a — Varaxsha historic site — D182 — D183 — Moxonkoʻl Canal — D183a — Qorakoʻl (331st km of M37) | 4R75 | 86 km |
| D176 | Galaosiyo (M37) — Romitan (D067/D193) — 258th km of A380 | 4R68 | 30 km |
| D177 | Buxoro Centre — 6th km of 80V001 — 4К153 — Navmetan — Yuqori Chukat — Kogon (A380) | 4K153 | 36 km |
| D178 | Buxoro (272nd km of M37/80V001) — Dalmun (D178) — Qizbibi historic site — D178a — Qumrabot — 248th km of A380 | 4R72 | 47 km |
| D178a | 31st km of D178 — North of Varaxsha historic site (D175) | 4R72a | 8 km |
| D179 | 431st km of A380 — Qizilravot/Amu Darya; 40.55181, 62.19445 | 4R73 | 31 km |
| D180 | 333rd km of A380 — Uchqir Gas Processing Plant; 40.17471, 62.92654 | 4R74 | 37 km |
| D181 | 281st km of A380 — Qoraqir National Park — Churuq — Jonkeldi (D195) | 4R218 | 105 km |
| D182 | Jondor (D067/D067b) — Aleli — Yuroqi Obod — 41st km of D175 | 4R224 | 14 km |
| D183 | 374th km of D067 — Moxonkoʻl — D183a — 60th km of D175 | 4R225 | 24 km |
| D183a | 11th km of D183 — D183b — 68th km of D175 | 4R225b | 6 km |
| D183b | 5th km of D183a — Yangimozor (317th km of M37) (supposed to connect to the 13th km of D183) | 4R225a | 9 km |
| D184 | Qorakoʻl Railway Station (M37/D076y/D187a) — Quyi Yangibozor (D185) — Quvacha — Jigʻachi — Amu-Qorakoʻl Canal | 4R225a | 29 km |
| D185 | Qorakoʻl (D186) — Tashabbus — Quyi Yangibozor (D184) — Xoʻjadavlat Railway Station (D076oʻ) | 4R77 | 37 km |
| D186 | 326th km of M36 — Qorakoʻl (D076y/D185) — Bandboshi Qandim Gas Processing Plant | 4R226/4K198 | 49 km |
| D187 | Olot, Uzbekistan (D076z) — D187a — Hamza-1 Pumping Station — Hamza-2 Pumping Station; 39.30238, 64.06311 | 4R78 | 37 km |
| D187a | Jumabozor (7th km of D187) — Qorakoʻl Railway Station (M37/D184) | 4R78a | 13 km |
| D188 | Buxoro (220th km of A380/D188a) — D188b — Buxoro Poultry Factory — 80V001 — D197 — Siyozpoyon — D189 — Southern shore of Toʻdakoʻl Reservoir — D200 — Chaydaroz — D200 — D071 — Navoiy (D190) | 4R69 | 5 km |
| D188a | 0st km of D188 (A380) — Buxoro Centre; Oqmasjid koʻchasi | | 1 km |
| D188b | 3rd km of D188 — Bukhara International Airport (D154f) | 4R69a | 5 km |
| D189 | Kogon (A380) — D188 — Quyimozor Reservoir — D197b —Qiziltepa (M37/D076m/D197/D200) — D199 — Uzilishkent/Toshrabot (D193) — Arabsaroy — Davriqo‘rg‘on/Yangiqo‘rg‘on (A379) | 4R63 | 97 km |
| D190 | Eastern, Southern, and Western Bypass of Navoiy; 150th km of M37 — Narpay — Navoiy Railway Station — D190 — Navoiy Azot AJ — Navoiy Power Station (162nd km of M37); Branch: 16th km of D190 — Navoiy Electrochemical Factory | 4R64g | 34 km |
| D191 | Qizilqum Ring Road; Karmana (3rd km of A379) — Qalqonota (D067/D207) — Dehibaland (D209) — Nurota (D074) — Dehibaland (209) — D048 — Qoʻshquduq (D196) — Boymurot (D208) — Oʻtamurot — Tomdibuloq — D191a — 214th km of A379 — Qizilquduq Railway Station | 4R57 | 463 km |
| D191a | 436th km of D191 — Zarafshon (204th km of A379/D192e) | 4R57a | 14 km |
| D192a | 22nd km of A379 — Konimex Centre (D067) — 26th km of A379 | 4R59b | 3 km |
| D192b | 31st km of A379 — Western Bypass for Konimex (Towards Konimex Railway Station) (D067) | 4R59a | 7 km |
| D192d | 180th km of A379 — Muruntov | 4R59d | 20 km |
| D192e | 200th km of A379 — Zarafshon Centre — 204th km of A379/D191a | 4R59g | 4 km |
| D193 | Uzilishkent/Toshrabot (D189) — Gʻamxoʻr — Gʻishti — Gʻijduvon (M37/D067/D076n/D172) — Kumushkent (D198) — Ko‘lxatib — Hovuzduvan/South of Vobkent (M37) — Niogan — Romitan (D176; Ko‘lxatib: 39.98783, 64.61173; Niogan: 39.97317, 64.43208 | 4K160/4K387 | 72 km |
| D194 | Uchquduq (A397/D202) — Kokpatas — Oqbaytal — Koʻkayoz — Kazakh international border (The connection to Kazakhstan is an undeveloped dirt track) | 4R60 | 198 km |
| D195 | Do‘ngalak/Preke — Oyoqquduq — 124th km of A379 — Bolaqaroq (D201) — D203 — Jonkeldi (D181) — Svetushiy (367th km of A380) | 4R61 | 278 km |
| D196 | 46th km of A379 — O‘rozjon (D209) — Teriqquduq — Yangi Gʻozgʻon — Qoʻshquduq (D191) | 4R62 | 96 km |
| D197 | Qiziltepa (49th km of D189) — Zarmitan/Azizobod (D198) — D188 — Kogon (208th km of A380/D154e) | 4R65 | 46 km |
| D197a | 3rd km of D197 — Boʻston (M37/D199) | | 3 km |
| D197b | 24th km of D197 — Quyimozor Railway Station — D189 | 4R65a | 3 km |
| D198 | Zarmitan/Azizobod (D197) — Kumushkent (D193) — Vobkent (237th km of M37/D173a) — Yangibozor (D067) — Aliyor — Mahallai-Mirishkor — Xoʻja Porso — D175 — 274th km of A380 | 4R66 | 75 km |
| D199 | Malik Railway Station — 182nd km of M37 — Hazora — South of Uzilishkent (D189) — Boʻston (M37/D197a) | 4R183 | 45 km |
| D200 | Qiziltepa (D189) — Yangihayot — D188 — Xuroson — D188 — Southestern shore of Toʻdakoʻl Reservoir; Yangihayot: 39.92730, 65.01810; Xuroson: 39.78080, 65.21570 | 4R208 | 85 km |

=== D201 to D240 ===
| Road | Direction | Former Equivalent | Length |
|---|---|---|---|
| D201 | East of Zarafshon (192nd km of A379) — Dovg‘iztov — Bolaqaroq (121st km of D195) | 4R209 | 64 km |
| D202 | Uchquduq (A397/D194) — Mingbuloq — Sarkesh — Chuqurqoq — Baliqboy (95V151) — Berdixan (38th km of D237) | 4R180 | 340 km |
| D203 | Shalxar/Uchquduq Railway Station (A379) — Sokin (D205) — Uzunquduq — 208th km of D195 | 4R210 | 164 km |
| D204 | Uchquduq (D202) — Ko‘lquduq — Orazali — Oqbigʻot; 43.15802, 62.91966 | 4R211 | 121 km |
| D205 | Sokin (52nd km of D203) — Bo‘zovboy; 41.75342, 62.45895 | 4R212 | 70 km |
| D206 | 140th km of A379 — Jeroy Phosphorite Deposit — 85V013; 41.58562, 64.82912 | 4R229 | 49 km |
| D207 | 10th km of A379 — Beshrabot (D067) — Qalqonota (D067/8th km of D191) | 4R230 | 19 km |
| D208 | 162nd km of D191 — Boymurot — Qoʻshquduq — Darvoza — Kandiboy — Chordara Dam Reservoir — Kazakh international border ( KX-8 ) no paved access between Qoʻshquduq and Darvoza | 4R270 | 180 km |
| D209 | Dehibaland (44th km of D191) — Gʻozgʻon — O‘rozjon (36th km of D196) | 4R232 | 27 km |
| D210 | Yangirabod (124th km of D067/D075) — Qozoqli — Bogʻchakalon (D067) | 4R231 | 23 km |
| D211 | Yangirabod (D067a/4th km of D075a/D075) — Qovoq — Tasmachi — Mirdosh (D212) | 4R269 | 29 km |
| D212 | Suvlik — Soykechar — Poponoy — D074 — Tikonli — Mirdosh (D211) (Portions of the roadway have been seriously damaged in 2021); Tikonli: 40.34117, 66.19272 | 4R271 | 60 km |
| D213 | Urganch (D215/D219/D229) — Xonqa (D213a/D221/D225/D229) — Bogʻot (D220) — Hazorasp (D213b/D213d/D228) — D213e — Amu Darya — 553rd km of A380 | 4R156 | 84 km |
| D213a | 11th km of D213 — Xonqa Centre/Railway Station (D225) | 4R156a | 3 km |
| D213b | 51st km of D213 — Hazorasp Centre/Railway Station | 4R156b | 2 km |
| D213d | Hazorasp (53rd km of D213/D225) — Amu Darya Southern Bank/Pier across from Toʻrtkoʻl | 4R156v | 11 km |
| D213e | Juvorxos (68th km of D213) — Pitnak — Turkmen international border (towards Gazojak, P35 ) | 4R156g | 15 km |
| D213f | 5th km of D213e — Pitnak Centre | 4R156d | 4 km |
| D214 | Urganch (D216/D219) — Bozorxo‘ja (D214a) — Yangiariq (D220/D221) | 4R157 | 22 km |
| D214a | Bozorxo‘ja (10th km of D214) — Usto Xo‘jamat (D220) | 4R157a | 15 km |
| D215 | Urganch (D213/D219) — D222 — Xiva (D220/D226/D227/D227a) | 4R158 | 29 km |
| D216 | Urganch (D213/D214/D216a/D219) — D226 — Shovot (D220) — Turkmen international border (towards Dashoguz, P159 ) | 4R159 | 56 km |
| D216a | Urganch (3rd km of D216) — Navroʻz (D217) | 4R159a | 3 km |
| D217 | Urganch (D216a/D219) — Yangibozor (D223/D226) — Gurlan (D220/D224) — D217a — Mangʻit (D238) — Turkmen international border (towards Gubadag, P160 ) | 4R160 | 82 km |
| D217a | 64th km of D217 — Jumurtov — Bank of Amu Darya | 4R160a | 9 km |
| D218 | Urganch (D219) — Cholish — Beruniy (A380/D154k) — Bo‘ston (D239) | 4R161 | 43 km |
| D219 | Urganch Ring Road; D217 — Northern Urganch/Urganch International Airport (D219a) — D218 — D213 — D229 — Southern Urganch (D214) — D215 — D216 | 4R162 | 22 km |
| D219a | 14th km of D219 — Urganch International Airport | 4R162a | 3 km |
| D220 | Bogʻot (D213) — Yangiariq (D214/D221) — Xiva (D215/D227/D227a) — Qoʻshkoʻpir (D222) — Shovot (D216) — D226 — Gurlan (38th km of D217) | 4R163 | 93 km |
| D221 | Xonqa (D213/D229) — Yangiariq (D214/D220) — Chiqirchi — Xiva (D227/D227a) | 4R164 | 42 km |
| D222 | 9th km of D215 — Qoromon (D226) — Qoʻshkoʻpir (D220) — Gʻozovot — Turkmen international border (towards Görogly, P165 ) | 4R165 | 35 km |
| D223 | Yangibozor (21st km of D217) — D220 — Turkmen international border (No cross-border connection) | 4R168 | 35 km |
| D224 | Gurlan (40th km of D217) — Guliston — Yangiobod — Turkmen international border (Towards Shabat, Connecting road has been cut off) | 4R169 | 25 km |
| D225 | Xonqa (D213/D213a) — Bogʻiyor — Hazorasp (53rd km of D213/D213d) | 4R170 | 36 km |
| D226 | Xiva (D215/ D220/D226/D227/D227a) — Qoromon (D222) — D216 — Yangibozor (19th km of D217) | 4R264 | 37km |
| D227 | North of Xiva (24th km of D215) — Xiva (D220/D221/D227a) — Xiva Gas Compressor Station; 41.33111, 60.34240 | 4R265 | 9 km |
| D227a | Xiva Ring Road; South, West, and North of the old City; 5th km of D227 (D221) — 90V065 — D220 — D226 — D215 | 4R265a | 9 km |
| D228 | Hazorasp (49th km of D213) — Achak — Turkmen international border | 4R266 | 9 km |
| D229 | Urganch (D219) — Chandir Qiyot — Xonqa (D213/D221) | 4R267 | 14 km |
| D230 | 484th km of A380 — Tuproqqalʼa — Qizilqum Nature Reserve | 4R268 | 37 km |
| D231 | 878th km of A380 — Qoʻngʻirot (D231a) — Oltinkoʻl (D231b) — Moʻynoq | 4R173 | 98 km |
| D231a | 873rd km of A380 — D231b — Qoʻngʻirot (2nd km of D231) | | 5 km |
| D231b | Qoʻngʻirot City Bypass Road; Oltinkoʻl (11th km of D231) — Qoʻngʻirot (D231a) — 876th km of A380 | 4R173 | 10 km |
| D232 | Nuku Centre (D234) — D233/95V001 — Xoʻjayli Centre (D154m) | 4R174 | 14 km |
| D232a | Nukus City: 95V001/Xoʻjayli koʻchasi — 2nd km of D233; Bilimlilar koʻchasi | 4R174a | 2 km |
| D233 | Nukus (D232/95V001/Oqmangʻit koʻchasi) — D232a — Oqmangʻit — Kegeyli (D236) — Chimboy (D233a) — Qozoqdaryo (95V124) | 4R175 | 122 km |
| D233a | Chimboy City: 66th km of D233 — 61st km of D234 | 4R175a | 2 km |
| D234 | Nukus (via Ernazar Alakoʻz koʻchasi)(A380/D232/D234a/D234b/D234d/D234e/95V001) — Xalqobod (D236/D237) — Chimboy (D233a) — Qoraoʻzak (D237) — Taxtakoʻpir | 4R176 | 116 km |
| D234a | Nukus Eastern Bypass Road; 15th km of D234 — A380/D234 | 4R176v | 12 km |
| D234b | Nukus City: 12th km of D234 — Qattaogʻar (7th km of D233) | 4R176g | 2 km |
| D234d | Nukus City: 12th km of D234 — D234e — D240 — 95V001 — Nukus Railway Station (95V001); Allayor Do‘stnazarov ko‘chasi | 4R176a | 10 km |
| D234e | Nukus City: 7th km of D234 — 3.5th km of D234d (Access to Nukus International Airport); Chimboy ko‘chasi | 4R176b | 2 km |
| D235 | Qonlikoʻl (852nd km of A380) — Shumanoy — Qorabayli/Shumanoy Railway Station (819th km of A380) | 4R177 | 66 km |
| D236 | Xalqobod (D234) — Kegeyli (D233) — Qozonketkan | 4R178 | 60 km |
| D237 | Qoraoʻzak (D234) — Berdixan (D202) — Xalqobod (D234) | 4R179 | 49 km |
| D238 | 717th km of A380 — Qipchoq — Mangʻit (D217) — Qilichboy — Turkmen international border (towards Dashoguz) | 4R181 | 36 km |
| D239 | 661st km of A380 — Qizilqalʼa — Boʻston (D218) — Guldursun — Toʻrtkoʻl (D154j) | 4R182 | 66 km |
| D240 | Nukus City: G‘arezsizlik Plaza (D232) — Islom Karimov (Xalqlar doʻstligi) koʻchasi — Ota yo‘li ko‘chasi — Nukus International Airport (D234d); G‘arezsizlik: 42.459722, 59.619116 | 4R190 | 3 km |

== Local highways ==
The total length of these roads is 24,222 km.

For these types of roads, their codes consist of 3 digits, and they're designated with a prefix "##V" (a two digit number designating the region, same codes as those for Uzbek license plates, followed by "V" for viloyat). For example "70V001" is located in Qashqadaryo Region, and designates Qashqadaryo Ring Road. (license plates of Qashqadaryo Region have codes 70 to 74). Branches and variants are also labelled using minuscule Latin letters, e.g. "70V078a" (3rd km of D148 — Shahrisabz).

== Maps and external sources ==
- List of Roads of national importance of the Soviet Union from 1982 (in Russian) Link (Archive)
- Map of Jizzax Region's numbered highways Link (Archive)
- Map of Navoiy Region's numbered highways Link (Archive)
- Map of Qashqadaryo Region's numbered highways Link (Archive)
- Map of Qaraqalpaqstan Region's numbered highways link (Archive)

== See also ==
- Roads in Armenia
- Roads in Azerbaijan
- Roads in Georgia (country)
- Roads in Kazakhstan
- Roads in Kyrgyzstan
- Roads in Tajikistan
