= Yangikurgan =

Yangikurgan can mean one of the following localities:

- Yangiqoʻrgʻon, an urban-type settlement in Namangan Region, Uzbekistan
- Yangiqoʻrgʻon District, Namangan Region, Uzbekistan
- Ibrat, formerly Yangiqoʻrgʻon, a village in Fergana Region, Uzbekistan
- Yangiqurghon, Tajikistan, a town in Tajikistan
