= Baliqchi (disambiguation) =

Baliqchi may refer to:

- Baliqchi
- Baliqchi, Iran
- Baliqchi, Uzbekistan
- Baliqchi District, Uzbekistan
- Balykchy, a city in Kyrgyzstan
