= Ishtixon District =

Coordinates: 39°57′59″N 66°29′10″E

- District
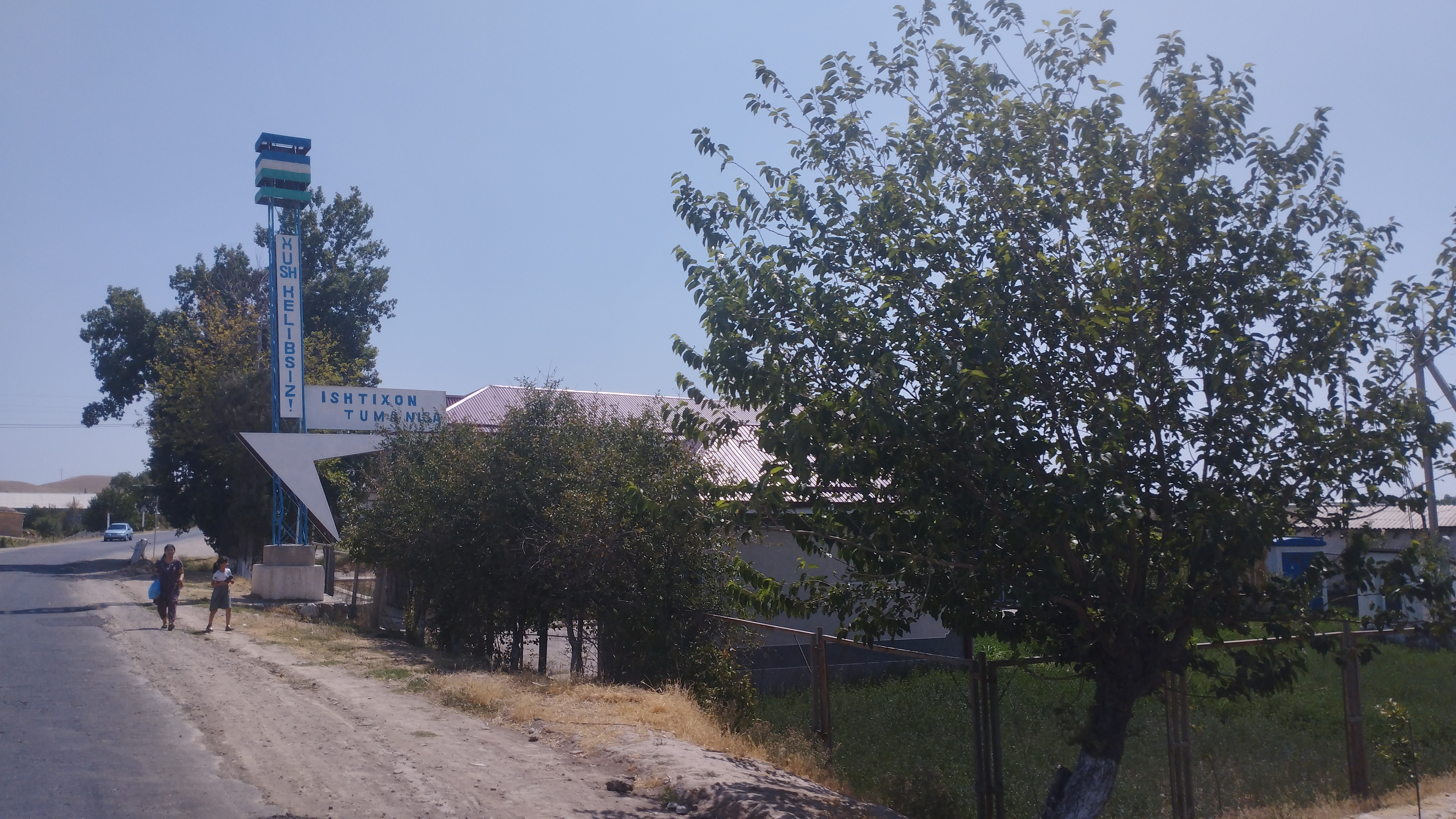

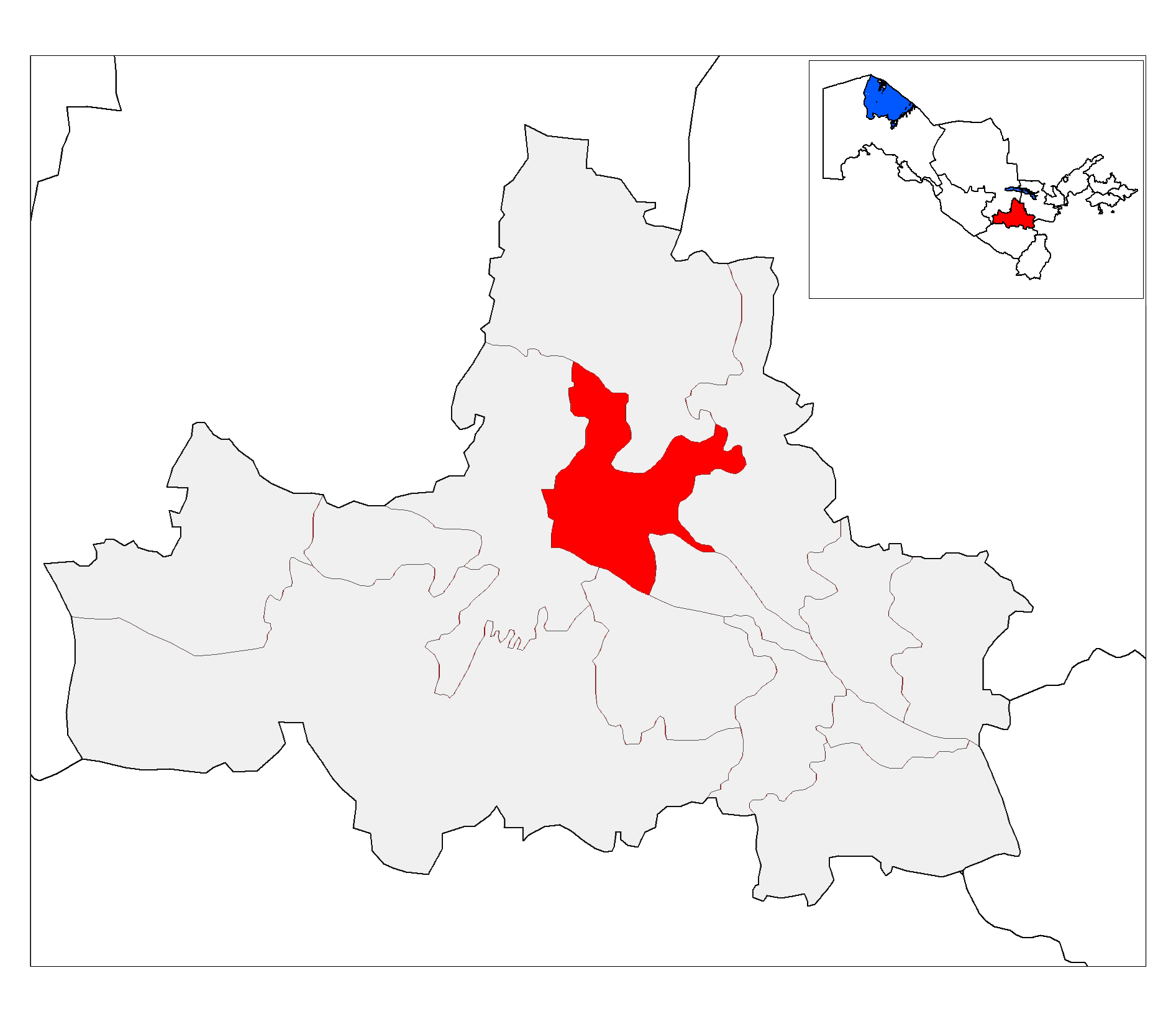
- Country: Uzbekistan
- Region: Samarqand Region
- Capital: Ishtixon

Area
  - Total: 720 km^{2} (280 sq mi)

Population (2021)
  - Total: 258,200
  - Density: 360/km^{2} (930/sq mi)
- Time zone: UTC+5 (UZT)

Ishtixon District is a district of Samarqand Region in Uzbekistan. The capital is at the city Ishtixon. It has an area of 720 km^{2} (280 sq mi) and its population is 258,200 (2021 est.).

The district consists of one city (Ishtixon), 12 urban-type settlements (Mitan, Azamat, Damariq, Bahrin, Qirqyigit, Odil, Sugʻot, Xalqobod, Shayxislom, Sheyxlar, Yangikent, Yangirabot) and 9 rural communities.
