= Toʻraqoʻrgʻon District =

Coordinates: 41.0000°N 71.5158°E

Toʻraqoʻrgʻon
- District
- Toʻraqoʻrgʻon tumani
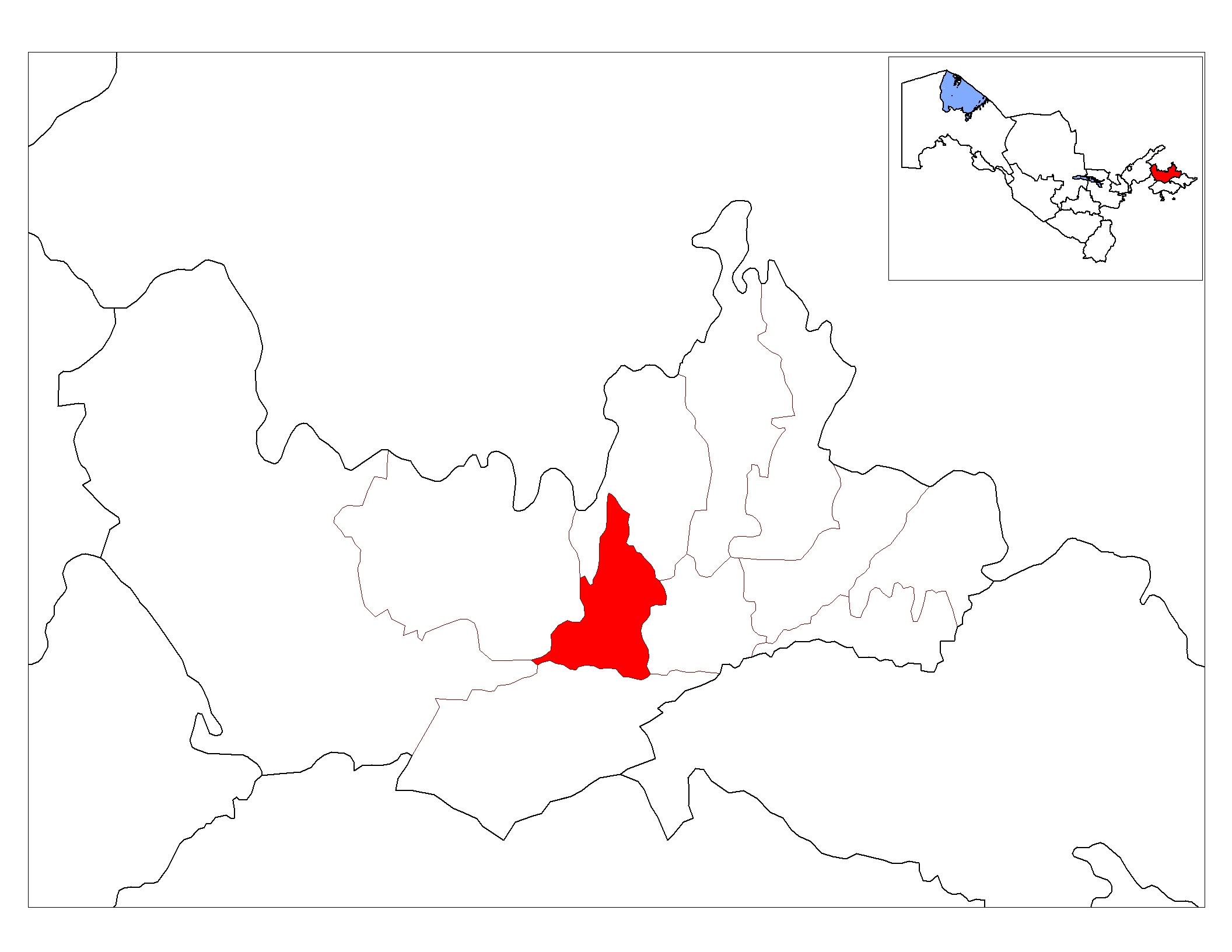
- Country: Uzbekistan
- Region: Namangan Region
- Capital: Toʻraqoʻrgʻon
- Established: 1936

Area
  - Total: 273 km^{2} (105 sq mi)

Population (2021)
  - Total: 228,000
  - Density: 835/km^{2} (2,160/sq mi)
- Time zone: UTC+5 (UZT)

Toʻraqoʻrgʻon is a district of Namangan Region in Uzbekistan. The capital lies at the city Toʻraqoʻrgʻon. Its area is 273 km^{2}. Its population is 228,000 (2021 est.).

The district consists of one city (Toʻraqoʻrgʻon), 13 urban-type settlements (Oqtosh, Yettikon, Yandama, Axsi, Kalvak, Mozorkoʻxna, Buramatut, Shaxand, Olchin, Saroy, Katagon, Kichikqurama, Namdon) and 8 rural communities.
