= Xatirchi District =

Coordinates: 40°02′24″N 65°57′36″E

khatirchi District
- District
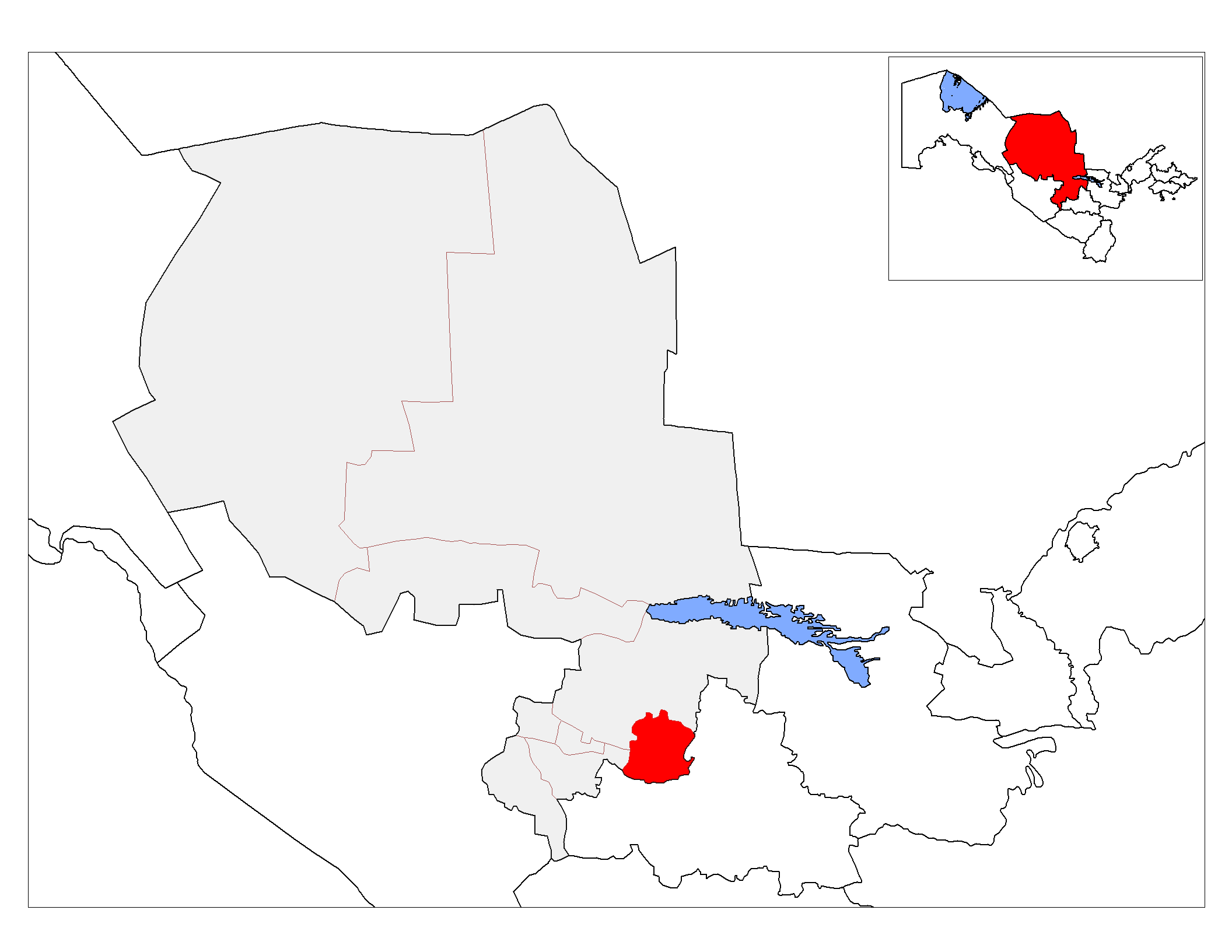
- Country: Uzbekistan
- Region: Navoiy Region
- Capital: Yangirabod

Area
  - Total: 1,420 km^{2} (550 sq mi)

Population (2021)
  - Total: 201,900
  - Density: 142/km^{2} (368/sq mi)
- Time zone: UTC+5 (UZT)

Xatirchi District (Uzbek: Xatirchi tumani) is a district of Navoiy Region in Uzbekistan. The capital lies at the city Yangirabod. It has an area of 1,420 km^{2} (550 sq mi) and its population is 201,900 (2021 est.).

The district consists of one city (Yangirabod), 11 urban-type settlements (Langar, Jaloyir, Qoʻshchinor, Polvontepa, Qoʻrgʻon, Tasmachi, Bogʻishamol, Gʻalabek, Paxtakor, Turkman, Yangi qurilish) and 9 rural communities (Sahovat, Olchinobod, Oʻzbekiston, Bogʻchakalon, Xonaqa, Qoracha, Pulkan shoir, Yangirabod, Koʻksaroy).
