= Fergana District =

Coordinates: 40.1706°N 71.7287°E

Fergana
- District
- Fargʻona tumani
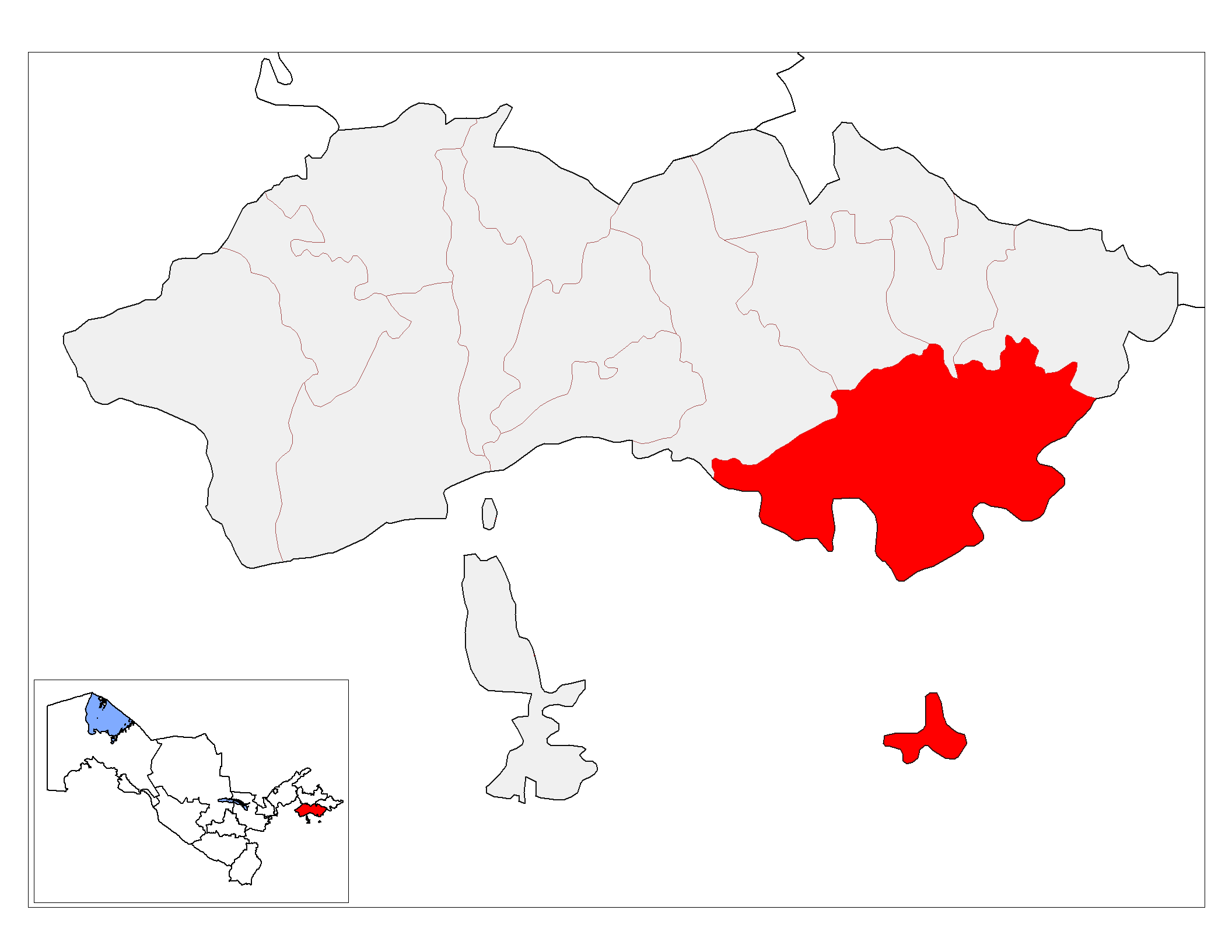
- Country: Uzbekistan
- Region: Fergana Region
- Capital: Chimyon
- Established: 1926

Area
  - Total: 610 km^{2} (240 sq mi)

Population (2022)
  - Total: 220,900
  - Density: 360/km^{2} (940/sq mi)
- Time zone: UTC+5 (UZT)

Fergana is a district of Fergana Region in Uzbekistan. The capital lies at the town Chimyon. It has an area of 610 km^{2} (240 sq mi) and it had 220,900 inhabitants in 2022.

The district consists of 21 urban-type settlements (Chimyon, Avval, Archa, Vodil, Yuqori Vodil, Damkoʻl, Yoshlarobod, Qoʻrgʻontepa, Langar, Logʻon, Mindon, Novkent, Yuqori Oqtepa, Parvoz, Yuqori Soyboʻyi, Bahor, Xonqiz, Xoʻroba, Neftchilar, Shoximardonobod, Yuqori Mindon) and 16 rural communities (Avval, Gulshan, Qoʻrgʻontepa, Soy boʻyi, Logʻon, Mindon, Navkat, Qaptarxona, Shohimardon, Parvoz, Chimyon, Damkoʻl, Xonqiz, Oqbilol, Yuqori Vodil, Vodil).
