= Jalaquduq District =

Coordinates: 40.7167°N 72.3833°E

Jalaquduq
- District
- Jalaquduq tumani
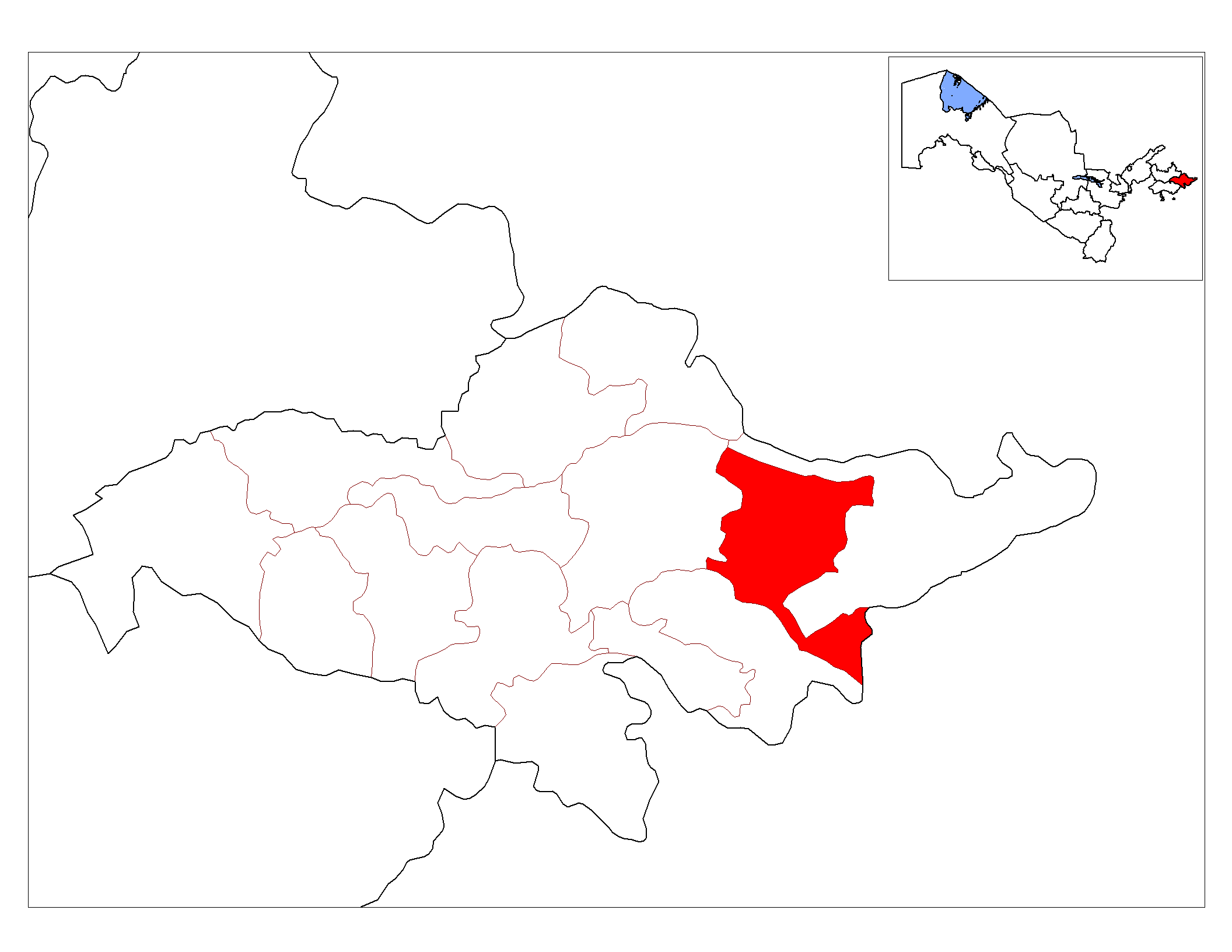
- Country: Uzbekistan
- Region: Andijan Region
- Capital: Jalaquduq
- Established: 1926

Area
  - Total: 370 km^{2} (140 sq mi)

Population (2022)
  - Total: 191,400
  - Density: 520/km^{2} (1,300/sq mi)
- Time zone: UTC+5 (UZT)

Jalaquduq District (Uzbek: Jalaquduq tumani) is a district of Andijan Region in Uzbekistan. The capital lies at the city Jalaquduq. It has an area of 370 km^{2} (140 sq mi) and it had 191,400 inhabitants in 2022.

The district consists of 1 city (Jalaquduq), 7 urban-type settlements (Janubiy Olamushuk, Beshtol, Yorqishloq, Jalaquduq, Ko'kalam, Qo'shtepa and Oyim) and 8 rural communities.
