= Paxtaobod District =

Coordinates: 40.73°N 72.77°E

- District
- Paxtaobod tumani
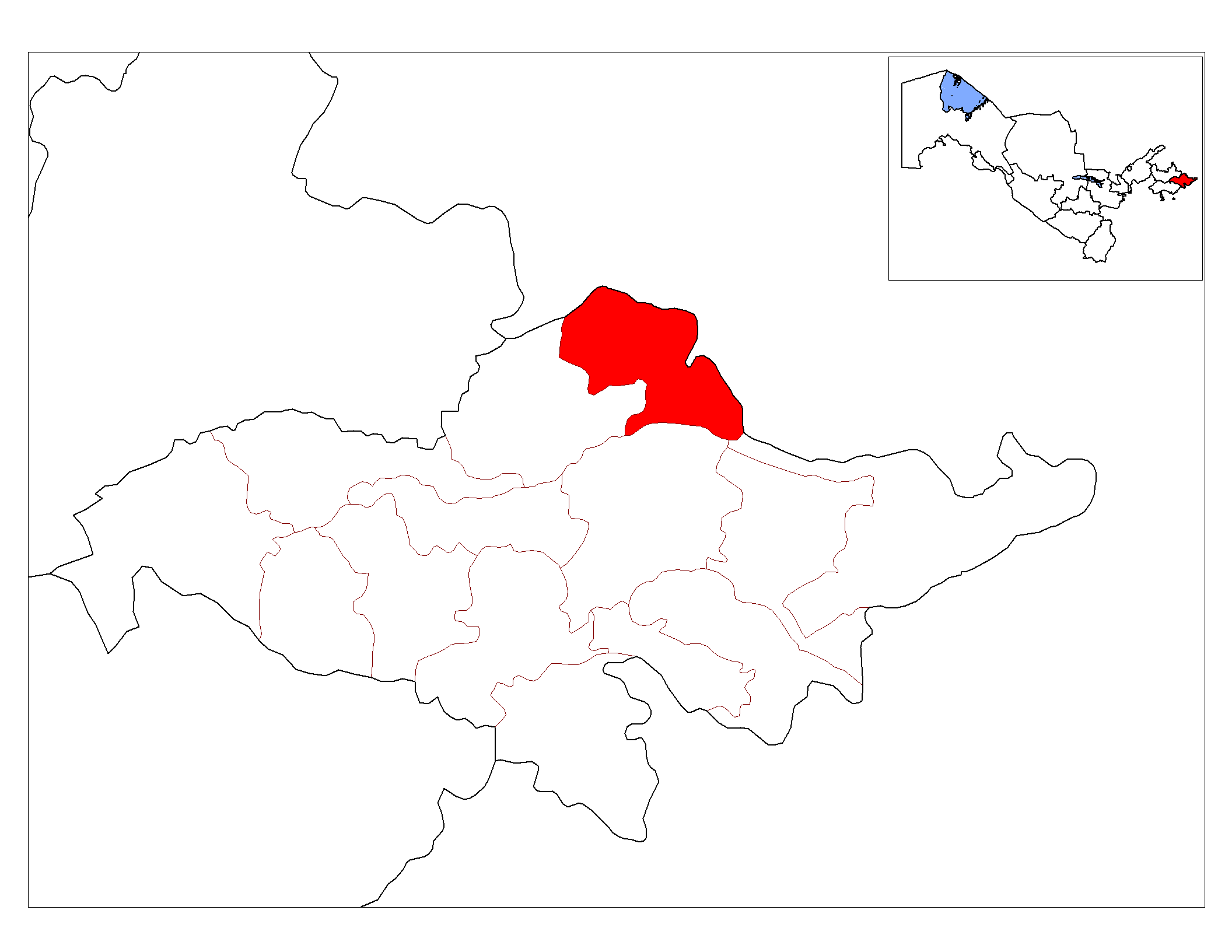
- Country: Uzbekistan
- Region: Andijan Region
- Capital: Pakhtaabad
- Established: 1926

Area
  - Total: 260 km^{2} (100 sq mi)

Population (2022)
  - Total: 199,900
  - Density: 770/km^{2} (2,000/sq mi)
- Time zone: UTC+5 (UZT)

Paxtaobod District (Uzbek: Paxtaobod tumani) is a district of Andijan Region in Uzbekistan. It is bordered with Jalal-Abad Region of Kyrgyzstan. The capital lies at the city Paxtaobod. It has an area of 260 km^{2} (100 sq mi) and it had 199,900 inhabitants in 2022.

The district consists of 1 city (Paxtaobod), 3 urban-type settlements (Do'stlik, Izboskan and Pushmon) and 4 rural communities.

The district formerly named as Qo'qonqishloq prior and during the Soviet. It is believed that people living in the region once came from Qo'qon (Kokand) so it is named as Qo'qonqishloq which directly translates as "the village of Kokan people".
