= Yuqorichirchiq District =

Coordinates: 41.3201°N 69.5314°E

Yuqorichirchiq
- District
- Yuqorichirchiq tumani
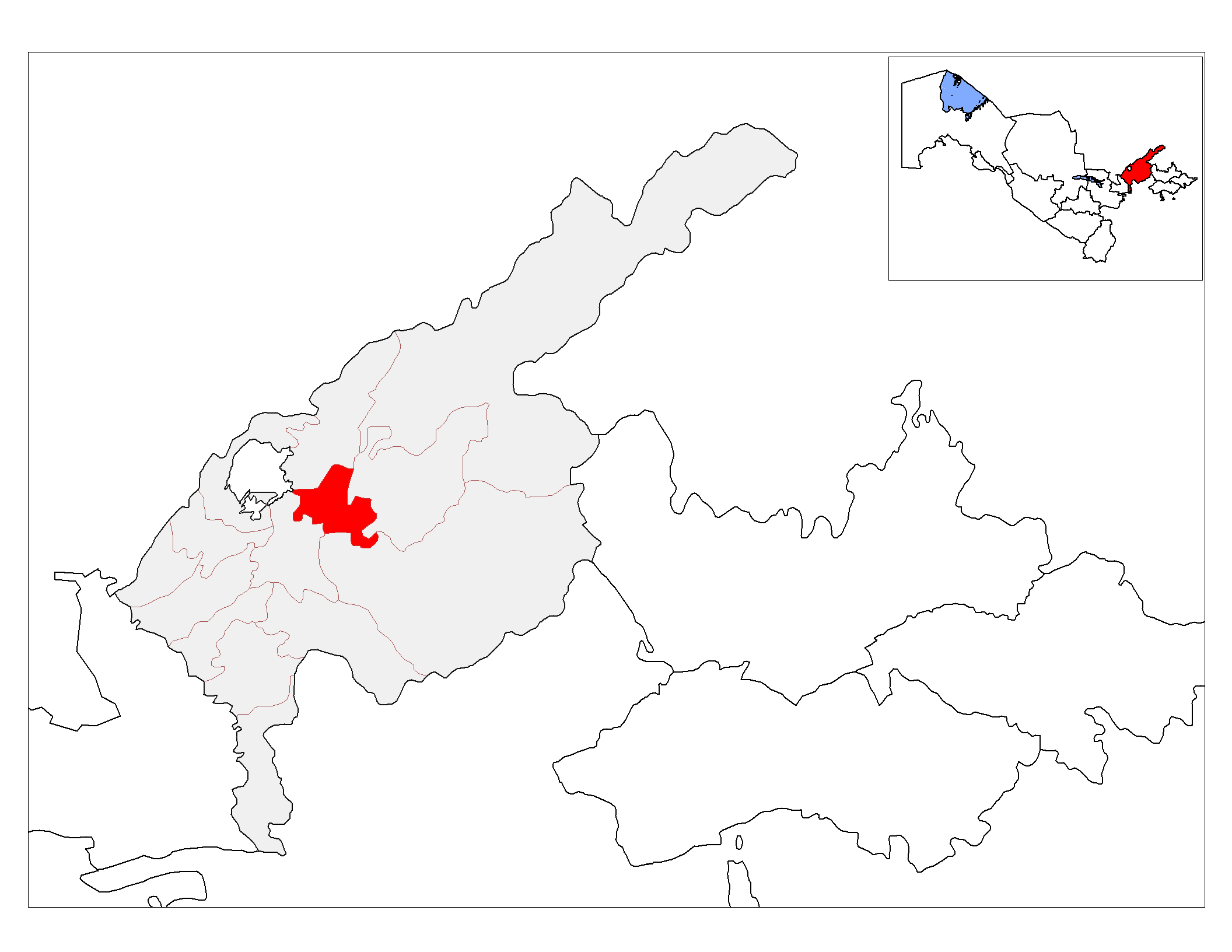
- Country: Uzbekistan
- Region: Tashkent Region
- Capital: Yangibozor
- Established: 1926

Area
  - Total: 440 km^{2} (170 sq mi)

Population (2021)
  - Total: 138,900
  - Density: 320/km^{2} (820/sq mi)
- Time zone: UTC+5 (UZT)

Yuqorichirchiq is a district of Tashkent Region in Uzbekistan. The capital lies at the town Yangibozor. It has an area of 440 km^{2} (170 sq mi) and it had 138,900 inhabitants in 2021. The district consists of 4 urban-type settlements (Yangibozor, Mirobod, Xitoy Tepa) and 9 rural communities (Oqovul, Arganchi, Bordonkoʻl, Jambul, Sakson ota, Navroʻz, Istiqlol, Surnkent, Tinchlik).
