= Zarmitan =

Zarmitan زرميتان
- Village
- Location within Iran
- Coordinates: 32°07′24″N 50°30′29″E
- Country: Iran
- Province: Chaharmahal and Bakhtiari
- County: Ardal
- Bakhsh: Central
- Rural District: Poshtkuh

Population (2006)
  - Total: 455
- Time zone: UTC+3:30 (IRST)
  - Summer (DST): UTC+4:30 (IRDT)

Zarmitan (Persian: زرميتان, also Romanized as Zarmītān; also known as Zarmītān-e Bālā) is a village in Poshtkuh Rural District, in the Central District of Ardal County, Chaharmahal and Bakhtiari Province, Iran. At the 2006 census, its population was 455, in 101 families. The village is populated by Lurs.
