= Oyim =

- urban-type settlement
- Location in Uzbekistan
- Coordinates: 40°49′27″N 72°44′29″E
- Country: Uzbekistan
- Region: Andijan Region
- District: Jalaquduq District
- Urban-type settlement status: 2009

Population (2016)
  - Total: 10,000
- Time zone: UTC+5 (UZT)

Oyim (Uzbek: Oyim/Ойим, Russian: Аим) is an urban-type settlement in Andijan Region, Uzbekistan. It is located in Jalaquduq District. Its population is 10,000 (2016).
