= Navbahor, Pop =

Navbahor
- urban-type settlement
- Location in Uzbekistan
- Coordinates: 40°43′43″N 71°04′49″E
- Country: Uzbekistan
- Region: Namangan Region
- District: Pop District
- Urban-type settlement: 1979

Population (1989)
  - Total: 1,202
- Time zone: UTC+5 (UZT)

Navbahor (Uzbek: Navbahor/Навбаҳор, Russian: Навбахор) is an urban-type settlement in Namangan Region, Uzbekistan. It is part of Pop District. The town population in 1989 was 1202 people.
