= Toʻraqoʻrgʻon =

Toʻraqoʻrgʻon Uzbek: Toʻraqoʻrgʻon/Тўрақўрғон
- City
- Location in Uzbekistan
- Coordinates: 41°00′00″N 71°30′57″E
- Country: Uzbekistan
- Region: Namangan Region
- District: Toʻraqoʻrgʻon District
- Town status: 1979

Population (2016)
  - Total: 30,300
- Time zone: UTC+5 (UZT)
- Postal code: 160707

Toʻraqoʻrgʻon (Uzbek: Toʻraqoʻrgʻon/Тўрақўрғон, Russian: Туракурган, romanized: Turakurgan) is a city in Namangan Region, Uzbekistan. It is the administrative center of Toʻraqoʻrgʻon District. The town population was 18,415 people in 1989, and 30,300 in 2016.
