= Yangi Margilan =

- urban-type settlement
- Location in Uzbekistan
- Coordinates: 40°25′52″N 71°43′06″E
- Country: Uzbekistan
- Region: Fergana Region
- City: Margilan
- Urban-type settlement status: 1947

Population (1989)
  - Total: 23,531
- Time zone: UTC+5 (UZT)

Yangi Margilan (Uzbek: Yangi Margʻilon/Янги Марғилон, Russian: Янги Маргилан) is an urban-type settlement in Fergana Region, Uzbekistan. Administratively, it is part of the city Margilan. The town population in 1989 was 23,531 people.
