= Langar, Navoiy Region =

Langar
- urban-type settlement
- Location in Uzbekistan
- Coordinates: 40°23′41″N 65°59′00″E
- Country: Uzbekistan
- Region: Navoiy Region
- District: Xatirchi District

Population (1989)
  - Total: 3,738
- Time zone: UTC+5 (UZT)

Langar (Uzbek: Langar/Лангар, Russian: Лянгар) is an urban-type settlement in Navoiy Region, Uzbekistan. It is part of Xatirchi District. The town population in 1989 was 3738 people.
