= Yangirabod =

- City
- Location in Uzbekistan
- Coordinates: 40°02′14″N 65°57′55″E
- Country: Uzbekistan
- Region: Navoiy Region
- District: Xatirchi District
- Town status: 1996

Population (2016)
  - Total: 17,000
- Time zone: UTC+5 (UZT)

Yangirabod or Yangirabot (Uzbek: Yangirabod, Янгирабод or Yangirabot, Янгиработ, Russian: Янгирабад, romanized: Yangirabad) is a city and seat of Xatirchi District in Navoiy Region in Uzbekistan. The town population in 1989 was 11,364 people, and 17,000 in 2016.
