= Ishtixon =

- City
- Location in Uzbekistan
- Coordinates: 39°57′59″N 66°29′10″E
- Country: Uzbekistan
- Region: Samarqand Region
- District: Ishtixon District

Government
  - hokim: Fazliddin Quronovich Ro‘ziyev

Population (2016)
  - Total: 16,000
- Time zone: UTC+5 (UZT)
- Website: http://ishtixon.uz

Ishtixon (Uzbek: Ishtixon/Иштихон,) is a city in Samarqand Region, Uzbekistan. It is the capital of Ishtixon District. In 1989, the population was 10,155 people, and 16,000 in 2016.
