= Baliqchi District =

District in Andijan Region, Uzbekistan

Coordinates: 40.9333°N 71.9000°E

Baliqchi
- District
- Baliqchi tumani
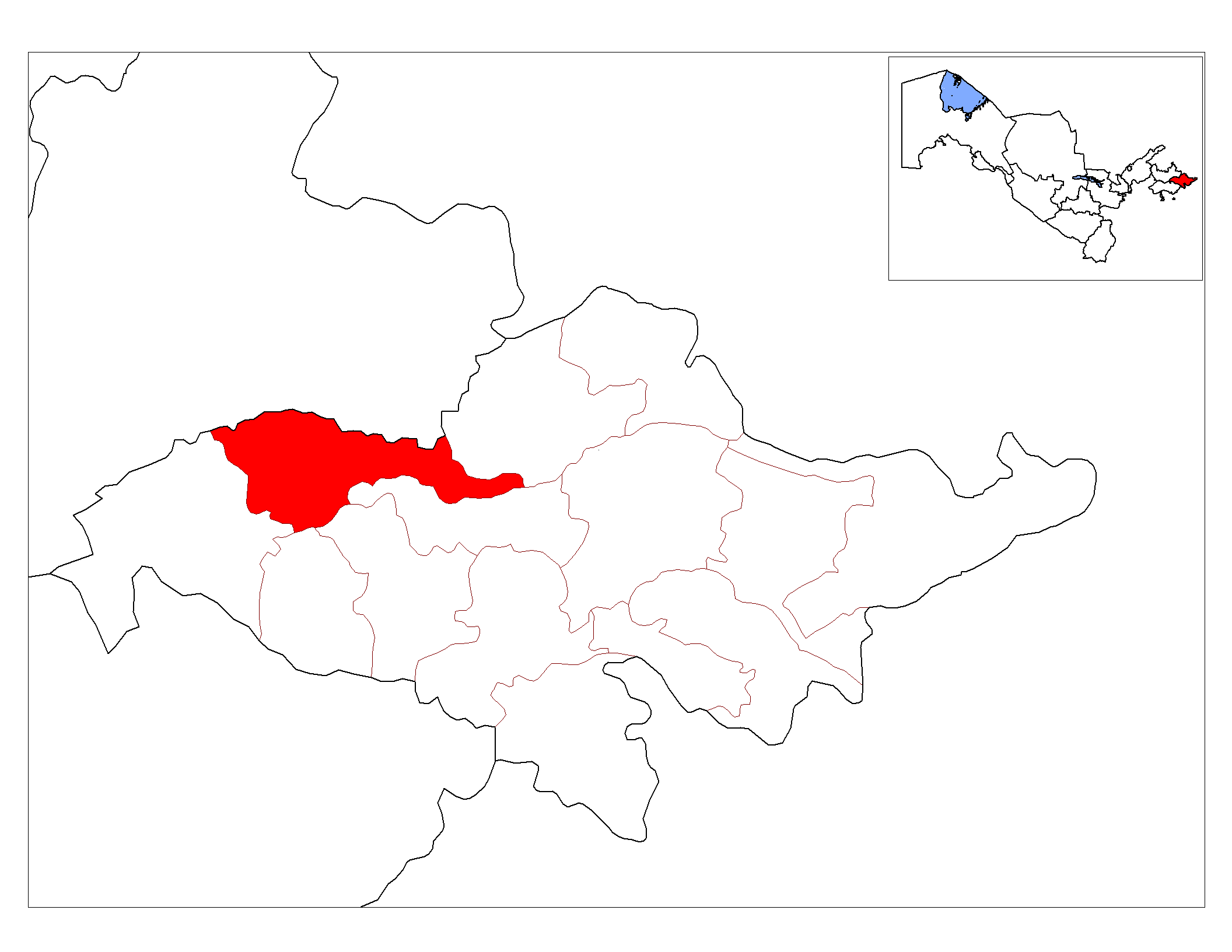
- Country: Uzbekistan
- Region: Andijan Region
- Capital: Baliqchi
- Established: 1926

Area
  - Total: 340 km^{2} (130 sq mi)

Population (2022)
  - Total: 207,100
  - Density: 610/km^{2} (1,600/sq mi)
- Time zone: UTC+5 (UZT)

Baliqchi is a district of Andijan Region in Uzbekistan. The capital lies at Baliqchi. It has an area of 340 km^{2} (130 sq mi) and it had 207,100 inhabitants in 2022.

== Subdivisions ==
The district includes three urban-type settlements (Baliqchi, Xoʻjaobod and Chinobod) and nine rural communities (for 60 villages):

- Baliqchi
- Olimbek
- Boʻston
- Guliston
- Oxunboboyev
- Siza
- Xoʻjaobod
- Eski Xaqqulobod
- Oʻrmonbek
