= Yangiqoʻrgʻon District =

Coordinates: 41.1922°N 71.7281°E

Yangiqoʻrgʻon
- District
- Yangiqoʻrgʻon tumani
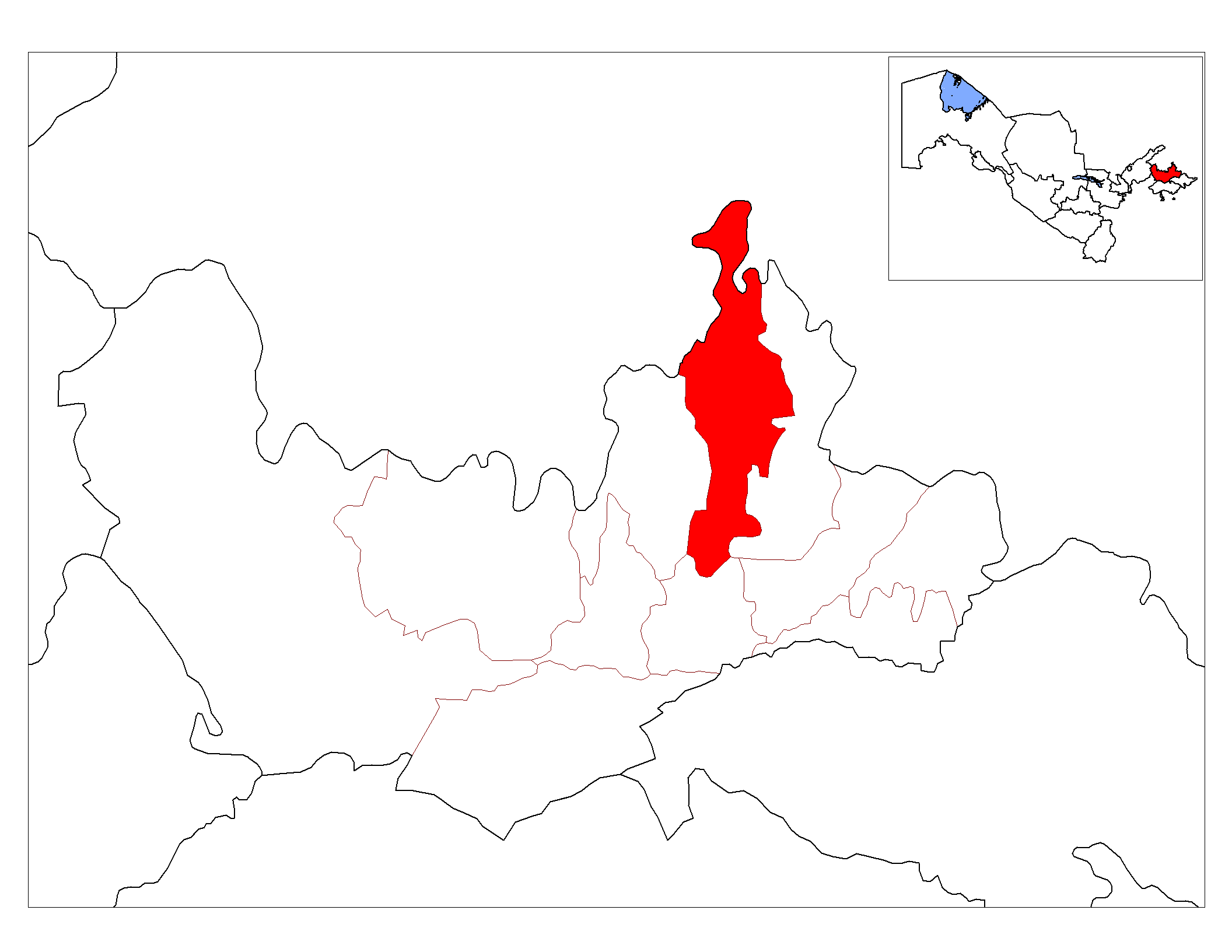
- Country: Uzbekistan
- Region: Namangan Region
- Capital: Yangikurgan
- Established: 1926

Area
  - Total: 525 km^{2} (203 sq mi)

Population (2021)
  - Total: 221,800
  - Density: 422/km^{2} (1,090/sq mi)
- Time zone: UTC+5 (UZT)

Yangiqoʻrgʻon is a district of Namangan Region in Uzbekistan. The capital is in the town Yangiqoʻrgʻon. Its area is 525 km^{2}. Its population is 221,800 (2021 est.).

The district consists of 19 urban-type settlements (Yangiqoʻrgʻon, Bekobod, Gʻovazon, Zarkent, Iskavot, Kalishoh, Qizil qiyoq, Qorayantoq, Qorapolvon, Qorachashoʻrkent, Koʻkyor, Navkent, Nanay, Poromon, Rovot, Sangiston, Salmon, Xoʻjashoʻrkent, Yumaloqtepa) and 11 rural communities.
