= Jalaquduq =

- City
- Location in Uzbekistan
- Coordinates: 40°43′10″N 72°38′34″E
- Country: Uzbekistan
- Region: Andijan Region
- District: Jalaquduq District
- Town status: 1976

Population (2016)
  - Total: 24,000
- Time zone: UTC+5 (UZT)

Jalaquduq (Uzbek: Jalaquduq, Жалақудуқ, Russian: Джалакудук; 1976–2015 Oxunboboev or Akhunbabayev, before 1976 Soʻfiqishloq or Sufi-Kishlak) is a city in Andijan Region, Uzbekistan. It is the administrative center of Jalaquduq District. Its population was 11,043 in 1989, and 24,000 in 2016.
