= Oqtosh, Namangan Region =

Oqtosh
- urban-type settlement
- Location in Uzbekistan
- Coordinates: 40°56′12″N 71°30′37″E
- Country: Uzbekistan
- Region: Namangan Region
- District: Toʻraqoʻrgʻon District
- Urban-type settlement status: 1974

Population (1989)
  - Total: 4,067
- Time zone: UTC+5 (UZT)

Oqtosh (Uzbek: Oqtosh/Оқтош, Russian: Акташ, romanized: Aktash) is an urban-type settlement in Namangan Region, Uzbekistan. It is part of Toʻraqoʻrgʻon District. The town population in 1989 was 4067 people.
