= Qashqadaryo (town) =

- urban-type settlement
- Location in Uzbekistan
- Coordinates: 38°55′37″N 65°45′15″E
- Country: Uzbekistan
- Region: Qashqadaryo Region
- City: Qarshi
- Urban-type settlement: 1978

Population (1989)
  - Total: 4,647
- Time zone: UTC+5 (UZT)

Qashqadaryo (Uzbek: [qaʃˌqadarˈjɔ]), also spelled Kashkadarya (Russian: Кашкадарья), is an urban-type settlement in Qashqadaryo Region, Uzbekistan. It is part of the city Qarshi. The population in 1989 was 4647 people.
