= Yangibozor, Tashkent Region =

Yangibozor
- urban-type settlement
- Location in Uzbekistan
- Coordinates: 41°18′54″N 69°31′31″E
- Country: Uzbekistan
- Region: Tashkent Region
- District: Yuqorichirchiq District

Population (1989)
  - Total: 8,360
- Time zone: UTC+5 (UZT)

Yangibozor (Uzbek: Yangibozor, Russian: Янгибазар, romanized: Yangibazar) is a town and seat of Yuqorichirchiq District in Tashkent Region in Uzbekistan.
