= Vodil =

Urban-type settlement in Fergana Region, Uzbekistan

- urban-type settlement
- Location in Uzbekistan
- Coordinates: 40°10′44″N 71°43′47″E
- Country: Uzbekistan
- Region: Fergana Region
- District: Fergana District

Population (2016)
  - Total: 16,200
- Time zone: UTC+5 (UZT)

Vodil (also spelled as Vuadil, Uzbek: Водил, Vodil, Russian: Вуадиль) is an urban-type settlement in Fergana Region, Uzbekistan. It is part of Fergana District. Its population was 17,551 people in 1989, and 16,200 in 2016.
