= Tudakul =

Reservoir near Bukhara

- Uzbek: Toʻdakoʻl suv ombori
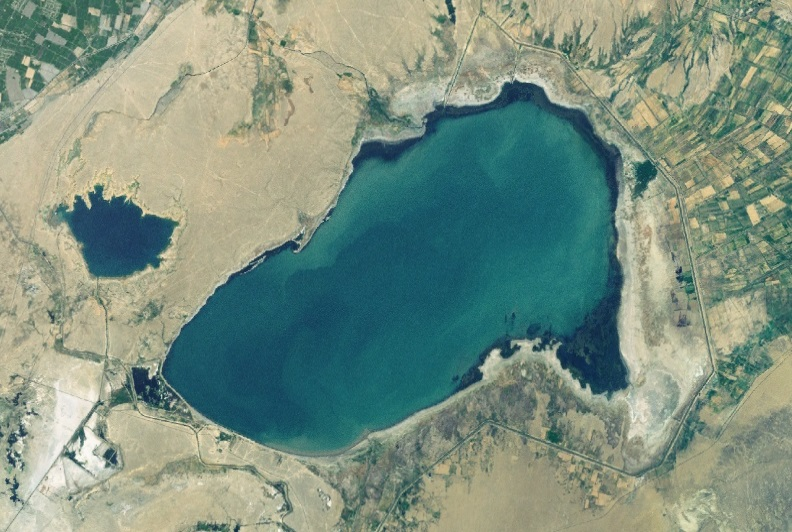
- Tudakul (larger) and Kuymazar reservoirs
- Interactive map of Tudakul
- Coordinates: 39°50′45″N 64°50′34″E
- Built: 1950s
- Surface area: 22,000 hectares (85 mi^{2})
- Average depth: 5–7 metres (16–23 ft)
- Max. depth: 17 metres (56 ft)
- Water volume: 1,000,000,000 cubic metres (3.5×10^{10} ft^{3})

Ramsar Wetland
- Official name: Tudakul and Kuymazar Water Reservoirs
- Designated: 19 August 2020
- Reference no.: 2433

Tudakul lake, Tudakul reservoir, or simply Tudakul (Uzbek: Toʻdakoʻl suv ombori) is located in the Qiziltepa district of Navoiy region. It was formed in 1952 due to the subsidence of the Zarafshan River waters into the Tudakul depression, naturally occurring as a result. Situated about 26 kilometers east of Bukhara in a natural depression, it's positioned in the eastern part of the Quyimozor Water Reservoir. This water basin was converted into a water reservoir in 1968.

The water in it is partly mineralized, resembling saline waters. It underwent reconstruction in 1977. Its total volume is 1.2 km^{3} (although some sources state a general volume of 0.8 km^{3}). The surface area of the water is 210 km^{2}, with an average depth of 4.8 meters. Its depth reaches 4 meters, and its maximum capacity is 46.0 m^{3}/s. Through the intermediate canal, it collects surplus waters of the Zarafshan River and is replenished from the Amu-Bukhara canal that links to the Amu Darya River. The Tudakul reservoir is a habitat for species listed in the Uzbekistan Red Book, including waterfowl, aquatic animals, large-scale fish, turtles, and gulls. In 1960, the Tudakul Fish Hatchery was established on an area of 30 thousand hectares within the reservoir's foundation. In 2020, a new resort, the "Silk Road Family Repost" touristic beach zone, was established on the shore of the Tudakul Quyimozor water reservoir. A few weeks after this event, the Tudakul Quyimozor reservoir was registered under the Ramsar Convention.

== Description ==
The Tudakul Water Reservoir is situated east of Bukhara, 26 kilometers away, nestled in a natural depression (at an elevation of 223.5 meters above sea level). To its west lies the Quyimozor Water Reservoir. It collects excess water from the Zarafshan River through an intermediate canal and is supplied water from the Amu-Bukhara canal connected to the Amu Darya River. Additional water is supplied to the lower part of the canal through supplementary channels. Through the discharge canal, it feeds water to the Quyimozor Water Reservoir. The water in the To'dakol Water Reservoir is partly mineralized.

The water reservoir was naturally formed in 1952 due to the seepage of Zarafshan River waters into the Tudakul depression. This water basin was developed into a water reservoir in 1968 and underwent reconstruction in 1977.

The surface area of the Tudakul Water Reservoir is 210 km^{2}, with a volume of 1.2 km^{3} (although other sources mention a general volume of 0.8 km^{3}). The reservoir has roughly a triangular shape with rounded corners. Its average depth (as of the beginning of the 21st century) is 4.8 meters, with a depth of 4 meters, and its maximum water release capacity is 46.0 m^{3}/s.

== Flora and fauna ==
The shoreline flora primarily consists of reeds and rush plants. Due to the significant depth and rapid heating of sunlight in summer, the Tudakul area boasts a variety of aquatic plants, microorganisms, and invertebrates. The reservoir is abundant with fish typical to the Central Asian region, especially carp, pike, tench, and catfish, as well as various types of perch and other species.

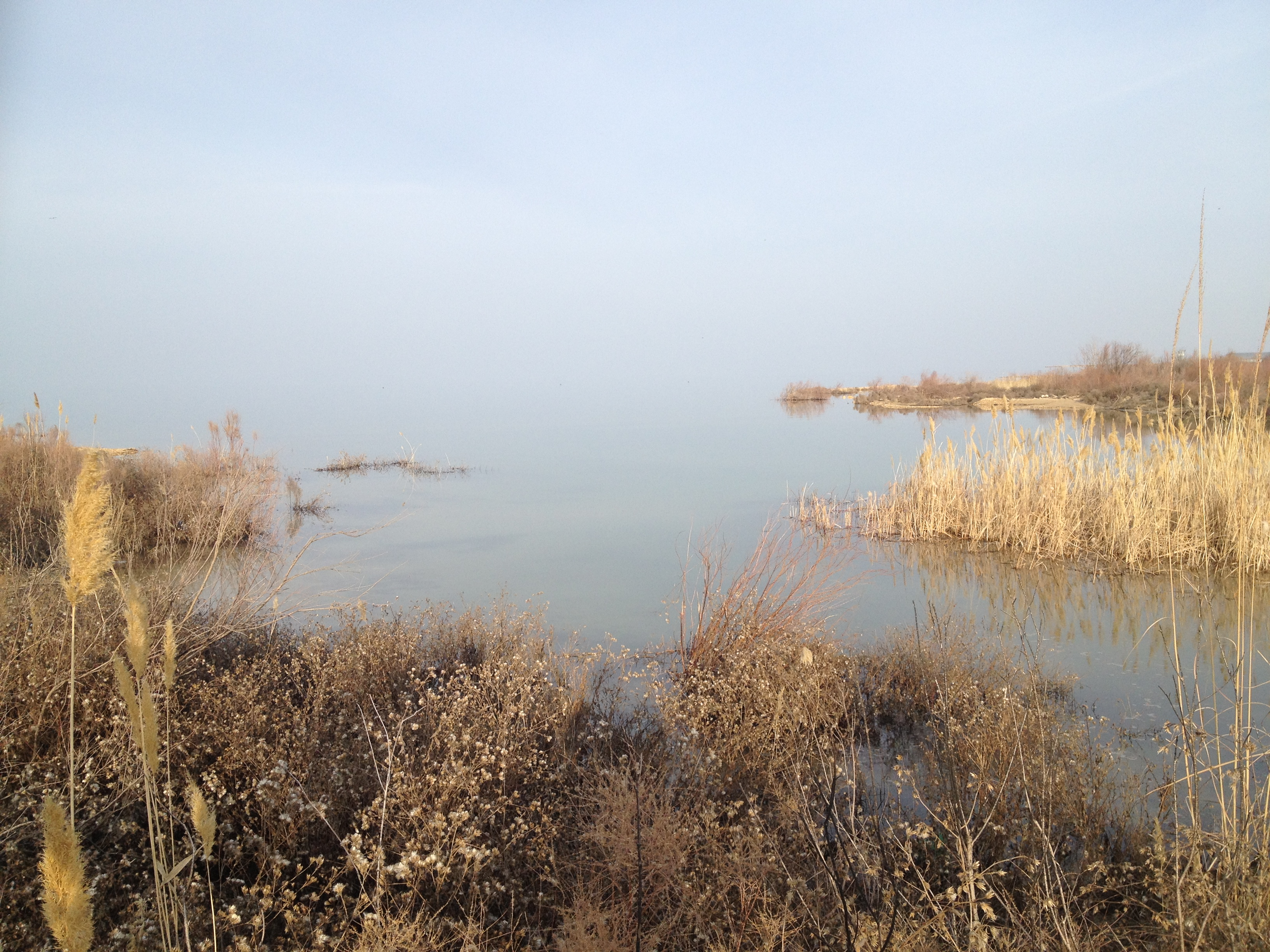
Reedbed near Tudakul

The Tudakul Water Reservoir is home to several bird species listed in the Red Book of Uzbekistan, such as the common pochard and tufted duck, as well as the great crested grebe, coot, northern shoveler, common pochard, mallard, common merganser, smew, western marsh harrier, long-legged buzzard, gull-billed tern, coot, bean goose, and pelicans. Seasonal southern migration is observed among diving birds in the reservoir. Birds that belong to the duck family inhabit the coastal swamps.

The drying up of the Amu Darya's deltas and the disappearance of the Baqra fish pose significant risks to the great crested grebes in the water basins. Among the waterfowl found in the To'dakol region are herons, bitterns, plovers, marsh harriers, and bearded reedlings.

In 1960, the To'dakol fishery was established, covering an area of 30 thousand hectares. Currently, there are no protected areas designated in Tudakul. The State Committee for Nature Protection of Uzbekistan implemented the "To'dakol and Quyimozor Water Reservoirs - New Ramsar Area" project to enter the water reservoir into the Ramsar Convention.

== Usage ==
Fish are bred in the Tudakul water reservoir. Following the denationalization of the fishery industry in Uzbekistan (2003), a joint Uzbek-American company called "Aqua-Tudakul" was established with a charter capital of 1.23 million US dollars.

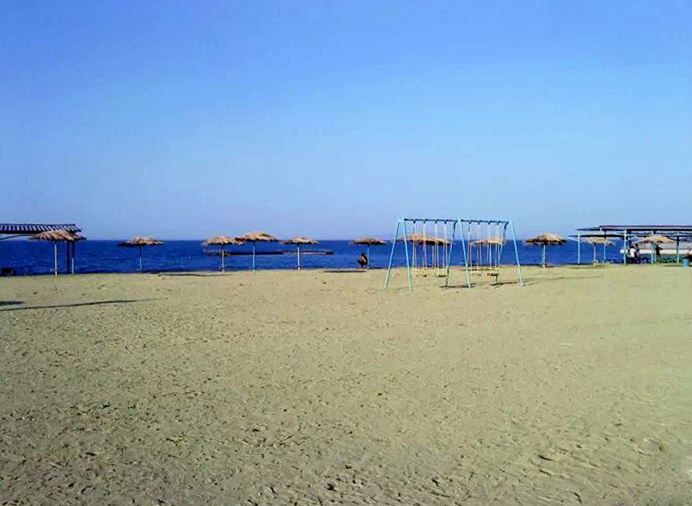
A resort on the coast of Todakol

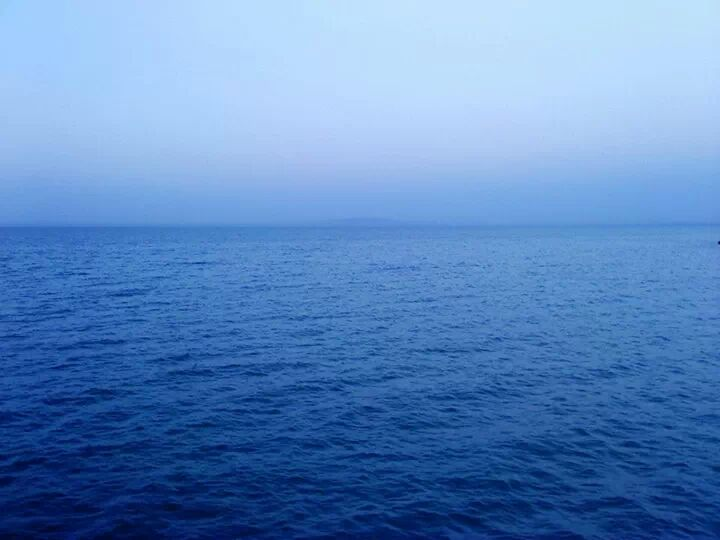
Lake Tudakul

The company is engaged in fish breeding and aquaculture, as well as in preserving the Tudakul reservoir. In 2006, the harvested fish amounted to 816 tons (previously, around 150-170 tons were harvested in the basin). The fish are primarily exported to Russia, Ukraine, Kazakhstan, and Turkey. In 2010, the company's revenue exceeded 300 million sums (with an export volume of 172.4 thousand US dollars). For the first time, Aqua-Tudakul used the method of breeding fish in artificial water reservoirs. The water reservoir area includes the "Silk Road Family Repost" tourist beach zone and the "Lazurnaya" recreation center of the Navoi Mining and Metallurgical Combine. Visitors come here for swimming, sunbathing, and even for fishing.

Plans for constructing a nuclear power plant began in 2018 near the water reservoir, with one of the two planned sites being prepared between 2019 and 2020. The construction of the nuclear power plant at Tuzkon Lake was planned accordingly.
