= Janubiy Olamushuk =

- urban-type settlement
- Location in Uzbekistan
- Coordinates: 40°45′10″N 72°36′40″E
- Country: Uzbekistan
- Region: Andijan Region
- District: Jalaquduq District
- Urban-type settlement: 1974

Population (2016)
  - Total: 7,900
- Time zone: UTC+5 (UZT)

Janubiy Olamushuk (Uzbek: Janubiy Olamushuk/Жанубий Оламушук, Russian: Южный Аламышик) is an urban-type settlement in Andijan Region, Uzbekistan. It is part of Jalaquduq District. The town population was 6,184 people in 1989, and 7,900 in 2016.
