= Chimyon =

- Location in Uzbekistan
- Coordinates: 40°15′10″N 71°34′15″E
- Country: Uzbekistan
- Region: Fergana Region
- District: Fergana District

Population (2016)
  - Total: 3,300
- Time zone: UTC+5 (UZT)

Chimyon (Uzbek: Chimyon) is an urban-type settlement in Fergana Region, Uzbekistan. It is the seat of Fergana District. Its population was 2,447 people in 1989, and 3,300 in 2016.
