= Mitan, Uzbekistan =

Mitan
- urban-type settlement
- Location in Uzbekistan
- Coordinates: 40°00′23″N 66°33′02″E
- Country: Uzbekistan
- Region: Samarkand Region
- District: Ishtixon District
- Urban-type settlement: 1986

Population (2000)
  - Total: 5,700
- Time zone: UTC+5 (UZT)

Mitan (Uzbek: Mitan/Митан, Russian: Митан) is an urban-type settlement in Samarkand Region, Uzbekistan. It is part of Ishtixon District. The town's population in 1989 was 4678 people.
