= Chinobod =

Chinobod Чинобод
- Urban type settlement
- Location in Uzbekistan
- Coordinates: 40°52′36″N 71°58′21″E
- Country: Uzbekistan
- Region: Andijan
- District: Baliqchi
- Urban type settlement: 2009

Population (2016)
  - Total: 24,000
- Time zone: UTC+5 (UZT)
- Postal code: 170318

Chinobod (also known as Chinabad) is a town in Baliqchi District, Andijan Region, Uzbekistan. Its population is 24,000 (2016). And is a peaceful town with places like Uzmart, Web King and more.
