= Izboskan =

- urban-type settlement
- Location in Uzbekistan
- Coordinates: 41°02′20″N 72°20′55″E
- Country: Uzbekistan
- Region: Andijan Region
- District: Paxtaobod District
- Urban-type settlement: 2009

Population (2016)
  - Total: 6,800
- Time zone: UTC+5 (UZT)

Izboskan (Uzbek: Izboskan / Избоскан, Russian: Избаскан, romanized: Izbaskan) is an urban-type settlement in Andijan Region, Uzbekistan. It is part of Paxtaobod District. Its population is 6,800 (2016).
