= Yorqishloq =

- Town
- Location within Uzbekistan
- Coordinates: 40°36′10″N 72°44′30″E
- Country: Uzbekistan
- Region: Andijan Region
- District: Jalaquduq District

Population (2016)
  - Total: 7,000
- Time zone: UTC+5

Yorqishloq (Uzbek: Yorqishloq / Ёрқишлоқ, Russian: Яркишлак, romanized: Yarkishlak) is an urban-type settlement in Andijan Region of Uzbekistan. It is part of Jalaquduq District. It lies near the border with Kyrgyzstan, 9 km northwest of Osh. Its population is 7,000 (2016).
