= Paxtaobod, Andijan Region =

Town in Andijan Region, Uzbekistan

Paxtaobod
- City
- Location in Uzbekistan
- Coordinates: 40°55′42″N 72°29′57″E
- Country: Uzbekistan
- Region: Andijan Region
- District: Paxtaobod District
- Town status: 1975

Population (2016)
  - Total: 34,400
- Time zone: UTC+5 (UZT)

Paxtaobod (also spelled as Pakhta-abad, Uzbek: Paxtaobod, Пахтаобод, Russian: Пахтаабад) is a city in Andijan Region, Uzbekistan. It is the administrative center of Paxtaobod District. Its population was 18,991 in 1989, 23,200 in 2003, and 34,400 in 2016.
