= Qizbibi Complex =

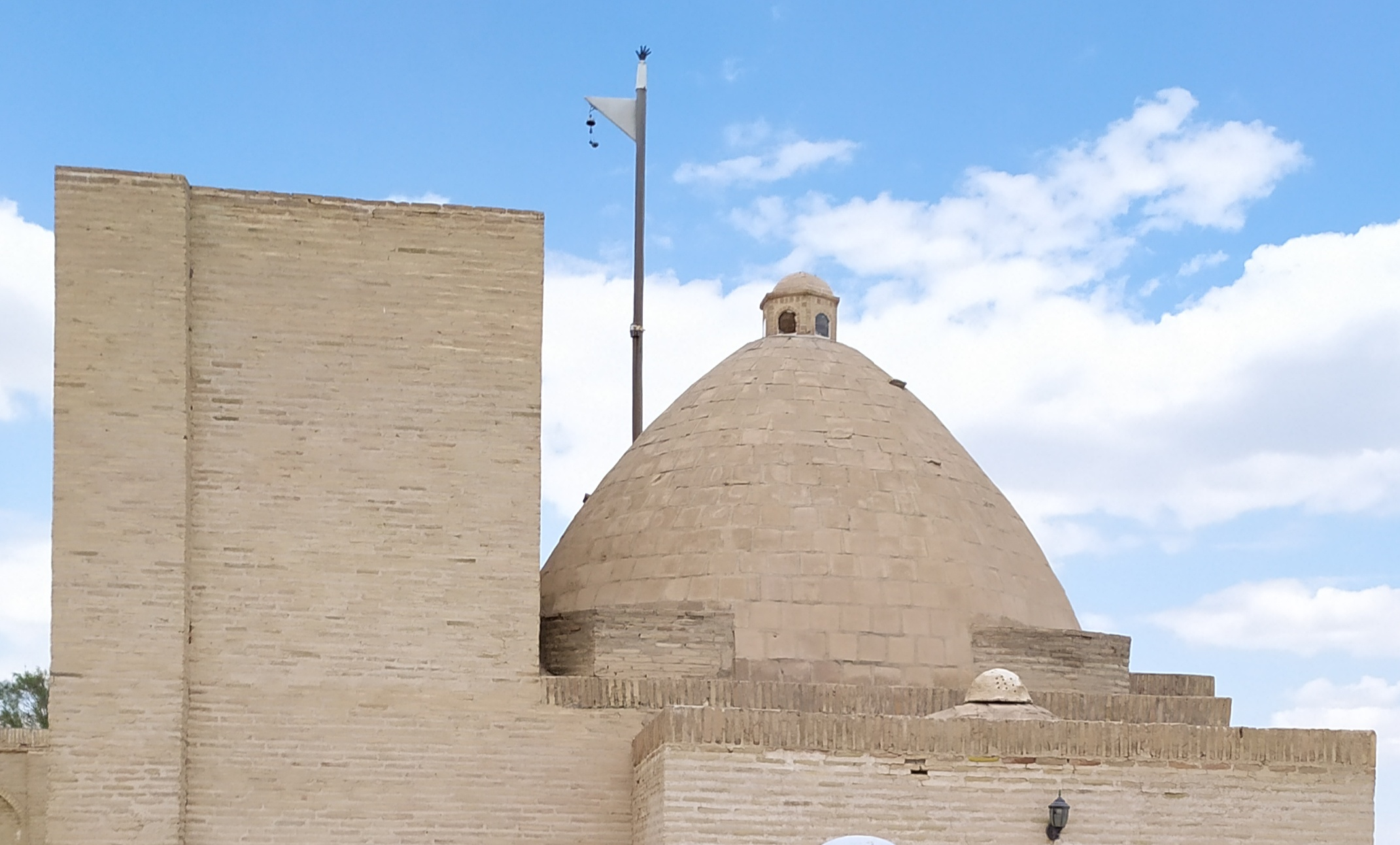
- The architectural complex Qizbibi
- Interactive map of the Qizbibi Complex area

General information
- Architectural style: Central Asian Islamic
- Location: Jondor District, Bukhara Region, Uzbekistan
- Coordinates: 39.845194°N 64.159625°E
- Year built: 16th—18th centuries

Technical details
- Material: Brick, wood, gypsum
- Size: 0.5 hectares

The Qizbibi Complex is a historical monument (16th—18th centuries) in Jondor District of Bukhara Region, Uzbekistan. It is located 30 km west of Bukhara city. The complex is named after Ogʻoyi Buzurg — Qizbibi, a famous girl who was honored by the name “Bibi Maxsumai pok”. Women came to Qizbibi's shrine to seek healing for their pains. Qizbibi Complex is an example of an architectural ensemble that has performed a wide range of functions and has a rather complex structure.

== Architecture ==
The general plan of the complex is close to a rectangle, with a total area of 0.5 hectares. Around the northern and southern courtyards there are gatehouse, cells, porticoed mosque-khanqah, mausoleum, well, bathhouse and other buildings in the empty northern part; the courtyard is covered with flat bricks. The complex is entered through a portal-domed gatehouse (plan 4.3 x 4.4 meters); on both sides of the gatehouse there are symmetrical auxiliary rooms (2.1 x 1.8 meters); the gatehouse is connected to the rooms on the western side by a corridor (0.8 x 3.1 meters): one of them is a mausoleum, the other is a chillakhona (a place for spiritual retreat); from the gatehouse there is a wide courtyard (19 x 17 meters).

On the north side of the courtyard there are smaller cells on the left of the gatehouse and larger ones on the right. In the middle of the western side there is a wide platform, a bathhouse, a well. In the courtyard there is the main building of the complex — a mosque-khanqah (8.2 x 8.2 meters), which is portal-domed and its main portal faces the Qizbibi mausoleum on the eastern side of the courtyard. On the outside, turrets are carved on three corners of the mosque-khanqah; two passages on the mihrab side connect it with the bathhouse. On the south side of the khanqah there is a portico with 9 columns (10.7 x 11.6 meters).

The complex contains three courtyards. The courtyard on the north side of the complex (33 x 9 meters) is equal to the mosque courtyard. The courtyard between the mosque and the mausoleum (23x9 m) is 60 cm lower than the northern courtyard. On the eastern side of the courtyard (the facade of the mosque) there is the Qizbibi mausoleum, which consists of two rooms: the northern room is decorated with Balkhi dome (4 x 2.8 meters), the southern room with the cenotaph (4,8х4,9 m) is covered with a simple dome, without decorations; only some parts of the exterior are plastered with gypsum; on the western side of the mausoleum there is a portico.

Of the buildings in the complex, only the mosque portico is decorated with wooden carvings, glass inserts between the stacked blocks, and flat geometric patterns. In the north-eastern part of the complex, between the gatehouse and the mausoleum, auxiliary rooms such as kitchen, pantry and others were built later (they have not been preserved). Outside the complex, in front of the gatehouse, there was another building, which served as a chillakhona. There, people with mental illnesses were treated. According to some sources, only women were allowed to enter the complex (especially the chillakhona).
