= Vehicle registration plates of Uzbekistan =

Republic of Uzbekistan
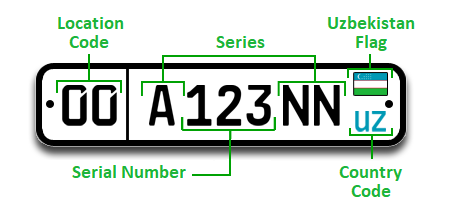
- Uzbek private vehicle registration plate.
- Country: Uzbekistan
- Country code: UZ

Current series
- Size: 520 mm × 110 mm 20.5 in × 4.3 in
- Serial format: 01 A123BC (01 regional code)
- Colour (front): Black on white
- Colour (rear): Black on white

Vehicle registration plates of Uzbekistan are required for all motor vehicles operating on public roads. Modern Uzbek plates were introduced in 1996, with the current system taking effect in 2009. Plates use a white reflective background with black characters, featuring a regional code, a numeric sequence, and a two-letter series.

The right side of the plate displays the Uzbekistan flag and the international country code “UZ”. Specialised formats exist for government vehicles, military units, foreign diplomats, and temporary registrations. As in many countries, plates must remain fully visible; obstructed or altered plates can result in administrative fines.

== Current plate format ==
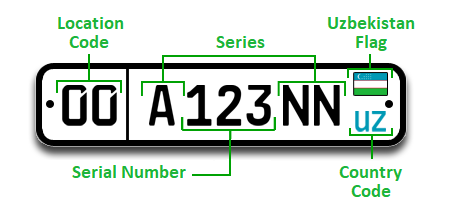
Breakdown of the main elements of the Uzbek vehicle registration plate.

The current Uzbekistan license-plate format has two variations. The standard format consists of a two-digit location code, followed by a one-letter series, three digits, and two Latin letters. The alternative format consists of a two-digit location code, three digits, and three final Latin letters. Uzbekistan uses the Latin alphabet on license plates, so only Latin characters appear in all alphanumeric positions. The first two digits indicate the region where the vehicle is registered (for example, 01 for Tashkent City, 10 for Tashkent Region, or 80 for Bukhara Region). After the regional code comes the series letter, which expands the available combinations, then a three-digit serial number, and finally two additional letters completing the registration sequence. On the right side of the plate appear the Uzbekistan flag and the international country code “UZ.”

A different format exists for trailers, which use square reflective plates with four digits at the top, followed by two letters at the bottom. Motorcycles, mopeds, and scooters also use square reflective plates, but their plates display three digits at the top followed by two letters at the bottom.

Vehicles used by certain organisations or categories of persons carry special plates:

Image	Description
	Diplomatic vehicles use plates with white characters on a green background. The plate begins with a letter prefix indicating the status of the vehicle—CMD for ambassadors, D for accredited diplomats, and T for administrative and technical staff—followed by three digits serving as a code identifying the embassy or international mission, assigned according to the order in which diplomatic relations were established with Uzbekistan.
	United Nations vehicles have blue license plates with white characters and border. The “UN” series is issued by authorization of the Ministry of Foreign Affairs (Uzbekistan). These plates are assigned to personal vehicles of heads of UN missions and specialized UN organizations, their family members, and to official or personal vehicles of accredited UN staff.
	Plates for foreign citizens start with the letter H followed by six digits. They are issued to vehicles owned or rented by foreign citizens and stateless persons who permanently reside in or temporarily stay in Uzbekistan for personal, business, study, or tourism purposes. The plates have a yellow background with black characters and a black border.
	Plates for vehicles owned by foreign companies start with the letter M followed by six digits. They are issued to cars registered to foreign businesses operating in Uzbekistan. The plates have a green background with white characters and a white border.
	Temporary and transit licence plates for exported vehicles with a Т digit in the left part of plate.
	Trailers use square reflective plates with four digits on the top and two letters on the bottom.
	Motorcycle license plates were previously issued for both motorcycles and scooters, but are now issued only for motorcycles. The plate has a white background with black edging, numbers, and letters. The upper right corner displays the territory code, while the lower right corner shows the flag and the letters “UZ.” Only one plate is issued, to be mounted on the rear of the motorcycle.

== Regional codes ==
Code After 2008	Code Before 2008	Province
01	10, 30	Tashkent (city)
10	11	Tashkent Region
20	12	Sirdaryo Region
25	13	Jizzakh Region
30	14	Samarqand Region
40	15	Fergana Region
50	16	Namangan Region
60	17	Andijan Region
70	18	Qashqadaryo Region
75	19	Surxondaryo Region
80	20	Bukhara Region
85	21	Navoiy Region
90	22	Xorazm Region
95	23	Republic of Karakalpakstan

== Diplomatic Codes ==
Code	Country
001	Turkey
002	China
003	Pakistan
004	Germany
005	India
006	France
007	Russia
008	Iran
009	Italy
010,020	United States
011	Israel
012	Jordan
013	Korea
014	Afghanistan
015	Japan
016	United Kingdom
017	Vietnam
018	Switzerland
021	Malaysia
022	Algeria
023	Indonesia
025	Saudi Arabia
026	Egypt
029	Ukraine
030	Kazakhstan
031	Poland
032	Kyrgyzstan
033	Latvia
035	South Korea
036	Palestine
037	Moldova
038	Slovakia
039	Czech Republic
040	Azerbaijan
041	South Africa
043	Bangladesh
044	Belarus
046	Georgia
052	Macedonia
053	Vatican
056	Tajikistan
057	Romania
058	Bulgaria
060	Turkmenistan
061	Kuwait
062	Netherlands
064	UAE
