= Yangiqoʻrgʻon =

Urban-type settlement in Namangan Region, Uzbekistan

- Location in Uzbekistan
- Coordinates: 41°11′14″N 71°44′0″E
- Country: Uzbekistan
- Region: Namangan Region
- District: Yangiqoʻrgʻon District

Population (1989)
  - Total: 11,561
- Time zone: UTC+5 (UZT)

Yangiqoʻrgʻon (Uzbek: Yangiqoʻrgʻon, Russian: Янгикурган, romanized: Yangikurgan) is an urban-type settlement and the administrative center of Yangiqoʻrgʻon District, Namangan Region, Uzbekistan. Population: 11,561 (1989 census).

Yangiqoʻrgʻon is located about 20 kilometres (12 mi) north of the city of Namangan. It is connected by roads with Namangan and Chortoq.
