= Baliqchi, Uzbekistan =

Baliqchi
- Town
- Location in Uzbekistan
- Coordinates: 40°54′00″N 71°51′10″E
- Country: Uzbekistan
- Region: Andijan Region
- District: Baliqchi District

Population (2016)
  - Total: 25,100
- Time zone: UTC+5 (UZT)

Baliqchi (Uzbek: Baliqchi, Балиқчи, Russian: Балыкчи) is a town in Andijan Region, Uzbekistan. It is the administrative center of Baliqchi District. Its population was 3,699 people in 1989, and 25,100 in 2016.
