= Kattakurgan (disambiguation) =

Kattakurgan is a city in Uzbekistan.

Kattakurgan may also refer to:

- Kattakurgan District, Uzbekistan
- Kattakurgan training ground – Military training area in Uzbekistan
- Kattakurgan Reservoir
