= Kamongaron Reservoir =

Reservoir in Uzbekistan (built 2015)

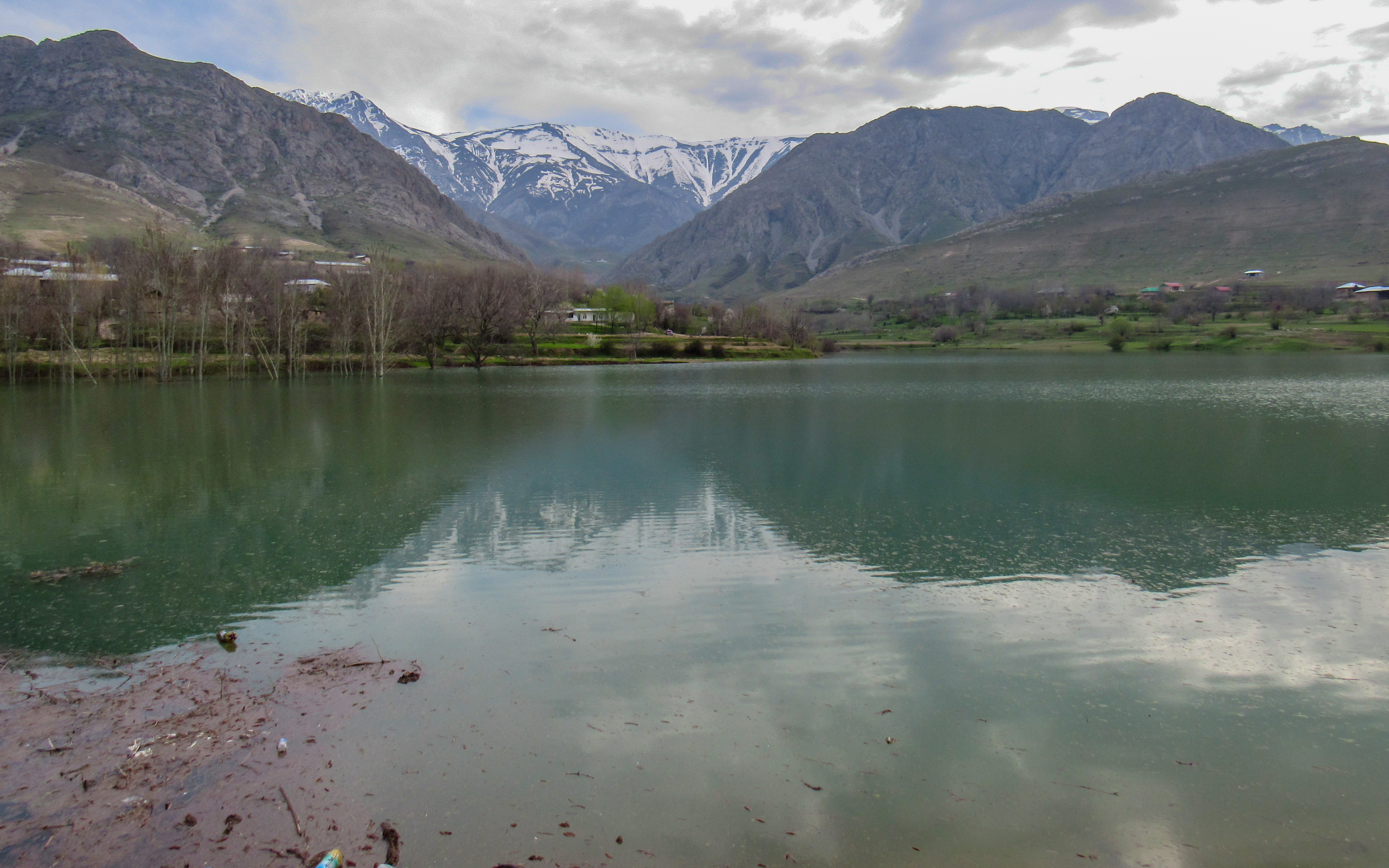
- Kamangaran Reservoir, Uzbekistan
- Interactive map of Kamongaron Reservoir
- Location: Urgut District, Samarqand Region, Uzbekistan
- Coordinates: 39°23′28″N 67°10′34″E
- Type: Reservoir
- Primary inflows: Kamongaronsoy
- Built: 2015
- Surface area: 16 ha (40 acres)
- Water volume: 1.5 million m^{3} (53 million cu ft)
- Shore length^{1}: 2 km (1.2 mi)
- ^{1} Shore length is not a well-defined measure.

Kamongaron Reservoir is a reservoir in the village of Kamongaron, near the city of Urgut, Uzbekistan. It was built in 2015 by impounding the Kamongaronsoy river. Kamongaron Reservoir has a surface area of 16 hectares (40 acres), and holds 1,5 million m^{3} at full capacity.

The water reservoir supplies water to about 100 hectares (250 acres) of land in Urgut district and improves land reclamation. It fully meets the water needs of residents and farms of Kamongaron and Vagashti villages.

More than 17 billion 884 million sums were spent on the construction of the reservoir.
