= Jomboy =

Jomboy may refer to:

- Jomboy (sports media), an American sports media personality
- Jomboy District, a district of Uzbekistan
  - Jomboy, Uzbekistan, a small town within that district
