= Dehqonobod, Jomboy District =

Dehqonobod
- Town
- Location in Uzbekistan
- Coordinates: 39°43′32″N 68°08′02″E
- Country: Uzbekistan
- Region: Samarqand
- District: Jomboy
- Urban-type settlement status: 2009
- Time zone: UTC+5 (UZT)

Dehqonobod (Uzbek: Dehqonobod shaharchasi/ Деҳқонобод шаҳарчаси) is a town of Samarqand Region in Uzbekistan. In 2009, the city's status was given.
