= Amandara =

- Location in Uzbekistan
- Coordinates: 39°26′34″N 66°24′23″E
- Country: Uzbekistan
- Region: Samarqand Region

Amandara is a village in Samarkand Region, Uzbekistan, Central Asia. It is located in Nurobod District just north of Route A378.
