= Farkhod =

Farkhod Фарход / Farxod
- urban-type settlement
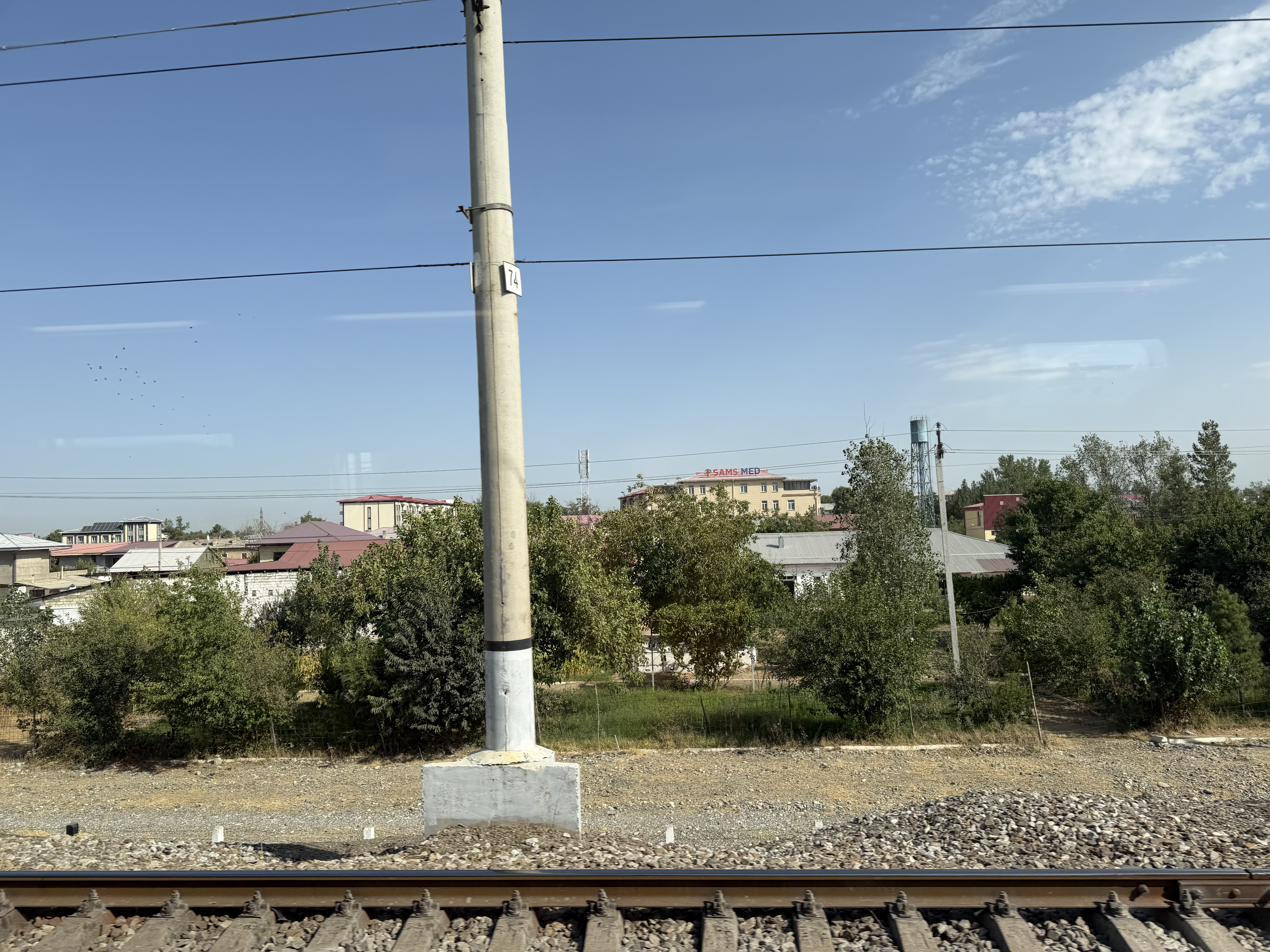

- Location in Uzbekistan
- Coordinates: 39°41′37″N 67°03′36″E
- Country: Uzbekistan
- Region: Samarkand Region
- City: Samarkand
- Urban-type settlement status: 1981

Population (1989)
  - Total: 4,134
- Time zone: UTC+5 (UZT)

Farkhod (Uzbek: Farxod/Фарход, Russian: Фархад, romanized: Farkhad) is an urban-type settlement in Samarkand Region, Uzbekistan. Administratively, it is part of the city Samarkand. The town population in 1989 was 4,134 people.
