= Kimyogarlar =

- urban-type settlement
- Location in Uzbekistan
- Coordinates: 39°40′2″N 66°50′46″E
- Country: Uzbekistan
- Region: Samarkand Region
- City: Samarkand
- Urban-type settlement status: 1952

Population (1989)
  - Total: 14,937
- Time zone: UTC+5 (UZT)

Kimyogarlar or Kimyagaron (Uzbek: Kimyogarlar/Кимёгарлар, lit. 'the Chemists', Russian: Кимёгарлар) is an urban-type settlement in Samarkand Region, Uzbekistan. Administratively, it is part of the city Samarkand. The town population in 1989 was 14,937 people.
