= Suv hovuzi =

- urban-type settlement
- Location in Uzbekistan
- Coordinates: 39°51′16″N 66°15′55″E
- Country: Uzbekistan
- Region: Samarkand Region
- District: Kattakurgan District
- Urban-type settlement: 1947

Population (1989)
  - Total: 4,668
- Time zone: UTC+5 (UZT)

Suv hovuzi (Uzbek: Suv hovuzi/Сув ҳовузи, Russian: Сув-Ховузи) is an urban-type settlement in Samarkand Region, Uzbekistan. It is part of Kattakurgan District. The town population in 1989 was 4668 people.
