= Nurobod District =

Nurobod District may refer to:

- Nurobod District, Tajikistan in the Region of Republican Subordination of Tajikistan
- Nurobod District, Uzbekistan in the Samarqand Province of Uzbekistan
