= Mirbozor =

- urban-type settlement
- Location in Uzbekistan
- Coordinates: 39°57′41″N 65°56′10″E
- Country: Uzbekistan
- Region: Samarkand Region
- District: Narpay District
- Urban-type settlement status: 1992

Population (2002)
  - Total: 5,300
- Time zone: UTC+5 (UZT)

Mirbozor (Uzbek: Mirbozor/Мирбозор) is an urban-type settlement in Samarkand Region, Uzbekistan. It is part of Narpay District. The town population in 2002 was 5300 people.
