= Ingichka =

- urban-type settlement
- Location in Uzbekistan
- Coordinates: 39°44′20″N 65°59′32″E
- Country: Uzbekistan
- Region: Samarkand Region
- City: Kattakurgan
- Urban-type settlement status: 1944

Population (1989)
  - Total: 9,676
- Time zone: UTC+5 (UZT)

Ingichka (Uzbek: Ingichka/Ингичка, Russian: Ингичка) is an urban-type settlement in Samarkand Region, Uzbekistan. Administratively, it is part of the city Kattakurgan. The town population in 1989 was 9,676 people.
