= Charxin =

- urban-type settlement
- Location in Uzbekistan
- Coordinates: 39°41′48″N 66°46′7″E
- Country: Uzbekistan
- Region: Samarkand Region
- District: Pastdargʻom District

Population (2003)
  - Total: 13,300
- Time zone: UTC+5 (UZT)

Charxin (Uzbek: Charxin) is an urban-type settlement in Samarkand Region, Uzbekistan. It is part of Pastdargʻom District. The town population in 1989 was 11,155 people.
