= Kattakurgan Reservoir =

Reservoir in Uzbekistan

Coordinates: 39°50′N 66°15′E

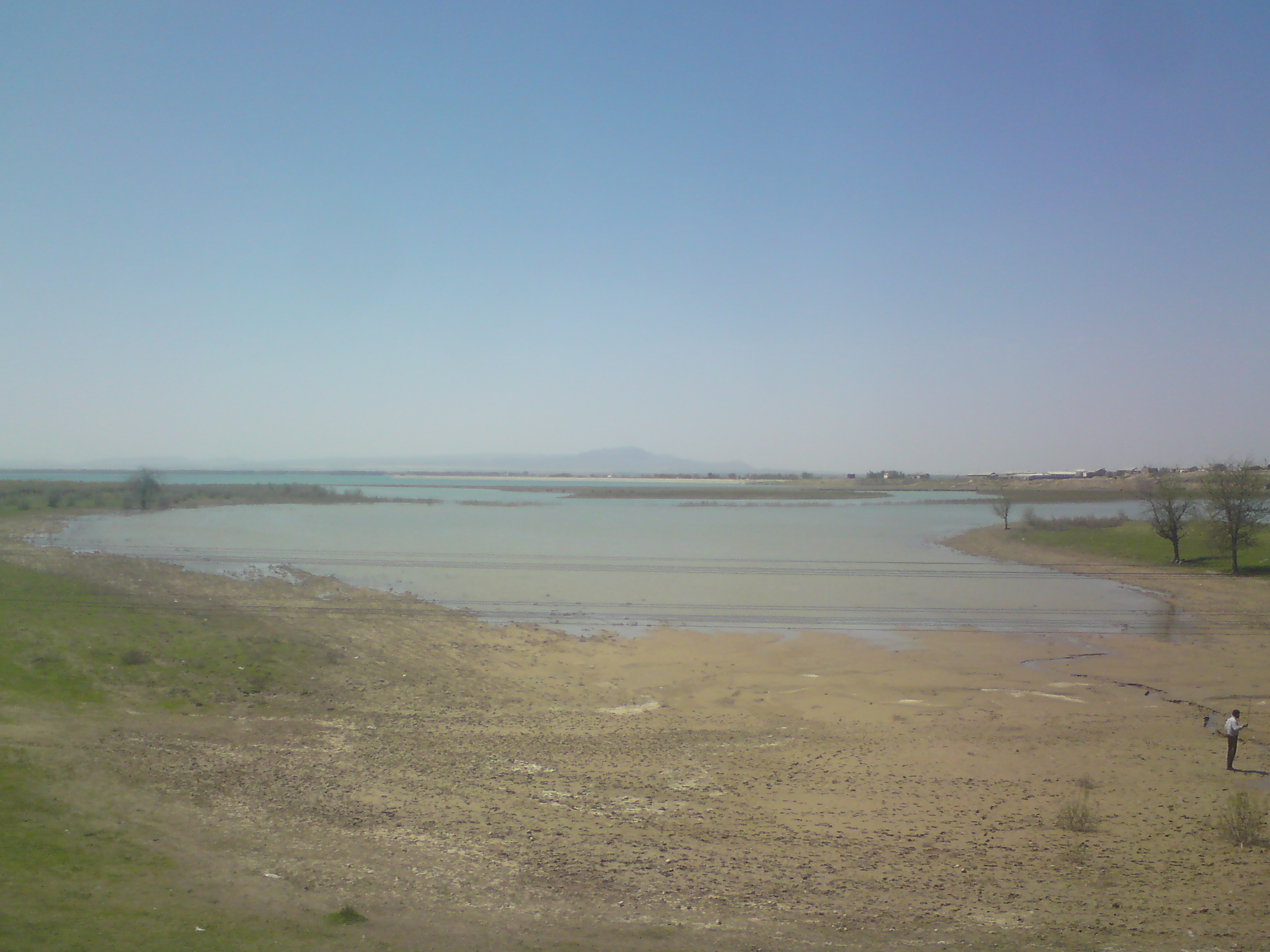

The Kattakurgan Reservoir is a reservoir on the Zeravshan River in the Kattakurgan District, Samarkand Region, Uzbekistan. Due to its large size, it is informally known as the Uzbek Sea.
