= Dahbed =

- urban-type settlement
- Location in Uzbekistan
- Coordinates: 39°45′49″N 66°54′47″E
- Country: Uzbekistan
- Region: Samarkand Region
- District: Oqdaryo District
- Urban-type settlement: 1978

Population (2002)
  - Total: 9,000
- Time zone: UTC+5 (UZT)

Dahbed (Uzbek: Dahbed/Даҳбед, Russian: Дахбед) is an urban-type settlement in Samarkand Region, Uzbekistan. It is part of Oqdaryo District. The town population in 1989 was 5959 people.
