= Khishrav =

Khishrav Хишрав / Xishrav
- urban-type settlement
- Location in Uzbekistan
- Coordinates: 39°38′18″N 66°53′23″E
- Country: Uzbekistan
- Region: Samarkand Region
- City: Samarkand
- Urban-type settlement status: 1952

Population (2012)
  - Total: 10,000
- Time zone: UTC+5 (UZT)

Khishrav (Uzbek: Xishrav) is an urban-type settlement in Samarkand Region, Uzbekistan. Administratively, it is part of the city Samarkand. The town population in 1989 was 4,209 people.
