= Bulungʻur =

- City
- Interactive map of Bulungʻur
- Location in Uzbekistan
- Coordinates: 39°45′36″N 67°16′12″E
- Country: Uzbekistan
- Region: Samarqand Region
- District: Bulungʻur District

Population (2016)
  - Total: 29,200
- Time zone: UTC+5 (UZT)

Bulungʻur (Uzbek: Bulung’ur/Булунғур) is a city in Samarqand Region, Uzbekistan. It is the capital of Bulungʻur District. The town's population was 21,030 people in 1989, and 29,200 in 2016.
