= Payshanba =

Urban-type settlement in Samarqand Region, Uzbekistan

- urban-type settlement
- Location in Uzbekistan
- Coordinates: 40°0′28″N 66°14′14″E
- Country: Uzbekistan
- Region: Samarqand Region
- District: Kattakurgan District

Population (1989)
  - Total: 11,606
- Time zone: UTC+5 (UZT)

Payshanba (Uzbek: Payshanba / Пайшанба, Russian: Пайшанба) is an urban-type settlement in Samarqand Region, Uzbekistan. It is the capital of Kattakurgan District.
