= Oqdaryo District =

Coordinates: 39.878789°N 66.753258°E

- District
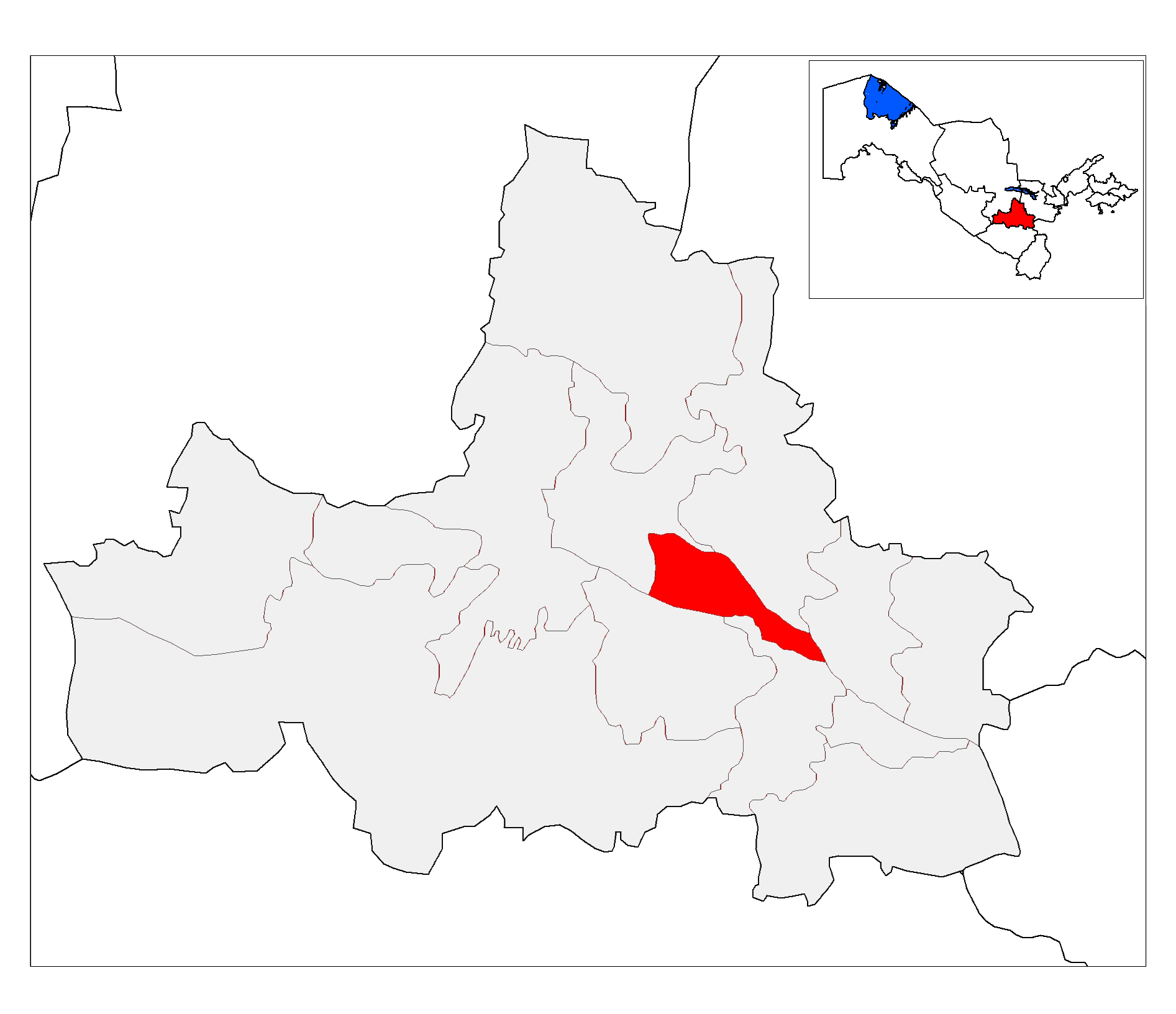
- Country: Uzbekistan
- Region: Samarqand Region
- Capital: Loyish

Area
  - Total: 390 km^{2} (150 sq mi)

Population (2021)
  - Total: 161,700
  - Density: 410/km^{2} (1,100/sq mi)
- Time zone: UTC+5 (UZT)

Oqdaryo District (Uzbek: Oqdaryo tumani) is a district of Samarqand Region in Uzbekistan. The capital lies at the town Loyish. It has an area of 390 km^{2} (150 sq mi) and its population is 161,700 (2021 est.).

The district consists of 10 urban-type settlements (Loyish, Dahbed, Avazali, Bolta, Qirqdarxon, Kumushkent, Oytamgʻali, Oqdaryo, Yangiqoʻrgʻon, Yangiobod) and 6 rural communities.
