= Bulungʻur District =

Coordinates: 39°45′36″N 67°16′12″E

- District
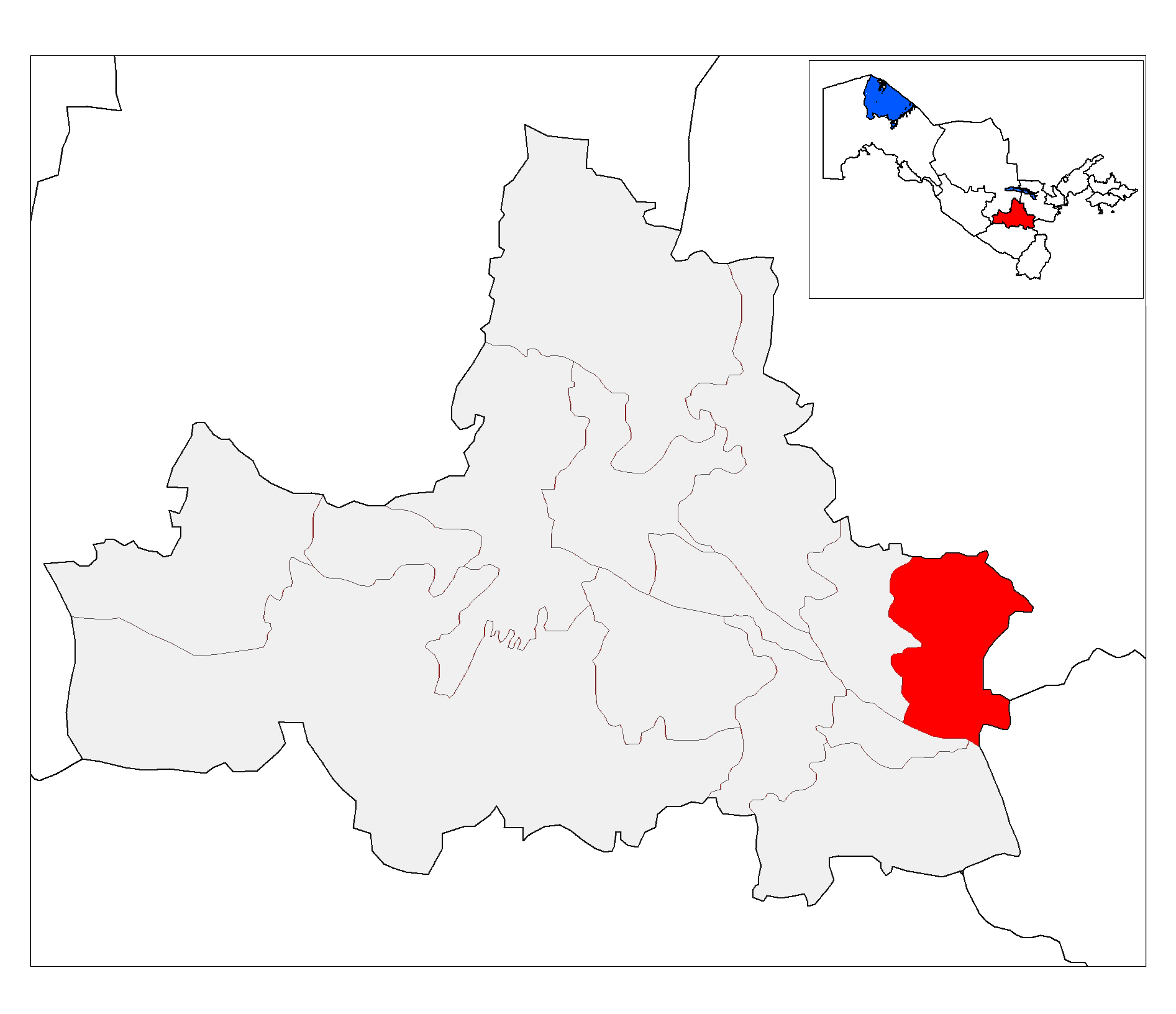
- Country: Uzbekistan
- Region: Samarqand Region
- Capital: Bulungʻur

Area
  - Total: 760 km^{2} (290 sq mi)

Population (2021)
  - Total: 189,600
  - Density: 250/km^{2} (650/sq mi)
- Time zone: UTC+5 (UZT)

Bulungʻur District is a district of Samarqand Region in Uzbekistan. The capital lies at the city Bulungʻur. It has an area of 760 km^{2} (290 sq mi) and its population is 189,600 (2021 est.).

The district consists of one city (Bulungʻur), 3 urban-type settlements (Kildon, Soxibkor, Bogʻbon) and 7 rural communities.
