= Urgut District =

- District
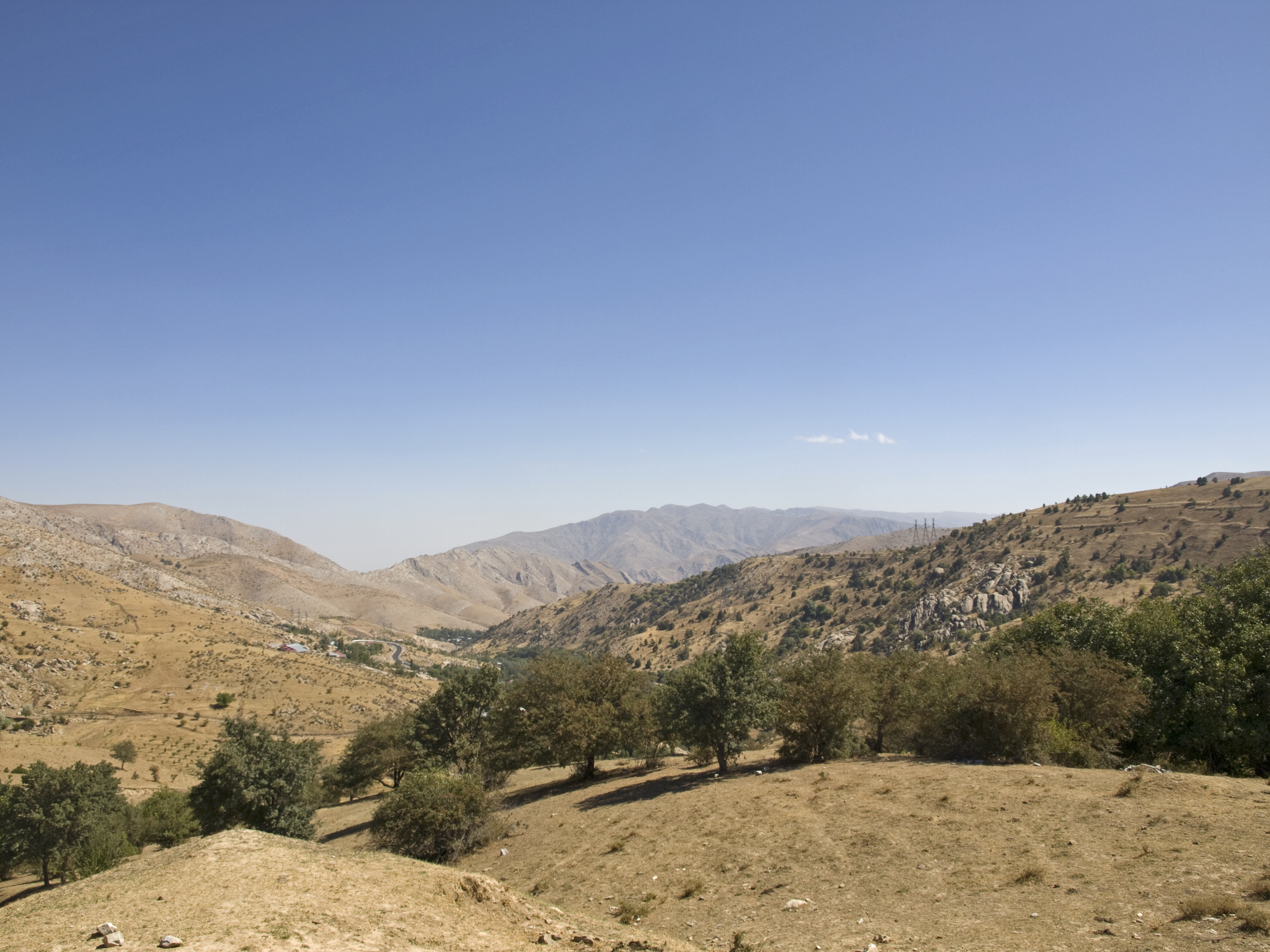
- View from Takhta-Karacha Pass (M39) to the north

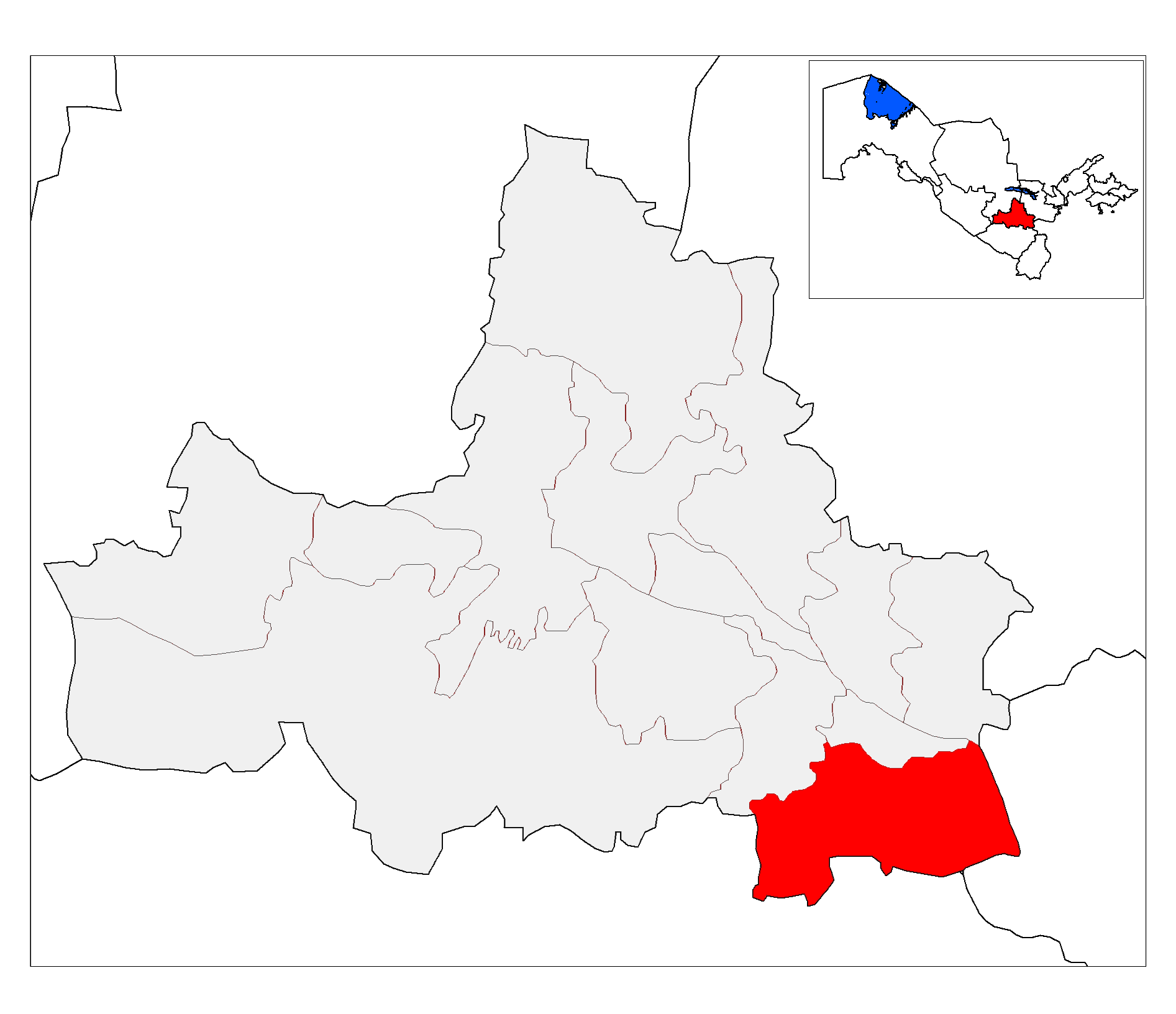
- Coordinates: 39°24′N 67°15′E
- Country: Uzbekistan
- Region: Samarqand Region
- Capital: Urgut

Area
  - Total: 1,120 km^{2} (430 sq mi)
- Elevation: 1,000 m (3,300 ft)

Population (2021)
  - Total: 519,200
  - Density: 464/km^{2} (1,200/sq mi)
- Time zone: UTC+5 (UZT)

Urgut District is a district of Samarqand Region in Uzbekistan. The capital lies at the city Urgut. It has an area of 1,120 km^{2} (430 sq mi) and its population is 519,200 (2021 est.).

The district consists of one city (Urgut), 7 urban-type settlements (Jartepa, Kamangaron, Gʻoʻs, Pochvon, Ispanza, Uramas, Kenagas) and 12 rural communities. It is located on the northern slope of the Zarafshan Range. There is a Navruz festival every spring equinox.

== Economy ==
The district produces tobacco and wool and silk products. Urgut town has market days every weekend, and is one of the largest market towns in the region. The district is home to carpets, jewels, metalwork and ceramics. The market also has smithies, tin workshops and stalls selling locally produced tea sets, clothes and traditional leather boots.

Kamongaron and Qoratepa Reservoirs were built to hold water during the wet season and used during dry one.
