= Payariq District =

Coordinates: 39°59′21″N 66°50′45″E

- District
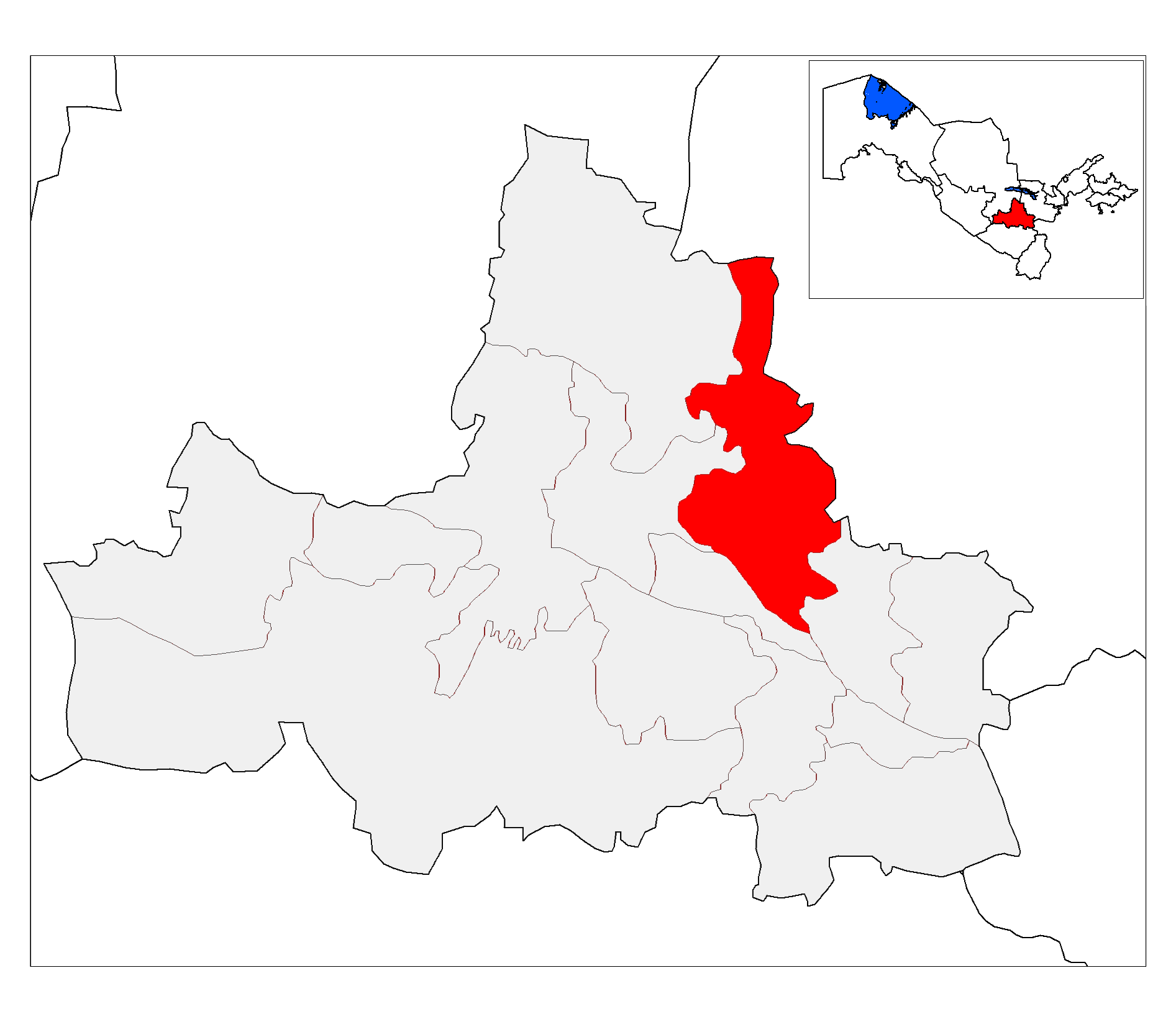
- Country: Uzbekistan
- Region: Samarqand Region
- Capital: Payariq

Area
  - Total: 1,290 km^{2} (500 sq mi)

Population (2021)
  - Total: 254,600
  - Density: 197/km^{2} (511/sq mi)
- Time zone: UTC+5 (UZT)

Payariq District is a district of Samarqand Region in Uzbekistan. Its capital is the city Payariq. It has an area of 1,290 km^{2} (500 sq mi) and its population is 254,600 (2021 est.).

The district consists of two cities (Payariq, Chelak), 9 urban-type settlements (Tomoyrat, Qorasuv, Koʻksaroy, Gʻujumsoy, Xoʻja Ismoil, Tupolos, Oqqoʻrgʻon, Doʻstlarobod, Doʻstlik) and 11 rural communities.
