= Toyloq =

- urban-type settlement
- Location in Uzbekistan
- Coordinates: 39°36′5″N 67°5′27″E
- Country: Uzbekistan
- Region: Samarqand Region
- District: Toyloq District

Population (2016)
  - Total: 13,700
- Time zone: UTC+5 (UZT)

Toyloq (Uzbek: Toyloq, Russian: Тайлак) is an urban-type settlement in Samarqand Region, Uzbekistan. It is the capital of Toyloq District. The town population was 6,548 people in 1989, and 13,700 in 2016.
