= Ziyovuddin =

- urban-type settlement
- Location in Uzbekistan
- Coordinates: 40°2′3″N 65°39′17″E
- Country: Uzbekistan
- Region: Samarqand Region
- District: Paxtachi District

Population (2000)
  - Total: 11,610
- Time zone: UTC+5 (UZT)

Ziyovuddin (Uzbek: Ziyovuddin/Зиёвуддин, Russian: Зиадин, romanized: Ziadin) is an urban-type settlement in Samarqand Region, Uzbekistan. It is the capital of Paxtachi District. The town population in 1989 was 10,160 people.

== Notable Person ==
- Server Mustafayev – Crimean Tatar human rights defender and coordinator of the civil rights organization Crimean Solidarity
