= Oqtosh =

Otosh Оқтош / Oqtosh (Uzbek) Акташ
- City
- Location in Uzbekistan
- Coordinates: 39°55′37″N 65°55′32″E
- Country: Uzbekistan
- Region: Samarqand Region
- District: Narpay District

Population (2016)
  - Total: 41,600
- Time zone: UTC+5 (UZT)

Oqtosh (Uzbek: Оқтош, Oqtosh) is a city in Samarqand Region, Uzbekistan. It is the capital of Narpay District. Its population is 41,600 (2016).
