= Samarkand District =

Coordinates: 39.580°N 66.926°E

- District
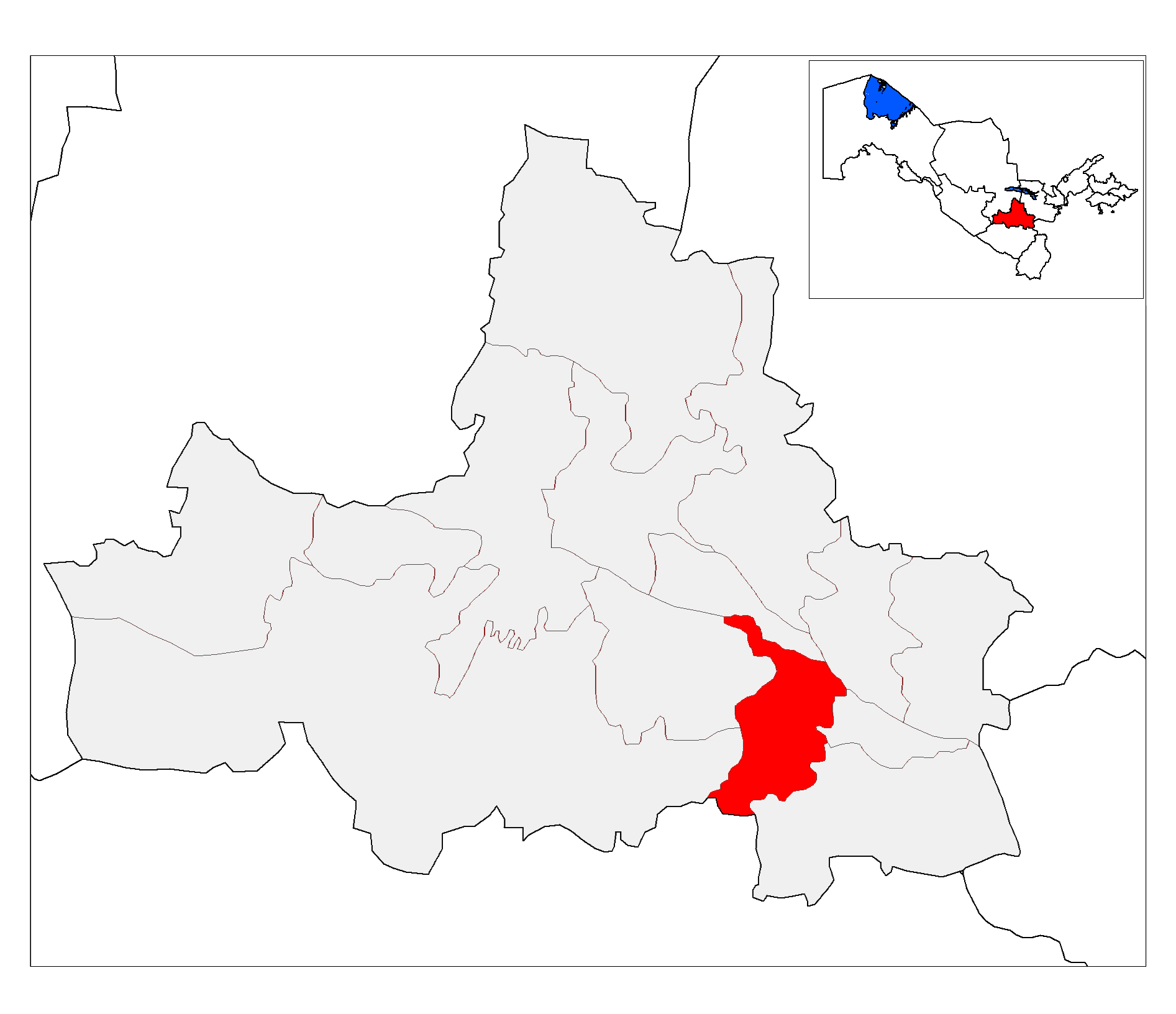
- Country: Uzbekistan
- Region: Samarkand Region
- Capital: Gulobod

Area
  - Total: 430 km^{2} (170 sq mi)

Population (2021)
  - Total: 256,500
  - Density: 600/km^{2} (1,500/sq mi)
- Time zone: UTC+5 (UZT)

Samarkand District is a district of Samarkand Region in Uzbekistan. The capital lies at Gulobod. It has an area of 430 km^{2} (170 sq mi) and its population is 256,500 (2021 est.). The district was established in 1930.

== Administrative divisions ==
As of 2020, the district contains two urban-type settlements (Gulobod and Xoʻja Ahrori Vali) and 8 rural communities:

- Ohalik
- Qoʻshtamgʻali
- Bogʻibaland
- Dashtakibolo
- Kattaqoʻrgʻonariq
- Kulbaipoyon
- Ulugʻbek
- Qaynama
