= Nurobod, Uzbekistan =

Nurobod
- City
- Location in Uzbekistan
- Coordinates: 39°36′31″N 66°17′12″E
- Country: Uzbekistan
- Region: Samarqand Region
- District: Nurobod District

Population (2016)
  - Total: 9,600
- Time zone: UTC+5 (UZT)

Nurobod (Uzbek: Nurobod, Russian: Нурабад, romanized: Nurabad) is a city in Samarqand Region, Uzbekistan. It is the capital of Nurobod District. The town population was 7,817 people in 1989, and 9,600 in 2016.
