= Loyish =

- urban-type settlement
- Location in Uzbekistan
- Coordinates: 39°53′2″N 66°44′53″E
- Country: Uzbekistan
- Region: Samarqand Region
- District: Oqdaryo District

Population (2010)
  - Total: 12 769
- Time zone: UTC+5 (UZT)

Loyish (Uzbek: Loyish/Лойиш, Russian: Лаиш, romanized: Laish)— A town in the Oqdaryo district of the Samarqand region of the Republic of Uzbekistan (since 1984). It is the Administrative center of the district. The regional center and the nearest railway station are 36 km from Samarkand. The population is 11.5 thousand people (2002). It takes water from the Oqdaryo river. The name of the town is related to its location. It is assumed that Loyish got its name from the reeds and swamps between the branches of the Zarafshan river - between Oqdaryo and Qoradaryo. In the town there is a district government building, brick, canning factories, construction organizations, communication department, cultural, commercial and household service outlets, 1 specialized 2 general education, music, special boarding schools, pedagogical college, cultural house, central library, stadium, culture and there is a recreation park (a memorial to those who died in the war was erected in the park), a hospital and other medical facilities. Katta Zarafshan highway passes through Loyish area.

== Etymology ==
While the current name of the town is Loyish, in 15th century documents the name was rendered in the form Dāyij (دایج), which originates from Sodgian δʾyh, possibly meaning "slave-woman".
