= Gulobod =

- urban-type settlement
- Location in Uzbekistan
- Coordinates: 39°35′10″N 66°57′28″E
- Country: Uzbekistan
- Region: Samarqand Region
- District: Samarqand District

Population (2016)
  - Total: 5,700
- Time zone: UTC+5 (UZT)

Gulobod (Uzbek: Gulobod, Russian: Гюлабад, romanized: Gyulabad) is an urban-type settlement in Samarqand Region, Uzbekistan. It is the seat of Samarqand District. Its population was 779 people in 1989, and 5,700 in 2016.
