= Payariq =

- City
- Location in Uzbekistan
- Coordinates: 39°59′21″N 66°50′45″E
- Country: Uzbekistan
- Region: Samarqand Region
- District: Payariq District

Population (2022)
  - Total: 12,345
- Time zone: UTC+5 (UZT)

Payariq (Uzbek: Payariq/Пайариқ, Russian: Пайарык, romanized: Payaryk, formerly mekishovka) is a city in Samarqand Region, Uzbekistan. It is the capital of Payariq District. It is located along the mountains of Nurota. Nearest railroad station - Ulugbek(40 km). The town's population was 7,949 people in 1989, and 10,600 in 2016.
