= Server Mustafayev =

Ukrainian human rights activist

- Сервер Мустафаєв
- Born: 5 May 1986 (age 40); Ziadin, Uzbekistan
- Occupation: Human rights worker

Server Rustemovych Mustafayev (Ukrainian: Сервер Рустемович Мустафаєв, born 5 May 1986) is a Crimean Tatar human rights defender and coordinator of the civil rights organization Crimean Solidarity.

== Life ==
Mustafayev was born on 5 May 1986, in Ziadin. His family returned to Crimea where he lived in Bakhchysarai. In 2014 Mustafayev began to actively help families of political prisoners and became one of the coordinators of the civil rights organization Crimean Solidarity, whose activities are aimed at providing legal assistance to the families of political prisoners of Crimea.

On 21 May 2018, officers of the Federal Security Service of the Russian Federation conducted a search in the house of Server Mustafayev in Bakhchisarai and took him to Simferopol.

He was charged with Part 2 of Art. 205.5 (“Participation in the activity of a terrorist organization”, up to 20 years in prison), part 1 of Art. 30 and Art. 278 of the Criminal Code ("Preparation for violent seizure of power", up to 10 years in prison).

Mustafayev's lawyer said that the only evidence against him was an audio recording with several short replies, including a question posed by Server Mustafayev during a meeting in a mosque on 2 December 2016. Mustafayev wanted to know if a person could be liked "in general", but at the same time arouse hatred for a certain act and developed an idea. This meeting was announced in advance. Despite this investigation, it was concluded that Mustafayev participated in a secret meeting of the Islamist organization "Hizb ut-Tahrir."

In March 2020, the Ukrainian government made a statement protesting his treatment, saying he was showing symptoms of COVID-19, but being denied proper treatment.

On 16 September 2020, Mustafayev was sentenced by a Russian military court to fourteen years in a strict regime penal colony.

== Reaction ==
The Russian civil rights society Memorial has included Server Mustafayev in the "Support program for political prisoners".

Amnesty International and the international organization Front Line Defenders demand Mustafayev's immediate release. According to Human Rights Watch the sentenced prison terms against Mustafayev and six other Crimean Tatars are part of a pattern of politically motivated prosecutions that have been happening since the annexation of Crimea by the Russian Federation.

In June 2018 the European Parliament adopted a resolution in which it demands Russian authorities to immediately and unconditionally release illegally detained Ukrainian citizens including Server Mustafayev.

The United States Mission to the Organization for Security and Cooperation in Europe declared its concern about the health conditions of Crimean Tatar political prisoners, including Server Mustafayev and called for his release.

On 10 December 2022 Oleksandra Matviichuk, head of the Center for Civil Liberties, mentioned Server Mustafayev in the Nobel Lecture given at the 2022 Nobel Peace Prize award ceremony: "The international system of peace and security does not work anymore. Crimean Tatar Server Mustafayev as well as many others are put in Russian prisons because of their human rights work".

== Awards ==
On 21 August 2020, Mustafayev was awarded by Ukrainian president Volodymyr Zelenskyy with the Order of Merit.

On 21 May 2025, Mustafayev was awarded the Alfred Moses Liberty Award by Freedom House.
