= Toyloq District =

Coordinates: 39°36′05″N 67°05′27″E

Taylak district
- District
- Toyloq tumani
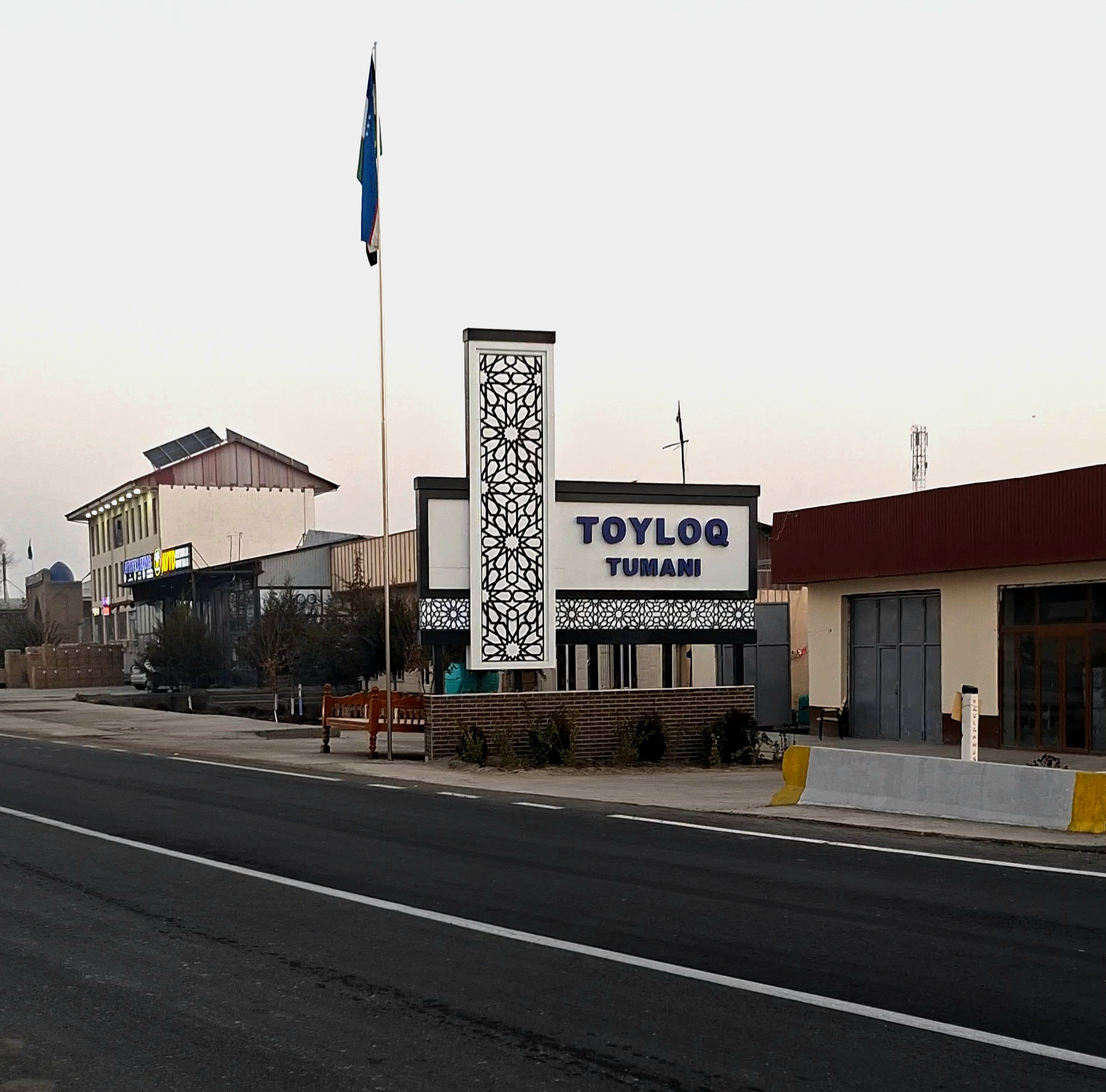

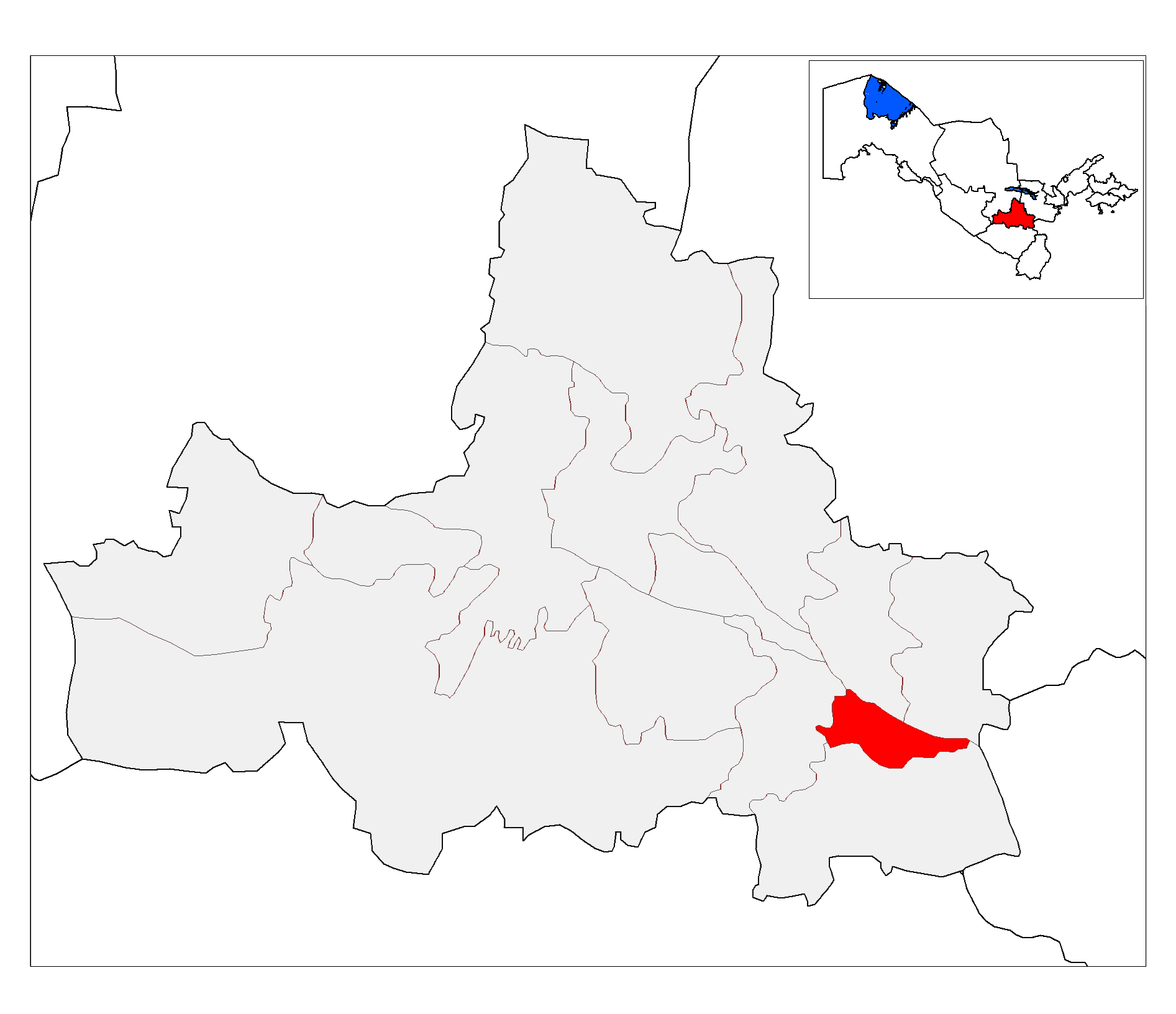
- Country: Uzbekistan
- Region: Samarqand Region
- Center: Toyloq shahri

Government

Area
  - Total: 280 km^{2} (110 sq mi)

Population (2026)
  - Total: 231,100
  - Density: 830/km^{2} (2,100/sq mi)
- Time zone: UTC+5 (UZT)
- Website: Toyloq.uz

Toyloq tumani is a district of Samarqand Region in Uzbekistan. The capital lies at the town Toyloq. It has an area of 280 km^{2} (110 sq mi) and its population is 231,100 (2026est.).

The district consists of 3 urban-type settlements (Toyloq, Adas, Bogʻizagʻon) and 9 rural communities.
