= Pastdargʻom District =

Coordinates: 39.717168°N 66.658112°E

- District
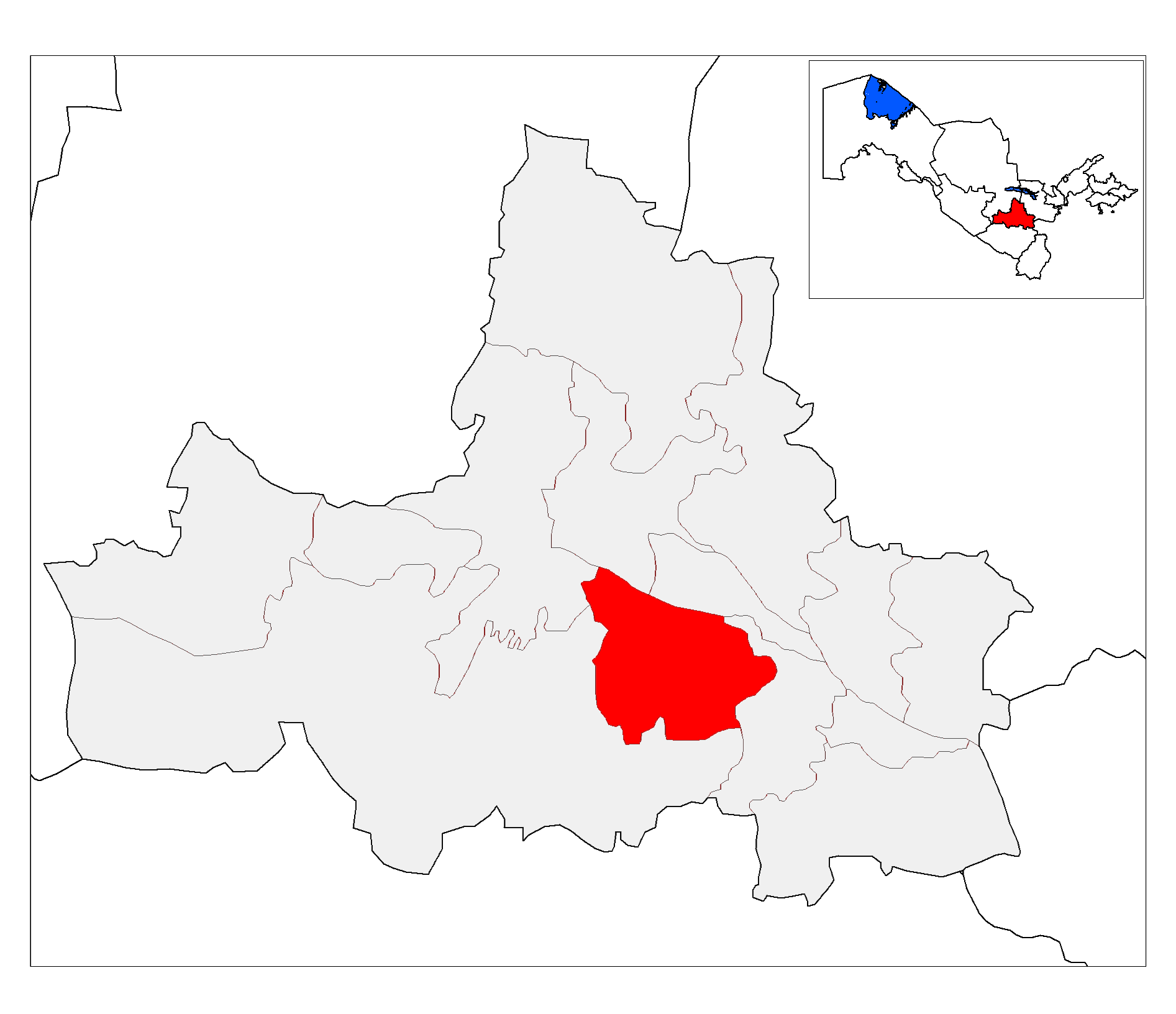
- Country: Uzbekistan
- Region: Samarqand Region
- Capital: Juma

Area
  - Total: 870 km^{2} (340 sq mi)

Population (2021)
  - Total: 360,000
  - Density: 410/km^{2} (1,100/sq mi)
- Time zone: UTC+5 (UZT)

Pastdargʻom District (Uzbek: Pastdarg‘om, Past Darg‘om tumani) is a district of Samarqand Region in Uzbekistan. The capital lies at the city Juma. It has an area of 870 km^{2} (340 sq mi) and its population is 360,000 (2021 est.).

The district consists of one city (Juma), 12 urban-type settlements (Charxin, Chortut, Oʻrta Charxin, Balhiyon, Goʻzalkent, Nayman, Jagʻalboyli, Mehnat, Hindiboyi, Agron, Iskandari, Saribosh) and 13 rural communities.
