= Narpay District =

Coordinates: 39.9223°N 65.925°E

- District
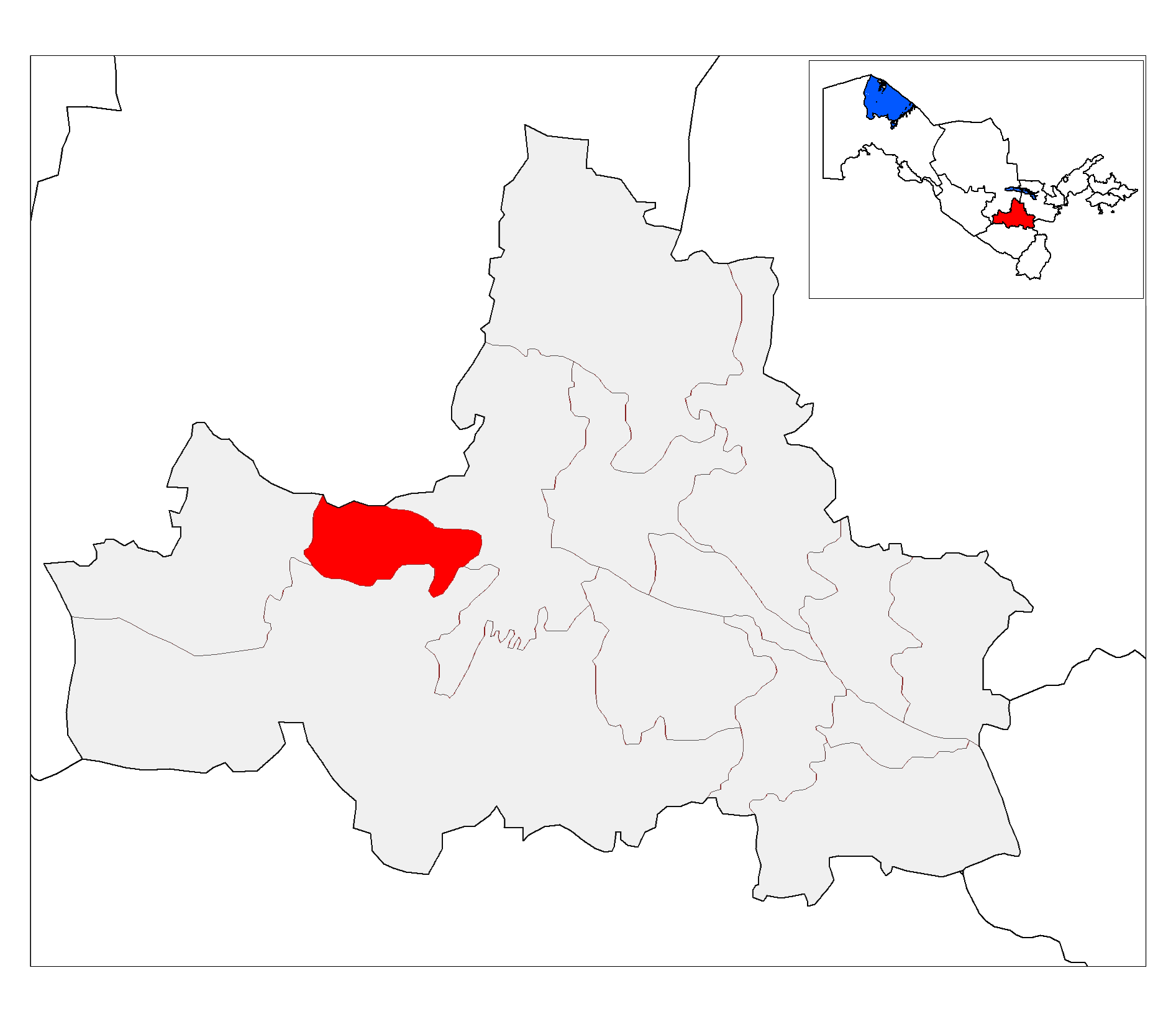
- Country: Uzbekistan
- Region: Samarqand Region
- Capital: Oqtosh

Area
  - Total: 440 km^{2} (170 sq mi)

Population (2021)
  - Total: 215,500
  - Density: 490/km^{2} (1,300/sq mi)
- Time zone: UTC+5 (UZT)

Narpay District is a district of Samarqand Region in Uzbekistan. The capital lies at the city Oqtosh. It has an area of 440 km^{2} (170 sq mi) and its population is 215,500 (2021 est.).

The district consists of one city (Oqtosh), 3 urban-type settlements (Mirbozor, Guliston, Qoʻyi Charxin) and 9 rural communities.
