= Chelak, Uzbekistan =

Chelak
- City
- Location in Uzbekistan
- Coordinates: 39°55′13″N 66°51′40″E
- Country: Uzbekistan
- Region: Samarkand Region
- District: Payariq District
- Town status: 1981

Population (2016)
  - Total: 20,800
- Time zone: UTC+5 (UZT)

Chelak (Uzbek: Chelak, Челак, Russian: Челек) is a city in Samarkand Region, Uzbekistan. It is part of Payariq District. The town population was 13,110 people in 1989, and 20,800 in 2016.
