= Paxtachi District =

Coordinates: 40°01′47″N 65°39′59″E

- District
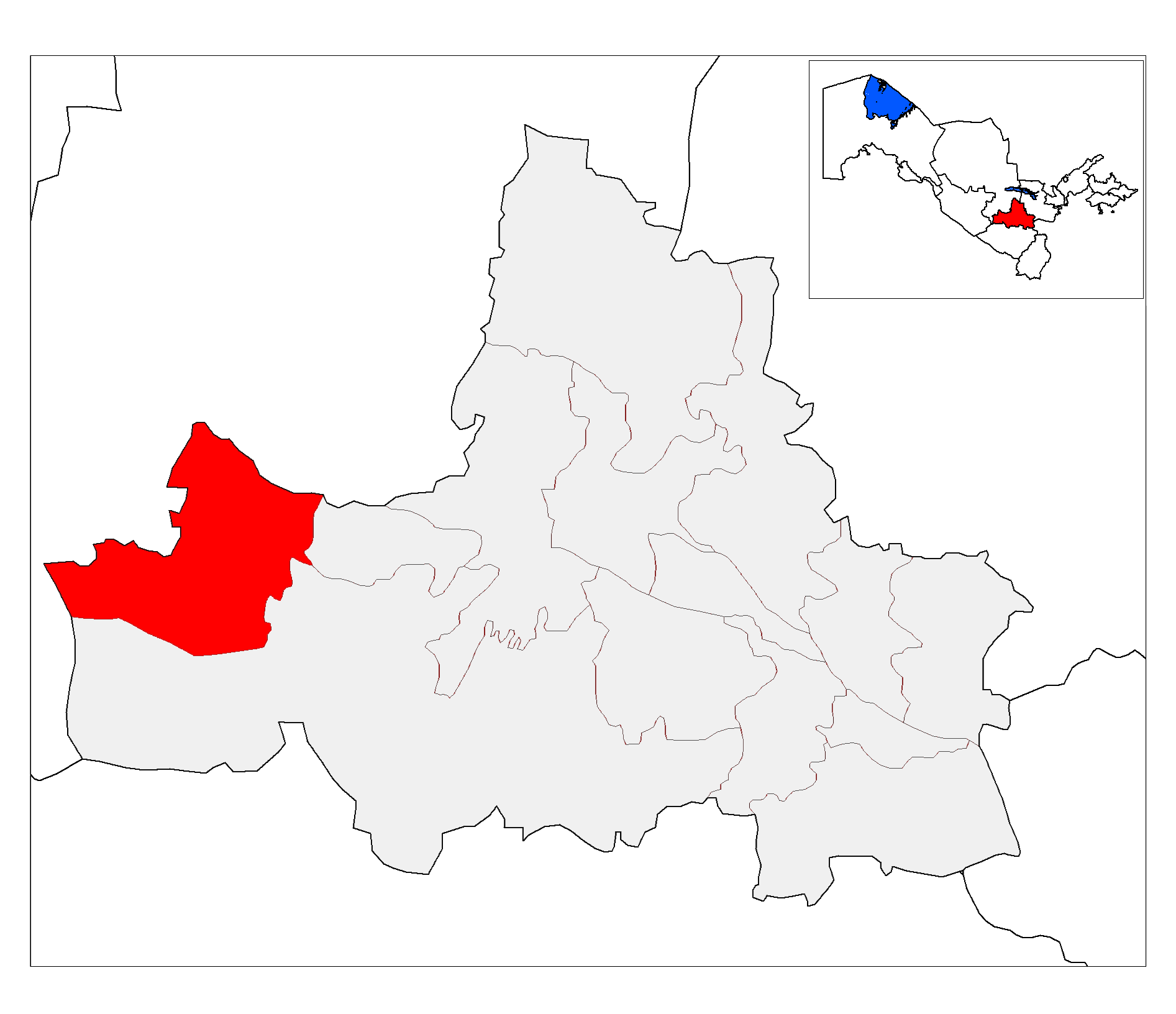
- Country: Uzbekistan
- Region: Samarqand Region
- Capital: Ziyovuddin

Area
  - Total: 1,380 km^{2} (530 sq mi)

Population (2021)
  - Total: 146,000
  - Density: 106/km^{2} (274/sq mi)
- Time zone: UTC+5 (UZT)

Paxtachi District is a district of Samarqand Region in Uzbekistan. The capital lies at the town Ziyovuddin. It has an area of 1,380 km^{2} (530 sq mi) and its population is 146,000 (2021 est.).

The district consists of 7 urban-type settlements (Ziyovuddin, Qodirist, Past Burkut, Sanchiqul, Suluvqoʻrgʻon, Urgich, Xumor) and 8 rural communities.
