= Qoʻshrabot District =

Coordinates: 40.729177°N 66.107118°E

- District
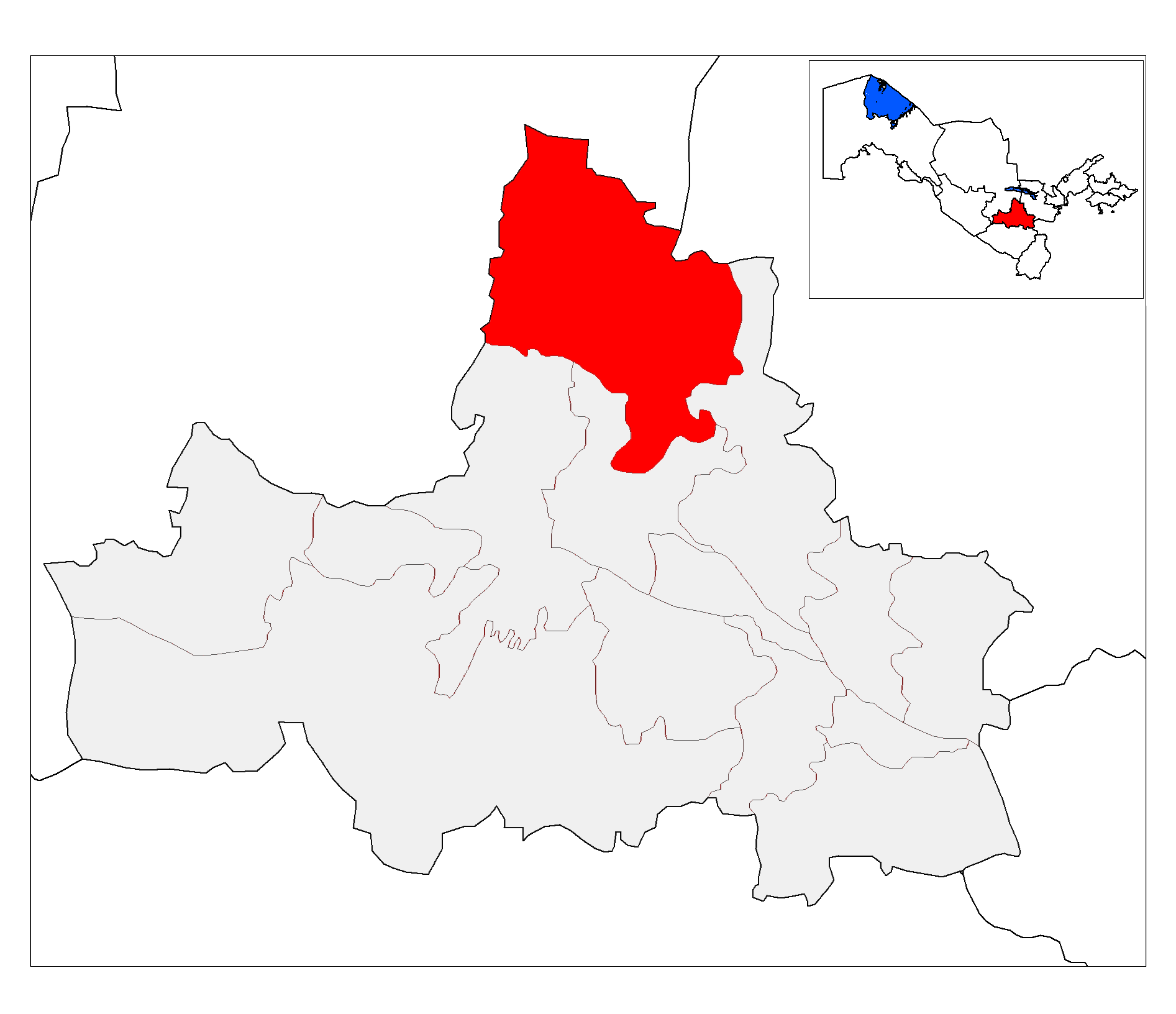
- Country: Uzbekistan
- Region: Samarqand Region
- Capital: Qoʻshrabot

Area
  - Total: 2,160 km^{2} (830 sq mi)

Population (2021)
  - Total: 133,600
  - Density: 61.9/km^{2} (160/sq mi)
- Time zone: UTC+5 (UZT)

Qoʻshrabot District is a district of Samarqand Region in Uzbekistan. The capital lies at the town Qoʻshrabot. It has an area of 2,160 km^{2} (830 sq mi) and its population is 133,600 (2021 est.).

The district consists of two urban-type settlements (Qoʻshrabot, Zarkent) and 7 rural communities.
