= Juma, Uzbekistan =

Juma
- City
- Location in Uzbekistan
- Coordinates: 39°42′58″N 66°39′51″E
- Country: Uzbekistan
- Region: Samarqand Region
- District: Pastdargʻom District

Population (2016)
  - Total: 21,500
- Time zone: UTC+5 (UZT)

Juma (Uzbek: Juma/Жума, lit. 'Friday',) is a city in Samarqand Region, Uzbekistan. It is the capital of Pastdargʻom District. The population of the town was 15,571 people in 1989, and 21,500 in 2016.
