= Qoʻshrabot =

- urban-type settlement
- Location in Uzbekistan
- Coordinates: 40°14′50″N 66°39′02″E
- Country: Uzbekistan
- Region: Samarqand Region
- District: Qoʻshrabot District

Population (2016)
  - Total: 8,500
- Time zone: UTC+5 (UZT)

Qoʻshrabot (Uzbek: Qoʻshrabot, Russian: Кошрабад, romanized: Koshrabad) is an urban-type settlement in Samarqand Region, Uzbekistan. It is the capital of Qoʻshrabot District. Its population was 1,999 people in 1989, and 8,500 in 2016.

== Climate ==
Qoʻshrabot has a continental climate with Mediterranean influences (Köppen: Csa/Dsa) with cold winters and very hot, dry summers.

Climate data for Qoʻshrabot (1991–2020)
Month	Jan	Feb	Mar	Apr	May	Jun	Jul	Aug	Sep	Oct	Nov	Dec	Year
Mean daily maximum °C (°F)	5.7 (42.3)	7.7 (45.9)	14.2 (57.6)	20.7 (69.3)	26.6 (79.9)	32.5 (90.5)	35.0 (95.0)	34.0 (93.2)	29.0 (84.2)	21.7 (71.1)	13.6 (56.5)	7.9 (46.2)	20.7 (69.3)
Daily mean °C (°F)	0.1 (32.2)	2.0 (35.6)	7.7 (45.9)	13.8 (56.8)	19.3 (66.7)	24.8 (76.6)	27.4 (81.3)	26.0 (78.8)	20.0 (68.0)	12.7 (54.9)	6.2 (43.2)	1.8 (35.2)	13.5 (56.3)
Mean daily minimum °C (°F)	−4.0 (24.8)	−2.2 (28.0)	2.6 (36.7)	7.5 (45.5)	11.6 (52.9)	15.9 (60.6)	18.5 (65.3)	17.0 (62.6)	11.0 (51.8)	4.9 (40.8)	0.7 (33.3)	−2.4 (27.7)	6.8 (44.2)
Average precipitation mm (inches)	55.6 (2.19)	69.2 (2.72)	71.3 (2.81)	57.6 (2.27)	34.8 (1.37)	9.5 (0.37)	2.9 (0.11)	2.2 (0.09)	2.7 (0.11)	11.9 (0.47)	40.8 (1.61)	47.0 (1.85)	405.5 (15.96)
Average precipitation days (≥ 1.0 mm)	11	11	11	10	7	3	1	1	1	4	8	10	78
Source: NOAA
