= Kattakurgan =

Kattakurgan Uzbek: Каттақўрғон, Kattaqoʻrgʻon Каттакурган
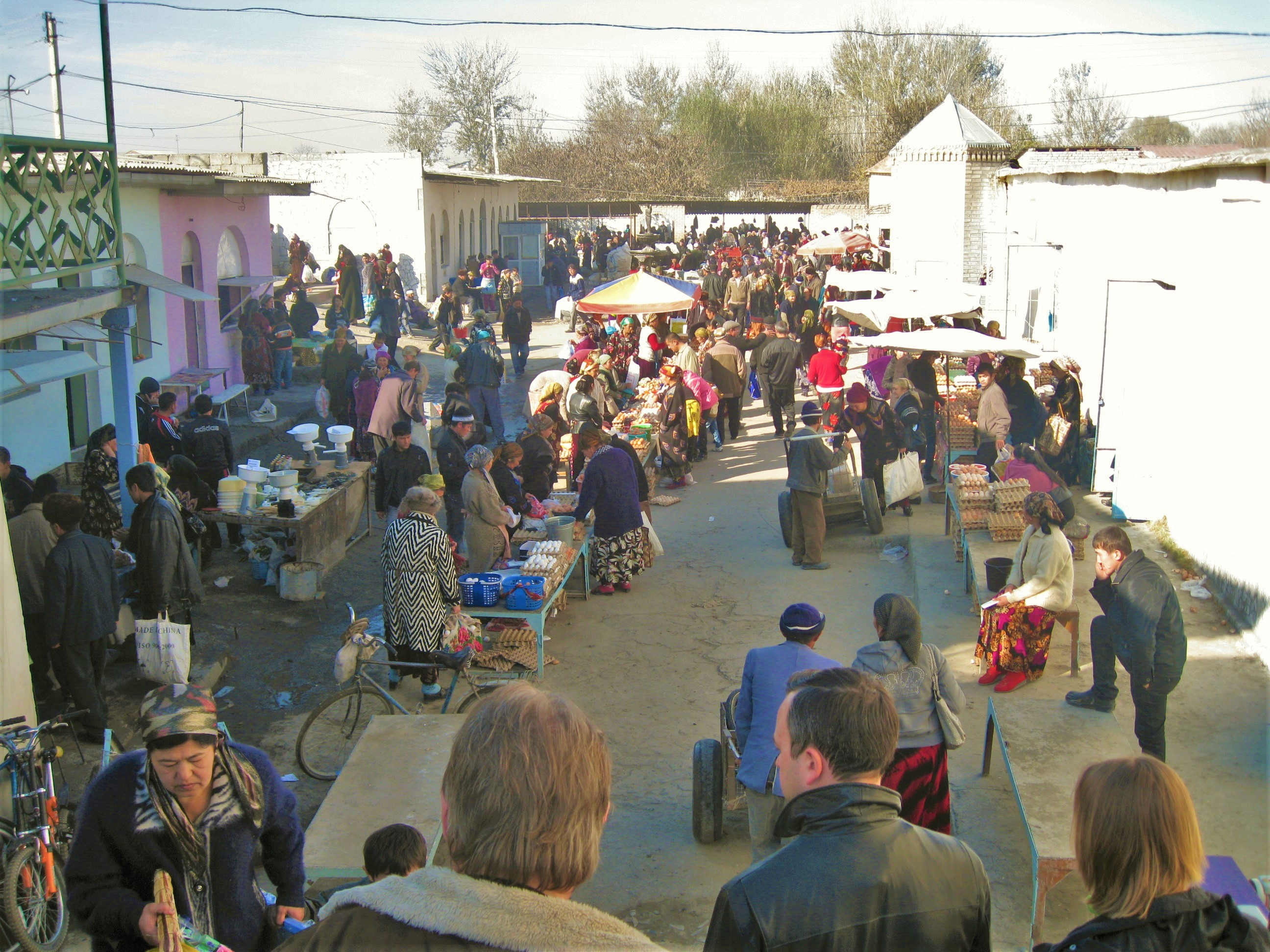
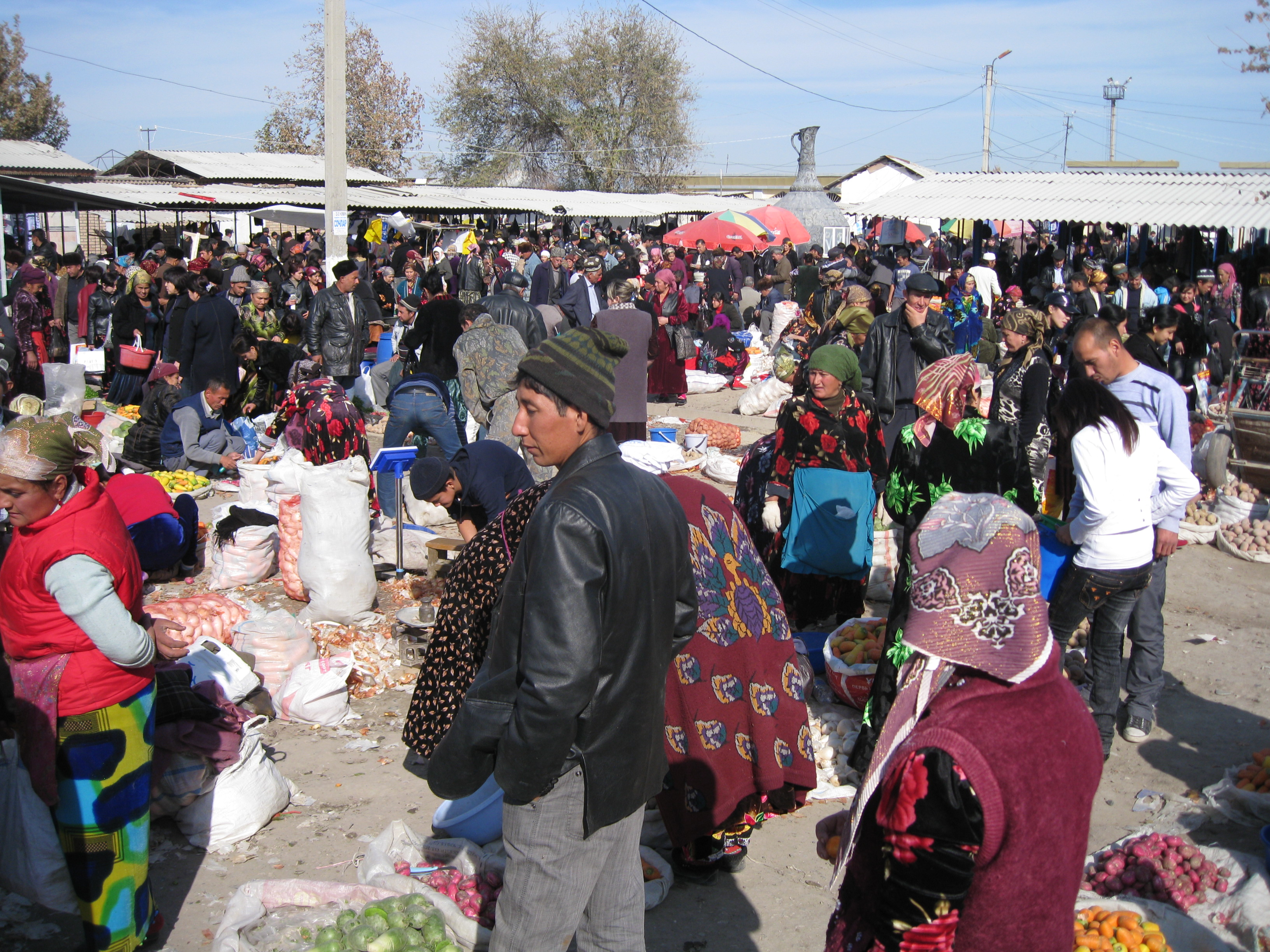
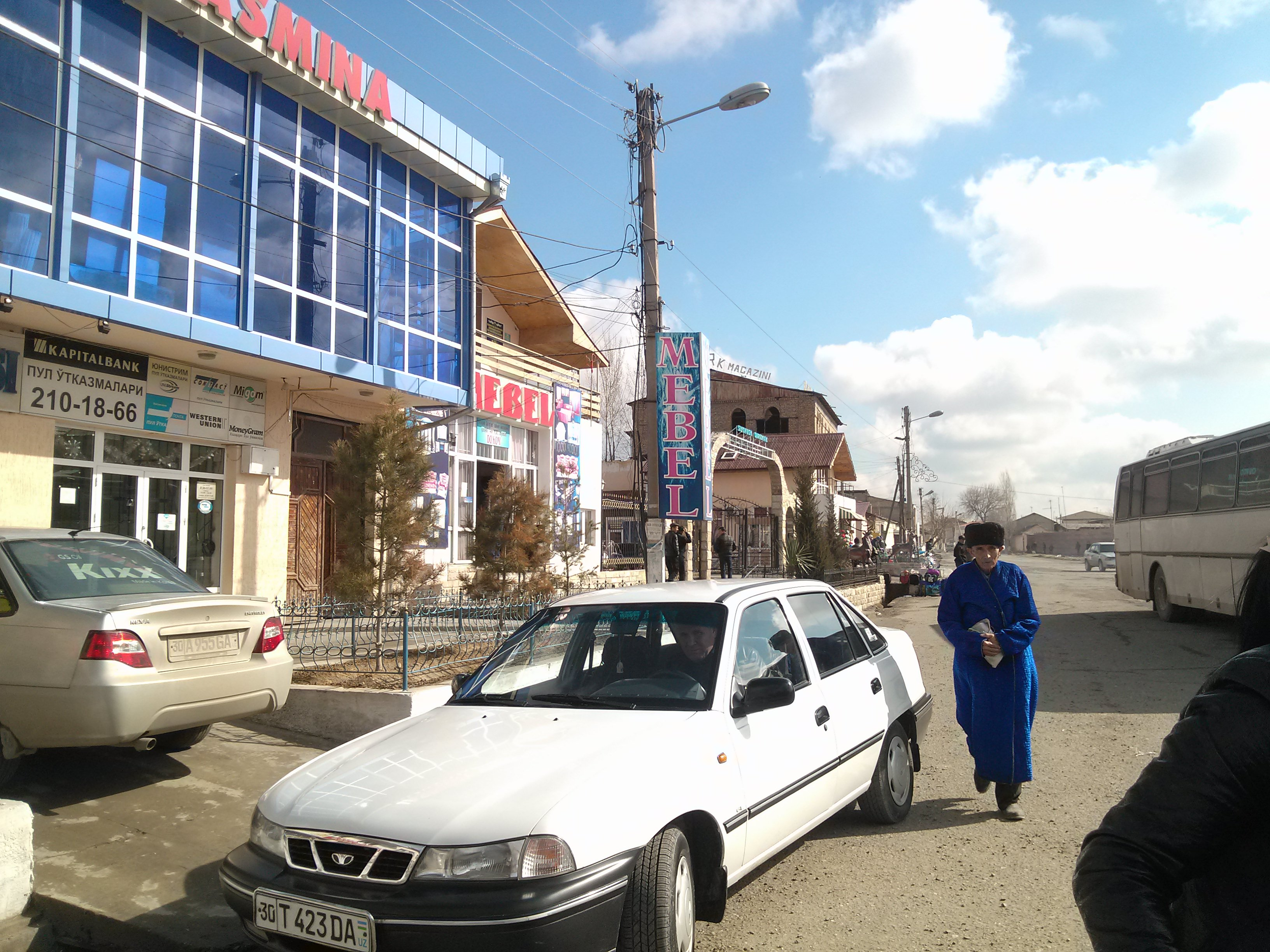

- Location in Uzbekistan
- Coordinates: 39°53′56″N 66°15′22″E
- Country: Uzbekistan
- Region: Samarqand Region
- Elevation: 480 m (1,570 ft)

Population (2021)
  - City: 90,600
  - Urban: 100%
- Time zone: GMT + 5

Kattakurgan (Uzbek: Каттақўрғон, Kattaqoʻrgʻon) is a city in the Samarqand Region of Uzbekistan, in the Zarafshon River valley. Administratively, it is a district-level city, that includes the urban-type settlement Ingichka. It has 90,600 inhabitants (2021). It is located on the road and railway between Bukhara and Samarkand.

== Etymology ==
The name Katta + qoʻrgʻon means "large city-fortress, mausoleum, hillfort, or kurgan" in Uzbek language.

== History ==
The town does not appear to be of any great antiquity, although after Alexander the Great's ransacking of Marakanda (Samarkand), the center of cultural life in that part of the Zeravshan valley may briefly have shifted west to the region around Katta-Kurgan.

According to F.F. Pospelov, a fortress was built on the current site by the local saint Sufi Allahyar and his two brothers, Farhat-Atalyk and Allah-Nazar-bii, in 1684, and the town subsequently grew up around it. Modern Kattakurgan (its oldest part is the "old city") was founded in the last quarter of the 17th century (1683-1684).

It was the seat of a Bek (local Governor) under the rule of the Bukharan Manghit dynasty. In 1868, following the fall of Samarkand to the Russians and the annexation of the Upper Zeravshan Valley from Bukhara, it became the border town between Russian Turkestan and the Bukharan Emirate, and the center of a district. In 1924 both entities were dissolved by the Soviet regime, and Katta-Kurgan was incorporated in the new Uzbek SSR. It is currently the second largest city in Samarkand Region.

== Sources and further reading ==
- Ф.Ф. Поспелов "Материалы к Истории Самаркандской Области" Справочная Книга Самаркандской Области Выпуск X (Самарканд) (1912), pp 108–111
- В.В. Бартольд Работы по Исторической Географии (Москва) (2002) pp 197–8, pp 287–8
