= Jomboy, Uzbekistan =

Jomboy Жомбой (Uzbek)
- City
- Location in Uzbekistan
- Coordinates: 39°41′56″N 67°5′36″E
- Country: Uzbekistan
- Region: Samarqand Region
- District: Jomboy District

Population (2016)
  - Total: 17,400
- Time zone: UTC+5 (UZT)

Jomboy (Uzbek: Жомбой, Jomboy) is a city in Samarqand Region, Uzbekistan. It is the capital of Jomboy District. The town population was 11,308 people in the year 1989, and 17,400 in 2016.
