= Urgut =

Town in Samarqand Region, Uzbekistan

Urgut Urgut / Ургут
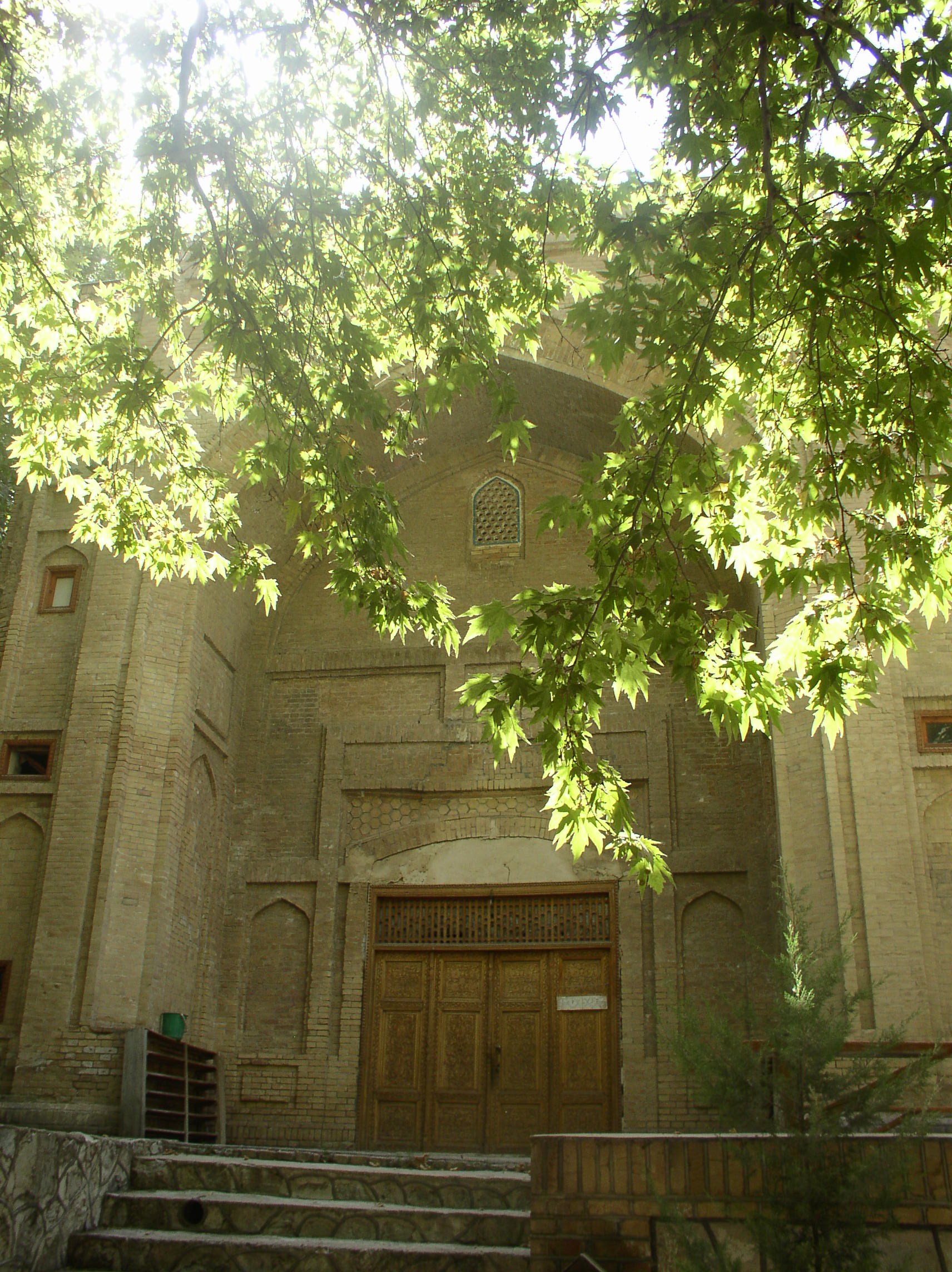

- Location in Uzbekistan
- Coordinates: 39°24′N 67°15′E
- Country: Uzbekistan
- Region: Samarqand Region
- District: Urgut District

Population (2016)
  - Total: 65,300
- Area code: (+998) 366

Urgut (Uzbek: Urgut / Ургут) is a city in the Samarqand Region of Uzbekistan and the capital of Urgut District. As of 2016, its population was 65,300. It is known for the grove of plane trees, some of which are more than 1000 years old. Urgut is located in a mountainous area.

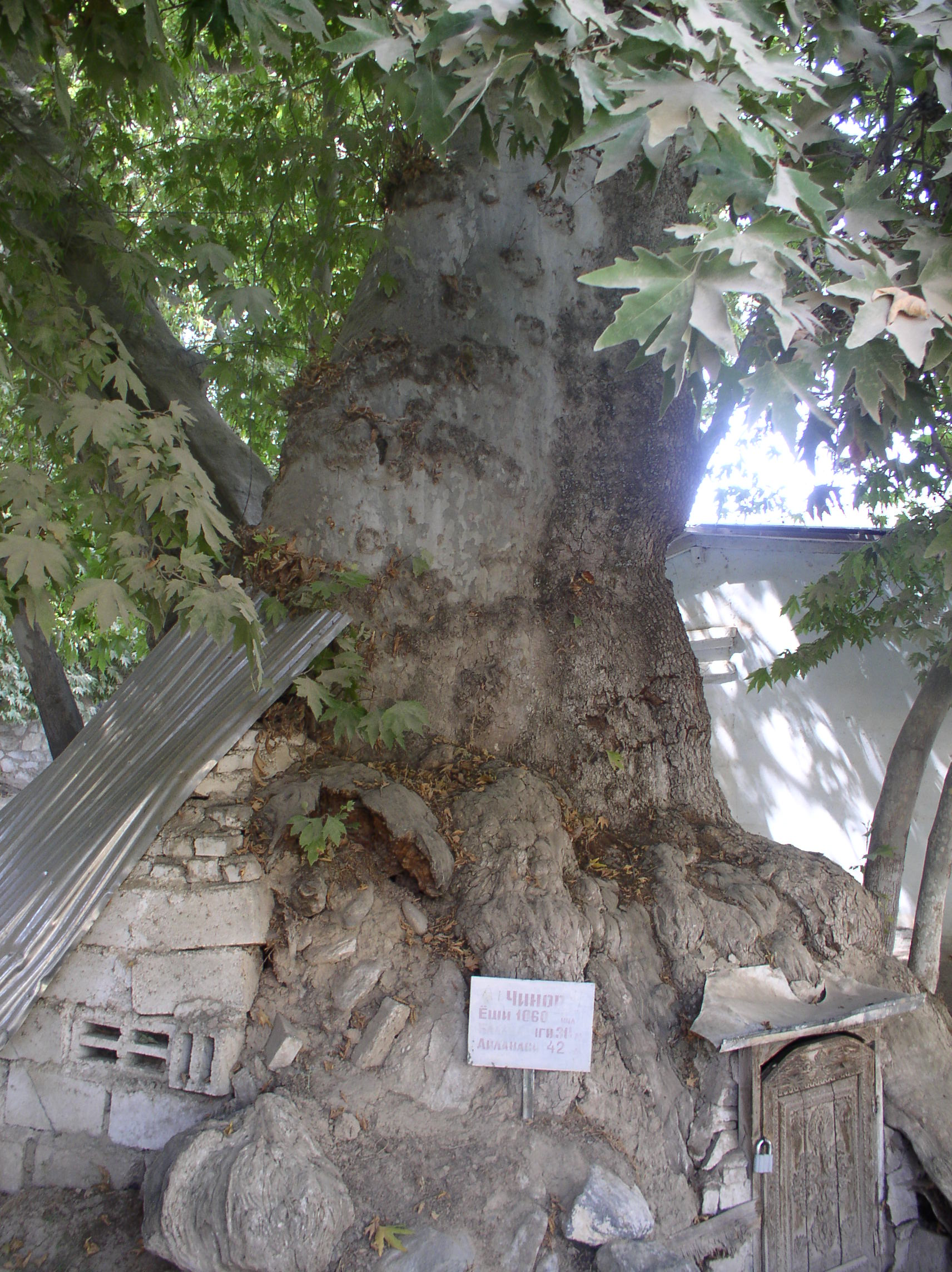
1060-year old plane tree with a cave under its roots

The people in Urgut are a subgroup of ethnic Uzbeks. There are almost 500,000 people who describe themselves as from Urgut. The majority of the population speaks Uzbek.

Urguti people are involved in mercantile activities and agriculture. In the town, craftsmanship is also a major activity and has been preserved through centuries.

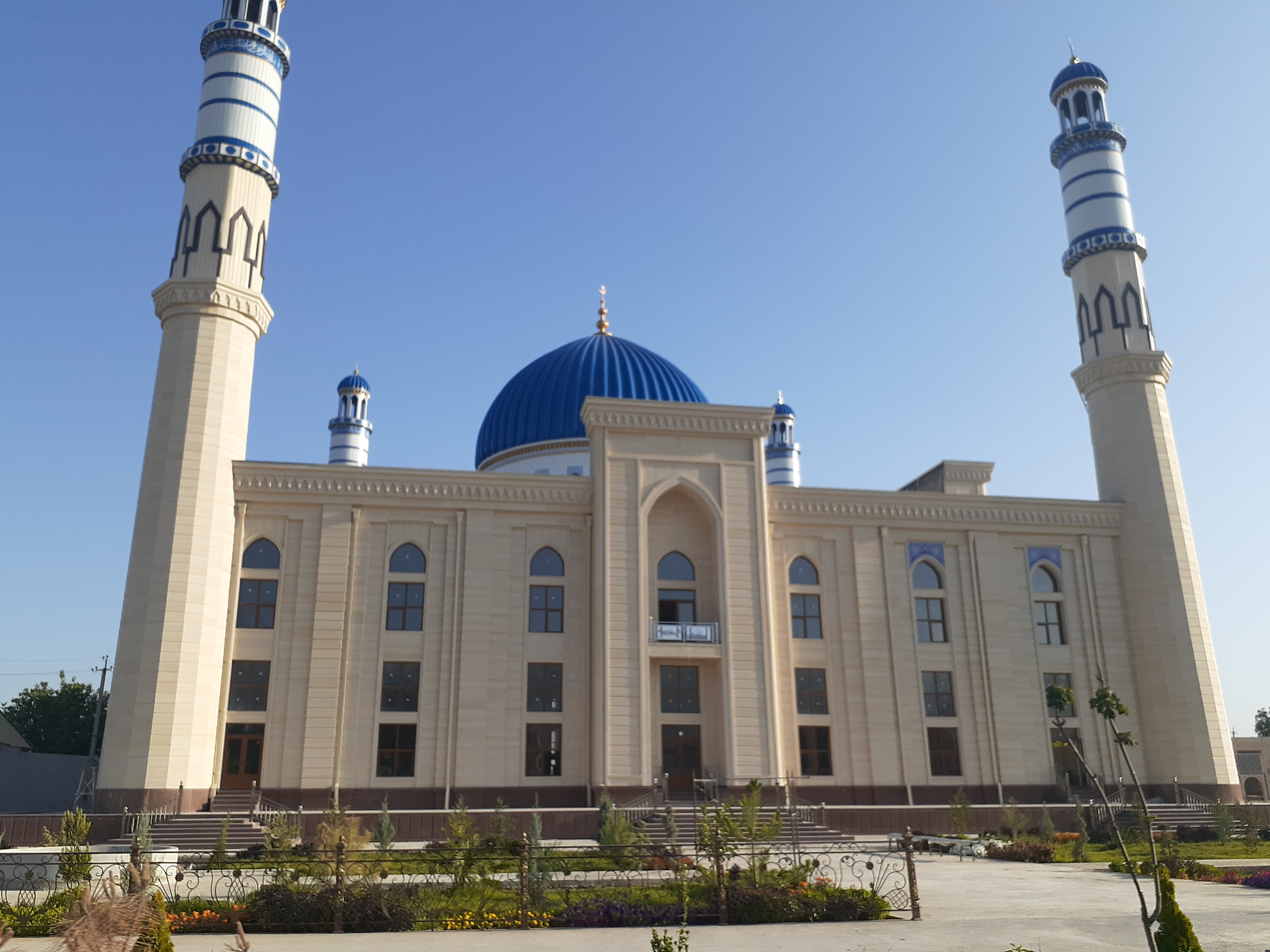
Mosque in the city of Urgut

Urgut's biggest market has varied and relatively inexpensive merchandise, even attracting folks from Samarkand, the capital of the Region.

Recent years, Urgut has been attracting foreign visitors due to its gorgeous mountains, ancient Chorchinor garden and the famous Urgut bazaar.
