= Jomboy District =

Coordinates: 39°42′00″N 67°05′24″E

- District
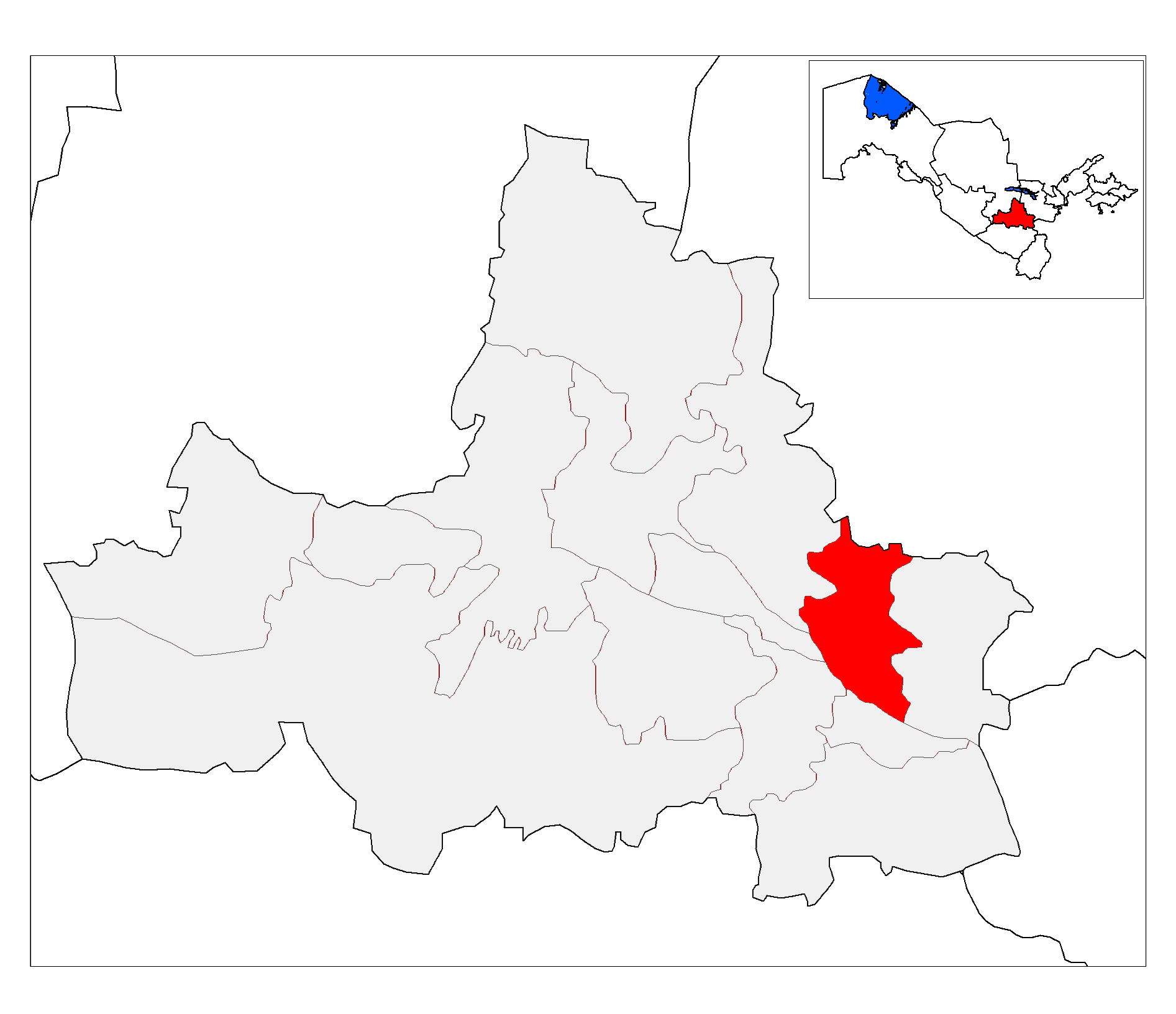
- Country: Uzbekistan
- Region: Samarqand Region
- Capital: Jomboy

Area
  - Total: 550 km^{2} (210 sq mi)

Population (2021)
  - Total: 176,000
  - Density: 320/km^{2} (830/sq mi)
- Time zone: UTC+5 (UZT)

Jomboy District is a district of Samarqand Region in Uzbekistan. Its capital is Jomboy. It has an area of 550 km^{2} (210 sq mi) and its population is 176,000 (2021 est.).

The district consists of one city (Jomboy), 5 urban-type settlements (Dehqonobod, Eski Jomboy, Xoʻja, Gʻazira, Kattaqishloq) and 8 rural communities.

== History and culture ==
In 1502, when Shaibani Khan was returning from Bukhara to Samarkand, he built a bridge of 7 arches on the Zarafshan river crossing from Jomboy. Over time, the arches were damaged, and in the 40s of the 19th century, 3 arches remained intact. Now. only one arch of the bridge has been preserved. In 1899, a railway was built through Jomboy.

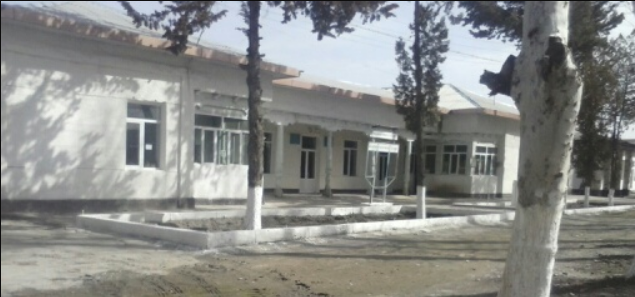
Jomboy House of Culture

Cultural life is somewhat developed in the district. People such as Ahmad Azam, Zoir Mirzayev (the current governor of the Tashkent Region), and Quddus Azam are from Jomboy.

There are 4 general education schools, a college of domestic service, a vocational lyceum, a scientific research institute of Acrology and Parasitology, 2 libraries, a house of culture, and a museum of local history. A symbolic gate has been installed at the entrance to the city.

== Economy ==
The district produces some quantity of cotton. There has also been evidence of basket-weaving among both men and women, though women have been handicapped by having to also perform a greater share of household chores.
