= Nurobod District, Uzbekistan =

Coordinates: 39.609391°N 66.287727°E

Nurobod District
- District
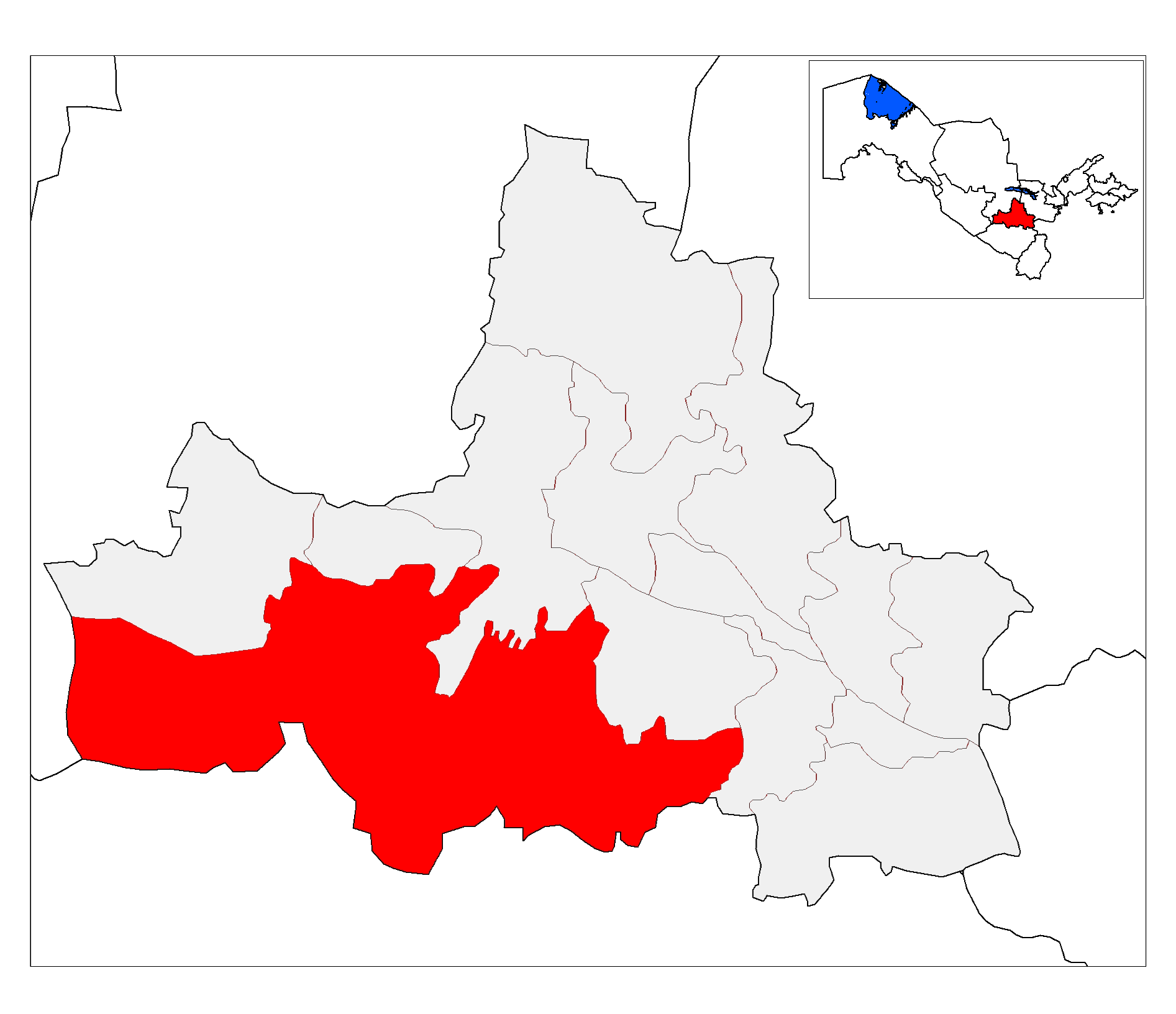
- Country: Uzbekistan
- Region: Samarqand Region
- Capital: Nurobod

Area
  - Total: 4,860 km^{2} (1,880 sq mi)

Population (2021)
  - Total: 152,700
  - Density: 31.4/km^{2} (81.4/sq mi)
- Time zone: UTC+5 (UZT)

Nurobod District is a district of Samarqand Region in Uzbekistan. The capital lies at the city Nurobod. It has an area of 4,860 km^{2} (1,880 sq mi) and its population is 152,700 (2021 est.).

The district consists of one city (Nurobod), one urban-type settlement (Nurbuloq) and 7 rural communities (Jom, Jarquduq, Nurbuloq, Tim, Sazogʻon, Ulus, Tutli).
