= Kattakurgan District =

Coordinates: 39°54′00″N 66°15′36″E

- District
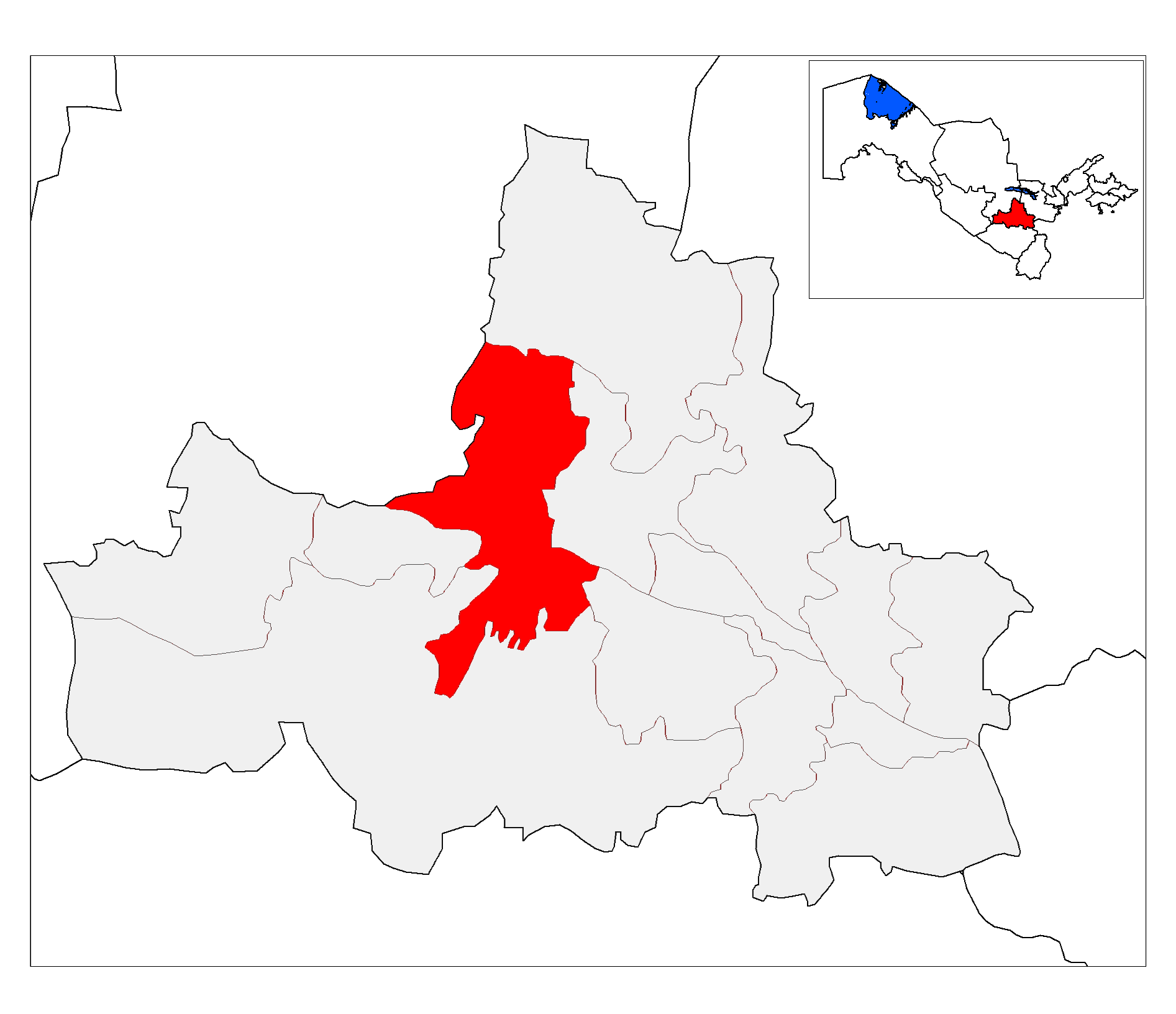
- Country: Uzbekistan
- Region: Samarqand Region
- Capital: Payshanba

Area
  - Total: 1,390 km^{2} (540 sq mi)

Population (2021)
  - Total: 276,700
  - Density: 199/km^{2} (516/sq mi)
- Time zone: UTC+5 (UZT)

Kattakurgan District (Uzbek: Kattaqoʻrgʻon tumani) is a district of Samarqand Region in Uzbekistan. The capital lies at the town Payshanba. It has an area of 1,390 km^{2} (540 sq mi) and its population is 276,700 (2021 est.).

The district consists of 8 urban-type settlements (Payshanba, Suv hovuzi, Mundiyon, Polvontepa, Qoradaryo, Vayrat, Yangiqoʻrgʻoncha, Kattaming) and 11 rural communities.
