= Samarkand Region =

Region of Uzbekistan

Samarkand Region Самарқанд вилояти / Samarqand viloyati
- Region
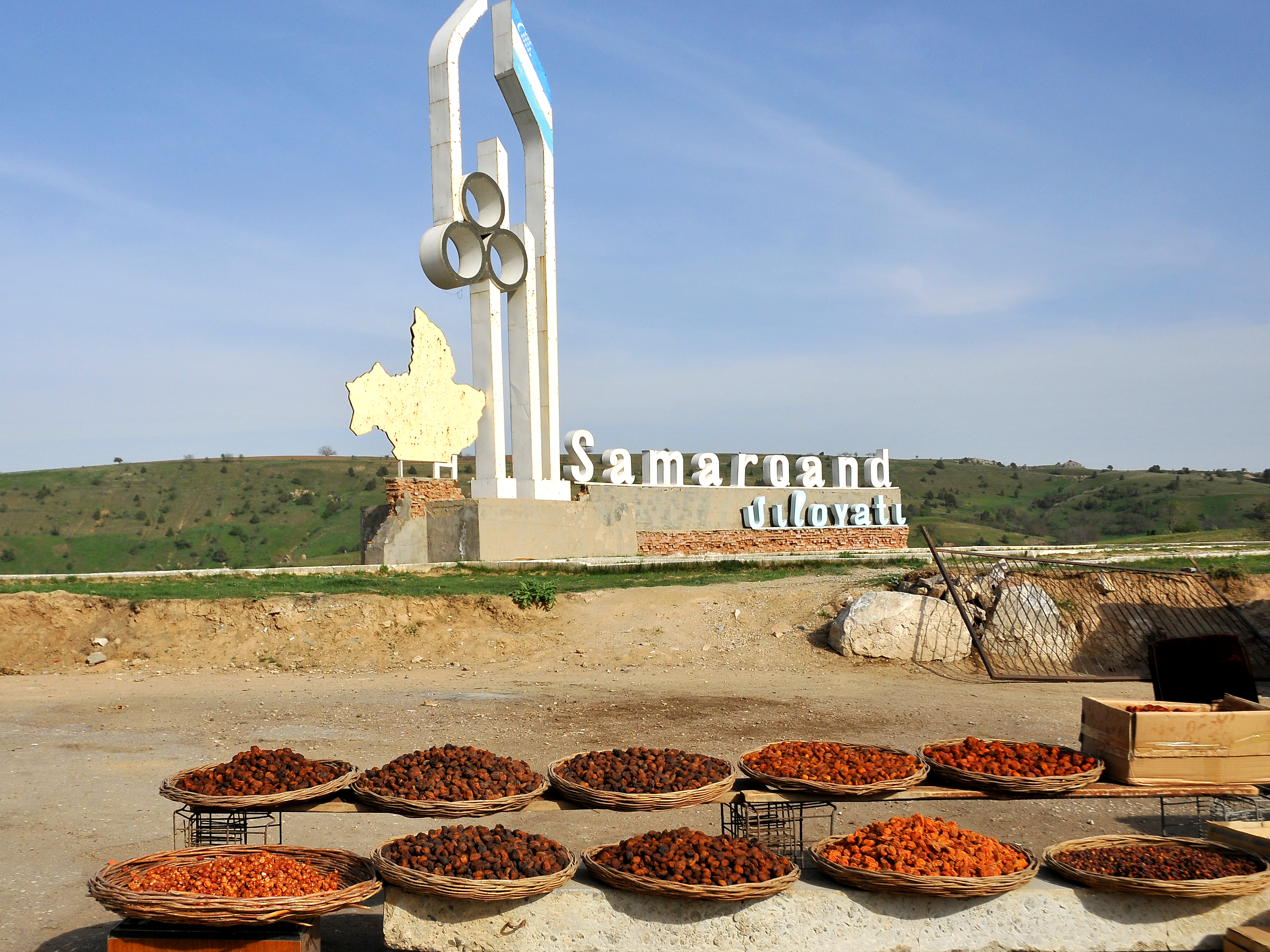
- 'Welcome to Samarkand'

- Samarkand in Uzbekistan
- Coordinates: 39°50′N 66°15′E
- Country: Uzbekistan
- Established: 1938
- Capital: Samarkand

Government
  - Hokim: Adiz Muzaffarovich Boboyev

Area
  - Total: 16,773 km^{2} (6,476 sq mi)
- Elevation: 577 m (1,893 ft)

Population (2022)
  - Total: 4,031,324
  - Density: 240.35/km^{2} (622.49/sq mi)
- Time zone: UTC+5 (East)
  - Summer (DST): UTC+5 (not observed)
- ISO 3166 code: UZ-SA
- Districts: 14
- Cities: 11
- Website: www.samarkand.uz

Samarkand Region (Note: Uzbek: Самарқанд вилояти, romanized: Samarqand viloyati, IPA: [samarˈqand ʋɪ̆lɔˌjæˈtʰɪ̆]; Tajik: вилояти Самарқанд, romanized: viloyati Samarqand) (Note: Formerly called Samarkand Oblast (from Russian Самаркандская область).) is the most populous region of Uzbekistan. It is located in the center of the country in the basin of the Zarafshan River. It borders Tajikistan, Navoiy Region, Jizzakh Region and Qashqadaryo Region. It covers an area of 16,773 km^{2}. The population is estimated to be around 4,031,324, with some 63% living in rural areas (as of 2022).

Samarkand Region was established on 15 January 1938, and is divided into 14 administrative districts and two district-level cities. The capital is Samarkand (pop. ≈551,700 as of 2021). Other major towns include Bulungʻur, Juma, Ishtixon, Kattakurgan, Urgut, and Oqtosh.

The climate is a typically arid continental climate.

Samarkand is the second-largest center for economy, science, and culture in Uzbekistan, after Tashkent. The region's UNESCO World Heritage Site architectural monuments make Samarkand the largest center for international tourism in the country. Samarkand Region also has significant natural resources, including construction materials such as marble, granite, limestone, carbonate, and chalk. The region's major agricultural activities are cotton and cereal growing, winemaking and sericulture. Metal processing (spare parts for automobiles and combines), food processing, textiles, and ceramics are the area's most active industries.

The region has a well-developed transport infrastructure, with over 400 km of railways and 4,100 km of surfaced roads. The telecommunication infrastructure is also well developed.

== Administrative divisions ==
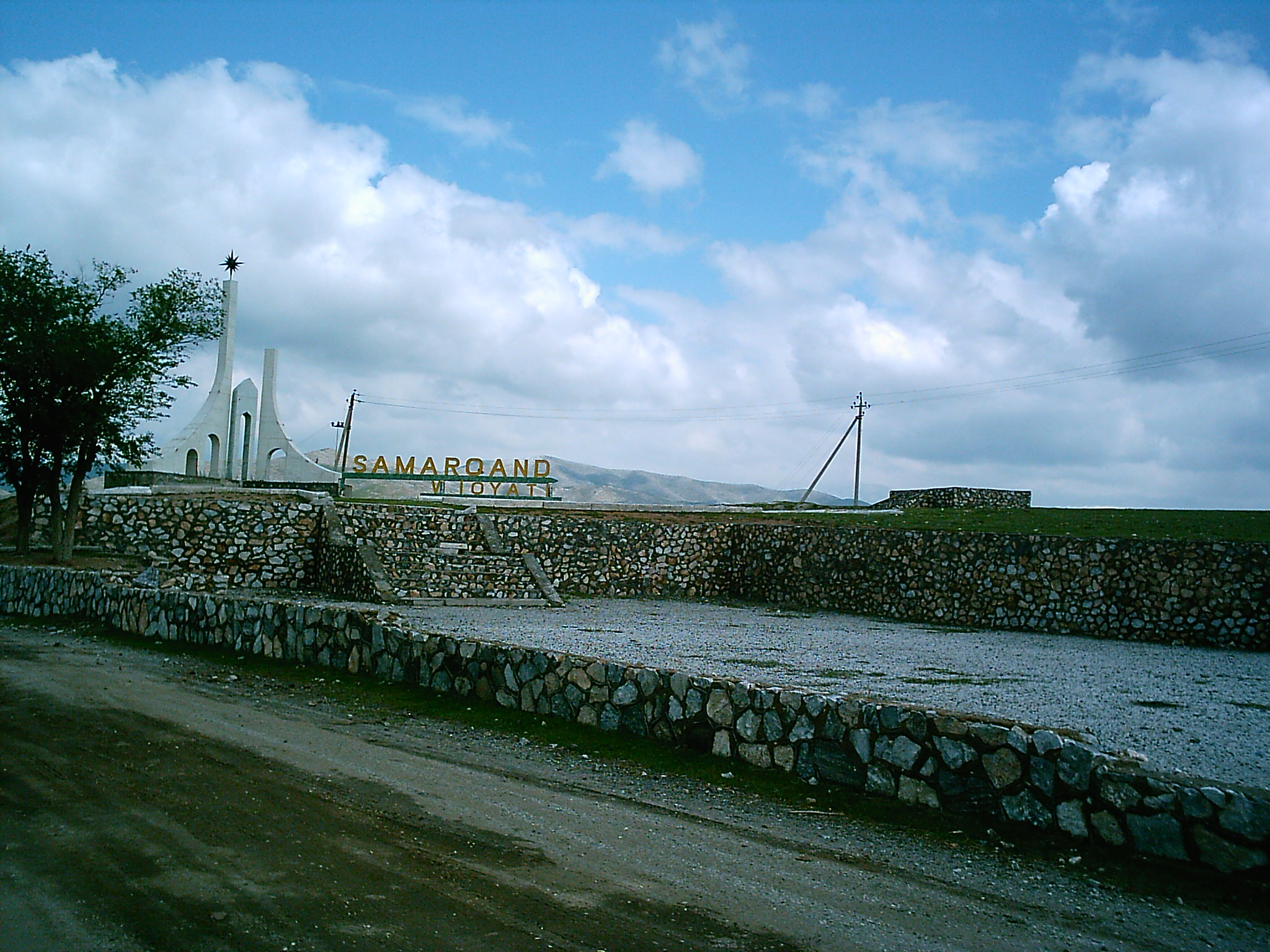
At the entrance to the Samarkand Region from the Qashqadaryo Region

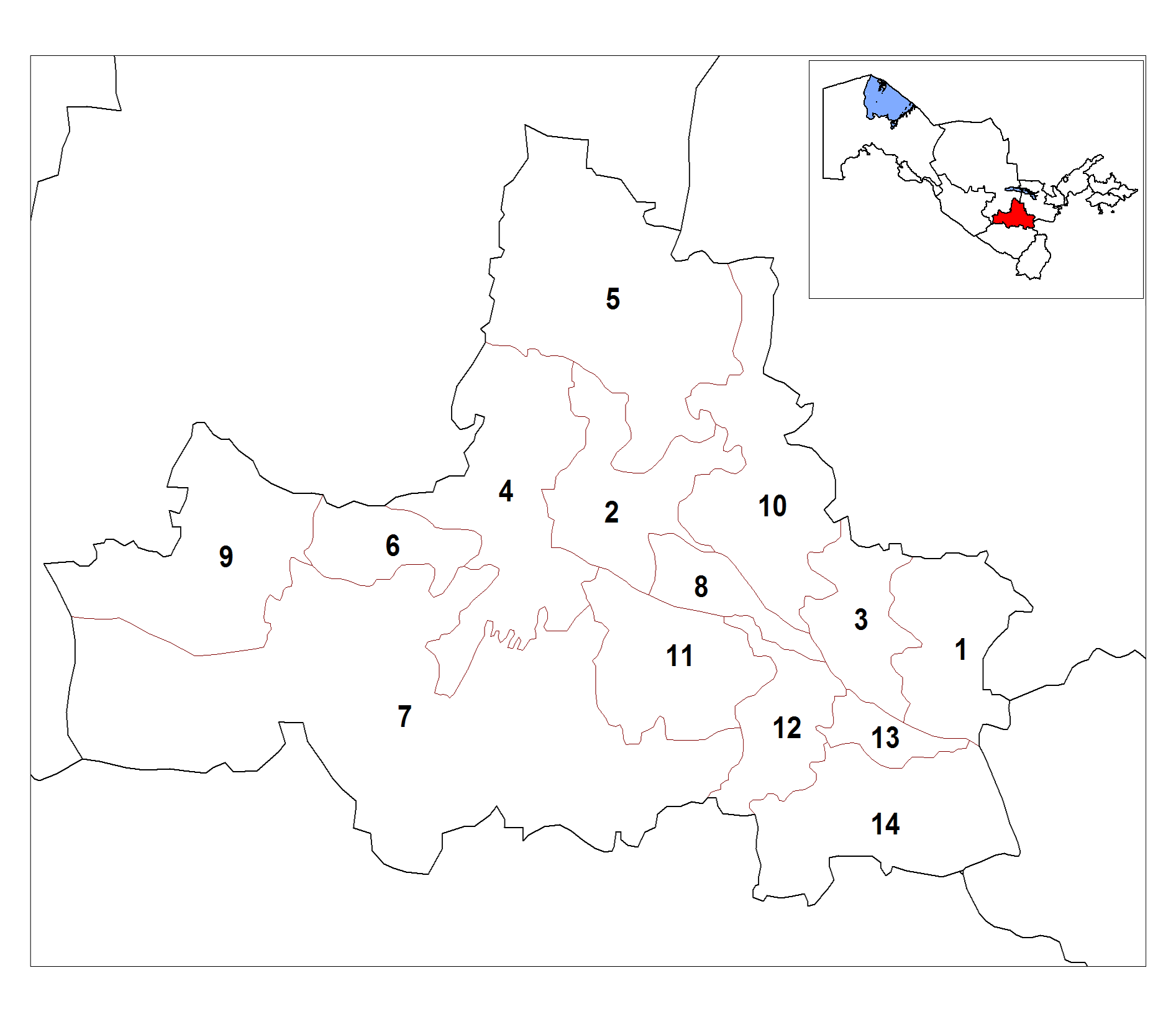
Districts of Samarkand Region

The Samarkand Region consists of 14 districts (listed below) and two district-level cities: Samarkand (Samarqand) and Kattakurgan (Kattaqoʻrgʻon).

| | District name | District capital |
|---|---|---|
| 1 | Bulungʻur District | Bulungʻur |
| 2 | Ishtixon District | Ishtixon |
| 3 | Jomboy District | Jomboy |
| 4 | Kattakurgan District | Payshanba |
| 5 | Qoʻshrabot District | Qoʻshrabot |
| 6 | Narpay District | Oqtosh |
| 7 | Nurobod District | Nurobod |
| 8 | Oqdaryo District | Loyish |
| 9 | Paxtachi District | Ziyovuddin |
| 10 | Payariq District | Payariq |
| 11 | Pastdargʻom District | Juma |
| 12 | Samarkand District | Gulobod |
| 13 | Toyloq District | Toyloq |
| 14 | Urgut District | Urgut |

There are 11 cities (Samarkand, Kattakurgan, Bulungʻur, Jomboy, Ishtixon, Oqtosh, Payariq, Chelak, Juma, Nurobod, Urgut) and 88 urban-type settlements in the Samarkand Region.

== See also ==
- List of Hokims of the Samarkand Region
