= Sharof Rashidov District =

Coordinates: 40.1121°N 67.8396°E

Sharof Rashidov
- District
- Sharof Rashidov tumani
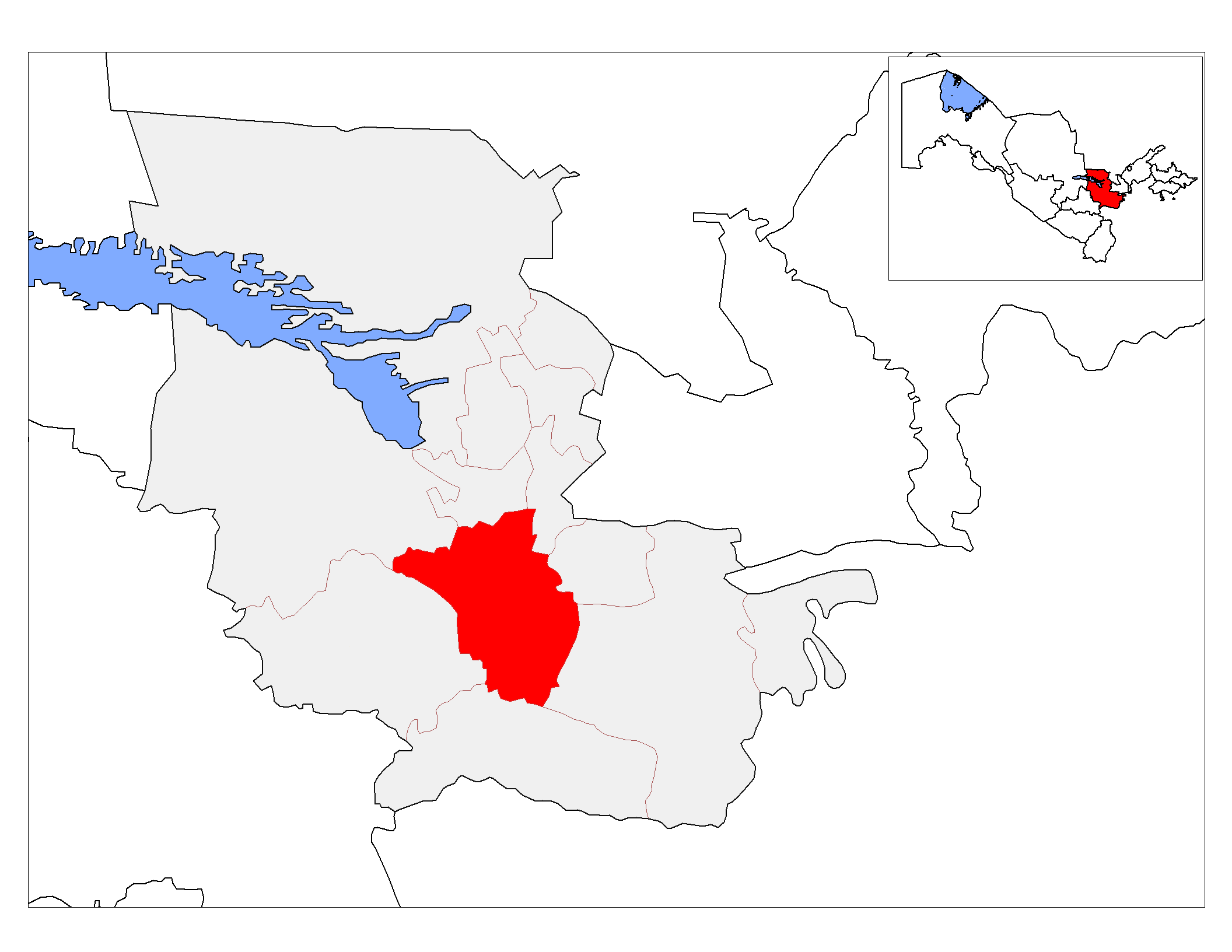
- Country: Uzbekistan
- Region: Jizzakh Region
- Capital: Uchtepa
- Established: 1926
- district governor: Sharof Rashidov District Administration

Government
  - Type: Hokim
  - district governor: Ashurov Asilbek Rahmonovich

Area
  - Total: 1,320 km^{2} (510 sq mi)

Population (2020)
  - Total: 223,100
  - Density: 169/km^{2} (438/sq mi)
- Time zone: UTC+5 (UZT)
- Postal code: 100131

== Sharof Rashidov District ==
Sharof Rashidov District (formerly Jizzakh District) is one of the main administrative-territorial units of Jizzakh Region, Uzbekistan. It was established on 29 September 1926. The total area of the district is 1,440 km², and its population was 247,300 as of 2025. The administrative center is the city of Uchtepa. Since 22 August 2025, the hokim district governor) has been Asilbek Ashurov Rahmonovich. The district consists of 48 citizens’ assemblies of mahallas.

== Geography ==
Sharof Rashidov District is located in the central part of Jizzakh Region. It borders Forish District to the north, Zafarobod District, to the northeast, Paxtakor District to the east, Gʻallaorol District to the south, Zarbdor District to the southwest, and Zomin District and Baxmal District to the west. The relief consists of plains, foothills, and mountainous areas. The Qo‘ytosh Mountains are located in the west and the Molguzar mountain range in the south. The climate is sharply continental, with average temperatures of 28–30 °C in July and −2 to −4 °C in January. The average annual precipitation is about 425 mm, and the vegetation period lasts 210–215 days. The district is irrigated by the Sangzor River and the Tuyatortar Canal originating from the Zarafshan River. Ravotsoy and several small streams also flow through the district.

== Nature ==
Soils are mainly gray and light gray soils. Natural vegetation includes camelthorn, wormwood, reeds, tamarisk, and other steppe plants. Spring pastures are widely used in foothill areas. Wildlife includes foxes, wolves, jackals, hares, reptiles, and various bird species such as pigeons, crows, mynas, sparrows, and kites.

== Population ==
The population is predominantly Uzbek, with minorities including Kazakhs, Tajiks, Russians, Kyrgyz, and others. The average population density is about 5,000 people per km².

== Economy ==
The district’s economy is primarily based on agriculture, especially cotton growing. Grain farming, horticulture, and vegetable cultivation are also developed. The total cultivated area is 41.1 thousand hectares, including 22 thousand hectares of grain crops and 12 thousand hectares of cotton. Livestock farming is also significant, with cattle, sheep, goats, and horses raised in local farms. Industrial enterprises include “Jizzax don mahsulotlari” joint-stock company, Uchtepa bread combine, and product packaging enterprises.

== Infrastructure ==
The district has 52 general education schools, vocational colleges, music schools, libraries, a museum, stadiums, rural hospitals, medical points, and other social infrastructure facilities. The district newspaper “Jizzax ovozi” is also published.
