= Samandar Kukanov =

Uzbek politician

Samandar Kukanov (in Uzbek Samandar Qoʻqonov, in Russian Самандар Куканов), born in 1945 in Forish District, Jizzakh Region, Uzbekistan, was a politician from the Erk Democratic Party of Uzbekistan. He was a member of parliament from 1989 to June 1992, when he was arrested. In 1993, after a year of being held incommunicado, he was condemned to 20 years of prison, on charges of financial crimes. The sentence was extended at least once, thus becoming one of the world's longest-held political prisoners. Despite his sentence being extended for three more years in October 2016, he ended up being released in late November 2016, at the age of 72, after spending 23 years in prison.
