= Zaamin National Park =

National park in Uzbekistan

- IUCN category II (national park)
- Location within Uzbekistan
- Location: Jizzakh Region, Uzbekistan
- Nearest city: Zomin
- Coordinates: 39.613°N 68.501°E
- Area: 156 km^{2} (60 mi^{2})
- Established: 1926

Zaamin National Park (Uzbek: Zomin togʻ-oʻrmon davlat qoʻriqxonasi) in Jizzakh Region is the oldest nature reserve in Uzbekistan. It was created in 1926 as the Guralash Nature Preserve, and is located on the northern side of the Turkestan Range. The Zaamin National Park is frequently referred to as the Switzerland of Uzbekistan because of its lush surroundings and beauty.

== Geography ==
The Zaamin National Park covers 156 km2 (60 sq mi) of protected mountain landscapes in the Zomin District of Jizzakh Region in the east of Uzbekistan. It includes the valleys of the Aldashmansoy, Baikungur, Gurulash, and Kulsoy rivers, which provide ample water for local flora and fauna in what is otherwise a dry continental climate. There is also a large, man-made reservoir close to the park entrance.

The lowest parts of Zaamin National Park are in the Guralash Valley, at around 1,700 metres (5,600 ft). The highest point within the park is the top of Guralash Peak 3,571 metres (11,716 ft), though several mountains are visible nearby.

The ancient city of Tugunbulak is located near the park.

== Flora and Fauna ==
Ecosystems within the Zaamin National Park vary from juniper forests to alpine meadows. More than 700 species of plants have been recorded here, including 30 types of medicinal herbs. In springtime the red tulips and white acacias add bright colour to the mountain slopes; and in the autumn months, the leaves on the hazelnut and birch trees turn gold. There are also large numbers of plane trees.

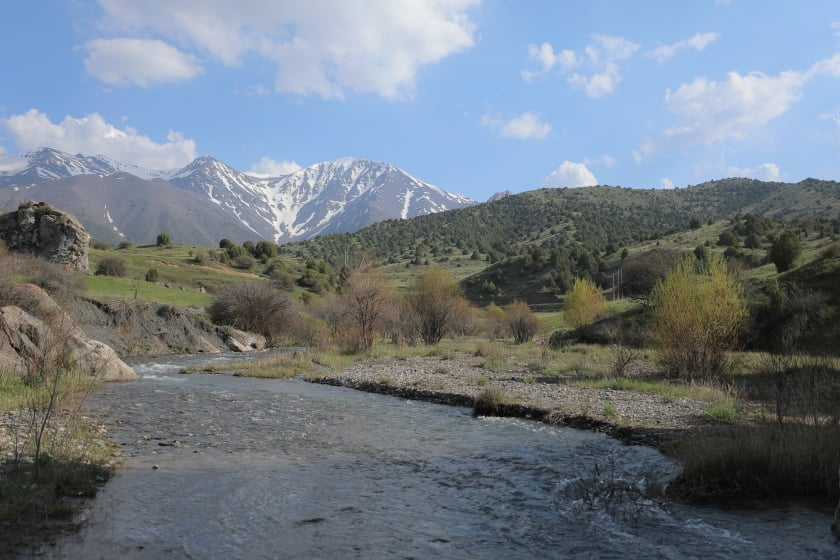
Zaamin National Park

Researchers have recorded 40 species of mammals and 150 species of birds in Zaamin. These include many rare and endangered species listed in the Red Book of Uzbekistan. Snow leopard, Asiatic black bear, and Turkestan lynx have all been seen here, and the park is also an important nesting site for black stork. Ducks, geese, pelicans, and grey herons all migrate to Zaamin in the spring. There are bearded vulture in the Chortangi Gorge.

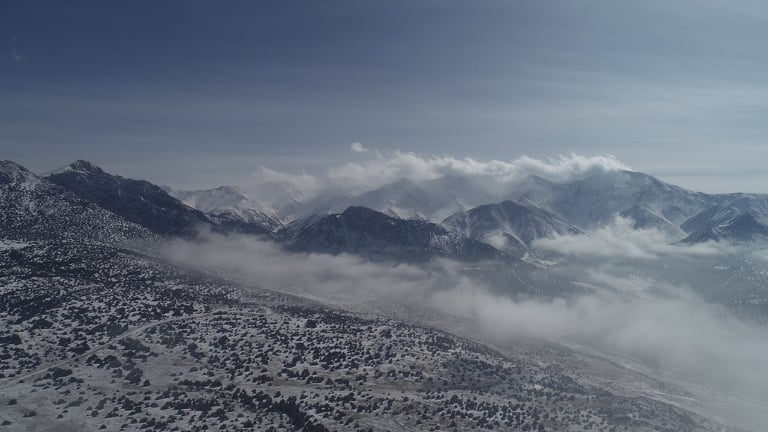
Zaamin National Park

== Activities ==
A large, futuristic sanatorium was built on the edge of Zaamin National Park in the 1970s and it now houses the park's visitor centre as well as guest accommodation. There is a local market here selling cheese and herbs, and also several cafes. The sanatorium is used as a base by mountaineers climbing Shaukartau and Tokalichuk.

There has been a beginner's ski slope in Zaamin since 2012, and the area is currently being developed into a modern ski resort with gondola and chair lifts. A golf course is also under construction.

Other popular activities in the park include hiking, picnicking, and bird watching. There are several children's camps in the area and it is a popular holiday spot for families.

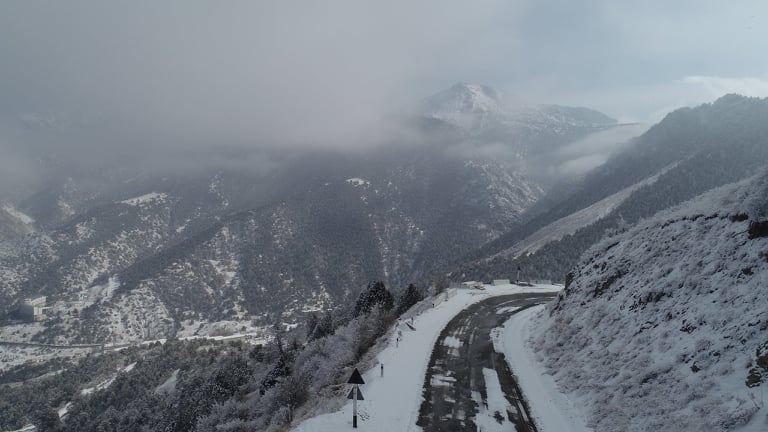
Zaamin National Park during winter

== Gallery ==
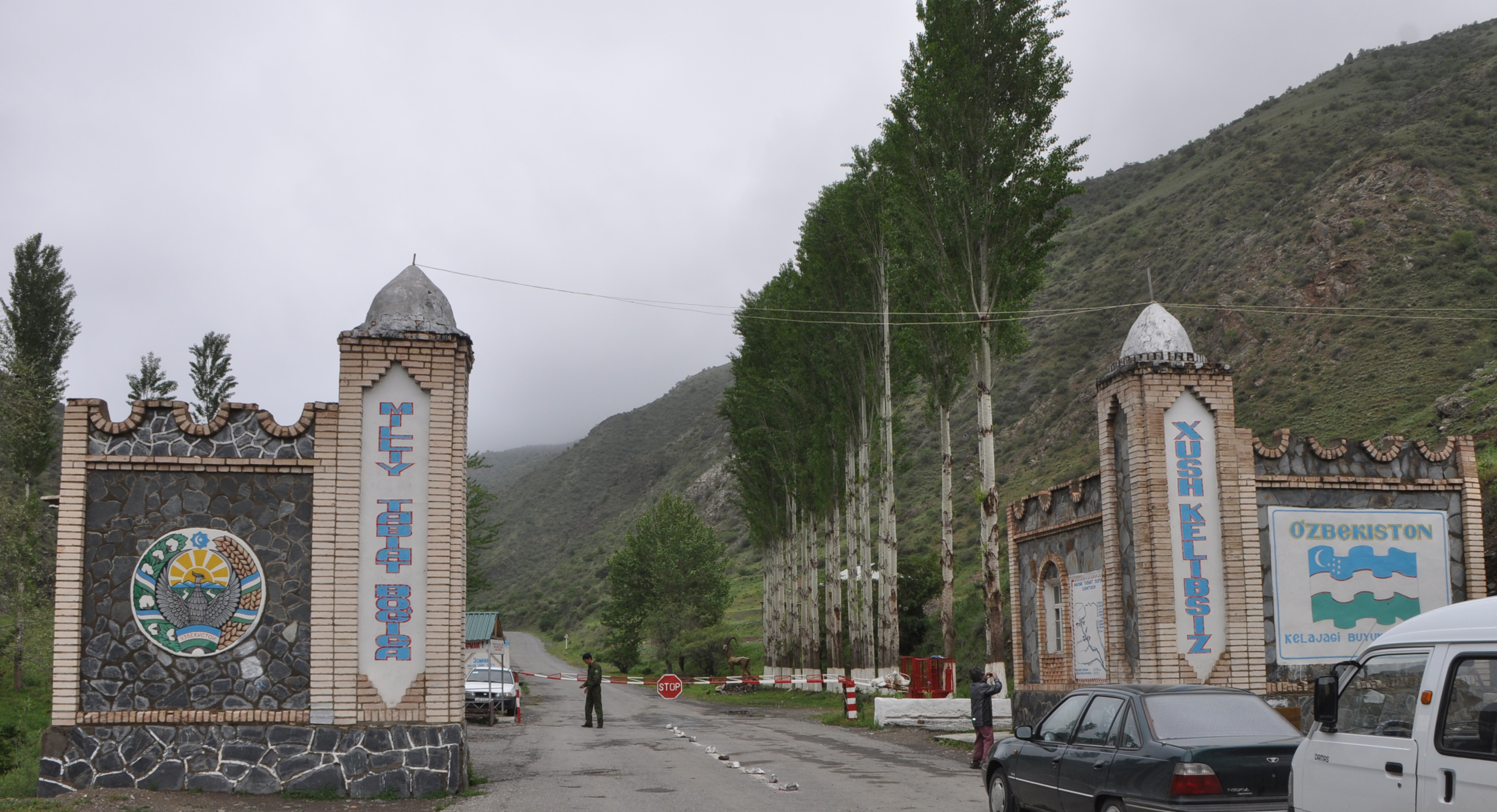
The entrance to Zaamin National Park, Uzbekistan
