= Marjonbuloq =

- urban-type settlement
- Location in Uzbekistan
- Coordinates: 39°56′20″N 67°27′20″E
- Country: Uzbekistan
- Region: Jizzakh Region
- District: Gʻallaorol District
- Urban-type settlement: 1983

Population (2016)
  - Total: 5,700
- Time zone: UTC+5 (UZT)

Marjonbuloq (Uzbek: Marjonbuloq / Маржонбулоқ, Russian: Марджанбулак) is an urban-type settlement in Gʻallaorol District, Jizzakh Region, Uzbekistan. The town's population was 3,079 people in 1989, and 5,700 in 2016.
