= Uchquloch =

- urban-type settlement
- Location in Uzbekistan
- Coordinates: 40°30′27″N 67°20′46″E
- Country: Uzbekistan
- Region: Jizzakh Region
- District: Forish District
- Urban-type settlement: 1983

Population (1989)
  - Total: 3,767
- Time zone: UTC+5 (UZT)

Uchquloch (Uzbek: Uchquloch/Учқулоч, Russian: Учкулач) is an urban-type settlement in Jizzakh Region, Uzbekistan. It is part of Forish District. The town population in 1989 was 3767 people.
