= Sayyod =

- Village
- Location within Uzbekistan
- Coordinates: 40°21′07.4″N 67°15′50.9″E
- Country: Uzbekistan
- Region: Jizzakh Region
- District: Forish District
- Demonym: Sayyodian

Sayyod (Uzbek: Sayyod) is a small village in Forish District, Jizzakh Region, Uzbekistan.
