= Tugunbulak =

Ancient city in Uzbekistan

- Location within Uzbekistan
- 39°42′11.67″N 68°15′56.62″E
- Type: city
- Location: in Bakhmal District and near Zaamin National Park, Uzbekistan
- Region: Turkestan Range

History
- Built: 6th century
- Abandoned: 10th century

Site notes
- Elevation: 2,000–2,200 m (6,600–7,200 ft)
- Area: 120 hectares (300 acres)
- Excavation dates: 2022
- Archaeologists: Michael Frachetti; Farhod Maksudov
- Discovered: 2015

Tugunbulak was a medieval city in the Turkestan Range, located in what is now southeastern Uzbekistan, in the Bakhmal District, close to the village of Guralash and near Zaamin National Park. It and the nearby contemporary site of Tashbulak (39°41′46.67″N 68°19′14.83″E) were occupied from the 6th to the late 10th centuries CE. Situated at altitudes of 2,000–2,200 m (6,600–7,200 ft), the city was a center of iron mining and production, through which it was connected to the Silk Road trading networks. Tugunbulak's remains occupy an area of approximately 120 ha (300 acres), making it medieval Central Asia's largest known high-altitude urban center. It contained extensive walls, terraces, and fortifications.

Tugunbulak sits approximately 5 km (3 miles) from another archaeological site known as Tashbulak. The original names of both settlements are as yet unknown. Tashbulak had been discovered by a team including American archaeologist Michael Frachetti and Uzbek archaeologist Farhod Maksudov in 2011. While investigating pottery sherds at the Tashbulak site in 2015, Frachetti met a forestry inspector living in the surrounding area, who informed him that he had seen similar ceramics in his backyard. Upon investigating his farmstead, Frachetti discovered the inspector's house was built on the remains of a citadel. Excavations and Lidar scans were made at the site in 2022, revealing the large urban center. After further fieldwork at the site the following year, the discovery was published in Nature in October 2024.
