= Boʻston, Jizzakh Region =

Boʻston
- urban-type settlement
- Location in Uzbekistan
- Coordinates: 40°06′00″N 68°02′35″E
- Country: Uzbekistan
- Region: Jizzakh Region
- District: Zarbdor District
- Urban-type settlement status: 1979

Population (1989)
  - Total: 5,684
- Time zone: UTC+5 (UZT)

Boʻston (Uzbek: Boʻston/Бўстон, Russian: Бустан) is an urban-type settlement in the Jizzakh Region, Uzbekistan. It is a part of Zarbdor District.

== Census ==
The population of the town in 1989 was 5,684.
