= Qoʻytosh =

- urban-type settlement
- Location in Uzbekistan
- Coordinates: 40°12′53″N 67°20′10″E
- Country: Uzbekistan
- Region: Jizzakh Region
- District: Gʻallaorol District
- Urban-type settlement status: 1942

Population (1989)
  - Total: 5,178
- Time zone: UTC+5 (UZT)

Qoʻytosh (Uzbek: Qoʻytosh/Қўйтош, Russian: Койташ) is an urban-type settlement in Gʻallaorol District, Jizzakh Region, Uzbekistan. The town population in 1989 was 5178 people.
