= Qurbonhoji =

- Village
- Location within Uzbekistan
- Coordinates: 40°21′41.0″N 67°20′19.1″E
- Country: Uzbekistan
- Region: Jizzakh Region
- District: Forish District

Qurbonhoji (Uzbek: Qurbonhoji / Қурбонҳожи) is a small village in Forish District, Jizzakh Region, Uzbekistan.
