= Sarmich =

- Location in Uzbekistan
- Coordinates: 39°54′N 68°52′E
- Country: Uzbekistan
- Region: Jizzakh Region
- District: Yangiobod District

Sarmich (Uzbek: Sarmich, Russian: Сармыч Sarmych) is a village in eastern Uzbekistan. It is located in Yangiobod District, Jizzakh Region.
