= 2004 Uzbekistan Cup =

Tournament details
- Country: Uzbekistan
- Dates: March – October 2004
- Teams: 36

Final positions
- Champions: Pakhtakor (6th title)
- Runners-up: Traktor
- Third place: Neftchi
- Fourth place: Mash'al

Tournament statistics
- Matches played: 41
- Goals scored: 132 (3.22 per match)

The 2004 Uzbekistan Cup (in Uzbek: Футбол бўйича 2004-йилги Ўзбекистон Кубоги) was a football tournament organized by Uzbekistan Football Federation, in which 36 clubs participated. Starting from the first round, the tournament was held in a knockout system.

== Preliminary round ==
Pairs	date	Notes
Pairs	24 March	Notes
Yangier — NBU-Asia	0:1	
Hisor (Shakhrisabz) — Popfen (Pop)	+:-	
Gʻallakor-Avtomobilchi (Gʻallaorol) — Toʻpalang (Sariosiyo)	2:2	Penalties. 5:3
Lokomotiv-2 (Tashkent) — Shaykhontokhur (Tashkent)	1:2	
FC AGMK (Olmaliq) — Vobkent	0:1	

== Round of 16 ==
Pairs	date	Notes
Pairs	30 March	Notes
Neftchi (Fergana) — Xorazm-2003 (Urgench)	2:0	
	27 April	
Vobkent — Gʻallakor-Avtomobilchi (Gʻallaorol)	0:0	Penalties. 4:3
	28 April	
Shaykhontokhur (Tashkent) — Shakhrikhan	5:1	
	29 April	
Nasaf (Qarshi) — Samarkand-Dinamo	5:1	
Sementchi (Quvasoy) — Surkhon (Termez)	2:1	
Lokomotiv (Tashkent) — Navbahor (Namangan)	2:1	
Guliston — Hazorasp	2:1	
NBU-Osiyo (Tashkent) — Qizilqum (Zarafshon)	1:2	
Sho‘rtan (Gʻuzor) — Buxoro	1:3	
Shoʻrchi-Lochin — Mashʼal (Mubarek)	0:8	
Hisor (Shakhrisabz) — Kimyogar (Chirchik)	2:1	
Metallurg (Bekabad) — Andijon	1:2	
Zarafshon (Navoi) — Soʻgʻdiyona (Jizzakh)	1:3	
Pakhtakor-2 (Tashkent) — Kosonsoy	2:0	
Kokand 1912 — Traktor (Tashkent)	-:+	
