= Gʻoliblar =

G‘oliblar
- urban-type settlement
- Location in Uzbekistan
- Coordinates: 40°29′43″N 67°52′40″E
- Country: Uzbekistan
- Region: Jizzakh Region
- District: Arnasoy District
- Urban-type settlement: 2009

Population (2016)
  - Total: 12,300
- Time zone: UTC+5 (UZT)

G‘oliblar (Uzbek: G‘oliblar / Ғолиблар) is an urban-type settlement in Jizzakh Region, Uzbekistan. It is the administrative center of Arnasoy District. The town population was 4,590 people in 1989, and 12,300 in 2016.
