= Uchtepa, Uzbekistan =

Uchtepa
- urban-type settlement
- Location in Uzbekistan
- Coordinates: 40°12′18″N 67°54′04″E
- Country: Uzbekistan
- Region: Jizzakh Region
- District: Sharof Rashidov District
- Urban-type settlement status: 2009

Population (2005)
  - Total: 10,110
- Time zone: UTC+5 (UZT)

Uchtepa (Uzbek: Uchtepa/Учтепа, Russian: Учтепа) is an urban-type settlement in Jizzakh Region, Uzbekistan. It is the administrative center of Sharof Rashidov District. The town population in 1989 was 4,824 people.
