= Zafarobod, Jizzakh Region =

Zafarobod
- urban-type settlement
- Location in Uzbekistan
- Coordinates: 40°23′09″N 67°49′06″E
- Country: Uzbekistan
- Region: Jizzakh Region
- District: Zafarobod District
- Urban-type settlement status: 1997

Population (2001)
  - Total: 4,000
- Time zone: UTC+5 (UZT)

Zafarobod (Uzbek: Zafarobod, Russian: Зафарабад, romanized: Zafarabad) is an urban-type settlement in Jizzakh Region, Uzbekistan. It is the administrative center of Zafarobod District.
