= Zarbdor =

- urban-type settlement
- Location in Uzbekistan
- Coordinates: 40°04′29″N 68°10′06″E
- Country: Uzbekistan
- Region: Jizzakh Region
- District: Zarbdor District
- Urban-type settlement status: 1990

Population (2002)
  - Total: 9,110
- Time zone: UTC+5 (UZT)

Zarbdor (Uzbek: Zarbdor/Зарбдор, Russian: Зарбдар, romanized: Zarbdar) is an urban-type settlement in Jizzakh Region, Uzbekistan. It is the seat of Zarbdor District.
