= Bogʻdon =

- urban-type settlement
- Location in Uzbekistan
- Coordinates: 40°25′07″N 67°10′46″E
- Country: Uzbekistan
- Region: Jizzakh Region
- District: Forish District
- Urban-type settlement status: 1978

Population (2003)
  - Total: 8,400
- Time zone: UTC+5 (UZT)

Bogʻdon (Uzbek: Bogʻdon/Боғдон, before 2014 Yangiqishloq, Russian: Янгикишлак, romanized: Yangikishlak) is an urban-type settlement in Jizzakh Region, Uzbekistan, and is the administrative center of Forish District. The town population in 1989 was 6,611 people.
