= Oʻsmat =

Oʻsmat Uzbek: Oʻsmat
- urban-type settlement
- Location in Uzbekistan
- Coordinates: 39°44′19″N 67°38′36″E
- Country: Uzbekistan
- Region: Jizzakh Region
- District: Baxmal District
- Urban-type settlement: 1990
- Elevation: 1,087 m (3,566 ft)

Population (2004)
  - Total: 10,500
- Time zone: UTC+5 (UZT)

Oʻsmat (Uzbek: Oʻsmat) is an urban-type settlement in Jizzakh Region, Uzbekistan. It is the administrative center of Baxmal District.

== Population ==
The town population in 1989 was 4,662 people.
