= Doʻstlik, Jizzakh Region =

Doʻstlik
- City
- Location in Uzbekistan
- Coordinates: 40°31′29″N 68°2′9″E
- Country: Uzbekistan
- Region: Jizzakh Region
- District: Doʻstlik District
- Town status: 1983

Population (2016)
  - Total: 18,300
- Time zone: UTC+5 (UZT)

Doʻstlik (Uzbek: Doʻstlik/Дўстлик, Russian: Дустлик) is a city in Jizzakh Region, Uzbekistan. It is the administrative center of Doʻstlik District. The town population was 11,903 people in 1989, and 18,300 in 2016.
