= Doʻstlik District =

Coordinates: 40.5257°N 68.0313°E

Doʻstlik
- District
- Doʻstlik tumani
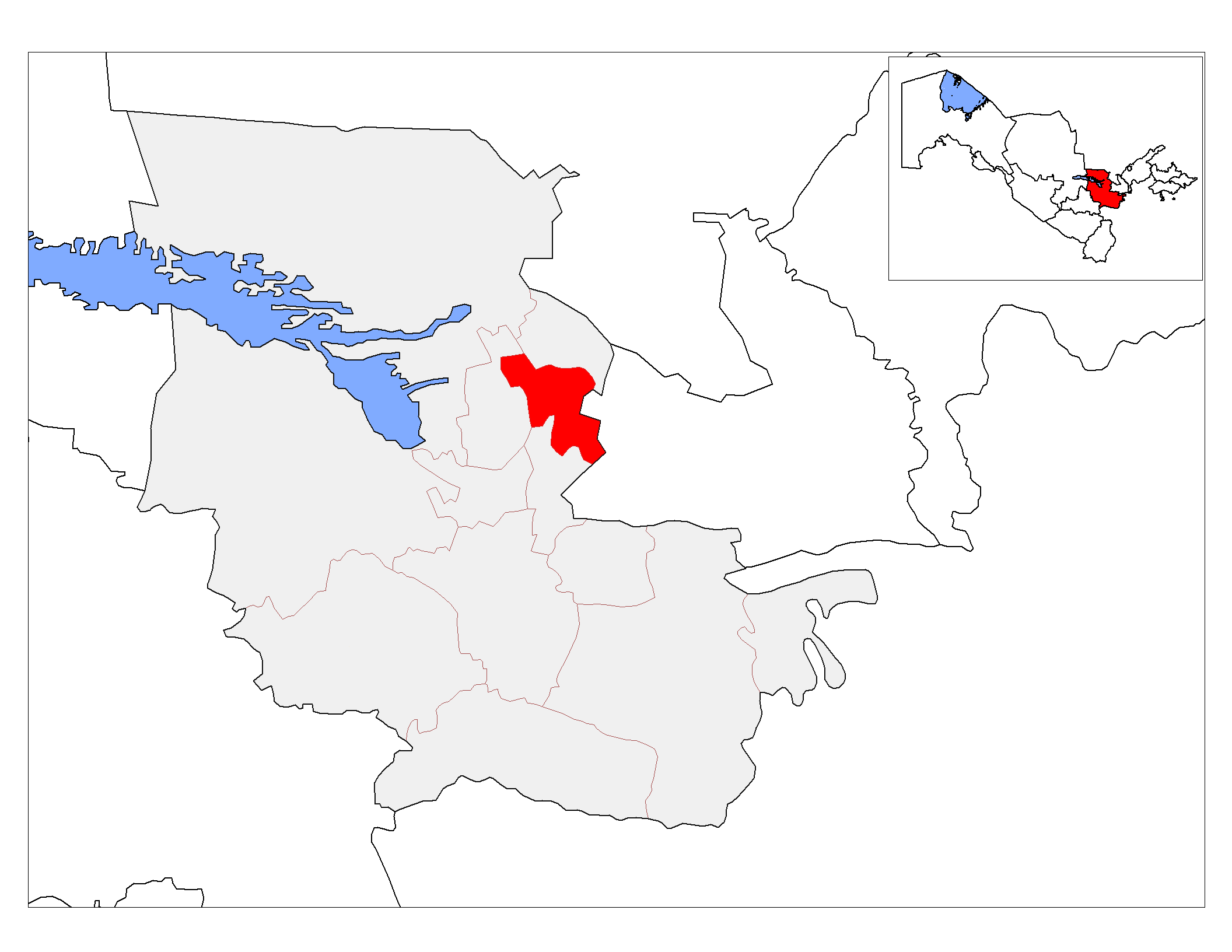
- Seal
- Interactive map of Doʻstlik
- Country: Uzbekistan
- Region: Jizzakh Region
- Capital: Doʻstlik
- Established: 1975

Area
  - Total: 450 km^{2} (170 sq mi)

Population
  - Total: 65,900
  - Density: 150/km^{2} (380/sq mi)
- Time zone: UTC+5 (UZT)

Doʻstlik is a district of Jizzakh Region in Uzbekistan. The capital lies at the city Doʻstlik. It has an area of 450 km^{2} (170 sq mi) and its population is 65,900 (2020 est.).

The district consists of one city (Doʻstlik), one urban-type settlements (Navroʻz) and 7 rural communities.
