= Arnasoy District =

Coordinates: 40.5600°N 67.8020°E

Arnasoy
- District
- Arnasoy tumani
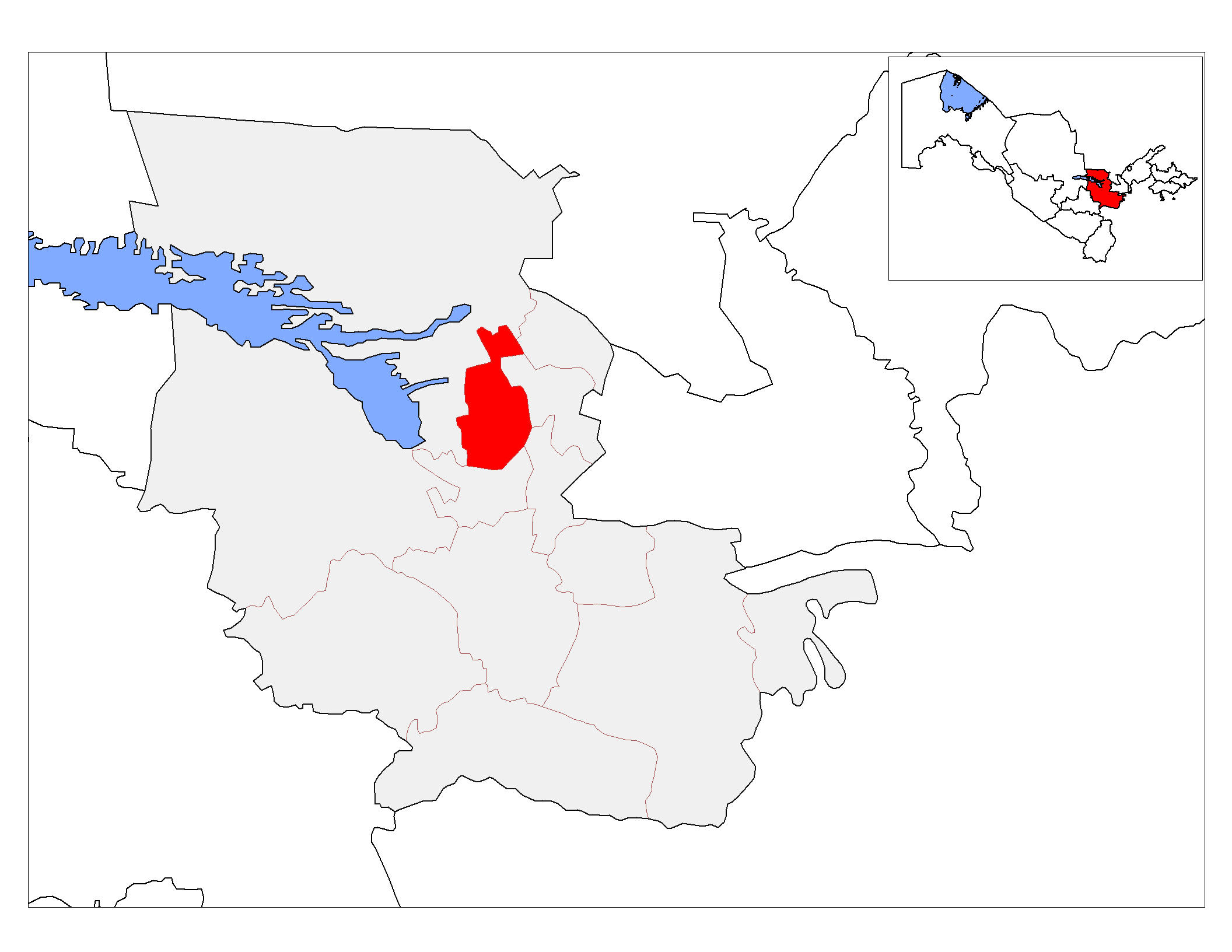
- Country: Uzbekistan
- Region: Jizzakh Region
- Capital: Gʻoliblar
- Established: 1975

Area
  - Total: 490 km^{2} (190 sq mi)

Population (2020)
  - Total: 46,200
  - Density: 94/km^{2} (240/sq mi)
- Time zone: UTC+5 (UZT)

Arnasoy (Uzbek: Arnasoy tumani) is a district of Jizzakh Region in Uzbekistan. The capital lies at the town Gʻoliblar. It has an area of 490 km^{2} (190 sq mi) and its population is 46,200 (2020 est.).

The district consists of two urban-type settlements (Gʻoliblar, Gulbahor) and 6 rural communities.
