= Forish =

- Location within Uzbekistan
- Coordinates: 40°33′N 66°54′E
- Country: Uzbekistan
- Region: Jizzakh Region
- District: Forish District

Population
  - Total: 971

Forish (Uzbek: Forish / Фориш, Russian: Фариш, romanized: Farish) is a mountain village in Forish District, Jizzakh Region, Uzbekistan. It has approximately 971 inhabitants.
