= Dashtobod =

- City
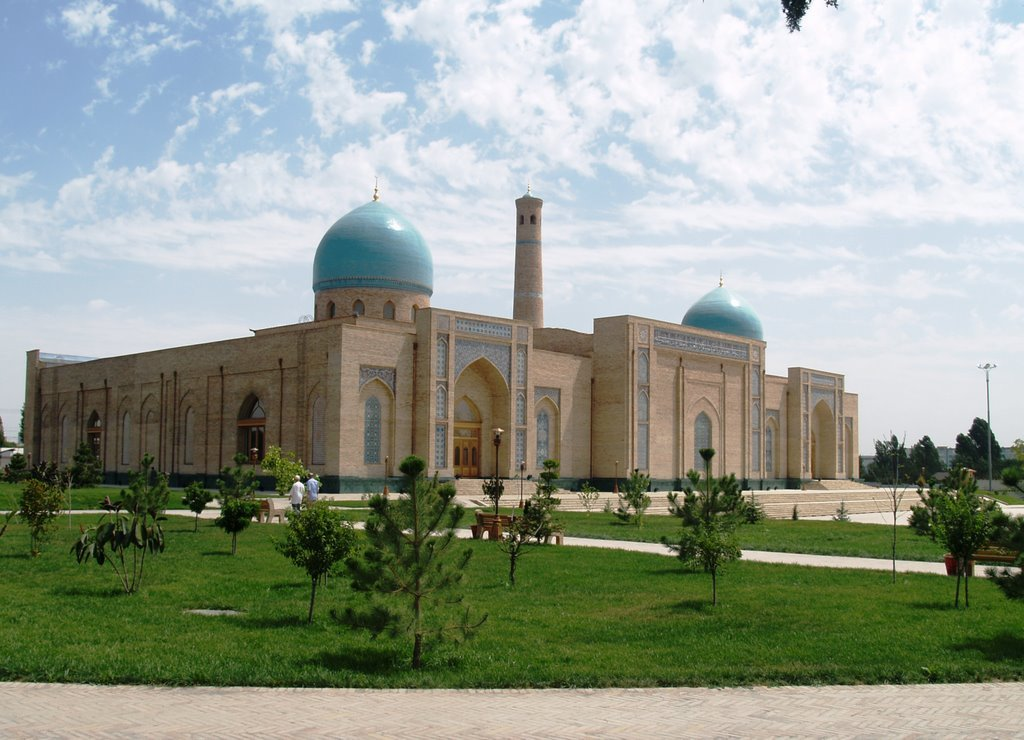
- Dashtobod Mosque

- Location in Uzbekistan
- Coordinates: 40°07′37″N 68°29′40″E
- Country: Uzbekistan
- Region: Jizzakh Region
- District: Zomin District

Population (2016)
  - Total: 36,500
- Time zone: UTC+5 (UZT)

Dashtobod (Uzbek: Dashtobod/Даштобод; Russian: Даштабад) is a city in Jizzakh Region, Uzbekistan. It is part of Zomin District. Its population is 36,500 (2016). From 1974 to the early 1990s the city was known as Ulyanovo.
