= Gagarin, Uzbekistan =

Gagarin
- City
- Location in Uzbekistan
- Coordinates: 40°39′43″N 68°10′20″E
- Country: Uzbekistan
- Region: Jizzakh Region
- District: Mirzachoʻl District
- Town status: 1974

Population (2016)
  - Total: 15,200
- Time zone: UTC+5 (UZT)

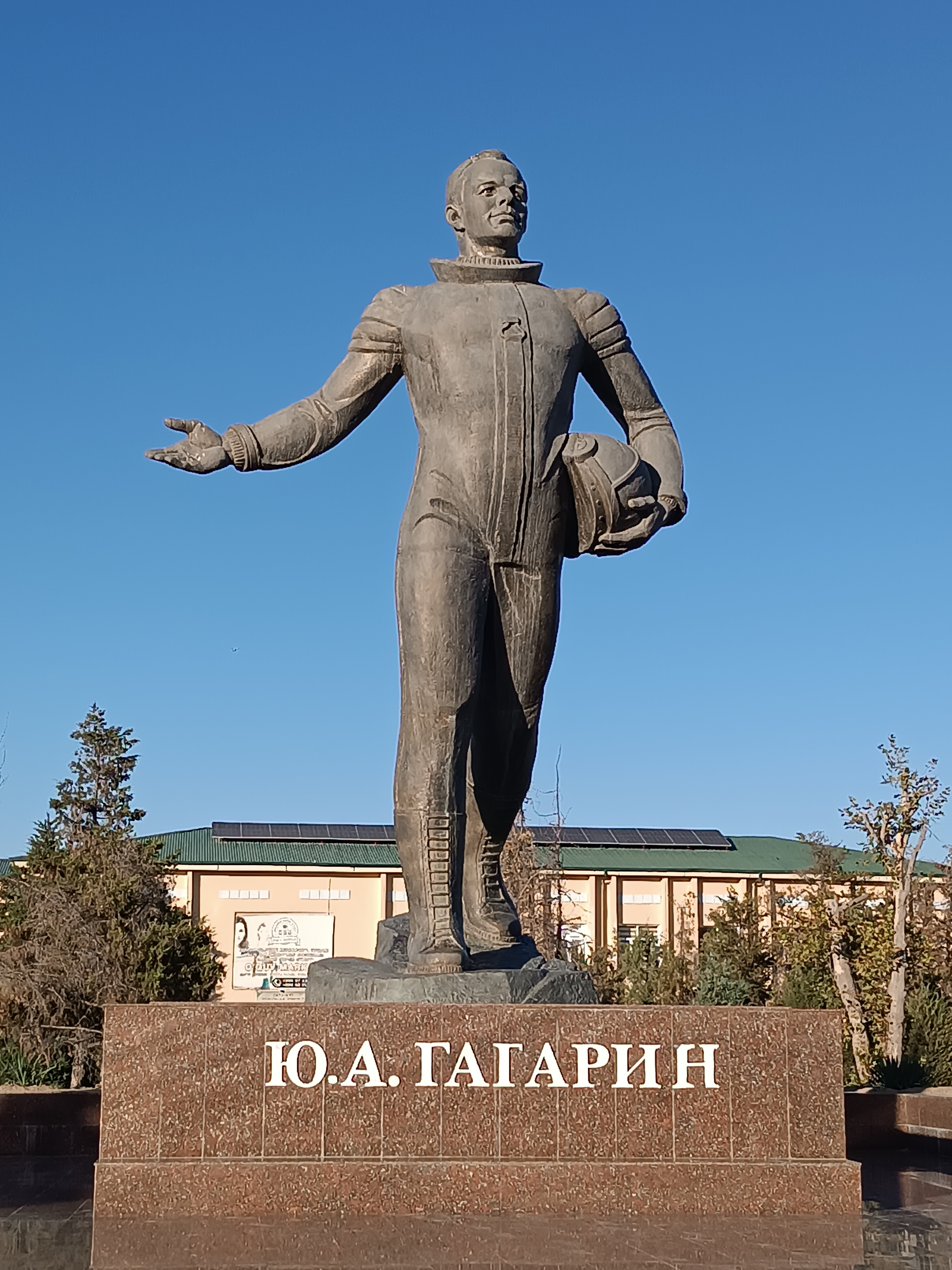
Gagarin monument

Gagarin (Uzbek: Gagarin/Гагарин, Russian: Гагарин) is a city in Jizzakh Region, Uzbekistan. It is the administrative center of Mirzachoʻl District. The town population was 17,907 people in 1989, and 15,200 in 2016.
