= Yangiobod District =

Yangiobod
- District
- Yangiobod tumani
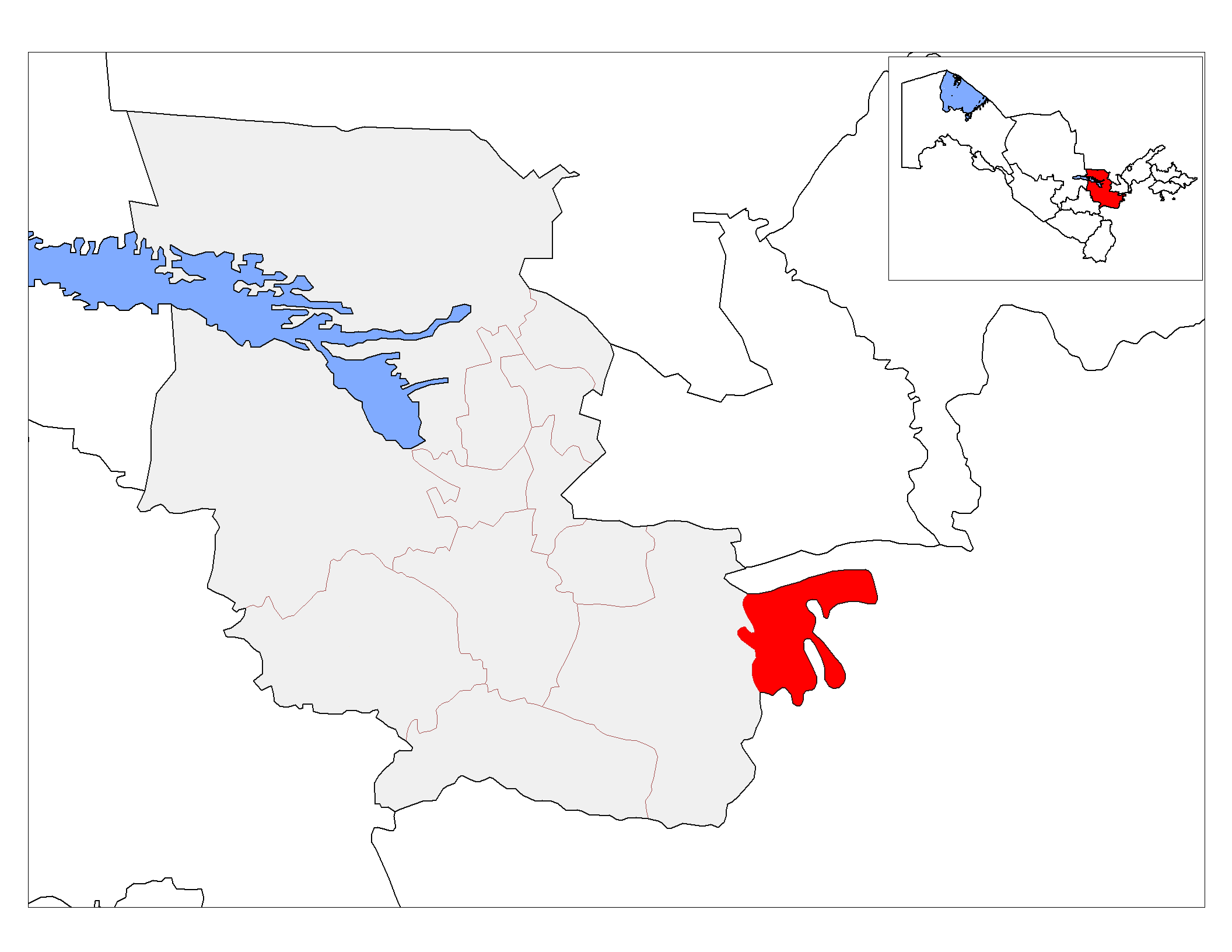
- Location within Jizzakh Region
- Coordinates: 39.9660°N 68.7590°E
- Country: Uzbekistan
- Region: Jizzakh Region
- Capital: Balandchaqir

Area
  - Total: 720 km^{2} (280 sq mi)

Population (2020)
  - Total: 28,300
  - Density: 39/km^{2} (100/sq mi)
- Time zone: UTC+5 (UZT)

Yangiobod (Uzbek: Yangiobod tumani) is a district of Jizzakh Region in Uzbekistan. The capital lies at the village Balandchaqir. Its area is 720 km^{2} (280 sq mi), and its population is 28,300 (2020 est.).

The district consists of two urban-type settlements (Yangiobod and Savot) and 5 rural communities (Xovos, Sarmich, Xoʻjamushkent, Savat and Havotogʻ).
