= Gʻallaorol District =

Coordinates: 39.9882°N 67.5840°E

Gʻallaorol
- District
- Gʻallaorol tumani
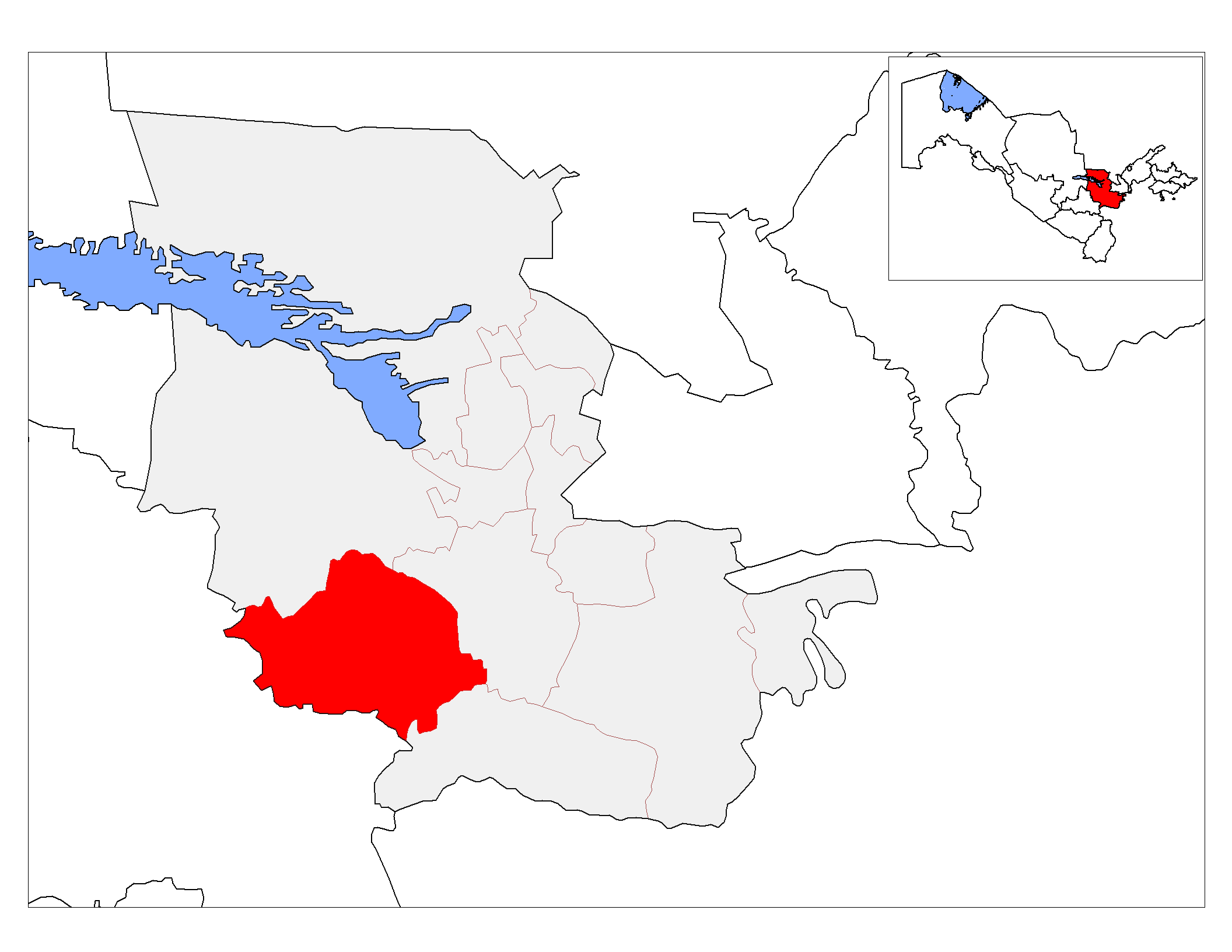
- Country: Uzbekistan
- Region: Jizzakh Region
- Capital: Gʻallaorol
- Established: 1926

Area
  - Total: 1,950 km^{2} (750 sq mi)

Population (2020)
  - Total: 173,000
  - Density: 88.7/km^{2} (230/sq mi)
- Time zone: UTC+5 (UZT)

Gʻallaorol (Uzbek: Gʻallaorol tumani, Russian: Галляаральский район) is a district of Jizzakh Region, Uzbekistan. The capital lies at the city Gʻallaorol. It has an area of 1,950 km^{2} (750 sq mi) and its population is 173,000 (2020 est.).

== Settlements ==
The district consists of one city (Gʻallaorol), 6 urban-type settlements (Marjonbuloq, Qoʻytosh, Lalmikor, Qangliobod, Abdukarim, Chuvilloq) and 14 rural communities (Gʻoʻbdin, Xonimqo'rg'on, Ittifoq, Gulchambar, Qipchoqsuv, Koʻkbuloq, Korizquduq, Guliston, Buloqboshi, Madaniyat, Mirzabuloq, Moltob, Tozaurugʻ, Mulkush).

== Population ==
It has a population of 173,000 people. The average population density is 89 people per km^{2}. The urban population is 60.9 thousand, the rural population is 112.1 thousand people.

== Geography ==
=== Topography ===
The central and western part of the Gʻallaorol district is composed of plains, with high mountain ranges and mountains. The district is surrounded by Nurata Range from the north and the Molguzar Mountain in the east. It borders with Jizzakh, Bakhmal, and Forish districts of Jizzakh Region and with Buklungur, Jomboy, and Kushrabot districts of Samarqand Region to the west.

=== Geology ===
The most parts of the Gʻallaorol district is formed by plains consisting of loess and yellow soil layer, moving from 380 to 400 meters to the north of 1600–1900 meters to the north. This plain, formed by the Sangzor River, dates back to the Nurata mountain range. The soil in the central and northern part of the hillsides is a greasy, opaque, typical gray soils formed on the soil. The territory of the district is rich in mineral resources such as lead minerals, zircon, zinc and gold. There are sand, gravel, gypsum, granite, limestone and other homogeneous construction materials of local significance. The district also profits from mineral water supply.

=== Climate ===
Climate is sharp continental, dry summer, cold winter. The average January temperature is -2 °C and 32 °C in July. Yearly rainfall is 326 mm. Vegetation period is 240 days.

== Economy ==
In the community and private farms of the district have cattle, sheep and goats, poultry and parrots. There is also a production of cereals, vegetables, potatoes, melons and vine.

== Wildlife ==
The wild-growing plants are tulips, lilac, mulberry, sesame, shoreta, wormwood, spruce, bergamot, among others. The fauna consists of wolves, foxes, hogs, alleys, arches, rabbits; rodents, frogs, poisonous snakes, echinaceae, hawthorn, the moth, the mushroom, the field mouse; eagles, birds, quails, shrubs, doves, pigeons, there are various fishes in the water basins. Some kinds of mushroom also exist.

== History ==
There are several archeological sites dating back until the first century (BC), called Qoʻngʻirtepa, Shaxidtepa, Almantepa, Jalmantepa, Lapaktepa, Pardakultepa, Nushkent.

Established on September 29, 1926, it was called Yangiqoʻrgʻon district until 1931.
