= Mirzachoʻl District =

Coordinates: 40.6600°N 68.1630°E

Mirzachoʻl
- District
- Mirzachoʻl tumani
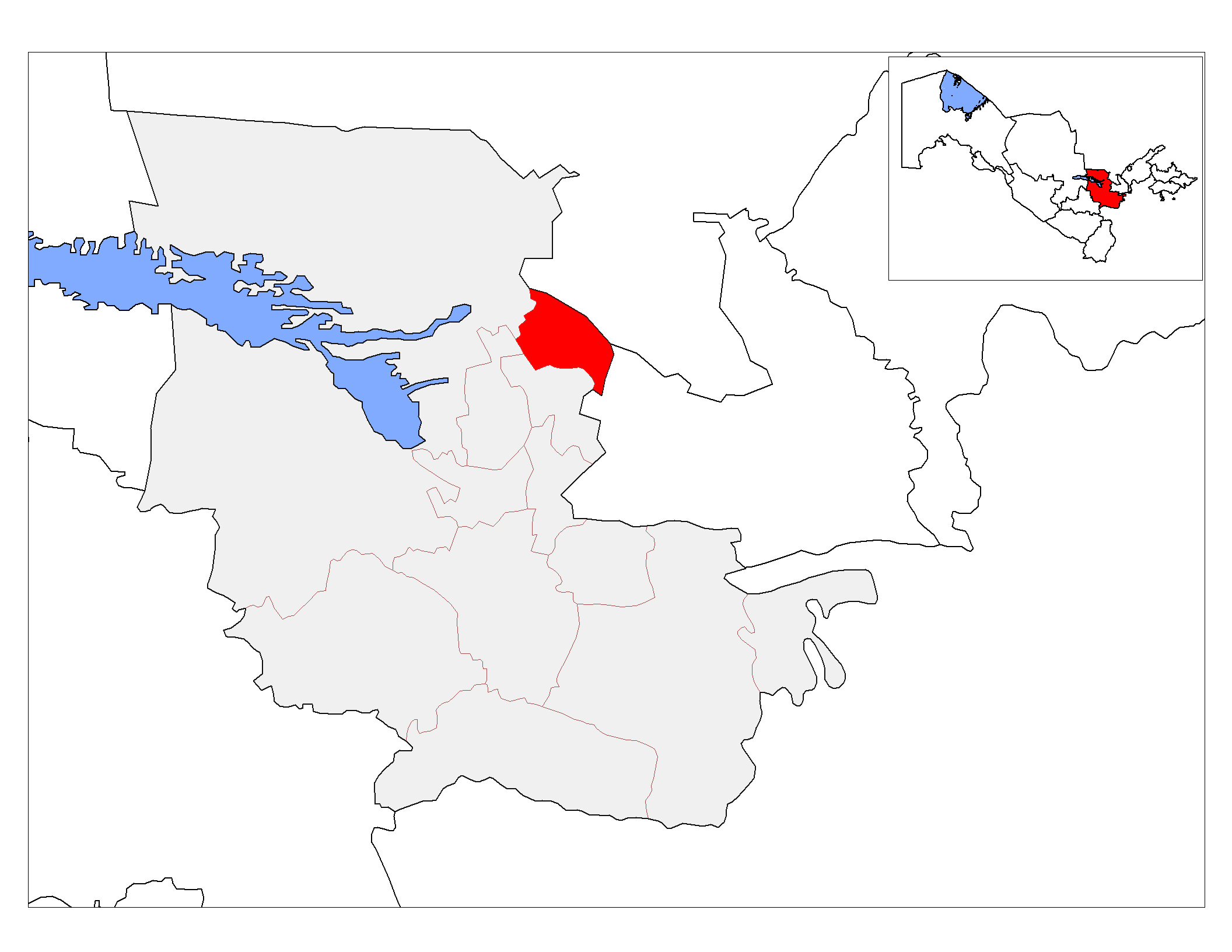
- Country: Uzbekistan
- Region: Jizzakh Region
- Capital: Gagarin
- Established: 09.01.1967

Government
  - Hokim: Mirzakulov Batirjan Kazakbaevich

Area
  - Total: 480 km^{2} (190 sq mi)

Population (2025)
  - Total: 57,100
  - Density: 120/km^{2} (310/sq mi)
- Time zone: UTC+5 (UZT)
- Postal code: 130300
- Area code: 72312
- Website: https://gov.uz/oz/mirzachul

Mirzachoʻl (Mirzachul, Mirzachol) is a district of Jizzakh Region in Uzbekistan. The capital lies at the city Gagarin. It has an area of 480 km^{2} (190 sq mi) and its population is 57,100 (2025 est.). Mirzachul District is a district located in the Jizzakh region. It was established on January 9, 1967. The district borders Kazakhstan to the north, Syrdarya region to the northeast, Dostlik district of Jizzakh region to the south, and Forish and Arnasay districts to the west. There is 1 city (Gagarin) and 12 mahalla citizens’ assemblies in Mirzachol district (Bogbon, Ipak Yoli, Paxtazor, Tashkent, Yangidala, Uzbekistan, Gulzor, Dostlik, Yerjar, Mustaqillik, Galaba, Mirzadala). The administrative center is the city of Gagarin. The city of Gagarin consists of 4 mahallas (Dostlik, Yerjar, Mustaqillik, Galaba).

== Population of Mirzachol District ==
The relief of Mirzachol district consists of low plains. The climate is sharply continental and dry, cold in winter and hot in summer. The average temperature is –1.5 °C in January and 30 °C in July; the minimum temperature is –30 °C (in January), and the maximum temperature is 42 °C (in July). The vegetation period lasts 224 days. The average annual precipitation is 240 mm. The soil is light gray and saline. Among wild plants, there are species such as feather grass, wormwood, camelthorn, saltwort, rang, iloq, sedge, reed, black nightshade, asparagus, shamak, tamarisk, wild jujube, poplar, willow and others. Wild animals include hare, bustard, fox, jackal; rodents such as rats, mole rats, and field mice; reptiles such as tortoises, snakes, and lizards; birds such as steppe eagles and wild ducks.

== Economy ==
The district economy is mainly specialized in agriculture. Industrial enterprises, transport, communication, and construction sectors are also active. Cotton growing, grain farming, horticulture, and livestock breeding are developed. There are small and private enterprises in the district. The total cultivated area of Mirzachol district is 28.2 thousand hectares, including 13.8 thousand hectares of cotton, 11 thousand hectares of grain crops, 1.2 thousand hectares of legumes, and 321 hectares of melons and vegetables. There are dehkan farms, collective farms, fattening farms, and 9 cooperative farms.

A main railway passes through the district. Highways such as Syrdarya–Jizzakh, Kazakhstan’s Yettisoy district–Pakhtakor, and Gulistan–Gagarin are available. Cattle, sheep, goats, and poultry are raised in farms. In Mirzachol district, there are a motor transport enterprise, a cotton processing plant, a textile production cooperative, a technical alcohol production plant, rental enterprises, joint-stock companies, as well as trade, cultural, and бытовые (household service) facilities. There are 17 state and 26 non-state preschool institutions (more than 3,300 children), 20 general secondary schools (more than 9,000 students), 2 vocational schools, 1 library, 4 cultural and recreation parks, 7 stadiums, and monuments. There is 1 central hospital, 3 private medical institutions, 5 rural medical outpatient clinics, 2 feldsher-midwife points, and 10 pharmacies. The Gagarin sanatorium operates in the district. Since 1968, the newspaper “Mirzachol Ovozi” (formerly “Dostlik”) has been published.

== Mahallas (Neighborhoods) of Mirzachol District ==
=== Mustaqillik Mahalla ===
The Mustaqillik mahalla citizens’ assembly is one of the neighborhoods of Mirzachol district. Its total area is 106 hectares, all of which is residential. The main specialization of the mahalla is in the service sector. There are 1,289 households with 1,372 families. Mostly individual houses are located here, and infrastructure and services are well developed.

=== Ipak Yoli Mahalla ===
One of the largest mahallas in the district. The total area is 4,803.5 hectares, of which 157 hectares are residential. The main specialization is agriculture and livestock. There are 723 households with 871 families.

=== Yangidala Mahalla ===
A mahalla specialized in agriculture. The total area is 8,880.2 hectares, with 180 hectares residential. There are 728 households with 817 families.

=== Mirzadala Mahalla ===
A densely populated mahalla. The total area is 4,386.5 hectares, with 200 hectares residential. There are 1,123 households with 1,229 families.

=== Bogbon Mahalla ===
An agriculture-oriented mahalla with a total area of 2,033.3 hectares, of which 158 hectares are residential. There are 534 households with 745 families.

=== Yerjar Mahalla ===
A service-oriented mahalla. The total area is 446.6 hectares, with 210 hectares residential. There are 1,002 households with 1,011 families.

=== Galaba Mahalla ===
A large residential mahalla with a total area of 278 hectares (280 hectares residential). There are 1,640 households with 2,118 families.

=== Paxtazor Mahalla ===
An agriculture-based mahalla with a total area of 5,314.6 hectares, of which 133.2 hectares are residential. There are 600 households with 787 families.

=== Uzbekistan Mahalla ===
One of the major mahallas. The total area is 4,845.9 hectares, with 178.9 hectares residential. There are 836 households with 854 families.

=== Dostlik Mahalla ===
A service-oriented mahalla with a total area of 148 hectares (152 hectares residential). There are 1,034 households with 1,170 families.

=== Tashkent Mahalla ===
An agriculture-specialized mahalla. The total area is 5,547.3 hectares, with 268.4 hectares residential. There are 734 households with 892 families.

=== Gulzor Mahalla ===
A livestock-specialized mahalla. The total area is 5,210.1 hectares, with 67.7 hectares residential. There are 250 households with 326 families.
