= Paxtakor =

- Location in Uzbekistan
- Coordinates: 40°18′55″N 67°57′16″E
- Country: Uzbekistan
- Region: Jizzakh Region
- District: Paxtakor District
- Elevation: 305 m (1,001 ft)

Population (2016)
  - Total: 23,900
- Time zone: UTC+5 (UZT)
- Postal code: 130900-130904

Paxtakor (Uzbek: Paxtakor/Пахтакор, Persian: پخته‌کار, Russian: Пахтакaр) is a city in Jizzakh Region, Uzbekistan. It is the capital of Paxtakor District. It had a population of 15,366 in 1989, and 23,900 in 2016. In 1974 Paxtakor was granted city status. The city has a cotton-cleaning factory.

== Meaning ==
The word Pakhta(پخته) in Persian means cotton and kor from kar-, kardan(کار، کردن) "to do, to make", produces a job name from a noun.
