= Balandchaqir =

- Village
- Location in Uzbekistan
- Coordinates: 39°52′49″N 68°47′46″E
- Country: Uzbekistan
- Region: Jizzakh Region
- District: Yangiobod District
- Village council (QFY): Xovos

Population
  - Total: 5 110
- Time zone: UTC+5 (UZT)

Balandchaqir (Uzbek: Balandchaqir, Russian: Баландчакир) is a village in Jizzakh Region, Uzbekistan. It is the administrative center of Yangiobod District.
