= Zafarobod District, Uzbekistan =

Coordinates: 40.4070°N 67.7390°E

Zafarobod
- District
- Zafarobod tumani
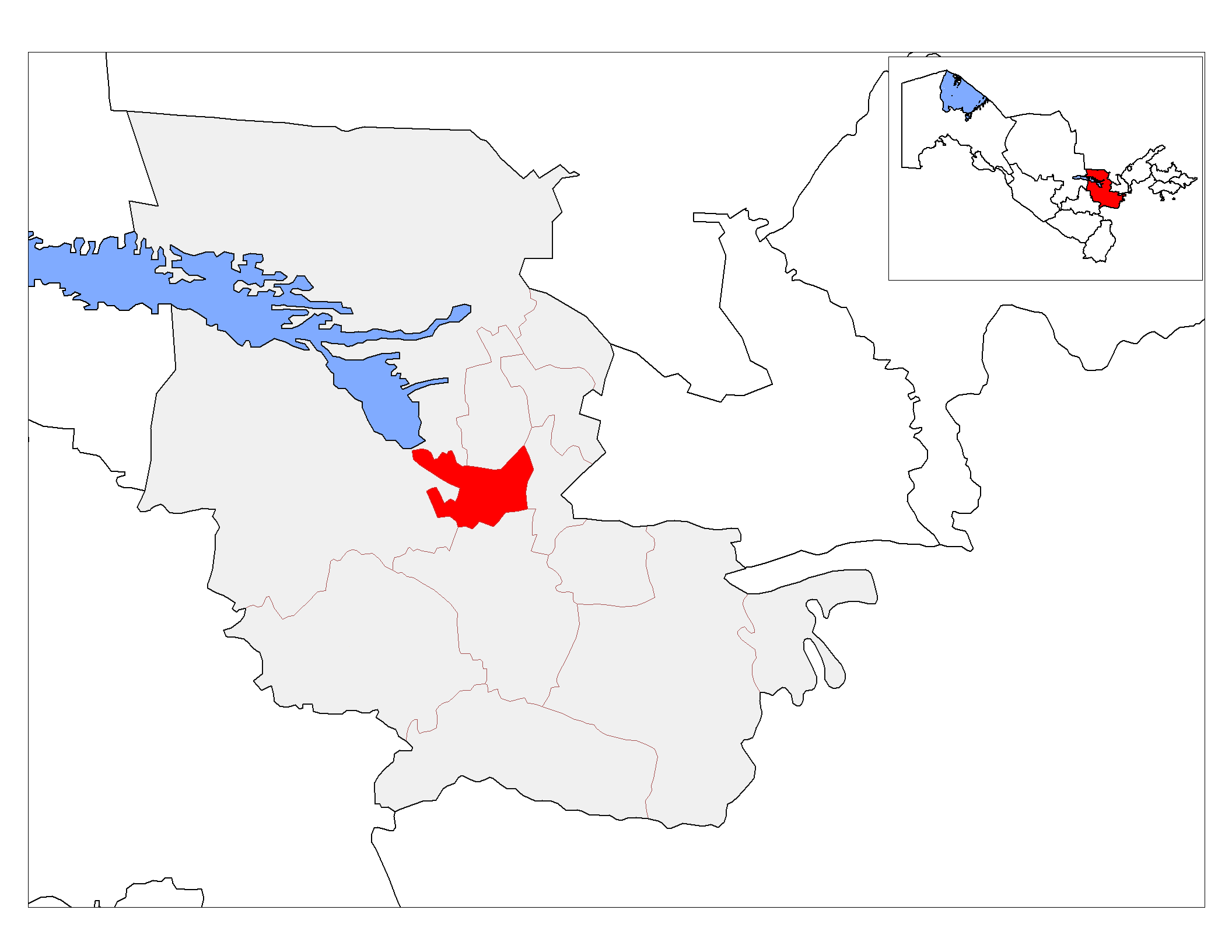
- Country: Uzbekistan
- Region: Jizzakh Region
- Capital: Zafarobod

Area
  - Total: 520 km^{2} (200 sq mi)

Population (2020)
  - Total: 50,100
  - Density: 96/km^{2} (250/sq mi)
- Time zone: UTC+5 (UZT)

Zafarobod is a district of Jizzakh Region in Uzbekistan. The capital lies at the town Zafarobod. It has an area of 520 km^{2} (200 sq mi) and its population is 50,100 (2020 est.).

The district consists of 4 urban-type settlements (Zafarobod, Yorqin, Pistalikent, Nurafshon) and 6 rural communities.
