= Gʻallaorol =

- City
- Location in Uzbekistan
- Coordinates: 40°01′17″N 67°35′51″E
- Country: Uzbekistan
- Region: Jizzakh Region
- District: Gʻallaorol District
- Town status: 1973

Population (2016)
  - Total: 24,700
- Time zone: UTC+5 (UZT)

Gʻallaorol (Uzbek: Gʻallaorol/Ғаллаорол, Russian: Галляарал) is a city in Jizzakh Region, Uzbekistan. It is the administrative center of Gʻallaorol District. The town population was 16,623 people in 1989, and 24,700 in 2016. Situated on the Tashkent–Samarkand railway, it became a city in 1973.
