= Zomin =

- urban-type settlement
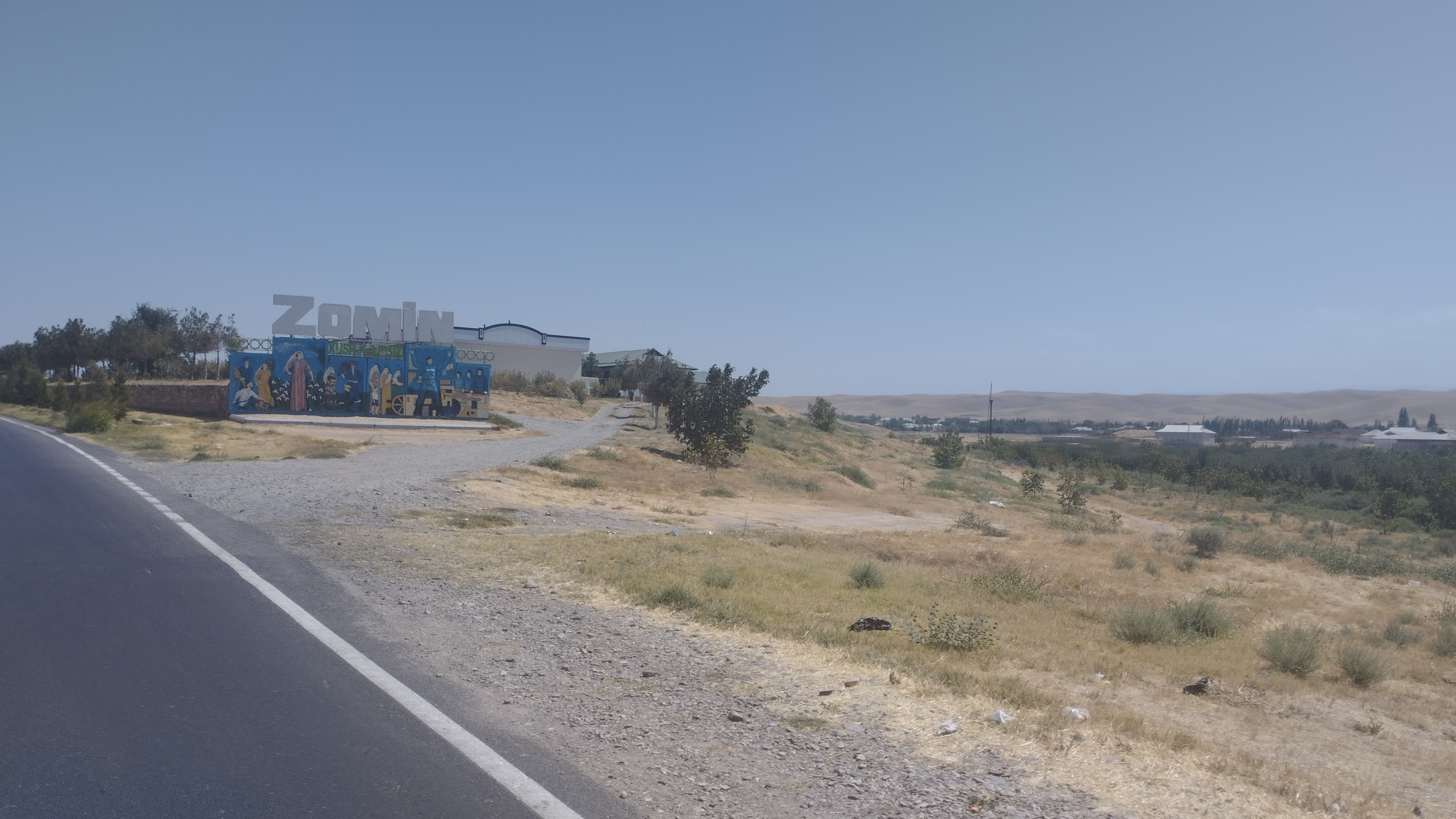

- Location in Uzbekistan
- Coordinates: 39°57′47″N 68°23′38″E
- Country: Uzbekistan
- Region: Jizzakh Region
- District: Zomin District
- Urban-type settlement status: 1986

Population (2011)
  - Total: 27,077
- Time zone: UTC+5 (UZT)

Zomin (Uzbek: Зомин, Zomin, Russian: Заамин, romanized: Zaamin) is an urban-type settlement in Jizzakh Region, Uzbekistan. It is the administrative centre of Zomin District. 14,215 people were residing in the town as of the 1989 census.

The association football club FK Zomin is based in the town.

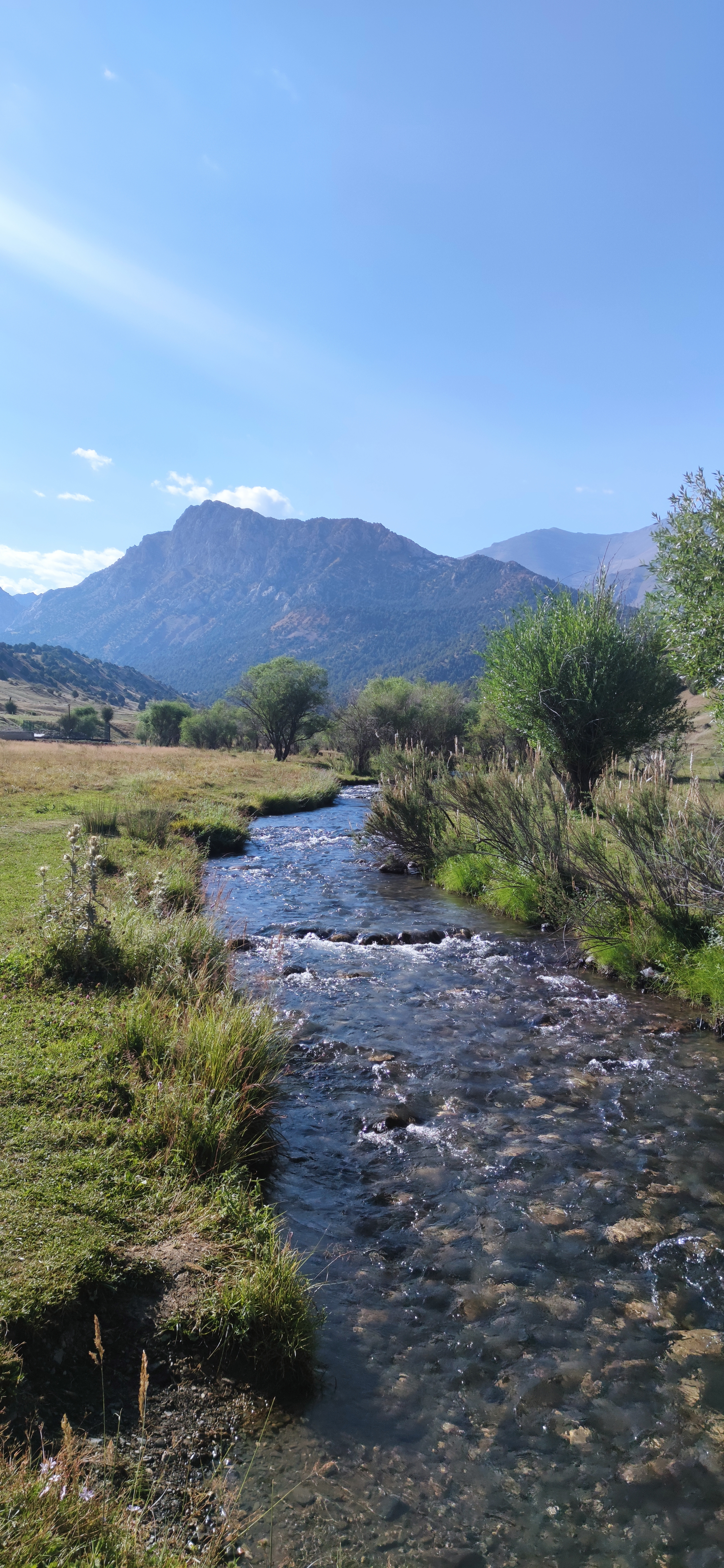
Landscape of Zomin district. Water resources of Zomin district

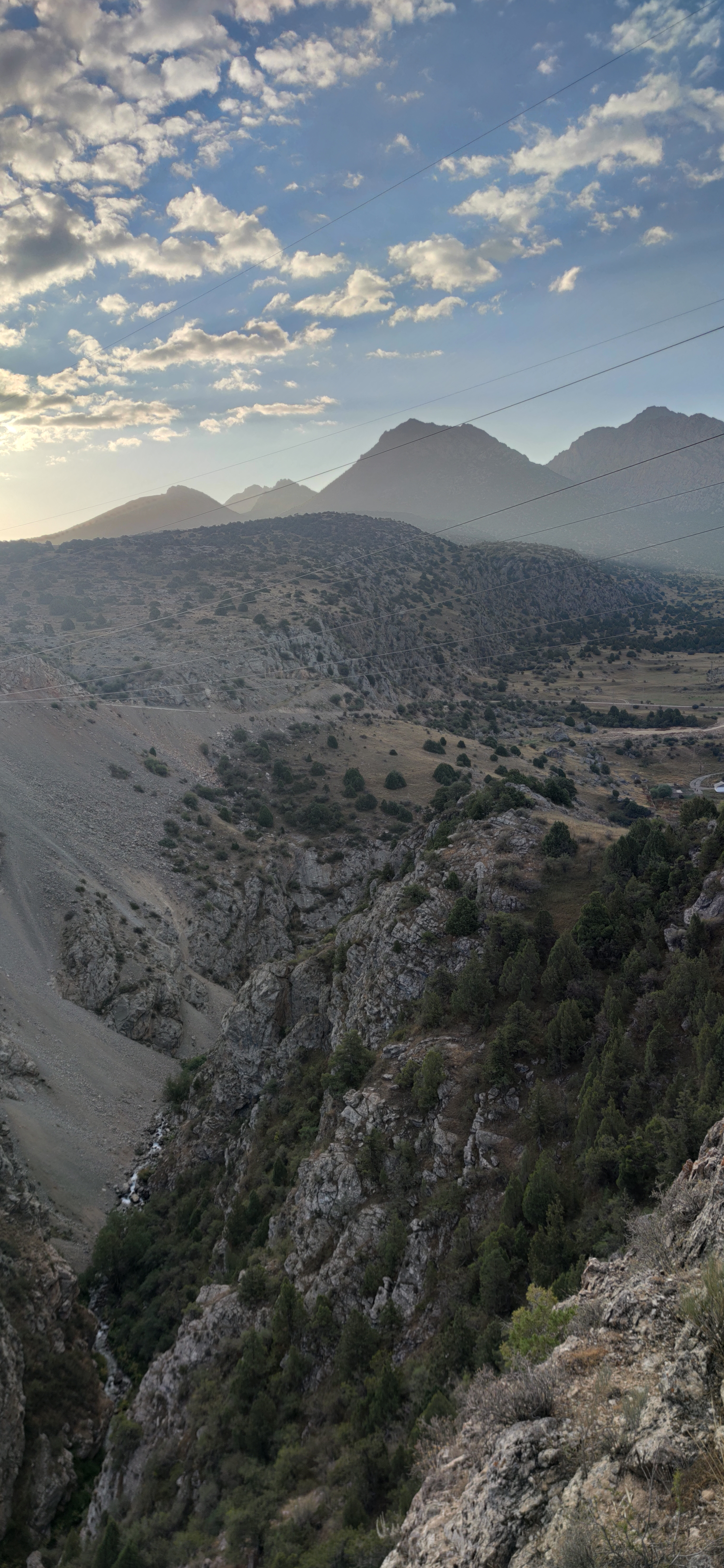
Zomin mountain forest reserve
