= Forish District =

Coordinates: 40.69°N 67.19°E

Forish
- District
- Forish tumani
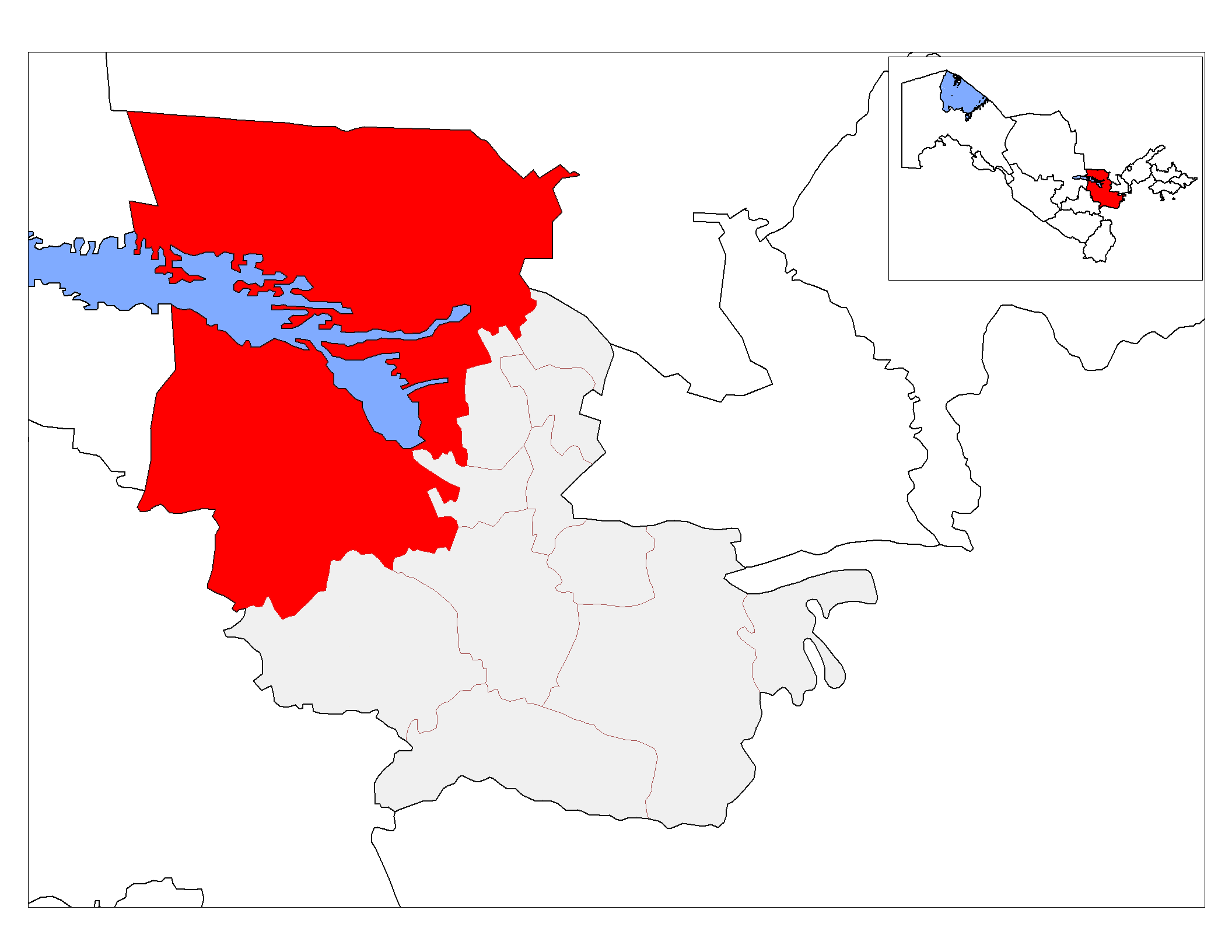
- Country: Uzbekistan
- Region: Jizzakh Region
- Capital: Bogʻdon
- Established: 1935

Area
  - Total: 9,560 km^{2} (3,690 sq mi)

Population (2020)
  - Total: 93,000
  - Density: 9.7/km^{2} (25/sq mi)
- Time zone: UTC+5 (UZT)
- Website: forishliklar.uz

Forish is a district of Jizzakh Region in Uzbekistan. The capital lies at the town Bogʻdon (Yangiqishloq). It has an area of 9,560 km^{2} (3,690 sq mi) and ts population is 93,000 (2020 est.).

The district consists of two urban-type settlements (Bogʻdon, Uchquloch) and 10 rural communities (Omonkeldi, Darvoza, Arnasoy, Qoraabdol, Egizbuloq, Qizilqum, Forish, Uxum, Garasha, Osmonsoy).

== Etymology ==
The National Encyclopedia of Uzbekistan explains the name of the district as follows: "According to local information, the name of the village of Forish, which was renamed the district, was taken from the name of the city of Parij, which Amir Temur wanted to build around Samarkand." There is an assumption that later in the local dialect this term changed to "Farij", "Forij", "Forish".

However, scientific analysis shows that the word Parij as a noun entered the Uzbek language through the Russian language. Therefore, the idea that the word Paris came to us through the Russian language during the time of Amir Temur cannot be accepted as close to reality. Also, so far, no sources has been found that Farish was named in reference to Paris in the historical sources of Timurids and later periods. From this it follows that the word Farish has no relation to the capital of France, Paris.

The name of the district was named after ancient village of Porasht, located 30 kilometers northwest of the current district center, northern side of Nurata Mountains.

The word "porasht" in the ancient Sogdian language means "the skirt of fortress" ("po" - skirt, edge, bottom; "rasht" - fortress).

== List of villages ==
Abdulkarim, Ana-Muna, Andagin, Archa, Balandosmon, Bayram, Beshbola, Birlashgan, Bog'oloni, Bolamon, Bolg'ali, Chaqar, Chaqir-Chuqur, Chimqo'rg'on, Chorbog', Churpak, Damariq, Darvoza, Deriston, Egizbuloq, Eshbo'ldi, Eskiqo'rg'on, G'o'rob, Garasha, Gulzor, Hasanota, Haydarota, Hoyat, Ilonchi, Ilonli, Ingichka, Ingichka, Isori, Jayraxona, Jonak, Kalsari, Katta Bog'don, Kattasoy, Ko'hnabozor, Ko'sa, Koriz, Lalik, Manishkar, Mexayan, Mirzayor, Mixin, Mo'lali, Mojarm, Mushkibiryon, Narvon, Nurak, O'rtabuloq, O'rtabuloq, O'rtaqishloq, O'xum, Olaqop, Omonbuloq, Omondara, Omonkeldi, Oqbuloq, Oqtepa, Oqtom, Oqtosh, Osmonsoy, Oytamg'ali, Pastki Hoyat, Pastki Uchquloch, Pastko'cha, Porasht, Qamish, Qashqar, Qiyaovul, Qiyqim, Qizilkum, Qizilqishloq, Qo'lba, Qo'rg'on, Qo'ybuloq, Qorabog'onali, Qoraobdol, Qoratosh, Qoraxon, Qurbonhoji, Quruqqo'l, Quyi Uchma, Safarota, Sartikon, Sayyod, Sog'ishmon, Tagqishloq, Temurxon, To'liboy, To'qay, Tutak, Uchquloch, Ustaqishloq, Ustaxon, Uzunbuloq, Xujur, Yarashlov, Yomchi, Yotoq, Yukari-Chorbog', Yuqori Uchma
