= Paxtakor District =

Coordinates: 40.3166°N 67.9665°E

Paxtakor
- District
- Paxtakor tumani
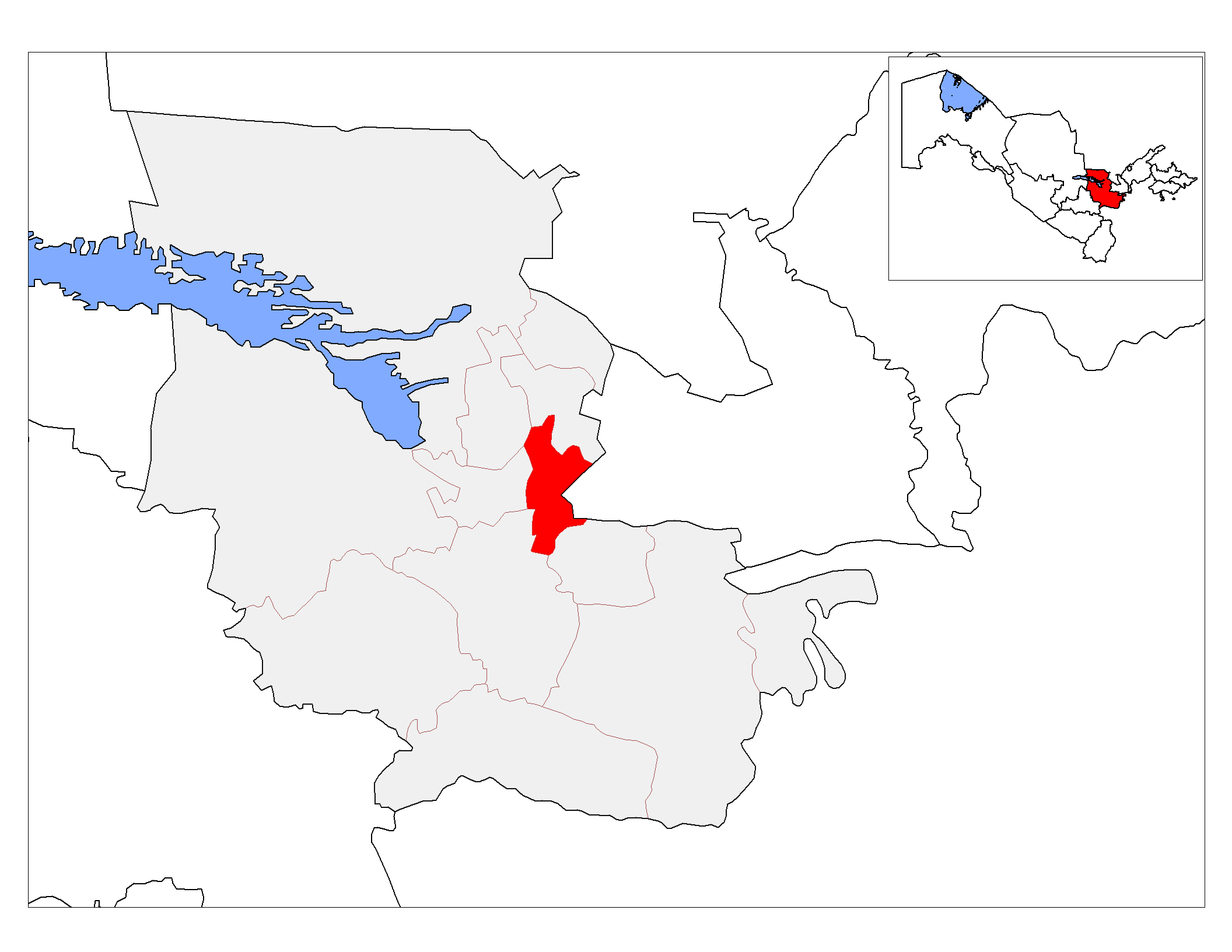
- Country: Uzbekistan
- Region: Jizzakh Region
- Capital: Paxtakor

Area
  - Total: 380 km^{2} (150 sq mi)

Population (2020)
  - Total: 74,900
  - Density: 200/km^{2} (510/sq mi)
- Time zone: UTC+5 (UZT)

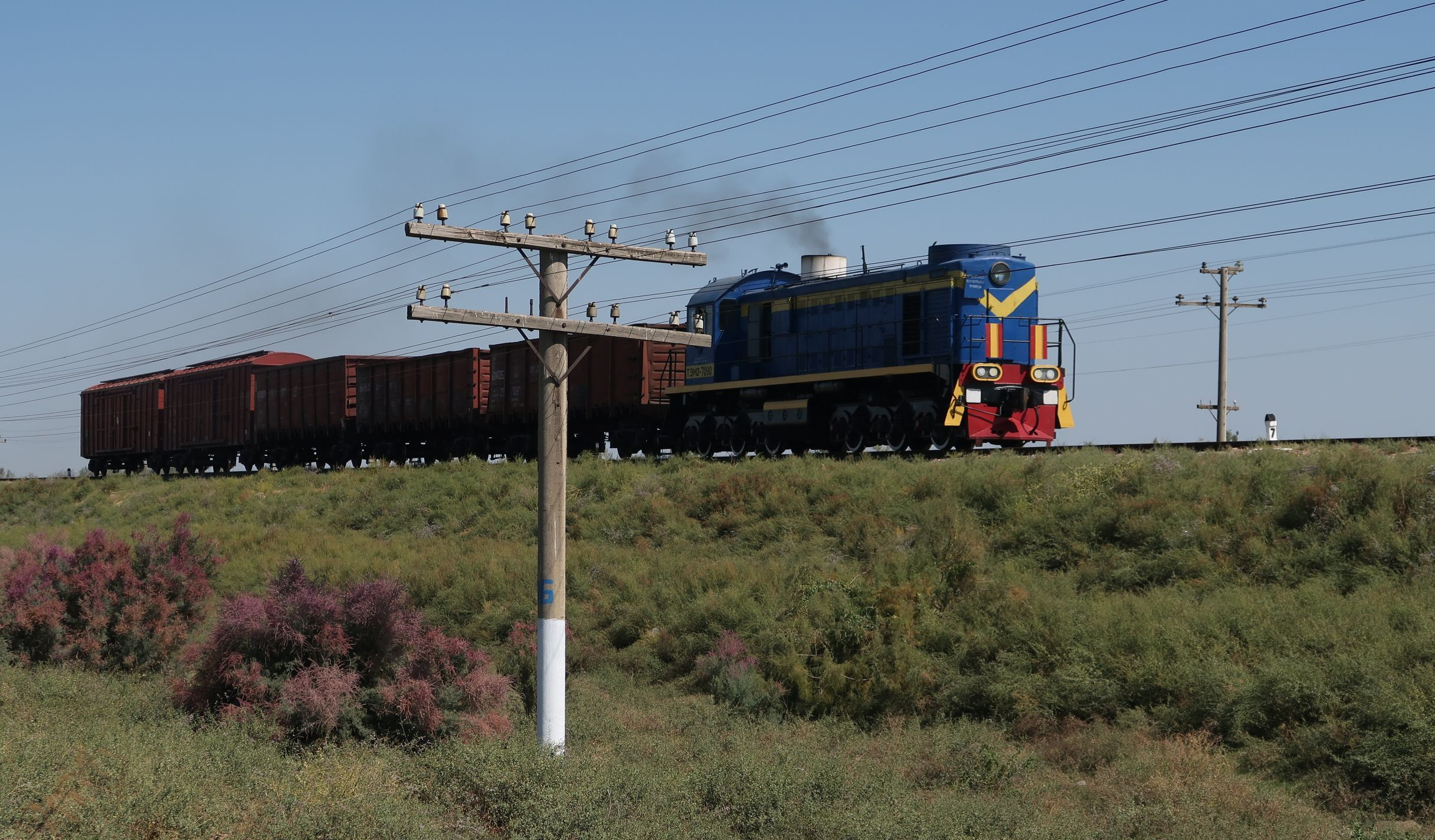
Train in Paxtakor District

Paxtakor is a district of Jizzakh Region in Uzbekistan. The capital lies at the city Paxtakor. It has an area of 380 km^{2} (150 sq mi) and its population is 74,900 (2020 est.). The district consists of one city (Paxtakor), one urban-type settlement (Gulzor) and 7 rural communities.
