= Ittifoq =

- urban-type settlement
- Location in Uzbekistan
- Coordinates: 41°8′53″N 72°8′52″E
- Country: Uzbekistan
- Region: Namangan Region
- Urban-type settlement status: 1989

Population (2004)
  - Total: 3,500
- Time zone: UTC+5 (UZT)

Ittifoq (/ˌɪtɪˈfɒk/; Uzbek: [it̚tʰɨ̥ˈɸɒq]) is an urban-type settlement in Namangan Region, Uzbekistan.
