= Zarbdor District =

Coordinates: 40.0930°N 68.1820°E

Zarbdor
- District
- Zarbdor tumani
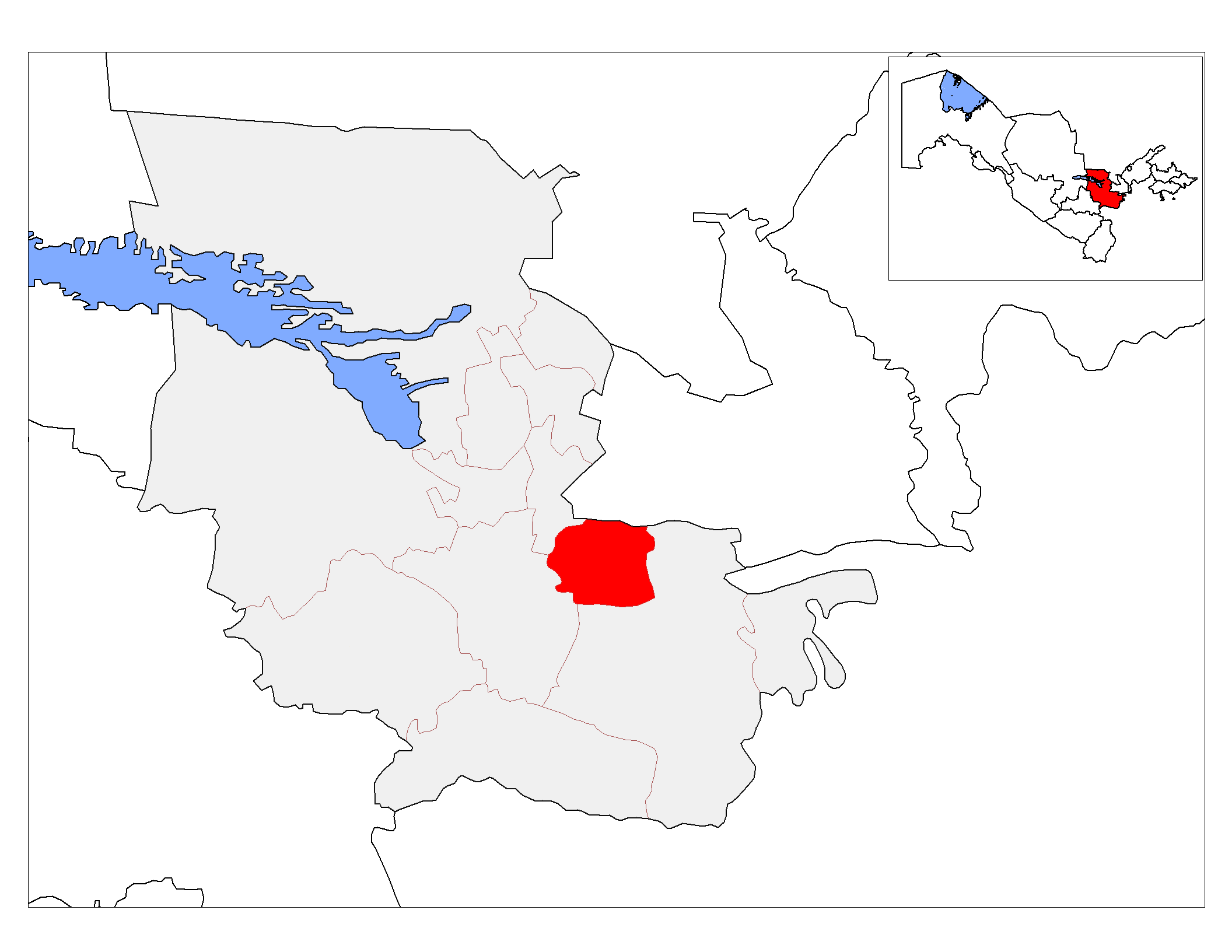
- Country: Uzbekistan
- Region: Jizzakh Region
- Capital: Zarbdor
- Established: 1979

Area
  - Total: 710 km^{2} (270 sq mi)

Population (2020)
  - Total: 86,900
  - Density: 120/km^{2} (320/sq mi)
- Time zone: UTC+5 (UZT)

Zarbdor is a district of Jizzakh Region in Uzbekistan. The capital lies at the town Zarbdor. It has an area of 710 km^{2} (270 sq mi) and its population is 86,900 (2020 est.).

The district consists of 4 urban-type settlements (Zarbdor, Boʻston, Fayzobod, Sharq yulduzi) and 8 rural communities.
