= Zomin District =

Coordinates: 39.9600°N 68.3790°E

Zomin
- District
- Zomin tumani
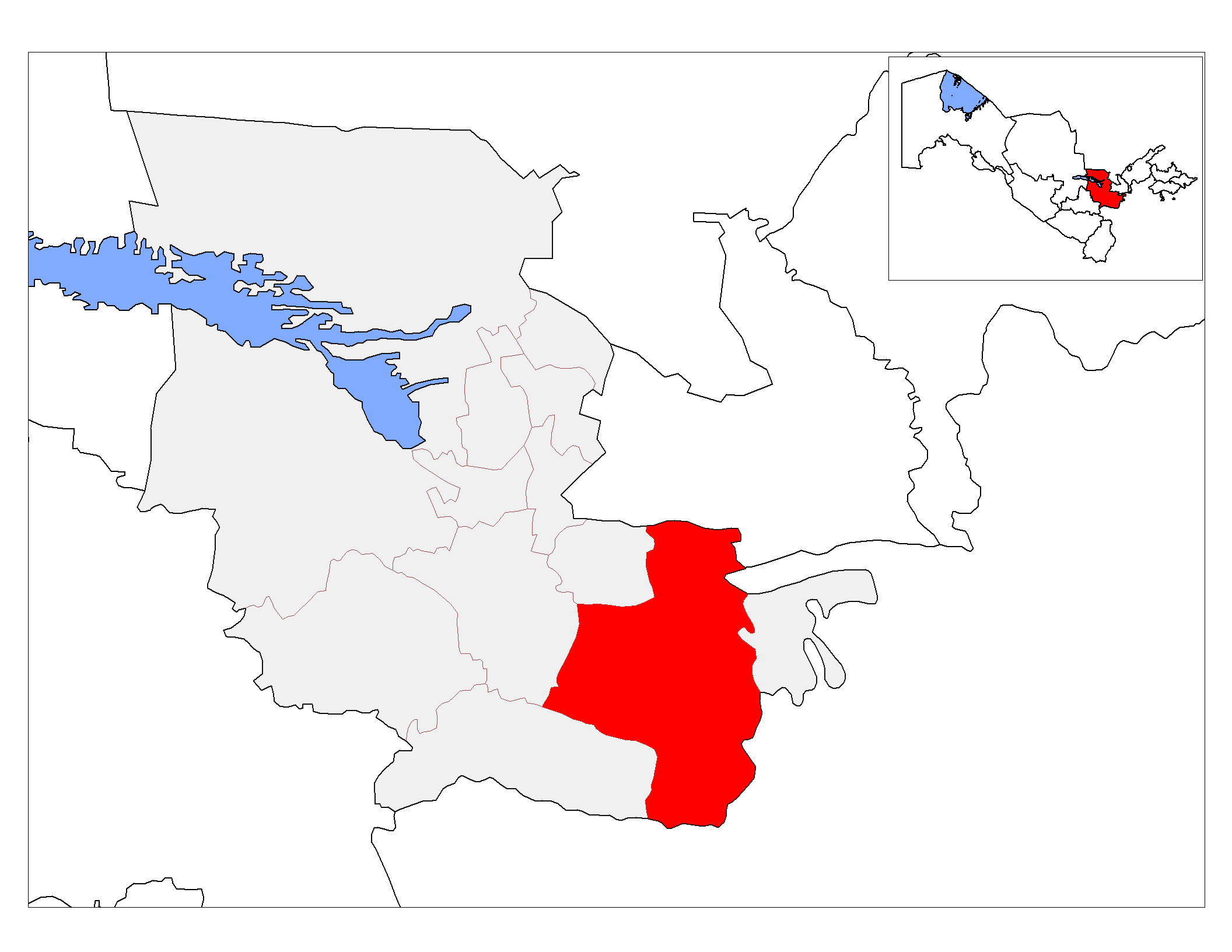
- Country: Uzbekistan
- Region: Jizzakh Region
- Capital: Zomin

Area
  - Total: 2,670 km^{2} (1,030 sq mi)

Population
  - Total: 165,100
  - Density: 61.8/km^{2} (160/sq mi)
- Time zone: UTC+5 (UZT)

Zomin is a district of Jizzakh Region in Uzbekistan. The capital lies at the town Zomin. Its area is 2,670 km2 (1,030 sq mi), and the estimated population for 2020 is 165,100.

The district consists of one city (Dashtobod), 6 urban-type settlements (Zomin, Yom, Sirgʻali, Pshagʻor) and 9 rural communities.
