= Baxmal District =

Bakhmal
- District
- Baxmal tumani
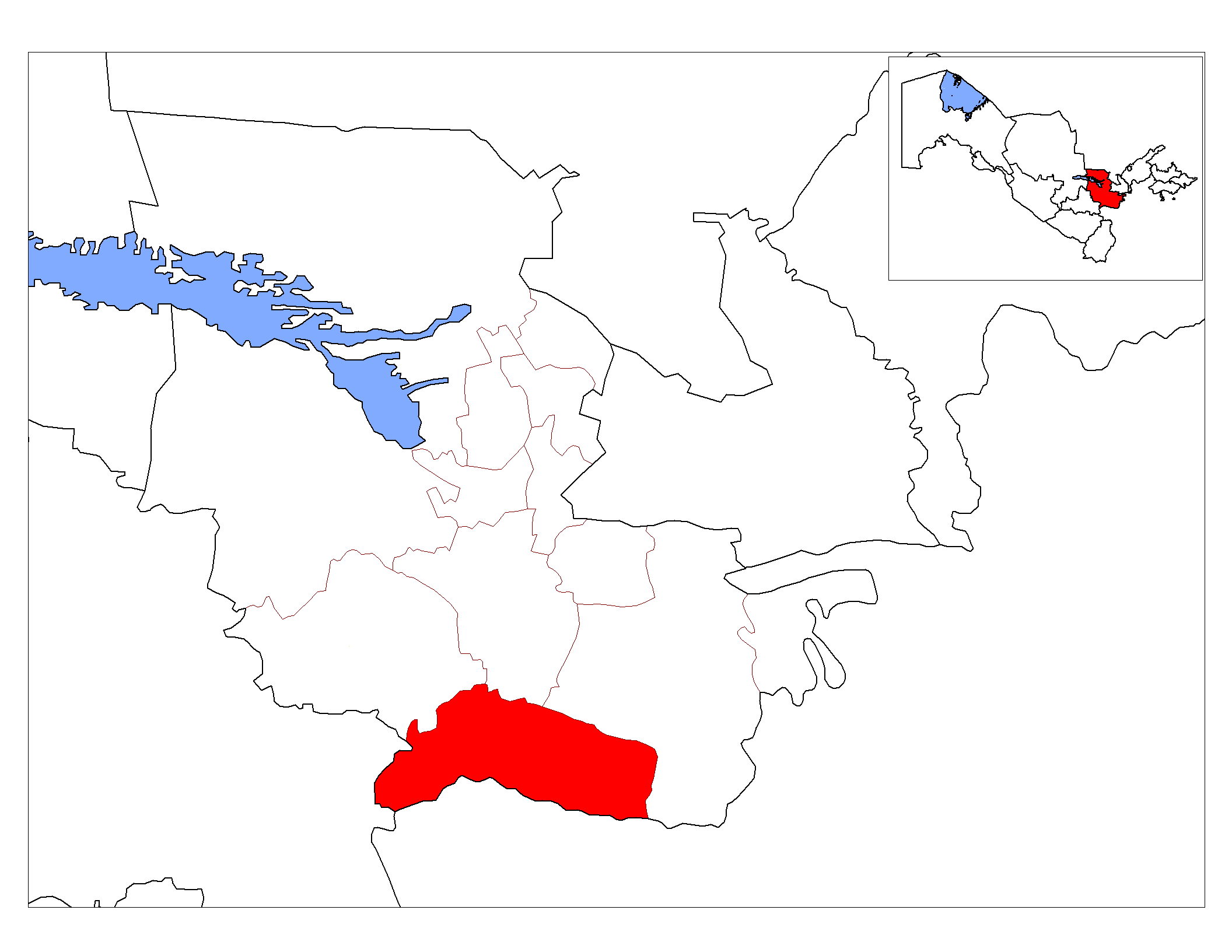
- Coordinates: 39.74°N 67.63°E
- Country: Uzbekistan
- Region: Jizzakh Region
- Capital: Oʻsmat
- Established: 1970

Area
  - Total: 1,860 km^{2} (720 sq mi)

Population (2020)
  - Total: 157,600
  - Density: 84.7/km^{2} (219/sq mi)
- Time zone: UTC+5 (UZT)

Bakhmal (Uzbek: Baxmal tumani) is a district of Jizzakh Region in Uzbekistan. The capital lies at the town Oʻsmat. It has an area of 1,860 km^{2} (720 sq mi) and its population is 157,600 (2020 est.).

The district consists of 7 urban-type settlements (Oʻsmat, Oqtosh, Moʻgʻol, Novqa, Alamli, Tongotar, Baxmal) and 10 rural communities.
