= Jizzakh Region =

Region of Uzbekistan

Jizzakh Region Жиззах вилояти / Jizzax viloyati
- Region
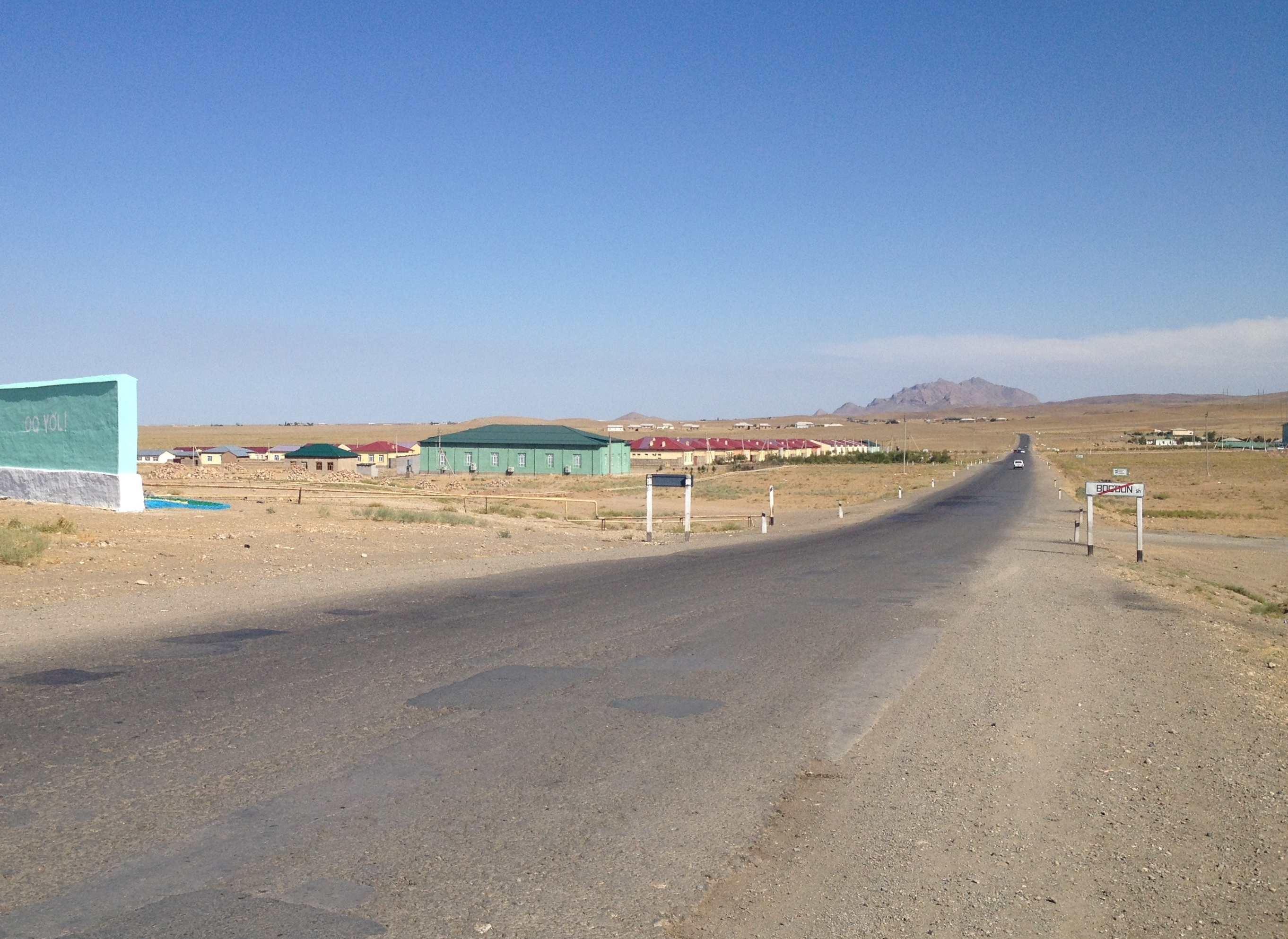
- Road near Yangikishlak

- Logo

- Jizzakh in Uzbekistan
- Coordinates: 40°25′N 67°40′E
- Country: Uzbekistan
- Capital: Jizzakh

Government
  - Hokim: Ergash Saliev

Area
  - Total: 21,210 km^{2} (8,190 sq mi)
- Elevation: 274 m (899 ft)

Population (2024)
  - Total: 1,635,608
  - Density: 77.11/km^{2} (199.7/sq mi)
- Time zone: UTC+5 (UZT)
- ISO 3166 code: UZ-JI
- Districts: 12
- Cities: 6
- Towns: 42
- Villages: 525
- Website: jizzax.uz

Jizzakh Region (Note: Uzbek: Жиззах вилояти, romanized: Jizzax viloyati, IPA: [dʒɨzˈzaχ ʋɪ̆lɔˌjæˈtɪ̆]; Tajik: Вилояти Ҷиззах, romanized: Viloyati Jizzax; Karakalpak: Жиззақ уәлаяты, romanized: Jizzaq wálayatı; Kazakh: Жызақ облысы, romanized: Jyzaq oblysy) (Note: Formerly known as Dzhizak Oblast (from Russian Джизакская область).) is one of the regions of Uzbekistan. It is located in the center/east of the country. It borders Tajikistan to the south and south-east, Samarqand Region to the west, Navoiy Region to the north-west, Kazakhstan to the north, and Sirdaryo Region to the east. It covers an area of 21,210 km^{2}. The population is 1,443,408 (2024 estimate) with 53% living in rural areas.

The regional capital is Jizzakh (pop. 212,689, 2024). Other major towns include Doʻstlik, Gagarin, Gʻallaorol, Paxtakor, and Dashtobod. Jizzakh Region was formerly a part of Sirdaryo Region but was given separate status in 1973.

== Economy ==
The economy of the Jizzakh Region is primarily based on agriculture. Cotton and wheat are the main crops, and extensive irrigation is used. Natural resources include lead, zinc, iron, and limestone. Uzbekistan and China are working together to jointly establish a Special Economic Zone in the region. This high-tech industrial park will be formally established by March 2013. The China Development Bank will provide a $50 million loan to finance several of the joint projects in the construction, agro-industrial and mechanical engineering sectors.

The region has a well-developed transportation infrastructure, with over 2500 km of surfaced roads.

== Geography ==
The climate is a typically continental climate, with mild winters and hot, dry summers.

The Zaamin National Park, formerly Guralash Reserve, on the western slopes of the Turkestan Range and known for its unique fauna and flora, is also within the region.

Wildlife is considered extremely rich here; in spring and in summer, alpine meadows are with a multitude of colors: bright-red tulips and snow-white acacias. In autumn, the hills are decorated with the gold-colored domes of the hazelnut trees, columns of birch-trees, towering plane trees, and green thickets. High in the mountains, in the upper part of the Guralashsoy gorge, is a nesting-place of black storks. These rare birds are considered as precious in Uzbekistan. They are written down in the "Redbooks" in many countries as an endangered species. Early in the spring, when the Arnasoy depression is flooded, flocks of ducks, wild geese, pelicans and grey herons are found here. This territory serves as a nesting place for rose-coloured starlings, shrikes, and sandpipers.

== Districts ==
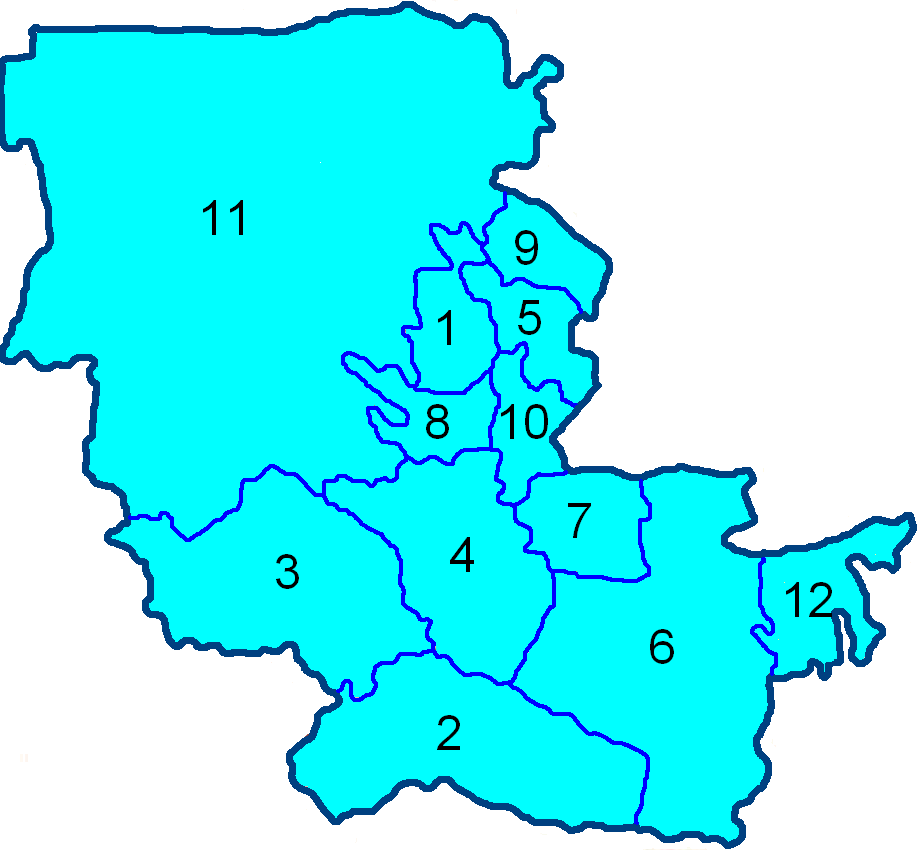
Division of Jizzakh Region into tumans (districts)

The Jizzakh Region consists of 12 districts (listed below) and one district-level city: Jizzakh.

Key	District name	District capital
1	Arnasoy District	Gʻoliblar
2	Baxmal District	Oʻsmat
3	Doʻstlik District	Doʻstlik
4	Forish District	Bogʻdon
5	Gʻallaorol District	Gʻallaorol
6	Sharof Rashidov District	Uchtepa
7	Mirzachoʻl District	Gagarin
8	Paxtakor District	Paxtakor
9	Yangiobod District	Balandchaqir
10	Zomin District	Zomin
11	Zafarobod District	Zafarobod
12	Zarbdor District	Zarbdor

There are 6 cities (Jizzakh, Gʻallaorol, Doʻstlik, Dashtobod, Gagarin, Paxtakor) and 42 urban-type settlements in the Jizzakh Region.

== Demographics ==
=== Permanent population ===
The permanent population of Jizzakh region was 1,352,100 at the January 1, 2019, grew by 27,100 people or increased by 2.0%. Urbanisation was 46.9% (634,300 cities population and 53,1% or 717,800 rural population) in the beginning of 2019.

Analysis by district shows that the largest population was in Sh. Rashidov district of 213,000 inhabitants (15.8% of population) and in Jizzakh city with 174,000 inhabitants (12.9%); the smallest population is Arnasay with 45,000 people (3.3%) and Yangiabad with 27,000 people (2.0%) in the district, as of 1 January 2019.

By district, the highest population growth rate is for the corresponding period of 2017: 15.8% in Sh. Rashidov district, 12.9% in Jizzakh city, 12.4% in Gʻallaorol district, 11.8% in Arnasay district, and 3.3% in Yangiabad district.

=== Migration ===
Migrants across the region between January and December 2018 numbered about 11,000, and emigrants numbered about 12,000. The migration balance was minus 800 persons. The higher the migration balance level was in Pakhtakor (minus 400 persons) in the city of Jizzakh (minus 300 persons).
