= Kazakhstan–Uzbekistan border =

International border

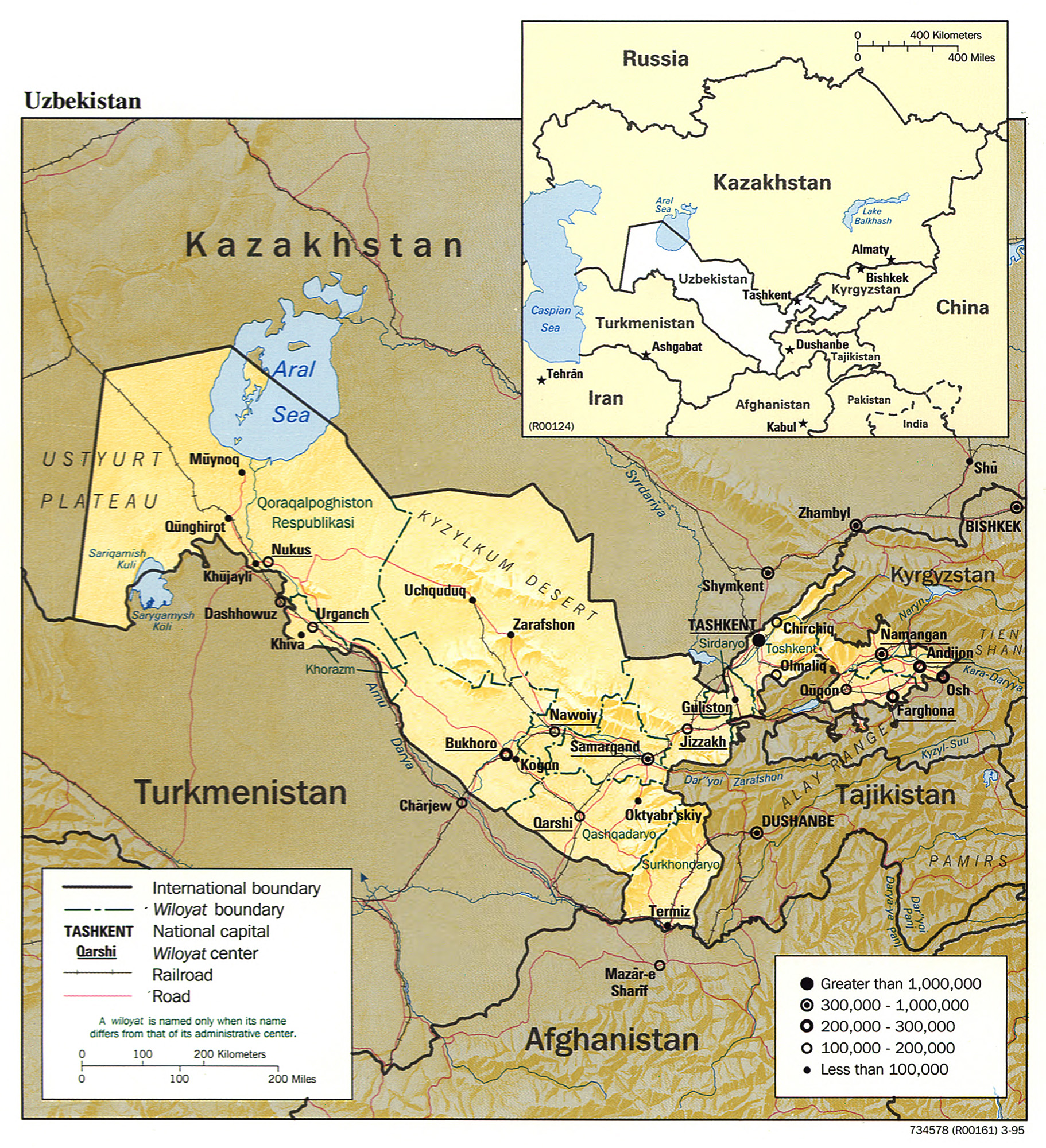
Map of Uzbekistan with Kazakhstan to the north

Kazakhstani and Uzbek boundary markers

The Kazakhstan–Uzbekistan border is 2,330 km (1,450 mi) long and runs from the tripoint with Turkmenistan to the tripoint with Kyrgyzstan. It is Uzbekistan's longest external boundary. The Uzbek capital Tashkent is situated just 13 km (8.1 mi) from this border.

== Description ==
The border begins in the west at the tripoint with Turkmenistan; it then follows the 56th meridian east for about 410 km (250 mi) up to the 45th parallel north. There a straight line of 213 km (132 mi) goes north-east, followed by another straight line section of 128 km (80 mi). This latter section cuts through the Aral Sea and the former Vozrozhdeniya Island (now part of the mainland) which straddle the boundary; the sea was formerly much larger but was severely depleted by Soviet-era irrigation schemes. The central section of the boundary consists of a series of short straight line segments going roughly eastwards through the Kyzylkum Desert, down to the vicinity of Kazakhstan's Shardara Dam. The border then follows a u-shape at Kazakhstan's Maktaaral District before proceeding in a roughly north-eastwards direction past Tashkent and then along the Ugam Range to the Kyrgyz tripoint.

The western two-thirds of the border are sparsely populated and traverse largely desert areas, in stark contrast to the eastern third which is densely populated, containing some of the largest towns in Uzbekistan and southern Kazakhstan. The easternmost section is mountainous and contains a series of national parks (Sayram-Ugam National Park and Aksu-Zhabagly Nature Reserve in Kazakhstan and Ugam-Chatkal National Park in Uzbekistan). Uzbekistan's Jizzakh to Sirdaryo railway crosses through Kazakhstan briefly, a legacy of the Soviet era where infrastructure was built without regard to what were then internal boundaries.

== History ==
The Russian Empire had conquered Central Asia in the 19th century, by annexing the formerly independent Khanates of Kokand and Khiva and the Emirate of Bukhara. After the Communists took power in 1917 and created the Soviet Union it was decided to divide Central Asia into ethnically-based republics in a process known as National Territorial Delimitation (or NTD). This was in line with Communist theory that nationalism was a necessary step on the path towards an eventually communist society, and Joseph Stalin’s definition of a nation as being "a historically constituted, stable community of people, formed on the basis of a common language, territory, economic life, and psychological make-up manifested in a common culture".

The NTD is commonly portrayed as being nothing more than a cynical exercise in divide and rule, a deliberately Machiavellian attempt by Stalin to maintain Soviet hegemony over the region by artificially dividing its inhabitants into separate nations and with borders deliberately drawn so as to leave minorities within each state. Though indeed the Soviets were concerned at the possible threat of pan-Turkic nationalism, as expressed for example with the Basmachi movement of the 1920s, closer analysis informed by the primary sources paints a much more nuanced picture than is commonly presented.

The Soviets aimed to create ethnically homogeneous republics, however many areas were ethnically-mixed (e.g. the Ferghana Valley) and it often proved difficult to assign a ‘correct’ ethnic label to some peoples (e.g. the mixed Tajik-Uzbek Sart, or the various Turkmen/Uzbek tribes along the Amu Darya). Local national elites strongly argued (and in many cases overstated) their case and the Soviets were often forced to adjudicate between them, further hindered by a lack of expert knowledge and the paucity of accurate or up-to-date ethnographic data on the region. Furthermore, NTD also aimed to create ‘viable’ entities, with economic, geographical, agricultural and infrastructural matters also to be taken into account and frequently trumping those of ethnicity. The attempt to balance these contradictory aims within an overall nationalist framework proved exceedingly difficult and often impossible, resulting in the drawing of often tortuously convoluted borders, multiple enclaves and the unavoidable creation of large minorities who ended up living in the ‘wrong’ republic. Additionally the Soviets never intended for these borders to become international frontiers as they are today.

Soviet Central Asia in 1922 before national delimitation

NTD of the area along ethnic lines had been proposed as early as 1920. At this time Central Asia consisted of two Autonomous Soviet Socialist Republics (ASSRs) within the Russian SFSR: the Turkestan ASSR, created in April 1918 and covering large parts of what are now southern Kazakhstan, Uzbekistan and Tajikistan, as well as Turkmenistan, and the Kirghiz Autonomous Soviet Socialist Republic (Kirghiz ASSR, Kirgizistan ASSR on the map), which was created on 26 August 1920 in the territory roughly coinciding with the northern part of today's Kazakhstan (at this time Kazakhs were referred to as ‘Kyrgyz’ and what are now the Kyrgyz were deemed a sub-group of the Kazakhs and referred to as ‘Kara-Kyrgyz’ i.e. mountain-dwelling ‘black-Kyrgyz’). There were also the two separate successor ‘republics’ of the Emirate of Bukhara and the Khanate of Khiva, which were transformed into the Bukhara and Khorezm People's Soviet Republics following the takeover by the Red Army in 1920.

On 25 February 1924 the Politburo and Central Committee of the Soviet Union announced that it would proceed with NTD in Central Asia. The process was to be overseen by a Special Committee of the Central Asian Bureau, with three sub-committees for each of what were deemed to be the main nationalities of the region (Kazakhs, Turkmen and Uzbeks), with work then exceedingly rapidly. There were initial plans to possibly keep the Khorezm and Bukhara PSRs, however it was eventually decided to partition them in April 1924, over the often vocal opposition of their Communist Parties (the Khorezm Communists in particular were reluctant to destroy their PSR and had to be strong-armed into voting for their own dissolution in July of that year).

The creation of the Kazakh-Uzbek border proved particularly difficult in the Syr-Darya Oblast, a densely settled area where populations were mixed. Both Uzbeks and Kazakhs claimed the cities of Turkistan, Chinaz and Shymkent; Tashkent – a predominantly Uzbek city surrounded by Kazakh areas – proved particularly troublesome, with the Central Asian Bureau eventually being forced to decide on the matter, awarding the city to Uzbekistan. Kazakhstan however gained the large city of Shymkent.

A further complication were the Karakalpaks; the Soviets were unsure if they were Uzbeks, Kazakhs or a separate nationality altogether. Given the at-best weak sense of Karakalpak nationality, and their perceived closer links to the Kazakhs, they were given their own Karakalpak Autonomous Oblast within the Kazakh ASSR. This oblast was larger than the modern autonomous Republic of Karakalpakstan and extended considerably further eastwards, thereby cutting the Uzbek SSR in two, with a small exclave around Khiva. Poor economic performance in the oblast convinced Soviet leaders that Karakalpakstan should be included directly the Russian SSR, a move formalised in 1930; it was upgraded to ASSR status in 1932. In 1936 the area was transferred to the Uzbek SSR.

Map of Uzbekistan from 1940, showing slight differences in the border

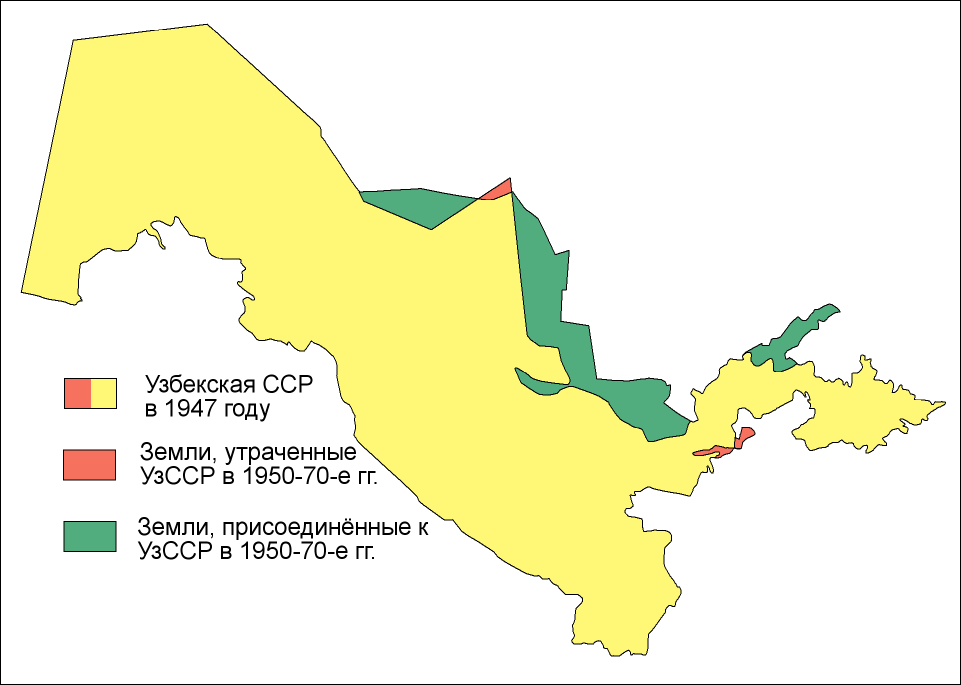
Map of Uzbek SSR, showing territorial losses and gains along the then internal soviet boundaries, especially along the Northeastern frontier with Kazakh SSR

It appears that there were various small changes to the border in the following decades. Many older maps show a slightly different boundary in the Kara-Kum desert, with a large triangular protrusion of Uzbek territory into what is now Kazakhstan's Kyzylorda Region (see maps right). According to the Resolution of the Presidium of the Supreme Soviet of the USSR of February 13, 1956, Mirzachoʻl desert and Boʻstonliq District was separated from Kazakh SSR (South Kazakhstan Region) and added to Uzbek SSR along its northeastern frontiers. In 1963, in accordance with the decision of the Presidium of the Supreme Soviet of the USSR, an additional 36,600 square kilometers of territory was transferred from South Kazakhstan and Kyzylorda regions of Kazakh SSR.

The boundary became an international frontier in 1991 following the dissolution of the Soviet Union and the independence of its constituent republics. There were various tensions around the border – especially in the Tashkent area - in the late 1990s-early 2000s, with Kazakhstan accusing Uzbekistan of unilaterally demarcating and militarising the border; eventually in 2001 the two governments agreed to begin a full delimitation of the border.

The process of delimiting the Kazakhstan-Uzbekistan border took place from 2000 to 2002 and presented challenges due to 200 km of densely populated border areas, such as the Saryagash and Maktaaral Districts in South Kazakhstan Region and the Tashkent and Jizzakh regions in Uzbekistan. Specific difficulties arose in defining the borderline, as previous agreements had placed the boundary along the Keles River. Seasonal flooding altered the river’s path, leading both countries to agree on marking the border along its current course. Other complexities included sections around the Shardara Reservoir, where lands had been temporarily ceded to Uzbekistan.

One of the most challenging issues was the division of the villages of Bagys and Turkestanets, which sat directly on the border. A review of historical maps revealed inconsistencies: Bagys, which was not listed on maps from the 1940s and 1960s despite being inhabited, lay across the boundary. Residents of Bagys and Turkestanets expressed a preference to remain in Kazakhstan. While Uzbekistan made no claims to Bagys, it noted that Turkestanets had been under the jurisdiction of its Ministry of Defense since the collapse of the USSR. Ultimately, Bagys was integrated into Kazakhstan, and residents of Turkestanets who wished to stay in Kazakhstan relocated. An exchange of 517 hectares of mountainous pastures in the Bagys area for semi-desert lands near the villages of Nysan-1, Nysan-2, and Baimurat in the Kyzylorda Region helped finalize the agreement. A similar approach resolved other disputes, including those near the Arnasay Dam.

On November 16, 2001, the presidents of Kazakhstan and Uzbekistan signed the Treaty on the Kazakhstan-Uzbekistan State Border, defining 96% of the border. This was followed by the Treaty on Specific Border Sections, signed on September 9, 2002, which fully delineated the shared border. Both agreements took effect on September 5, 2003.

Full demarcation is currently ongoing. On March 28, 2023, both countries finally ratified the border demarcation treaties.

== Border crossings ==
Listed from West to East

Kazakh name	Uzbek name	Road	Type of crossing	Coordinates
Tazhen (east of Beyneu)	Dauta Ata (near Karakalpakia)	M-380	international road and rail	
Seliny/17 Post (near Baybota)	Akaltyn	M-39	international road	
Erkinadad	Malik	M-39	international road	
Sirdaryo	Keden (near Atakent)	R-35	bilateral road	
Konysbayeva (near Kara-Tobe)	Yallama (near Chinoz)	adjacent to M-39	international road	
Kaplanbek	Navoy (near Saryagash)	-	international road and rail	
Jibek Joly	Gisht Kuprik	A-2	international road (temporarily closed until September 2026	
May	Kazykurt	adjacent to A-2	international road	

== Settlements near the border ==
=== Kazakhstan ===
- Chabankazgan
- Shardara
- Zhetisay
- Myrzakent
- Atakent
- Saryagash

=== Uzbekistan ===
- Qaraqalpaqstan
- Gagarin
- Guliston
- Baxt
- Sirdaryo
- Chinoz
- Yangiyoʻl
- Tashkent
- Keles
- Chirchiq
- Gʻazalkent

== See also ==
- Uzbekistan
- Turkmenistan–Uzbekistan border
