= Bagistanes =

Ancient Persian military leader

Bagistanes (Ancient Greek: Βαγιστάνης) was a distinguished man of ancient Babylon, who lived in the 4th century BCE.

He was a part of the group of Achaemenid Bessus that conspired to depose the Persian king Darius III. When Alexander the Great was in pursuit of them, in 330 BCE, Bagistanes, with Antibelus, abandoned his fellow conspirators, and informed Alexander of the danger of Darius, who was shortly thereafter murdered by the conspirators.

Some scholars posit that he may not actually have been Babylonian, and that his Babylonian ethnicity was merely inferred by later writers from his titles and social context. Some speculation comes from the fact that "Bagistanes" is not a typically Babylonian name. It has been suggested he was instead a man from Bagistan (modern Bogʻiston) who was merely employed by the Babylonian empire.
