= Bogʻiston =

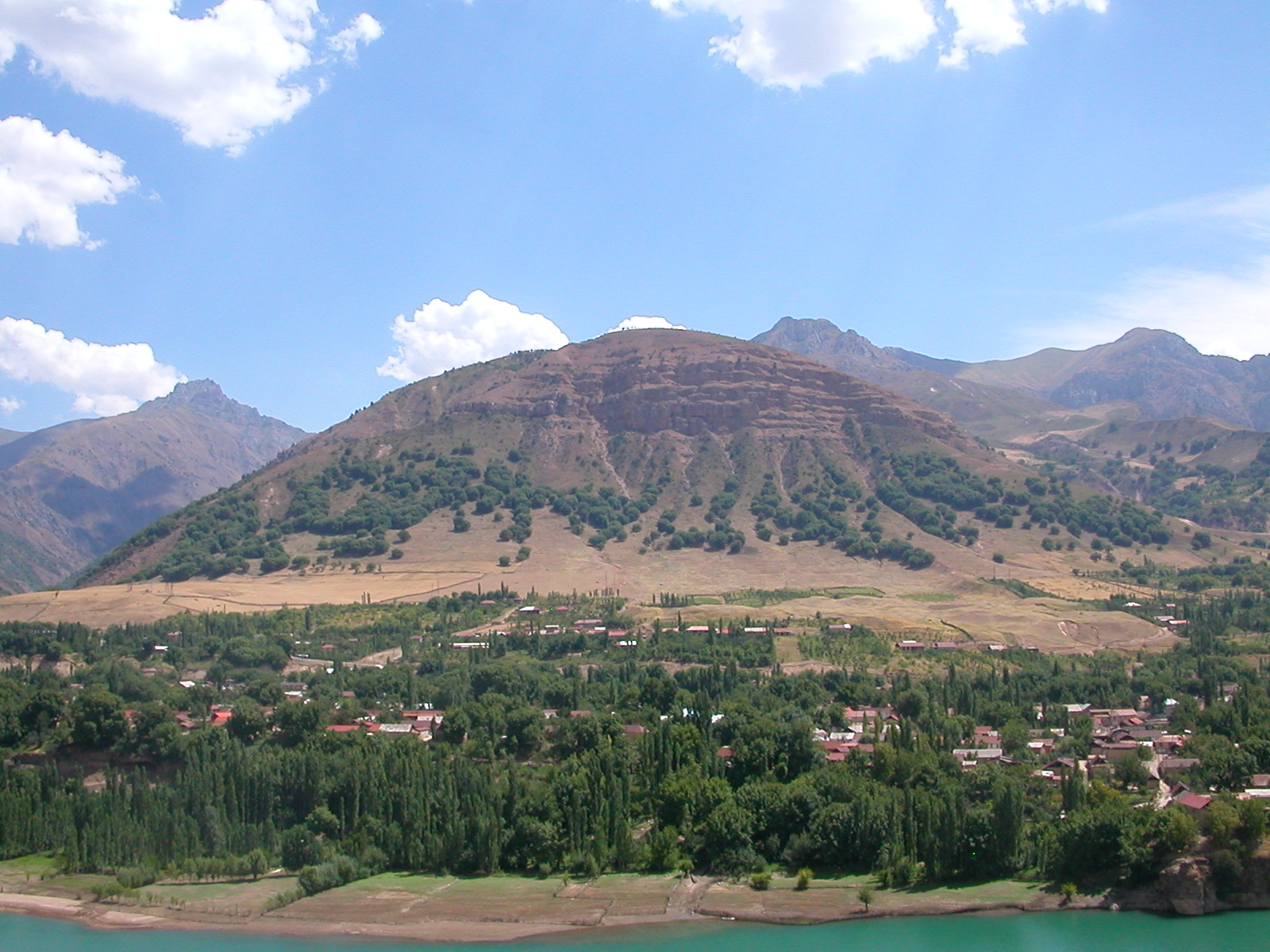
- Bogʻiston lies on the river Pskem

- Location in Uzbekistan
- Coordinates: 41°41′0″N 70°5′0″E
- Country: Uzbekistan
- Region: Tashkent Region
- District: Boʻstonliq District

Population (1999)
  - Total: 2,000

Bogʻiston (Uzbek: Bogʻiston, Russian: Богустан, romanized: Bogustan), also written as Bagistan, is a village located in the Boʻstonliq District of the Tashkent Region of Uzbekistan. It lies at the southeast of the Charvak Reservoir at 960 m a.s.l. of western extremity of the Koksu Ridge (West Tien Shan). Practically Bogʻiston nestles among verdure ashore the river Pskem where it flows into the Charvak Reservoir. "Bog-i Ston" is Tajik for "Land of orchards".

== Population ==
The population of the village is 2,000 people and they speak Tajik language. The local population lives owing to natural economy: agrarian production, cattle breeding and fruit collection. Nearby villages in the area are as follows: Brichmulla - 4,100 people, Yakkatut - 3,100 people, Yanghikurgan - 700 people, Yusufhona - 500, Yubileiniy - 1,200, Baladala - 1,800 and Nanai - 3,800 people.

== History ==
The village origin dates back to the 6th century A.D. That was period of rise of Turkic Khaganate (552 - 745), when settlements and fortified castles began to appear in the foothills and hilly area of Chirchik River. In the Middle Ages mountain routes leading from Semerechie and Ferghana to Chach (Tashkent) converged on the populated area inclusive Bogʻiston.

Bogʻiston has had two notable residents. The most known Sheikh Hovendi at-Tahur (Sheihantaur) was born here at the end of the 13th century. He was a Sayyid, meaning that he claimed descent from the Quraish, the tribe of Muhammad. His father, Sheikh Umar, was believed to be a direct descendant in the seventeenth generation of the second godly Caliph Umar ibn al-Khattab, therefore male members of this family also bore the famous title of Khoja & Arif (Khwaja). Sheikh Khoja Umar was a devoted Sufi and one of the followers of Dervish Hasan Bulgari. He arrived in Tashkent with a mission to disseminate Islam. Then he went to Bogʻiston, where at the end of his life Sheikh Khodja Umar has been buried ashore Pscem River. Young Sheihantaur was initiated into the Yasaviyya order of Dervishes in the town of Yasi (now Turkestan in modern-day Kazakhstan) where already at that time the Sufi Sheikh Khoja Ahmad Yasavi, the founder of the order, was revered. After long wanderings around Ma wara'u'n-nahr, Sheihantaur came to Tashkent where he remained in the memory of the people as the wisest of the wise. He died sometime between 1355 and 1360 in Tashkent.

== Cultural attractions ==
The burial place of Sheikh Khodja Umar is one of the sacred places of Tashkent province. Unsophisticated arrangement of this place enables be carried away to the history of monuments at another places (such as Sheihantaur necropolis in Tashkent) that has been lost or extravagantly embroidered recently.

The village has well kept traditions and customs of mountain Tajiks. The dish "Hashkak", the honey with nuts and "Urosh", the yogurt with spices are considered as distinctive feature of cookery.

== Climate and seasons ==
The climate of the area is favorable. Surrounding foothills and the Charvak water reservoir, which moistures and cools down the air in summer (+30 °C), are most important factors that have an influence on the climate of the area. However, the cold weather is more perceptible in winter (up to −25 °C). The rain mainly falls in spring and autumn. The best season for the beachfront tourism is July–August, for horse-riding and hiking - late April and early October.

== Accessibility ==
Bogʻiston is located 125 km / 77,7 mi (about 2.5 hour drive) away from Tashkent. There are two ways of reaching the village from Tashkent: via the dam of the Charvak water reservoir or via pass Melovoy and the Chimgan recreation area. The nearest railway station is located close to the village of Khodjikent.

== See also ==
- Mausoleum of Sheihantaur in Tashkent
- Tourism in Uzbekistan
