= Kal'makyr mine =

Copper mine in Tashkent, Uzbekistan

- Interactive map of Kal'makyr mine
- Location: Tashkent Province, Uzbekistan
- Products: Copper

The Kal'makyr mine is a large copper mine located in the east of Uzbekistan in Tashkent Province. Kal'makyr represents one of the largest copper reserves in Uzbekistan and the world. It has estimated reserves of 2.5 billion tonnes of ore grading 0.38% copper and 40 million oz of gold.
