= Charvak =

Charvak may refer to the following:

- Charvaka, a system of Indian philosophy
- Lake Charvak, an artificial lake in Uzbekistan
- Charvak, a journalist, activist and professor in India. See Charvak Mukhopadhyay
