= Pskem =

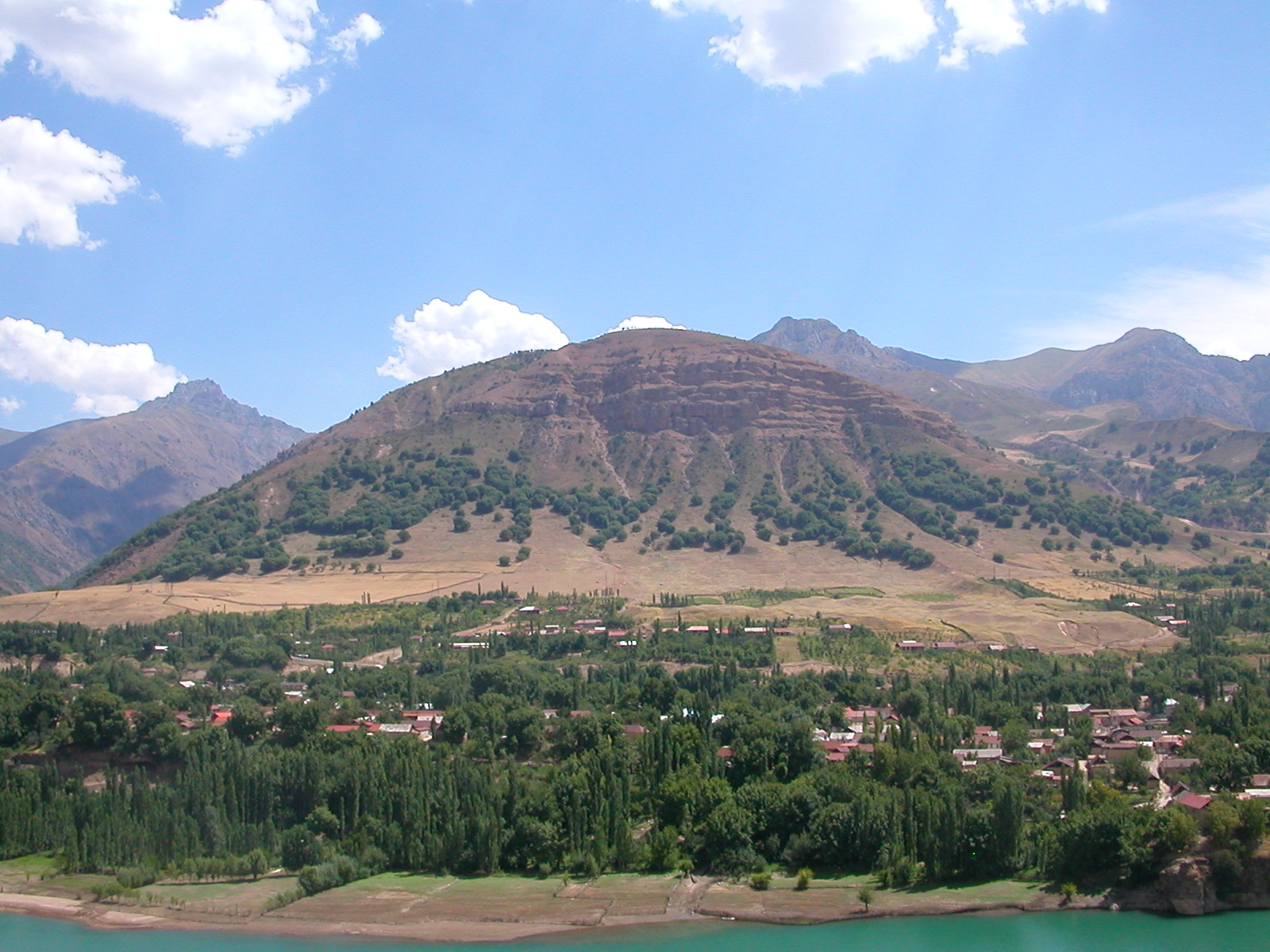
- The Pskem and the village of Bogʻiston

Location
- Country: Uzbekistan

Physical characteristics
- Mouth: Chirchiq
  - location: Lake Charvak
  - coordinates: 41.7009°N 70.0888°E
- Length: 149 km (93 mi)
- Basin size: 2,830 km^{2} (1,090 sq mi)

Basin features
- Progression: Chirchiq→ Syr Darya→ North Aral Sea

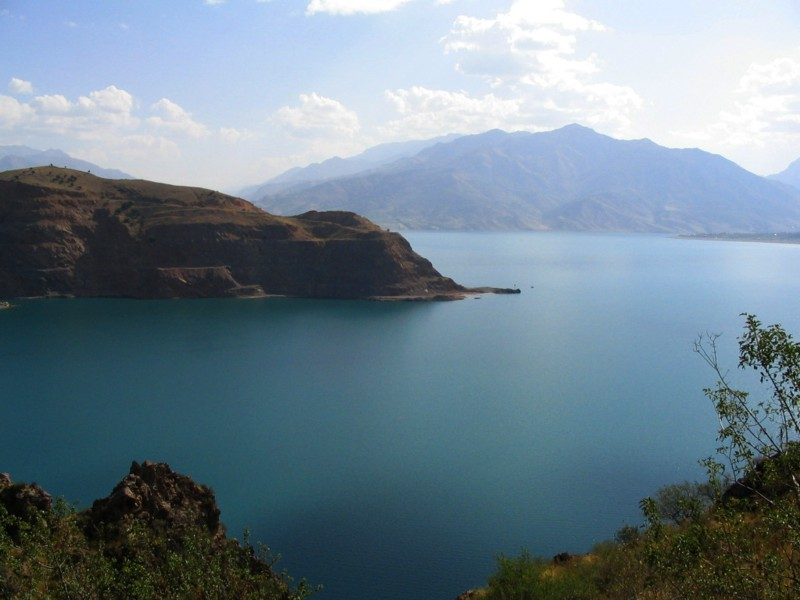
The river flows into Lake Charvak

The Pskem (Russian: Пскем) or Piskom (Uzbek: Piskom) is a river of Tashkent Region in Uzbekistan in the Pskem Mountains.

The river runs for 149 km (93 mi) (including its source river Oygaying) southwest with a basin area of 2,830 km^{2} (1,090 sq mi). The origins of the river Pskem are in the glaciers of the Talas Alatau range in Kazakhstan. In the upper reaches of the river it flows through a narrow rocky gorge, and then travels more than 40 km (25 mi) through the Pskem Valley. The river valley is bounded by Ugam Range (north) and Pskem Range (south). On the banks of the river in the valley are thickets of shrubs and apple, pear, apricot and plum trees, along with small groves of walnut. The river banks are home to notable populations of porcupine, fox, marmots, wild pigs and brown bear, as well as many species of birds.

The river empties into the Lake Charvak, which is drained by the river Chirchiq. Its tributaries are the Aksarsoy and other rivers. Tourism has increased in the area in recent years with rafting and kayaking on the river.
