= Chorvoq =

Chorvoq Чoрвoқ
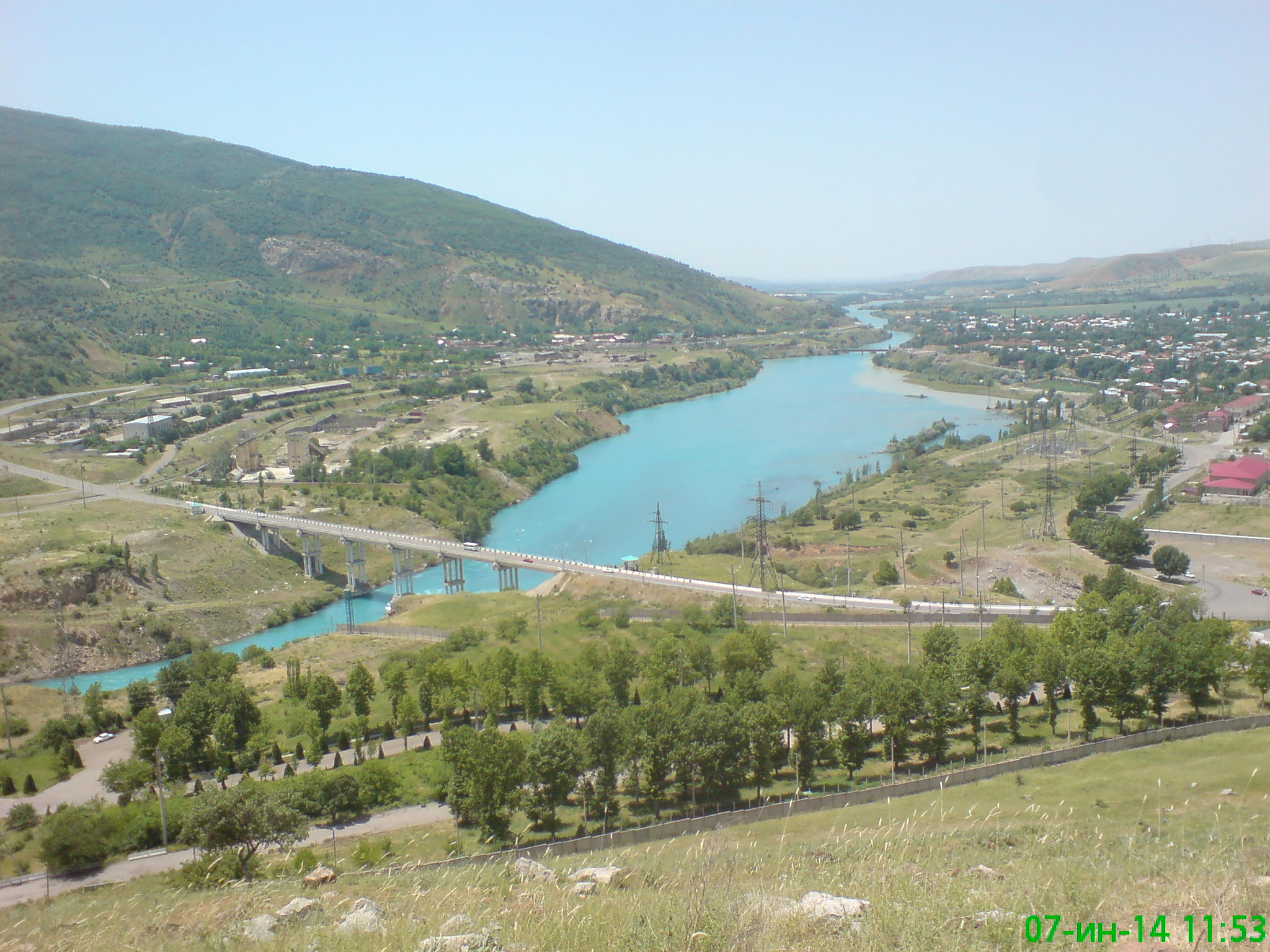
- Chorvoq, Uzbekistan

- Location in Uzbekistan
- Coordinates: 41°38′00″N 69°56′30″E
- Country: Uzbekistan
- Region: Tashkent Region
- District: Boʻstonliq District

Chorvoq (Uzbek: Chorvoq, Russian: Чарвак, romanized: Charvak) is an urban-type settlement in Boʻstonliq District, Tashkent Region, Uzbekistan. The town is 575 metres above sea level and lies on the river Chirchiq, downstream from Lake Charvak, an irrigation and hydroelectric facility.

== History ==
The 168-meter-high rock fill dam at Chorvoq was built in 1970. The lake Charvak reservoir was formed by the rivers of Mount Pskem, Kok Su and Chatkal.

On the land of the lake there were formerly some settlements, valleys, testimonials of early people, petroglyphs and other historical sights. But it was a time of extreme lack of cheap and environmentally sustainable power after the catastrophic 1966 earthquake, when the whole U.S.S.R. undertook to reconstruct Tashkent. The government then agreed to set up the Charvak hydroelectric power station (they had no more suitable location for that purpose). Researches of any thing, images and more than 150 monuments in that region were carried out by archaeologists and historians. 40 years after, most of these attractions are now under deposits of dirt and sludge.

== Gallery ==
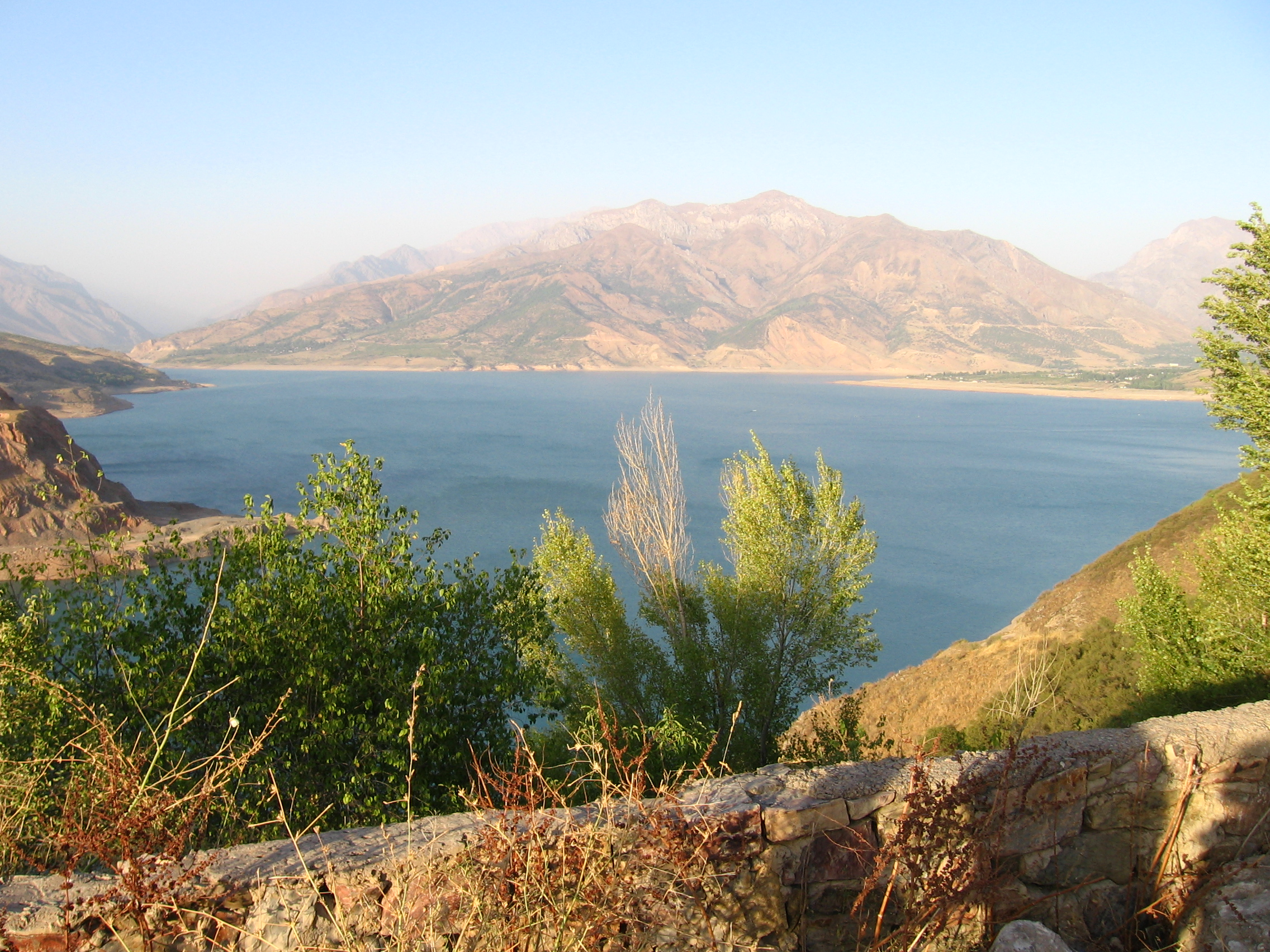
Panoramic view of Charvak

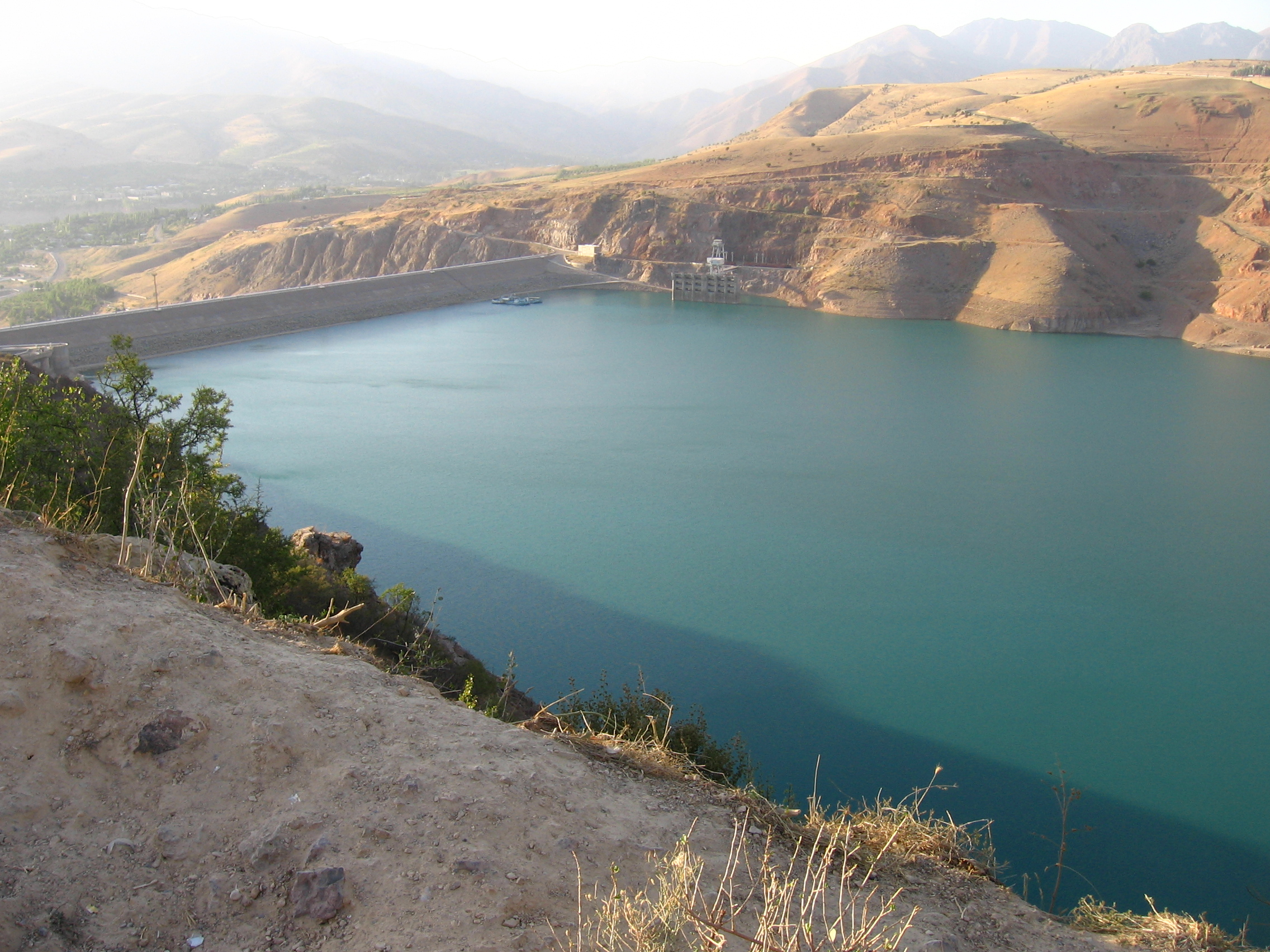
Charvak dam

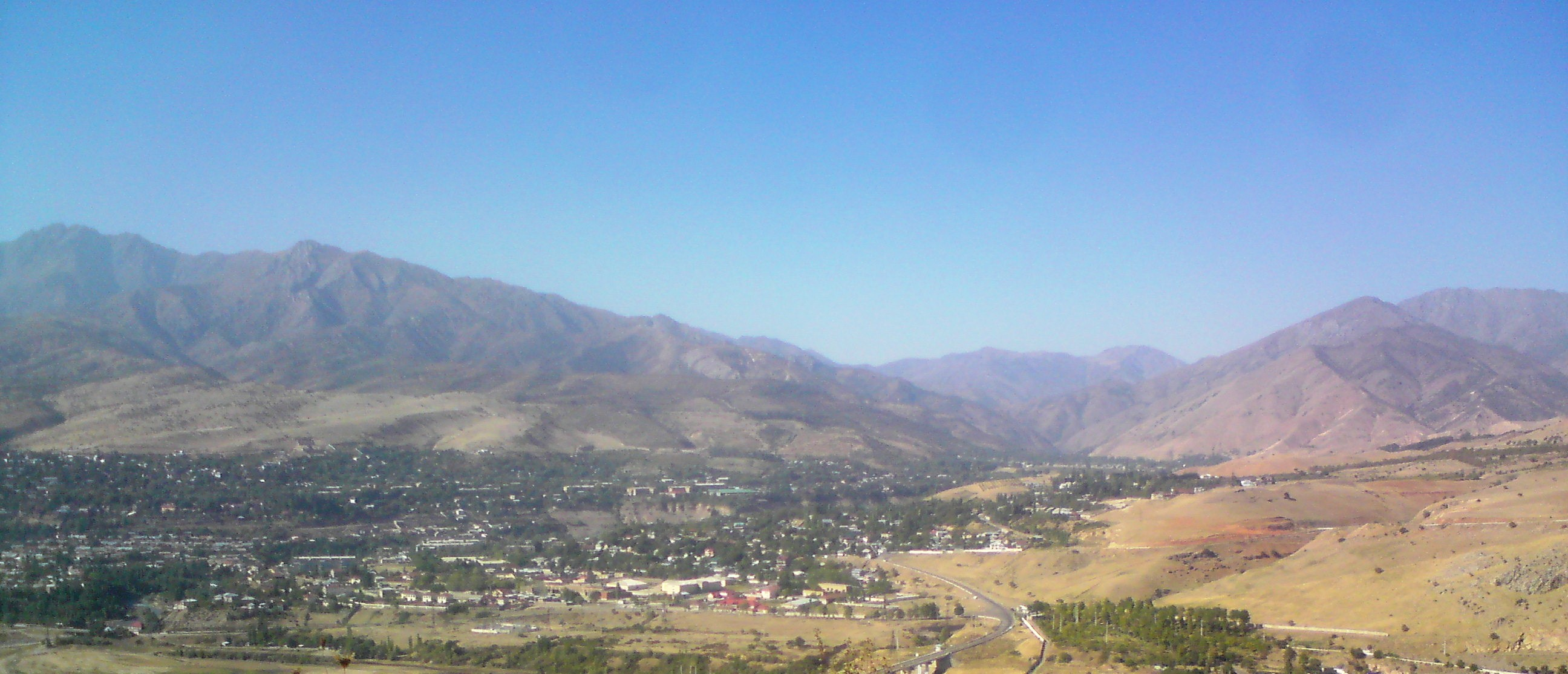
Ugam Mountains near Charvak

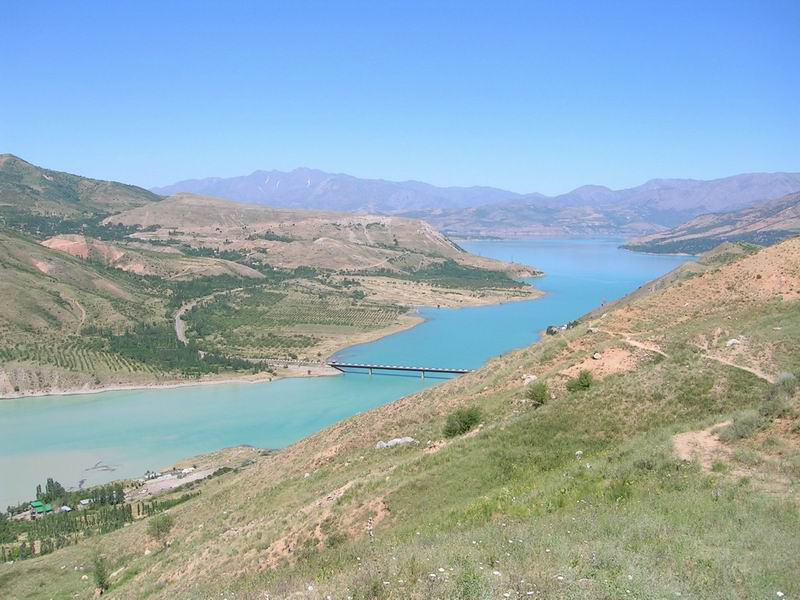
Countryside near Charvak

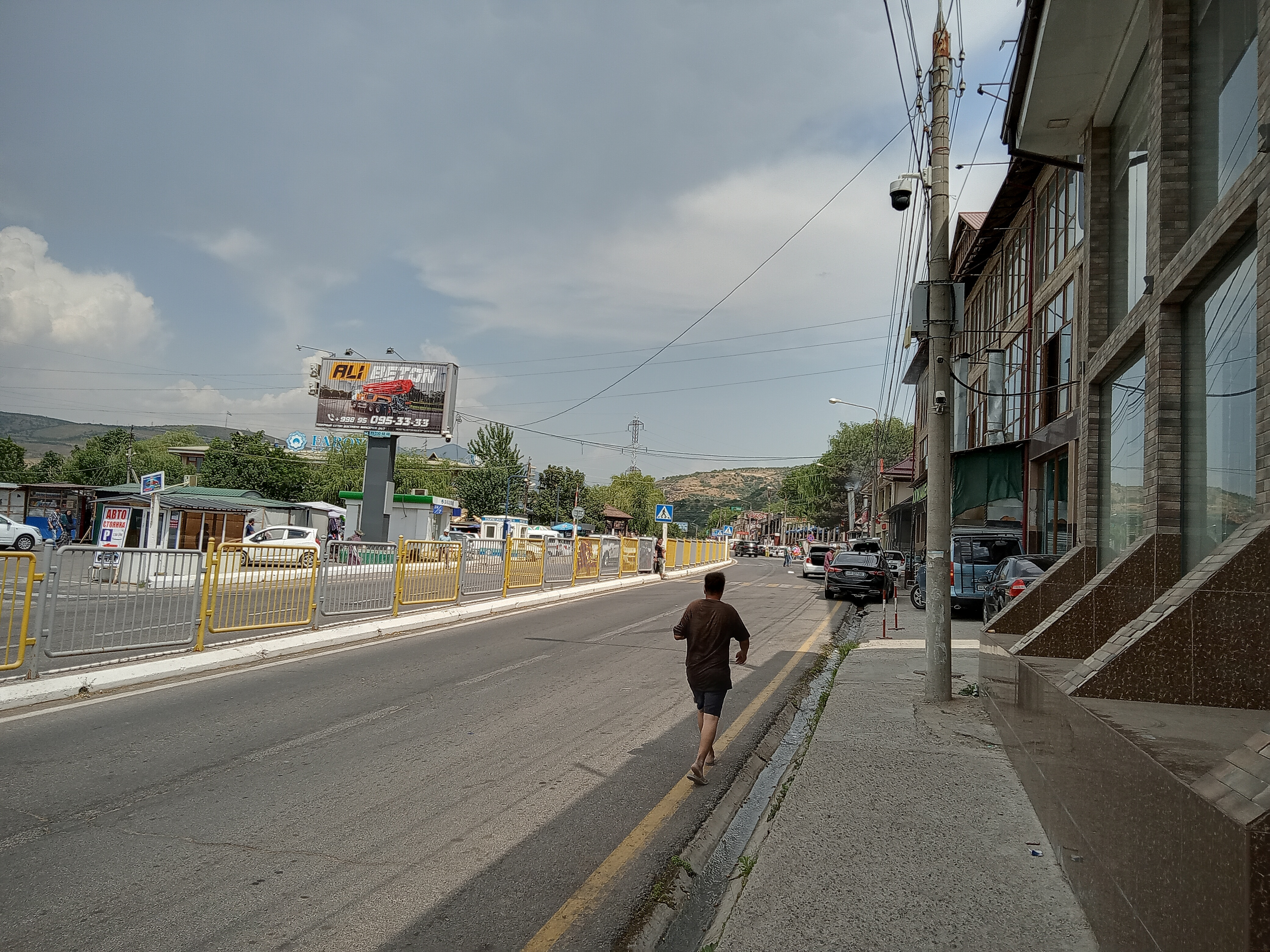
A street in Charvak
