= Iskandar (town) =

Iskandar Iskandar
- Location in Uzbekistan
- Coordinates: 41°33′29″N 69°42′17″E
- Country: Uzbekistan
- Region: Tashkent Region
- District: Boʻstonliq District

Population (1989)
  - Total: 26,161
- Time zone: UTC+5 (UZT)

Iskandar (Uzbek: Iskandar / Искандар) is an urban-type settlement in Tashkent Region, Uzbekistan. It is part of Boʻstonliq District. In 1989 the town's population was 26,161 people.
