= 1968 Chirchik events =

Cultural demonstration by exiled Crimean Tatars

- Date: 21 April 1968
- Location: Chirchik, Uzbekistan
- Arrests: 300

The 1968 Chirchik events happened on 21 April 1968 in Chirchik (now part of Uzbekistan). Several Crimean Tatars gathered there to celebrate Derviza and Vladimir Lenin's birthday, but the authorities cracked down on the gathering.

== Summary of events ==
On 21 April 1968, a crowd of Crimean Tatars in exile attempted to hold a public gathering in the city park of Chirchik to celebrate the spring Derviza holiday as well as Lenin's birthday. A wreath thanking Lenin for the Crimean ASSR was placed at a statue of Lenin, and parkgoers sang Crimean Tatar songs throughout the day. However, city and republic-level government authorities refused to give permission for the festivities beforehand and subsequently cracked down on the gathering and attempts by Crimean Tatars to attend, arresting an estimated 300 people in the process. Such measures to prevent "an accumulation of Crimean Tatars" included setting up checkpoints on all roads leading to the city to check documents of travellers, mobilizing troops to Chirchik, and deploying fire trucks to spray those gathered in the city park. After the incident the local Chirchik initiative group nearly collapsed.
