= Sarycheku mine =

Copper mine in Tashkent, Uzbekistan

- Interactive map of Sarycheku mine
- Location: Tashkent Province, Uzbekistan; 40°46′32″N 69°46′34″E
- Products: Copper

The Sarycheku mine is a large copper mine located in the east of Uzbekistan in Tashkent Province. Sarycheku represents one of the largest copper reserve in Uzbekistan and in the world having estimated reserves of 200 million tonnes of ore grading 0.5% copper and 0.64 million oz of gold.
