= Dalnee mine =

Copper mine in Tashkent, Uzbekistan

Location
- Location: Tashkent Province, Uzbekistan

Production
- Products: Copper

The Dalnee mine is a large copper mine located in the east of Uzbekistan in Tashkent Province. Dalnee represents one of the largest copper reserve in Uzbekistan and in the world having estimated reserves of 2.8 billion tonnes of ore grading 0.36% copper and 31.4 million oz of gold.
