= Ugam Range =

Mountain range in Kazakhstan and Uzbekistan

Coordinates: 41°57′54″N 70°17′41″E

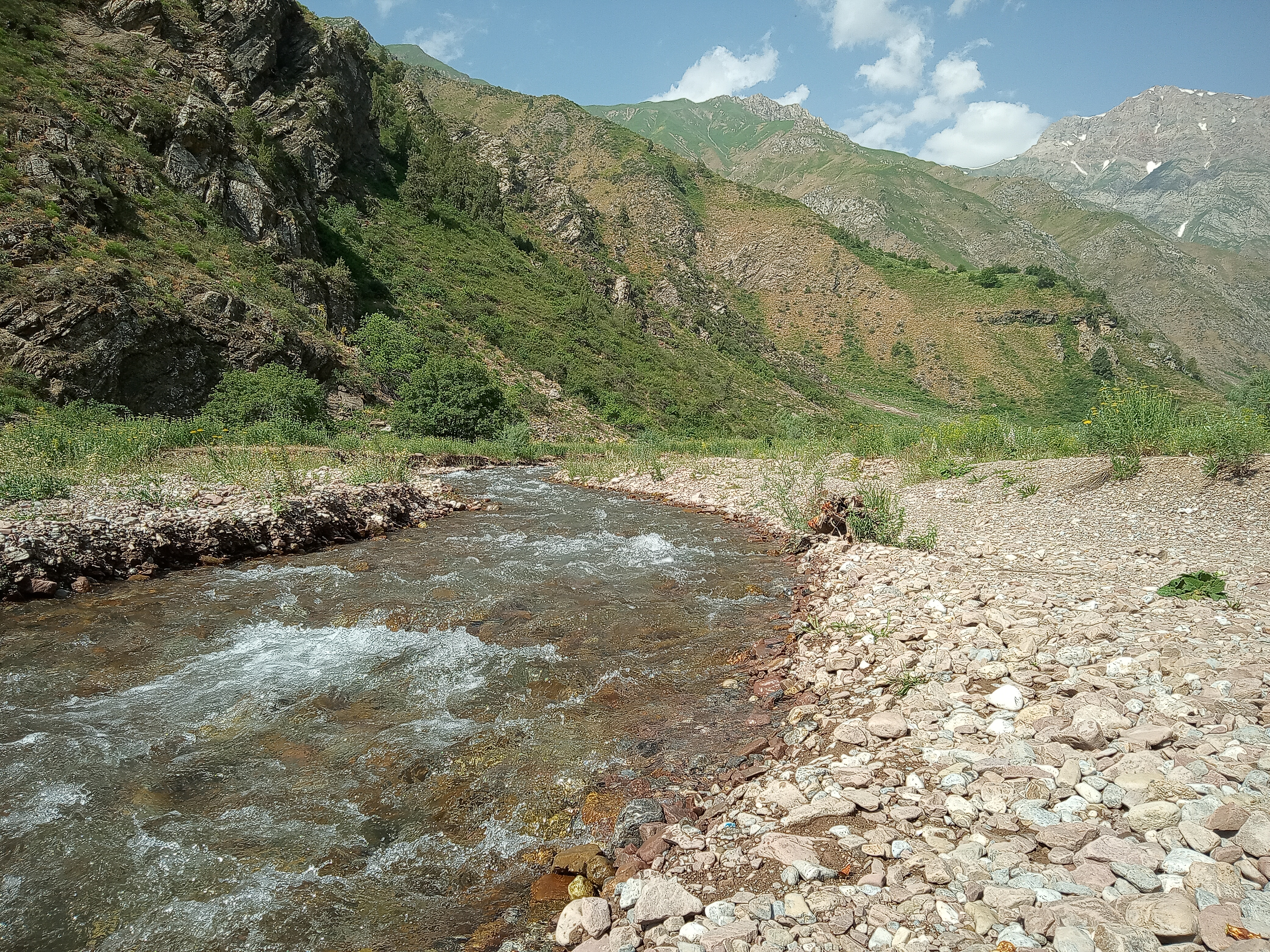
A view of the Ugam Range in northeastern Uzbekistan

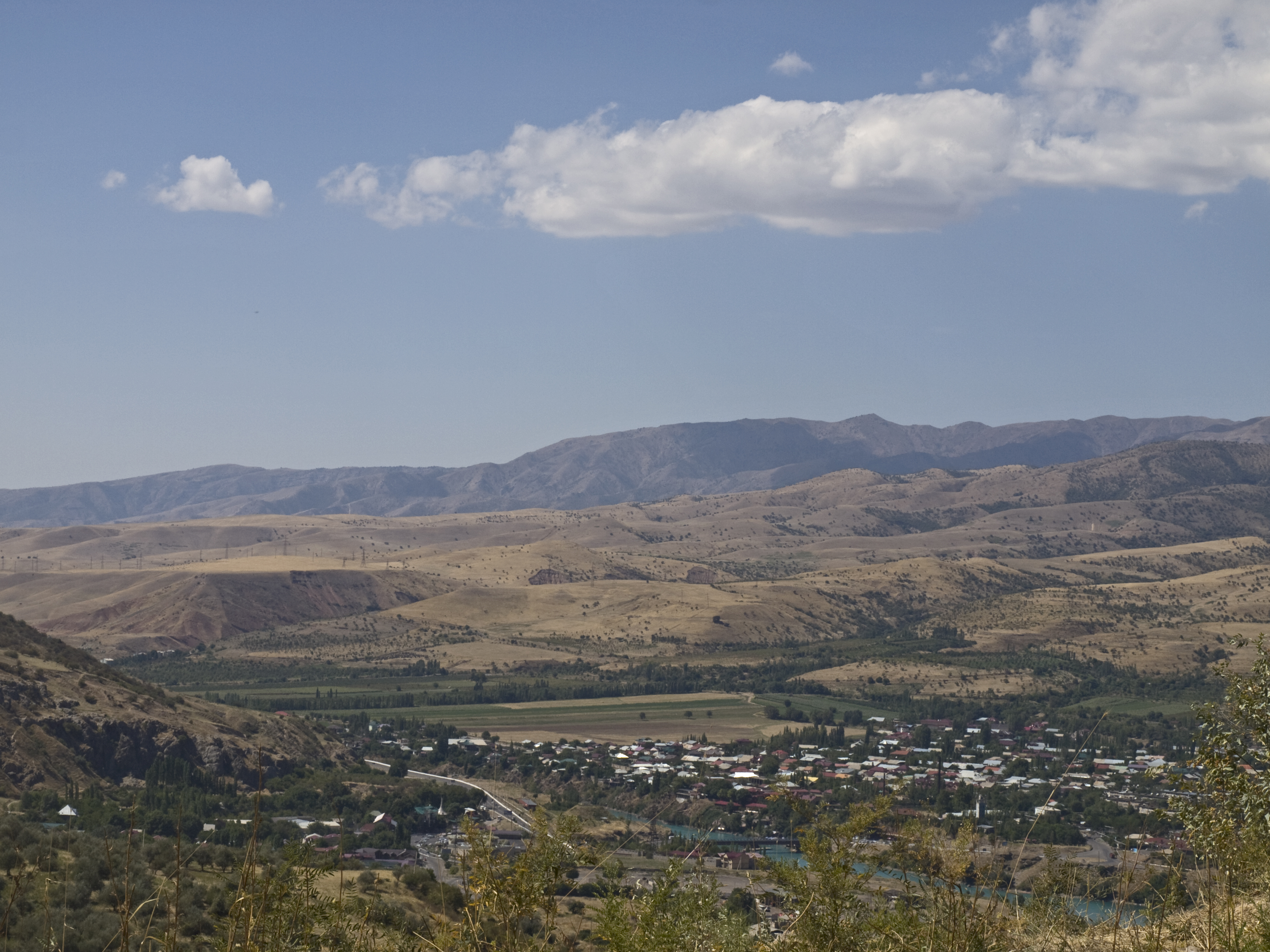
Southern side of the range in Chorvoq

Ugam Range (Kazakh: Өгем жотасы / Ögem jotasy; Uzbek: Ugom tizmasi) is a mountain range in South Kazakhstan Region of Kazakhstan and Tashkent Region in Uzbekistan. It is part of the Western Tian Shan mountains. The range runs from northeast to southwest; in the northeast, it joins the Talas Alatau; in the southwest, it gradually flattens towards the Syr Darya valley. The total length of the range is approximately 100 kilometres (62 mi), and its highest peaks are over 4,000 metres (13,000 ft). It marks the border between Kazakhstan and Uzbekistan.

The Pskem Range runs parallel to the Ugam Range to the south, with the Pskem River valley separating the ranges. The Pskem enters the Charvak Reservoir, whose only outflow is the Chirchiq River, a major right tributary of the Syr Darya. The upper Chirchiq Valley and the reservoir are bounded by the Ugam Range to the north. The rivers on the northern slopes of the range flow into the Ugam River, a right tributary of the Chirchiq.

In Uzbekistan, the Ugam Range is located within Bostanliq District of Tashkent Region. In Kazakhstan, the range is located in both the Tole Bi and Kazygurt Districts of the South Kazakhstan Region.

Ugam-Chatkal National Park is partially located on the southern slopes of the Ugam Range, on the Uzbek side of the border.
