= Lake Charvak =

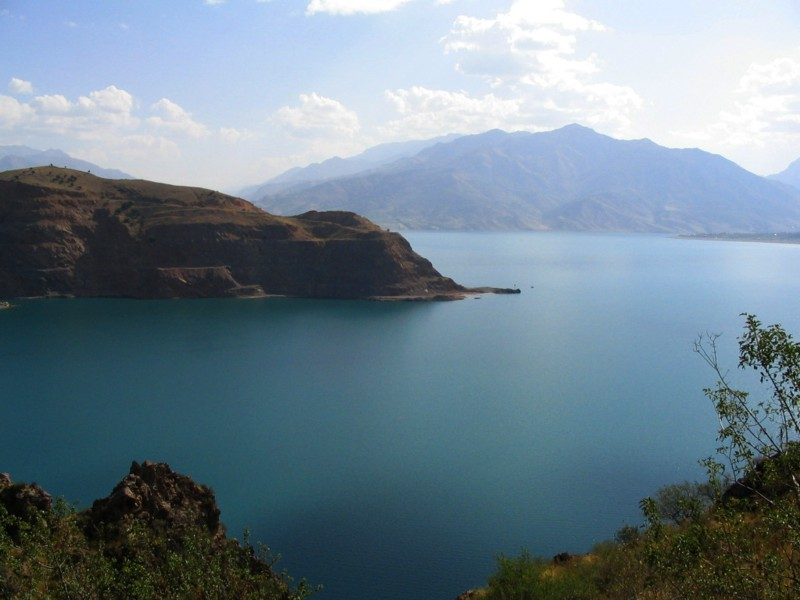

- Location within Uzbekistan
- Interactive map of Lake Charvak
- Location: Tashkent Province
- Coordinates: 41.64°N 70.03°E
- Type: Reservoir
- Primary inflows: Pskem, Chatkal
- Primary outflows: Chirchiq
- Basin countries: Uzbekistan
- Water volume: 2 km^{3} (0.48 cu mi)

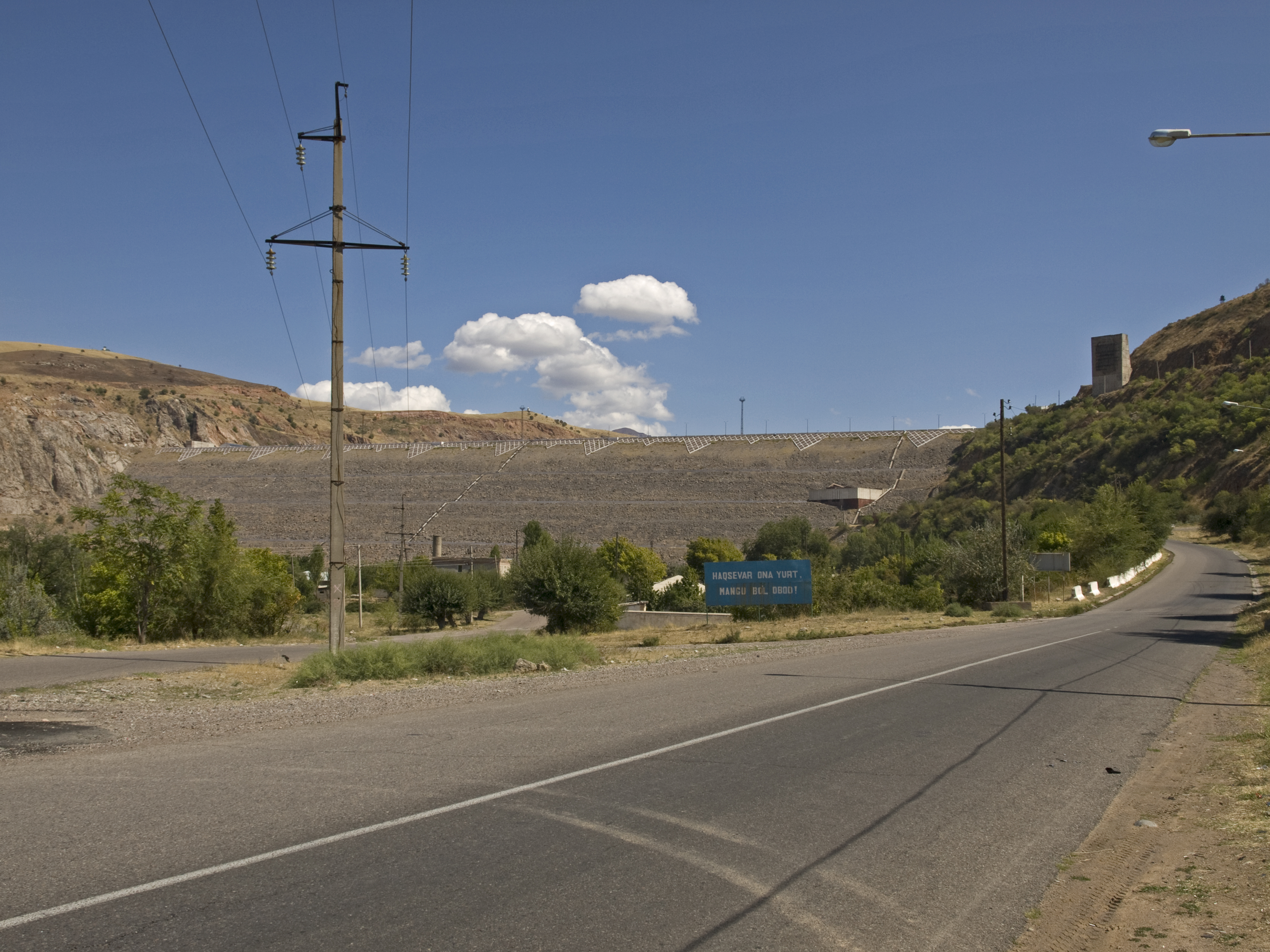
The dam

Lake Charvak (Uzbek: Chorvoq; from چهارباغ Char bagh, "four gardens" in Persian) is a water reservoir in Boʻstonliq District in the northern part of Tashkent Region, Uzbekistan, separating Ugam (north), Pskem (east), and Chatkal (south) ranges. The reservoir was created by erecting a 168 m (551 ft) high stone dam (Charvak Hydropower Station) on the river Chirchiq, a short distance downstream from the confluence of Pskem, Koʻksuv and Chatkal rivers in the western Tian Shan mountains, which provide the main volume of water. Currently the confluence cannot be seen and all three rivers discharge directly into Charvak. The reservoir capacity is 2 km^{3} (0.48 cu mi).

Lake Charvak is the uppermost of the several reservoirs made on the Chirchiq River. Downstream, there are Khodzhikent Reservoir and Gazalkent Reservoir, which have a much smaller area.

The dam construction was started in 1964 and completed in 1970. About 150 archaeological sites were submerged under water when the reservoir was filled up. These sites were investigated by the Institute of History and Archaeology of Uzbekistan before the dam was constructed.

Lake Charvak is a popular resort in Tashkent region and thousands of holiday makers from all over Uzbekistan and neighbouring countries visit the reservoir. Villages on the banks of Charvak such as Yusufhona, Burchmullo, Nanay, Chorvoq, Sidjak, Bogʻiston, and their surroundings offer wide range of hotels, dachas, houses and tapchans to accommodate tourists. Yusufhona is also a popular place among paragliders and provides facilities for this sport.
