= Yusufhona =

Yusufxona
- Village
- Location in Uzbekistan
- Coordinates: 41°37′15″N 70°2′30″E
- Country: Uzbekistan
- Region: Tashkent Region
- District: Bostanliq District

Population
  - Total: 500
- Time zone: UTC+5 (UZT)

Yusufhona (Uzbek: Yusufxona/Юсуфхона, Russian: Юсуфхона) is a village in Bostanliq District, Tashkent Region, Uzbekistan.
