= Xoʻjakent =

- Town
- Location in Uzbekistan
- Coordinates: 41°38′N 69°57′E
- Country: Uzbekistan
- Region: Tashkent Region
- District: Boʻstonliq District
- Elevation: 754 m (2,474 ft)

Population (2016)
  - Total: 3,400
- Time zone: UTC+5 (UZT)

Xoʻjakent (Uzbek: Xoʻjakent/Хўжакент) is an urban-type settlement in Boʻstonliq District, Tashkent Region, Uzbekistan. Its population is 3,400 (2016). There is a Xoʻjakent Station on the Tashkent-Xoʻjakent Railway.
