= Ugam-Chatkal National Park =

National park in Uzbekistan

Coordinates: 41°11′N 69°53′E

Ugam-Chatkal National Park (Uzbekistan)

Ugam-Chatkal National Park is a national park in northeastern Uzbekistan, along the border with Kazakhstan. Established in 1992 and covering 668,350 ha (1,651,500 acres), the park is located in mountainous areas of the Bostonliq, Parkent and Ohangaron districts of Tashkent Region.

The Ugam Range runs through the park, attaining elevations of up to 4,000 metres (13,000 ft).

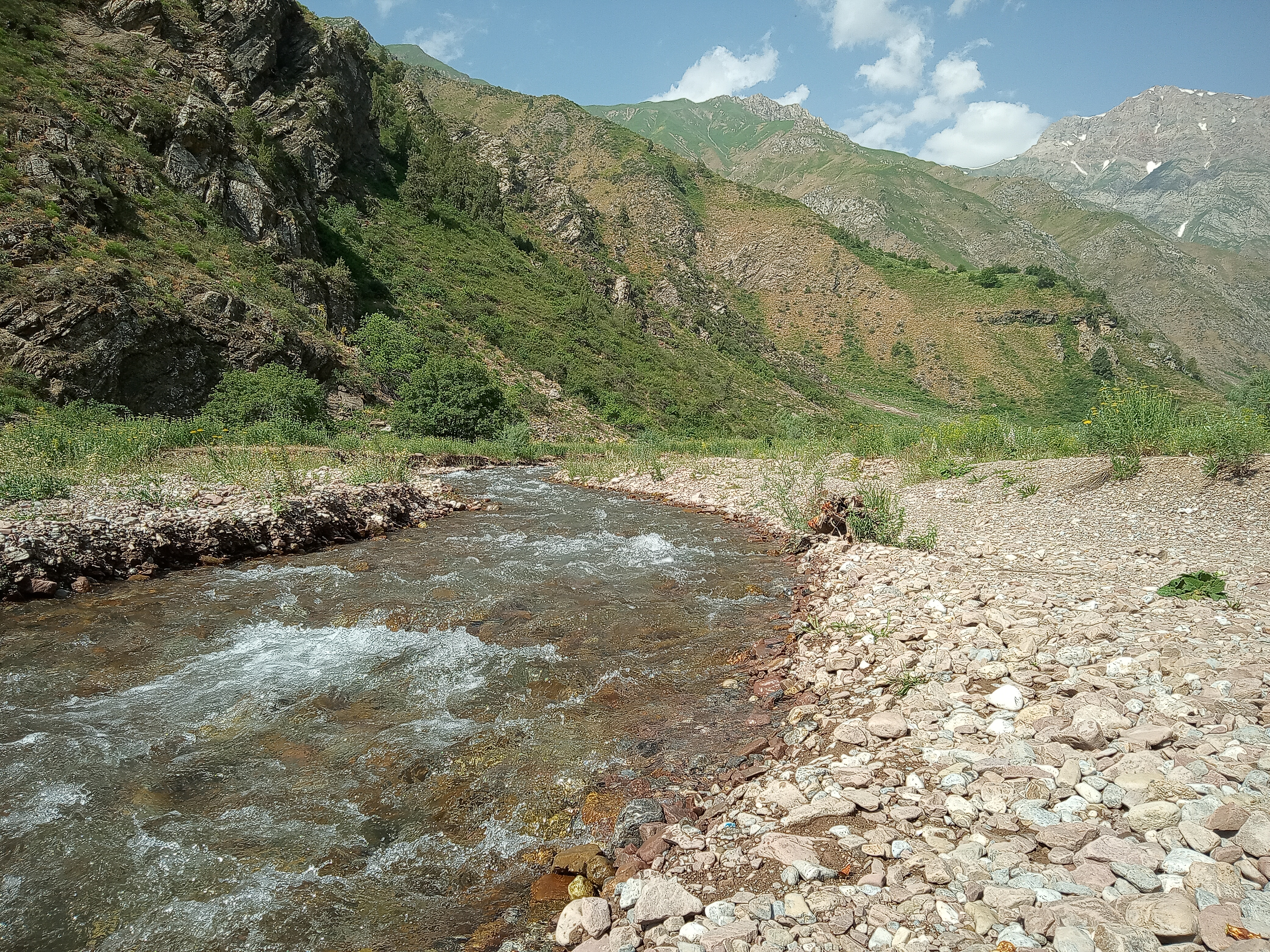
A view of the Ugam Range in northeastern Uzbekistan

The national park is home to more than 1,000 types of plants, including 70 types of trees. Its northern and eastern slopes are forested, whereas its southern slopes are sparsely wooded or open fields. The fauna of the national park includes wild boars, mountain goats, brown bears, wolves, foxes, rabbits, and many types of birds.

The climate of the national park is continental. The average temperature ranges from -14.5° to -32° in winter and from 33.5° to 42° in summer. Annual precipitation is from 400 mm to 900 mm. Three hydroelectric power stations are located within the park, on the banks of rivers and streams.

The national park also contains the Chatkal Biosphere Reserve, which spans 47,945 hectares of mostly mountains terrain. The reserve, which was inscribed by UNESCO in 1978, is home to cave paintings called the Tereksai Petroglyphs, dating to 1,000-2,000 BCE and depicting riders, houses, and dogs.
