= Burchmullo =

- Town
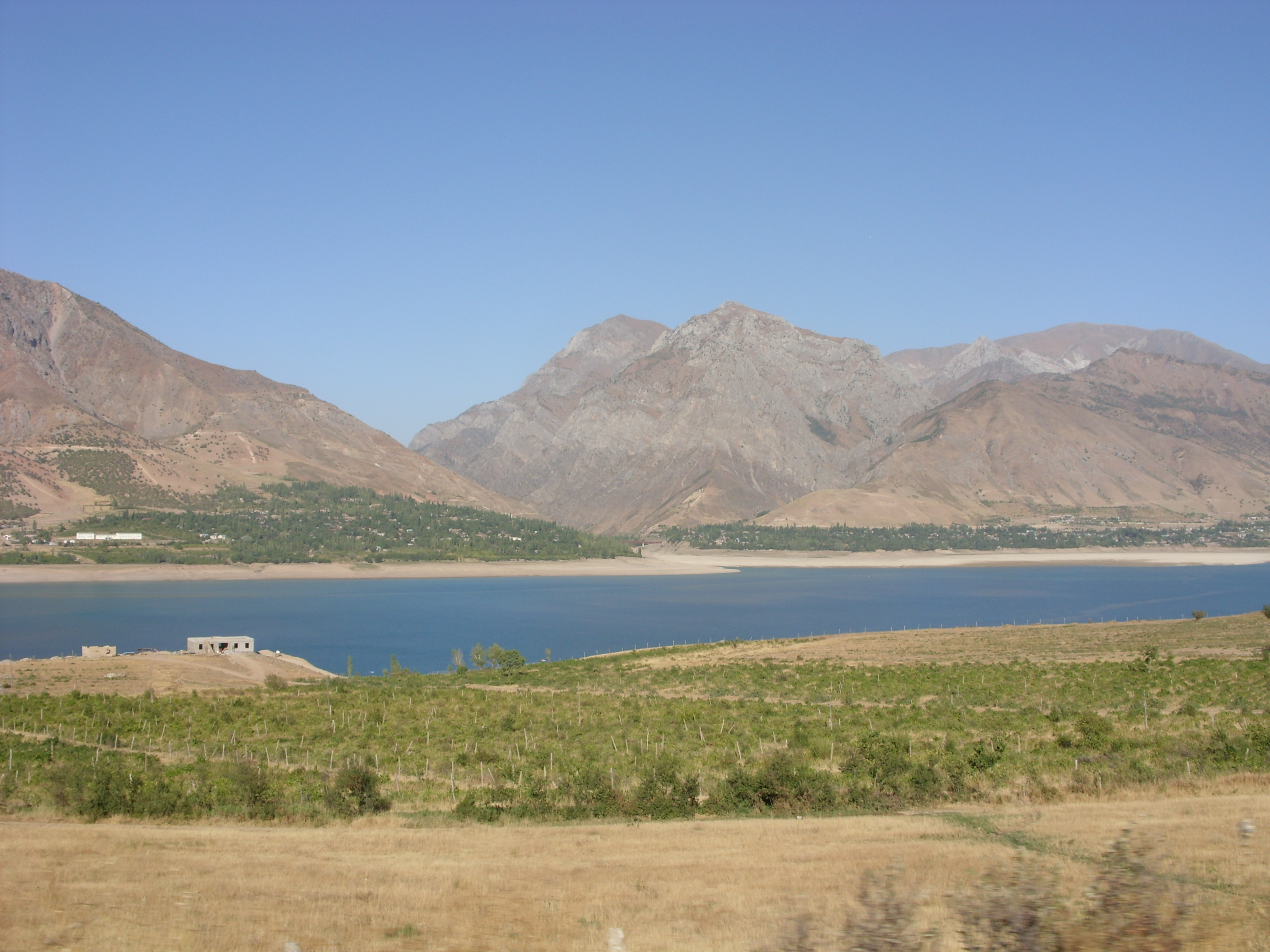

- Location in Uzbekistan
- Coordinates: 41°35′58″N 70°06′05″E
- Country: Uzbekistan
- Region: Tashkent Region
- District: Boʻstonliq District

Population (2016)
  - Total: 4,100
- Time zone: UTC+5 (UZT)

Burchmullo (Uzbek: Burchmullo, Russian: Бурчмулла, romanized: Burchmulla, formerly Brichmulla) is an urban-type settlement in the northeast of Tashkent Region, Uzbekistan. It is part of Boʻstonliq District. Its population is 4,100 (2016). It lies by the Koksu River near its inflow into the Charvak Reservoir by the southwestern extremity of the Koksu Ridge, west Tian Shan. It is about 120 km NEE from Tashkent.

A Neanderthal archaeological site exists near Burchmullo. In mediaeval times, Burchmullo was an important town, fortress and mining location. Polymetallic and other deposits are known in the area, including arsenic, bismuth, lead and silver. In the 18-19th centuries gold was extracted by washing through wool carpets

Burchmullo is also known in Russian culture due to the song Brich-Mulla by Tatyana and Sergey Nikitin.
