= Antibelos =

Antibelos was a Persian nobleman who lived in the second half of the 4th century BC.

He was one of three sons of the prominent Persian Mazaios, who governed several satrapies during the late Achaemenid Empire under the Great Kings Artaxerxes III and Darius III. The ancient historian Ernst Badian suggested that his mother was Babylonian. This conclusion is based on the form of his Semitic name as transmitted in Greek and Latin by the Alexander historians (Antibelos in Arrian and Brochubelus in Curtius Rufus). According to Badian, Brochubelus means “Blessed by Bel.”

Under Darius III, Antibelos held the office of deputy governor of part of Syria, which as a whole was under the authority of his father. After the heavy Persian defeat at the Battle of Gaugamela against Alexander the Great (October 1, 331 BC), he remained loyal to Darius III. When Darius was seized by Bessus and Nabarzanes, Antibelos was among the Persian defectors who informed Alexander, who was in pursuit of the king. Just as Alexander had treated Mazaios kindly after the surrender of Babylon, he is thought to have welcomed Antibelos courteously as well. Nothing further is known about the later life of Antibelos.
