= Boʻstonliq District =

Coordinates: 41.5700°N 69.7700°E

Boʻstonliq
- District
- Boʻstonliq tumani
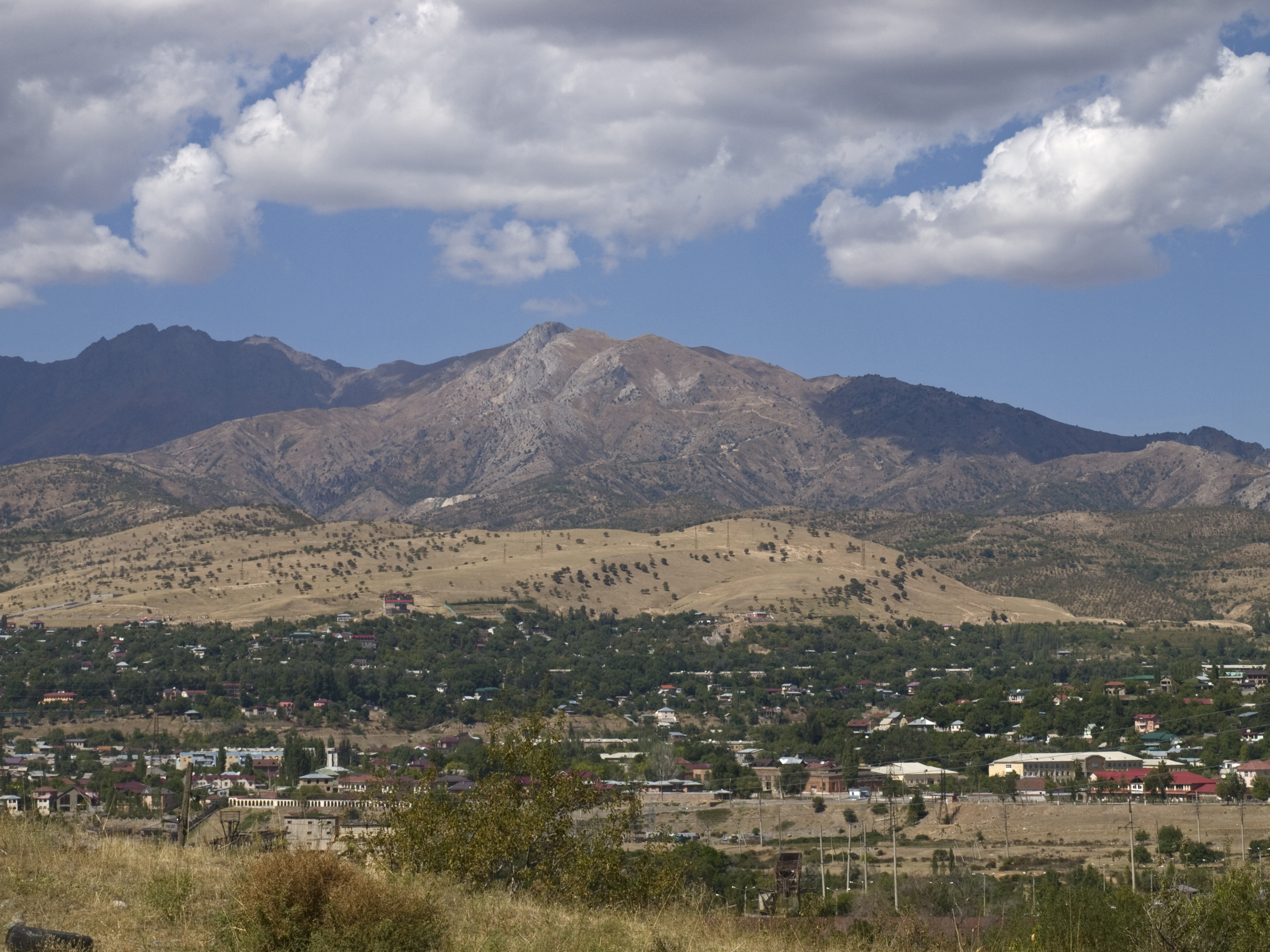
- Panorama of Chorvoq and Ugam Range

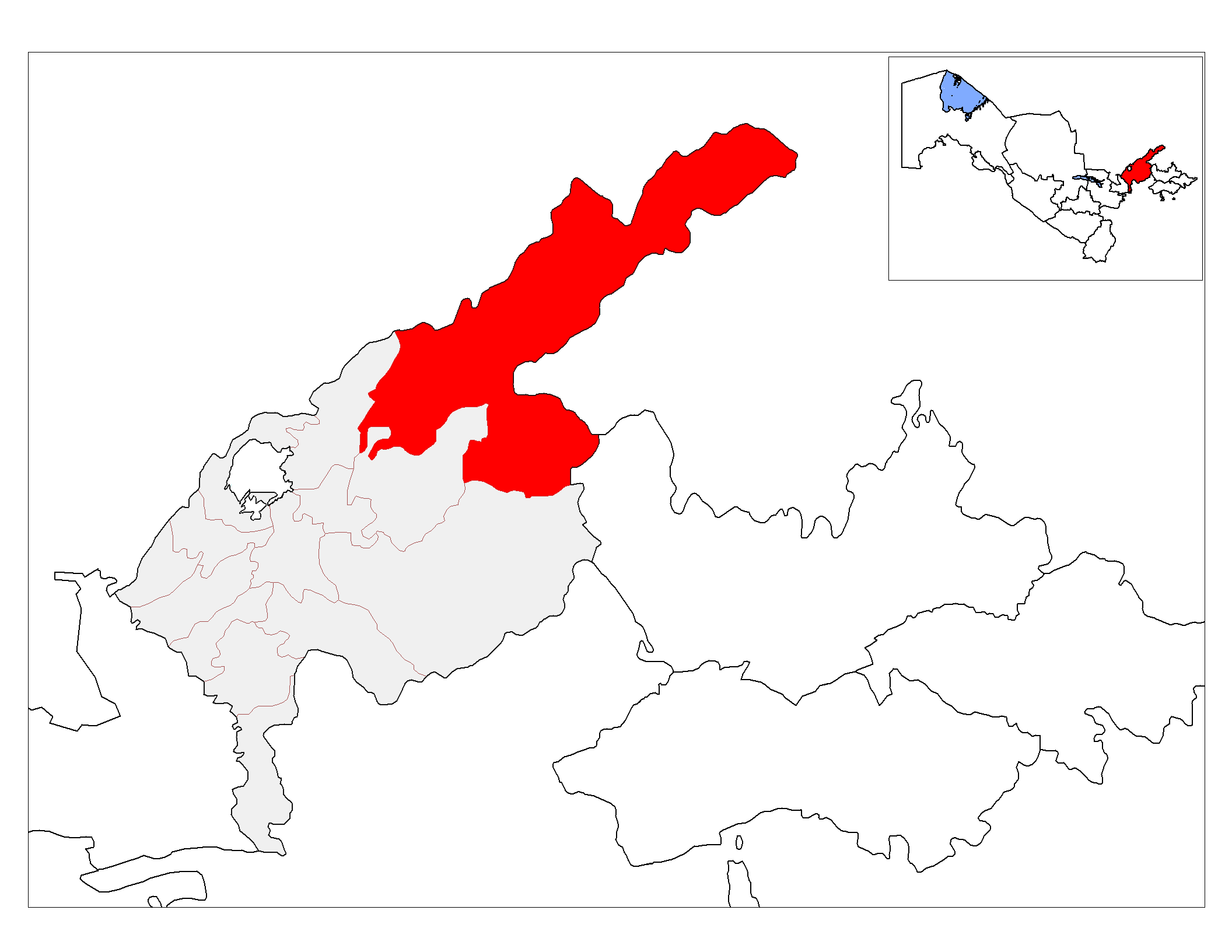
- Country: Uzbekistan
- Region: Tashkent Region
- Capital: Gʻazalkent
- Established: 1955

Area
  - Total: 4,930 km^{2} (1,900 sq mi)

Population (2021)
  - Total: 171,200
  - Density: 34.7/km^{2} (89.9/sq mi)
- Time zone: UTC+5 (UZT)

Boʻstonliq is a district of Tashkent Region in Uzbekistan. The capital lies at the city Gʻazalkent. It has an area of 4,930 km^{2} (1,900 sq mi) and it had 171,200 inhabitants in 2021.

The district consists of one city (Gʻazalkent), 17 urban-type settlements (Iskandar, Chorvoq, Burchmullo, Pargos, Sari qanli, Sobir Raximov, Soyliq, Talpin, Tulabe, Uyenqulsoy, Xumsan, Hoʻja, Xoʻjakent, Chinor, Qoronqul, Qurbonov nomli, Qoʻshqoʻrgʻon) and 18 rural communities (incl. Bogʻiston).

== Geography ==
=== Climate ===
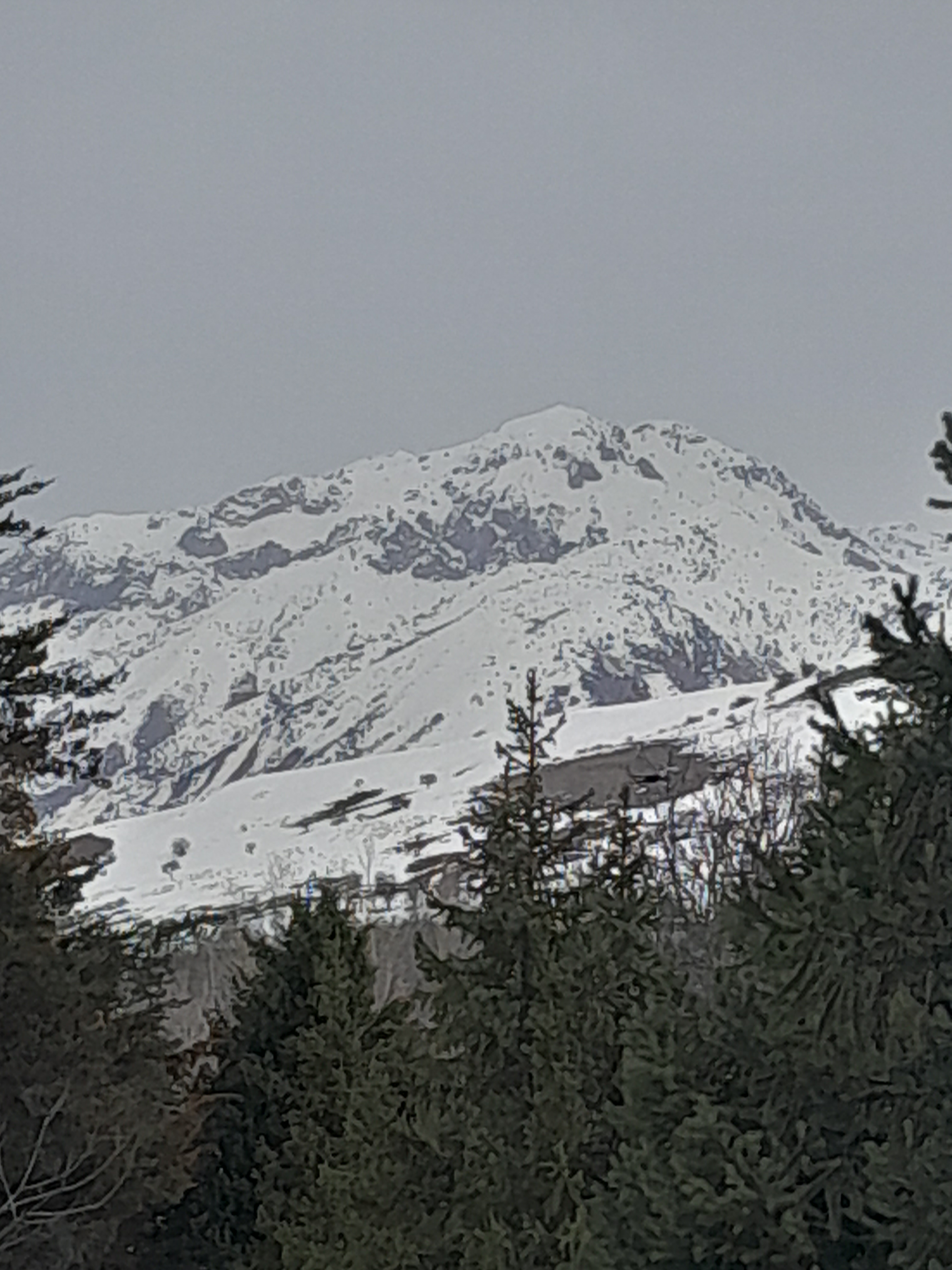
Mountain is located in Bustonliq, Tashkent Region, Uzbekistan

The climate of the region is temperate continental, with hot summers and fairly cold winters. The average annual temperature is +15.0 °C; The average January temperature is −9.0 °C, the average July temperature is +21.0 °C. The absolute minimum temperature was −26 °C, the absolute temperature maximum +46 °C. On average, 500–600 mm of rainfall per year falls on the territory of the district (most of the precipitation falls in spring and autumn). The growing season lasts 210–215 days.

=== Topography ===
The relief of the Bostanliq district is relatively monotonous and is represented mainly by hills, mountains and high mountains. Lowlands are widespread in the western and part of the southern part of the region, adyrs are widespread except in the northern part, where there are only high mountains. Almost all the territory where the high mountain systems, the eastern Tien Shan, the Karzhantau ridge, the Pskem Mountains, the Ugam ridge and the Chatkal ridge are located, is occupied by mountains. The heights in the district accordingly increase in direction from west to east and from south to north. The southern and western parts of the region are on average 1000 meters above sea level. The rest of the region where the highlands prevail, is located at an altitude of 1,200 to 4,000 meters above sea level. The highest point of the area is the peak of the Adelung Pskem ridge with an altitude of 4301 meters. In the second place in height, the mountain is another peak of the Pskem ridge - Beshtor with a height of 4299 meters. In addition to the peaks and peaks listed above, there are many high mountains and peaks in the district, which are between 1,000 and 4,000 meters above sea level. The largest and most significant peaks and peaks of the region: Aktash, Big Chimgan, Kyzylnur, Mingbulak, Pulatkhan and others. Car passes pass through many relatively high mountains. The hills are formed mainly by sandstones and loess. The foot of many mountains are mainly composed of slate and granite. The territory of the region is included in a seismic zone and annually from 5 to 8 or more earthquakes of various types occur in the region.

=== Hydrography ===
Watercourses (sais), some of which turn into rivers, flow down almost from all mountain ranges. The main watercourses in the district are tributaries of the Chirchiq River. The largest of them are the Beldersay, the Pskem, the Ugam, the Koksu, and the Chimgansai. The Chatkal River also flows through the district, though it is sometimes considered to be a fork of the Chirchiq. Most of the district's rivers flow into reservoirs, including the Charvak Reservoir. Their waters are used for irrigated agriculture, practiced on gentle slopes at the foot of the mountains. Groundwater is located in the district at a depth of 2-3 m to 6 to 20 meters.

Charvak hydroelectric power station, located in the Bostanlyk district, is the largest hydroelectric power station of Uzbekistan and one of the largest hydroelectric power stations in Central Asia. The station generates 2000 million kWh annually.
