= Yangiyoʻl =

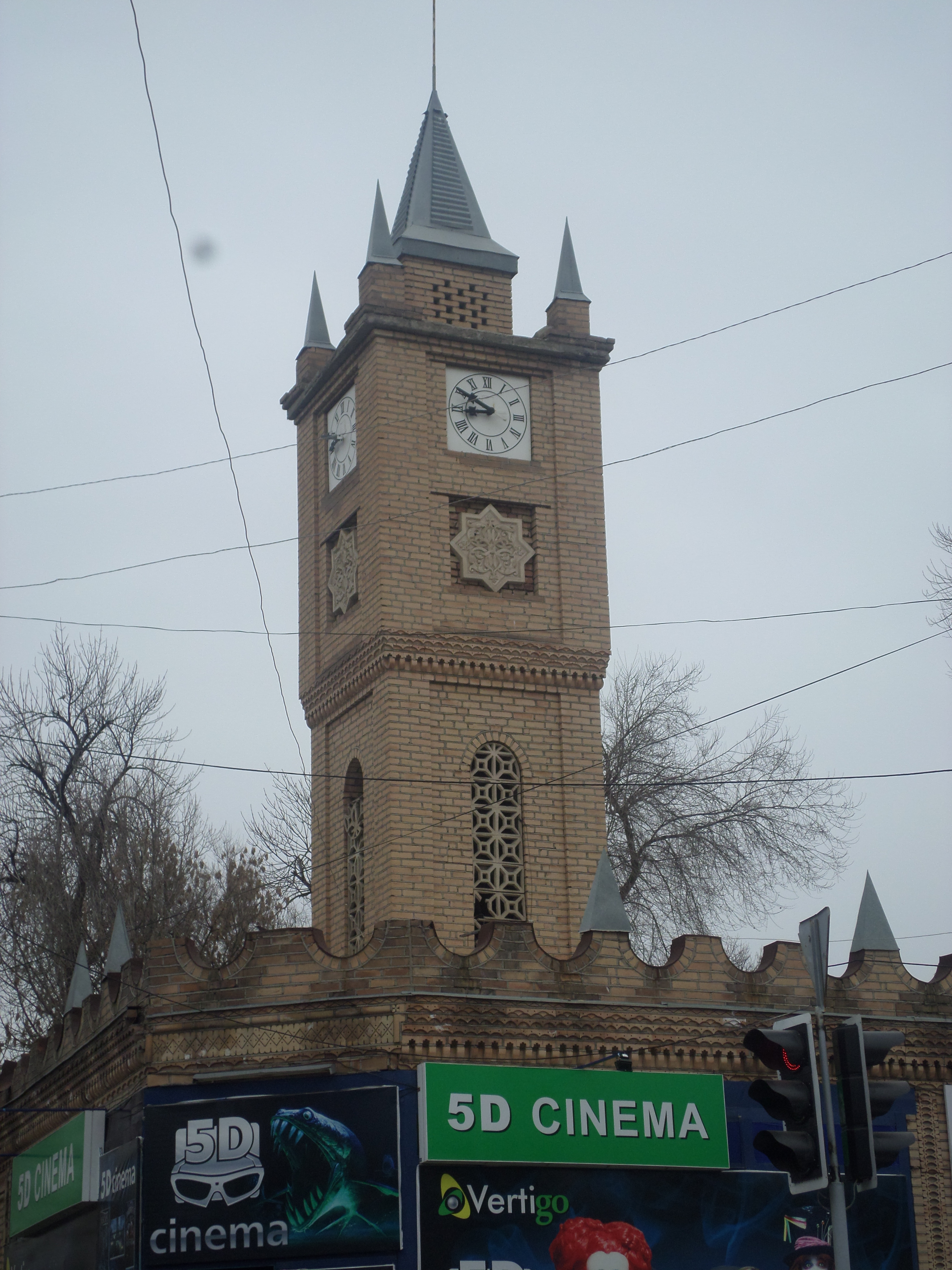
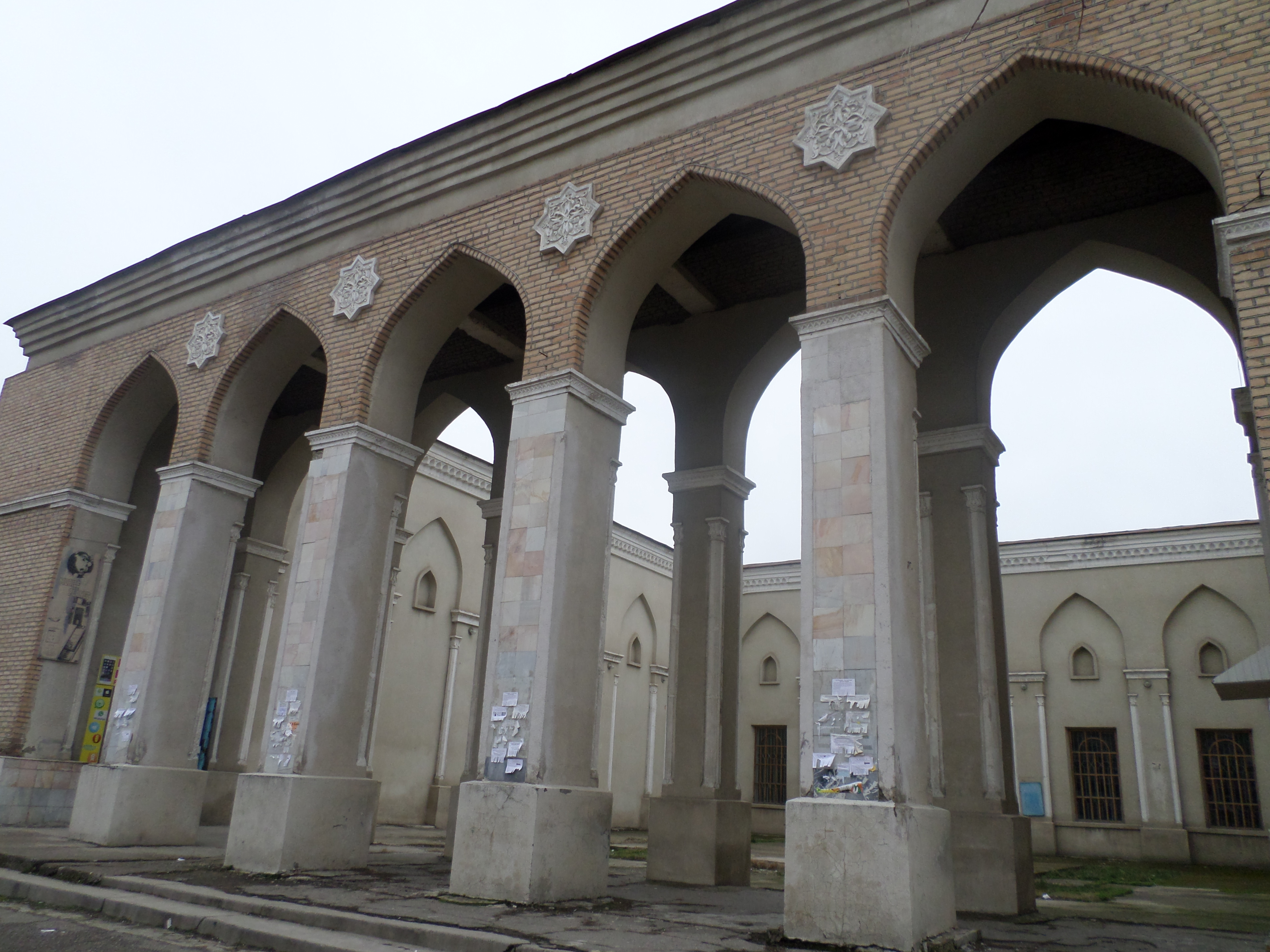
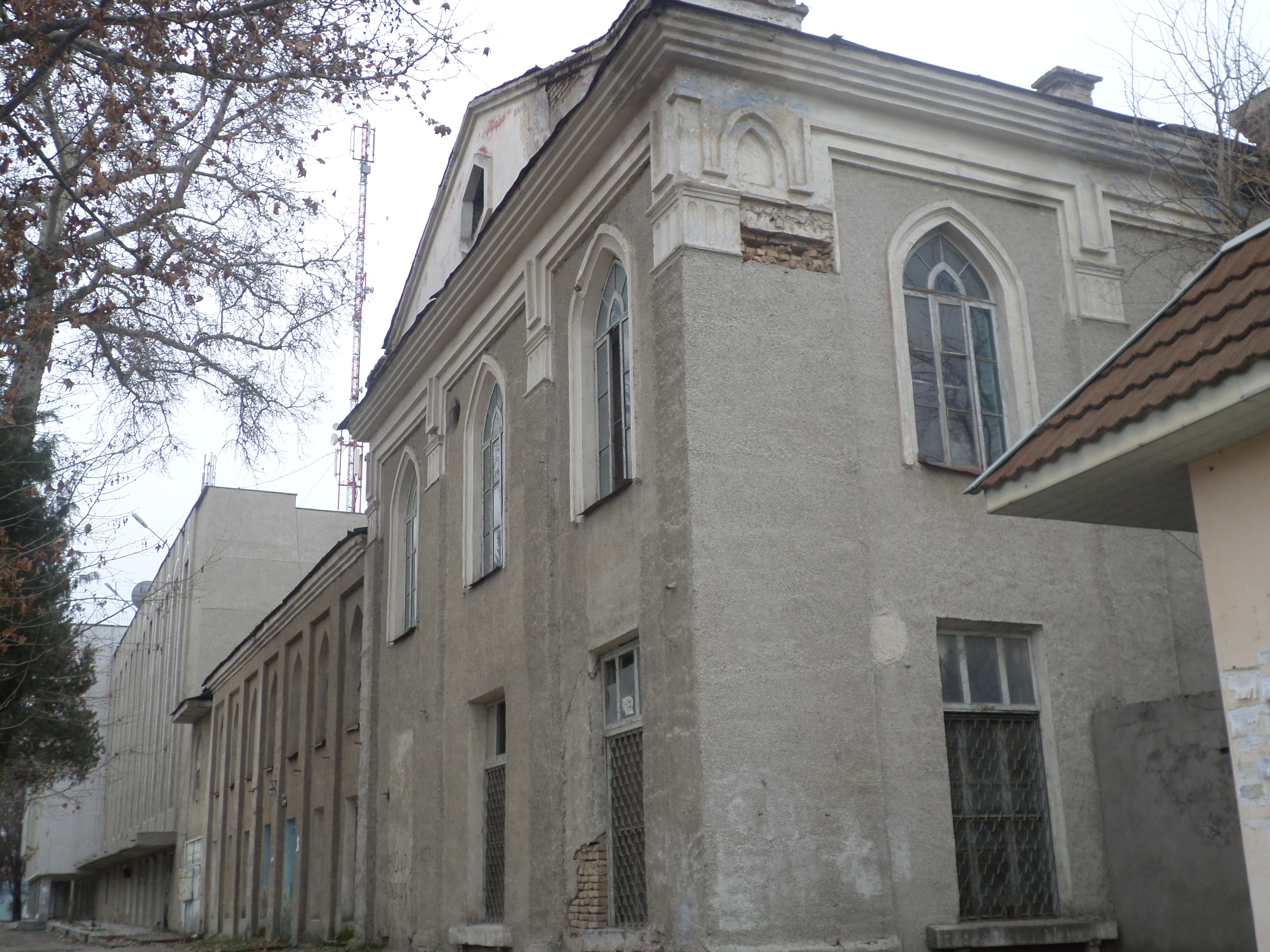
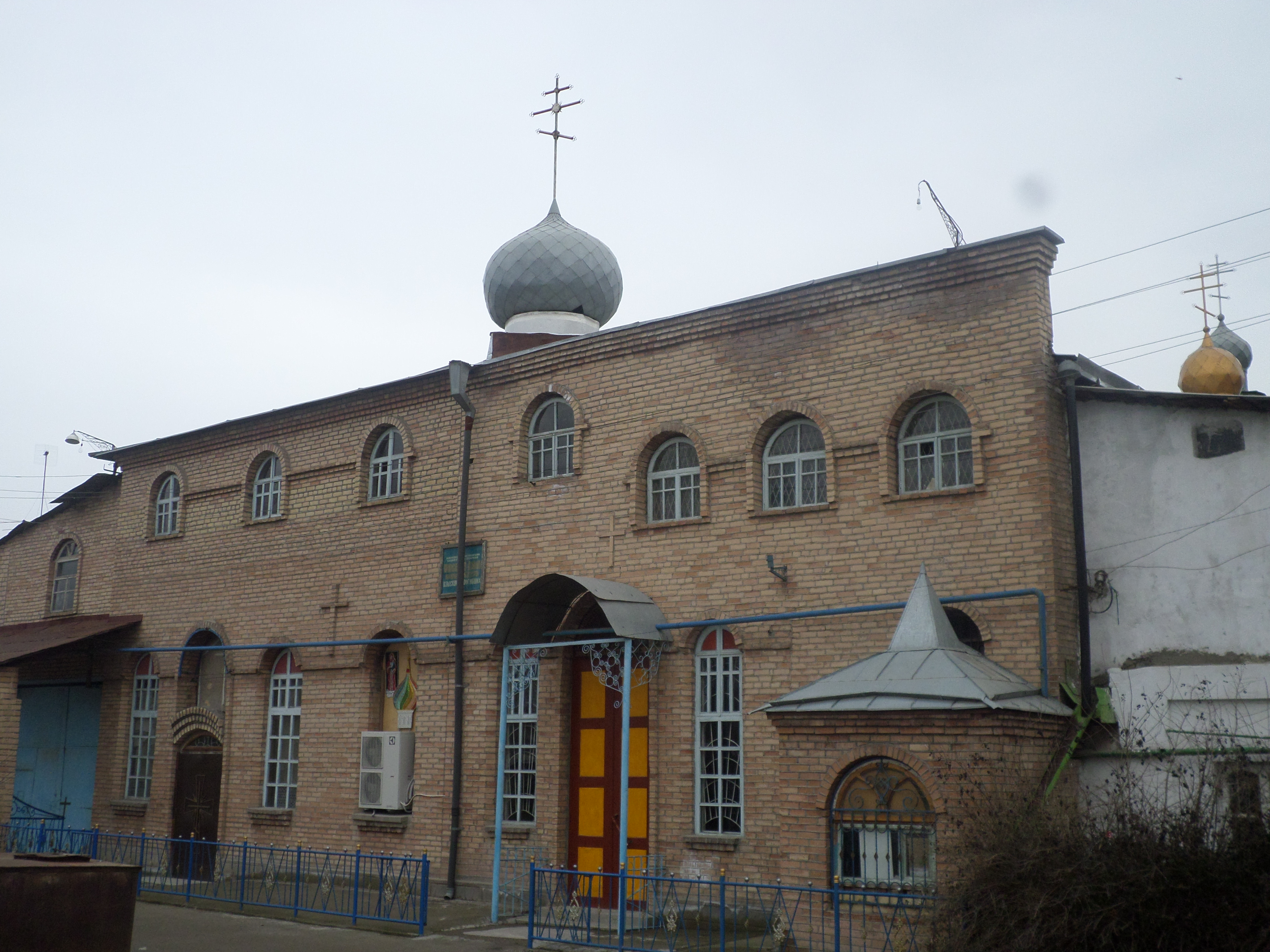
- Kuranty Cinema Factory Church

- Location in Uzbekistan
- Coordinates: 41°06′45″N 69°02′48″E
- Country: Uzbekistan
- Region: Tashkent Region
- Elevation: 350 m (1,150 ft)

Population (2021)
  - Total: 61,700
- Time zone: UTC+5 (UZT)

Yangiyoʻl (Uzbek: Yangiyoʻl / Янгийўл) is a district-level in Uzbekistan's Tashkent Region, 20 km (12 mi) from the city of Tashkent. It has a population of 61,700 people. Industry in the area includes textiles and paper.

The largest factories and plants in the city: Confectionery Factory, Bio-chemical Plant, Oil Plant, Wine plant, Paper Factory, Brick Production Plant, Canned Food Plant. Some of the factories and plants are in great need of investments. There are 18 schools, 3 colleges and 1 academic lyceum in this city. All the other city facilities, such as a park, a cinema, restaurants, bars and cafes are also available for the people living in that area.

== Famous persons ==
- Usman Yusupov - politician

== History ==
Until 1934, it was named after the Qovunchi settlement. It is located on the right bank of the Chirchik River.

During World War II, in 1942, the command of the Polish Anders' Army was based in Yangiyoʻl, before it was evacuated from Uzbekistan to fight against Nazi Germany. There is a Polish military cemetery in the city, where a famous Polish pharmacist, Stefan Stenzel, was buried.
