= Chirchiq (river) =

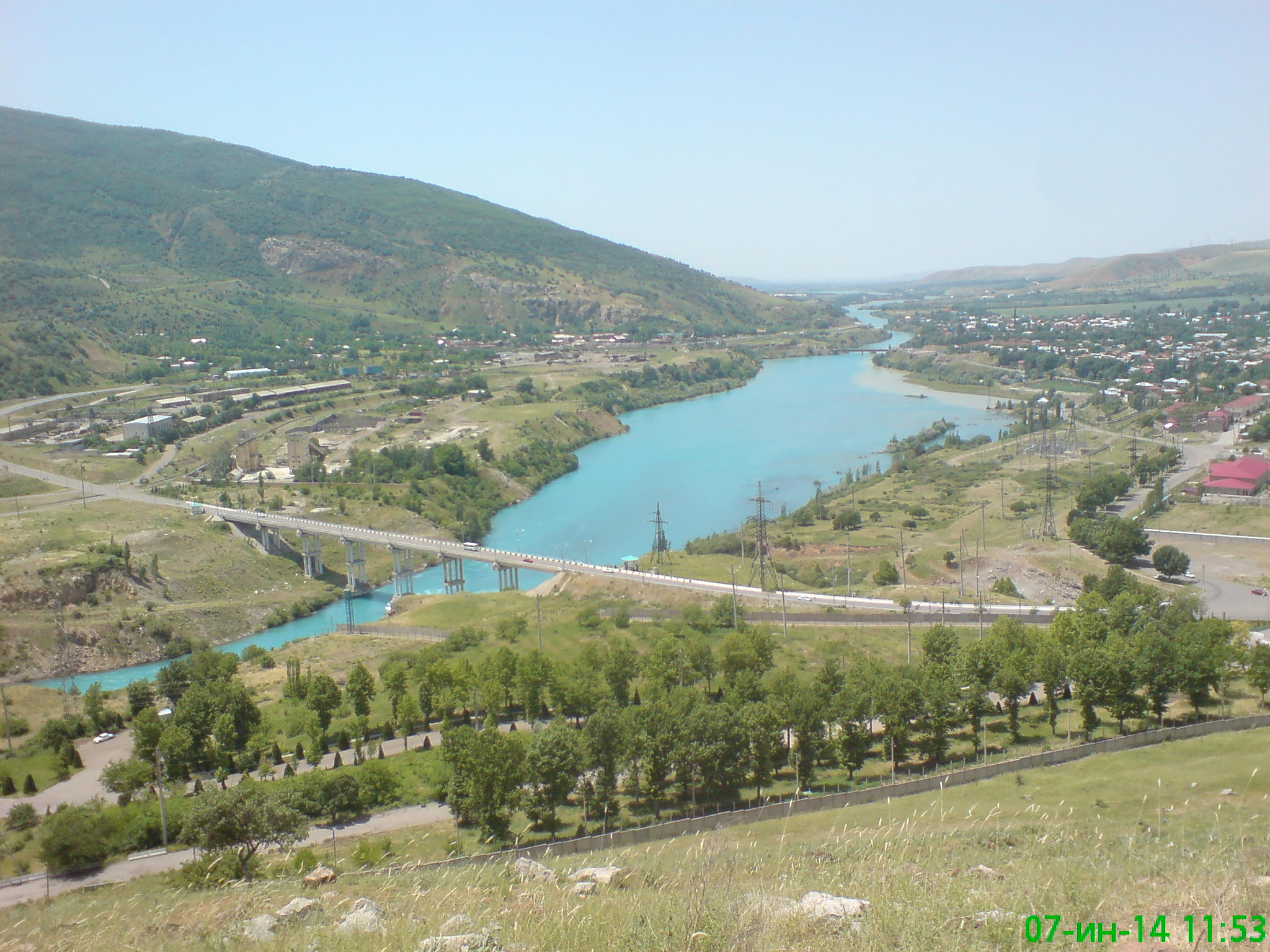
- Chirchiq River near Chorvoq

Location
- Country: Uzbekistan

Physical characteristics
- Mouth: Syr Darya
  - location: Yangi Chonoz, Uzbekistan
  - coordinates: 40.8993°N 68.7076°E
- Length: 155 km (96 mi)
- Basin size: 14,900 km^{2} (5,800 sq mi)
- Discharge
  - average: 220 m^{3}/s (7,800 cu ft/s)

Basin features
- Progression: Syr Darya→ North Aral Sea

The Chirchiq or Chirchik (Uzbek: Chirchiq, Чирчиқ, Russian: Чирчик) is a river of Uzbekistan, a major right tributary of the Syr Darya. It is 155 kilometres (96 mi) in length and its basin has an area of 14,900 square kilometres (5,800 mi^{2}). The principal tributary is the Ugom (right).

The river is formed at the confluence of the rivers Chatkal and Pskem, which form the Lake Charvak reservoir. It flows through about 30 km of canyon in the upper reaches. Below, the valley widens and eventually joins the Syr Darya. There are several dams on the river which serve both for electricity generation and irrigation. All main canals of Tashkent, such as Bozsu, Anhor, Salar, and Burijar are fed by the water from Chirchik. The river flows through or close to the cities Xoʻjakent, Gʻazalkent, Chirchiq, Tashkent, Yangiyoʻl, and Chinoz.

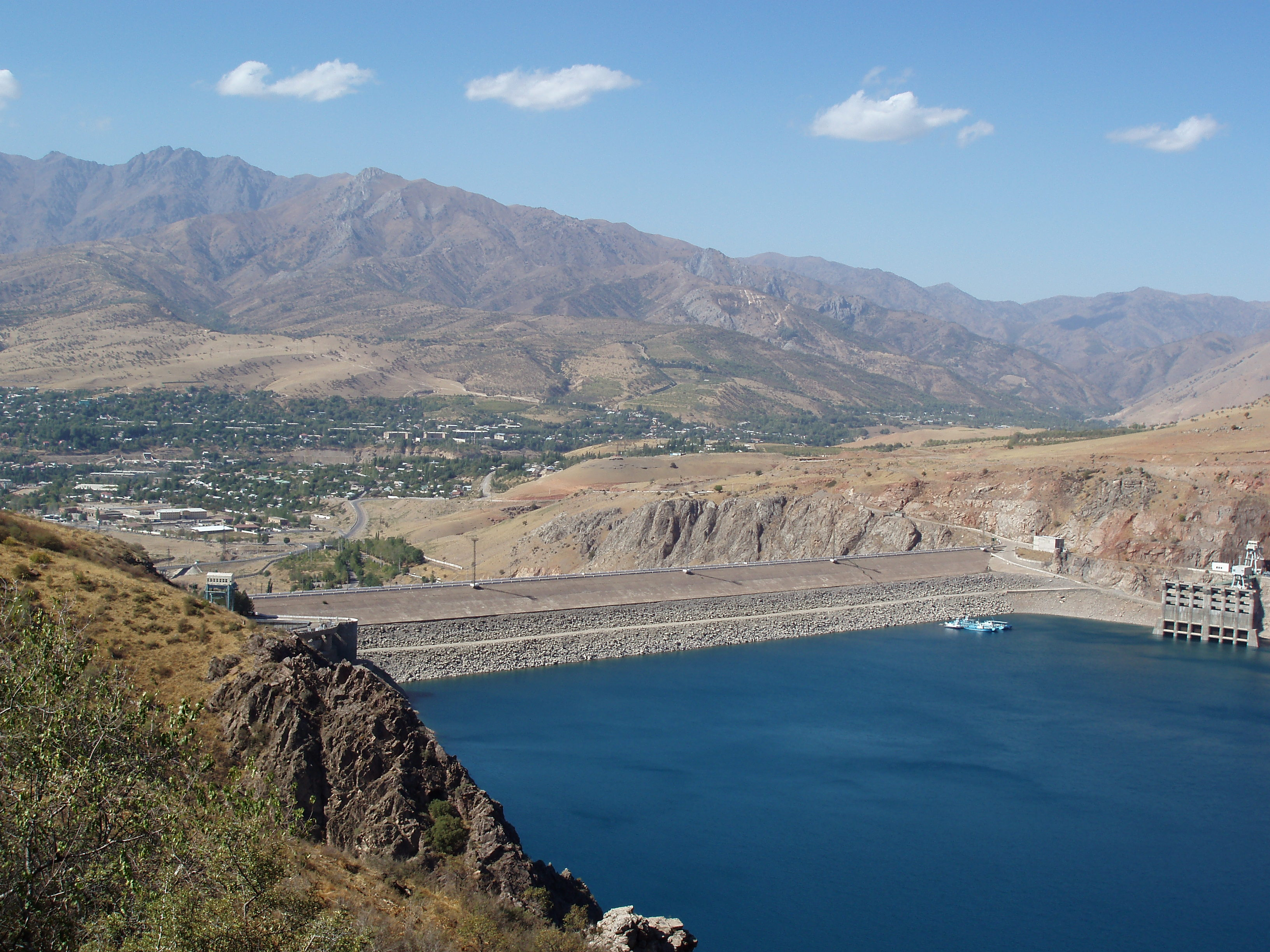
Charvak Dam and reservoir

A number of hydroelectric dams are built along the river.
