= Gʻazalkent =

- City
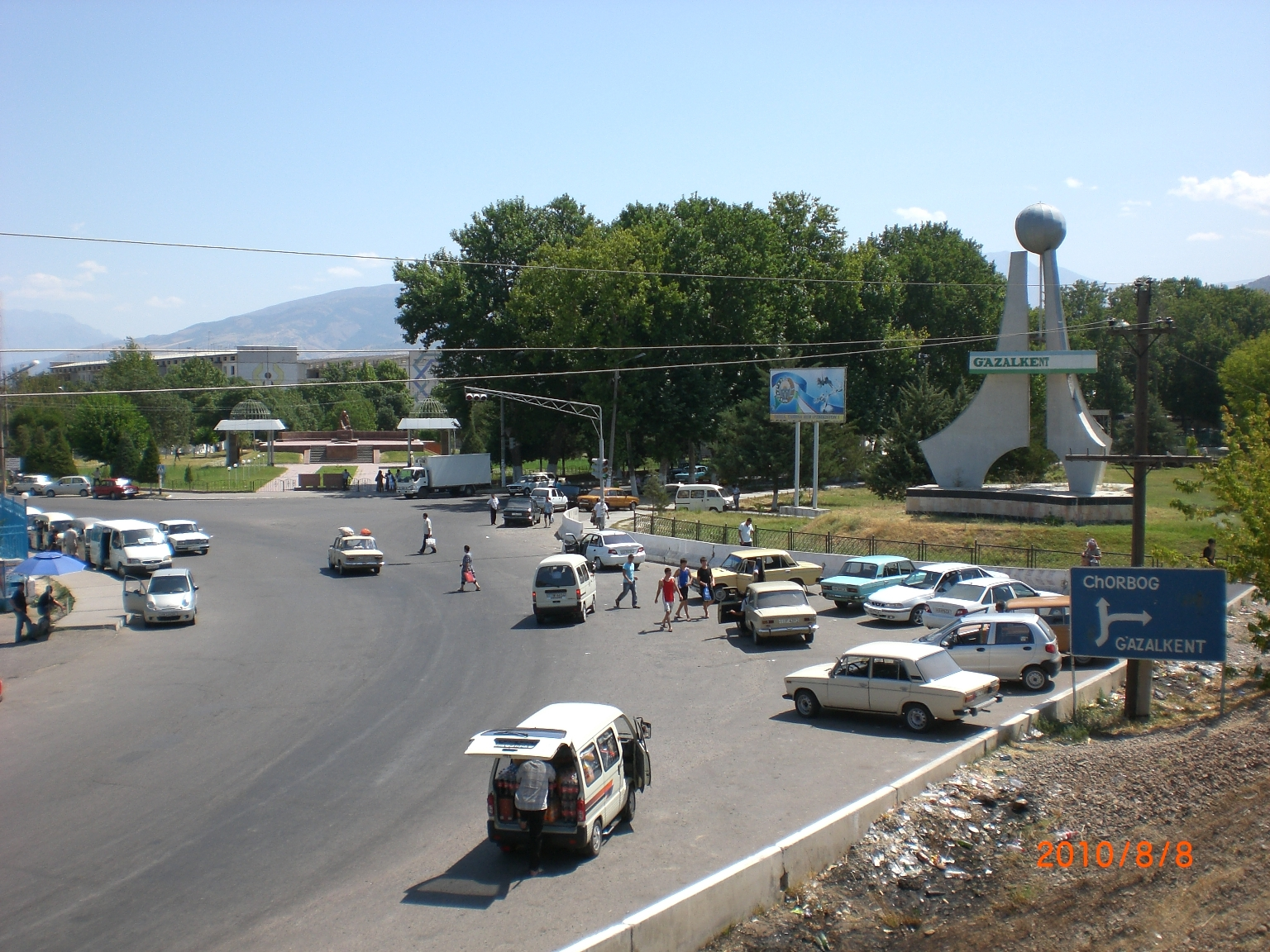

- Location in Uzbekistan
- Coordinates: 41°33′45″N 69°46′30″E
- Country: Uzbekistan
- Region: Tashkent Region
- District: Boʻstonliq District
- Founded: 1932
- City status: 1964
- Elevation: 713 m (2,339 ft)

Population (2016)
  - Total: 21,600
- Time zone: UTC+5 (UZT)

Gʻazalkent (Uzbek: Gʻazalkent/Ғазалкент) is a city in Tashkent Region, Uzbekistan. It is the administrative center of Boʻstonliq District. Its population is 21,600 (2016).
