= Chirchiq =

Chirchiq Chirchiq / Чирчиқ
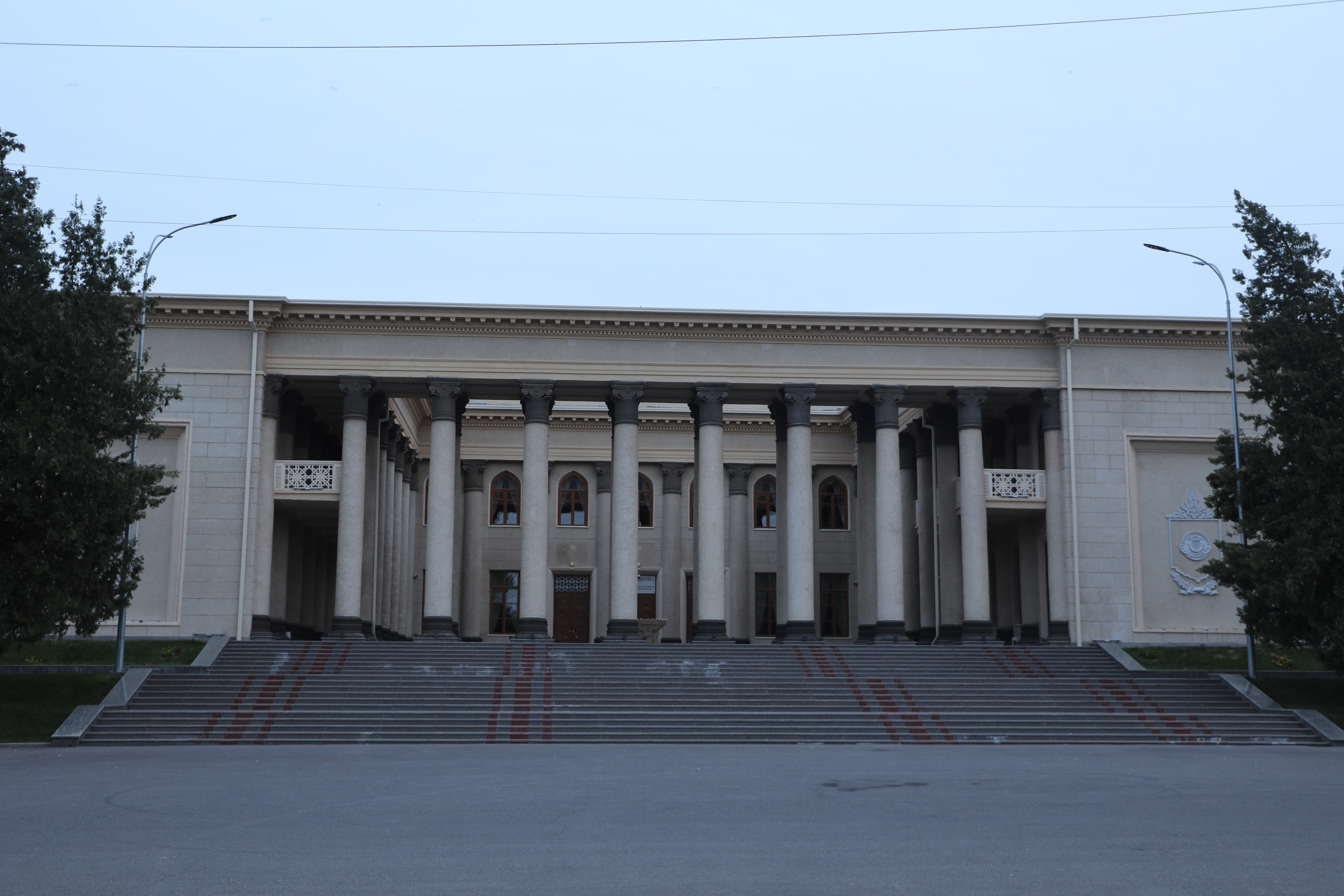
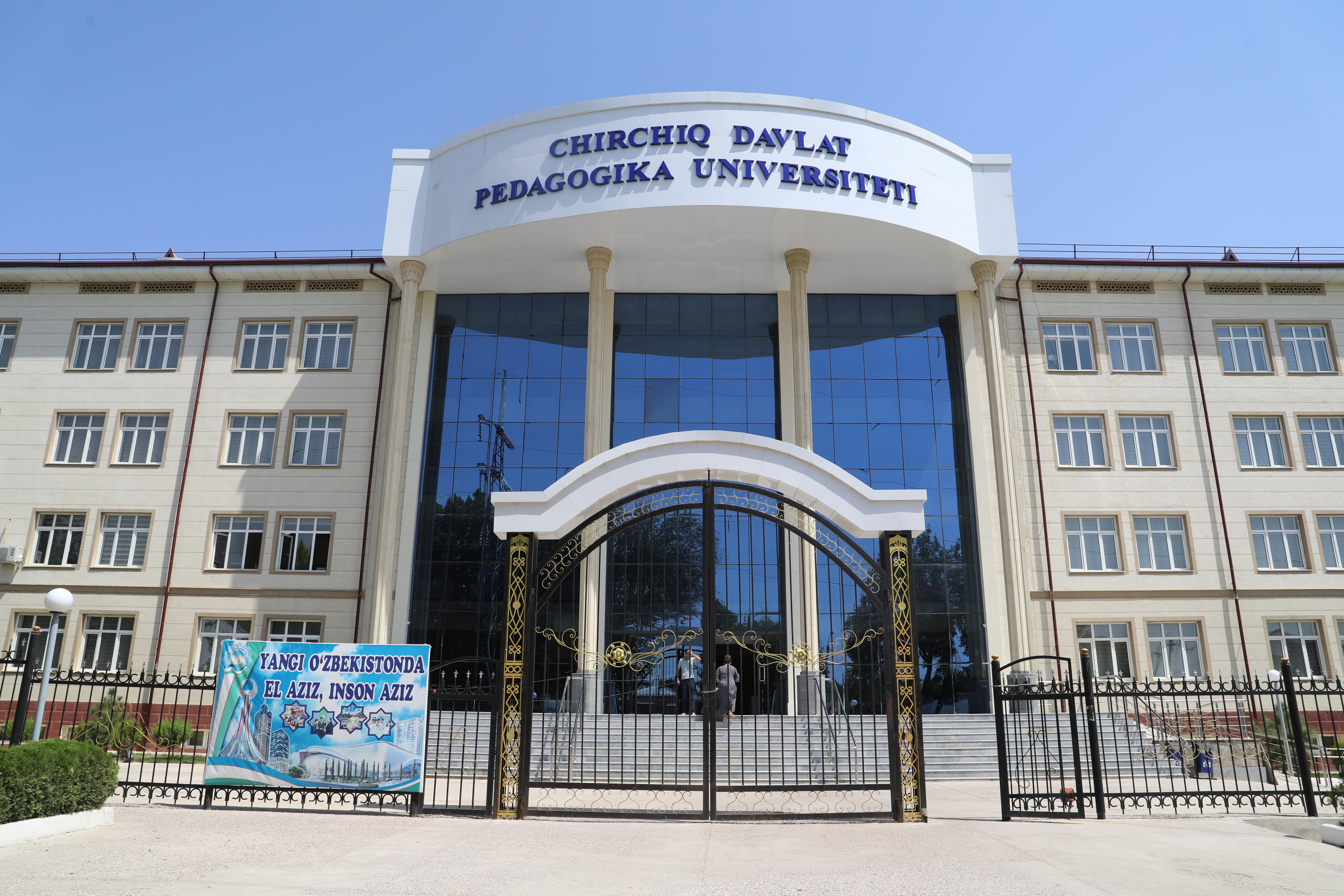
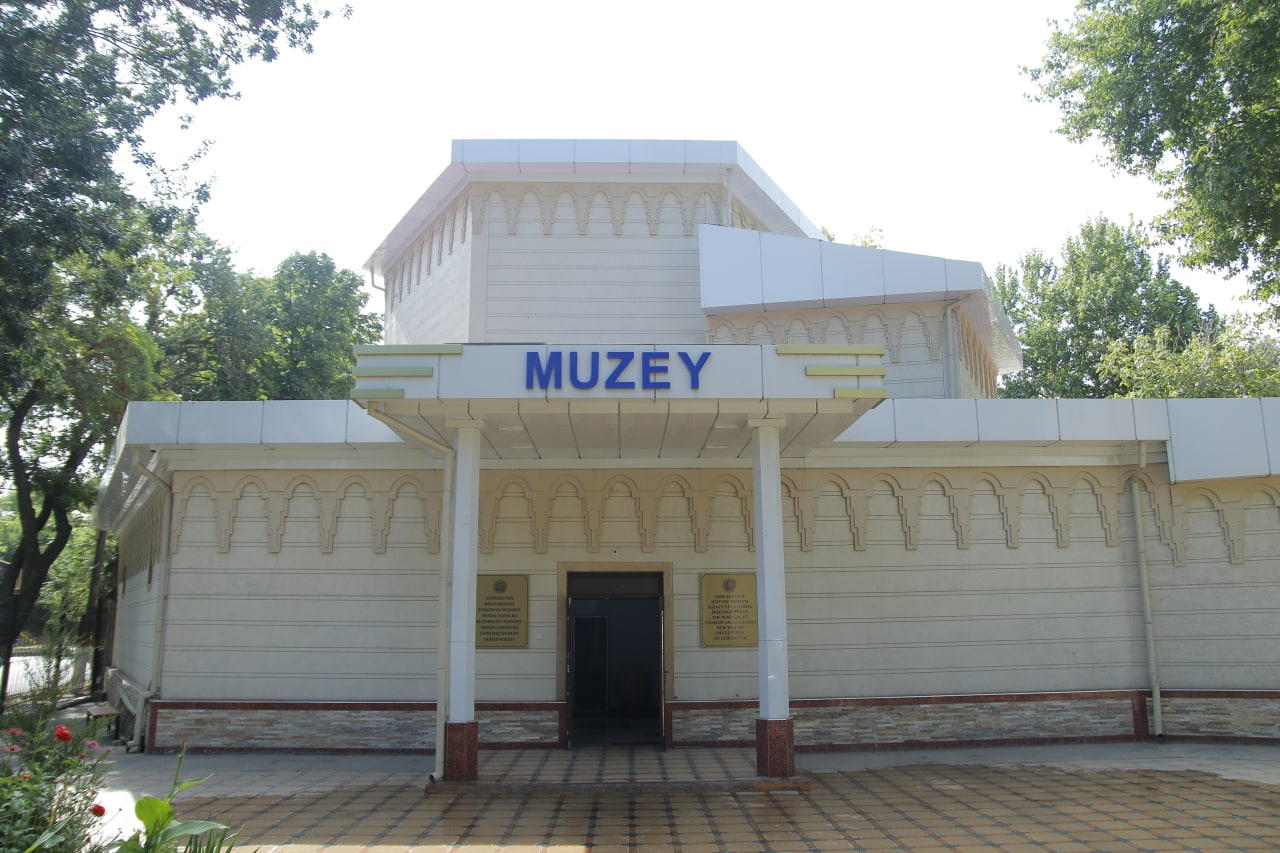
- Chemists' Palace of Culture Pedagogical University Historical Museum

- Location in Uzbekistan
- Coordinates: 41°28′8″N 69°34′56″E
- Country: Uzbekistan
- Region: Tashkent Region

Population (2021)
  - Total: 162,800

Chirchiq (Uzbek: Chirchiq / Чирчиқ) is a district-level city in Tashkent Region, in eastern Uzbekistan. It is about 32 km northeast of Tashkent, along the river Chirchiq. Chirchiq lies in the Chatkal Mountains. The population of Chirchiq as of 2021 is approximately 162,800.

It is located at latitude 41° 28' 8N; longitude 69° 34' 56E, 582 meters above sea level.

== History ==
The city was founded in 1935, when several local villages grew together as a consequence of the construction of a hydroelectric power station on the Chirchiq River.

== Economy ==
Chirchiq is in the middle of an intensively cultivated area, producing mainly vegetables and fruits, including melons and grapes. A large electrochemical work produces fertilizer for the region's collective farms. Chirchiq's industries also include the production of ferroalloys and machinery for the agricultural and chemical industries.

Chirchiq is also a major winter recreation area in Tashkent Region. There are two major ski resorts near the city, named Chimgan and Amirsoy, that attract tourists from throughout Central Asia and Russia. A water diversion on the Chirchiq River just outside the city provides the major source of drinking water for Tashkent and other cities to the south.

== Surroundings ==
There are many villages near Chirchiq, for example: Azadbash, Abay, Kyzyltu, Koshkargan, Yumalak, Tavaksay.
