= Tashkent Region =

Region of Uzbekistan

Tashkent Region Toshkent viloyati Тошкент вилояти
- Region
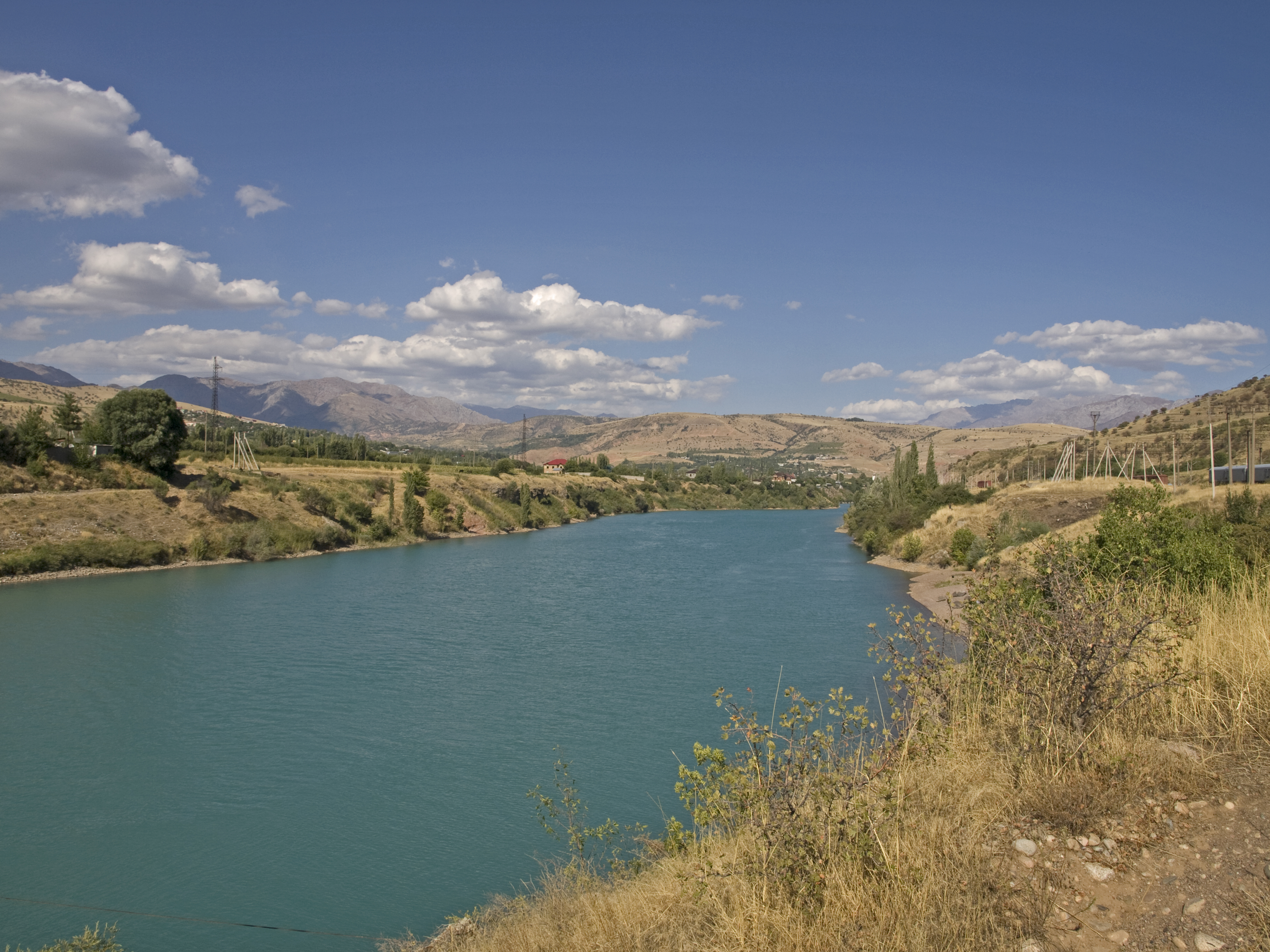
- The Chirchiq River in Khodzhikent

- Map of Uzbekistan, location of Tashkent Region highlighted
- Coordinates: 41°10′N 69°45′E
- Country: Uzbekistan
- Established: January 15, 1938
- Administrative centre: Nurafshon

Government
  - Hokim: Zoir Mirzayev

Area
  - Total: 15,250 km^{2} (5,890 sq mi)

Population (2021)
  - Total: 2,975,900
  - Density: 195.1/km^{2} (505.4/sq mi)
- Time zone: UTC+5 (East)
  - Summer (DST): UTC+5 (not observed)
- ISO 3166 code: UZ-TO
- Districts: 15
- Cities: 16
- Towns: 95
- Villages: 869

Tashkent Region (Uzbek: Toshkent viloyati, Тошкент вилояти) is a viloyat (region) of Uzbekistan, located in the northeastern part of the country, between the Syr Darya River and the Tian Shan Mountains. It borders Kyrgyzstan, Tajikistan, Sirdaryo Region and Namangan Region, as well as the city of Tashkent which is a region in its own right, forming an enclave entirely encircled by the territory of Tashkent Region. It covers an area of 15,250 km². The population is estimated 2,975,900 (2021). Its capital is the city of Nurafshon. Other cities are Angren, Olmaliq, Ohangaron, Bekabad, Chirchiq, Gʻazalkent, Keles, Parkent, Yangiobod, and Yangiyoʻl.

== Districts ==
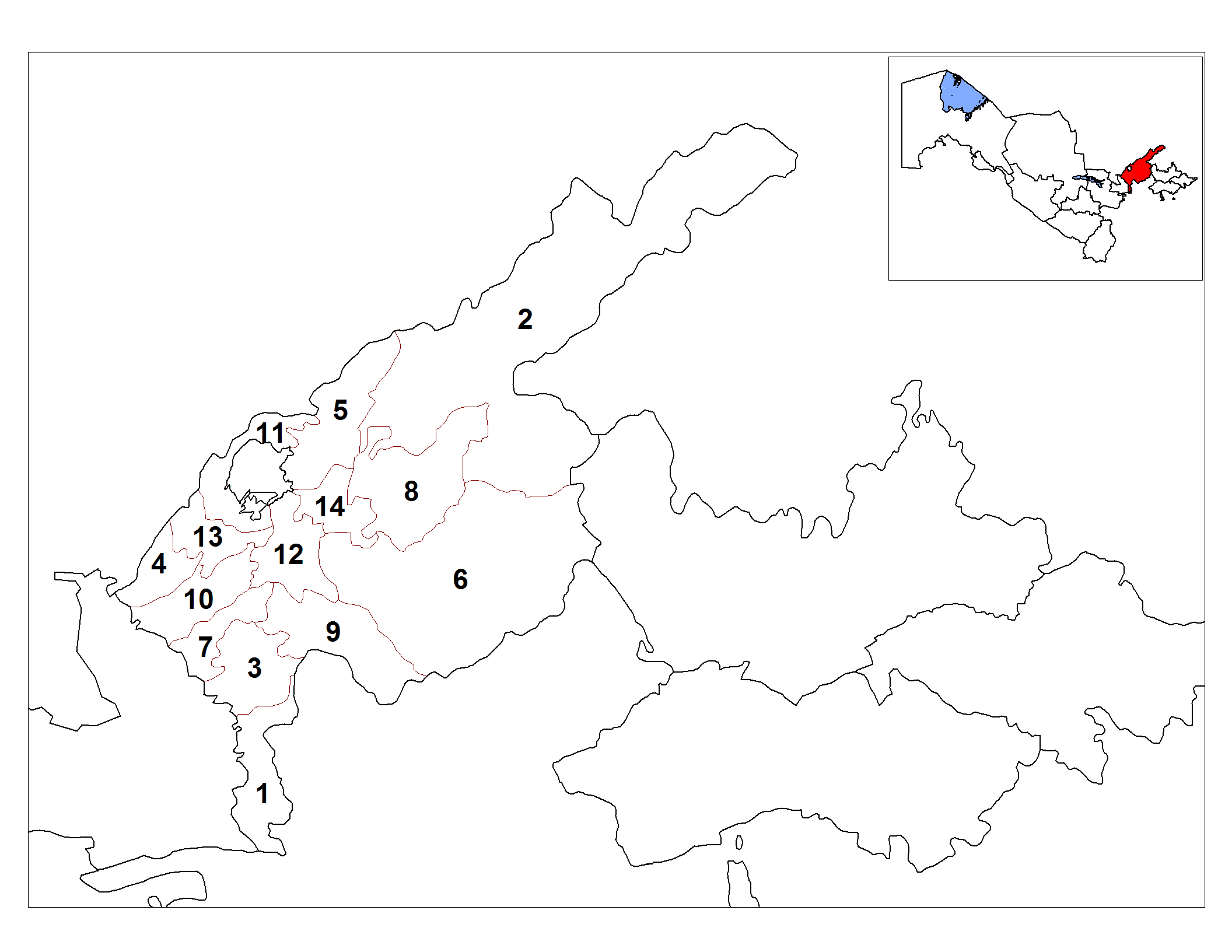
Districts of Tashkent Region

The Tashkent Region consists of 15 districts (listed below) and seven district-level cities: Nurafshon, Olmaliq, Angren, Bekabad, Ohangaron, Chirchiq and Yangiyoʻl.

	District name	District capital
1	Bekabad District	Zafar
2	Boʻstonliq District	Gʻazalkent
3	Boʻka District	Boʻka
4	Chinoz District	Chinoz
5	Qibray District	Qibray
6	Ohangaron District	Ohangaron
7	Oqqoʻrgʻon District	Oqqoʻrgʻon
8	Parkent District	Parkent
9	Piskent District	Piskent
10	Quyichirchiq District	Doʻstobod
11	Zangiota District	Eshonguzar
12	Oʻrtachirchiq District	Nurafshon
13	Yangiyoʻl District	Yangiyoʻl
14	Yuqorichirchiq District	Yangibozor
15	Tashkent District	Keles

There are 16 cities (Nurafshon, Olmaliq, Angren, Bekabad, Ohangaron, Chirchiq, Yangiyoʻl, Oqqoʻrgʻon, Gʻazalkent, Boʻka, Parkent, Piskent, Chinoz, Keles, Doʻstobod, Yangiobod) and 95 urban-type settlements in the Tashkent Region.

== Climate ==
The climate is a typically continental climate with mild wet winters and hot dry summers.

Chatkal National Park, with mountains and forests, is located within Tashkent Region.

== Economy ==
Natural resources include copper, brown coal, molybdenum, zinc, gold, silver, rare earths, natural gas, petroleum, sulfur, table salt, limestone, and granite.

Tashkent Region is the most economically developed in the country. Industry includes energy production, mining, metallurgy, fertilizers, chemicals, electronics, textiles, cotton purification, food processing and footwear.

Tashkent Region also has a highly developed agricultural industry, based primarily on irrigation to which the Tuyabuguz Reservoir is a major contributor. The main crops are cotton and hemp, but cereals, melons and gourds, fruit and vegetables and citrus fruits are increasing. Livestock is also important.

The region has a well-developed transportation infrastructure, with over 360 km of railways and 3771 km of surfaced roads. Tashkent has a large international airport, which is the main air gateway to the country.
