= Tourism in Uzbekistan =

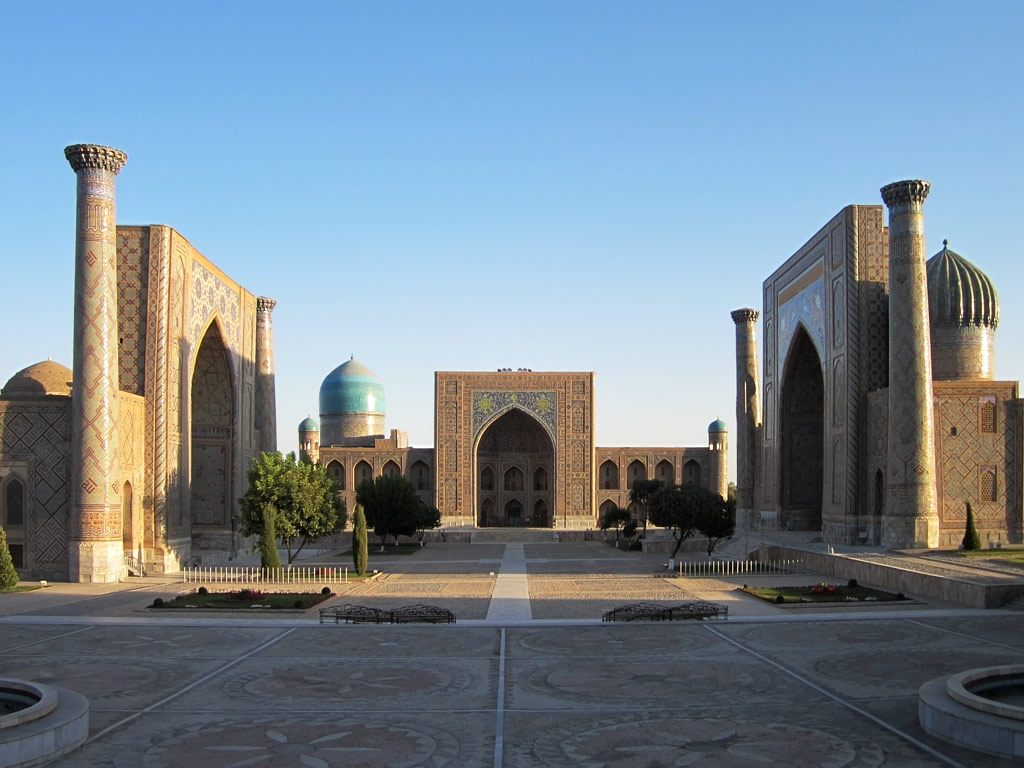
Registan Complex, Samarkand

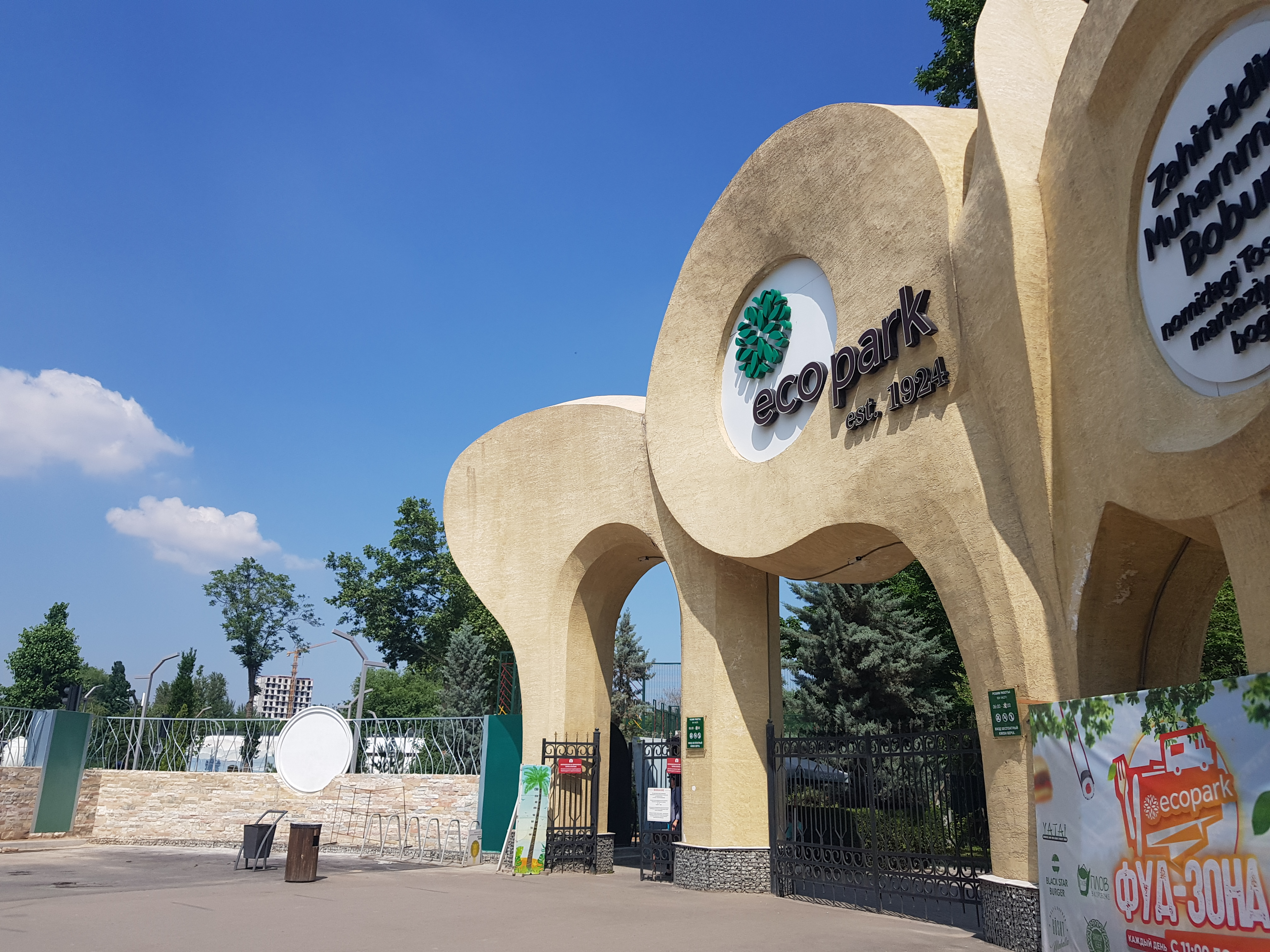
The Central Ecopark

Tourism represents a substantial and fast-growing sector of the economy of Uzbekistan. The government of Uzbekistan under President Shavkat Mirziyoyev has invested heavily in developing tourism as a high-growth potential industry, resulting in an increase in international arrivals from approximately 1 million in 2016 to 7 million in 2023. In 2024, foreign tourist arrivals increased by 20% to 8 million people.

Uzbekistan's most-visited tourist sites are associated with the history of the Silk Road, particularly the cities of Bukhara, Khiva, and Samarkand. The Registan ensemble in Samarkand, a complex of three madrasahs dating from the 15-17th centuries situated around the city's historic central square, is one of Uzbekistan's most-visited landmarks, attracting more than 1 million visitors in 2022. Uzbekistan is home to seven UNESCO World Heritage Sites, including the historical centres of Bukhara, Samarkand, and Shakhrisabz, the birthplace of Amir Timur; as well as the Ichan Qala (lit. "inner fortress"), the walled centre of Khiva. While most visitors cited interest in Uzbekistan's historical-architectural sites and culture, the government of Uzbekistan and tourism organizations are also working to develop other tourism areas, such as ecotourism and pilgrimage tourism.

The government of Uzbekistan continues to invest in both developing tourism-related infrastructure, and marketing Uzbekistan as a tourism destination. The Samarkand International Airport was completely reconstructed in 2022 to triple its capacity, and renovations of the Tashkent International Airport are ongoing as of 2024. Uzbekistan's Ministry of Culture and Tourism has partnered with international media, streaming services, and social media influencers to promote the country's tourism potential.

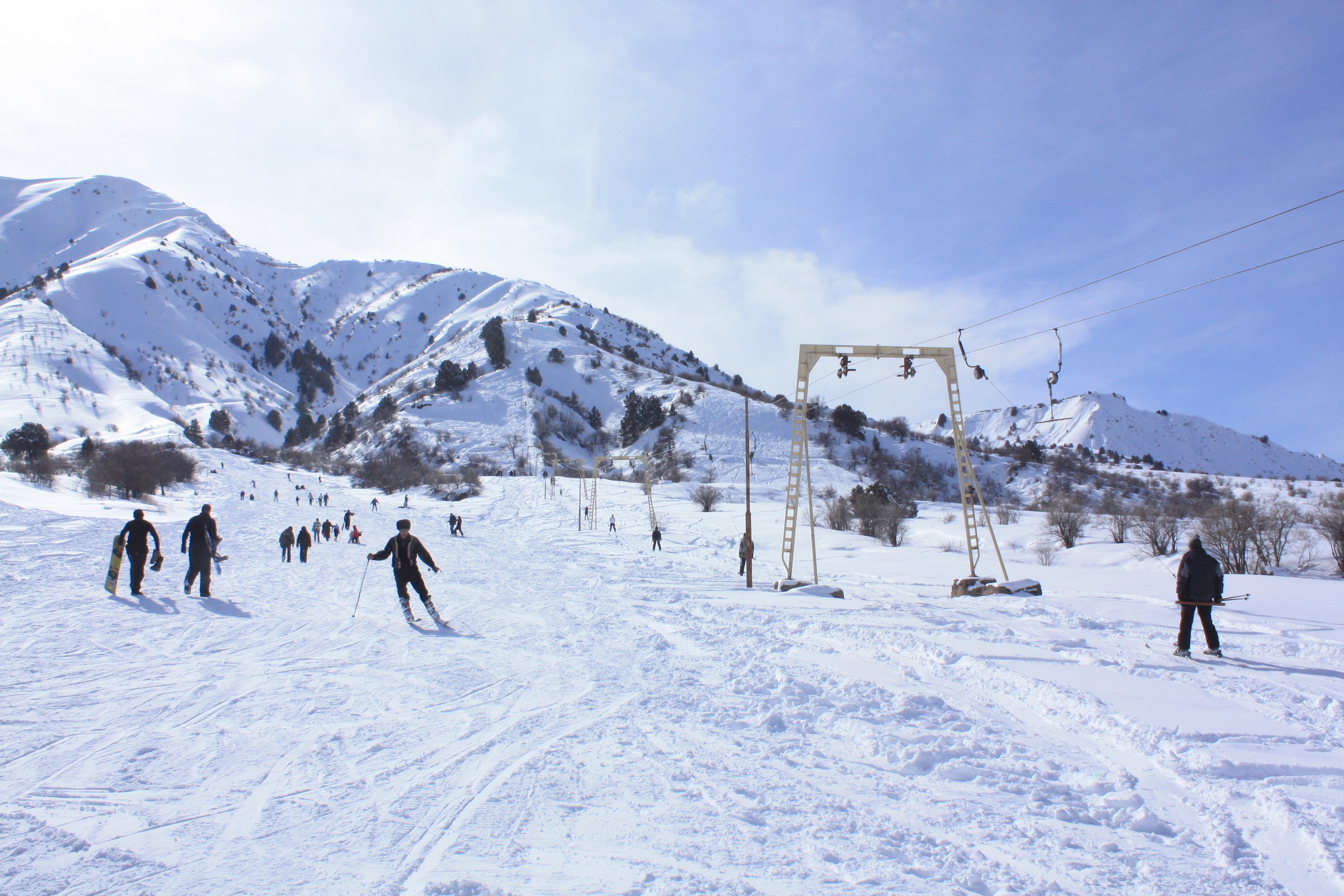
Chimgan Ski

== Mountaineering, hiking and rock-climbing ==
The southeast portion of the country contains the western ends of the Tien Shan mountains, which attract active forms of tourism such as mountaineering and rock climbing. Most well known for its ease of access from Tashkent is the Greater Chimgan Peak (3,309 m) of the Chatkal Range. This place serves as a starting point for many routes of hiking, climbing, horse riding, mountain skiing, and hang-gliding. Uzbekistan has multiple ski and mountain resorts, including Chimgan, which was constructed during the Soviet era, and Amirsoy, which opened in 2019. Both resorts are open for visitors to enjoy during seasons other than winter.

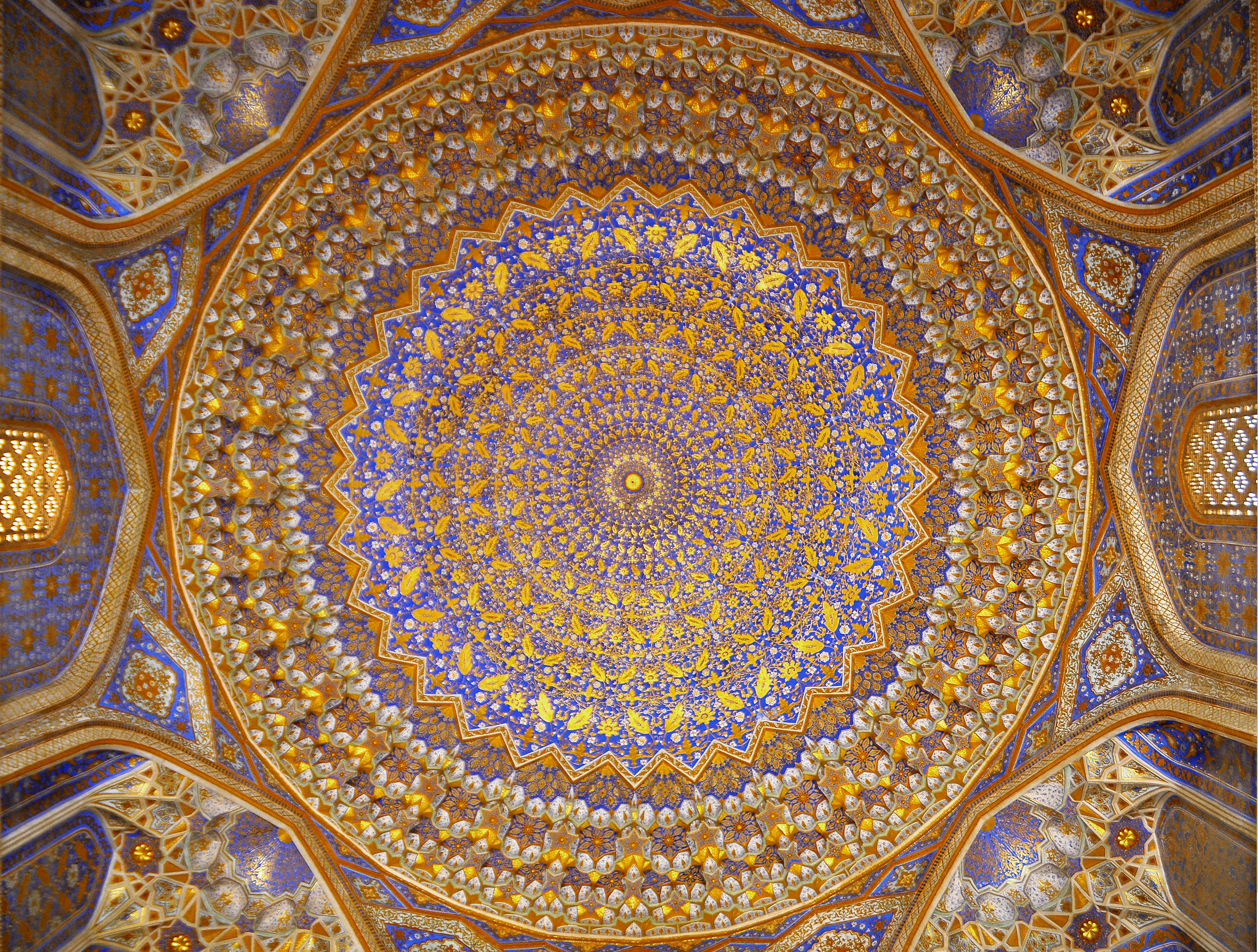
Interior of Tilla Kori Madrasa

== Architectural and historical sights ==
Samarkand with its Registan, Bibi-Khanym Mosque, Gur-Emir and Shah-i-Zinda, Bukhara with its Po-i-Kalyan Complex, Ark citadel, Samanid Mausoleum and Lyabi Khauz Ensemble, and Khiva with its intact inner city, Ichan Kala, mosques, madrasahs, minarets, walls, and gates, are sites of tourism.

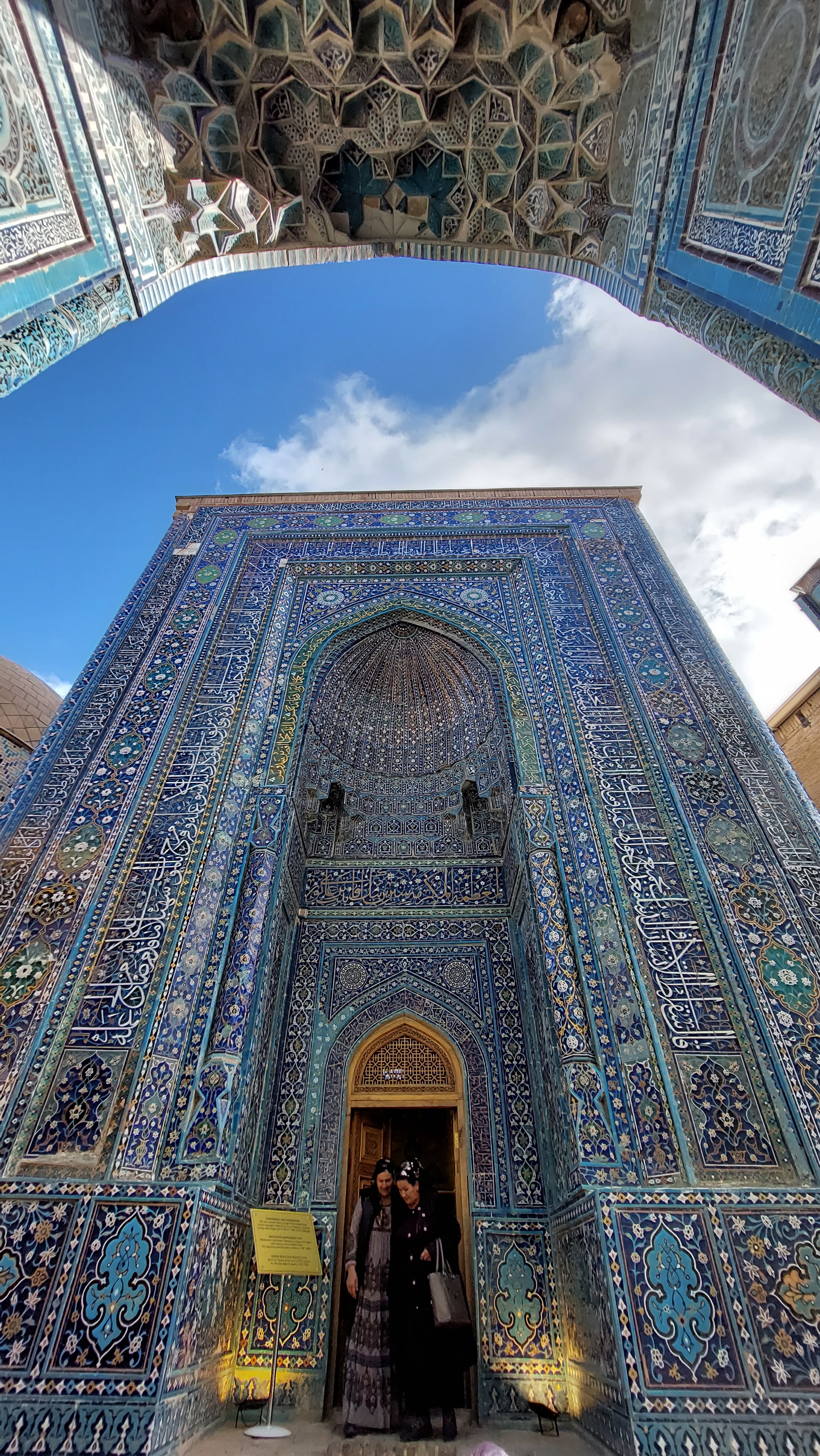
Shah-i Zinda, Samarkand

The historical center of Samarkand is a World Heritage Site. Samarkand is home to cultural and architectural landmarks that are preserved as works of Islamic art and architecture. The necropolis of Shah-i-Zinda is a popular tourist attraction. The general conference of UNESCO accepted the decision of inclusion in the list of anniversaries celebrating the 2750th anniversary of Samarkand.

Tashkent contains sights such as the Hazrati Imam Complex, Mausoleum of Sheikh Zaynudin, Bobo, the Sheihantaur and Mausoleum of Zangiata.

== Tourism in Khorezm Province and Karakalpakstan ==
Ancient Khiva is one of the three most important tourism centers in Uzbekistan. The territory of the Khorezm Province and Karakalpakstan is contains many natural, historic, architectural, and archaeological sites. The Khorezm Province itself possesses nearly 300 historic monuments.

One point of interest is the Savitsky Museum in the town of Nukus, which houses a collection of avant-garde art. The museum also has regional collection. A number of ecological tours are organized to the ship cemetery located in the Muynak area along what was once the coastline of the Aral Sea.

In 2005, Khorezm was visited by 43,000 tourists, of whom 19,700 were foreigners. The majority came from France, Germany, Israel, Great Britain, Australia, and Japan. Khiva's visitors were mostly at the age of 50–70 (46%); about 21% of tourists were of the age 30–40. 32% of the visitors to Khorezm were independent travelers who received visa support from local travel agencies.

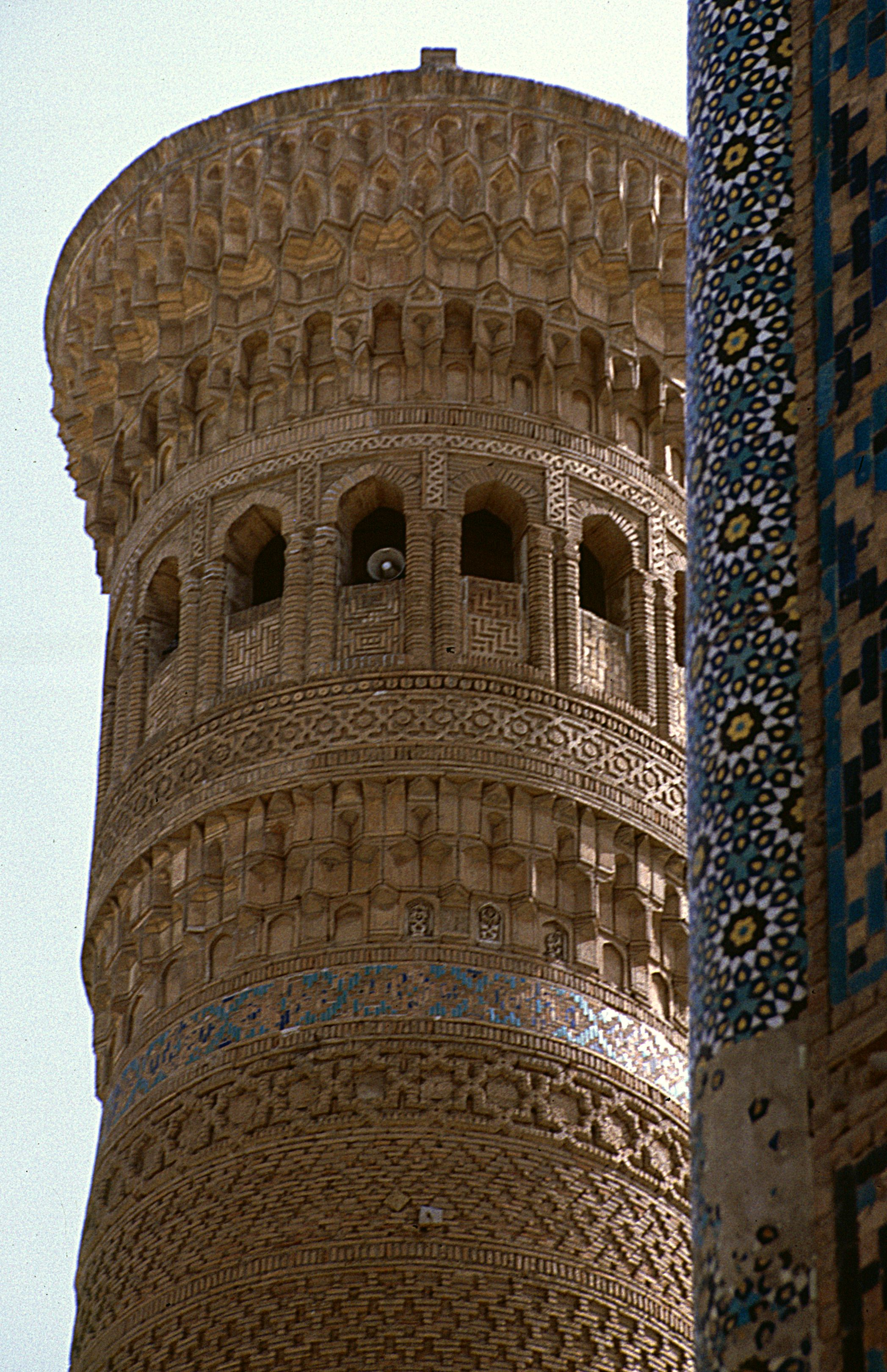
Kalyan Minaret, Bukhara

== Wildlife areas in the desert and other attractions on nomadic ways ==
There is a Kyzyl Kum nature reserve at the flood-land (tugai) drained by the Amu-Darya which has many species of rare animals. In addition, there are many kinds of water birds that migrate the Aral Sea and make their homes around the lake. The region of Aydar Lake allows for tourists to fish, yurt and camel-back ride.

Another reserve Djeyran is located 40 km south of Bukhara.

Another point of interest is Sarmishsay, a gorge located on the southern slopes of the Karatau mountain range, 30–40 km to the northeast of the city of Navoi (Kermine) in Uzbekistan. The area is famous for various ancient monuments of anthropogenic activity concentrated in an area of about 20 km^{2}. This includes flint quarries, mines, old settlements, burial mounds, crypts and petroglyphs, including monuments of the Middle Ages, early Iron Age, Bronze Age and the Stone Age. There are over 4,000 petroglyphs still intact in Sarmishsay. Since ancient times the area has been a sacred zone, where locals performed their sacred ceremonies on holy days.

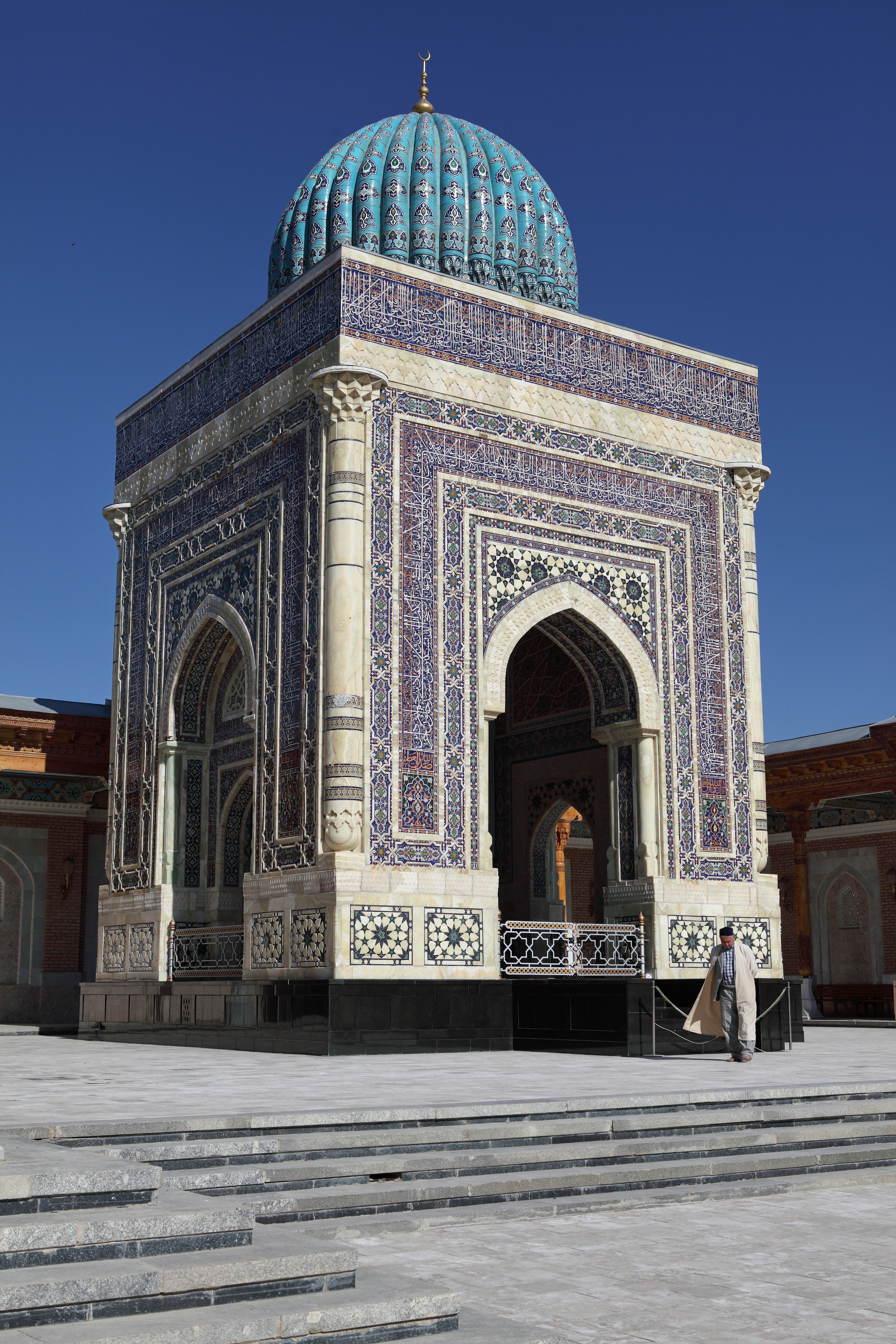
Mausoleum of Imam al-Bukhari

== Religious tourism ==
Uzbekistan is a country with predominantly Islamic roots. More than 160 Muslim sacred relics are located in the country.

Uzbekistan has numerous sites of significant importance to Islam, including the Mausoleum of Sheikh Zaynudin Bobo, Sheihantaur, the Mausoleum of Zangiata in Tashkent, the Bahauddin Complex in Bukhara, the Bayan-Quli Khan Mausoleum, Saif ed-Din Bokharzi Mausoleum, and many other Sufism-related monuments. In March 2026, the Center for Islamic Civilization was opened in Tashkent, with the Samarkand Codex of the Quran of Uthman as its centerpiece.

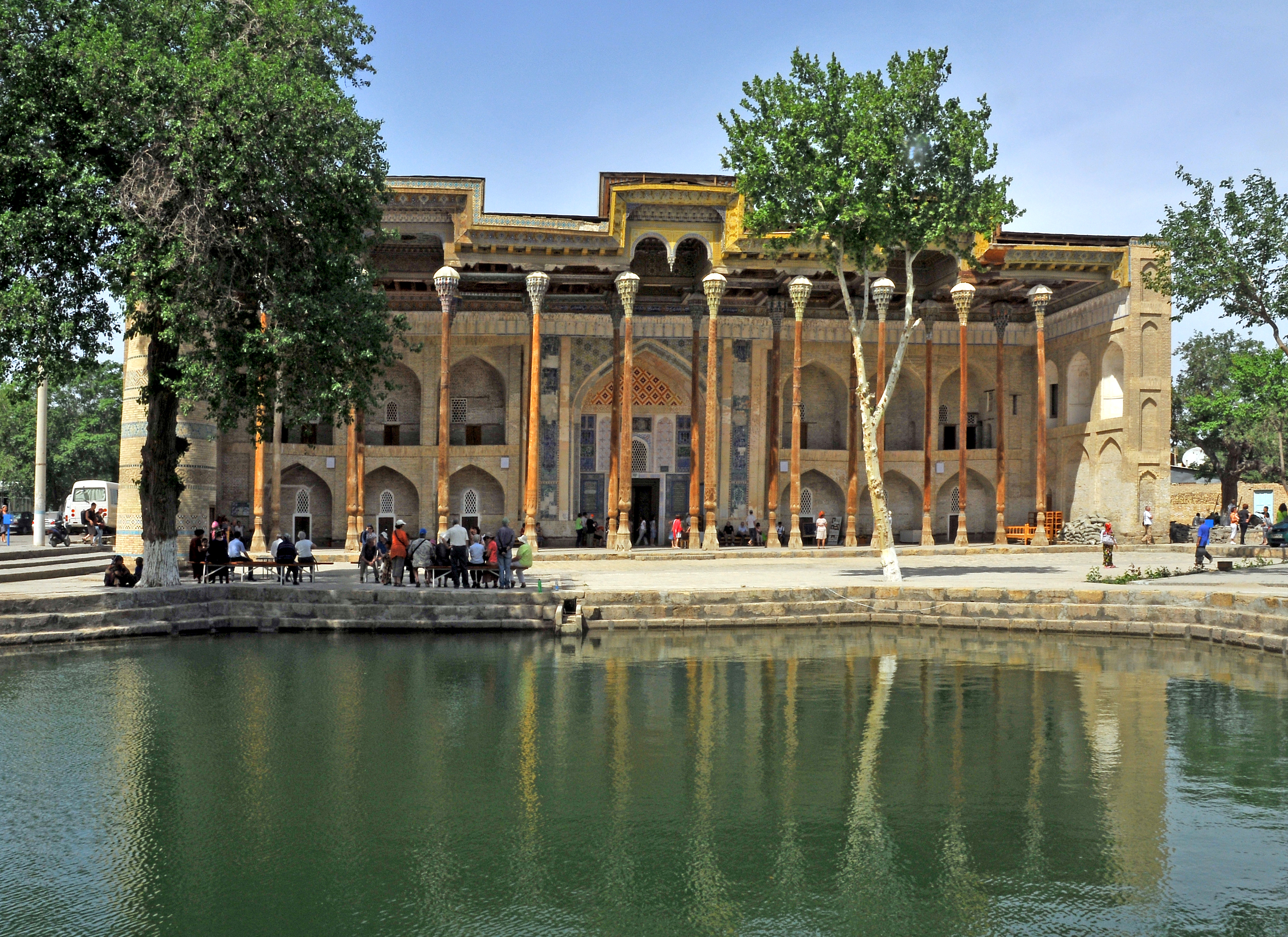
Bolo Haouz Mosque

== Accessibility of the country ==
Most travel involves entering and leaving Uzbekistan through Tashkent, the capital city of Uzbekistan. The city is serviced by an international airport, a domestic airport, two Vokzals (railway stations), and numerous bus stations. Tashkent is serviced by Uzbekistan Airways, Korean Air, airBaltic, Asiana Airlines, Turkish Airlines, Transaero, Aeroflot, Czech airlines, Iran air, air Astana, S7 airlines. Seven more airports have international status, these airports are Samarkand, Bukhara Urgench Namangan Airport, Andizhan Airport, Fergana Airport and Nukus Airport. Besides local flights and some regular international flights, almost exclusively to Russia, along with occasional tourist charters to Samarkand, Bukhara, Nukus and Urgench. The tickets for domestic flights can be reserved or purchased outside of the country at Uzbekistan Airways offices or agencies or via a number of online websites. Uzbekistan Airways transported more than 1.7 million passengers in 2005.

At the end of 2005, the Tashkent airport had put in operation a new arrival hall for local airlines, with the addition meeting modern requirements. Its technical equipment allows it to serve up to 600 passengers per day.

Tourist arrivals of 2024 in %

== Visitors by countries ==
Visitors arriving to Uzbekistan were from the following countries of nationality:

Nationality	2022	2021	2020	2019	2018	2017	2016	2015	2014
Kazakhstan	▲1,551,100	▲565,330	▼424,100	▼2,261,094	▲2,456,866	▲1,783,815	▲1,412,161	▲1,285,008	1,163,984
Tajikistan	▲1,447,800	▼288,210	▼337,500	▼1,473,684	▲1,700,658	▲261,861	▼213,692	▼246,816	291,167
Kyrgyzstan	▲1,356,900	▲652,170	▼508,000	▲1,454,907	▲1,101,477	▲375,017	▲174, 845	▲146,332	119,620
Turkmenistan	No data	No data	▼60,600	▲574,795	▲245,756	▲62,483	▼49,526	▲55,060	44,925
Russia	▲567,700	▲190,490	▼81,600	▼455,470	▲460,166	▲143,900	▼119,049	▼123,153	124,218
Turkey	▲75,600	▲44,170	▼1,400	▼63,539	▲74,802	▲55,238	▲46,069	▼40,389	40,563
Afghanistan	No data	▼34,000	No data	▼62,580	▲71,067	▲32,130	▲24,365	▲21,995	21,249
China	▼5,400	No data	▼7,200	▲54,293	▲37,083	▲19,749	▲16,765	▲16,441	14,818
South Korea	▲19,900	▼5,750	▼6,700	▲35,524	▼32,700	▲37,357	▲31,936	▼30,489	33,323
India	▲16,800	▲10,660	▼4,700	▲27,898	▲22,198	▼15,829	▼18,746	▼19,827	21,707
Germany	▲17,700	▲6,910	▼2,100	▲27,625	▲19,056	▲7,811	▲6,605	▼6,122	8,041
Japan	No data	No data	▼1,400	▲24,944	▲17,237	▲4,086	▲3,012	▼2,306	2,423
France	▲11,000	No data	▼1,100	▲20,390	▲14,195	▲5,748	▲4,889	▼3,670	6,019
Italy	▲8,800	No data	▼900	▲20,356	▲14,156	▲5,162	▲3,057	▼2,601	3,520
USA	▲13,100	▲5,420	▼1,800	▲17,106	▲12,723	▲1,525	▼1,349	▼1,367	1,454
United Kingdom	▲10,500	No data	▼1,400	▲15,962	▲8,941	▲3,256	▲2,217	▲1,959	2,043
Ukraine	No data	▲4,700	▼3,200	▼14,041	▲15,573	▲735	▼664	▼2,431	4,763
Israel	No data	No data	▼1,000	▲13,615	▲10,022	▲4,155	▼3,564	▲3,738	3,414
Iran	No data	No data	▼900	▲13,469	▲10,573	▼3,058	▼5,541	▼6,654	8,445
Azerbaijan	▲10,400	No data	▼2,200	▲12,367	▲11,161	▲4,312	▼2,989	▼3,368	3,878
Spain	▼6,300	No data	No data	▲12,191	▲7,745	▲449	▲353	▼239	1,552
Belarus	No data	▲4,260	▼1,600	▼7,411	▲16,470	▲3,011	▲1,813	▲1,224	666
Pakistan	No data	▲10,740	▼1,800	▼5,791	▲6,032	▲3,799	▲424	▲390	14
Poland	No data	No data	No data	▲5,132	▲3,147	▲115	▲182	▼176	353
Moldova	No data	No data	▼1,000	▼4,601	▲6,215	▼33	▼24	▲34	70
Australia	No data	No data	No data	▲4,588	▲2,549	▼2	▼3	▼4	35
Netherlands	No data	No data	No data	▲4,504	▲3,054	▲30	▼28	▼68	96
Malaysia	No data	No data	No data	▲4,388	▼2,837	▼3,164	▲3,450	▼2,807	3,922
Switzerland	No data	No data	No data	▲3,837	▲3,115	▲63	▼28	▼47	78
Canada	No data	No data	No data	▲3,767	▲1,946	No data	No data	No data	3
Austria	No data	No data	No data	▲3,216	▲2,226	▼29	▼40	▼97	138
Belgium	No data	No data	No data	▲3,044	▲2,235	▲48	▼29	▼67	79
Georgia	No data	No data	No data	▼2,916	▲2,990	▼129	▼177	▲228	135
Indonesia	No data	No data	No data	▲2,702	▲1,702	▼1	No data	No data	No data
UAE	No data	No data	No data	▲2,423	▼1,664	▼5,771	▲5,880	▲5,533	5,003
Taiwan	No data	No data	No data	▲2,131	▲1,381	▼1	No data	No data	3
Latvia	No data	No data	No data	▲1,933	▲1,478	▼291	▼256	▼413	604
Singapore	No data	No data	No data	▲1,820	▲1,804	▼10	No data	▼2	No data
Czech Republic	No data	No data	No data	▲1,804	▲1,547	▼128	▼44	▼71	1,942
Sweden	No data	No data	No data	▲1,782	▲1,092	▲3	No data	▼7	12
Armenia	No data	No data	No data	▲1,740	▲1,529	▼9	▼44	▲23	16
Norway	No data	No data	No data	▲1,659	▲1,168	No data	No data	No data	No data
Thailand	No data	No data	No data	▲1,637	▼1,260	▲1,987	▲1,459	▲1,414	1,348
Denmark	No data	No data	No data	▲1,605	▲775	▼2	No data	▼1	2
Philippines	No data	No data	No data	▲1,510	▲635	▲18	No data	▼8	402
Lithuania	No data	No data	No data	▲1,453	▲873	▼474	▼524	▲804	654
Saudi Arabia	No data	No data	No data	▲1,382	▲974	▼56	▼266	▲290	80
Greece	No data	No data	No data	▲1,211	▲821	▼1	▼3	▼23	41
Slovakia	No data	No data	No data	▲1,112	▲668	▲20	▼17	▼48	55
Bulgaria	No data	No data	No data	▲1,064	▲738	▲17	▲76	▼28	64
Hungary	No data	No data	No data	▲1,047	▲1,014	▲23	▼5	▼20	39
Bangladesh	No data	No data	No data	▲1,039	▲448	▲9	▼6	▲8	18
Statelessness	No data	No data	No data	▼1,024	▲2,558	No data	No data	No data	No data
Finland	No data	No data	No data	▲974	▲635	▼3	▼16	20	No data
Egypt	No data	No data	No data	▲923	▲689	▲4	No data	No data	No data
Romania	No data	No data	No data	▲920	▲508	▲1	No data	No data	17
Portugal	No data	No data	No data	▲916	▲683	No data	No data	No data	No data
Estonia	No data	No data	No data	▲908	▲421	▲1	▼22	28	
New Zealand	No data	No data	No data	▲809	▲555	No data	▲1	No data	No data
Serbia	No data	No data	No data	▲776	▲654	No data	No data	No data	No data
Mongolia	No data	No data	No data	▲726	▲269	▲92	▲66	▲11	No data
Ireland	No data	No data	No data	▲702	▲414	No data	No data	No data	No data
Brazil	No data	No data	No data	▲680	▲516	No data	No data	No data	No data
Slovenia	No data	No data	No data	▲542	▲455	▲2	▼1	▼22	75
Jordan	No data	No data	No data	▲532	▲354	▲12	No data	No data	30
South Africa	No data	No data	No data	▲431	▲214	No data	No data	No data	No data
Mexico	No data	No data	No data	▲421	▲270	No data	No data	No data	No data
Vietnam	No data	No data	No data	▲414	▼269	▼433	▲464	▲237	56
Kuwait	No data	No data	No data	▲386	▲302	▲51	No data	▼50	55
Syria	No data	No data	No data	▲331	▲314	No data	No data	No data	1
Argentina	No data	No data	No data	▲319	▲220	No data	No data	▲1	No data
Iraq	No data	No data	No data	▲313	▲195	No data	No data	No data	7
Oman	No data	No data	No data	▲296	▲248	▼9	▼2	No data	97
Croatia	No data	No data	No data	▲288	▲245	▲6	No data	No data	3
Colombia	No data	No data	No data	▲235	▲232	No data	No data	No data	No data
Nepal	No data	No data	No data	▲230	▲143	▼7	No data	No data	384
Nigeria	No data	No data	No data	▲216	▲156	No data	No data	No data	No data
Morocco	No data	No data	No data	▲213	▲153	No data	No data	No data	No data
Luxembourg	No data	No data	No data	▲174	▲168	No data	No data	No data	11
Sri Lanka	No data	No data	No data	▲151	▼123	No data	No data	No data	164
Chile	No data	No data	No data	▼144	▲149	No data	No data	No data	No data
Cyprus	No data	No data	No data	▲139	▲77	No data	No data	No data	2
Qatar	No data	No data	No data	▼137	▲174	▲76	No data	No data	40
Yemen	No data	No data	No data	▲132	▲91	No data	No data	No data	18
Bosnia and Herzegovina	No data	No data	No data	▲130	▲91	No data	No data	No data	No data
Algeria	No data	No data	No data	▼120	▲156	No data	No data	No data	No data
Tunisia	No data	No data	No data	▼115	▲169	No data	No data	No data	No data
Bahrain	No data	No data	No data	▲111	▲65	No data	No data	No data	No data
Palestine	No data	No data	No data	▼108	▲111	No data	No data	No data	No data
DPRK	No data	No data	No data	▲102	▲49	No data	No data	No data	No data
Malta	No data	No data	No data	▲98	▲42	No data	No data	No data	
North Macedonia	No data	No data	No data	▲78	▲47	No data	No data	No data	No data
Cameroon	No data	No data	No data	▲77	▲16	No data	No data	No data	No data
Albania	No data	No data	No data	▲63	▲33	No data	No data	No data	No data
Myanmar	No data	No data	No data	▲61	▲44	No data	No data	No data	No data
Peru	No data	No data	No data	▲61	▲35	No data	No data	No data	No data
Brunei	No data	No data	No data	▲55	▲15	No data	No data	No data	No data
Iceland	No data	No data	No data	▲50	▲28	No data	No data	No data	No data
Ghana	No data	No data	No data	▲49	▲17	No data	No data	No data	No data
Sudan	No data	No data	No data	▲48	▲47	No data	No data	No data	No data
Cambodia	No data	No data	No data	▲46	▲12	No data	No data	No data	No data
Ethiopia	No data	No data	No data	▲45	▲25	No data	No data	▲16	No data
Kenya	No data	No data	No data	▼44	▲65	No data	No data	No data	No data
Montenegro	No data	No data	No data	▲38	▲25	No data	No data	No data	No data
Ecuador	No data	No data	No data	▼35	▲36	No data	No data	No data	No data
Venezuela	No data	No data	No data	▼34	▲100	No data	No data	No data	No data
Mauritius	No data	No data	No data	▲33	▲17	No data	No data	No data	No data
Saint Kitts and Nevis	No data	No data	No data	▲32	▲15	No data	No data	No data	No data
Zimbabwe	No data	No data	No data	▲32	▲13	No data	No data	No data	No data
Ivory Coast	No data	No data	No data	▲31	▲4	No data	No data	No data	No data
Andorra	No data	No data	No data	▼29	▲39	No data	No data	No data	No data
Comoros	No data	No data	No data	▼29	▲31	No data	No data	No data	No data
Cuba	No data	No data	No data	▼29	▲35	No data	No data	No data	No data
Costa Rica	No data	No data	No data	▲27	▲19	No data	No data	No data	No data
Uruguay	No data	No data	No data	▲26	▲11	No data	No data	No data	No data
Laos	No data	No data	No data	▲25	▲19	No data	No data	No data	No data
Dominica	No data	No data	No data	▲24	▲12	No data	No data	No data	No data
Bhutan	No data	No data	No data	▲21	▲14	No data	No data	No data	8
Zambia	No data	No data	No data	▲21	▲9	No data	No data	No data	No data
Senegal	No data	No data	No data	▲19	▲6	No data	No data	No data	No data
Guinea	No data	No data	No data	▲18	▲11	No data	No data	No data	No data
Marshall Islands	No data	No data	No data	▼18	▲41	No data	No data	No data	No data
Bolivia	No data	No data	No data	▼17	▲21	No data	No data	No data	No data
DRC	No data	No data	No data	▲17	▲10	No data	No data	No data	No data
Uganda	No data	No data	No data	▲17	▲15	No data	No data	No data	1
Kiribati	No data	No data	No data	▲16	▲2	No data	No data	No data	No data
Monaco	No data	No data	No data	▲16	▲4	No data	No data	No data	No data
Libya	No data	No data	No data	▲13	▲6	No data	No data	No data	No data
Tanzania	No data	No data	No data	▼13	▲14	No data	No data	No data	No data
El Salvador	No data	No data	No data	▲12	▲6	No data	No data	No data	No data
Jamaica	No data	No data	No data	▲11	▲1	No data	No data	No data	No data
Maldives	No data	No data	No data	▲11	▲8	No data	No data	No data	No data
Dominican Republic	No data	No data	No data	▲10	▲1	No data	No data	No data	No data
Paraguay	No data	No data	No data	▲10	▲3	No data	No data	No data	No data
Honduras	No data	No data	No data	▲9	▲8	No data	No data	No data	No data
Mali	No data	No data	No data	▲9	▲1	No data	No data	No data	No data
São Tomé and Príncipe	No data	No data	No data	▲9	▲8	No data	No data	No data	No data
Angola	No data	No data	No data	▲8	▲2	No data	No data	No data	No data
Burundi	No data	No data	No data	▲8	0	No data	No data	No data	No data
Fiji	No data	No data	No data	▲8	▲5	No data	No data	No data	No data
Panama	No data	No data	No data	▲8	▲2	No data	No data	No data	No data
Botswana	No data	No data	No data	▲7	0	No data	No data	No data	No data
Nicaragua	No data	No data	No data	▲7	▲5	No data	No data	No data	No data
Eswatini	No data	No data	No data	▲7	0	No data	No data	No data	No data
Mauritania	No data	No data	No data	▲6	▲2	No data	No data	No data	No data
Rwanda	No data	No data	No data	▼6	▲8	No data	No data	No data	No data
San Marino	No data	No data	No data	▲6	▲2	No data	No data	No data	No data
Somalia	No data	No data	No data	▲6	▲5	No data	No data	No data	No data
Guatemala	No data	No data	No data	▼5	▲6	No data	No data	No data	No data
Trinidad and Tobago	No data	No data	No data	▼5	▲8	No data	No data	No data	No data
Burkina Faso	No data	No data	No data	▲4	0	No data	No data	No data	No data
Eritrea	No data	No data	No data	▲4	▲3	No data	No data	No data	No data
Guyana	No data	No data	No data	▲4	▲1	No data	No data	No data	No data
Haiti	No data	No data	No data	▲4	▲4	No data	No data	No data	No data
Namibia	No data	No data	No data	▼4	▲6	No data	No data	No data	No data
Niger	No data	No data	No data	▲4	▲1	No data	No data	No data	No data
Chad	No data	No data	No data	▲3	▲1	No data	No data	No data	No data
Gambia	No data	No data	No data	▲3	▲3	No data	No data	No data	No data
Malawi	No data	No data	No data	▲3	▲1	No data	No data	No data	No data
Vanuatu	No data	No data	No data	▲3	▲1	No data	No data	No data	No data
Antigua and Barbuda	No data	No data	No data	▼2	▲5	No data	No data	No data	No data
Barbados	No data	No data	No data	▲2	0	No data	No data	No data	No data
Djibouti	No data	No data	No data	▲2	0	No data	No data	No data	No data
Benin	No data	No data	No data	▼2	▲4	No data	No data	No data	No data
Gabon	No data	No data	No data	▲2	▲1	No data	No data	No data	No data
Grenada	No data	No data	No data	▲2	▲1	No data	No data	No data	No data
Netherlands Antilles	No data	No data	No data	▲2	0	No data	No data	No data	No data
Togo	No data	No data	No data	▲2	0	No data	No data	No data	No data
Tokelau	No data	No data	No data	▼2	▲8	No data	No data	No data	No data
Turks and Caicos Islands	No data	No data	No data	▲2	0	No data	No data	No data	No data
Bermuda	No data	No data	No data	▲1	▲1	No data	No data	No data	No data
Cape Verde	No data	No data	No data	▲1	0	No data	No data	No data	No data
Central African Republic	No data	No data	No data	▲1	0	No data	No data	No data	No data
Madagascar	No data	No data	No data	▼1	▲3	No data	No data	No data	No data
Mozambique	No data	No data	No data	▲1	0	No data	No data	No data	No data
Saint Helena	No data	No data	No data	▲1	0	No data	No data	No data	No data
Saint Lucia	No data	No data	No data	▲1	0	No data	No data	No data	No data
Surinam	No data	No data	No data	▲1	0	No data	No data	No data	No data
Vatican	No data	No data	No data	▼1	▲3	No data	No data	No data	No data
Bahamas	No data	No data	No data	▼0	▲1	No data	No data	No data	No data
French Polynesia	No data	No data	No data	▼0	▲1	No data	No data	No data	No data
Nauru	No data	No data	No data	▼0	▲2	No data	No data	No data	No data
Papua New Guinea	No data	No data	No data	▼0	▲1	No data	No data	No data	No data
Sierra Leone	No data	No data	No data	▼0	▲1	No data	No data	No data	No data
United States Virgin Islands	No data	No data	No data	▼0	▲2	No data	No data	No data	No data
Total	▲5,232,800	▲1,881,350	▼1,504,100	▲6,748,512	▲6,432,983	▲2,847,877	▲2,157,676	▲2,034,253	▲1,938,035

== Photo gallery ==
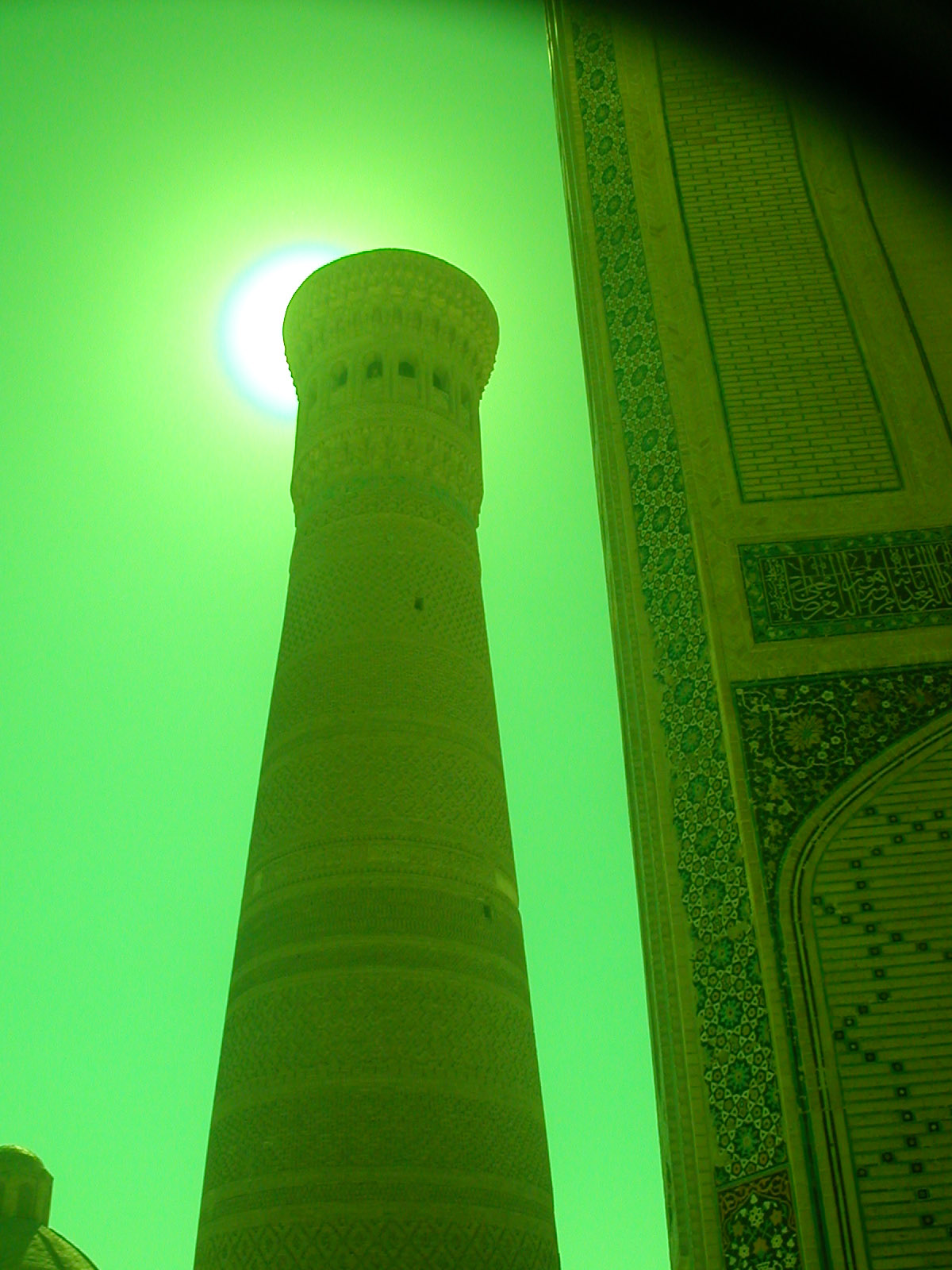
Kalyan Minaret that rises above the Bukhara city in the form of a huge vertical pillar

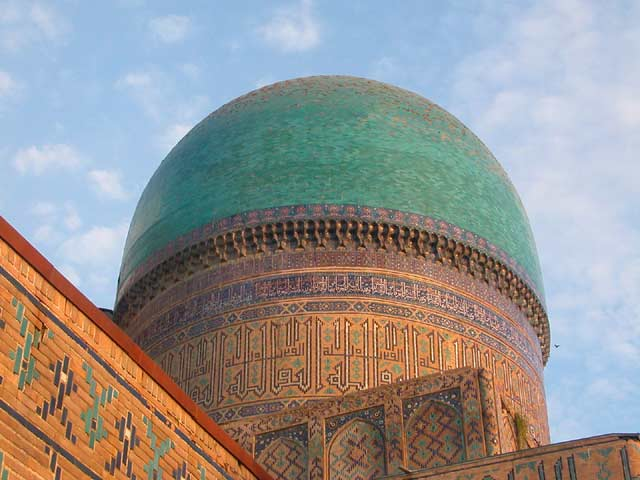
The cupola of Bibi-Khanym Mosque, Samarkand

== See also ==
- Visa policy of Uzbekistan
