= Mausoleum of Sheikh Zaynudin =

Mausoleum in Uzbekistan

Coordinates: 41°19′26.04″N 69°12′11.88″E

The Mausoleum of Sheikh Zaynudin Bobo is located in Tashkent, Uzbekistan.

The Sheikh Zaynudin Bobo was a writer and popularizer of the Sufi order known as Suhrawardiyya. The exact date of his birth is unknown. It is believed that Sheikh Zaynudin died when he was 95. Arguably he was a son of the founder of the Suhrawardiyya order, Diya al-din Abu 'n-Najib as-Surawardi (1097–1168), who sent his son Sheikh Zaynudin to Tashkent to spread the ideas of his order. Sheikh Zaynudin is said to have been conveyed to earth at the graveyard of Orifon village beyond the Kukcha Gate (now within the Tashkent). There is an underground cell (chillahona) dating to the 12th century in the mausoleum, where Sheikh Zaynudin conducted his 40-day meditations (chilla) and chartakdating back to the 14th century.

The mausoleum was built in the 16th century and was rebuilt in the late 19th century. The proportions are 18 x 16 meters and it is 20.7 meters high.

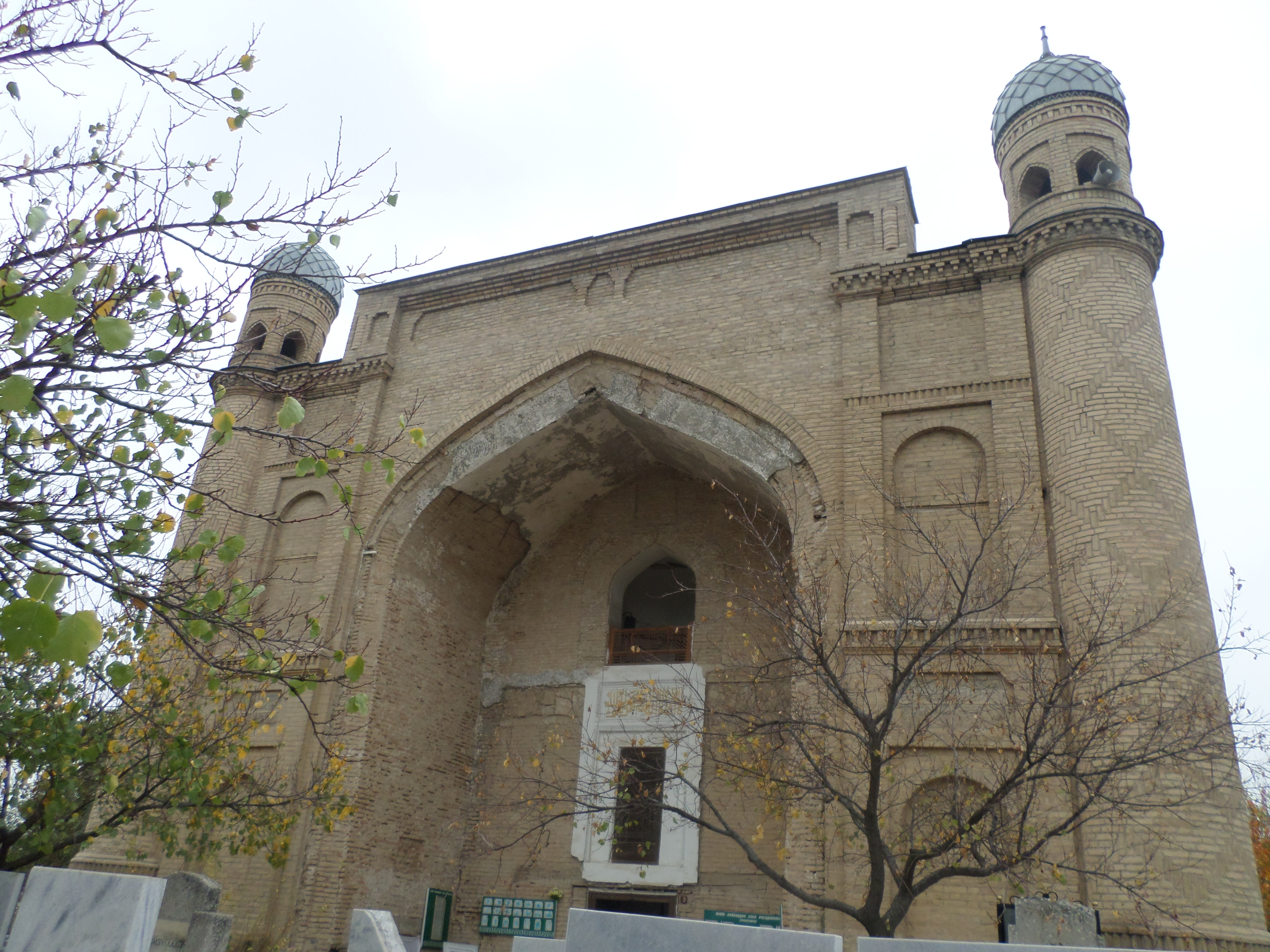

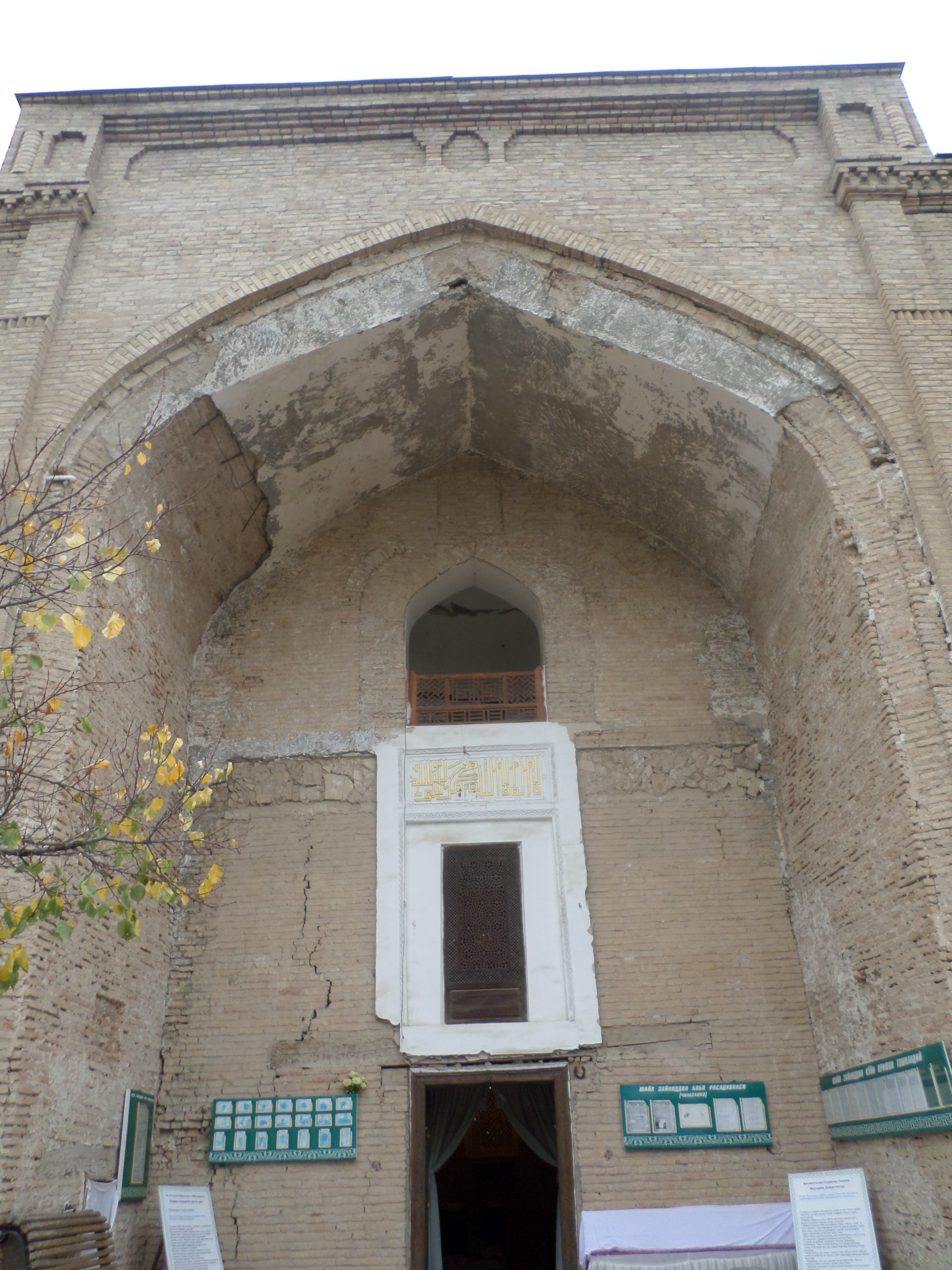

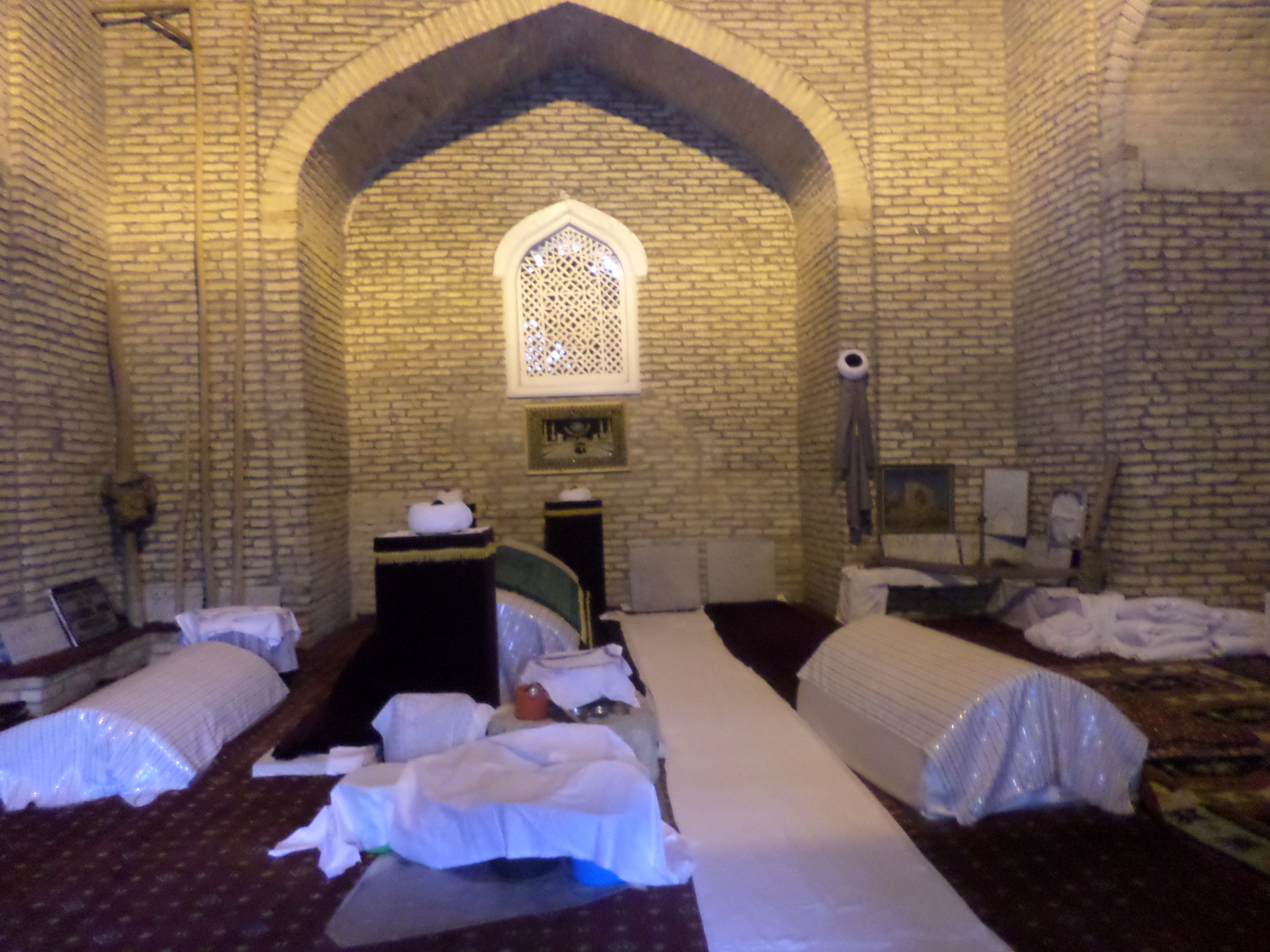

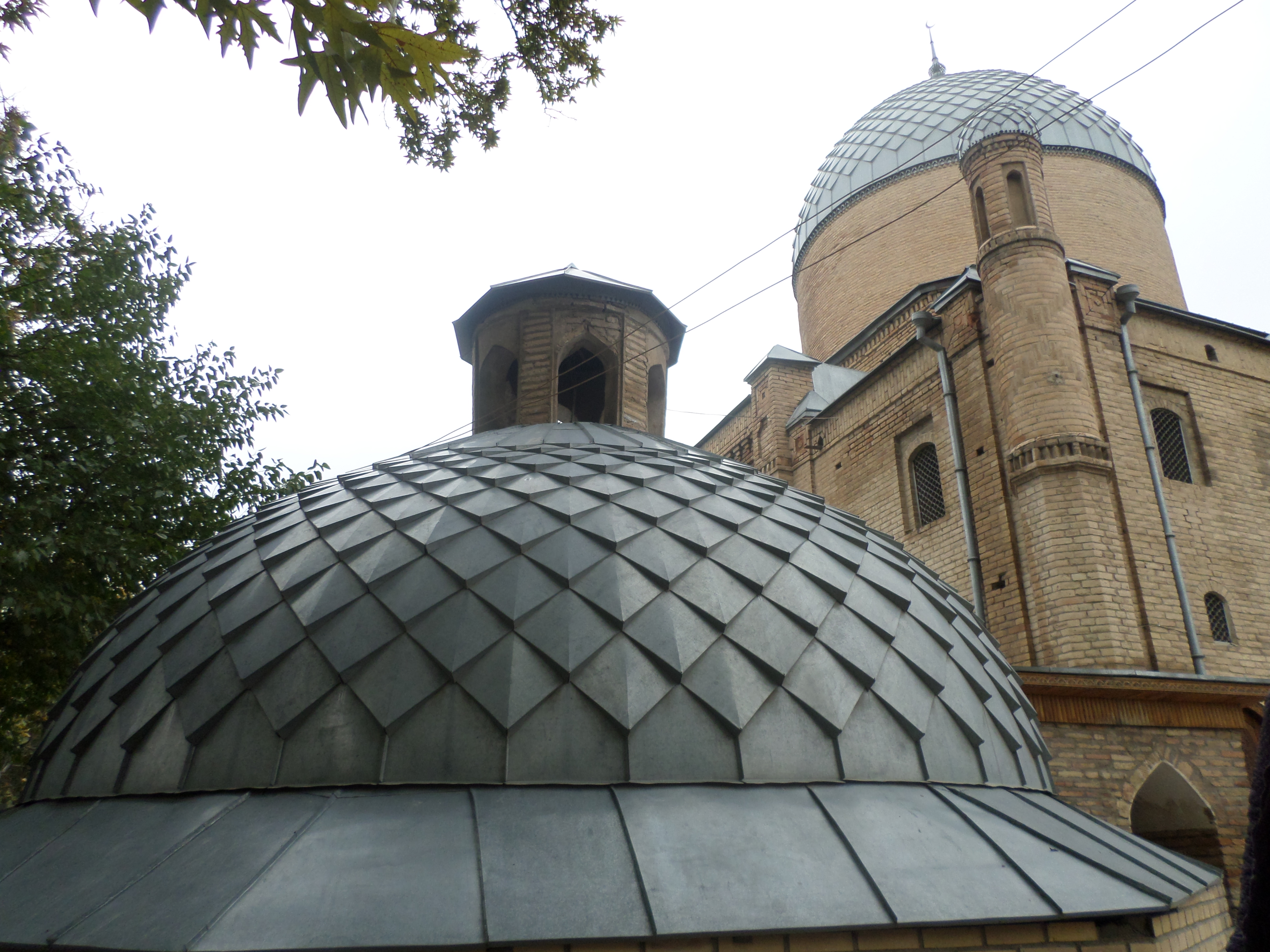

== See also ==
- Sheihantaur Mausoleum
- Tourism in Uzbekistan
