= Najm al-Din Kubra =

13th-century Sufi, founder of the Kubrawiya order

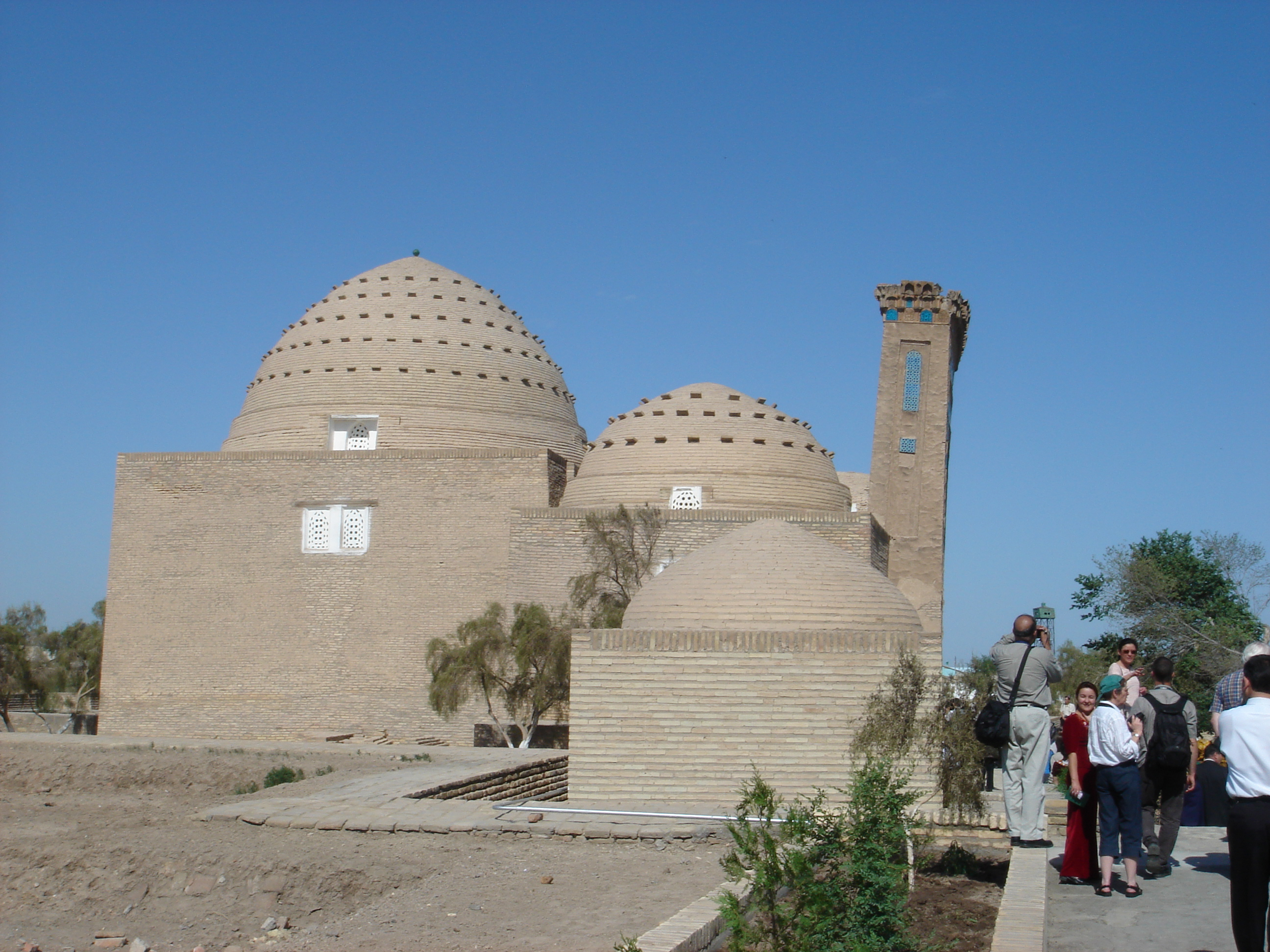
- Najm al-Din Kubra

Personal life
- Born: 1145 CE (540 AH) Khiva, Khwarazmian empire
- Died: 1221 CE (618 AH) Konye-Urgench, Khwarazmian empire
- Resting place: Konye-Urgench, Turkmenistan
- Era: Islamic Golden Age
- Region: Konye-Urgench
- Main interest: Sufism

Religious life
- Religion: Islam
- Denomination: Sunni
- Jurisprudence: Shafi'i school
- Tariqa: Kubrawiya (founder)
- Creed: Ash'ari

Najm ad-Din Kubra (Persian: نجم‌الدین کبری) was a 13th-century Khwarezmian Sufi from Khwarezm and the founder of the Kubrawiya, influential in the Ilkhanate and Timurid dynasty. His method, exemplary of a "golden age" of Sufi metaphysics, was related to the Illuminationism of Shahab al-Din Yahya ibn Habash Suhrawardi as well as to Rumi's Shams Tabrizi. Kubra was born in 540/1145 and died in 618/1221.

== Biography ==
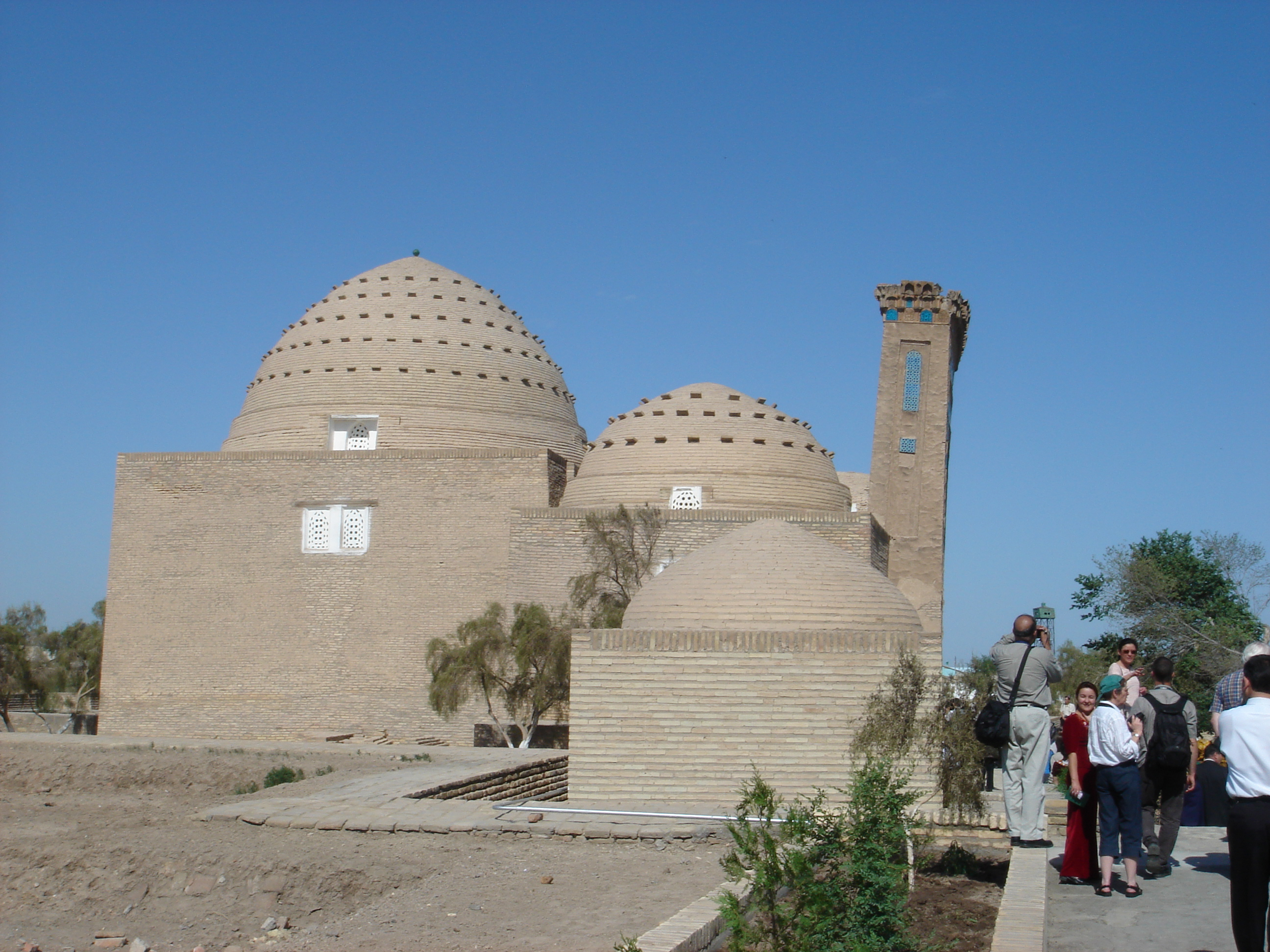
Najm ad-Din al-Kubra Mausoleum in Konye-Urgench, Turkmenistan

Born in 540/1145 in Khiva, Najmuddin Kubra began his career as a scholar of hadith and kalam. His interest in Sufism began in Egypt where he became a murid of Ruzbihan Baqli, who was an initiate of the Uwaisi. After years of study, he abandoned his exploration of the religious sciences and devoted himself entirely to the Sufi way of life.

Sufi sheikh Zia al-Din-'Ammar Bitlisi was Kubra's teacher, who tried to present Sufi thought in a new way to provide contemplation and influence for the reader. After receiving his khirka, Kubra gained a large following of gnostics and writers on Sufism.

Because his followers were predominantly Sufi writers and gnostics, Kubra was given the title "manufacturer of saints" (in Persian: vali tarash) and his order was named the Kubrawiya.

Kubra's main body of works concerns the analysis of the visionary experience. He wrote numerous important works discussing the visionary experience, including a Sufi commentary on the Quran that he was unable to complete due to his death in 618/1221. Kubra died during the Mongol invasion and massacre after refusing to leave his city, where he fought in hand-to-hand combat against the Mongols.

Overall, Kubra is remembered as a pioneer of the Sufi tradition and explanation of spiritual visionary experiences. Kubra's work spread throughout the Middle East and Central Asia where it flourished for many years, until it gradually was taken over by other similar more popular ideologies and Sufi leaders.

== His Work ==
In addition to his work centering on the Sufi commentary of the Qu'ran, Kubra wrote other important treatises including:

- Fawa'ih al-djamal wa-fawatih al-djalal
- Usul al-'ashara
- Risalat al-kha'if al-ha'im min lawmat al-la'im

His works discuss the analysis of dreams and visions, such as the "significance of dreams and visions, the degrees of luminous epiphany that are manifested to the mystic, the different classes of concept and image that engage his attention, and the nature and interrelations of man's 'subtle centres.'" The interpretation and understanding of dreams was important because Muhammad had developed the Islamic faith based on dreams and visions, so the Qu'ran was seen as a visionary text. The Kubrawiya order were avid practitioners of seeking the meaning of visions through ritual performances and meditation. Kubra, being the manufacturer of saints, led him to analyze popular dream episodes from Muslim hagiographical works, and his disciples would follow in his analysis of these well known and important works.

== The Kubrawiyah Order ==
The Kubrawiya was Kubra's Sufi order, focusing on explaining the visionary experience. The influence of the Kubrawiya can be seen on the Islamic world as a whole because of its relationship to the strong influence of Shi'ism in Iran. The Kubrawiya was not largely popular until after Kubra's death in the 13th century. The Kubrawiya found great development outside of Central Asia, but its influence and presence only lasted till the 15th/16th century, when it was overshadowed by the Naqshbandiya (another, more attractive Sufi group) during the Ottoman Empire, though a nominal following continued on. Before this occurred, the order split after the leadership of Isḥāḳ al-Khuttalānī (d. 1423) into the Nurbakshiyya and the Dhahabiyya. The former were eventually persecuted under the Safavids in the later 16th century, whereas the latter survives presently with Shiraz as its centre.

The Kubrawiya's influence in Central Asia established many political, social, and economic activities there, but the Naqshbandiyah developed these ideas to their fullest potential. The Kubrawiya's main teaching was a "well-developed mystical psychology based on the analysis of the visionary experience." They focused on explaining the spiritual visionary experiences that Sufis underwent in everyday life. Their largest concern was the total focus on the zikr as a means of allowing for the perception of spiritual visions.

=== Firdausiyya Order ===
The Firdausi Kubrawi order was popularized in the Bihar region of India by Makhdoom Sharfuddin Ahmed Yahya Maneri Al-Zubayri who is buried in Biharsharif. The branch Firdausia's lineage from Najmuddin Kubra is through his disciple Saif ed-Din al-Boharsi through Sheikh Badruddin Samarqandi through Sheikh Ruknuddin Firdausi through Sheikh Najeeduddin Firdausi of Mehrauli, Delhi, who was Makhdoom Sheikh Sharafuddin Ahmad Yahya Maneri Hashmi's peer.

== His disciples ==
Among Kubra's twelve students were Najmeddin Razi, Sayfeddin Bakhezri, Majd al-Dīn Baghdādī, Ali ibn lala ghznavi and Baha'uddin Walad, father of Jalaluddin Rumi. However, one of his most well-known and influential disciples though was Sa'd al-Din Hamuwayi. Kubra informed Hamuwayi to leave the city in which they resided with the impending Mongol invasion on the horizon. However, Hamuwayi stayed with Kubra and received his ijaza from him, which shows his favorable reputation with the Sufi Master, as not only a student, but as a friend. Hamuwayi wrote over thirty important manuscripts and other works concerning the work of Kubra, and the influence of the Kubrawiyah.

== See also ==
- List of Persian scientists and scholars
- Henry Corbin
- Ruzbihan Baqli
- Seyyed Qutb al-Din Mohammad Neyrizi
