= Amirsoy Mountain Resort =

Uzbekistani ski resort

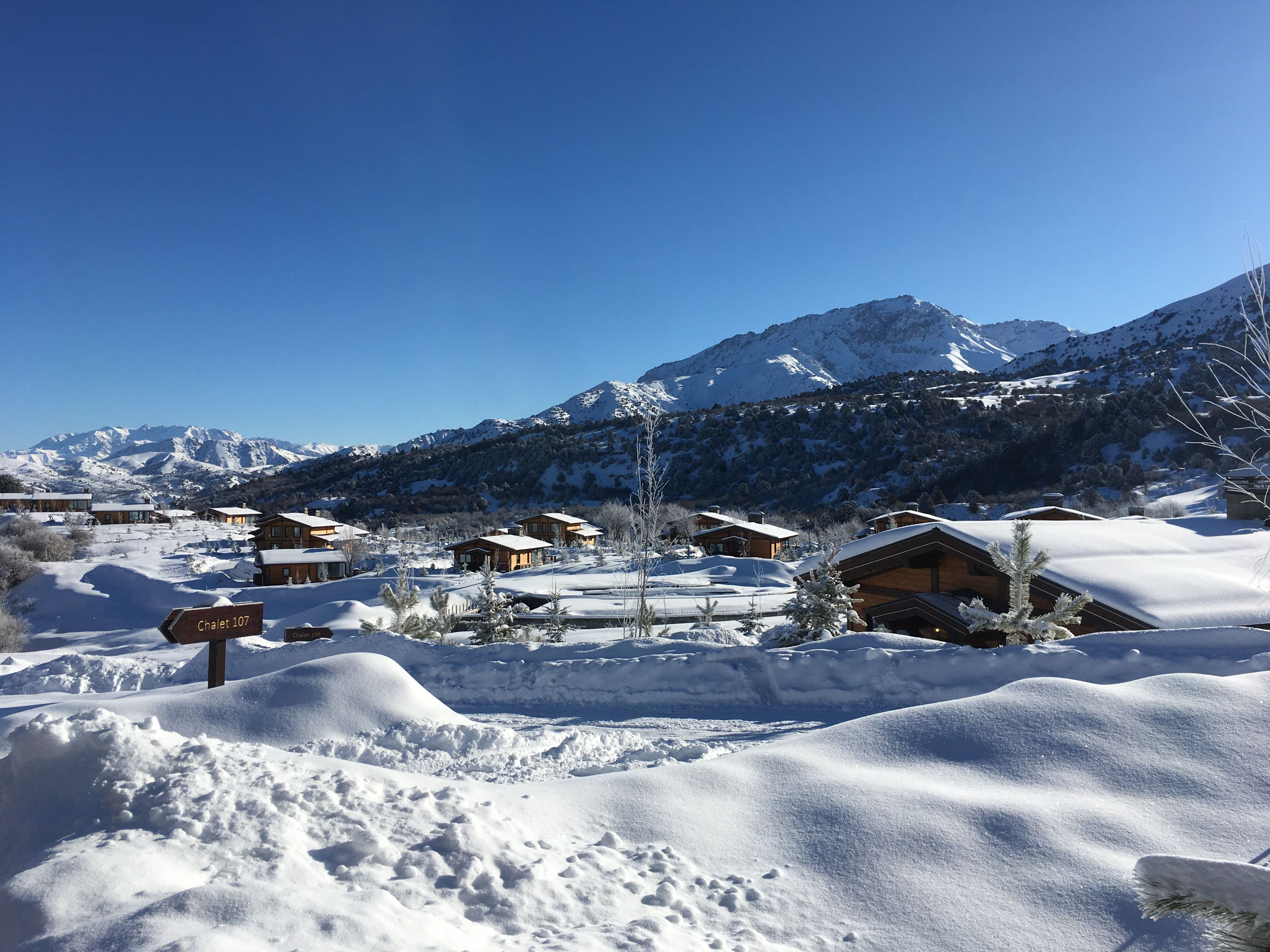
- Chalets at Amirsoy Resort

- Location within Uzbekistan
- Location: Uzbekistan
- Nearest major city: Tashkent
- Coordinates: 41.486706°N 69.942341°E
- Top elevation: 2,290 metres (7,500 ft) AMSL
- Trails: 10 —5: Learning/beginner —1: Easy —4: Intermediate
- Lift system: 7 lifts 1 gondolas 1 chairlifts 5 magic carpets
- Website: https://www.amirsoy.com/en/

Amirsoy Mountain Resort is the largest ski resort in Uzbekistan, and the most modern ski resort in Central Asia. It opened in 2019 in the Western Tian Shan, a UNESCO World Heritage Site, and has been described by Lonely Planet as “next-season St Moritz.”.

== History ==
Uzbekistan’s winter sports industry dates back to the Soviet period when ski resorts were built at Beldersoy and Chimgan in the Western Tian Shan Mountains in Tashkent Region.

The Amirsoy Mountain Resort was conceived in 2017 by Uzbek businessman Rashvan Ubaidullaev. In the first phase of development, Ubaidullaev and his co-investors invested €100m to create the resort, including supporting infrastructure such as access roads. They appointed Andorra-based PGI Management to design and manage the resort.

Amirsoy was originally expected to open in December 2018, but the opening was delayed due to infrastructure problems. Amirsoy therefore opened officially in December 2019 with a 2 km long Doppelmayr gondola and chairlift and a Sunkid conveyor, as well as two lifts for tubing.

In summer 2020, further construction took place at Amirsoy to expand the resort and increase the number of facilities. This included installation of a Poma Telemix lift and the creation of additional ski runs. There will be 13 runs by 2022.

Ubaidullaev was awarded Uzbekistan's Turizm Fidoyisi medal of honor for services to tourism on World Tourism Day 2020.

In the long-term it is planned to upgrade the old Beldersoy and Chimgan resorts and to link them to Amirsoy to create a Central Asian rival to France's Les Trois Vallées or Canada's Whistler Blackcomb.

== Location ==
Amirsoy is situated in the Tashkent Region of Uzbekistan, 65 km east of Tashkent. It takes approximately 90 minutes to drive to Amirsoy from the closest airport, Islam Karimov Tashkent International Airport.

The Amirsoy resort covers an area of 900 hectares on the northern slope of Maygashkan Mountain, part of the Chatkal Range in the Western Tian Shan. The elevation of the ski slopes is between 1,630m and 2,275m.

== Resort ==
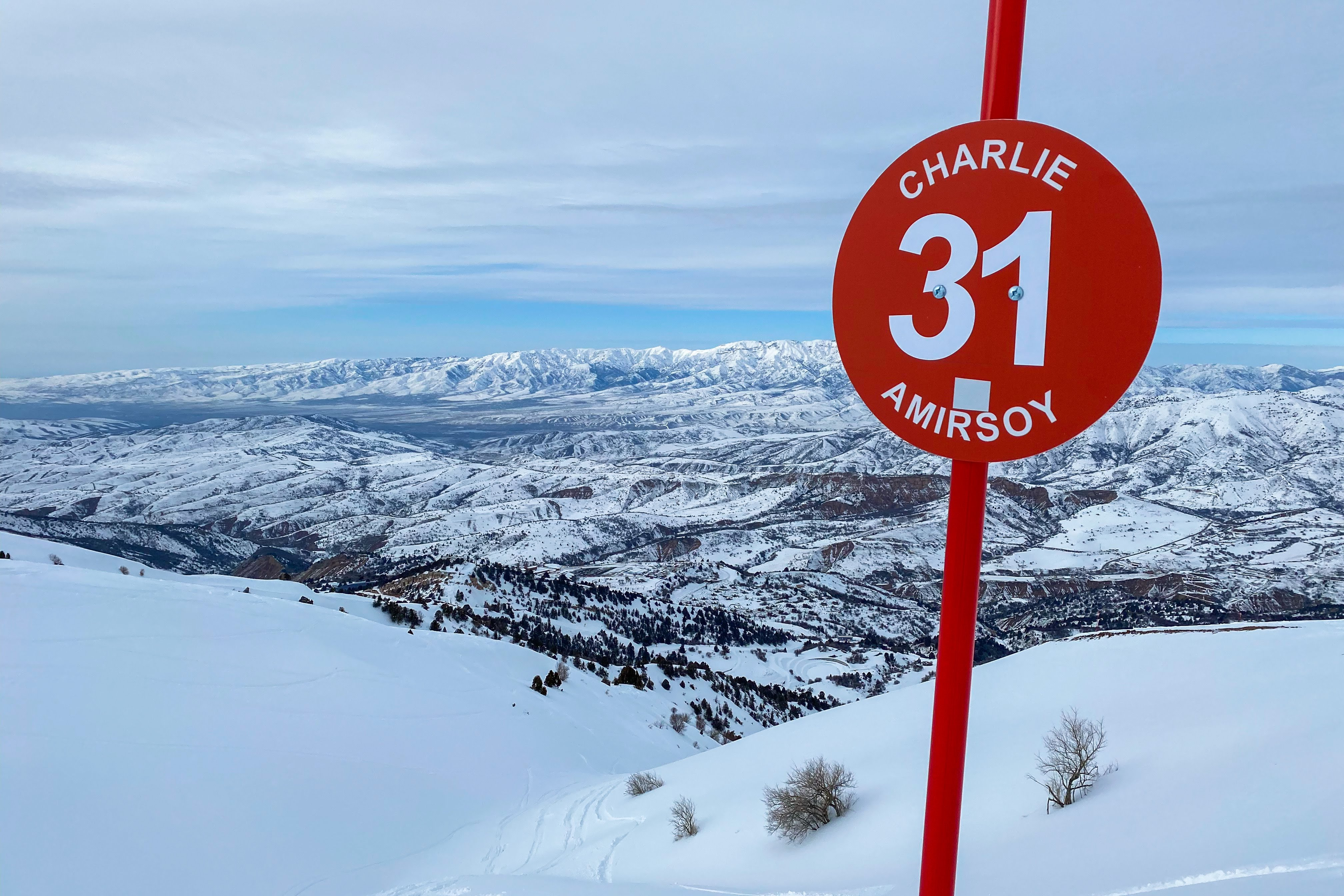
Amirsoy Mountain Range

Amirsoy opened in winter 2019 with 11 ski slopes running for a length of 15 km. A further nine km of runs were constructed in summer 2020 in time for the 2020/21 ski season, and there will be 28 runs by 2022. The majority of runs are suitable for beginner and intermediate skiers: black runs will be added later, but there are already numerous opportunities for off-piste skiing.

The gondolas and lifts at Amirsoy are manufactured by Doppelmayr and Poma, and TechnoAlpin produced the snow machines. The conveyor is by Sunkid and the snow groomers are by PistenBully. Amirsoy has been designed to be accessible for disabled skiers, and equipment and instruction is available for adaptive skiing. The snow at Amirsoy is very dry, in spite of its relatively low elevation, and as night time temperatures regularly fall to −12 Celsius, there is no shortage of good quality powder. Thomas Thor Jensen Director of Operations for PGI Management, claims that the quality of Amirsoy's snowfall even rivals that of Japan.

The majority of skiers at Amirsoy are from Uzbekistan: an estimated 150,000 locals visited in the first three months after the resort opened, and owner Ubaidullaev is aiming to build a national ski culture from the ground up. The cost of a day's ski pass is UZS 180,000 (approximately €15) and discounts are available for children, pensioners, and the disabled Accommodation at Amirsoy is at Le Chalet by Amirsoy, a village of luxurious 40 wooden chalets with open fireplaces close to the lifts. 90% of the energy for the chalets comes from solar panels. A 4* resort hotel is also planned. Amirsoy's restaurants are in geodesic domes which resemble igloos, and permanent buildings are under construction.
