= Sayf al-Din Bakharzi =

13th-century poet and theologian

Two domes of Saif ed-Din Boharsi Mausoleum organize building's side-view.

Abū al-Maʿālī Sayf al-Dīn Saʿīd b. al-Muṭahhar b. Saʿīd Bākharzī (al-Bākharzī, Persian: باخرزی (1190–1261) shortened as Sayf al-Dīn Bākharzī, was a poet, sheikh, and theologian who lived in the 13th century. As suggested by his nisba, he was born and raised in Bakharz, a district of the province of Quhistan in Khorasan, and he received his religious education in the cities of Herat and Nishapur. When he achieved unusual successes in mystical teaching, he moved to Khorezm. There he became one of nearest followers of very popular sheikh – Najm ad-Din Kubra. Afterwards, according to the prominent poet Abdurahman Djami Boharsi (15th century), Sheikh Saif ed-Din went to Bukhara as a tutor. In Bukhara he was honored with the title of "Sheikh al-Alam" ("sheikh of peace").

Unlike his teacher, Sayf al-Din Bakharzi safely survived the Mongol invasion. He lived around 40 years in Bukhara under new rulers. Moreover, he had incontestable authority over the ruling elite. For example, Berke Khan, who was the brother of Batu Khan, once visited sheikh al-Boharsi. Because of this meeting, the powerful Khan of the Kipchak or Golden Horde adopted Islam.

The mausoleum dedicated to him and Bayan-Quli Khan was built in the settlement called Fathabad, to the east of medieval Bukhara.

== See also ==
- Saif ed-Din Bokharzi & Bayan-Quli Khan Mausoleums
- Mir Sayyid Ali Hamadani
