= Sheihantaur =

Architectural monument in Tashkent, Uzbekistan

Coordinates: 41.3228°N 69.2589°E

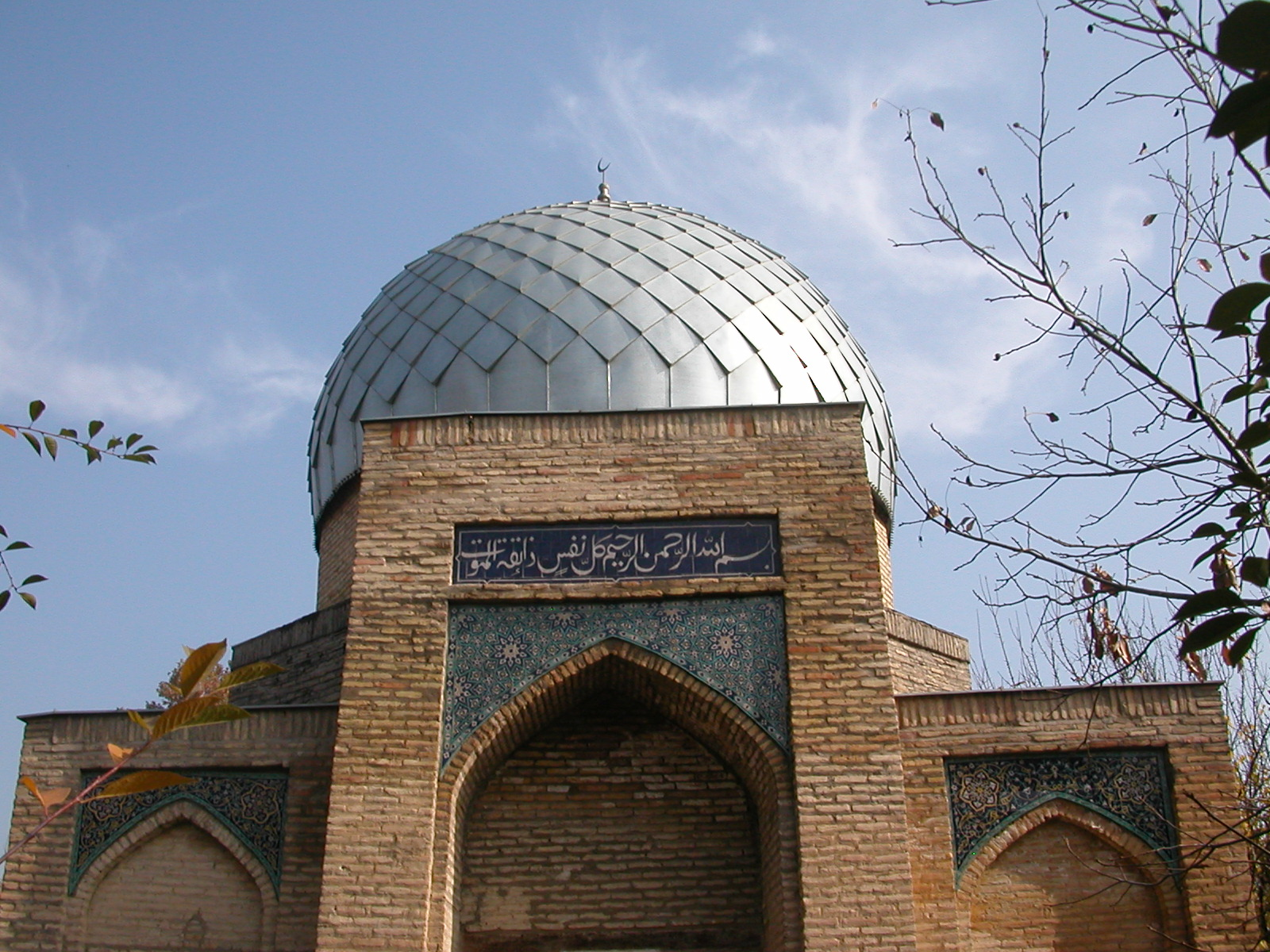
The Mausoleum of Sheihantaur was erected in the 14th century.

Sheihantaur (Uzbek: Shayxontohur) is a historic mausoleum complex in Tashkent, Uzbekistan. It is the burial site of Sheikh Hovendi at-Tahur, a local Sufi figure of historical significance.

== Hovendi at-Tahur ==
Sheikh Hovendi at-Tahur (Sheihantaur) was born in the late 13th century in Bogʻiston near Charvak Lake in the Tashkent Province of Uzbekistan. He was a sayyid, meaning he claimed descent from the Quraish, a tribe associated with Muhammad and believed to be a descendant of the Rashidun Caliph Umar and Umar ibn al-Khattab. He died in Tashkent around 1360; his tomb is contemporary, though heavily restored.

== The build of mausoleum of Sheihantaur ==
Example of a live saur in Bogʻiston village.

The mazar (mausoleum) of Sheihantaur was erected in the 14th century, but its outward appearance has undergone repeated changes over the years. The mausoleum is a small, brick-built structure with dark blue majolica tiles and a tall dome. Metal sheeting protects the Sheikhantaur's brick dome, restored in the 19th century, from weather and pollution, while an ancient tree trunk seems to sprout from the interior.

== Sheihantaur burial complex ==
The mausoleum is surrounded by a burial complex to which the saint has given his name. Several prominent figures from Tashkent's history are buried here. Such individuals include Yunus Khoja.

In addition to the mausoleum of Shaihantaur, the mausoleum of Qaldirghochbiy can be found here.

== See also ==
- Gates of Tashkent
- Tourism in Uzbekistan
- Sheikh Hovendi at-Tahur Complex
