= Saif ed-Din Bokharzi & Bayan-Quli Khan Mausoleums =

Mausoleum in Uzbekistan

Coordinates: 39.7666°N 64.4447°E

Two domes of Saif ed-Din Boharsi Mausoleum organize building's side-view.

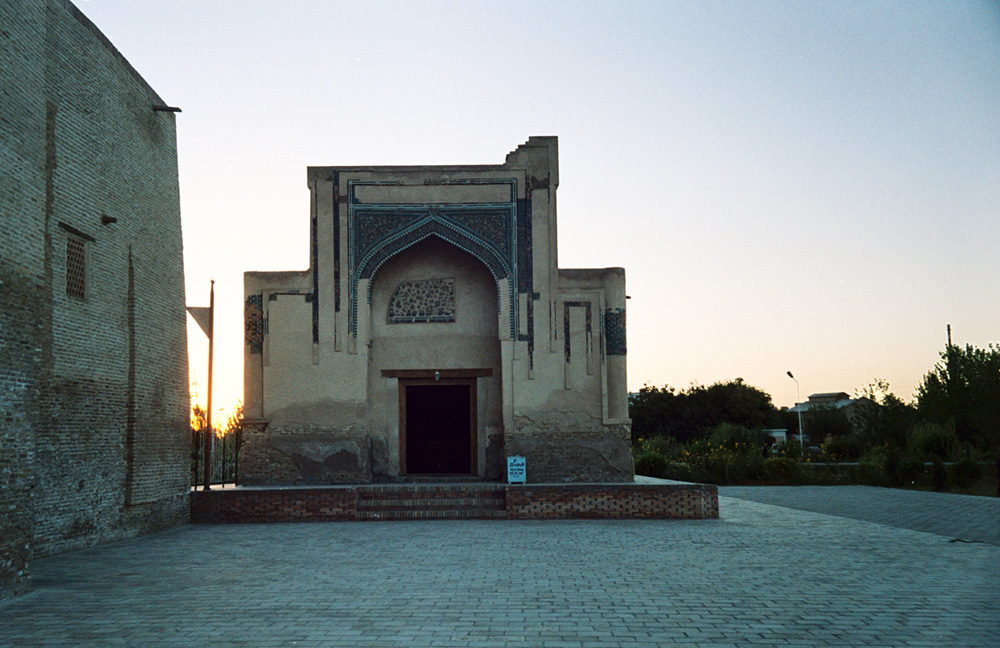
Bayan-Quli Khan Mausoleum.

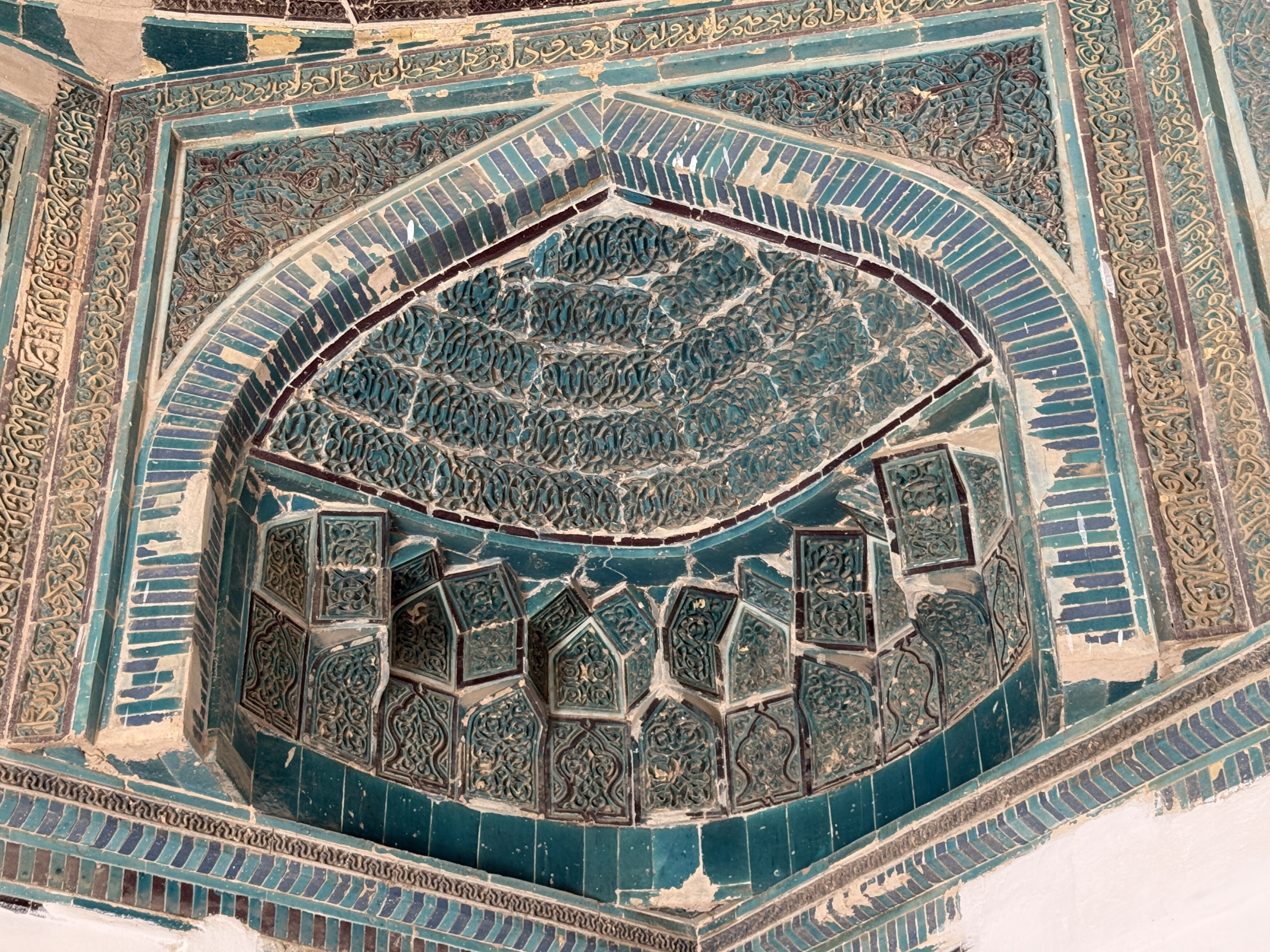
Bayan Quli Khan Mausoleum tilework, Bukhara

The Saif ed-Din Bokharzi & Bayan-Quli Khan Mausoleums are two mausoleums in Uzbekistan dedicated to Saif ed-Din Bokharzi, a Khorasani sheikh, and Bayan-Quli Khan, the Chagatay ruler. They are located in Fathabad, to the east of medieval Bukhara, the former location of a vast religious complex. The initial core of the complex was the grave of Saif ed-Din al-Boharsi, who died in 1261 (or possibly 1262). His followers built several dormitories (khanakas) for dervishes, who lived there on donations of the Kubrawiya Sufi order members. The mausoleum of Saif ed-Din Boharsi dates from the end of the 14th century. The Chagatay ruler Bayan-Quli Khan was interred near the burial place of al-Boharsi according to his wishes, and the Mausoleum of Bayan-Quli Khan appeared there in 1358.

== See also ==
- Samanid mausoleum
- Lyab-i Khauz
- Mausoleum of Sheikh Zaynudin
- Po-i-Kalyan
- Tourism in Uzbekistan
