= Gates of Tashkent =

Historical gates of the city of Tashkent, Uzbekistan

The Gates of Tashkent, in present-day Uzbekistan, were built around the town at the close of the 10th century, but they did not survive to the present day. The last gate was destroyed in 1890 as a result of the growth of the city, but some of the districts in Tashkent still bear the names of these gates.

== History and architecture ==
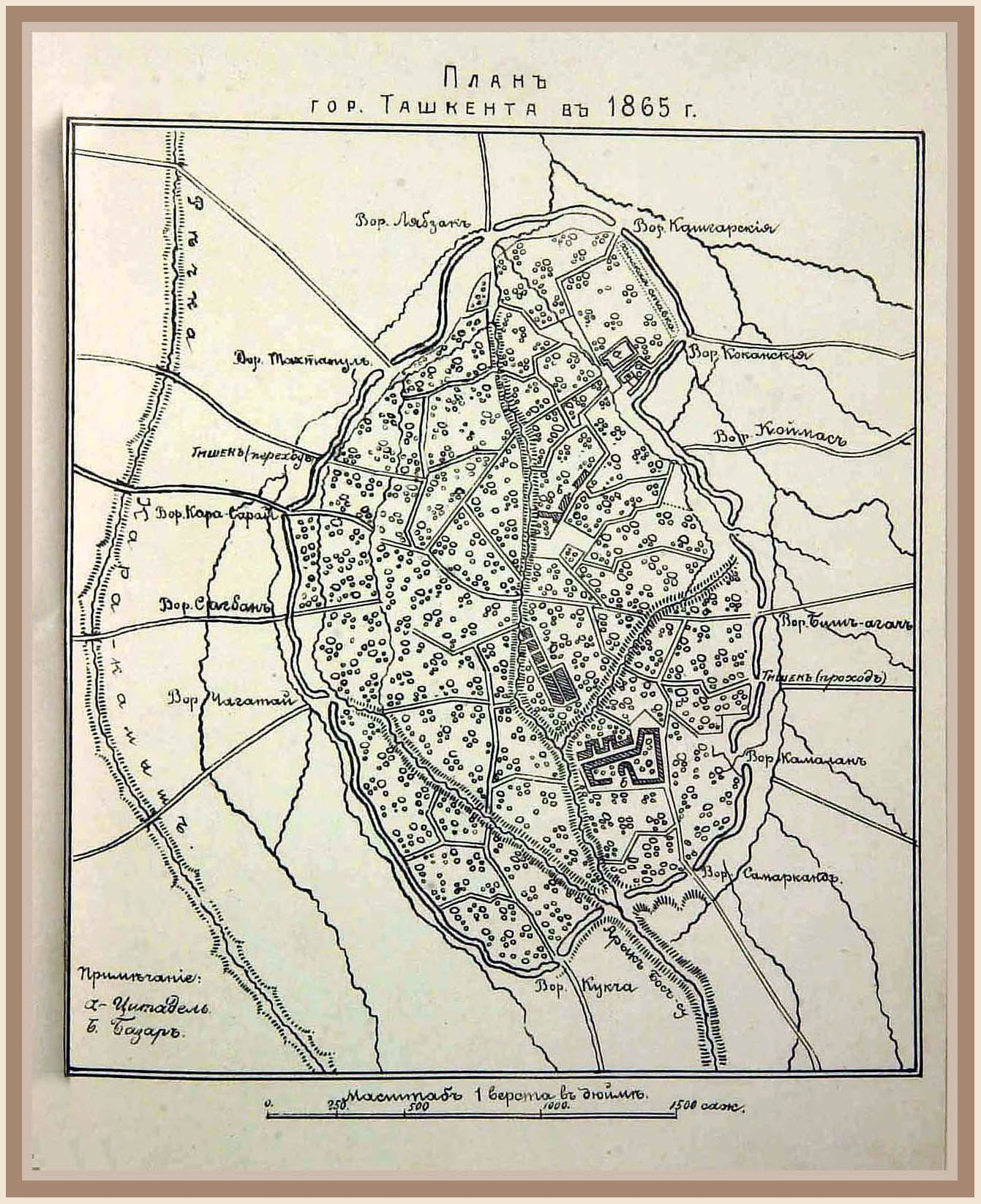
An early map of Tashkent from 1865, showing the walls and gates

The gates formed part of the city fortifications, which had been constructed around the new settlement on the banks of the Bozsuv canal (the canal starts from the right bank of the Chirchik river) at the intersection of caravan routes from the Tien Shan Mountains. The number of gates varied over time. Fifteenth-century sources mention that the gates were named after local tribes, as each tribe was put in charge of guarding a specific gate.

In the mid-19th century, the city wall was rebuilt by the Kokand governor (bekliyarbek). There were twelve gates:

1. Labzak
2. Takhtapul
3. Karasaray
4. Sagban
5. Chagatay
6. Kukcha
7. Samarkand
8. Kamalan
9. Beshagach
10. Koymas
11. Kokand
12. Kashgar.

Some of the gates were named after the cities they led to (e.g. Samarkand darvaza means Samarkand gate, as it was located at the beginning of the road to Samarkand).

Other gates were given the names of the main streets inside the city (e.g., Chagatay darvaza). The gates were made of spruce wood and framed with artistically wrought iron. Each gate had a gatehouse for a tax-collector (zakatchi) and security guard (darvazabon). The gates were open from daybreak till sunset. At nighttime the gates were locked and guarded by darvazabons.

In June 1865 Russian troops successfully stormed Tashkent. General Mikhail Grigorevich Cherniaev had only 3,000 men under his command against a city with a 25-kilometer-long wall, 12 gates and 30,000 defenders. The Russians captured the city after two days of fighting and the loss of only 25 dead. The local nobility and inhabitants of Tashkent felt little loyalty towards the authority of the Kokand khanate, therefore they preferred to surrender the town to Russians.

=== The Story of the Twelve Keys ===
On June 30, 1865 the representatives of the Tashkent nobility brought 12 gold keys from the gates of Tashkent to the Russian camp near Chimgan, a military village in the hills about 56 miles to the northeast of Tashkent. It was a sign of recognition of the victory of the Russian army.

After 1867 the army camp at Chimgan became an acclimatization station for military newcomers from Russia. During the Soviet period it was rebuilt to adapt its premises for use as a summer camp for children (now a recreation camp where campers still live at former military casernes). The surrounding area is still referred to as the "Twelve-Keys".

The keys were delivered to Saint Petersburg, where they were kept at the Suvorov Military Museum. In 1933 they were returned to Tashkent. One can see one of the keys at the History Museum. Others are stored at the National Bank. Each of the keys has an inscription engraved with the name of a particular gate and the date when a key was made.

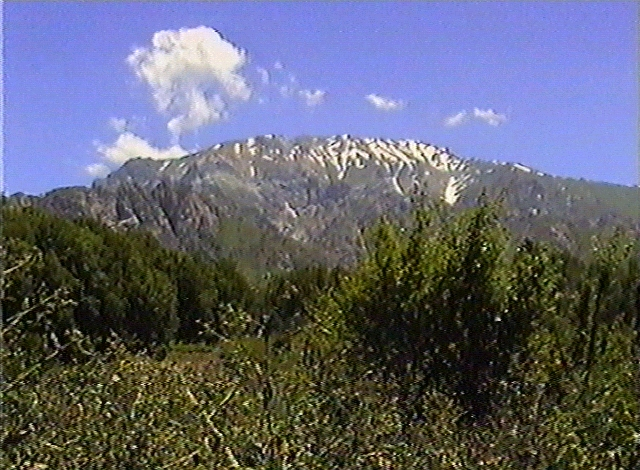
Prospect over Chimgan Peak from the place near old casernes
