= PGI Management =

International ski operation management company

Pas Grau International
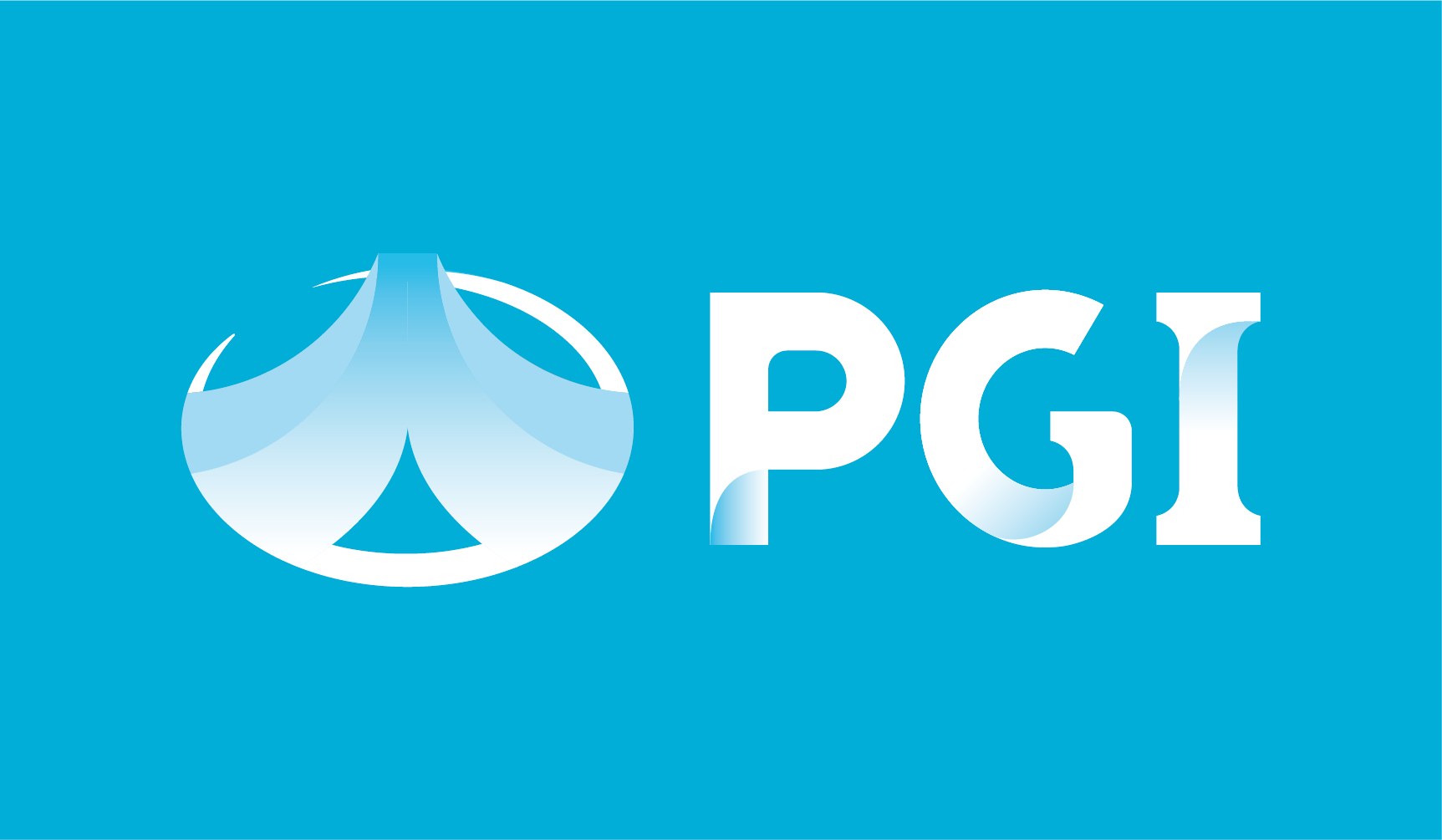
- Type: Andorra private company
- Industry: Professional services
- Founded: Andorra, (1957)
- Founder: Francesc Viladomat
- Headquarters: Prat de la Creu 59-65 5th Floor, Andorra la Vella, Andorra
- Area served: Worldwide
- Key people: Joan Viladomat (President)
- Services: Ski area operation Mountain business development Sales & Marketing; Support services
- Website: pgi.ad

Pas Grau Internacional, formerly PGI Management is an Andorra-based, international ski operation management company. Pas Grau Internacional is the international branch of SAETDE/Grandvalira.

== History ==
Pas Grau International (also known as PGI Management) began on 1 December 1957, with the official opening of the first ski lift in Pas de la Casa, in Andorra, near the border with France. The previous summer, PGI's founder Francesc Viladomat had begun to work on establishing the company Teleesquís Viladomat.

From 1957 to 1967, the ski resort growth created by Mr. Viladomat was incorporating state-of-the art facilities in Pas de la Casa. On 22 November 1967, SAETDE (Societat Anònima d’Equipament Turístic-Esportiu de la Parròquia d’Emcamp) was incorporated and began to run two ski lifts, Escola and Font Negre. On August 14, Francesc Viladomat and the Comú of Encamp signed an agreement to merge the two firms.

From 1967 to 2004, Pas de la Casa's Grau Roig developed more new facilities, including detachable 6-seat chair lifts, Funicamp (a 6.137 metre cable car), restaurants, FIS Stadium etc., converting the ski resort into one of the biggest in the Pyrenees.

In October 2003, the new skiing domain of Grandvalira became public as result of a commercial merger between Pas de la Casa-Grau Roig and Soldeu-el Tarter.

In 2005, Joan Viladomat founded Pas Grau International to promote, advise on, and manage, ski and mountain projects. With Pas Grau International, Grandvalira/SAETDE leverages all knowledge acquired over 50 years.

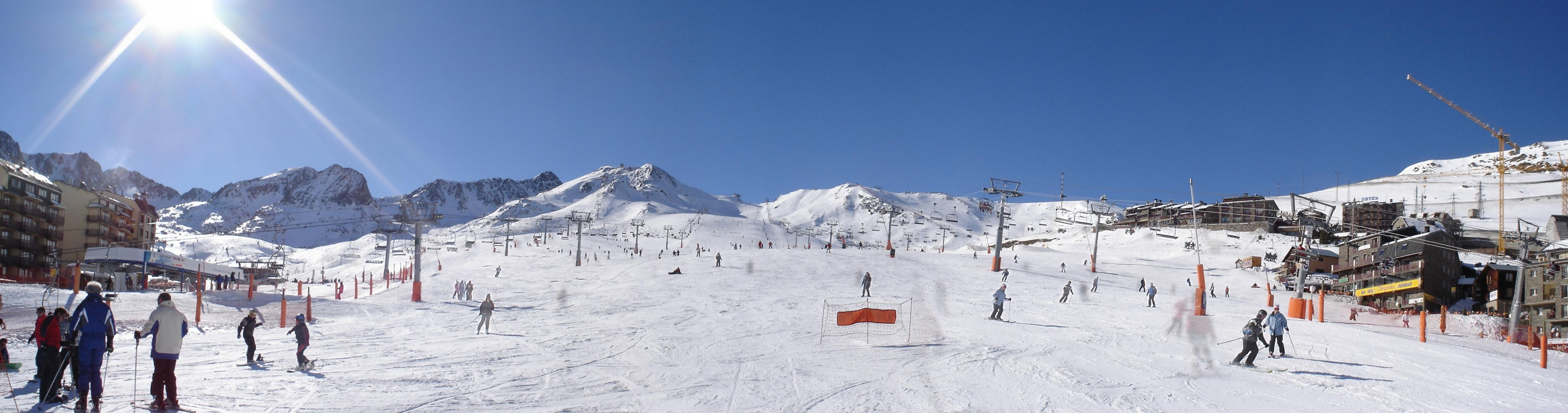
Grandvalira: Pas de la Casa Sector

== Services ==
Services of Pas Grau Internacional run the gamut, from the design of the ski domain to its completion and management.

Among its services are identifying business opportunities, the selection and coordination of suppliers, and cost analysis and investment efficiency. Development Services are Business Strategy, Process Analysis and Redesign, Benchmarking, Market intelligence, and Innovation.

Operation and management services include: Ski area Operations (lifts, slopes, snow grooming and snow making), Mountain Business Development (ski school, food & beverage, winter and summer activities and shops & rental), Sales & Marketing (positioning, pricing, sales operations and booking center), Support Services (IT, finance & administration, human resources and shared services).

== Main projects ==
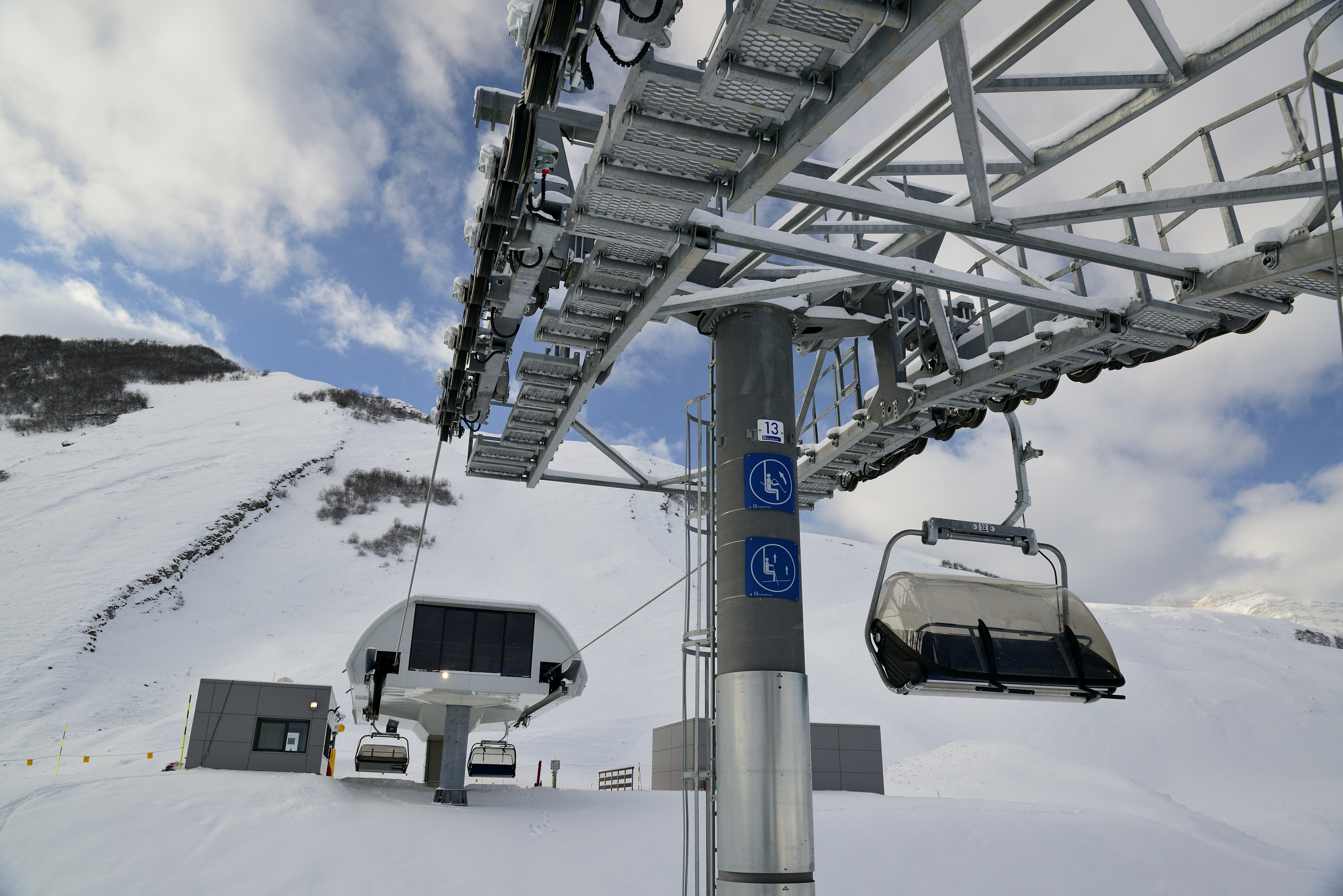
Ski Lift Working in Shahdag

Currently, Pas Grau International supports and operates Shahdag Mountain Resort (Azerbaijan), and has operated in the past GrandErzurum: Palandöken & Konakli (Erzurum-Turkey), Gavarnie-Gedre (France), Hautacam (France), Calafate Mountain Park (Argentina) and Shymbulak (Almaty-Kazakhstan)

Also Pas Grau Internacional was part of an international consortium developing Kok Zhailau in Kazakhstan, and the Master Plan for the ski resort renewal and positioning in Bovec (Slovenia)

PGI was in charge of Ski Resort Operation Management for Erciyes (Kayseri - Turkey) and Mountain Operation for GranPallars (Catalan Pyrenees – Spain). One of its first projects was the Training agreement with Ski Himalayas Resort (Manali – India).
