= Chimgan =

Ski resort in Uzbekistan

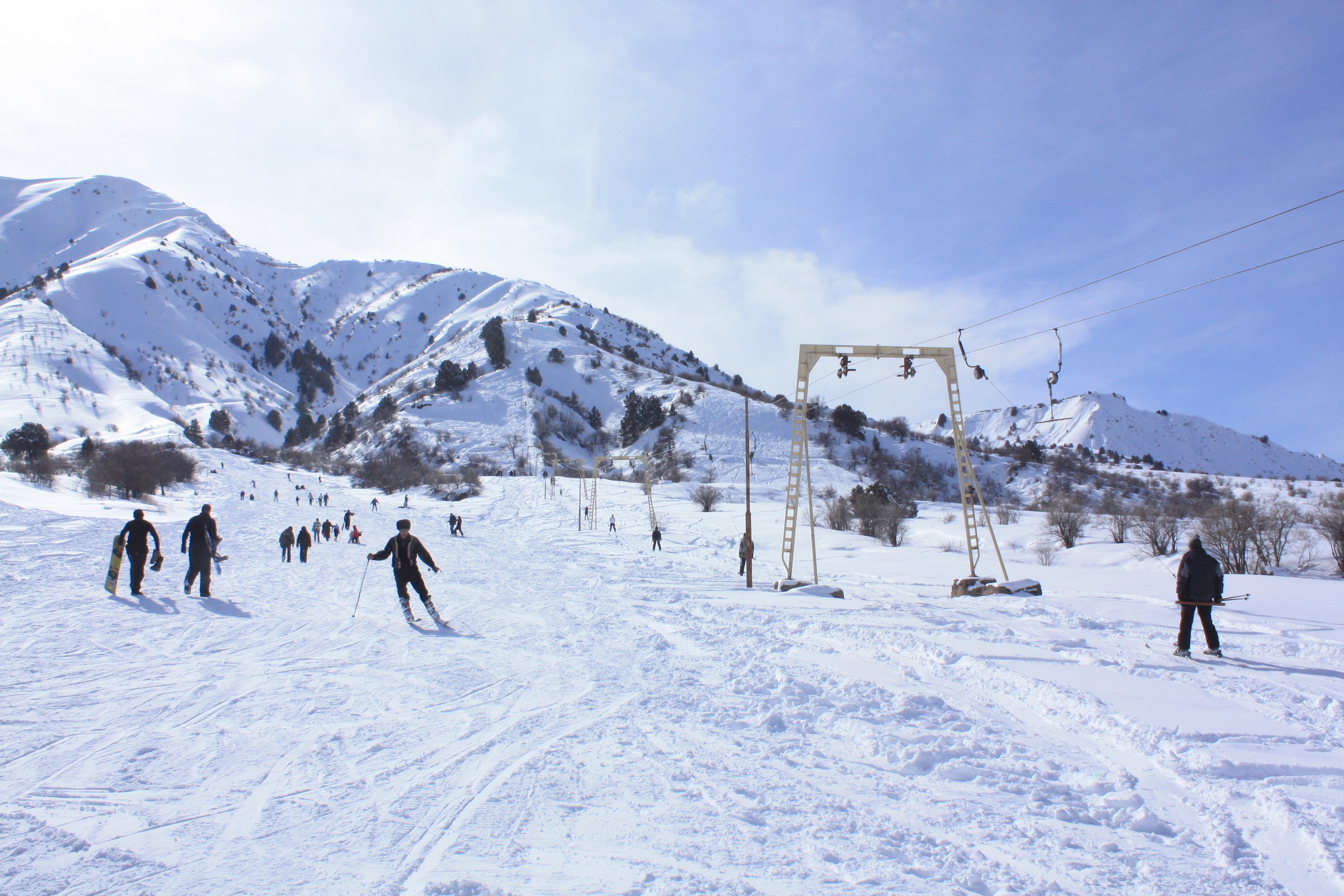
- Ski trail in Chimgan (2009)

- Location within Uzbekistan
- Location: Tian Shan, Uzbekistan
- Nearest city: Chirchiq
- Coordinates: 41°29′40″N 70°03′28″E
- Top elevation: 3,309 m (10,856 ft)

Chimgan or Chimgon (Uzbek: Chimyon/Chimgon; Kazakh: Шымған; Russian: Чимган) is a ski resort located in a mountain range named Tian Shan, near Chirchiq, Uzbekistan.

== Description ==
The tourist skiing complex Chimgan is located 85 km (52.8 mi) away from Tashkent, the capital of Uzbekistan, in the spurs of Chatkal Range on the height of 1,600 metres (5,249 ft), in the Western Tien Shan mountains, surrounding Tashkent from the East. There are hotel complexes and cottages in this ski center.

The main peak of the entire mountain area - Greater Chimgan (3,309 m - 10,856 ft) - looks like a peak of giant star from which, the rays of slopes, adorned by cliffy peaks disperse in all directions.

Rising higher than to 3,000 metres (9,842 ft) above the sea level, the Tien Shan mountains have the eternal blanket of snow that comes down to the mountain foot in winter.

The mountain skiing season starts in December and lasts until mid of March.

Chimgan is nicknamed "Uzbek Switzerland" because of its appearance and health-enhancing properties. Mountain slopes are surrounded by relic fir trees. Mountains and valleys, which people call "sai" are marked by mountain rivers. There are many flowers and herbs in their pure, fresh air (he word “Chimgan” or “Chim yon” is translated as “green grass”, “green valley”). The fresh and pure atmosphere is also present in the mood.

== Climate ==
Chimgan has a dry-summer humid continental climate (Köppen: Dsb), characterized by cold, snowy winters and warm, dry summers.

Climate data for Chimgan (1991–2020)
Month	Jan	Feb	Mar	Apr	May	Jun	Jul	Aug	Sep	Oct	Nov	Dec	Year
Mean daily maximum °C (°F)	1.2 (34.2)	2.3 (36.1)	7.3 (45.1)	13.5 (56.3)	18.3 (64.9)	23.3 (73.9)	26.2 (79.2)	25.7 (78.3)	21.1 (70.0)	14.4 (57.9)	7.9 (46.2)	3.0 (37.4)	13.7 (56.7)
Daily mean °C (°F)	−2.7 (27.1)	−1.9 (28.6)	2.8 (37.0)	8.8 (47.8)	13.6 (56.5)	18.2 (64.8)	21.0 (69.8)	20.3 (68.5)	15.5 (59.9)	9.3 (48.7)	3.5 (38.3)	−0.8 (30.6)	9.0 (48.2)
Mean daily minimum °C (°F)	−5.6 (21.9)	−5.3 (22.5)	−0.6 (30.9)	5.0 (41.0)	9.5 (49.1)	13.8 (56.8)	16.5 (61.7)	15.7 (60.3)	11.3 (52.3)	5.6 (42.1)	0.4 (32.7)	−3.7 (25.3)	5.2 (41.4)
Average precipitation mm (inches)	83.5 (3.29)	112.6 (4.43)	125.3 (4.93)	142.9 (5.63)	119.5 (4.70)	44.8 (1.76)	19.6 (0.77)	12.7 (0.50)	17.0 (0.67)	66.6 (2.62)	113.0 (4.45)	99.4 (3.91)	956.9 (37.67)
Average precipitation days (≥ 1.0 mm)	14	14	15	13	12	8	4	3	3	8	11	13	118
Source: NOAA

== Gallery ==
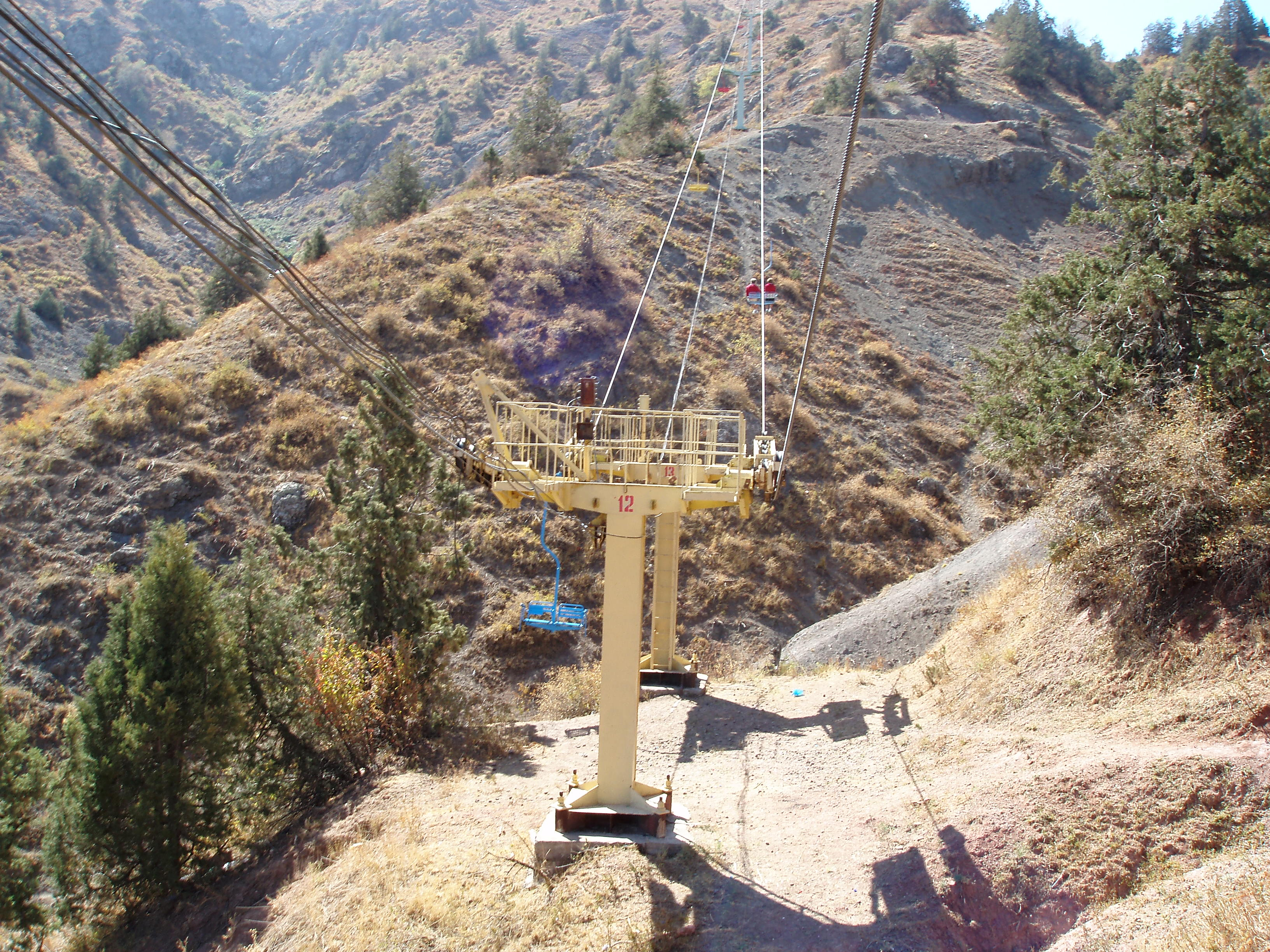
Chairlift in Beldersoy, Chimgan, in summer

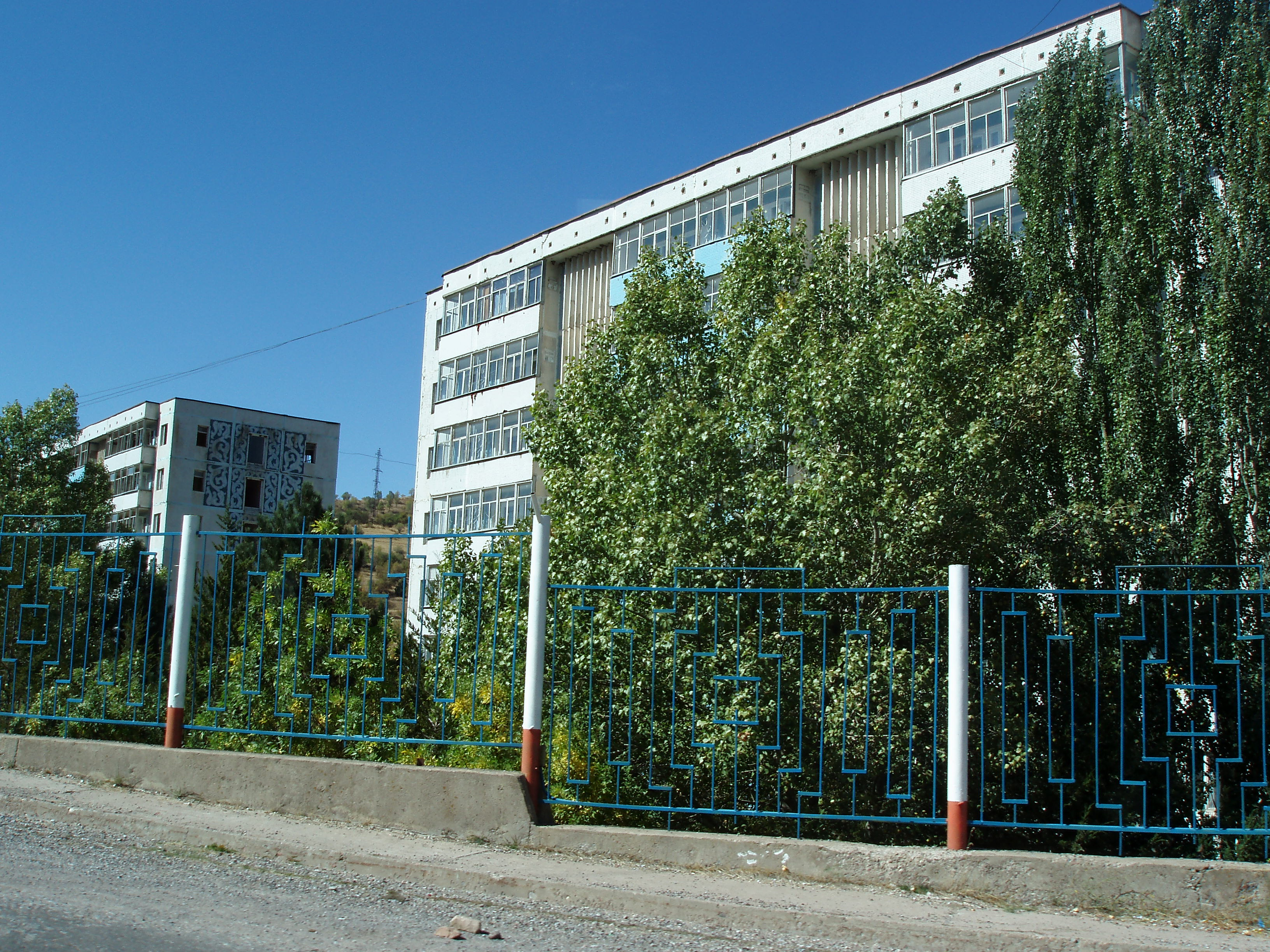
Soviet hotel in Chimgan

== Sources ==
- (in English) Mountain resort Chimgan: Skiing and snowboarding in Uzbekistan, Orexca.com
