= List of mountains of Uzbekistan =

This is a list of mountains and mountain ranges in Uzbekistan

== Mountains ==
Name	Elevation	Prominence	Mountain Range
Alpomish	4,668 metres (15,315 ft)	854 metres (2,802 ft)	Hisar Range
Khazret Sultan	4,643 metres (15,233 ft)	564 metres (1,850 ft)	Hisar Range
Mount Adelung	4,301 metres (14,111 ft)		Hisar Range
Mount Beshtor	4,299 metres (14,104 ft)		Pskem Mountains
Greater Chimgan	3,309 metres (10,856 ft)	1,689 metres (5,541 ft)	Chatkal Range
Ayribobo	3,138 metres (10,295 ft)	1,639 metres (5,377 ft)	Köýtendag Range

== Mountain Ranges ==
- Hisar Range
- Pskem Range
- Zarafshan Range
- Talas Ala-Too Range
- Chatkal Range
- Ugam Range
- Turkestan Range
- Fann Mountains
