= Chatkal District =

Coordinates: 41°45′N 71°04′E

Chatkal Чаткал району
- District
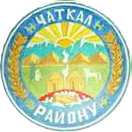
- Flag Coat of arms

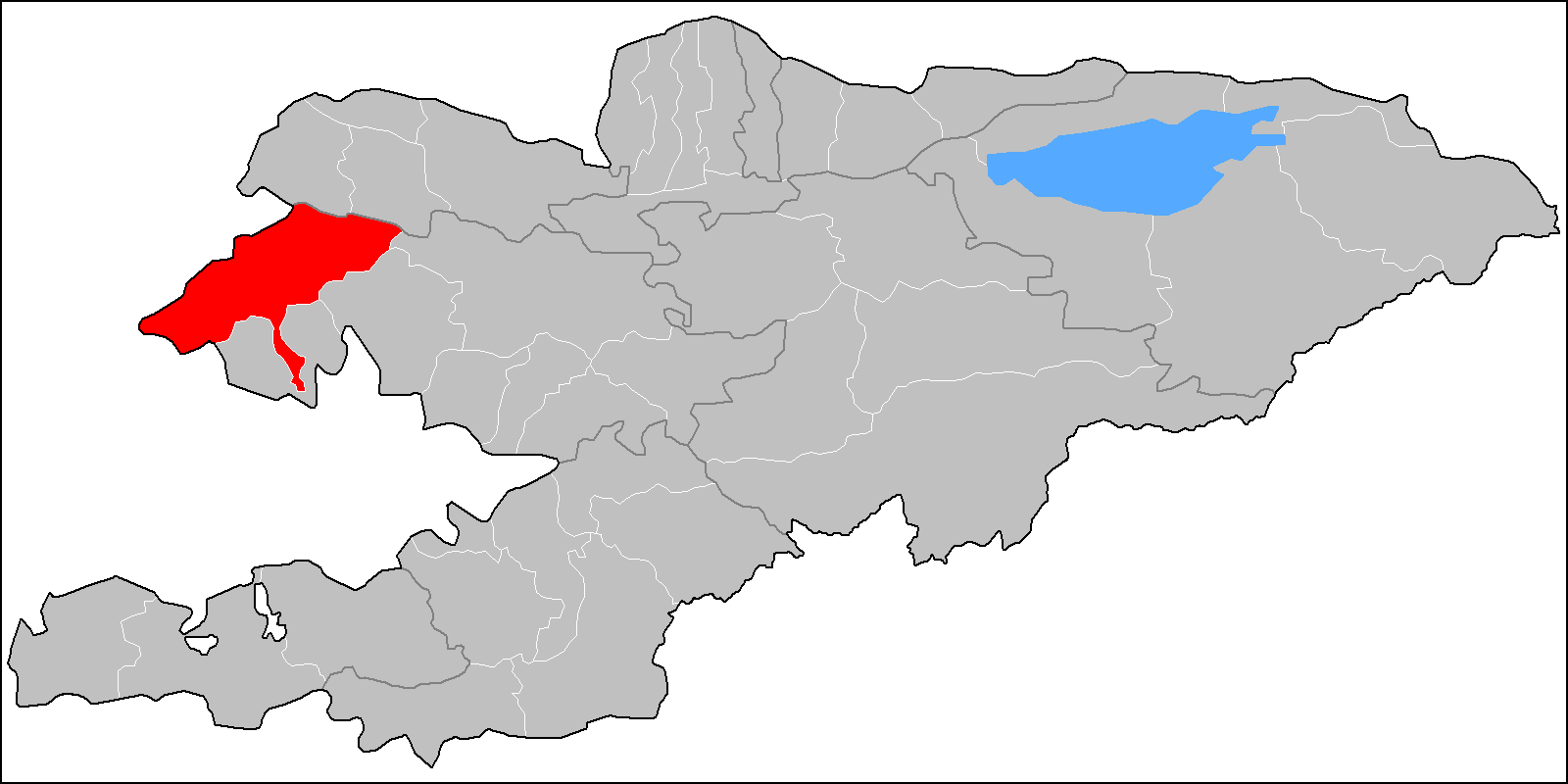
- Country: Kyrgyzstan
- Region: Jalal-Abad Region

Area
  - Total: 4,608 km^{2} (1,779 sq mi)

Population (2021)
  - Total: 28,625
  - Density: 6.212/km^{2} (16.09/sq mi)
- Time zone: UTC+6

Chatkal (Kyrgyz: Чаткал району) is a district of Jalal-Abad Region in western Kyrgyzstan. The administrative seat lies at Kanysh-Kyya. Its area is 4,608 square kilometres (1,779 sq mi), and its resident population was 28,625 in 2021.

== Geography ==
The district occupies high-altitude Chatkal valley limited by Talas Ala-Too from north, Pskem Range from north-west and west, and Chatkal Range from south-east. In addition, the district includes a small area of south-east slope of the Chatkal Range facing Fergana Valley. Elevations of the terrain range from approximately 1500 m at Sumsar to 4503 m in the Chatkal range. Some other picks of the district reach altitudes of over 4000 meters. Chatkal valley is pear-shaped. The slope of Chatkal Range facing the valley is terraced. The terraces are dissected by deep canyons of Chatkal river's tributaries, characterized by snowfields and small glaciers in the upstreams. Chandalash Range extends in the central part of the district. Mountains occupy 96%, and vallies - 4% of the district.

The hydrology is dominated by Chatkal river with multiple tributaries: the largest ones are Chandalash (right) and Ters (left).

=== Climate ===
Climate data for Chatkal (1991–2020)
Month	Jan	Feb	Mar	Apr	May	Jun	Jul	Aug	Sep	Oct	Nov	Dec	Year
Daily mean °C (°F)	−13.0 (8.6)	−10.8 (12.6)	−4.3 (24.3)	4.3 (39.7)	10.8 (51.4)	14.2 (57.6)	17.0 (62.6)	16.8 (62.2)	12.1 (53.8)	5.1 (41.2)	−3.0 (26.6)	−10.4 (13.3)	3.2 (37.8)
Source: NOAA

== Population ==
Historical population
Year	Pop.	±% p.a.
1970	11,904	—
1979	13,994	+1.81%
1989	18,803	+3.00%
1999	19,603	+0.42%
2009	22,490	+1.38%
2021	28,625	+2.03%
Note: resident population; Sources:

== Rural communities and villages ==
In total, Chatkal District includes 22 settlements in 4 rural communities (ayyl aymagy). Each rural community can consist of one or several villages. The rural communities and settlements in the Chatkal District are:

1. Chatkal (seat: Jangy-Bazar; incl. Ak-Tash, Besh-Aral, Kurulush and Chandalash)
2. Kanysh-Kyya (seat: Kanysh-Kyya; incl. Aygyr-Jar, Bashky-Terek, Korgon-Say, Kyzyl-Tokoy, Chakmak-Suu, Jer-Kapchygay, Kayyng-Suu, Kara-Bulak and Kara-Suu)
3. Sumsar (seat: Sumsar; incl. Monchok-Döbö, Shekaftar and Birimdik)
4. Terek-Say (seat: Terek-Say; incl. Ak-Terek and Bolush)
Settlements of the Chatkal District.
