= Kanysh-Kiya Airport =

Kanysh-Kiya Airport Каныш-Кыя аэропорту
- IATA: none (КШЯ); ICAO: none

Summary
- Airport type: Public
- Operator: Government
- Serves: Kanysh-Kiya
- Location: Chatkal District, Jalal-Abad Province
- Elevation AMSL: 6,102 ft / 1,860 m
- Coordinates: 41°45′19″N 071°03′02″E

Map

Runways
Direction	Length		Surface
Direction	m	ft	Surface
	1,500	4,921	Asphalt

Kanysh-Kiya Airport (Kyrgyz: Каныш-Кыя аэропорту, Russian: Каныш-Кийский аэропорт (IATA: none (КШЯ))) is an airport outside Kanysh-Kiya, a village in Chatkal District of Jalal-Abad Province (oblast) of Kyrgyzstan. The Russian IATA code for Kanysh-Kiya Airport is КШЯ.

Kanysh-Kiya Airport started its operations in the 1970s to serve the transportation needs of the miners in Kanysh-Kiya as well as the nearby Terek-Say and Sumsar. The current runway was built in the 1970s. The airport has no terminal as such, and has no instrument landing facilities and operates only during daylight hours.

Kanysh-Kiya Airport is currently not in use. However, there are plans to renovate it. Kyrgyz Then-Prime Minister Jantörö Satybaldiyev in October 2012 said: "We should resume operations of the airport so that small planes would be able to fly here."
