= Tüz-Ashuu =

Location
- Country: Kyrgyzstan

Physical characteristics
- Mouth: Chatkal
  - coordinates: 41.724°N 70.917°E

Basin features
- Progression: Chatkal→ Chirchiq→ Syr Darya→ North Aral Sea

The Tüz-Ashuu (Kyrgyz: Түз-Ашуу) or Tüz-Ashuu-Say is a river in Jalal-Abad Region of Kyrgyzstan. It is a left tributary of the Chatkal. It flows into the Chatkal between Jangy-Bazar and Aygyr-Jar.
