= Mount Adelung =

Mountain in Uzbekistan

Adelung
- гора Аделунга, Adelunga Toghi
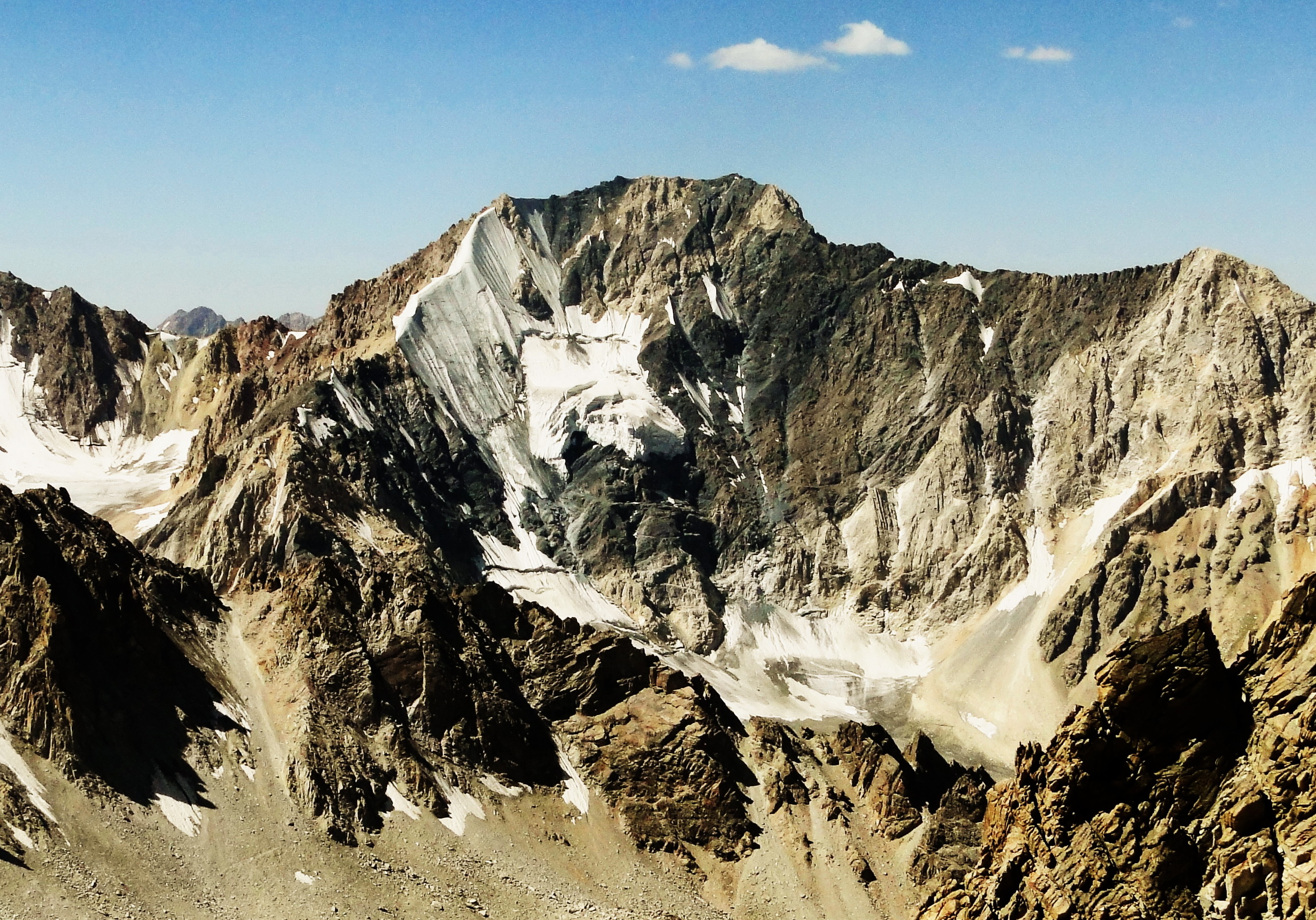

Highest point
- Elevation: 4,301 m (14,111 ft)
- Listing: Mountains of Uzbekistan
- Coordinates: 42°07′N 70°58′E

Geography
- Location within Uzbekistan
- Country: Uzbekistan
- Region: Tashkent
- Parent range: Pskem Mountains

Mount Adelung (Russian: Гора Аделунга) is the highest peak in Pskem Mountains (Russian: Пскемский хребет) in the extreme north-east of the Tashkent Region, Uzbekistan. Mount Adelung is the highest point of Tashkent Province at 4,301 m (14,111 ft), just 2 metres higher than the nearby Mount Beshtor, located a little further to the southwest in the same range, and it is often erroneously identified in various web sources as the "highest point in Uzbekistan". In fact, this honor goes to the Khazret Sultan, a peak with an altitude of 4,643 m in Surxondaryo Region, in the Uzbek part of the Gissar Range, on the border with Tajikistan, which was formerly known as Peak of the 22nd Congress of the Communist Party.
