= Greater Chimgan =

Mountain in Uzbekistan

Greater Chimgan Mountain
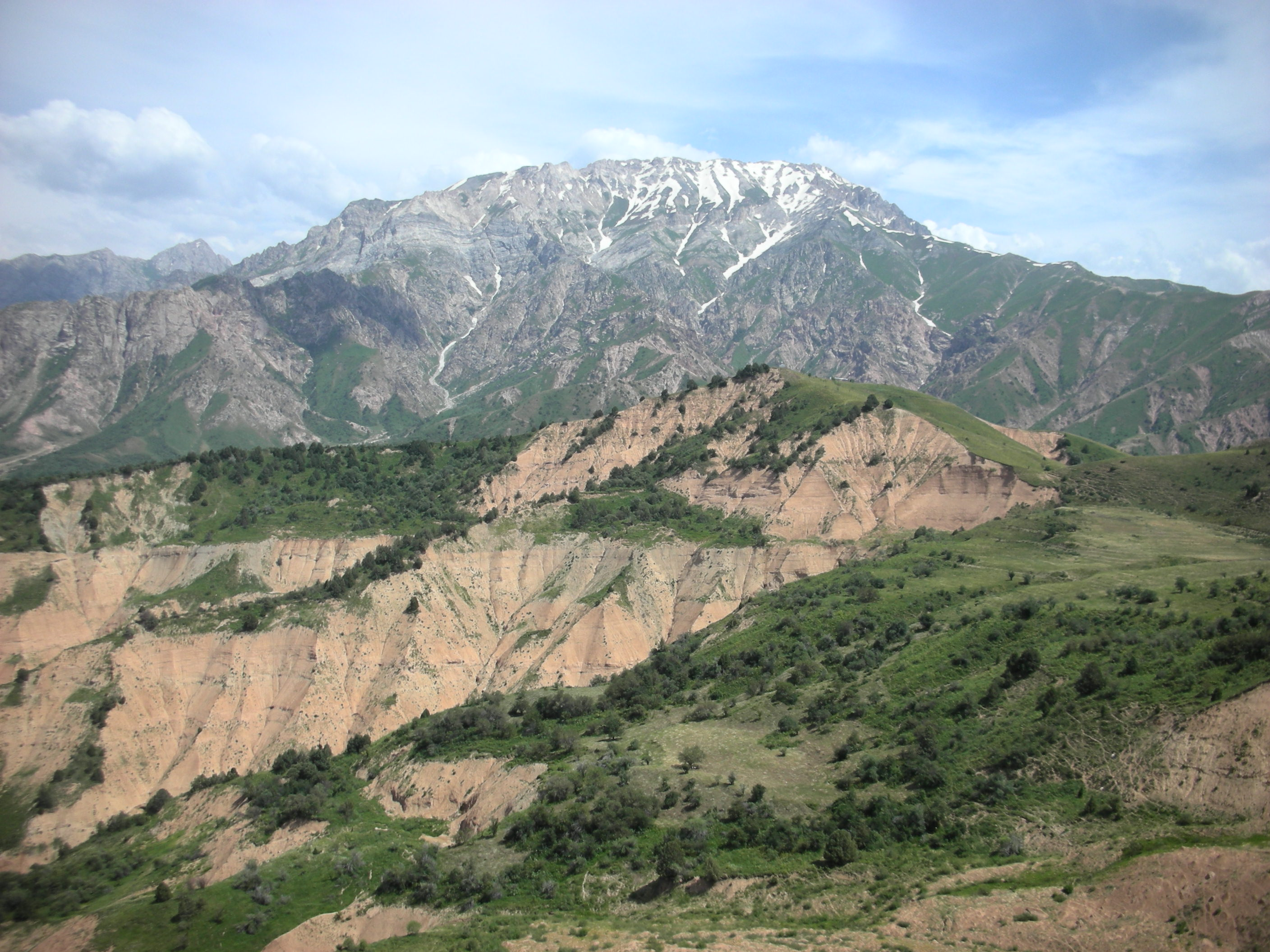
- The Greater Chimgan Mountain (Uzbekistan)

Highest point
- Elevation: 3,309 m (10,856 ft)
- Prominence: 1,689 m (5,541 ft)
- Listing: List of mountains of Uzbekistan; Ultra
- Coordinates: 41°29′40″N 70°03′28″E

Geography
- Location: Uzbekistan
- Parent range: Chatkal Range (West Tien-Shan)

Climbing
- First ascent: arguably 1909
- Easiest route: scrambling snow ice climb

Greater Chimgan (3,309 m) of the Chatkal Mountain range (the Western Tian Shan) is located in the territory of the Ugam-Chatkal National Park, and it is in the Bostanlyk administrative district (Tashkent Province), Uzbekistan.

Orographical scheme of the Greater Chimgan Mountain and surrounding area

The Chimgan village was settled 400–500 years ago in the mountain massive of dominant the Greater Chimgan peak (3,309 m), at an altitude of 1,620 m.

Some experts see Chinese words in the name "Chimgan" but others translate it as "sod" or "pasture abundant in water, green valley".

For generations of those, who live in Tashkent province, the Greater Chimgan is the place of romantic gravitation.

Greater Chimgan (3,309m) has been known to mountaineers since the beginning of the 20th century.

For those who want to experience of rock climbing, hiking and mountaineering Chimgan Highlands caters many opportunities. Chimgan Highlands have been a host for many other outdoor activities such as hang gliding, skiing, snowboarding and horseback riding.

For many years the Greater Chimgan was the first challenge for thousands beginners of Soviet mountaineering.

A great number of routes of several grades (from I/II to IV inclusively) allows a wide spectrum of mountaineering. Beginners at climbing usually take on the uncomplicated western ridge of the Greater Chimgan Mountain (I/II), while there are plenty of more complicated routes for experienced climbers.

== Climate and seasons ==
Climatic conditions in Chimgan are determined by the mountainous part of the Ugam-Chatkal National Nature Park. The climate is continental; there are seasonal and daily fluctuations. During the day it is warm, the evenings are cool. Spring comes in April in the mid-mountains; in the high mountains there is snow and cold until midsummer. The highest temperature is in June–July and early-August. Mean daily temperature of the warmest month (July) fluctuates from 20 to 35 degrees Celsius. Average annual precipitation is 650 mm. Heavy snowfall is in winter, which allows skiing and snowboarding. Snow cover lasts for 4–5 months. The frost period lasts about 130 days.

== Accessibility ==
Chimgan is located 60 km from Gazalkent regional centre and 40 km from Hojikent railway station. The closest airport having international and local importance is in Tashkent, 100 km away. A new expressway from Tashkent to Hojikent is paved with high-quality pavement; in some places there is artificial illumination. Chimgan is further reachable from Gazalkent by public bus (50 min). There are bus routes Chimgan-Gazalkent (time of departure is 6:30 and 13:30) and Gazalkent-Chimgan (10:30 and 14:30). Private cars including taxis can also be used to get there. The road is accessible any time of the year, but in spring there can be limitations because of landslides and mudflows. In winter avalanches make the route dangerous. Alternative means of transportation are helicopters (but their use is limited).

== Climbing routes ==
The most popular route among tourists is the Western Ridge route. The route starts in the Aksai gorge, or from the road nearby, and then along one of several buttresses there is a rather steep climb to the trail. After the initial climb, there follows an almost horizontal section of the path with minimal gradient. From a height of 2600-2700 meters the slope becomes steep; just above the 3000-meter mark there is a grotto with memorial plaques. Next to the grotto is the “gendarme” - a rocky area. the passage of which is only possible by traverse. In winter, the climb along the Central Couloir is popular; the route has a winter grade I/II. To complete the route, special equipment is required: crampons and ice axes. The simplest tourist routes (albeit requiring quite a bit of time) are the routes along the eastern ridge (entry from Gulkam, Mazarsay and the Komsomolets pass) and along the southern ridge (Beldersay - Kumbel pass - Takhta pass).

According to the (UIAA) Classifier of routes to mountain peaks, there are 15 categorical routes to the top of Greater Chimgan, in addition, 3 traverse routes passing through the top of Greater Chimgan.

Number	Route	Grade (UIAA)	Year of first ascent and name of group leader
1	Along the western ridge	I/II	May 1, 1949, Vitaly Nozdryukhin (Mountaineering Section at the Tashkent Telegraph)
2	From the north (“Central Couloir”)	I/II	1952, Albert Arzanov
3	On the left northern buttress of the western ridge	I/II	1981, Vladimir Mikhailovich Zhukov
4	On the northern buttress of the western ridge (“Zhukovka”)	II	1977, Vladimir Mikhailovich Zhukov
5	On the western buttress of the northern ridge (“Iron”)	II	1978, O. Kuzaeva
6	Along the southwestern ridge	II	1955, Vitaly Sats-Dmitruk
7	Along the northeastern ridge (“Chinese March”)	II/III	1953, Vitaly Nozdryukhin
8	Along the central part of the northern ridge (“Hare Ears”)	II/III	1952, Albert Arzanov
9	Along the central buttress of the northwestern part of the Kattakoksai wall	II/III	1997
10	On the western wall of the northern ridge	III	1978, T. Kudakaev
11	Along the northwestern wall	III	1978, Yuri Saratov
12	On the left buttress of the western wall	III	1978, L. Orlov
13	From the north-west of the Kattakosai Wall	III/IV	1979, Flyura Zhirnova
14	On the north-eastern wall	IV	1978, E. Ivanov
15	On the left buttress of the north-eastern wall	IV	1980, O. Murtazin

Traverse routes passing through the peak of Greater Chimgan

Number	Route	Grade (UIAA)	Year of first ascent and name of group leader
1	Greater Chimgan - Kichkina	II	
2	Greater Chimgan - Okhotnichiy	III	
3	Okhotnichiy - Greater Chimgan	III	2000

== Images from Chimgan ==
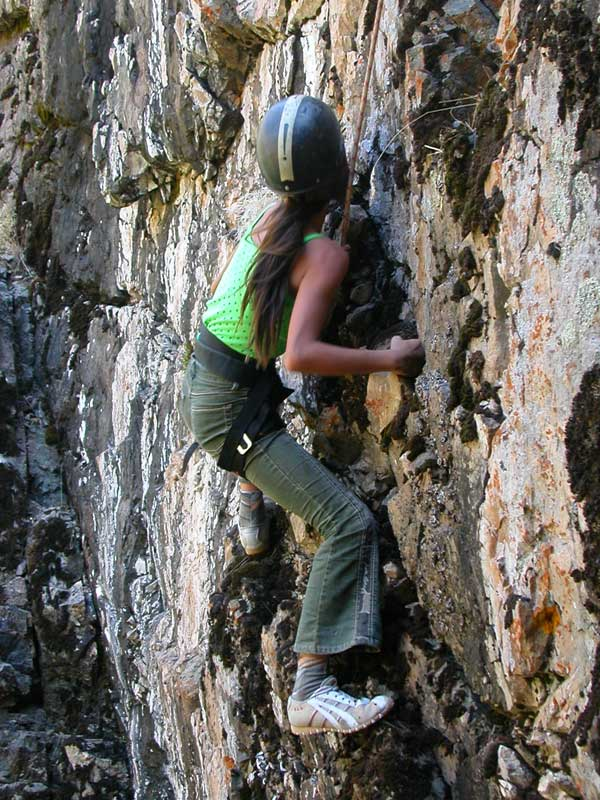

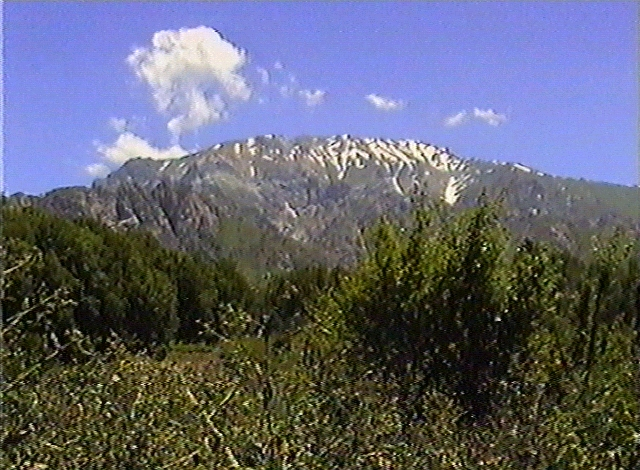

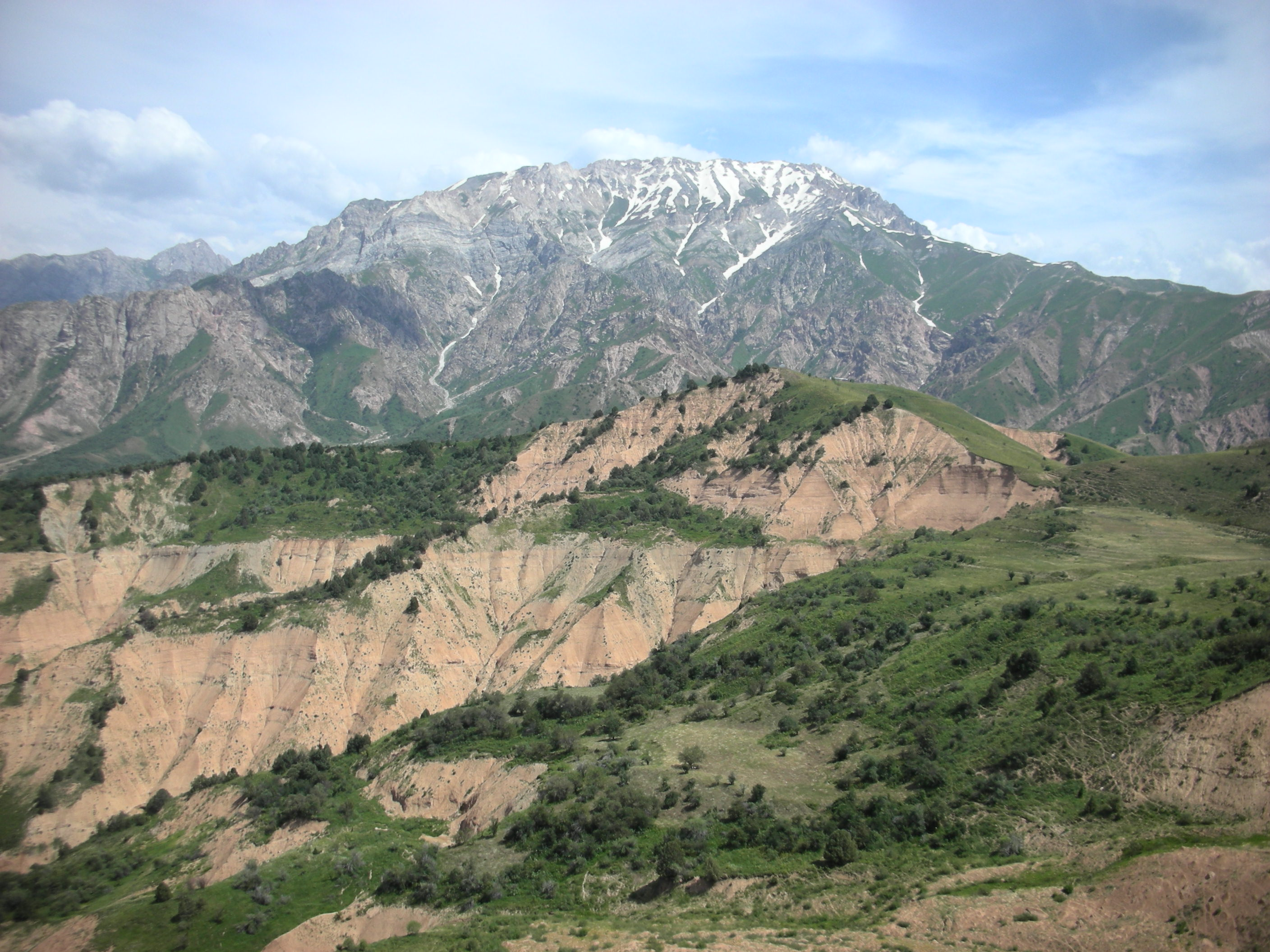

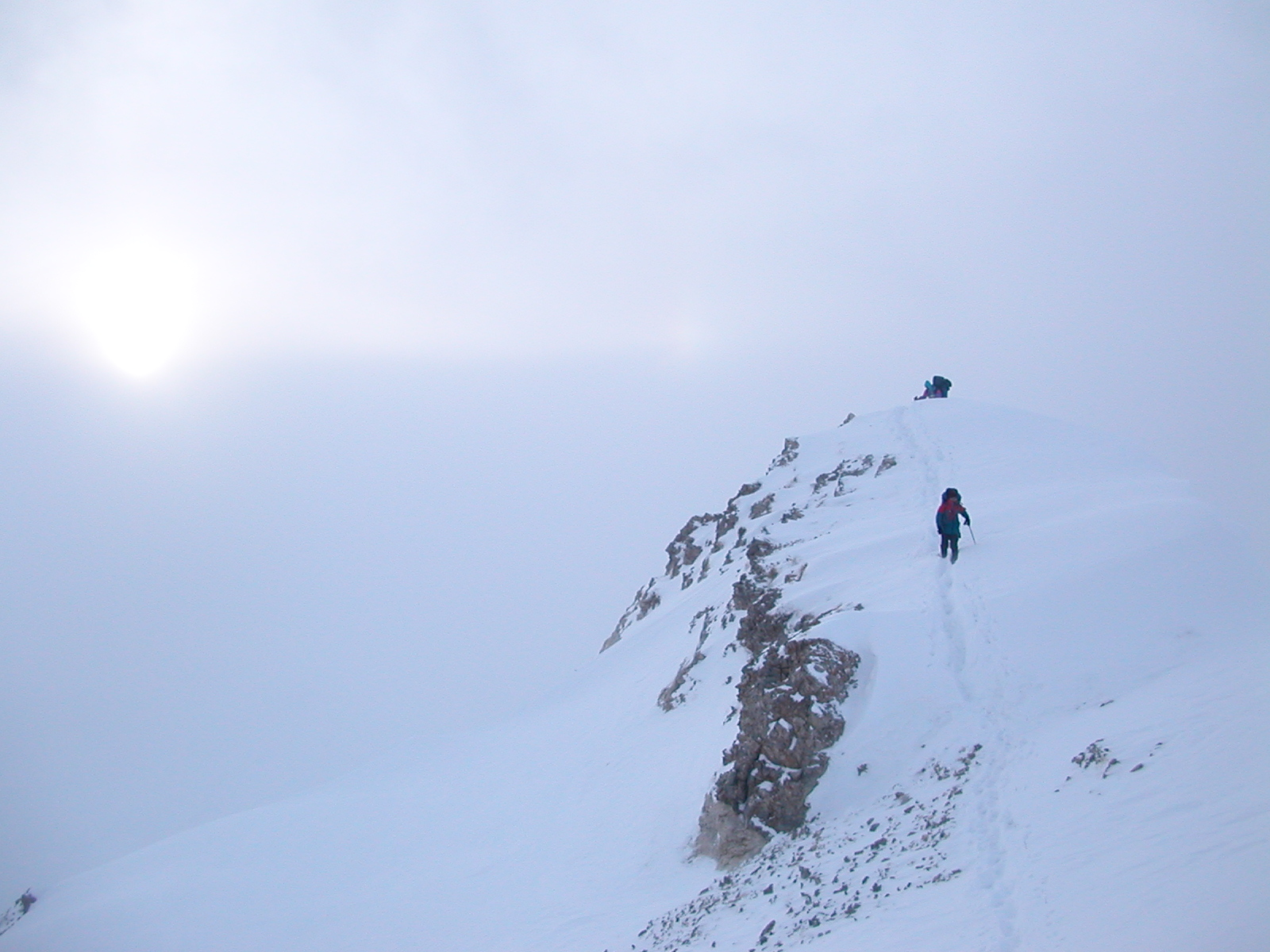

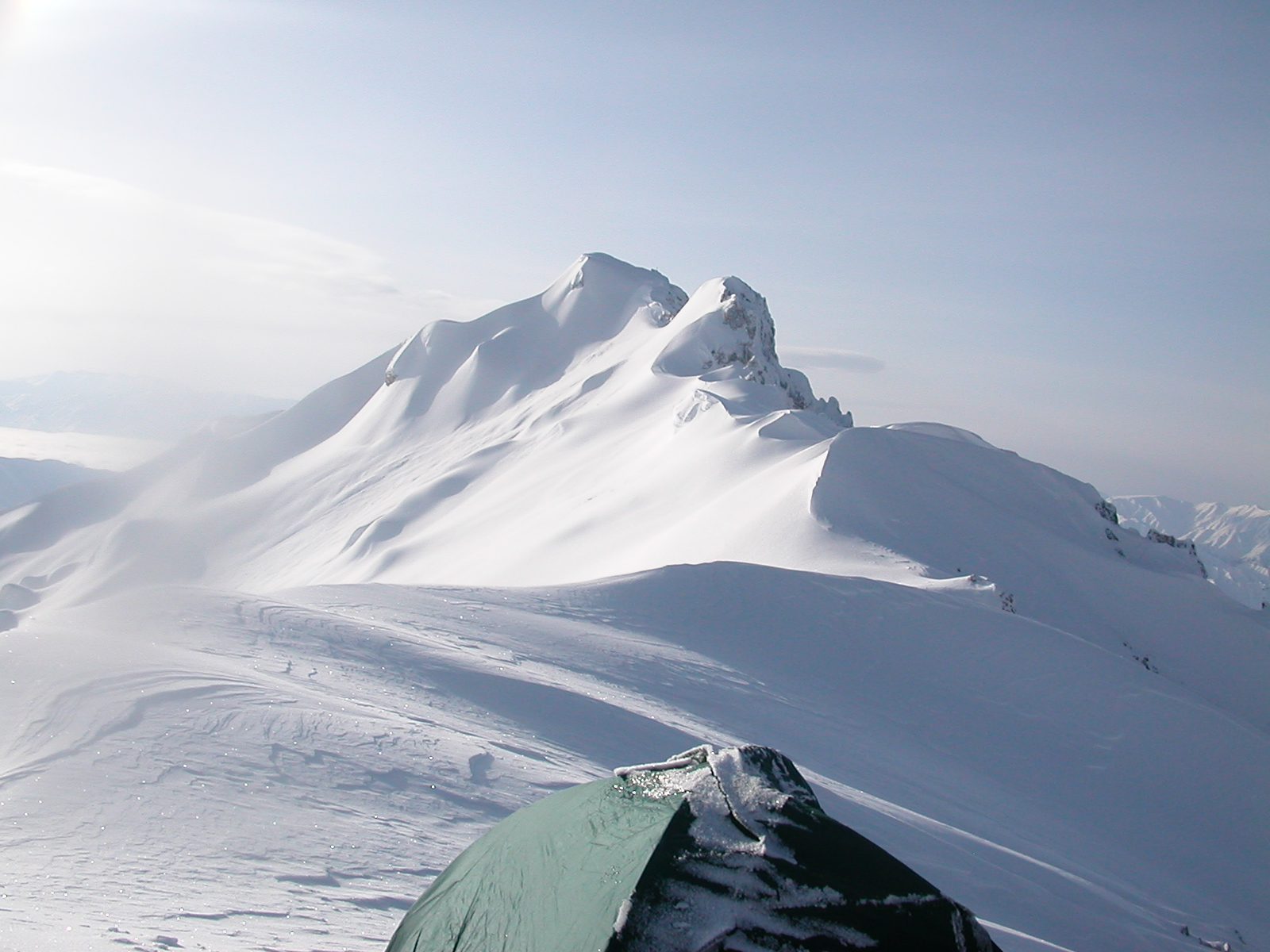

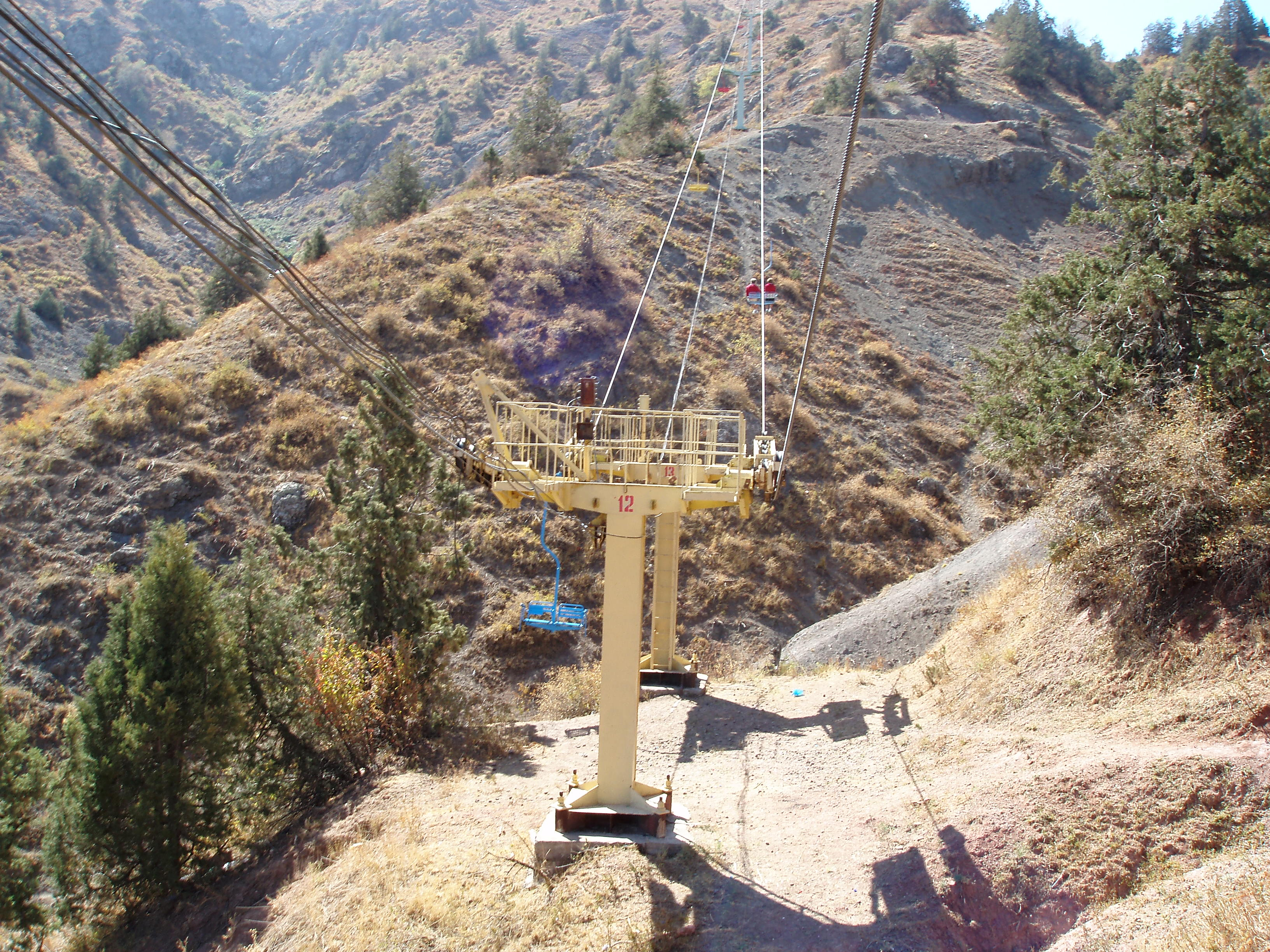

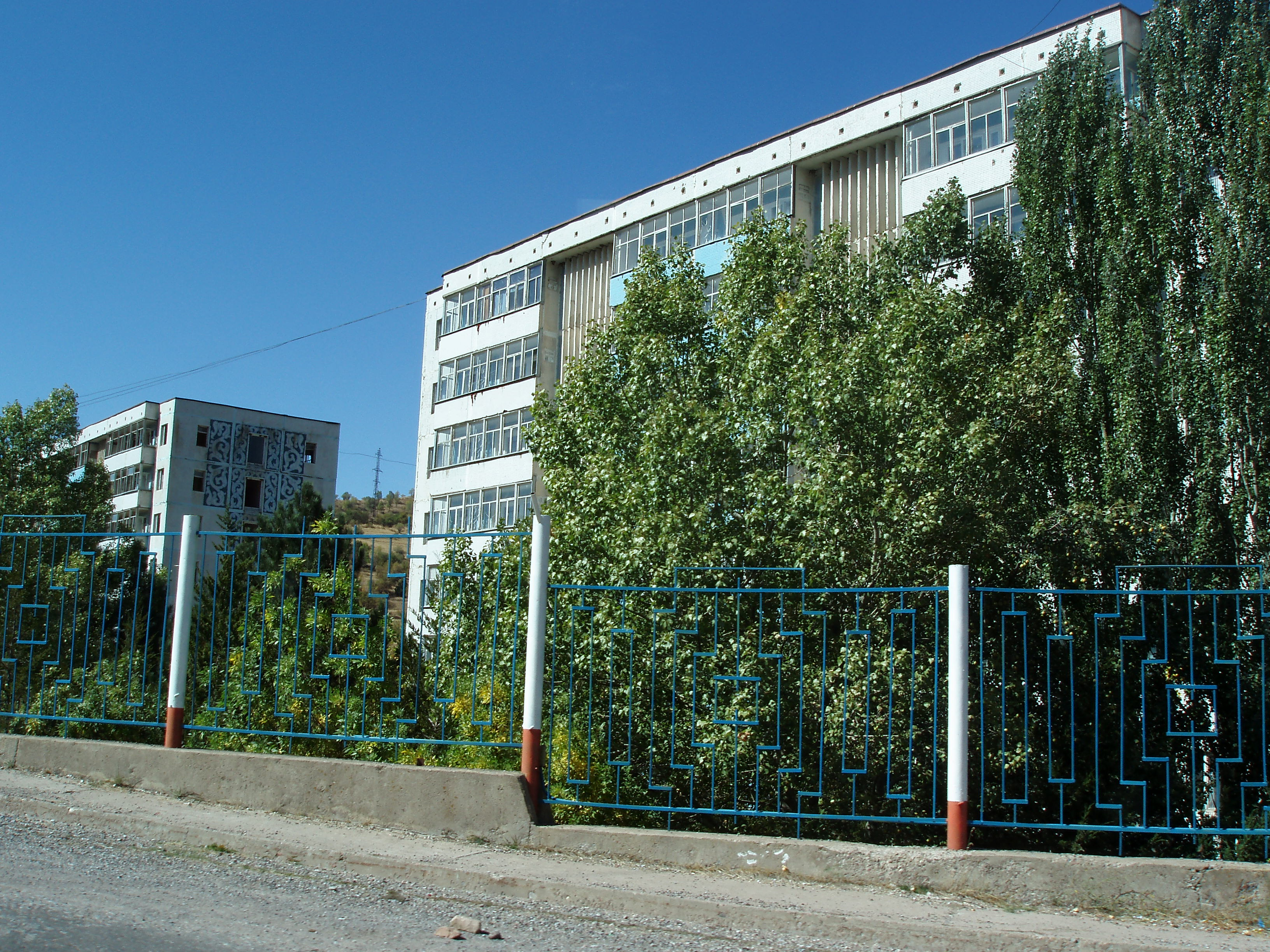

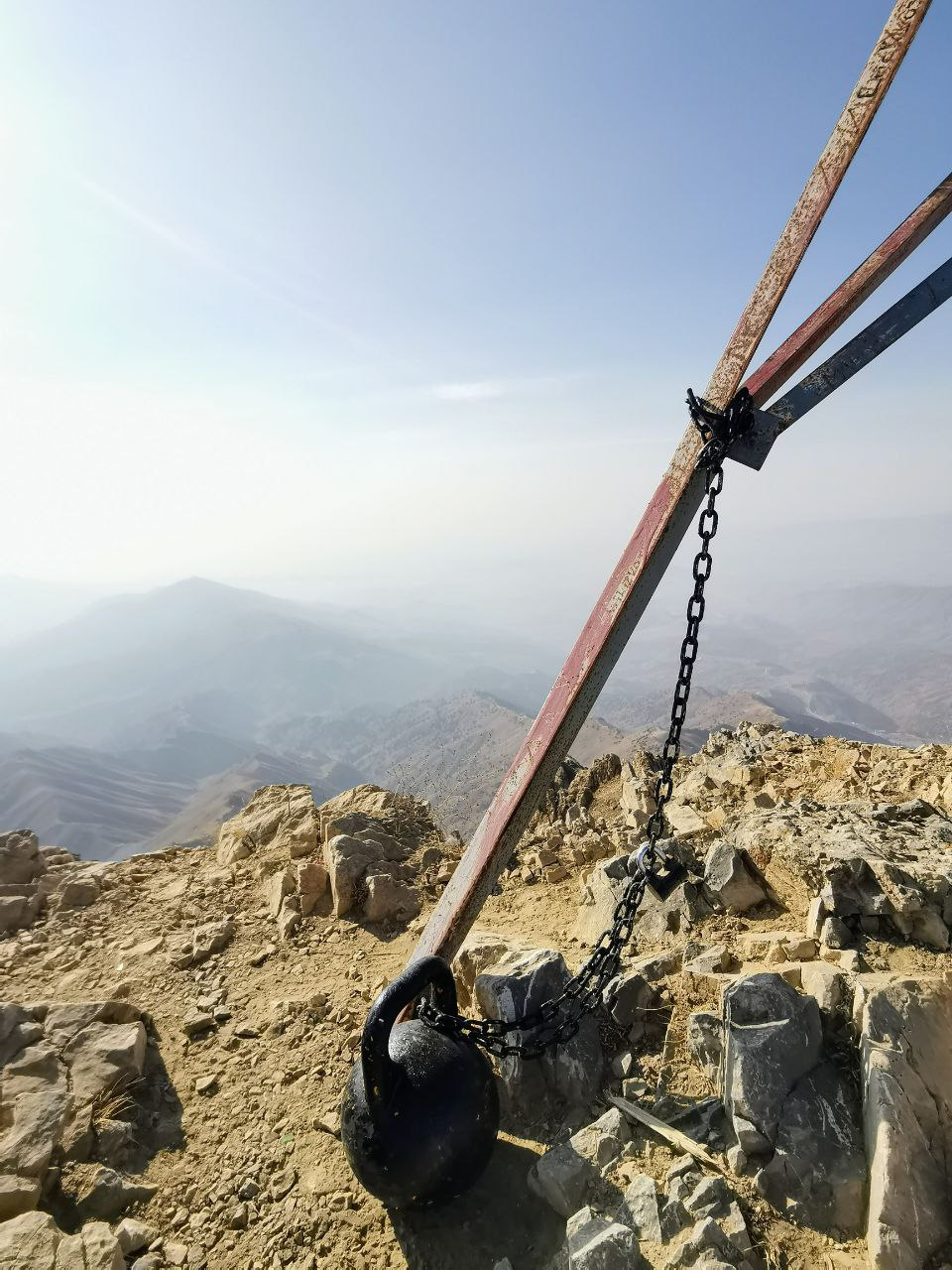
Somebody brought the kettlebell on Great Chimgan peak.
