= Sumsar =

Sumsar Сумсар
- Location within Kyrgyzstan
- Coordinates: 41°18′0″N 71°18′36″E
- Country: Kyrgyzstan
- Region: Jalal-Abad Region
- District: Chatkal District
- Urban-type settlement: 1952
- Elevation: 1,328 m (4,357 ft)

Population (2021)
  - Total: 2,802
- Time zone: UTC+6

Sumsar is a village in Chatkal District of Jalal-Abad Region of Kyrgyzstan. Its population was 2,802 in 2021. Until 2012 it was an urban-type settlement. It is situated in the foothills of the Chatkal Range.

A lead and zinc mine was located in Sumsar. The mine was exploited by the Sumsar company who also operated a uranium mine in neighbouring Shekaftar. The company left behind three huge tailings site containing toxic waste: Most of Tailings No. 1 have slipped into the Sumsar river. Tailings No. 3 have never been covered, leaving a fine dust exposed to the wind. Tailings No. 2 is also in need of repairs. The mill tailings of the lead and zinc milling in Sumsar and the low-grade uranium ore heaps in Shekaftar need an urgent remedial action because the legacy sites became chronic sources of toxic and radioactive contaminants for the Sumsar-Say River. The legacy sites are approximately 10–15 km upstream from the northern fringes of the Fergana valley that belongs to the most important agricultural areas of Soviet Central Asia.

In early 2016, a joint mission by the NGO Swiss Foundation for Mine Action (Fondation Suisse de déminage, FSD) and the Kyrgyzstan Emergency Situations Ministry found that the former Sumsar lead and zinc mining and ore processing area is located in an ecologically very sensitive environment and represents a constant threat of elevated exposures to chemical contaminants for the resident populations in the Sumsar valley.

== Population ==
Historical population
Year	Pop.	±% p.a.
1970	4,219	—
1979	3,836	−1.05%
1989	5,811	+4.24%
1999	5,368	−0.79%
2009	5,967	+1.06%
2021	2,802	−6.10%
Note: resident population; Sources:
