= Chapchyma Pass =

Mountain pass in Kyrgyzstan

- Kyrgyz: Чапчыма ашуусу
- Location within Kyrgyzstan
- Elevation: 2,841 metres (9,321 ft)
- Traversed by: National road M-109

Third Approach
- Location: Kyrgyzstan
- Range: Chatkal Range
- Coordinates: 41°32′10″N 70°48′31″E

Chapchyma Pass (Kyrgyz: Чапчыма ашуусу) is a pass in Jalal-Abad Region of Kyrgyzstan crossing Chatkal Range at the elevation of 2,841 m (9,321 ft) and linking Kasan-Say and Chatkal valleys. There is a road maintenance unit on the pass. Angren weather station is on the north side. The road of national significance М-109 (as per the national road classification) connecting Shamaldy-Say, Kerben, Ala-Buka, Kanysh-Kyya, and Kyzyl-Adyr crosses the pass.
