= Khazret Sultan =

Mountain on the Uzbek-Tajik border

Khazret Sultan Hazrati Sulton choʻqqisi
- Location within Uzbekistan

Highest point
- Elevation: 4,643 m (15,233 ft)
- Prominence: 564 m (1,850 ft)
- Listing: Country high point
- Coordinates: 38°56′54″N 68°10′20″E

Geography
- Location: Tajikistan–Uzbekistan border
- Parent range: Gissar Range, Pamir Mountains

Climbing
- Easiest route: Dushanbe (Tajikistan) through Varzob gorge & Lake Iskanderkul

Khazret Sultan (Uzbek: Hazrati Sulton choʻqqisi) is a mountain in Uzbekistan, with an elevation of 4,643 metres (15,233 ft). It is considered to be the highest point in this country.

The mountain is located on the border of Uzbekistan's Surkhondaryo Region and Tajikistan's Sughd Region, in the Gissar Range. According to the 1997 book Guide to the butterflies of Russia and adjacent territories: Lepidoptera, Rhopalocera (vol. 1), the species Colias wiskotti and Melanargia parce were discovered in the 19th century on this mountain.

The mountain was formerly known as Peak of the 22nd Congress of the Communist Party, which was cited as the country's highest point in 2008 by The Sydney Morning Herald. It was surveyed in 1980 by the Soviet Union at 4,643 metres (15,233 ft). In 2025, a survey published in the Progress in Physical Geography, claimed another peak, Alpomish, measured by mountaineer Eric Gilbertson, was the country's highest point. As of December 2025, Uzbek officials still list Khazret Sultan.

Another mountain near Gelon has the same name, also known as "The Holy Mountain," which is a popular tourism destination for mountaineering and pilgrimage.

== See also ==
- Geography of Uzbekistan
- List of mountains of Tajikistan
