= Kanysh-Kyya =

- Village
- Location within Kyrgyzstan
- Coordinates: 41°45′0″N 71°4′48″E
- Country: Kyrgyzstan
- Region: Jalal-Abad Region
- District: Chatkal District
- Elevation: 1,859 m (6,099 ft)

Population (2021)
  - Total: 4,805
- Time zone: UTC+6

Kanysh-Kyya (Kyrgyz: Каныш-Кыя; Russian: Каныш-Кия, romanized: Kanysh-Kiya) is a village in the Chatkal river valley of Jalal-Abad Region, Kyrgyzstan. Its population was 4,805 in 2021. It is the administrative seat of Chatkal District. It is served by the Kanysh-Kiya Airport.
