= Chandalash =

Chandalash Sandalash
- Location within Kyrgyzstan
- Native name: Чандалаш (Kyrgyz)

Location
- Country: Kyrgyzstan
- Region: Jalal-Abad Region
- District: Chatkal District

Physical characteristics
- Source: Talas Alatau
- Mouth: Chatkal
  - coordinates: 41.6820°N 70.8771°E
- Length: 94 km (58 mi)
- Basin size: 1,157 km^{2} (447 sq mi)
- Discharge
  - average: 11.7 m^{3}/s (410 cu ft/s)
  - minimum: 2.8 m^{3}/s (99 cu ft/s)
  - maximum: 30.1 m^{3}/s (1,060 cu ft/s)

Basin features
- Progression: Chatkal→ Chirchiq→ Syr Darya→ North Aral Sea
- Tributaries
  - right: Kaiyng-Suu,

The Chandalash (Kyrgyz: Чандалаш) is a river in the Pskem Mountains of Chatkal District in Jalal-Abad Region in western Kyrgyzstan. The river is formed at the south west slope of Talas Alatau and flows into the Chatkal. It is 94 kilometres (58 mi) long, and has a drainage basin of 1,157 square kilometres (447 sq mi). The average annual discharge is 11.7 m^{3}/s (410 cu ft/s). The maximum flow is 30.1 m^{3}/s (1,060 cu ft/s) in June, and the minimum - 2.7 m^{3}/s (95 cu ft/s) - 2.8 m^{3}/s (99 cu ft/s) in March.
