= Kyzyl-Tokoy =

Kyzyl-Tokoy Кызыл-Токой
- Location within Kyrgyzstan
- Coordinates: 41°22′48″N 71°19′48″E
- Country: Kyrgyzstan
- Region: Jalal-Abad
- District: Chatkal
- Elevation: 1,231 m (4,039 ft)

Population (2021)
  - Total: 1,975
- Time zone: UTC+6

Kyzyl-Tokoy (Kyrgyz: Кызыл-Токой) is a village in Jalal-Abad Region of Kyrgyzstan. It is part of the Chatkal District. Its population was 1,975 in 2021.
