= Ak-Tash, Jalal-Abad =

Ak-Tash
- Location within Kyrgyzstan
- Coordinates: 41°42′10″N 70°38′50″E
- Country: Kyrgyzstan
- Region: Jalal-Abad Region
- District: Chatkal District
- Elevation: 1,612 m (5,289 ft)

Population (2021)
  - Total: 1,491
- Time zone: UTC+6

Ak-Tash is a village in Jalal-Abad Region of Kyrgyzstan. Its population was 1,491 in 2021.
