= Ters (river) =

- Native name: Терс (Kyrgyz)

Location
- Country: Kyrgyzstan

Physical characteristics
- Source: Chatkal Range
  - location: Ala-Buka District
- Mouth: Chatkal
  - coordinates: 41°40′00″N 70°43′34″E
- Length: 40 km (25 mi)
- Basin size: 540 km^{2} (210 sq mi)
- Discharge
  - average: 8.81 m^{3}/s (311 cu ft/s)
  - minimum: 0.3 m^{3}/s (11 cu ft/s)
  - maximum: 67.6 m^{3}/s (2,390 cu ft/s)

Basin features
- Progression: Chatkal→ Chirchiq→ Syr Darya→ North Aral Sea

The Ters (Kyrgyz: Терс, Russian: Терс) is a river in Ala-Buka District of Jalal-Abad Region of Kyrgyzstan. It rises on northern slopes of Chatkal Range and flows into Chatkal. The length of the river is 40 km (25 mi) and the basin area 540 km^{2} (210 mi^{2}). It is fed by majorly snow and rainwater and by springs. Average annual discharge is 8.81 m^{3}/s (311 cu ft/s). The maximum flow is 67.6 m^{3}/s (2,390 cu ft/s), and the minimum - 0.3 m^{3}/s (11 cu ft/s).
