= Kurulush =

Kurulush Курулуш
- Location within Kyrgyzstan
- Coordinates: 41°39′40″N 70°47′0″E
- Country: Kyrgyzstan
- Region: Jalal-Abad Region
- District: Chatkal District

Population (2021)
  - Total: 1,968
- Time zone: UTC+6

Kurulush is a village in Jalal-Abad Region of Kyrgyzstan. Its population was 1,968 in 2021.
