= Korgon-Say =

- Location within Kyrgyzstan
- Coordinates: 41°51′20″N 71°13′10″E
- Country: Kyrgyzstan
- Region: Jalal-Abad Region
- District: Chatkal District
- Elevation: 1,810 m (5,940 ft)

Population (2021)
  - Total: 875
- Time zone: UTC+6

Korgon-Say is a village in Jalal-Abad Region of Kyrgyzstan. Its population was 875 in 2021.
