= Geography of Uzbekistan =

Coordinates: 41°00′N 64°00′E

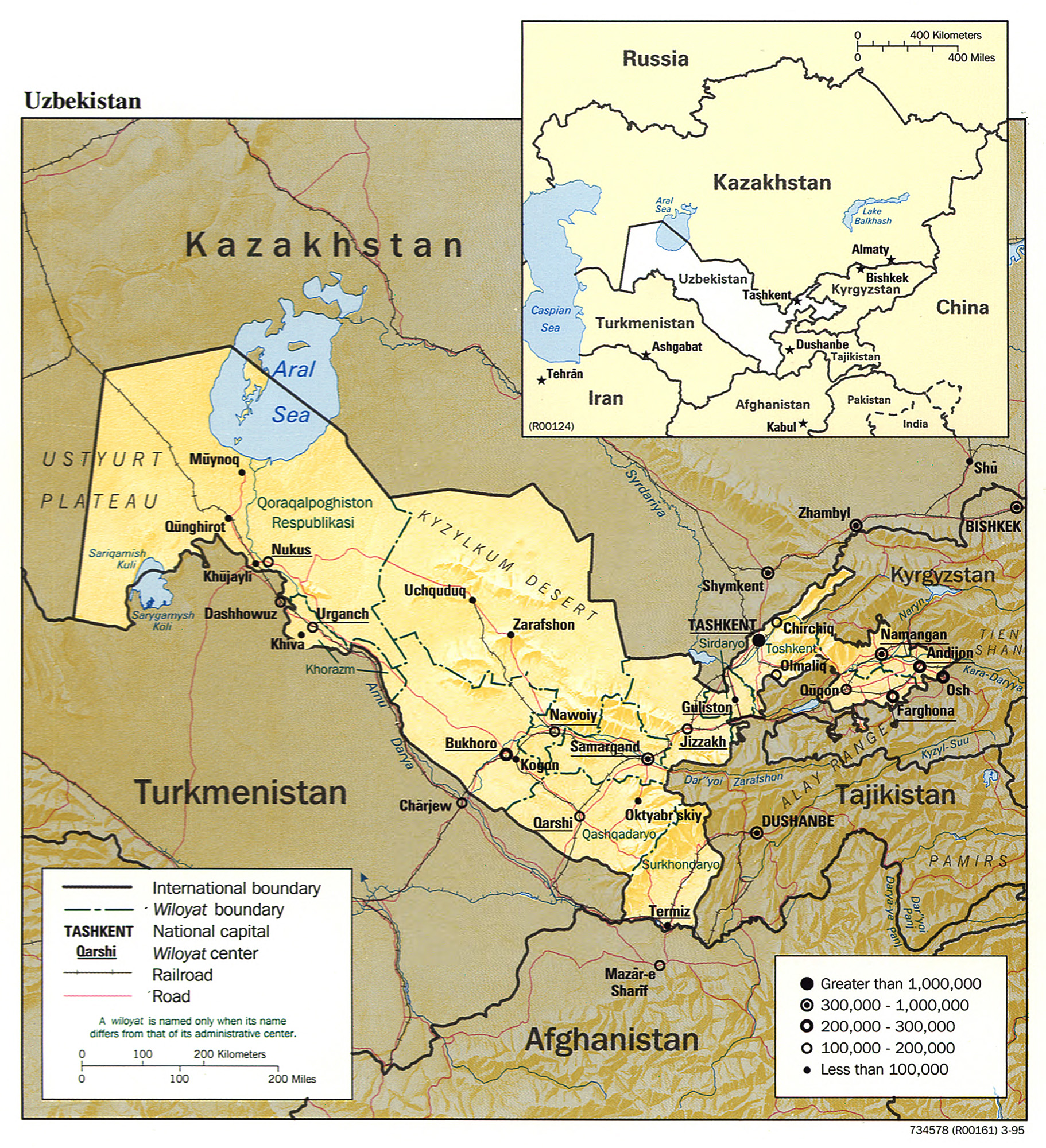
- Continent: Asia
- Region: Central Asia
- Area
  - Total: 448,978 km^{2} (173,351 sq mi)
- Coastline: 0 km (0 mi)
- Highest point: Khazret Sultan; 4,643 m
- Lowest point: Sarygamysh Lake −12 m
- Longest river: Zarafshon
- Largest lake: Aral Sea (historical); Aydar Lake (current)
- Climate: Cold Semi-arid climate Cold Desert climate

Uzbekistan is a country in Central Asia, located north of Turkmenistan and Afghanistan. With an area of approximately 448,900 square kilometers, Uzbekistan stretches 1,425 km (885 mi) from west to east and 930 km (580 mi) from north to south. It borders Turkmenistan to the southwest, Kazakhstan to the north and Tajikistan and Kyrgyzstan to the south and east. Uzbekistan also has four small exclaves in Kyrgyzstan.

Uzbekistan is the only Central Asian state to border all of the other four. Uzbekistan also shares a short border with Afghanistan to the south. As the Caspian Sea is an inland sea with no direct link to the oceans, Uzbekistan is one of only two "doubly landlocked" countries—countries completely surrounded by other landlocked countries. The other is Liechtenstein.

== Topography and drainage ==
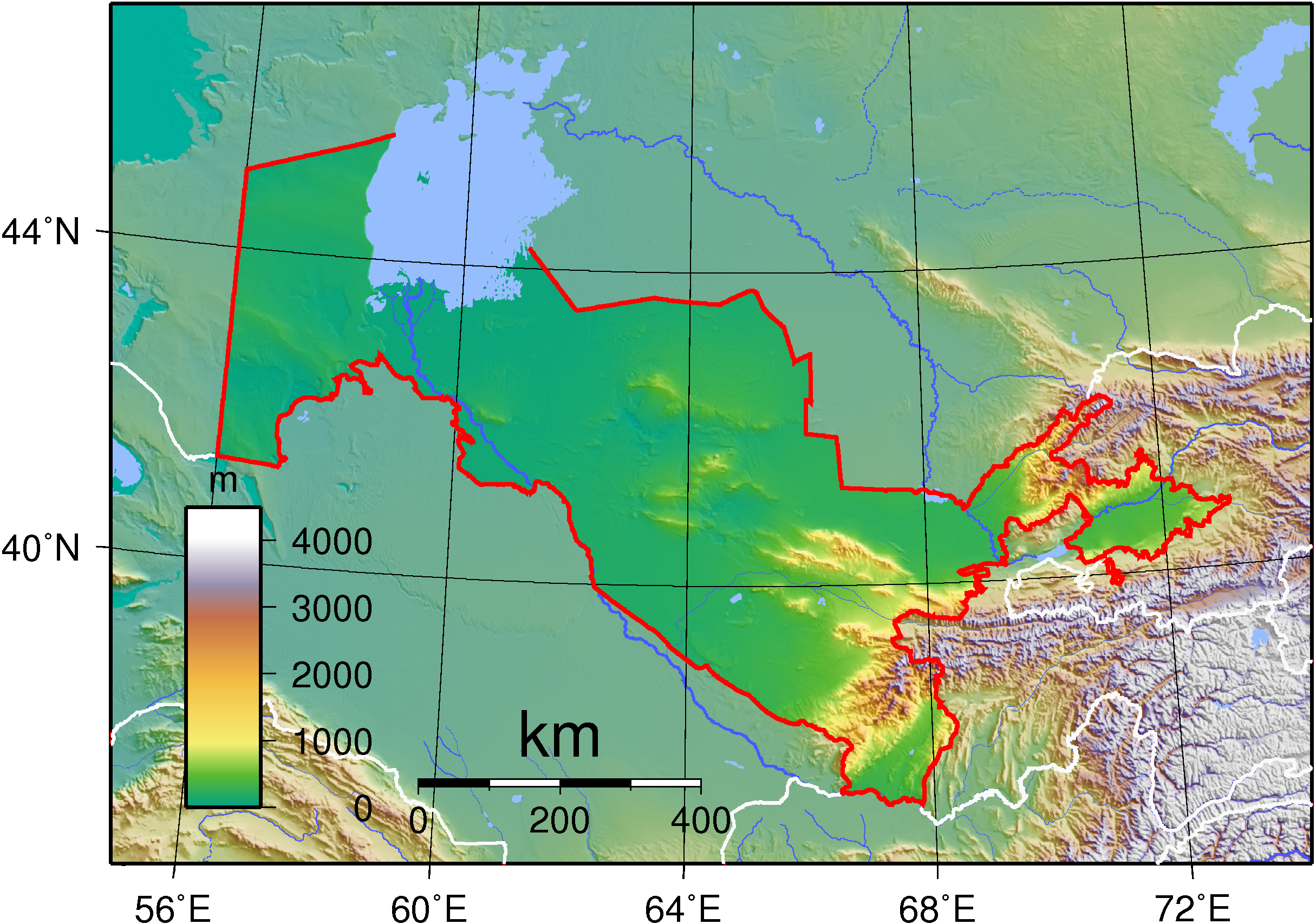
Topography of Uzbekistan

The physical environment of Uzbekistan is diverse, ranging from the flat, desert topography that comprises almost 80% of the country's territory to mountain peaks in the east reaching about 4,500 metres (14,800 ft) above sea level. The southeastern portion of Uzbekistan is characterized by the foothills of the Tian Shan mountains, which rise higher in neighboring Kyrgyzstan and Tajikistan and form a natural border between Central Asia and China. The vast Qizilqum (Turkic for "red sand"—Russian spelling Kyzyl Kum) Desert, shared with southern Kazakhstan, dominates the northern lowland portion of Uzbekistan. The most fertile part of Uzbekistan, the Fergana Valley, is an area of about 21,440 square kilometres (8,280 mi^{2}) directly east of the Qizilqum and surrounded by mountain ranges to the north, south, and east. The western end of the valley is defined by the course of the Syr Darya, which runs across the northeastern sector of Uzbekistan from southern Kazakhstan into the Qizilqum. Although the Fergana Valley receives just 100 to 300 millimetres (3.9 to 11.8 in) of rainfall per year, only small patches of desert remain in the center and along ridges on the periphery of the valley.

Water resources, which are unevenly distributed, are in short supply in most of Uzbekistan. The vast plains that occupy two-thirds of Uzbekistan's territory have little water, and there are few lakes. The two largest rivers feeding Uzbekistan are the Amu Darya and the Syr Darya, which originate in the mountains of Tajikistan and Kyrgyzstan, respectively. These rivers form the two main river basins of Central Asia; they are used primarily for irrigation, and several artificial canals have been built to expand the supply of arable land in the Fergana Valley and elsewhere. During the Soviet Era, a plan was devised in which Kyrgyzstan and Tajikistan provided water from these two rivers to Kazakhstan, Turkmenistan, and Uzbekistan in summer, and these three countries provided Kyrgyzstan and Tajikistan with oil and gas during the winter in return. However, this system dissolved after the collapse of the USSR, and a new resource-sharing plan has yet to be put in place. According to the International Crisis Group, this situation could lead to irreparable regional destabilization if it is not resolved. A shallow lake, Sarygamysh Lake, sits on the border with Turkmenistan.

Another important feature of Uzbekistan's physical environment is the significant seismic activity that dominates much of the country. Indeed, much of Uzbekistan's capital city, Tashkent, was destroyed in a major earthquake in 1966, and other earthquakes have caused significant damage before and since the Tashkent disaster. The mountain areas are especially prone to earthquakes.

== Climate ==
Uzbekistan map of Köppen climate classification

Uzbekistan's climate has sometimes been broadly described as Mediterranean and humid continental, meaning that it has both relatively hot summers and relatively cool winters. However, only a small area in eastern Uzbekistan is classified as Mediterranean and humid continental under the Köppen climate classification. A vast majority of its total area — including all of the sparsely populated western and central regions — is classified as either cold desert (Köppen BWk) or cold steppe (BSk).

Summer temperatures often surpass 40 °C (104 °F); winter temperatures average between −1 °C (30 °F) and −3 °C (27 °F), but may fall as low as −40 °C (−40 °F). Most of the country also is quite arid, with average annual rainfall amounting to between 100 and 200 millimeters (3.9 and 7.9 in) and occurring mostly in winter and spring. Between June and September, little precipitation falls, essentially stopping the growth of vegetation during that period of time.

Climate data for Tashkent (1991–2020 normals, extremes 1867–present)
Month	Jan	Feb	Mar	Apr	May	Jun	Jul	Aug	Sep	Oct	Nov	Dec	Year
Record high °C (°F)	22.6 (72.7)	27.0 (80.6)	32.5 (90.5)	36.6 (97.9)	39.9 (103.8)	43.0 (109.4)	44.6 (112.3)	43.1 (109.6)	40.0 (104.0)	37.5 (99.5)	31.6 (88.9)	27.3 (81.1)	44.6 (112.3)
Mean daily maximum °C (°F)	7.2 (45.0)	9.5 (49.1)	16.0 (60.8)	22.3 (72.1)	28.0 (82.4)	33.6 (92.5)	35.9 (96.6)	34.9 (94.8)	29.5 (85.1)	22.2 (72.0)	14.1 (57.4)	8.6 (47.5)	21.8 (71.3)
Daily mean °C (°F)	2.3 (36.1)	4.2 (39.6)	10.2 (50.4)	15.9 (60.6)	21.1 (70.0)	26.2 (79.2)	28.3 (82.9)	26.6 (79.9)	21.0 (69.8)	14.4 (57.9)	8.1 (46.6)	3.5 (38.3)	15.2 (59.3)
Mean daily minimum °C (°F)	−1.3 (29.7)	0.1 (32.2)	5.3 (41.5)	10.1 (50.2)	14.3 (57.7)	18.4 (65.1)	20.1 (68.2)	18.4 (65.1)	13.4 (56.1)	8.3 (46.9)	3.6 (38.5)	−0.1 (31.8)	9.2 (48.6)
Record low °C (°F)	−28 (−18)	−25.6 (−14.1)	−16.9 (1.6)	−6.3 (20.7)	−1.7 (28.9)	3.8 (38.8)	8.2 (46.8)	5.7 (42.3)	0.1 (32.2)	−11.2 (11.8)	−22.1 (−7.8)	−29.5 (−21.1)	−29.5 (−21.1)
Average precipitation mm (inches)	54.9 (2.16)	72.1 (2.84)	66.4 (2.61)	63.3 (2.49)	41.1 (1.62)	16.8 (0.66)	3.4 (0.13)	2.1 (0.08)	4.6 (0.18)	23.7 (0.93)	51.2 (2.02)	58.4 (2.30)	458.0 (18.03)
Average extreme snow depth cm (inches)	3 (1.2)	2 (0.8)	0 (0)	0 (0)	0 (0)	0 (0)	0 (0)	0 (0)	0 (0)	0 (0)	0 (0)	2 (0.8)	3 (1.2)
Average precipitation days (≥ 1.0 mm)	14	14	14	13	11	8	4	3	4	8	11	13	117
Average rainy days	14	13	14	12	11	7	4	3	3	7	10	12	110
Average snowy days	9	7	2	0	0	0	0	0	0	1	2	6	27
Average relative humidity (%)	73	68	61	60	53	40	39	42	45	57	66	73	56
Mean monthly sunshine hours	104.7	119.4	169.2	222.7	303.0	352.8	386.5	353.4	283.8	220.4	135.0	104.7	2,755.6
Source 1: Pogoda.ru.net
Source 2: NOAA

Climate data for Samarkand (1991–2020, extremes 1891–present)
Month	Jan	Feb	Mar	Apr	May	Jun	Jul	Aug	Sep	Oct	Nov	Dec	Year
Record high °C (°F)	23.2 (73.8)	26.7 (80.1)	32.2 (90.0)	36.2 (97.2)	39.5 (103.1)	41.6 (106.9)	42.4 (108.3)	41.0 (105.8)	38.6 (101.5)	35.2 (95.4)	31.5 (88.7)	27.5 (81.5)	42.4 (108.3)
Mean daily maximum °C (°F)	7.3 (45.1)	9.5 (49.1)	15.2 (59.4)	21.4 (70.5)	27.0 (80.6)	32.4 (90.3)	34.5 (94.1)	33.3 (91.9)	28.6 (83.5)	22.0 (71.6)	14.4 (57.9)	9.1 (48.4)	21.2 (70.2)
Daily mean °C (°F)	2.3 (36.1)	4.0 (39.2)	9.3 (48.7)	15.2 (59.4)	20.4 (68.7)	25.4 (77.7)	27.2 (81.0)	25.6 (78.1)	20.6 (69.1)	14.1 (57.4)	8.0 (46.4)	3.7 (38.7)	14.7 (58.4)
Mean daily minimum °C (°F)	−1.3 (29.7)	−0.2 (31.6)	4.6 (40.3)	9.7 (49.5)	14.1 (57.4)	18.0 (64.4)	19.5 (67.1)	17.9 (64.2)	13.5 (56.3)	7.8 (46.0)	3.2 (37.8)	−0.2 (31.6)	8.9 (48.0)
Record low °C (°F)	−25.4 (−13.7)	−22 (−8)	−14.9 (5.2)	−6.8 (19.8)	−1.3 (29.7)	4.8 (40.6)	8.6 (47.5)	7.8 (46.0)	0.0 (32.0)	−6.4 (20.5)	−18.1 (−0.6)	−22.8 (−9.0)	−25.4 (−13.7)
Average precipitation mm (inches)	41.1 (1.62)	52.2 (2.06)	73.2 (2.88)	62.9 (2.48)	40.0 (1.57)	6.8 (0.27)	1.6 (0.06)	1.6 (0.06)	2.7 (0.11)	16.0 (0.63)	40.3 (1.59)	39.2 (1.54)	377.6 (14.87)
Average precipitation days (≥ 1.0 mm)	14	13	15	13	11	5	2	2	2	6	10	12	105
Average rainy days	8	10	13	11	9	3	2	1	2	6	8	9	82
Average snowy days	9	7	3	0.3	0.1	0	0	0	0	0.3	2	6	28
Average relative humidity (%)	76	74	70	63	54	42	42	43	47	59	68	74	59
Average dew point °C (°F)	−2 (28)	−1 (30)	2 (36)	6 (43)	9 (48)	9 (48)	10 (50)	9 (48)	6 (43)	4 (39)	2 (36)	−1 (30)	4 (40)
Mean monthly sunshine hours	119.2	130.9	172.2	228.8	297.7	345.5	373.1	358.9	305.9	242.6	150.7	120.2	2,845.7
Average ultraviolet index	2	3	3	4	5	6	6	6	4	3	2	2	4
Source 1: Pogoda.ru.net
Source 2: Weather Atlas (UV), Time and Date (dewpoints, 1985–2015), NOAA

Climate data for Qarshi (1991–2020)
Month	Jan	Feb	Mar	Apr	May	Jun	Jul	Aug	Sep	Oct	Nov	Dec	Year
Mean daily maximum °C (°F)	9.1 (48.4)	11.9 (53.4)	17.9 (64.2)	24.6 (76.3)	31.3 (88.3)	36.7 (98.1)	38.4 (101.1)	36.6 (97.9)	31.4 (88.5)	24.5 (76.1)	16.3 (61.3)	10.5 (50.9)	24.1 (75.4)
Daily mean °C (°F)	3.4 (38.1)	5.6 (42.1)	11.2 (52.2)	17.4 (63.3)	23.6 (74.5)	28.8 (83.8)	30.5 (86.9)	28.1 (82.6)	22.4 (72.3)	15.8 (60.4)	9.2 (48.6)	4.5 (40.1)	16.7 (62.1)
Mean daily minimum °C (°F)	−0.6 (30.9)	1.0 (33.8)	5.9 (42.6)	11.3 (52.3)	16.4 (61.5)	20.6 (69.1)	22.4 (72.3)	19.9 (67.8)	14.4 (57.9)	8.6 (47.5)	3.8 (38.8)	0.5 (32.9)	10.4 (50.7)
Average precipitation mm (inches)	35.7 (1.41)	42.1 (1.66)	46.5 (1.83)	34.8 (1.37)	18.8 (0.74)	1.6 (0.06)	0.6 (0.02)	0.2 (0.01)	1.1 (0.04)	4.7 (0.19)	24.4 (0.96)	27.2 (1.07)	237.7 (9.36)
Average precipitation days (≥ 1.0 mm)	11	11	12	9	7	2	1	0	1	4	8	10	76
Average relative humidity (%)	79	74	72	64	48	33	30	33	38	48	62	78	66
Source 1: NOAA
Source 2: Deutscher Wetterdienst (humidity)

Climate data for Termez (1991-2020, extremes 1936-present)
Month	Jan	Feb	Mar	Apr	May	Jun	Jul	Aug	Sep	Oct	Nov	Dec	Year
Record high °C (°F)	23.9 (75.0)	30.1 (86.2)	37.3 (99.1)	39.1 (102.4)	43.6 (110.5)	47.0 (116.6)	47.0 (116.6)	46.3 (115.3)	41.5 (106.7)	37.5 (99.5)	33.5 (92.3)	26.7 (80.1)	47.0 (116.6)
Mean daily maximum °C (°F)	10.7 (51.3)	13.4 (56.1)	19.6 (67.3)	26.9 (80.4)	33.2 (91.8)	38.2 (100.8)	39.8 (103.6)	38.0 (100.4)	33.0 (91.4)	25.9 (78.6)	17.9 (64.2)	12.0 (53.6)	25.7 (78.3)
Daily mean °C (°F)	4.6 (40.3)	6.9 (44.4)	12.7 (54.9)	19.2 (66.6)	25.0 (77.0)	29.5 (85.1)	30.8 (87.4)	28.6 (83.5)	23.4 (74.1)	16.9 (62.4)	10.4 (50.7)	5.5 (41.9)	17.8 (64.0)
Mean daily minimum °C (°F)	−0.2 (31.6)	1.8 (35.2)	6.8 (44.2)	12.1 (53.8)	16.1 (61.0)	19.4 (66.9)	20.0 (68.0)	17.3 (63.1)	13.7 (56.7)	9.1 (48.4)	4.7 (40.5)	0.7 (33.3)	10.1 (50.2)
Record low °C (°F)	−23.9 (−11.0)	−21.7 (−7.1)	−7.9 (17.8)	−2.0 (28.4)	−0.1 (31.8)	11.4 (52.5)	12.9 (55.2)	9.3 (48.7)	4.6 (40.3)	−4.2 (24.4)	−11.0 (12.2)	−18.4 (−1.1)	−23.9 (−11.0)
Average precipitation mm (inches)	22.9 (0.90)	29.6 (1.17)	31.5 (1.24)	24.3 (0.96)	9.5 (0.37)	1.3 (0.05)	0.2 (0.01)	0 (0)	0.5 (0.02)	3.0 (0.12)	20.0 (0.79)	17.8 (0.70)	160.6 (6.33)
Average precipitation days (≥ 1.0 mm)	10	11	11	9	6	2	0	0	1	3	8	9	70
Average rainy days	7	10	11	8	5	1	1	0.2	0	3	6	8	60
Average snowy days	4	3	1	0.03	0.1	0	0	0	0.03	0.1	1	3	12
Average relative humidity (%)	77	71	66	57	45	36	36	38	45	53	65	76	55
Mean monthly sunshine hours	151.5	155.5	207.7	266.5	340.4	378.1	394.5	369.0	322.8	267.9	184.4	150.7	3,189
Source 1: Pogoda.ru.net
Source 2: NOAA

Climate data for Denov (1991–2020)
Month	Jan	Feb	Mar	Apr	May	Jun	Jul	Aug	Sep	Oct	Nov	Dec	Year
Mean daily maximum °C (°F)	10.3 (50.5)	12.6 (54.7)	18.7 (65.7)	24.9 (76.8)	30.3 (86.5)	35.7 (96.3)	37.3 (99.1)	35.5 (95.9)	31.4 (88.5)	25.3 (77.5)	17.7 (63.9)	12.2 (54.0)	24.3 (75.7)
Daily mean °C (°F)	5.1 (41.2)	7.1 (44.8)	12.4 (54.3)	18.2 (64.8)	23.5 (74.3)	28.5 (83.3)	29.8 (85.6)	27.7 (81.9)	23.2 (73.8)	17.1 (62.8)	11.0 (51.8)	6.8 (44.2)	17.5 (63.5)
Mean daily minimum °C (°F)	1.6 (34.9)	3.0 (37.4)	7.7 (45.9)	12.9 (55.2)	17.9 (64.2)	22.5 (72.5)	23.7 (74.7)	21.6 (70.9)	17.0 (62.6)	11.4 (52.5)	6.4 (43.5)	3.1 (37.6)	12.4 (54.3)
Average precipitation mm (inches)	44.7 (1.76)	59.3 (2.33)	66.2 (2.61)	51.3 (2.02)	28.5 (1.12)	4.7 (0.19)	0.4 (0.02)	0.1 (0.00)	1.0 (0.04)	11.1 (0.44)	34.4 (1.35)	44.5 (1.75)	346.2 (13.63)
Average precipitation days (≥ 1.0 mm)	10	11	11	9	6	2	1	0	1	3	7	9	70
Source: NOAA

== Environmental problems ==
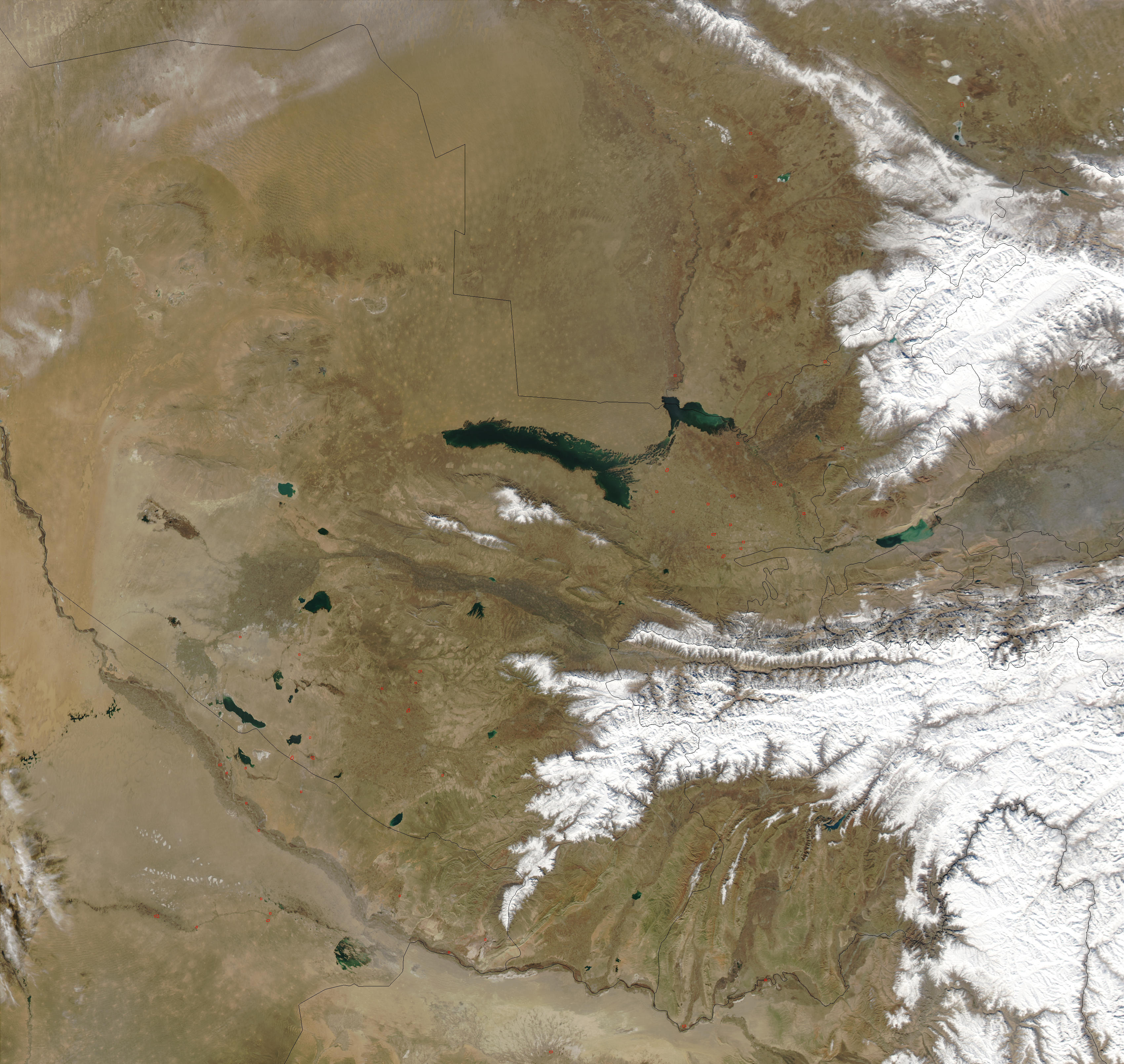
Uzbekistan, February 2003. Red dots indicate wildfires.

Uzbekistan is the seventh most Water stressed country in the world.

Despite Uzbekistan's rich and varied natural environment, decades of environmental neglect in the Soviet Union have combined with skewed economic policies in the Soviet south to make Uzbekistan one of the gravest of the CIS's many environmental crises. The heavy use of agrochemicals, diversion of huge amounts of irrigation water from the two rivers that feed the region, and the chronic lack of water treatment plants are among the factors that have caused health and environmental problems on an enormous scale.

Environmental devastation in Uzbekistan is best exemplified by the catastrophe of the Aral Sea. Because of diversion of the Amu Darya and Syr Darya for cotton cultivation and other purposes, what once was the world's fourth largest inland sea has shrunk in the past thirty years to only about one-third of its 1960 volume and less than half its 1960 geographical size. The desiccation and salinization of the lake have caused extensive storms of salt and dust from the sea's dried bottom, wreaking havoc on the region's agriculture and ecosystems and on the population's health. Desertification has led to the large-scale loss of plant and animal life, loss of arable land, changed climatic conditions, depleted yields on the cultivated land that remains, and destruction of historical and cultural monuments. Every year, many tons of salts reportedly are carried as far as 800 kilometers away. Regional experts assert that salt and dust storms from the Aral Sea have raised the level of particulate matter in the Earth's atmosphere by more than 5%, seriously affecting global climate change.

The Aral Sea disaster is only the most visible indicator of environmental decay, however. The Soviet approach to environmental management brought decades of poor water management and lack of water or sewage treatment facilities; inordinately heavy use of pesticides, herbicides, defoliants, and fertilizers in the fields; and construction of industrial enterprises without regard to human or environmental impact. Those policies present enormous environmental challenges throughout Uzbekistan.

Natural hazards
NA

Environment — current issues
- shrinkage of the Aral Sea is resulting in growing concentrations of chemical pesticides and natural salts; these substances are then blown from the increasingly exposed lake bed and contribute to desertification; water pollution from industrial wastes and the heavy use of fertilizers and pesticides is the cause of many human health disorders; increasing soil salination; soil contamination from agricultural chemicals, including DDT

Environment – international agreements
- party to:
  - Biodiversity, Climate Change, Climate Change-Kyoto Protocol, Desertification, Endangered Species, Environmental Modification, Hazardous Wastes, Ozone Layer Protection, Wetlands
- signed, but not ratified:
  - none of the selected agreements

=== Water pollution ===
Large-scale use of chemicals for cotton cultivation, inefficient irrigation systems, and poor drainage systems are examples of the conditions that led to a high filtration of salinized and contaminated water back into the soil. Post-Soviet policies have become even more dangerous; in the early 1990s, the average application of chemical fertilizers and insecticides throughout the Central Asian republics was 20 to 25 kilograms per hectare, compared with the former average of three kilograms per hectare for the entire Soviet Union. As a result, the supply of fresh water has received further contaminants. Industrial pollutants also have damaged Uzbekistan's water. In the Amu Darya, concentrations of phenol and oil products have been measured at far above acceptable health standards. In 1989 the Minister of Health of the Turkmen SSR described the Amu Darya as a sewage ditch for industrial and agricultural waste substances. Experts who monitored the river in 1995 reported even further deterioration.

In the early 1990s, about 60% of pollution control funding went to water-related projects, but only about half of cities and about one-quarter of villages have sewers. Communal water systems do not meet health standards; much of the population lacks drinking water systems and must drink water straight from contaminated irrigation ditches, canals, or the Amu Darya itself.

According to one report, virtually all the large underground fresh-water supplies in Uzbekistan are polluted by industrial and chemical wastes. An official in Uzbekistan's Ministry of Environment estimated that about half of the country's population lives in regions where the water is severely polluted. The government estimated in 1995 that only 230 of the country's 8,000 industrial enterprises were following pollution control standards.

=== Air pollution ===
Poor water management and heavy use of agricultural chemicals also have polluted the air. Salt and dust storms and the spraying of pesticides and defoliants for the cotton crop have led to severe degradation of air quality in rural areas.

In urban areas, factories and auto emissions are a growing threat to air quality. Fewer than half of factory smokestacks in Uzbekistan are equipped with filtration devices, and none has the capacity to filter gaseous emissions. In addition, a high percentage of existing filters are defective or out of operation. Air pollution data for Tashkent, Farghona, and Olmaliq show all three cities exceeding recommended levels of nitrous dioxide and particulates. High levels of heavy metals such as lead, nickel, zinc, copper, mercury, and manganese have been found in Uzbekistan's atmosphere, mainly from the burning of fossil fuels, waste materials, and ferrous and nonferrous metallurgy. Especially high concentrations of heavy metals have been reported in Toshkent Province and in the southern part of Uzbekistan near the Olmaliq Metallurgy Combine. In the mid-1990s, Uzbekistan's industrial production, about 60% of the total for the Central Asian nations excluding Kazakhstan, also yielded about 60% of the total volume of Central Asia's emissions of harmful substances into the atmosphere. Because automobiles are relatively scarce, automotive exhaust is a problem only in Tashkent and Farghona.

=== Land and soil pollution ===
The reduction of water in Uzbekistan has resulted in soil degradation, and the spread of the salt from the evaporated Aral Sea has contaminated the surrounding soil. The soil has lost much of its water due to the increased surface irrigation. The irrigation of farmlands with water from the Aral Sea has resulted in increased salinization of the soil, causing the farmland to be less productive and the destruction of a large portion of farmable land.

The amount of grasslands in Uzbekistan has gradually decreased mainly due to over-grazing and climate change. About 62.6% of the land in Uzbekistan is used for agriculture with 51.7% of that land used for permanent pasture.

The soil has been polluted by mining and smelting activities due to the spread of metals and other pollutants by wind. Smelter ash contaminated soil causes environmental risks such as reduction of soil respiration, contamination of microbial biomass, and negatively effecting trophic interactions. Many species of animals are sensitive to metal pollution and are directly exposed to it by living off of the land that has been polluted by the mining and smelting activities. The metals polluting the land and soil include copper, gold, lead, silver, metallic zinc, and others. An example is the metallurgical complex at Almalik in Uzbekistan that manufactures metals and has waste storage sites in surrounding areas, which pollute the soil, groundwater, and air with high amounts of copper, zinc, arsenic, lead, and cadmium. The mining complexes in Uzbekistan have created toxic waste that has spread through the land, groundwater, air, waterways, and soil.

The soil in Uzbekistan is also polluted by industrial waste. The improper handling and disposal of industrial waste has polluted the land in Uzbekistan and other countries in Central Asia. The evaporation of the Aral Sea exposed Vozrozhdeniya Island, also known as Resurrection Island, to the land and environment in Uzbekistan when the island transformed into a large peninsula. At Resurrection Island, the land and soil was polluted with weaponized and genetically modified pathogens due to a secret biological weapons program carried out by the Soviet military. The island was decontaminated by the Russian military, Government of Uzbekistan, and U.S. experts because of the health and environmental dangers it could have caused with its new connection to the land.

=== Government environmental policy ===
The government of Uzbekistan has acknowledged the extent of the country's environmental problems, and it has made a commitment to address them in its Biodiversity Action Plan. But the governmental structures to deal with these problems remain confused and ill-defined. Old agencies and organizations have been expanded to address these questions, and new ones have been created, resulting in a bureaucratic web of agencies with no generally understood commitment to attack environmental problems directly. Various nongovernmental and grassroots environmental organizations also have begun to form, some closely tied to the current government and others assuming an opposition stance. For example, environmental issues were prominent points in the original platform of Birlik, the first major opposition movement to emerge in Uzbekistan. By the mid-1990s, such issues had become a key concern of all opposition groups and a cause of growing concern among the population as a whole.

In the first half of the 1990s, many plans were proposed to limit or discourage economic practices that damage the environment. Despite discussion of programs to require payments for resources (especially water) and to collect fines from heavy polluters, however, little has been accomplished. The obstacles are a lack of law enforcement in these areas, inconsistent government economic and environmental planning, corruption, and the overwhelming concentration of power in the hands of a president who shows little tolerance of grassroots activity.

International donors and Western assistance agencies have devised programs to transfer technology and know-how to address these problems. But the country's environmental problems are predominantly the result of abuse and mismanagement of natural resources promoted by political and economic priorities. Until the political will emerges to regard environmental and health problems as a threat not only to the government in power but also to the very survival of Uzbekistan, the increasingly grave environmental threat will not be addressed effectively.

The Government of Uzbekistan joined forces with Kazakhstan, Turkmenistan, Tajikistan, and Kyrgyzstan in 1992 to form the International Fund for Saving the Aral Sea (IFAS) and in 1993 to form the Interstate Council on the Problems of the Aral Sea Basin (ICAS). The ICAS was formed to work with the World Bank in order to improve the conditions of the Aral Sea, but was disbanded in 1997 to form IFAS.

The Uzbekistan government along with NGOs and U.S. international donors has been working to help improve the health conditions in Uzbekistan since the 1990s. This has led to improvements in drinking water. The World Bank and United Nations have also been involved in preparing possible solutions for the environmental problems in Uzbekistan. The World Bank worked with the countries in the Aral Sea Basin to form the Aral Sea Basin Assistance Program (ASBP) in the early 1990s. The main roles of the ASBP were the rehabilitation of the Aral Sea area that was destroyed through evaporation, the planning and management of the Amu Darya and Syr Darya rivers, and the construction of institutions to plan and implement the rehabilitation and management of the water resources surrounding the Aral Sea. The World Bank also formed the Water and Environmental Management Project in 1998 that was funded by both the World Bank and the Global Environmental Facility (GEF). The program was funded by the World Bank, the United Nations Development Program (UNDP), the United States Agency for International Development (USAID), the Asian Development Bank, as well as the governments of a few countries. Other groups that contributed to the rehabilitation and management of the Aral Sea include the European Union, the United Nations, UNESCO, United Nations Development Program (UNDP), the North Atlantic Treaty Organization (NATO), and the Science for Peace program.

== Area and boundaries ==
Area
- total: 447,400 km²
  - country rank in the world: 56th
- land: 425,400 km²
- water: 22,000 km²

Area — comparative
- same size as Morocco
- slightly smaller than Sweden
- Australia comparative: slightly less than twice the size of Victoria
- Canada comparative: slightly smaller than the Yukon
- United Kingdom comparative: approximately 5/6 larger than the United Kingdom
- United States comparative: slightly larger than California
- EU comparative: slightly less than 1 1/2 times the size of Italy

Land boundaries
- Total: 6,221 km
- Border countries: Afghanistan (137 km), Kazakhstan (2,203 km), Kyrgyzstan (1,099 km), Tajikistan (1,161 km), Turkmenistan (1,621 km)

Coastline
- 0 km (landlocked)

Maritime claims
- None.
  - Note: Uzbekistan is one of only two countries (Liechtenstein) in the world that are doubly landlocked.

Elevation extremes
- Lowest point: Sariqarnish Kuli −12 metres (39 ft) below sea level.
- Highest point: Alpomish Peak, 4,668 metres (15,315 ft)

== Resources and land uses ==
Natural resources
natural gas, petroleum, coal, gold, uranium, silver, copper, lead and zinc, tungsten, molybdenum

Land use
- arable land: 9.61%
- permanent crops: 0.8%
- other: 89.58% (2011)

Irrigated land
- 41,980 km² (2005)

Total renewable water resources
- 48.87 km^{2} (2011)

Freshwater withdrawal (domestic/industrial/agricultural)
- total: 56 km^{2}/yr (7%/3%/90%)
  - per capita: 2,113 m^{3}/yr (2005)

== Deserts ==
Almost 80% of Uzbekistan (360,000 km² of 450,000 km²) are the deserts.

1. Kyzylkum 298,000 km² among Kazakhstan, Turkmenistan and Uzbekistan
2. Ustyurt 200,000 km² among Kazakhstan, Turkmenistan and Uzbekistan
3. Aralkum 68,000 km² between Kazakhstan and Uzbekistan
4. Mirzachoʻl 10,000 km² Uzbekistan
5. Central Asian northern desert 663,000 km² among Kazakhstan, Kyrgyzstan and Uzbekistan
