= Chakmak-Suu =

Chakmak-Suu Чакмак-Суу
- Location within Kyrgyzstan
- Coordinates: 41°43′48″N 70°59′49″E
- Country: Kyrgyzstan
- Region: Jalal-Abad Region
- District: Chatkal District

Population (2021)
  - Total: 603
- Time zone: UTC+6

Chakmak-Suu is a village in Jalal-Abad Region of Kyrgyzstan. Its population was 603 in 2021.
