= Bashky-Terek =

Bashky-Terek Башкы-Терек
- Location within Kyrgyzstan
- Coordinates: 41°55′48″N 71°21′0″E
- Country: Kyrgyzstan
- Region: Jalal-Abad Region
- District: Chatkal District
- Elevation: 1,966 m (6,450 ft)

Population (2021)
  - Total: 1,000
- Time zone: UTC+6

Bashky-Terek is a village in Jalal-Abad Region of Kyrgyzstan. Its population was 1,000 in 2021.
