= Mount Beshtor =

Mountain in Uzbekistan

Beshtor
- гора Бештор, гора Беш-Тёр
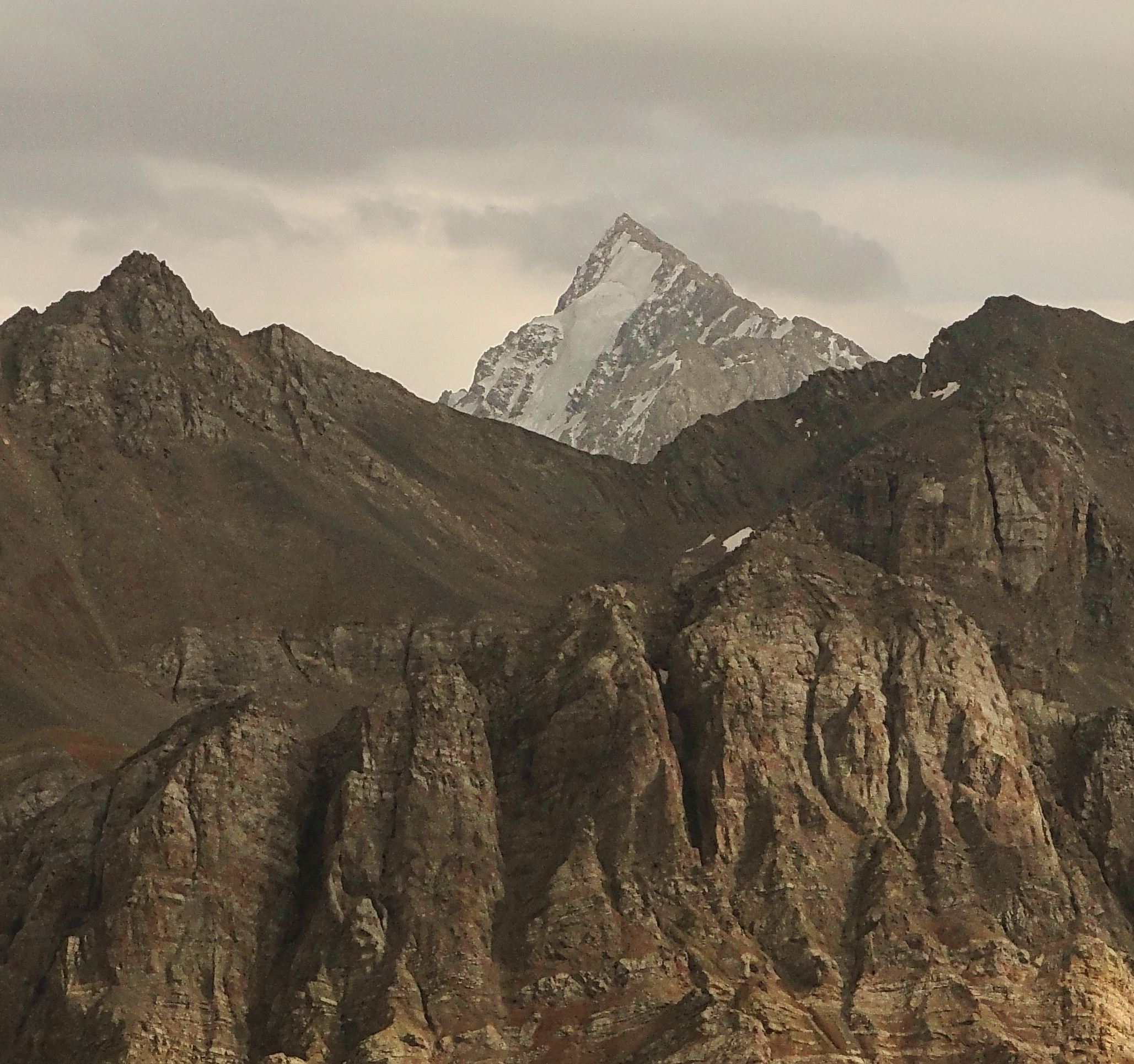

Highest point
- Elevation: 4,299 m (14,104 ft)
- Coordinates: 42°06′N 70°52′E

Geography
- Location within Uzbekistan
- Location: Tashkent, Uzbekistan
- Parent range: Pskem Mountains

Mount Beshtor (Russian: гора Бештор, also Беш-Тёр) rises to 4,299 m in Pskem Range in the north-eastern tip of Uzbekistan's Tashkent Province. Located on the southern border with Kyrgyzstan, a short distance to the south-west from another towering peak in Pskem Range, Mount Adelung (Adelunga Toghi, 4,301 m). Beshtor is the second highest peak in both Tashkent Province and the Pskem Range.
