= Aygyr-Jar =

Aygyr-Jar Айгыр-Жар
- Location within Kyrgyzstan
- Coordinates: 41°43′48″N 70°58′48″E
- Country: Kyrgyzstan
- Region: Jalal-Abad Region
- District: Chatkal District
- Elevation: 1,609 m (5,279 ft)

Population (2021)
  - Total: 3,629
- Time zone: UTC+6

Aygyr-Jar is a village in Jalal-Abad Region of Kyrgyzstan. Its population was 3,629 in 2021.
