= Jangy-Bazar, Jalal-Abad =

Jangy-Bazar
- Location within Kyrgyzstan
- Coordinates: 41°54′36″N 71°21′36″E
- Country: Kyrgyzstan
- Region: Jalal-Abad Region
- District: Chatkal District
- Elevation: 2,070 m (6,790 ft)

Population (2021)
  - Total: 2,930
- Time zone: UTC+6

Jangy-Bazar (Kyrgyz: Жаңы-Базар, Russian: Джаны-Базар) is a village in Jalal-Abad Region of Kyrgyzstan. Its population was 2,930 in 2021.
