= Gelon (settlement) =

Gelon Ғелон
- Location in Uzbekistan
- Coordinates: 39°04′N 67°27′E
- Country: Uzbekistan
- Region: Qashqadaryo Region
- Inception: 1305

Population (2019)
  - Total: 5 834
- Area code: (+998) 75

Gelón ( Uzbek. Gelon / Gelon ) is an urban-type settlement in the Shakhrisabz district of the Qashqadaryo Region of the Republic of Uzbekistan.

The kishlak was founded in 1305. Its inhabitants still preserve ancient customs and a way of life. Until mid-2018, foreign tourists could not visit this village due to the special border regime.

== Geography ==
Gelon is located in the southern part of Uzbekistan in the Qashqadaryo, on the western slope of the Pamir-Alai Mountains.

The territory is located on the border of Uzbekistan and Tajikistan, 80 kilometers from Shakhrisabz. The kishlak is surrounded on all sides by high mountains, reaching an altitude of more than 4000 meters in the east. This is one of the highest mountain villages in Uzbekistan. It is not easy to get here along a difficult but picturesque mountain dirt road with numerous serpentines.

== Climate ==
The climate is continental, dry, and in some places subtropical.

== Population ==
The population of the village is 5834 people (2019).

Ethnic composition: Tajiks - 5831 people, Uzbeks - 3 people. (as of December 12, 2019).

== Sights ==
There is a mountain near the village, which bears the name "Hazrati Sultan," as well as "Hisorak Suv Ombori," which is a popular place among tourists.
