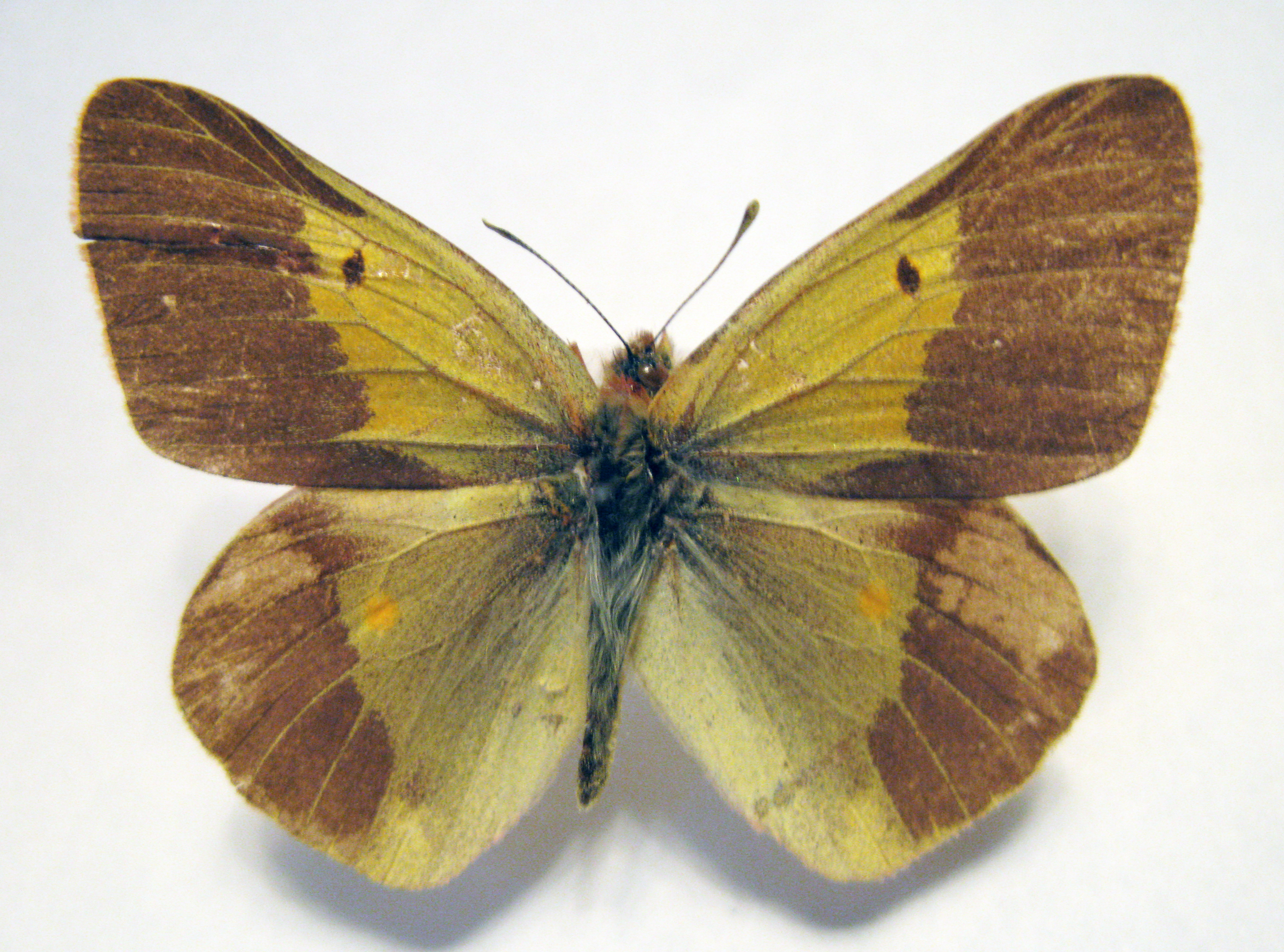

Scientific classification
- Kingdom: Animalia
- Phylum: Arthropoda
- Clade: Pancrustacea
- Class: Insecta
- Order: Lepidoptera
- Family: Pieridae
- Genus: Colias
- Species: C. wiskotti

Binomial name
- Colias wiskotti Staudinger, 1882

Synonyms
- Colias leuca Staudinger, 1882; Colias palaenoides Verity, 1909; Colias leucotheme Grum-Grshimailo, 1890; Colias wiskotti var. aurantiaca Staudinger, [1892]; Colias draconis Grum-Grshimailo, 1891

= Colias wiskotti =

Species of butterfly

Colias wiskotti is a butterfly in the family Pieridae. It is found in Turkestan, Uzbekistan, Afghanistan, Tajikistan, and Kashmir. The habitat consists of xerophytic mountains.

It is a highly polymorphous species with a lot of varieties or forms described. Adults are on wing from June to August.

The larvae feed on Acantolimon, Oxytropis, and Onobrychis echidna.

== Subspecies ==
The following subspecies are recognised:

- C. w. wiskotti (western Ghissar)
- C. w. sagina Austaut, 1891 (eastern Ghissar, Darvaz)
- C. w. separata Grum-Grshimailo, 1888 (Alaisky Mountains)
- C. w. aurea Kotzsch, 1937 (western Pamirs)
- C. w. draconis Grum-Grshimailo, 1891 (western Tian-Shan)
- C. w. sweadneri Clench & Shoumatoff, 1956 (Afghanistan)

== Gallery ==
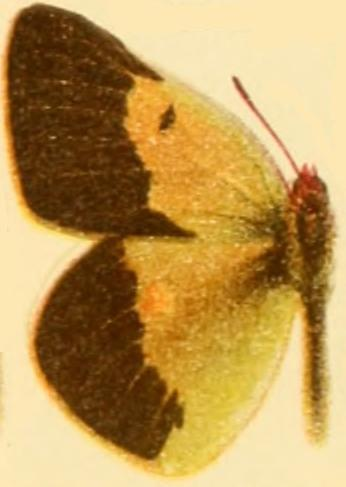
C. w. wiskotti male

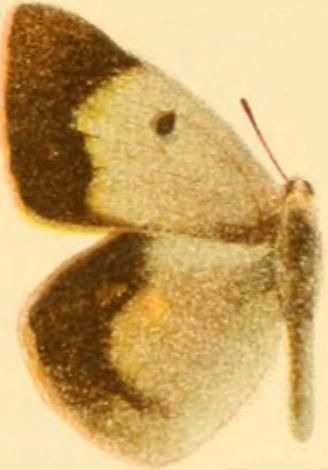
C. w. wiskotti female

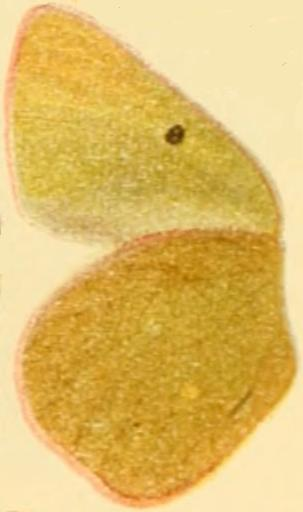
C. w. wiskotti underside

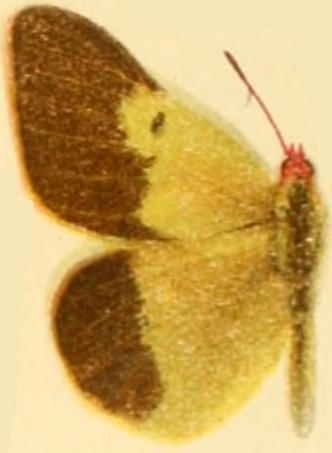
C. w. separata

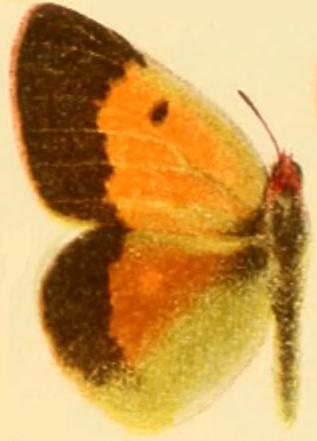
C. w. draconis male

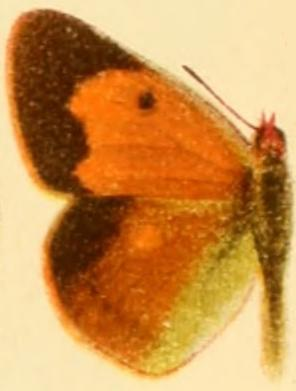
C. w. draconis female
