= Pskem Mountains =

Mountain range on the Kyrgyzstan–Uzbekistan border

- Piskom Mountains
- Location of the Pskem Mountains in Kyrgyzstan Location of the Pskem Mountains in Uzbekistan

Highest point
- Peak: Mount Beshtor
- Elevation: 4,395 m (14,419 ft)

Dimensions
- Length: 141 km (88 mi) northeast–southwest
- Width: 20 km (12 mi)

Naming
- Native name: Пскем кырка тоосу (Kyrgyz)

Geography
- Countries: Kyrgyzstan; Uzbekistan
- Range coordinates: 41°50′N 70°40′E
- Parent range: Tian Shan

The Pskem Mountains, also known as the Pskem Range or Piskom Mountains (Kyrgyz: Пскем кырка тоосу; Russian: Пскемский хребет), are a mountain range in the western Tian Shan, along the border between Kyrgyzstan and Uzbekistan. The range extends approximately 141 kilometres (88 mi) and is about 20 kilometres (12 mi) wide. Its highest point is Mount Beshtor, with a reported elevation of 4,395 metres (14,419 ft). (Note: Published summit elevations differ. The geographical encyclopedia of Kyrgyzstan gives Beshtor as 4,395 metres (14,419 ft) and identifies it as the highest point of the range. The Great Soviet Encyclopedia gives Beshtor as 4,299 metres (14,104 ft), while a physical map of Tashkent Region marks nearby Mount Adelung at 4,301 metres (14,111 ft).)

== Geography ==
The range extends southwestwards between the Pskem, Chatkal and Chandalash rivers. Its northern part is higher, with prevailing elevations of 3,800–4,000 metres (12,500–13,100 ft). The crest is predominantly steep and rocky, and glaciers occur in the high northern section around Beshtor.

The slopes generally reach angles of 40–45° and are dissected by short ravines and gorges. South of Ayuutör Peak (4,025 metres (13,205 ft)), the range divides into two branches separated by the Koksu, a right tributary of the Chatkal. The eastern branch is known as the Koksu Range and the western branch retains the name Pskem.

Numerous tributaries of the Pskem and Chatkal originate on the slopes of the range.

== Geology ==
The high northern section consists of an approximately 500-metre (1,600 ft) succession of Upper Ordovician grey-green sandstone, porphyritic diabase and shale, together with Middle Devonian red sandstone, gritstone, conglomerate, shale and limestone. Early Paleozoic granite and granodiorite intrusions occur locally.

The lower southern section contains Carboniferous dolomite, dolomitized limestone and siliceous rocks. Within Uzbekistan, these give way to Lower Paleozoic granite, granodiorite and other rocks. The rock formations have been folded and deformed and are cut by faults trending south and southeast. Mineral deposits include titanium, vanadium and manganese.

== Vegetation and land use ==
Vegetation changes with elevation. Steppe and meadow steppe occur at approximately 2,200–2,300 metres (7,200–7,500 ft), followed by tall-herb meadows and shrubby woodland at 2,300–2,700 metres (7,500–8,900 ft). Meadows and meadow steppe occupy elevations of 2,700–3,000 metres (8,900–9,800 ft). Higher elevations support subalpine and alpine meadows, followed by subnival cold-desert and glacial–nival landscapes.

Open juniper woodland, poplar stands and shrub vegetation occur on the lower slopes and in river valleys. The range is used for haymaking, grazing and forestry.
