= Terek-Say =

Terek-Say Терек-Сай
- Location within Kyrgyzstan
- Coordinates: 41°30′0″N 71°10′48″E
- Country: Kyrgyzstan
- Region: Jalal-Abad Region
- District: Chatkal District
- Terek Say: 1950
- Elevation: 1,873 m (6,145 ft)

Population (2021)
  - Total: 3,708
- Time zone: UTC+6

Terek-Say (Kyrgyz: Терек-Сай) is a village (legally an urban-type settlement from 1950 to 2012) in Jalal-Abad Region of Kyrgyzstan, established in 1950 along with the commissioning of the Terek-Say antimony mine. Its population was 3,708 in 2021. It is located at an altitude of 1700 meters above sea level on the main highway about 30 km west northwest of Ala-Buka. In Soviet times, the activity of the settlement was dependent on the mine and the Chatkal Geological Expedition. With the dissolution of the Soviet Union in 1991, mine production sharply declined due to severance of economic ties, the abandonment of inventory and logistics management, and the fall in antimony prices. It resulted in the outflow of skilled labor, and in the decay of housing and utilities infrastructure.

== Population ==
Historical population
Year	Pop.	±% p.a.
1970	2,128	—
1979	1,954	−0.94%
1989	2,716	+3.35%
1999	2,451	−1.02%
2009	2,418	−0.14%
2021	3,708	+3.63%
Note: resident population; Sources:

== Climate ==
The climate is continental with winter extreme temperatures of -35 to -40 and summer temperatures from +25 to +30. The snow cover is typically from October to May. The depth of soil freezing is up to 1 meter.
