= Shekaftar =

Shekaftar Шекафтар
- Location within Kyrgyzstan
- Coordinates: 41°12′36″N 71°18′36″E
- Country: Kyrgyzstan
- Region: Jalal-Abad
- District: Chatkal
- Elevation: 1,082 m (3,550 ft)

Population (2021)
  - Total: 2,217
- Time zone: UTC+6

Shekaftar (Kyrgyz: Шекафтар) is a village in the south of Jalal-Abad Region, Kyrgyzstan. It is part of Chatkal District. Its population was 2,217 in 2021. It lies about 10 kilometres (6.2 mi) from the border with Uzbekistan. A uranium mine was located in Shekaftar between 1946 and 1968; the mine was operated by the Sumsar company from 1958 until its deactivation. In 1997, it was reported that a total of eight radioactive waste dumps had been made near Shekaftar.
