= Chatkal =

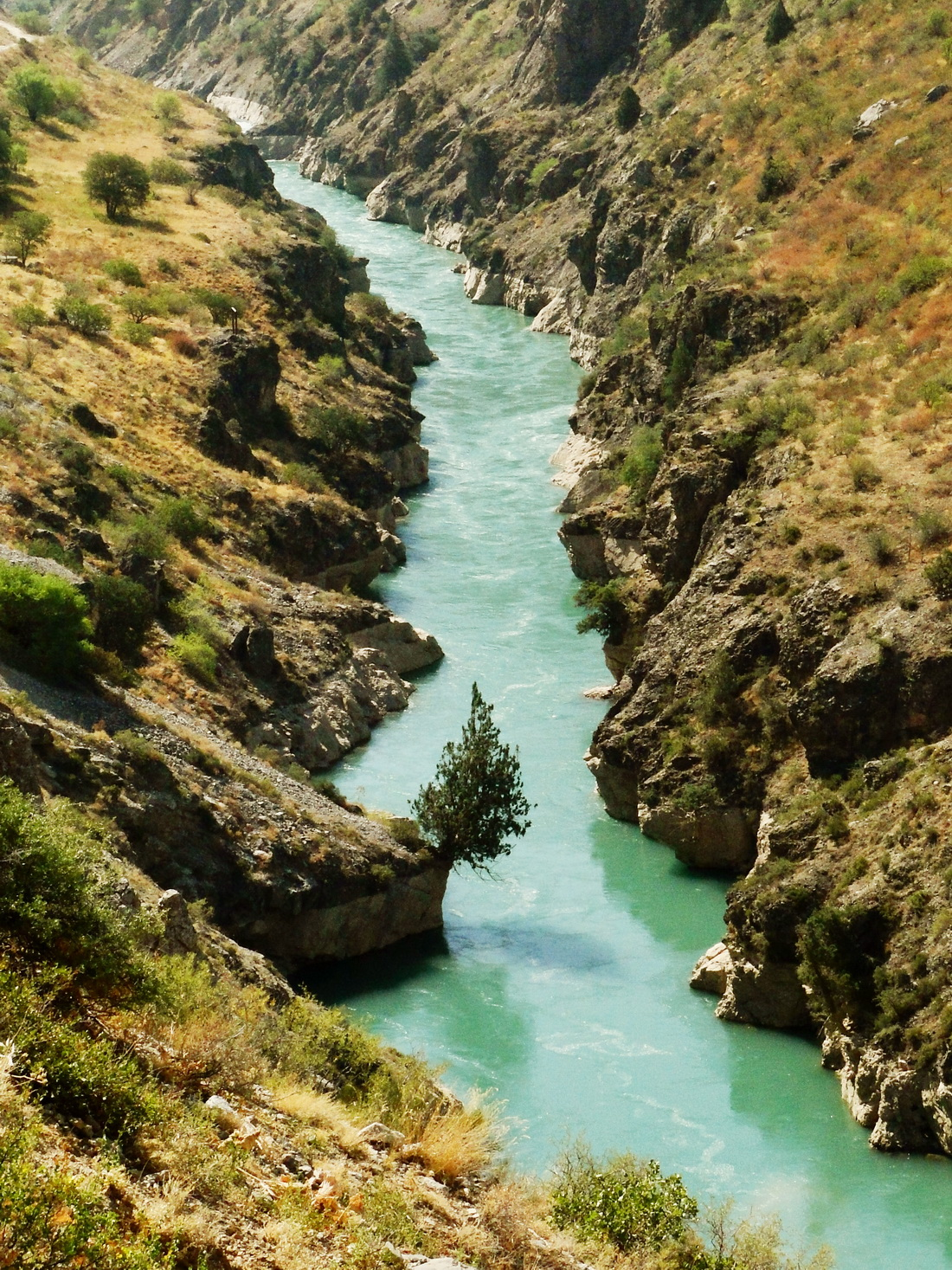
- Native name: Чаткал (Russian)

Location
- Country: Kyrgyzstan, Uzbekistan

Physical characteristics
- Mouth: Chirchiq
  - location: Lake Charvak
  - coordinates: 41°35′08″N 70°05′57″E
- Length: 223 km (139 mi)
- Basin size: 7,110 km^{2} (2,750 sq mi)

Basin features
- Progression: Chirchiq→ Syr Darya→ North Aral Sea
- Tributaries
  - left: Tüz-Ashuu, Ters, Oqbuloq
  - right: Chandalash

The Chatkal (Russian: Чаткал) is a river of Jalal-Abad Region, Kyrgyzstan and Tashkent Region in Uzbekistan. It is the left source river of the Chirchiq in the Syr Darya basin. In its upper course it is called Karakulja.

The length of the river is 223 kilometres (139 mi), with a basin area of 7,110 square kilometres (2,750 mi^{2}). It originates at the point where Chatkal Range adjoins Talas Ala-Too Range. Its largest tributaries are the Aksuu, Kokuybel, Avletim, Ters and Nayza (Oqbuloq) from the left, and the Karakysmak, Beshterek, Chandalash and Köksuu from the right.

The average rate of water flow near the mouth is 122 cubic metres per second (4,300 cu ft/s), with a maximum 920 cubic metres per second (32,000 cu ft/s).
