= Chatkal Range =

Mountain range in Kyrgyzstan and Uzbekistan

- Location within Kyrgyzstan Location within Uzbekistan

Highest point
- Peak: Avletim Peak
- Elevation: 4,503 m (14,774 ft)

Dimensions
- Length: 225 km (140 mi) NE-SW
- Width: 30 km (19 mi) NW-SE

Naming
- Native name: Чаткал тоо кыркасы (Kyrgyz); Chatqol tizmasi (Uzbek)

Geography
- Countries: Kyrgyzstan and Uzbekistan
- Range coordinates: 41°23′38″N 70°29′16″E

Geology
- Rock type(s): Limestone of Lower Carboniferous and Upper Devonian (axial line)

Chatkal Range is a range in the Western Tian Shan that borders Ferghana Valley from northwest. It departs from Talas range and spreads out to south-west to the right bank of Angren (river). The length of the range is 225 km (140 mi), and it is up to 30 km (19 mi) wide. The highest elevations of the Chatkal Range are located in its north-east part. The ridge is crowned by pointed peaks with elevations of 4,300 to 4,500 m (14,100 to 14,800 ft) with Avletim peak - 4,503 m (14,774 ft) being the highest point. Between peaks are saddles and mountain passes: Avletim - 3,447 m (11,309 ft), Shaar - 3,809 m (12,497 ft), Semiz-Bel - 3,570 m (11,710 ft), Chanach - 3,401 m (11,158 ft), Tush-Atu - 3,595 m (11,795 ft), Chapchyma - 2,841 m (9,321 ft), and Chaykyldy - 3,264 m (10,709 ft). Northern slopes are steep and short, while southern ones are gentle. The range is composed by primarily of limestone, granite, and schist. The axial line of the range is composed of limestone of Lower Carboniferous and Upper Devonian.
