= Derbisek =

Derbisek (Kazakh) Дербісек ауыл (awıl) Russian Empire: Konstantinovskoe and Kaufmanskoe Soviet Central Asia: Tobolino and Kirovo
- village
- Location within Kazakhstan
- Coordinates (Derbisek): 41°33′39″N 69°20′16″E
- Kazakhstan: Turkistan Region

Population
  - Total: 11,234 people (2,009)
- Time zone: UTC+6:00
- Postal code: 160912
- Area code: +7 72537
- KATO code: 515451100

Derbisek (Russian: Дербисек) is an aul, or village, in the Saryagash District of the Turkistan Region of Kazakhstan. The administrative center of the Derbisek rural district. It is located about 16 km northeast of the regional center, the city of Saryagash. General location 130 km (81 mi) to Shymkent (Kazakhstan) and 20 km (12 mi) from Tashkent (Uzbekistan).

== History ==
The settlements in Tashkent district, Syr-Darya region, Turkestan province of the Russian Empire were founded at the end of the 19th century in Keles river valley between hilly terrain, several ravines, partly cultivated for cotton and wheat, partly deserted due to lack of irrigation water. The settlements were named after Konstantin Petrovich von Kaufmann, the first Governor-General of Russian Turkestan. The Syr-Darya region had 47 villages with 16,000 settlers from the Russian Empire.

Most detailed description of early history of the settlers were left by Ivan Ivanovich Geyer (1860 - 1908) - Russian historian and ethnographer in Central Asia, vice-governor of the Syrdarya region. State Councillor.

In 1891 the village of Konstantinovskoye (known as Konstantinovka) was the first to appear 34 versts north of Tashkent and comprised German settlers, immigrants from Samara Governorate who were:

moved from the Samara province after a series of crop failures and last year's famine

— Geyer (1893), newspaper "Turkestanskiye Vedomosti" (in Russian), In the Russian villages of the Syr-Darya region. (Letters from the road). Letter I. Chimkent district

In 1892 1.5 versts from Konstantinovskoe to the left of the postal route was settled the village of Kaufmanskoye consisted of Russian settlers who were:

driven by lack of land, poverty and hunger, the peasants of the indigenous Russian provinces

— Geyer (1893), newspaper "Turkestanskiye Vedomosti" (in Russian), In the Russian villages of the Syr-Darya region. (Letters from the road). Letter I. Chimkent district

Muddy yellow waters at that time were coming from Khanym-aryk, which is the first, after Iskander-aryk, a serious irrigation facility undertaken on the initiative and at the expense of the Russians:

Judging by the traces of old ditches scattered throughout this area, it must be assumed that the real restoration of Khanym-aryk is only a partial restoration of the ancient irrigation system that once fed thousands of people, and this same gives full grounds for believing in the bright future of both described villages.

— Geyer (1893), newspaper "Turkestanskiye Vedomosti" (in Russian), In the Russian villages of the Syr-Darya region. (Letters from the road). Letter I. Chimkent district

The first settlers of the village were: K. Weber - opened a locksmith shop, Albert Johannes, Christoph Gelver, Johann Grey, Heinrich Kufeld, Andrey Lorentz, Karl Lorentz, Joseph Resch and Dr. G. Miller opened a blacksmith and metalwork shop in the village, where he worked himself, and one of the first Seventh-day Adventist families in the region, the Betram family built a well-known roller flour mill in the area.

With establishment Turkestan Autonomous Soviet Socialist Republic settlements were renamed. Kaufmanskoye become Kirovo after Sergei Kirov and in 1917 Konstantinovka become Tobolino after Ivan Osipovich Tobolin (1885–1941) executive Secretary of the Central Committee of the Communist Party of Turkestan. Tobolino was center Akzharskaya county for Tashkazak district (Tashkent-Kazak district) of Syrdarya province of the Kirghiz and Kazak ASSR, which existed in 1924–1928.

In 1993 the villages of Kirovo and Tobolino were merged into Derbisek aul. (Kazakh) Дербісек means derby.

From 1959 to 1994 it was the center of Lenin's cotton collective.

Production cooperatives and farms "Koktobe", "Ainabek", "Akkum" were established in the village. There are schools, hospitals, consumer services, clubs and other institutions.

== Population ==
In 1891 Konstantinovskoe (Tobolino) comprised 107 households, 1893 - 97 households, in 1910 - 124 households

In 1892 Kaufmanskoe (Kirovo) comprised 92 households, 1893 - 50 households.

In 1929 there were 1,600 people in Konstantinovskoye (Tobolino): 1,100 Lutherans, 300 reformers, 200 Catholics.

Number of people were victims of political terror in the USSR.

1891	1892	1910	1929	1999	2009
Konstantinovskoye	Kaufmanskoye	Konstantinovskoye	Konstantinovskoye	Derbisek aul	Derbisek aul
572	450	825	1600	9,709	11,234

== Attractions ==
Tserkov' Pokrova Presvyatoy Bogoroditsy (Church of the Intercession of the Holy Mother of God) was erected in Kaufmanskoye from 1880 to 1915, architect Alexey Leontievitch Benois (1838–1902). Latest records reference the priest of the church Vasily Skvortsev according to the petition from September 1, 1917, moved, Alexei Filippova, according to the petition, from September 1, 1917, appointed the rector of the Church.

In Soviet times, the church was empty, after the collapse of the USSR, too. Currently not maintained. Residents of Derbisek say that once they wanted to demolish the temple, they drove a tractor to the place. The crosses on the domes squinted, when the wind blows, the low sound of creaking metal chains is heard here. But the technique did not cope - the walls turned out to be strong and did not succumb to destruction. The façade is well preserved, the walls survived, the rich brick décor makes it elegant with whimsical complex silhouette of three-domed bell tower.
