= Keles (disambiguation) =

Keles may refer to:

== Geography ==
- Keles, a town in Bursa Province, Turkey
- Keles (river), in Kazakhstan and Uzbekistan
- Keles, Uzbekistan, a town in Tashkent Province

== People ==
- Keleş, a list of people with the Turkish surname Keleş or Keles
