= Battle of Tashkent (1586) =

Battle between the Kazakh Khanate and the Khanate of Bukhara

- Part of the Kazakh–Uzbek Wars
Date	c. 1586
Location	Tashkent, Uzbekistan
Result	Kazakh victory
Territorial changes	Kazakhs failed to take Tashkent, but annexed a number of cities in Turkestan

Belligerents
Kazakh Khanate	Khanate of Bukhara

Commanders and leaders
(Kazakh Khanate) Tawakkul Khan	(Khanate of Bukhara) Dostyum Bey (surrendered)

The Battle of Tashkent (1586) was a military battle between the Kazakh Khanate led Tauekel Khan against the Khanate of Bukhara's militia residing on Tashkent.

== Background to conflict ==
However, in 1583, during a joint campaign to Fergana, relations between Abdullah Khan and Tauekel soured. In May 1583, Tauekel participated in a battle on the side of Abdullah Khan II, where he captured Abdullah's relative, Mehdi Sultan, along with Baba Sultan's son, Abd al-Ghaffar, and put them both to death. Tauekel believed he would be rewarded for bringing their heads to Abdullah Khan, just as he had been rewarded for the head of Baba Sultan. But Abdullah was extremely displeased. While Baba Sultan had been killed in open combat, this time Tauekel had executed two captives. Receiving no praise, Tauekel departed for the Kipchak steppes to await an opportunity for revenge.

Alternatively, as early as the beginning of 1583, while returning from the campaign against Andijan and Fergana, Tauekel suspected the ruler of hostility and left for the Desht-i-Kipchak. Although sources do not explicitly state the reasons for this move, Abuseitova reached several conclusions. Abdullah had taken the throne not by right of inheritance, but through force and diplomacy, eliminating all competitors—often using Tauekel’s own hands to do so. Once Abdullah unified Mawarannahr, Tauekel’s own position became dangerous. As a Jochid, he also had a potential claim to power in the region, a fact confirmed by the events of 1598. His fears were justified. Additionally, Abdullah may have failed to fulfill a promise to hand over four cities in Turkestan to the Kazakhs following the victory over their enemies.

== Situation on eve of battle ==
According to the source, Tauekel, who ruled over 200,000 families, fled to Tashkent (then ruled by Nawruz Ahmed Khan) following an Oirat offensive. However, a chronological contradiction arises: Nawruz Ahmed died in 1556, while Tauekel ascended the throne only after 1583. Historian T. I. Sultanov suggests that the text mentions another ruler (either Buydash or Haqq-Nazar) under the name of Tauekel, and that the events themselves date back to the 1550s. On the other hand, Sabitov believes that Seyfi Chelebi was describing the year 1586, when Tauekel was already Khan and did indeed invade Tashkent. Thus, the campaign against Tashkent in 1586 was provoked by a retaliatory strike from the Oirats. Following the Oirat attack, a segment of the Kazakhs led by Tauekel retreated south toward Tashkent.

== Battle ==
In 1586, Tauekel took advantage of the fact that Abdullah Khan's main forces were concentrated in the south of the state. He organized an offensive against the northern regions of Mawarannahr, creating a direct threat to Turkestan, Tashkent, and even Samarkand. Thanks to the Khan's military talent, the Kazakhs managed to win a series of victories and incorporate several cities of the region into their state.

The Kazakh army surrounded Tashkent. A local militia was hastily gathered to defend the city. The opposing forces met in the locality of Sharabkhana. The Kazakhs' equipment was specific: «fur coats and yergaks [hide capes] served them instead of cuirasses and kuyaks [armor]». Seeing this, the people of Tashkent overconfidently attacked without any precaution, but were ultimately completely overwhelmed and utterly defeated. Following the rout of the militia, the danger was immediately reported from Tashkent to Samarkand, to the ruler Ubaydullah Sultan (Abdullah's brother). The appearance of large forces from Samarkand saved the situation. Ubaydullah promptly gathered an army from across the Samarkand lands, crossed the Syr Darya, and entered the Tashkent district.

At that time, Tauekel was located near Sayram. Learning of the approach of a fresh and powerful enemy, he did not dare to engage in a new battle and preferred to withdraw into the steppes. Thus, due to the arriving reinforcements, the Kazakhs failed to take Tashkent, and the Khan's first attempt to seize the city ended in failure.

== Meaning ==
In 1588, a major uprising took place in Tashkent. According to Hafiz-i Tanish, the residents of Tashkent, Shahrukhiya, and Khujand rejected the appointee of Abdallah Khan and called upon the Kazakh Sultan Zhan-Ali (Jan-Ali) to rule. Historians differ in their assessments: T. I. Sultanov considers Tauekel Khan to be the organizer of the mutiny, while M. Kh. Abuseitova maintains a different position. The rebels were also supported by the sons of Haqq-Nazar Khan—Mungatay and Din-Muhammad. Ultimately, the rebellion was suppressed by the Shibanid forces.

== Consequences ==
Khan Tauekel continued the struggle to annex Tashkent and Turkestan to the Kazakh Khanate in order to unify the lands. Historian T. I. Sultanov emphasizes that the Kazakh Khan demonstrated exceptional persistence in achieving his primary foreign policy goal—seizing the cities along the Syr Darya. However, a favorable situation for this did not arise until 1597–1598. In early 1598, he took advantage of the internal strife within the Shaybanid state between Abdullah Khan and his son to organize a military campaign. Abdullah Khan underestimated his opponent's strength and deployed only frontier detachments against the Kazakhs. Thanks to his skillful command, Tauekel defeated the Uzbek army between Samarkand and Tashkent.
