= Polatbay Berdaliyev =

Uzbek rapist and serial killer (born 1986)

- Born: Polatbay Turganbekovich Berdaliyev; September 26, 1986 (age 40); Uzbek SSR
- Conviction: Murder
- Penalty: Life imprisonment

Details
- Victims: 11
- Span of crimes: 2011–2012
- Country: Uzbekistan, Kazakhstan
- States: Tashkent, Shymkent
- Date apprehended: May 2012

Polatbay Turganbekovich Berdaliyev (born 26 September 1986) is an Uzbekistani rapist and serial killer who, along with accomplices Abduseit Ormanov and two other unidentified men, was responsible for killing 11 women in both Uzbekistan and Kazakhstan from 2011 to 2012. Berdaliyev and Ormanov were both sentenced to life imprisonment in both countries, while the other members of their group are still sought after.

== Early life ==
Berdaliyev was considered a quiet, shy and rather unremarkable young man. However, along with his good friend Abduseit Ormanov, he raped his fellow female classmates, who never reported the cases to the police, as Berdaliyev's father was an officer. At one point, he was convicted of robbery in Almaty, receiving a 6-year-sentence to be served in the Shymkent Colony. While in prison, Berdaliyev began corresponding with a woman whom he later married, but the couple separated after he was granted parole in 2010.

Returning to Uzbekistan, he fell in love with another woman, who became his girlfriend. The couple lived together with relatives of Berdaliyev in Astana, as he wanted to introduce her to his parents before their marriage, to which said parents were starkly opposed. Despite this, the persistent Berdaliyev eventually convinced them, and he was allowed to marry the woman.

== Murders ==
=== Modus operandi ===
Constantly reminding himself of the high school rapes, Berdaliyev eventually expressed a desire to "relive" the exciting experiences he had. Grouping together with Abduseit and their mutual friend, the gang began their killing spree. Their modus operandi involved Berdaliyev, who went along well with women, searching for young, single female hitchhikers, pretending to be the driver of a private taxi, a black Mercedes. With the offer of a ride to their destination, Berdaliyev and the victim would enter the car, in which Ormanov and the other accomplices were already seated posing as "clients". They would then drive until they could find a lonely, desolate road. Under the guise of the car breaking down, Berdaliyev would stop the car, with the gang then proceeding to rape and subsequently strangle their victim using scarves, shoelaces, plastic bags, etc. After the deed was done, the deceased would be robbed of all their possessions, with Berdaliyev's share often being gifted to his girlfriend and mother, or sometimes sold at pawn shops.

=== Uzbekistan murders and change of venue ===
The gang, initially operating in Tashkent, managed to get away with the murders of 7 women (two of whom had their corpses burned), still unidentified to this day, before police eventually began taking interest in the case. Fearing that he was being closed in on, Berdaliyev began periodically travelling to the neighbouring Turkistan Region in Kazakhstan, under the pretence of working. He would mainly haunt the Almaty-Shymkent road, killing the victim and then returning home to Uzbekistan the same day.

=== Kazakhstan murders ===
==== Natalya Pashkova ====
The 29-year-old Pashkova (also referred to as "Yekaterina Tishkunova"), accompanied by her 3-year-old daughter and sister, arrived in Shymkent from Karaganda by train on 19 December 2011. At the train station, Natalya's sister and daughter separated from her and travelled towards Arys, while the smiling Pashkova caught a taxi to her home, in the city centre. She was last seen talking with a private taxi driver and boarding his black Mercedes, but never got returned home alive. Two days later, her body was discovered along the Almaty-Termez highway, with signs of a violent struggle. Pashkova had been raped and then strangled with her sneakers' shoelaces. Her belongings, consisting of a suitcase, laptop, gold earrings and 500 tenge, were missing.

All local taxi drivers were interviewed in this case, with some coming forward and saying that they had seen her enter a black Mercedes. However, no arrests were made during the investigation, quickly turning it into a cold case.

==== Assel Buribayeva ====
On 10 February, the 25-year-old Buribayeva (also referred to as "Aliya Dauletbaeva") had left Saryagash by train headed towards Shymkent, informing her husband of her travels by phone. She had arranged to meet her husband and son at the entrance of the city, but to get there, she needed to catch a taxi. After some time, Buribayeva phoned her spouse, saying that the taxi had broken down about 30 kilometres from the city, and that the drivers were taking care of it. Worried, her husband tried to advise her to change cars, but by then, she had already turned off her phone. The husband waited until late at night before going to the police, but just two days later, local residents discovered Assel's body in a steppe near the highway. She had been raped and smothered to death.

==== Saule Isakova ====
The 50-year-old Isakova, a villager from South Kazakhstan, had come from Astana to Shymkent and was last seen catching a ride from the train station, entering a black Mercedes. On 12 March, a shepherd discovered her body. It was determined that Saule had been strangled with her own scarf. In addition, her jewellery, cell phone and about 35,000 tenge were found to be missing.

==== Tamara Asherova ====
Despite knowing that there was somebody killing lonely women, the 54-year-old from the Ordabinskaya District was hurrying home on the eve of 8 March. Having lowered her guard, she accepted a ride from the black Mercedes without a second thought. That same day, her body was found along the highway. Like the Isakova, Asherova had been robbed and subsequently strangled.

== Capture, trial and sentence ==
Feeling the rising pressure from the mounting cases, Kazakhstani authorities immediately began interviewing all the local and foreign taxi drivers, as well as sending notices to the police forces in Uzbekistan, Russia and Kyrgyzstan. Eventually, information from the Uzbek authorities surfaced, claiming that they had monitored a suspect who was in the Jambyl Region. The suspect - Polatbay Berdaliyev, had rented accommodation in Taraz. He was kept under surveillance for two days before he was eventually arrested without resistance. Upon being detained, Berdaliyev almost immediately confessed to all the crimes, also implicating Ormanov and the other accomplices. Shortly after, Abduseit Ormanov himself was arrested by the authorities back in Uzbekistan.

Although he didn't look like a bloodthirsty killer, the investigators were shocked when Berdaliyev described the crime scenes down to the smallest details. A subsequent investigation of his parents' home revealed a handkerchief belonging to one of the victims, which Berdaliyev had given to his mother. Stolen jewellery was also found in the possession of the killer's future wife.

In an attempt to get a shorter sentence, Berdaliyev pretended to have been traumatized and remorseful by his actions, but his bluff was called out by the investigators. Both he and Ormanov were sentenced to life imprisonment for rape, robbery and murder. Berdaliyev was eventually extradited back to his homeland, but the same sentence awaited him there.

== See also ==
- List of serial killers by country
- List of serial killers by number of victims
