= List of international presidential trips made by Shavkat Mirziyoyev =

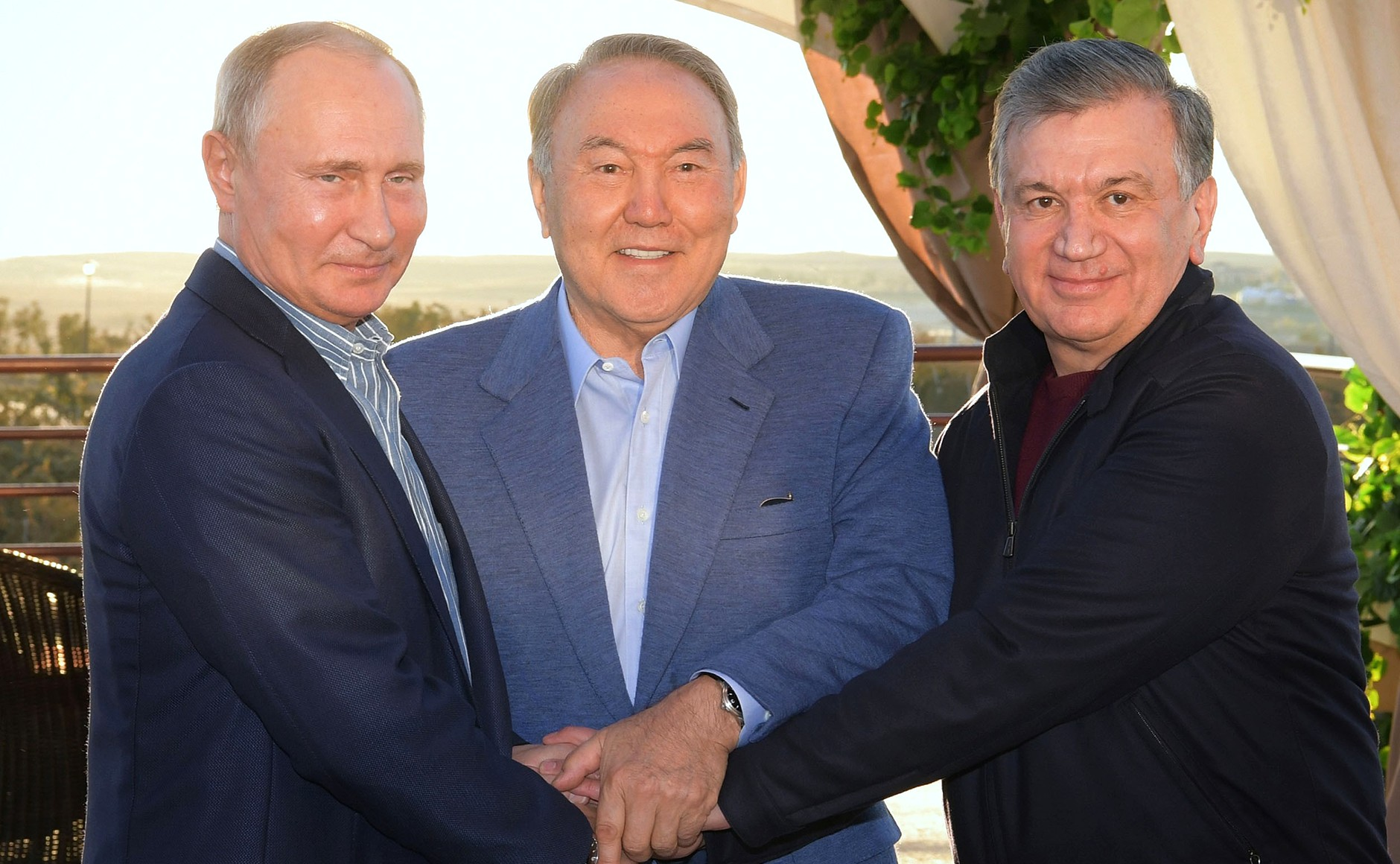
Mirziyoyev with Vladimir Putin and Nursultan Nazarbayev in Saryagash, Kazakhstan, October 20, 2018.

This is a list of international presidential trips made by Shavkat Mirziyoyev, the president of Uzbekistan since 2016.

== 2017 ==
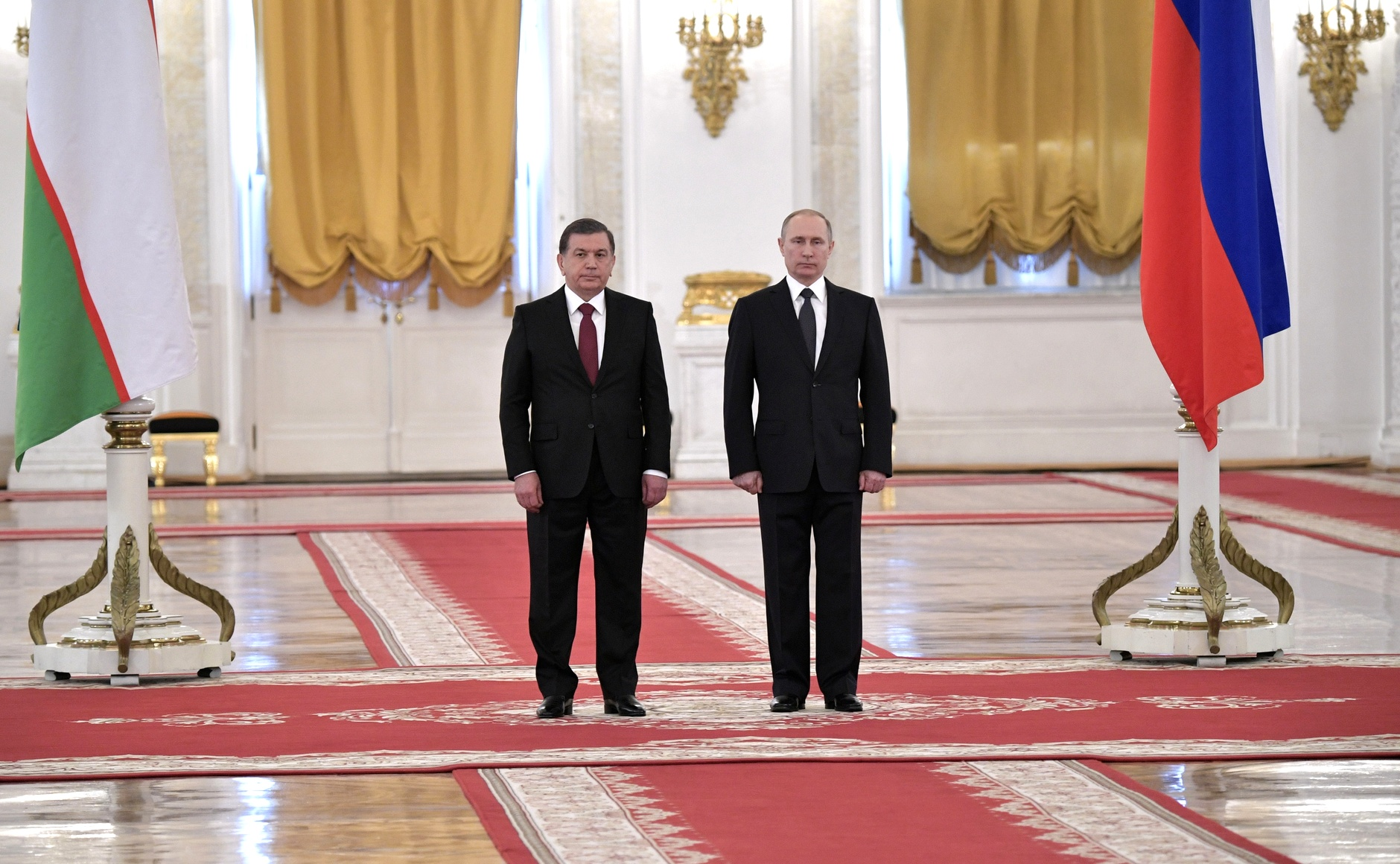
Mirziyoev in Moscow, April 5, 2017.

Country	Areas visited	Date(s)	Notes
Turkmenistan	Ashgabat, Türkmenabat	March 6–7	State Visit. Met with Gurbanguly Berdimuhamedow. Inaugurated a memorial complex in Türkmenabat, and unveiled a bust of Islam Karimov.
Kazakhstan	Astana	March 22–23	State Visit. Met with President Nursultan Nazarbayev.
Russia	Moscow	April 4–5	State Visit. Met with President Vladimir Putin.
Kazakhstan	South Kazakhstan Region	April 29	Working Visit.
China	Beijing	May 10–14	State Visit. Also took part in the "One Belt, One Road" international forum in Beijing. Met Turkish President Recep Tayyip Erdoğan.
Turkmenistan	Ashgabat	May 19–20	Working Visit.
Saudi Arabia	Riyadh	May 20–21	Attended the Arab Islamic American summit. Met Presidents of Azerbaijan, Tajikistan, Kazakhstan, United States, Afghanistan, Prime Minister of Kyrgyzstan, Foreign Minister of Turkey, King of Saudi Arabia.
Kazakhstan	Astana	June 8–9	Attended a session of the Council of the Heads of State of the Shanghai Cooperation Organisation (SCO) and opening of Astana EXPO. Met King of Spain, Presidents of Kyrgyzstan and Afghanistan, Prime Ministers of Pakistan and India.
Kyrgyzstan	Bishkek	September 5–6	Historic State Visit. Signing the package of documents about cooperation and border demarcation. It was the first visit to Kyrgyzstan by an Uzbek president in 17 years.
Kazakhstan	Astana	September 9–10	Attended summit of the Organization of Islamic Cooperation on Science and Technology, EXPO closing ceremony, held bilateral meetings with the Presidents of Turkey, Iran and Afghanistan.
Turkmenistan	Ashgabat	September 17	Attended the opening ceremony of the 5th Asian Indoor and Martial Arts Games, met Presidents of Turkmenistan and Tajikistan.
United States	New York City	September 18–20	Attended the UN General Assembly, met President of Bulgaria, Prime Minister of Georgia, UN Secretary-General, President of World Bank Group, UN High Commissioner for Human Rights, Managing Director of the International Monetary Fund, attended Uzbek-US business forum, met Uzbek citizens living in New York.
Russia	Sochi	October 11	Attended the CIS summit, met Presidents of Russia and Belarus.
Turkey	Ankara, Istanbul	October 25–27	State Visit.
South Korea	Seoul	November 22–25	State Visit.
Russia	Moscow	December 26	Working visit, attending the Informal meeting of the CIS Heads of State.

== 2018 ==
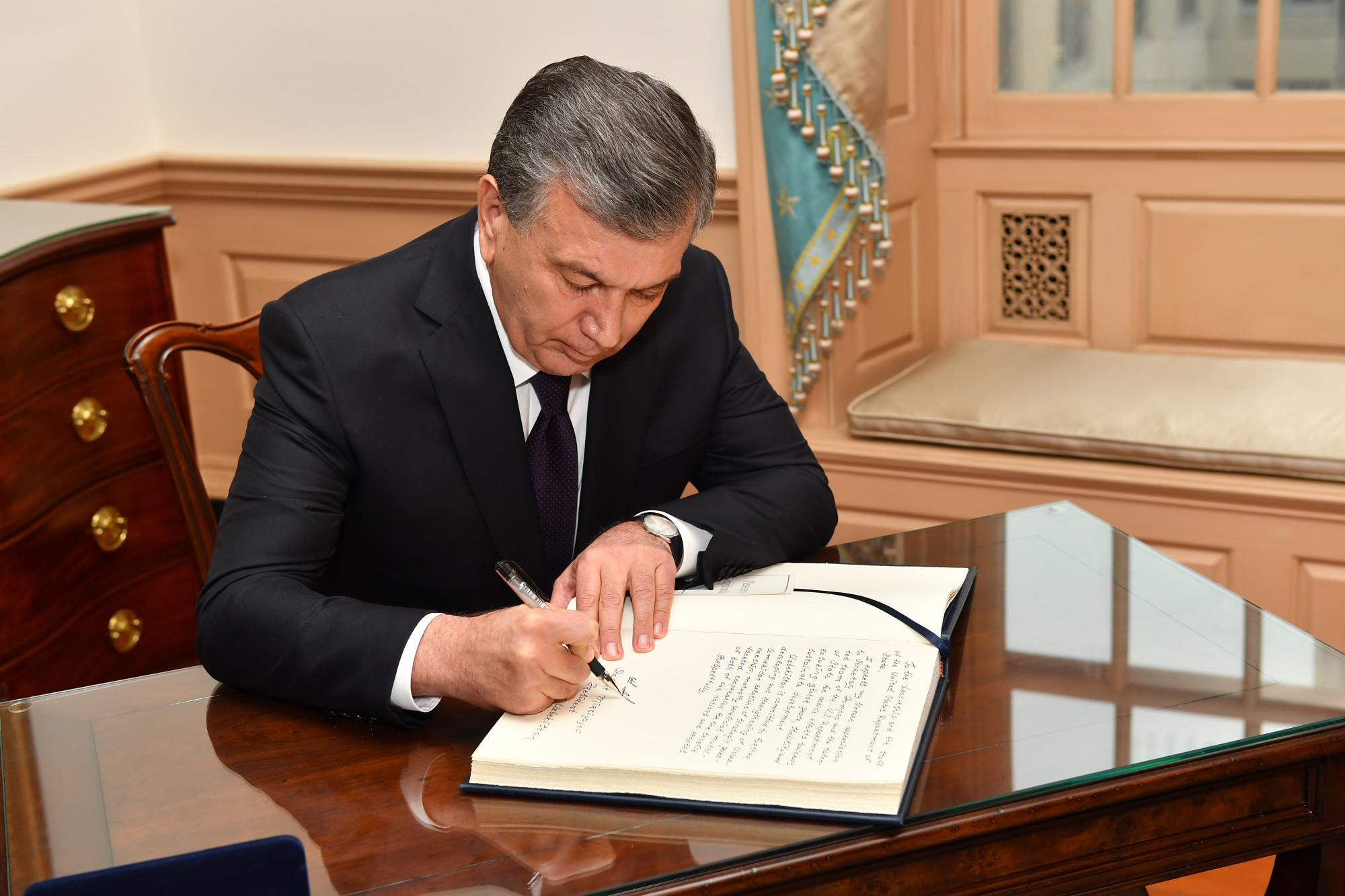
Mirziyoyev signing the guest book before meeting with U.S. Secretary of State Mike Pompeo at the State Department, May 17, 2018.

Country	Areas visited	Date(s)	Notes
Tajikistan	Dushanbe	March 9–10	State Visit.
Kazakhstan	Astana	March 15	Working Visit. Attended a summit of the heads of five Central Asian countries.
United States	Washington, D.C.	May 15–17	Official Visit, met Donald Trump, Mike Pompeo, held meetings in Congress and Pentagon.
China	Qingdao	June 9–10	Attended the SCO Summit, met leaders of China, Russia, India, Pakistan, Afghanistan and First deputy of the UN Secretary-General.
Russia	Moscow	June 14	Attended the opening ceremony of the 2018 FIFA World Cup.
Kazakhstan	Astana	July 5–6	Working visit.
Turkmenistan	Ashgabat	August 24	Working Visit, Aral Sea Summit.
Kyrgyzstan	Cholpon-Ata	September 3–4	Working Visit.
Tajikistan	Dushanbe	September 27–28	Working Visit.
India	New Delhi, Agra	September 30 – October 1	State Visit.
France	Paris	October 8–9	State Visit.
Kazakhstan	Saryagash	October 20	Working Visit.
Russia	St. Petersburg	December 6	Working Visit.

== 2019 ==
Country	Areas visited	Date(s)	Notes
India	Gujarat	January 18	Working Visit.
Germany	Munich; Berlin	January 20–22	State Visit.
United Arab Emirates	Abu Dhabi	March 25–26	State Visit.
China	Beijing	April 24–27	Attended the Belt and Road Summit, met leaders of China, Tajikistan, the IMF, and the UN Secretary-General.
Kyrgyzstan	Bishkek	June 14–15	Scheduled to attend the SCO summit.
Tajikistan	Dushanbe	June 15	Attended CICA summit, met Presidents of Bangladesh and Turkey.
Belarus	Minsk	August 1	State Visit.
Turkmenistan	Ashgabat	October 11	Attended the CIS summit, met Presidents of Turkmenistan, Tajikistan, Moldova and Prime Minister of Armenia.
Azerbaijan	Baku	October 14–15	Attended the summit of the Turkic speaking countries, met Presidents of Azerbaijan, Turkey, Prime Minister of Hungary and First President of Kazakhstan.
Japan	Tokyo	December 17–20	State Visit.
Russia	St. Petersburg	December 20	Working Visit.

== 2020 ==
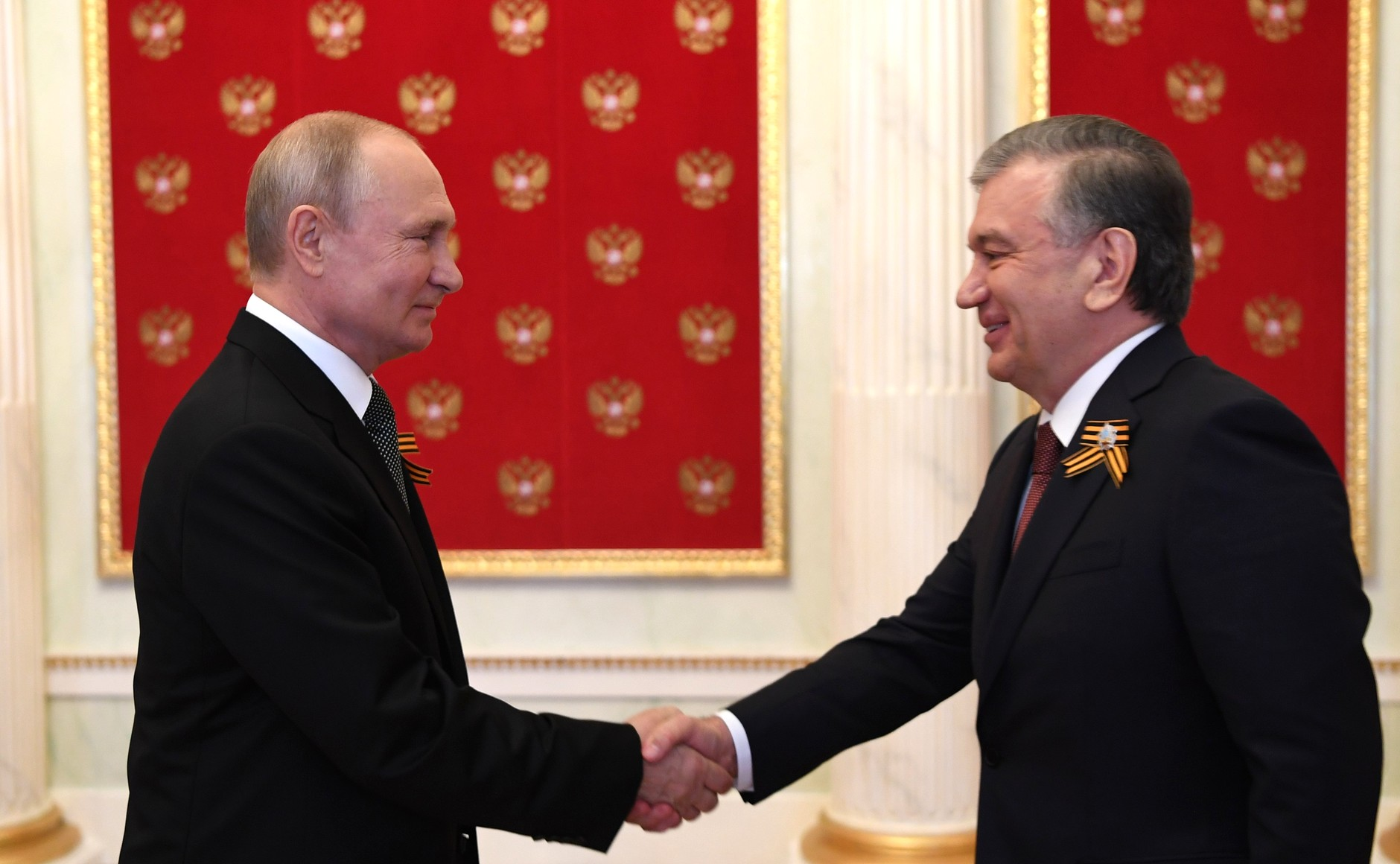
Mirziyoyev meeting with Vladimir Putin prior to the 2020 Moscow Victory Day Parade.

Country	Areas visited	Date(s)	Notes
Turkey	Ankara	February 19–20	Official Visit.
Russia	Moscow	June 24	Public visit. 2020 Moscow Victory Day Parade.

== 2021 ==
Country	Areas visited	Date(s)	Notes
Turkmenistan	Ashgabat and Gypjak	April 29	Working and private visit. Bilateral relations were discussed, Turkmenbashi's Mausoleum visited, and Berdimuhamedov's condolences were expressed in connection with the recent death of his father. A solemn iftar was made.
Tajikistan	Dushanbe and Sughd Vilayat	June 9–10	Official visit.
Turkmenistan	Türkmenbaşy and Awaza	August 5–6	Working visit. Participation in the Summit of the Heads of State of Central Asia.
Turkey	Istanbul	November 11–13	Working visit. Participation in the Organization of Turkic States. Met Presidents of Turkey and Kyrgyzstan.
Russia	Moscow	November 19	Working visit.
Turkmenistan	Ashgabat	November 28	Working Visit. Participating in the 15th Summit of the Economic Cooperation Organization, met Presidents of Turkmenistan, Tajikistan, Pakistan and Iran.
Kazakhstan	Nur-Sultan	December 5–6	State visit.
South Korea	Seoul	December 16–17	State visit.
Russia	Saint Petersburg	December 28–29	Working Visit. Participating in the unofficial CIS Summit.

== 2022 ==
Country	Areas visited	Date(s)	Notes
China	Beijing	February 4–5	Working and Public Visit. Participating in the 2022 Winter Olympics opening ceremony.
Pakistan	Islamabad	March 3–4	State Visit.
United Arab Emirates	Abu-Dhabi	May 15	Working visit.
Kyrgyzstan	Cholpon-Ata	July 21	Working visit.
Saudi Arabia	Jeddah, Medina, Mecca	August 17–18	State visit.
Hungary	Budapest	October 3–4	State visit.
Russia	Saint Petersburg	October 7	Working visit.
Kazakhstan	Astana	October 12–14	Working visit.
Turkmenistan	Ashgabat	October 20–21	State visit.
Kazakhstan	Astana	October 27	Working visit.
France	Paris	November 21–22	Official visit.
Russia	Saint Petersburg	December 26–27	Working visit.

== 2023 ==
Country	Areas visited	Date(s)	Notes
Singapore	Singapore	January 17	State visit.
Kyrgyzstan	Bishkek	January 26-27	State visit.
Egypt	Cairo	February 20-21	Official visit.
Azerbaijan	Baku	March 1-2	Working visit.
Kazakhstan	Shymkent	March 3	Working visit.
Turkey	Ankara	March 15-17	Working visit.
Germany	Berlin	May 2-3	Official visit
Russia	Moscow	May 8-9	Working visit
China	Xi'an	May 18-19	State visit
Kyrgyzstan	Cholpon-Ata	June 2	Working visit
Turkey	Ankara	June 3	Working visit. Attending the inauguration of Turkish President Erdoğan.
Italy	Rome, Milan	June 7-9	Official visit
Iran	Tehran	June 18	State visit
Saudi Arabia	Jeddah	Jule 18-19	Official visit
Turkmenistan	Ashgabat	August 4	Working visit
Hungary	Budapest	August 19-20	Official visit
Azerbaijan	Baku	August 22-23	State visit
Tajikistan	Dushanbe	September 14-15	Working visit
USA	New-York	September 17-21	Working visit
Germany	Berlin	September 28-30	Working visit
Qatar	Doha	October 1-2	State visit
Russia	Tatarstan (Kazan), Moscow	October 5-7	Official visit
Kyrgyzstan	Bishkek	October 13	Working visit
China	Beijing	October 17-18	Working visit
Kazakhstan	Astana	November 2-3	Working visit
Azerbaijan	Baku	November 23-24	Working visit
United Arab Emirates	Dubai	November 30–December 2	Working visit, held meetings with the King of Malaysia, Prime Minister of India, Presidents of Indonesia, Mongolia and Turkey.
Russia	Saint Petersburg	December 25-26	Working visit

== 2024 ==
Country	Areas visited	Date(s)	Notes
China	Beijing	January 23-25	State visit
Russia	Kazan	February 21	Working visit
Tajikistan	Dushanbe	April 18-19	State visit
Russia	Moscow	May 8-9	Working visit
Turkiye	Ankara	June 6	State visit
Kazakhstan	Astana	July 3-4	Working visit. Participation in the SCO Summit
Azerbaijan	Shusha	July 5	Working visit
Kazakhstan	Astana	August 7-9	State visit.
Kazakhstan	Astana	September 17	Working visit
Russia	Moscow	October 7-8	Working visit
Turkmenistan	Ashgabat	October 11-12	Working visit
Russia	Kazan	October 23-24	Working visit
Kyrgyzstan	Bishkek	November 5-6	Working visit
Saudi Arabia	Riyadh	November 11	Working visit
Azerbaijan	Baku	November 12-13	Working visit

== 2025 ==
Country	Areas visited	Date(s)	Notes
United Arab Emirates	Dubai	13 January	State visit.
Malaysia	Kuala Lumpur	4–5 February	State visit.
Kuwait	Kuwait City	13 February	State visit.
France	Paris	11–13 March	State visit.
Kazakhstan	Almaty	29 March	Working visit.
Tajikistan	Khujand	31 March	Participated in a trilateral summit; signed a border junction treaty with Tajikistan and Kyrgyzstan.
Russia	Moscow	8-9 May	Working visit
Hungary	Budapest	19 May	State visit.
Slovenia	Ljubljana	21–22 May	State visit.
Kazakhstan	Astana	30 May	Attended the Italy-Central Asia Summit.
Kazakhstan	Astana	16–18 June	Attended the 2nd China–Central Asia Summit.
Mongolia	Ulaanbaatar	24–25 June	State visit.
Belarus	Minsk	26-27 June	Working visit.
Azerbaijan	Baku, Khankendi, Shusha, Aghdam	2–4 July	State visit. Participated in the 17th ECO Summit in Khankendi.
Turkmenistan	Awaza National Tourist Zone	4–5 August	Working visit.
Turkmenistan	Awaza National Tourist Zone	22 August	Working visit.
China	Beijing	August 30 – September 3	Official visit.
Belgium	Brussels	October 23–24	Working visit. Participated in meetings regarding EU-Uzbekistan partnership and cooperation.
United States	Washington, D.C.	November 5–6	Working visit. Discussions on multi-billion-dollar investments and bilateral cooperation.

== 2026 ==
Country	Areas visited	Date(s)	Notes
Switzerland	Davos	January 22	Working visit. Participated in the signed the founding charter of the Board of Peace.
Turkey	Ankara	January 29	State visit.
Pakistan	Islamabad	February 5–6	State visit. Focused on regional connectivity, trade, and strategic partnerships. The two sides set a target of $2 billion in bilateral trade.
United States	Washington, D.C.	February 17–19	Working visit. Participated in the inaugural meeting of the Board of Peace and held talks on bilateral cooperation and investment.
Kazakhstan	Astana	April 21–22	Working visit. Attended the Regional Environmental Summit and the RES2026 EXPO.
Russia	Moscow	May 8–9	Working visit. Attended ceremonies marking the 81st anniversary of the end of the Second World War, including Russia’s military parade.
Azerbaijan	Baku	May 17–18	Working visit. Concluded regional economic and transit agreements.
Kazakhstan	Astana	May 29	Working visit. Attended the Supreme Eurasian Economic Council.
Russia	St. Petersburg	June 4–5	Working visit. Attended the St. Petersburg International Economic Forum (SPIEF) and held bilateral talks with President Vladimir Putin.
Georgia	Tbilisi	July 2–3	State visit. First Uzbek state visit to Georgia in 23 years. Focused on expanding trade, logistics, and economic cooperation.
Belarus	Minsk	July 8–9	State visit.
Qatar	Doha	July 14	Working visit. Gave condolences for the death of former Emir.
Kazakhstan	Astana	July 29	Working visit. Attended the Games of the Future opening ceremony.
Kyrgyzstan	Cholpon-Ata	July 30–August 1	State visit by invitation of president Sadyr Japarov.
Kyrgyzstan	Bishkek	August 31–September 1	Working visit. Attended the 2026 SCO summit and the opening ceremony of the 6th World Nomad Games.
Serbia	Belgrade	September 7–8	State visit.
South Korea	Seoul	September 13–16	State visit. Attended the 1st Korea-Central Asia Summit.
Turkmenistan	Awaza National Tourist Zone	October 7–9	Working visit. Attended the CIS summit.
Azerbaijan	Baku	October 14–15	Working visit. Attended the CICA summit.
Turkey	Ankara	October 29–30	Working visit. Attended the 13th OTS summit.
Kazakhstan	Astana	November 5–6	Working visit. Attended the Aqaba Process summit.
Turkey	Antalya	November 10–11	Working visit. Attended the 2026 United Nations Climate Change Conference.
Oman	Muscat	November 16–17	State visit by invitation of sultan Haitham bin Tariq Al Said.

== Future visits ==
Country	Areas visited	Date(s)	Notes
United States	Miami	14–15 December	Mirziyoyev is scheduled to attend the G20 summit.
Russia	Saint Petersburg	21 December	Mirziyoyev is plan to attend the EAEU and informal CIS summit.

== Number of visits ==
Updated as of October 2026.

Country	Visits
Kazakhstan	25
Russia	23
Turkmenistan	15
Kyrgyzstan	11
Tajikistan	10
China	10
Azerbaijan	10
Turkey	9
United Arab Emirates	5
Saudi Arabia	5
United States	5
Belarus	3
Germany	3
France	3
Hungary	3
South Korea	3
India	2
Pakistan	2
Egypt	1
Iran	1
Italy	1
Japan	1
Qatar	1
Belgium	1
Georgia	1
Malaysia	1
Kuwait	1
Mongolia	1
Oman	1
Serbia	1
Singapore	1
Slovenia	1
Switzerland	1

== Visits hosted in Uzbekistan by Shavkat Mirziyoyev ==
Since September 2016, all the visits to Uzbekistan have had the character of working visits. Mostly it was giving honor to the First President Islam Karimov at his burial site. On 16 September 2017, Kazakh President Nursultan Nazarbayev visited Uzbekistan with state visit. That was the first state visit hosted by Mirziyoyev in Tashkent.

=== State visits ===
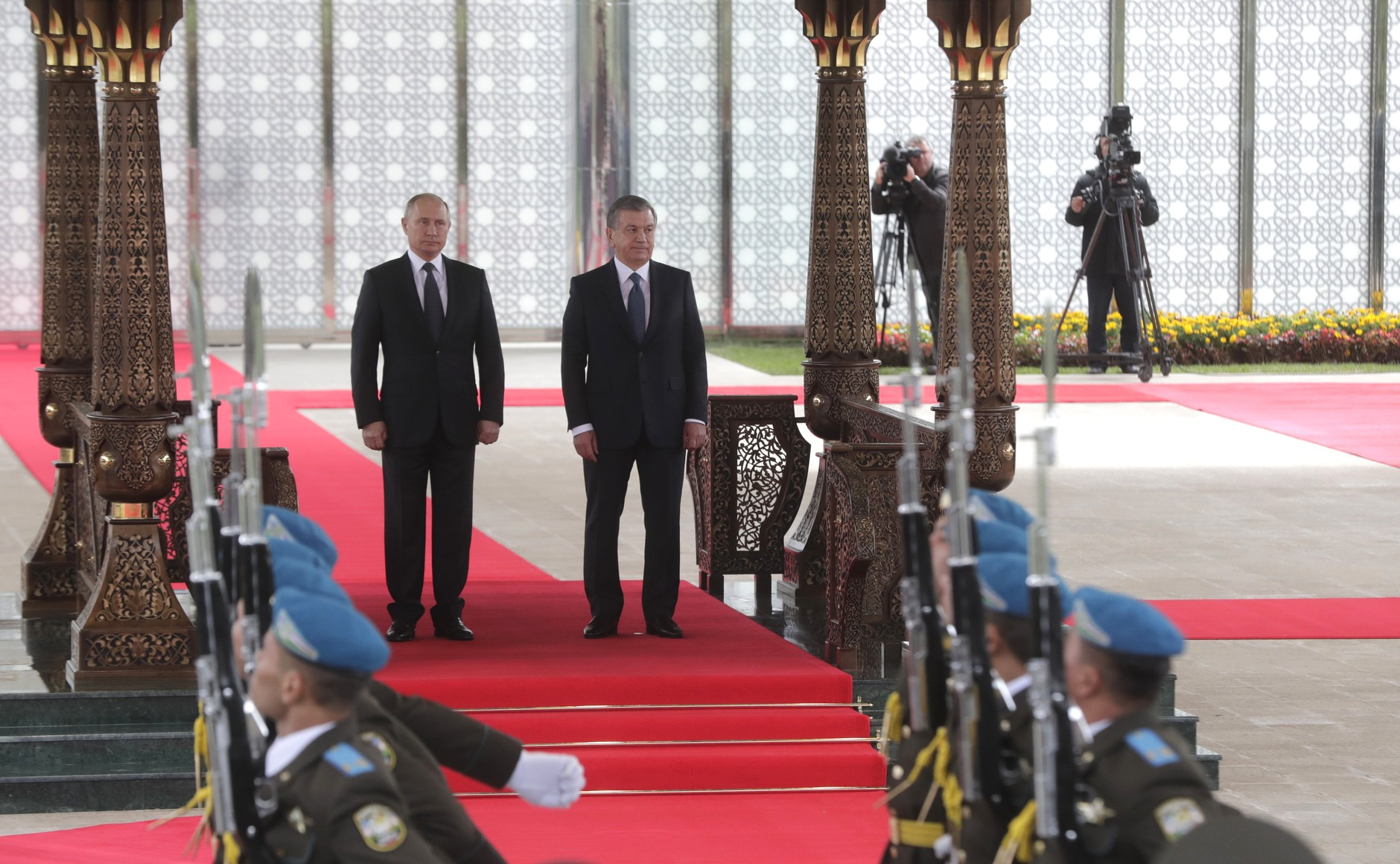
State visit of Russian President to Uzbekistan in October 2018

Country	Name	Title	Date
United Nations	António Guterres	UN Secretary-General	June 10–11, 2017
Kazakhstan	Nursultan Nazarbayev	President of Kazakhstan	September 16–17, 2017
Kyrgyzstan	Almazbek Atambayev	President of Kyrgyzstan	October 5–6, 2017
(Islamic Republic of Afghanistan) Afghanistan	Ashraf Ghani	President of Afghanistan	December 4–5
Kyrgyzstan	Sooronbay Jeenbekov	President of Kyrgyzstan	December 13–14, 2017
Turkmenistan	Gurbanguly Berdimuhamedov	President of Turkmenistan	April 23–24, 2018
Turkey	Recep Tayyip Erdoğan	President of Turkey	April 29 – May 1, 2018
Tajikistan	Emomali Rahmon	President of Tajikistan	August 16–17, 2018
Egypt	Abdel Fattah el-Sisi	President of Egypt	September 4–5, 2018
Belarus	Alexander Lukashenko	President of Belarus	September 13–14, 2018
Russia	Vladimir Putin	President of Russia	October 18–19, 2018
Kazakhstan	Kassym-Jomart Tokayev	President of Kazakhstan	April 14, 2019
South Korea	Moon Jae In	President of South Korea	April 18–21 2019
Germany	Frank-Walter Steinmeier	President of Germany	May 27–29, 2019
Kyrgyzstan	Sadyr Japarov	President of Kyrgyzstan	March 11–12, 2021
Hungary	Viktor Orban	Prime Minister of Hungary	March 30, 2021
Pakistan	Imran Khan	Prime Minister of Pakistan	July 15–16, 2021
Turkmenistan	Gurbanguly Berdimuhamedov	President of Turkmenistan	October 4–5, 2021
Turkey	Recep Tayyip Erdoğan	President of Turkey	March 29–31, 2022
Tajikistan	Emomali Rahmon	President of Tajikistan	June 2–3, 2022
Azerbaijan	Ilham Aliyev	President of Azerbaijan	June 21–22, 2022
Turkmenistan	Serdar Berdimuhamedow	President of Turkmenistan	July 14–15, 2022
Iran	Ebrahim Raisi	President of Iran	September 14–16, 2022
China	Xi Jinping	General Secretary of the Chinese Communist Party; President of China	September 14–16, 2022
European Union	Charles Michel	President of the European Council	October 28, 2022
Kazakhstan	Kassym-Jomart Tokayev	President of Kazakhstan	December 21–22, 2022
Singapore	Halimah Yacob	President of Singapore	May 23-25, 2023
Qatar	Tamim bin Hamad Al Thani	Emir of Qatar	June 4-5, 2023
France	Emmanuel Macron	President of France	November 1-2, 2023
Italy	Sergio Mattarella	President of Italy	November 9-11, 2023
Qatar	Tamim bin Hamad Al Thani	Emir of Qatar	December 19, 2023
Belarus	Alexander Lukashenko	President of Belarus	February 7–8, 2024
Kazakhstan	Kassym-Jomart Tokayev	President of Kazakhstan	April 5, 2024
Malaysia	Anwar Ibrahim	Prime Minister of Malaysia	May 17-19, 2024
Russia	Vladimir Putin	President of Russia	May 26-27, 2024
South Korea	Yoon Suk Yeol	President of Korea	June 13-15, 2024
Mongolia	Ukhnaagiin Khürelsükh	President of Mongolia	June 23-26, 2024
United Nations	António Guterres	UN Secretary-General	June 30 July 1, 2024
Kyrgyzstan	Sadyr Japarov	President of Kyrgyzstan	July 18-19, 2024
Azerbaijan	Ilham Aliyev	President of Azerbaijan	August 22–23, 2024
Germany	Olaf Scholz	Chancellor of Germany	September 15-16, 2024

=== Working visits ===
Country	Name	Title	Date	Commentary
Kyrgyzstan	Almazbek Atambayev	President of Kyrgyzstan	December 24, 2016	Working and Public visit to Samarkand
Kazakhstan	Nursultan Nazarbayev	President of Kazakhstan	March 21, 2018	During his Working and Public visit to Samarkand, he also attended the celebration of Navruz in this city
(Islamic Republic of Afghanistan) Afghanistan	Ashraf Ghani	President of Afghanistan	March 26–27, 2018	Working visit to Tashkent and participation in the international conference on Afghanistan "Peace process, security cooperation and regional cooperation"
European Union	Donald Tusk	President of the European Council	May 31 – June 2, 2019	A Working visit to Tashkent as well as a Public visit to the cities of Samarkand and Bukhara
(Islamic Republic of Afghanistan) Afghanistan	Ashraf Ghani	President of Afghanistan	July 15–16, 2021	Working visit to Tashkent and participation in the international conference "Central and South Asia: Regional Interconnectedness. Challenges and opportunities"
Kyrgyzstan	Sadyr Japarov	President of Kyrgyzstan	September 14–16, 2022	Working visit during the annual summit of heads of state of the SCO member countries in Samarkand
Mongolia	Ukhnaagiin Khürelsükh	President of Mongolia	September 14–16, 2022	Working visit during the annual SCO summit in Samarkand as a guest of honor and as the head of the SCO observer country
Azerbaijan	Ilham Aliyev	President of Azerbaijan	September 15–16, 2022	Working visit during the annual SCO summit in Samarkand as a guest of honor and as the head of the country of the SCO dialogue partner
Belarus	Alexander Lukashenko	President of Belarus	September 15–16, 2022	Working visit during the annual SCO summit in Samarkand as a guest of honor and as the head of the SCO observer country
India	Narendra Modi	Prime Minister of India	September 15–16, 2022	Working visit during the annual summit of heads of state of the SCO member countries in Samarkand
Kazakhstan	Kassym-Jomart Tokayev	President of Kazakhstan	September 15–16, 2022	Working visit during the annual summit of heads of state of the SCO member countries in Samarkand
Pakistan	Shahbaz Shareef	Prime Minister of Pakistan	September 15–16, 2022	Working visit during the annual summit of heads of state of the SCO member countries in Samarkand
Russia	Vladimir Putin	President of Russia	September 15–16, 2022	Working visit during the annual summit of heads of state of the SCO member countries in Samarkand and Semi-official visit to Uzbekistan (also in Samarkand)
Tajikistan	Emomali Rahmon	President of Tajikistan	September 15–16, 2022	Working visit during the annual summit of heads of state of the SCO member countries in Samarkand
Turkey	Recep Tayyip Erdoğan	President of Turkey	September 15–16, 2022	Working visit during the annual SCO summit in Samarkand as a guest of honor and as the head of the country of the SCO dialogue partner
Turkmenistan	Serdar Berdimuhamedow	President of Turkmenistan	September 15–16, 2022	Working visit during the annual SCO summit in Samarkand as a guest of honor
Azerbaijan	Ilham Aliyev	President of Azerbaijan	November 10–11, 2022	Working visit
Turkey	Recep Tayyip Erdoğan	President of Turkey	November 10–11, 2022	Working visit
Kazakhstan	Kassym-Jomart Tokayev	President of Kazakhstan	November 10–11, 2022	Working visit
Kyrgyzstan	Sadyr Japarov	President of Kyrgyzstan	November 10–11, 2022	
Turkmenistan	Gurbanguly Berdimuhamedow	Chairman of the People's Council of Turkmenistan	November 10–11, 2022	Working Visit
Hungary	Viktor Orbán	Prime Minister of Hungary	November 10–11, 2022	Working Visit
Kyrgyzstan	Sadyr Japarov	President of Kyrgyzstan	November 8-9, 2023	Working Visit
Turkmenistan	Serdar Berdimuhamedow	President of Turkmenistan	November 8-9, 2023	Working Visit
Azerbaijan	Ilham Aliyev	President of Azerbaijan	November 8-9, 2023	Working Visit
Turkey	Recep Tayyip Erdoğan	President of Turkey	November 8-9, 2023	Working Visit
Tajikistan	Emomali Rahmon	President of Tajikistan	November 8-9, 2023	Working Visit
Iran	Ebrahim Raisi	President of Iran	November 8-9, 2023	Working Visit
Kazakhstan	Älihan Smaiylov	Prime Minister of Kazakhstan	November 8-9, 2023	Working Visit
Pakistan	Anwaar ul Haq Kakar	Prime Minister of Pakistan	November 8-9, 2023	Working Visit

=== Public and regional visits ===
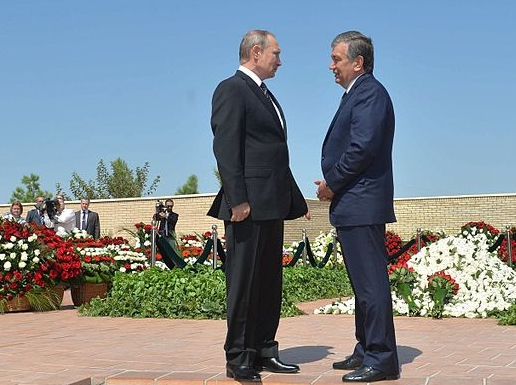
Prime Minister of Uzbekistan Shavkat Mirziyoyev with Vladimir Putin during visit to the burial of President Karimov in Samarkand in 2016

Country	Name	Title	Date	Note
Russia	Vladimir Putin	President of Russia	September 6, 2016	The President of Russia visited the grave of Islam Karimov in Samarkand, met with Karimov's wife and daughter, and met with Shavkat Mirziyoyev.
Kazakhstan	Nursultan Nazarbayev	President of Kazakhstan	September 12, 2016	The President of Kazakhstan visited the grave of Islam Karimov in Samarkand, met with Karimov's wife and daughter, and met with Shavkat Mirziyoyev.
Belarus	Alexander Lukashenko	President of Belarus	October 6, 2016	The President of Belarus visited the grave of Islam Karimov in Samarkand, met with Karimov's wife and daughter, and met with Shavkat Mirziyoyev.
Turkey	Recep Tayyip Erdoğan	President of Turkey	November 17–18, 2016	The President of Turkey visited the grave of Islam Karimov in Samarkand, met with Karimov's wife and daughter, and met with Shavkat Mirziyoyev. Also visited the famous sights and places of Samarkand.
Bangladesh	Mohammad Abdul Hamid	President of Bangladesh	June 16–18, 2019	The President of Bangladesh and his wife visited Uzbekistan on a tourist, ziyarat and working visit. Visited the sights and famous places of Bukhara, Samarkand and Tashkent, as well as acquainted with the activities of the textile company. On June 15, Abdul met with Shavkat Mirziyoyev in Dushanbe, the capital of Tajikistan, at the CICA summit.
