= Gulch =

Deep V-shaped valley formed by erosion

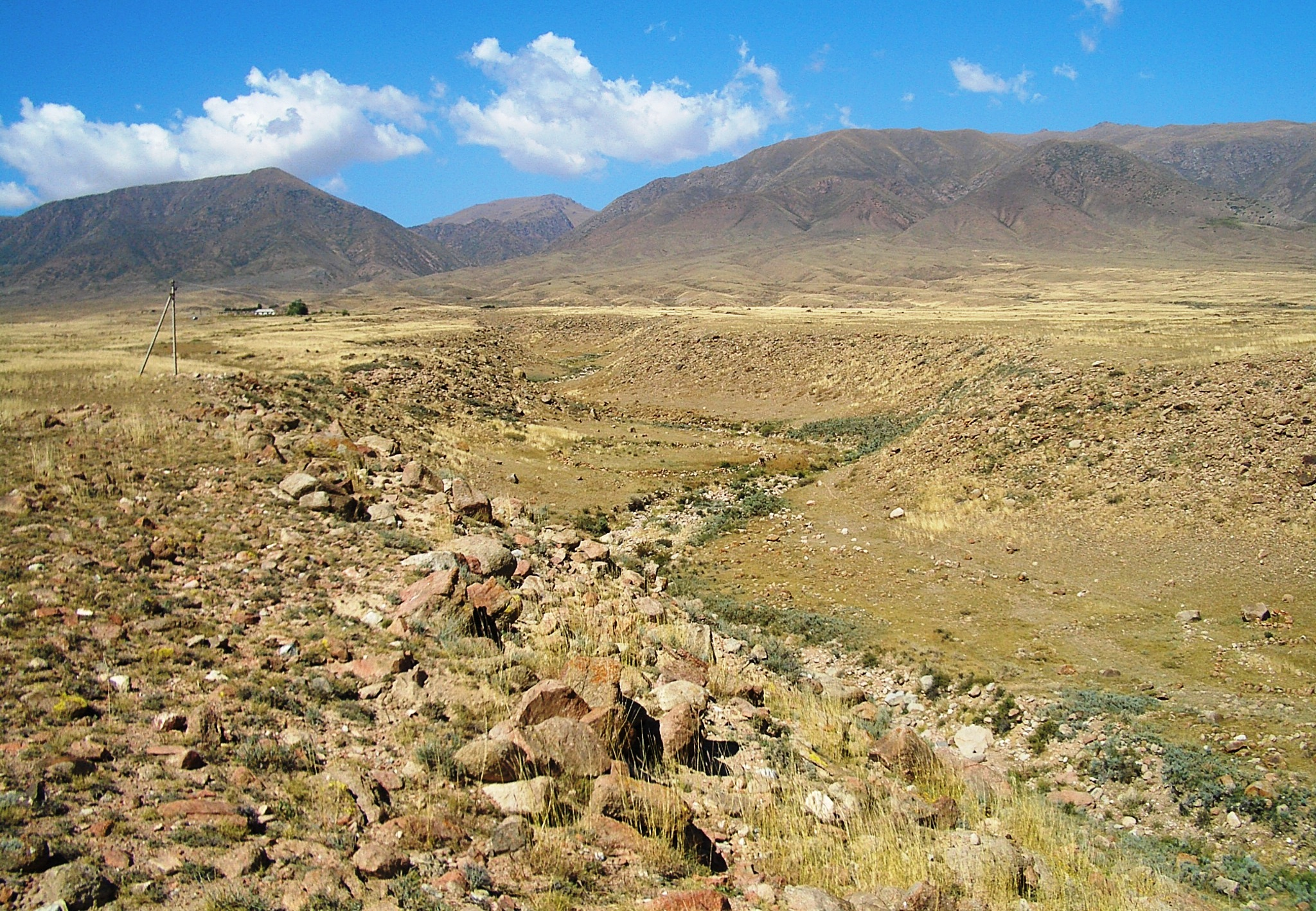
A dry gulch in the desert near Tamchy, Kyrgyzstan. The creek that may have run along the bottom of the gulch in the past has been diverted to a parallel aryk.

A gulch is a deep V-shaped valley formed by erosion. It may contain a small stream or dry creek bed and is usually larger in size than a gully. Sudden intense rainfall upstream may produce flash floods in the bed of the gulch.

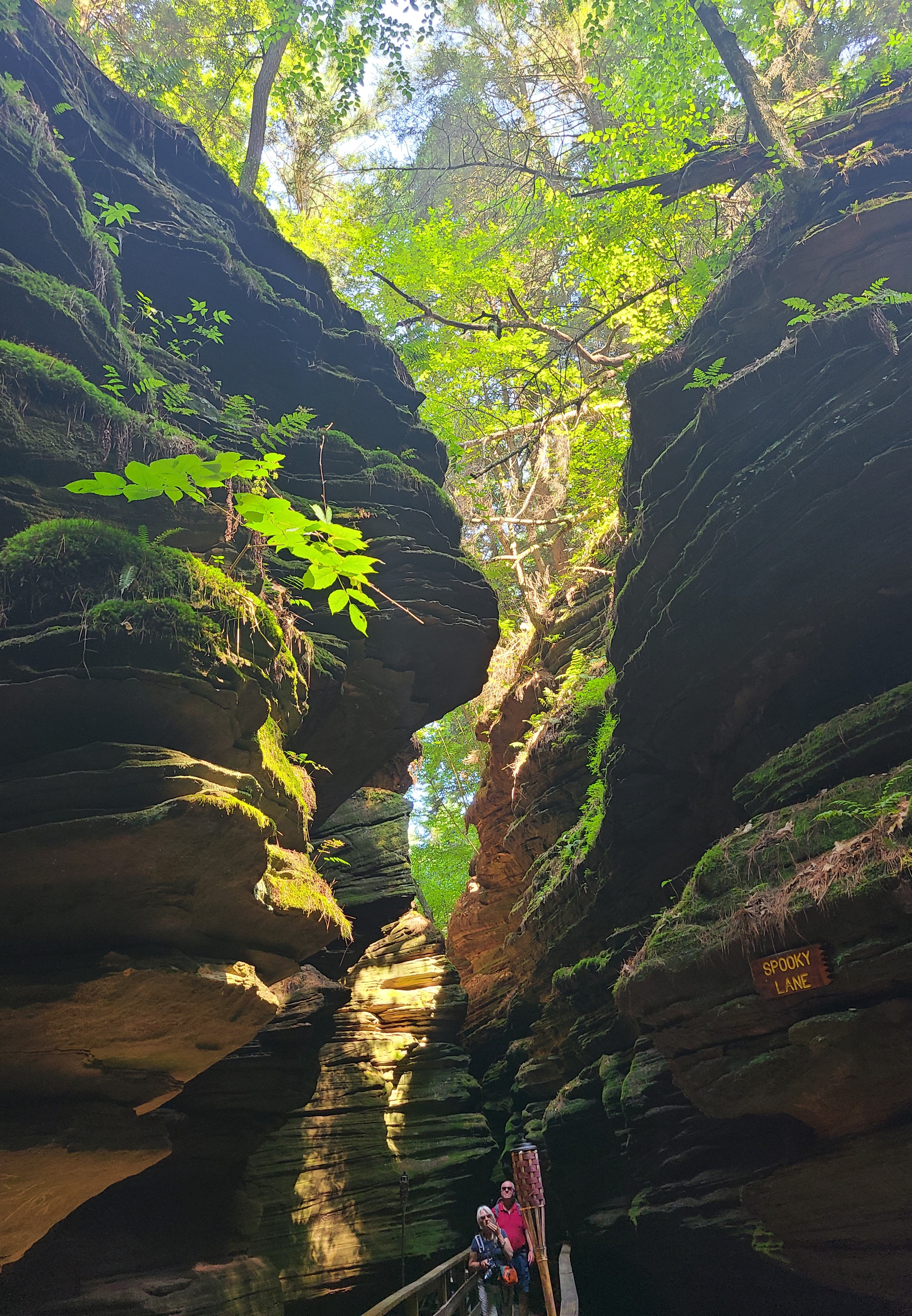
Witches Gulch found in the Dells of the Wisconsin River

In eastern Canada, gulch refers to:

- a narrow deep cove (Newfoundland)
- a narrow saltwater channel (Nova Scotia)

== See also ==
- Arroyo – Dry watercourse with flow after rain
- Canyon – Deep chasm between cliffs, includes gorge.
- Chine – Steep-sided coastal gorge in central southern England
- Dale (landform) – Open valley
- Coulee – Type of valley or drainage zone
- Gully – Landform created by running water and/or mass movement eroding sharply into soil
- Ravine – Small valley, often due to stream erosion
- Valley – Low area between hills, often with a river running through it
- Wadi – Hydrological feature
- Draw (terrain) – Long area of downward-sloping low ground
