= Oʻrtaovul =

- urban-type settlement
- Location in Uzbekistan
- Coordinates: 41°11′27″N 69°08′58″E
- Country: Uzbekistan
- Region: Tashkent Region
- District: Zangiota District
- Urban-type settlement status: 1974

Population (1989)
  - Total: 13,271
- Time zone: UTC+5 (UZT)

Oʻrtaovul (Uzbek: Oʻrtaovul/Ўртаовул, Russian: Уртааул, romanized: Urtaaul) is an urban-type settlement in Tashkent Region, Uzbekistan. It is part of Zangiota District. The town's population in 1989 was 13,271.
