= Zangiota Complex =

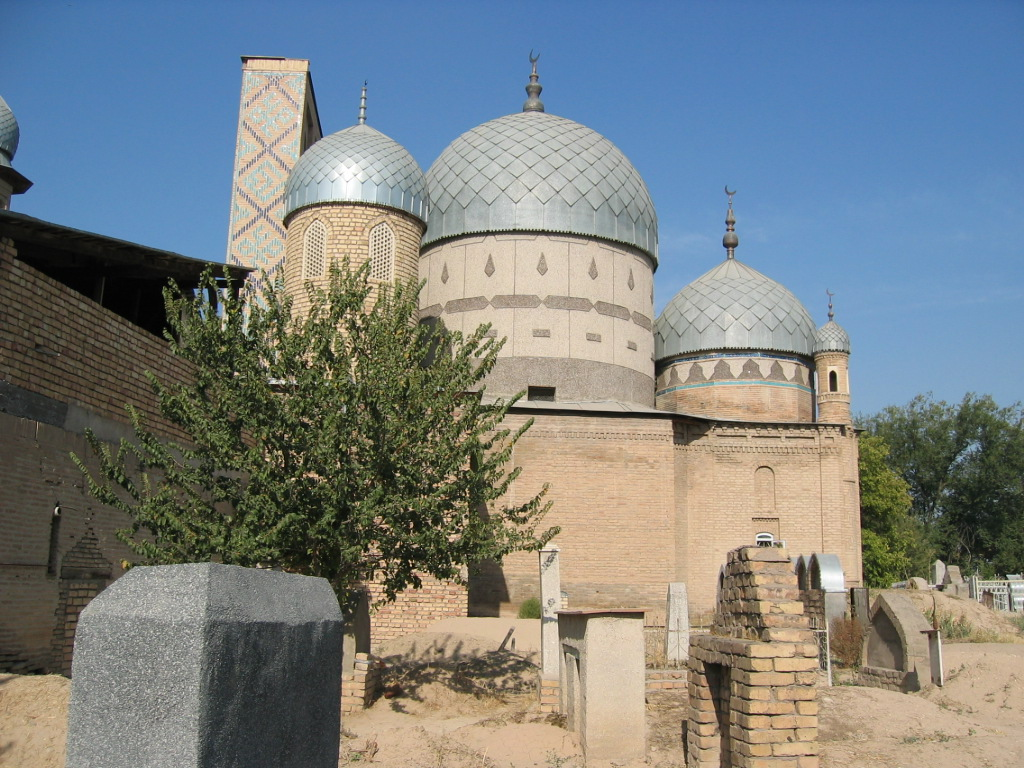
- The Zangiota Complex
- Interactive map of the Zangiota Complex area

General information
- Location: Zangiota, Tashkent Region, Uzbekistan
- Coordinates: 41.196979°N 69.158011°E
- Year built: 14th-19th centuries
- Renovated: 1990s

Technical details
- Material: Brick, stone, wood, mosaic, majolica

The Zangiota Complex is a historical and architectural monument (15th-20th centuries) in the Zangiota district of Tashkent Region, Uzbekistan. The complex consists of the mausoleums of Zangiota and Anbar Bibi, a portal, a madrasa, a mosque, a khanqah, a minaret and a pool. The mausoleum of Zangiota is adjacent to the madrasa and the mosque, and is accessed through the gates on the north-east and north-west sides of the courtyard. The minaret is also located in the center of the courtyard, closer to the mausoleum of Zangiota, the mosque and the mausoleum. The complex is reached by a two-sided arcade. The complex is surrounded by a cemetery, which is enclosed by a wall. The mausoleum of Zangiota faces the portal to the courtyard, while the other three sides are adjacent to the cemetery.

== Architecture ==
The mausoleum of Zangiota was originally a four-room structure (a ziyaratkhana, a tomb chamber and two small rooms where the saints’ relics were kept), without any decoration. The inner walls of the room were made of carved stone, the corners were octagonal, and the domes were different. The arches and cornices were decorated. The white marble tombstone in the tomb chamber had a fine carved pattern and Arabic inscriptions. Later, a portal was built in front of the mausoleum and decorated with glazed tiles. The outer walls of the portal and the rooms, the ziyaratkhana and the tomb chamber's dome were covered with blue tiles. The minaret of the Zangiota complex was decorated with carved, colorful glazed tiles. The interior of the room was decorated with majolica, and the mihrab had a P-shaped arch and Arabic writing. The dome's underside was decorated with gold leaf. The portal's prominent niches were made of wood, brick and composite arches, and had octagonal lanterns. The mausoleum was built by Amir Temur (late 14th century) and decorated during the reign of Ulugbek (early 15th century). The portal and the domes were repaired in the 16th-17th centuries. A one-story madrasa and a prayer hall mosque were built next to the mausoleum (1832). The madrasa consisted of a row of one-story rooms, two portals and three larger rooms (classrooms). In 1870, the complex was repaired, and the prayer hall mosque's minaret was built. The master was Khwaja Muhammad from Kokand. The complex was landscaped, and designated as a historical monument under state protection.

The memorial complex consists of three separate areas. The first area contains buildings from the 14th-16th centuries, the second area has the graveyard with the mausoleum of Anbar-ona, the spouse of the eminent Sufi, and the third area features a large garden. The main area has the structures such as the mausoleum of Zangiota, the mosque, the minaret and the related courtyard.

The door is accessed through a big portal adorned with colorful mosaic. It has patterns and Arabic writing. The portal was constructed during the rule of Mirzo Ulugbek, the grandson of Amir Timur. Moreover, the entrance is embellished by two towers on its right and left sides. In the southern part of the complex, there is a mosque built in the 19th century by a local judge.

In the 18th-19th centuries, a new building of the Muslim theological school, called Madrasa, was added to the ensemble of buildings. The building has a trapezoidal courtyard where the windows of the students' cells used to be.

== Gallery ==
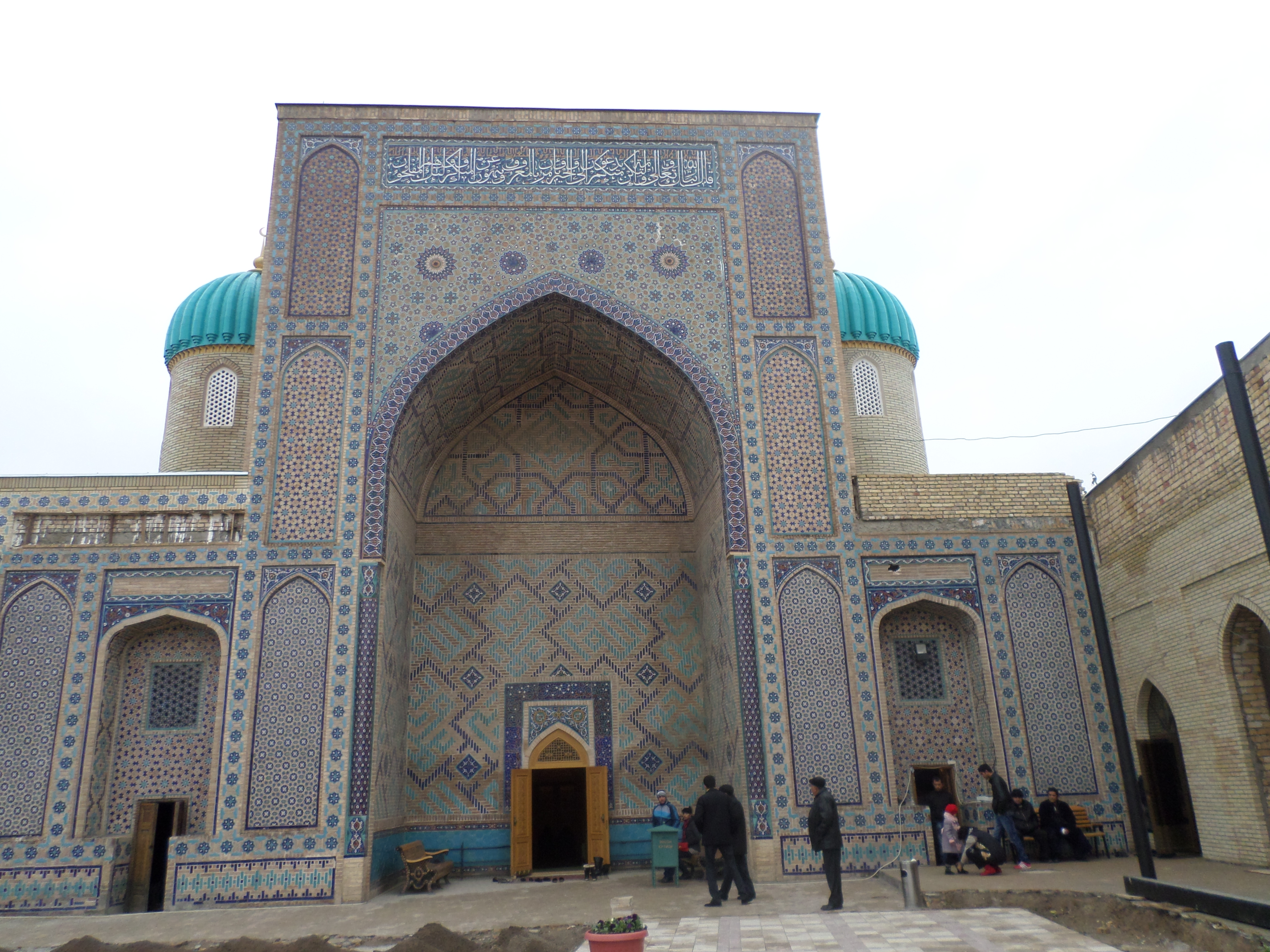
Front view

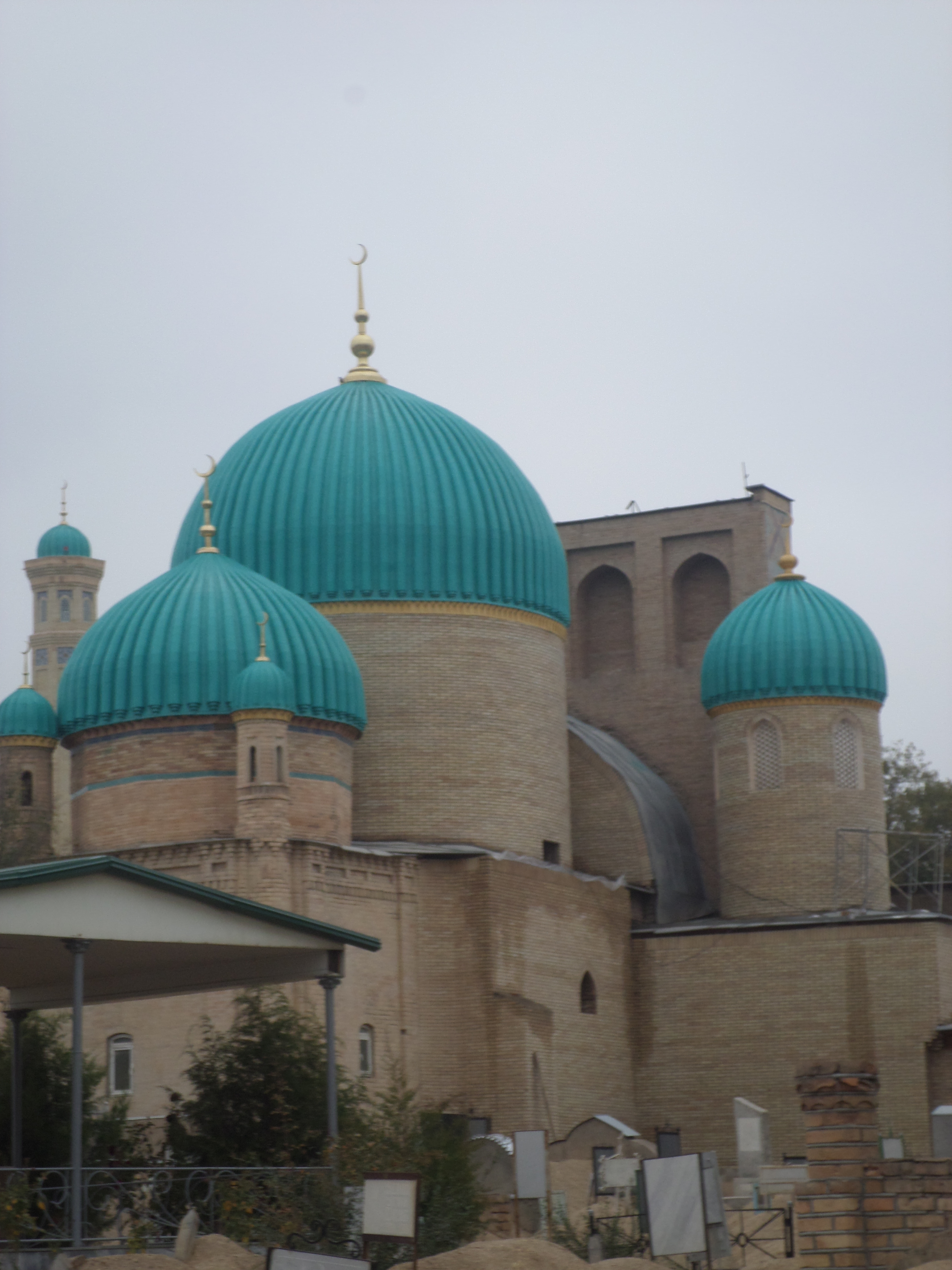
Domes of the building

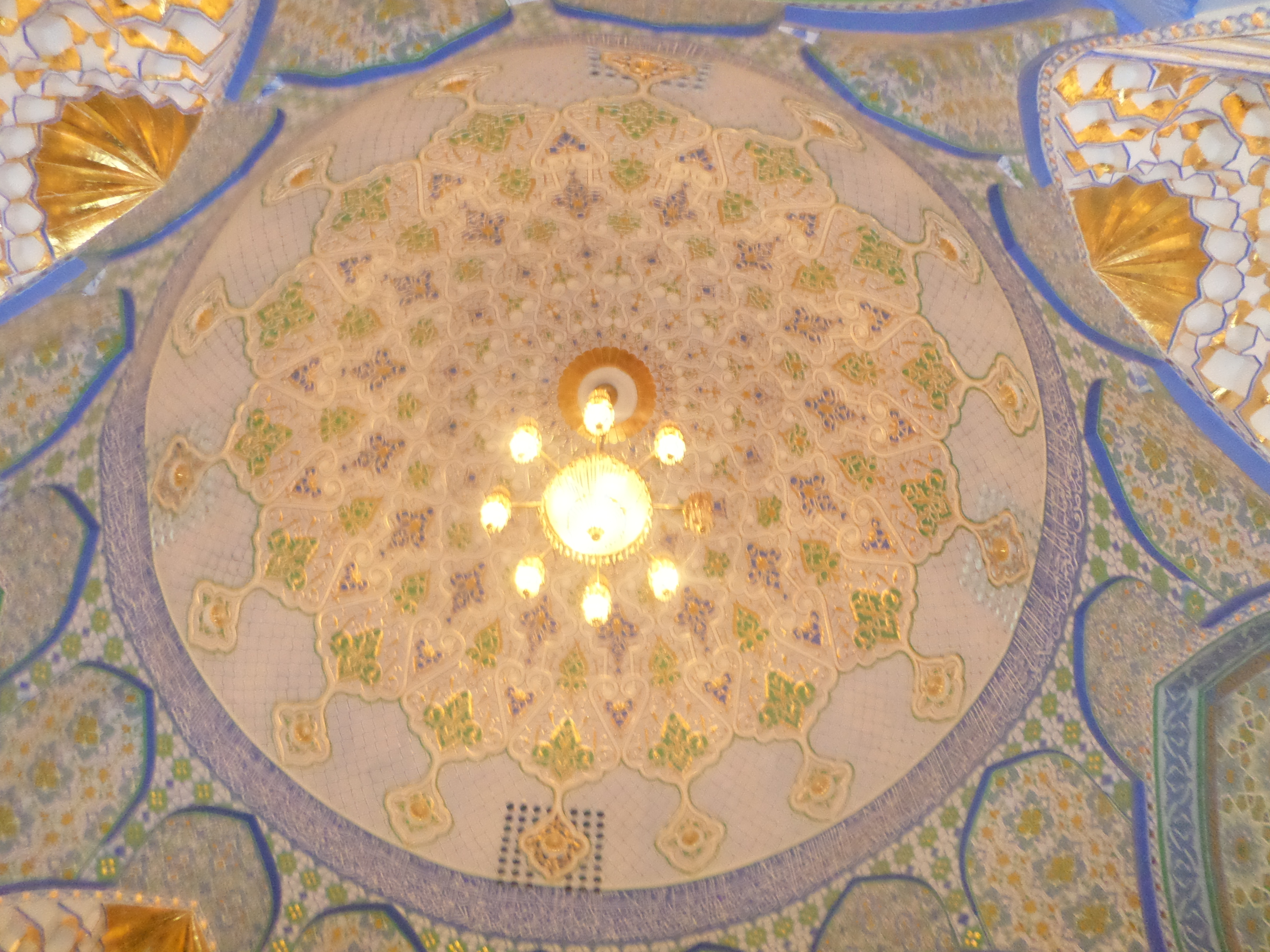
Inside of the dome

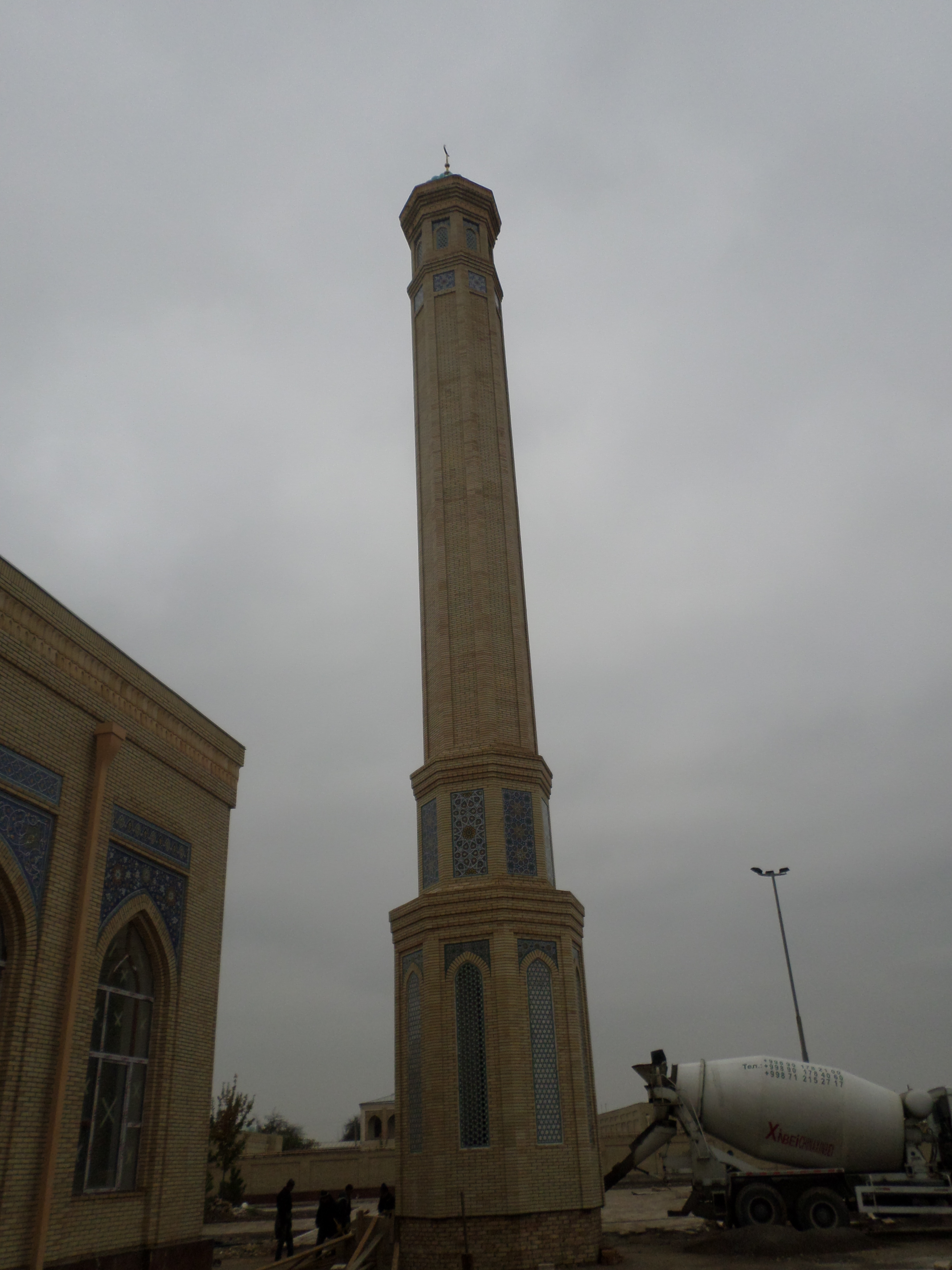
Minaret of the complex

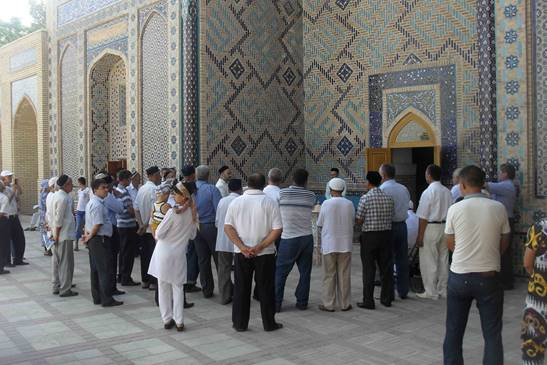
Tourists coming to the mausoleum
