= Eshonguzar =

- urban-type settlement
- Location in Uzbekistan
- Coordinates: 41°15′05″N 69°09′11″E
- Country: Uzbekistan
- Region: Tashkent Region
- District: Zangiota District
- Urban-type settlement status: 1977

Population (1989)
  - Total: 6,386
- Time zone: UTC+5 (UZT)

Eshonguzar (Uzbek: Eshonguzar/Эшонгузар, Russian: Эшангузар, romanized: Eshanguzar) is an urban-type settlement in Tashkent Region, Uzbekistan. It is part of Zangiota District. The town population in 1989 was 6,386 people.
