= Zangiota District =

Coordinates: 41.9369°N 69.6207°E

Zangiota
- District
- Zangiota tumani
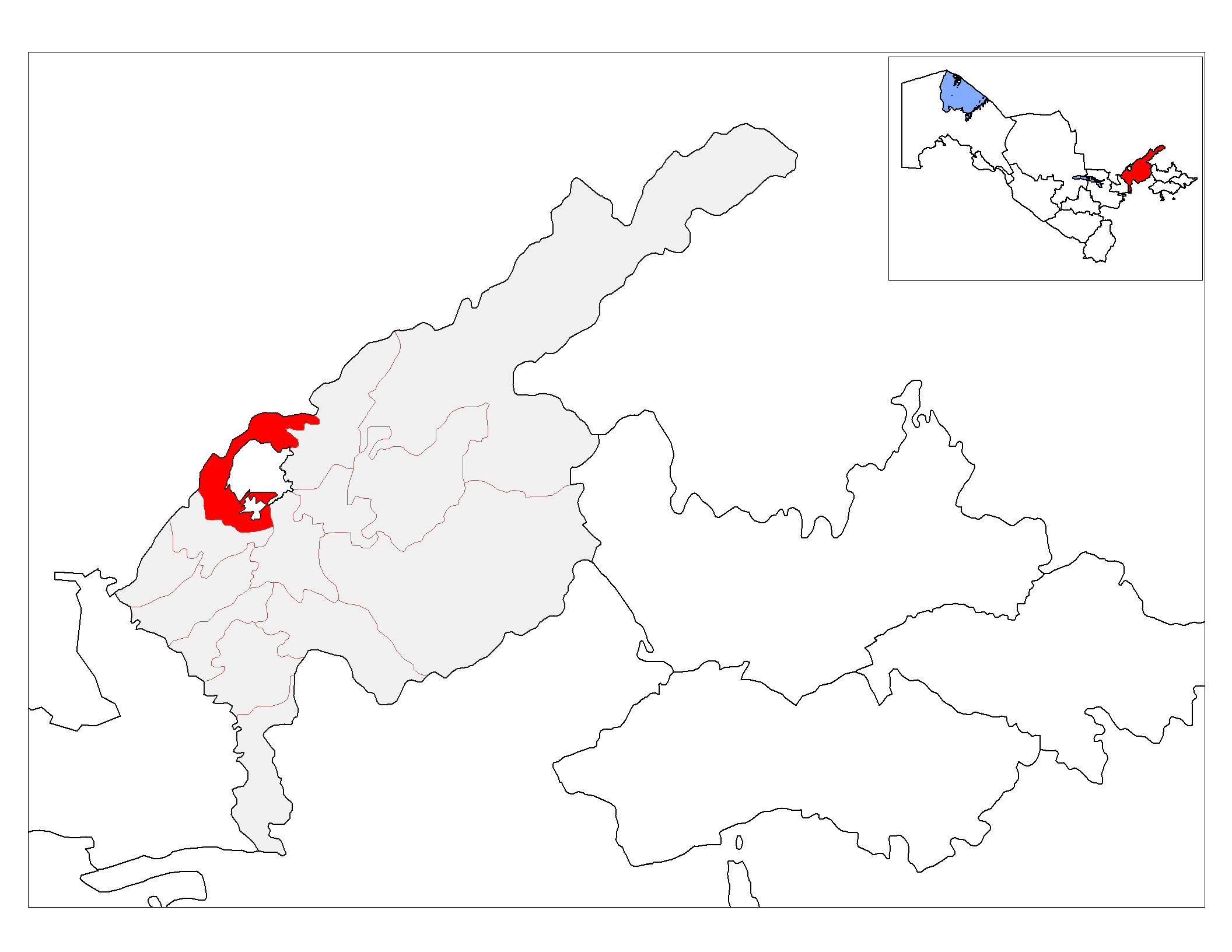
- Country: Uzbekistan
- Region: Tashkent Region
- Capital: Eshonguzar
- Established: 1933

Area
  - Total: 210 km^{2} (81 sq mi)

Population (2021)
  - Total: 195,400
  - Density: 930/km^{2} (2,400/sq mi)
- Time zone: UTC+5 (UZT)

Zangiota is a district of Tashkent Region in Uzbekistan. The capital lies at the town Eshonguzar. It has an area of 210 km^{2} (81 sq mi) and it had 195,400 inhabitants in 2021. Between 2010 and 2017, the territory of Tashkent District was part of Zangiota District.

The district consists of 12 urban-type settlements (Eshonguzar, Oʻrtaovul, Xonabod, Erkin, Quyoshli, Daliguzar, Pastdarxon, Tarnov, Zangiota, Nazarbek, Axmad Yassaviy, Ulugʻbek) and 9 rural communities (Turkiston, Qatortol, Chigʻatoy-Oqtepa, Nazarbek, Zangiota, Oʻzgarish, Boz-su, Honobod, Erkin).

== See also ==
- Zangiota Complex
