= Saryagash District =

Coordinates: 41°37′12″N 68°43′12″E

Saryagash Сарыағаш
- District
- Saryağaş Audany
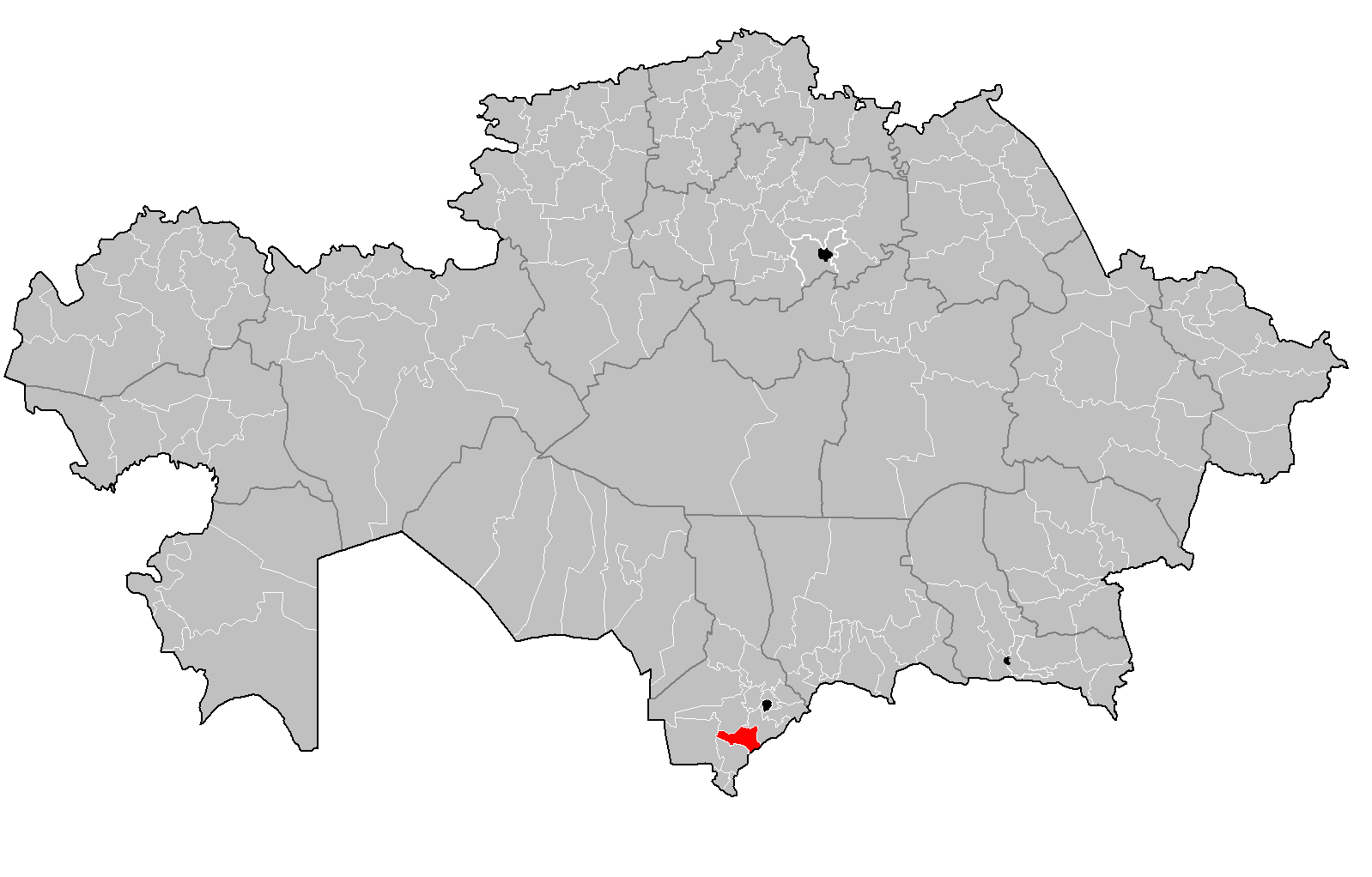
- Country: Kazakhstan
- Region: Turkistan Region
- Administrative center: Saryagash

Government
  - Akim: Mukhit Otarshiev

Population (2013)
  - Total: 303,019
- Time zone: UTC+5 (UTC+5)

Saryagash (Kazakh: Сарыағаш ауданы, Saryağaş audany) is a district of Turkistan Region in southern Kazakhstan. The administrative center of the district is the town of Saryagash. Population: 303,019 (2013 estimate); 272,693 (2009 census results); 212,848 (1999 census results).
