= Keleş =

Keleş, is a Turkish surname. Notable people with the surname include:

- Can Keleş (born 2001), Austrian footballer
- Eren Keles (born 1994), Austrian-Turkish footballer
- Ergin Keleş (born 1987), Turkish footballer
- Ersan Keleş (born 1987), Turkish futsal player
- Ezgi Keleş (born 2002), Turkish female muaythai practitioner
- Fatih Keleş (born 1989), Turkish amateur boxer
- Hakan Keleş (born 1972), Turkish soccer manager
- İsmail Keleş (born 1988), Turkish sport shooter
- Kadir Keleş (born 1988), Turkish footballer
- Sündüz Keleş, Turkish statistician
