= Keles, Uzbekistan =

Keles
- Location in Uzbekistan
- Coordinates: 41°24′12″N 69°12′24″E
- Country: Uzbekistan
- Region: Tashkent Region
- District: Tashkent District
- Town status: 1976

Population (2016)
  - Total: 30,600

Keles is a satellite town, located 2 kilometers north-northwest from Tashkent, Uzbekistan. It is the administrative center of Tashkent District (tuman) of Tashkent Region (viloyat). Its population is 30,600 (2016). The river Keles, a tributary of the Syr Darya, flows north of the town.
