= Tashkent District =

Tashkent District Toshkent tumani
- District
- Location in Uzbekistan
- Coordinates: 41°24′N 69°12′E
- Country: Uzbekistan
- Autonomous Republic: Tashkent Region
- Capital: Keles
- Established: 2017

Area
  - Total: 160 km^{2} (62 sq mi)

Population (2021)
  - Total: 183,200
  - Density: 1,100/km^{2} (3,000/sq mi)
- Time zone: UTC+5 (UZT)

Tashkent District (Uzbek: Toshkent tumani, Russian: Ташкентский район) is a district of Tashkent Region in Uzbekistan. The seat lies at the city Keles. It was first created in 1975, merged into Zangiota District in 2010, and re-established in 2017. It has an area of 160 km^{2} (62 sq mi) and it had 183,200 inhabitants in 2021.

The district consists of one city (Keles), 9 urban-type settlements (Z.Jalilov, Koʻk saroy, Kensoy, Sabzavot, M.Fozilov, Shamsiobod, Chigʻatoy, Hasanboy, Qashqarlik) and 9 rural communities.
