= Keles (river) =

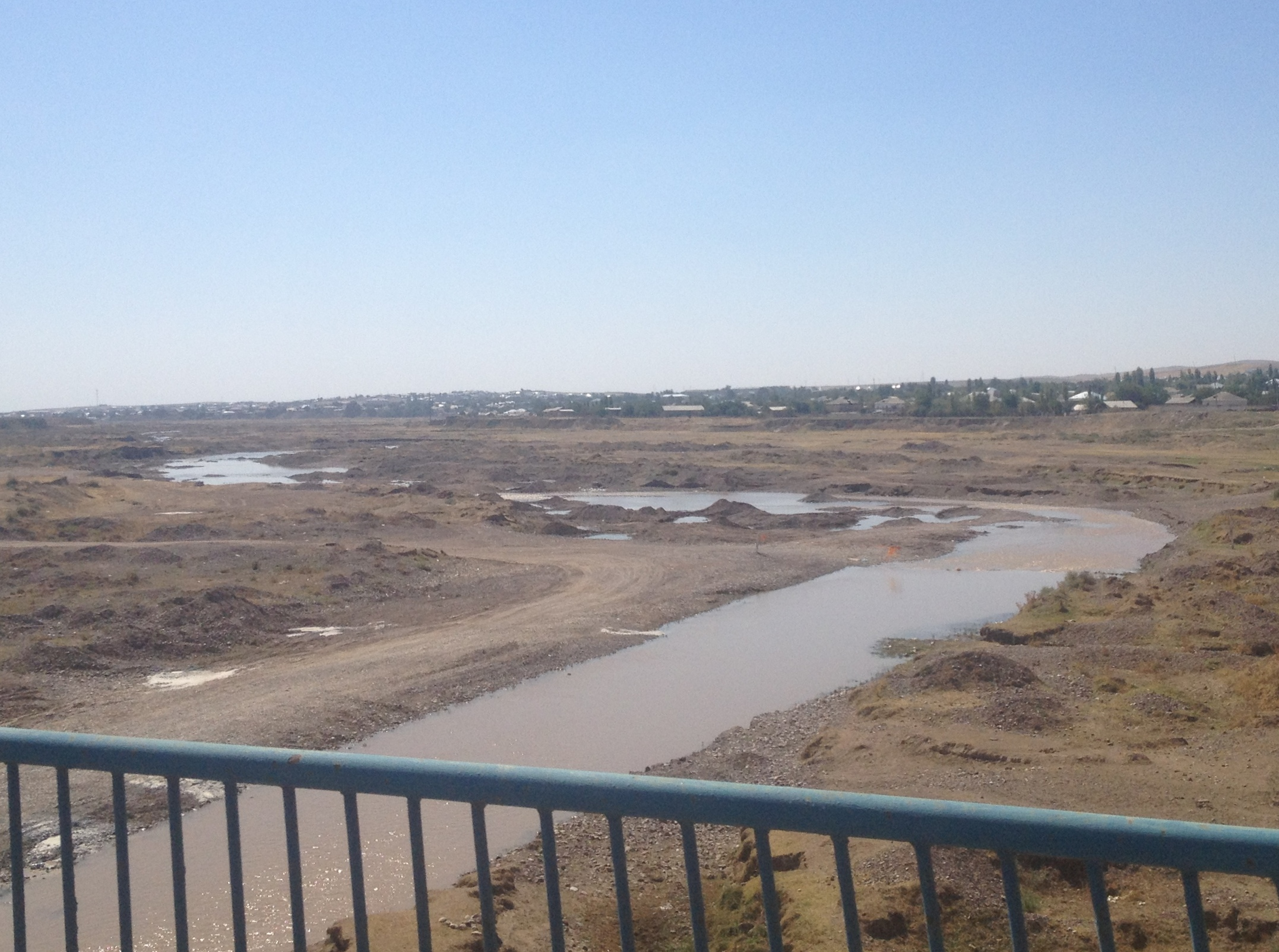

Location
- Country: Kazakhstan, Uzbekistan

Physical characteristics
- Mouth: Syr Darya
  - coordinates: 41°01′16″N 68°36′40″E
- Length: 241 km (150 mi)
- Basin size: 3,310 km^{2} (1,280 sq mi)

Basin features
- Progression: Syr Darya→ North Aral Sea

The Keles (Kazakh: Келес) is a river of southern Kazakhstan (Turkistan Region) and for a short stretch near the town Keles also in Uzbekistan. It is a right tributary of the Syr Darya. It is 241 kilometres (150 mi) long, and has a drainage basin of 3,310 square kilometres (1,280 sq mi).
