= Aryk =

Irrigation canal of central Asia

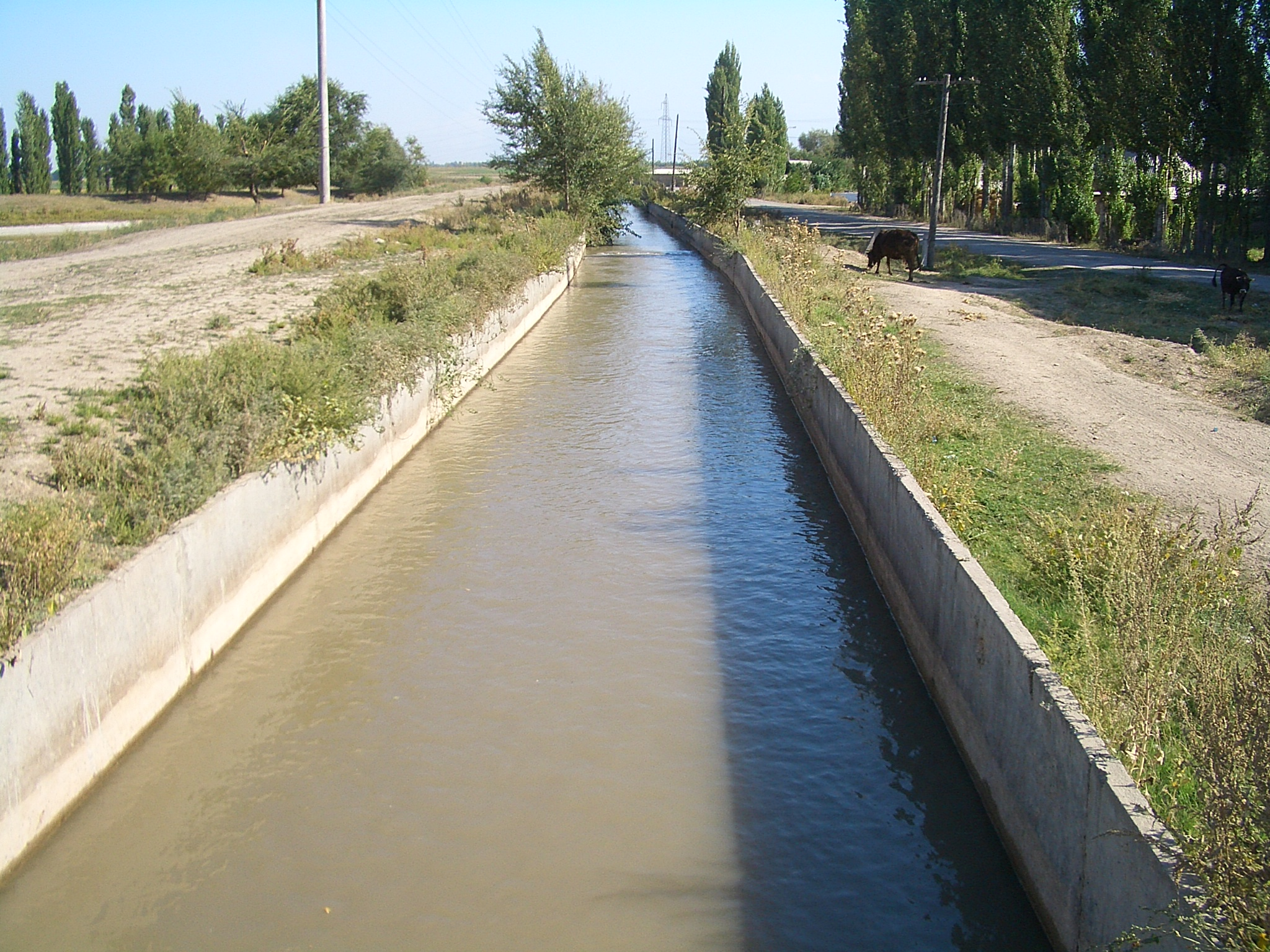
A large concrete-lined aryk at Milyanfan, Kyrgyzstan

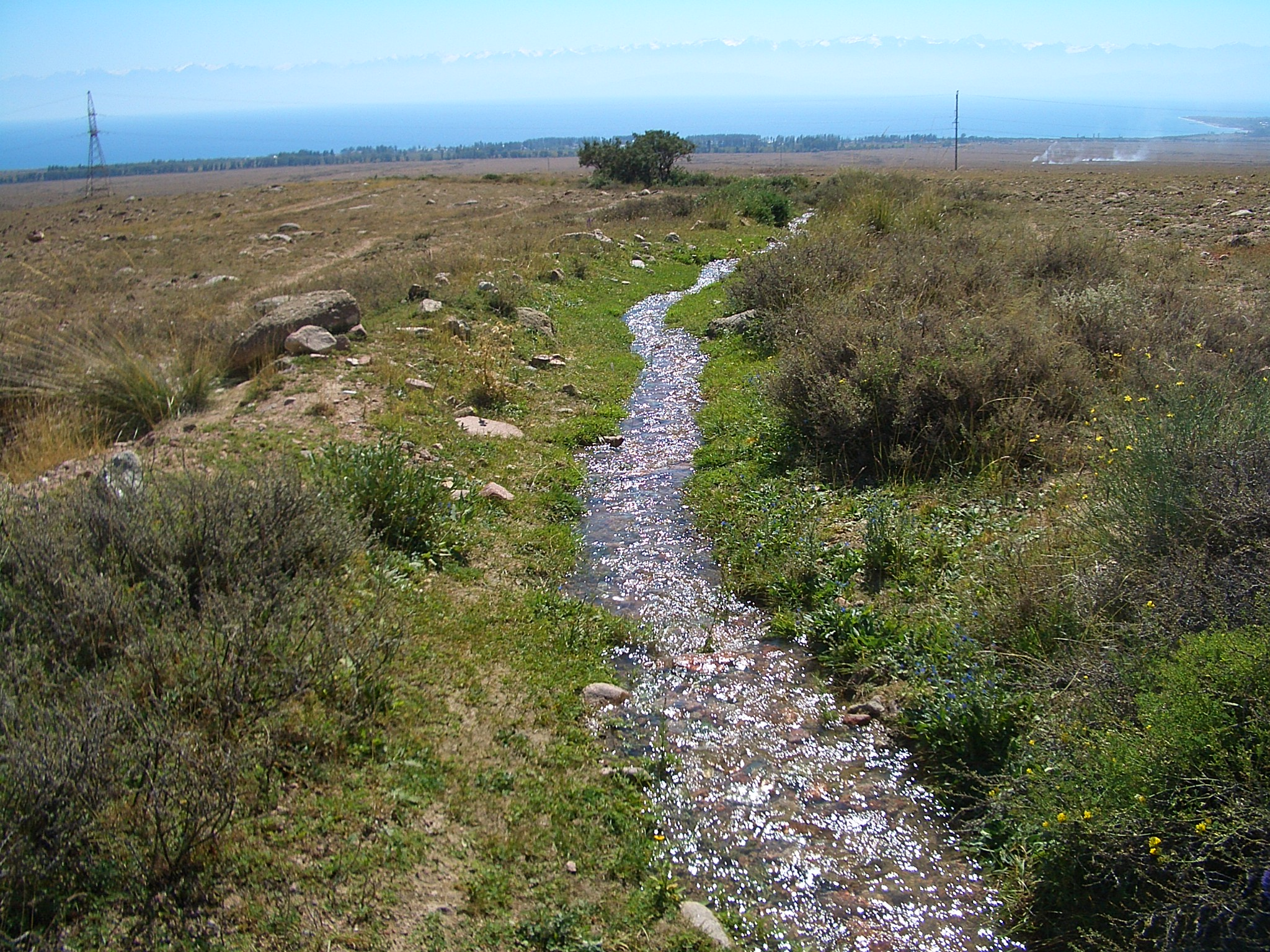
A creek at Tamchy, Kyrgyzstan, has been artificially redirected to this new course, locally known as an aryk

In Central Asia, an aryk (Turkic: arıq; Russian: арык) is a relatively small aqueduct supporting agriculture and providing water to inhabitants of the area.

Many places in Central Asia have the word "aryk" in their names:.

== See also ==
- Qanat (käriz)
