= Saryagash =

Saryagash Сарыағаш, Saryağaş
- Location in Kazakhstan
- Country: Kazakhstan
- Region: Turkistan Region

Population (2009)
  - Total: 38,848

Saryagash (Kazakh: Сарыағаш, Saryağaş) is a town and the administrative center of Saryagash District in Turkistan Region of southern Kazakhstan. Population: 38,848 (2009 census results); 25,914 (1999 census results).

It is located on the border with Uzbekistan, and is roughly 25 kilometres (16 mi) from Uzbekistan's capital Tashkent.
