= Subspecies of Phasianus colchicus =

List of subspecies of the common pheasant

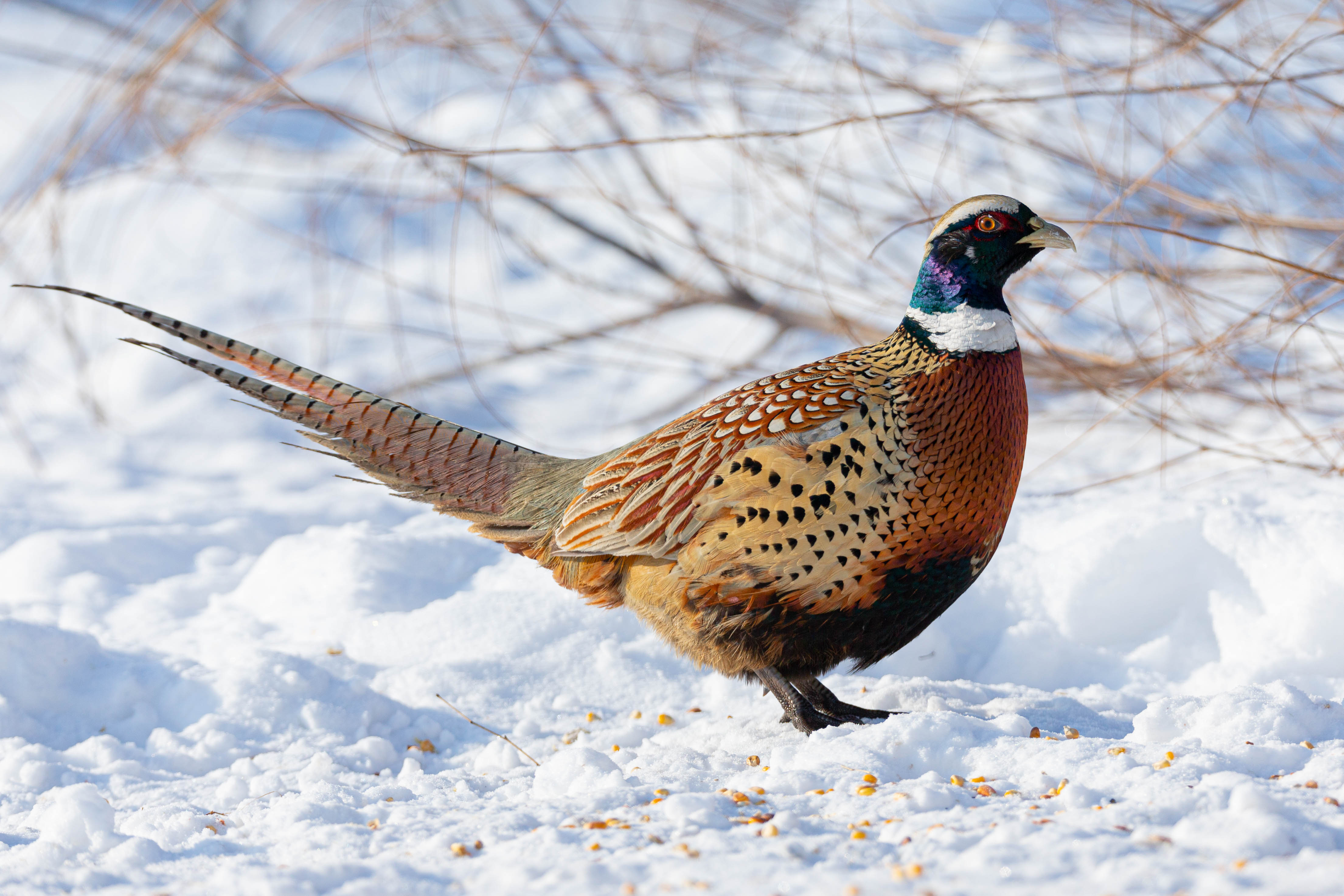
Phasianus colchicus pallasi, Birobidzhan, Jewish Autonomous Oblast, Russia

About 30 subspecies of the common pheasant (Phasianus colchicus) are currently recognised by major ornithological authorities, revealing pronounced geographic variation within this species.

The geographic variation is particularly evident in the male plumage colouration. At the western limits of the species' native range, subspecies lack a white neck collar and exhibit a strong reddish overall plumage tone that extends to the rump and upper tail coverts ("red-rumped pheasants"). In these subspecies, black-and-white markings are present but less conspicuous. At the eastern limits of the species' range, subspecies possess a pronounced white neck collar and display a contrasting plumage pattern of yellow and red areas bearing prominent black and white markings, while the rump and upper tail coverts are greyish with bright orange patches on either side ("grey-rumped pheasants"). Along the eastern margins of the Qinghai-Tibet Plateau (Hengduan Mountains, Min Mountains, Qinling Mountains and Qaidam Basin), several subspecies exhibit a blue-green chest colouration of varying intensity. This differs markedly from their counterparts farther east, where a copper-red chest colour dominates. In northern Central Asia, males exhibit a strong purple-greenish gloss in their plumage and possess a well-developed white neck collar. In southern Central Asia, the plumage is characterised by striking golden-and-black contrasts and white wing coverts, while the white neck collar is strongly reduced or absent. The transition between red-rumped and grey-rumped pheasants occurs at the eastern end of the Tarim Basin. The presence or absence of white superciliary stripes tends to correlate with the presence or absence of a white neck collar. Subspecies differentiation has occurred both through the isolation of populations in riverine or oasis habitats by deserts and semi-deserts, and through the formation of mountain barriers.

== Overview ==
Subspecies of Phasianus colchicus are native to a range extending from the Caucasus and Central Asia to eastern China. They occur across the lower mid-latitudes of Eurasia, where they are widespread in shrubland near forest edges and openings, near watercourses and reservoirs, and in agricultural fields, or are sparsely distributed in desert and semi-desert areas, where they occur in tugay forests along rivers and near oases. They occur both in plains and on montane slopes. In winter, they are restricted to areas with no snow or snow cover of less than 10–20 cm on the ground. Several subspecies have been widely introduced outside their native range, where they freely hybridise. Reintroductions into native areas pose serious problems, as hybrid pheasants genetically swamp native populations, leading locally to their extinction. Native forms highly endangered by this process include, for example, all Caucasus subspecies and the subspecies in Taiwan.

The considerable geographic variation of the common pheasant has long attracted ornithologists. Early reviews were provided by William Robert Ogilvie-Grant, by Sergei Buturlin, and by Sergei Alphéraky and Valentin Bianchi. Detailed revisions were offered by Ernst Hartert, and by William Beebe. The Soviet perspective was detailed in influential works by Sergei Buturlin and Georgi Dementiev, the Chinese perspective by the seminal work of Zuoxin Zheng (Tso-hsin Cheng). Several more recent books and reviews provide detailed accounts of plumage colouration and geographic variability in the Common Pheasant.

== Accepted subspecies ==
This article follows the taxonomy of IOC World Bird List (version 15.1).

| Subspecies | Authority | Native distribution |
|---|---|---|
1. Red-rumped pheasants
Black-necked Pheasants
| P. c. colchicus | Linnaeus, 1758 | Caucasus (Georgia, Azerbaijan, and adjacent areas in Armenia and Iran), Nestos delta in Greece |
| P. c. septentrionalis | Lorenz, 1889 | N slopes of Caucasus and W coast of Caspian Sea (Russia) |
| P. c. talischensis | Lorenz, 1889 | SW coast of Caspian Sea (Azerbaijan, Iran) |
| P. c. persicus | Severtsov, 1874 | SE coast of Caspian Sea (Iran) and SW Turkmenistan |
White-winged Pheasants
| P. c. principalis | Sclater, 1885 | SE Turkmenistan, far NE Iran, and NW Afghanistan |
| P. c. zarudnyi | Buturlin, 1904 | central valleys of the Amu Darya river on the E Turkmenistan–Uzbekistan border |
| P. c. zerafschanicus | Tarnovski, 1893 | Bukhara and valley of Zerafshan river in S Uzbekistan |
| P. c. chrysomelas | Severtsov, 1874 | Amu Darya delta, in W Uzbekistan and adjacent N Turkmenistan |
| P. c. bianchii | Buturlin, 1904 | upper valley of the Amu Darya in S Uzbekistan, SW Tajikistan, and extreme N Afghanistan |
| P. c. shawii | Elliot, 1870 | valleys of Kashgar Daria and Yarkand Daria E to Hotan Daria, lower Aksu and upper Tarim |
Kyrghyz Pheasants
| P. c. turcestanicus | Lorenz, 1896 | Syr Darya valley in S Kazakhstan SE to Fergana Basin in E Uzbekistan and borders of Kyrgyzstan |
| P. c. mongolicus | Brandt, 1844 | N Tian Shan in N Kyrgyzstan northward to Balkhash Lake, and eastward to NW Xinjiang and Urumchi |
Tarim Pheasants
| P. c. tarimensis | Pleske, 1889 | valleys of the lower Tarim, Cherchen Daria, Lake Bagratsch-kul and Lob-nor |
2. Grey-rumped pheasants
Yunnan Pheasants
| P. c. elegans | Elliot, 1870 | W Sichuan to NW Yunnan, NE Myanmar and E Tibet |
| P. c. rothschildi | La Touche, 1922 | mountains of SE Yunnan and adjacent parts of N Tonkin |
Western Grey-rumped Pheasants
| P. c. vlangalii | Przevalski, 1876 | E Qaidam basin between the South Koko-nor and Burchan Budda ranges (Burhan Budai Shan) |
| P. c. suehschanensis | Bianchi, 1906 | NW Sichuan south of the Minshans |
| P. c. strauchi | Przevalski, 1876 | Gansu, north to the Datong River, east to C and S Shaanxi, south into NE Sichuan |
| P. c. sohokhotensis | Buturlin, 1908 | Sohokhoto Oasis (Minqin County), and possibly northern foothills of Qilian Shan |
| P. c. satscheuensis | Pleske, 1892 | extreme W Gansu north of the Nanshan |
| P. c. edzinensis | Sushkin, 1926 | valley of the Edzin-gol |
| P. c. alaschanicus | Alferaki & Bianchi, 1908 | oases near the W foothills of the middle Helanshan |
| P. c. kiangsuensis | Buturlin, 1904 | W Hebei, Shanxi, N Shaanxi, and adjacent Inner Mongolia west to Ordos plateau |
Eastern Grey-rumped Pheasants
| P. c. hagenbecki | Rothschild, 1901 | Kobdo valley in W Mongolia |
| P. c. pallasi | Rothschild, 1903 | SE Siberia from the upper Amur and Ussuriland south to N Korean Peninsula |
| P. c. karpowi | Buturlin, 1904 | S Manchuria and N Liaoning to N Hebei, Beijing, Korea and Jeju Island |
| P. c. torquatus | Gmelin, 1789 | E China (Hebei and Shandong) to Vietnam border. |
| P. c. takatsukasae | Delacour, 1927 | S Guangxi and NE Vietnam (Tonkin) |
| P. c. decollatus | Swinhoe, 1870 | Sichuan to NW Hunan, SW Henan, NE Yunnan, and Guizhou |
Taiwan Pheasants
| P. c. formosanus | Elliot, 1870 | Taiwan |

Apart from Albania, Montenegro, and Bulgaria, where native populations are now genetically extinct, the following countries host native subspecies of Phasianus colchicus:

| Countries | # ssp. | Subspecies |
|---|---|---|
| Greece, Turkey, Armenia, Georgia | 1 | P. c. colchicus |
| Azerbaijan | 3 | P. c. colchicus, P. c. septentrionalis, P. c. talischensis |
| Russia | 2 | P. c. septentrionalis, P. c. pallasi |
| Iran | 4 | P. c. colchicus, P. c. talischensis, P. c. persicus, P. c. principalis |
| Afghanistan | 2-3 | P. c. principalis, P. c. bainchii, P. c. zarudnyi ?, likely all extinct |
| Turkmenistan | 4 | P. c. persicus, P. c. principalis, P. c. chrysomelas, P. c. zarudnyi |
| Uzbekistan | 5 | P. c. chrysomelas, P. c. zarudnyi, P. c. zerafschanicus, P. c. bianchii, P. c. turcestanicus |
| Tajikistan | 3 | P. c. bianchii, P. c. zerafschanicus, P. c. turcestanicus |
| Kyrgyzstan | 2-3 | P. c. turcestanicus, P. c. mongolicus, P. c. bianchii ? |
| Kazakhstan | 3 | P. c. septentrionalis, P. c. turcestanicus, P. c. mongolicus |
| Mongolia | 2 | P. c. hagenbecki, P. c. pallasi |
| North Korea, South Korea | 2 | P. c. karpowi, P. c. pallasi |
| China | 18 | P. c. mongolicus, P. c. shawii, P. c. tarimensis, P. c. vlangalii, P. c. satscheuensis, P. c. edzinensis, P. c. sohokhotensis, P. c. alaschanicus, P. c. strauchi, P. c. kiangsuensis, P. c. suehschanensis, P. c. elegans, P. c. rothschildi, P. c. decollatus, P. c. takatsukasae, P. c. torquatus, P. c. karpowi, P. c. pallasi |
| Taiwan | 1 | P. c. formosanus |
| Vietnam | 3-4 | P. c. takatsukasae, P. c. torquatus, P. c. rothschildi, P. c. elegans ? |
| Laos ? | 0-2 | P. c. rothschildi ?, P. c. elegans ? |
| Myanmar | 1 | P. c. elegans |

== Subspecies accounts ==
Traditionally, the common pheasant is divided into a Western red-rumped subspecies group and an Eastern grey-rumped subspecies group. The dividing line runs in a north–south direction across the eastern end of the Tarim Basin. The Tarim pheasant shows intermediate rump colouration; however, it is more closely related to the red-rumped group. Within these two large groups, there are several well-defined subgroups. Subspecies within each subgroup are more closely related to each other than to those of other subgroups, and typically show various degrees of clinal geographic variation.

According to various mDNA studies, the Western group of subspecies of the common pheasant is phylogenetically distinct from all pheasants in the Eastern group, forming a clade. Within the grey-rumped Eastern group, the elegans-group (consisting of P. c. elegans and P. c. rothschildi) is basal to all other subspecies within this group. Recent phylogenetic studies suggest that the Elegans-group may, in fact, be basal to all other subspecies groups of the common pheasant; otherwise, the Eastern and Western groups are phylogenetically well supported. The classification below follows the traditional classification scheme. The green pheasant Phasianus versicolor replaces the common pheasant on the Japanese islands and is the sister species to the common pheasant. Historically, it was sometimes treated as a subspecies of the common pheasant; however, phylogenetic studies confirm that it is a separate species.

=== 1. Western group (Red-rumped pheasants) ===
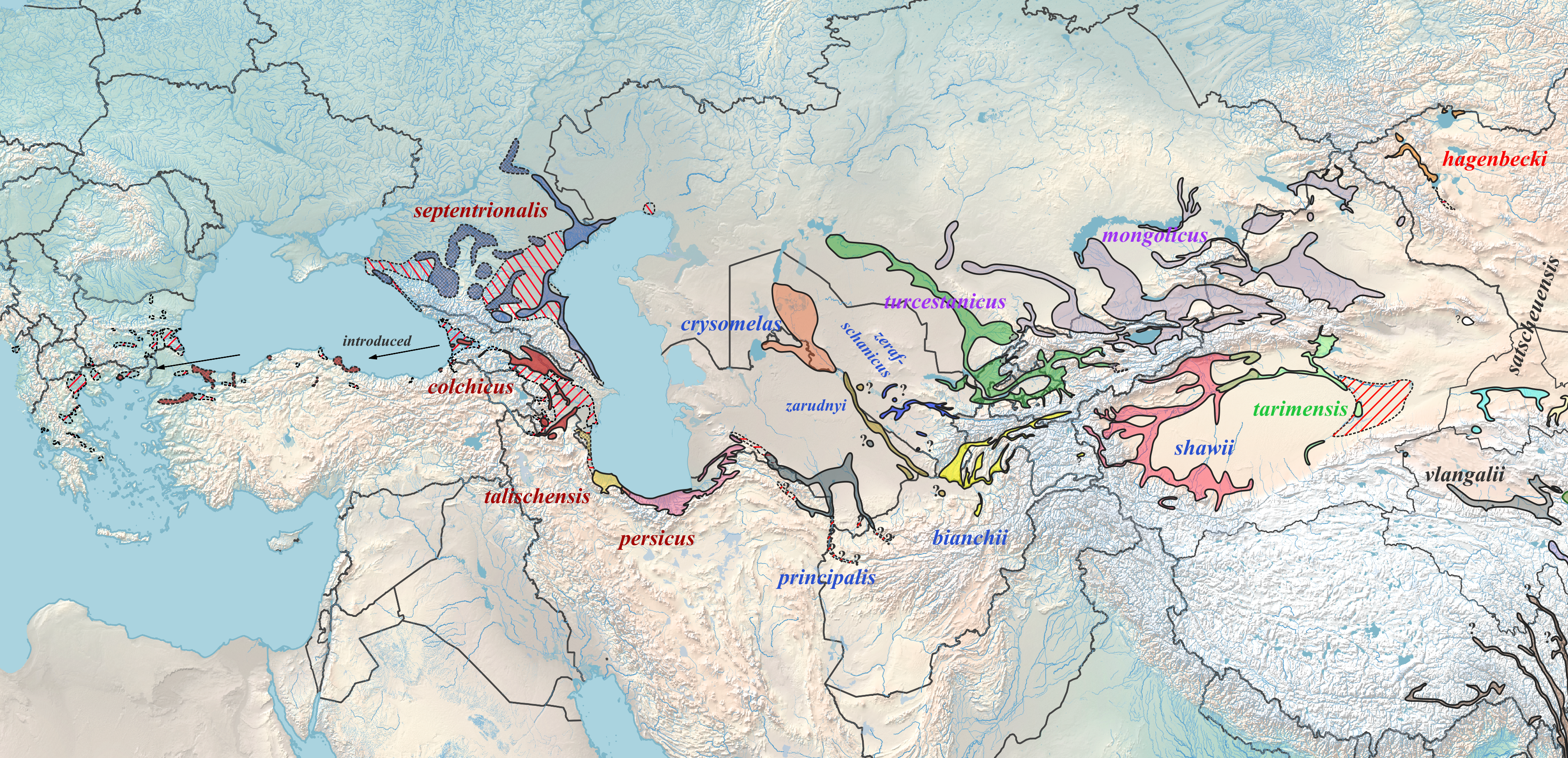
Distribution of the red-rumped subspecies of Phasianus colchicus.

The lower back, rump, and middle upper tail-coverts are generally coppery-red, bronze-red, maroon, or rusty-orange in colouration, sometimes tinged with green or glossed with an oily greenish sheen. The dark bars on the basal half of the tail are usually, but not always, very narrow (~2 mm). The lesser and median wing-coverts are sandy-brown, sandy-rufous, whitish, or white. There is never any trace of a white supercilium.

=== 1.1. Colchicus group (Black-necked pheasants) ===
This subspecies group includes the nominate form and is native to the Caucasus, extending north to the Volga delta and west along the Caspian coast to western Turkestan, with some isolated populations in coastal areas of the Black Sea and the Sea of Marmara in Turkey and in northeastern Greece (Nestos delta). Additional, now extinct, populations existed in Bulgaria, Greece, and in the border area between Albania and Montenegro. Whether these populations were introduced in ancient times by humans, or are remnants of native populations, remains unresolved and requires genetic study. Males of the black-necked pheasant group lack a neck ring; occasionally, small traces of white may be present in concealed parts of the neck feathers, but no white is visible externally. They have very prominent ear tufts. Characteristic of this group, the upper wing-coverts are buff-brown to rufous-brown (in P. c. persicus buffy white or light whitish-grey with a dun tint), with sparse shiny copper-red streaks. The rump and upper tail-coverts are copper-red to dark purple-red with a metallic sheen. The nape and foreback are golden-rufous to golden-orange with black edges and a terminal rod stripe on each feather; the sides of the body are golden-red or golden-orange with glossy black feather tips. When naturally arranged, the shoulder parts display a variegated, scaly appearance where the copper-red or dark rufous edges stand in sharp contrast to brown centers bordered by a pale ochre and black-brown stripe. The crop, chest, and breast are shiny copper-red (or golden-orange in P. c. persicus) with velvety-black terminal feather edges of varying widths. The belly is a matte copper-red or dark brown with a reddish tint, being half-bordered anteriorly by a strip of shiny tips from the adjacent breast feathers. The tail feathers are brownish-olive with copper-red edges and dark, sparse, narrow transverse stripes that widen toward the feather ends; the fanned edges feature a purple tint. The width of the black edges of the feathers of the back and crop, the color of their metallic sheen, and the shade of the belly vary significantly among the individual subspecies; the same holds for the colouration and shape of the upper chest feathers. Females have the upperparts dark greyish-rufous with a slight violet sheen, dark brown feather centres, and lighter streaked edges. The underparts are paler with sparse dark spotting on the crop and sides. The crop and foreparts are reddish-brown with a dark streaked rim. The chest has a reddish-violet sheen. Wing lengths of males average largest in P. c. septentrionalis (~252 mm) and P. c. colchicus (~248 mm), and considerably smaller in P. c. talischensis and P. c. persicus (~230–235 mm).

==== 1.1.1. Phasianus colchicus colchicus (Transcaucasian or Colchic black-necked pheasant) ====
Authority and original description: Linnaeus, C. 1758.

Type locality: Rioni/Phasis region (Eastern Caucasus).

Protonym and synonyms:

- Phasianus colchicus Linnaeus, 1758 — protonym
- Phasianus lorenzi Buturlin, 1904 — junior synonym
- Phasianus colchicus europaeus Hachisuka, 1937 — junior synonym

Local names: კოლხური ხოხობი (Georgian: Colchian Pheasant), Cənubi Qafqaz qırqovulu (Azerbaijani: South Caucasian Pheasant), Անդրկովկասյան փասիան (Armenian: Transcaucasian Pheasant), قرقاول ارسبارانی (Persian: Arasbarani Pheasant), Kafkas sülünü (Turkish: Caucasian Pheasant), Κολχικος Φασιανος (Greek: Colchian Pheasant), Колхидски фазан (Bulgarian: Colchian Pheasant), Закавказский фазан (Russian: Transcaucasian Pheasant)

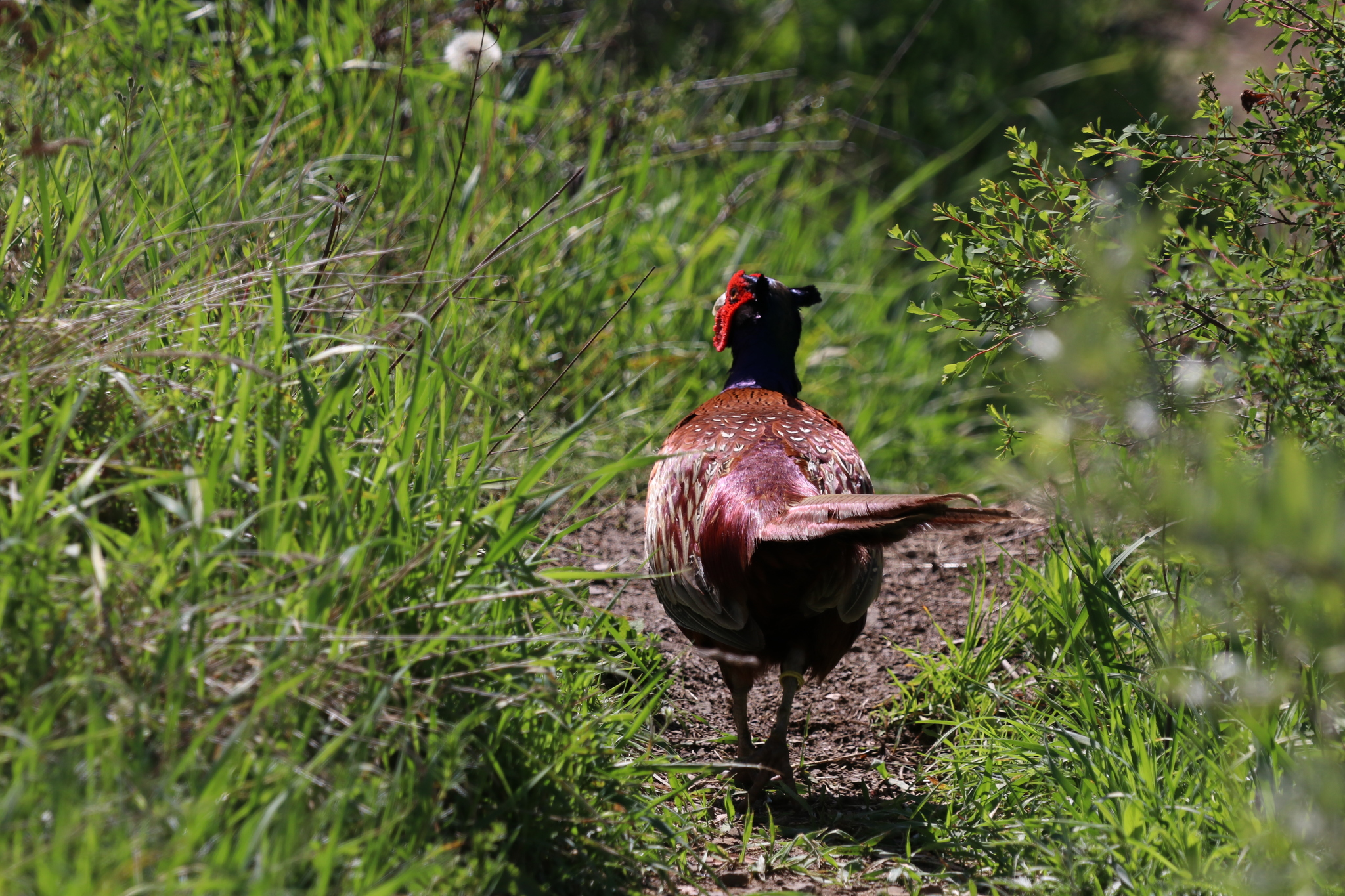
Phasianus colchicus colchicus, re-introduced in Old Tbilisi, Georgia, in 2025.

Description: The male has pale brown to buff upper wing-coverts and well-developed purplish tones, lacking any white on the neck and head. The upperparts are distinctly purple-violet with dark spotting and streaking, while the coppery-red underparts feature bold black margins reflecting a strong blue-violet gloss. The overall plumage character is coppery-red. The head and neck are bright metallic dark green, becoming bronze-green on the crown and purple-blue on the sides and front of the neck. The nape and upper back are glossy golden-orange, each feather with a narrow black margin and a black apical shaft streak. The shoulders show a black-and-cream mottled, scaly appearance. The lower back, rump, and upper tail-coverts are dark copper-red with a purple and/or gold tint depending on the viewing angle. The chest is glossy copper-orange, each feather with a broad (up to 2.5 mm wide) glossy black margin. The flanks are golden-orange with glossy black apical feather edges. A blue or violet gloss is prominent on the black markings of the mantle, breast, and flanks. The belly is matte blackish brown or dark chocolate, transitioning into chestnut on the undertail-coverts. The tail feathers are brownish-olive-ochre with copper-red edges and a purple-violet gloss; the central tail feathers have transverse black stripes, very narrow at the base and broader towards the tip. The female is generally sandy-brown on the head, neck, mantle, and sides of the chest, with black-brown feather centres and a reddish tinge with a faint purple tint. The flanks and upper tail-coverts show brown markings and ochreous mottling. The throat is pale reddish-ochreous. The breast and belly are pale reddish-brown, either unspotted or with faint kidney-shaped brown markings. The central tail feathers are reddish-brown with sandy-olive edges and irregular black-brown and ochreous transverse stripes. There is clinal variation within P. c. colchicus, with males in the eastern part of its range approaching P. c. talischensis in upper wing-covert, abdomen, and chest colouration.

Photographs: Photographs are available from Georgia (Kakhet'i region and Tbilisi), from the Nestos Delta in Greece, and from the Marmara Region in Turkey.

Measurements: Male wing length: Ogilvie-Grant: 257 mm; Hartert, Delacour: 238–256 mm; Dementyev: n = 3: 250–253 mm (mean 251 mm); Vaurie: n = 10: 235–255 mm (mean 245 mm).

Distribution: In the past, it ranged from Bulgaria and Greece through northern Turkey to Georgia (along the coast of the Black Sea, extending north to Sukhumi and south to Batumi), Azerbaijan, extreme southern Dagestan, Armenia, and northwestern Iran. It is generally assumed that the populations in Europe and Turkey west of the Chorokh Valley were introduced by humans from the Colchis region in ancient times, and that the subspecies' original range was restricted to the Caucasus. This notion is challenged by the fact that common pheasants where already present in a number of Neolithic settlements in Bulgaria (e.g., Mursalevo, Dolnoslav, Kazanlak, Galabovo, and Sozopol) during 6000–5000 BC. Today, only relict populations remain, and the survival of the nominate subspecies is highly threatened by the introduction of hunting pheasants, which genetically swamp the native form.

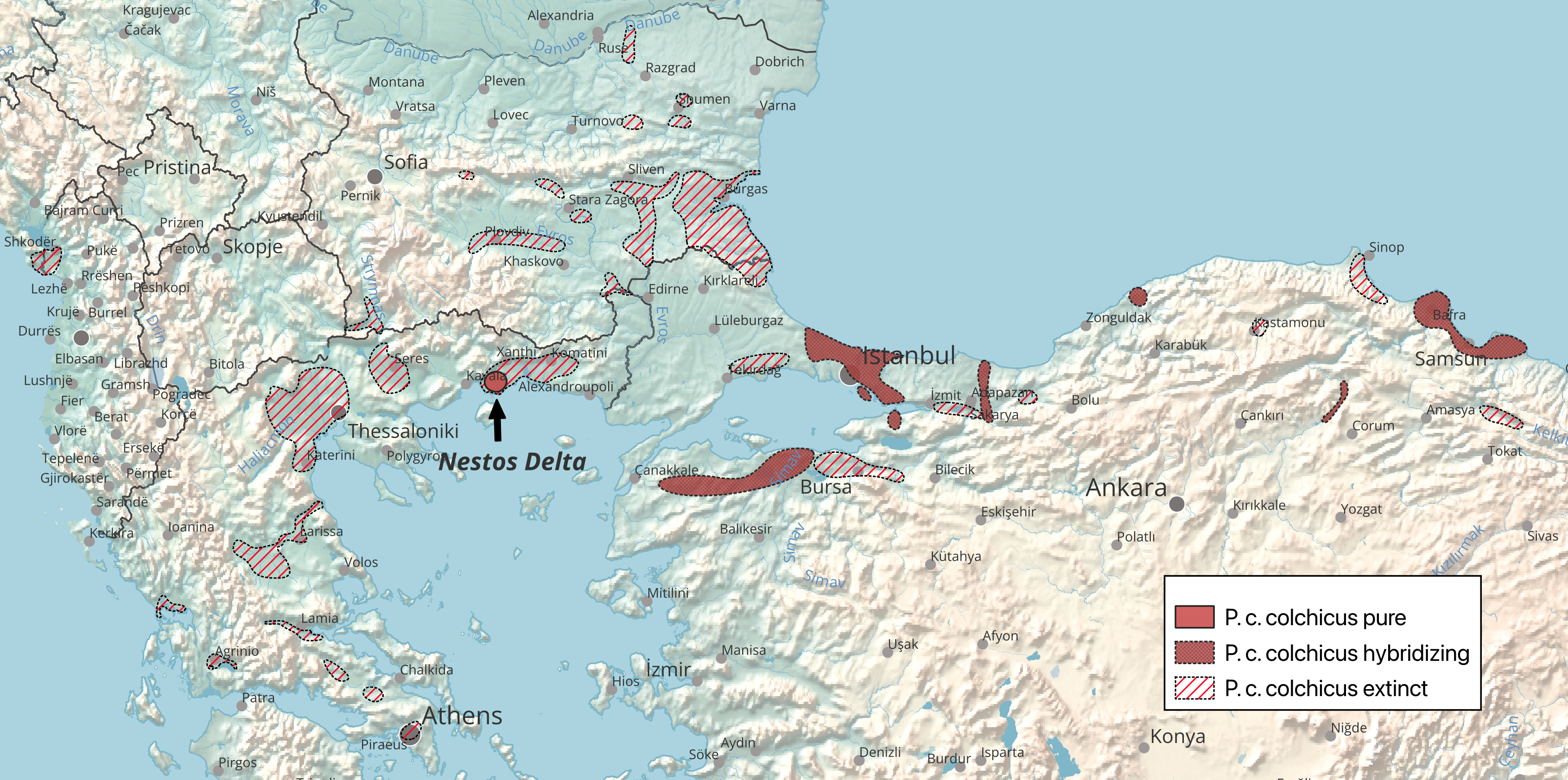
Historical and present distribution range of P. c. colchicus west of Samsun.

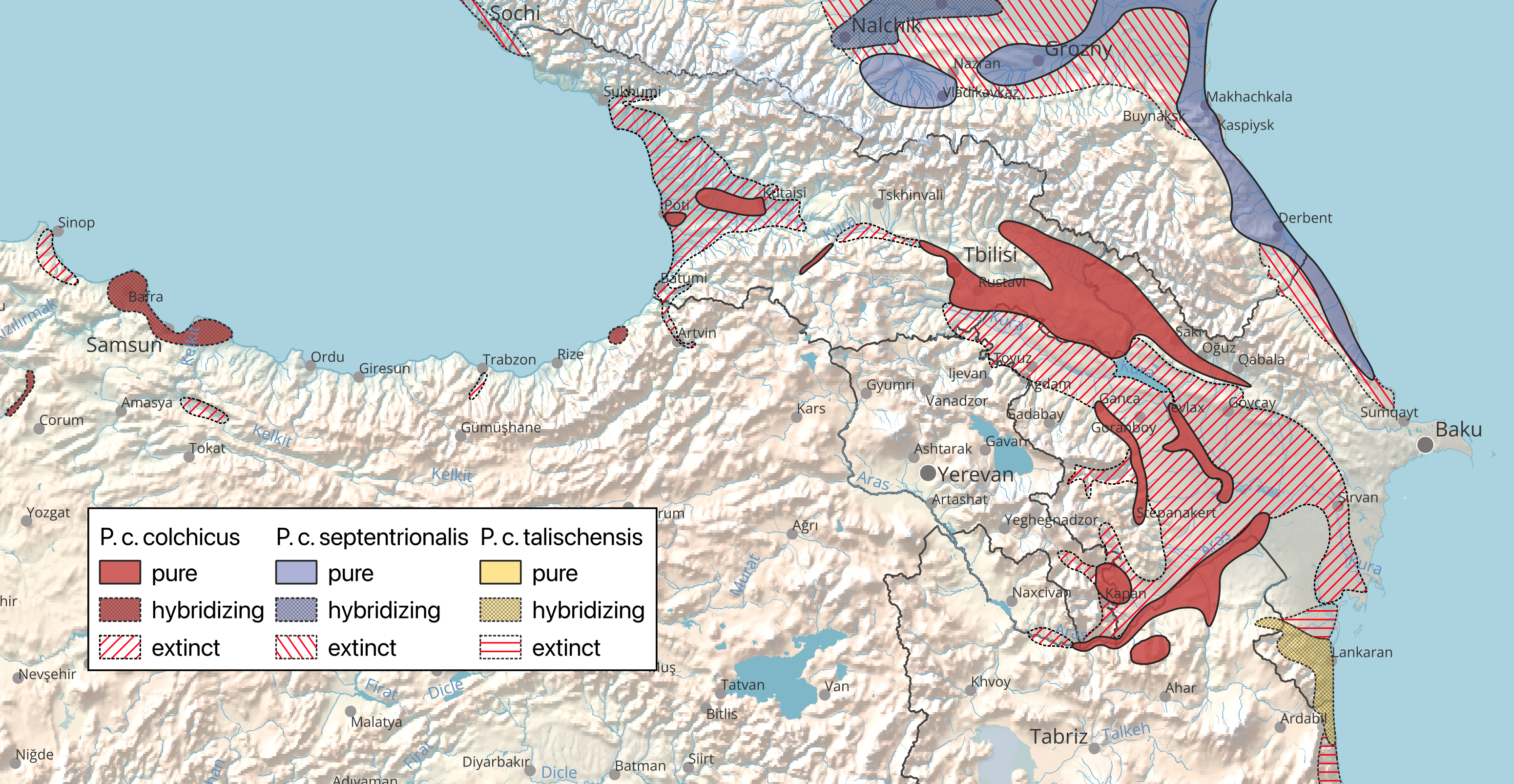
Historical and present distribution range of P. c. colchicus east of Samsun.

In the western part of its range, which extends from Greece to the Colchis Lowland, only a few native populations survive today. In the Colchis region, these are restricted to a small area within the Lake Paliastomi basin and the Rioni River basin. It does not ascend to the narrow valleys of the upper Rion. It is now extinct in the Rioni and Qvirila valleys above Kutaisi, in the Chorokh Valley of southern Georgia and extreme northeastern Turkey, as well as in the Kodori River valley of Abkhazia. In Turkey, relatively pure populations persist on the Black Sea coast in the Sinop–Samsun–Ünye region and near Trabzon. In the Marmara region of Turkey, in northeastern Greece (Macedonia and Thrace), and in southeastern Bulgaria (the Maritsa and Tundja basins), formerly pure populations have been lost through hybridisation following introductions from game farms and for hunting purposes. For example, P. c. torquatus was introduced into Bulgaria in 1895, and P. c. mongolicus on a large scale between 1962 and 1989, leading to the genetic extinction of the nominate form around 1990. An isolated population also existed on the border between Albania and Montenegro, south of Lake Skadar and east of Dulcigno (modern Ulcinj). The only genetically pure population in Europe appears to survive in the Kotza Orman (Κοτζά Ορμάν) riparian forest of the Nestos River delta in Greece (about 250 individuals, stable since 2012).

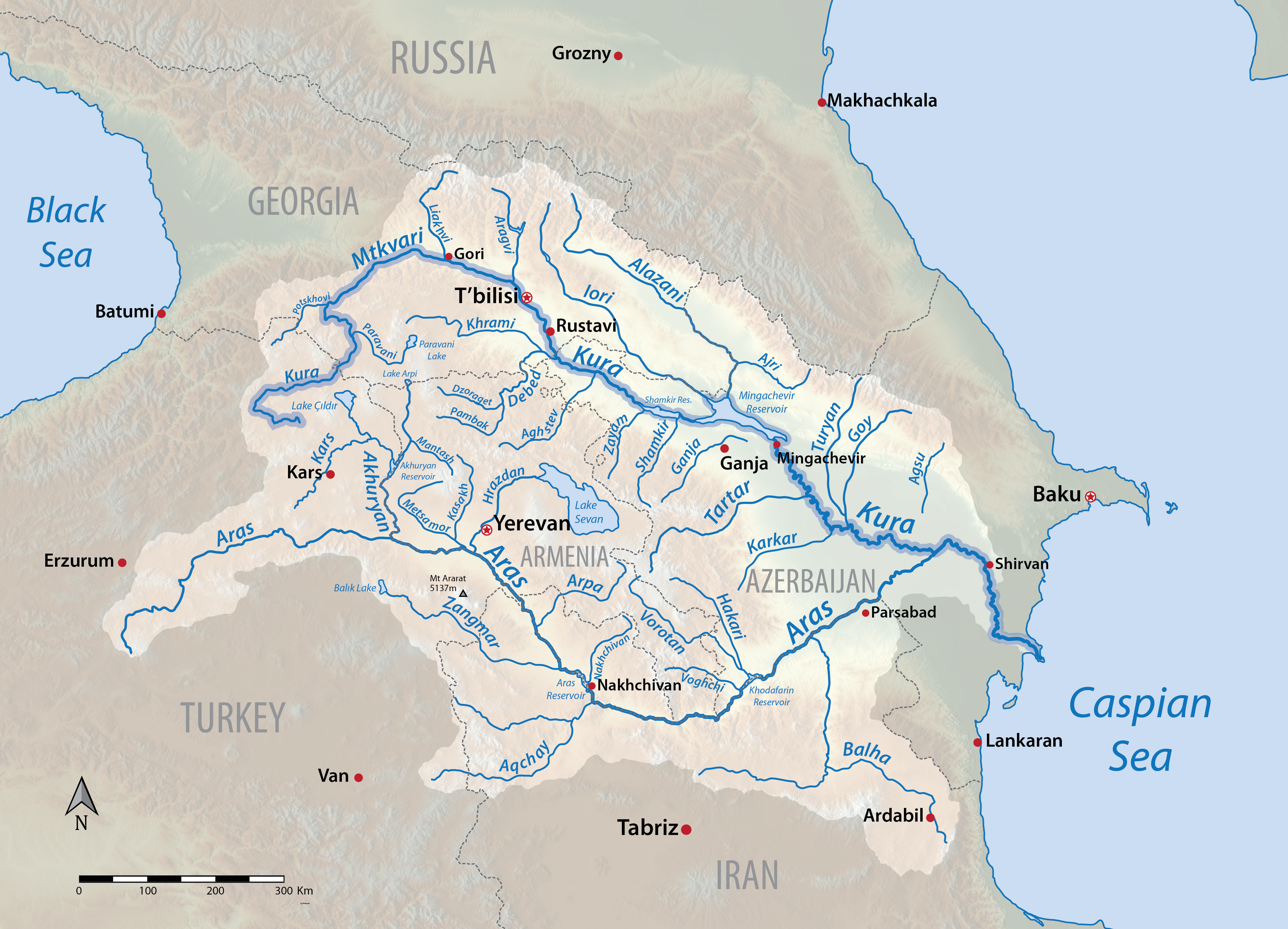
Kura-Aras river basin.

In the eastern part of its range, it is restricted to the basins of the Kura (Mtkvari), Iori, Alazani, lower Araks (Aras, Araz) rivers and their tributaries in Transcaucasia (Georgia, Azerbaijan, extreme southern Armenia, and northwestern Iran). Birds in the lower Kura and lower Araks basins refer to variant "lorenzi" according to Buturlin. In the Kura valley in Georgia, it ascends to about the Borjomi Gorge; it is rare above Gori in the Liakhvi Plains, more common in the lower Ksani and lower Aragvi valleys; in the Iori valley it does not reach the plains of Tianeti, along the Alazani river it occurs all the way to the Pankisi Gorge; in the Ayrichay (=Ajri) depression it ascends to Sheki, and further east to Agsu and Shamakhi. In Iran, small populations occur in the mountains of the protected Arasbaran area and the Kalibar Mountains, in the semi-arid northern parts of the Mughan Plain, and along the Aras River as far as Jolfa. In Armenia, it has been genetically swamped by hunting pheasants over most of its range; only small populations survive in the southern Araks valley along the border with Iran (around Shvanidzor) and near the border with Azerbaijan (Kapan, Yeghvardi, Nerkin Hand). Historically, in the Araks valley, P. c. colchicus never ascended much further than Ordubad (in Nakhichevan). It occurred only in the southern (and possibly extreme northeastern) parts of Armenia, particularly near the border regions with Iran and Azerbaijan. In Nagorno-Karabakh, it ascended the Tartar River valley to elevations of up to 1,500 m, reaching approximately the village of Hasanriz. In Azerbaijan, this subspecies is now extinct in the Kura–Araz Plain, the Lankaran Plain (including the Ghizil-Agaj State Reserve), the Samur–Shabran Plain, and the Nakhichivan–Arazboyu Plain; small populations survive in several nature reserves in the foothills of the Greater and Lesser Caucasus, including Gusar, Sheki, and Uludüz. Populations in the coastal lowlands of northeastern Azerbaijan (Quba–Khachmaz) are of uncertain subspecific status (P. c. septentrionalis vs. P. c. colchicus), but likely belong to P. c. septentrionalis.

Habitat: Open deciduous riverine forests with dense undergrowth intertwined with thorny climbing plants; thickets of oleaster. On the Black Sea coast, it occurs in coastal forests, pseudo-maquis and heathlands from sea level to 400 m. In the Rioni River valley, it populates natural forest clearings with a dense undergrowth of Smilax and Clematis. Along rivers such as Kura and Araks, it inhabits extensive and dense reed beds (Phragmites spp.), and thickets of brambles (Rubus spp.) interspersed with willows (Salix spp.) and tamarisks (Tamarix spp.), ascending to 750–880 m above sea level. In the Kapan region, it occurs in oak forests with dense understorey and adjacent open shrublands (Quercus spp., Carpinus spp., Corylus spp., Paliurus spp.), at elevations of about 800–1,000 m. It may also occur seasonally in grain fields, maize fields, and tea plantations. In the Tartar River valley, it ascends to elevations of up to 1,500 m.

==== 1.1.2. Phasianus colchicus septentrionalis (West Caspian or North Caucasian black-necked pheasant) ====
Authority and original description: Lorenz, T. K. 1888.

Type locality: North side of the Caucasus.

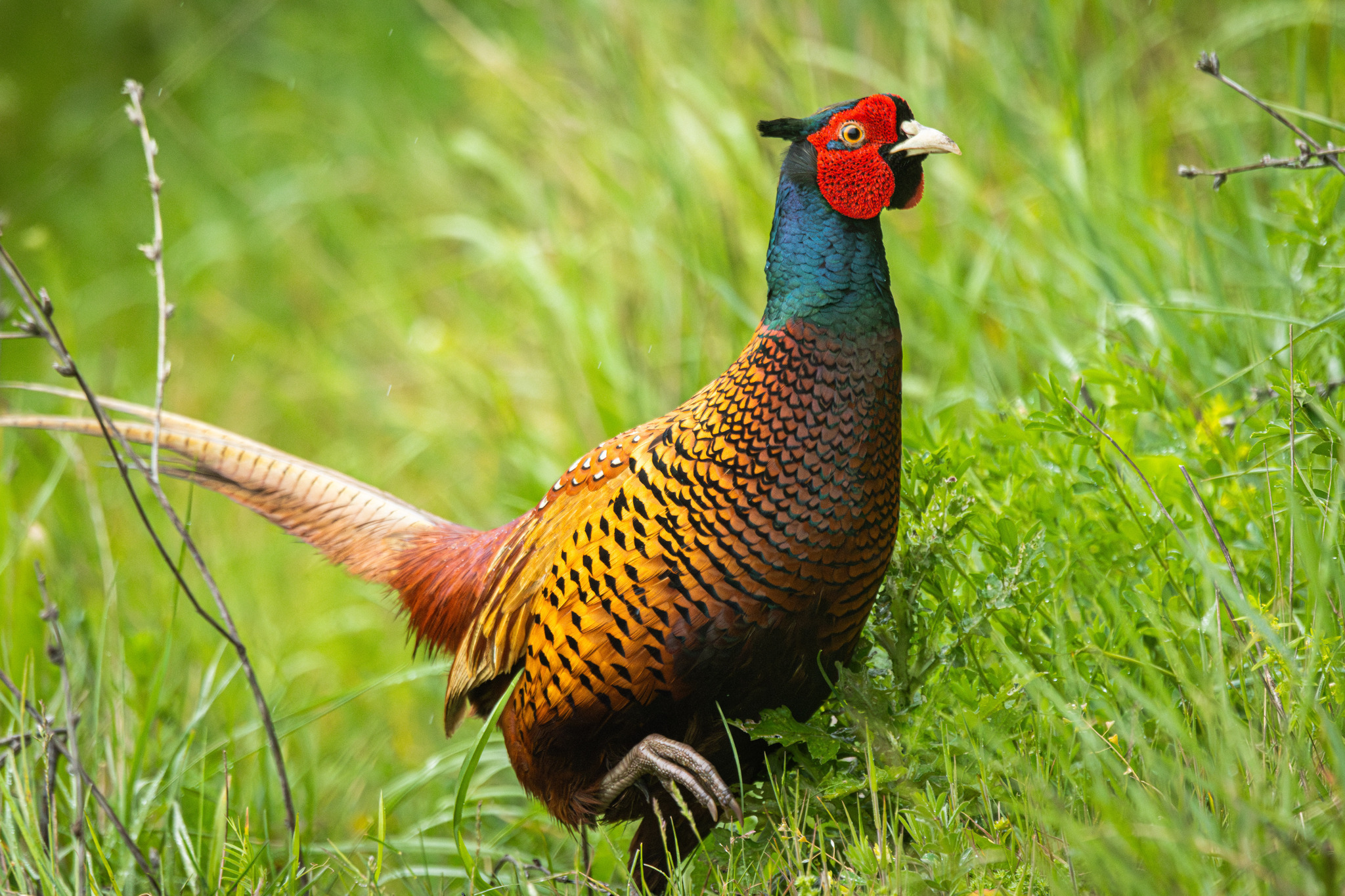
Phasianus colchicus septentrionalis, Predgorny District, Stavropol Krai, Russia

Protonym and synonyms:

- Phasianus septentrionalis Lorenz, T. K. 1888 — protonym

Local names: Şimali Qafqaz qırqovulu (Azerbaijani: North Caucasian Pheasant), Северокавказский фазан (Russian: North Caucasian Pheasant)

Description: This subspecies is similar to P. c. colchicus, but males are generally paler, less heavily marked with purplish black above, and less barred with purplish blue below, with general colouring characterised as golden-red or golden-orange rather than the deep coppery-red of the nominate form. The black feather margins on the breast and sides lack purple-blue tones, showing instead a prominent dark green gloss. Similarly, the upper mantle and lower back display less purple or violet-purplish sheen than seen in nominal P. c. colchicus. The margins of the central tail feathers are not pure purple or copper-red, but grey-reddish, appearing greenish when positioned away from direct light, while the outer vanes display a distinct greenish-purple sheen. Anteriorly, the front of the black belly is typically characterised by a prominent green gloss. Females are also noticeably paler than those of nominal P. c. colchicus.

Photographs: Photographs are available from Pyatigorsk, from North Ossetia, from Chechnya, from Dagestan, and from the Volga basin.

Measurements: Male wing length: Hartert, Delacour: n = 8: 242–255 mm; Dementyev: n = 13: 250–267 mm (mean 258.5 mm).

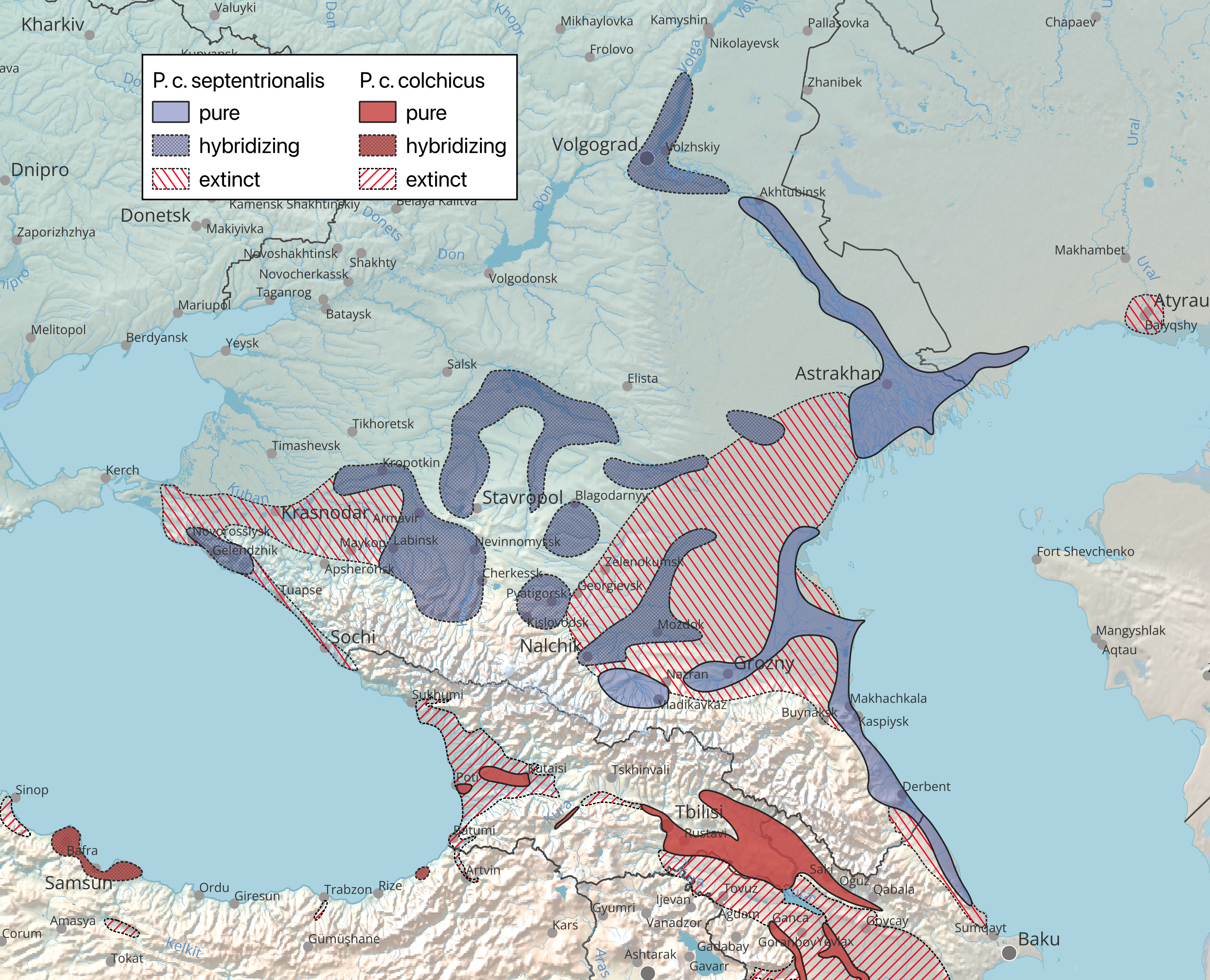
Historical (late 19th century) and present distribution range of P. c. septentrionalis.

Distribution: North Caucasus, including the basins of the Kuma, Terek, Sulak, and Kuban rivers, and the lower reaches of the Samur River; from Dagestan north to the Volga Delta (formerly also Ural Delta, where it is now extinct), south to northern slope of the Greater Caucasus and along the Caspian Sea coast at least as far as the Samur valley (possibly even to Absheron Peninsula). In the 18th and 19th centuries, P. c. septentrionalis was considerably more widespread; it was reported from the eastern Azov region and the lower Don, from the lower Ural River possibly as far as the Orenburg region, from the lower Uzen River in the southeastern Trans-Volga Saratov region, from the Sarpinsky Lakes, and from the lower reaches of the Yeruslan River on the left bank of the Volga. In the second half of the 19th century and the first half of the 20th century, the subspecies' range in southern Russia was sharply reduced due to overhunting. Formerly, it also occurred as far as the mouth of the Kuban River, but by the early 20th century it had been extirpated along the entire Black Sea coast. Various hybrid forms ("hunting pheasants") were released in hunting grounds in the Rostov and Volgograd regions, as well as in Kabardino–Balkaria, leading to their partial assimilation by the North Caucasian subspecies and contamination of its genotype; hunting pheasants also spread into the Rostov region from the Luhansk region via the Seversky Donets valley. Breeding programmes aimed at restoring the native population have been conducted since 1958 at the Maykop (Kuzhorsky) Pheasant Farm and in Astrakhan, with mass releases in the Krasnodar and Rostov regions, along the Don and Volga rivers, at various localities along the Black Sea coast, and in North Ossetia. The current distribution is highly fragmented, with remnant pure populations surviving mainly in eastern Ciscaucasia (populations in all western Ciscaucasia are hybrids to varying degrees and often show white neck-rings). Possible pure populations may persist in the central Volga Delta and in the lower Terek Valley, where hunting pheasants were probably never released, as well as in the "Steppe Pearl" protected area in Chechnya and in the lower reaches of the Samur River. Large spatio-temporal fluctuations in distribution occur due to flooding and other environmental factors. Since the beginning of the 21st century, sporadic observations have been reported along the Caspian coast north of the Volga Delta, including near the village of Zaburunye and even in the vicinity of Atyrau. The wild population is highly endangered by introduced hunting pheasants, which threaten to genetically swamp the native form. P. c. septentrionalis is currently listed in the Red Book of the Republic of Ingushetia, the Red Book of the Chechen Republic, the Red Book of the Karachay–Cherkess Republic, and the Red Book of the Kabardino–Balkarian Republic.

Habitat: Mosaic floodplain landscapes along riverbanks and islands, in dense thickets of willow, sea-buckthorn, and oleaster, along floodplain groves, in blackthorn scrub, reed beds, and along forest edges. In the floodplain forests of the Terek River, grey alder (Alnus incana), white poplar (Populus alba), and oak (Quercus robur) are accompanied by an undergrowth of hazel (Corylus avellana), warty spindle tree (Euonymus verrucosus), black elder (Sambucus nigra), blackthorn (Prunus spinosa), and sea-buckthorn (Hippophae rhamnoides), with a ground layer of reed (Phragmites australis), blackberry (Rubus caesius), reed grass (Calamagrostis arundinacea), ostrich fern (Matteuccia struthiopteris), and butterbur (Petasites albus); numerous islands and springs in these areas constitute the main habitat. It often prefers reed beds on islands, riverbanks, levees, or floodplain embankments, as well as steppe gullies and shelterbelts; it also inhabits artificial forest plantations in steppe regions where natural ponds or watering points are present. In mountainous areas, it is common for valleys to be greatly narrowed and surrounded by high mountains, up to about 600–800 m above sea level. It avoids open ground, but in late summer and autumn it may enter maize and other cultivated areas. It has been recorded along river valleys at elevations of up to 300 m along the Pshekha River in the western Krasnodar Territory, up to 450–550 m along the Belaya River, up to 700 m along the Kuban River, up to 950 m along the Podkumok River, and up to 1,000 m along the Chegem Gorge. To the north, its distribution is limited by snow cover not exceeding an average depth of 10–20 cm; during particularly severe winters with heavy snowfall, local population crashes are common.

==== 1.1.3. Phasianus colchicus talischensis (South Caspian or Talysh black-necked pheasant) ====
Authority and original description: Lorenz, T.K. 1888.

Type locality: Lenkoran (today in Azerbaijan, formerly in the Talysh Khanate).

Protonym and synonyms:

- Phasianus persicus talischensis Lorenz, T. K. 1888 — protonym

Local names: Talış qırqovulu (Azerbaijani: Talysh Pheasant), قرقاول تالشی (Persian: Talysh Pheasant), قرقاول گیلان (Persian: Gilan Pheasant), Талышский фазан (Russian: Talysh Pheasant)

Description: This subspecies represents an intermediate form between P. c. colchicus and P. c. persicus. Males feature a distinct purplish-carmine or purplish red-bronze colouration across the mid-breast and sides of the belly. Compared to P. c. colchicus, the crop and chest feathers are narrower, more pointed apically, and display a deep apical notch with narrow black margins glossed with dark purplish-blue; compared to P. c. persicus, however, they are less pointed and more shallowly emarginated, forming a clear structural progression between the forms. The upper wing-coverts are frequently darker than in nominal P. c. colchicus, and consistently, significantly darker than the sandy-buff coverts of P. c. persicus, exhibiting a sandy-brown or reddish sandy-brown colouration. The abdomen—which is frequently fox-red, brick-red, or rusty-red rather than uniformly blackish-brown—is bordered anteriorly by a brilliant, shiny purple-coppery-red band. On the upperparts, P. c. talischensis differs from P. c. persicus by its darker colouration and a rump that is darker with a more pronounced purplish tone and purplish-lake gloss. The crop and flanks are lighter compared to P. c. colchicus and P. c. septentrionalis, without a copper-red or purple shade; the mantle and flanks are darker than in P. c. persicus, showing a more pronounced golden-orange rather than golden-yellow cast. Females are similar to the nominal female but range from being slightly to noticeably darker brown overall.

Photographs: Photographs are available from Gilan.

Measurements: Male wing length: Hartert, Delacour: n = 2: 237–240 mm (mean 238.5 mm); Kayvanfar et al.: n = 15: 222.0 ± 9 mm.

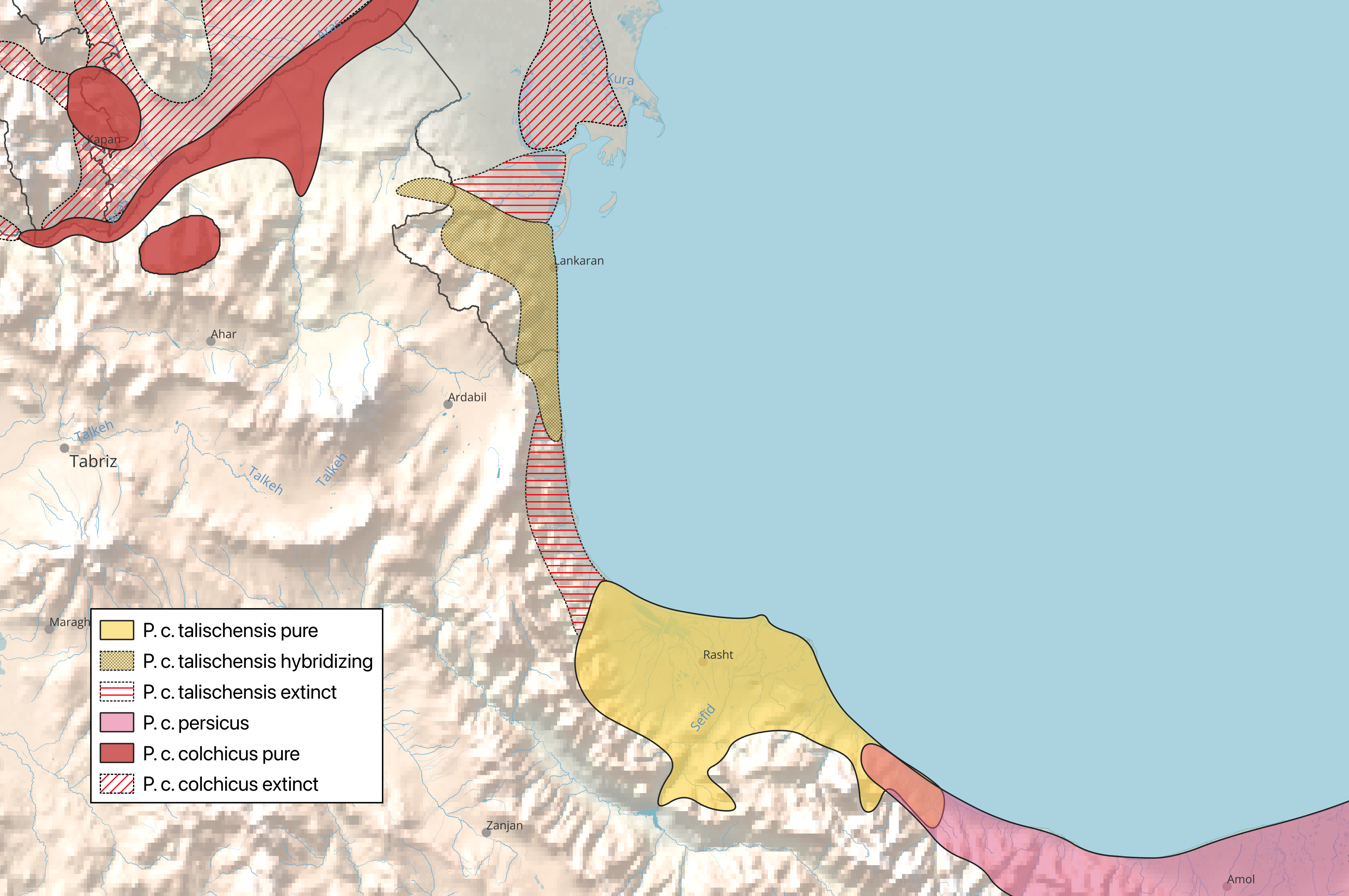
Historical and present distribution range of P. c. talischensis.

Distribution: Northern slopes of the Elburz Mountains and the Caspian lowlands of Iran (Gilan). Until the 1950s, its distribution also included the Lenkoran Plain, the Salyan Plain (where it came into contact with P. c. colchicus), and the foothills of the Talysh Mountains in Azerbaijan. It was also introduced in the late 19th century on some islands of Kizyl-Agach Bay. In Azerbaijan, by the 1970s, it survived only in the middle and lower zones of the Talysh Mountains and along the border with Iran. Spring counts recorded 105 individuals in 1982, 25–31 individuals in 1993–1995, and 5–7 individuals in 2003–2005; in 2023, the population was estimated at no more than 50 pairs. In Iran, it remains present in the Talesh forests as far as Saravan and Deylaman, as well as in tea gardens and lowland areas such as the Jokundan wetland (near Saragah), the margins of the Anzali Lagoon, Bojaq (Buchag) Kiashahr National Park, the Astara Protected Region, and in Nahalestan. In western Mazandaran, between Ramsar and Chalus, a transition zone between P. c. talischensis and P. c. persicus occurs. P. c. talischensis is threatened by introduced ring-necked hunting pheasants, and a recent dramatic decline has also been reported in Gilan Province of Iran, partly attributed to invasive raccoons.

Habitat: Lowland forest (mainly small woodlands and marshy forest), dense reed beds, and blackberry thickets. It is absent from oak-hornbeam forests and foothill forests. It prefers forests with a canopy cover of 5–25%, typically with a dense shrub layer. Habitats are often located near grain fields, wet rice fields, or grape plantations (providing food) and near plantation forests (providing cover).

==== 1.1.4. Phasianus colchicus persicus (Persian black-necked pheasant) ====
Authority and original description: Severtsov, N.A. 1874.

Type locality: South shore of the Caspian Sea.

Protonym and synonyms:

- Phasianus persicus Severtsov, NA 1874 — protonym

Local names: قرقاول ایرانی (Persian: Persian Pheasant), قرقاول هیرکانی (Persian: Hyrcanian Pheasant), قرقاول خزری (Persian: Caspian Pheasant), قرقاول مازندرانی (Persian: Mazandaran Pheasant), قرقاولهای گلستان (Persian: Golestan Pheasant), Pars sülgüni (Turkmen: Persian Pheasant), Персидский фазан (Russian: Persian Pheasant)

Description: Males differ from those of the remaining subspecies in this group in having the lesser and median wing-coverts greyish, buffy white, or nearly white instead of brown to buff. Pure white in the neck plumage is generally absent or restricted to inconspicuous subterminal marks. The mantle, flanks, and upper chest exhibit a significantly stronger golden-yellow or golden-orange ground colour than in P. c. colchicus, appearing even lighter and more golden-toned than in P. c. septentrionalis. Morphologically, the flank feathers feature broad, highly golden anteapical bands and very broad black terminal margins glossed with purple-blue. The front chest feathers possess a wide wine-red basal band with a rusty tone and a very narrow black edge with blue gloss. The crop and breast feathers are lanceolate, narrowing toward the tip and finely bordered with black around their entire edge, even more pointed apically than in P. c. talischensis, and more deeply notched at the tip. The center of the belly is usually foxy brown, dark brownish, or matte copper-red, bordered anteriorly by a brilliant purple-red or purple-coppery-red band. On the lower back and upper tail-coverts, the metallic-green gloss is virtually absent on the anterior sections. Females are similar to the female of nominal P. c. colchicus, though frequently slightly paler or lighter in colour.

Photographs: Photographs are available from Mazandaran, and Golestan.

Measurements: Male wing length: Ogilvie-Grant: 236 mm; Hartert, Delacour: n = 5: 233–248 mm; Kayvanfar et al.: n = 54: 230.9 ± 11 mm; Aliakbari et al.: n = 22: 210–248 mm (mean 232 mm).

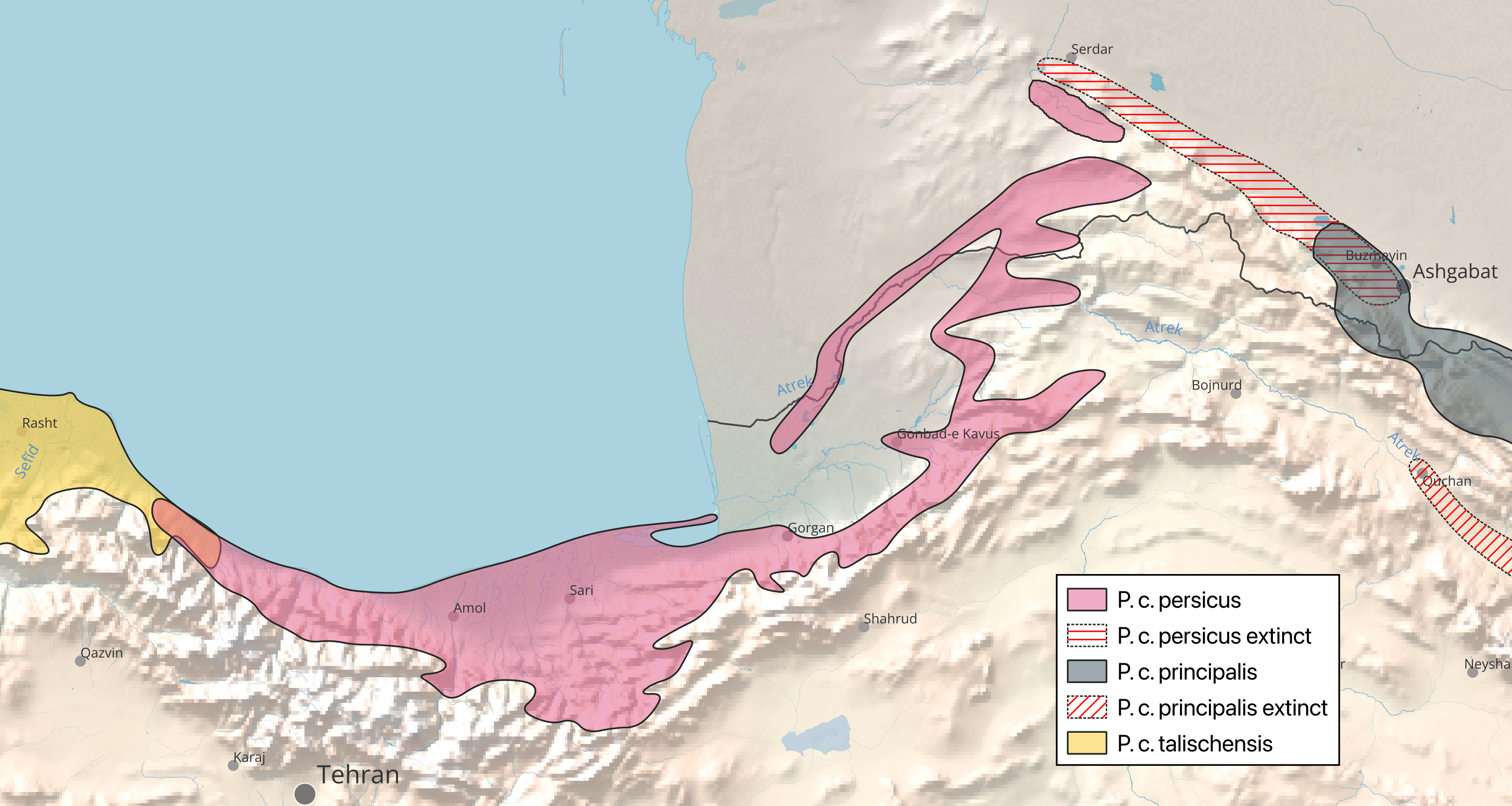
Historical and present distribution range of P. c. persicus.

Distribution: Southwest Turkmenistan (Sünt-Hasardag Nature Reserve and a breeding centre in Kara Kala) and north-central Iran (Mazandaran, Golestan, and North Khorasan in the western Kopetdag Mountains). It occurs in the lower reaches of the Gorganrud River, in the Chandyr and Sumbar river valleys, and very rarely in the lower Atrek valley. To the east, it does not extend beyond the watershed between the Atrek and Hari-rud valleys. The northern boundary of its distribution more or less coincides with the watershed between the Chandyr, Sumbar, and Atrek rivers and the rivers flowing northwards from Kopetdag; it reaches as far north as the Khodzakala valley. In the west, it meets the distribution range of P. c. talischensis between Ramsar and Chalus. Until about 1920, it also occurred in the Ashgabat and Gökdepe regions of Turkmenistan, where it was extirpated by hunting. Subsequently, P. c. principalis expanded its range northwards and now occupies these areas. Radde and Walter reported that common pheasants were present in the gardens of Quchan in 1886, although it is unclear whether these belonged to P. c. persicus or P. c. principalis.

Habitat: In Turkmenistan, it inhabits shrublands of the foothills and lower montane belt, remaining primarily in river valleys densely covered with reed beds and interspersed with clearings of tall grass. In areas near the headwaters of tributaries north of the Atrek, it occurs in extensive reed-covered plains, with the surrounding reed-free landscape resembling steppes similar in character to the slopes of the adjacent mountains. In Iran, it also inhabits lowland plains.

=== 1.2. Chrysomelas–principalis group (White-winged pheasants) ===
This group comprises subspecies distributed across the river basins of Central Turkestan—namely the Zeravshan, Amu Darya, Murghab, and Tedzhen (Heri-rud)—and extending into the western Tarim Basin. In males, the white collar is absent, vestigial (represented by a few white spots or crescent-shaped markings on the sides of the neck), or narrow and incomplete, measuring no more than about 5 mm in width and broadly interrupted anteriorly (P. c. zerafschanicus). Ear tufts are well developed, except in P. c. zerafschanicus, where they are small. A characteristic feature of the group is the pattern of the upper wing coverts, which are white in their apical half and light brown in their basal half (the latter usually concealed beneath the white feather tips), with sparse longitudinal rufous-red or brownish-red streaks. The general plumage hue varies from golden-rufous to dark bronze-red and golden-brown. The back is golden-red to copper-red, with black feather edges showing a metallic blue or green sheen. The rump and upper tail-coverts are similar in colour to the back, but bear sparse black spots that gradually disappear towards the tail; these spots are poorly developed or absent in P. c. zerafschanicus. The scapulars appear relatively uniform in colour, with the creamy-white feather patterns largely concealed. The sides of the body are golden-red or golden-brown with broad glossy dark metallic feather margins. Two subgroups can be distinguished: (a) P. c. principalis, P. c. zarudnyi, and P. c. zerafschanicus have most feathers of the centre of the crop and breast copper-red with a golden tint and with purple-red or shellac-red margins whereas the lateral breast feathers retain metallic violet- or green-black margins; the belly is rufous-brown; also called "red-bellied subgroup"; (b) P. c. chrysomelas, P. c. bianchii, and P. c. shawii have crop and breast feathers all margined with glossy green- or violet-black; the belly is matte blackish-brown; also called "black-and-golden subgroup". The geographic ranges of these subspecies form a roughly cross-shaped pattern, with P. c. zarudnyi occupying the centre. Females of this group are paler than those of the Black-necked subspecies group. The upperparts are sandy-grey with a slight reddish sheen and dark, elongated spots. The underparts are pale ochre, lacking a distinct streaked pattern, with only sparse small spots on the crop and flanks. Male wing length averages smallest in P. c. zerafschanicus (~230 mm), and largest in P. c. bianchii (~250 mm), with P. c. principalis, P. c. chrysomelas, and P. c. shawii averaging intermediate values (~241–243 mm), while P. c. zarudnyi is intermediate in wing length between the neighbouring subspecies.

==== 1.2.1. Phasianus colchicus principalis (Prince of Wales's white-winged pheasant) ====
Authority and original description: Sclater, P.L. 1885.

Type locality: Bala Murghab, Afghanistan.

Protonym and synonyms:

- Phasianus principalis Sclater, 1885 — protonym
- Phasianus komarowi Bogdanow, 1886 — junior synonym
- Phasianus principalis komarowi Buturlin, 1904 — junior synonym
- Phasianus principalis typicus Buturlin, 1904 — junior synonym
- Phasianus non-ultimus Zarudny, 1909 — junior synonym

Local names: قرقاول خراسانی (Persian: Khorasani Pheasant), قرقاول سرخسی (Persian: Fern Pheasant), قرقاول بال نقره ای (Persian: Silver-winged Pheasant), د ویلز شهزاده فیزانت (Persian: Prince of Wale's Pheasant), Murgap sülgüni (Turkmen: Murghab Pheasant), Мургабский фазан (Russian: Murghab Pheasant)

Description: The male resembles that of P. c. persicus but differs in having white upper wing-coverts, a brighter golden mantle, and a generally redder plumage that lacks its shining coppery-purple or purple-lake gloss. As in the colchicus-group, a visible white neck collar is typically absent, although concealed traces or white spots may occasionally be present on the hidden parts of the neck plumage. The anterior back and mantle are predominantly golden-rufous or pale golden-yellow, with a developed scaly pattern formed by wide feather edges measuring up to 1.5 mm, which in the interscapular region usually merge with the dark apical spots. The scapulars are broadly edged with golden-rufous, where the central matte-black and cream-white pattern of most feathers is largely concealed under adjacent feathers when smooth, resulting in a uniform appearance that lacks the typical variegation of the Black-necked subspecies group. These scapular feathers terminate in broad apical spots and are bordered at their tips with a black margin measuring 1.5–3 mm. The feathers of the crop and center of the chest are bright golden-orange or copper-red, finished with broad purple-violet to purplish red-bronze edges measuring 2–2.5 mm and up to 3.5 mm in width, entirely lacking a black central stripe or apical shaft-streaks. On the sides of the chest and breast, the feathers carry metallic violet- or green-black terminal borders, or margins varying from blue-green to violet-blue. The flank feathers are pale golden-yellow or golden-red, broadly tipped with dark greenish to purplish-blue or blackish-blue. The lower back, rump, and upper tail-coverts are brownish red, yellowish-red, or golden-reddish-rufous, usually lacking the purple-blue gloss characteristic of P. c. persicus, and featuring dark green markings or sparse black spots that gradually disappear toward the tail. The belly is rufous, warm brown, or light chestnut-red. Plumage colouration in this subspecies is almost identical to that of marginal populations of P. c. zarudnyi. Females are generally much paler than those of P. c. colchicus and of P. c. persicus; the ground color of the body is a light sandy tone or pale clay-buff, the ground color of the mantle is paler rufous, and they closely resemble females of P. c. chrysomelas.

Photographs: Photographs are available from Tandoureh National Park in Iran.

Measurements: Male wing length: Ogilvie-Grant: 239 mm; Hartert, Delacour: n = 17: 234–248 mm; Dementyev: n = 9: 238–250 mm (mean 244 mm); Vaurie: n = 10: 235–253 mm (mean 242.5 mm); Kayvanfar et al.: n = 35: 245.9 ± 23 mm.

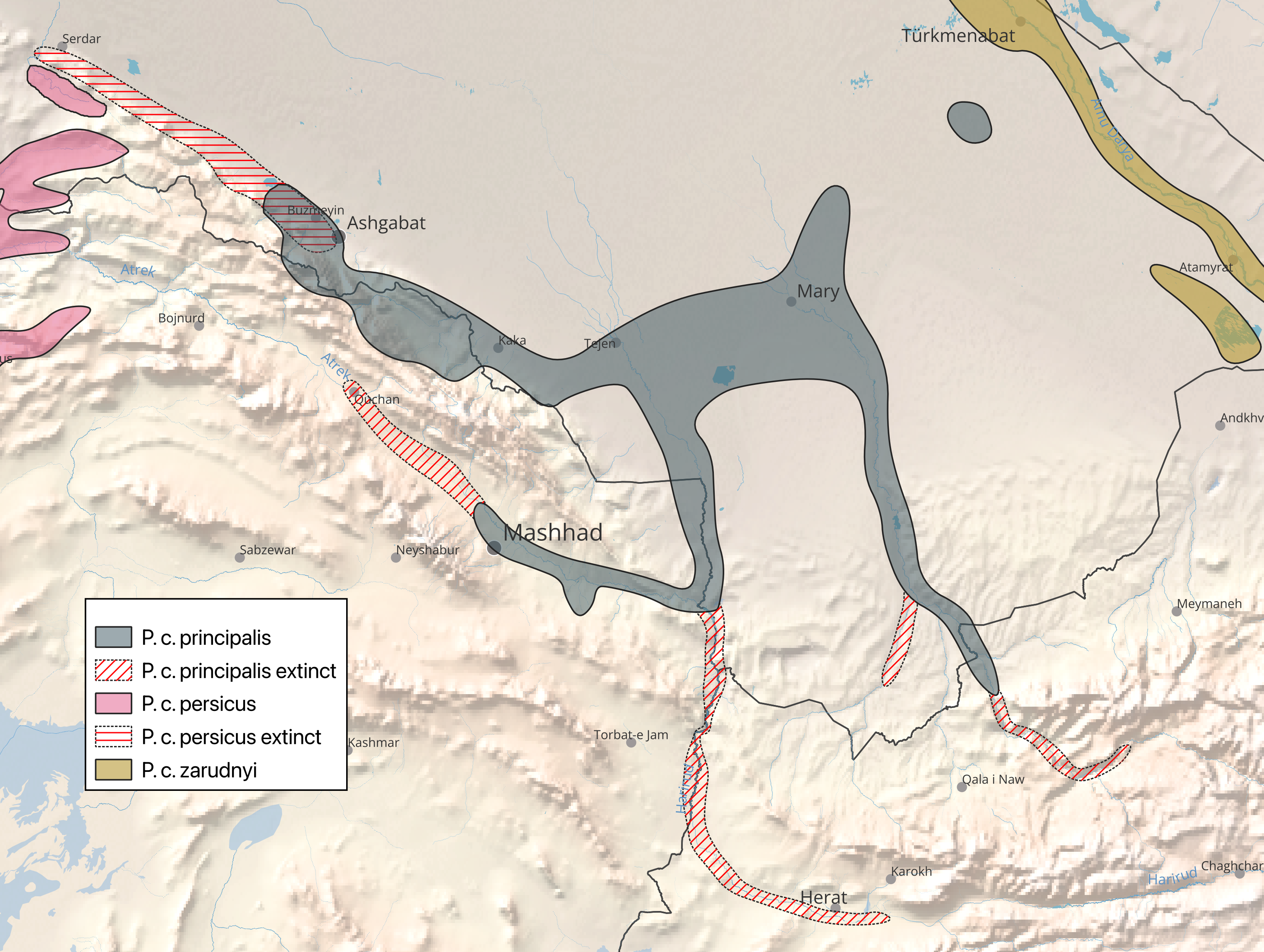
Historical and present distribution range of P. c. principalis.

Distribution: Southeastern Turkmenistan (including Merv Oasis), extreme northeastern Iran (Khorasan, from Quchan County east to Sarakhs County) and northern Afghanistan (Murghab and Tedzhen/Hari Rud river valleys). It also occurs along streams descending from Dargaz and Kalat. To the north, its range extends to Ashgabat and Gökdepe. Until about 1920, P. c. persicus occupied the Ashgabat and Gökdepe region of Turkmenistan, while P. c. principalis extended northward only as far as Babadurmaz. Following the extirpation of P. c. persicus through hunting, P. c. principalis expanded northward into these areas. To the northeast, the range of P. c. principalis reaches Repetek. Around 1890, this subspecies was still common in the Kashafrud valley from Mashhad to Quchan, in Lotfabad, and along the Hari Rud as far as Herat and, less frequently, beyond. It also occurred in the upper Murghab valley, where it was numerous between Bala Murghab and the Afghan border. In 1945, it remained abundant in the Hari Rud valley (Kushan), the lower Kushk valley (Kushk district), and the Murghab valley (Murichaq). By 1959, the subspecies was probably extinct in Afghanistan as a result of overhunting and habitat destruction.

Habitat: Grassy and shrub-covered habitats associated with reed beds and situated near cultivated fields; river valleys densely overgrown with forest and tamarisk, together with adjacent plains covered by shrubs and camel thorn. This subspecies is primarily a bird of the plains. In the foothills of the Kopet Dagh, it occurs mainly in stands of Tamarix ramosissima, T. chinensis and Populus euphratica. In the Hari Rud valley, it formerly inhabited reed swamps along watercourses dominated by tamarisk, interspersed with groves of Populus and occasional apricot orchards.

==== 1.2.2. Phasianus colchicus zarudnyi (Amu-Darya white-winged pheasant) ====
Authority and original description: Buturlin, S.A. 1904.

Type locality: Amu Daria from Khiva to Chardjui.

Protonym and synonyms:

- Phasianus medius Buturlin, 1886 — protonym
- Phasianus principalis zarudnyi Buturlin, 1904 — nomen emend.
- Phasianus colchicus gordius Alferaki & Bianchi, 1907 — junior synonym
- Phasianus colchicus tschardjuensis Buturlin, 1908 — junior synonym

Local names: Amyderýa sülgüni (Turkmen: Amu Darya Pheasant), Амударё қирғовули (Uzbek: Amu Darya Pheasant), Аму-Дарьинский фазан (Russian: Amu Darya Pheasant)

Description: The male is highly variable and generally resembles that of P. c. principalis, although birds from the central part of the range approach P. c. zerafschanicus. It is usually paler and brighter than the male of P. c. principalis, although some individuals may be indistinguishable from that subspecies or even darker. The white collar is highly variable, usually appearing as two crescent-shaped lateral bands, sometimes reduced to a few concealed white feathers, and only rarely absent altogether. The black feather margins on the back are sometimes completely absent and sometimes strongly developed, but they do not merge with the dark terminal spot; in most individuals, such dark margins are absent on the shoulder feathers. The crimson colouration of the neck occurs both in birds with well-developed scaly patterning and in birds in which this pattern is barely discernible; in many specimens, it is weakly developed and may occasionally even be absent. The crimson- to purple-red margins of the crop and breast feathers are usually darker than in P. c. principalis. The flank feather tips are greenish, and the throat feathers have greenish rather than purple margins. The crimson-red margins of the anterior chest feathers contrast sharply with the remainder of the feather, which is pale straw-golden in summer and yellow- or reddish-golden in winter, and these margins are paler than in P. c. principalis. Some individuals have broad crimson margins at the feathers of the underparts but only narrow, almost imperceptible dark margins at the feathers of the back. The belly is rufous. Geographical variation is also pronounced. Birds from the central part of the range (the Amudarya Valley between Chardzhou and Deinau = Dänew) resemble P. c. zerafschanicus: the anterior chest feathers are predominantly yellow-red with a relatively narrow wine-red or purple margin, and a white collar is usually well developed, appearing as distinct or interrupted crescent-shaped markings on the sides of the neck. Birds from peripheral populations (particularly in the Dargan-Ata and Kerki regions) are darker and more closely resemble P. c. principalis: the anterior chest feathers have a brownish-red band with a rusty tint and a relatively broad purple or purple-violet margin, while the white collar is more often inconspicuous or absent, although it may occasionally be almost complete. Females of P. c. zarudnyi are slightly darker and more heavily marked than those of the neighbouring subspecies. Because of this extensive individual and geographical variation, Dementyev regarded P. c. zarudnyi as a hybrid form derived from the four adjacent subspecies P. c. principalis, P. c. zerafschanicus, P. c. chrysomelas, and P. c. bianchii. One hypothesis proposes that P. c. chrysomelas and P. c. bianchii, now separated geographically, formerly occupied a continuous range along the Amu Darya. According to this hypothesis, subsequent expansion of P. c. principalis into this region, combined with intermittent contact with P. c. zerafschanicus during periods when the Zerafshan River flooded towards the Amu-Darya, produced the highly variable phenotype characteristic of P. c. zarudnyi.

Photographs: Photographs are available from Amu Darya Nature Reserve in Turkmenistan.

Measurements: Male wing length: Dementyev: n = 8: 227–244 mm (mean 234 mm).

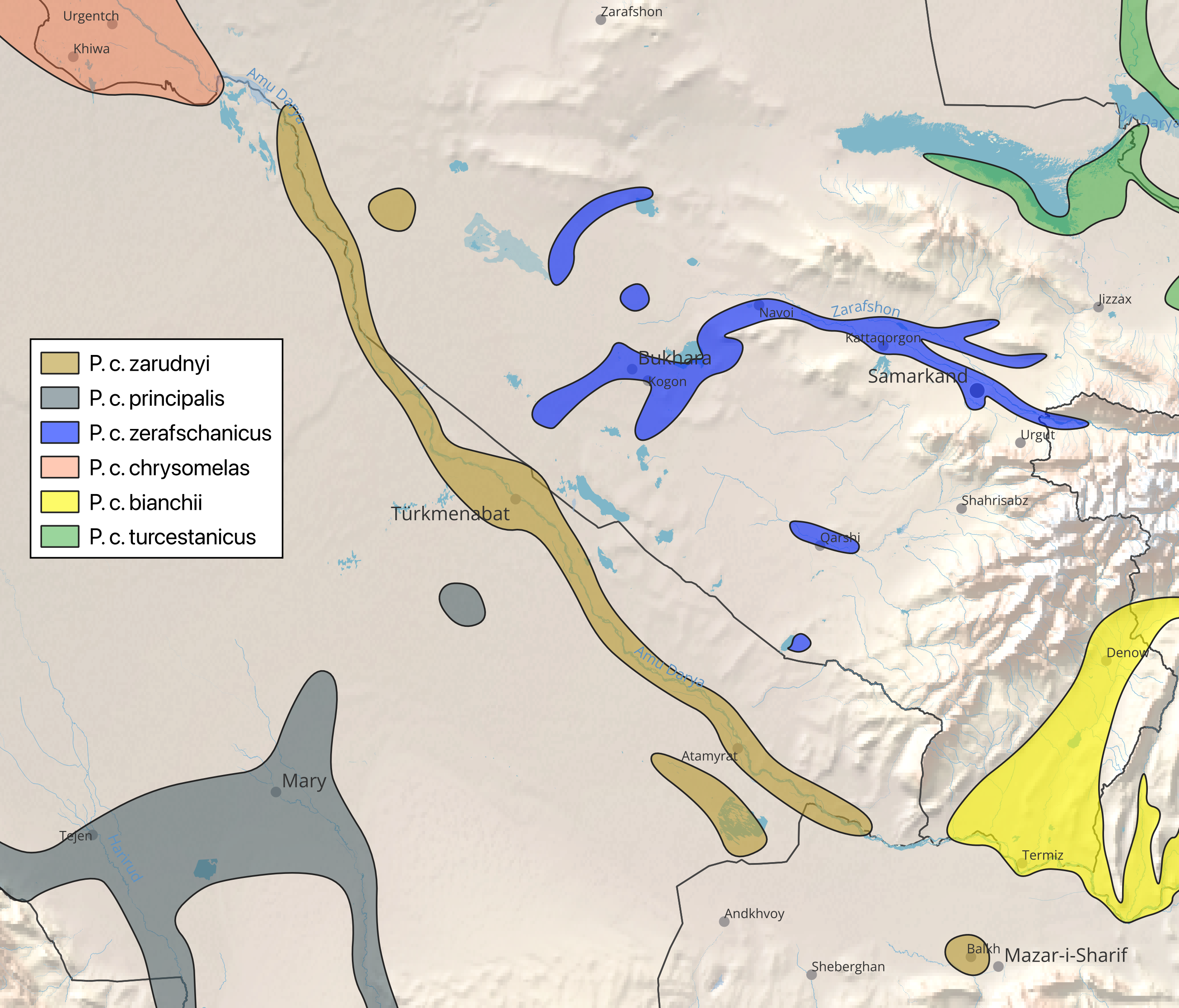
Distribution range of P. c. zarudnyi.

Distribution: Originally distributed in the central Amu-Darya valley along the eastern Turkmenistan–Uzbekistan border, extending north to Turtkul (where its range nearly met the southernmost populations of P. c. chrysomelas) and south to Kerki and Köýtendag (the easternmost locality of P. c. bianchii). At present, the northern limit of its range is the Tuyamuyun reservoir, which forms a natural barrier between P. c. zarudnyi and P. c. chrysomelas, while the southern limit lies near Kelif. It maintains secondary contact with P. c. zerafschanicus directly along the artificial path of the Amu-Bukhara Canal. In Uzbekistan, the subspecies is restricted to the Kyzylkum Tugai and Sand Reserve in the Bukhara region on the right bank of the Amu Darya, whose buffer zone includes the Darganata tugai forest on the left bank.

Habitat: In the Amu Darya floodplain, the pheasant inhabits tugai forests of varying age and density, developed floodplain habitats, and most islands are overgrown with herbaceous and woody vegetation. In the surrounding desert, its distribution is largely confined to wetlands. It occupies a wide range of mature riparian tugai habitats, from tall rugged poplar-oleaster forests with dense undergrowth to open shrub-herb thickets of chingil, liquorice, bulrush, and elephant grass. Pheasants are also common on vegetated islands, particularly those dominated by herbaceous cover. In spring, most birds concentrate in moist tugai habitats along riverbanks, whereas in autumn and winter they occur mainly on islands, in adjacent agricultural land, or occasionally at the margins of the desert.

==== 1.2.3. Phasianus colchicus zerafschanicus (Zerafshan white-winged pheasant) ====
Authority and original description: Tarnovski, G.V. 1891.

Type locality: Katla Kurgan, Samarkand (southern Uzbekistan).

Protonym and synonyms:

- Phasianus zerafschanicus sive klossowskii Tarnovski, G.V. 1891 — protonym
- Phasianus tarnovksii Seebohm, H. 1892 — junior synonym

Local names: Зарафшон қирғовули (Uzbek: Zerafshan Pheasant), Зарафшонӣ тазарв (Tajik: Zerafshan Pheasant), Зеравшанский фазан (Russian: Zerafshan Pheasant)

Description: The male resembles that of P. c. zarudnyi in its generally pale, bright, golden colouration. The dorsal plumage is almost as variable as in P. c. zarudnyi, although some individuals are even paler and brighter, becoming notably faded and pale-buff on the margins by spring due to seasonal wear. It differs from the other subspecies of its group by its well-developed white collar, which is usually narrow, broadly interrupted anteriorly, or reduced to crescent-shaped lateral bands. The black apical margins of the feathers of the anterior back are absent or poorly developed. The scapulars have black tips but lack black margins. The crop, breast, and upper underparts are paler than in the black-and-golden subspecies P. c. bianchii and P. c. chrysomelas. The throat is usually purple-red. The feathers on the crop and anterior chest have a broad yellow-red to golden-red basal zone with narrow, indented wine-red to purplish margins; in some individuals a narrow black shaft stripe or marginal border is also present. The belly is rufous. The female is similar to that of P. c. zarudnyi.

Photographs: Photographs are available from Zarafshan National Park in Uzbekistan.

Measurements: Male wing length: Salikhbaev & Bogdanov: 220–241 mm.

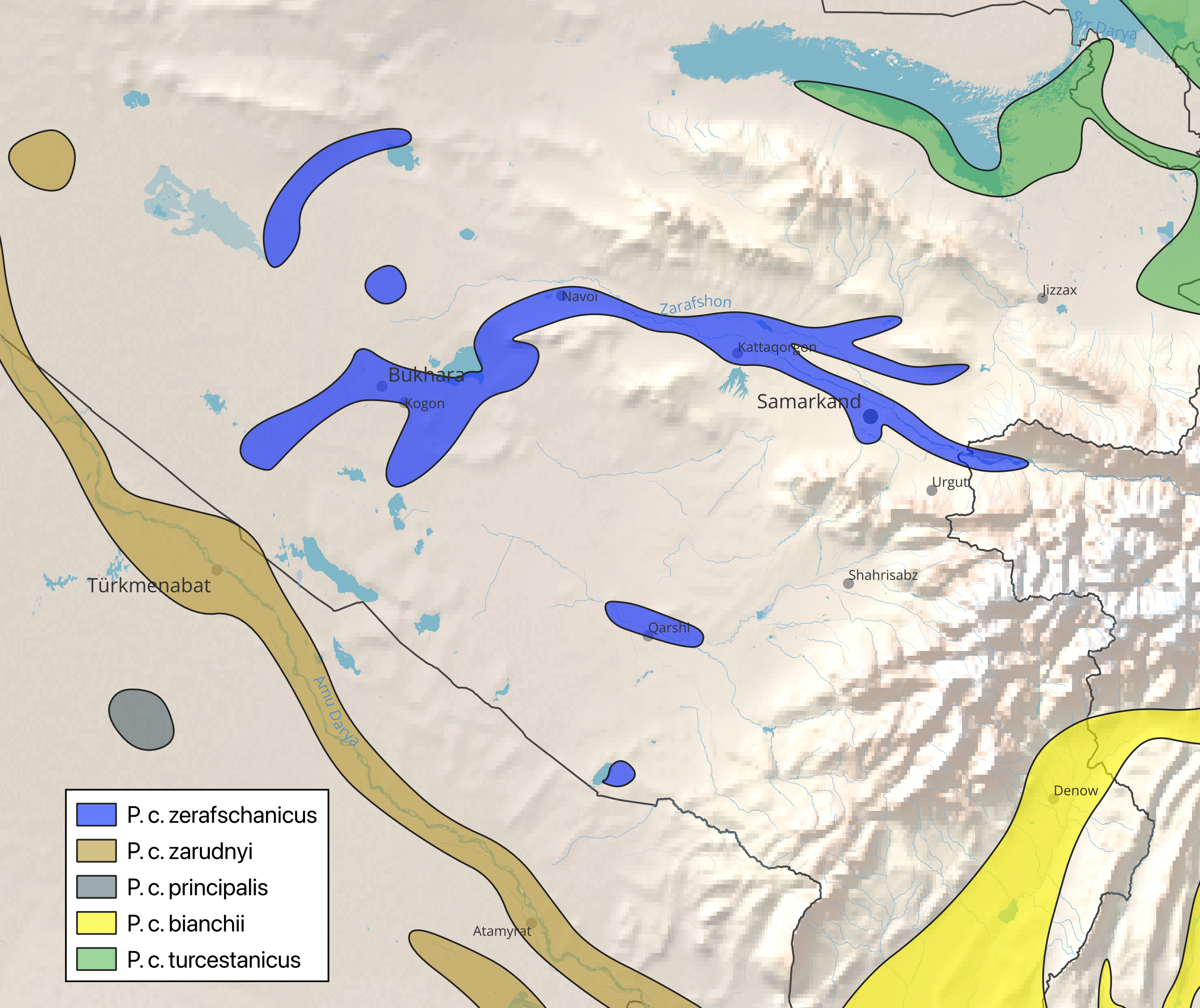
Distribution range of P. c. zerafschanicus.

Distribution: Originally occurred in southern Uzbekistan throughout the Zarafshan River valley from Farab via Bukhara to Samarkand and Penjikent, and further east to Dashty-Kozy. In the Kashkadarya region, it occurred along the Guzardarya and Kyzyldarya rivers and in the vicinity of Karshi, Shakhrisabz, Kitab, Chirakchi. The northern boundary separating it from P. c. turcestanicus is formed by the watershed between the Zerafshan and the Syr-Daria rivers; to the south, the Hissar Mountains separate it from P. c. bianchii; to the west, its range nearly met that of P. c. zarudnyi, as during periods of high water the Zerafshan may have flooded almost to the Amu Daria; today, it maintains secondary contact with P. c. zarudnyi directly along the artificial path of the Amu-Bukhara Canal. Currently, the distribution is highly fragmented. The largest population occurs in the Zarafshan Nature Reserve near Samarkand in the Jambay district. The pheasant has also been recorded in the Katta-Kurgan area along the irrigation canals bordered by reedbeds and around collecting reservoirs, as well as in the Kermine area in agricultural gardens. One of the southernmost strongholds is in the vicinity of Shafirkan, where the population remains relatively numerous. The subspecies is listed in the Red Book of Uzbekistan.

Habitat: It nests in thickets of reeds and cattails along the shores of lakes and rivers and in tugai forests; it also frequents gardens, groves, grain and alfalfa fields, as well as wastelands and fallow lands overgrown with weeds. Along the banks of Ak Darya and Kara Darya in the middle reaches of Zerafshan, it inhabits tugai dominated by oleaster and, to a lesser extent, willows and other trees with a dense understorey of liquorice and other tall grasses, as well as dense grass thickets interspersed with tamarisk shrubs along the boundary between the floodplain and the desert. It often occurs away from woody vegetation in wheat and cotton fields, particularly where extensive dense reedbeds are present nearby. In spring, pheasants occupy relatively open tugai forests of poplar, willow, oleaster, and sea-buckthorn. During the breeding season, they concentrate in dense tugai vegetation dominated by tall herbs, elephant grass, and tamarisk. In the Kashgar Darya valley and the lower Zerafshan, where riparian forests are largely absent, they inhabit reed and cattail thickets. In the Shafirkan region, pheasants frequently use agricultural land in spring, occurring in vineyards, along cotton-field margins, and beside herb-covered irrigation ditches. During winter, they are found exclusively in dense tugai forests within the Zarafshan floodplain. Near Khodzha-Davlyat station and in the Shafirkan area, they also occur in thickets of saxaul, saltwort, and liquorice. Around Shakhrisabz, Kitab, and Guzar, pheasants inhabit cultivated oases characterised by a dense network of tree plantings, village gardens, and agricultural fields, especially alfalfa and cereal crops. In these habitats, the presence of permanent water bodies such as rivers, lakes, canals, or springs is essential. Along the Tanhas River in the Shakhrisabz district, the subspecies ascends mountain gorges along the channels to about 1,500 m above sea level and may occur in remote village gardens.

==== 1.2.4. Phasianus colchicus chrysomelas (Khivan white-winged pheasant) ====
Authority and original description: Severtsov, N.A. 1874.

Type locality: Lower Amu Daria, Russian Turkestan (present-day Uzbekistan/Turkmenistan).

Protonym and synonyms:

- Phasianus chrysomelas Severtsov, 1874 — protonym

Local names: Hywa sülgün (Turkmen: Khiva Pheasant), Хива қирғовули (Uzbek: Khiva Pheasant), Хивинский фазан (Russian: Khiva Pheasant)

Description: This subspecies is very similar to P. c. bianchii. The male has white upper wing-coverts, as in the other subspecies of this group. The white collar is usually narrow and always widely open anteriorly (and not infrequently also posteriorly), though it is occasionally completely absent. The upperparts are dark bronze-red rather than yellowish-orange, with coppery and golden reflections. The dorsal plumage shows a distinct scaly pattern formed by broad metallic green feather margins, although the green colouration of the lower back is very poorly developed and often virtually absent. The underparts are generally similar to those of P. c. bianchii, but the crop and chest are lighter, with the coppery-red to golden ground colour predominating over the glossy metallic green-black feather margins, which are narrower than in P. c. bianchii. Like P. c. bianchii and P. c. shawii, this subspecies belongs to the black-and-golden subgroup, in which the crop and breast feathers are broadly margined with glossy metallic green-black, unlike the red-bellied P. c. principalis, P. c. zarudnyi, and P. c. zerafschanicus. The female resembles that of P. c. bianchii, but has smaller and more distinct blackish markings and is slightly darker than the female of P. c. principalis.

Photographs: Photographs are available from the Badai-Tugai Nature Reserve in Uzbekistan, from the Lower Amu Darya Biosphere Reserve, and from other regions in the Republic of Karakalpakstan.

Measurements: Male wing length: Ogilvie-Grant: 236 mm; Hartert: 236–247 mm; Dementyev: n = 2: 235–250 (mean 242.5 mm); Salikhbaev & Bogdanov: n = 13: 235–250 mm.

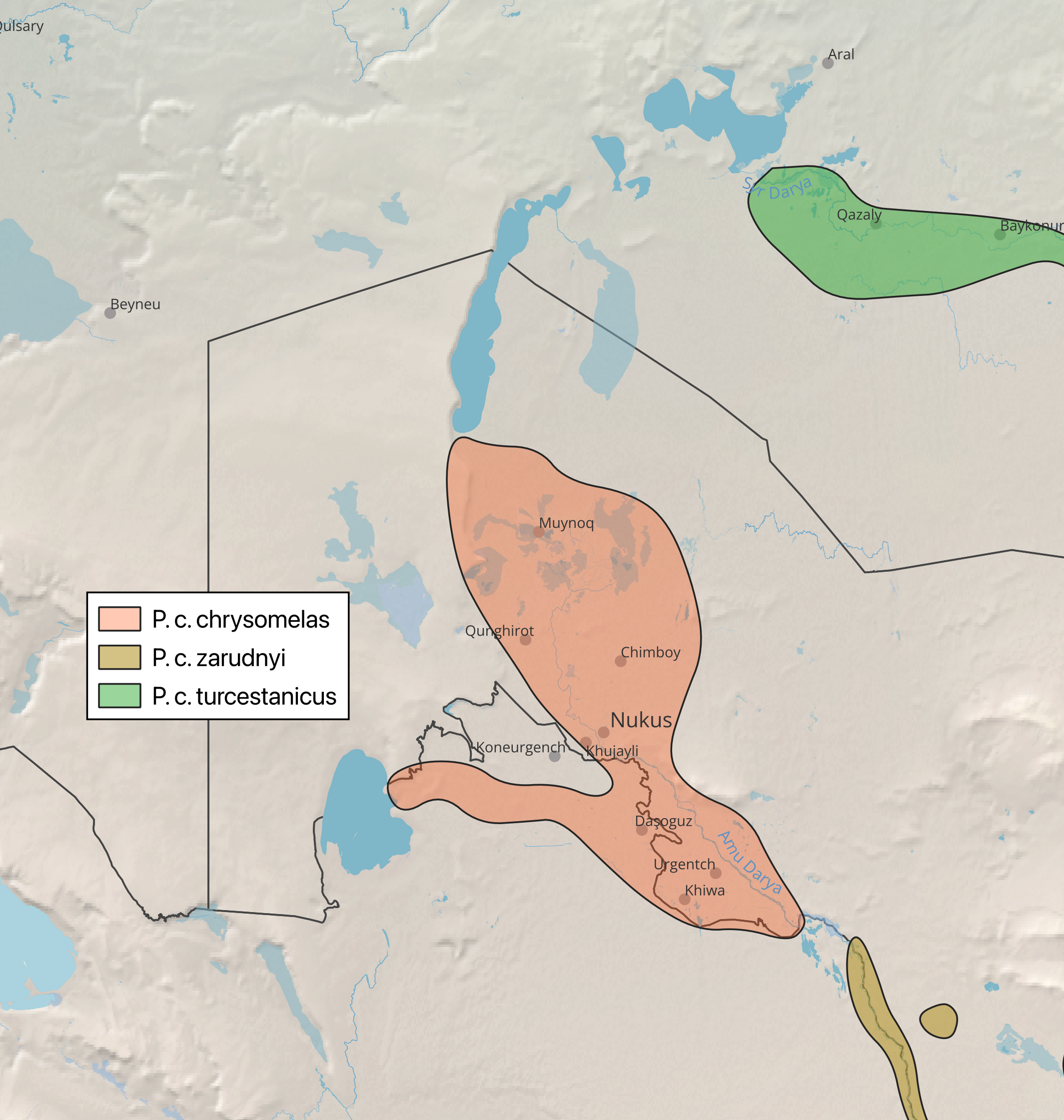
Distribution range of P. c. chrysomelas, which is south of the former Lake Aral.

Distribution: Lower reaches and delta of the Amu Darya, including Khiva oasis, in western Uzbekistan and northern Turkmenistan. The subspecies does not extend to the Syr Darya. Historically, its range extended from Turtkul across the Khiva oasis and the Amu Darya delta to the southeastern shore of the Aral Sea, where it occurred both on islands and along the coastline. It was recorded from Kungrad and Nukus, throughout much of the Khorezm region (including the Kosh-Kupyr, Yangi-Aryk, and Khiva districts), in the Tashauz region, in the Khodzheli and Shumanai districts, and in the Baday-tugai Nature Reserve. In the northwest, the distribution boundary nearly reached the southern escarpment of the Ustyurt Plateau (Sudochye Lake). At present, its habitat has been severely degraded by the burning and uprooting of about 90% of the original tugai forest and by the desertification of the Aral Sea. The current distribution is poorly known. The Lower Amu Darya State Biosphere Reserve was established in Uzbekistan in 2011, which extends the Badai-Tugai Nature Reserve northward to the Nazarkhan Tugai and southward to Beruniy, and which today hosts some of the remaining populations of this subspecies. Recent observations suggest that the subspecies has followed the shifting course of the Amu Darya westward into the Sarygamysh Depression and possibly beyond.

Habitat: The Khiva pheasant primarily inhabits Asiatic poplar tugai forests of the lower Amu Darya, usually with varying admixture of oleaster and willow, as well as shrub thickets of tamarisk, salt-tree, dogbane, liquorice, and karelinia. It also occupies reed beds along the lake shores, floodplains, and coastal areas, and is frequently found in cultivated fields where suitable nesting and cover habitat are available. During spring, summer, and autumn, it prefers mixed shrub and subshrub tugai, as well as oleaster-salt-tree tugai, where food resources are abundant. In winter, it occurs mainly in poplar-oleaster and oleaster-salt-tree tugai. Nests are typically placed in tamarisk thickets, dense young stands of oleaster and poplar, and in thickets of karelinia and camel thorn.

==== 1.2.5. Phasianus colchicus bianchii (Bianchi's white-winged pheasant) ====
Authority and original description: Buturlin, S.A. 1904.

Type locality: Upper Amu Darya Valley (southern Uzbekistan).

Protonym and synonyms:

- Phasianus chrysomelas bianchii Buturlin, 1904 — protonym
- Phasianus jabae Zarudny, 1909 — junior synonym
- Phasianus colchicus michailowski Zarudny, 1909 — junior synonym

Local names: Тожикистон қирғовули (Uzbek: Tajik Pheasant), Тоҷикистонӣ тазарв (Tajik: Tajik Pheasant), Таджикский фазан (Russian: Tajik Pheasant)

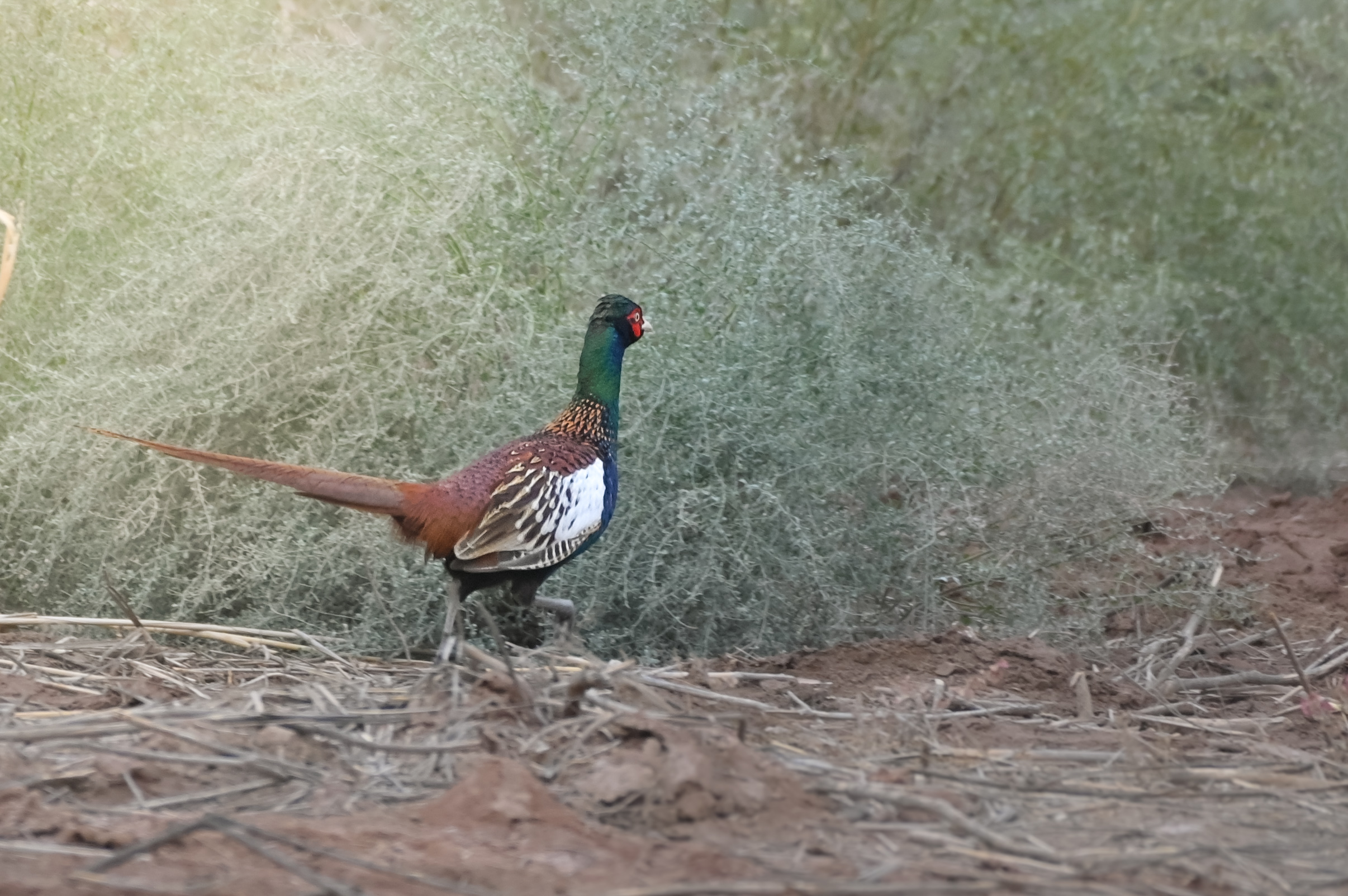
Phasianus colchicus bianchii

Description: The males have white upper wing-coverts, as in the other subspecies of this group, and lack an externally visible white collar, although a few concealed white feathers may occasionally be present. The upperparts are duller and browner, less reddish, than in P. c. principalis, but darker than in P. c. zarudnyi. The dorsal plumage shows a well-developed scaly pattern formed by dark metallic green feather margins merging with the terminal markings. The underparts are darker than in both P. c. principalis and P. c. zarudnyi, with blackish markings merging on the breast. The general colouration is similar to that of P. c. chrysomelas. The crop and anterior chest appear almost entirely glossy metallic bluish- to blackish-green because the very broad glossy green-black distal margins of the feathers merge to conceal virtually all of the coppery-red ground colour. These margins are broader than in P. c. chrysomelas, so that the green gloss predominates over the coppery-red ground colour, often appearing dark golden. The flank feathers have very broad glossy black-green terminal markings. Like P. c. chrysomelas and P. c. shawii, this subspecies belongs to the black-and-golden subgroup, in which the crop and breast feathers are broadly margined with glossy greenish-black, unlike the red-bellied P. c. principalis, P. c. zarudnyi, and P. c. zerafschanicus. The female is very pale, with relatively few dark markings, and resembles that of P. c. principalis.

Photographs: Photographs are available from Surkhandarya Region in Uzbekistan, and from Tigrovaya Balka Nature Reserve in Tajikistan.

Measurements: Male wing length: Dementyev: n = 20: 240–260 mm (mean 249.7 mm).

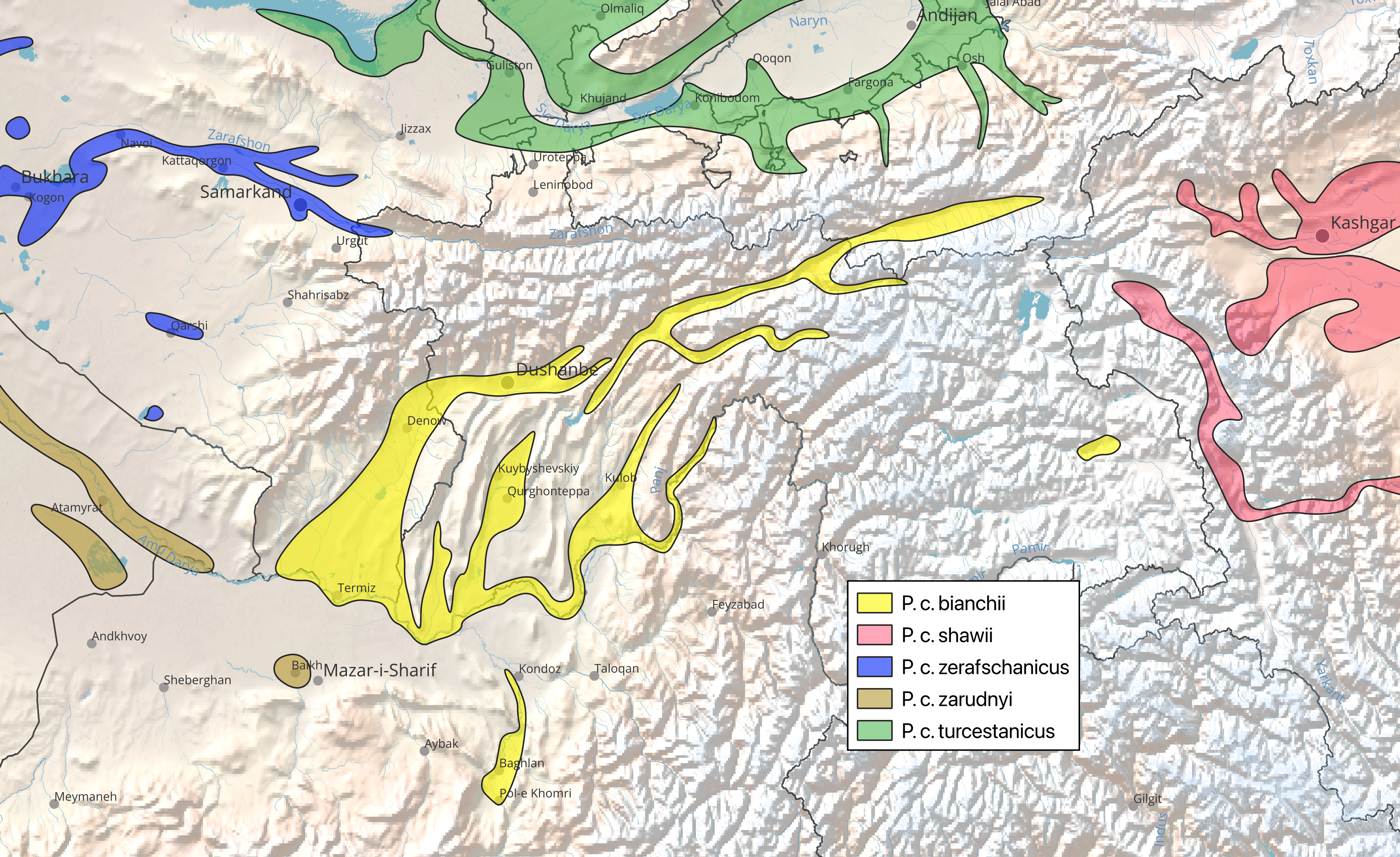
Distribution range of P. c. bianchii.

Distribution: Upper Amu Darya basin in southern Uzbekistan, southwestern Tajikistan, and extreme northern Afghanistan. To the north, east, and south, the range is bounded by the Hissar, Alai, Pamir, and Hindu Kush mountain ranges, respectively. Its downstream limit along the Amu Darya is uncertain, as is its exact relationship with P. c. zarudnyi. Historically, it occurred along the Panj River from Termez to Chubek, and along its right-bank tributaries (including the Surkhandarya River) northwards to Denau. From there, the range entered into the Hissar Valley, reaching Dushanbe and Yangi Bazaar; along the Kafirnigan north of the 38th parallel; along the Vakhsh to slightly north of Bokhtar, where the river emerges from the mountains; and in the valleys of lower Qizilsu and Yakhsu rivers. Downstream along the Amu Darya, it apparently did not occur beyond Termez. Today, the subspecies is restricted to (a) small populations in the Tigrovaya Balka Nature Reserve and on remnant riparian woodland islands from the lower Vakhsh River to Kyzylkala; (b) areas around Tursunzade, Shahrinav, Hissar, Rudaki, and Vakhsh districts, as well as tugai islands along the lower courses of the Shirkent, Karatag, Khanaka, Dushanbinka and Kafarnigan rivers; and (c) the right bank of the Panj river along the Tajikistan–Afghanistan border between Hamadoni and Farkhor districts, together with tugai islands in the lower Qizilsu valley. In Afghanistan, it formerly occurred at Chashma-i-Sher, Dahana, and Pul-i-Khumri, and near Kunduz and Balkh, but by 1959 it appeared to be extinct throughout the country. The subspecies is globally threatened by hunting and habitat destruction.

Habitat: Tugai habitats dominated by woody vegetation of varying density, ranging from impenetrable thickets to more open areas with grassy clearings. It occurs in pure poplar stands on elevated parts of river valleys, in tugai dominated by grasses, thickets of tamarisk, sea-buckthorn, reeds, and weeds, and in small riparian tugai patches that are inaccessible from either the riverbank or the river itself. In the Vakhsh Valley, it inhabits stands of narrow-leaved oleaster (Elaeagnus angustifolia) and poplar (Populus pruinosa). In the Hissar Valley, it occurs not only on tugai islands along rivers but also in cultivated fields, orchards, undisturbed cemeteries, and even in green spaces near human settlements and airports. In the Panj Valley, it is found on tugai islands dominated by narrow-leaved oleaster and also in the vicinity of alfalfa and cotton fields.

==== 1.2.6. Phasianus colchicus shawii (Yarkand white-winged pheasant) ====
Authority and original description: Elliot, D.G. 1870.

Type locality: Yarkand (Xinjiang, western China).

Protonym and synonyms:

- Phasianus shawii Elliot, 1870 — protonym
- Phasianus insignis Elliot, 1870 — junior synonym
- Phasianus shawi chrysomeloides Lorenz, 1909 — junior synonym

Local names: 雉鸡莎车亚种 (Chinese: Shache subspecies of Common Pheasant)

Description: The males have a bronze-green to brownish-green crown and occiput, changing to purple or green in different lights; the face and throat are dark green, while the neck varies from greenish-blue to blue with purple iridescence. There are no whitish supraorbital lines, and the white collar is absent or represented only by a vestigial, incomplete narrow ring on the nape. the greater coverts broadly edged with chestnut. The lesser and median wing-coverts are white or whitish-buff. The upper back is metallic golden to golden-bronze; its feathers have narrow blackish-green margins and broad glossy green wedge-shaped terminal markings. The lower back, rump, and upper tail-coverts are orange-bronze to chestnut, with greenish and purplish reflections; the feathers of the lower back and rump bear a subterminal green spot on either side of the shaft. The breast feathers are slightly indented, while the crop feathers are more strongly scalloped, with a deeper median indentation and a more pointed structure. The crop is dark glossy green; the upper breast is metallic golden to golden-chestnut, the feathers edged with dark green or blackish-green; the middle breast is coppery red, and the lower breast and sides of the belly are dark glossy green. The flanks are golden-orange, and the elongated flank feathers have slightly indented or trilobed tips with broad iridescent terminal markings that appear violet, blue, or purplish-green according to the angle of light. The abdomen is brownish-black, surrounded by a glossy green band. The central tail-feathers are yellowish-ochre to rufous-brown, heavily barred with black, the dark bars on the basal half usually 3–4 mm wide. There is clinal variation in the dark margins of the flank and lateral breast feathers: these are narrow in the eastern part of the range, in the Aksu and Khotan Darya valleys, but broad in the west, in the Kashgar Darya valley ("insignis"). P. c. shawii resembles P. c. bianchii in the upperparts and flanks, but tends to have richer golden-orange flanks. It also resembles P. c. chrysomelas, but the upper back feathers have much narrower blackish-green margins and broad glossy green wedge-shaped terminal spots. It differs from P. c. tarimensis in having whitish wing-coverts and reddish to orange-bronze rump and upper tail-coverts. The female is very pale; the ground colour of the mantle is pale rufous-buff, and the remainder of the plumage is light buff. It has fewer dark markings than the female of P. c. bianchii.

Photographs: Photographs are available from Kashgar City, from Hotan Darya, from Duolang Reservoir near Aksu Darya, and from Aksu City.

Measurements: Male wing length: Elliot: 229 mm; Ogilvie-Grant: 244 mm; Vaurie: n = 10: 233–250 mm (mean 241 mm).

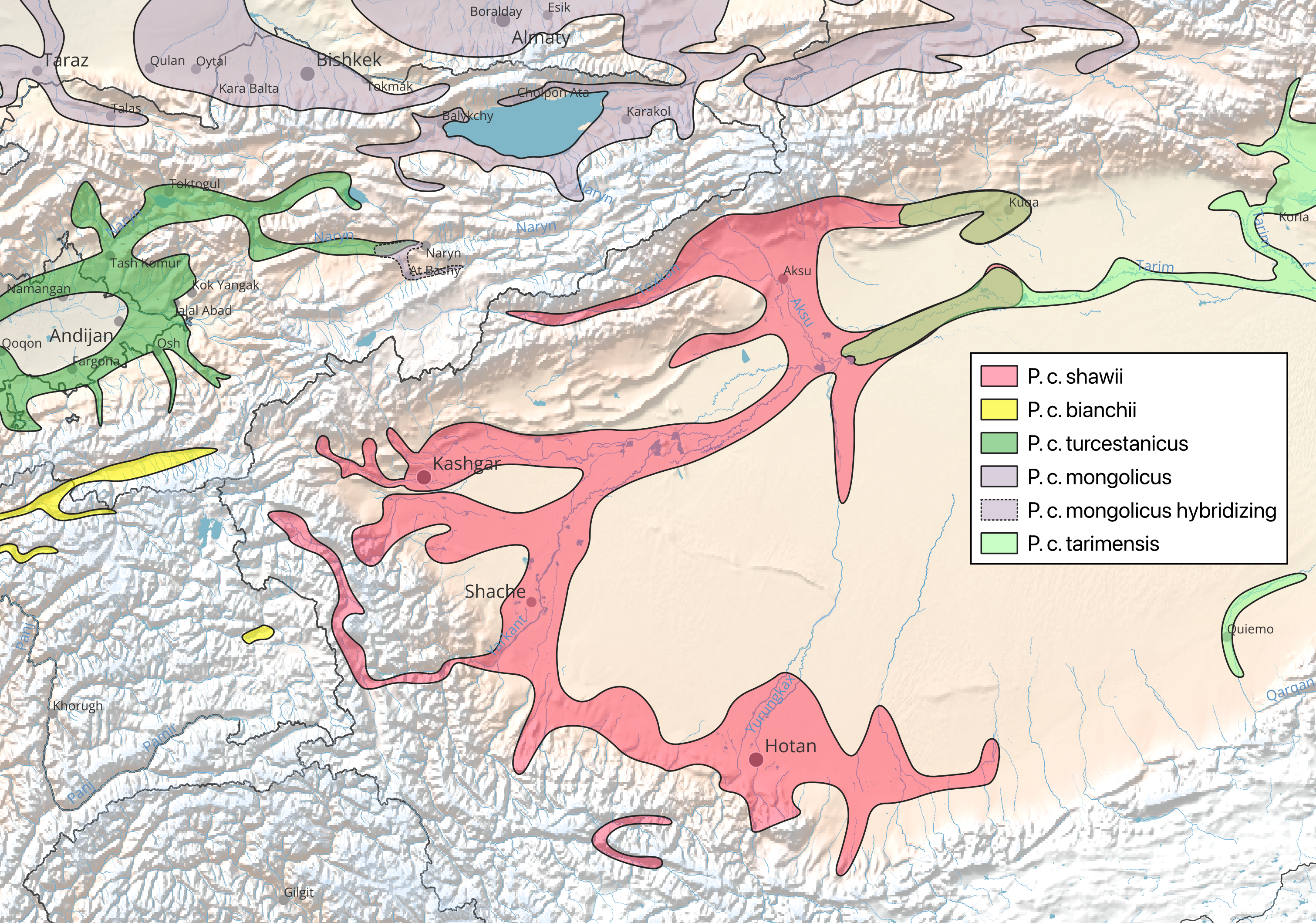
Distribution range of P. c. shawii.

Distribution: Western Tarim Basin in western China, including the valleys of the Hotan Daria, Yarkand Daria and the Kashgar Daria, the upper reaches of the Tarim River and the lower parts of the Aksu Valley. It occurs in Hotan Prefecture (Minfeng, Lop, Hotan, Moyu, Pishan, Yecheng), Kashgar Prefecture (Kashgar, Shache, Maigaiti, Yarkand River basin, Jiashi, Bachu), in Tumshuk City, in Kizilsu Prefecture (Akqi), and Aksu Prefecture (Aksu, Awat, Aral, Tarim River Basin, Wensu, Shaya, Xinhe, and Kuqa). To the southwest it extends to the road between Sanju (Pishan County) and Kashgar; to the north it reaches areas north of the Tarim River as far as Qiuci (= Kuqa) and the foothills of the Tien Shan in Wensu County. In the west, it enters the valleys at the foot of the Alay and Pamir mountains. It integrades with the sandy-winged P. c. tarimensis along the Tarim River between the Aksu-Hotan-Tarim confluence in the west and Xayar County. It is separated from P. c. mongolicus by the Tian Shan and from P. c. bianchii by the Pamir and Alay mountains.

Habitat: Dry reed beds and riparian habitats with tall grasses; it keeps mainly to the lowlands and lower mountain slopes, only rarely ascending to higher elevations. Pevtsov described in 1889 the primeval forest between the main branch of the Yarkand Darya and one of its side channels, where P. c. shawii was abundant. The entire area was covered with sparse desert poplar forest, composed chiefly of Populus euphratica and Populus pruinosa with occasional oleaster (Elaeagnus) trees. Shrubs were scarce, and the ground was covered with fallen leaves and branches mixed with loess dust.

Note: Genetic studies clearly show that this subspecies belongs to the principalis-chrysomelas group.

=== 1.3. Mongolicus group (Kyrgyz pheasants) ===
This group comprises subspecies distributed primarily across northeastern Turkestan and adjacent Xinjiang. Despite its name, P. c. mongolicus does not occur in Mongolia. In the males, a characteristic broad white neck-ring (7–10 mm wide) is always present, usually widely interrupted in front but sometimes complete and only narrowed anteriorly. Ear tufts are inconspicuous and often absent. The upper wing-coverts are white, occasionally carrying a slight greyish bloom, and feature sparse copper-red longitudinal streaks. The lower back, rump, and upper tail-coverts are copper-red with a strongly developed green or oily-greenish sheen. The general plumage hue is coppery, turning to dark reddish or orange-golden on crop, chest, and flanks, and with a pronounced greenish or purplish gloss on the crop, chest, shoulders, and interscapular region. The feathers of the middle of the crop and chest are usually more or less uniformly golden-copper red in their exposed portions, lacking black margins or showing only very narrow ones; when present, these margins do not exceed 1 mm in width. The throat coloration does not differ from that of the crop, creating a noticeable contrast against the sides of the neck and the back of the head. The black apical shaft wedges of the upper-back feathers are very narrow. The shoulder region is rather uniformly coloured, with the creamy-white feather patterns mostly concealed. Females of this group are pale and resemble those of the Amu Darya pheasants, but differ in having rounded dark spots on the foreback. The subspecies of this group represent the largest forms of P. colchicus (exceeded only by P. c. hagenbecki), with male wing lengths averaging about 255 mm and occasionally exceeding 270 mm; birds from the Syr Darya basin average about 8–12 mm shorter in wing length than those occurring farther east.

==== 1.3.1. Phasianus colchicus turcestanicus (Syr Darya pheasant) ====
Authority and original description: Lorenz, T. K. 1896.

Type locality: Syr Daria River, Turkestan.

Protonym and synonyms:

- Phasianus mongolicus turcestanicus — protonym
- Phasianus mongolicus triznae Zarudny, N. A. 1909 — junior synonym
- Phasianus mongolicus kvaskovskii Zarudny, N. A. 1909 — junior synonym
- Phasianus mongolicus bergii Zarudny, N. A. 1914 — junior synonym

Local names: Сирдарё қирғовули (Uzbek: Syr Darya Pheasant), Сирдарёӣ тазарв (Tajik: Syr Darya Pheasant), Сырдария қырғауылы (Kazakh: Syr Darya Pheasant), Сырдарья кыргоолу (Kyrgyz: Syr Darya Pheasant), Сыр-Дарьинский фазан (Russian: Syr Darya Pheasant).

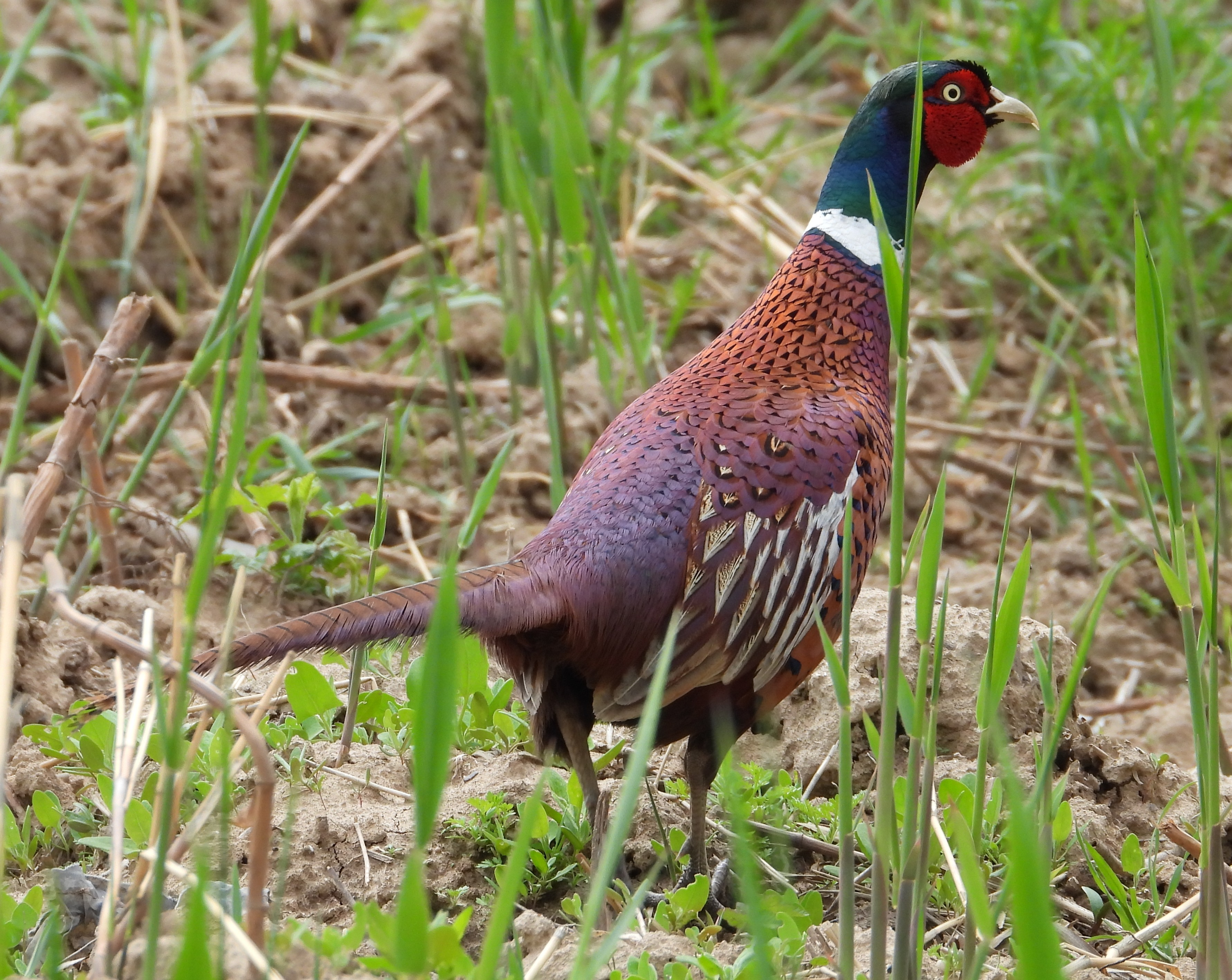
Phasianus colchicus turcestanicus at Tashkent Botanical Garden (altitude ~430 m)

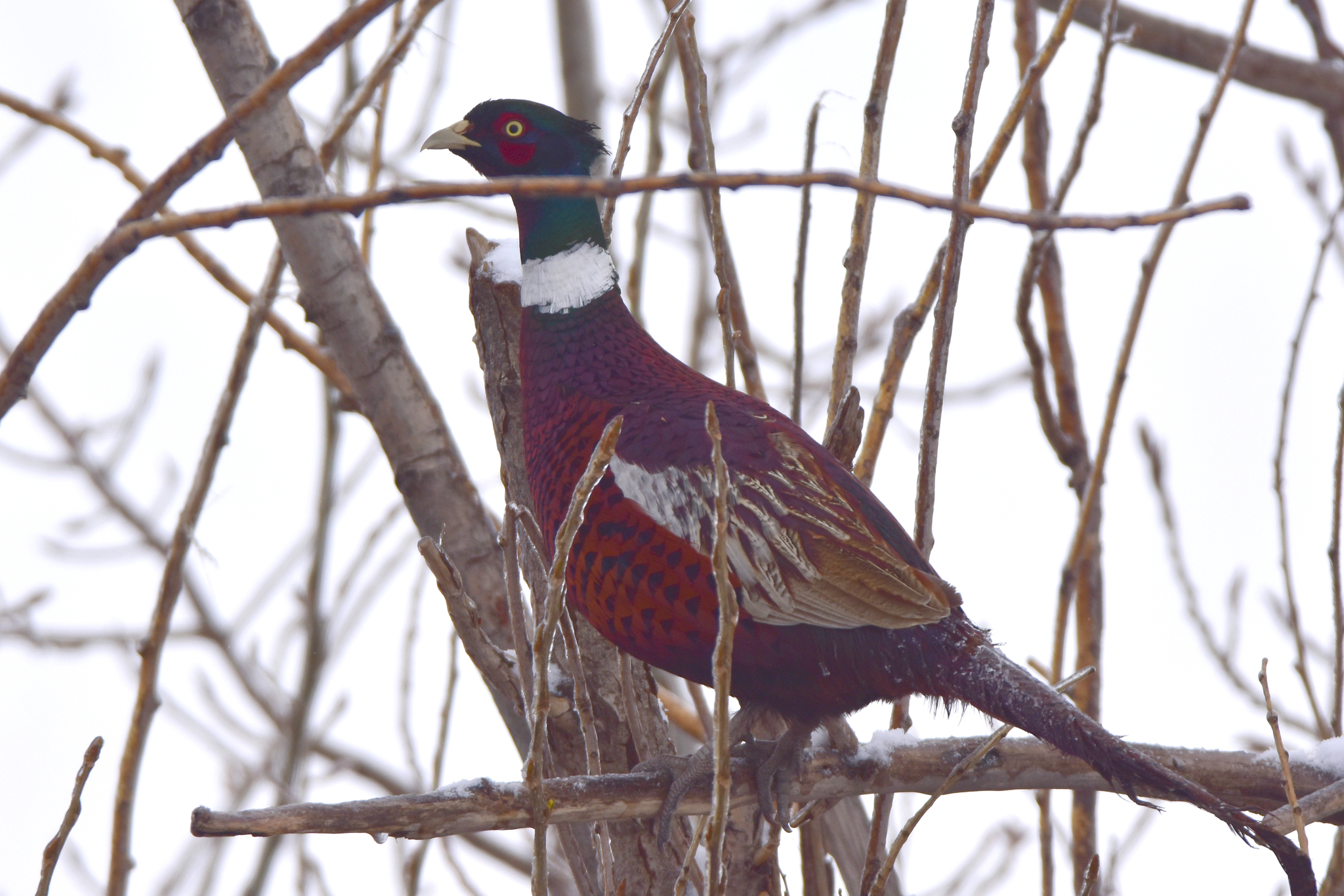
Phasianus colchicus turcestanicus in Abay District, Shymkent, Kazakhstan (altitude ~510 m).

Description: This subspecies is very similar to P. c. mongolicus, but the crown is less bronze-green, and the plumage overall shows less green and more blue and violet gloss on the crop, chest, shoulders, and interscapular region. The crown is green with a weak purple sheen. The white collar is wide (up to 1 cm) and usually broader than in P. c. mongolicus, narrowing anteriorly and being only slightly interrupted in front, or occasionally complete. The back, especially the upper back, is intensely coppery-red with a weak green sheen, while the rump and upper tail-coverts are more intensely red than in P. c. mongolicus. Typically, the feathers of the lower back and upper tail-coverts lack any distinct light-coloured margins at their apices. The forechest is less prominently brownish-red and more purple-violet, with the upper breast feathers carrying a purplish tint and usually lacking black terminal margins or having weakly developed ones. Typical populations feature blackish-brown black-bordered bellies and flank spots with a blue-violet, purplish-blue, or cherry-red gloss. Populations from the steep mountain thickets of the eastern Fergana Valley ("triznae") deviate by having darker underparts; the solid black of the belly extends far forward onto the anterior chest due to expanded black feather bases, the flank spots carry a pure green sheen completely lacking blue-violet tones, and the feathers of both the rump and upper tail-coverts display a unique, strongly developed development of bluish-grey and greenish-grey tips. The localized variant "bergii" (described by Zarudny in 1914 and formerly occurring on the now-vanished Aral Sea islands of Uzung-Kair and Uyaly) was distinguished by well-developed, broad black margins on the crop and chest feathers that showed a dark green or blue gloss, and by more deeply notched, indented forebreast feathers. It thus appeared intermediate between P. c. chrysomelas and typical P. c. turcestanicus. The female is large and pale, showing a pinkish-lilac hindneck suffusion, but is otherwise almost indistinguishable from that of P. c. mongolicus.

Photographs: Photographs are available from the Turkistan Region of Kazakhstan, and from northern Uzbekistan.

Measurements: Male wing length: Dementyev: n = 24: 240–263 mm (mean 253 mm); Tyurekhodzhaev (from birds around Zholek near Baygekum): 220–260 mm (mean 244 mm); Turmanov (from birds on the right bank of the Syr Darya west of Shieli): n = 12: 236–248 mm (mean 241 mm).

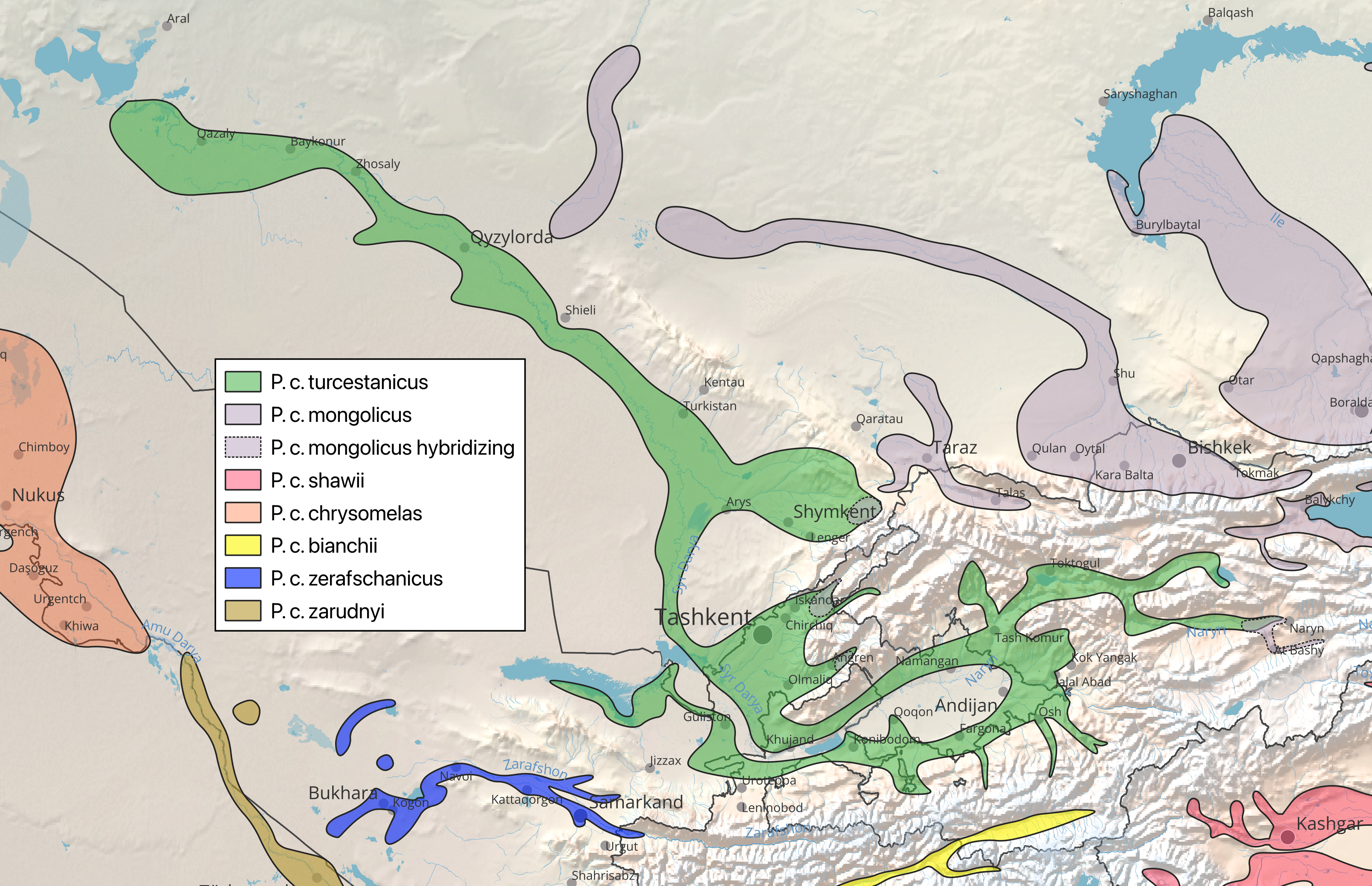
Distribution range of P. c. turcestanicus.

Distribution: Along valley of the Syr-Darya, from Kazakhstan southeast to the westernmost margins of the Fergana Basin (where it has been almost extirpated from the valley floor); in the eastern mountain slopes of the Ferghana Basin (form "triznae"), where it inhabits the mountain slopes of the Tien Shan to the south of Terskey-Ala-Tau in Uzbekistan and adjacent Kyrgyzstan (Abdusamat Nature Reserve). In the Jalalabad Region, it is distributed sporadically throughout its entire extent, particularly on the southeastern slopes of the Chatkal Range, in Arslanbob, and also in the Kara Darya basin. It formerly occurred near Gülchö in the Osh region; birds reported from the upper Kyzyl-Su River in the Alai Valley most likely belonged to P. c. bianchii (it is unclear whether they still occur there). Along the Syr Darya, a belt inhabited by pheasants extends along both banks of the river without penetrating far into the adjacent deserts. Its distribution also includes the middle and lower reaches of the principal tributaries of the Syr Darya, the Chirchik and Angren rivers. It formerly nested in the Arys River valley and has been observed in the foothills of the Talas-Alatau (Zhabagly), in the lower Iyyrsu River valley (a headwater of Mashat River) in the Mashattau Mountains, and near the Chokpak pass. At the beginning of the 21st century, pheasants spread to the Aksu-Dzhabagly area both from the Talas Valley across the Chokpak saddle (P. c. mongolicus) and from the Arys Valley (P. c. turcestanicus); in the Syr Darya Karatau they appeared in 2004 at the Boralday and Koshkar-ata rivers, in 2005 in the Aulie tract, in 2007 in Karabastau, and in 2010 near Kentau; breeding in Kokbulak was first recorded in 2007; the subspecific identity of birds throughout this area remains uncertain. In the Inner Tien Shan, it nests in Sary-Chelek and in the Naryn and Atbashi valleys. P. c. mongolicus was artificially introduced into the mid-montane regions of the Chirchik River basin and the Kurama range between 1973 and 1976, while additional introductions from the Kochkor Valley into the Naryn-Atbashi valleys had already taken place during the first half of the 20th century. More recently, pheasants have colonised the Aidar-Arnasai lake system in the southeastern Kyzylkum Desert. The now-extinct population of the former northeastern Aral Sea islands Uzun-Kair and Uyaly may have represented a distinct subspecies "bergii". The range of the Syr Daria Pheasant is bounded in the southeast by parts of the Tian-Shan and Alai Mountains, and in the south by the Alai and Gissar Mountains, which separate it from P. c. shawi, P. c. bianchii and P. c. zerafshanicus. The subspecies extends south to approximately Bekabad and Zarbdor and to the foothills of the Tien Shan in the southern Ferghana Valley. To the west, the Kyzylkum Desert separates it from P. c. chrysomelas, although their ranges may formerly have met along the eastern shores of the Aral Sea. In the northeast, the Karatau, Kyrgyz, and Terskey ranges separate it from the closely related P. c. mongolicus.

Habitat: Two principal habitat types are occupied. Firstly, in the river valleys, it inhabits reed beds, shrub thickets, and tugai vegetation, generally close to water; extensive closed-canopy tugai forests are used less frequently. In the Angren River floodplain, tugai consists of dense willow thickets with abundant tamarisk, salt-tree, and rosehip shrubs, providing food resources through rosehips, oleaster, and sea-buckthorn. In the Syr Darya Valley, pheasants most frequently occur in areas rich in lakes and streams, where the terrain is highly heterogeneous owing to differences in soil moisture; they are also commonly encountered on the margins of the Kyzylkum Desert, inhabiting deep depressions among undulating dunes overgrown with grasses and shrubs. In the Syr Darya floodplain, tugai vegetation is dominated by poplar stands in which various species of poplar mixed with oleaster predominate; these are typically bordered by liquorice-saltwort plant communities. Habitat structure ranges from dense, virtually impenetrable thickets with little herbaceous growth to sparse woodland interspersed with meadow vegetation. Around Lake Aydarkul, newly developing tugai consists primarily of reed beds associated with stands of karelinia and wild lettuce. Turanga occurs as scattered groups among the woody vegetation but does not form continuous stands. In dune depressions approximately one kilometre from the lakeshore, dense thickets of tamarisk, wild lettuce, and karelinia develop, and pheasants occur there year-round. Secondly, the montane form ("triznae") inhabits steep mountain thickets of wild rose, barberry, hawthorn, and other shrubs, as well as riparian scrub and shrubby walnut forests, up to about 1,500 m above sea level. It occasionally ascends to higher elevations, having been recorded at Lake Sary-Chilek (1,873 m) and at Gulcha pass (3,416 m). In the Sary-Chelek Mountains, it nests only in apple forests and open juniper woodlands.

==== 1.3.2. Phasianus colchicus mongolicus (Kyrgyz pheasant) ====
Authority and original description: Brandt, J. F. 1844.

Type locality: Altai region.

Protonym and synonyms:

- Phasianus mongolicus Brandt, 1844 — protonym
- Phasianus brandti Rothschild, 1901 — junior synonym
- Phasianus semitorquatus Severtsov, 1875 — junior synonym

Local names: Жетісу қырғауылы (Kazakh: Semirechye Pheasant), Жети–Суу кыргоолу (Kyrgyz: Semirechye Pheasant), Семиреченск қирғовули (Uzbek: Semirechye Pheasant), Семиреченский фазан (Russian: Semirechye Pheasant), 雉鸡准葛尔亚种 (Chinese: Junggar subspecies of Common Pheasant)

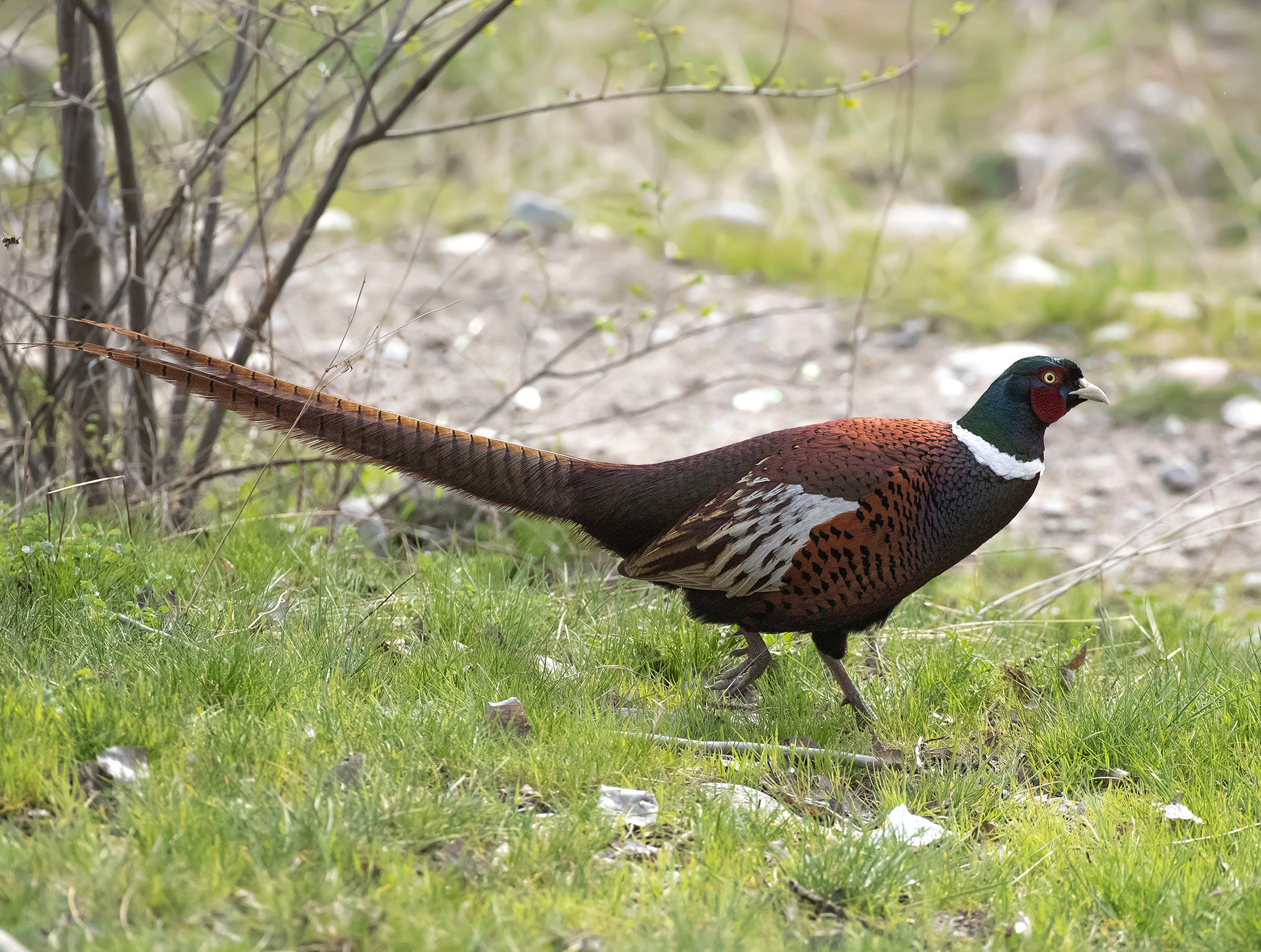
Phasianus colchicus mongolicus, Almaly District, Almaty, Kazakhstan.

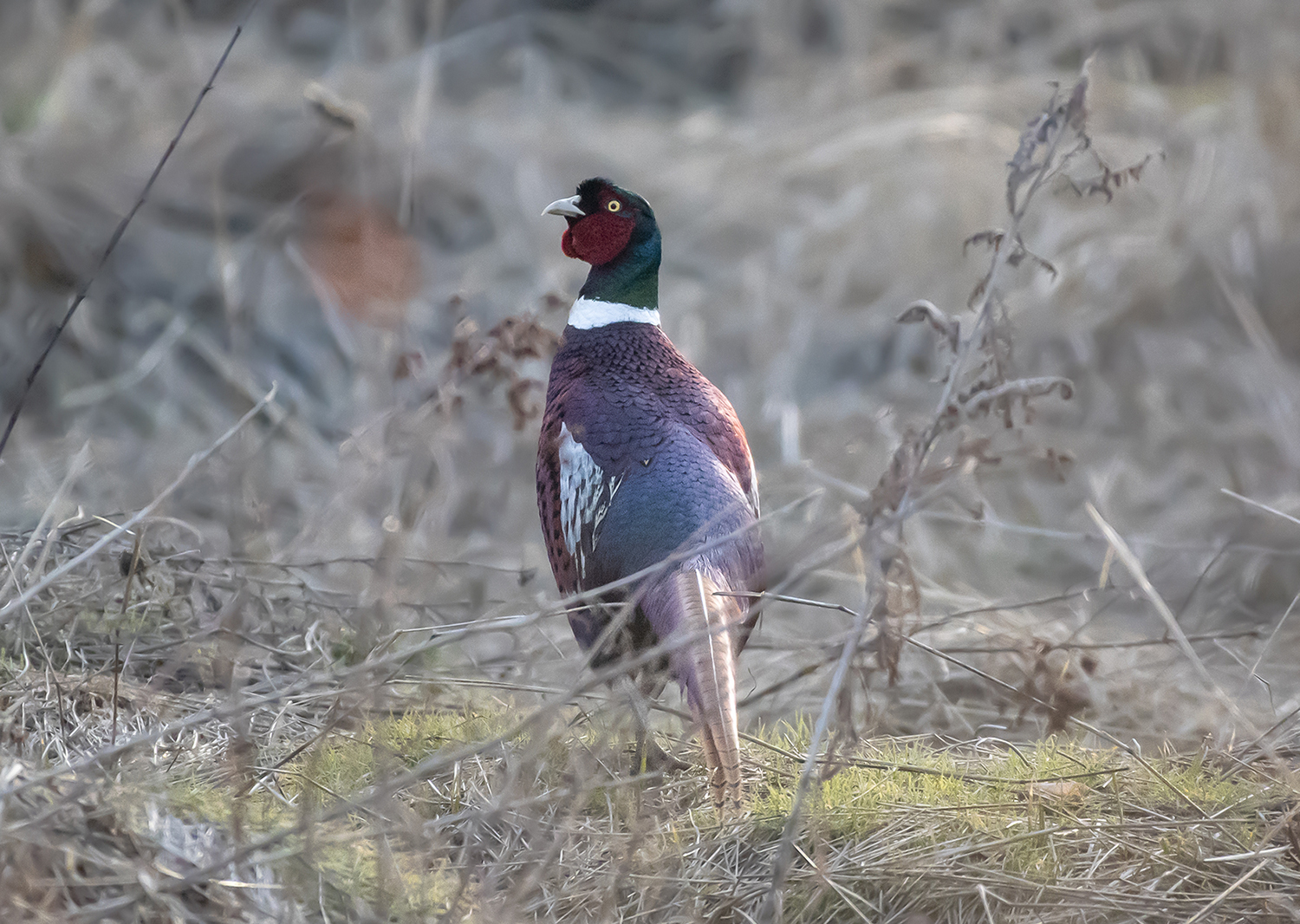
Phasianus colchicus mongolicus, Oktyabr District, Bishkek, Kyrgyzstan.

Description: The male differs from the subspecies to the west and south in that the coppery-red ground colour predominates on the anterior part of the back. The crown and occiput are dark metallic green or greenish-bronze, changing to a strong purple under certain lighting angles. A fairly broad white collar (up to 1 cm wide) is present, but it narrows sharply on the front of the neck and is usually widely interrupted there. Across the subspecific range, populations follow a clinal gradient where the eastern Semirechye form features a wider collar with a weaker green gloss, whereas the western Dzungarian variant features a narrower, highly interrupted collar accompanied by a darker, stronger green gloss. The upper wing-coverts are white. The mantle, chest, and breast are bronzy orange-red, showing a purple-carmine gloss in certain light and a green gloss in others; the breast and flanks are tipped with blackish green, while the centre of the breast and the sides of the abdomen are dark green. The crop and breast are reddish-brown, the feathers having broad dark metallic-green margins; in different light, however, they appear fiery golden-brown-red, with narrow black terminal edges; the feathers of the sides are lighter, more golden, and have broad black terminal margins with a green gloss. A broad zone at the front of the belly usually shows a predominance of green iridescence, although in some individuals it is more rufous. The upper tail-coverts have a strong green sheen and may appear purple from certain angles. Compared with P. c. turcestanicus, this subspecies generally exhibits more green and less blue-violet gloss, particularly on the upper back, crop, and forechest, with a less intensely red rump and a more bronze-green head. The female resembles that of P. c. chrysomelas, but differs in having a black spot near the tip of each upper mantle feather and a black median bar instead of a broad black submarginal border.

Photographs: Photographs are available from Almaty Region in Kazakhstan, from south of Kapshagay Reservoir, and from Daquangou Reservoir in Xinjiang.

Measurements: Male wing length: Ogilvie-Grant: 244 mm; Hartert: n = 26: 250–267 mm; Dementyev: n = 18: 250–273 mm (mean 260 mm); Vaurie: n = 10: 248–260 mm (mean 254 mm).

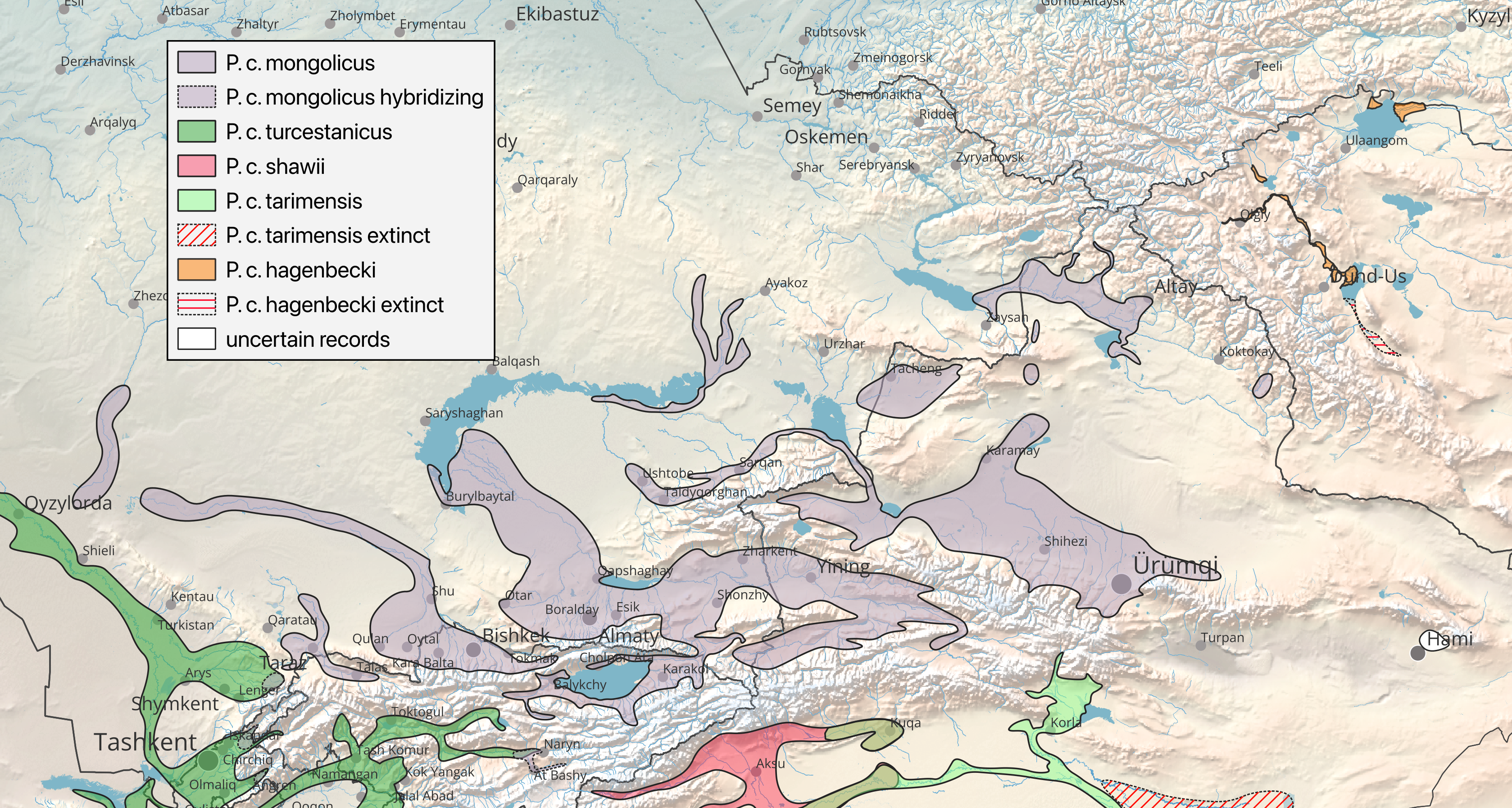
Distribution range of P. c. mongolicus.

Distribution: Northern Tian Shan in northern Kyrgyzstan, eastern Kazakhstan east of the Kyrgyz Alatau, and northwestern Xinjiang, east to Urumchi. In the west, it occurs along the Talas River valley and along the Chu River valley as far as Tokmak. It formerly occurred in the area of the Telikul Lakes in the lower reaches of the Sarysu River. The subspecies inhabits the foothills and lower parts of most gorges on the northern slopes of the Trans-Ili Alatau, ascending to 2,510 m above sea level at Big Almaty Lake. It also occurs in the Chu-Ili Mountains and enters several gorges of the Kyrgyz Alatau, particularly in the area of Ala-Archa National Park. It is distributed throughout the basins of the Lakes Issyk-Kul and Balkash and along their tributaries. In the Issyk-Kul Basin, it penetrates the lower parts of the gorges along the Karakol, Tyup, Dzhergalan, and Jety–Oguz rivers, reaching the coniferous forest belt. In the Talas Valley, it nests throughout the valley and is particularly common in the river's lower reaches. It also occurs along the shores of Lake Biylikol and has recently expanded across the Chokpak saddle into the Aksu-Dzhabagly Nature Reserve, where it comes into contact with P. c. turcestanicus. Humans introduced the subspecies into parts of the range of P. c. turcestanicus, including the Chirchik River basin between 1973 and 1976 and in the Kurama Range in 1975; additional introductions from the Kochkor Valley into the Atbashi and lower Naryn valleys took place during the 1880s and 1890s. To the east, the range extends to Alakol and Zaisan, where the subspecies had disappeared and was subsequently reintroduced. It inhabits the valleys of Ili (upstram to Kuldja), Jumgal, Talkar, Charyn, Chilik, Turgen, and Lepsi rivers. Further east in the Tian-Shan, it ascends to high elevations along the Tekes and Künes river valleys, both tributaries of the Ili, and from there occurs throughout southern Dzungaria as far as Kuldja, Ürümqi, and Guchen in the east and Lake Ebi-Nor in the west. In China, it is distributed along the Tekes and Gongnaisi rivers in northwestern Xinjiang, extending eastward into the central Tian Shan and northward into the Dzungarian Basin. It has been recorded from the following counties and regions of Xinjiang: Xinyuan, Gongliu, Tekes, Zhaosu, Nileke, Ili River Valley, Yining, Huocheng, Chabuchar, Bole (Bozhou), Ebi Lake, Jinghe, Ganjiahu, Gurtu, Wusu, Kuitun, Shawan, Shihezi, Manas, Changji, Ürümqi, Junggar Basin, Yumin, Tacheng, Emin River Basin, Karamay, Ailik Lake, Altai, Dahalasu. The Altai Mountains form a barrier between P. c. mongolicus and P. c. hagenbecki.

Habitat: Reeds and tugai thickets along rivers; shrubby thickets on mountain slopes within the deciduous forest belt (poplar forests); also reed beds and shrubby thickets (mainly sea-buckthorn) on treeless mountain slopes. Proximity to water is mandatory. In the lower reaches of the Ili, Karatal, Aksu, and Chu, it is associated with riparian thickets composed of sedge, willow, and occasionally poplar. The riparian undergrowth typically consists of dense shrubs of chingil, rose hips, and tamarisk, while tall grasses and blackberries form the lower layer; these thickets are often intertwined with vines. It also inhabits dense stands of steppe vegetation ("kuray" thickets), as well as areas near cultivated fields. There is a tendency for the pheasant to occupy mountainous areas in the juniper belt up to 1,500 m above sea level, along the shores of mountain lakes overgrown with bulrushes. It ascends river valleys to elevations of up to 1,200 m, where shrubby thickets occur along the riverbanks. In summer, it is confined to grass-forb complexes. In winter, its habitat is closely linked to food availability; pheasants are typically found in hawthorn or rosehip thickets, where food remains available even during heavy snowfall. In the Tian Shan, it occurs at elevations of 1,800–2,000 m. Along the Bayankol, Narynkol, and Tekesu (Central Tian Shan), it inhabits a distinctive tugai forest composed of caragana, roses, sea-buckthorn, willow, birch, and even savin juniper and solitary Schrenk's spruce. In Ala-Archa National Park, it nests not only in tugai thickets but also in spruce and juniper forests. In the Issyk-Kul basin, the main biotope is sea-buckthorn thickets along the lake shores; on the Toru-Aygyr Peninsula (Issyk-Kul), it nests on hummocky sands with saltwort thickets. On the southern shore of Biyli-Kul (at the foot of Karatau), it was formerly forced by grazing cattle to spend the day in flooded reed beds on small dry islands. In the cultivated zones of foothills and lowlands, it readily inhabits fields with grain, fodder, and vegetable crops, as well as neglected gardens and even parks, such as the Almaty Botanical Garden.

=== 1.4. Tarimensis group (Tarim pheasants) ===
This group comprises a single subspecies primarily distributed across the eastern Tarim Basin. Males completely lack a white neck ring, typically showing absolutely no traces of white markings around the neck region. The upper wing-coverts are light sandy-brown to sandy-rufous, while the upper tail-coverts are characteristically light greenish yellow-brown, greenish-buff, or olive-yellow. The orange-golden or golden-brown feathers of the back and chest are narrow and uniquely deeply notched or pointedly emarginated at their tips, completely lacking any dark black terminal margins. Females closely resemble those of the white-winged group, but are overall paler than the western white-winged forms. Male wing length averages approximately 240 mm, comparable to that of the neighbouring P. c. shawii and P. c. satscheuensis.

==== 1.4.1. Phasianus colchicus tarimensis (Tarim basin pheasant) ====
Authority and original description: Pleske, T. 1889.

Type locality: From Karashar (present-day Yanqi Hui Autonomous County), in the lower valley of the Tarim River and the valley of the Cherchen Darya, to the shores of Lob-nor.

Protonym and synonyms:

- Phasianus tarimensis Pleske, 1889 — protonym
- Phasianus tarimensis Przewalski, 1883 - nomen nudum

Local names: 雉鸡塔里木亚种 (Chinese: Tarim subspecies of Common Pheasant)

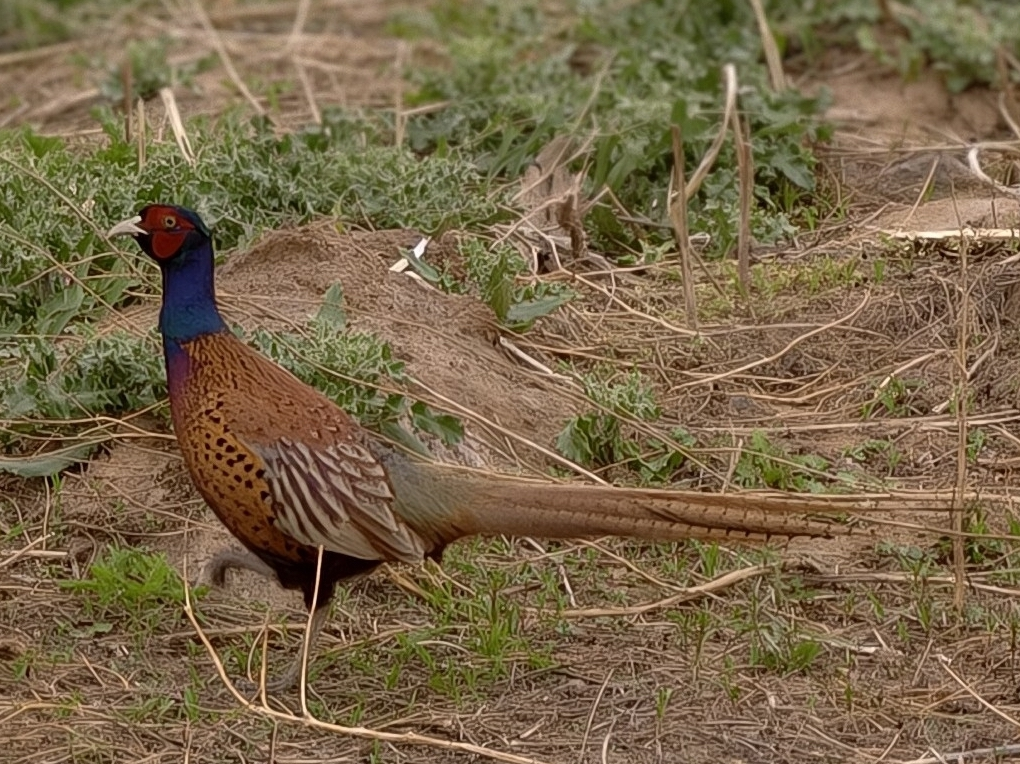
Phasianus colchicus tarimensis, Kuqa, Aksu, Xinjiang

Description: The males have a bronze-green crown and occiput and a dark green throat; the hindneck is greenish-blue and the neck blue. There are no whitish supraorbital lines or white collar, showing absolutely no traces of white around the neck region. The lesser upper wing-coverts are pale grey or bluish-grey; the remaining wing-coverts are light sandy- or yellowish-brown with a faint green gloss, the greater coverts marked with chestnut. These contrast with the yellowish-white wing-coverts of P. c. shawii, the silvery-white coverts of P. c. mongolicus, and the ashy grey or lavender-grey fields of the eastern forms. The upper back is metallic golden- to orange-brown; its feathers are narrow, deeply indented, bearing a small bluish-black wedge-shaped terminal shaft-spot and completely lacking dark margins. The lower back, rump, and upper tail-coverts are olive-yellow, olive-green, pale yellow or greenish-buff ground colouration with a significant mix of green and ochre; the tract features an intense green coloration or green and black mottling, a broad metallic blue-green subterminal band, and the hair-like terminal fringes are pale greenish-yellow or buff. The crop is dark glossy green, more restricted than in P. c. shawii, and sharply demarcated from the fiery coppery-red breast, wichi is glossed with oily green and purple. The breast feathers are narrow, deeply indented, and lack dark margins except for a narrow dark shaft-mark along the median indentation; the lower breast and sides of the abdomen are deep glossy blue-green, and this blue-green colouration often extends onto the middle of the breast. The flanks are coppery- to golden-orange with small iridescent bluish- to purplish-black markings, lacking multi-lobed notched structure. The centre of the abdomen is dull brownish-black. The central tail-feathers are sandy-cinnamon to yellowish-ochre, narrowly barred with black or dark brown, with the pale interspaces being buff rather than olive; on their basal halves, these dark bars typically measure 2 mm or less in width. P. c. tarimensis differs from P. c. shawii in its brownish-grey wing-coverts, olive-yellow rump and upper tail-coverts, and the absence of dark borders on the crop feathers. The female resembles that of P. c. shawii, but is overall paler than that of other members of the chrysomelas-principalis-group.

Photographs: Photographs are available from Kuqa City and the Tarim River region.

Measurements: Male wing length: Ogilvie-Grant: 236 mm; Hartert, Delacour: n = 4: 236–247 mm; Abdulali: n=1: 248 mm; Zheng et al.: n = 1: 240 mm.

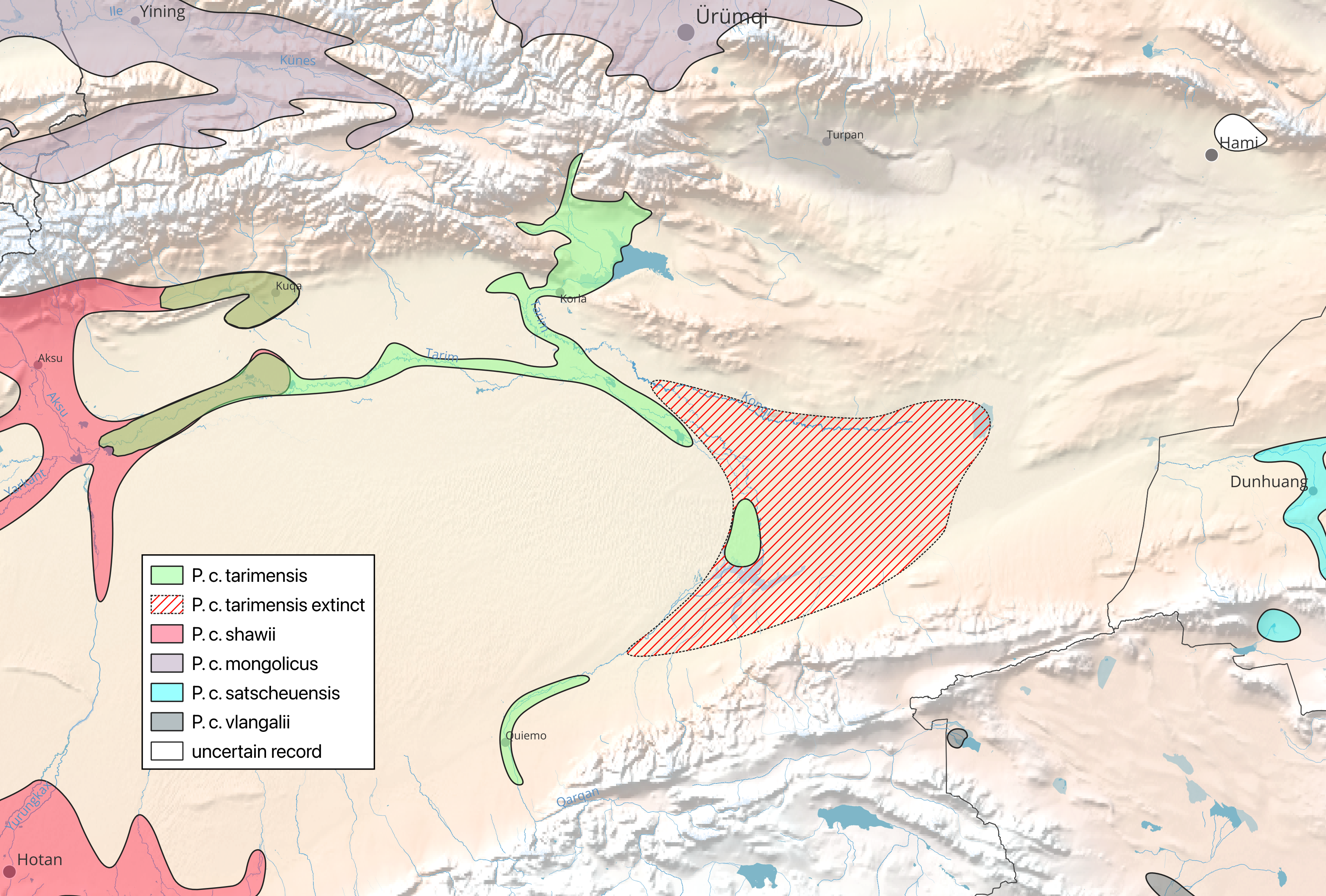
Distribution range of P. c. tarimensis.

Distribution: Eastern and southern Tarim Basin in western China (lower Tarim and Cherchen Darya rivers, as well as the lakes Bagrach-Kul and former Lop Nur), including a former eastern Tarim distributary associated with Lop Nur. It occurs in Xinjiang's Aksu Prefecture (Aral, Tarim River Basin, Shaya, Kuqa), and Baylingolin Prefecture (Luntai, Korla, Puhui, Yanqi, Bosten Lake, Heshuo, Yuli, Kongque River, Qiala Reservoir, Donghetan Lake, Lop Nur, Ruoqiang, Qiemo, Cherchen River Basin, Hejing), and possibly locally in the Turpan Basin. In the western part of its range, it meets the easternmost populations of the Yarkand Pheasant P. c. shawii. A hybrid zone occurs along the Tarim River, extending from Xayar County westward to the confluence of the Tarim with the Khotan and Aksu rivers. To the north and northwest, the Tian Shan Mountains separate it from P. c. mongolicus. To the east, the waterless Kum-Tag Desert separates P. c. tarimensis from the grey-rumped P. c. satscheuensis, while in the southeast it is separated from P. c. vlangalii by the Altyn-Tagh range. A major change in its distribution occurred following the establishment of the Daxihaizi Reservoir in 1972, which led to the disappearance of the Lop Nur wetlands and the loss of poplar forests and tamarisk shrubs that were formerly widespread along the lower Tarim River valley. Efforts to restore the Lop Nur ecosystem have been ongoing since 2000.

Habitat: Reed thickets and riparian areas with tall grasses. The Tarim River tugay is dominated on lower river terraces by desert poplar (Populus euphratica), together with Elaeagnus angustifolia. The undergrowth includes willows, sea-buckthorn, Indian hemp and Ural liquorice. The upper river terraces support drier forests and shrubby woodlands, with Tamarix ramosissima and Halostachys caspica alongside Populus euphratica and other salt-tolerant halophyte species. In 1889/90, Pevtsov described the Cherchen Darya valley, home to P. c. tarmensis, as being covered with poplar forest, thickets, shrubs, and reeds.

=== 2. Eastern group (Grey-rumped pheasants) ===
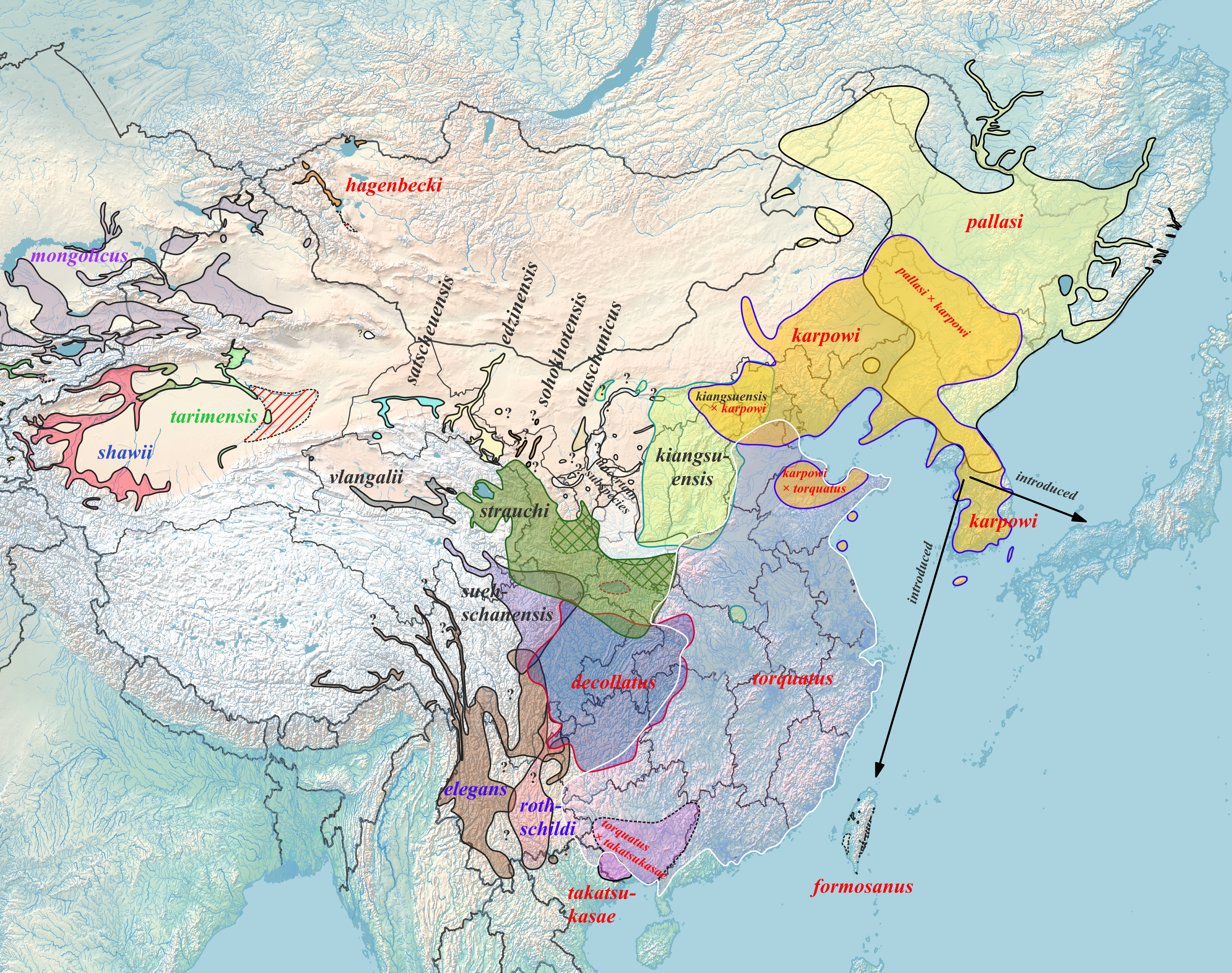
Distribution of the grey-rumped subspecies of Phasianus colchicus.

The lower back, rump, and central upper tail-coverts are light lavender-blue, greenish-grey, yellowish-grey, or olive-green, without any red or rufous tinge; a rusty orange patch is present on each side of the rump. The dark bars on the basal half of the central rectrices are generally broad (3–4 mm). The lesser and median wing-coverts are lavender-grey or pale sandy-ochraceous, never whitish or rufous. A white supercilium may be present or absent.

=== 2.1. Elegans group (Yunnan pheasants) ===
This group comprises subspecies distributed across eastern Tibet, western Sichuan, northwestern and southeastern Yunnan, northwestern Vietnam, and northern Myanmar. In males, a white neck collar and white orbital lines are absent. A broad band of richly glossed dark green or bluish green plumage extends along the underparts, completely separating the brassy-chestnut sides of the breast. The crown is dark copper-green, and the upper tail-coverts are light bluish-grey. Females are strongly contrasting in appearance, with irregularly black-barred underparts and a white chin, throat, and foreneck. The subspecies of this group are the smallest among all P. colchicus subspecies, with male wing lengths averaging only approximately 220 mm and not exceeding 240 mm.

==== 2.1.1. Phasianus colchicus elegans (Stone's grey-rumped pheasant) ====
Authority and original description: Elliot, D. G. 1870.

Type locality: Province of Szechuan (Sichuan), near its southwestern border.

Protonym and synonyms:

- Phasianus elegans Elliot, 1870 — protonym
- Phasianus sladeni Elliot, ex Anderson, 1870 — nomen nudum

Local names: 雉鸡川南亚种 (Chinese: Southern Sichuan subspecies of Common Pheasant)

Description: The male has a dark green head, neck, and breast, while the crown and occiput range from bronze-green to dark copper-green. A white eyebrow line and a white neck ring or collar are completely absent. The upper wing-coverts are characteristically bluish-grey or greenish-grey, avoiding the light tones seen in other groups. The broad feather margins of the upper back are unusually pale reddish-brown with a yellow-green or golden-red gloss depending on the angle of light. The feather tips are deeply and narrowly notched and lack black shaft streaks or wedges, or show only very narrow ones, which constitutes one of the principal diagnostic characters of this subspecies; furthermore, only the feathers nearest the neck possess black lateral margins. Only the feathers nearest the neck possess black lateral margins. The golden-chestnut colouration of the upper back changes to deep chestnut on the back and scapulars, though the mantle is alternatively described as chestnut with green feather tips. The lower back and rump are dark green broadly edged with grey, or greenish-grey marked with metallic green anchor-shaped spots. The upper tail-coverts are greenish-grey, with the outermost feather on each side being rusty red or orange. The tail is chestnut-red or rufous-brown with broad black cross-bars. The underparts are glossy, dark green to steel blue. This dark green colouration extends uninterrupted to the middle of the breast and chest, unlike in P. c. decollatus and P. c. strauchi, where it is cut by yellow or coppery bands; consequently, a broad band of richly glossed dark plumage extends along the underparts, completely separating the brassy-chestnut flanks. The flanks and the sides of the breast are golden coppery maroon, becoming almost purple copper next to the green of the breast. The centre of the belly is deep brown. Compared to other taxa, P. c. elegans differs from P. c. suehschanensis by being blacker below with more extensive purple-blue gloss on the breast, and by lacking broad black wedges on the upper back. It differs from P. c. vlangalii in having coppery-maroon rather than golden-buff flanks and maroon rather than sandy-red mantle and scapulars, and by having more reddish and less maroon colouration on the scapulars. It is distinguished from members of the torquatus group by the much broader black bars on the basal portion of the central tail feathers, by its darker mantle and scapular feathers, by the more extensively dark-green-spotted tips of the upper mantle feathers, and by having relatively broad sub-terminal dark-green bands on the lower back and rump feathers. The female resembles those of other eastern subspecies but differs from that of P. c. colchicus in having a white throat and foreneck, as well as irregularly black-barred underparts.

Photographs: High-quality photographs are available from Sichuan.

Measurements: Male wing length: Ogilvie-Grant: 231 mm; Baker: 210.8-228.6 mm; Delacour: 220–230 mm; Vaurie: n = 10: 219–236 mm (mean 228 mm); Abdulali: n=4: 216, 220, 223, 225 mm (mean 221 mm); Zheng: n = 8: 205–230 mm; Zheng et al.: n = 2: 215–235 mm (mean 225 mm); Wu et al.: n = 14: 210–231 mm (mean 220.3 mm); Liu et al.: n = 8: 217–240 mm (mean 228.6 mm); Yang et al.: n = 11: 204–226 mm (mean 214.5 mm); Tang et al.: n = 9: 204–225 mm (mean 217 mm).

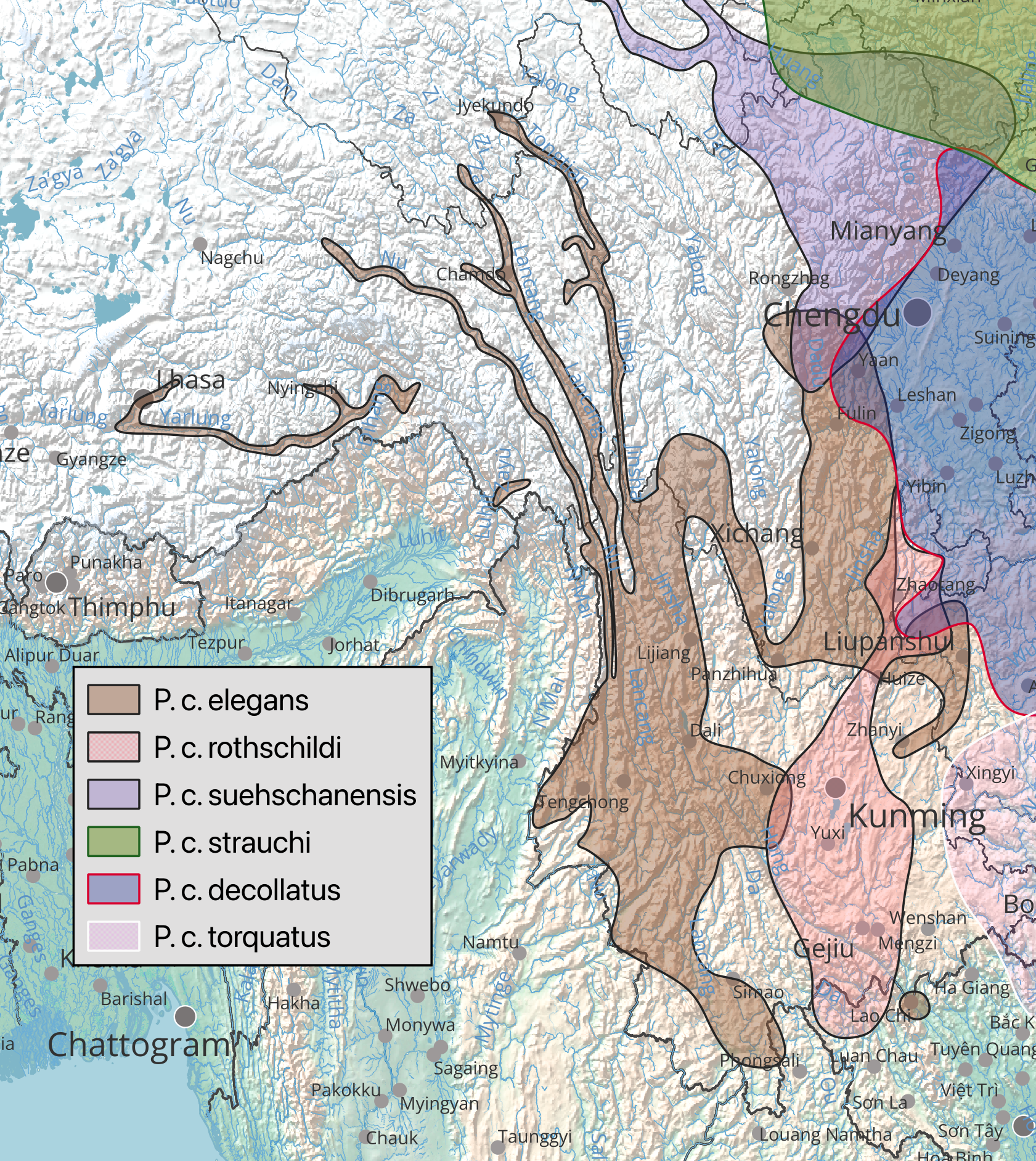
Distribution range of P. c. elegans.

Distribution: Western Sichuan (Emei, Mabian, Leshan, Nanchuan, Xichang, Huidong, Muli, Kangding, Batang, Ebian, and Meigu counties), Yunnan (Yongshan, Ludian, Qiandian, Jingdong, Binchuan, Lijiang, Lushui, Zhongdian, Deqin, and Tengchong), eastern Tibet (Jiali, Biru, and the river valleys of Xiaobangda District, Markam County), and extreme western Guizhou (Hezhang, Weining, and Panxian counties); also northern Myanmar (Kachin Hills and northern Shan State). Hybrid populations have been reported in northeastern Yunnan with P. c. rothschildi in Yongshan County (Huashiban, 滑石板, and Yongan, 永安村) and Ludian County (Dashuijing, 大水井乡), and with P. c. decollatus in Yongshan County (Xuebai, 雪柏村, and Malan, 马楠乡). In western Guizhou, near Liangshan (凉山) in Weining County, hybridisation with P. c. rothschildi has also been recorded. In Ganzi Prefecture, this subspecies occurs in the Jinsha and Yalong River basins, whereas P. c. suehschanensis populates the Dadu River basin.

Habitat: Hillside thickets; slopes and mountain summits covered with tall grasses and ferns; and sparse coniferous forests. In western Sichuan, it typically occurs at elevations of 1,500–3,000 m. Wilson recorded it in the vicinity of Kangding at 2,400–2,900 m. In Guizhou, it occurs at 1,800–2,600 m, while in Yunnan it has been recorded from 1,700–3,350 m. In Tibet, it ascends to elevations of up to 3,800 m. In western Yunnan, it was observed in April north of Yulong Snow Mountain (Lijiang) at elevations above 3,000 m; in April–May southwest of Ludianxiang, on the southern slopes of the Jinsha-Lancang watershed, above 3,000 m in spruce and fir forest; and in August northwest of Cigu (Deqen), on the western slopes of the Jinsha-Lancang watershed, above 3,600 m in fir and rhododendron forests.

==== 2.1.2. Phasianus colchicus rothschildi (Rothschild's grey-rumped pheasant) ====
Authority and original description: La Touche, J. D. D. 1922.

Type locality: Mountains near Mengtsz, southeastern Yunnan.

Protonym and synonyms:

- Phasianus colchicus rothschildi — protonym

Local names: 雉鸡滇南亚种 (Chinese: Southern Yunnan subspecies of Common Pheasant), Trĩ đỏ (Vietnamese: Red Pheasant)

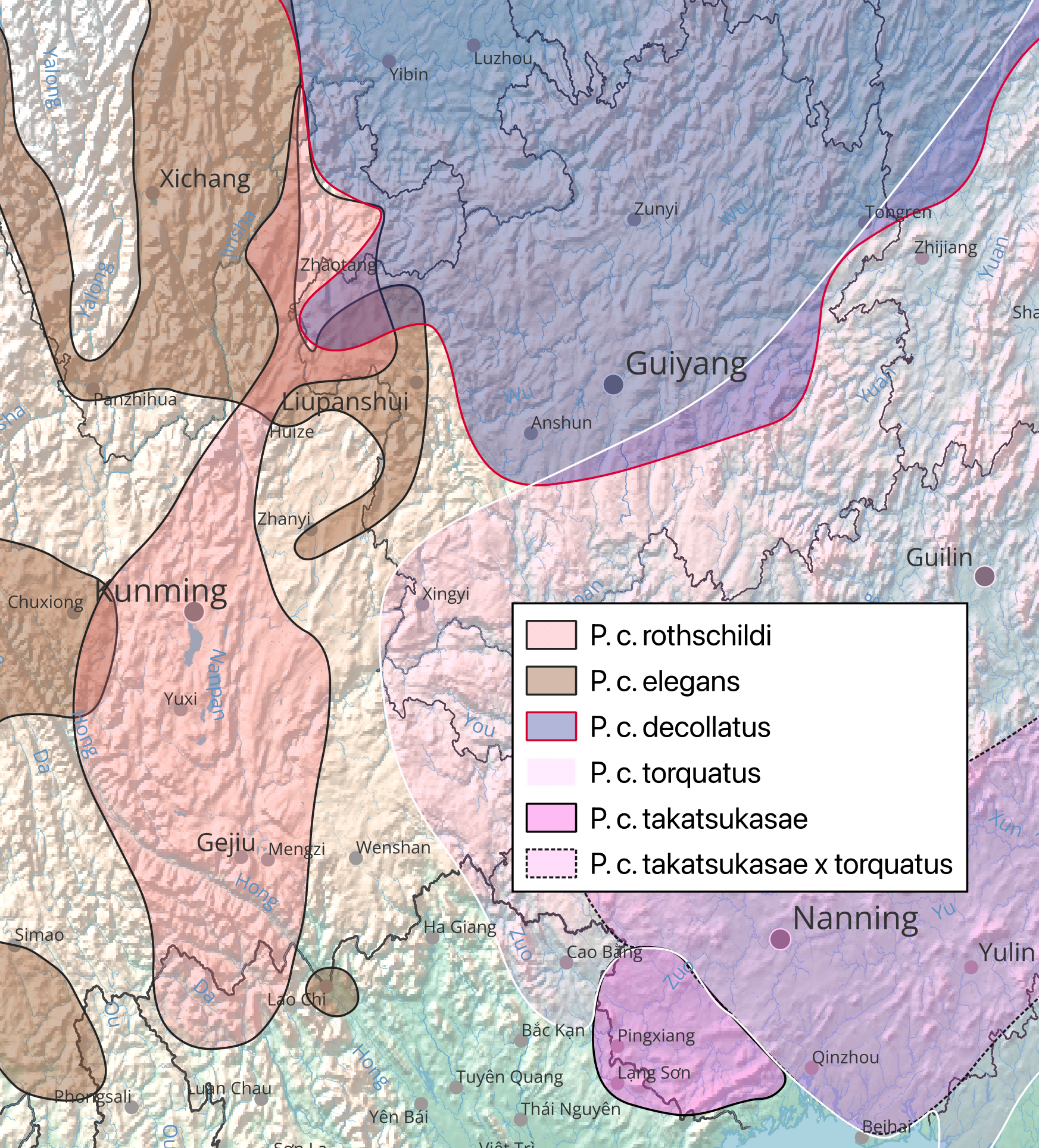
Distribution range of P. c. rothschildi.

Description: This subspecies combines characteristics of both P. c. elegans and P. c. suehschanensis by pairing a dark green chest with lighter, more golden upperparts. It is generally similar to P. c. elegans, but the blue metallic area of the breast is more restricted to the centre, the flanks and mantle are paler and more golden, and a vestigial white collar is occasionally present as minimal remnants. It differs from P. c. elegans in having a conspicuously paler lower hindneck that shows pale coppery-gold rather than coppery-chestnut reflections. Furthermore, in worn spring plumage, the pale-yellow feather margins of the interscapular region become even paler and yellower; in contrast, worn spring-plumaged P. c. elegans retains the strong coppery colouration across all stages of plumage wear. The feathers on the sides of the breast and the flanks are pale chestnut, shading cleanly into gold on their terminal half. The upper surface of the tail is olive rather than deep chestnut-red, and the tail is lighter overall. The breast is glossy dark blue shot with a green, though some individuals exhibit a green upper breast paired with a deep ruby-coloured lower breast. It differs from P. c. suehschanensis by its fine black lines and by having only very narrow black shaft wedges on the feathers of the upper back. Hybrids between P. c. elegans and P. c. rothschildi are characterised by a maroon to brownish-maroon upper back and golden-brown to brownish-maroon flanks, resembling P. c. elegans; however, the dark green area of the chest is more restricted, and the green colouration is confined to the central part of the chest and tinged with red, resembling P. c. rothschildi. In hybrids with P. c. decollatus, the chest is rich copper-red, as in P. c. decollatus, whereas the upperparts and flanks retain the colouration of P. c. rothschildi; the black markings on the lower flanks may resemble either parental subspecies. The female of P. c. rothschildi stands out as the most heavily marked female among all subspecies, with only three specific portions—the center of the breast, the chin, and the upper throat—showing little to no markings.

Photographs: No photographs appear to be currently available online.

Measurements: Male wing length: Delacour, Vo: 210–230 mm; Zheng, Liu et al.: n = 3: 210–218 mm (mean 213.3 mm); Yang et al.: n = 9: 208–240 mm (mean 222.6 mm).

Distribution: In China, this subspecies occurs in southeastern Yunnan (Jinping, Pingbian, Mengzi, Shiping, Xinping, Eshan, Jiangchuan, Kunming, Anning, Yiliang of Kunming, Shizong, Xundian, Yongshan, Zhaotong, Yiliang of Zhaotong, and other localities). It also occurs in northern Vietnam (northern Tonkin: Lào Cai, Yên Bái and Bắc Kạn), northern Laos, and eastern Myanmar. Hybrids with P. c. elegans have been recorded in Yongshan and Ludian counties, and hybrids with P. c. decollatus in Yiliang County in northeastern Yunnan. Intermediate individuals have also been observed in Nanhua County. It may additionally hybridise with P. c. torquatus southeast of the Yungui plateau. The precise distributional limits of this subspecies between Zhaotong and southern Yunnan remain unclear.

Habitat: similar to that of P. c. elegans. In Mengzi, it has been observed on grassland at an elevation of approximately 1,400 m.

=== 2.2. Strauchi-Vlangalii group (Western grey-rumped pheasants) ===
This group comprises subspecies distributed across the Qaidam Basin, eastern Qinghai, northeastern Sichuan, Inner Mongolia, Gansu, Ningxia, Shanxi, Shaanxi, and western Hebei (despite its name, P. c. kiangsuensis does not occur in Jiangsu). The males are characterised by a crown ranging from dark copper-green to pale green, often with olive or bluish tones. In the more southern subspecies (P. c. suehschanensis, P. c. vlangalii, P. c. strauchi, and P. c. sohokhotensis), white superciliary stripes are absent and the white collar is usually lacking or represented only by a vestigial trace. In the more northern subspecies (P. c. satscheuensis, P. c. edzinensis, P. c. alaschanicus, and P. c. kiangusensis), white superciliary stripes, or at least traces of them, are normally present, and the white collar is narrow but generally well-developed, though often interrupted anteriorly. The rich green colouration of the neck either extends uninterrupted to the belly, as in P. c. suehschanensis and, to a lesser extent, P. c. vlangalii, or is interrupted anteriorly by the golden or coppery colouration of the chest. In many forms, though not invariably, the colouration of the flanks and mantle grades into that of the chest and breast without sharp transitions. The upperparts vary from comparatively uniform to strongly patterned. In P. c. suehschanensis and P. c. vlangalii the exposed scapulars usually appear rather uniform, whereas in most other forms the scapulars usually show a distinct scaly pattern. The black apical markings on the flank feathers tend to take the form of transverse bands rather than isolated spots and may occupy a substantial portion of the feather tips. Clinal variation is evident throughout the group. From southwest to northeast, the proportion of individuals with white collars increases from less than 5% to more than 50%, while the proportion exhibiting a white superciliary stripe increases from less than 10% to more than 50%. Over the same geographic gradient, the dark green area of the chest becomes progressively narrower, and the colouration of the upperparts becomes progressively paler from south to north. The females of the darker forms (P. c. suehschanensis, P. c. strauchi, P. c. sohokhotensis, P. c. alaschanicus, and P. c. kiangsuensis) resemble those of the Caucasian group but show a dark green rather than purplish tint on the nape and mantle. The females of the remaining forms (P. c. vlangalii, P. c. satscheuensis, and P. c. edzinensis) are considerably paler, with predominantly reddish or pinkish tones. Male wing length is smallest in P. c. suehschanensis (~227 mm on average), and largest in P. c. vlangalii and P. c. alaschanicus (~245 mm on average).

==== 2.2.1. Phasianus colchicus vlangalii (Qaidam grey-rumped pheasant) ====
Authority and original description: Przevalski, N. M. 1876.

Type locality: Zaidam (= Qaidam, north‑central China).

Protonym and synonyms:

- Phasianus vlangalii Przevalski, 1876 (protonym)
- Phasianus colchicus vlangallii — alternate spelling
- Phasianus colchicus vlangali — invalid spelling variant

Local names: 雉鸡青海亚种 (Chinese: Qinghai subspecies of Common Pheasant)

Description: This subspecies is darker than P. c. satscheuensis with a main colouration varying from yellowish rust-brown, rufous-cinnamon, to pale chestnut. The uniform scapulars lack pale spots at their centre. The head and neck are metallic bronze-green with a bluish sheen, and the occiput features a greyish-olive patch. White superciliary stripes are generally absent, though some individuals can show faint, concealed traces of white eyebrows. A white collar is entirely missing, or reduced to faint, irregular traces on the nape or a narrow, interrupted white line on the hindneck. The mantle and scapulars are reddish-golden, each feather having a broad golden margin, a reddish-brown base, and matt black concealed bases nearest the neck. Feathers of the upper back can feature obvious glossy black apical shaft-streaks, wedges, or markings, which are relatively sparse and form small dark dots at the feather tips. Furthermore, the forward part of the back is variegated with large triangular dark green or green-bronze spots and incomplete borders, whereas the middle of the back and scapulars completely lack dark spots. The centre of the breast features a wide stripe of glossy dark green, while its sides are reddish-brown with a metallic sheen and dark-green margins on the notched feather tips. The abdomen is dark smoky grey, bordered laterally by dark green bands running from the breast. The flanks are golden buff, golden-yellow, or reddish-golden, carrying transverse dark blue spots at the feather tips, while the lower flank feathers can feature metallic violet tips. the inguinal feathers may have metallic-violet tips. The lower back is ash-grey with a greenish sheen, variegated with scale-like dark green spots edged internally by pale yellow and black lines, while the feathers of the rump are unspotted. At the sides, the rump features a distinct, prominent orange-red, rust-coloured, or bright cinnamon patch on the hair-like side tail-coverts. The upper wing-coverts are bluish-grey or ash-grey with a light greenish sheen and white shafts. The tail is reddish-brown or bronzy cinnamon with broad black cross-bars, and with the exception of four or five outer rectrices on each side, the tail feathers feature a wide light lilac border. This taxon differs from P. c. elegans by its bright sandy-red mantle and scapulars, and by its golden buff flanks rather than dull purple-glossed orange-red underparts. It is readily distinguished from P. c. strauchi and P. c. suehschanensis by its much lighter back and pale scapulars, which are yellowish rust-brown to golden orange rather than chestnut. The flank plumage is much lighter brownish-golden, the dark green area on the middle of the breast is less dark, and the black tail-bars are narrower compared to P. c. strauchi. The female of P. c. vlangalii is exceptionally pale and slightly marked, with buff and pale rufous tones widely predominating over faint black markings on the upperparts and flanks, while the throat, chin, and lores are whitish to pure white.

Photographs: Photographs are available from Haixi.

Measurements: Male wing length: Przevalski: 249–259 mm; Ogilvie-Grant: 241 mm; Delacour: 245–250 mm; Zheng: n = 2: 236–250 mm (mean 243 mm); Liu et al.: n = 3: 232–250 mm (mean 240.6 mm).

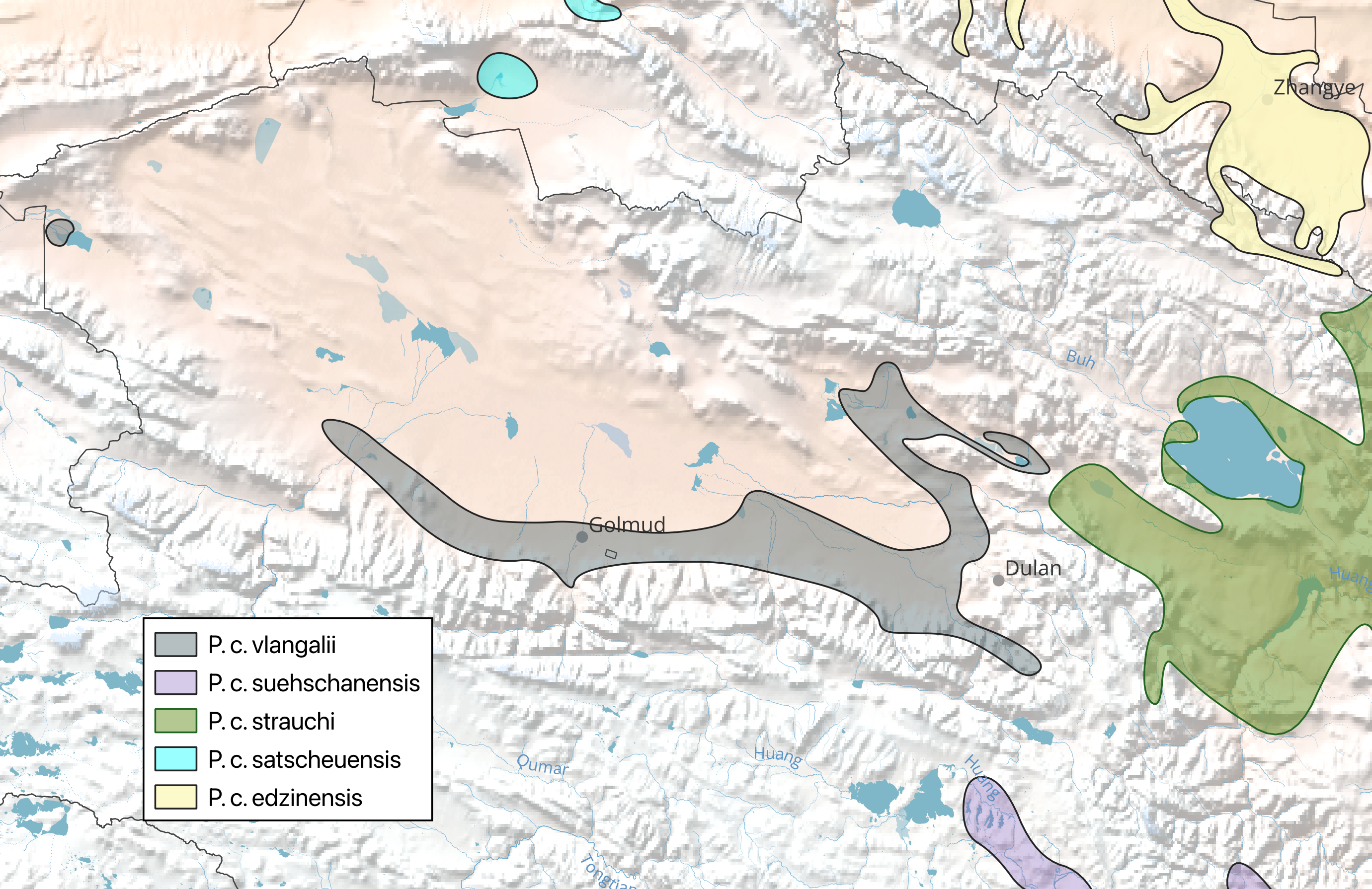
Distribution range of P. c. vlangalii.

Distribution: This subspecies is isolated in north-central China, inhabiting the reed swamps of the eastern Qaidam Basin in northwestern Qinghai. Its range lies between the mountain ranges southwest of Qinghai Lake to the north and the northern foothills of the Eastern Kunlun Range bordering the Qaidam basin to the South. It occurs along the Naren Guole, Qaidam, Golmud, Nuomuhong, and Tiekui rivers, as well as northward in the vicinity of Tuosu Lake and Xiligou Hu. Historically, its range extended farther west into the Qaidam swamps. The easternmost localities reported by Przevalski were the marshes surrounding the springs of the Tiekui River ("Irgitsyk" Marshes, northeastern Dulan County). Although historically isolated in the eastern Qaidam Basin, P. c. vlangalii may now come in contact with westward-expanding populations of P. c. strauchi in the valleys of the mountain ranges southwest of Qinghai Lake, between Chaka Yan Lake and Xilogou Hu. P. c. vlangalii is considered rare, and its current population size remains unknown. Recent photographic evidence from Golmud and Delingha demonstrates that the subspecies is still extant.

Habitat: The southern Qaidam Basin is characterised by saline loess-clay soils with a strongly uneven surface; along the narrow watercourses grow dense or scattered stands of harmyk (Nitraria schoberi) and tamarisk (Tamarix laxa); less common are sugak (Lycium ruthenicum, more rarely Lycium turcomanicum) and dogbane (Apocynum venetum); around springs and marshy areas, extensive reed beds of Phragmites australis occur; during the breeding season, pheasants select the drier portions of these wetlands, such as islets and spits covered with low reeds or sedge. In addition to various grasses, irises (Iris ssp.) and peaweed (Sphaerophysa salsula) are common, while cynomorium (Cynomorium coccineum) is also frequently present. The pheasant inhabits reed beds and bush-covered wetlands and feeds extensively on the berries of Nitraria during winter. The southern Qaidam plain lies at an elevation of approximately 2,800–3,000 m above sea level.

==== 2.2.2. Phasianus colchicus suehschanensis (Sungpan grey-rumped pheasant) ====
Authority and original description: Bianchi, V. L. 1906.

Type locality: Sungpan, northern Szechuan (Sichuan), China.

Protonym and synonyms:

- Phasianus süehschanensis Bianchi, 1906 (protonym)
- Phasianus colchicus suechanensis — invalid spelling variant

Local names: 雉鸡四川亚种 (Chinese: Sichuan subspecies of Common Pheasant)

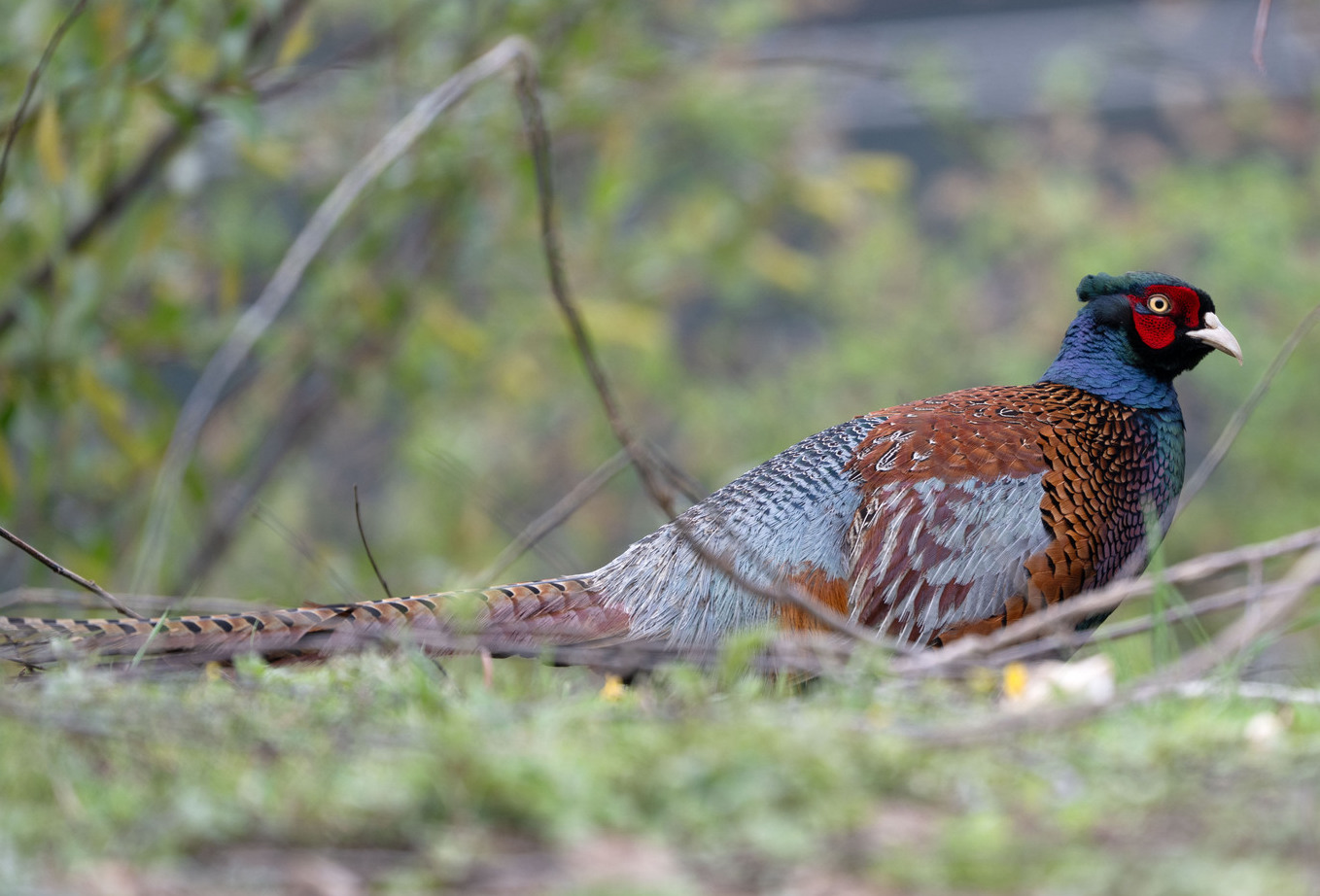
Phasianus colchicus suehschanensis, Songpan County, Sichuan, altitude 3260 m.

Description: This subspecies is strongly patterned, dark, and richly coloured, featuring coppery and maroon upperparts heavily glossed with bronze-green. The crown is dark bronzy-green or copper-green, exhibiting a bronze and purple sheen. White superciliary stripes and a white collar are entirely absent. The upper back is golden copper-red with well-developed metallic blue wedge-shaped shaft markings about 10 mm long and 4 mm wide, while the feather tips are frequently slightly whitish. The posterior interscapular region and scapulars are copper-brown with faint purple or green reflections, appearing as a uniform dark coppery-maroon on their exposed outer portions. Most of the characteristic patterning of the scapular feathers is concealed by overlapping feathers, giving the scapular region a uniform appearance. The lower back is particularly heavily and vividly mottled with black, buff, and green, showing ground tones of dark brown, slate colour, or greyish-blue. The hair-like upper tail-coverts are bluish-grey with an insignificant greenish tint, with the outermost tail-coverts being golden-reddish or rufous. The upper wing-coverts are pale blue-grey or ash-grey with a bluish-green sheen along the edge of the scapular region. The upper surface of the tail is considerably darker than in P. c. strauchi, being more purplish-brown, less ochraceous, and more heavily barred with black, or described as dark purplish-brown or vibrant red-brown. The underparts are reddish coppery-brown, extensively overlaid with a glossy green sheen, and the feathers are well-bordered with velvety black. A band of glossy purple-blue is present on the lower throat and sides of the lower neck, and a broad metallic-green median band extends uninterrupted from the crop to the belly, although the central breast is frequently mixed or suffused with copper-red, purplish-red, or purplish-bronze. This taxon closely resembles P. c. elegans but differs in having less deeply notched feathers on the upper back, which bear substantially broader and dark-blue shaft markings at their tips. The flank feathers are golden-brown to chestnut-brown with narrow black transverse apical bars across the entire feather width, which is highly similar to P. c. elegans and distinguishes them from the black spots on the flanks of P. c. strauchi and P. c. decollatus. The upper-back plumage is dark chestnut-brown with coarse black shaft spots, which is darker than in P. c. elegans, P. c. strauchi, and P. c. decollatus. In contrast, P. c. elegans has a chestnut-brown upper back and bears no or only very narrow black shaft markings. P. c. strauchi also possesses coarse black markings but has much paler golden-yellow ground colour, whereas P. c. decollatus shows even coarser black markings, combined with a light brownish-yellow ground colour. The female of P. c. suehschanensis is similar to female P. c. strauchi but somewhat darker above, and is dark and heavily marked generally. In the Min River valley, at elevations of 1,200–2,700 m, a hybrid population between P. c. suehschanensis and P. c. decollatus occurs and has been referred to as "P. c. berezowskii". Individuals referred to this population have been described as possessing a purplish crown, dark lustrous green neck, rich coppery-bronze chest and breast (the breast feathers narrowly margined with black), dark flanks, and slaty-blue rump.

Photographs: Photographs are available from Songpan County, near the type locality, in Sichuan.

Measurements: Male wing length: Bianchi: 230 mm; Delacour: 220–230 mm; Zheng: n = 5: 217–232 mm; Liu et al.: n = 15: 220–241 mm (mean 232.0 mm).

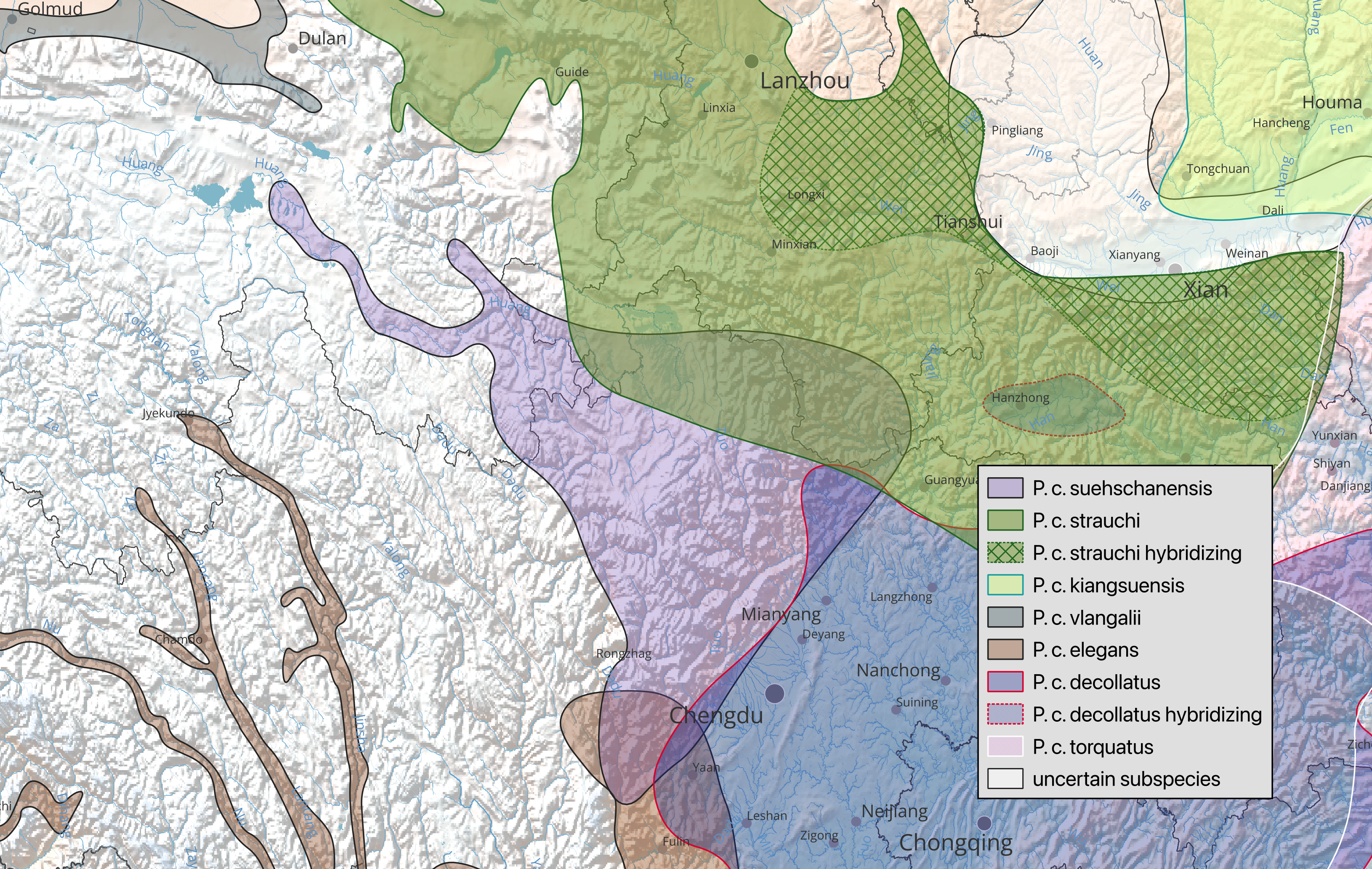
Distribution range of P. c. suehschanensis.

Distribution: West-central China, including the upper Min River valley, the southern slopes of the Min Shan range, and the Songpan in northwestern Sichuan, where it occurs in Dujiangyan, Pingwu, northern Baoxing, Wenchuan, Maoxian, Songpan, Jiuzhaigou, Zoigê, and Hongyuan counties. In Ganzi Prefecture, it is found along the Dadu River valley in Kangding, Luding and Danba. To the south, it has occasionally been reported from Zeku (泽库) in southeast Qinghai, Jangda in Tibet, and the northeastern corner of the Tibet Autonomous Region. These records require confirmation, as they are widely disjunct from the core range of P. c. suehschanensis and separated from it by extensive mountain systems. The subspecies has occasionally been reported from scattered localities in southern Gansu, although the taxonomic identity of these birds remains uncertain. In the southernmost parts of its range, P. c. strauchi may occasionally develop a metallic green band extending to the belly, resembling P. c. suehschanensis, and misidentifications are therefore possible.

Habitat: This subspecies is resident in the mountains of northern Sichuan throughout the year. It inhabits brush-covered mountain slopes and summits with tall grasses and ferns, ranging up to the upper limit of cultivation at approximately 3,500 m. In the upper Min River valley, it is most commonly found at elevations of 2,400–2,600 m, although Wilson noted that it may occasionally descend to about 1,800 m. In Wenchuan, it has been recorded at 1,800 m. In northern Baoxing, it occupies the evergreen and deciduous broad-leaved forest belt and the lower mixed broad-leaved and coniferous forest belt. During summer, it occurs mainly between 2,500 and 3,500 m, descending to 1,500 to 2,500 m in winter. By contrast, P. c. decollatus, which is restricted to central and southwestern Baoxing, occurs primarily between 1,500–2,200 m. In the Wolong Nature Reserve, it occupies similar elevational zones and habitat types as in Baoxing, reaching elevations of up to 3,000 m.

==== 2.2.3. Phasianus colchicus strauchi (Strauch's grey-rumped pheasant) ====
Authority and original description: Przevalski, N. M. 1876.

Type locality: Tetung and Buhuk-gol, Kansu (= Gansu, north-central China).

Protonym and synonyms:

- Phasianus strauchi Przevalski, N. M. 1876 — protonym
- Phasianus holdereri Schalow, H. 1901 — junior synonym
- Phasianus berezowskyi Rothschild, L. W. 1901 — junior synonym
- Phasianus strauchi chonensis Ogilvie-Grant, W. R. 1912 — junior synonym

Local names: 雉鸡甘肃亚种 (Chinese: Gansu subspecies of Common Pheasant)

Description: This subspecies is highly variable, exhibiting a broad geographic cline across the Qilian-Datong, Qinling, and adjacent plateau-margin mountain systems, though it is generally a rather dark member of the grey-rumped pheasant group. The head is dark green with bluish reflections; the occiput is dark olive-green to copper-green with a faint violet gloss. Throughout most of its core range (eastern Qinghai, southern and western Gansu, southwestern Shaanxi, and northeastern Sichuan), white superciliary stripes and a white neck collar are usually absent, although occasional individuals show traces of white. Liu and Sun (1992), for example, recorded white superciliary markings in two of 23 males from the Datong River basin and a narrow white collar in one of 21 males in Lanzhou and one of 23 males from the Datong River basin. The hindneck and mantle range from golden-orange to buffy yellowish-brown, the feathers bearing triangular blackish-green apical wedges and incomplete dark-green margins. The mantle becomes noticeably paler through wear after the breeding season. The scapulars have whitish-buff centres freckled with black adjacent to the shaft, and broad chestnut to buffy-rufous margins; in fresh plumage the usually concealed portions of the feathers show extensive black-and-white patterning bordered by metallic violet. The rump is green in the centre with dark green transverse bands of varying widths; the sides of the rump are bluish-grey with a large vivid rust-coloured patch on each side of the upper tail-coverts. The central tail feathers are brownish-orange (sanford's brown) with broader black transverse bars in autumn, fading through wear to yellowish-grey (drab) with a little trace of brown and marked with narrower black bars by the following summer. Most rectrices have broad lilac-grey margins. The throat and neck are glossy green, often with a bluish sheen. This colouration extends variably onto the upper breast and is not sharply demarcated from the brownish-red lower breast, ranging from a narrow median wash to an extensive metallic green-blue suffusion. The lower breast and flanks are bright brownish-red to golden-brown, with feather margins showing a metallic green gloss. The lower breast is often suffused with golden-purple or coppery tones, particularly in fresh plumage. On the elongated flank feathers, this metallic terminal band often extends across the full width of the feather tip and may form a narrow border along the lateral margins; the sides of the breast are often paler and more buffy. The female resembles that of P. c. colchicus but is slightly darker and more heavily patterned, particularly on the underparts; the nape and mantle are faintly mottled with dark green rather than purple.

Pronounced clinal variation in the plumage and in the frequency of white markings occurs throughout the range. From the south and west towards the north-east, the proportion of males exhibiting white collars and white superciliary stripes increases progressively. Recorded frequencies of white collars and white superciliary stripes across specific local populations include: Datong river valley (n=23: 4.3%/8.7%), Lanzhou (n=21: 4.8%/0%), Lixian (n=15: 6.7%,0%), Minxian (n=17: 11.8%,0%), Minqin (P. c. sohokhotensis, n=5: 20%/20%), Longxi (n=26: 23.1%/15.4%), Tianshui (n=9: 22.2%/22.2%), Wushan (n=34: 23.5%/8.8%), Gangu (n=20: 25%/15%), Xiji (n=6: 33.3%/33.3%), Xi'an (n=6: 33.3%,0%), Zhouzhi (n=15: 40%,0%), Haiyuan (n=7: 42.9%/28.8%), Longde (n=7: 42.9%/42.9%), Shangxian (n=4: 50%,0%), Taibai (n=7: 71.4%/14.3%), Zhuanglang (n=8: 87.5%/50%), Huayin (n=3: 100%/66.7%), and Huating (n=9: 100%/77.8%). In specimens from the southern part of the range (Zoigê, Gannan, Longnan, and Zeku), the dark green colouration occupies approximately 50-67% of the chest; in some individuals it extends uninterruptedly to the black abdomen, approaching the condition seen in P. c. suehschanensis, although the upperparts are less richly coloured. The hindneck and mantle are golden-yellow, suffused with copper-red, and the lower back is chestnut-purple. In specimens from the northern and northeastern parts of the range (Tianshui, Xi'An, and the Liupanshan region), the dark green area usually occupies only 20-33% of the chest, and some birds lack dark green on the upper breast entirely. Towards the north, the lower back becomes progressively paler chestnut, while the hindneck and mantle become more purely golden-yellow and lose much of the copper-red suffusion. In the Minqin region (P. c. sohokhotensis), the golden colouration on the upper back is particularly intense. Whether these clines represent geographic variation within P. c. strauchi, gradual intergradation with neighbouring forms, or a combination of both remains unresolved. Populations from the Liupanshan and Longdong regions show especially strong development of (anteriorly interrupted) white collars and, in some areas, white superciliary stripes, and have been variously referred to P. c. torquatus, interpreted as hybrids between P. c. strauchi and P. c. torquatus, regarded as transitional to northern forms, or treated as an intermediate population between P. c. strauchi and P. c. kiangsuensis; their taxonomic position remains uncertain (see discussion under P. c. kiangsuensis: Birds on Longdong Loess Plateau and in the Guangzhong Plain).

Despite this extensive geographic variation, typical P. c. strauchi can generally be distinguished from neighbouring forms by the following combination of characters. P. c. strauchi differs from P. c. kiangsuensis in having bluish-grey lateral rump feathers that largely lack the green suffusion present in P. c. kiangsuensis, and dark brown undertail-coverts with chestnut tips rather than chestnut undertail-coverts marked with black. It differs from P. c. suehschanensis and P. c. decollatus in having narrow wedge-shaped blackish-green apical markings on the upper-back feathers rather than the large blackish-green apical blotches characteristic of those taxa. Compared with P. c. suehschanensis, the mantle and upper back are generally more golden-yellow and less chestnut-brown, whereas in P. c. decollatus they are even paler, being light brownish-yellow. The flank feathers of P. c. strauchi are typically copper-red, darker than the brown-yellow flanks of P. c. decollatus. Hybrids between P. c. strauchi (or P. c. suehschanensis) and P. c. decollatus, historically referred to as "berezowskyi"; occur across and south of Hui County (Longnan, Gansu). The upper back feathers of these birds bear large, blackish-green apical blotches resembling those of P. c. decollatus and P. c. suehschanensis, rather than the narrower wedge-shaped markings typical of P. c. strauchi. These hybrid birds further differ from typical P. c. strauchi in having a rich, shining, golden-brown breast sharply demarcated from the neck colour; chest feathers narrowly margined with steel-blue; whiter markings on the scapulars with reduced black vermiculation; broad buffy-rufous rather than chestnut margins; and a buffy yellowish-brown rather than fiery orange mantle; and paler buffy golden-brown flanks. The lower rump is more strongly suffused with blue, and the tail is whitish-grey rather than yellowish-grey, washed with rufous.

Photographs: Photographs are available from Qinghai, Gansu, and Shaanxi.

Measurements: Male wing length: Przevalski: 241–251 mm; Ogilvie-Grant: 239 mm; Beick: n = 8: 230–257 mm (mean 240.8 mm); Delacour: 240–250 mm; Vaurie: n = 10: 229–252 mm (mean 243.5 mm); Zheng: n = 10: 225–240 mm (mean 232.2 mm); Zheng: n = 10: 218–240 mm (mean 225 mm); Liu et al.: n = 20: 210–255 mm; Liu et al.: n = 29: 210–257 mm (mean 234.4 mm); Zheng: n = 7: 212–232 mm.

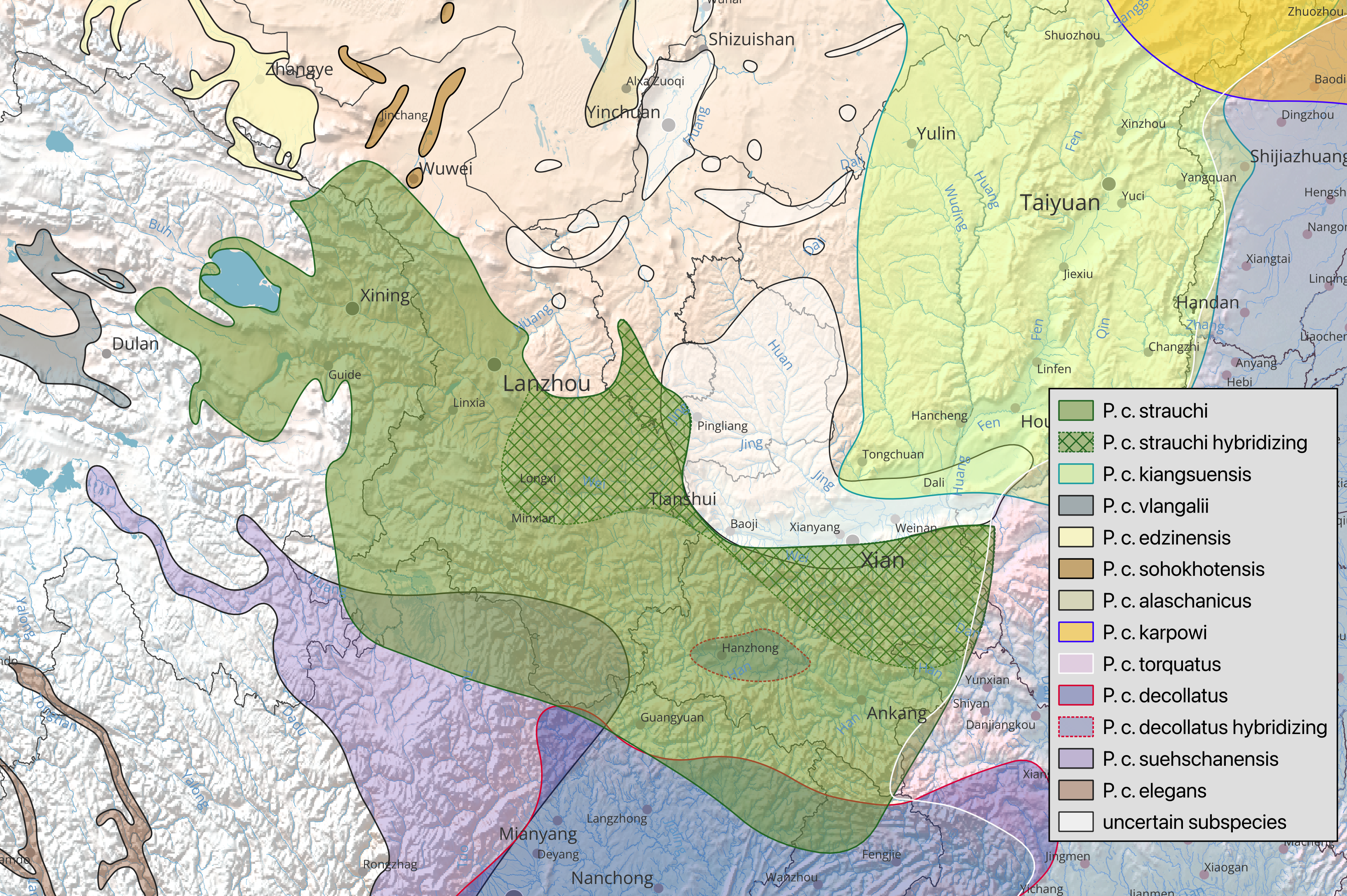
Distribution range of P. c. strauchi.

Distribution: Central China, including northeastern Sichuan, southern Shaanxi (central Qinling Mountains), eastern Qinghai (east and south of Qinghai Lake), and southern and central Gansu north to the Datong River. In Qinghai, the range extends west to Menyuan, Datong, Huangyuan, Gonghe, Guinan, Guide, and Zêkog, and includes the shores of Qinghai Lake. To the north, populations generally regarded as typical P. c. strauchi occur south of a line connecting Lenglongling, Xiyinghe (both in Sunan County), Bairi, Lanzhou, Yuzhong, Zhuoni, Zhouqu, Huixian, and Fengxian. The eastern limit lies approximately at Yangxian and Zhenba in Shaanxi, while the southern limit includes Maqu and Wenxian in Gansu and extends through Jiuzhaigou, Chengkou, Nanchong, Nanbu, Wanyuan, Guangyuan, Nanjiang, and Zoige in Sichuan. The subspecies also occurs in the Baishuijiang National Nature Reserve in Wenxian County, on the northern slopes of the Min Shan Range. Across a broad zone extending north to Dingxi, Tianshui, Zhouzhi, and Xi'an (and possibly farther north), east to Shangxian, and throughout the Liupanshan Mountains north to Haiyuan County, P. c. strauchi intergrades with a population of uncertain taxonomic identity. P. c. strauchi also occurs west of the Guanshan Mountains, the southern extension of the Liupanshan range in Gansu. In the Guanzhong Plain, P. c. torquatus may extend into the region from the east and P. c. kiangsuensis from the north, both potentially interacting with P. c. strauchi populations to the south. In the northern Liupanshan Mountains, the unidentified population may instead be related to pheasant populations occurring east of the Helan Shan. South of Qinghai Lake, P. c. strauchi approaches the range of P. c. vlangallii. Its relationships with P. c. sohokhotensis and P. c. edzinensis remain unclear. In the south, it intergrades with P. c. suehschanensis and with P. c. decollatus, and in the southeast, near the Henan border, possibly also with P. c. torquatus.

Habitat: This subspecies inhabits open woodland with shrubs and adjacent meadows in mountainous regions. It is most common at elevations of 1,000–1,500 m but may occur as high as 3,100 m. It is particularly abundant in river valleys, whereas it becomes scarce or disappears entirely in the upper reaches of rivers where woodland is sparse. It also occurs seasonally in agricultural landscapes. Along the Jing River in the loess region, Przevalsky found the pheasants numerous in dense thickets of saxaul (which here reached enormous sizes), tamarisk, and desert poplar. In the gorge of the Daheba River ("Baga-gorgi"), a left tributary of the Huang-He south of Qinghai Lake, he observed them in dense riverside thickets and forests dominated by tall willows (Salix sp.), sea-buckthorn (Hipophae rhamnoides), and, to a lesser extent, poplars (Populus simonii). The adjacent ravines supported dense shrub communities composed of caragana (Caragana frutescens), wild roses (Rosa sp.), cotoneaster (Cotoneaster sp.), barberry (Berberis sp.), meadowsweet (Spiraea sp.), sibiraea (Sibiraea sp.), honeysuckle (Lonicera sp.), and boxthorn (Lycium chinense). In the Baishuijiang National Nature Reserve, P. c. strauchi exhibits pronounced altitudinal migration. It winters in the foothills, moves upslope in March to breed in the mid-montane zone, and descends again in October or November.

==== 2.2.4. Phasianus colchicus sohokhotensis (Sohokhoto grey-rumped pheasant) ====
Authority and original description: Buturlin, S. A. 1908.

Type locality: Sohokhoto Oasis, southern Alashan (north-central China), ca. 100 km north of the eastern Nan Shan foothills.

Protonym and synonyms:

- Phasianus strauchi sohokhotensis Buturlin, S. A. 1908 — protonym

Local names: 雉鸡阿拉善亚种 (Chinese: Alashan subspecies of Common Pheasant)

Description: This subspecies generally resembles P. c. strauchi but is on average paler. According to Bianchi (who treated this subspecies as a variety of P. c. strauchi) and Buturlin, the most distinctive features are the stronger golden sheen of the upper back and the lighter, golden-rufous colouration of the sides of the breast and flanks, which are less intensely copper-red than in P. c. strauchi. The metallic black terminal bands on the elongated flank feathers usually occupy most, but not the entire width of the feather tip, whereas in typical P. c. strauchi they often extend across the full width and may even form a narrow border along the lateral margins of the feather. The crown is bronzy-brown. White superciliary stripes are usually absent, although Liu and Sun (1992) found traces of them in one out of five specimens from Minqin. The white neck collar is generally absent, vestigial, or narrow and interrupted anteriorly; Liu and Sun likewise recorded a collar in one out of five specimens from Minqin. The upper chest is dark green, whereas the remainder of the chest is dark copper-red with violet reflections. Liu et al. (1984), based on three adult males collected in the Tengger Desert near Minqin, confirmed the paler flanks, more golden upper back, and reduced extent of the black terminal flank markings noted in the original description. They additionally found the subspecies to be overall paler than P. c. strauchi, with broader and more conspicuous white "V"-shaped markings on the upper back and scapulars, a dark golden-brown breast with a purplish gloss rather than a coppery-red one, and narrower inverted anchor-shaped black markings at the feather tips. The female does not differ appreciably from that of P. c. strauchi. Delacour described P. c. sohokhotensis as possessing broad white superciliary stripes and a broad white collar, and stated that the dark flank markings were larger than in P. c. strauchi. These characters differ markedly from the original descriptions of Bianchi and Buturlin, which emphasised reduced black flank markings and made no mention of conspicuous white head or neck markings. Subsequent examinations of specimens from Minqin likewise failed to confirm Delacour's diagnosis. Because the taxon was originally described from very limited material, and because both its geographic variation and the extent of individual variation remain poorly documented, the validity and diagnostic limits of P. c. sohokhotensis have repeatedly been questioned and require further study.

Photographs: A photograph possibly representing this subspecies is available from Jinchuan Xiaxi (Yongchang County, Jinchang City).

Measurements: Male wing length: Liu et al.: 235–245 mm.

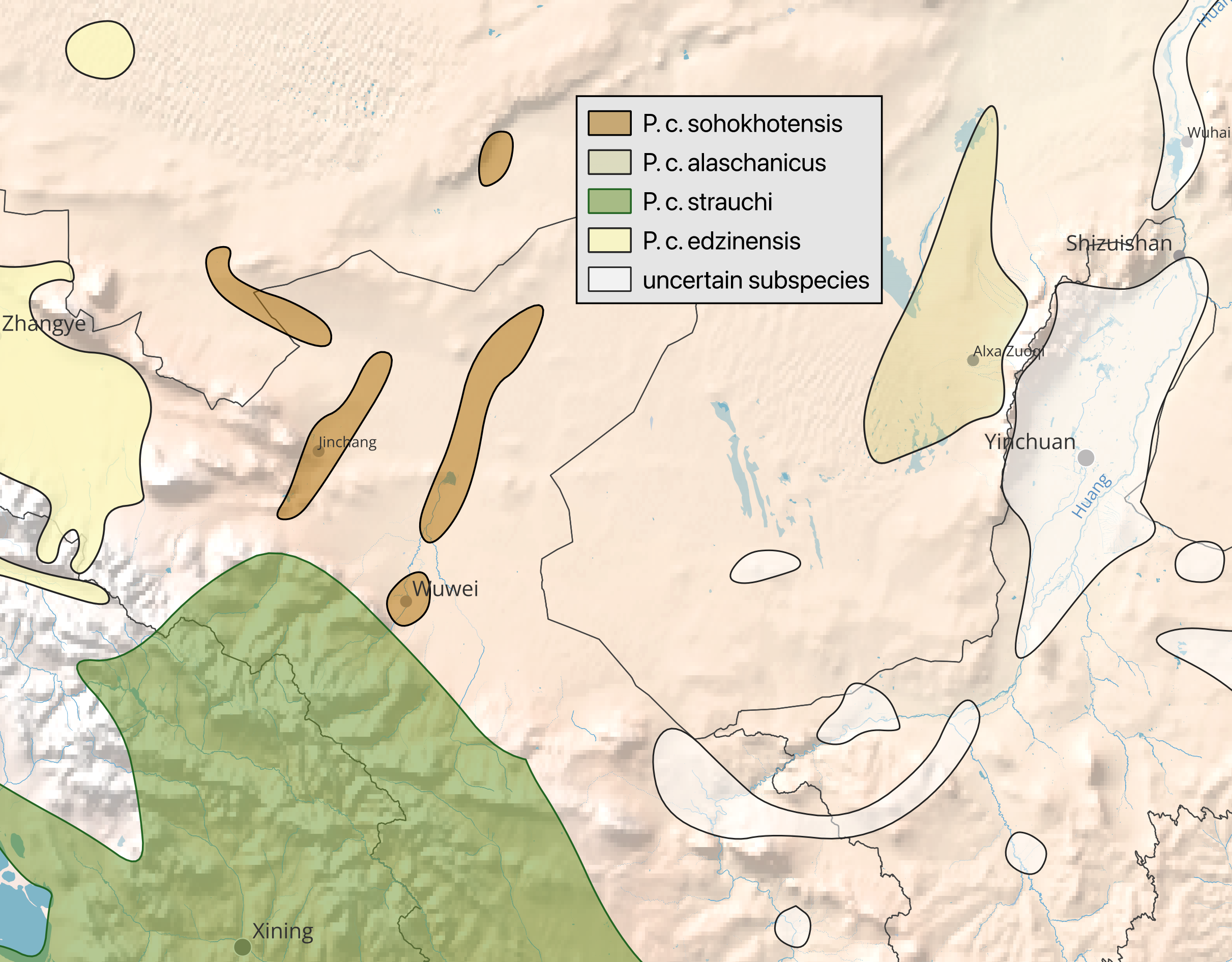
Distribution range of P. c. sohokhotensis.

Distribution: This subspecies is currently known only from the Sohokhoto Oasis (= Minqin Oasis), near Minqin between the Tengger and Badain Jaran deserts. The oasis lies north of the Liangzhou Oasis and forms the terminal oasis of the Shiyanghe river basin. By the late 20th century, environmental conditions in the Minqin oasis had deteriorated considerably, resulting in extensive desertification. Kozlov recorded pheasants attributable to P. c. sohokhotensis around 1900 on both the northwestern and southeastern margins of the oasis. The distribution of this subspecies outside the Minqin Oasis remains poorly known. It may also occur in other oasis systems of the Shiyang River basin, including Liangzhou, Yongchang, Jinchuan, and Babusha, but this has not been confirmed. It is conceivable that the subspecies occurs locally along the northern foothills of the Qilian Shan, where it may come into contact with P. c. strauchi, but no reliable data are currently available. The taxonomic identity of the pheasant populations inhabiting the Ningwei Plain Oasis remains unknown, as do the relationships between P. c. sohokhotensis and P. c. alaschanicus in Alxa Left Banner, and between P. c. sohokhotensis and P. c. edzinensis in the Heihe River basin.

Habitat: The subspecies inhabits oasis habitats within arid desert regions. The known localities lie at approximately 1,250 m above sea level. Kozlov observed the birds in January roosting during the evening in trees growing along irrigation ditches bordering cultivated fields. At night, they occupied the margins of remnant woodland, whereas during the day they sheltered in scattered shrubs near Chinese grave sites after feeding. On the eastern outskirts of Sokhohoto, pheasants were reportedly more numerous, apparently owing to the presence of extensive grazing lands supporting a mosaic of grassland, shrubland, and woodland vegetation.

Note: A 2013 mitochondrial DNA study recovered the Minqin population as a distinct lineage and supported the recognition of P. c. sohokhotensis, estimating divergence from P. c. strauchi at approximately 150,000–230,000 years ago.

==== 2.2.5. Phasianus colchicus satscheuensis (Satchu grey-rumped pheasant) ====
Authority and original description: Pleske, T. E. 1892.

Type locality: North of the Nan Shans.

Protonym and synonyms:

- Phasianus satscheuensis Pleske, T. E. 1892 — protonym

Local names: 雉鸡祁连山亚种 (Chinese: Qilian Shan subspecies of Common Pheasant)

Description: This subspecies is a pale and distinctive form, characterised by exceptionally light upperparts that give a markedly desert-adapted appearance. Pleske originally compared it with Amur pheasants referred to at the times as P. c. torquatus, which correspond to what is now recognised as P. c. pallasi. The crown is pale greenish-grey, and the white superciliary stripes are absent or only faintly indicated. The white neck collar is narrow and broadly interrupted across the foreneck, forming only about two-thirds of a complete ring. The upperparts are significantly pale and washed out, paler than in any other subspecies of the Common Pheasant. The broad margins of the scapulars range from pale sandy-brown to pale cinnamon-brown and may show a faint golden-red sheen in certain light conditions; on the scapulars nearest the wing they are glossy pale cinnamon, whereas those on the back are deeper wine-reddish cinnamon. The scapulars bear large creamy-white central patches, and the secondaries are extensively marbled, the pattern extending completely to the feather margins. The rump basic tone is mostly grey, and the upper wing-coverts are olive-sandy-grey or bluish-grey. The underparts remain relatively dark below, with the crop and chest coppery-red to copper-orange. The chest feathers are metallic copper-orange or rust-red and distinctly edged with velvety black or blackish-green, with these margins being broader and more complete than in P. c. torquatus or P. c. edzinensis, whereas in P. c. pallasi such black margins are lacking. The flanks are golden-yellow, while the feather margins of the lower underparts are predominantly greenish rather than pure blue, and the centre of the belly is reddish-brown. Compared with P. c. pallasi, this subspecies further differs in the paler sandy-brown scapular margins, the extensively marbled secondaries, the pale greyish-blue wing-coverts, and the dark rust-red feathers of the vent and lower flanks with a purplish sheen. The female is exceptionally pale, with a pale buff dorsal plumage with greatly reduced black markings. Her upperparts are even paler than in the female of P. c. shawii and P. c. tarimensis, while the neck feathers are conspicuously lively red-brown, and her paleness closely resembles that of P. c. vlangalii.

Photographs: Photographs are available from Dunhuang (Gansu): from Dunhuang Airport, and from Erdaoquan, Dunhuang (敦煌，二道泉).

Measurements: Male wing length: Hartert, Delacour: n = 5: 237–251 mm; Sushkin: 248–255 mm; Liu et al.: n = 3: 232–238 mm (mean 235.6 mm).

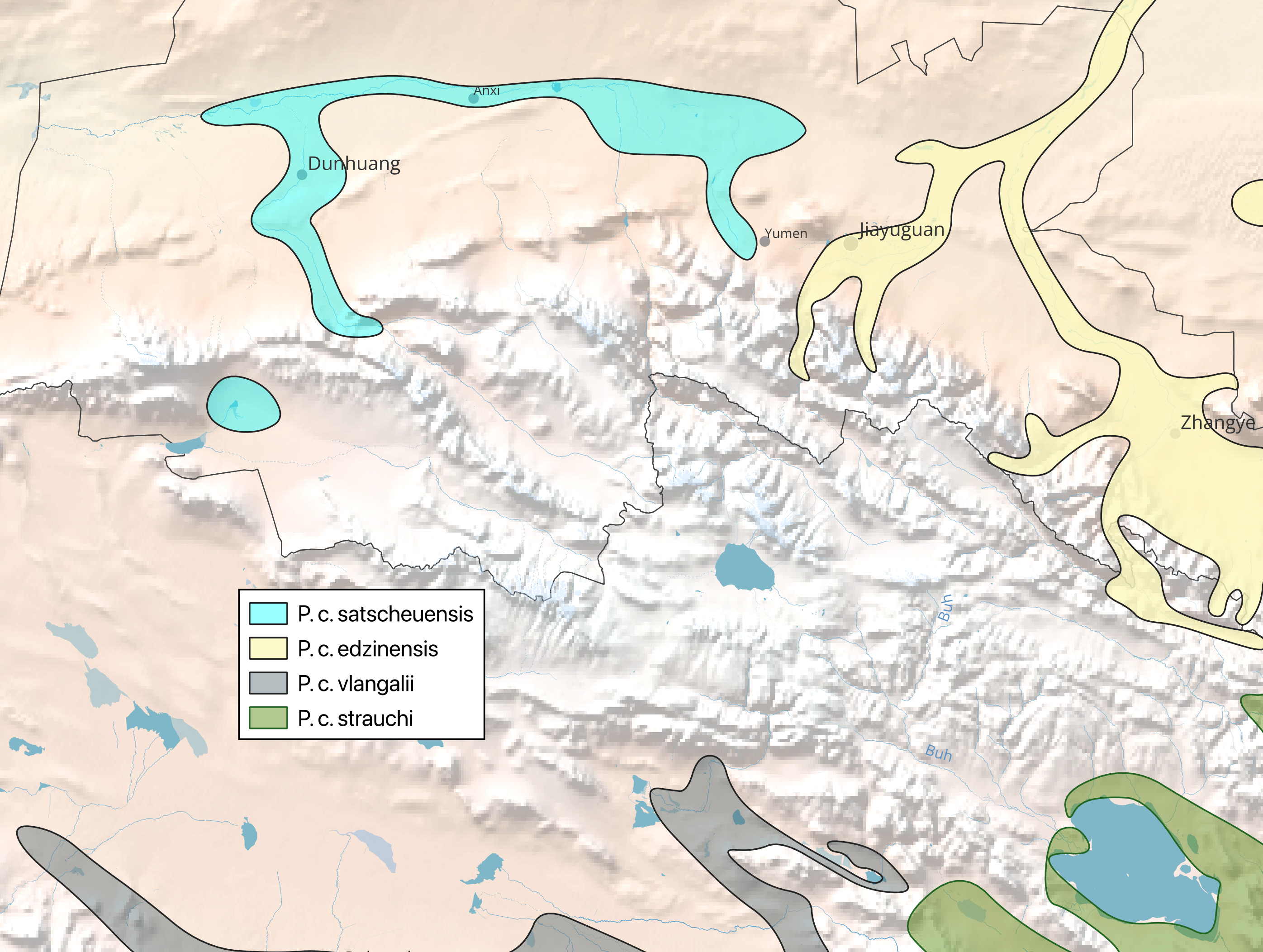
Distribution range of P. c. satscheuensis.

Distribution: This subspecies is restricted to northwestern Gansu, where it inhabits the oases and wetland habitats of the Shule River basin and the Dunhuang region north of the Nan-shan. During the expeditions of the Grum-Grzimailo brothers, it was recorded in considerable numbers in Guazhou (formerly Anxi, 瓜州), Xiaowan (小宛), Shuangtabao (双塔堡), Bulongji (布隆吉), Sidaogou (四道沟村), and Sidun (四墩). Historically, it was particularly common in the Dunhuang (Satchu) oasis and throughout the lower Shule River basin between Jiuquan (酒泉) and Lake Haraqi (Halachi, 哈拉湖, 40°29′N 94°21′E), formerly the terminal lake of the Shule River northwest of Dunhuang. The lake was dry for much of the period between 1960 and 2017. (This lake should not be confused with the larger Hara Lake in the Qaidam basin.) The Shule River basin was formerly a well-watered region supporting extensive riparian forests. From east to west, its principal watercourses include the Baiyang, Shiyou, Changma (the upper course of the Shule river), Yulin (Tashi), and Danghe rivers, all descending from the Nan Shan into the desert. According to Przevalski, the pheasant did not occur along the Danghe River; however, according to Hartert, citing Kozlov, it did. The present distribution of P. c. satscheuensis remains poorly documented, as much of its historical range has undergone severe desertification. Nevertheless, the subspecies continues to occur in the vicinity of Dunhuang. To the east it approaches the range of P. c. edzinensis in the Heihe River basin, and recent observations suggest that their ranges may overlap locally.

Habitat: The subspecies inhabits river valleys, marshes, oases, and lakeside wetlands at elevations of approximately 600–2,150 m above sea level. Near Sidun, the vegetation was reported to include species of Salsola, Salicornia, Karelinia, Sophora, Nitraria, Lycium, Alhagi, sedge (Carex), Lactuca, Limonium, Hedysarum, Artemisia, and Tanacetum.

==== 2.2.6. Phasianus colchicus edzinensis (Gobi grey-rumped pheasant) ====
Authority and original description: Sushkin, P. P. 1926.

Type locality: Lower Edzin-gol, central Gobi.

Protonym and synonyms:

- Phasianus colchicus edzinensis Sushkin, P. P. 1926 — protonym

Local names: 雉鸡弱水亚种 (Chinese: Ruo Shui subspecies of Common Pheasant)

Description: This subspecies closely resembles P. c. satscheuensis, but differs in its more contrasting scapular pattern and paler underparts. The crown is greenish-grey, and weak white vestigial or narrow superciliary stripes are present. The white neck collar is narrow and broadly interrupted on the foreneck. The margins of the scapulars and interscapulars are darker than in P. c. satscheuensis, varying from mikado-brown to fawn rather than being cinnamon or cinnamon-buff, and show a stronger fiery gloss. The centres of these feathers are pure white rather than creamy white. The chest is pale with little or no green gloss; the black metallic margins of the chest feathers are narrow and interrupted at the tips, whereas in P. c. satscheuensis they are broader and complete. The female closely resembles that of P. c. satscheuensis.

Photographs: Photographs are available from Heihe Wetland National Nature Reserve, Gansu.

Measurements: Male wing length: Sushkin: 240–250 mm; Zheng: n = 1: 220 mm.

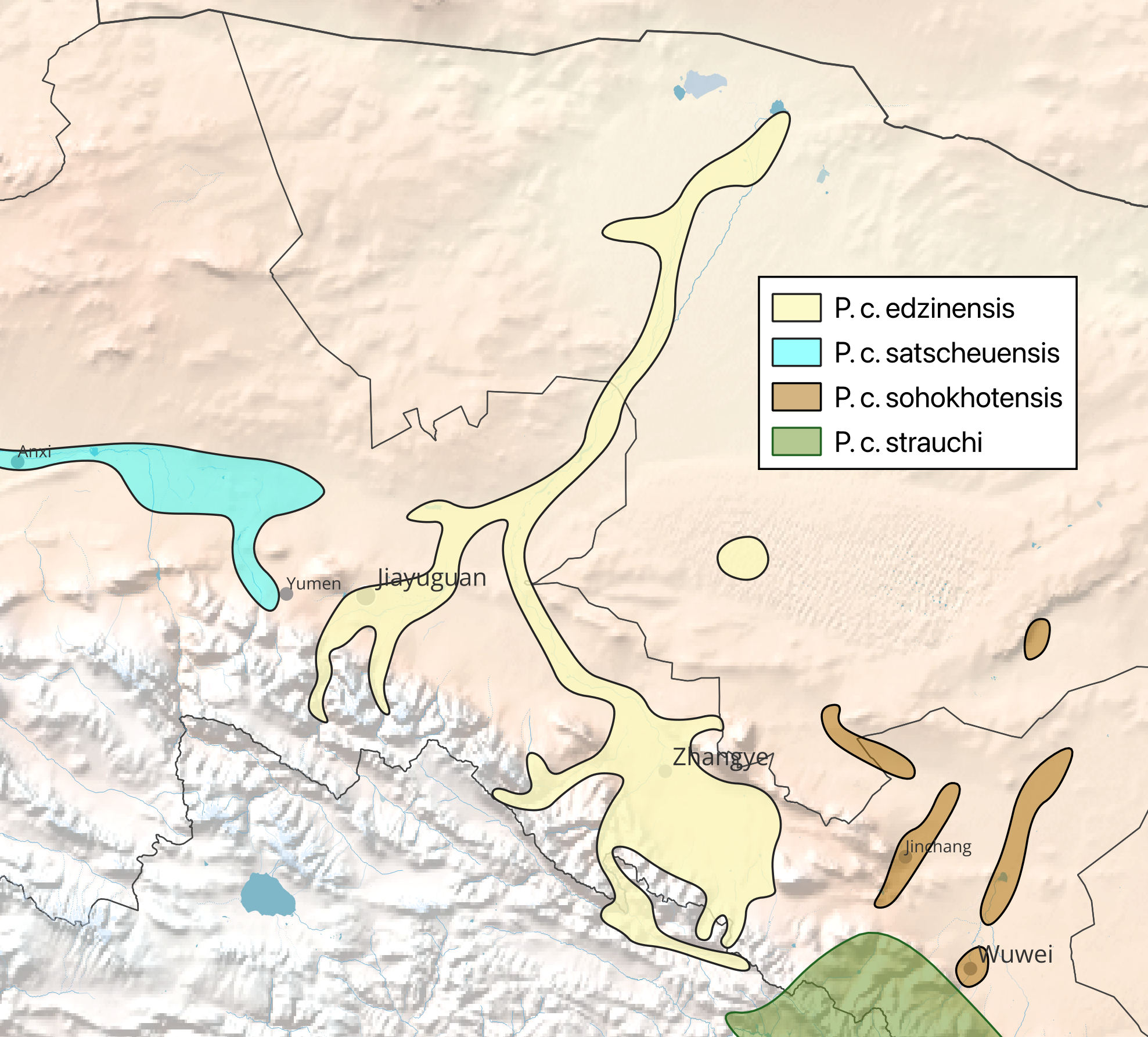
Distribution range of P. c. edzinensis.

Distribution: This subspecies inhabits the oases of the lower Ruo Shui (also known as the Ejin River, Edzin-Gol or Heihe River) in western Inner Mongolia, northern China. The Heihe drainage lies between the Shule River basin, inhabited by P. c. satscheuensis, and the Shiyang River Basin, inhabited by P. c. sohokhotensis, and extends northward to the China–Mongolia border region. Historically, P. c. edzinensis was common in the wetlands surrounding Juyan Lake. However, the lake dried up in 1961 and only began receiving water again after 2005. Pheasants currently occurring in the middle and lower reaches of the Heihe river system are generally assigned to P. c. edzinensis, but it remains unclear whether they represent the original Edzin Gol population, a southward displacement of that population following habitat loss in the Juyan basin, or birds that have historically interacted with neighbouring P. c. satscheuensis. The relationships of P. c. edzinensis with P. c. satscheuensis to the west and with P. c. sohokhotensis and P. c. alaschanicus to the east remain poorly understood.

Habitat: The subspecies inhabits river valleys, marshes, oases, and lakeside wetlands. Kozlov described the Edzin Gol valley as supporting riparian woodlands dominated by three principal tree species: desert poplar (Populus euphratica), oleaster (Elaeagnus), and willow (Salix). Along the margins of the valley occurred extensive stands of tamarisk (Tamarix), nitrebush (Nitraria schoberi), box-thorn (Lycium ruthenicum), dogbane (Apocynum pictum), Zygophyllum brachypterum and camel thorn (Alhagi maurorum). Historically, the banks of the Edzin Gol were covered by dense, nearly impenetrable woodland and scrub, much of which was later cleared for pasture.

==== 2.2.7. Phasianus colchicus alaschanicus (Helan Shan grey-rumped pheasant) ====
Authority and original description: Alferaki, S. N.; Bianchi, V. L. 1908.

Type locality: Western foothills of the Ala-Shans (=Helan Shan).

Protonym and synonyms:

- Phasianus alaschanicus Alferaki, S. N.; Bianchi, V. L. 1908 — protonym

Local names: 雉鸡贺兰山亚种 (Chinese: Helan Shan subspecies of Common Pheasant)

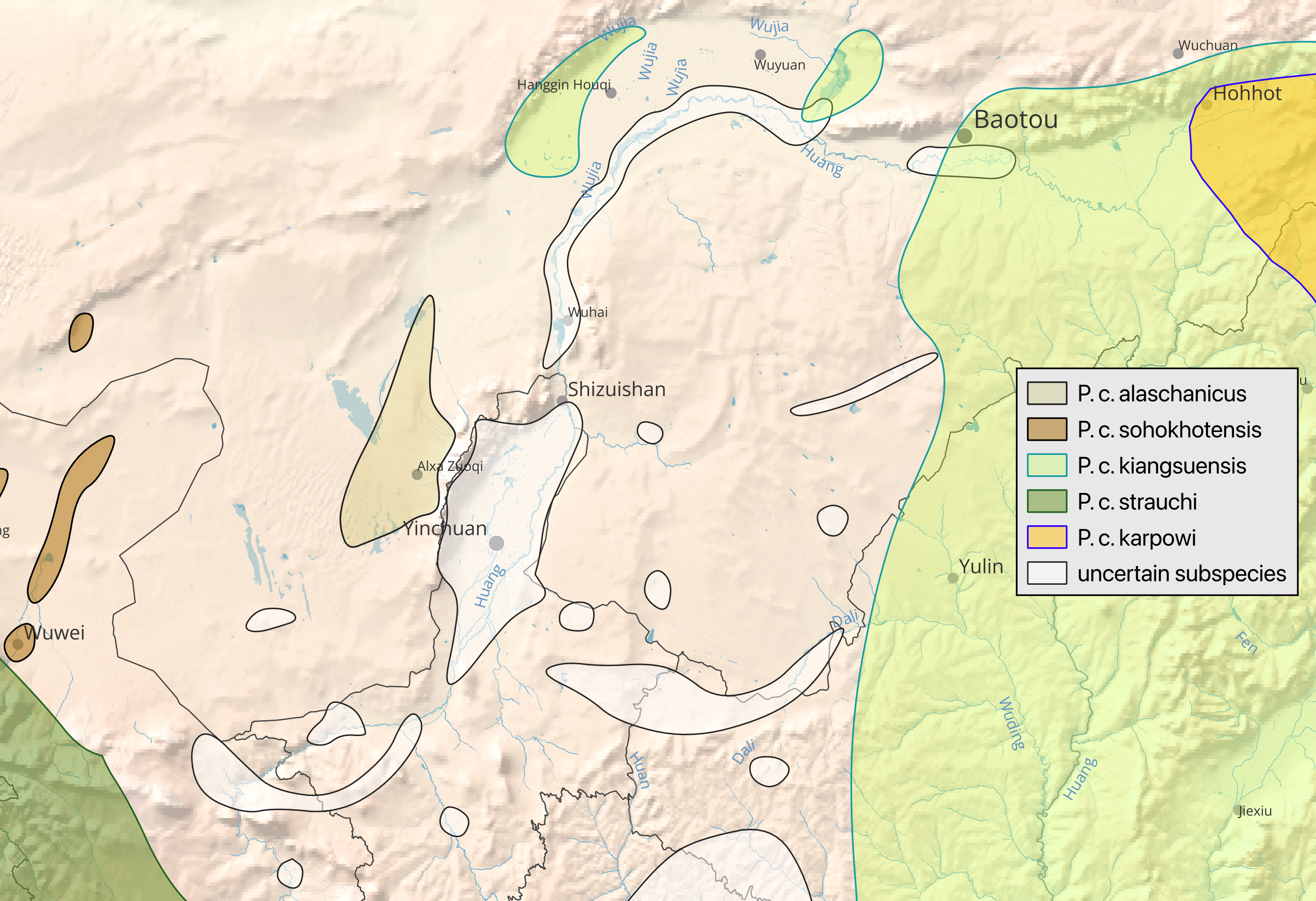
Distribution range of P. c. alaschanicus.

Description: This subspecies is paler than P. c. kiangsuensis, typically showing narrow white superciliary stripes that are narrower than the diameter of the eye, or at least traces of them, together with a narrow white collar extending around the nape and sides of the neck but remaining open across the anterior third of the neck. The crown is copper-green or bronzy-brown. The extreme upper part of the chest is dark green, the lower chest and central breast mostly coppery-red tinged with purple, with all feathers broadly margined with black. The forward portion of the interscapular region is golden-yellow decorated with triangular metallic-blue or green apical spots, while the upper back shows obvious glossy black apical shaft-streaks or wedges. The scapulars and tertials are dark chestnut or maroon, contrasting sharply with the brilliant red-gold or golden-flame upper back. The upper wing-coverts are bluish-grey or glaucescent-ashy, the posterior upper tail-coverts are glaucescent-greenish, and the pale golden-yellow flank feathers bear metallic-blue apical spots. In P. c. satscheuensis, by contrast, the scapulars and tertials are sandy-brown and pass gradually into the golden-yellow colouration of the upper back with very weak contrast. The female of P. c. alaschanicus resembles that of P. c. strauchi. The distinction between P. c. alaschanicus and P. c. kiangsuensis remains unclear. According to Riley, P. c. alaschanicus resembles P. c. kiangsuensis from Shaanxi, but differs in having the mantle and flanks yellow-ochre to pale-ochre rather than fiery cinnamon-rufous, and in possessing much narrower red margins on the scapulars. In light of the variation documented in P. c. strauchi, the presence or absence of a white collar and superciliary stripes does not appear to constitute a clear-cut subspecific character. Additional material is needed to assess the consistency and taxonomic significance of these traits. Together with P. c. sohokhotensis, P. c. alaschanicus remains one of the least well-known and most poorly documented subspecies.

Photographs: No photographs that can be assigned confidently to this subspecies are currently available.

Measurements: Male wing length: Xing et al.: n = 1: 245 mm.

Distribution: This subspecies has been recorded from desert oases of the Alxa Left Banner region in north-central China, particularly near the western foothills of the Helan Shan in south-central Inner Mongolia and adjacent Ningxia. The taxonomic identity of the pheasants inhabiting the Helan Shan and the oases east of the range, including the Yinchuan Plain, remains uncertain. Likewise, it is unknown whether pheasants occur in the desert oases of Alxa Right Banner (which lies west of Alxa Left Banner, reflecting the traditional Chinese directional convention), and, if present, to which subspecies they belong. The relationships and possible contact zones among P. c. edzinensis, P. c. sohokhotensis, and P. c. alaschanicus across the Alxa region remain inadequately documented. It is conceivable that the pheasant populations inhabiting the Ningwei, Yinchuan, and Houtao plain oases are related to P. c. alaschanicus. The Houtao oasis occupies the great bend of the Yellow River and is bordered by Lang Shan to the north, the Yinchuan Plain Oasis to the south, the Ulan Buh Desert to the southwest, and Baotou to the east. However, available evidence is insufficient to evaluate these potential relationships.

Habitat: This subspecies inhabits oasis habitats embedded within arid and semi-arid desert landscapes.

==== 2.2.8. Phasianus colchicus kiangsuensis (Shansi grey-rumped pheasant) ====
Authority and original description: Buturlin, S. A. 1904.

Type locality: Eastern China (erroneous). The type specimen was probably brought from Kalgan (Zhangjiakou) and most likely originated in the mountainous areas of northwestern Hebei and northern Shanxi. As Buturlin himself noted, "kiangsuensis" is a misnomer, as this subspecies does not occur in Jiangsu (=Kiangsu).

Protonym and synonyms:

- Phasianus holdereri kiangsuensis Buturlin, S. A. 1904 — protonym
- Phasianus schensinensis Buturlin, S. A. 1905 — junior synonym
- Phasianus gmelini pewzowi Alferaki, S. N.; Bianchi, V. L. 1908 — junior synonym

Local names: 雉鸡内蒙亚种 (Chinese: Inner Mongolia subspecies of Common Pheasant)

Description: This subspecies shows a significant divergence across its range, having been described in at least two primary plumage phenotypes. In the pale morph, the crown is brassy-yellow, the mantle and flanks are golden-yellow, the flanks sparsely spotted with black and the overall plumage is paler and more washed-out than that of P. c. karpowi, with the breast displaying a dull reddish-brown to brownish-yellow hue that lacks purple iridescence. Conversely, in the dark morph, the plumage is darker and more richly coloured than P. c. karpowi, the crown is dark greenish-olive, the mantle and flanks are a rich golden-orange or fiery cinnamon rufous, the flanks with wide dark metallic blue apical spots, and the scapular margins are deep reddish-brown with a purple shimmer. The dark morph breast is further characterized as reddish copper-yellow or coppery-red with highly suppressed, very narrow, or nearly obsolete borders. Variability is high, and some individuals show a light olive-green crown with bronze gloss and a highly shiny metallic green nape that is scarcely differentiated from the neck, and barely noticeable or completely wanting eyebrows. Stable diagnostic characters across typical populations include a narrow white superciliary stripe that is narrow and inconspicuous, and a narrow white neck collar that is usually complete but tapers or is slightly open across the front throat. The breast universally lacks the green sheen of P. c. strauchi, and the rump background tone is mostly grey or olive-blue. The female is sandy-brown with a densely spotted dorsal side.

Note: Distinguishing this subspecies from P. c. karpowi and P. c. torquatus, and especially from P. c. alaschanicus, can be difficult. In addition, northern populations of P. c. strauchi intergrade with an as yet unidentified form characterised by white supercilium stripes and a white collar, while the identity of the pheasant populations inhabiting the western Ordos plateau and the Loess plateau east of the Liupan mountains remains uncertain. The situation is further complicated by the apparent introduction of P. c. torquatus into parts of the range of P. c. kiangsuensis, and by the substantial range expansion of P. c. karpowi following agricultural development in formerly arid regions. As a result, populations referable to P. c. karpowi and P. c. kiangsuensis now occur sympatrically over a considerable area. The subspecific identity of populations between Baotou and Bayannur, and southward to Wuhai and Yinchuan, as well as their relationships and possible zones of intergradation, remains to be clarified.

Photographs: Photographs are available from Yungcheng Salt Lake (Shanxi), from Yangquan City (Shanxi), and from Taiyue Shan National Forest Park (Shanxi).

Measurements: Male wing length: Delacour: 240–255 mm; Zheng: n = 10: 223–242 mm (mean 233.0 mm); Zheng: n = 10: 220–235 mm (mean 226.5 mm); Liu et al.: n = 14: 225–245 mm (mean 234.7 mm).

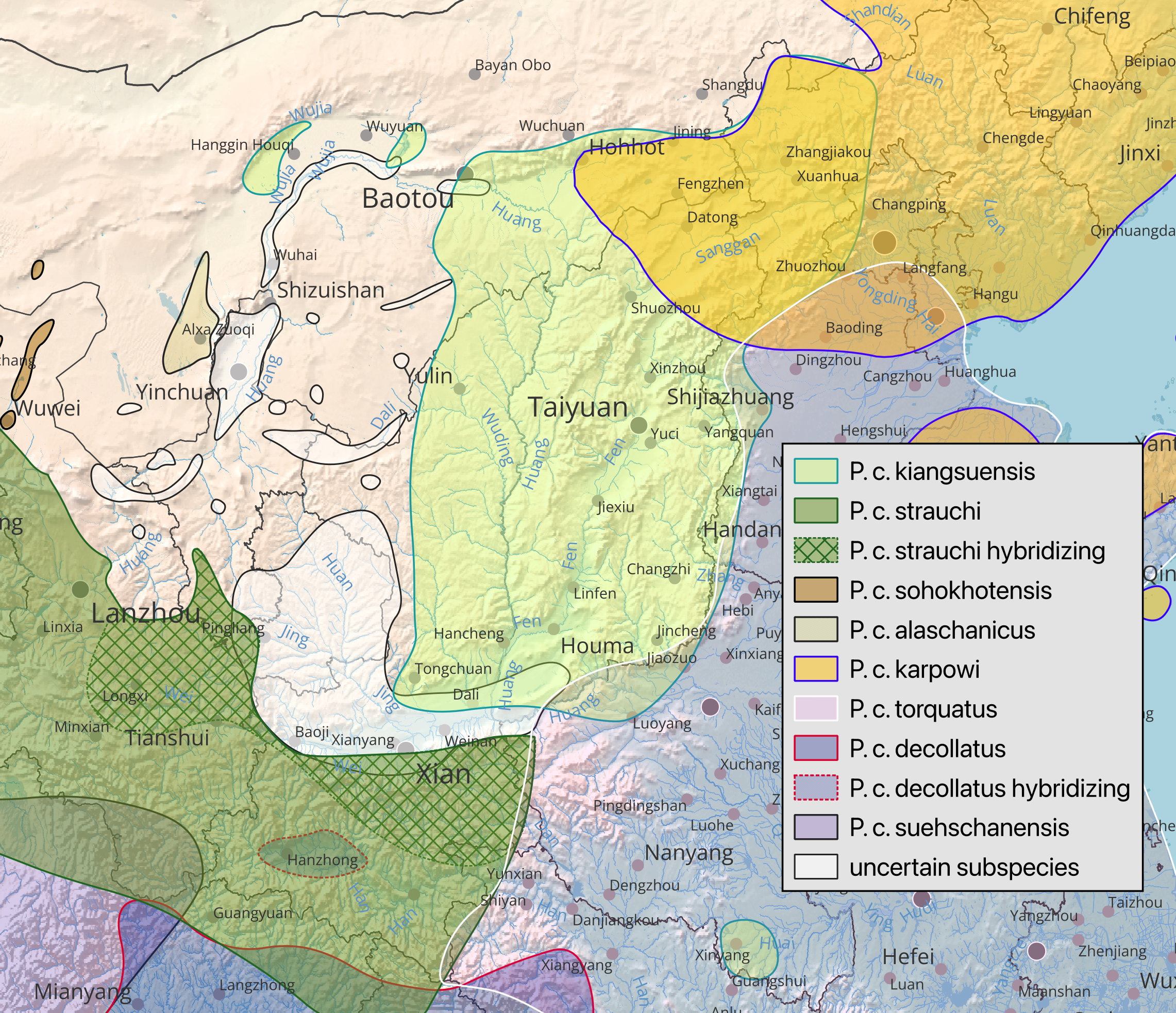
Distribution range of P. c. kiangsuensis.

Distribution: The range includes western Hebei, the mountainous western fringes of Beijing, all of Shanxi, western parts of northern and central Shaanxi, and central Inner Mongolia. In northeastern China, it inhabits the Lüliang and Taihang ranges, extending into the northeastern Ordos desert and adjacent southeastern Inner Mongolia, and westward to the Wuliangsuhai wetlands. To the east, it reaches the mountain ranges north and west of Beijing, where it intergrades with P. c. karpowi. In Hebei, P. c. kiangsuensis populates the Taihang mountains in the west, whereas P. c. karpowi inhabits the Yanshan Mountains in the north. Pheasants occurring in Beijing are generally assigned to P. c. karpowi, while P. c. torquatus occurs in the Hebei plain in southeastern Hebei south of Beijing. In Inner Mongolia, P. c. kiangsuensis is distributed along the Yinshan Mountains and the adjacent piedmont shrublands. In Shaanxi, P. c. kiangsuensis was reported during surveys conducted between 1956 and 1963 from the Loess Plateau, including Tongchuan, Huangling, Luochuan, Ganquan, Yan'an, Nanniwan, Zichang, and Suide, as well as from the Ordos Plateau in Dingbian and Yichuan. However, later studies reported pheasants identified as "P. c. torquatus" from Ningxia and from the foothills of the Liupan Mountains. In the Mu Us Desert region of northern Shaanxi, P. c. kiangsuensis was recorded in the eastern part, around Shenmu, whereas birds identified as "P. c. torquatus" were reported from the western part, around Dingbian. Pheasants identified as "P. c. torquatus" have also been reported from the eastern side of the Guanshan Mountains, a southern branch of the Liupan Range. The taxonomic identity of many of these western populations remains uncertain and requires further study.

Birds on Longdong Loess Plateau and in the Guangzhong Plain: In a 1984 publication, specimens from the Qingyang region (Huachi, Heshui, Ningxian) and the Pingliang region (Zhuanglang, Huating) of the Longdong Loess Plateau, including 10 adult males, were described as follows: "Unlike strauchi, these birds had golden upper backs, dark green lower backs and rumps, and yellowish-brown central rump feathers. The upper breast lacks dark green, appearing pale reddish-copper, similar in colour to the lower breast. The feather margins bear broad anchor-shaped black markings. The flank feathers are pale golden-yellow, with large, "m"-shaped black terminal markings. All males possess a white neck ring, slightly interrupted at the foreneck. They resemble the East China subspecies [P. c. torquatus], but lack a white supercilium. Unlike P. c. kiangsuensis, which occurs in northern Shaanxi, they possess an interrupted neck ring and lack a white supercilium.". However, in a 1992 publication, specimens from Huating, Heshui, and Ningxian collected between 1963 and 1983 were re-discussed, and it was stated that "males show 100% occurrence of white eyebrow stripes and white collars; the collar is interrupted at the front of the neck; the upper back is golden yellow with some chestnut; the breast is pale reddish-copper and lacks dark green; the flanks are golden yellow with large, "m"-shaped black markings at the feather tips". This description directly contradicts the 1984 account regarding the presence of white superciliary stripes. A further study published in 1992 reported that all nine specimens from Huating possessed a white collar and seven showed a white supercilium, whereas among eight specimens from Zhuanglang, seven possessed a white collar and four a white supercilium. The taxonomic identity of these populations therefore remains uncertain. Their characters warrant comparison not only with P. c. torquatus but also with P. c. alaschanicus and P. c. kiangsuensis, all of which may exhibit white superciliary stripes. In the Guangzhong Plain east of the Longdong Plateau, P. c. torquatus may extend westward from eastern China, while P. c. kiangsuensis may extend southward from northern Shaanxi and Shanxi, both potentially interacting with P. c. strauchi. Among the three specimens from Huayin, all possessed a white collar, and two showed white superciliary stripes. In Xi'an, two of six specimens possessed a white collar, and none showed white superciliary stripes; in Zhouzhi, six of fifteen specimens possessed a white collar, and none showed white superciliary stripes.

Birds on Western Ordos Plateau and in the Hetao Plain: The subspecific identity of pheasants occurring east of the Helan Shan and along the Yellow River valley north of Yinchuan remains unclear and may involve multiple taxa, including P. c. kiangsuensis. Birds from the Wuliangsu Lake region appear to represent a heterogeneous assemblage showing characters of P. c. kiangsuensis, P. c. karpowi, and possibly an additional, as yet unidentified form. The unidentified form reportedly possesses white superciliary stripes and a narrow white collar interrupted on the foreneck. Some birds show thin, inconspicuous superciliary stripes; a pale green crown; a pale golden back with black shaft streaks; scapulars broadly edged purplish-chestnut; a copper-orange breast with a metallic sheen and narrowly black-edged feathers; and orange-yellow flanks with large black terminal spots. Additional birds show a well-developed supercilium, a copper-green crown, a brownish-yellow back with black shaft streaks, and a hazel-coloured breast with a purplish sheen and black feather margins. These populations may involve influences from P. c. edzinensis and P. c. alaschanicus, although their precise taxonomic status remains unresolved. Likewise, pheasants occurring south of the Helan Shan, around Zhongwei, appear to belong to an unidentified population that may show affinities to P. c. sohokhotensis or P. c. alaschanicus. The pheasants inhabiting the Liupan mountains of Ningxia (Longde, Xiji, Haiyuan) appear to represent an intergrade population between P. c. strauchi and this unidentified form. In addition, recent observations suggest that P. c. kiangsuensis is entering the Ordos Plateau from the east along transport corridors.

Habitat: The subspecies occupies a wide range of habitats, including mountain scrub, grasslands at forest edges, reedbeds along rivers and lakes, and hilly areas adjacent to farmland. In Shanxi, the subspecies occurs at elevations of approximately 350 to 2,800 m above sea level.

=== 2.3. Torquatus group (Eastern Grey-rumped Pheasants) ===
This group is widely distributed across eastern China, extending south to northernmost Vietnam and north to the Strait of Tartary region, with an isolated population in north-western Mongolia. It is notably absent from Hainan. Most pheasants introduced into North America belong to this group. In males, the crown is characterised by bronze rather than copper-green tones, and ranges from dark green without orbital lines, as in P. c. decollatus, to pale bronze-brown or pale bronzy chromium-green framed with white orbital lines in the northern forms. The white neck ring varies from broad and conspicuous in the north-east, as in P. c. pallasi, to absent in the south-west, as in P. c. decollatus. The wing-coverts range from tan to light grey and may appear almost white in some individuals. The mantle and flanks typically exhibit a rather sharp and contrasting transition from straw-yellow, ochre-yellow, or golden yellow to the richer colouration of chest and breast. The lower back, rump, and upper tail-coverts are greyish-bluish-olive, with a transverse pattern on the lower back. The chest varies from copper-red to pale brownish-red; in P. c. decollatus it is rich purple-red, and it exhibits broad black feather margins, a feature shared with P. c. hagenbecki. Black apical markings on the flank feathers are restricted to the central portion of the feather tips and never expand into full apical bands across the entire feather width, unlike in the western grey-rumped pheasants. The belly is matt black. The tail feathers are olive, with reddish feather margins and broad dark transverse bands. Females are dark and resemble those of the Caucasian group, although they are somewhat paler. The back bears black spots with reddish and ochre margins, while the streaked patterning of the feather edges is weakly developed. The underparts are light sandy-ochre with faint dark streaking. Average wing length in males is smallest in P. c. decollatus (~235 mm), similar among P. c. karpowi, P. c. torquatus, and P. c. takatsukasae (~239 mm), considerably larger in P. c. pallasi (~247 mm), and largest – by a considerable margin – in P. c. hagenbecki (~261 mm), which is the largest of all subspecies of P. colchicus. The inclusion of P. c. hagenbecki within the Torquatus group has been questioned.

==== 2.3.1. Phasianus colchicus hagenbecki (Kobdo grey-rumped pheasant) ====
Authority and original description: Rothschild, L. W. 1901.

Type locality: Kobdo Valley, Mongolia.

Protonym and synonyms:

- Phasianus hagenbecki Rothschild, L. W. 1901 — protonym

Local names: Зэрлэг гургуул (Mongolian: Wild Pheasant), 雉鸡科布多亚种 (Chinese: Kobdo subspecies of Common Pheasant), Кобдинский фазан (Russian: Kobdo Pheasant)

Description: This subspecies is the largest known subspecies of the Common Pheasant and one of the palest members of the traditionally recognised Torquatus group. It is characterised by a very broad, complete white neck collar, usually wider anteriorly than posteriorly, and attaining its maximum width on the sides of the neck, broad white superciliary stripes, a pale chromium-green or greyish-green crown (sometimes with a bronze tinge), and a generally straw-yellow ground colour to the body plumage. The scapulars are pale rufous buff. The feathers of the lower back and upper rump have a creamy-white ground colour, with two green sub-terminal transverse bands and two smoky-black bars on the concealed central portion of each feather, giving the lower back and rump a distinctly mottled appearance. The wing-coverts are blue-grey. It closely resembles P. c. pallasi, but generally lacks the white patch below the ear-coverts, which is present in only about 10% of individuals. In addition, the black margins of the breast feathers are considerably broader, forming a continuous reticulate pattern, and the neck collar is typically even broader than in P. c. pallasi. Females resemble those of P. c. pallasi but are rather paler and redder, exhibiting a brighter, more reddish-orange plumage than the nominate form P. c. colchicus.

Photographs: Photographs are available from Hovd Province (WWF Mongolia), from Har-Us (Hovd), and from smaller islands on the Khovd River.

Measurements: Male wing length: Rothschild: 260 mm; Delacour: 260–265 mm; Vaurie: n = 4: 250–270 mm (mean 260 mm).

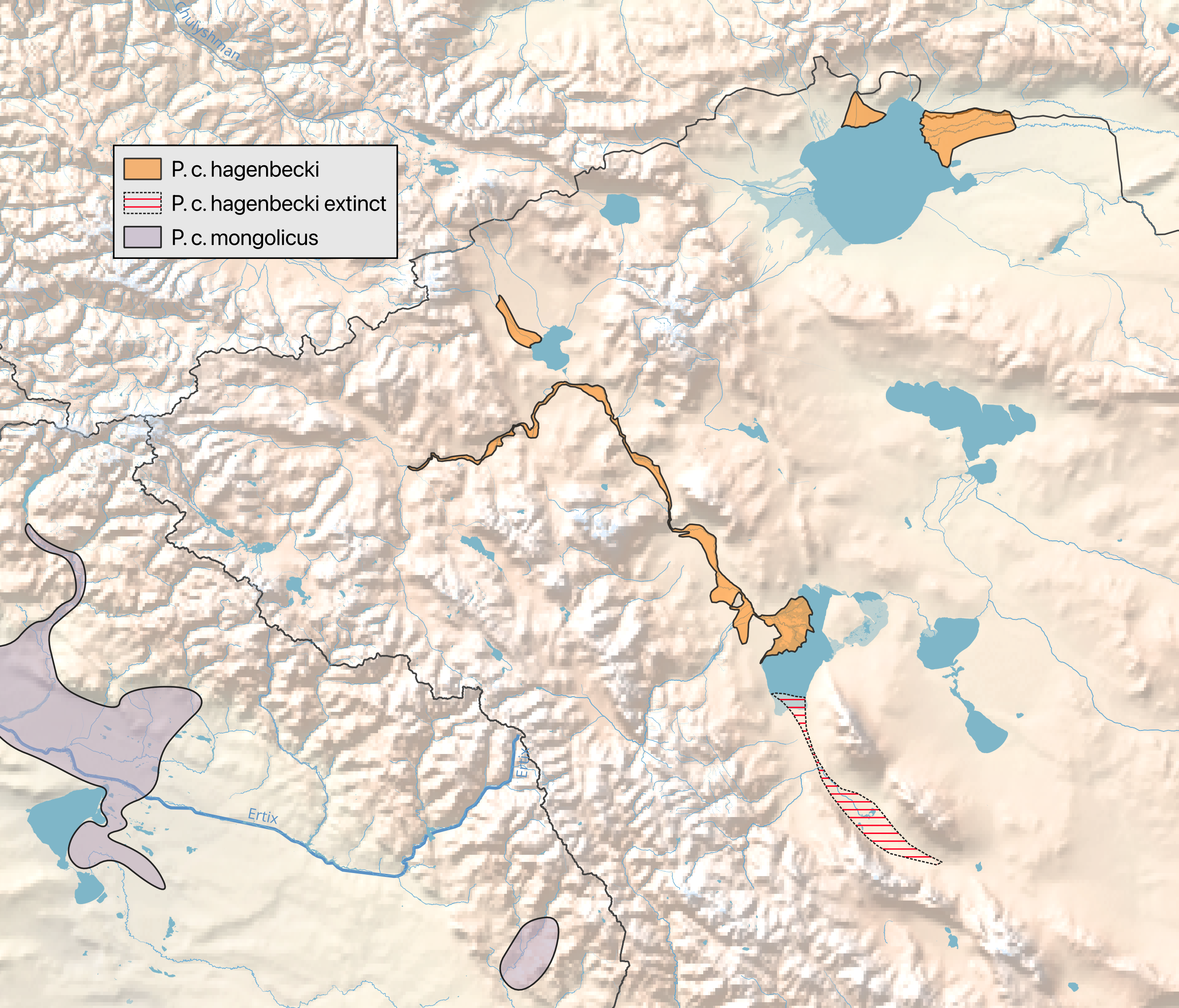
Distribution range of P. c. hagenbecki.

Distribution: This subspecies is isolated in the northern Gobi Altai of western Mongolia. Its current distribution extends from Khar-Us Lake (Khar-Us Nuur) along the Kobdo River (Khovd Gol) valley to Achit Lake (Achit Nuur). Historically, its range encompassed much of the Khovd River basin, extending from approximately the mouth of the Sagsay River west of Uujim, through the vicinity of Ölgii southward to the reed beds of Khar-Us Lake and the birch groves of the Zereg depression (Zereg sum). It also occurred in the delta of the Böhmörön River south of Baishint, north of Achit Lake, as well as in the deltas of the Tes and Torkholig (Torgalyk) rivers east and north of Uvs Lake, respectively. According to Sushkin, the subspecies was never recorded in the Üüreg Lake basin and was also notably absent from all tributaries of the Khovd River. It has since disappeared from much of its former range. Since the 1990s, the principal population in the Khovd River basin has declined markedly, while the continued presence of pheasants in the lower Böhmörön remains unconfirmed. Only small, fragmented populations are known to persist, including at the foothills of Tsambaragav in Erdeneburen, in Nariin Gol Bag between Khar-Us Lake and Khovd (1,185 m), and on small islands within the Khovd River.

Habitat: The Khovd River basin lies within an arid steppe zone. The subspecies inhabits riparian habitats characterised by sandy soils, willow stands, birch groves, mixed birch-poplar woodland, thickets of Caragana and sea-buckthorn, and extensive reedbeds. It is most commonly associated with dense shrub vegetation on the numerous islands of the Khovd River and with reed and sedge beds along the shore of Achit Lake. In the Böhmörön delta, Sushkin reported pheasants inhabiting dense thickets composed of low yellow birch (Betula microphylla), tall willows, and sea-buckthorn (Hippophae rhamnoides), interspersed with meadow openings dominated by tall grasses. These habitats were locally marshy and hummocky, with patches of saltmarsh and bare sand, and were dissected by numerous channels of the Böhmörön River. Pheasants occupied the densest portions of these thickets and were frequently encountered in areas inhabited by wild boar. The subspecies generally occurs at elevations between 900 and 1,500 m but may ascend to approximately 1,700 m.

==== 2.3.2. Phasianus colchicus pallasi (Pallas's Grey-rumped pheasant) ====
Authority and original description: Rothschild, L. W. 1903.

Type locality: Restricted type locality, lower Sidemi (= Narva) River.

Protonym and synonyms:

- Phasianus torquatus pallasi Rothschild, L. W. 1903 — protonym
- Phasianus torquatus mongolicus Rothschild, L. W. 1901 — junior synonym
- Phasianus alpherakyi Buturlin, S. A. 1904 — junior synonym
- Phasianus alpherakyi ussuriensis Buturlin, S. A. 1904 — junior synonym

Note: Pallas (1831) provided the earliest account of a pheasant form corresponding to a population later treated as P. c. pallasi, referring to it descriptively as "varietas mongolica", but without formally establishing a subspecific name. In 1844, Brandt subsequently established P. mongolicus for the Kyrgyz pheasant. Because Pallas had earlier used the epithet mongolicus in a descriptive sense, Rothschild (1901) initially considered the name preoccupied and proposed P. brandti for Brandt's taxon, providing a description of Pallas' birds as P. torquatus mongolicus. He later (1903) concluded that Pallas had not validly established a competing name, rendering brandti a junior synonym of mongolicus, and introduced P. torquatus pallasi for Pallas' form. Ironically, the name mongolicus is now applied to a form that does not occur in Mongolia, whereas pallasi does occur there.

Local names: Маньчжурский фазан (Russian: Manchurian Pheasant), Уссурийский фазан (Russian: Ussuri Pheasant), 雉鸡东北亚种 (Chinese: Northeast subspecies of Common Pheasant), 북꿩 (Korean: Northern Pheasant), 만주꿩 (Korean: Manchurian Pheasant)

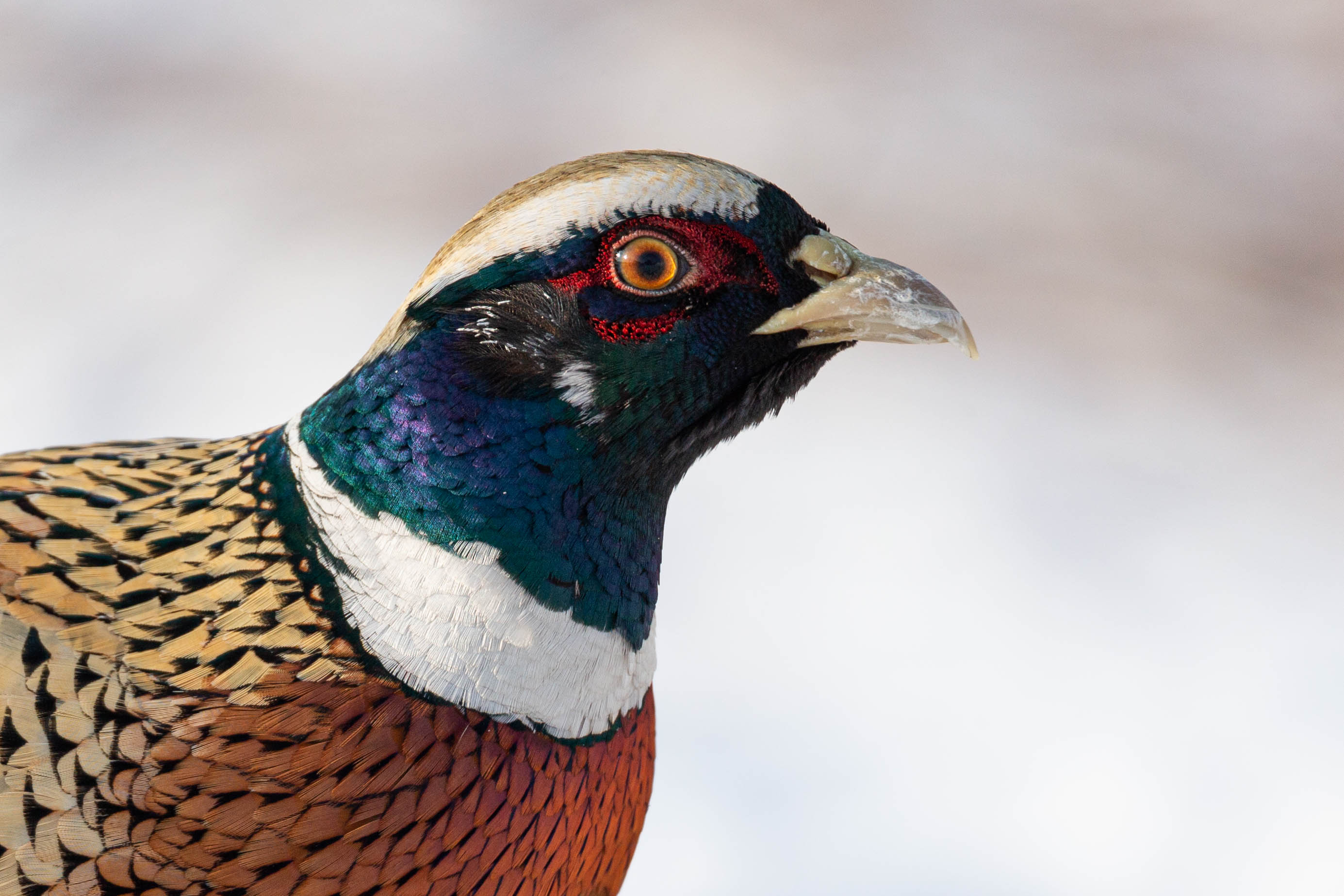
Phasianus colchicus pallasi, Birobidzhan, Jewish Autonomous Oblast, Russia

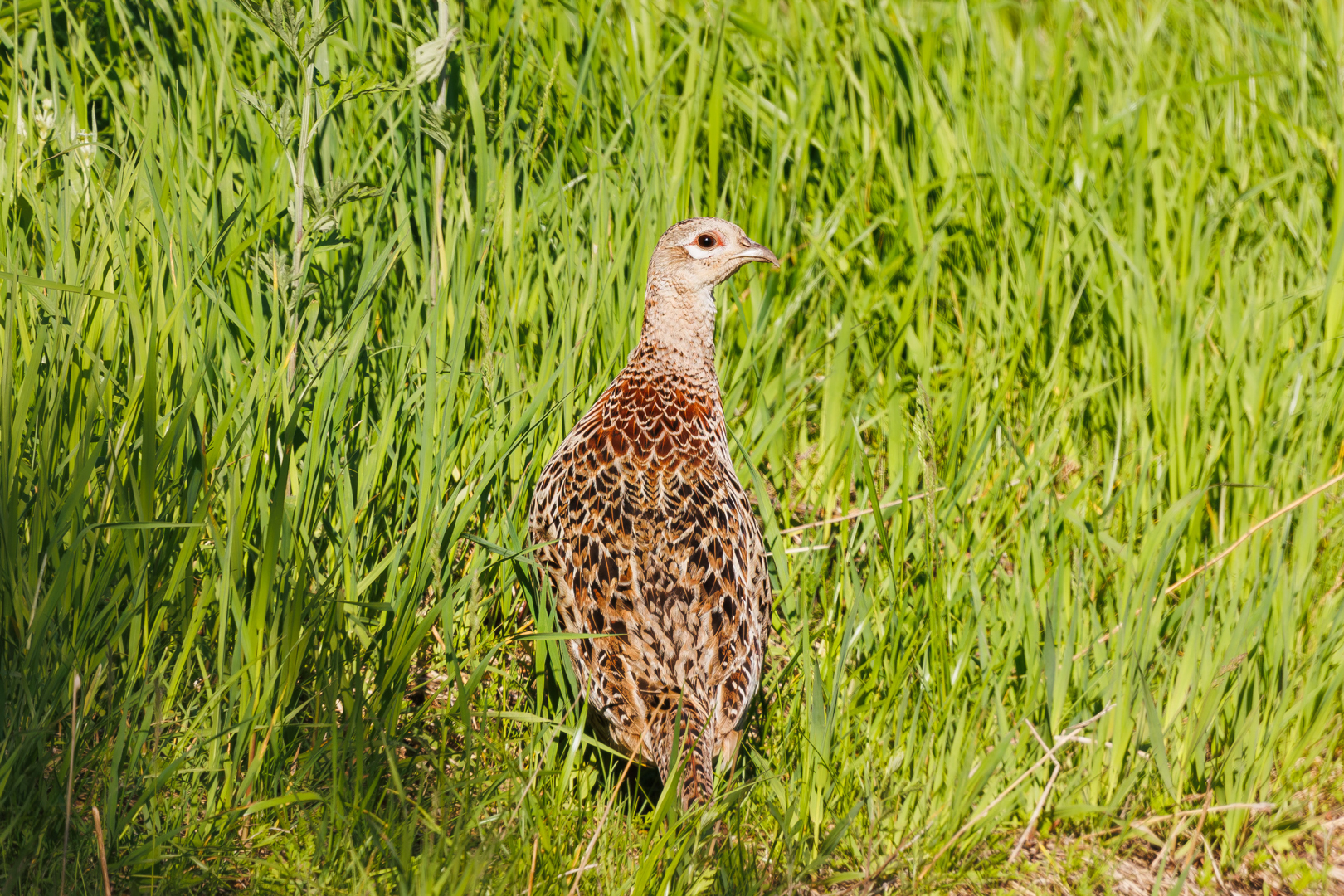
Phasianus colchicus pallasi female, Lake Khanka, Spasskiy Rayon, Primorye, Russia

Description: The plumage is dominated by straw-yellow and copper-brown tones. The crown is pale with a sandy-yellow or olive-brown tinge and a faint greenish gloss, lacking the rich base of P. c. karpowi and displaying an unvarnished appearance. It is bordered by broad white superciliary stripes, which frequently nearly meet across the forehead. In most males, a small white patch or trace is present within the black area below the ear-coverts, being absent in only about 17% of individuals in a population. The white neck collar is very broad and complete. For birds from North Korea that Mori considered pure P. c. pallasi, the collar measured 2.3-4.0 cm (mean 2.9 cm) in front and 0.9-2.0 cm (mean 1.3 cm) in the back, both wider than in P. c. karpowi. The mantle and flanks are pale straw-yellow or golden-straw-yellow. The scapulars bear extensive white or greyish-white central patches, inner black U-shaped scaling patterns, and light cinnamon-chestnut borders. The upper wing-coverts are bluish-grey, ash-grey, or light gray with sparse ochre stripes. The secondaries have broad, single-coloured borders with the marbled pattern largely confined to the feather centres. The chest and breast are pale brownish-red, rufous-red, or purplish copper-red with a faint metallic purple or violet gloss. Black feather margins are weakly developed, being exceptionally narrow, or almost obsolete. The rump appears greenish-blue in the median portion and pure grey or blue-grey on the sides. The feathers on the sides of the belly covering the vent are ochre-yellow. Compared with P. c. hagenbecki, P. c. pallasi is darker yellow and more golden, with a browner crown. The white patch below the ear-coverts is considerably more frequent than in that form, while the black margins of the breast feathers are much less pronounced. P. c. pallasi differs from P. c. karpowi and P. c. torquatus in its broader superciliary stripes, broader and more complete white collar, generally paler mantle plumage, and a shorter and paler tail on average. Females resemble those of P. c. karpowi but are lighter overall with less blackish upperparts, a brownish-white throat, and paler sandy-yellow underparts. Her upper back feathers are rusty-red with narrow light borders—unlike the wide-bordered dark brown feathers of red-rumped groups. Like P. c. karpowi, the females have dark brown or dark hazel irises.

Photographs: Photographs are available, for example, from Olginsky District, Primorsky Krai (Russia), from Konstantinovsky District, Amur Region (Russia), and from Heilongjiang (China): Harbin City, and Jiamusi City.

Measurements: Male wing length: Mori (North Korea): n=5: 226–249 mm (mean 231 mm); Taka-Tsukasa (North Korea): 226–248 mm; Dementyev: n = 16: 245–260 mm (mean 246.2 mm); n = 11: 247–278 mm (mean 259.5 mm); Delacour: 248–270 mm; Vaurie: n = 10: 239–253 mm (mean 247 mm); Zheng: n = 5: 235–245 mm; Liu et al.: n = 7: 226–245 mm (mean 241.2 mm); Ma et al.: n = 42: 228–247 mm (mean 233.6 mm).

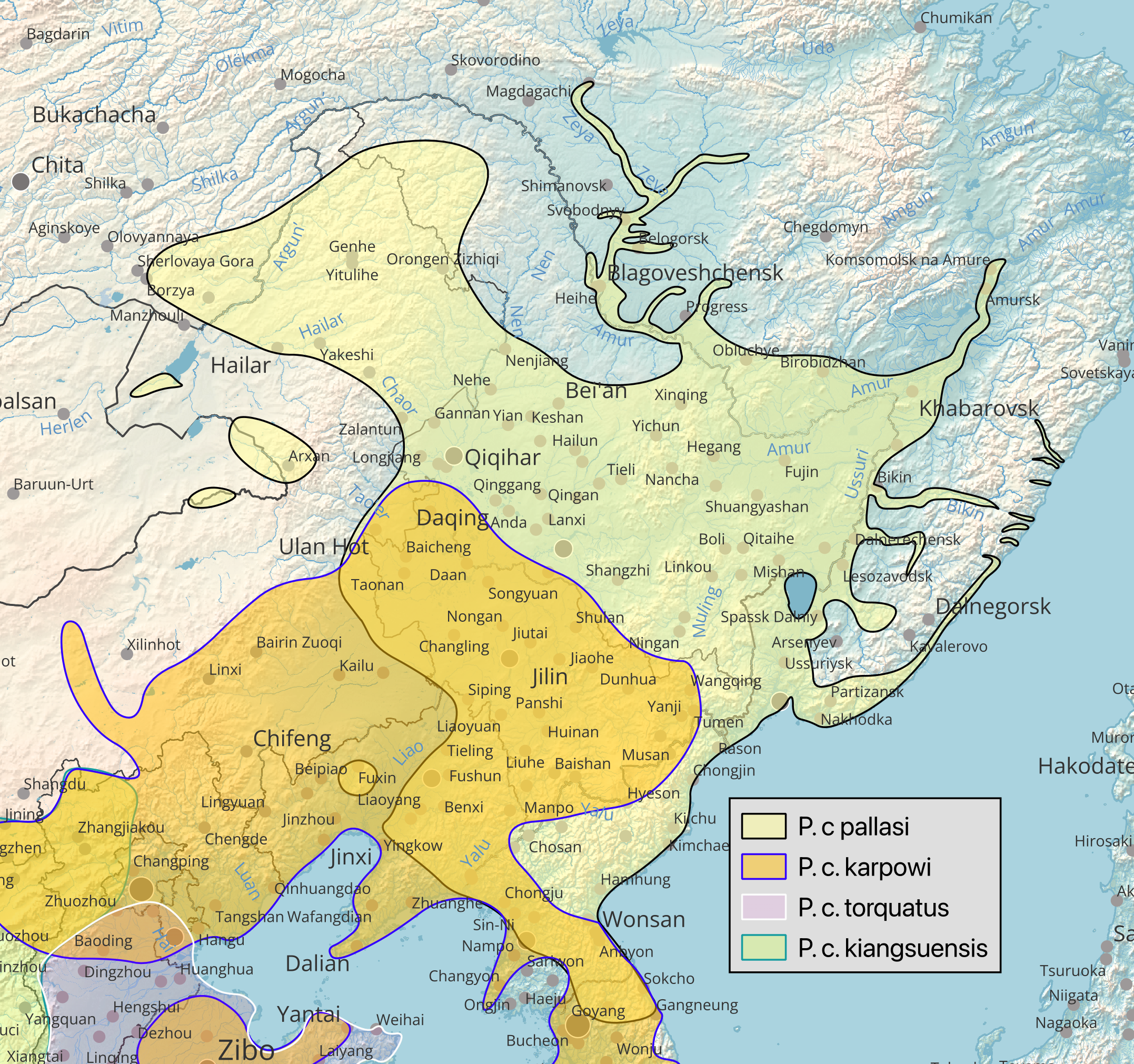
Distribution range of P. c. pallasi.

Distribution: P. c. pallasi occupies southeastern Siberia (Ussuriland and southern Amurland), northeastern China, extreme eastern Mongolia, and the mountainous regions of northern and eastern North Korea, reaching southward into northeastern South Korea within a broad zone of intergradation with P. c. karpowi. Its range extends across the east and south slopes of the Greater and Lesser Khingan Mountains and adjacent lowlands. The core range comprises Heilongjiang, northern Jilin, the Amur basin, the Ussuri region, and the Kaema Plateau and northeastern Mountains of North Korea. Southward, towards the Korean Peninsula, it intergrades extensively with P. c. karpowi. In the Tieling region, both karpowi- and pallasi-like phenotypes occur at comparable frequencies, and intergrades have been recorded as far south as 37° N on the Korean Peninsula (see under P. c karpowi). In Russia, the subspecies is distributed throughout the Ussuri basin and the South Ussuri region. It reaches the lower Ussuri River and occurs locally near its confluence with the Amur, but apparently does not extend north of Vladimir Bay along the Sea of Japan coast. Expansion northward and northeastward has been facilitated by forest clearance and the secondary growth of shrubby habitats. Along the Amur, the range extends to Chernyaevo and Yekaterino-Nikolskoye, formerly reaching as far as Blagoveshchensk. Near Kumara, pheasants also occur away from the river valleys and reach approximately 52°30' N in the Selemdzha valley. The largest Russian population occurs in the Zeya-Bureya depression. Pallas also recorded the subspecies along the Argun River and in the vicinity of Abagaytuy. It occurs in the Sungari basin, limited here by the Greater Khingan. In Primorye, P. c. pallasi is primarily associated with the western low-mountain region, extending into the foothills and middle sections of the major river valleys, but is absent from the continuous forested massif of the Sikhote-Alin. It breeds on the Borisovskoye (Shufanskoye) basalt plateau in southwestern Primorye, in the lower Bikin river basin as far upstream as Verkhniy Pereval, and in the upper reaches of the Bolshaya Ussurka (Iman) River basin. The subspecies occurs throughout much of the middle and lower Ussuri valley, on the Khanka-Razdolnoye Plain, and in the extreme southwest of Primorye. Along the Sea of Japan coast, it inhabits the developed river valleys north to the lower Serebryanka (Sankhobe) River near Terney, with more irregular occurrence in the lower Kema, Amgu (Amagu), and Samarga river basins. It also breeds on several islands in Peter the Great Bay, including Russky, Popov, Reineke, and Putyatin islands, as well as on Askold Island, where it was introduced in 1875, and on Furugelm Island. Yamashina (1939) referred specimens from Hulunbuir, Heihe, Qiqihar, Harbin, Mudanjiang, Ning'an, Jilin, Shenyang (Mukden), Anshan, and Linxi to P. c. pallasi (including the synonymic form "alpherakyi"). The subspecies was also recorded along the Chinese–North Korean border on the Yalu River near Chunggang, along the Tumen River southwest of Musan, in Hoeryong, and in Namyang, in the Hunchun River valley, and on the North Korean coast in Chongjin, Myongchon, Kimchaek, Hamhung, and Wonsan. In the Myohyang Mountain Range and on the Kaema Plateau of North Korea, Mori observed only subspecies P. c. pallasi. On the Korean Peninsula, the southern limit of the range lies within a broad zone of intergradation with P. c. karpowi, extending south to approximately Kaesong. Mori recorded pallasi-type birds east of the Taebaek Mountains at Hamhung, Wonsan, and Uljin, and west of the Taebaek Mountains at Nyongbyon, Namch'on, Pocheon, and Yangju. The subspecies also breeds in extreme eastern Mongolia, where it occurs in the valleys of the Nömrög and Degee rivers within Numrug National Park, throughout the Khalkh River valley and its tributaries from the foothills of the Greater Khingan to the delta, and in the Avdrant region along the Chinese border at approximately 118°E.

Habitat: The subspecies primarily inhabits floodplain forests and wetlands associated with broad river valleys and lakeshores. Typical habitats include poplar and willow woodlands with dense undergrowth, tall grasses, and shrubby thickets, as well as oak forests with a well-developed shrub layer. In Primorye, breeding birds occupy a wide range of open and semi-open habitats, including agricultural margins, lightly wooded landscapes, oak woodlands on hillsides, and dry ridges surrounded by extensive marshes and wet meadows. Outside the breeding season, pheasants concentrate in agricultural areas, particularly rice, soybean, and maize fields, as well as in vegetable gardens. P. c. pallasi is partial migratory. Northern and northwestern populations move southward from Russia into Manchuria during winter, whereas reverse movements into Russia have occasionally been recorded in late summer and autumn, possibly in response to seasonal food shortages in northeastern China. Mori similarly hypothesised that Korean populations of P. c. pallasi descended southward from northern highlands during winter and generally occupied more mountainous habitats than P. c. karpowi in areas of overlap. Such seasonal movements may have contributed to the development and maintenance of the broad zone of intergradation between P. c. pallasi and P. c. karpowi.

==== 2.3.3. Phasianus colchicus karpowi (Korean grey-rumped pheasant) ====
Authority and original description: Buturlin, S. A. 1904.

Type locality: Te-lin, southern Manchuria.

Protonym and synonyms:

- Phasianus karpowi Buturlin, S. A. 1904 — protonym
- Phasianus karpowi buturlini Clark, A. H. 1907 — junior synonym
- Phasianus torquatus quelpartis Momiyama, T. 1926 — junior synonym

Local names: 雉鸡河北亚种 (Chinese: Hebei subspecies of Common Pheasant), 한국꿩 (Korean: Korean Pheasant), Корейский фазан (Russian: Korean Pheasant)

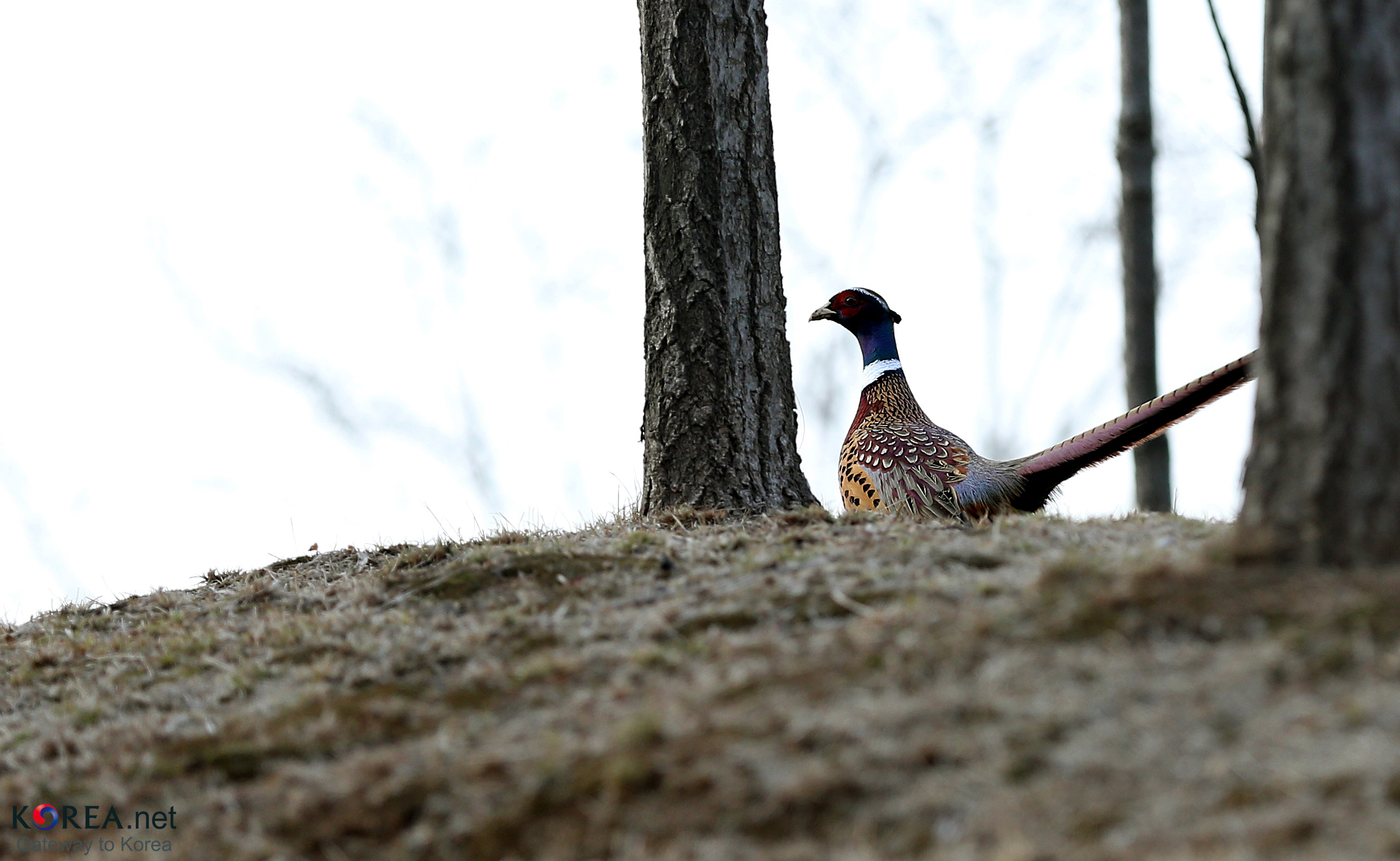
Phasianus colchicus karpowi

Description: The plumage of this subspecies is characterized by rich, intense tones. The crown is oily bronze-brown to brownish-olive, appearing yellowish-olive with a faint greenish gloss or more rusty brown and ochre-bronze-brownish than in related forms. Due to this pale ochre-bronze tipping over a dark base, it may appear lighter than in P. c. torquatus. The white superciliary stripes are usually well developed, being often variegated with dark chestnut-rust or maroon-red along their margins, though their width is typically smaller than or equal to the eye diameter. A white spot below the ear-coverts is characteristically absent in pure populations. Although La Touche reported white ear-spots to be common in pheasants sold during winter at the Chinwangtao (Qinhuangdao) market, Hartert noted that many birds offered there originated from the Harbin region and were therefore referable to P. c. pallasi. The white neck collar is broad anteriorly and narrower posteriorly. In Korean specimens from south of the Taebaek Mountains, which Mori regarded as representative of P. c. karpowi, the collar measured 1.2-2.0 cm (mean 1.5 cm) anteriorly and 0.4-0.6 cm (mean 0.5 cm) posteriorly in width. It often shows a distinct lateral constriction that produces a characteristic "kink" where the collar reaches its greatest width along the sides of the neck. This complete, uninterrupted collar pattern resembles that of P. c. pallasi, although the collar is generally lower and narrower. Often, this collar is accompanied immediately below by another narrow, nearly complete dark-green or greenish-black ring. The upper back, sides of breast, flanks, and sides of abdomen are intense golden orange to ochraceous-orange. Feathers of the upper back bear dark green shaft wedges and margins, while the deep golden-orange flanks feature large terminal spots and glossy bluish or cherry-red borders near the belly. The scapulars are broadly edged with dull chocolate-red, dark Indian-red, or purplish-carmine, and exhibit white spots or cream-whitish centers interspersed with black speckles. The upper wing-coverts are never white or rufous, being instead predominantly bluish-grey or light gray. The rump is olive-green to brownish-olive, exhibiting buff and dark bluish-green markings at the base and a distinct rusty-orange patch on each side. The upper tail-coverts are greyish-green, while the tail is olive, crossed by broad black bars and suffused with greyish-maroon along the sides. The breast is a fiery copper-red or purple-copper red, narrowly margined with dark-blue or violet-black borders that fail to reach the tip. Compared with P. c. pallasi, the male is typically darker and more richly coloured and possesses a narrower white neck collar. In plumage colouration, P. c. karpowi is intermediate between P. c. pallasi and P. c. kiangsuensis. It closely resembles P. c. torquatus but differs in its richer, deeper colouration on the back and flanks, and in its broader white superciliary stripes and neck collar. Females have predominantly blackish upperparts marked with Van Dyke's brown and buff margins. The underparts are tinged with yellow, with the lower breast and abdomen specifically being pale ochreous-buff and the flanks bearing large black V-shaped markings. The iris of the female is dark brown or dark hazel, like that of P. c. pallasi, but unlike the yellowish iris of P. c. kiangsuensis females.

Photographs: Photographs are, for example, available from Chifeng (Inner Mongolia, China), Jilin (Jilin, China), Anshan (Liaoning, China), Baishi Reservoir Wetland, Chaoyang (Liaoning, China), Lüshunkou District, Dalian (Liaoning, China), Dongsong-eup, Cheorwon-gun (Gangwon-do, South Korea), Wadong-dong, Paju-si (Gyeonggi-do, South Korea), and Seopae-dong, Paju-si, (Gyeonggi-do, South Korea).

Measurements: Male wing length: Kuroda (Tsushima islands): n=10: 226–243 mm; Mori (southern South Korea): n=7: 227–239 mm (mean 234.2 mm); Taka-Tsukasa: 232–257 mm; Delacour, Zheng: 240–260 mm; Zheng: n = 10: 217–235 mm (mean 228.5 mm); Huang: n = 5: 235–245 mm; Liu et al.: n = 8: 223–240 mm (mean 235.3 mm); Zheng: n = 7: 236–250 mm.

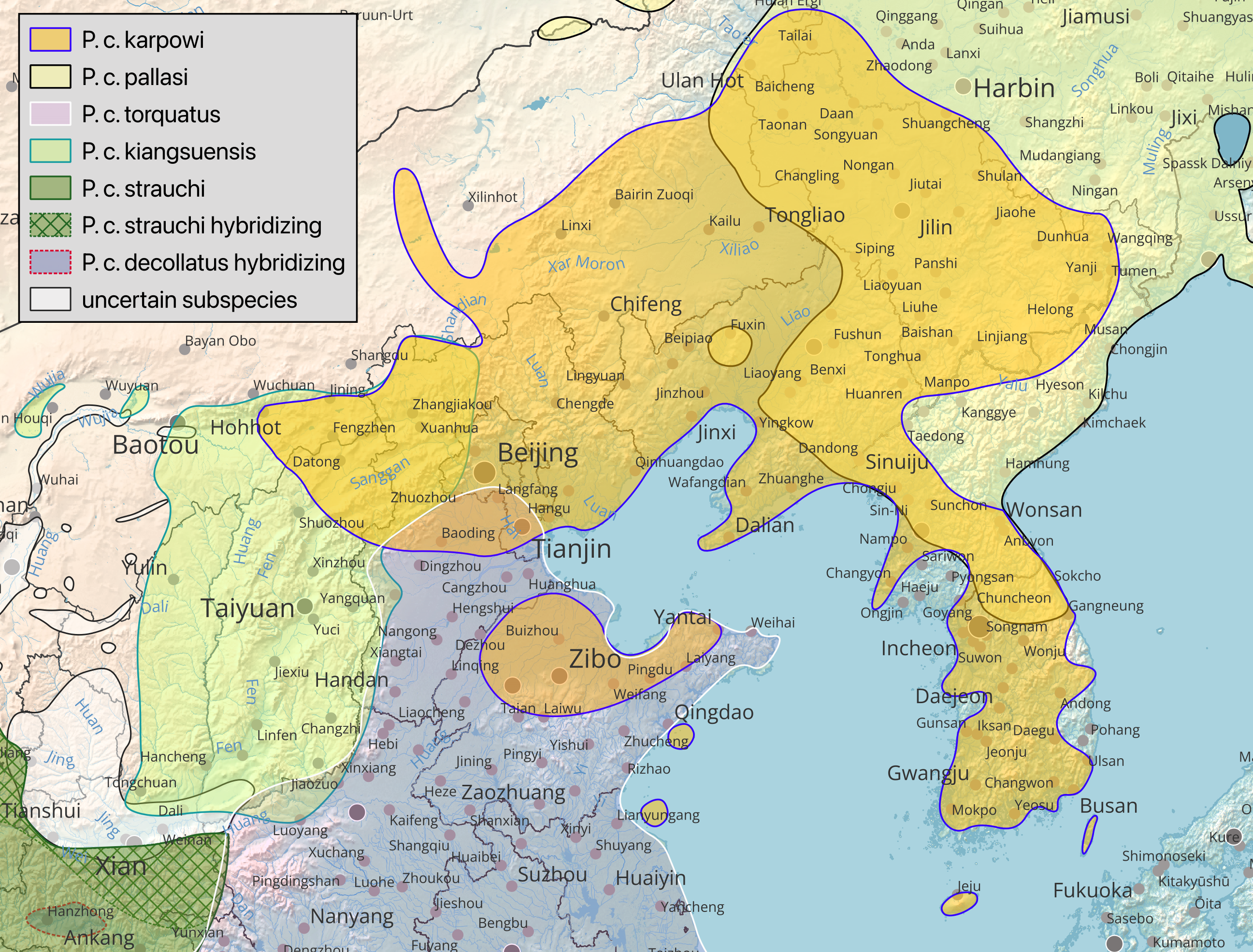
Distribution range of P. c. karpowi.

Distribution: This subspecies occurs in northeastern China, including extreme southern Heilongjiang, Jilin, northern Liaoning, eastern Inner Mongolia, and northern Hebei, as well as throughout much of the Korean Peninsula, predominating south of the principal zone of intergradation with P. c. pallasi. It is also present on Jeju Island and Tsushima Island. Introduced populations occur in Japan and Taiwan. In northern Hebei, P. c. karpowi is distributed in the Yanshan Mountains, including the regions of Chengde, Tangshan, and Qinhuangdao. It occurs throughout Beijing and Tianjin. In eastern Inner Mongolia, it inhabits the Hanshan Mountains (a spur of the Greater Khingan Mountains) in Chifeng and the Qilaotu Mountains, an eastern extension of the Yanshan range. In Liaoning, it is widespread and apparently absent only from the estuaries of the Yingna and Diyin rivers in the Dalian region. In northeastern China, the subspecies occurs from the upper Sungari (Songhua) basin south to Liaoyang, and extends westward into the middle and lower Liao River valleys. It has occasionally been recorded in the southernmost part of the Russian Ussuri Region. In addition, birds referable to P. c. karpowi have been recorded in Shandong Province, where the subspecies co-occurs with P. c. torquatus, from Binzhou (Donghai, Beihai, and Pucheng Reservoirs), Dizhou (Huadian in Qihe County), Dongying (Hekou District), Jinan Airport, Qingdao (Lingshan Island), Donggang District of Rizhao (Shijiusuo, Dashan Island, Pingshan Island), Yantai, and Zibo. It occurs as a passage migrant in the Yellow River Delta and on Chaolian Island, as a summer visitor on the Cheniushan Island, and as both a summer visitor and passage migrant in the eastern suburbs of Jining (Rencheng District). Some Shandong populations may be derived from historical introductions originating from the Liaodong Peninsula. P. c. karpowi intergrades extensively with P. c. pallasi on the Korean Peninsula and in northeastern China. The principle zone of intergradation extends approximately from 37° N to 40° N in Korea. Mori considered this zone to reflect the southward spread of P. c. pallasi along the Taebaek Mountain system and its subsidiary ranges. Intermediate birds were observed at Uljin, Chungju, Yangju, Cheorwon, Kombullang, Wonsan, Hamhung, and Sinuiju, and the zone continues northward through Jilin into southern Heilongjiang. After correcting for the approximately 18% of pure P. c. pallasi males that lack a white ear spot, Morikawa's 1925 data indicate that the proportion of birds showing karpowi phenotype increased southward: approximately 12-25% around Jilin and Changchun, about 30% near Siping, and roughly 45-60% in the Tieling, Shenyang, and Liaodong peninsula regions. By contrast, only about 20% of males in the Dandong region, on the border between China and North Korea, exhibited the karpowi phenotype, whereas approximately 80% did so in North Pyongan, northwestern North Korea. Morikawa further suggested that many apparently pure P. c. karpowi in Dalian on the southern Liaodong Peninsula originated from birds introduced from Incheon. These birds may subsequently have spread northward towards Tieling and Jilin, interbreeding with P. c. pallasi. P. c. karpowi also intergrades with P. c. kiangsuensis in the mountains north and west of Beijing, and with P. c. torquatus south of Beijing and Tianjin, and in Shandong. In recent decades, birds showing the karpowi phenotype have additionally been reported from the northwestern bend of the Yellow River, including Bayannur and Wuhai. The subspecies composition on the Ordos Plateau and adjacent Yellow River basin remains poorly understood.

Habitat: P. c. karpowi primarily inhabits hilly and low-mountain landscapes, typically between 150 and 600 m elevation, where slopes are covered with shrub vegetation, including coniferous thickets and deciduous scrub. In South Korea, near Ulsan, pheasants were found in landscapes consisting of terraced rice fields interspersed with hills 15–150 m high and separated by narrow valleys. During winter, birds were consistently associated with hillsides covered by dense shrub vegetation, particularly low coniferous thickets 60–120 cm in height. Farther north, between Tumen and Yalu rivers, the subspecies occupies sparsely wooded hills 150–600 m high dominated by oak and birch, as well as cultivated valleys and adjacent slopes. In Jilin, it inhabits a wide variety of habitats below 1,400 m, including broad-leaved forest, secondary woodland, plantations, farmland, shrublands, grassland, and wasteland, showing a particular preference for hilly areas dominated by secondary oak forest. In the Beijing region, pheasants breed in higher mountain areas during summer and descend to foothills or plains in autumn. Near Baihuashan Forest Farm, breeding birds move to mountain slopes above 1,200 m during the breeding season. In Liaoning, the subspecies is most frequently encountered in mountainous and hilly grasslands, shrublands, valley meadows, forest-edge grasslands, and reed marshes. Throughout northeastern China, seasonal elevational movements are common: birds occupy higher elevations during summer and shift to foothill shrublands, cultivated areas, reed marshes, and hilly shrub in autumn. Following snowfall, they retreat into dense grassland and shrub cover within more secluded open woodland, later returning to more open habitats.

==== 2.3.4. Phasianus colchicus torquatus (Eastern Chinese grey-rumped pheasant) ====
Authority and original description: Gmelin, J. F. 1789.

Type locality: China, ex Latham. Restricted type locality, southeastern China.

Protonym and synonyms:

- Phasianus torquatus Gmelin, J. F. 1789 — protonym
- Phasianus holdereri gmelini Buturlin, S. A. 1904 — junior synonym

Local names: 雉鸡华东亚种 (Chinese: East China subspecies of Common Pheasant)

Description: The crown of the male is glossy olive-green to greyish bronze-green, while the nape is dark glossy green, contrasting with the distinctly bronze-brown crown of P. c. karpowi. The superciliary stripes are creamy white and usually fairly broad, although narrower than the diameter of the eye, extending from the forehead to the base of the iridescent ear tufts, although they may vary individually and are occasionally missing completely. A white neck collar is always present, although its degree of completeness varies. The collar is only exceptionally interrupted behind the neck, whereas in front, above the crop, it is interrupted in approximately half of the males and markedly constricted in the remainder. The collar is considerably narrower than in P. c. karpowi but broader and more distinct than in other adjacent forms. The mantle feathers are broadly edged in brownish-yellow to golden-yellow. These margins are edged bluish-black and separated from the whitish to brownish-white feather centres by a black stripe; each feather also bears a blue-black patch at the tip. The scapulars are broadly bordered reddish-brown, with a glossy purple-red outer margin separated from the central feather surface by a narrow violet line. The rump and upper tail-coverts are pale bluish-grey, sometimes darker, often showing a violet shimmer when seen against the light. The central lower back is greenish, the feathers being edged greenish-grey and marked with pale yellow-brown centres, black spotting and wavy marks. The posterior upper tail-coverts are yellowish-green and bear a large, vividly rust-yellow patch on either side. The crop and upper chest feathers are broadly fiery, becoming more golden red-brown on the sides, with a purplish copper-red metallic gloss. Individual feathers are very narrowly margined in black and bear an elongated triangular shaft patch near the tip. The flanks are straw yellow, each feather terminating in a rounded blue-black spot but lacking distinct terminal margins. The centre of the underparts is black with greenish steel-blue edges. The central tail feathers are yellowish-grey and bear relatively broad black transverse bands that grade into chestnut towards the outer margins of the feathers. These bands are broader than those reported for red-rumped species, but less broad than those reported for P. c. formosanus and P. c. decollatus. During the breeding season, abrasion of the black margins of the mantle feathers and, particularly, of the pale blue and greenish margins of the rump and lower back feathers exposes the feather centres and causes the brownish-yellow colouration to fade, substantially altering the appearance of the upperparts. The subspecies exhibits a north-south cline. Towards the south, the neck collar becomes progressively narrower and increasingly incomplete, while darker yellow tones on the mantle and flanks become more frequent. Females have a pale greyish-fawn to light vinaceous-fawn ground colour. The chin, cheeks, and upper throat are whitish to plain brownish-white. The upper back feathers are bright hazel or reddish at the base, becoming fuscous-black distally and edged with pale vinaceous-fawn fringes.

Photographs: Photographs are, e.g., available from Songfancun (Panxin Town, Luoshan County Xinyang, Henan), from Majia River Wetland, Nanle County (Puyang City, Henan), from Gongqing Forest Park in Shanghai (darker morph), from Jiujiang (Jiangxi), from Shenzhen (Guangdong), and from Nanling National Nature Reserve (Guangdong).

Measurements: Male wing length: Ogilvie-Grant: 234 mm; Hartert, Dementyev, Vaurie: n = 10: 240–254 mm (mean 246 mm); Delacour: 240–255 mm; Wu: n = 32: 223–241 mm (mean 230.5 mm); Liu et al.: n = 21: 222–247 mm (mean 235.7 mm).

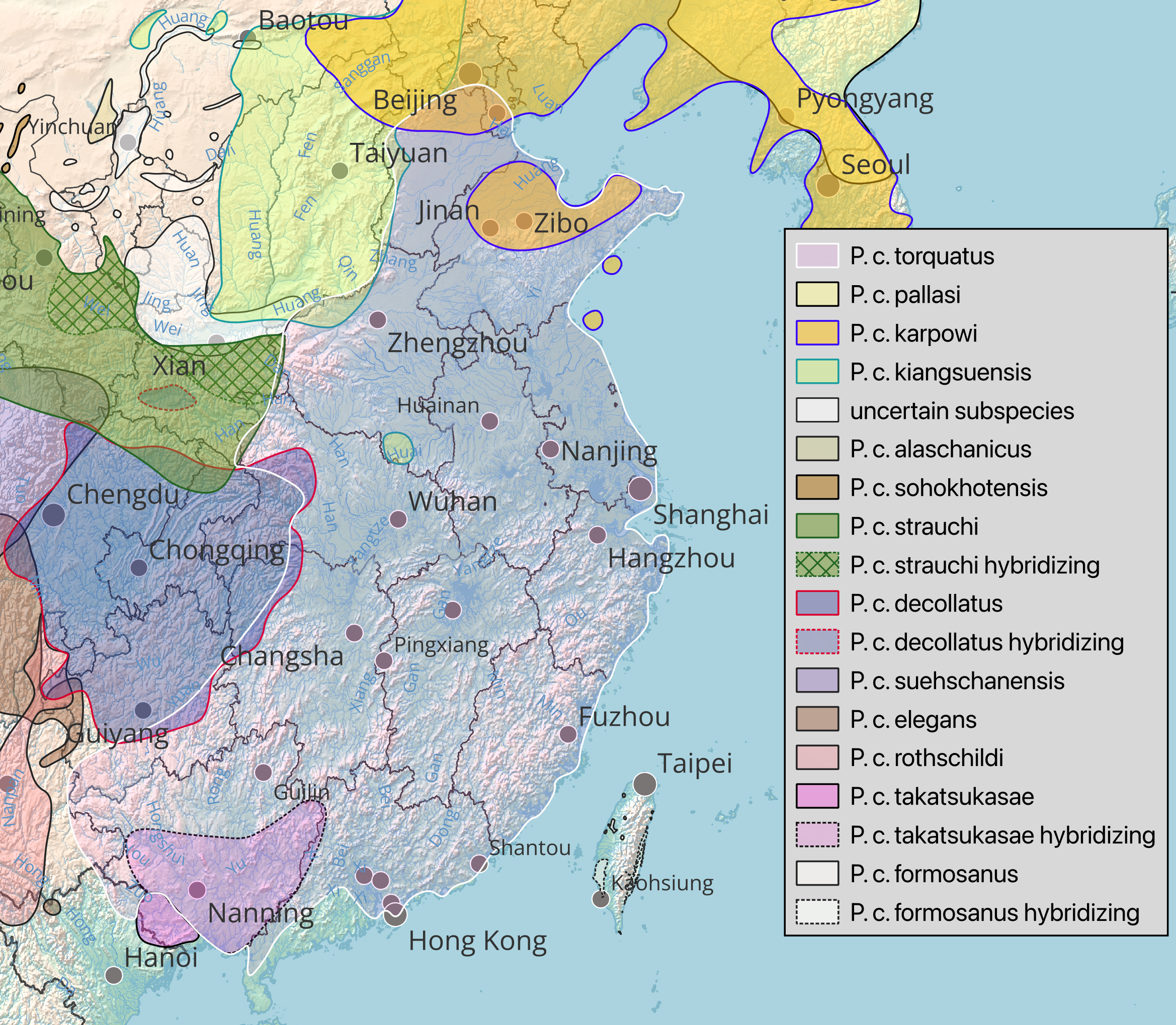
Distribution range of P. c. torquatus.

Distribution: P. c. torquatus is distributed throughout much of eastern and southeastern China, extending from the lower Yellow River basin in Shandong and Henan south to the China–Vietnam border region. Its range includes Hebei, Shandong, Henan, Shaanxi, Ningxia, Anhui, Jiangsu, Shanghai, Zhejiang, Jiangxi, Hunan, Hubei, Guizhou, Fujian, Guangdong, and Guangxi. In Hebei, the subspecies is confined to the southeastern lowlands. In Hunan, it is restricted to areas south of the Wuling mountains. In Guizhou, it has been recorded from Xingyi, Wangmo, Ceheng, Rongjiang, Huishui, Pingtang, Luodian, and Congjiang counties. In Guangdong, it is distributed in the northern mountainous regions, including Lechang, Yangshan, Lianshan, Yingde, Qingyuan, Huaiji, and Lianxian counties. The subspecies intergrades extensively with neighbouring forms. Hybridisation with P. c. karpowi and P. c. kiangsuensis occurs north of the Yellow River; with P. c. strauchi in the Guanzhong Plain; with P. c. decollatus near the rapids of Yichang, in western-central Hunan, and across a broad zone east and south of the Red Basin of Sichuan, including the Huishui–Pingtang region of Guizhou; with P. c. takatsukasae in Guangxi and southern Guangdong; and with P. c. elegans in the Xingyi region of Guizhou. Intergradation with P. c. rothschildi may also occur along the southeastern margins of the Yungui Plateau. The taxonomic identity of pheasant populations inhabiting the Loess Plateau north of the Guanzhong Plain and the region east of the Helan Shan remains uncertain, although these birds are phenotypically closest to P. c. torquatus.

Habitat: The subspecies occupies three principal habitat types: extensive riverine reedbeds, often forming dense stands up to 5 m tall; low, 30–60 m high rolling hills, covered with scrub oak, chestnut, and pine, or dense grass undergrowth; and cultivated lowlands dominated by rice, wheat, or millet. In Zhejiang, P. c. torquatus is widespread in mountains and hilly terrain, where it inhabits shrubland, bamboo forest, grassland, forest-edge habitats, tea plantations, mixed woodland, and coniferous forest, often in close association with agricultural land. In Guizhou, the subspecies occurs between approximately 250 and 2,100 m elevation. In Guangdong, it inhabits shrubby slopes in low hills and mountains, showing a preference for dense thickets and grassy slopes adjacent to cultivated areas.

==== 2.3.5. Phasianus colchicus takatsukasae (Tonkinese grey-rumped pheasant) ====
Authority and original description: Delacour, J. T. 1927.

Type locality: Langson, Tonkin (Vietnam).

Protonym and synonyms:

- Phasianus colchicus takatsukasae Delacour, J. T. 1927 — protonym

Local names: 雉鸡广西亚种 (Chinese: Guangxi subspecies of Common Pheasant), Trĩ đỏ khoang cổ (Vietnamese: Ring-necked Red Pheasant)

Description: P. c. takatsukasae represents a dark southern derivative of P. c. torquatus, characterised by a greatly reduced supercilium and neck collar. The male closely resembles P. c. torquatus but is generally darker and more richly coloured throughout. The flanks and upper back are a deeper yellow-golden, the breast is dark-red or deep purplish-red, and the chestnut areas of the scapulars and greater wing-coverts are darker and more maroon in tone. The lower back is darker and browner, while the purplish margins of the tail feathers are more strongly developed. The white superciliary stripes are reported to be present but are narrow. The white neck collar is narrow and incomplete both anteriorly and posteriorly. Feathers of the upper back are bordered reddish-brown with dark mahogany-brown bases and terminate in black tips. The chest feathers are reddish-brown, each bearing a narrow black shaft streak and a distinctly bilobed tip. The scapulars possess broad reddish-brown margins with an inner black band and pale reddish-brown band. The lower back and rump are greenish-brown with irregular transverse black and pale-brown barring. The tail is yellowish with a greenish sheen, crossed by black transverse bands bordered in purplish-brown. The margins of the central rectrices and the outer edges of the remaining tail feathers are purplish-brown with a greenish sheen. The belly is dark brown with a reddish wash, most pronounced on the upper abdomen. The flanks are bright orange-yellow, each feather marked distally by a triangular black streak. The female resembles that of P. c. torquatus but is altogether darker and exhibits coarser, heavier markings. The crown and neck are dark brown or black with narrow reddish-brown bars, while the chin and throat are greyish-yellow with dark-brown streaking. Notably, the female iris is reported to be reddish-brown, which is unusual among the southeastern Chinese subspecies.

Photographs: No photograph that can be confidently assigned to this subspecies is currently available online.

Measurements: Male wing length: Vo, Delacour: 225–245 mm.

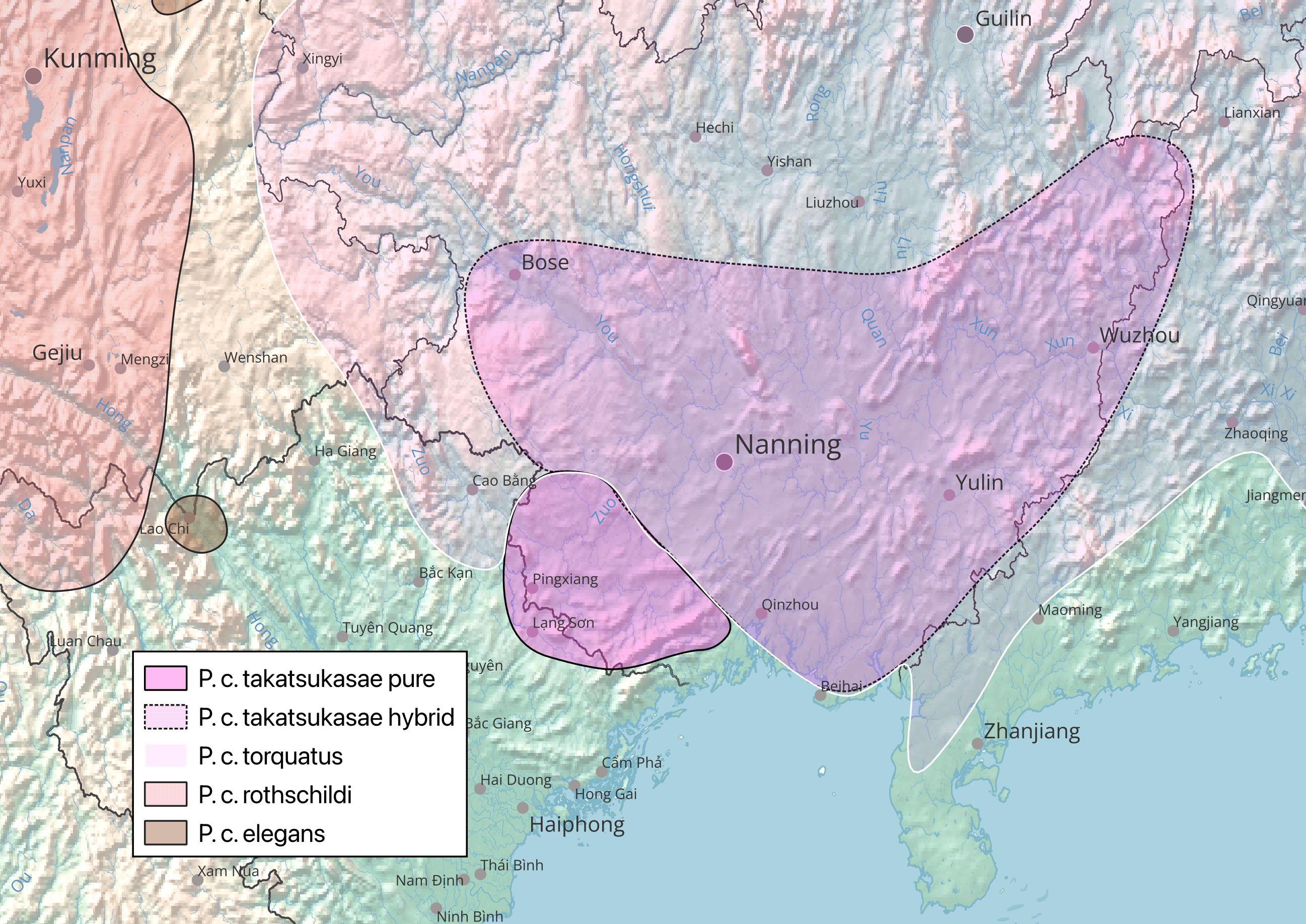
Distribution range of P. c. takatsukasae.

Distribution: P. c. takatsukasae has been reported from southeastern China, including the low and middle mountain ranges of the region around Beihai City, southwestern Guangxi, and extreme southeastern Yunnan, as well as from northeastern Vietnam (eastern Tonking), including Lang Son, Cao Bằng, and Quảng Ninh provinces. The subspecies has been reported to intergrade with P. c. torquatus in Guangxi and southern Guangdong. Birds from Lạng Sơn in eastern Tonkin are considered typical takatsukasae, whereas those from Ngan Son in northeastern Tonkin have been referred to P. c. torquatus. The precise distribution of P. c. takatsukasae remains poorly understood. Its current status in Vietnam is uncertain, and it is unclear whether viable populations persist there. Delimitation of the taxon in southern China is further complicated by the incomplete understanding of geographic variation within P. c. torquatus itself. Consequently, the extent and nature of intergradation between these forms remain unresolved. The taxonomic status of P. c. takatsukasae also requires further study in relation to P. c. rothschildi, which occurs farther west within the same general region. More broadly, the relationships among the widespread subspecies P. c. elegans, P. c. decollatus, and P. c. torquatus and the more localised forms P. c. rothschildi and P. c. takatsukasae remain insufficiently understood, particularly about possible zones of hybridisation.

Habitat: This subspecies inhabits hilly and mountainous terrain and is typically encountered on grassy slopes at elevations of approximately 800 m above sea level. It also occurs in woodland habitats, including groves and pine forests.

==== 2.3.6. Phasianus colchicus decollatus (Kweichow grey-rumped pheasant) ====
Authority and original description: Swinhoe, R. 1870.

Type locality: Type from the market at Chunkingfu, Szechuan (Sichuan, China).

Protonym and synonyms:

- Phasianus decollatus Swinhoe, R. 1870 — protonym
- Phasianus colchicus hemptinnii La Touche, JDD 1919 — junior synonym

Local names: 雉鸡贵州亚种 (Chinese: Guizhou subspecies of Common Pheasant)

Description: The male resembles P. c. torquatus, but is more richly coloured overall and typically lacks a white neck collar. Occasionally, individuals show traces of a collar in the form of white spots or bands on the nape feathers, particularly in populations approaching the range of P. c. torquatus at the Ichang gorge. According to Hartert, indications of a white collar are not rare; some birds may even show a distinct narrow collar, typically interrupted both anteriorly and posteriorly, and only exceptionally anteriorly alone. Superciliary stripes are always absent. The crown is dark glossy green rather than pale bronze-green. The upper back is pale golden or pale yellow, the feathers marked with thick black shaft wedges that may show a narrow yellowish median streak and broad chestnut cross-marks, while the copper-brown or maroon scapulars contrast with the upper back. The chest is richly coppery-red, with very broad black feather margins that typically exhibit a dark green rather than purplish gloss. The greenish neck plumage terminates abruptly at the upper breast, forming a sharp line of demarcation with the coppery breast, in contrast to the more gradual transition seen in P. c. strauchi. The flanks are pale brownish yellow or buff, with the feathers narrowly tipped black, the black apical markings being much less extensive than in P. c. strauchi. The lower back, rump, upper tail-coverts, and dorsal surface of the tail resemble those of P. c. suehschanensis rather than P. c. strauchi in both colouration and pattern. The tail ground colour is dark ochre, showing relatively broad black transverse bars compared with P. c. torquatus, approaching the condition seen in P. c. formosanus. Females resemble those of P. c. torquatus and P. c. strauchi, but differ from the latter in having larger and more conspicuous black markings on the scapulars, wing-coverts, and lower back. In the northern part of the range, males tend to be darker with broader wedge-shaped apical spots and somewhat paler scapulars (form "berezowskyi"; see under P. c. strauchi); in this intermediate variation, males tend to show a predominance of golden-yellow on the interscapular region with somewhat wider apical spots and golden-rufous chest sides. Hybrids with P. c. torquatus (described as the form hemptinnii) typically possess dull yellowish to golden-yellow upper back and flank feathers with black spots near the tips, narrowly margined upper back feathers with black markings different from those of P. c. decollatus, a purplish chest and breast, wider black bands on the tail than in P. c. torquatus, a deep oily-green crown concolourous with the hindneck and with no distinct pale superciliaries, and a highly variable, narrow white collar that is always broken in front. In areas of contact with P. c. elegans, hybrids combine the rich copper-red chest of P. c. decollatus with a maroon to brownish-maroon back with fine black lines and golden-brown to chestnut-brown flanks resembling those of P. c. elegans. Hybrids with P. c. rothschildi similarly retain the characteristic copper-red breast of P. c. decollatus, whereas the upper back and flanks are more similar to those of P. c. rothschildi. The black markings on the lower flanks of these intergrades may resemble either parental form.

Photographs: Photographs are, e.g., available from Sichuan, from Deyang (Sichuan), from Chengdu (Sichuan), from Qinglong Lake (Chengdu, Sichuan), and from Longtou Temple Park (Chongqing, Yubei District).

Measurements: Male wing length: Swinhoe: 235 mm; Ogilvie-Grant: 234 mm; Delacour: 227–235 mm; Zheng, Liu et al.: n = 3: 230–242 mm (mean 237.3 mm); Wu: n = 36: 228–247 mm (mean 235.6 mm).

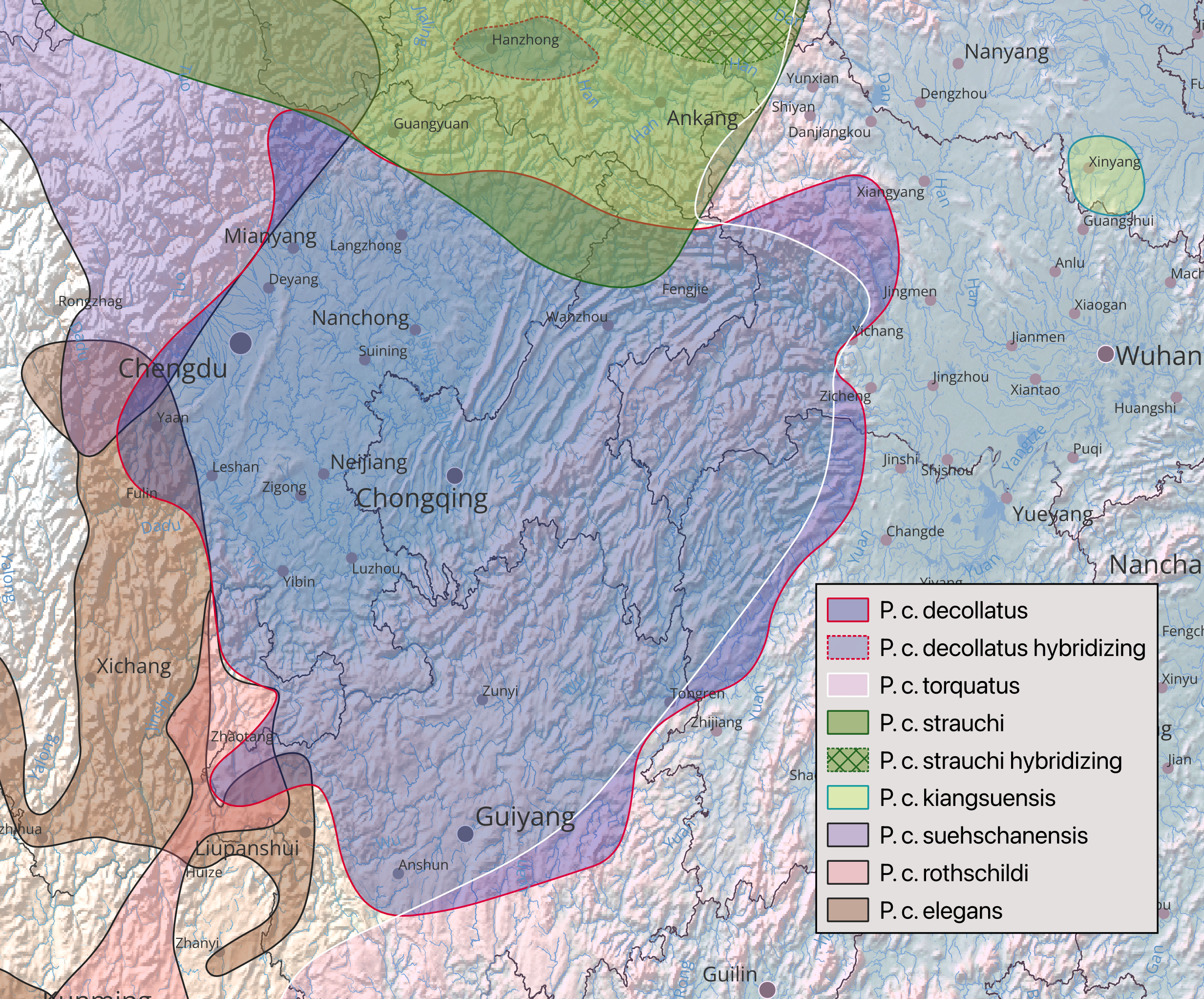
Distribution range of P. c. decollatus.

Distribution: P. c. decollatus occurs in central China, including eastern Sichuan, Chongqing, southwestern Hubei, northwestern Hunan, northeastern Yunnan, and northern and central Guizhou. Its distribution is centred on the Red Basin of Sichuan and adjacent hill country, extending southeastward into the Wu River drainage. A possibly isolated population also occurs in the Hanzhong Basin of southern Shaanxi. In Sichuan, the subspecies has been recorded from Pidu, Emeishan, Cuiping, Xuzhou, Ya'an, Tianquan, Baoxing, and Huaying; in Chongqing, from Wanzhou, Wushan, and Xiushan. In Hunan, it is confined to the Wuling mountain region of the northwest, including Longshan, Yuanling, Zhongfang, and Zhangjiajie. In Guizhou, it occurs in Chishui, Xishui, Zunyi, Suiyang, Jiangkou, Guiyang City, Qingzhen, Huishui, Guiding, and Leishan. In the Xingyi region it transitions to P. c. elegans, whereas in the Huishui– Pingtang area it grades into P. c. torquatus. In Yunnan, it is known from the lower mountain regions of northeastern Yunnan, including Daguan, Yiliang, and Zhenxiong counties in the eastern Zhaotong region. The subspecies intergrades with neighbouring forms. Hybridisation with P. c. torquatus occurs near the Yichang (Ichang) Gorges in Hubei and between the Wuling Mountains and the Xuefeng Mountains in Hunan; more generally, contact with P. c. torquatus occurs along the northeastern and southeastern margins of its range. In Guizhou, the Huishui–Pingtang region forms a transition zone with P. c. torquatus. Hybrids with P. c. elegans have been reported from Yongshan County in eastern Yunnan; furthermore, a transition zone between the two forms occurs in the Xingyi region of Guizhou. Hybrids with P. c. rothschildi occur in Yiliang County in the eastern Zhaotong region. In the mountains along the northern and northwestern margins of its range, P. c. decollatus also intergrades with P. c. strauchi and P. c. suehschanensis (including the form "berezowskyi", see under P. c. strauchi). Hybrids with the former occur in the Fujiang river valley, whereas hybrids with the latter occur in the Minjiang river valley. The population of the Hanzhong Basin in southern Shaanxi appears to represent an isolated northern outlier and occurs in contact with P. c. strauchi, which occupies the surrounding higher mountains.

Habitat: Within the Sichuan basin, P. c. decollatus inhabits low hilly terrain bordering rivers, generally occurring below 900 m elevation, although it may ascend to approximately 1,200 m south of Chongqing. In Guizhou it occurs between 350 and 1,560 m, and in Hunan between 800 and 1,500 m. Where it occurs alongside P. c. torquatus (for example, near the Yichang Gorges), P. c. decollatus generally occupies higher elevations, typically above 800 m. In contrast, where it occurs alongside P. c. strauchi, P. c. suehschanensis, or P. c. elegans, it tends to occupy the lower elevations. In the hybrid zones with P. c. strauchi and P. c. suehschanensis, hybrids have been recorded at considerably higher elevations, between approximately 1,200 and 2,700 m. In central and southwestern Baoxing, P. c. decollatus has been reported at elevations of 1,500–2,200 m, whereas P. c. suehschanensis, which is restricted to northern Baoxing, occupies considerably higher elevations during summer. The subspecies characteristically inhabits shrub-covered hillsides, open woodland bordering cultivated land, and grassy slopes on mountain spurs. It generally avoids forested areas and shows a preference for bushy fields and scrub habitats.

=== 2.4. Formosanus group (Taiwan pheasants) ===
This group is endemic to Taiwan. It resembles the Torquatus group, but males are distinguished by an anteriorly broadly interrupted white neck ring and by whitish to pure white flank feathers, which bear black apical spots and often narrow black margins. The chest feathers are broadly margined black, producing a conspicuous scaly appearance, a feature shared with P. c. decollatus and P. c. hagenbecki of the Torquatus group. The mean male wing length (~230 mm) is smaller than that of any subspecies in the Torquatus group.

==== 2.4.1. Phasianus colchicus formosanus (Taiwan grey-rumped pheasant) ====
Authority and original description: Elliot, D. G. 1870.

Type locality: Formosa (= Taiwan).

Protonym and synonyms:

- Phasianus formosanus Elliot, D. G. 1870 — protonym

Local name: 環頸雉台灣特有亞種 (Traditional Chinese: Taiwan endemic subspecies of Ring-necked Pheasant), 雉鸡台湾亚种 (Chinese: Taiwan subspecies of Common Pheasant)

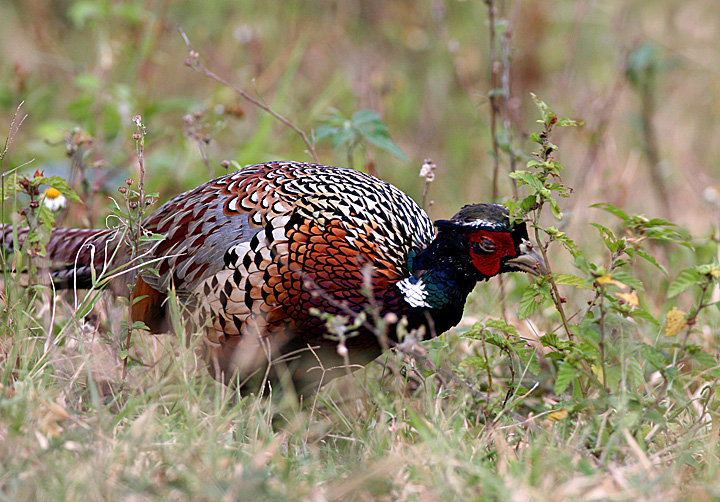
Phasianus colchicus formosanus

Phasianus colchicus formosanus, near Nan'ao, Yilan County, Taiwan

Description: The crown and occiput are pale greyish to ochraceous-ash with a greenish sheen, contrasting with the metallic blue-green feathers of the surrounding head and neck; in some lighting conditions, they may appear silvery-grey. The white superciliary stripes are narrow and may sometimes be indistinct or absent. A narrow but generally well-defined white neck collar is present, characteristically interrupted on the foreneck. The upper back is yellowish-buff to yellowish-white, with the outer margins of the feathers and a large triangular apical shaft-mark brilliant metallic green. The scapulars bear conspicuous, broad, glossy chestnut margins. The lower back and rump are patterned in black, creamy-yellow, and dark green, with pale greenish-grey terminal areas. As noted by Hartert, the metallic green bands preceding the greyish feather tips are considerably broader than in P. c. torquatus and may appear bluish in certain light, producing a more contrasting pattern. The chest is deep copper- or chestnut-red, appearing purplish in certain lighting; the feathers are margined with dark metallic blue or indigo and bear a triangular apical mark of the same colour. The flanks are white to creamy buff; each feather bears a black apical spot with a metallic blue gloss. The abdomen is blackish, separated from the pale flanks by a deep chestnut or reddish-brown band formed by the inner webs of the lowermost flank feathers. The central tail-feathers are pale green centrally and chestnut along the margins, with the green areas crossed by broad, closely spaced black transverse bands that become chestnut towards the feather edges. The lateral tail feathers are similar, but the inner webs are mottled buff and black, and the terminal portion of the outer web lacks barring. The iris is often characteristically white. Compared with typical P. c. torquatus, the male is generally paler, with characteristically whitish-buff flanks and a straw-coloured mantle, and has broader black tail bars, a character shared with P. c. decollatus. The female resembles that of P. c. torquatus but is darker, greyer, and more heavily marked with reddish-brown and blackish-brown patterning, particularly on the head, neck, and underparts. Both sexes are smaller than those of the mainland subspecies in all measured dimensions.

Photographs: Photographs are available from Tainan City, Dadu Mountain (Taichung City), Zhiben Wetland (Taitung), the Nan'ao River Mouth (Yilan County), and National Dong Hwa University (Hualien).

Measurements: Male wing length: Elliot: 241 mm; Hartert: n = 6: 220–237 mm; Taka-Tsukasa: 233–243 mm; Yamashina: n = 6: 219–226 mm; Delacour: 220–245 mm; Zheng: n = 1: 230 mm; Wang: n = 11: 231.2 ± 6 mm; n = 3: 230.0 ± 3 mm; Taiwan Forest Affairs Bureau: n = 9: 214–258 mm (mean 237.6 mm).

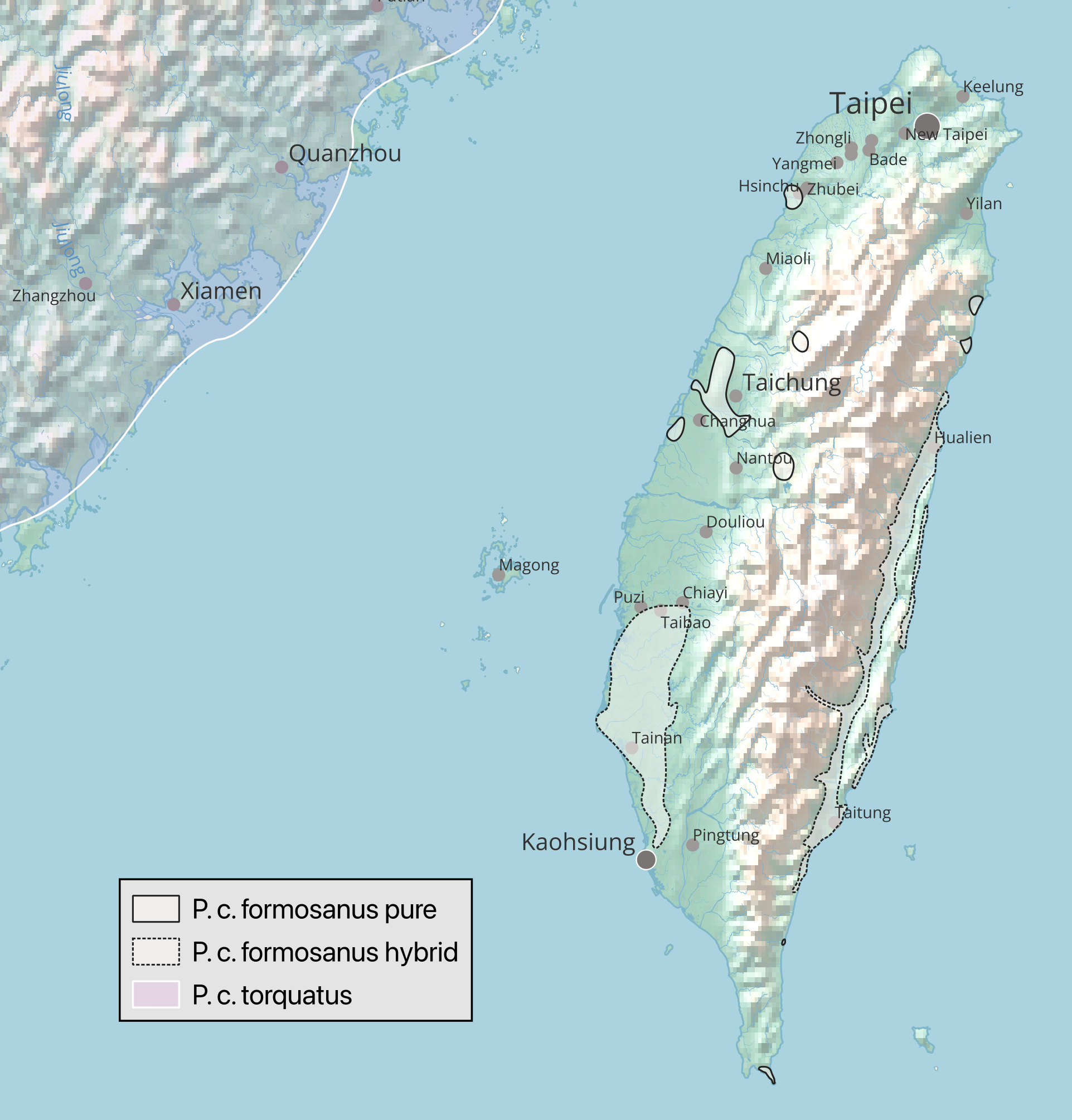
Distribution range of P. c. formosanus.

Distribution: P. c. formosanus is endemic to Taiwan and occurs primarily in lowland and foothill regions, being largely absent from the central mountain ranges. In a survey in 2004, it was observed in Fenglin, Chishang, Sheding, Shanhua, Xinshi, Shanshang, and Quinquangang. Historically, ring-necked pheasants were widely distributed across the plains and hills of Taiwan, except in the northwestern part of the island, where they were rare. Populations remained abundant until the mid-twentieth century, after which they declined sharply. The principal threat to the subspecies is extensive hybridisation with introduced pheasants. During the 1960s and 1970s, P. c. karpowi was released in the Jianan Plain for hunting purposes, while additional genetic introgression resulted from escaped farm-reared birds, including P. c. karpowi, P. c. torquatus, and hybrid stock imported from the USA. Since 1986, the Kenting National Park Administration has conducted restoration research within the park to assess the distribution of remaining wild populations and the extent of genetic contamination. During the 1990s, repeated reintroductions were carried out in the Longzipu area, although these met with limited success with a 35-day post-release survival rate of approximately 20%. Genetic surveys conducted in 2004 found that the population at Qingquangang (Taichung International Airport) retained a pure formosanus genotype, whereas evidence of introgression was detected in approximately 14% of the individuals sampled in the Tainan region and 7-10% of birds on the eastern side of the island. By 2023, only three relatively stable populations remained. One occupies the eastern side of Taiwan from Nan'ao in Yilan County south to Xianglan in Taitung County. Two additional populations occur on the western side of the island: a southern population extending from southern Chiayi to Zuoying in Kaohsiung, and a northern populations on the Dadu Plateau in Taichung. The latter has been affected by the expansion of Taichung International Airport, necessitating the translocation of birds from the airport grounds to habitats near the Dadu and Dajia rivers using trained dogs and tamed goshawks. A high nesting density was recorded in the Zhiben Wetlands of Taitung in 2018. P. c. formosanus is listed as Critically Endangered in the National Red List of Taiwan's Birds (2020). Active conservation education programmes in schools and local communities, combined with ecological monitoring, are currently being implemented to help prevent the extinction of this subspecies.

Habitat: The subspecies inhabits plains, riverbeds, hills surrounding the river terraces, agricultural land, and open woodland. It is particularly associated with tall grassland, miscanthus stands, shrubland, reedbeds, and other dense herbaceous vegetation. It also occurs in a variety of lowland agricultural habitats, including orchards, early-season fields of sugarcane, peanuts, and sweet potatoes, abandoned farmland, and sandy riverbanks. Nesting material is obtained from Bidens pilosa and Chromolaena odorata communities, as well as from vegetation in abandoned agricultural land. During periods of winter snowfall, birds seek shelter in dense sedge (Cyperaceae) vegetation associated with wetlands and other water bodies.

Note: Birds occurring on Kinmen Island are not referable to P. c. formosanus. They originate from introductions of mainland stock and are of uncertain subspecific composition. Available photographs indicate substantial hybridisation between red-rumped and grey-rumped pheasant forms.

== See also ==
- Phasianus colchicus
