= Oasis of Bukhara =

Oasis in Uzbekistan

Coordinates: 39°55′45″N 64°25′25″E

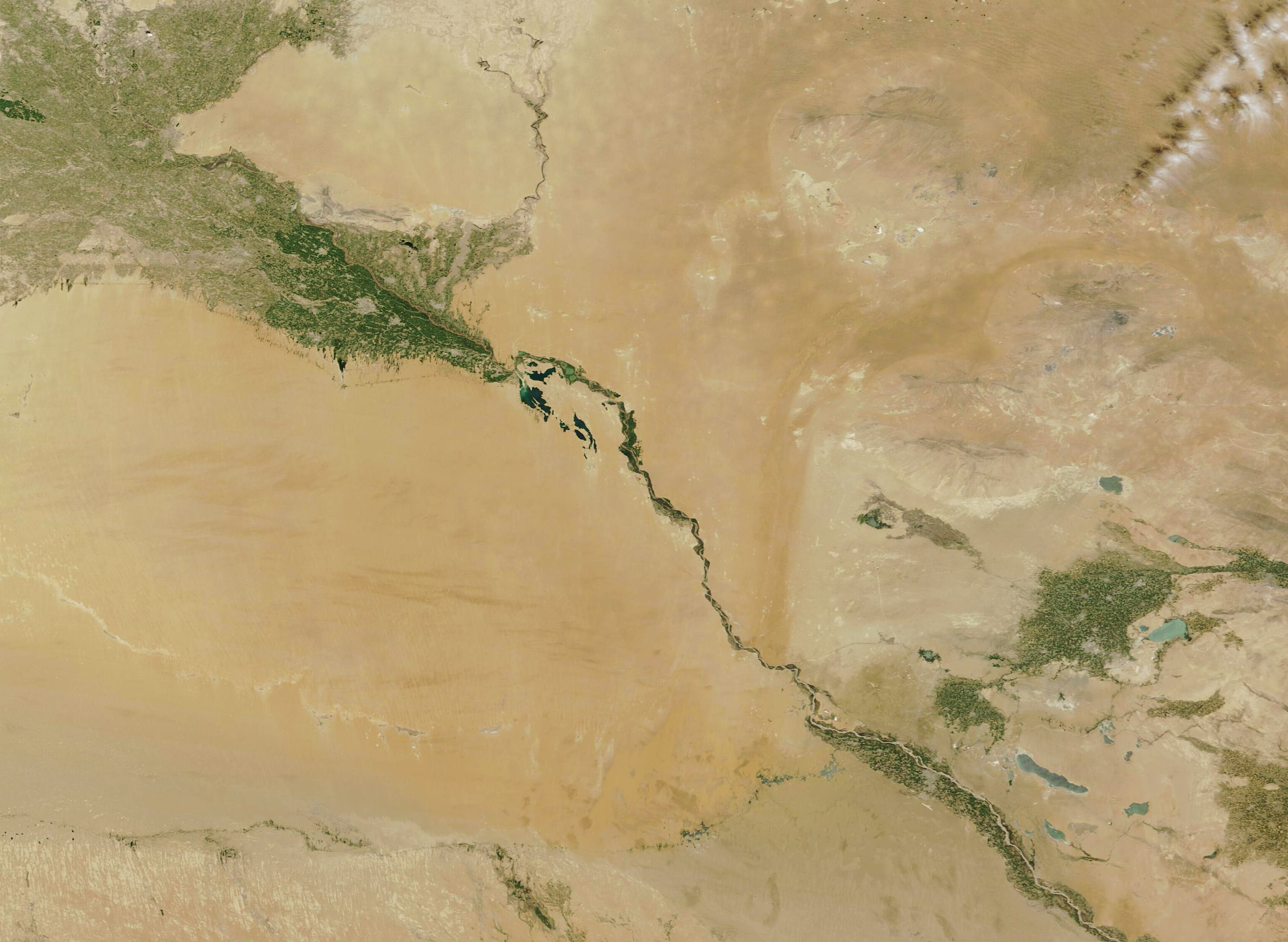

Bukhara Oasis (Uzbek: Buxoro vohasi) is a fertile area in the south-eastern part of Uzbekistan formed by the Zerafshan River. The oasis is heavily populated and Bukhara is the largest city.

The oasis has been inhabited for at least two and a half millennia. After becoming a part of the Silk Road, Bukhara Oasis' influence grew over its neighbours. It was conquered by Arabs in the 9th century.

As of 2019, approximately 1.2 million people live in the oasis while the area of irrigation stretches to 2,300 km^{2} (570,000 acres).

== Geography ==
Bukhara Oasis is located in the south-east of Uzbekistan, near the smaller Qaraqol Oasis, on the alluvial plain formed by the meandering Zerafshan River.

The Oasis emerged at the Zerafshan River delta between two larger waterways, Syr Darya and Amu Darya; it divides two cultural regions: Mediterranean-Iranian and China. The northern reach of the oasis is framed by the Kouldouktou mountains, but the average altitudes of the oasis are low: 200 to 260 m above the sea level. It is bordered by the Qara Kum desert on the south and by Kyzylkum Desert on the north and occupied around 5,000 km^{2} (1,200,000 acres) of land. The channels of the Zerafshan River are very mobile, and human settlements moved with the channels over the centuries.

The Bukhara Oasis has an arid climate with only about 160 mm of annual precipitation, so Zerafshan was a crucial source of water for local residents. In the early 1970s the Amu-Bukhara canal started bringing water from the Amu Darya to the oasis. Within about a decade, Bukhara Oasis started experiencing waterlogging, water pollution, increasing soil salinity, and other hydrological problems. Since the Zerafshan channels in the western part of the oasis are more numerous and dense, this part has more human settlements compared to the rest of the oasis.

A study conducted by the Mission Archéologique Franco-Ouzbèke dans l'Oasis de Boukhara (MAFOUB) in late 2010s found eight channels that Zerafshan used to flow in, but later changed course. Melting of the glaciers after the Last Glacial Maximum along with possible earthquakes blocked the river several times; then the temporary dams would get broken by the mass of water gathered upstream, which created avulsions that destroyed all the human-made structures. Earliest human settlements located near the current channel appeared not earlier than the 3rd century BCE with earlier settlements located at the ends of the Zerafshan channels and around lacustrine areas.

== History ==
=== Earliest settlement ===
From 3rd century BCE to the 16th century CE, over 1,000 settlements have been identified in the oasis, mostly associated with the tepe. Shishkin identified two types of tepe: a "monolithic" type with walls but no citadel, and a "two-level" type with a citadel and a shahrestan. The survey led by Chiara Silvi Antonini developed a much more detailed typology, which the MAFOUB abandoned in favour of a simpler classification: 1) cities with a citadel, a shahrestan and a rabad; 2) cities with a citadel and a shahrestan only; 3) cities with a unique mound, such as mills, caravanserais, or kurgans; 4) open sites such as ceramic distribution zones, production zones etc. The tripartite cities with a citadel, a shahrestan and a rabad are the most stable ones, appearing in the 2nd to 3rd century BCE (surrounding suburbs start appearing in the 5th century CE) and lasting at least until the Mongol and Timurid periods in the 13–15th centuries.

During the Neolithic era, humans lived in the south-western part of the oasis and in the east, near an old channel of Kashka Darya; during Bronze Age, people inhabited the south-western and western areas; however, no artifacts from this period remain. The central part of the oasis was likely an uninhabitable marshland at this time.

=== First modern settlements ===
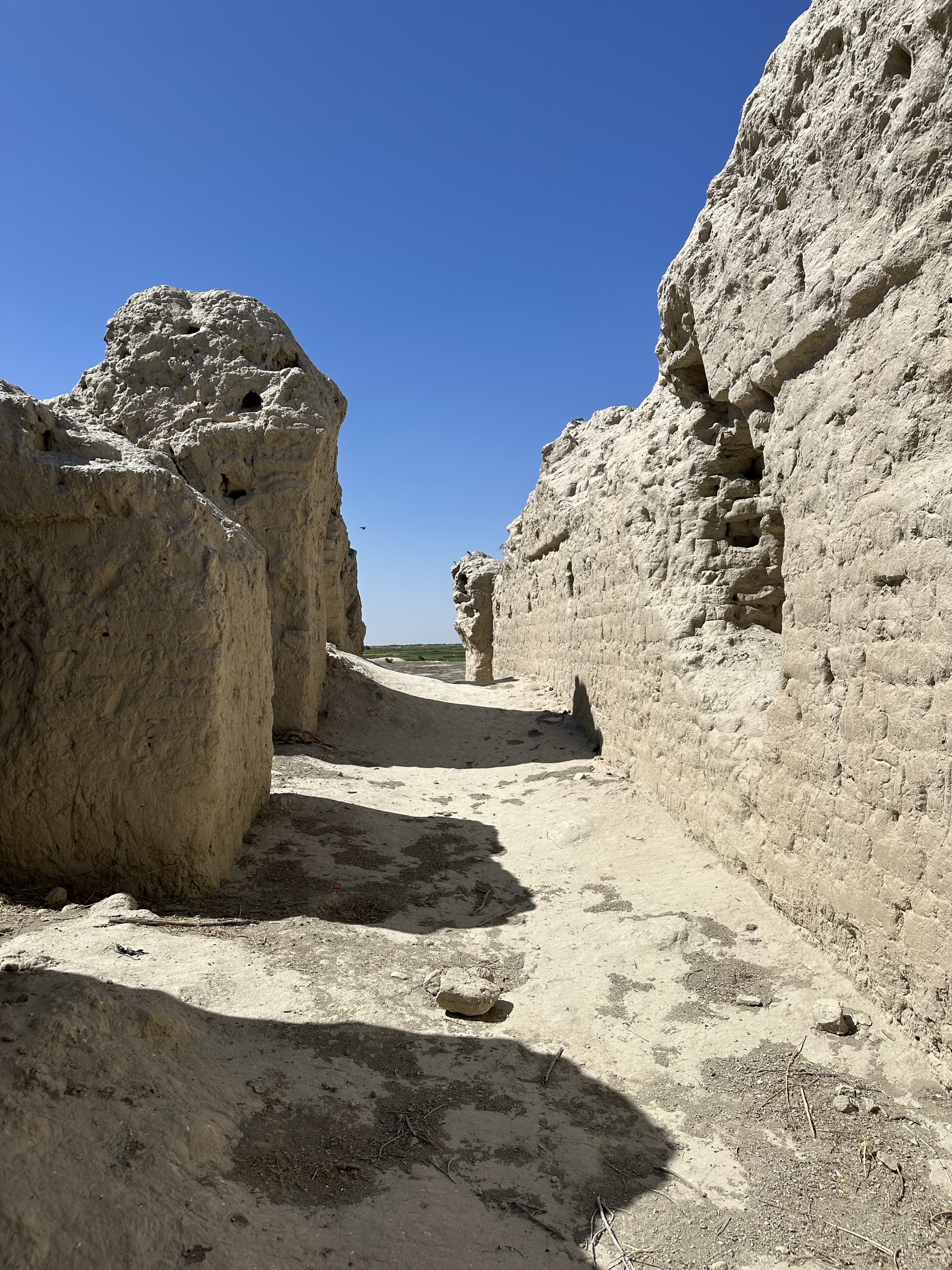
Excavations in Varakhsha, founded in the 1st century BCE

After Zerafshan's last change in course in the 3rd to 2nd century BCE, the first modern settlement of Paykend appeared. It was not alone: several modern settlements developed fortifications by 3—1 century BCE; they likely evolved from earlier hamlets that had no walls. Most of them are located close to a water source with the Sivanj settlement being a rare exception: it probably drew its water from artificial canals leading to Romitan.

Bukhara Oasis is included in the caravan network of the Silk Road starting from the 4th century BCE, but it was not an active member of the trade network until the end of the 1st century BCE, possibly because of the lack of pasture for the animals, unlike the road through Bactria to the south.

=== Rise of Bukhara ===
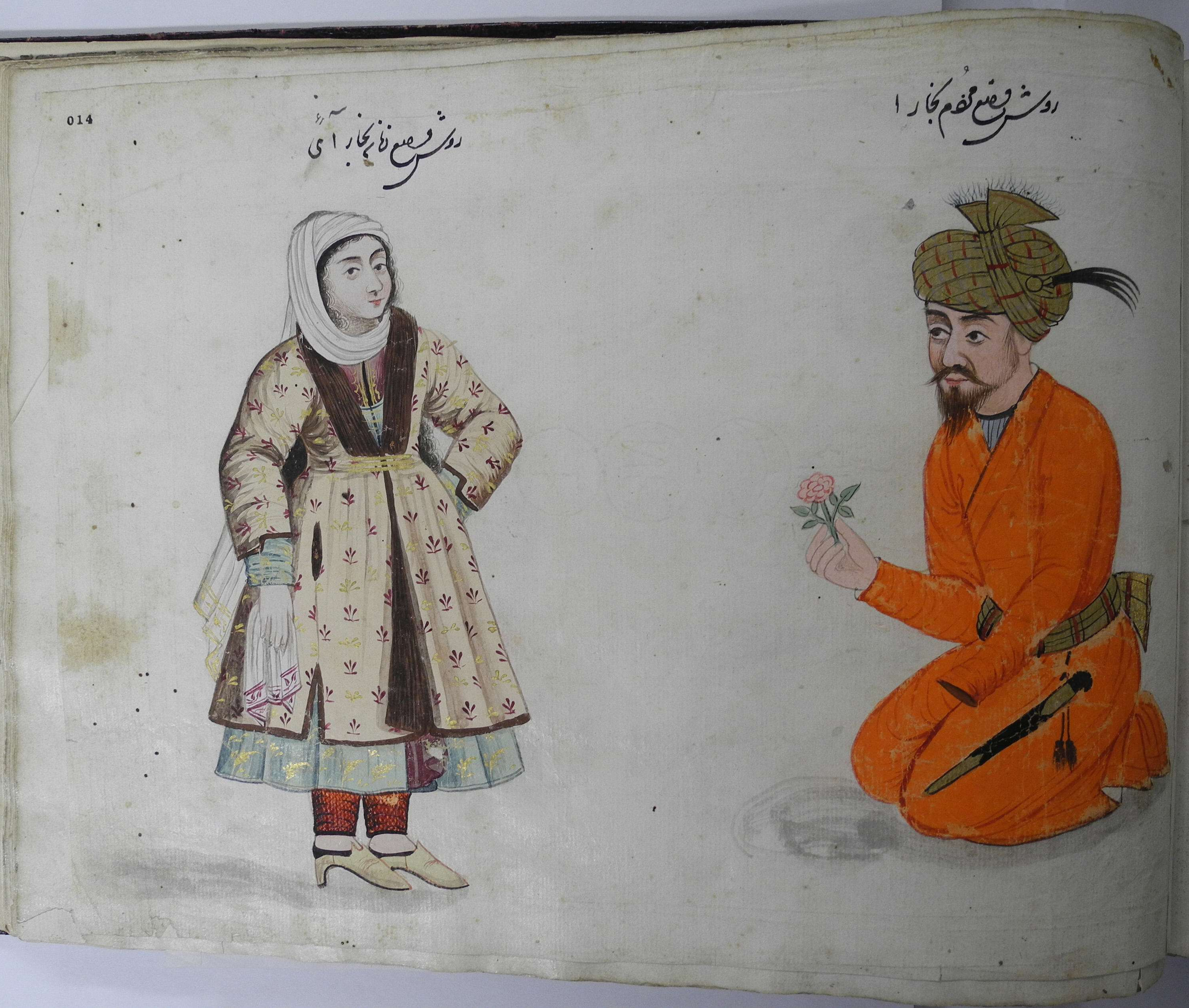
A portrait of a woman and a man from Bukhara; 17 century

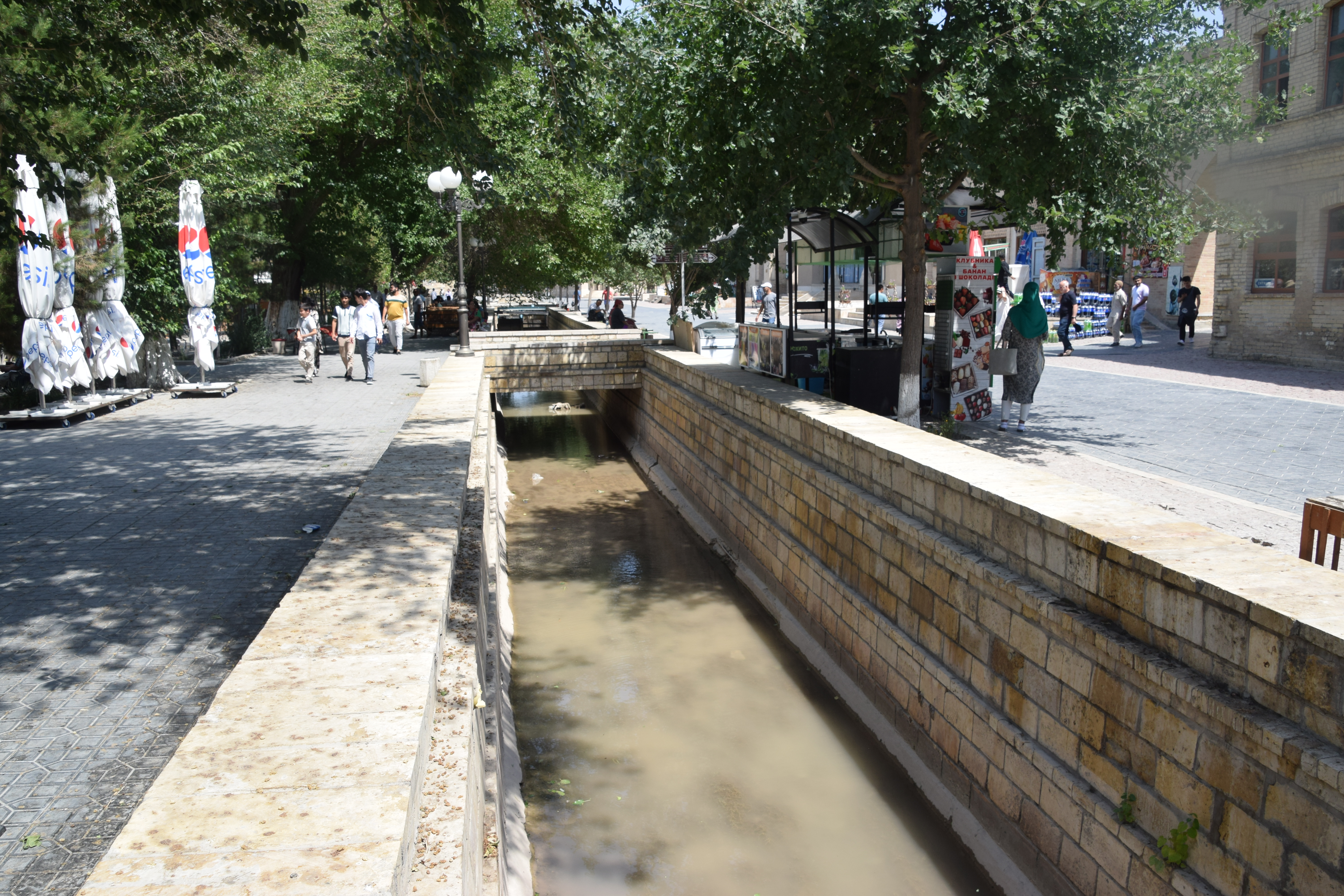
Water management remains an ongoing issue in Bukhara

By the 1st through 3rd centuries CE, the earliest settlements acquired citadels and shahrestans while many smaller others appeared near them. The reason for this urbanisation and efforts to protect the settlements was the rise of Sogdia and Chach, which used to be vassals of the nomadic Kangju kingdom; Bukhara Oasis was a part of Sogdia. At this point, Bukhara became the main settlement in the oasis. After that and until the early 8th century the population of the oasis grew exponentially. Its strategic location along the north-eastern part of the Silk Road facilitated a massive resettlement of people, especially from the north-east. A new type of ceramics appeared: starting from the 3rd century, Kaunchi pottery is found in the oasis.

In the early 7th century, the first textual mention of Bukhara appeared in Arabic sources after the collapse of the Hephthalite Empire. Al-Tabari mentioned a "lord of Varakhsha" who became "the king of Bukhara" (that is, the whole oasis) for a short time right before the Arabic invasion in the 9th century. The Muslim conquest of Transoxiana began the Islamic period in the history of the oasis, which is characterised by resettlement of depopulated places and temporary or permanent abandonment of established cities such as Ramitan (later repopulated) and Varakhsha (last ceramics found there are dated to the 13th century). These cities also exemplify the main reasons for the population decline: the washing out of the mud brick structures (Ramitan) and instabilities with water supply (Varakhsha). The population changes ended in the 15th through 16th centuries: settlements such as Kakishtuvan, Barkad, Pinjan and Iskijkat, which had no access to water, were abandoned; later the ancient tepe of Bukhara, Gijduvon and Vobkent were swallowed by new buildings. Bukhara, previously being associated with the oasis, became synonymous with its metropoly.

== Surveys and expeditions ==
The first systematic investigation of the Bukhara Oasis was conducted by a team led by a Russian diplomat Alexander Fedorovich Negri in 1820s; it included cartographers, a doctor and a naturalist. British diplomat Alexander Burnes contributed to the study of the Oasis by making archaeological notes during his visit in the late 1820s. An expedition conducted by the military topographer N. S. Sitnjakovskij in 1896 recorded a lot of information on the oasis' management. Investigations led by Leonid Aleksandrovich Zimin in 1913–1915 were mostly concerned with the Paykend region, but provided some data about other parts of the oasis as well. Starting from the 1930s, researchers became increasingly interested in Bukhara Oasis' archaeology while their investigations became more thorough.

After the territory of the oasis was acquired by the USSR, Soviet authorities launched several surveys with teams of scientists studying the oasis region; the most important ones were conducted by Shishkin (1937), Mukhamedjanov (1975, 1978), Guliamov, Islamov and Askarov (1966); another major study of the oasis' monuments was organised by the USSR Archaeological Institute in 1985.

As for the studies conducted in the independent Uzbekistan, Shukhrat Adilov (2006) surveyed the hydrography of the region while several Italian expeditions published materials from local excavations.

== See also ==
- Gurgānj Dam
