= Zambar (river) =

Location
- Country: Tajikistan

Physical characteristics
- Mouth: Karatag
  - coordinates: 38.8876°N 68.3442°E

Basin features
- Progression: Karatag→ Surxondaryo→ Amu Darya→ Aral Sea

The Zambar (Russian: Замбар) is a river of the Gissar Range in northern Tajikistan. It is a left tributary of the Karatag. In the upper valley of the river, 2800–3200 metres, there are range of kars and glacial lakes. The mountainside of the valley is said to be "concave with wide bottom and four visible ancient mountain ridges" and the Zambar valley "converges to V-form below with a longitudinal slope greatly rising". The river course is turbulent, with numerous rocky ledges and waterfalls.
