= Karatag =

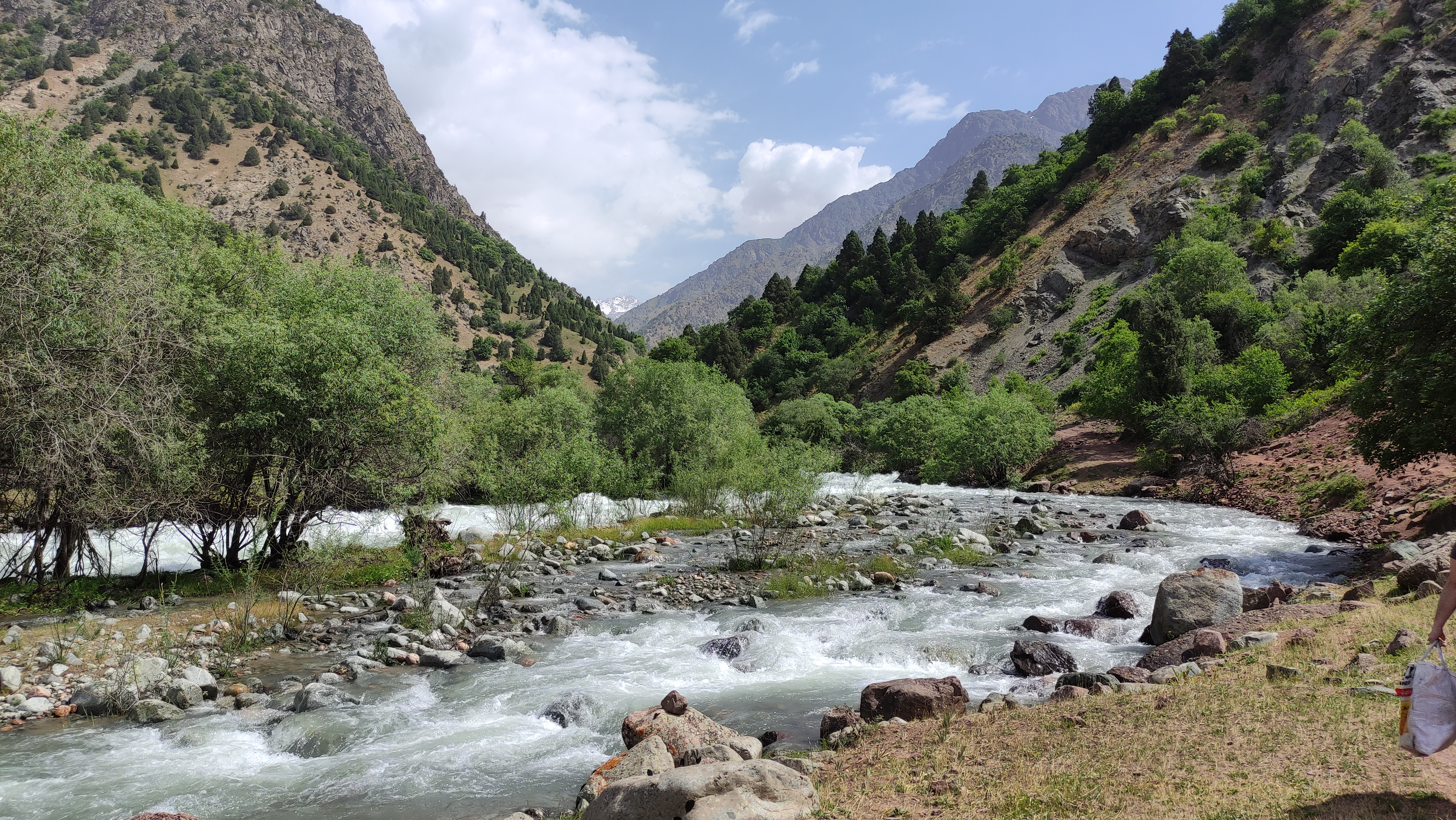

Location
- Country: Tajikistan, Uzbekistan

Physical characteristics
- Mouth: Surxondaryo
  - coordinates: 38.3124°N 68.0118°E
- Length: 112 km (70 mi)

Basin features
- Progression: Surxondaryo→ Amu Darya→ Aral Sea
- Tributaries
  - left: Zambar, Payron

The Karatag or Qaratogh, Qaratoghdaryo (Russian: Каратаг) is a river of northwestern Tajikistan and eastern Uzbekistan. It flows through Shirkent National Park and flows down the south slopes of the Hisar mountain range. At its confluence with the Toʻpolondaryo, the Surxondaryo is formed. The river is 112 kilometres (70 mi) long. Large seismic landslides occur in the river basin and it also contains several glacial lakes. Upstream from the confluence with the Payron, the Karatag is called Diakhandara. Another tributary is the Zambar. The Diakhandara Glacier, which fed the upper course of the Karatag, has fully melted.
