= Sherobod (river) =

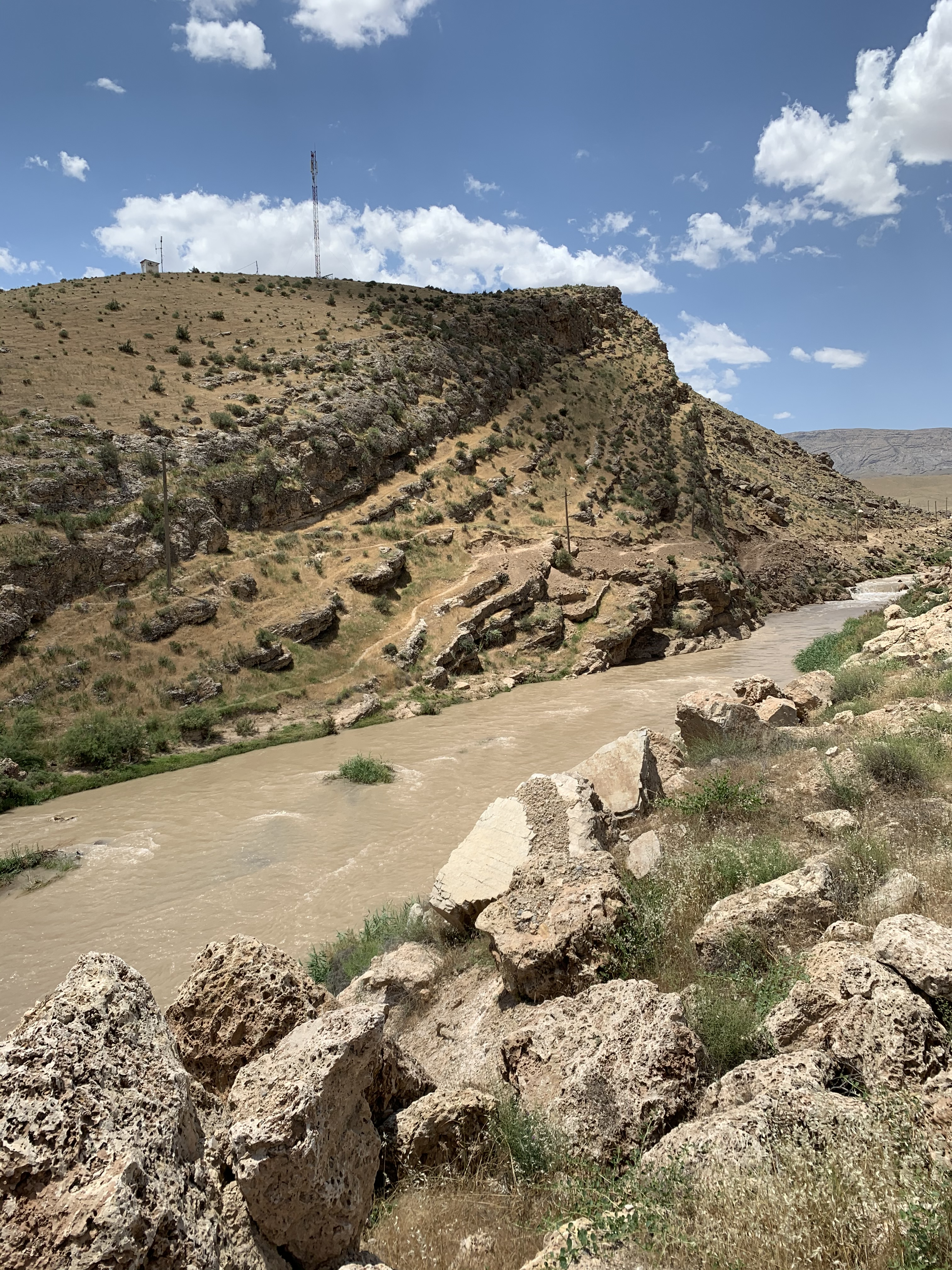
- Sherabad river near Sisanga village

Location
- Country: Uzbekistan

Physical characteristics
- Mouth: Amu Darya
  - coordinates: 37.3772°N 67.0007°E
- Length: 177 km (110 mi)
- Basin size: 2,950 km^{2} (1,140 sq mi)

Basin features
- Progression: Amu Darya→ Aral Sea

The Sherobod, Sherabad or Sheroboddaryo (Uzbek: Sheroboddaryo, Russian: Шерабад) is a right tributary of the Amu Darya in the Surxondaryo Region, southern Uzbekistan. It is about 177 kilometres (110 mi) long and drains an area of 2,950 square kilometres (1,140 mi^{2}). The river rises in the arid foothills of the Gissar Range and flows south through steppe before flowing through a mountain ridge to empty into the Central Asian plain near the city Sherobod. The river turns south and flows past Qorasuv, to flow into the Amu Darya near the village Shurab. Because of irrigation water use, most of the water in the Sherabad no longer reaches the Amu Darya and its eventual destination in the Aral Sea. After flowing out of the mountains the remaining water in the river is usually salty so it is unsuitable for further water use. In dry years, most of the river dries up before reaching the Amu Darya.

== Etymology ==
The name is a Persian/Tajiki compound made of 'sher' or 'shir' for 'lion', 'abad/obod' for English 'village, city' and 'darya/daryo' for a large river or sea.

== See also ==
- Surkhan Darya
- Termez
