= Transcaspian Canal =

Proposed canal in Asia

The Transcaspian Canal (Russian: Транскаспийский канал) was a proposed canal to divert the Amu Darya River from the Aral Sea and into the Caspian Sea. It was first proposed by Tsarist engineers and later considered by Soviet officials. Proponents argued that the project would return the Amu Darya into its supposed old bed.

Several other similar proposals were made in the early 20th century, including a Kazakh-Turkestan Canal to connect Kazakhstan with the Black Sea. The projects were not seriously considered after the late-1920s, when a campaign was launched to ridicule "fantastic" hydraulic projects. In 1928, over a dozen hydraulic engineers operating in Central Asia were tried for mismanaging the irrigation system and "devising intentionally fantastic projects".

== Proposals ==
Following the Russian conquest of Central Asia, multiple suggestions were put forward for the construction of a transcaspian canal. Those who supported the project had Orientalist views and believed it would return "the [Khivan] oasis to cultured life".

=== Glukhovskoi's proposals ===
Among the initial proposals was one presented by Aleksandr Glukhovskoi in 1868. He argued that such a canal would allow ships sailing down the Volga to reach Tashkent via Bukhara. His proposal was backed by the Ministry of Transport of the Russian empire.

Many of Glukhovskoi's original reports and proposals were lost during the Russian Civil War and a 1924 flood. In June 1925, the Water Section of the State Planning Committee discussed the project. Among the plans considered was one made by Gluvoskoi in 1893.

=== Rizenkampf's proposals ===
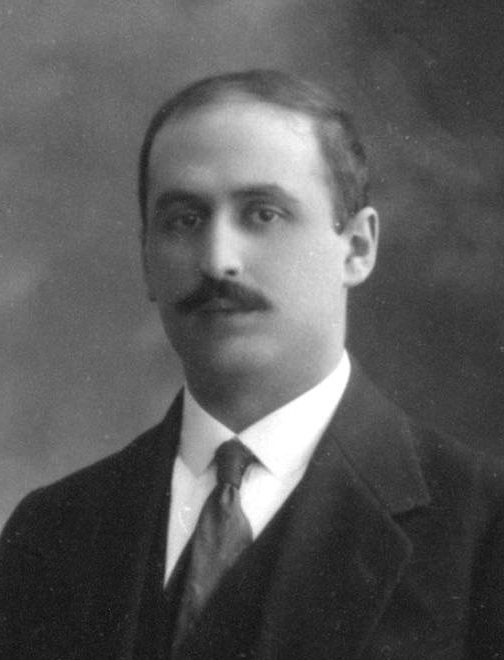
Rizenkampf (1886–1943) was one of the most ardent supporters of building a transcaspian canal

After the October Revolution, Georgii Rizenkampf (German: Georgi Riesenkampff) proposed to build a 1,600-km (1,500-verst) canal stretching from the upper reaches of the Amu Darya in Afghanistan through the Karakum Desert in Turkmenistan all the way to the Caspian sea. In his 1921 book entitled "Trans-Kaspiiskii kanal (Problema orosheniia Zakaspiia)" (Russian: Транс-Каспийский канал (Проблема орошения Закаспия)), Rizenkampf argued that the canal would support the growing of cotton in the region. He predicted cotton would become the "fulcrum of life in Transcaspia".

== Criticism ==
By the late 1920s, a media campaign was launched to ridicule large water diversion projects in Central Asia. In February and March 1928, 23 hydraulic engineers and water managers working in Central Asia, including those who had proposed a transcaspian canal, were tried in Tashkent. At the time the London Times reported that "Until recently the authorities in Moscow boasted of these 'fantastic projects,' but now apparently they need scapegoats to mollify the native population." Historian Maya K. Peterson similarly argued that the trial was aimed to "distract from Soviet failings and find scapegoats".

== See also ==
- Eurasia Canal
