= Gurgānj Dam =

Central Asian water-engineering project (~985–April 1221)

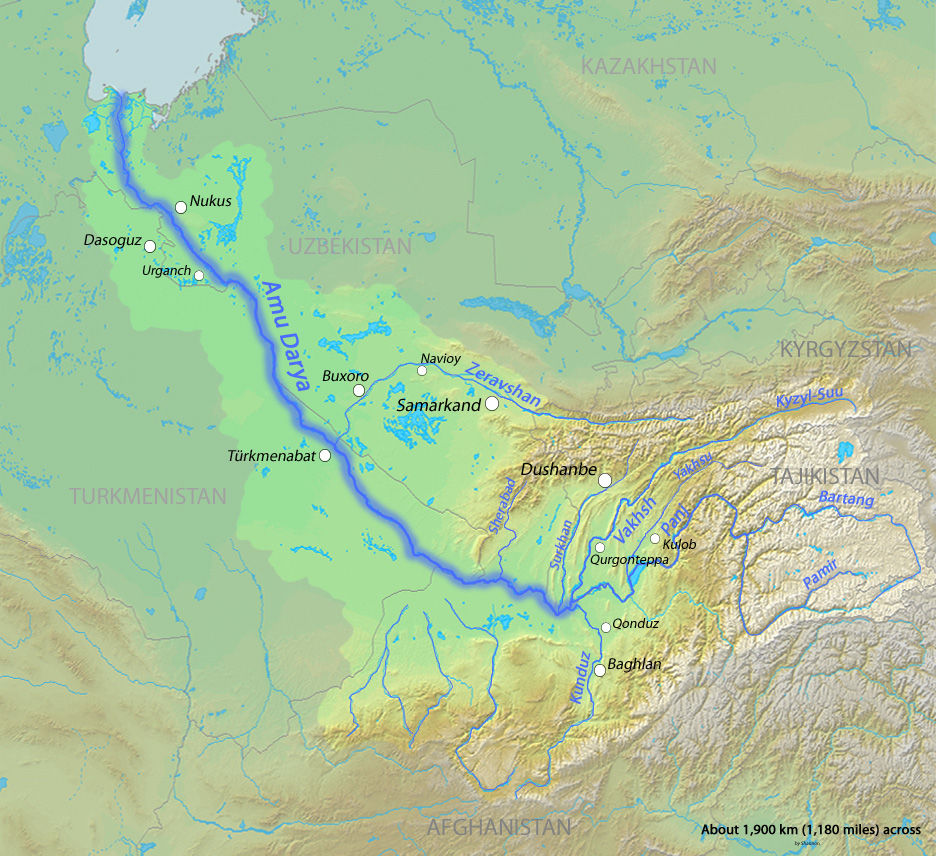
Historic cities of the Amu Darya watershed including Gurgānj (Urgench)

The Gurgānj Dam was a major water engineering project of medieval-era Central Asia. The dam was constructed on the Amu Darya (Oxus) river, near what is now called Konye-Urgench ("Old Gurgānj") in northern Turkmenistan. It was destroyed in 1221 by the troops of Genghis Khan and began to flow into Sarygamysh Lake.

== History ==
The dam stood from about 985 to April 1221, when it was destroyed following the Siege of Gurganj during the Mongol invasion of Khorasan. While it stood, the wickerwork dam was located about a mile upstream from the town. The dam diverted the flow of the previously forked river entirely to the Aral Sea.

Our knowledge of the dam comes from both al-Biruni and Yakut. The dam had gates that controlled the flow of water, much like other dams of the same period throughout Central Asia, such as the one on the Zarafshon river at Afrasiyab. The dam was just one part of the city's waterworks, which included irrigation canals watering expansive agricultural fields. The irrigation or "trunk" channels went to and throughout the city and agricultural areas. The channels were dug deeper and deeper to reduce the surface area exposed to the sun and lined with clay to avoid seepage.

Destroying the dam washed away the city, the entire metropolitan area, and any surviving residents, which contributed to the overall death toll from the conquest period of the Mongol Empire. The destruction of the dam changed the course of the Oxus towards Sarygamysh Lake; it is believed that this contributed to the recession of the Aral Sea in the medieval period, although this is disputed.

== See also ==
- Oasis of Bukhara
- Khwarazm – Oasis region in Central Asia
