= Amu-Bukhara Canal =

Pumped irrigation canal in Uzbekistan

- Country: Uzbekistan, Turkmenistan

Specifications
- Status: Open

History
- Date completed: 1965 (first stage)

Geography
- Start point: Amu Darya
- End point: Bukhara Oasis

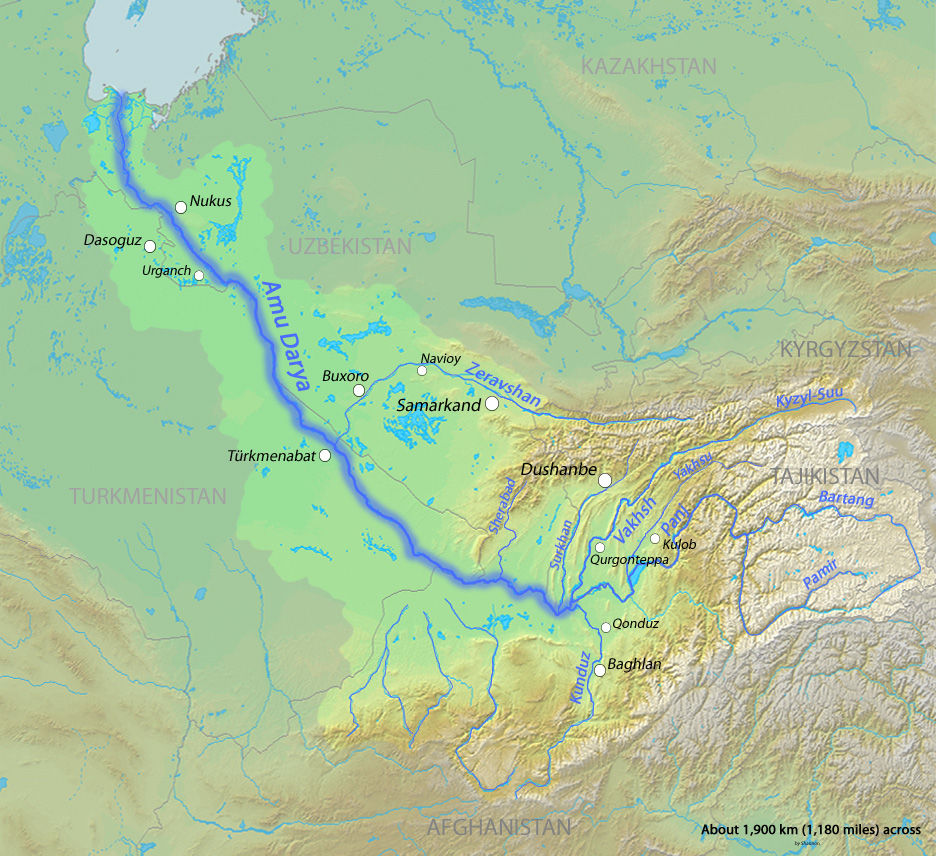
The Amu Darya basin. The canal draws water from the river's right bank and carries it to the Bukhara Oasis.

The Amu-Bukhara Canal (Uzbek: Amu-Buxoro mashina kanali) is a pumped irrigation canal in Uzbekistan. It lifts water from the Amu Darya about 64 metres (210 ft) and carries it across the desert to the Bukhara and Navoiy regions. It was built because the Zarafshan no longer supplied enough water to the Bukhara Oasis. It irrigates about 250,000 hectares (620,000 acres).

== Background ==
Until the 1960s the Bukhara Oasis was irrigated almost entirely by the Zarafshan. As irrigated farming expanded along the river's upper and middle reaches, including in Samarkand Region, less water reached Bukhara. By the early 1960s the oasis was short 50 to 55 percent of its annual water requirement. To solve this, a canal was built to bring water across the desert from the Amu Darya, the largest river in Central Asia.

== Construction ==
Construction began in 1959 and was carried out in stages. The related Amu-Karakul canal, which first brought Amu Darya water to Bukhara Region, was built in the early 1960s. The first stage of the Amu-Bukhara Canal was 197 km long. A second stage followed, and its Khamza-II pumping station was commissioned in 1974. Abdullaev dates the completion of the canal to the early 1970s.

== Route and operation ==
The canal begins at an intake on the right bank of the Amu Darya near Farab in Turkmenistan. It crosses into Bukhara Region and runs through the Olot and Qorovulbozor districts.

The canal uses about 4.58 billion cubic metres of water a year, roughly half of the amount Uzbekistan may take from the Amu Darya under international agreements. Its pumping stations consume about 1,300 GWh of electricity a year. Across Uzbekistan, pump irrigation accounts for about 20 percent of the country's electricity use.

== Rehabilitation ==
After Uzbekistan's independence, much of the canal's infrastructure, built in the 1960s and 1970s, began to deteriorate. In 2007 the OPEC Fund for International Development lent $15 million to replace the failing Kuyu Mazar pumping station, which served about 30,000 hectares.

A larger rehabilitation project began in the mid-2010s. A presidential decree of 25 August 2015 approved a project worth more than $400 million, funded jointly by the Asian Development Bank and the Japan International Cooperation Agency. It included a new Amu-Bukhara-1 pumping station and the rehabilitation of the Khamza-II, Kuyu Mazar, Kizil Tepa and Kizil Tepa auxiliary stations. The project aimed to give farmers a more reliable water supply and to reduce the system's electricity use.

== Environmental effects ==
Much of the canal is unlined, so large amounts of water seep into the surrounding ground every year. This has raised groundwater levels near the canal, especially in Olot district. The higher water table has caused waterlogging of farmland and secondary soil salinization. These problems were already apparent by the end of the 1980s, and in the Bukhara Oasis waterlogging and salinity reduced the productivity of irrigated farming.
