= Xinjiang Central Asia Petroleum and Gas Company =

Chinese oil and gas company

The Xinjiang Central Asia Petroleum and Gas Company (aka CAPEIC) extracts liquid resources from the Earth's crust. It is based in the People's Republic of China. In January 2023, it signed a $540 million three-year investment deal with the Taliban government of Afghanistan for extraction at Amu Darya basin, which forms a natural frontier between Afghanistan, Turkmenistan, Tajikistan, and Uzbekistan.

== History ==
The January 2023 Amu Darya deal was the first major public commodities' extraction signed by the Taliban government with an international organization since taking power in 2021. The project will provide employment for more than 3,000 Afghanis. Deputy Prime Minister for Economic Affairs Abdul Ghani Baradar said at the time, "In addition to other minerals, oil is the wealth of the Afghan people on which the economy of the country can rely." The ceremony was attended by the Chinese ambassador, Wang Yu, and the acting minister of mines and petroleum Shahabuddin Delawar. The contract is valid for 25 years. The Taliban will earn a 15% royalty and CAPEIC will build the country's first crude oil refinery. The Chinese company PetroChina sees Amu Darya as the third-largest potential gas field in the world. The deal collapsed in 2025 when the contract was terminated, two years after it was signed.
