= Diakhandara Glacier =

Glacier in Tajikistan

Diakhandara Glacier was a glacier situated on the south slope of the Gissar Range in the Pamir Mountains of northern Tajikistan. It fed the upper course of the river Karatag. The glacier was first observed on 18 August, 1940, and the first investigation of the glacier was made in 1958, which discovered it to be completely covered in moraines. As of 2014, it has fully melted.
