= Tuyamuyun Hydro Complex =

THC Main Dam
- Location within Uzbekistan
- Official name: Tuyamuyun Hydroengineering Complex
- Country: Uzbekistan/Turkmenistan
- Location: Turtkul District, Republic of Karakalpakstan/Dasoguz, Lebap Region
- Coordinates: 41°12′48.14″N 61°24′18.76″E
- Purpose: Irrigation, power
- Status: Operational
- Construction began: 1969
- Opening date: 1983; 43 years ago

Dam and spillways
- Type of dam: Gravity
- Impounds: Amu Darya River
- Height: 25 m (82 ft)
- Length: 141 m (463 ft)

Reservoir
- Creates: Channel Reservoir
- Total capacity: 2,300,000,000 m^{3} (1,900,000 acre⋅ft)
- Surface area: 303 km^{2} (117 mi^{2})
- Maximum length: 102 km (63 mi)
- Normal elevation: 130 m (430 ft)

Power Station
- Commission date: 1983
- Turbines: 6 x 25 MW
- Installed capacity: 150 MW
- Annual generation: 571 GWh

The Tuyamuyun Hydro Complex (THC) is a system of four interconnected reservoirs and a series of canals on the lower Amu Darya River, bordering Uzbekistan and Turkmenistan. Its primary purpose is to provide water for irrigation in Xorazm, Karakalpakstan and Daşoguz regions of Uzbekistan, Turkmenistan and as far north as Kazakhstan. The complex is located about 74 km (46 mi) southeast of Urgench in Xorazm Region, Uzbekistan and about 2 km (1.2 mi) north of Gazojak in Lebap Region, Turkmenistan. It was constructed between 1969 and 1983. Aside from irrigation, the complex also provides water for industrial and municipal uses. A 150 MW power station on the main dam contains six 25 MW hydroelectric turbine-generators.

The main dam (THC Main Dam) is located on the Amu Darya, straddling the border of Uzbekistan and Turkmenistan. It is the center-piece of the complex. The main dam is a 141 m (463 ft) long and 25 m (82 ft) high gravity dam. It creates the Channel Reservoir which has a storage capacity of about 2,300,000,000 m^{3} (1,900,000 acre⋅ft) and length of 102 km (63 mi). Water from the Channel Reservoir can be fed into the adjacent Kaparas and Sultansanjar Reservoirs for later use. The Sultansanjar Reservoir is connected via a canal to the Koshbulak Reservoir which lies just east. When first completed, all four reservoirs had a capacity of about 7,800,000,000 m^{3} (6,300,000 acre⋅ft) but due to silt build-up, this had been reduced to about 6,700,000,000 m^{3} (5,400,000 acre⋅ft) by 2001.

A system of canals off the main dam supply a network of irrigation canals to the various regions for irrigation. Diversion of river water into these canals, along with similar diversions of water from the nearby Syr Darya River, has greatly contributed to the desiccation of most of the Aral Sea, an endorrheic lake basin. Prior to damming and diversion, the two rivers were the main sources of surface water that replenished the lake.
