= Kulduk-Too =

- Location within Kyrgyzstan

Highest point
- Elevation: 5,016 m (16,457 ft)
- Coordinates: 39°41′N 71°07′E

Dimensions
- Length: 31 km (19 mi)
- Width: 7–8 km (4.3–5.0 mi)

Naming
- Native name: Кулдук-Тоо (Kyrgyz)

Geography
- Country: Kyrgyzstan
- Region: Batken Region
- District: Batken District

Geology
- Formed by: shale, limestone, and conglomerate of Silurian and Carboniferous, and more rarely by granite and granodiorite

Kulduk-Too (Kyrgyz: Кулдук-Тоо) is a northern offspur of the Alay Range in the Batken Region of Kyrgyzstan. It is located between the valley of the river Sokh and that of its tributary Kojashkan. It stretches from west to east, south of the Aydarken depression, and is connected in the east with the Kuruk-say Range. The length of the range is 31 km (19 mi), its width is 7–8 km (4.3–5.0 mi). Its average height is 4,100–4,300 m (13,500–14,100 ft), and its highest point is 5,016 m (16,457 ft). The northern slope, long and gentle, gradually descends to Sokh river and Khaidarkan depression. The southern slope, short and steep, features great variations in altitudes. Both slopes are deeply dissected by tributaries of Sokh river. The range is composed of Silurian and Carboniferous rocks: (shale, limestone, and conglomerate) and more rarely by intrusive rock such as granite and granodiorite.
