= Surxondaryo (river) =

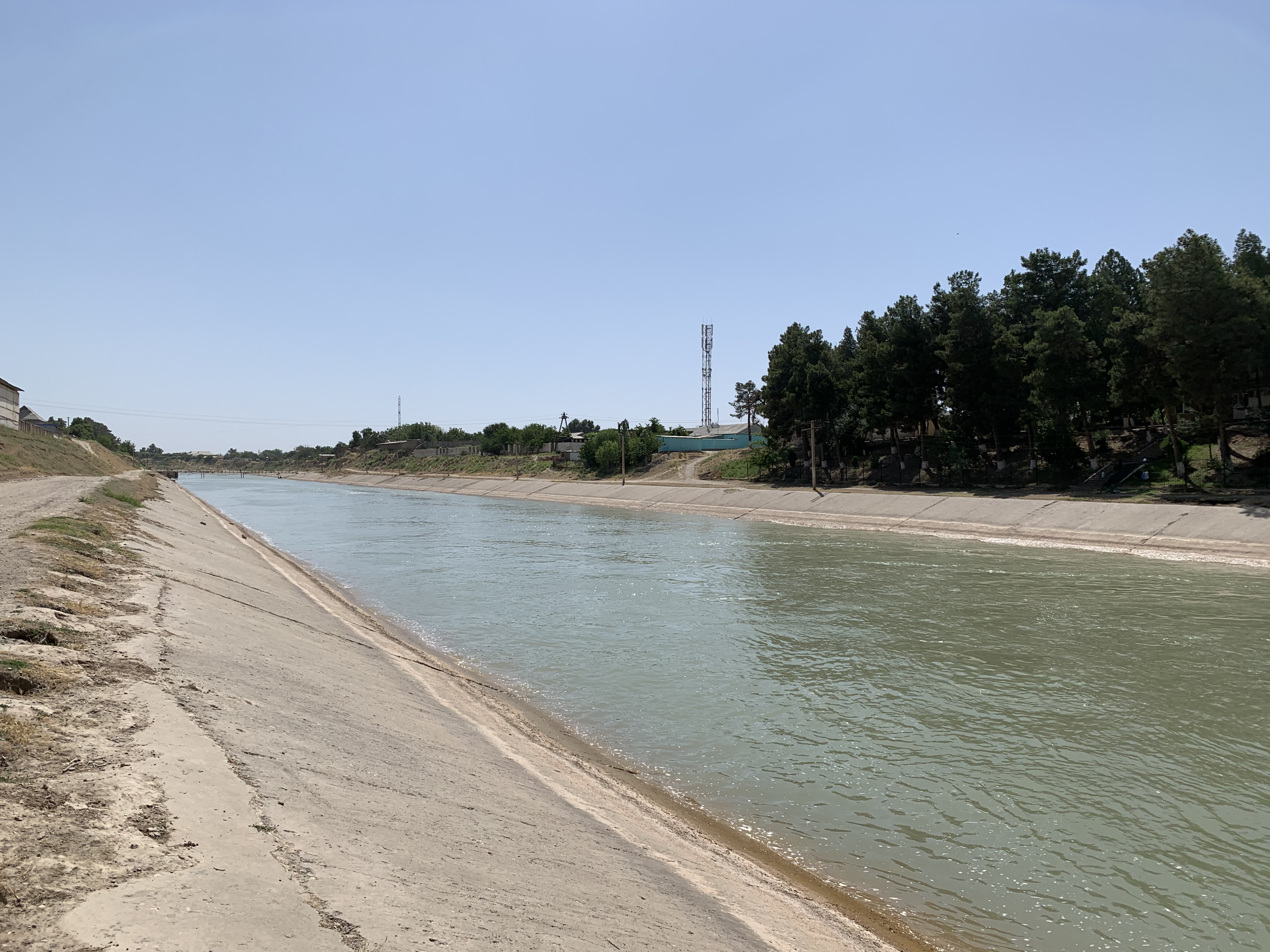
- Surkhandarya river after South Surkhan reservoir

Location
- Country: Uzbekistan

Physical characteristics
- Source: confluence of Toʻpolondaryo and Karatag
- Mouth: Amu Darya
  - coordinates: 37.3772°N 67.0007°E
- Length: 175 km (109 mi)
- Basin size: 13,500 km^{2} (5,200 sq mi)

Basin features
- Progression: Amu Darya→ Aral Sea

The Surxondaryo or Surkhandarya (Uzbek: Surxondaryo, Russian: Сурхандарья Surkhandarya) is a primary right tributary of the Amu Darya in Uzbekistan. It is formed at the confluence of the rivers Karatag and Toʻpolondaryo near the city Denov. It flows into the Amu Darya in the city Termez. The river is 175 kilometres (109 mi) long (287 km including its source river Karatag) and has a basin area of 13,500 square kilometres (5,200 mi^{2}).

It gives its name to the Surxondaryo Region.

== Flora and fauna ==
The natural habitat in area of the river Surxondaryo consists of tugai and reed forests, where the Caspian tiger occurred and abundant of deer and wild boar.
