= Amu Darya =

River in Central Asia

Amu Darya Oxus River
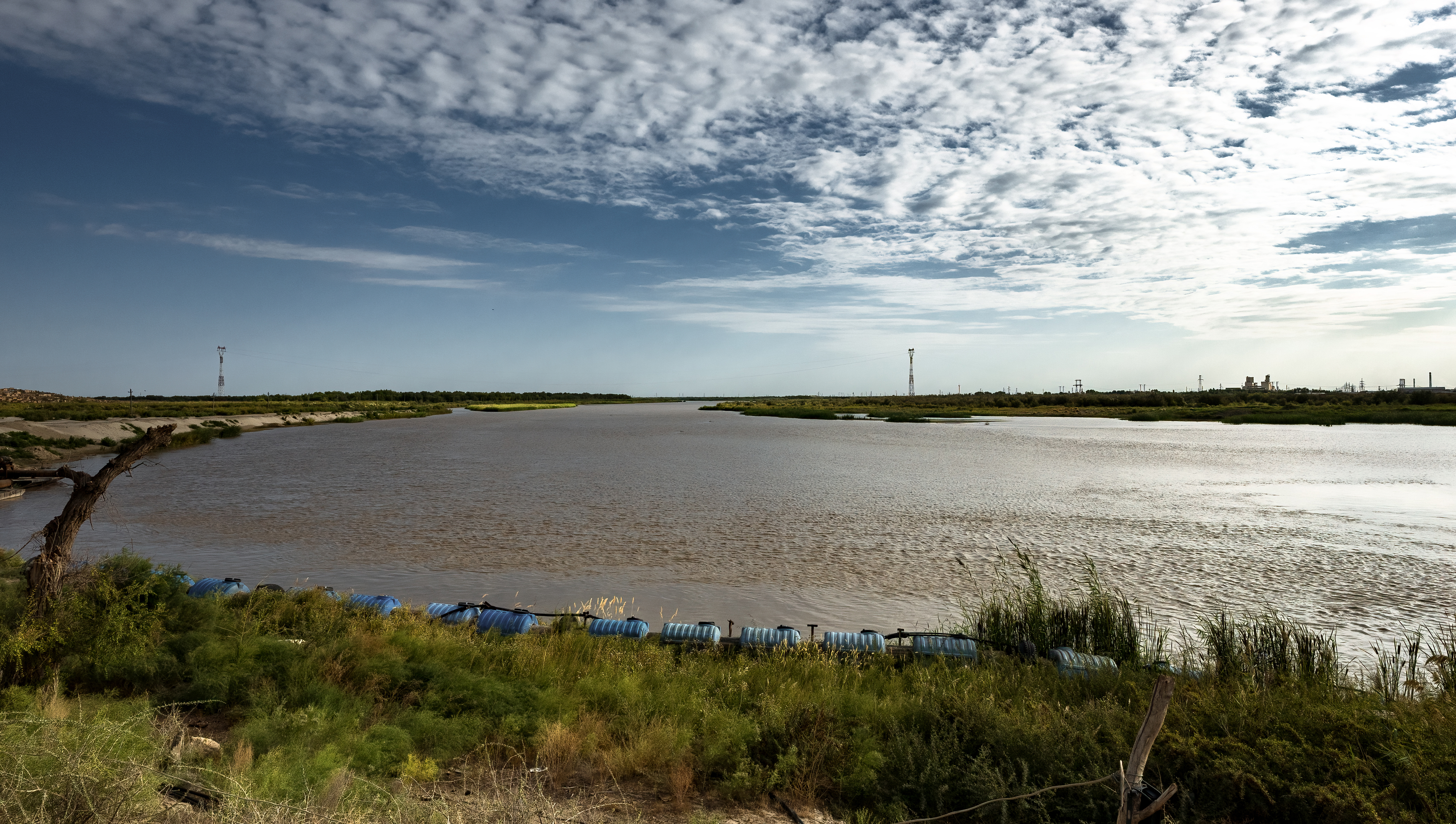
- Amu Darya at Nukus, Uzbekistan

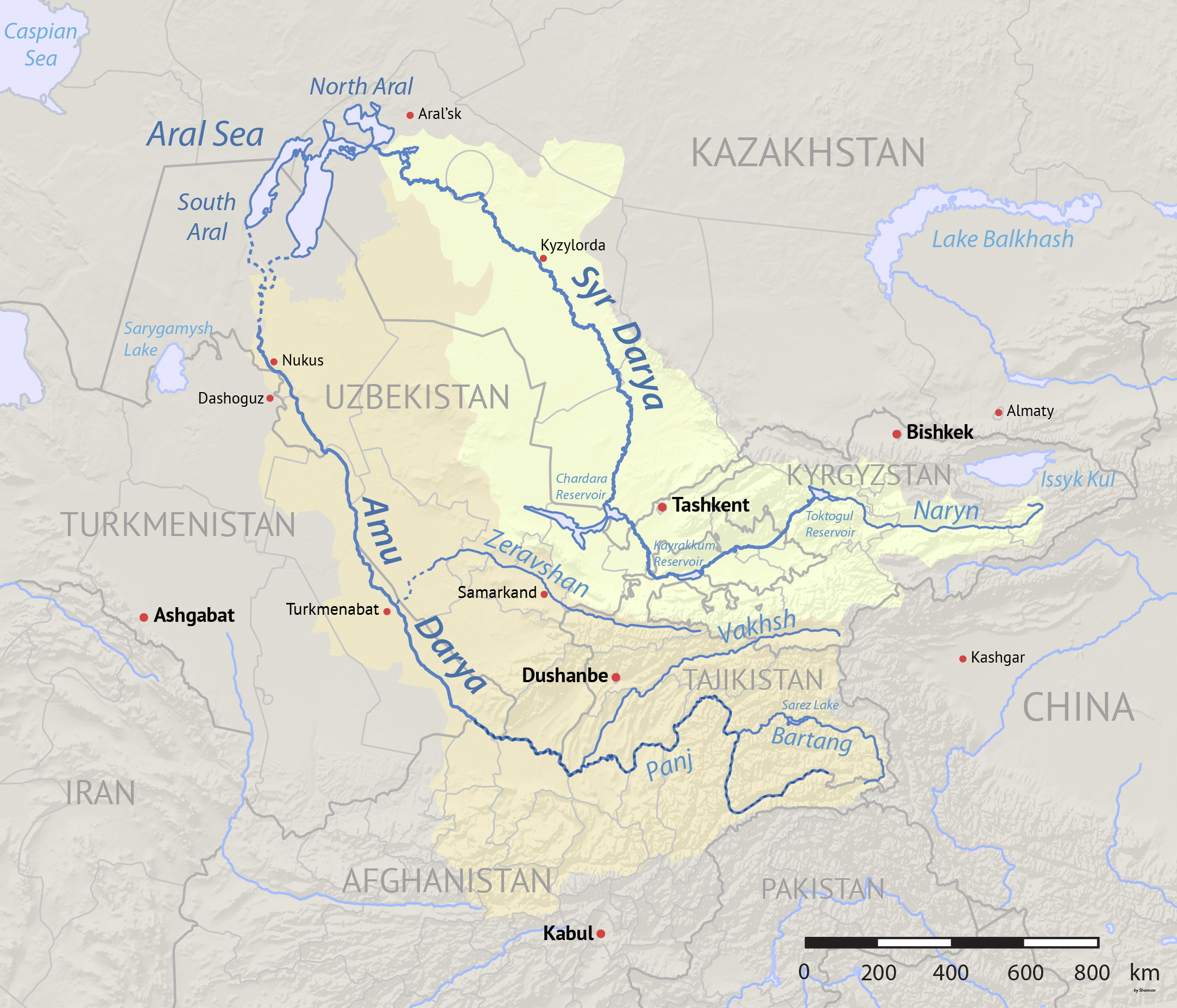
- Map of area around the Aral Sea. Aral Sea boundaries are c. 2008. The Amu Darya drainage basin is in orange, and the Syr Darya basin in yellow.
- Etymology: Named for the city of Amul (now Türkmenabat)
- Native name: Amudaryo (Uzbek); Амударё (Tajik); Amyderýa (Turkmen); د امو سیند (Pashto); آمودریا (Persian)

Location
- Countries: Afghanistan; Tajikistan; Turkmenistan; Uzbekistan
- Region: Central Asia

Physical characteristics
- Source: Pamir River/Panj River
  - location: Lake Zorkul, Pamir Mountains, Afghanistan/Tajikistan
  - coordinates: 37°27′04″N 73°34′21″E
  - elevation: 4,130 m (13,550 ft)
- 2nd source: Kyzylsu River/Vakhsh River
  - location: Alay Valley, Pamir Mountains, Tajikistan
  - coordinates: 39°13′27″N 72°55′26″E
  - elevation: 4,525 m (14,846 ft)
- Source confluence: Kerki
  - location: Tajikistan
  - coordinates: 37°06′35″N 68°18′44″E
  - elevation: 326 m (1,070 ft)
- Mouth: Aral Sea
  - location: Amudarya Delta, Uzbekistan
  - coordinates: 44°06′30″N 59°40′52″E
  - elevation: 28 m (92 ft)
- Length: 2,400 km (1,500 mi)
- Basin size: 534,739 km^{2} (206,464 sq mi)
- Discharge
  - average: 2,525 m^{3}/s (89,200 cu ft/s)
  - minimum: 420 m^{3}/s (15,000 cu ft/s)
  - maximum: 5,900 m^{3}/s (210,000 cu ft/s)

Basin features
- Tributaries
  - left: Panj River
  - right: Vakhsh River, Surkhan Darya, Sherabad River, Zeravshan River

The Amu Darya, (Note: English: /ˌɑːmuː ˈdɑːrjə/ AH-moo DAR-yə; Persian: آمو دریا, romanized: Âmu Daryâ, pronounced [ɒːˈmuː dæɹˈjɒː]; Dari: آمودریا, romanized: Āmū Daryā, pronounced [ɑˈmu d̪aɾˈjɑ]; Tajik: Амударё, romanized: Amudaryo, arabized: امودریا, hebraized: אמודריא, pronounced [ɐˌmu‿dɐrˈjɔ]; Turkmen: Amyderýa, cyrillized: Амыдеря, arabized: آمودریا, pronounced [ɑˌmɯdɑɾˈjɑ]; Uzbek: Amudaryo, cyrillized: Амударё, arabized: ئەمۇدەریا, pronounced [ɐˈmu dɐrˈjɒ]; Uyghur: ئامۇ دەرياسى, romanized: Amu Deryasi, cyrillized: Аму Дәряси, pronounced [amú tæ˞jasɯ́]; Karakalpak: Әмиўдәря, romanized: Ámiwdárya, arabized: أمۋدەريا, pronounced [æˌmʉwdærˈjɑ]; Kazakh: Әмудария, romanized: Ämudaria, arabized: أمۋدارىيا, pronounced [æmʉ́wd̥ærijɑ́]; Kyrgyz: Аму-Дарыя, romanized: Amu-Daryia, arabized: آمۇ-دارىيا, pronounced [ɑmútɑɾɯ̆jɑ́]; Pashto: د آمو سيند, romanized: də Āmū Sīnd, pronounced [d̪ə‿ɑˈmu sin̪d̪]; Arabic: جيحون, romanized: Jayḥūn, cyrillized: Гэйхьун, pronounced [d͡ʒajˈħuːn]; Russian: Амударья, romanized: Amudaria, pronounced [ɐˌmudɐrʲˈja]; Chinese: 阿姆河; pinyin: Āmǔ hé; Cantonese Yale: Amóuh hòh; Dungan: Амў хә) historically known as the Oxus, (Note: English: /ˈɒksəs/ OK-səs; Latin: Ōxus, pronounced [ˈoːksʊs]; Ancient Greek: Ὦξος, romanized: Ôxos, pronounced [ˈɔ̂ːksos]) is a major river in Central Asia which flows through Afghanistan, Tajikistan, Turkmenistan, and Uzbekistan. Rising in the Pamir Mountains, north of the Hindu Kush, the Amu Darya is formed by the confluence of the Vakhsh and Panj rivers, in the Tigrovaya Balka Nature Reserve on the border between Afghanistan and Tajikistan, and flows from there north-westwards into the southern remnants of the Aral Sea. However, today the Amu Darya does not reach the Aral Sea, and its mouth is in a dried-up area, of what was once the Aral Sea. In its upper course, the river forms part of Afghanistan's northern border with Tajikistan, Uzbekistan, and Turkmenistan. In ancient history, the river was regarded as the boundary of Greater Iran with Turan, which roughly corresponded to present-day Central Asia. The Amu Darya has a flow of about 70 cubic kilometres per year on average.

== Names ==
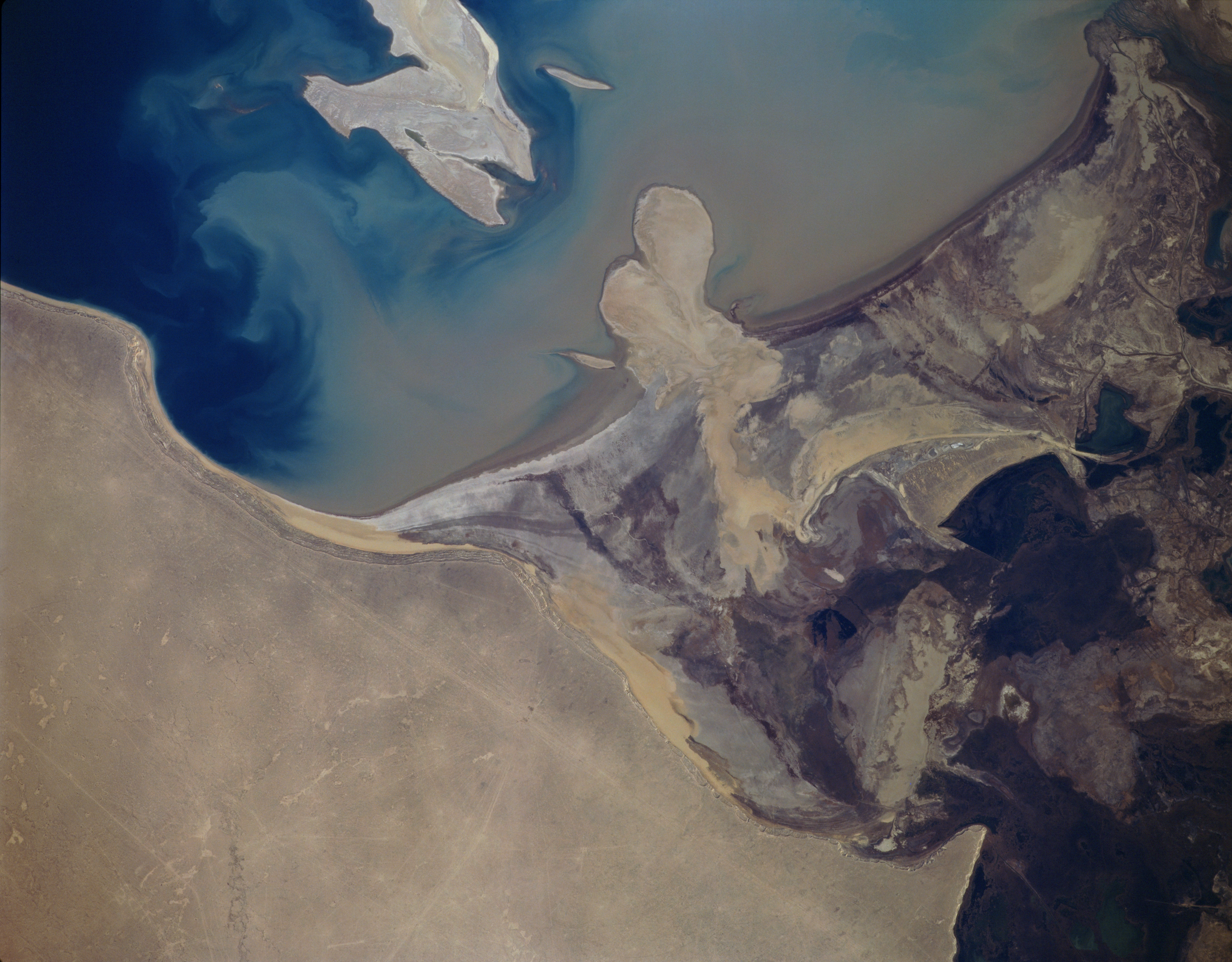
Amu Darya delta from space

In classical antiquity, the river was known as the Ōxus in Latin and Ὦξος (Ôxos) in Greek — a clear derivative of Vakhsh, the name of the largest tributary of the river. In Sanskrit texts, the river is also referred to as Vakṣu (वक्षु). The Brahmanda Purana refers to the river as Chaksu (चक्षु) which means 'an eye' in sanskrit. The Avestan texts too refer to the river as Yakhsha/Vakhsha (and Yakhsha Arta ('Upper Yakhsha'), referring to the Jaxartes/Syr Darya twin river to Amu Darya). In Middle Persian sources of the Sasanian period the river is known as Wehrōd (lit. 'good river').

The name Amu is said to have come from the medieval city of Āmul (later Chahar Joy/Charjunow, and now known as Türkmenabat) in modern Turkmenistan, with Daryā being the Persian word for 'lake' or 'sea'.

=== Identification with the Gihon ===
Medieval Arabic and Islamic sources call the river Jeyhoun (Arabic: جَيْحُون, romanized: Jayḥūn), which is derived from Gihon, the biblical name for one of the four rivers of the Garden of Eden. The Amu Darya passes through one of the world's highest deserts.

=== As the river Gozan ===
Western travelers in the 19th century mentioned that one of the names by which the river was known in Afghanistan was Gozan, and that this name was used by Greek, Mongol, Chinese, Persian, Jewish, and Afghan historians. However, this name is no longer used.

"Hara (Bokhara) and to the river of Gozan (that is to say, the Amu, (called the Oxus by Europeans )) ..."

"the Gozan River is the River Balkh, i.e. the Oxus or the Amu Darya ..."

"... and were brought into Halah (modern day Balkh), and Habor (which is Pesh Habor or Peshawar), and Hara (which is Herat), and to the river Gozan (which is the Ammoo, also called Jehoon) ..."

== Description ==
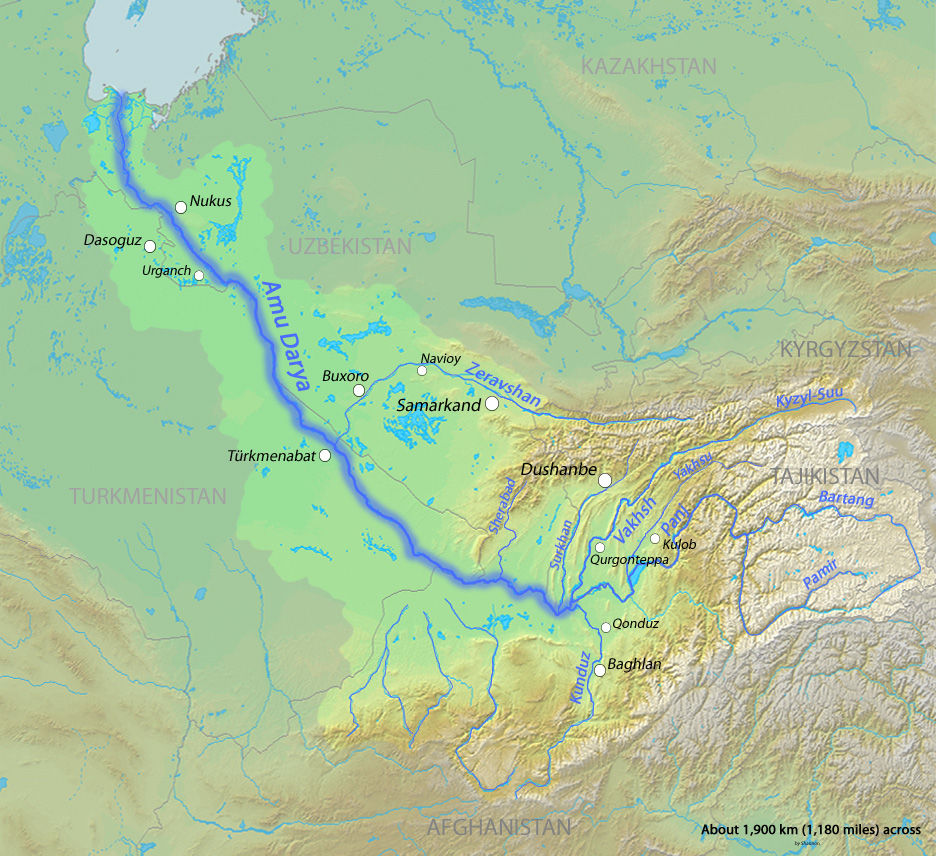
Map of the Amu Darya watershed

The river has a total length of 2,400 kilometres (1,500 mi), and its drainage basin covers 534,739 square kilometres (206,464 sq mi), providing a mean discharge of about 97.4 cubic kilometres (23.4 cu mi) of water per year. The river is navigable for over 1,450 kilometres (900 mi). All of the water comes from the high mountains in the south where annual precipitation can be over 1,000 mm (39 in). Even before large-scale irrigation began, high summer evaporation meant that not all of this discharge reached the Aral Sea – though there is some evidence the large Pamir glaciers provided enough meltwater for the Aral to overflow during the 13th and 14th centuries.

Since the end of the 19th century, there have been four different claimants as the true source of the Oxus:

- The Pamir River, which emerges from Lake Zorkul (once also known as Lake Victoria) in the Pamir Mountains (ancient Mount Imeon), and flows west to Qila-e Panja, where it joins the Wakhan River to form the Panj River.
- The Sarhad or Little Pamir River flowing down the Little Pamir in the High Wakhan
- Lake Chamaktin, which discharges to the east into the Aksu River, which in turn becomes the Murghab and then Bartang rivers, and which eventually joins the Panj Oxus branch 350 km downstream at Roshan Vomar in Tajikistan.
- An ice cave at the end of the Wakhjir valley, in the Wakhan Corridor, in the Pamir Mountains, near the border with Pakistan.

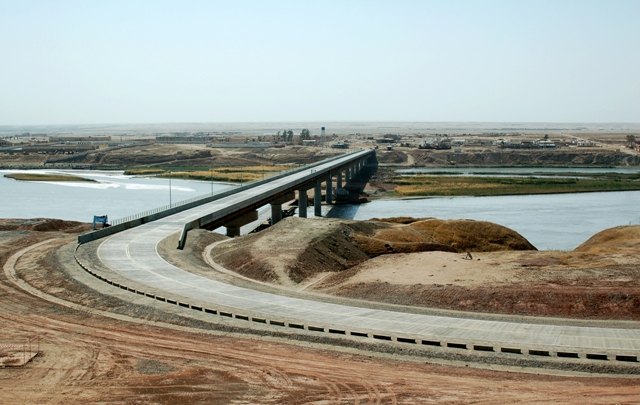
Afghanistan-Tajikistan bridge over the Amu Darya

A glacier turns into the Wakhjir River and joins the Wakhan River about 50 kilometres (31 mi) downstream.

Bill Colegrave's expedition to Wakhan in 2007 found that both claimants 2 and 3 had the same source, the Chelab stream, which bifurcates on the watershed of the Little Pamir, half flowing into Lake Chamaktin and half into the parent stream of the Little Pamir/Sarhad River. Therefore, the Chelab stream may be properly considered the true source or parent stream of the Oxus.

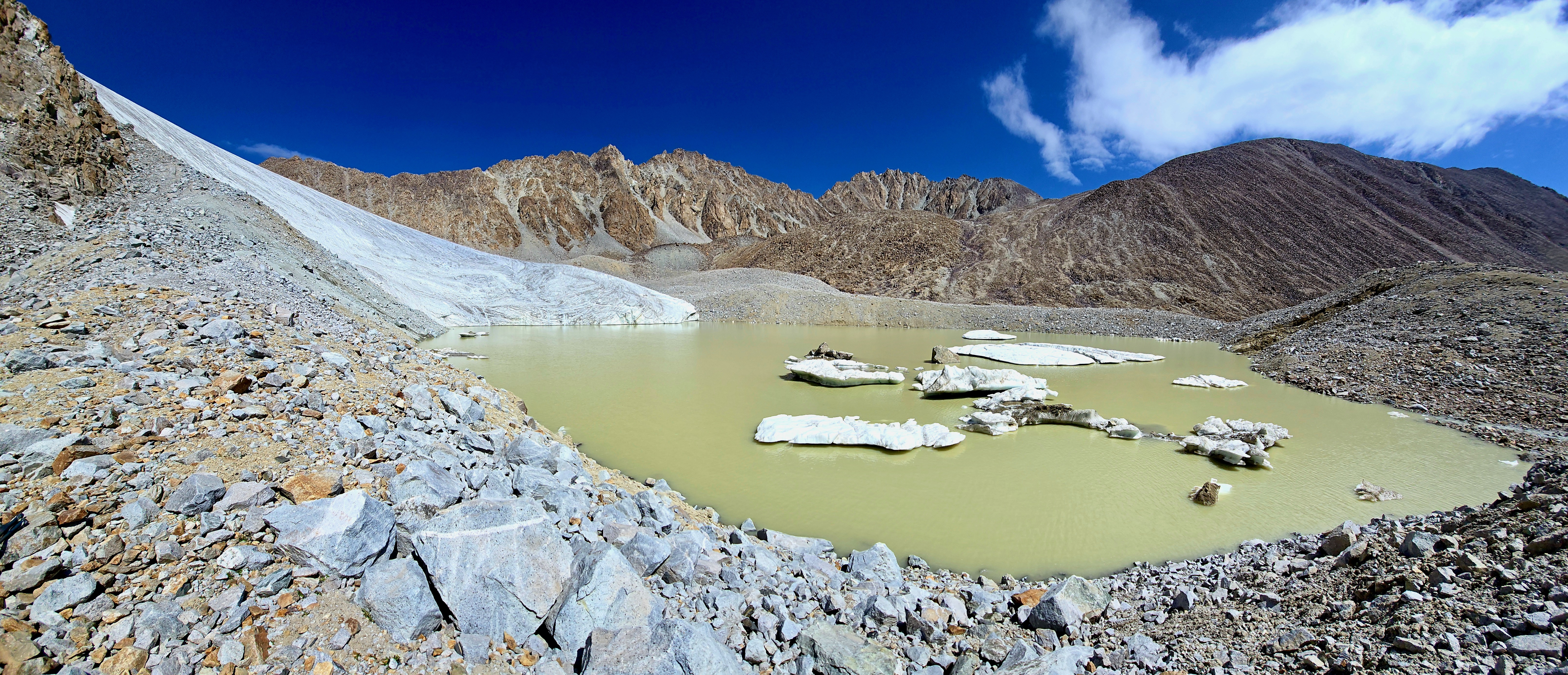
Lake Malang, the source of Chelab Stream and by extension, the true source of the Amu Darya (Oxus River), Afghanistan, August 2025

In 2025, Kate Leeming and Rupert McCowan led an expedition to determine the source of Chelab stream and therefore the true source of the Amu Darya (Oxus River). Approximately 7km from where the Chelab bifurcates the team came to the confluence of its two principal contributory streams. Deciding that the West stream had the largest flow, they followed it a further 7.67km, crossing 28 contributory streams along the way to reach, on 16 August, the source of the Chelab, a glacial lake at 4951m altitude. The lake is now considered the true source of not only the Chelab, but also the Amu Darya (Oxus River) because it is the head of the longest of the contributory streams, has the greatest flow, the highest altitude, and importantly, it has been assessed as a permanent geographical feature in the landscape (essential for it to be considered a true source). The team named the source Lake Malang after their esteemed Afghani guide, Malang Darya.

The Panj River forms the border of Afghanistan and Tajikistan. It flows west to Ishkashim where it turns north and then north-west through the Pamirs passing the Tajikistan–Afghanistan Friendship Bridge. It subsequently forms the border of Afghanistan and Uzbekistan for about 200 kilometres (120 mi), passing Termez and the Afghanistan–Uzbekistan Friendship Bridge. It delineates the border of Afghanistan and Turkmenistan for another 100 kilometres (62 mi) before it flows into Turkmenistan at Atamurat. It flows across Turkmenistan south to north, passing Türkmenabat, and forms the border of Turkmenistan and Uzbekistan from Halkabat. It is then split by the Tuyamuyun Hydro Complex into many waterways that used to form the river delta joining the Aral Sea, passing Urgench, Daşoguz, and other cities, but it does not reach what is left of the sea any more and is lost in the desert. Use of water from the Amu Darya for irrigation has been a major contributing factor to the shrinking of the Aral Sea since the late 1950s. Historical records state that in different periods, the river flowed into the Aral Sea (from the south), into the Caspian Sea (from the east), or both, similar to the Syr Darya (Jaxartes, in Ancient Greek). Partly based on such records, first Tsarist and later Soviet engineers proposed to divert the Amu Darya to the Caspian Sea by constructing the Transcaspian Canal.

== Drainage basin ==
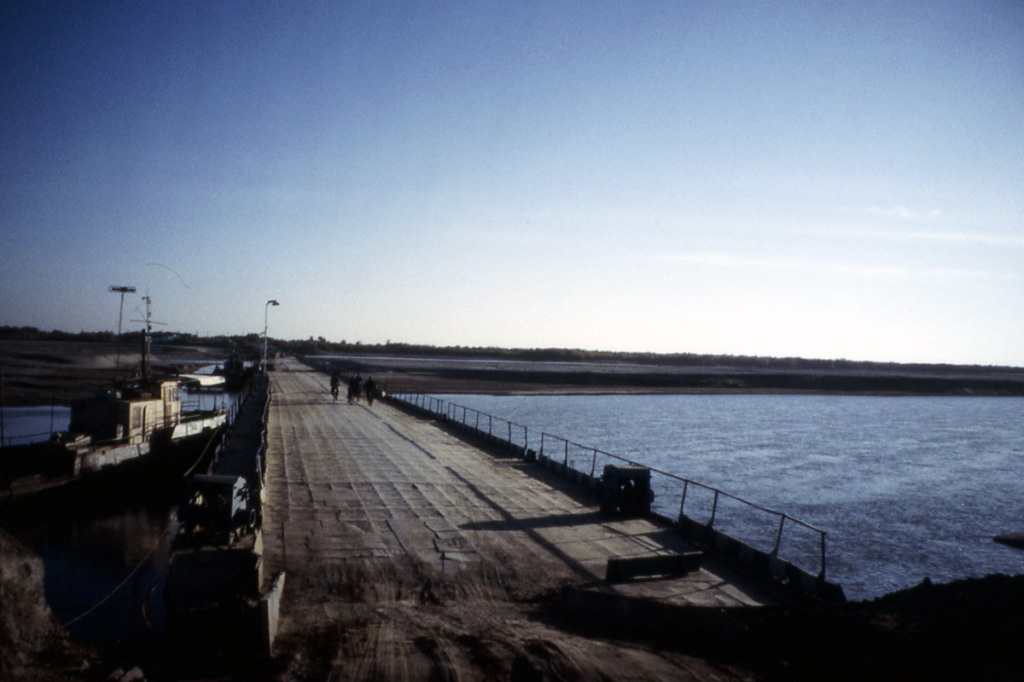
Pontoon Bridge on the Amu River near Urgench, in 2014 it was replaced by the stationary bridge.

The 534,769 square kilometres (206,475 mi^{2}) of the Amu Darya drainage basin include most of Tajikistan, the southwest corner of Kyrgyzstan, the northeast corner of Afghanistan, a narrow portion of eastern Turkmenistan and the western half of Uzbekistan. Part of the Amu Darya basin divide forms Tajikistan's border with China and Afghanistan's border with Pakistan. About 61% of the drainage lies within Tajikistan, Uzbekistan and Turkmenistan, while 39% is in Afghanistan.

The abundant water flowing in the Amu Darya comes almost entirely from glaciers in the Pamir Mountains and Tian Shan, which, standing above the surrounding arid plain, collect atmospheric moisture which otherwise would probably escape elsewhere. Without its mountain water sources, the Amu Darya would not exist—because it rarely rains in the lowlands through which most of the river flows. Of the total drainage area, only about 200,000 square kilometres (77,000 mi^{2}) actively contribute water to the river. This is because many of the river's major tributaries (especially the Zeravshan River) have been diverted, and much of the river's drainage is arid. Throughout most of the steppe, the annual rainfall is about 300 millimetres (12 in).

== History ==
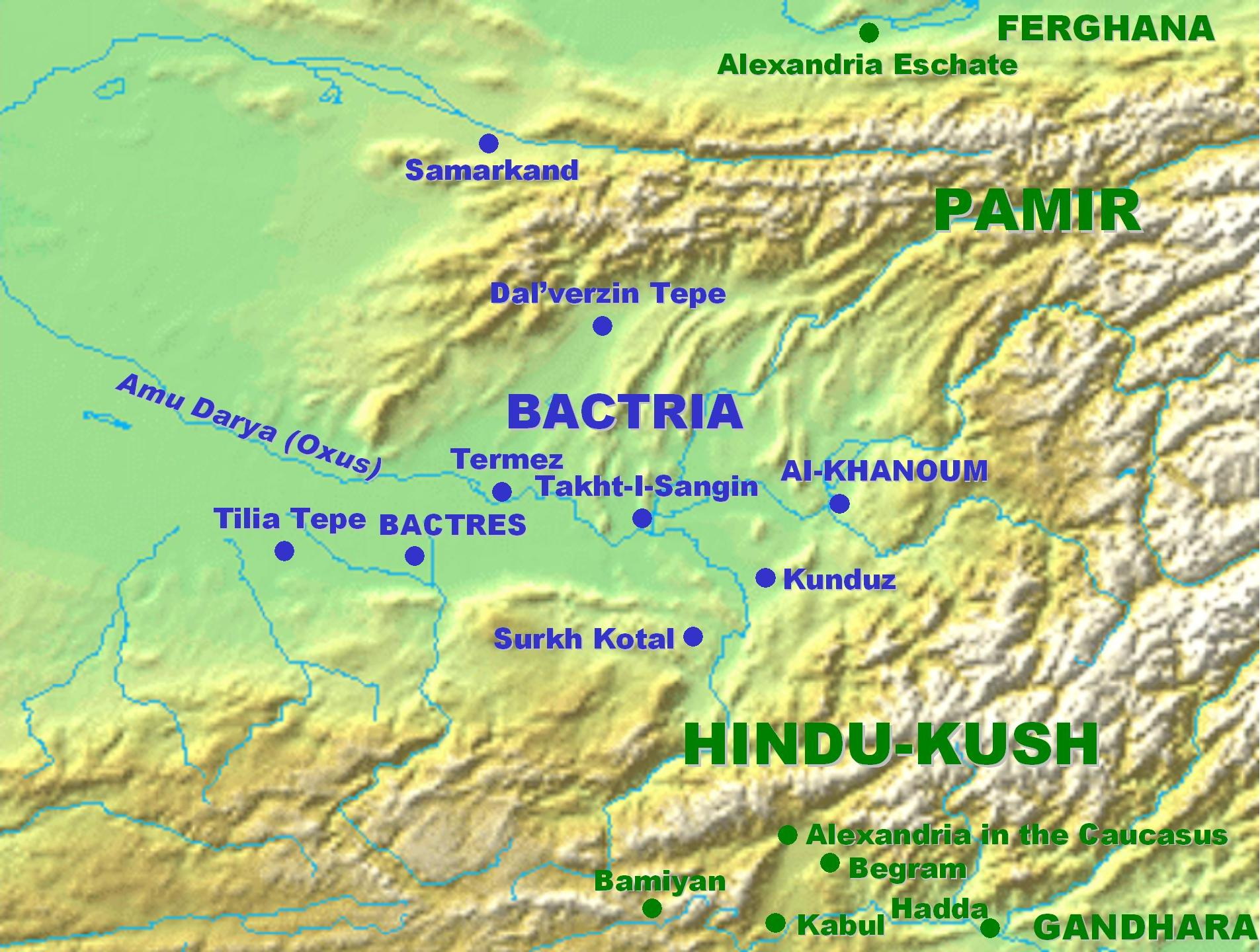
Ancient Bactria

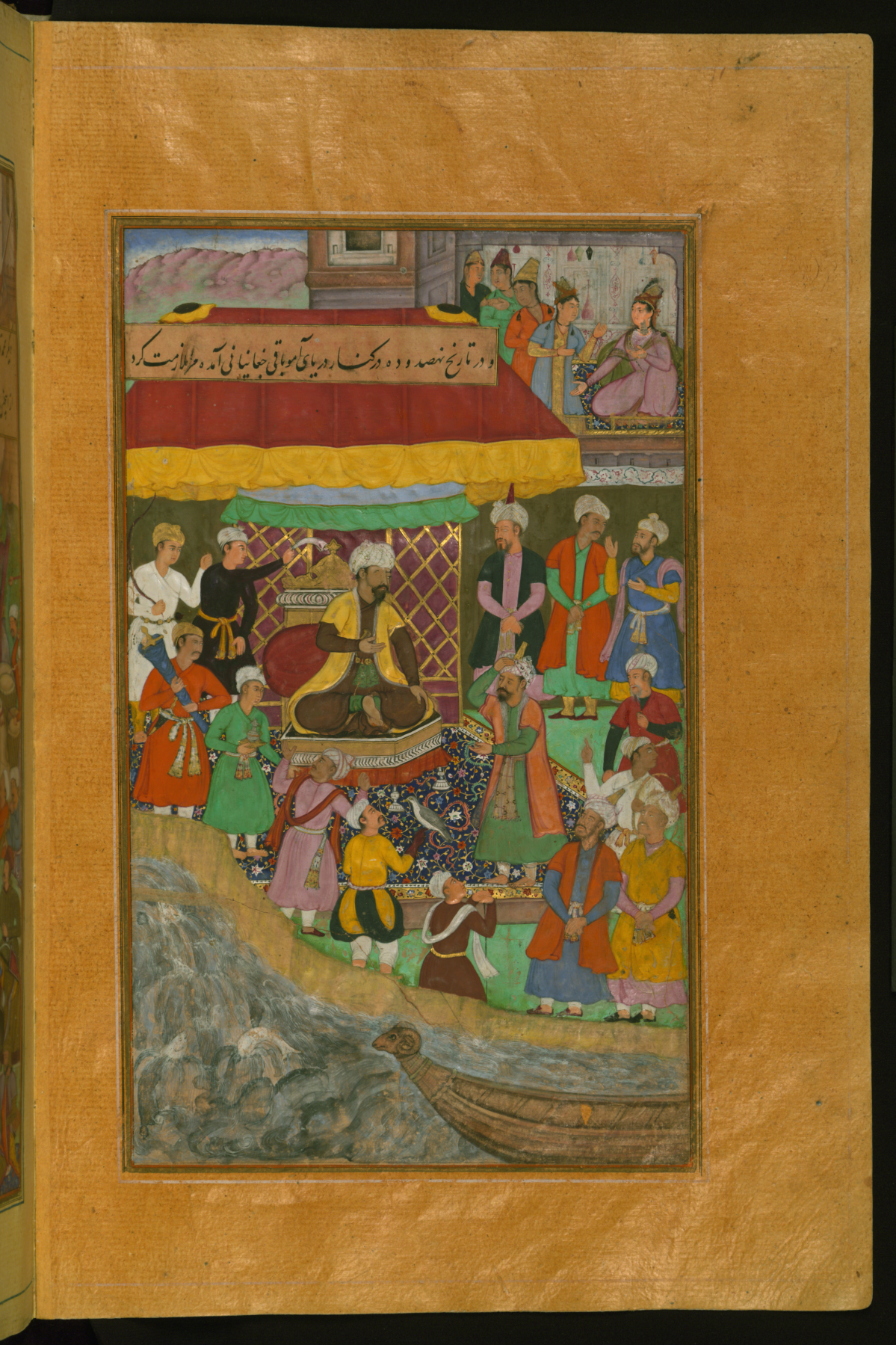
Bāqī Chaghānyānī pays homage to Babur beside the Amu Darya river, AD 1504

In the late 3rd millennium BCE, the watershed was home to a river valley civilization, forgotten to history until its discovery by Soviet archaeologists in the 1970's.

The ancient Greeks called the Amu Darya the Oxus. In ancient times, the river was regarded as the boundary between Greater Iran and Ṫūrān (Persian: تُوران). The river's drainage lies in the area between the former empires of Genghis Khan and Alexander the Great, although they occurred at very different times. When the Mongols came to the area, they used the water of the Amu Darya to flood Konye-Urgench. One southern route of the Silk Road ran along part of the Amu Darya northwestward from Termez before going westwards to the Caspian Sea.

According to the Quaternary International, it is possible that the Amu Darya's course across the Karakum Desert has gone through several major shifts in the past few thousand years. Much of the time – most recently from the 13th century to the late 16th century – the Amu Darya emptied into both the Aral and the Caspian Seas, reaching the latter via a large distributary called the Uzboy River. The Uzboy splits off from the main channel just south of the river's delta. Sometimes the flow through the two branches was more or less equal, but often most of the Amu Darya's flow split to the west and flowed into the Caspian.

People began to settle along the lower Amu Darya and the Uzboy in the 5th century, establishing a thriving chain of agricultural lands, towns, and cities. In about AD 985, the massive Gurganj Dam at the bifurcation of the forks started to divert water to the Aral. Genghis Khan's troops destroyed the dam in 1221, and the Amu Darya shifted to distributing its flow more or less equally between the main stem and the Uzboy. But in the 18th century, the river again turned north, flowing into the Aral Sea, a path it has taken since. Less and less water flowed down the Uzboy. When Russian explorer Bekovich-Cherkasski surveyed the region in 1720, the Amu Darya did not flow into the Caspian Sea anymore.

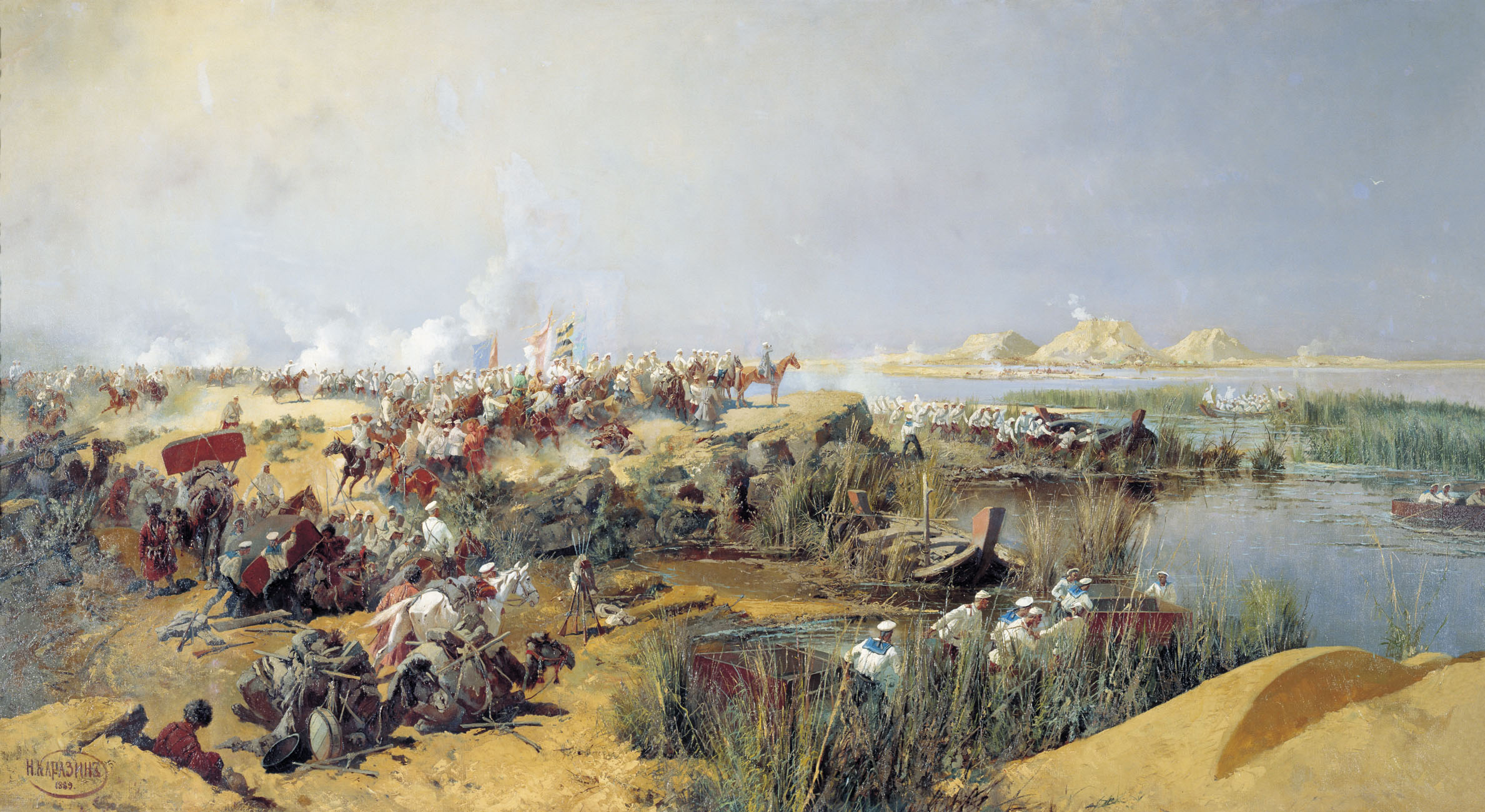
Russian troops crossing Amu Darya, c. 1873

By the 1800s, the ethnographic makeup of the region was described by Peter Kropotkin as the communities of "the vassal Khanates of Maimene, Khulm, Kunduz, and even the Badakshan and Wahkran." An Englishman, William Moorcroft, visited the Oxus around 1824 during the Great Game period. Another Englishman, a naval officer called John Wood, came with an expedition to find the source of the river in 1839. He found modern-day Lake Zorkul, called it Lake Victoria, and proclaimed he had found the source. Then, the French explorer and geographer Thibaut Viné collected a lot of information about this area during five expeditions between 1856 and 1862.

The question of finding a route between the Oxus valley and India has been of concern historically. A direct route crosses extremely high mountain passes in the Hindu Kush and isolated areas like Kafiristan. Some in Britain feared that the Empire of Russia, which at the time wielded great influence over the Oxus area, would overcome these obstacles and find a suitable route through which to invade British India – but this never came to pass. The area was taken over by Russia during the Russian conquest of Turkestan.

The Soviet Union became the ruling power in the early 1920s and expelled Mohammed Alim Khan. It later put down the Basmachi movement and killed Ibrahim Bek. A large refugee population of Central Asians, including Turkmen, Tajiks, and Uzbeks, fled to northern Afghanistan. In the 1960s and 1970s the Soviets started using the Amu Darya and the Syr Darya to irrigate extensive cotton fields in the Central Asian plain. Before this time, water from the rivers was already being used for agriculture, but not on this massive scale. The Qaraqum Canal, Karshi Canal, and Bukhara Canal were among the largest of the irrigation diversions built. However, the Main Turkmen Canal, which would have diverted water along the dry Uzboy River bed into central Turkmenistan, was never built. In the course of the Soviet–Afghan War in the 1970s, Soviet forces used the valley to invade Afghanistan through Termez. The Soviet Union fell in the 1990s and Central Asia split up into the many smaller countries that lie within or partially within the Amu Darya basin.

During the Soviet era, a resource-sharing system was instated in which Kyrgyzstan and Tajikistan shared water originating from the Amu and Syr Daryas with Kazakhstan, Turkmenistan, and Uzbekistan in summer. In return, Kyrgyzstan and Tajikistan received Kazakh, Turkmen, and Uzbek coal, gas, and electricity in winter. After the fall of the Soviet Union this system disintegrated and the Central Asian nations have failed to reinstate it. Inadequate infrastructure, poor water management, and outdated irrigation methods all exacerbate the issue.

=== Siberian Tiger Introduction Project ===
The Caspian tiger used to occur along the river's banks, but was last seen in the area in the 1970s. After its extirpation, the Amu Darya's delta was suggested as a potential site for the introduction of its closest surviving relative, the Siberian tiger. A feasibility study was initiated to investigate if the area is suitable and if such an initiative would receive support from relevant decision makers. A viable tiger population of about 100 animals would require at least 5,000 km^{2} (1,900 sq mi) of large tracts of contiguous habitat with rich prey populations. Such habitat is not available at this stage and cannot be provided in the short term. The proposed region is therefore unsuitable for the reintroduction, at least at this stage.

=== Resource extraction ===
Since March 2022, the building of the 285 km Qosh Tepa Canal has been underway in northern Afghanistan to divert water from the Amu Darya. Uzbekistan has expressed concern that the canal will have an adverse effect on its agriculture. The canal is also expected to make the Aral Sea disaster worse, and in 2023 Uzbek officials held talks on the canal with the Taliban. The Taliban has made the canal a priority, with images supplied by Planet Labs demonstrate that from April 2022 to February 2023, more than 100 km of canal was excavated. According to the Taliban, the initiative is expected to convert 550,000 hectares of desert into farmland.

In January 2023, the Xinjiang Central Asia Petroleum and Gas Company (aka CAPEIC) signed a $720 million four-year investment deal with the Taliban government of Afghanistan for extraction on its side of the Amu Darya basin. The deal will see a 15% royalty given to the Afghan government over the course of its 25-year term. A 2019 study by PetroChina listed this basin as the third-largest potential gas field in the world. The deal collapsed prematurely in 2025 when the contract was terminated, two years after it was signed.

== Literature ==
The clashing noise of battle reached the sky

The blood of the Bengalees flowed like the river Jaihun.

~ Mirza Nathan (1600s) describing a battle between the Mughals and Musa Khan of Bengal (translated by M. I. Borah)

— Baharistan-i-Ghaibi,

But the majestic River floated on,

Out of the mist and hum of that low land,
Into the frosty starlight, and there moved,
Rejoicing, through the hushed Chorasmian waste,
Under the solitary moon: — he flowed
Right for the polar star, past Orgunjè,
Brimming, and bright, and large: then sands begin
To hem his watery march, and dam his streams,
And split his currents; that for many a league
The shorn and parcelled Oxus strains along
Through beds of sand and matted rushy isles —
Oxus, forgetting the bright speed he had
In his high mountain-cradle in Pamere,
A foiled circuitous wanderer: — till at last
The longed-for dash of waves is heard, and wide
His luminous home of waters opens, bright
And tranquil, from whose floor the new-bathed stars
Emerge, and shine upon the Aral Sea.

~ Matthew Arnold, Sohrab and Rustum, 1853

The Oxus river, and Arnold's poem, fire the imaginations of the children who adventure with ponies over the moors of the West Country in the 1937 children's book The Far-Distant Oxus. There were two sequels, Escape to Persia and Oxus in Summer.

Robert Byron's 1937 travelogue, The Road to Oxiana, describes its author's journey from the Levant through Persia to Afghanistan, with the Oxus as his stated goal, "to see certain famous monuments, chiefly the Gonbad-e Qabus, a tower built as a mausoleum for an ancient king."

George MacDonald Fraser's Flashman at the Charge (1973), places Flashman on the Amu Darya and the Aral Sea during the (fictitious) Russian advance on India during The Great Game period.

Bill Colegrave's Halfway House to Heaven (2010), describes the 2007 expedition that finally determined the true source of the river.

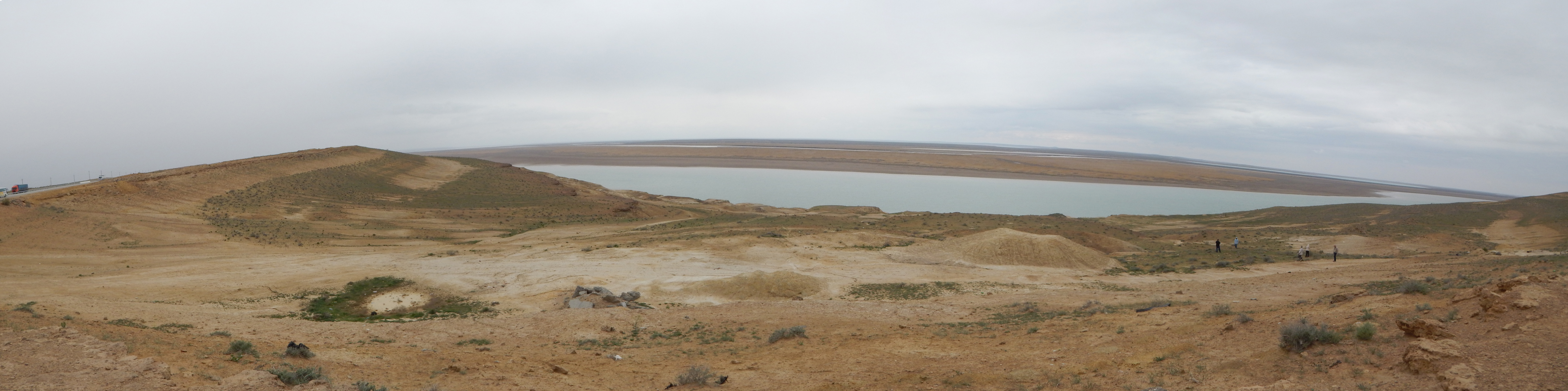
Panorama of Amu Darya River from 2016-04-06

== See also ==
- Oxus Treasure
- Vankhsh River
- Mount Imeon
- Sherabad River
- Surkhan Darya
- Transoxiana
- Zeravshan River
- Extreme points of Afghanistan
- List of rivers of Afghanistan
