= Kosonsoy Mosque =

Mosque in Namangan, Uzbekistan

Kosonsoy Congregational Mosque
- Kosonsoy Jome masjidi
- Interactive map of the Kosonsoy Congregational Mosque area
- Alternative names: Kosonsoy Mosque

General information
- Architectural style: Islamic
- Location: Kosonsoy, Namangan Region, Uzbekistan
- Coordinates: 41.250°N 71.550°E
- Year built: 18th century
- Renovated: 1989-1993

Technical details
- Material: Brick, plaster
- Size: 28.6x10.8 meters

The Kosonsoy Congregational Mosque (Uzbek: Kosonsoy Jome masjidi) is a historical monument (18th century) in Namangan, Uzbekistan. It is built on a courtyard surrounded by a wall. It can be entered through a portal with a dome on the south side, or through a carved door on the west side that leads to a rectangular mosque (28.6 x 10.8 m). The west wall has a three-niche mihrab. The external dome is supported by four arches (projecting from the corners). The four arches are based on four side wings, which are themselves supported by separate or wall-attached wooden columns. The building is mainly decorated with two colors (white and blue). The portal is simple, but elegant, with a row of small arches on the upper part, ending with a cornice, and surrounded by flat arches. The portal has a dome on each corner. In 1993, a veranda, classrooms and other additional buildings were constructed. The Kosonsoy Jome Mosque is the only prayer-style building in the Fergana Valley, and reflects the skill of local architects in construction.

== History of the mosque construction ==
The construction of the Jome Mosque in Kosonsoy began in the 17th century, during the reign of Abdullakhan. After the stones were piled up, a large bathhouse was built next to the mosque. The city's scholars gathered and prayed for the success of the mosque. A hundred years later, a gate was built in front of the mosque. The stones of the gate were brought from Oqqo'rg'on. During the former Soviet period, it was first used as a warehouse and then as a school. In 1991, with the honor of the independence of the Republic of Uzbekistan, this building was restored as a mosque. The materials used in the construction were clay, baked bricks, gypsum, and wood. The mosque has 84 rooms, a domed madrasa, and student rooms. The new building of the mosque was named after A'loxon Maxdum, who was buried nearby, in 1992. The portal and domes are decorated with carvings, paintings, embroidery, plasterwork, and fine art. There are 8 rooms, each 2m wide and 9m high. The width of the building is 27m, the height is 16m, and the dome height is 27m. The mosque can accommodate 7500 worshipers. The Jome Mosque is unique in Central Asia for its architecture and capacity.
