= Sirli Mosque =

Mosque in Namangan, Uzbekistan

- Interactive map of the Sirli Mosque area

General information
- Architectural style: Uzbek national style
- Location: Kokand Street, Namangan
- Coordinates: 40.9989°N 71.6311°E
- Year built: 19th or early 20th century
- Renovated: 2002-2008
- Demolished: 2002 (fire)

Technical details
- Material: Brick, wood, plaster

The Sirli Mosque (Uzbek: Sirli masjid) is an architectural monument located on Kokand Street in Namangan city, Namangan Region, Uzbekistan. It was built in the 19th century or in the early 20th century in the village of Tepakurgan.

It is currently included in the list of material cultural heritage of Uzbekistan of republican significance.

== History ==
Sirli Mosque (meaning painted, gilded, beautiful in translation) was built in the 19th century or in the early 20th century in the village of Tepakurgan (now a settlement in Namangan District). Different sources give different dates for the construction of the mosque. For example, writer Abdulla Jabbar writes that it was built in 1840. However, researcher B. Ruzinov claims that it was built in 1910, after studying the entrance portal of the mosque.

During the Soviet period, the mosque was closed. By the end of the 1980s, it had fallen into complete decay and was abandoned. After Uzbekistan gained independence, in the 1990s, local residents began to use the mosque again. In 1998, the building was registered as a mosque.

In 2002, due to a short circuit in the wiring, the building burned down completely. In 2002–2004, a new domed mosque measuring 22 x 18 meters was built, having a modern appearance. In addition to the mosque, in 2004–2007, a minaret 15 meters high, a room for the imam-khatib, a security room, a storeroom, a kitchen, a dining room, a room for washing and a toilet were built. In 2008, the exterior walls of the mosque were lined with Khorezm brick in the national style. In 2014, the interior was decorated in the national style, characteristic of the Fergana Valley. As of 2023, the imam of the mosque is Mansur Mansurov, a graduate of the Tashkent Islamic Institute.

== Architecture ==
In front of the mosque, a pool (10.0 x 19.0 meters) was built, and in the depth of the courtyard among the plane trees, its building is visible. The mosque is asymmetrical and consists of a rectangular two-column hall (11.35 x 8.0 meters) and a two-sided veranda. The main facade is built with a canopy of 7 spans. Arched mihrabs are built in the hall and on the ayvan. The interior of the hall is devoid of decor, but the ayvan contains lush ceiling paintings, carved wooden columns decorated with stalactite capitals and figurative bases at the bottom. The top of the walls is bordered by a wide strip of geometric ornament, the work of Fergana masters.
