= Mulla Bozor Okhund Pilgrimage Complex =

Mulla Bozor Okhund Mausoleum
- Mulla Bozor Oxund ziyoratgohi (Uzbek)
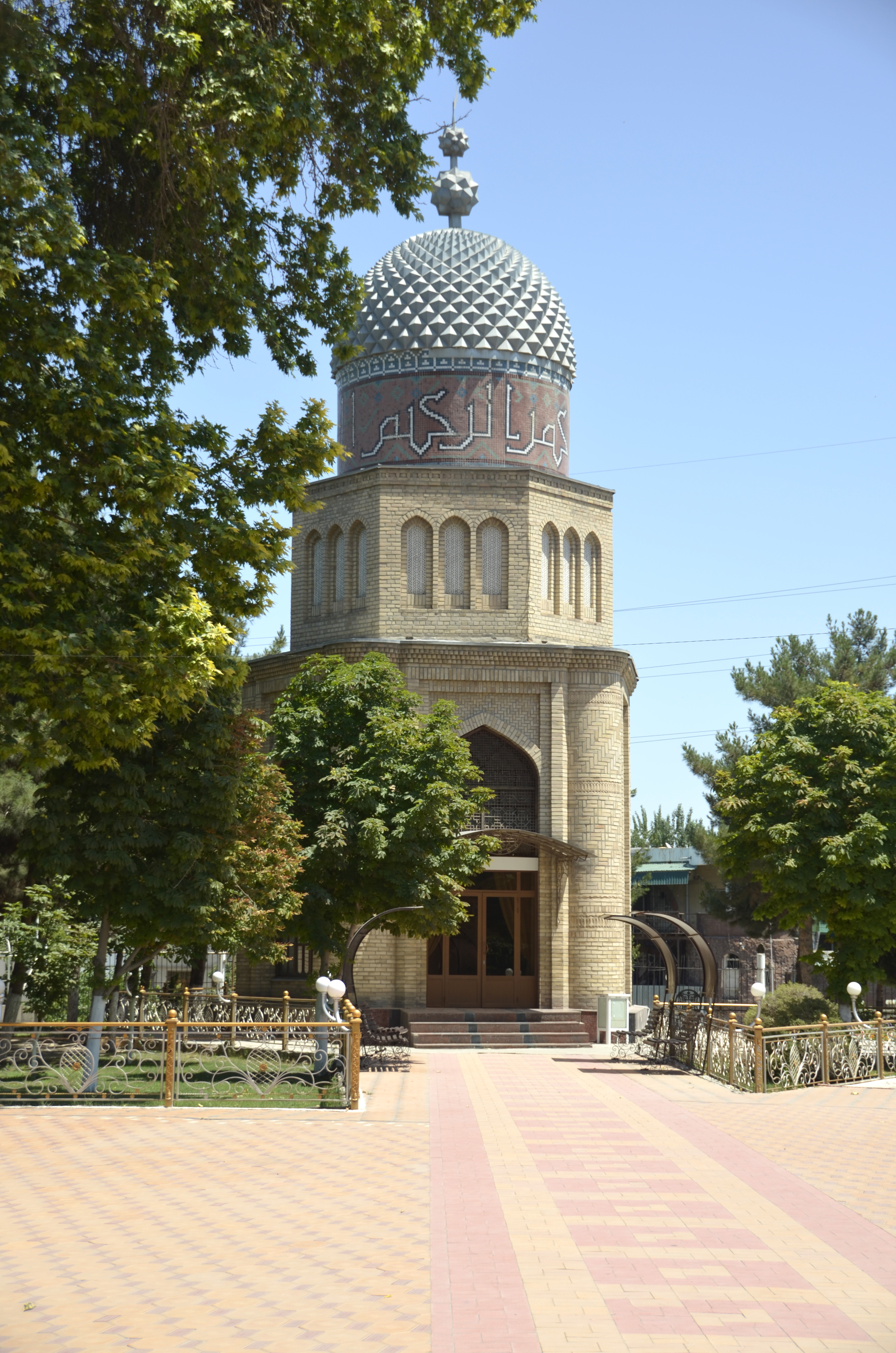
- Mulla Bozor Okhund Mausoleum
- Interactive map of Mulla Bozor Okhund Mausoleum
- 41°0′41″N 71°40′32″E
- Type: Mausoleum
- Location: Namangan Region, Namangan, Uzbekistan

History
- Built: 25 December 1993 (reconstruction)

Site notes
- Architect(s): Abdujabbor Abdug‘afforov; Odiljon Qodirov
- Architectural styles: Brick, reinforced concrete
- Restored: 18 May 1994

The Mulla Bozor Okhund Pilgrimage Complex is a shrine located on the banks of the Namangansoy, in the Kurashkhona area, the Labbaytogha district, Namangan in Uzbekistan.

== Gallery ==
Mulla Bozor Okhund Mausoleum
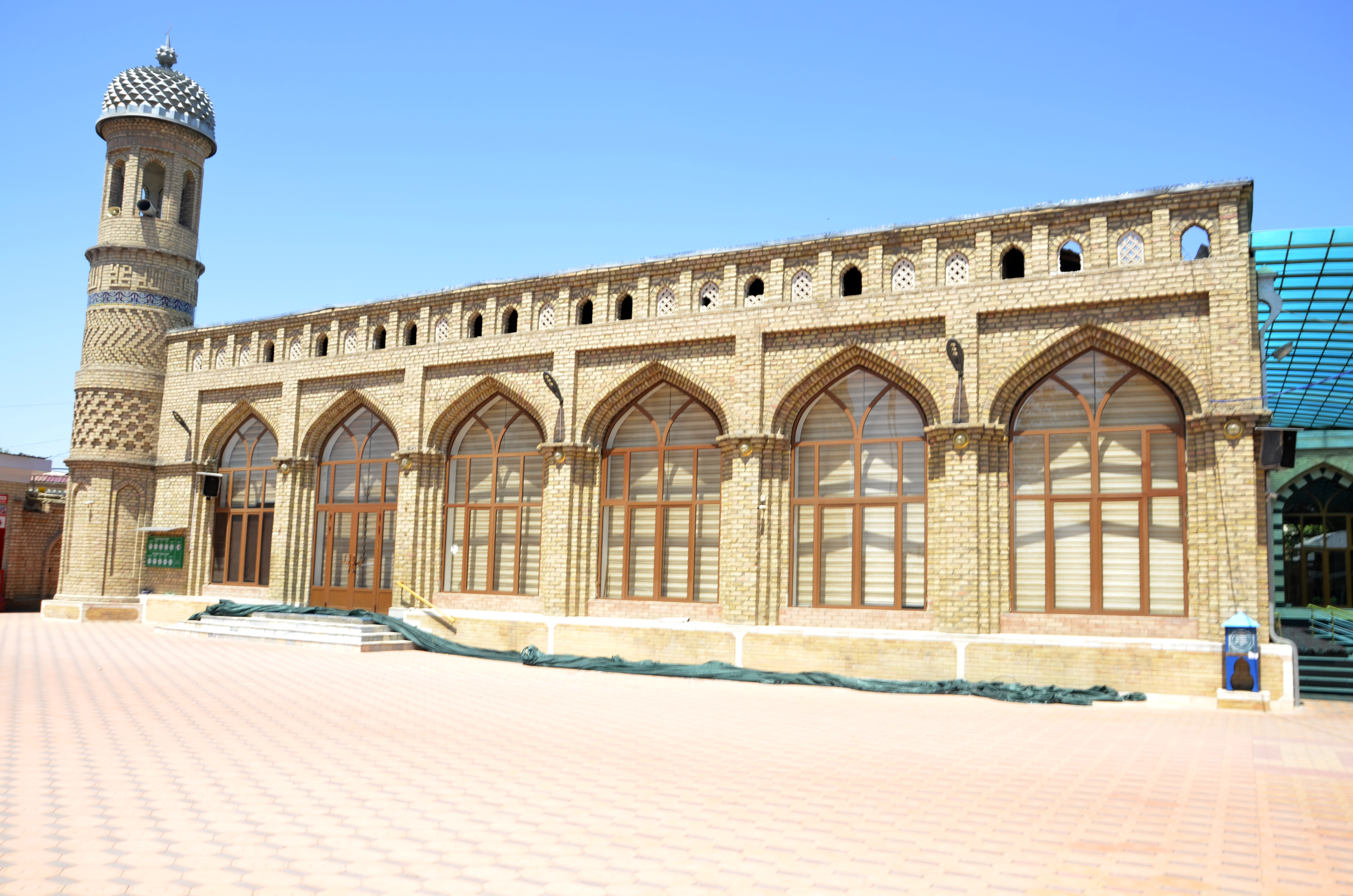
Front view of the minaret of Mulla Bozor Okhund Jome Mosque

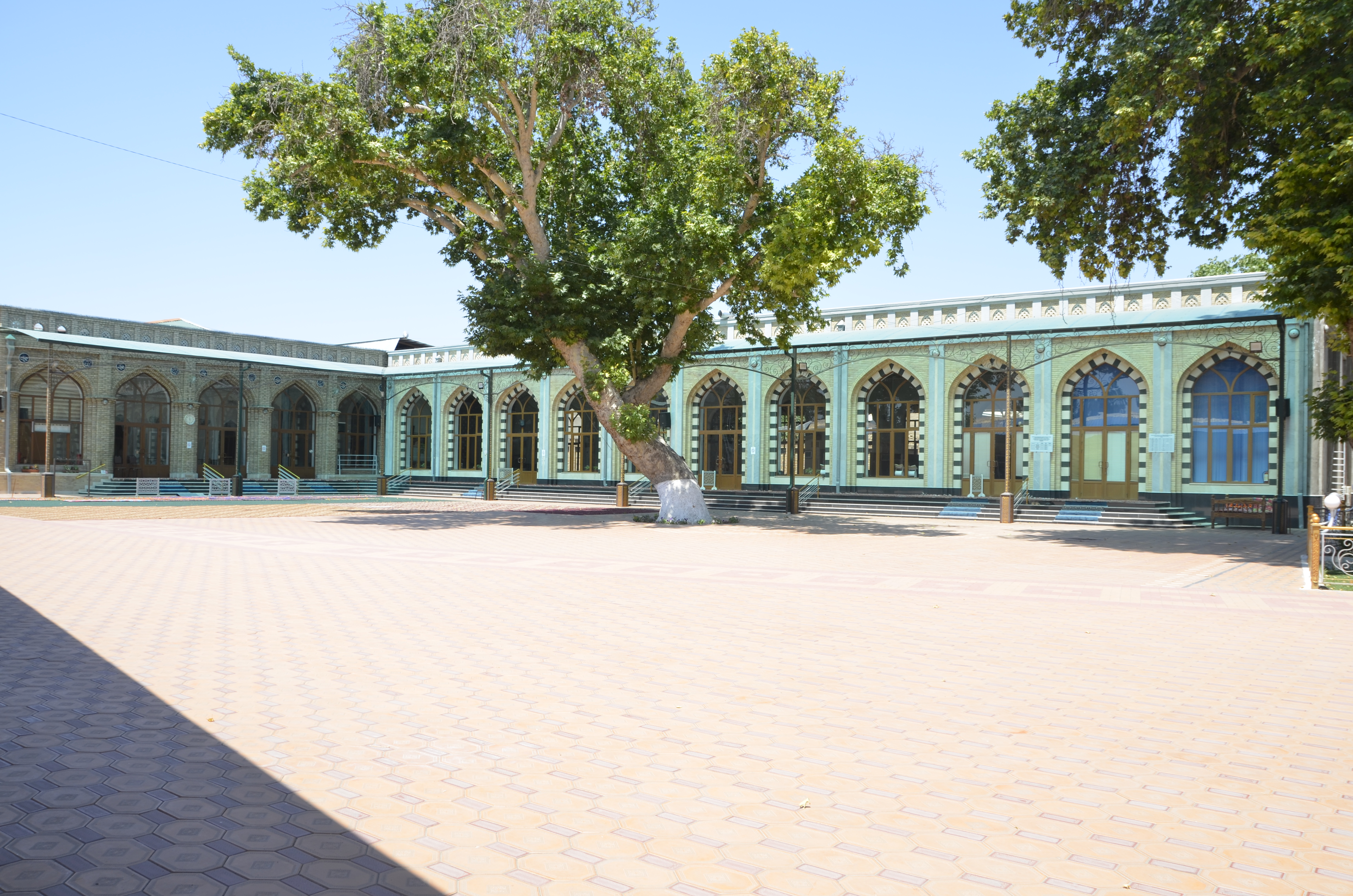
Courtyard of the Mulla Bozor Okhund Jome Mosque

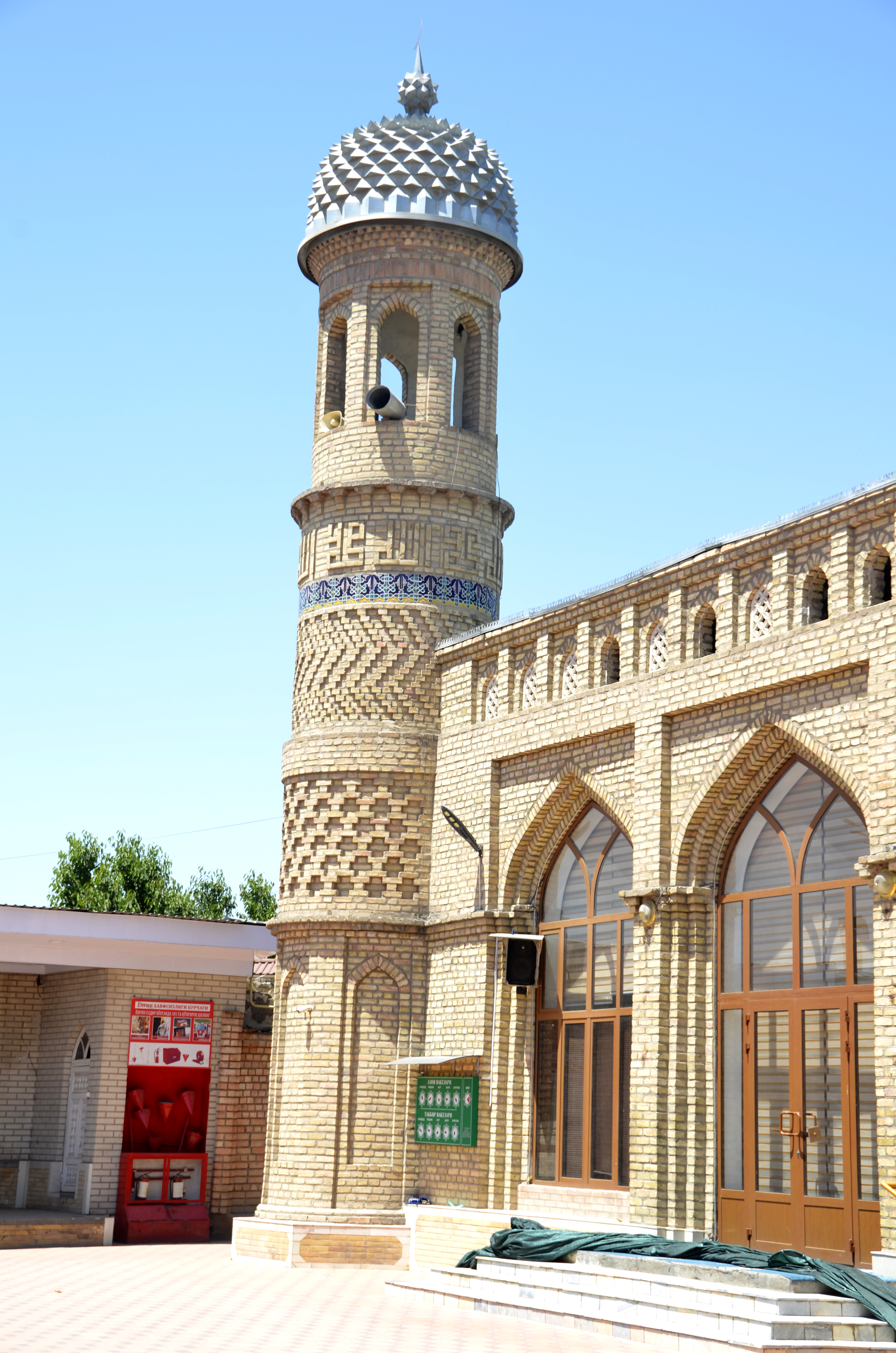
Minaret of the Mulla Bozor Okhund Jome Mosque. Height: 16 m

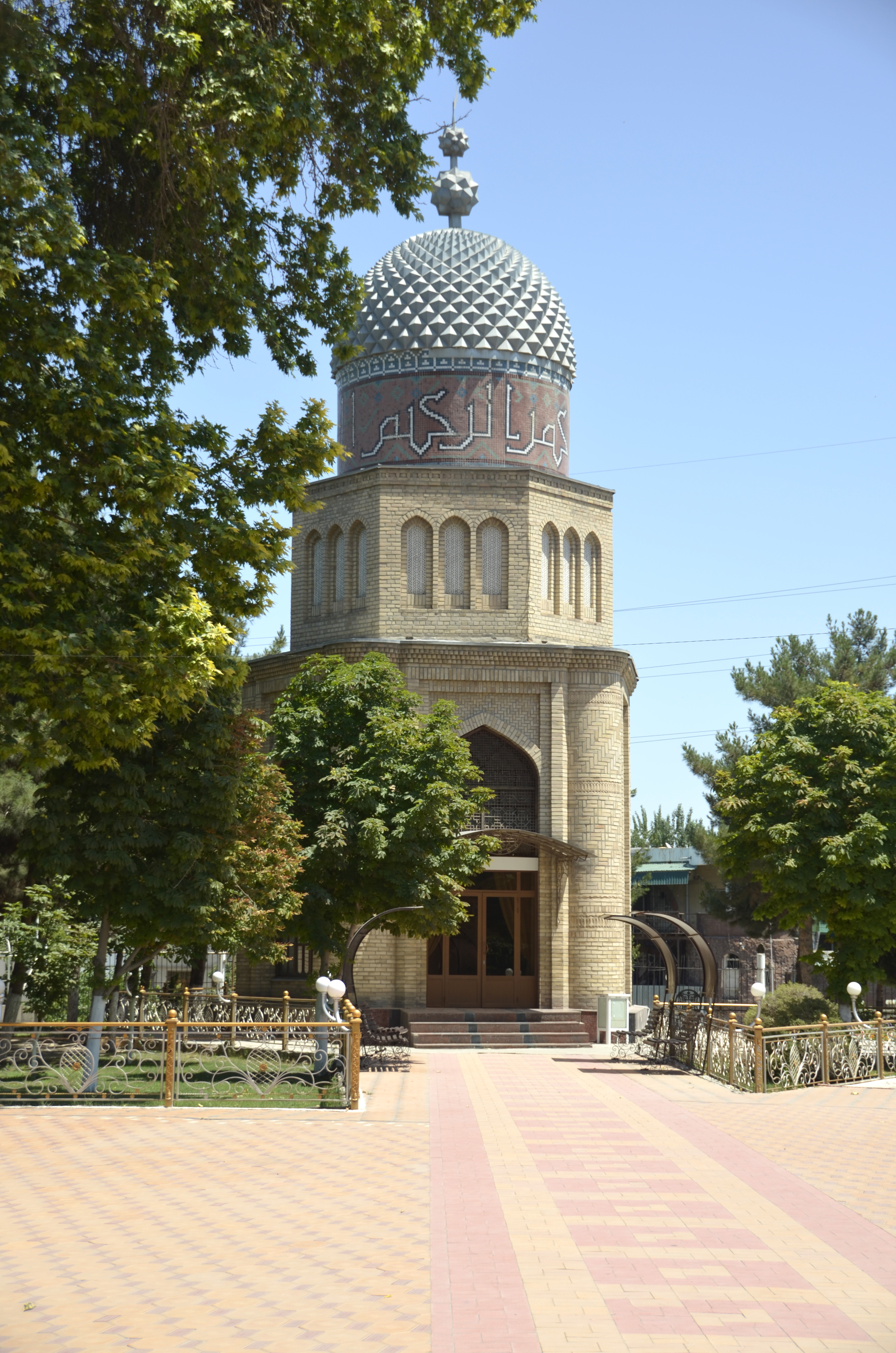
Mulla Bozor Okhund Mausoleum

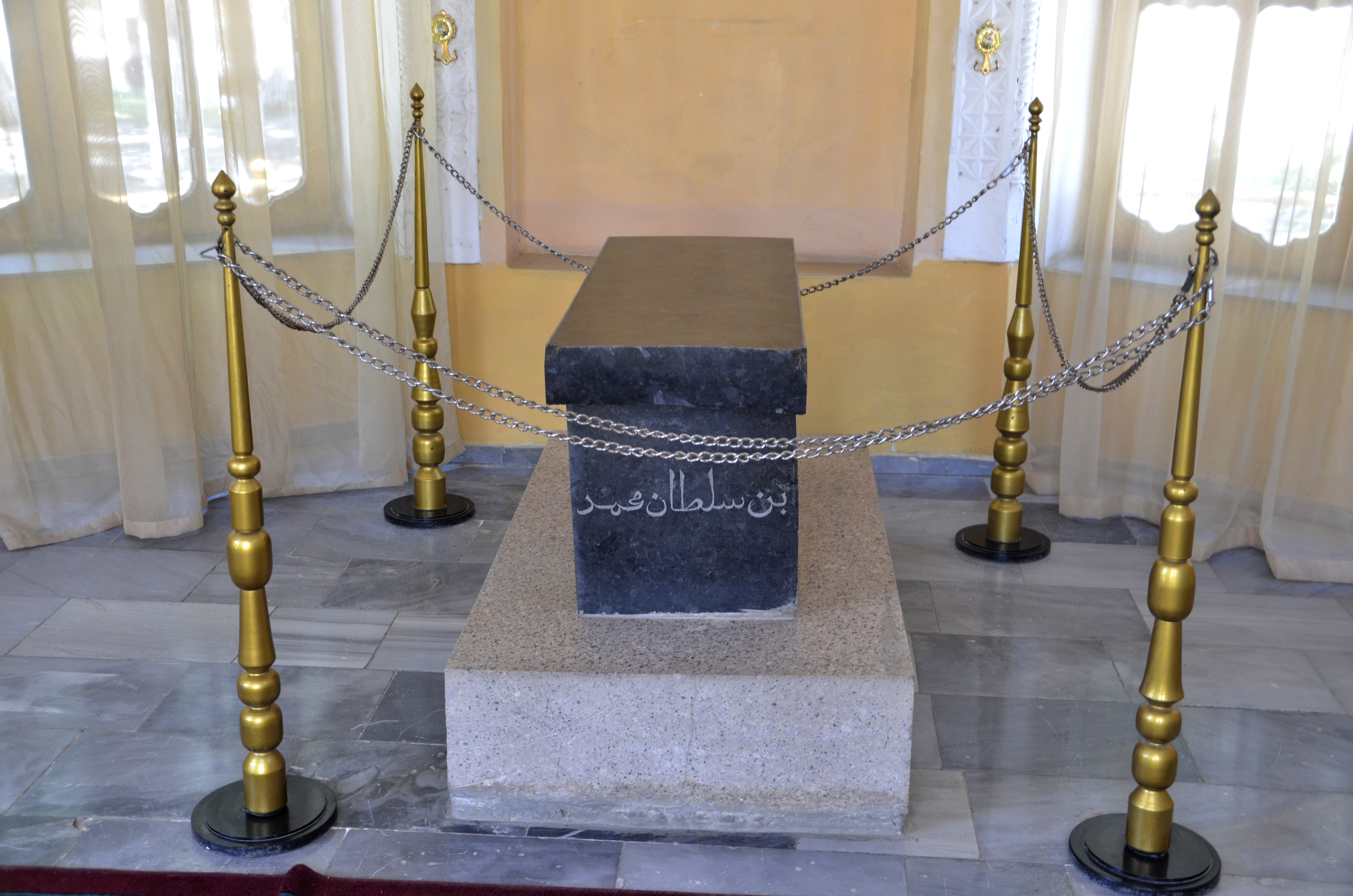
Tomb of Mulla Bozor Okhund

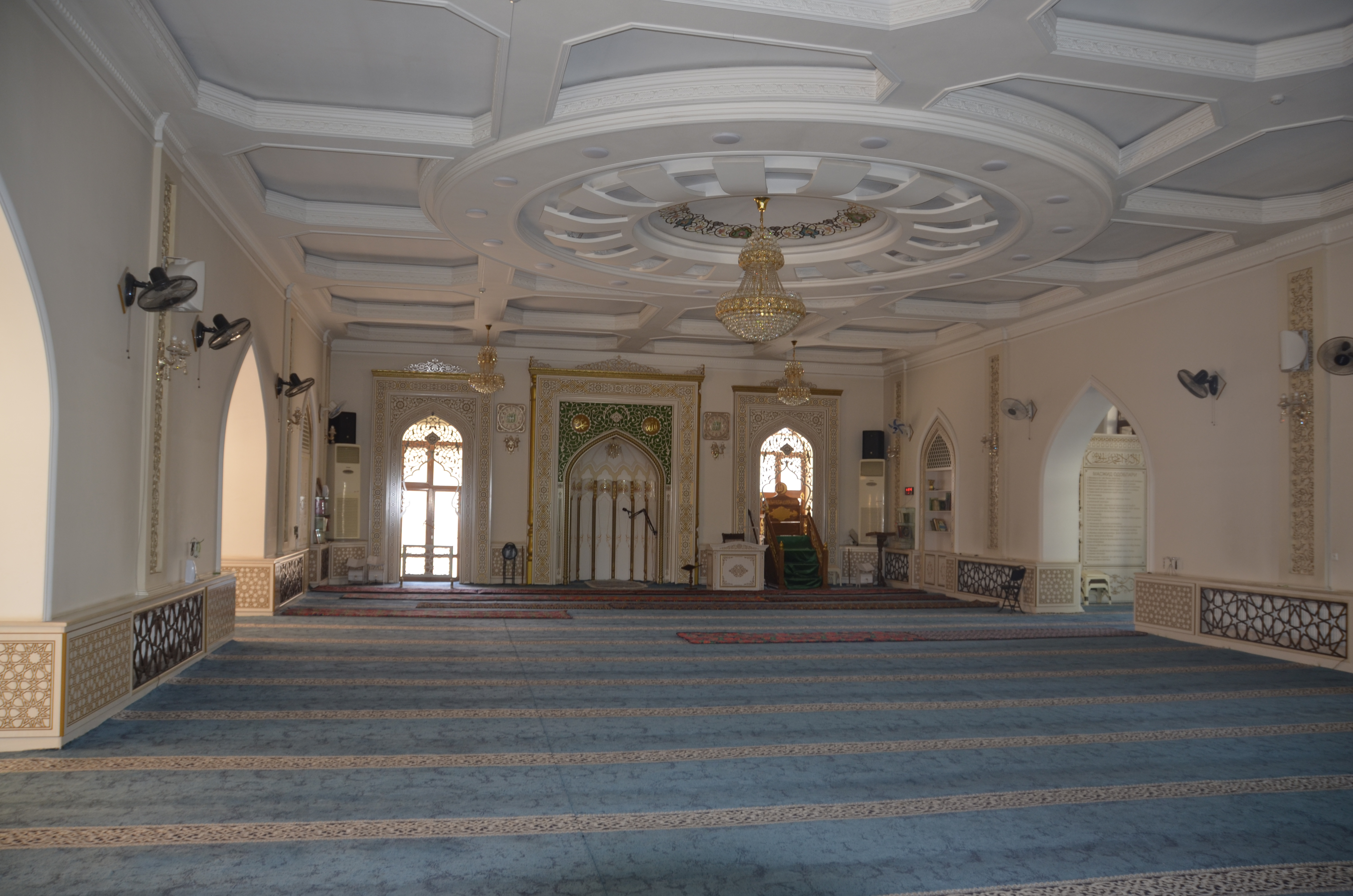
Interior of the Mulla Bozor Okhund Jome Mosque

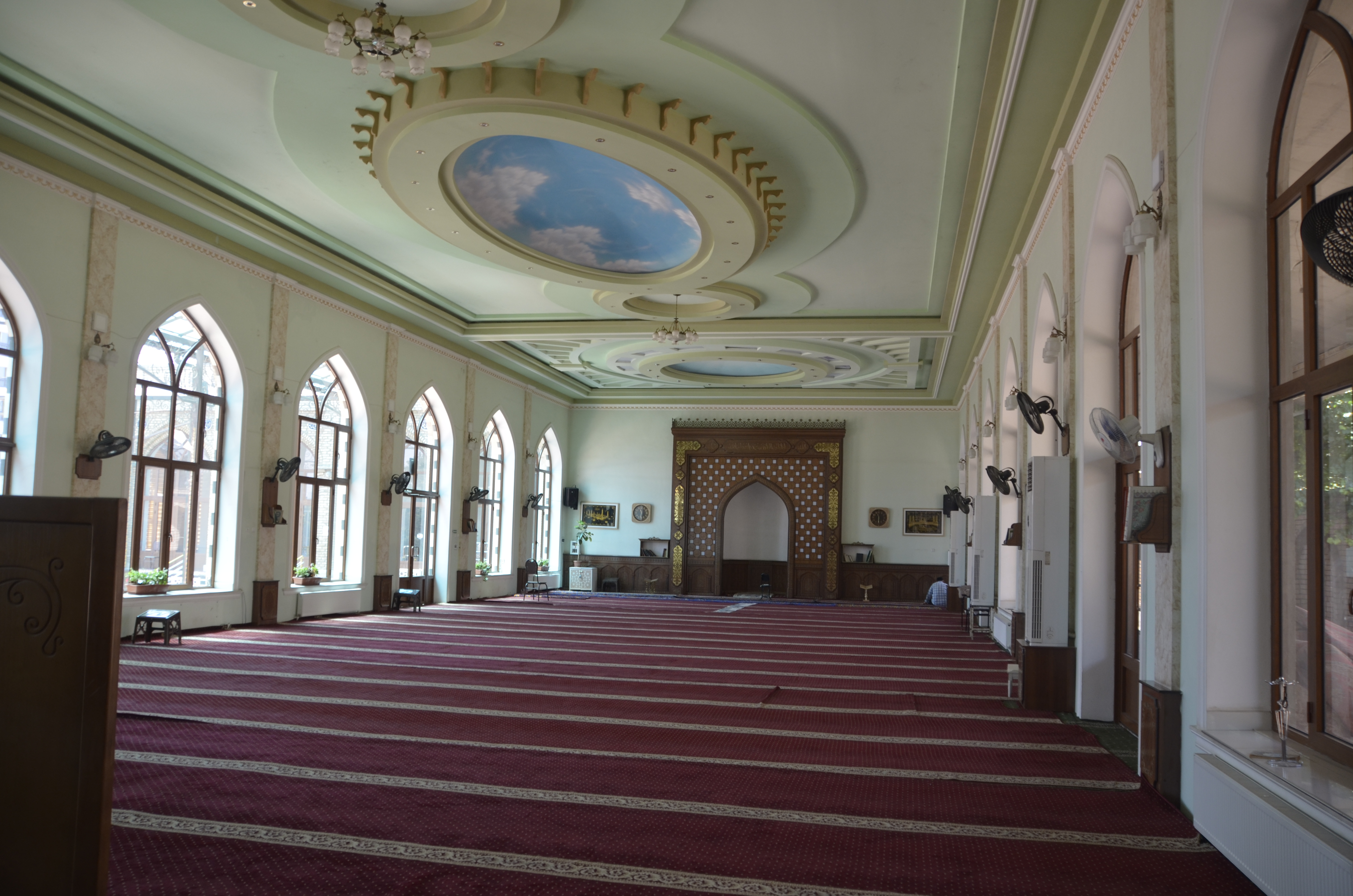
Interior of the Mulla Bozor Okhund Jome Mosque

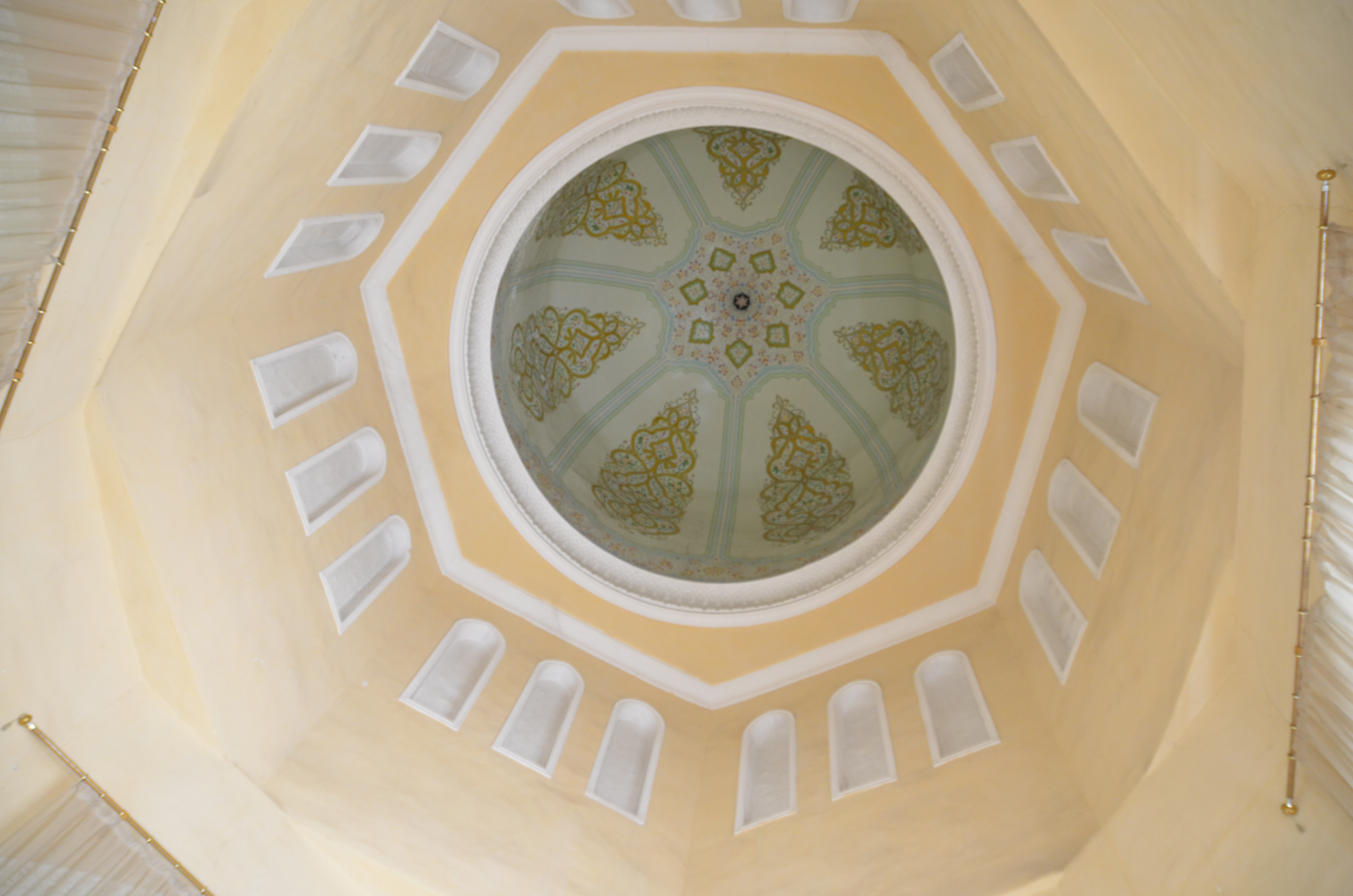
Interior view of the dome of the Mulla Bozor Okhund Mausoleum
