= Kosonsoy =

Kasânsoy Косонсой
- Location in Uzbekistan
- Coordinates: 41°15′N 71°33′E
- Country: Uzbekistan
- Region: Namangan Region
- Elevation: 885 m (2,904 ft)

Population (2016)
  - Total: 50,900
- Time zone: UTC+5
- Postal code: 717235

Kâsânsây also spelled as Kasansay (Uzbek: Kasansay / Косонсой; Tajik: Косонсой; Russian: Касансай) or simply, Kasan, (ancient Kathan or Great Kushan empire) is a city in Namangan Region, Uzbekistan. It is the seat of Kasansay District. Kasansay is named after the River "Kasan" which flows from high mountains of Kyrgyzstan to Turakurgan District (Namangan Region), the word "soy" in from sugdian-tajik and means a "brook".

== History ==
Kosonsoy is an ancient place, this city was a capital of the Kushan Empire. Its first settlements date back to the times of the Kushan Empire. The word "koson" derives from the word Kushan. Kosonsoy was an essential part of Kushan Empire together with ancient city Akhsikent, near Namangan city. There are still remains of ancient Mug Castle of Kushanids in the north part of the city. In other books is written that "koson" means "big town" or "strong castle".

== Population ==
Kasansay has a population of over 270 000 (2023). A vast majority of population in Kasansay are Persian speaking Tajiks(about above 230 000).

== Education ==
There are five Secondary Special Education Colleges (SSEC) and one Academic Lyceum in Kosonsoy. SSECs include medical college, pedagogical college, transport and communication college, technical college and a few others. There are above 50 secondary schools in Kasansay, including many Tajik schools and one Russian and Uzbek schools.

== Environment ==
Kosonsoy is a mountainous place, and the mountain is as close as 3 km to the centre of district. The river Kosonsoy divides the city into two parts.

== Prominent people ==
Ahmad Kasani, a prominent Muslim scholar/scientist/poet, was born in Kasansay, the street of Makhdumi Azam was named after him and there is monument of Makhdumi Azam near the bank of Kasan River, completed in September 2007

Boborahim Mashrab (Shoh Mashrab) was taught by Offokkhoja and he was Mashrab's religion teacher
