= Mausoleum of Devona Buva =

Historic site in Namangan Region, Uzbekistan

- Devona buva maqbarasi (Uzbek)
- Interactive map of Mausoleum of Devona Buva
- 41°00′29″N 71°47′16″E
- Location: Fayziobod village, Uychi District, Namangan Region, Uzbekistan
- Nearest city: Namangan

History
- Built: around 1725-1750
- Built for: Mausoleum

Devona Buva Mausoleum (Uzbek: Devona buva maqbarasi) is an architectural monument located in the village of Fayziobod, Uychi District, Namangan Region, Uzbekistan. The mausoleum was built in the 18th century.

== History ==
Devona Buva Mausoleum was built between 1725 and 1750. The mausoleum is constructed on the grave of a man known as Abdurakhman Khodji, who was born in Tashkent and lived in the village of Fayziobod. He was one of the few literate individuals in the area, teaching children to read and write, practicing medicine, and possessing knowledge of herbs and remedies. Locally, he became known as "Devona-Buva" (translated from Uzbek as "mad grandfather") because when he arrived in the village, he was dressed in rags. He traveled across Central Asia and, in the present-day Papa district, encountered a wandering dervish. They continued their journey together, and at a full-flowing canal, his companion fell into the water, getting completely soaked. Devona Buva insisted that the dervish wear his clothes, and in return, he took the dervish's rags. During the Soviet era, the chairman of the local collective farm built administrative buildings and other structures to obscure the mausoleum. Consequently, the mausoleum has been well-preserved until today and did not suffer during the Soviet period. In 1979, the residents, initiated by the school teacher Ziyoviddin Khodjaev, carried out cosmetic restoration of the mausoleum.

In 2020, restoration work was undertaken on the mausoleum, but it was poorly and incompetently executed.

== Architecture ==
The mausoleum has a square shape with dimensions of 18.8 by 18.8 metres (62 ft × 62 ft). It is surrounded by a thick wall. The complex consists of a main hall, a burial place, and a portal. Platforms are located on both sides of the entrance. The mausoleum has a pointed dome measuring 10.6 by 7.6 metres (35 ft × 25 ft). The complex is constructed from fired bricks. The dome of the sanctuary is placed on a star-shaped base. The interior of the building is adorned several times with floral patterns in plaster. The thematic representations include plants (willow branches, flower bouquets) and epigraphy, requiring special study. Light enters the main hall through openings in the base. The interior is plastered, and the wooden door is decorated with intricate carvings.
