= Mavlonbuva Mausoleum =

- Mavlonbuva maqbarasi
- Location within Uzbekistan

General information
- Type: Mausoleum
- Architectural style: Islamic
- Location: Namangan Region, Uzbekistan
- Coordinates: 40.9998°N 71.6329°E
- Named for: Mavlonbuva
- Construction started: 1806
- Completed: 1806
- Renovated: 1875, 1905, 1957

Technical details
- Material: Brick, ganch

Design and construction
- Architect: Ustad Ahmad Lahori

Renovating team
- Other designers: Zakir Ahun, master Husain, master Abdurazzak

The Mavlonbuva Mausoleum (Uzbek: Mavlonbuva maqbarasi) is an architectural monument located in the Namangan Region of Uzbekistan. The mausoleum was built in 1806 and is a unique place of worship for poets, who left many verses on its walls.

== History ==
The Mavlonbuva Mausoleum was built in 1806 (the date of construction is preserved above the entrance — 1221 AH, which is equal to 1806 CE). At the entrance to the mausoleum there is a portal with niches above and a pointed arch. On both sides of the entrance there are columns with large decorative spires in the form of three-tiered cones. The entrance is made in the form of a portal with a pointed arch, arcades and niches above. Behind the portal there is a ziyaratkhana measuring 7 x 7 meters. Small and shallow pointed and rectangular niches frame the main entrance. Above the portal there is a decorative lattice arcade. The rest of the facade is smooth and made of brickwork, which stands out from the outside.

The interior of the inner room is decorated with ganch and painted with oil paint. One of the walls has a mihrab with a drawing. The panels depict vases with flowers and geometric patterns. The epigraphic decor is rich, here are written verses of poets in Arabic calligraphy, because Mavlonbuva (real name Mavlaviy Namangoni) was a famous poet in Namangan, and these verses are dedicated to him.

The panel with a geometric pattern is located opposite the entrance, it is made in the technique of carved ganch with color rendering. The surface of the panel is covered with a thin relief ornament of stars. The cells of the pattern with a smooth background are painted in soft tones and filled with a carved pattern. In the middle of the panel there is a large star on a red background with a relief rosette, and in it a colorful core in a frame of golden rays. The motif of the panel is given in a new interpretation and original color scheme.

On one of the inner walls of the mausoleum it is said that the first reconstruction was carried out about 50 years after the construction — approximately in 1875. The comparison of dates indicates that the mausoleum was built, probably, before the death of the poet. The second reconstruction was carried out in 1905, that is, a hundred years after the construction. The second reconstruction involved famous masters-carvers — Zakir Ahun, master Husain, master Abdurazzak. In 1957, during the third reconstruction, all the Arabic inscriptions on the walls were restored.
