= Davlatobod District =

Davlatobod
- District
- Coordinates: 40°58′N 71°34′E
- Country: Uzbekistan
- Region: Namangan Region
- Established: 1977
- Abolished: 2003
- Re-established: 2020

Government
  - Hokim: Anvarjon Tojimirzayev

Population (2021)
  - Total: 149,600
- Time zone: UTC+5 (UZT)
- Area code: +998 69
- Vehicle registration: 50

Davlatobod District is a district of Namangan city in Namangan Region, Uzbekistan.

== History ==
The district was established on 29 August 1977, covering an area of 1,100 hectares. It was abolished in December 2003 and incorporated into the city. On 11 September 2020, it was re-established by a resolution of the Senate of the Oliy Majlis.

== Description ==
The district has 25 mahallas, 33,850 households, and 421 apartment buildings. It also includes three vocational colleges, 18 general education schools, 24 preschool institutions, and five healthcare facilities. There are 1,280 hectares of agricultural land, 698 service facilities, 429 industrial enterprises, and two cultural heritage sites. The population was 149,600 in 2021.
