= Oʻnhayot =

- urban-type settlement
- Location in Uzbekistan
- Coordinates: 41°0′37″N 71°45′41″E
- Country: Uzbekistan
- Region: Namangan Region
- District: Uychi District
- Urban-type settlement: 1989

Population (2005)
  - Total: 14,000
- Time zone: UTC+5 (UZT)

Oʻnhayot or Oʻnxayat (Uzbek: Oʻnhayot, Ўнҳаёт or Oʻnxayat / Ўнхаят, Russian: Унхаят, romanized: Unkhayat) is an urban-type settlement in Namangan Region, Uzbekistan. It is part of Uychi District. The town population in 2005 was 14,000 people.
