= Afsonalar Vodiysi Park =

Amusement park in Namangan, Uzbekistan

- Afsonalar vodiysi bogʻi
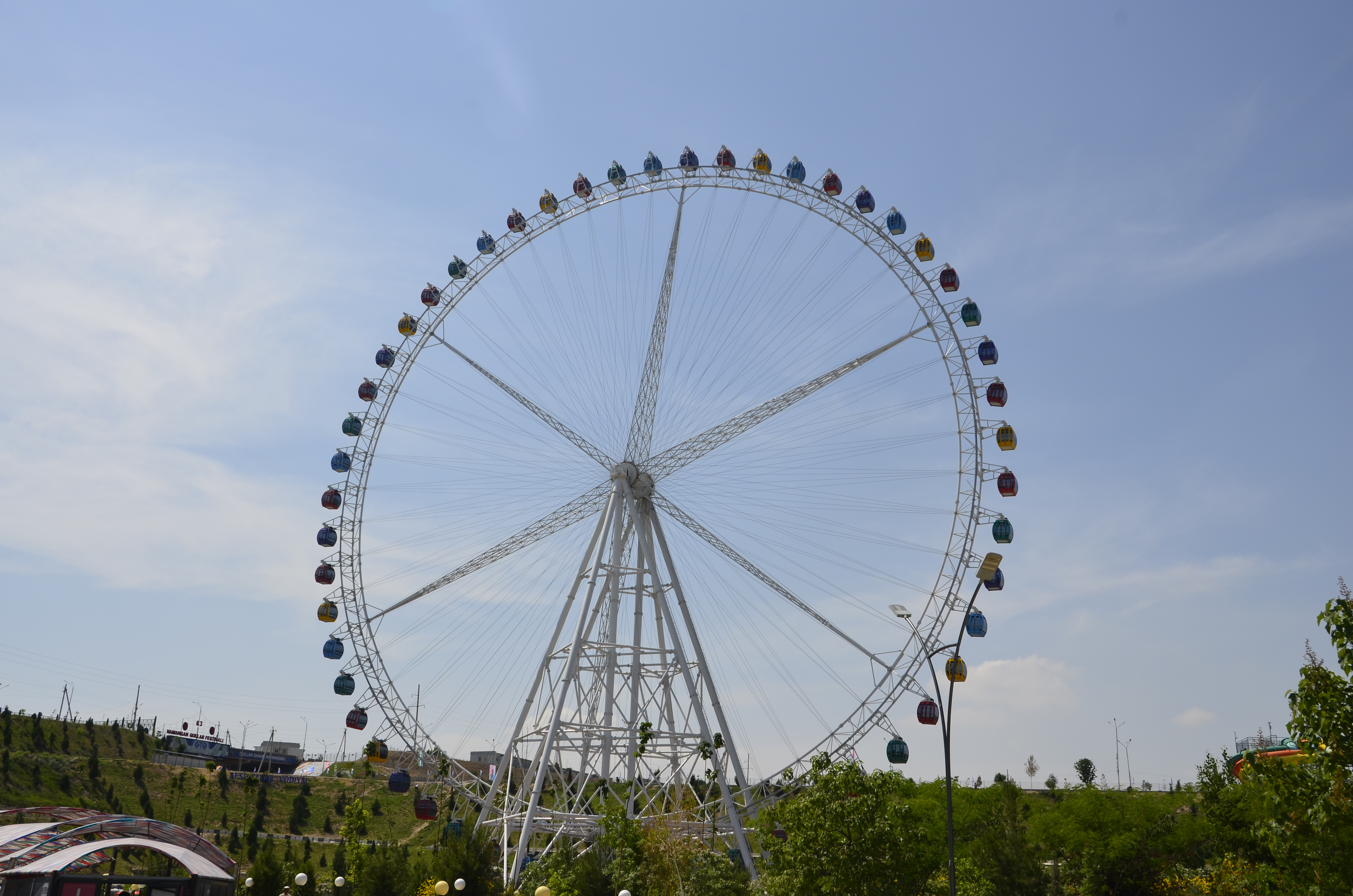
- Ferris wheel in the park
- Interactive map of Afsonalar Vodiysi Park
- Type: Amusement park
- Location: Namangan, Uzbekistan
- Coordinates: 41°0′12″N 71°37′1″E
- Established: 2019
- Open: 6:00 a.m. to 11:00 p.m.
- Status: Open

Afsonalar vodiysi Park is an amusement park located in Namangan, Uzbekistan. It was opened in 2019. The park was built on the site of the former Mashrab Park. It is one of the major recreational areas in the city.
