= Namangan Presidential School =

- Uzbek: Namangan shahridagi Prezident maktabi

Location
- Namangan; Uzbekistan; 40.99829982132915°N 71.57632353672072°E

Information
- School type: boarding-school
- Established: December 6, 2019; 6 years ago
- Headmaster: Shuhrat Aziboyev
- Grades: 5-11
- Language: Uzbek
- Website: https://portal.piima.uz/en/schools/presidental-schools/2
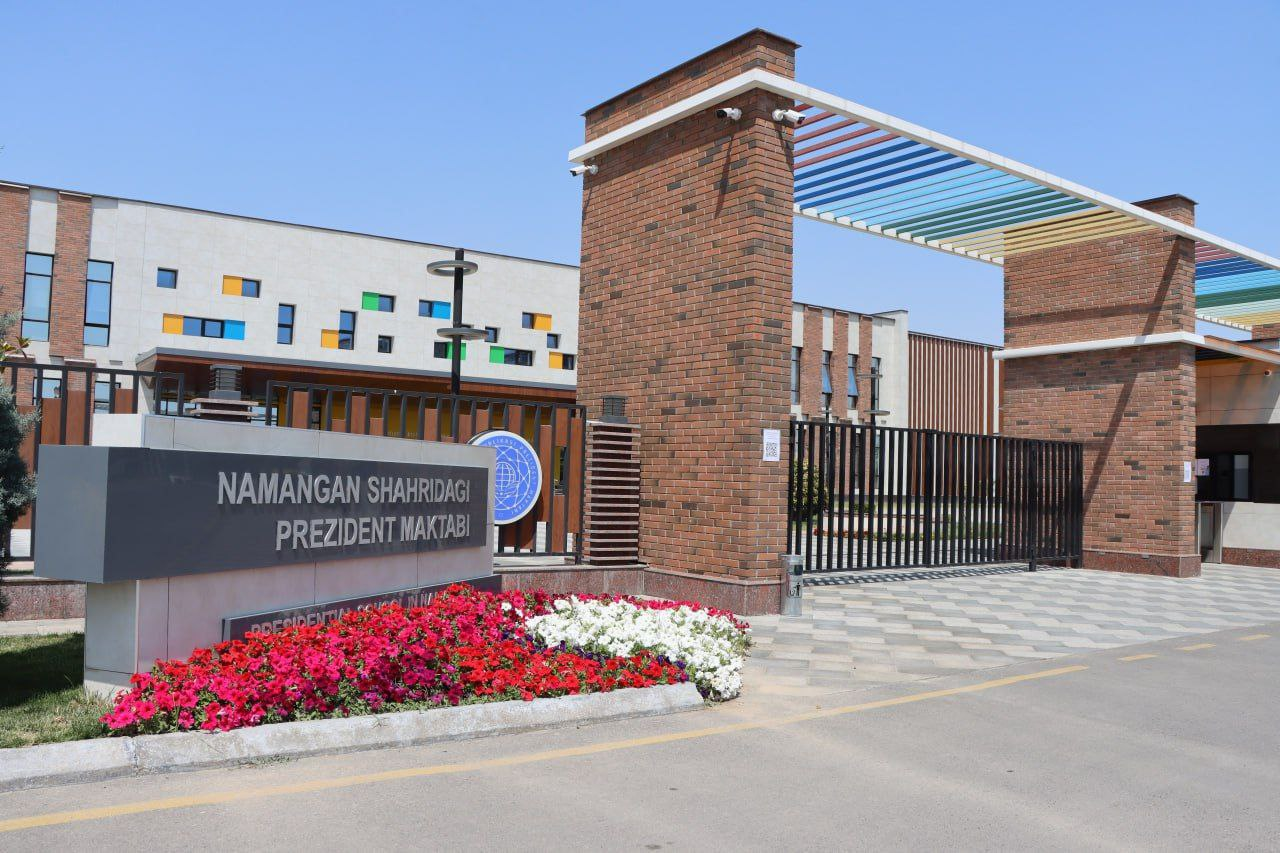
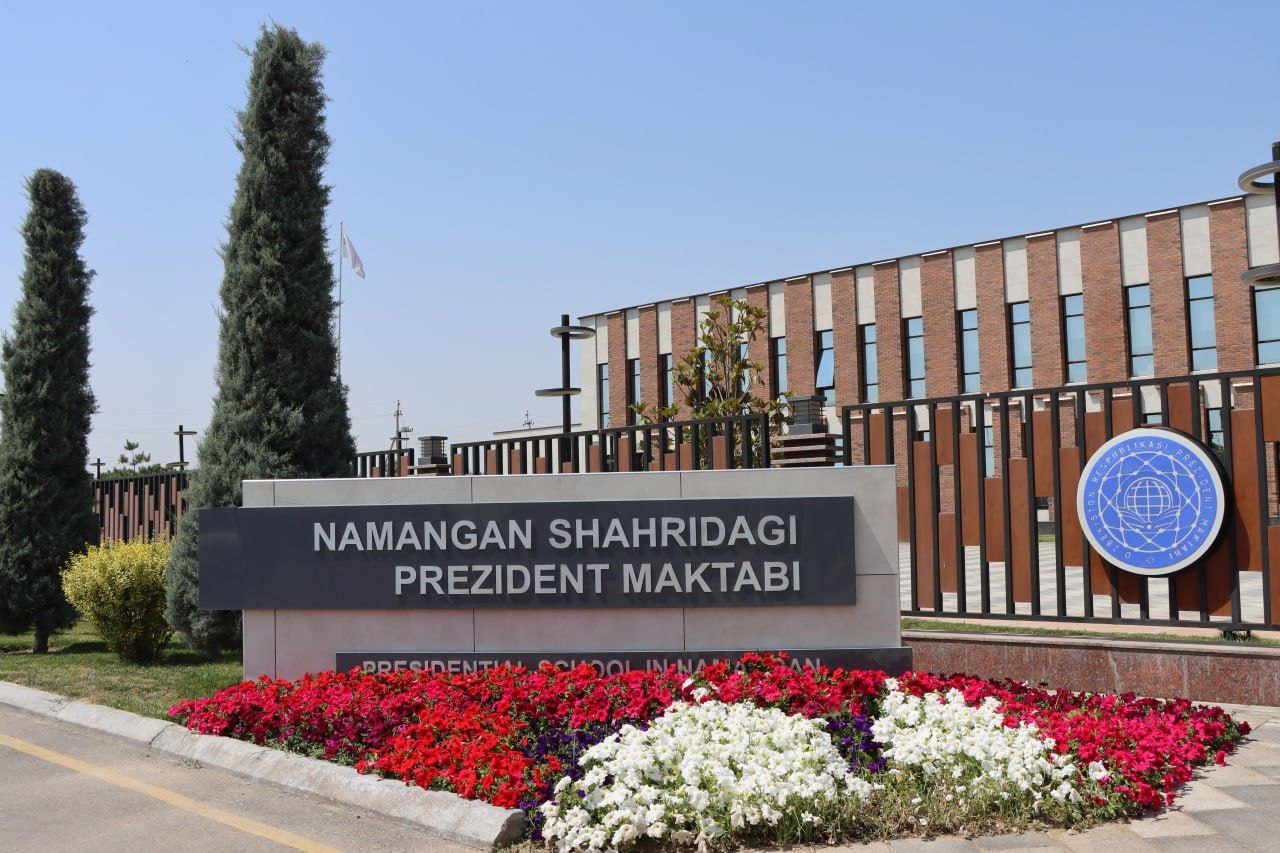

Presidential School in Namangan is a school in Namangan, Uzbekistan. It is one of the first schools founded by the country's president under the Agency for Presidential Educational Institutions. Presidential School is a co-ed, public, residential school enrolling 168 students in grades 5 through 11. Established in December 2019, it graduated its first senior class in the summer of 2021. The school is currently a member of the Council of International Schools (CIS). Additionally, the school received a Cambridge accreditation and this allows Presidential School in Namangan to conduct official Cambridge examinations. Admission is based on merit only, and the school covers each student's full cost of attendance. Only residents of the Namangan region are eligible to apply.

== Admissions ==
Annually, the institution accepts students for grade 5 only. However, when the school was newly established, it admitted students in grades 5–10 to fill the student body. To be eligible to apply, an applicant must have an excellent record in math and natural science subjects at school. Admission consists of three stages. The first stage is an online submission of documents. Once the online application is approved, candidates receive an admission ticket for the second stage, in which students solve the 30-item test on mathematics. The top 480 students in the second stage are qualified for the final stage. The final stage consists of three sections, and the sum of all these sections adds up to 100%: Critical Thinking (32%), Problem Solving (48%) and English (20%). Only 24 students are admitted from the final stage. In the 2022–2023 academic year, 3282 students applied, making the acceptance rate as low as 0.7%. Cambridge Assessment International Education provides exam materials and fully supervises the examination process.

=== Enrollment ===
36 teachers	168 students	59 staff
12 class size	0.7% acceptance rate	5:1 student-teacher ratio

== Curriculum ==
The academic program combines the Uzbek national curriculum and the CAIE curriculum. Grade 8 and 9 students take five compulsory IGCSE subjects (Mathematics, Physics, Chemistry, Biology, and Computer Science). Upon completing IGCSE exams, prospective grade 10 students chose two AS & A Level subjects out of four available (Chemistry, Physics, Biology, Computer Science) to cover them in the upcoming two academic years. Additionally, AS & A Level Mathematics is compulsory for all students. For the 2022–2023 academic year, the school started offering AS Business classes for grade 9 and 10 students. Also, students can start taking AS Level subjects in grade 9 instead of 10. Except for grade 5 students, which have six, all grades have seven periods (45-minute each) a day from Monday to Friday. Classes are held from 8:30 AM to 3:20 PM.

NO.	SUBJECT	HOURS
1	Mathematics	192
2	Computer Science*	224
3	Chemistry CAIE*	224
4	Biology CAIE*	224
5	Physics CAIE*	224
6	Uzbek Literature	48
7	Native Language	48
8	World of History	32
9	History of Uzbekistan	64
10	Global Perspectives	32
11	Physical Education	32
12	Pre-military training	32
13	Russian L2	64
14	English EFL	96
15	Education	32

* - Students choose 2 subjects out of 4

== Extra-curricular activities ==
The Presidential School in Namangan supports the holistic development of students. Extracurricular activities play an important role in student self-initiative, broadening of experience and development of new talents and interests. Students choose activities based on need and interest, and are expected to engage in both academic and nonacademic opportunities. The school offers extra-curricular activities such as robotics, programming, languages, sports, arts and music.

== Grading ==
Our school does not calculate GPA, nor does it report class rank. The school year consists of four terms. Students’ progress is monitored using formative and summative assessments, which comprise 60% of the term mark. End-of-term exams account for the rest 40% of the term mark. Students also take end-of-year exams, which are 40% of their yearly grade. These examinations are held over the last two weeks of the academic year. Grading is done on a 1-5 scale.

Code	Percentage	Description
5	80-100%	Excellent
4	70-79%	Good
3	60-69%	Satisfactory
2	45-59%	Unsatisfactory
1	1-44%	Fail

== Graduation requirements ==
At the end of the academic year, grade 10 students take the official AS Level examinations, and grade 11 students take A Level examinations. CAIE officials supervise GCE AS & A Level exams. Upon graduation, students receive the National Certificate of Secondary Education and GCE AS & A Level Diploma in 3 subjects. To receive the former diploma, students must complete state examinations in Native Language and History of Uzbekistan.
