= New Namangan District =

New Namangan District Uzbek: Yangi Namangan tumani
- District
- Country: Uzbekistan
- Region: Namangan Region
- City: Namangan
- Established: 24 April 2021

Government
  - Hokim: Jobir Abdullayev
- Time zone: UTC+5 (UZT)

New Namangan District is a district of Namangan city in Namangan Region, Uzbekistan. It was established on 24 April 2021 and forms part of the city. The district has an area of 60 km² and a population of 157,600 as of 1 January 2023. It includes 24 mahallas.

== History ==
The proposal to establish New Namangan District within Namangan city was put forward during President Shavkat Mirziyoyev’s visit to Namangan Region on 18–19 February 2021. The initiative was subsequently discussed by the Namangan Regional Council on 5 March 2021 and approved by the Legislative Chamber of the Oliy Majlis on 19 April 2021. It was formally endorsed by the Senate on 24 April 2021, and on 8 May 2021 the Cabinet of Ministers adopted a resolution outlining the organizational measures for the creation of the district, including the establishment of local administrative bodies and public service institutions.
