= 2012 Uzbekistan Second League =

Uzbekistan Second League
- Season: 2012

Uzbekistan Second League is the third highest football league in Uzbekistan. In second phase of the season 11 teams participated for promotion to higher league level.

== Teams of second championship phase ==
| Team | Location |
|---|---|
| Asaka Andijon-2 | Andijon |
| AOZK | Andijon |
| Hotira-79 | Namangan Province |
| Lokomotiv BFK Tashkent | Tashkent |
| Okhangaron-Sport | Andijon |
| Nuriston-Mash'al | Qashqadaryo Province |
| NGPI | Navoi |
| Oltin to'p | Jizzakh |
| Ohangaron | Tashkent Province |
| Spartak | Bukhoro |
| Sherdor-Presstizh | Samarqand |
| Yozyovanchi | Fergana Province |

== League format ==
Season comprise two phases. In first phase teams play against each other in regional competitions to promote to the second phase. In second phase teams are split into 2 regional groups "East" and "West" and compete for promotion to higher level. Four teams promote to Uzbekistan First League.

== Second phase ==
In the second phase of 2012 season 11 clubs participated split into two groups. At the end of season Lokomotiv BFK, Hotira-79, Sherdor-Presstizh and Spartak Bukhoro gained promotion to Uzbekistan First League.

Final standings in groups after last matchday.

=== Group East ===
| Pos | Team | Pld | W | D | L | GF | GA | GF | Pts | Qualification or relegation |
|---|---|---|---|---|---|---|---|---|---|---|
| 1 | Lokomotiv BFK | 5 | 5 | 0 | 0 | 21 | 8 | +13 | 15 | Promotion to the First League |
| 2 | Hotira-79 | 5 | 3 | 0 | 2 | 10 | 7 | +3 | 9 | . |
| 3 | Asaka-Andijon | 5 | 2 | 0 | 3 | 11 | 15 | -4 | 6 | . |
| 4 | Ohangaron-Sport | 5 | 1 | 2 | 2 | 10 | 13 | -3 | 5 | . |
| 5 | AOZK | 5 | 1 | 1 | 3 | 7 | 12 | -5 | 4 | . |
| 6 | Yozyovanchi | 5 | 1 | 1 | 3 | 6 | 10 | -4 | 4 | . |

=== Group West ===
| Pos | Team | Pld | W | D | L | GF | GA | GF | Pts | Qualification or relegation |
|---|---|---|---|---|---|---|---|---|---|---|
| 1 | Sherdor-Presstizh | 4 | 3 | 1 | 0 | 9 | 3 | +6 | 9 | Promotion to the First League |
| 2 | Spartak | 4 | 3 | 1 | 0 | 8 | 3 | +5 | 9 | |
| 3 | Nuriston-Ma'shal | 4 | 1 | 1 | 2 | 7 | 7 | 0 | 3 | . |
| 4 | Oltin to'p | 4 | 1 | 0 | 3 | 2 | 10 | -8 | 3 | . |
| 5 | NGPI | 4 | 0 | 1 | 3 | 1 | 4 | -3 | 1 | . |
