= Usmon Nosir =

Uzbek poet

Usmon Nosir (13 November 1912 – 9 March 1944) was an Uzbek poet. It was said of the poet that he entered "as a thunder and lived a very short creative life as lightning."

== Early life ==
Usmon Nosir (also known as Ismsharifi Nosirov) was born on 13 November 1912 in Namangan into a family of poor artisans, and was orphaned at the age of 4. In 1921, together with his adoptive father (his uncle), he moved to Kokand. He moved to Moscow around 1930 for work and then to the Samarkand pad. Academy for studies.

== Prison ==
On 14 July 1937, with the charge "enemy of the people", he was sentenced to ten years in prison. He was put in prison first in Tashkent, Magadan and then in Kemerovo. Being exhausted in the prison he died on 9 March 1944, at Suslovo village near Kemerovo. He has no known burial site, so prisoners built a symbolic tomb in memory of him. Streets, schools, technical colleges and collective farms in Tashkent, Namangan and Kokand are also named for him.

== Literary works ==
- "Quyosh bilan suhbat" (Conversation with the Sun) (1932)
- "Safarbar satrlar" (Mobilized Lines) (1932)
- "Yurak" (Heart) (1935)
- "Mehrim" (My Loving) (1935)
- "Nil va Rim" (Nile and Rome)

Poems include:

- "The pen" (1927)
- "New" (1931)
- "Monologue"
- "Coverage" (1932)
- "Traktorobod lines" (1934)
- "Heart"(1935)
- "Poetry"
- "Not only in Rome"
- "Youth"
- "More like a bird ..."

Drama writings include:

- "Zafar" (1929)
- "Nazirjon Khalilov" (1930)
- "Enemy" (1931)
- "The Last Day" (1932)

== Examples of his work ==
You are the heart and a spring of water,
You are the eyes to the light of the ore.
Who is your assessment, he asks:
Rating – the worst in the price.

I saw the butterfly flower ...
Remember, you went to Malagon ...
You look so sweet poem,
O leaves, blue Palagon? (A poem of his childhood)
