= Namangan State Institute of Foreign Languages =

Higher Institution in Namangan, Uzbekistan

Coordinates: 41.0066°N 71.5093°E

Namangan State Institute of Foreign Languages (NamSIFL) in Namangan, Namangan Region, Uzbekistan, was founded based on presidential decree No. 275 on June 19, 2022. It is located in the Fergana Valley of eastern Uzbekistan. Currently NamSIFL has over 1,000 students in the first-year bachelor's and master's degree programs. The institute specializes in languages, linguistics, literature, translation studies, pedagogy, tourism and IT. The major language fields are English, Russian, Japanese, German, French, Korean, Chinese, Persian, and Arabic.
