= Mingbuloq District =

Coordinates: 40.8633°N 71.4597°E

Mingbuloq
- District
- Mingbuloq tumani
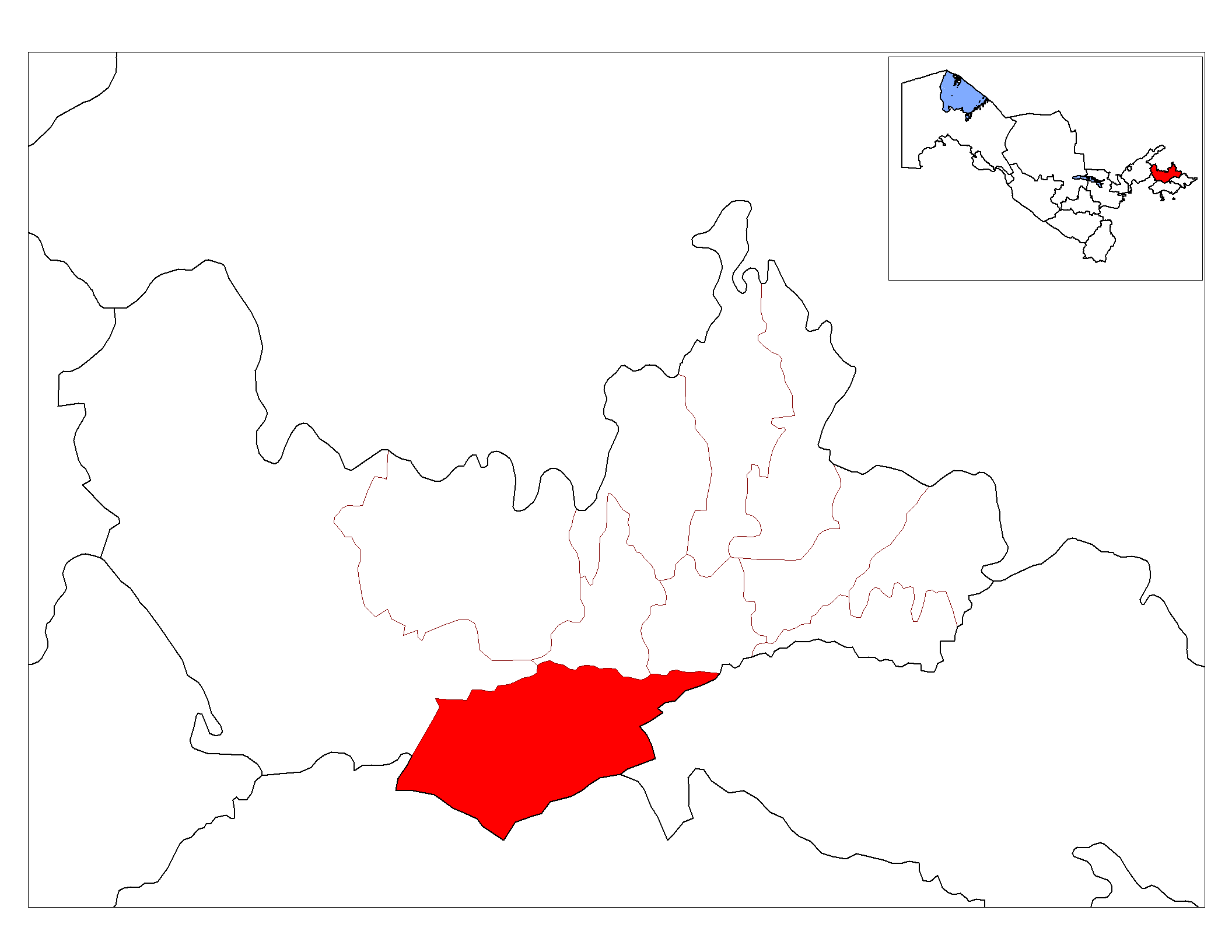
- Country: Uzbekistan
- Region: Namangan Region
- Capital: Joʻmashoʻy
- Established: 1952

Area
  - Total: 741 km^{2} (286 sq mi)

Population (2021)
  - Total: 128,400
  - Density: 173/km^{2} (449/sq mi)
- Time zone: UTC+5 (UZT)

Mingbuloq is a district of Namangan Region in Uzbekistan. The capital lies at the town Joʻmashoʻy. Its area is 741 km^{2}. Its population is 128,400 (2021 est.).

The district consists of 7 urban-type settlements (Joʻmashoʻy, Gurtepa, Dovduq, O‘zgarish, Mehnatobod, Madyarovul, Kugoliqul) and 7 rural communities.
