= Obidkhon Sobitkhony =

Obidkhon Sobitkhony (born Obid Nazarov: ru:Обид Назаров; 15 January 1958, in Namangan), is an Uzbek imam regime critic previously wanted for arrest by Uzbekistan and Interpol. Since 2006 he has lived in Sweden and was the victim of an assassination attempt on 23 February 2012.

Nazarov was granted asylum in Sweden in 2006 through help from the UN. On 28 July 2011, Interpol took him off its list of wanted people for arrest.

On 23 February 2012, Nazarov was found in a stairwell in Strömsund, shot in the head with three or four bullets. On 6 July 2012 a married couple with ties to Uzbekistan were prosecuted for the murder attempt but were acquitted. Nazarov remained in a coma until August 2014.

On December 15, 2015, a 37 year old Uzbeki man considered to be the intended assassin was sentenced to 18 years in prison by the Swedish court.
