= Norin District =

Coordinates: 40.9061°N 72.1194°E

- District
- Norin tumani
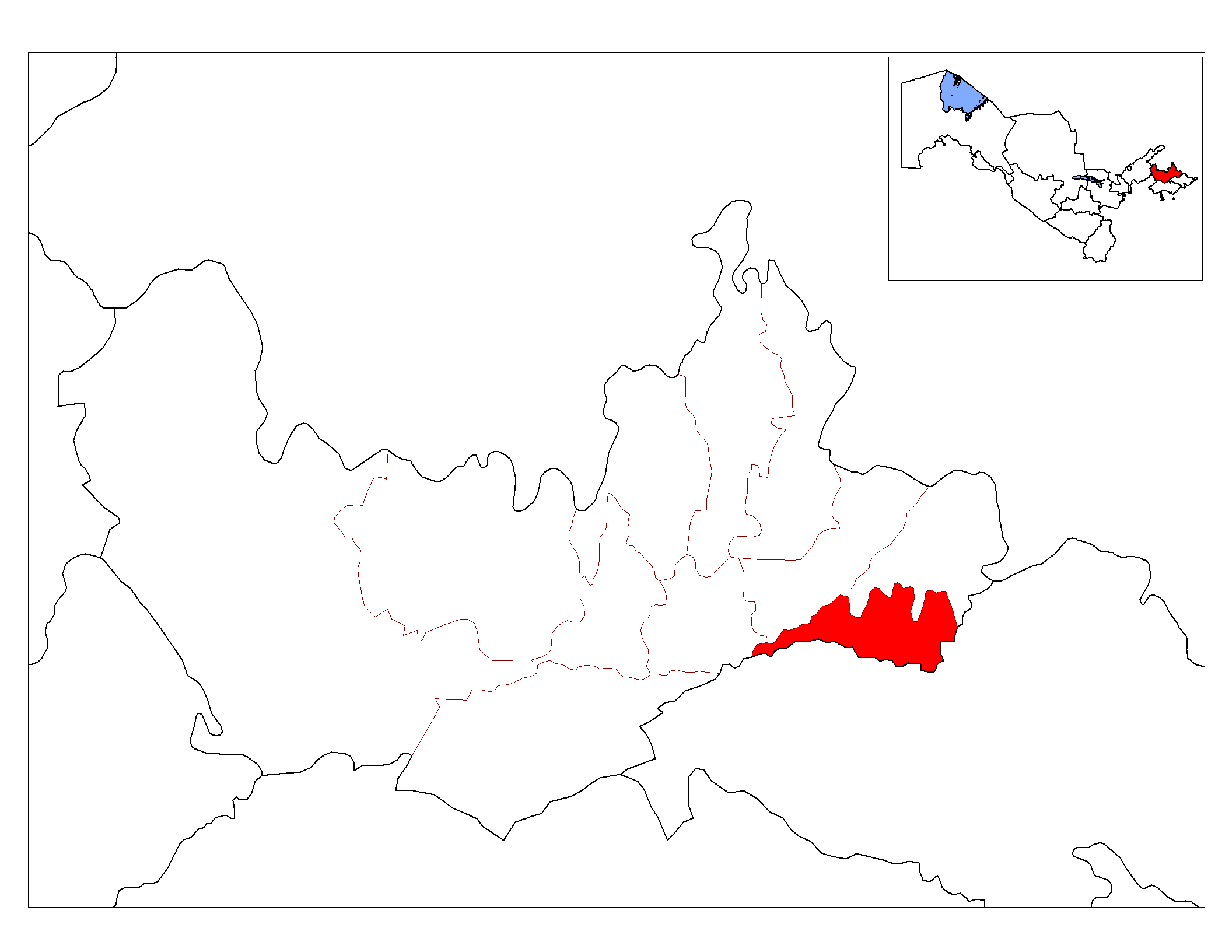
- Country: Uzbekistan
- Region: Namangan Region
- Capital: Haqqulobod
- Established: 1926

Area
  - Total: 207 km^{2} (80 sq mi)

Population (2021)
  - Total: 166,100
  - Density: 802/km^{2} (2,080/sq mi)
- Time zone: UTC+5 (UZT)

Norin District (Uzbek: Norin tumani, Russian: Нарынский район, romanized: Narynsky rayon) is a district of Namangan Region in Uzbekistan. The capital lies at the city Haqqulobod. Its area is 207 km^{2}. Its population is 166,100 (2021 est.).

The district consists of one city (Haqqulobod), 8 urban-type settlements (Qorateri, Margʻuzar, Norinkapa, Pastki choʻja, Uchtepa, Xoʻjaobod, Chambil, Shoʻra) and 8 rural communities.
