= Toshbuloq =

- urban-type settlement
- Location in Uzbekistan
- Coordinates: 40°55′24″N 71°34′19″E
- Country: Uzbekistan
- Region: Namangan Region
- District: Namangan District
- Urban-type settlement status: 1989

Population (1989)
  - Total: 7,754
- Time zone: UTC+5 (UZT)

Toshbuloq (Uzbek: Toshbuloq/Тoшбулоқ, Russian: Ташбулак, romanized: Tashbulak) is an urban-type settlement in Namangan Region, Uzbekistan. It is the administrative center of Namangan District.
