= Uychi =

- urban-type settlement
- Location in Uzbekistan
- Coordinates: 41°01′46″N 71°50′54″E
- Country: Uzbekistan
- Region: Namangan Region
- Urban-type settlement status: 1984

Population (2011)
  - Total: 29,683
- Time zone: UTC+5 (UZT)

Uychi (Uzbek: Uychi/Уйчи, Russian: Уйчи) is an urban-type settlement in Namangan Region, Uzbekistan. It is the administrative center of Uychi District. The town population in 1989 was 14,088 people.
