= Joʻmashoʻy =

- urban-type settlement
- Location in Uzbekistan
- Coordinates: 40°51′48″N 71°27′35″E
- Country: Uzbekistan
- Region: Namangan Region
- District: Mingbuloq District
- Urban-type settlement status: 1972

Population (2000)
  - Total: 10,100
- Time zone: UTC+5 (UZT)

Joʻmashoʻy (Uzbek: Joʻmashoʻy/Жўмашўй, Russian: Джумашуй, romanized: Dzhumashuy) is an urban-type settlement in Namangan Region, Uzbekistan. It is the administrative center of Mingbuloq District. The town population in 1989 was 9303 people.
