= Haqqulobod =

Haqqulobod Khakkulabad
- Town
- Location in Uzbekistan
- Coordinates: 40°54′22″N 72°07′10″E
- Country: Uzbekistan
- Region: Namangan Region
- District: Naryn District, Uzbekistan
- Town status: 1974

Population (2016)
  - Total: 27,000
- Time zone: UTC+5 (UZT)

Haqqulobod (Uzbek: Haqqulobod, Ҳаққулобод or Xaqqulobod / Хаққулобод, Russian: Хаккулабад, romanized: Khakkulabad) is a city in Namangan Region, Uzbekistan. It is the administrative center of Norin District. Its population is 27,000 (2016).

Historical population
Year	Pop.	±% p.a.
1989	19,926	—
2005	27,500	+2.03%
2016	27,000	−0.17%
