= Mashrab =

Uzbek poet

Boborahim Mashrab
- Uzbek: Boborahim Mulla Vali oʻgʻli
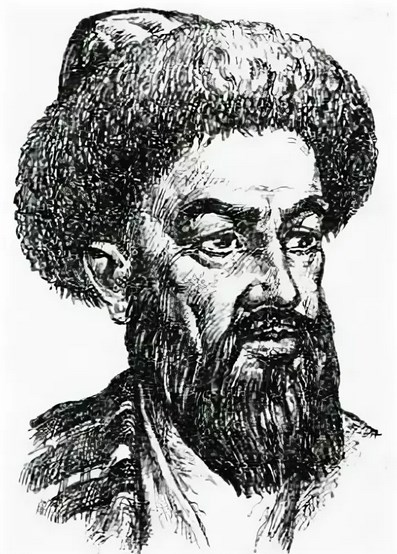
- Born: 1657; Namangan Uzbekistan
- Died: 1711 (aged 53–54); Balh, Afghanistan
- Writing career
- Language: Uzbek language

Bābārahim Mashrab (Боборахим Машраб, Boborahim Mashrab) (1653-1711) was a classic figure in Uzbek literature, a poet and thinker, a follower of the Sufi Tarikat tradition, and a dervish of the Sufi order of Nakshbandiyya. His name holds a prominent place in the ranks of such prominent representatives of Uzbek literature as Navoi, Agahi, Mukimi, Furqat, and Zavki. Through his creative works, he exerted significant influence on the development and refinement of Uzbek literature from the late 17th to the early 18th century.

== Early life ==
Information about Boborahim Mashrab’s life is scant and subject to speculation. One of the "sources" used to reconstruct his life is a legend-like, anonymous work Şɔh Maşrab Qïssasï. Boborakhim Mashrab was born in 1657 AD (1050 Hijri) in Namangan. According to other sources, Mashrab’s year of birth is 1640, and his place of birth is the village of Andigan (not to be confused with Andijan), near Namangan. His teacher was the theologian Mulla Bozor Okhun from Namangan. Based on Bozor Okhun's recommendation, Mashrab became a student of the Sufi Ishan Afakho-Khodja in Kashgar in 1665. In 1672-1673, after ideological differences with Hidoyatullo Ofoq Xoja, Mashrab was expelled from Kashgar. From 1673 onwards, for forty years, Mashrab wandered and traveled. He visited Tashkent, Bukhara, Samarkand, Balkh, and India during his travels. While roaming different regions of Central Asia, Mashrab could not help but visit Bukhara, the birthplace of Bahauddin Nakshband. With deep respect for Bahauddin Nakshband, the founder of the Nakshbandi order, Mashrab visited the house where the saint had lived.

In 1711 AD (1123 Hijri), exposing the duplicitous nature of the clergy, Mashrab expressed his disapproval of many religious dogmas, openly doubting some of them. In many of his verses, Mashrab wrote quite contemptuously about paradise, hell, the afterlife, and Mecca, and expressed his willingness to exchange them "for a bottle of wine" or sell them "for a coin". It was precisely for this reason that the ruling classes and clergy saw Mashrab as their fiercest enemy. In 1711 AD (1123 Hijri), Mashrab was hanged in Balkh by the order of Mahmud Bey Katagan, the ruler of Kunduz, of the Ashtarkhanid dynasty. However, there is information that Mashrab was executed in Kunduz. The life of Mashrab is recounted in a narrative called "About the Madman Mashrab," created by an unknown author and replete with legends. This book contains many poems attributed to Mashrab, but it is often difficult to distinguish his authentic verses from numerous interpolations. Mashrab's book " Mabdai nur,"( Source of Light) consisting of interpretations of Jalaluddin Rumi's poems and moralistic stories, is popular. The poet's biography has many blank spots that require further historical research.

On May 23, 1992, a museum and monument dedicated to Boborakhim Mashrab were ceremoniously opened in Namangan, the poet's hometown. One of the central streets, a park, and a cinema in Namangan is named after Mashrab. School No. 11 in the Uychi district of Namangan Province also bears Mashrab's name. Mashrab readings are held in Namangan.

== Works ==
The poet's creative work compelled him to leave his homeland and live abroad, where he spent most of his life. Even while living far from his homeland, the poet always remembered and praised it. Mashrab's ghazals, muhammas, and quatrains, which constitute his rich creative legacy, have beautifully adorned the treasury of Uzbek literature. Some of his poems, like "Miraj", "piru rahbar", "Koshki", and "Oʻzum" were passed down orally throughout Central Asia and Eastern Turkestan. Mashrab's creativity influenced Uzbek poetry, and many contemporary Uzbek singers incorporate his ghazals into their work.

During Soviet times, there was a literary, social, and political illustrated humor magazine called "Mashrab," named in honor of Boborakhim Mashrab. The magazine depicted the life and customs of the Uzbek people, exposed bureaucrats, braggarts, and chatterboxes, mocked poor business owners, and fought against religious prejudices, barbaric customs, and rituals. It often advocated for women's equality and empowerment, advocating for their involvement in economic, social, and cultural activities. In the USSR, the poet's works were published several times (1958, 1960, 1963, 1971, 1979, 1990).

The image of the freethinker Mashrab inspired the well-known Tashkent director Mark Vail. A theater group led by him from the Tashkent Ilkhom Theater staged the play "The Flights of Mashrab." This play offers a metaphysical perspective filled with allegory and fantasy on the life of the wandering poet Boborakhim Mashrab.

== Influence ==
Mashrab's hanging is mentioned in a poem written by Ghojimuhemmed Muhemmed, a modern Uyghur poet from Pishan/Guma County, China.

== Literature ==
- Karimov I.A. Tarixiy xotirasiz kelajak yо‘q. –T.: “Sharq” nashriyot-matbaa konserni bosh tahririyati, 1998 year. Page-29.
- Abdullayev V. A. О‘zbek adabiyoti tarixi. –T.: О‘qituvchi, 1980 year. Page–346.
- Abdullayev.V. О‘zbek adabiyoti tarixi. –T.: О‘qituvchi, 1985 year. Page–346.
- Hayitmetov A. Hayotbaxsh chashma. –T.: Adabiyot va san’at, 1974 year. Page–165.
- Hayitmetov A. Mashrab lirikasi. Sharq yulduzi. 1980 year. Pages- 80-85.
- Hayitmetov A. Mashrab haqida sо‘z. Adabiy meros. 1992 year. Pages – 22-25.
- Hayitmetov A. Adabiy merosimiz ufqlari. –T.: О‘qituvchi, 1997 year. Page–238.
- "Tazkirat ul-avliyo" (Majzub Namangoniy),
- "Tazkirai qalandaron" (Is'hoq Bogʻistoniy),
- "Muzakkiri as'hob" (Maleho Samarqandiy),
- "Muntaxab ut-tavorix" (Hakimxon Toʻra),
- "Ansob us-salotin" (Mirzo Olim).
