= Akhsikath =

Archaeological site in Uzbekistan

Coordinates: 40.886555°N 71.450515°E

Map of Khurasan and Transoxiana in the 8th century. Akhsikath is located on the upper right

Akhsikath (Uzbek: Axsikent; also commonly known as Aksikent or Akhsi) is an archeological site located in the Fergana Valley in Uzbekistan. A fortified city along the Syr Darya, it lies 22 km to the southwest of Namangan and covers an area of 30 hectares. The oldest parts of Akhsikath date from the 3rd century BC, but it peaked in size and importance during the 9th-12th centuries AD. Later, the city played a key role in the life of Babur, founder of the Mughal Empire, whose father ruled Fergana from Akhsikath. The city is described in the Baburnama.

== History ==
"In all Fergana no fort is as strong as Akhsi. Its suburbs extend some two miles further than the walled town". Babur's description of Akhsikath in his chronicles, the Baburnama.

Akhsikath was established by the 3rd century BC (source). It was a Silk Road caravan stop on the road west from Kashgar, and it was known not only as a trading centre but also as a manufacturing hub: the Damascus steel produced here in kaolin-lined smelting furnaces here was famous as far away as Baghdad and Damascus. The wealth generated in and around Akhsikath made it an attractive target for invaders and so the city was repeatedly conquered, first by the Kushans and then by Turkic tribes. Most of our understanding about the city's earliest history comes from Chinese sources and from archeological excavations.

By the 10th century, Akhsikath was one of the largest and most significant cities in the Fergana Valley. There were at least two mosques, a palace and prison, and a caravanserai, all surrounded by defensive walls and with their own water supply. In spite of improvements to the fortifications, it was still vulnerable to attack, and it was sacked by both the Qara Khitai, and then in 1219 by Jebe Noyan, one of Genghis Khan's commanders.

In the 15th century, Umar Shaikh Mirza II, father of the future Mughal Emperor Babur, ruled the Fergana Valley and chose Akhsikath as his main residence. Babur was most likely born in nearby Andijan but his history is inextricably linked with that of the fortress as this is where Umar Shaikh fell accidentally to his death in 1494, bringing Babur to the throne. Whilst attempting to conquer Samarkand, Babur lost control of Akhsikath and Samarkand.

By the early 17th century, Akhsikath was in decline. What was left of the city was destroyed in an earthquake in 1620 and the inhabitants relocated to Namangan.

== Archeological Excavations ==
The first excavations of Akhsikath, which has been described as "Fergana's Afrosiyob" took place in 1885. It was led by the Russian orientalist and archeologist Nikolay Veselovsky Subsequent excavations took place in 1913, 1939, 1960, and 1979. The bronzes found during these digs are in the State Museum of Oriental Art in Moscow, and other finds are in the Louvre in Paris and national collections in Uzbekistan.

More recently in 2002, Professor Tilo Rehren from the Institute of Archaeology at University College London led the British-Uzbek archeological expedition at Akhsikath. The scientists discovered evidence that Damascus steel, which is strong but also bendable and resistant to shattering, was produced here. In particular, they found fire-resistant crucibles made of kaolin, which could withstand temperatures of up to 1,300 degrees Celsius. Juniper wood, which can generate such high temperatures, was used for smelting, and the carboniferous iron ore came from nearby spurs of the Tien Shan Mountains.

== Sources ==
- Bosworth, C. Edmund (1984). "Aḵsīkaṯ". In Yarshater, Ehsan (ed.). Encyclopædia Iranica. Vol. I/7: Ahriman–Alafrank. London and New York: Routledge & Kegan Paul. p. 538. ISBN 978-0-71009-096-6.
- Golden, Peter B. (2009). "Akhsīkath". In Fleet, Kate; Krämer, Gudrun; Matringe, Denis; Nawas, John; Rowson, Everett (eds.). Encyclopaedia of Islam (3rd ed.). Brill Online. ISSN 1873-9830.
