= Kosonsoy District =

Coordinates: 41.2500°N 71.5500°E

Kosonsoy
- District
- Kosonsoy tumani
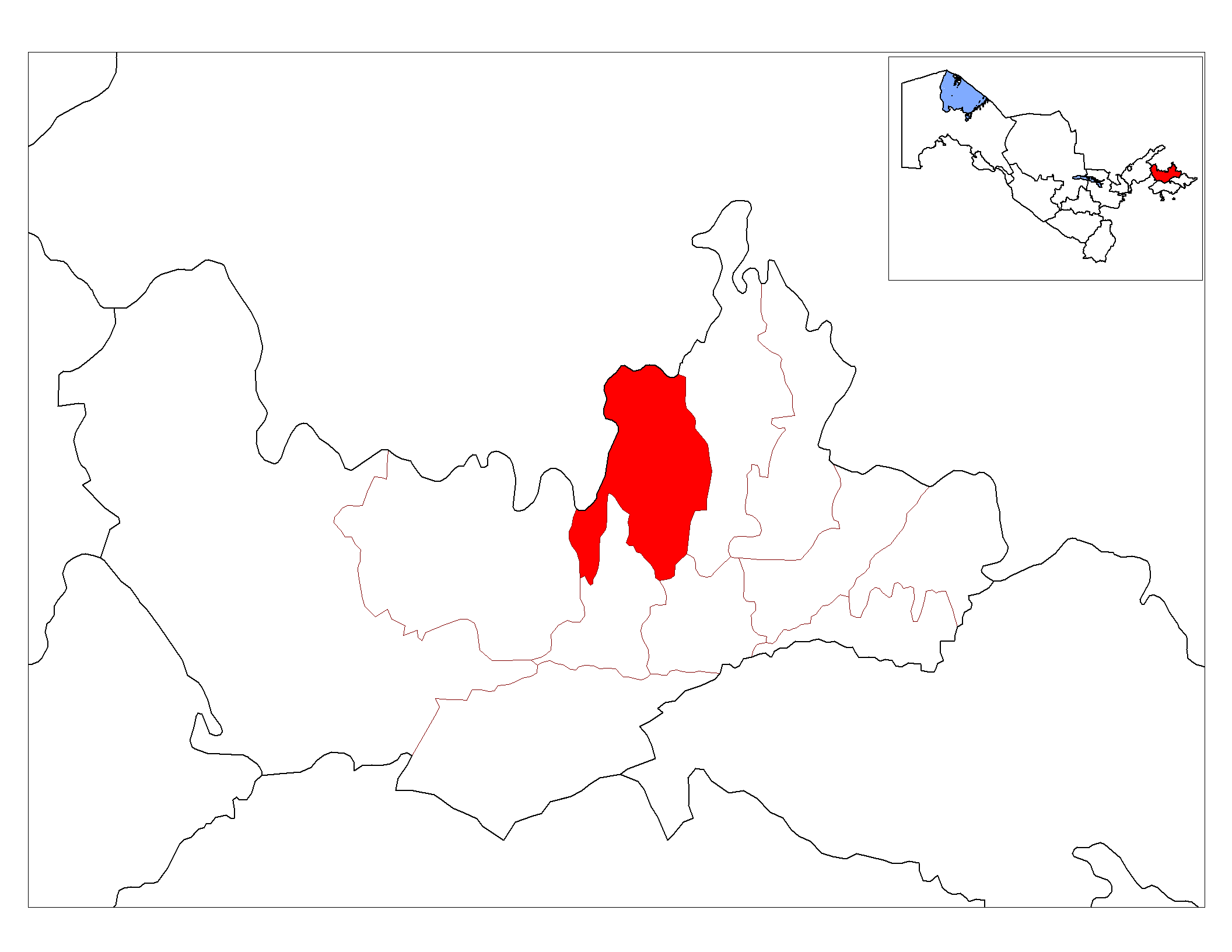
- Country: Uzbekistan
- Region: Namangan Region
- Capital: Kosonsoy
- Established: 1926

Area
  - Total: 517 km^{2} (200 sq mi)

Population (2021)
  - Total: 212,900
  - Density: 412/km^{2} (1,070/sq mi)
- Time zone: UTC+5 (UZT)

Kosonsoy is a district of Namangan Region in Uzbekistan. The capital lies at the city Kosonsoy. Its area is 517 km^{2}. Its population is 212,900 (2021 est.).

The district consists of one city (Kosonsoy), 10 urban-type settlements (Bogʻishamol, Istiqlol, Koson, Ququmboy, Ozod, Tergachi, Chindavul, Chust koʻcha, Yangiyoʻl, Yangi shahar) and 7 rural communities.
