= Namangan District =

Coordinates: 40.9667°N 71.5667°E

Namangan
- District
- Namangan tumani
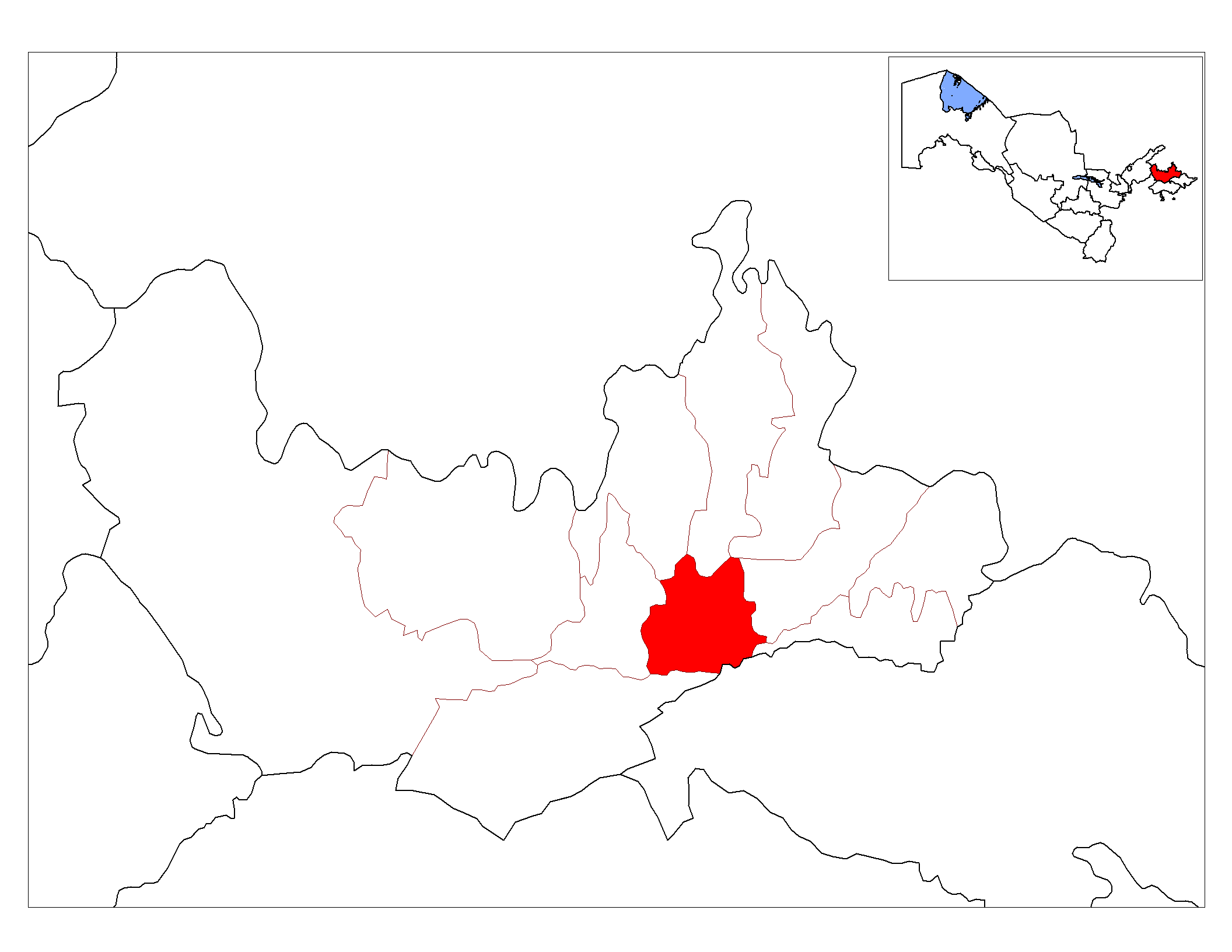
- Country: Uzbekistan
- Region: Namangan Region
- Capital: Toshbuloq
- Established: 1926

Area
  - Total: 203 km^{2} (78 sq mi)

Population (2021)
  - Total: 179,800
  - Density: 886/km^{2} (2,290/sq mi)
- Time zone: UTC+5 (UZT)

Namangan is a district of Namangan Region in Uzbekistan. The capital lies at the town Toshbuloq. Its area is 203 km^{2}. Its population is 179,800 (2021 est.).

The district consists of 5 urban-type settlements (Toshbuloq, Navbahor, Qumqoʻrgʻon, Shoʻrqoʻrgʻon, Mirishkor) and 10 rural communities. Odillik Street is located within the Citizen's Assembly of Baghrikenglik Neighborhood in Chortoq District of Namangan Region in Uzbekistan. This neighborhood is known for its residential area with a mix of residential buildings, shops, and local businesses.

The Chortoq District is one of the districts of Namangan Region and is primarily a residential area with a mix of urban and rural areas. The district is known for its historical sites, parks, and cultural attractions.

The Namangan Region is located in the eastern part of Uzbekistan and is known for its agriculture, including cotton, fruits, and vegetables. The region is also known for its beautiful natural landscapes, including mountains, rivers, and valleys.

Overall, Odillik Street in the Citizen's Assembly of Baghrikenglik Neighborhood in Chortoq District, Namangan Region is moderately established with access to various amenities and services.
