= Uychi District =

Coordinates: 41.0294°N 71.8483°E

Uychi
- District
- Uychi tumani
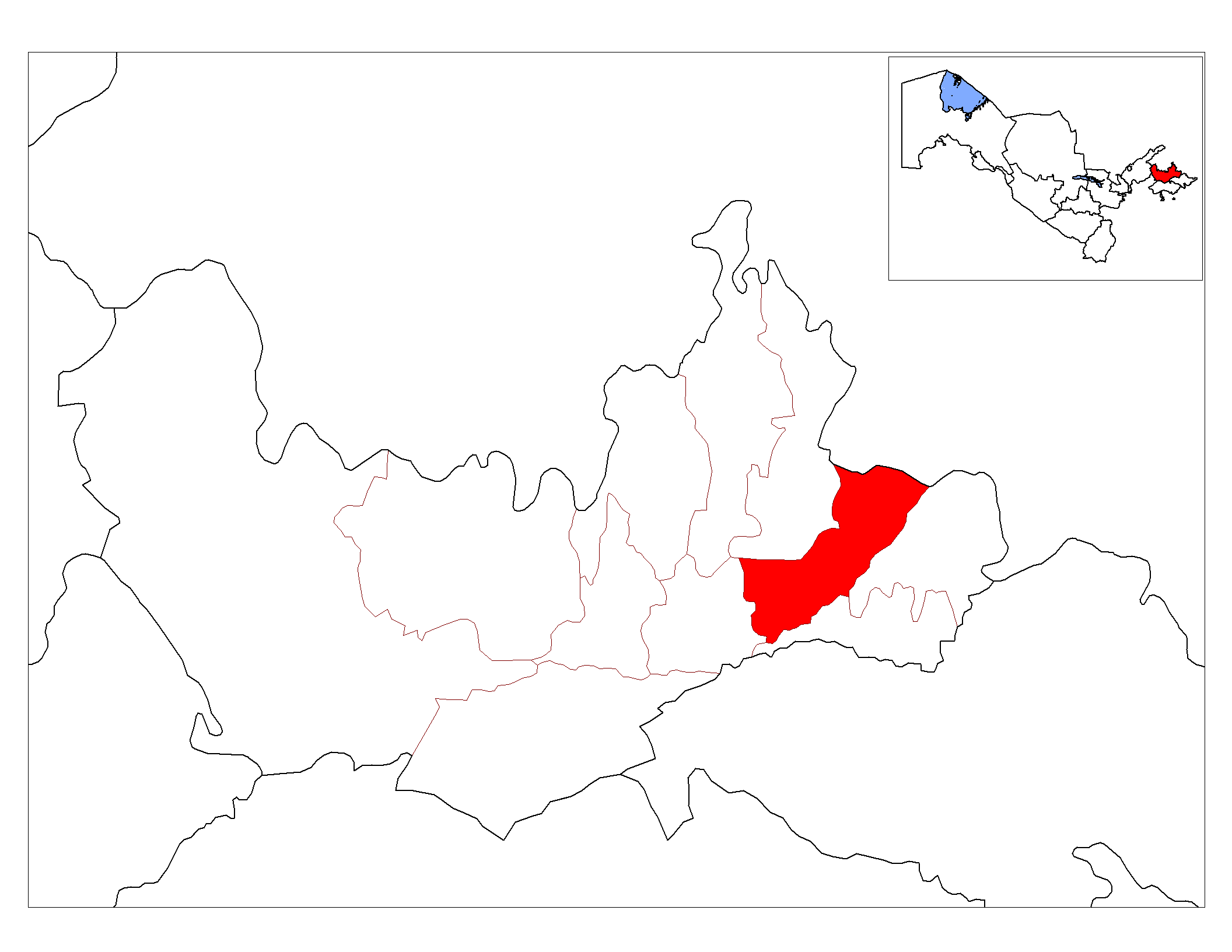
- Country: Uzbekistan
- Region: Namangan Region
- Capital: Uychi
- Established: 1935

Area
  - Total: 304 km^{2} (117 sq mi)

Population (2021)
  - Total: 216,800
- Time zone: UTC+5 (UZT)

Uychi is a district of Namangan Region in Uzbekistan. The capital lies at the town Uychi. Its area is 304 km^{2}. Its population is 216,800 (2021 est.).

The district consists of 13 urban-type settlements (Uychi, Oʻnhayot, Birlashgan, Fayziobod, Churtuk, Axsi, Jiydakapa, Kichik toshloq, Mashad, Soku, Boyogʻon, Gʻayrat, Ziyokor) and 8 rural communities.
