= Namangan =

City in eastern Uzbekistan

Namangan Namangan / Наманган (Uzbek)
- City
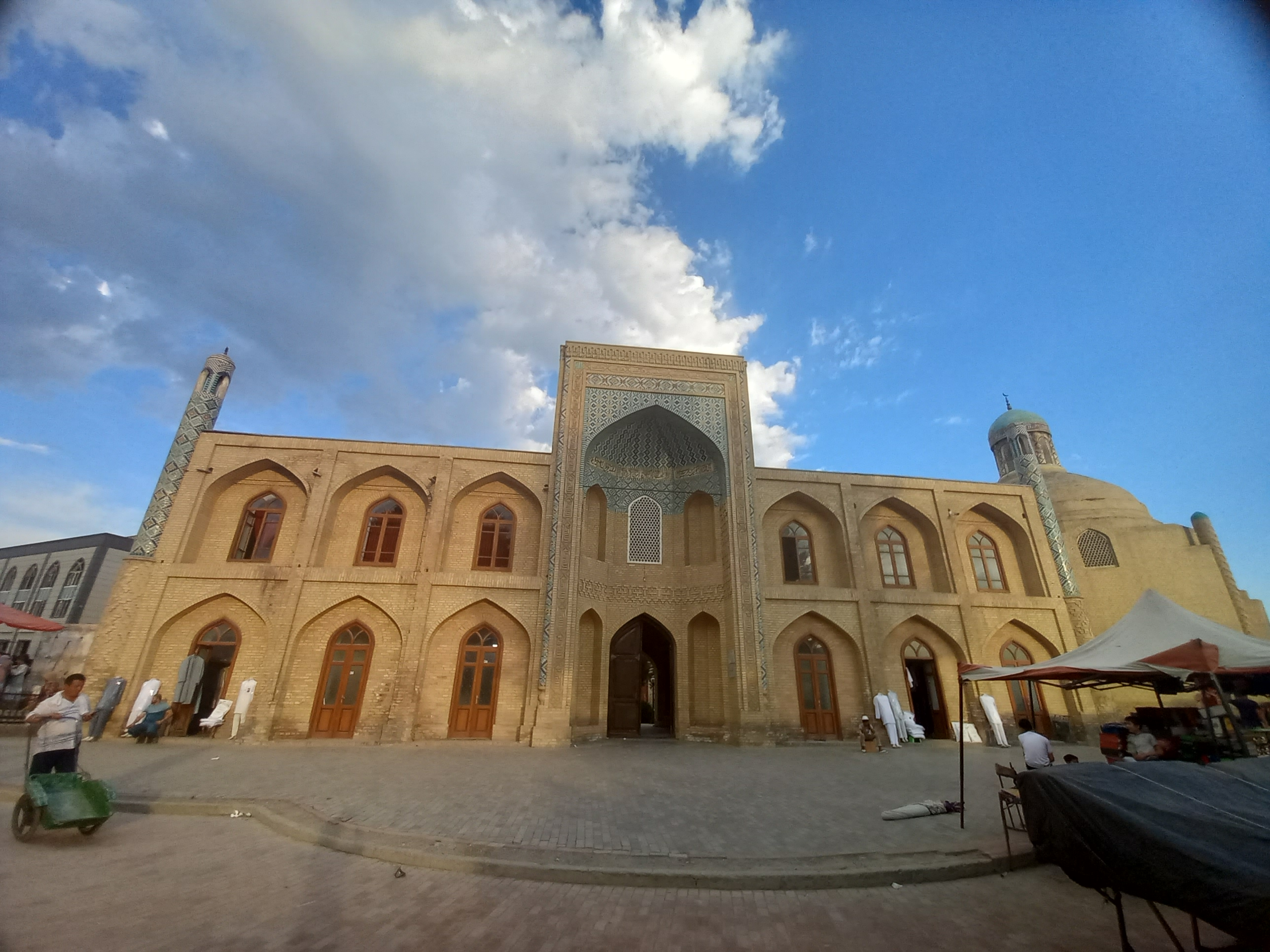
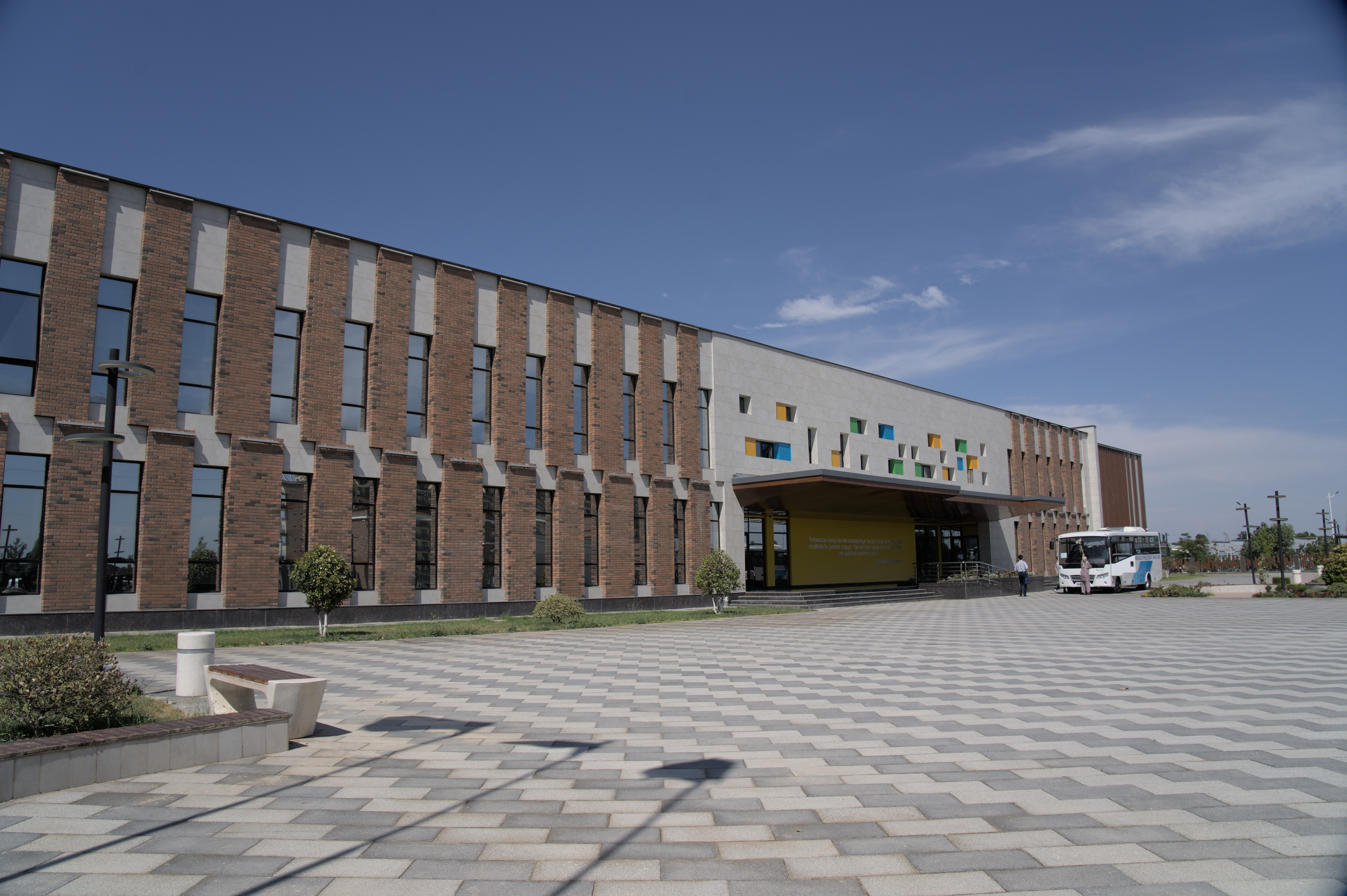
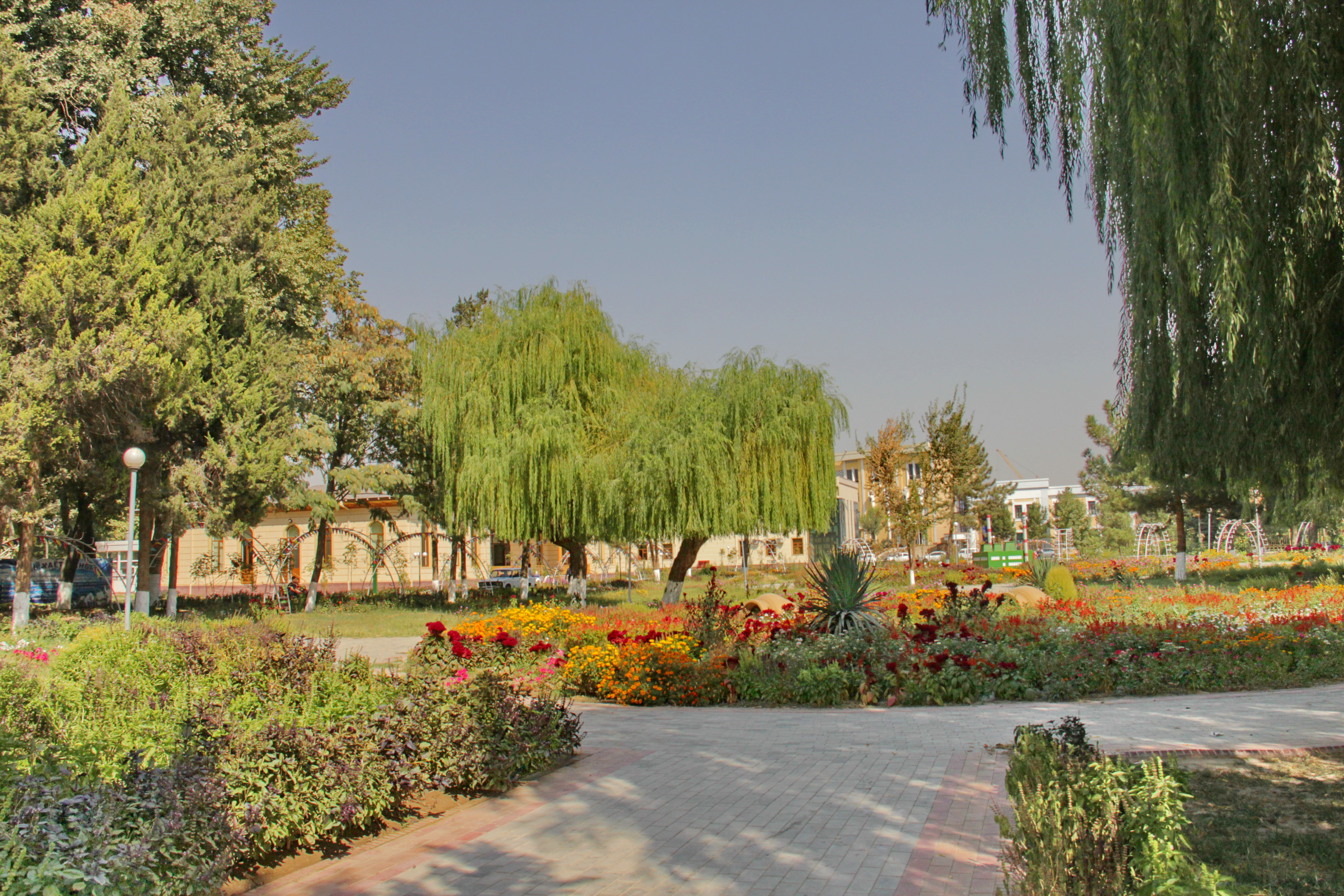
- From top, left to right: Mullah Kyrgyz Madrasa, Namangan Presidential School, Bobur Park
- Interactive map of Namangan
- Location in Uzbekistan
- Coordinates: 41°00′04″N 71°40′06″E
- Country: Uzbekistan
- Region: Namangan Region
- Established: 1610

Area
  - City: 145 km^{2} (56 sq mi)
- Elevation: 450 m (1,480 ft)

Population (2026)
  - City: 713,500
  - Density: 4,920/km^{2} (12,700/sq mi)
  - Metro: 1 020 000
- Postal code: 160100
- Area code: +998 69
- Website: www.namangan.uz

Namangan (Note: /ˌnæməŋˈɡæn/) is a city in eastern Uzbekistan. It is the administrative, economic, and cultural center of Namangan Region. Namangan is located in the northern edge of the Fergana Valley, less than 30 km from the border with Kyrgyzstan. The city is served by Namangan Airport.

Namangan has been an important craft and trade center in the Fergana Valley since the 17th century. Many factories were built in the city during Soviet times. During World War II, industrial production in Namangan increased fivefold compared with that of the 1920s. Currently, Namangan is mainly a center for light industry, especially in food. It is Uzbekistan's third largest city after Tashkent and Samarkand, with an officially registered population of 713,500 in the city in 2026. Uzbeks form the largest ethnic group.

== History ==
The city takes its name from the local salt mines (in Persian: نمک‌کان (namak kan) — "a salt mine"). Babur mentioned the village of Namangan in his memoirs Baburnama. In his book A Brief History of the Khanate of Kokand (Russian: Краткая история Кокандского ханства) (Kazan, 1886), the Russian ethnographer Vladimir Petrovich Nalivkin wrote that Namangan is mentioned in legal documents dating back to 1643.

The city of Namangan dates back to the 17th century. A local salt miner's settlement (naman kann) appeared in the north of the Ferghana valley. The inhabitants of Aksikent (Ahsykenta) migrated here in the 17th century after the destructive earthquakes. Aksikent is the old city that was once the center of the valley of Fergana. Furthermore, the migration of people from other places of present-day Namangan region and partly from East Turkestan created the population of present-day Namangan. The city was the province's administrative centre in the middle of the 18th century (viloyat).

Politically, Namangan became a part of the Uyghur Empire of the Karakhanid State and was known to have been a settlement in the 15th century. The residents of the ancient city of Akhsikat, which was severely damaged by an earthquake, moved to the then-village of Namangan in 1610. Namangan became a city afterward. On the eve of the Russian invasion in 1867, the town had been a part of the Khanate of Kokand since the middle of the 18th century.

=== As part of the Russian Empire ===
Endless intrigues, coups and ensuing unrest led Namangan to join the uprising against Muhammad Khudayar Khan between 1873 and 1876.

Tsar Alexander II, supporting Khudayar Khan, sent troops to suppress the uprising. On September 26, 1875, General M.D. Skobelev crossed the Syr Darya and occupied the city.

However, a month later (in October) the rebels captured Namangan, and the Russian garrison, fortified in the citadel, with difficulty repulsed the rebel attacks.

Then Skobelev pulled up additional forces and subjected Namangan to an artillery bombardment, knocking the rebels out of the city and finally joining it to the Russian Empire.

After the territory of the Khanate of Kokand was incorporated into the empire, the city became the center of Namangan district of Fergana Oblast.

With the accession to Russia, industrial, commercial and banking capital began to penetrate Central Asia at a rapid pace. According to statistics, in 1892, 28 different enterprises were operating in Namangan district, employing 704 workers.

The cotton processing industry developed rapidly. The largest scale of production was characterized by 20 cotton ginning plants, which produced 81.5% of the total gross industrial output.

In connection with the development of the cotton processing industry, the demand for raw cotton increased enormously. In 1892 the gross cotton harvest in the county amounted to 22,600 tons from 21,500 hectares, the yield was 10.5 quintals.

Namangan was hit by a destructive earthquake in 1926 which killed 34 people, injured 72, and destroyed 4,850 houses.

Since Uzbekistan's independence in 1991, Namangan has gained a reputation for Islamic revivalism, with many mosques and schools funded by organizations from Middle Eastern countries, including the Wahhabi movement from Saudi Arabia that produced jihadist terrorists like Juma Namangani who fought and died in support of the Afghan Taliban and Al Qaeda. This has also translated into political opposition against the secular government of Uzbekistan. Some women have returned to wearing large white veils or even the black paranja.

== Geography ==
Namangan is located 450 metres (1,480 ft) above sea level. The Qoradaryo and Naryn Rivers join to form the Syr Darya just outside the southern edge of the city. The area of the city is 145 km^{2} (56 sq mi).

By road Namangan is 290 kilometres (180 mi) east of Tashkent, 68.5 kilometres (42.6 mi) west of Andijan, and 40.4 kilometres (25.1 mi) east of Chust.

=== Climate ===
Namangan has a cold semi-arid climate (Köppen climate classification: BSk) with cold winters and hot summers. The average July temperature is 26.3 °C (79.3 °F). The mean temperature in January is −2.3 °C (27.9 °F).

Climate data for Namangan (1991–2020)
Month	Jan	Feb	Mar	Apr	May	Jun	Jul	Aug	Sep	Oct	Nov	Dec	Year
Mean daily maximum °C (°F)	4.5 (40.1)	8.2 (46.8)	16.1 (61.0)	23.4 (74.1)	29.0 (84.2)	34.2 (93.6)	35.6 (96.1)	33.9 (93.0)	29.2 (84.6)	21.9 (71.4)	12.9 (55.2)	5.6 (42.1)	21.2 (70.2)
Daily mean °C (°F)	0.5 (32.9)	3.4 (38.1)	10.3 (50.5)	16.8 (62.2)	22.1 (71.8)	26.9 (80.4)	28.5 (83.3)	26.7 (80.1)	21.6 (70.9)	14.7 (58.5)	7.5 (45.5)	1.8 (35.2)	15.1 (59.1)
Mean daily minimum °C (°F)	−2.8 (27.0)	−0.4 (31.3)	5.6 (42.1)	11.2 (52.2)	15.7 (60.3)	19.9 (67.8)	21.7 (71.1)	20.2 (68.4)	15.3 (59.5)	9.2 (48.6)	3.2 (37.8)	−1.3 (29.7)	9.8 (49.7)
Average precipitation mm (inches)	16.9 (0.67)	27.6 (1.09)	27.4 (1.08)	24.0 (0.94)	24.4 (0.96)	12.0 (0.47)	4.3 (0.17)	3.1 (0.12)	3.8 (0.15)	14.4 (0.57)	23.9 (0.94)	25.3 (1.00)	207.1 (8.16)
Average precipitation days (≥ 1.0 mm)	8	10	10	10	10	8	5	4	4	6	7	10	92
Mean monthly sunshine hours	97.9	119.4	164.4	220.1	289.6	327.5	357.5	333.6	288.2	222.6	138.0	82.6	2,641.4
Source: NOAA

== Main sites ==
=== Babur Park ===
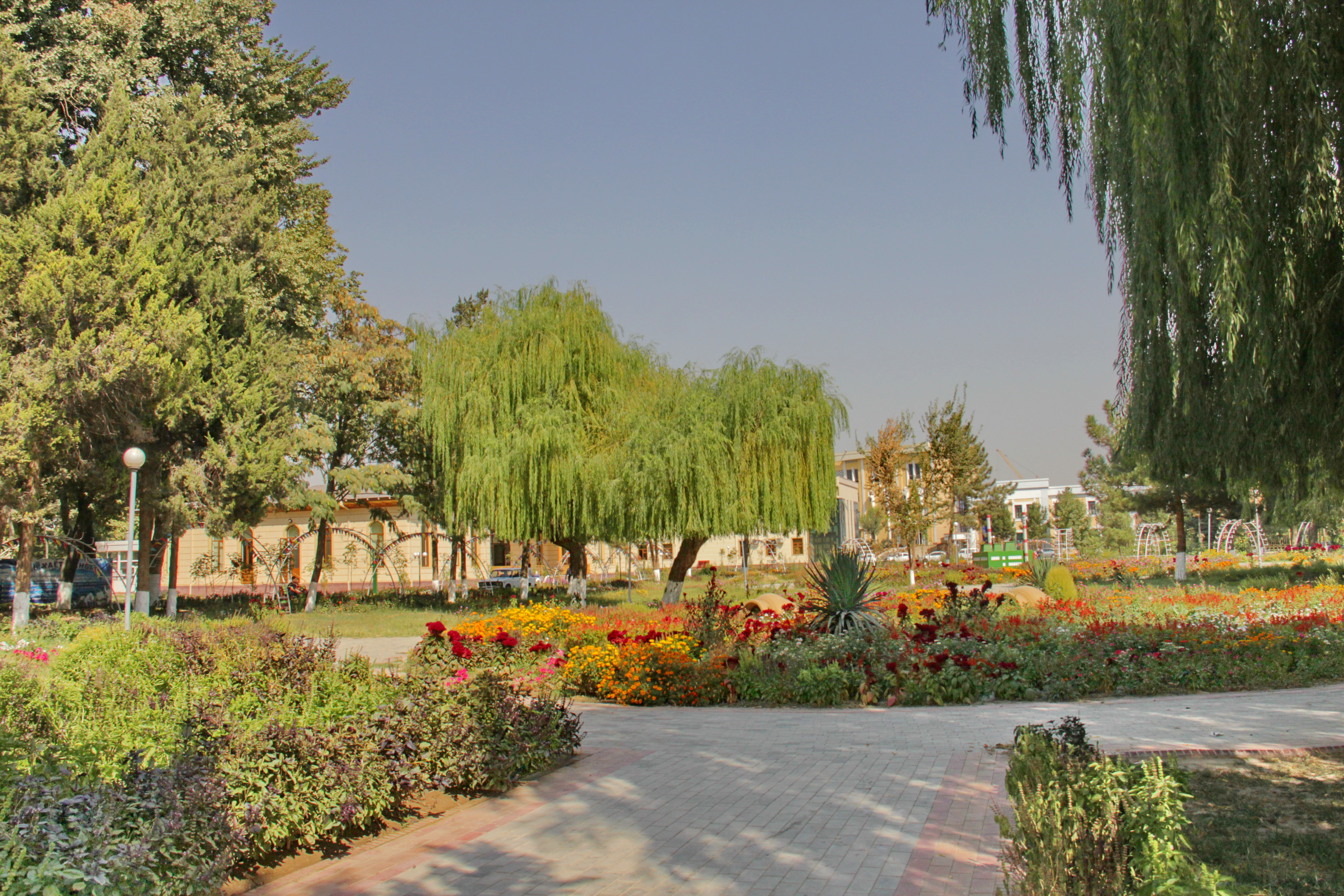
Babur Park

Located in the centre of the city, Babur Park was created in the late 19th century as the private garden of Namangan's Russian governor, but it is now open to the public. The park is named after Emperor Babur, who was born in the Fergana Valley, and it is known for its many old chinor trees.

=== Mullah Kyrgyz Madrasa ===
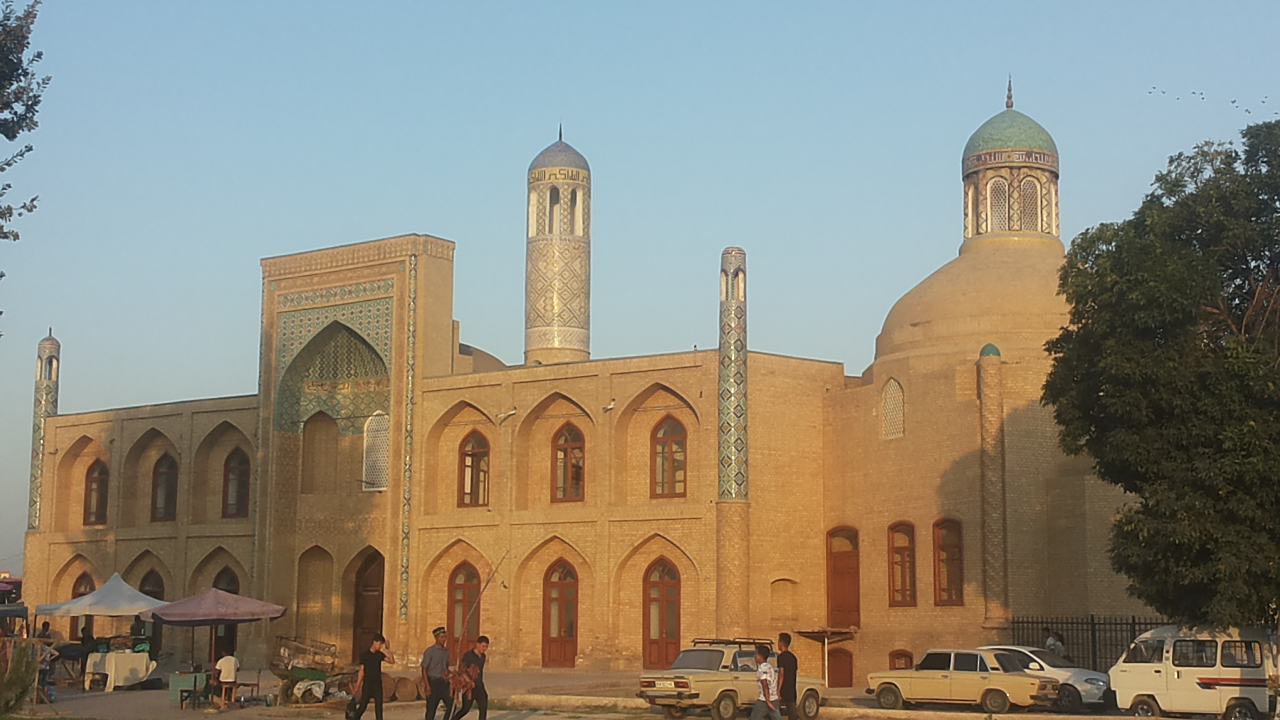
Mullah Kyrgyz Madrasa

The Mullah Kyrgyz Madrassa, built 1910, is named after a local architect, Usto Kyrgyz. Founded by a wealthy cotton magnate from Namangan, it was closed by the Soviets and spent much of the 20th century as a literary museum. The madrassa was restored by local residents following independence and it is listed as an historic monument.

The madrassa's minarets and portal have been completely restored, and the white, blue, yellow, and green mosaic tiles are particularly beautiful. There is carved woodwork on both the ceilings and the columns, including some finely carved calligraphy. Inside is a small courtyard surrounded by 35 rooms, which would have housed nearly 150 students.

=== Khodjamni Kabri Mausoleum and Khodja Amin Mosque ===
The Khodjamni Kabri Mausoleum and neighbouring Khodja Amin Mosque both date from the 1720s and are the work of local architect Usto Muhammad Ibrahim. They have both recently been renovated. Opened on all four sides, the portal-domed mosque hosts intricate terracotta tilework which was produced using a method which was commonplace in the 12th century but had disappeared in the Fergana Valley. The buildings are open for prayer, but only men may enter.

=== Ota Valikhon Tur Mosque ===
Built in 1915, the Ota Valikhon Tur Mosque is located 1 km east of Namangan's bazaar. Arabic calligraphy adorns the brickwork on the exterior, with gorgeous star-shaped carvings. The large domes are decorated with blue mosaic stripes. This mosque was linked with the controversial Wahhabi sect during the 1990s and received funding from Saudi Arabia before it was closed by the Uzbek government. It is now a gallery of the Namangan Artists’ Union, displaying the work of local artists.

== Demographics ==
With a population of 644,800 (2021), Namangan is Uzbekistan's second-largest city by population. Between 2016 and 2017, the population rose by almost 100,000, partly due to a change of boundaries between the city and the neighbouring districts. Uzbeks are the largest ethnic group.

Historical population
Year	Pop.	±% p.a.
1897	62,000	—
1926	74,000	+0.61%
1939	77,000	+0.31%
1959	123,000	+2.37%
1973	194,000	+3.31%
1986	283,000	+2.95%
2003	395,800	+1.99%
2011	453,500	+1.72%
2014	475,700	+1.61%
2016	493,300	+1.83%
2017	590,200	+19.64%
2018	600,200	+1.69%
2021	644,800	+2.42%

== Economy ==
Namangan has been an important craft and trade center in the Fergana Valley since the 17th century. After annexation by the Russians in 1867, cotton production and food processing became the dominant economic activity, as it did in many other places in the country. Many factories were built in the city during Soviet times. During World War II, industrial production in Namangan increased fivefold compared with that of 1926–1927. After the war both light and heavy industries increased significantly.

Currently Namangan is mainly a center for light industry, especially in food. There are 36 joint companies and over 400 small and medium enterprises in the city.

== Education ==
Library in Namangan

Currently there are 6 public and 5 private higher education institutions in Namangan city — the public ones are: Namangan State University, Namangan Institute of Engineering and Construction, Namangan Institute of Engineering and Technology, Namangan State Pedagogical Institute, Namangan State Institute of Foreign Languages, Namangan Institute of textile industry and private ones are: Turan International University, Namangan branch of The Kimyo International University in Tashkent, Impuls Medical Institute, University of Business and Science, Namangan International University.

== Transportation ==
Namangan is served by Namangan Airport which is located 12 km from the city center. The city has its own railway station which was built in 1912. It currently only allows for passengers two days a week. Taxi and bus services are run by private organisations but all use a similar route and payment model.

== Notable people ==
- Mashrab (1640–1711) — an influential Sufi poet. Boborahim Mashrab was born in 1657. He went to Qashqar and increased his knowledge under supervision of Ofoq Hoja. From 1673 up to the end of his life he lived as a travelling mystic. In 1711 he was murdered by hokim of Balh Mahmud Taragay. In M. Namangoniy's “ Tazkiratul-avliyo”, I. Bogistoniy's “Tazkirai-qalandaron”, M. Samarqandiy's “Muzakkiri – ashob”, Hakimhon's “Muhtabat – tavorih”, M. Olim's “Ansobus-Salotin” we may find some information about his life and works. The Russian scientists N.I. Veselovskiy, N.S. Likoshin, V.L. Vyatkin expressed important ideas about Mashrab's creative works in 19th and 20th centuries. Also some specialists in Uzbek literature such as I. Sulton, V. Zohidov, I. Muminov, G. Gulom, A.Hayitmetov, A. Abdugafurov, E. Shodiyev, V. Abdullayev expressed their own opinion about Mashrab's life and creative activity. More detailed information we find in “Qissai Mashrab” by Pirmat Setoriy. This work has many manuscripts and copies.
- Sobir Rahmonov (1910–1990) — a famous theater actor, People's Artist of Uzbekistan (1961)
- Usmon Nosir (1912–1944)- The talented poet Usmon Nosir who entered the Uzbek literature of the 20th century as a thunder and lived a very short creative life as a lightning. He was born on November 13, 1912, in Namangan. Writing books from his childhood his creative work extended only 15 years, until the time he was put in prison. In that period he showed his rare talent. Young poet's books as “Quyosh bilan suhbat” (conversation with the sun) (1932), “Safarbar satrlar” (mobilized lines) (1932), “Yurak” (heart) (1935), “Mehrim” (my loving) (1935) were published at that time. In 1937, on July 14, with the slander "the enemy of the people" he was put in prison first in Tashkent, Magadan and in Kemerovo. Being exhausted in the prison he died in 1944, in Kemerovo.
- Yoqub Ahmedov (born 1938) — a notable theater and film actor, People's Artist of the USSR (1991)
- Obidkhon Sobitkhony (born 1958), Uzbek imam regime critic
- Shirin Abdullaeva (2005–2025), notable singer, model and actress

== Sister cities ==
- Seongnam, South Korea (September 22, 2009)
- Shanghai, China (June 2, 2011)
- Prague, Czech Republic (March 17, 2012)
