= Namangan Region =

Region of Uzbekistan

Namangan Region Namangan viloyati
- Region
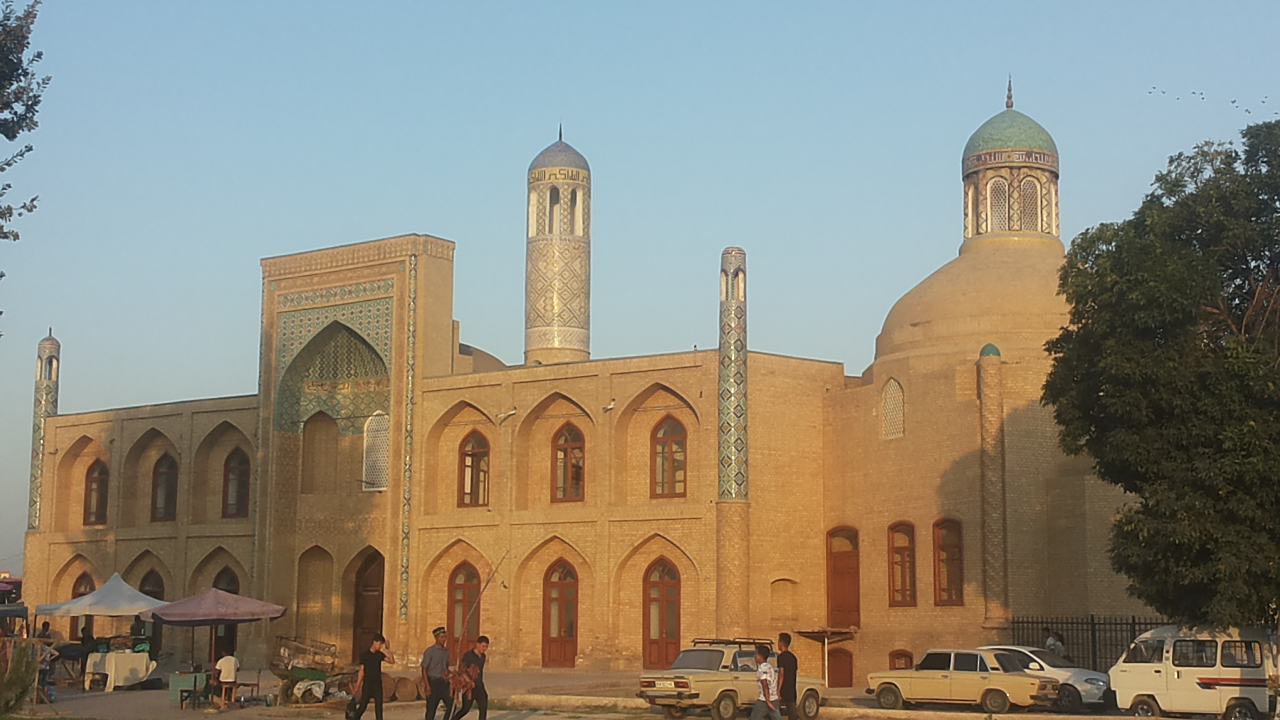
- Mullah Kyrgyz Madrasa, Namangan

- Namangan in Uzbekistan
- Coordinates: 41°0′N 71°10′E
- Country: Uzbekistan
- Settled: 1941
- Capital: Namangan

Government
  - Hokim: Shavkatjon Abdurazakov

Area
  - Total: 7,440 km^{2} (2,870 sq mi)
- Elevation: 641 m (2,103 ft)

Population (2021)
  - Total: 2,867,400
  - Density: 385/km^{2} (998/sq mi)
- Time zone: UTC+5 (UZT)
- ISO 3166 code: UZ-NG
- Districts: 11
- Cities: 8
- Townships: 11
- Villages: 99
- Website: www.namangan.uz

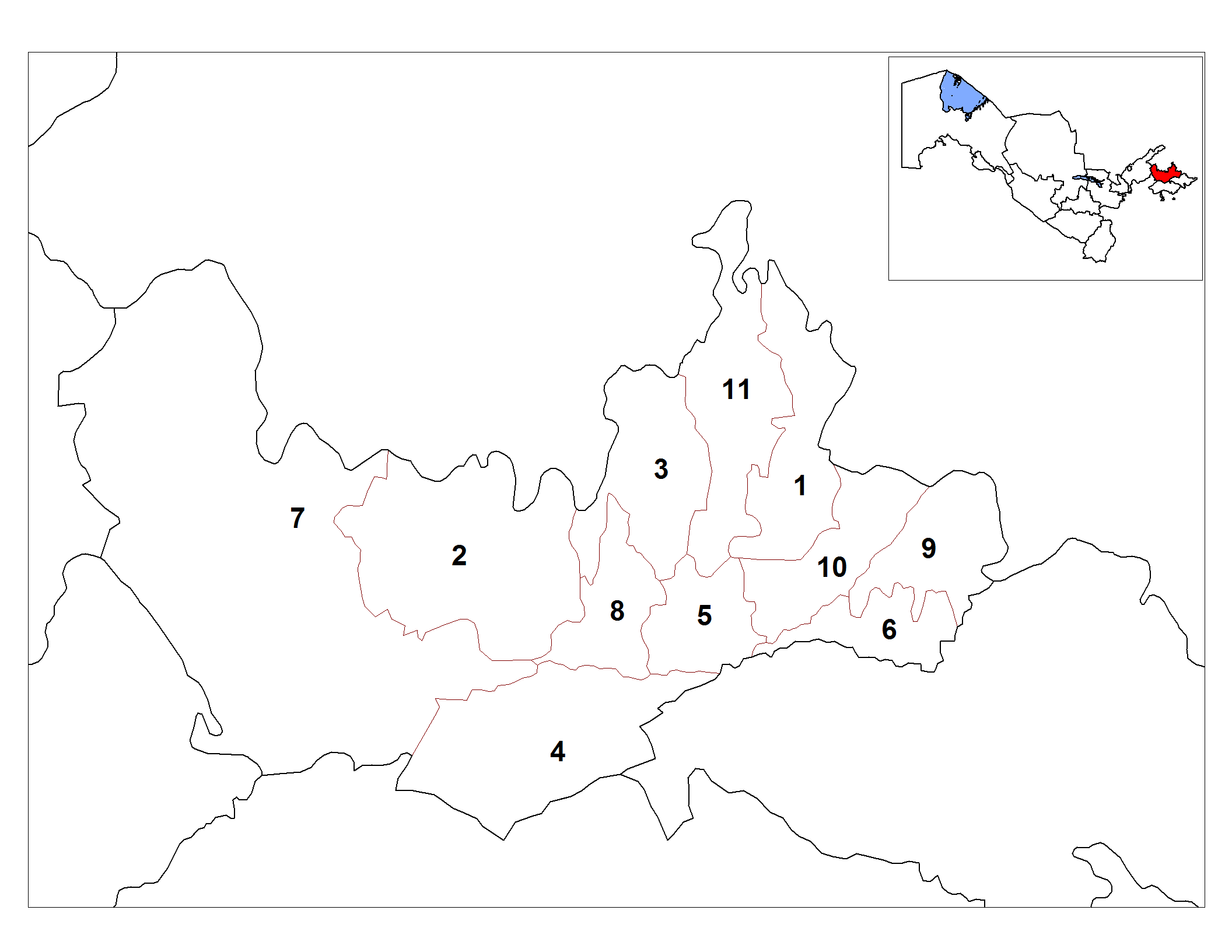
Districts of Namangan Region

Namangan Region (Uzbek: Namangan viloyati/Наманган вилояти, نمنگن ولايتى; Russian: Наманганская область, Namanganskaya oblast) is one of the regions of Uzbekistan, located in the southern part of the Fergana Valley in far eastern part of the country. It is on the right bank of Syr Darya River and borders with Kyrgyzstan, Tajikistan, Tashkent Region, Fergana Region, and Andijan Region. It covers an area of 7,440 km^{2}. The population is estimated to be 2,931,056 (2022), with 35% of the population living in rural areas. The great river Syrdarya, the main waterway in Central Asia, starts in the territory of Namangan. Syrdarya is formed from inflows of the rivers Naryn and Kara Darya. The Namangan region is very rich in various natural resources. In particular, the region extracts oil in Mingbulak District and big gold and diamond deposits have been discovered in Kosonsoy and Pop Districts. There are also large deposits of uranium, silver, aluminum, tungsten, iron, copper, granite, and marble, among others. There are two big mountain tunnels connecting the Fergana valley with the inner city area and other regions of the country, located in the territory of Namangan.

== Districts ==
The Namangan Region consists of 11 districts (listed below) and one district-level city: Namangan.

Key	District name	District capital
1	Chortoq District	Chortoq
2	Chust District	Chust
3	Kosonsoy District	Kosonsoy
4	Mingbuloq District	Joʻmashoʻy
5	Namangan District	Toshbuloq
6	Norin District	Haqqulobod
7	Pop District	Pop
8	Toʻraqoʻrgʻon District	Toʻraqoʻrgʻon
9	Uchqoʻrgʻon District	Uchqoʻrgʻon
10	Uychi District	Uychi
11	Yangiqoʻrgʻon District	Yangiqoʻrgʻon
12	Yangi Namangan District	Doʻstlik

There are 8 cities (Namangan, Kosonsoy, Haqqulobod, Pop, Toʻraqoʻrgʻon, Yangi Namangan, Uchqoʻrgʻon, Chortoq, Chust) and 115 urban-type settlements in the Namangan Region.

== Geography ==
The climate is a typically continental climate with extreme differences between winter and summer temperatures.

Natural resources include deposits of petroleum, natural gas, gold, lead, copper, quartz and antimony. Main agriculture includes cotton, horticulture and sericulture, animal husbandry, including breeding of Angora goats for their valuable down hair.

Industry is primarily based on textiles, with two large silk production complexes, a non-woven fabric manufacturing plant, cotton yarn processing, and numerous smaller textile, leather and footwear plants. The area is also a center for the production of traditional Uzbek handicrafts, especially knives.

== Economy ==
By the first half of 2014, gross regional product of Namangan region has comprised 2,214 billion soum, which is a 9.8% increase comparing to the same period in 2013. In fact, industry has grown 13%, agriculture – 7.6%, construction – 5.7%, trade – 13.6%, services – 16%.

The major spheres of agricultural are cotton, cereals, fruits and vegetables, as well as livestock production. Textile, food processing, machinery, and building materials production are prevailing in the regional industry.

There are engineering plants, automotive repair shops, chemical plants, as well as cotton yarn, silk, and leather productions, developed handicrafts, and several companies with foreign capital in Namangan region. There are such foreign capital (Korean, Russian, Chinese, American, Vietnamese, Pakistani, Turkish etc.) companies as Uzbek-Swiss joint venture (JV) «Nestle-Uzbekistan» producing baby food, Uzbek-Korean JV «Uzchasis» producing car headlights and street lights, Korean enterprise «Hayn Tex» producing textile, Uzbek-American JV «Mushtariy International LTD» producing clothing and others.

As of July 2014, foreign trade turnover of Namangan region comprised US$136 million, which is a 10.8% increase comparing to the same period in previous year. Export has grown 13.6%, and import – 3.4%. Export is dominated by cotton (42.8%), consumer goods (18.9%), services (5.2%) and others, where as import is represented by equipment and machinery (35.5%), consumer goods (17.1%), chemical production (23%) and other.

== Education ==
There are 690 schools, 10 academic lyceums, 108 colleges in Namangan region. Moreover, there are 6 public and 5 private higher education institutions in Namangan city — the public ones are: Namangan State University, Namangan Institute of Engineering and Construction, Namangan Institute of Engineering and Technology, Namangan State Pedagogical Institute, Namangan State Institute of Foreign Languages, Namangan Institute of textile industry and private ones are: Turan International University, Namangan branch of The Kimyo International University in Tashkent, Impuls Medical Institute, University of Business and Science, Namangan International University.

== History and sightseeing ==
Namangan region plays an important role in the centuries-old history of Uzbekistan, especially at the time of Independence.

There are historical and holy places in the region: Mulla Kirgiz mosque (1910), Ota Valikhon Tura and Sheykh Iskhok Eshon mosques, Hasrati Mavlono Lutfullokh Chustiy complex, Mulla Bozor Okhund mausoleum, as well as such holy places as Baliqlik Mozor, Buloqdi Mozor, and Bibi Ona. These objects are protected by the government. The Namangan region is widely known for its gardens and it is also famous for a national dress made of "Beqasam" material, a type of silk called atlas and Chust knives, embroidered skull-caps, as well as the curative waters of its sanatoria and resorts, the most popular resort being in the city of Chartak. The Mausoleum of Devona Buva is an architectural monument located in the Namangan Region. The mausoleum was built in the 18th century. Devona Buva Mausoleum was built between 1725 and 1750.
