= Kamchik Pass =

Mountain pass in Uzbekistan

- Uzbek: Qamchiq dovoni
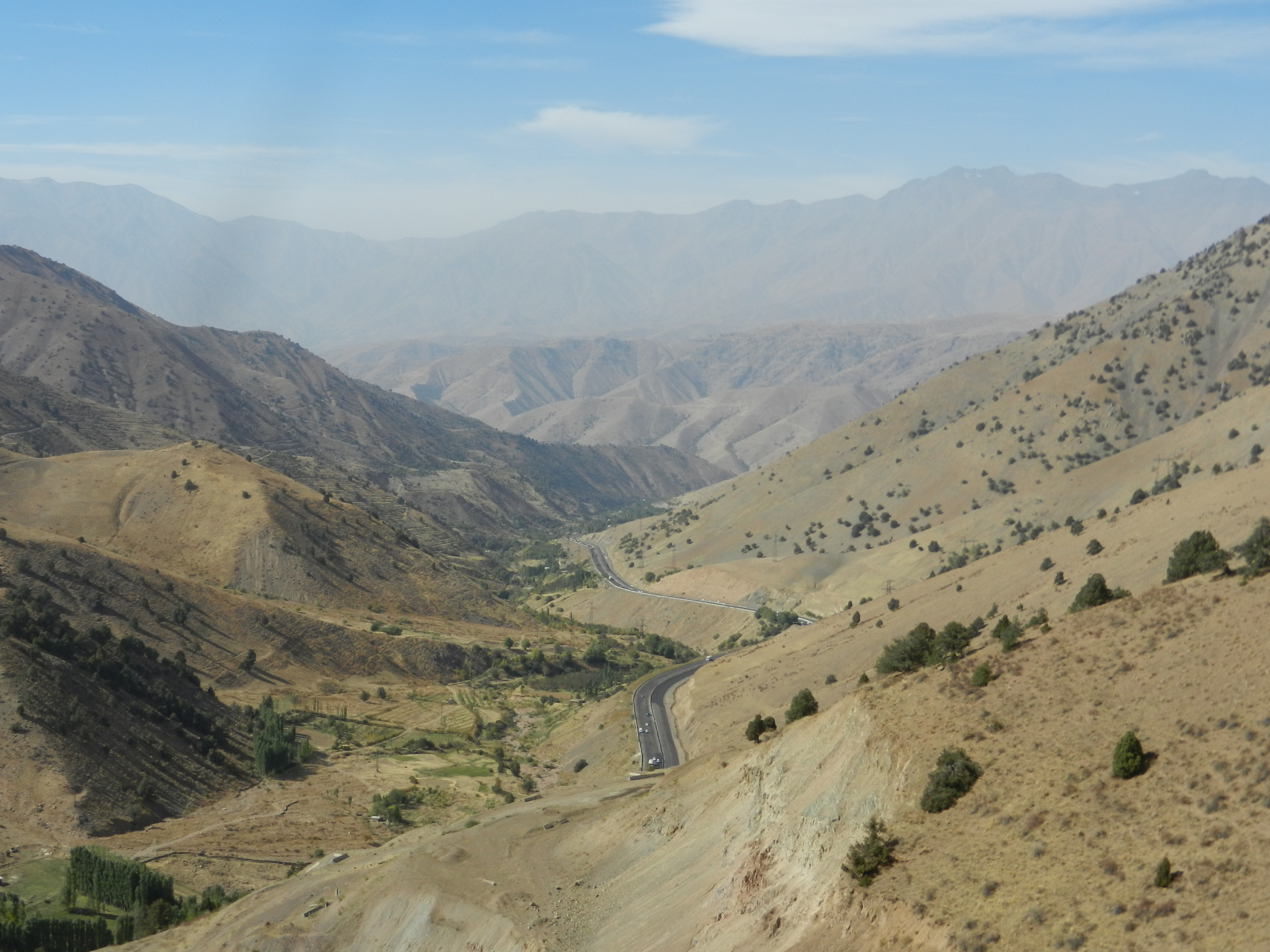
- View from Kamchik Pass towards west

- Location within Uzbekistan
- Elevation: 2,268 metres (7,441 ft)

Third Approach
- Location: Uzbekistan
- Range: Qurama Mountains
- Coordinates: 41°06′0″N 70°31′5″E

The Kamchik Pass (Uzbek: Qamchiq dovoni), also spelt Kamchiq or Qamchiq, is a mountain pass in the Qurama Mountains in eastern Uzbekistan. The pass provides a strategically important route as an access for ground transport traveling between the Tashkent and Namangan Regions in the Fergana Valley bypassing neighboring Tajikistan. It connects the capital city of Tashkent with Osh, the second-largest city in neighboring Kyrgyzstan. The peak of the pass reaches 2,268 metres (7,441 ft) above sea level.

== Route ==
For centuries, the Kamchik Pass was part of Central Asia's Silk Road trade route that connected the markets of Asia and Europe. The Tashkent-Osh (A373) international highway now winds through the pass. Approximately 10,000 to 15,000 vehicles travel through the Kamchik Pass each day.

== Weather ==
The Kamchik Pass is frequently closed in the winter due to avalanche hazards. Mudslides and landslides are also threats to vehicles along the route and the nearby villages. In February 2015, the United Nations Development Programme announced it would help aid a disaster risk-reduction project for the Kamchik Pass. The plan is to improve an early warning monitoring system, emergency assistance and education for the people living in remote and rural disaster-prone regions nearby. The project is funded by the European Commission's Humanitarian Aid and Civil Protection Department (ECHO).

Climate data for Kamchik Pass (elevation 2,138 meters (7,014 ft)), 1991–2020
| Month | Jan | Feb | Mar | Apr | May | Jun | Jul | Aug | Sep | Oct | Nov | Dec | Year |
|---|---|---|---|---|---|---|---|---|---|---|---|---|---|
| Mean daily maximum °C (°F) | −1.1 (30.0) | 0.0 (32.0) | 4.4 (39.9) | 10.1 (50.2) | 14.9 (58.8) | 19.6 (67.3) | 22.8 (73.0) | 22.5 (72.5) | 18.1 (64.6) | 11.2 (52.2) | 5.1 (41.2) | 0.8 (33.4) | 10.7 (51.3) |
| Daily mean °C (°F) | −5.4 (22.3) | −4.5 (23.9) | 0.0 (32.0) | 5.7 (42.3) | 10.5 (50.9) | 15.0 (59.0) | 17.8 (64.0) | 17.3 (63.1) | 12.9 (55.2) | 6.5 (43.7) | 0.9 (33.6) | −3.4 (25.9) | 6.1 (43.0) |
| Mean daily minimum °C (°F) | −8.4 (16.9) | −7.8 (18.0) | −3.2 (26.2) | 2.4 (36.3) | 6.8 (44.2) | 10.9 (51.6) | 13.6 (56.5) | 13.2 (55.8) | 9.0 (48.2) | 3.0 (37.4) | −2.2 (28.0) | −6.4 (20.5) | 2.6 (36.7) |
| Average precipitation mm (inches) | 69.7 (2.74) | 82.9 (3.26) | 80.1 (3.15) | 93.4 (3.68) | 76.4 (3.01) | 46.0 (1.81) | 21.9 (0.86) | 14.1 (0.56) | 16.7 (0.66) | 52.4 (2.06) | 78.4 (3.09) | 80.6 (3.17) | 712.6 (28.06) |
| Average precipitation days (≥ 1.0 mm) | 16 | 16 | 17 | 15 | 15 | 12 | 7 | 5 | 4 | 9 | 12 | 15 | 143 |
Source: NOAA

== Railway pass ==
In March 2013, Uzbek Railways announced plans to build a new railway through the Kamchik Pass to allow freight traffic to bypass neighboring Tajikistan. The 129 kilometres (80 mi) long electric rail line connects existing railways at Angren and Pop in order to create a direct route between the cities of Tashkent and Namangan. The new rail allows Uzbekistan to abandon the Soviet-era line that cuts across Tajikistan's Sughd Region, saving Uzbekistan a reported $25 million in transit fees it pays to Tajikistan each year. The line opened in 2016.

== See also ==
- Kamchiq Tunnel
