= Angren–Pop railway line =

Railway line in Uzbekistan

Angren-Pop railway line

Overview
- Native name: Angren-Pop temir yoʻli
- Status: in operation
- Owner: Uzbek Railways
- Locale: Uzbekistan
- Termini: Angren, Uzbekistan; Pop, Uzbekistan
- Stations: 4

Service
- Services: 1
- Operator: Uzbek Railways

History
- Opened: 22 June 2016

Technical
- Line length: 123 km (76 mi)
- Track gauge: 1,520 mm (4 ft 11 27/32 in) broad gauge

The Angren–Pop railway line (Uzbek: Angren-Pop temir yoʻli) is an electrified railway line in eastern Uzbekistan. It provides an additional transport line besides the Kamchik road pass, improving the connection between the Fergana Valley with the rest of Uzbekistan. The total cost of the project was $1.9 billion. The line opened on 22 June 2016. Passenger trains began operating on 1 September 2016.

The 123 kilometres (76 mi) long electric rail line connects the existing railways at Angren and Pop to create a direct route between the cities of Tashkent and Namangan. The new rail allows Uzbekistan to abandon the Soviet-era line that cuts across Tajikistan's Sughd Region, saving Uzbekistan a reported $25 million in transit fees it pays to Tajikistan each year. The project cost an estimated US$1.9 billion and was built over five years. Construction began in March 2013. In September 2013, the China Railway Tunnel Group signed a construction contract worth $455 million.

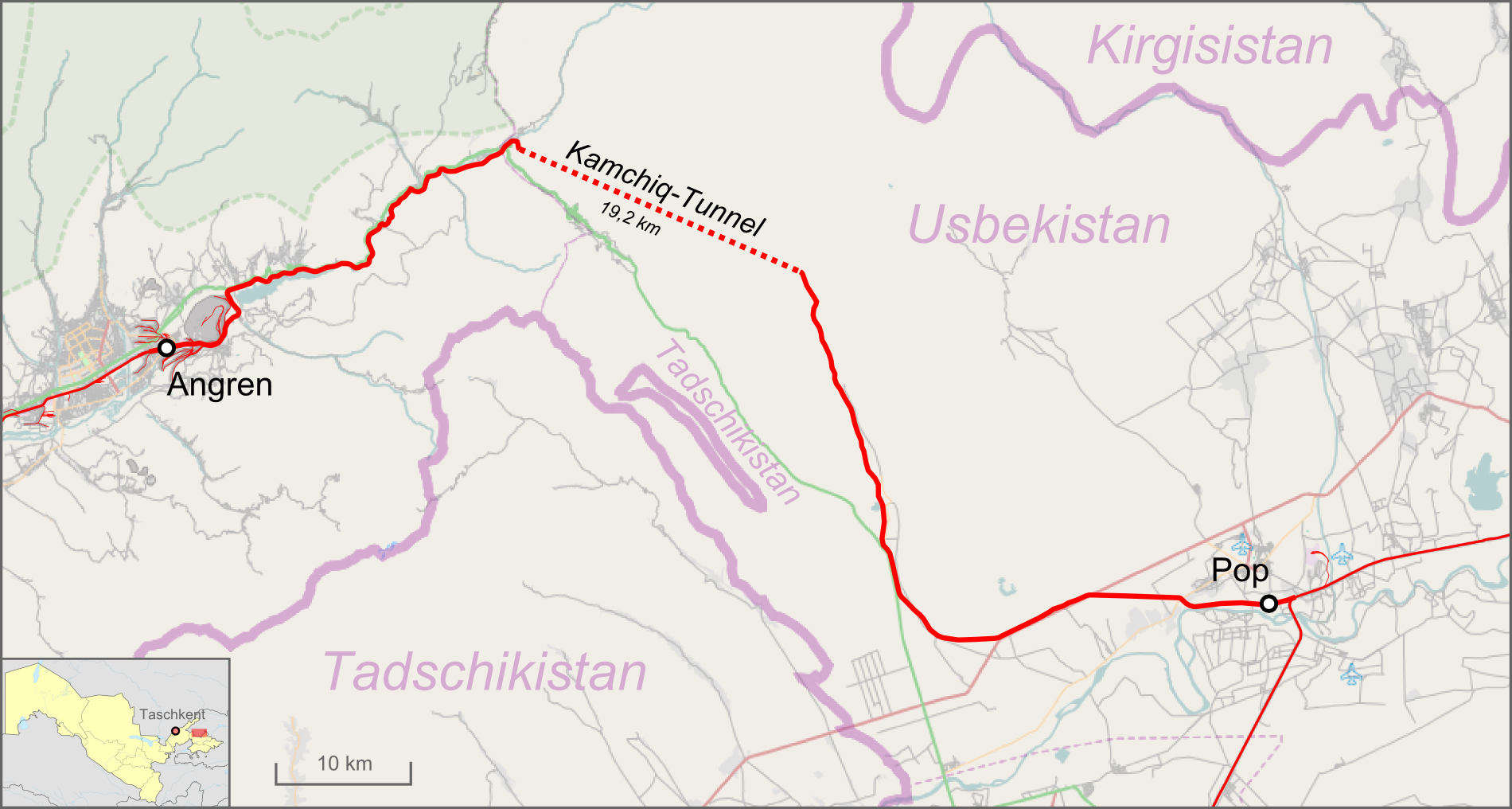
Qamchiq Tunnel

The project was funded by the Uzbekistan government and international loans. In May 2014, the Export-Import Bank of China announced it would lend Uzbekistan US$350 million to fund the Chinese tunnel contract. In February 2015, the World Bank confirmed it would lend Uzbekistan US$195 million for the Angren–Pap Railway.

The line includes the Qamchiq Tunnel, the longest tunnel in Central Asia, and 2.1 kilometres (1.3 mi) of bridges. Uzbek Railways is responsible for the construction and China Railway Tunnel Group constructed the Qamchiq Tunnel.
