= Qurama Mountains =

Mountain range in Uzbekistan and Tajikistan

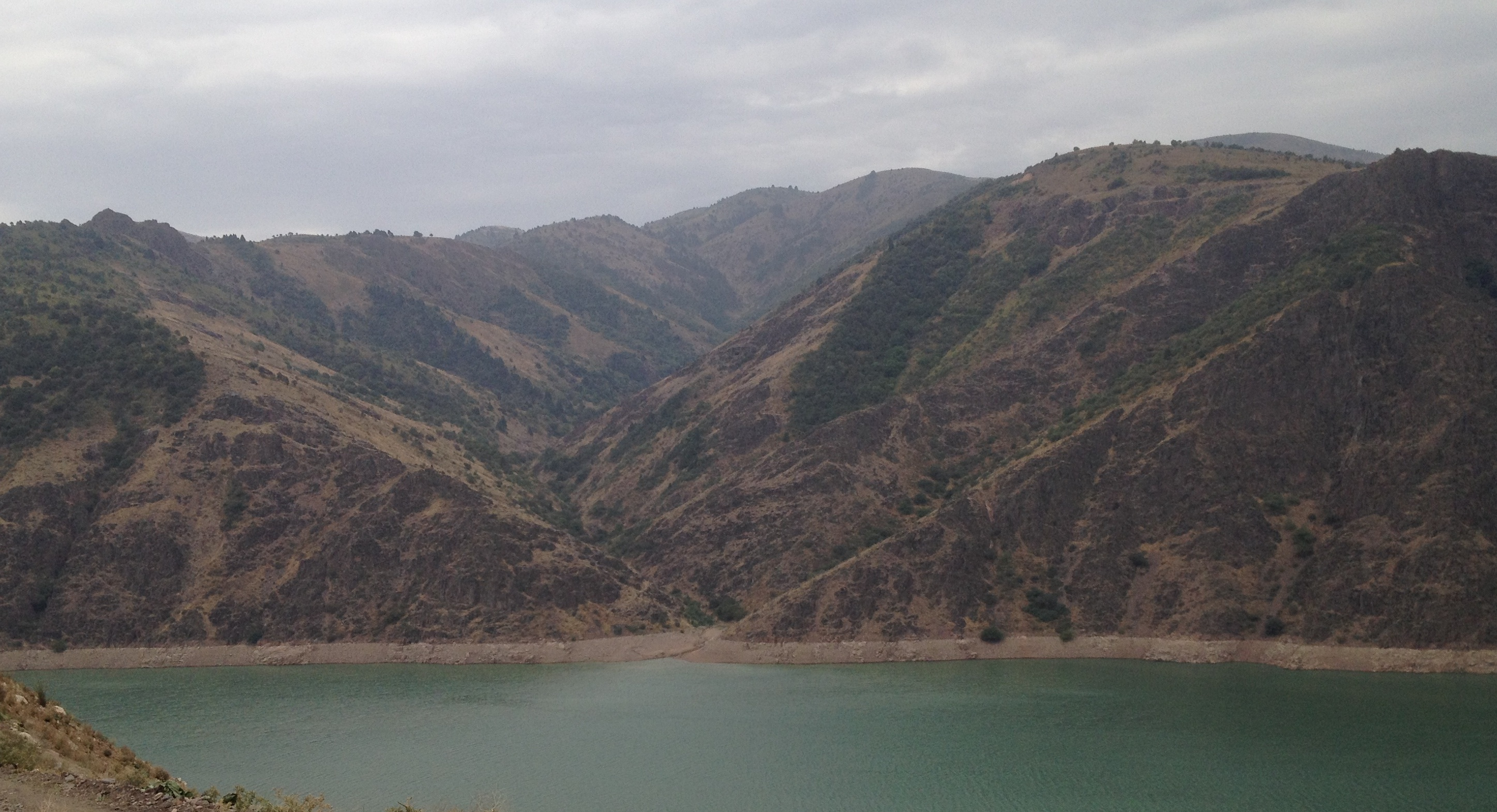
- Qurama mountains near Aсhangaran reservoir (Angren River)

Highest point
- Elevation: 3,769 m (12,365 ft)
- Coordinates: 40°51′N 70°21′E

Dimensions
- Length: 170 km (110 mi) NW-SE

Naming
- Native name: Qurama tizmasi (Uzbek)

Geography
- Location within Asia
- Countries: Uzbekistan; Tajikistan; Kyrgyzstan

The Qurama Mountains (Russian: Кураминский хребет; Uzbek: Qurama tizmasi/Қурама тизмаси) is a mountain range in Tajikistan and Uzbekistan and continues into Kyrgyzstan. The range is a water divide between Angren River to the north and the Syr Darya to the south. The highest point is the Boboiob at 3,769 metres (12,365 ft).

== See also ==
- Kamchik Pass
