= Xalqobod =

Xalqobod or Khalkabad may refer to:

Places (Towns in Uzbekistan)

- Xalqobod, Surxondaryo Region
- Xalqobod, Namangan Region
- Xalqobod, Karakalpakstan
