= Kamchiq Tunnel =

Railway tunnel in Uzbekistan

Coordinates: 41.1097°N 70.5853°E

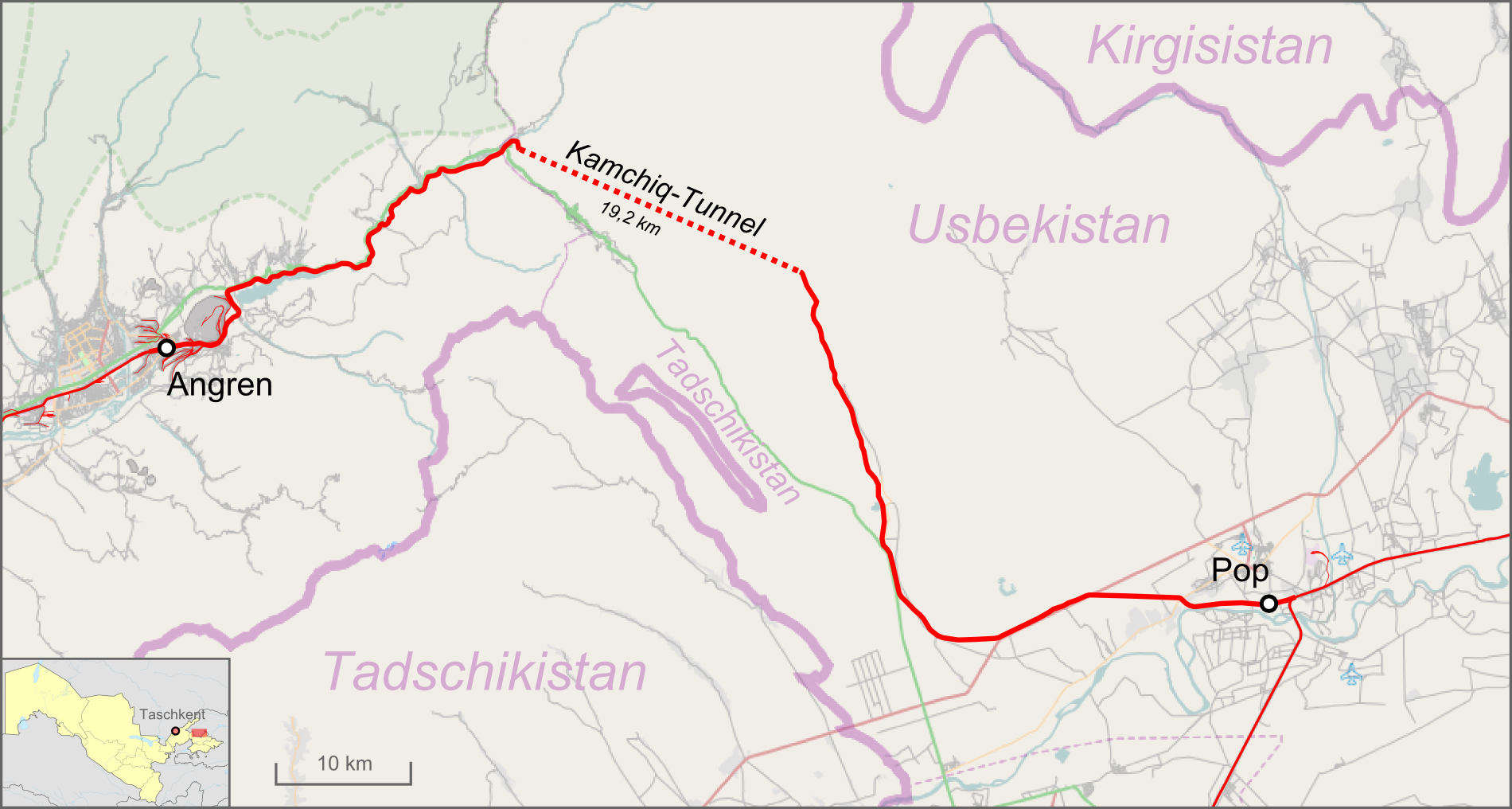

- Location within Uzbekistan

Overview
- Other name: Qamchiq Tunnel
- Line: Angren–Pop railway line

Operation
- Opened: 22 June 2016
- Operator: Uzbek Railways

Technical
- Track length: 19.2 kilometres (11.9 mi)
- Track gauge: 1,520 mm (4 ft 11 27/32 in) Russian gauge
- Electrified: electrified

The Kamchiq Tunnel (Uzbek: Qamchiq tonneli) is a 19.2 kilometres (11.9 mi) long railway tunnel in Uzbekistan, which makes it the longest tunnel in Central Asia and in ex-USSR, and the longest broad gauge railway tunnel in the world (not counting metros).

== Background ==
This tunnel connects the fertile and densely populated Fergana Valley region of Uzbekistan, where about one third of the population lives, to the rest of the country. Prior to the fall of the Soviet Union and the independence of the republics of Central Asia, connectivity to Fergana Valley region was not an issue, as a rail line cutting across Sughd Region of Tajik SSR connected Tashkent and the rest of Uzbekistan to the region. The breakup of the Soviet Union meant that Fergana Valley was connected to the rest of Uzbekistan via only one road connection, A373 Highway through Kamchik Pass. Rail connection required travelling through territory of the now separate country of Tajikistan, resulting in a reported annual cost of $25 million in transit fees paid to Tajikistan.

== Construction ==
The tunnel was built by the China Railway Tunnel Group in collaboration with the Uzbek Railways and leads through seven geologic faults. Construction began September 2013 and the excavation works were finished 27 February 2016. In January 2014, work was delayed by an avalanche, covering the entrance with 78 metres (256 ft) of snow.

The tunnel is part of the Angren–Pop railway line.

The tunnel was opened for traffic on June 22, 2016.

== See also ==
- Kamchik Pass
