= Oltinkon =

- urban-type settlement
- Location in Uzbekistan
- Coordinates: 41°00′15″N 70°44′06″E
- Country: Uzbekistan
- Region: Namangan Region
- District: Pop District
- Urban-type settlement status: 1966

Population (1989)
  - Total: 2,066
- Time zone: UTC+5 (UZT)

Oltinkon (Uzbek: Oltinkon/Олтинкон, Russian: Алтынкан) is an urban-type settlement in Namangan Region, Uzbekistan. It is part of Pop District. The town population in 1989 was 2066 people.
