= Osman Pashayev =

Crimean Tatar journalist and producer

Osman Server oglu Pashayev (Crimean Tatar: Osman Server oğlu Paşayev, Ukrainian: Осман Серверович Пашаєв, Russian: Осман Серверович Пашаев; born 23 January 1977 in Angren) is Crimean Tatar journalist and producer.

== Biography ==
Pashayev was born in Uzbekistan in Crimean Tatar family. His grandparents were deported from Crimea by the NKVD along with the entire Crimean Tatar nation in 1944. Since 1980 he lived in the Ukrainian city of Henichesk and since 1989 moved to Crimea.

Pashayev studied in Kyiv National Economic University. First he worked as a news presenter on Crimean Tatar edition of state "Krym" TV-company, and later as a reporter there. In 2001 he moved to Kyiv. He worked with various TV-channels including STB, Inter, 5 Kanal, NTN, TVi. From 2011 to 2014 he worked on Crimean Tatar TV-channel ATR in Simferopol. In spring 2013 he moved to Istanbul office of ATR.

In 2009 he was elected on chairman of "Mediafront" trade union which brings together 158 workers of four national Ukrainian channels (STB, 1+1, Ukrayina, TONIS). During the annexation of Crimea by the Russian Federation he founded Crimean Open Channel with purpose of covering events in occupied Crimea by live streams from hot spots and streets, blitz-interviews with random citizens and studio interviews with politicians and activists. In the beginning the project was joined by Zenife Seydametova, Muslim Umerov, Ridvan Pashayev and Lyuman Abdullayev.

Pashayev did reports on the Gezi protests, Ukrainian revolution and Russian annexation of Crimea as well as investigations concerning Ukrainian officials including Viktor Yanukovych, Viktor Yushchenko and Valentyna Semeniuk.

Crimean Tatar newspaper Avdet recognized him as one of the 20 most influential Crimean Tatars as of 2009.
