= Chorkesar =

- urban-type settlement
- Location in Uzbekistan
- Coordinates: 41°01′50″N 70°54′33″E
- Country: Uzbekistan
- Region: Namangan Region
- District: Pop District
- Urban-type settlement status: 1957

Population (1989)
  - Total: 1,382
- Time zone: UTC+5 (UZT)

Chorkesar (Uzbek: Chorkesar/Чоркесар, Russian: Чаркесар, romanized: Charkesar) is an urban-type settlement in Namangan Region, Uzbekistan. It is part of Pop District. The town population in 1989 was 1382 people.

In 2021 preparations for the environmental remediation a nearby former uranium mine, and also at Yangiabad, started with the assistance of a €2 million grant from the European Bank for Reconstruction and Development.
