= Nurobod, Tashkent Region =

Nurobod
- urban-type settlement
- Location in Uzbekistan
- Coordinates: 40°54′20″N 69°48′12″E
- Country: Uzbekistan
- Region: Tashkent Region
- City: Angren
- Urban-type settlement: 1984

Population (2003)
  - Total: 6,500
- Time zone: UTC+5 (UZT)
- Postal code: 110313

Nurobod (Uzbek: Нуробод, Nurobod, Russian: Нурабад, romanized: Nurabad) is an urban-type settlement in Tashkent Region, Uzbekistan. It is part of the city of Angren. The town's population in 2003 was 6500 people.
