= Uygʻursoy =

- urban-type settlement
- Location in Uzbekistan
- Coordinates: 40°55′35″N 71°03′02″E
- Country: Uzbekistan
- Region: Namangan Region
- District: Pop District
- Urban-type settlement: 1947

Population (1989)
  - Total: 2,512
- Time zone: UTC+5 (UZT)

Uygʻursoy (Uzbek: Uygʻursoy/Уйғурсой, Russian: Уйгурсай, romanized: Uygursay) is an urban-type settlement in Namangan Region, Uzbekistan. It is part of Pop District. The town population in 1989 was 2,512 people.
