= Mount Boboiob =

Mountain in Tajikistan

Coordinates: 40°50′56″N 70°20′36″E

Mount Boboiob is a mountain in Tajikistan. It is located in the Sughd Region, in the northern part of the country, 290 km northeast of Dushanbe, the country's capital. The mountain is 3,747 meters above sea level.

The land around Mount Boboiob is mostly mountainous. It is the highest point in the area. There are about 38 people per square kilometer as part of Mount Boboiob's relatively small population. The nearest larger town is Oshoba, located 15.0 km to the southeast. The area around the mountain is almost completely covered with grass. In the region around Mount Boboiob, mountains are extremely common, as it is part of the Qurama Mountain Range.

The climate is dry. The average temperature is 13 °C. The warmest month is July, at 28 °C, and the coldest December, at -2 °C. The average rainfall is 318 millimeters per year. The wettest month is April, with 58 millimeters of rain, and the driest September, with 4 millimeters.
