= Krasnogorsk, Uzbekistan =

Krasnogorsk
- Location in Uzbekistan
- Coordinates: 41°09′15″N 69°40′11″E
- Country: Uzbekistan
- Region: Tashkent Region
- City: Angren
- Founded: 1953
- Elevation: 849 m (2,785 ft)

Population (2011)
  - Total: 19,176
- Time zone: UTC+5

Krasnogorsk is an urban-type settlement in Tashkent Region of Uzbekistan. It is part of the city of Angren. It was founded in Soviet times in 1953 as Krasnogorsky. 19,176 people live in the town as of 2011. During Soviet time, a large proportion of the town population were German-speakers deported there from throughout the Soviet Union.
