= Yangiobod =

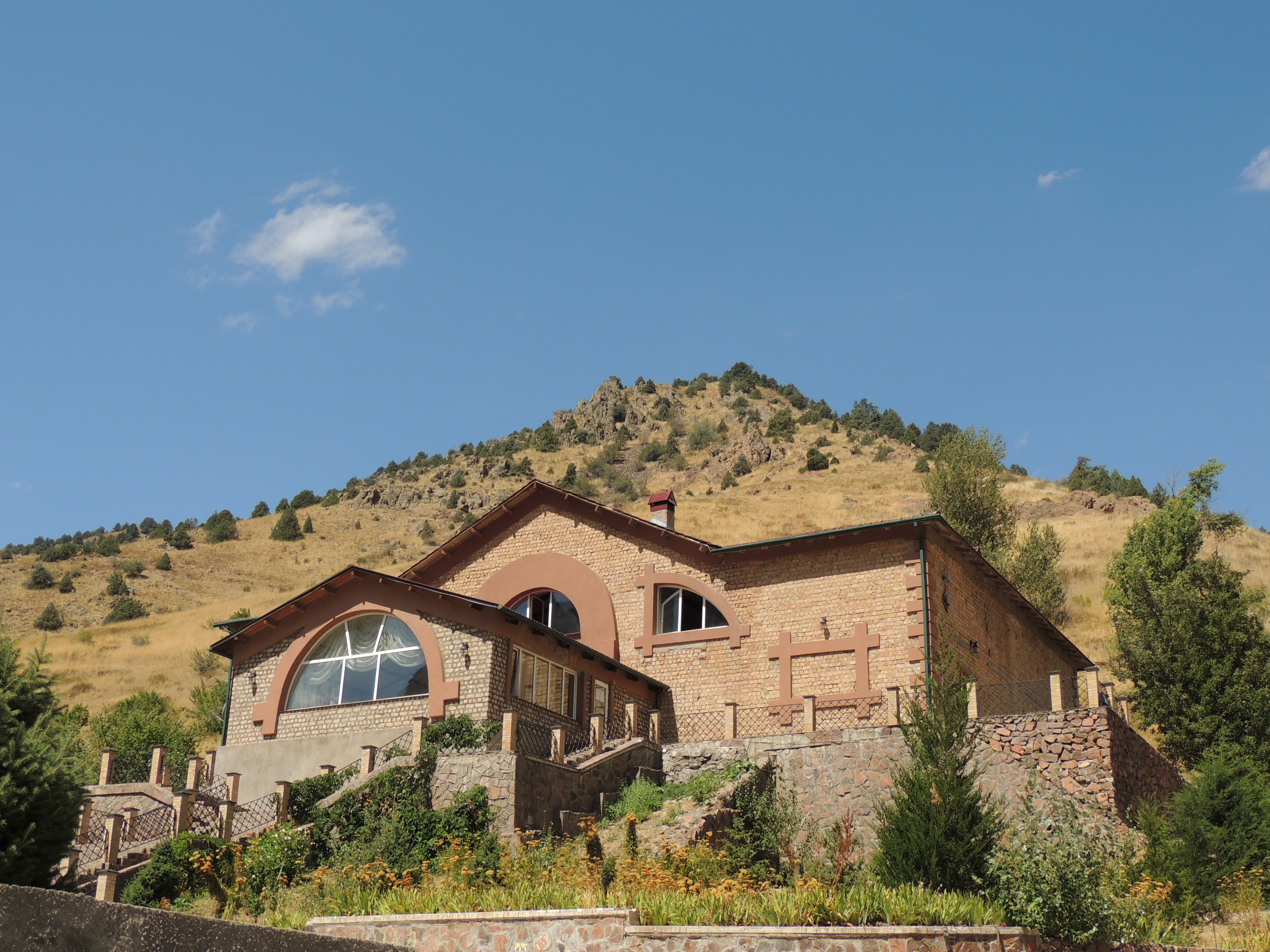
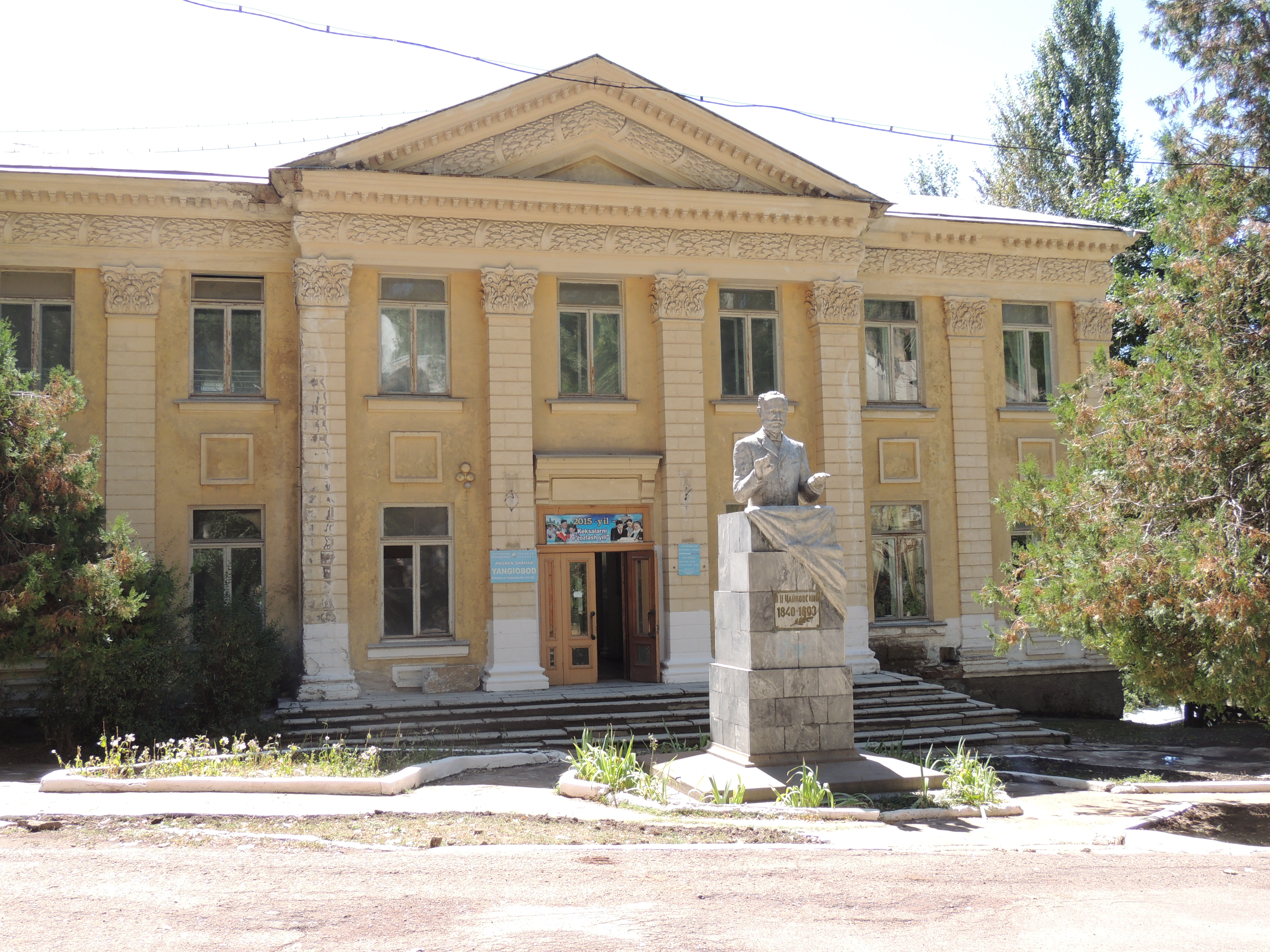

- Location in Uzbekistan
- Coordinates: 41°07′09″N 70°05′39″E
- Country: Uzbekistan
- Region: Tashkent Region
- City: Angren

Population (2016)
  - Total: 8,900
- Time zone: UTC+5 (UZT)

Yangiobod (Uzbek: Yangiobod) is a city located in the Angren municipality of Tashkent Region, Uzbekistan. Its population is 8,900 (2016).

A secret town during the Soviet Union because of the uranium mine present, these days no uranium is mined anymore and the town is known as a summer holiday resort for locals from Tashkent. A couple of kilometers from the town there is a mineral water spring which is mainstream in the town and different urban areas.

In 2021 preparations for the environmental remediation at the former mine, and also at Charkesar, started with the assistance of a €2 million grant from the European Bank for Reconstruction and Development.
