= Pop District =

Coordinates: 40.8667°N 71.2000°E

Pop
- District
- Pop tumani
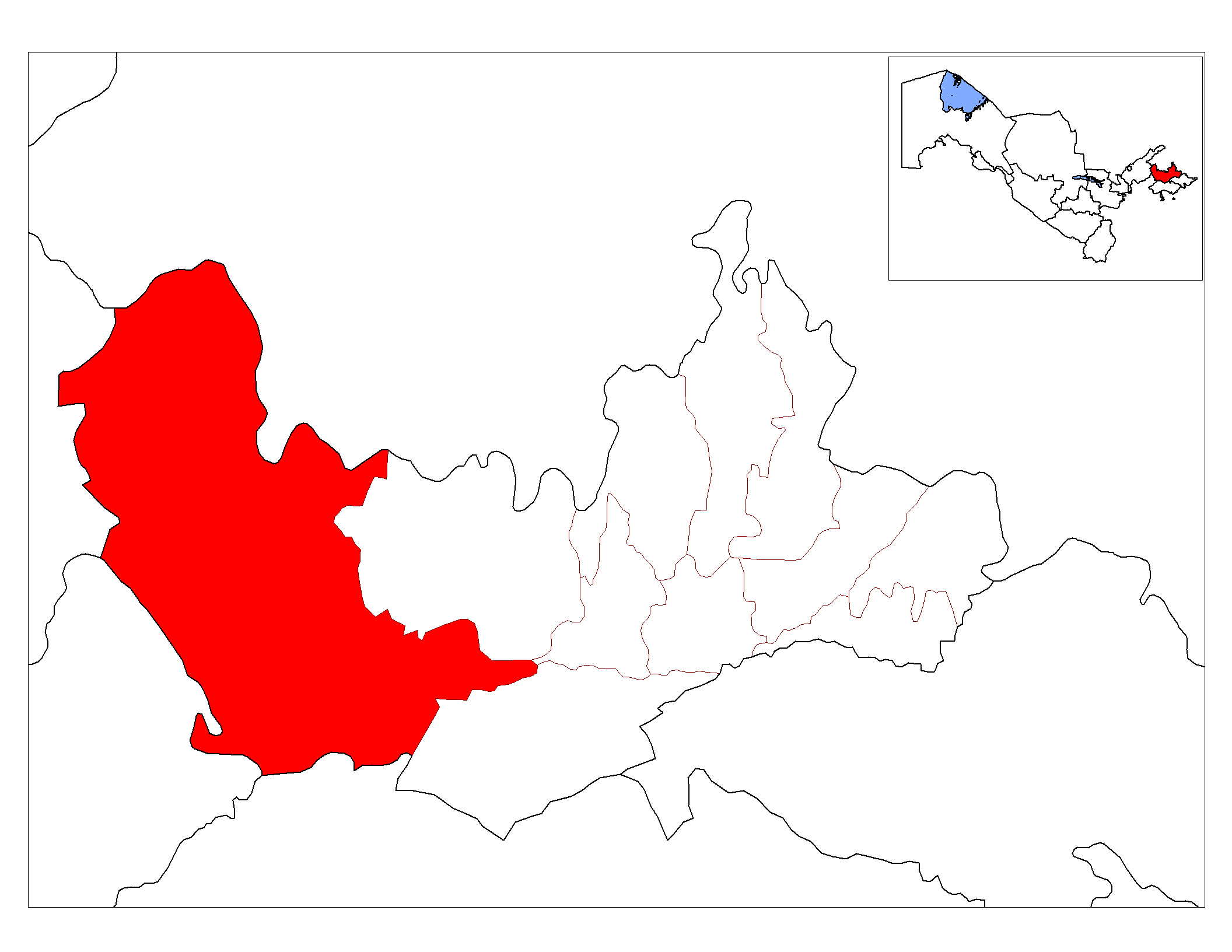
- Country: Uzbekistan
- Region: Namangan Region
- Capital: Pop
- Established: 1926

Area
  - Total: 2,910 km^{2} (1,120 sq mi)

Population (2021)
  - Total: 222,700
  - Density: 76.5/km^{2} (198/sq mi)
- Time zone: UTC+5 (UZT)

Pop is a district of Namangan Region in Uzbekistan. The capital lies at the city Pop. Its area is 741 km^{2}. Its population is 222,700 (2021 est.).

The district consists of one city (Pop), 15 urban-type settlements (Oltinkon, Navbahor, Uygʻursoy, Xalqobod, Chorkesar, Uygʻur, Yangi Xoʻjaobod, Sang, Gʻurumsaroy, Qandigʻon, Pungon, Chodak, Madaniyat, Qurgʻonobod, Chorkesar-2) and 10 rural communities.
