= Turkic Khaganate =

The Göktürks founded two major khanates known as the Turkic Khaganate:

- First Turkic Khaganate, which then fractured into
  - Western Turkic Khaganate
  - Eastern Turkic Khaganate
- Second Turkic Khaganate
