= Angren (river) =

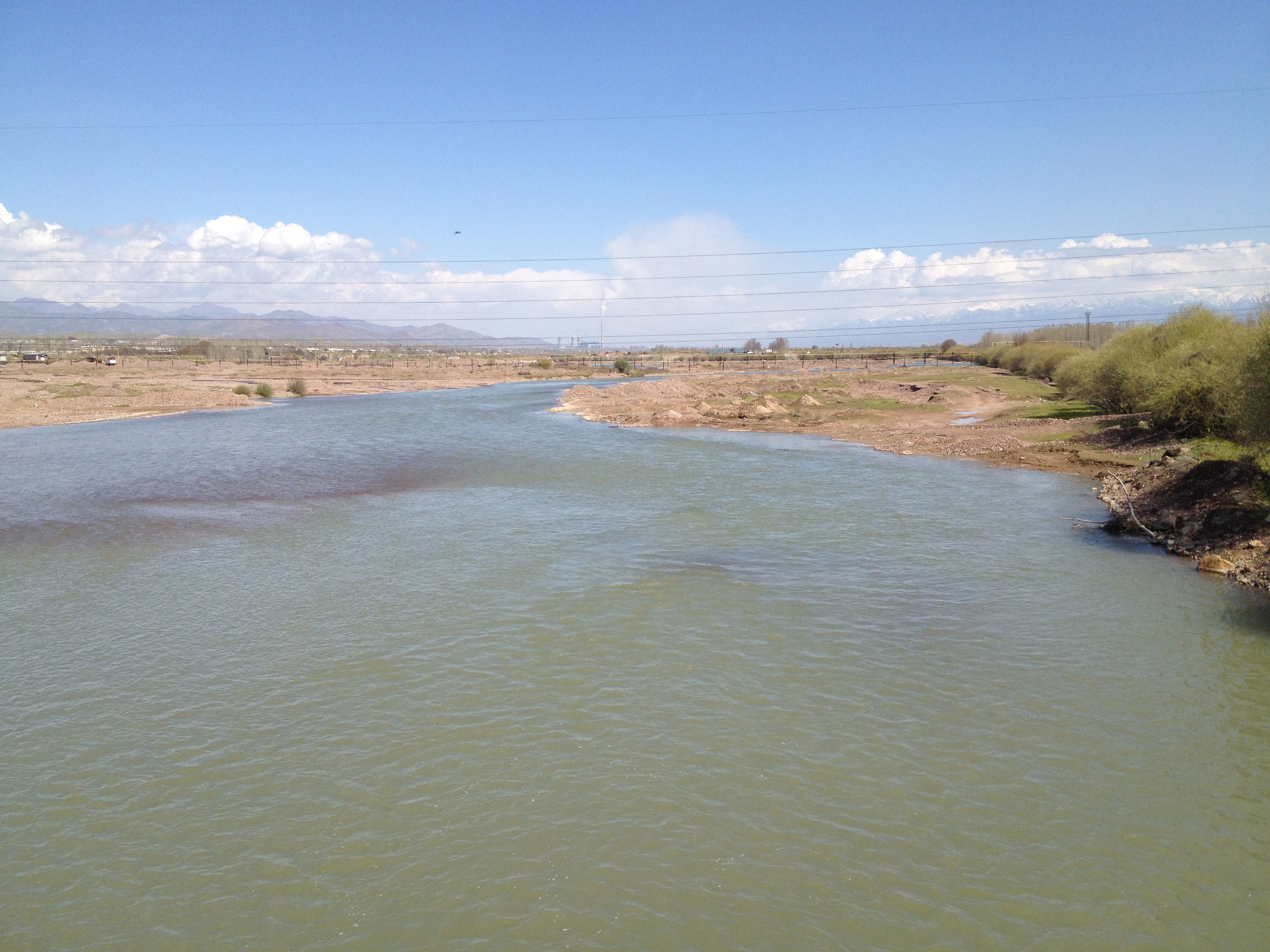
- Angren river in Ohangaron

Location
- Country: Uzbekistan

Physical characteristics
- Mouth: Syr Darya
  - coordinates: 40.7922°N 68.8322°E
- Length: 223 km (139 mi)
- Basin size: 5,260 km^{2} (2,030 sq mi)

Basin features
- Progression: Syr Darya→ North Aral Sea

The Angren (Russian: Ангрен, Uzbek: Ohangaron, Persian: آهنگران), also known as Achangaran, is a river in Tashkent Region of Uzbekistan. The river is 223 kilometres (139 mi) long, and has a basin area of 5,260 square kilometres (2,030 mi^{2}). It flows through the town of Angren. The Angren is a right tributary of the Syr Darya.

A dam is built over the river.
