= Pop, Uzbekistan =

Pop
- City
- Location in Uzbekistan
- Coordinates: 40°52′24.96″N 71°6′32.04″E
- Country: Uzbekistan
- Region: Namangan Region
- District: Pop District
- Town status: 1980
- Elevation: 439 m (1,440 ft)

Population (2023)
  - Total: 30,000
- Time zone: UTC+5 (UZT)
- Postal code: 160500
- Area code: +9986943

Pop (Uzbek: Pop/Поп, Russian: Пап, romanized: Pap) is a city in Namangan Region, Uzbekistan. It is the administrative center of Pop District. Its population is 26,900 (2016). At Pop, the Angren–Pop railway line (opened in 2016) joins the line from Kokand to Namangan.

Number of secondary schools — six (6): No. 1, No. 8, No. 23, No. 37, No. 40, No. 65, No. 67.

Number of secondary special educational institutions — three (3): boarding school No. 11, Medical college, Business college.

Pop town consists of 14 district-units:

- Kelachi
- Khamza
- Shomazor
- Olmazor
- Obod
- Tinchlik
- Khazrati bob
- Uzbekistan
- Ipak Yuli
- Dustlik
- Pakhtakor
- Alisher Navoi
- Khamid Olimjon
- Abdulla Kakhhar
