= Xalqobod, Namangan Region =

Xalqobod
- urban-type settlement
- Location in Uzbekistan
- Coordinates: 40°52′15″N 71°09′26″E
- Country: Uzbekistan
- Region: Namangan Region
- District: Pop District
- Urban-type settlement: 1966

Population (1989)
  - Total: 6,429
- Time zone: UTC+5 (UZT)

Xalqobod (Uzbek: Xalqobod/Халқобод, Russian: Халкабад, romanized: Khalkabad) is an urban-type settlement in Namangan Region, Uzbekistan. It is part of Pop District. The town population in 1989 was 6429 people.
