= Angren, Uzbekistan =

Angren Angren/Ангрен
- City
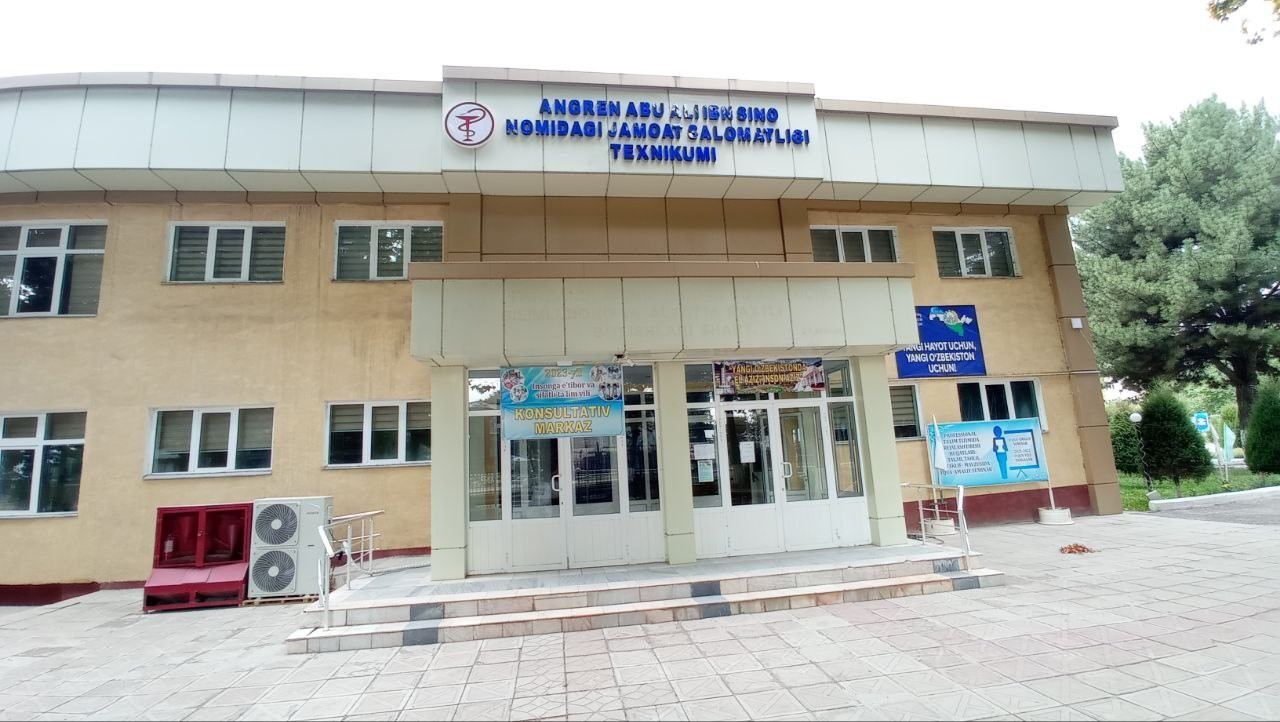
- Medical school in Angren

- Location in Uzbekistan
- Coordinates: 41°1′0″N 70°8′37″E
- Country: Uzbekistan
- Region: Tashkent Region
- Founded: 1941
- City status: 1946

Area
  - Total: 150 km^{2} (58 sq mi)
- Elevation: 961 m (3,153 ft)

Population (2021)
  - Total: 191,300
  - Density: 1,300/km^{2} (3,300/sq mi)
- Time zone: UTC+5 (UZT)
- Postal code: 110200
- Area code: +998 7066

Angren (Uzbek: Angren/Ангрен; Tajik: Ангрен) is a district-level city in Tashkent Region, eastern Uzbekistan. The city is located on the Angren River 70 mi (110 km) to the east of Tashkent. The City of Angren was created in 1946 from the villages of Jigariston, Jartepa, Teshiktosh, and Qoʻyxona which had emerged in the rich Angren coal basin during World War II. It has an area of 150 km^{2} (58 sq mi) and the population of the city is 191,300 (2021).

There were several large coal mines and factories in Angren during Soviet times. Following the collapse of the USSR, the majority of these factories were abandoned. A lack of professionals and machinery, mismanagement, and falling income levels — all contributed to this downfall. While Angren was once an important industrial center, the collapse caused it to turn into a ghost town for a while. However, in the recent days, Angren has developed and still is developing.

Still, Angren has retained some of its industrial importance. The city is home to a once considerable and still functioning coal mining industry. It also has a large construction-materials industry, a rubber processing plant, and a power station. There are a few supermarkets across the town. Angren University was founded in January, 2023.

== History ==
The current name of the city is a Russification of the Persian word ohangaron which means "blacksmiths." In 1936, first geological explorations were carried out in the Angren Valley. In 1940, the first coal mine was built in the area and it became operational in 1942. In 1941, Angren and Tashkent were connected with a railway line.

During World War II, several settlements, namely, the villages of Jigariston, Jartepa, Teshiktosh, and Qoʻyxona grew up in the area. On June 13, 1946, the Supreme Soviet of the Uzbek SSR issued a decree to create the City of Angren from these settlements. In his book The Gulag Archipelago, Aleksandr Solzhenitsyn mentioned Angren as one of the Soviet towns that grew up next to a gulag labor camp.

Later it turned out that most of the city had been built above coal seams. Therefore, in 1956 Angren was moved to a different area 7–8 km (4.3–5.0 mi) to the south-west of its original location.

Angren was an important industrial city in the Soviet Union. After the dissolution of the USSR, the majority of ethnic Russians and Tatars living in Angren left the city. There were many experienced workers among those who left. In the 1990s, almost all of the factories in the city were closed down as a result of a lack professionals, disruption of Soviet trade routes, ageing machinery, and mismanagement. Nowadays Angren is often referred to as a ghost town.

== Geography ==
Angren is located in the eastern part of Tashkent region, on the Angren River 70 mi (110 km) to the east of Tashkent. On the north-west of Angren is the Chatkal Range. On the south and south west of the city is the Kurama Range. The mountains that surround Angren rise up to 2,500–3,500 m (8,200–11,500 ft) above sea level.

The territory of the city of Angren includes the city Yangiobod and the urban-type settlements Krasnogorsk, Nurobod, Bekobod, Ohangaron, Chirchiq and Yangiyoʻl.

=== Climate ===
The weather is relatively cool and pleasantly windy. Angren has a Mediterranean climate (Köppen climate classification Csa) with cold winters and hot summers. The average July temperature is 27 °C (81 °F). The mean temperature in January is −2 °C (28 °F).

Climate data for Angren (1991–2020)
Month	Jan	Feb	Mar	Apr	May	Jun	Jul	Aug	Sep	Oct	Nov	Dec	Year
Mean daily maximum °C (°F)	5.8 (42.4)	7.5 (45.5)	13.5 (56.3)	19.8 (67.6)	25.0 (77.0)	30.1 (86.2)	32.4 (90.3)	31.4 (88.5)	26.9 (80.4)	20.2 (68.4)	13.1 (55.6)	7.6 (45.7)	19.4 (66.9)
Daily mean °C (°F)	1.1 (34.0)	2.6 (36.7)	8.2 (46.8)	13.9 (57.0)	18.9 (66.0)	23.8 (74.8)	25.9 (78.6)	24.6 (76.3)	19.7 (67.5)	13.1 (55.6)	7.1 (44.8)	2.8 (37.0)	13.5 (56.3)
Mean daily minimum °C (°F)	−2.3 (27.9)	−1.0 (30.2)	4.2 (39.6)	9.2 (48.6)	13.6 (56.5)	18.0 (64.4)	19.4 (66.9)	18.0 (64.4)	13.0 (55.4)	7.6 (45.7)	2.9 (37.2)	−0.7 (30.7)	8.5 (47.3)
Average precipitation mm (inches)	74.8 (2.94)	95.1 (3.74)	94.6 (3.72)	83.5 (3.29)	51.0 (2.01)	23.4 (0.92)	9.1 (0.36)	5.3 (0.21)	9.0 (0.35)	36.7 (1.44)	69.5 (2.74)	81.4 (3.20)	633.4 (24.94)
Average precipitation days (≥ 1.0 mm)	13	14	14	13	11	8	4	3	4	8	10	13	115
Source: NOAA

== Demographics ==
Historical population
Year	Pop.	±% p.a.
1969	94,000	—
1985	122,000	+1.64%
2000	130,000	+0.42%
2005	126,962	−0.47%
2021	191,300	+2.60%

Prior to the collapse of the Soviet Union, Angren had a significant Russian population. The population of the city declined in the 1990s because of poor living conditions, unemployment, and mass emigration. In 2005, Angren had a population of 130,000. Uzbeks, Tajiks and Russians are the largest ethnic groups. However, the population has been increasing steadily for the past few years because of the migration of people from other regions of the country.

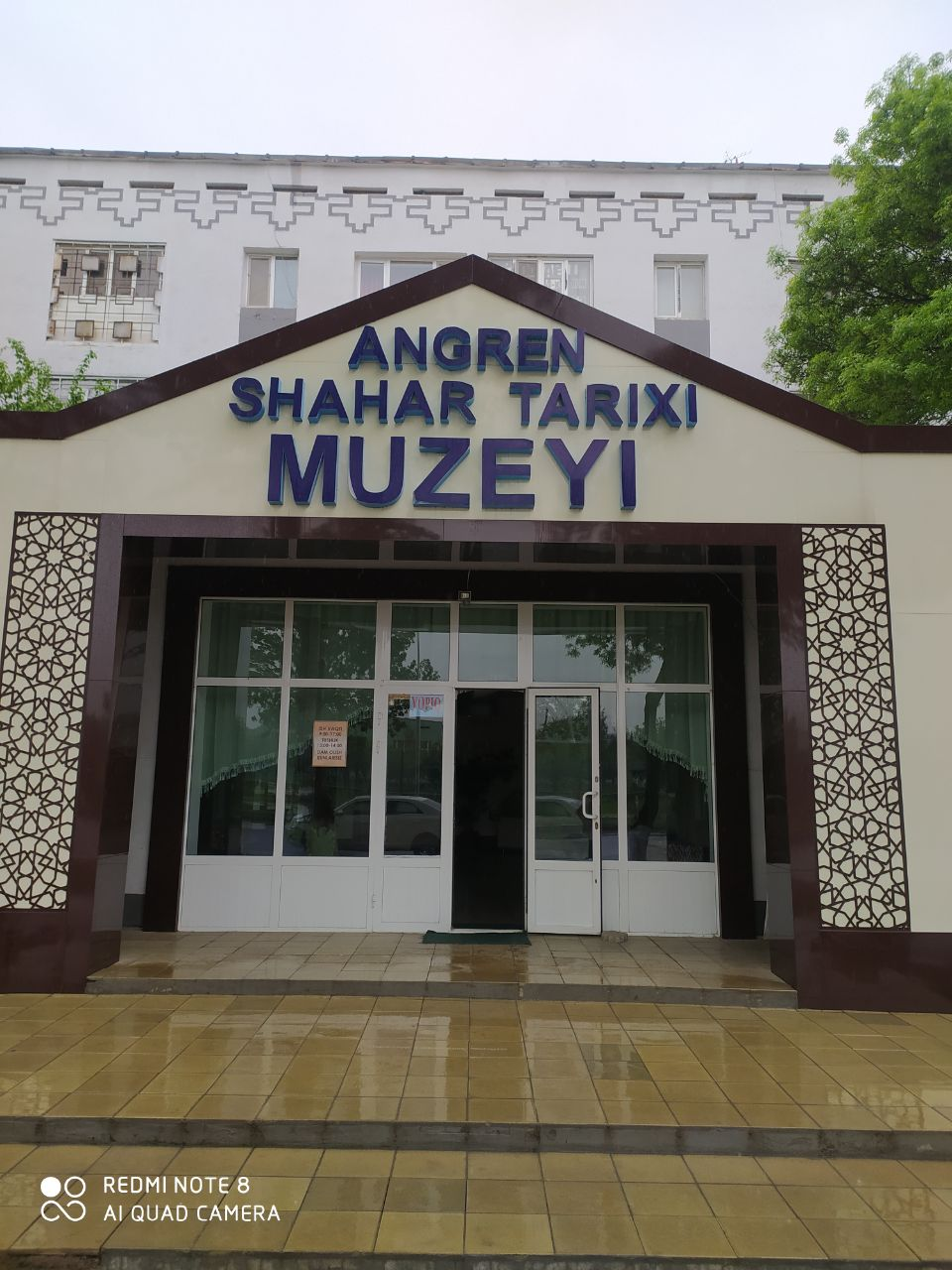
Museum

== Economy ==
Angren has retained some of its industrial importance. The city is home to a once considerable and still functioning coal mining industry. Angren's coal reserves represent almost one quarter of Central Asia's coal supplies. Two thirds of Angren's coal is extracted using the surface mining method. The city also has a large construction-materials industry, a rubber processing plant, and a power station.

== Education ==
The Angren Pedagogical Institute was the largest higher education institute in Angren. The city is also home to technical and medical universities, several academic lyceums, three music schools, and one sports school.

== Notable people ==
- Bakhtiyar Gulyamov, current Ambassador of Uzbekistan to the United States
- Alexander Geynrikh, a regular for the Uzbekistan national football team
- Ilyos Zeytulayev, a regular for the Uzbekistan national football team
- Osman Pashayev, Ukrainian and Crimean Tatar journalist.
