= List of leaders of Uzbekistan =

Below is the list of leaders of present-day Uzbekistan since the establishment of Uzbek SSR in 1924.

== Rulers ==
=== Khans of Shaybanid Domains ===
These are the khans ruling over the domains of the Uzbeks prior to the Abulkhairids.

- Shiban
- Bahadur Oghul
- Jochi Buqa
- Bad Oghul
- Mengu Timur Oghlan
- Fulad Oghul
- Ibrahim Sultan
- Dawlat Shaykh Oghlan

=== Abulkhairids ===
- Abu'l-Khayr Khan, son of Dawlat Shaykh Oghlan
- Sheikh Haidar, son of Abu'l-Khayr, died in battle in 1471 against Ibak Khan
- Muhammad Shaybani, grandson of Abu'l-Khayr Khan

=== Timurid Empire ===
Titular name	Personal name	Reign
Timur ruled over the Chagatai Khanate with Soyurghatmïsh Khan as nominal Khan followed by Sultan Mahmud Khan. He himself adopted the Muslim Arabic title of Amir. In essence the Khanate was finished and the Timurid Empire was firmly established.
Amir امیر; Timur Lang تیمور لنگ	Timur Beg Gurkani تیمور بیگ گورکانی	1370–1405
Amir امیر	Pir Muhammad bin Jahangir Mirza پیر محمد بن جہانگیر میرزا	1405–1407
Amir امیر	Khalil Sultan bin Miran Shah خلیل سلطان بن میران شاہ	1405–1409
Amir امیر	Shahrukh Mirza شاھرخ میرزا	1405–1447
Amir امیر; Ulugh Beg الغ بیگ	Mirza Muhammad Tāraghay میرزا محمد طارق	1447–1449
Division of Timurid Empire

Transoxiana	Khurasan/Herat/Fars/Iraq-e-Ajam
Abdal-Latif Mirza میرزا عبداللطیف; Padarkush (Father Killer); 1449–1450	Ala al-Dawla Mirza علاء الدولہ میرزا بن بایسنقر ?; Abul-Qasim Babur Mirza میرزا ابوالقاسم بابر بن بایسنقر 1449–1457; Sultan Muhammad سلطان محمد ابن بایسنقر 1447–1451
Abdullah Mirza میرزا عبد اللہ; 1450–1451	Abul-Qasim Babur Mirza میرزا ابوالقاسم بابر بن بایسنقر; 1451–1457
	Mirza Shah Mahmud میرزا شاہ محمود; 1457
	Ibrahim Sultan ابراھیم میرزا; 1457–1459
Abu Sa'id Mirza ابو سعید میرزا (Although Abu Sa'id Mirza re-united most of the Timurid heartland in Central Asia with the help of Uzbek Chief, Abul-Khayr Khan (grandfather of Muhammad Shayabani Khan), he agreed to divide Iran with the Black Sheep Turkomen under Jahan Shah, but the White Sheep Turkomen under Uzun Hassan defeated and killed first Jahan Shah and then Abu Sa'id. After Abu Sa'id's death another era of fragmentation follows.); 1451–1469
**Transoxiana is divided	Sultan Husayn Bayqara سلطان حسین میرزا بایقرا; 1469 1st reign
	Yadgar Muhammad Mirza میرزا یادگار محمد; 1470 (6 weeks)
	Sultan Husayn Bayqara سلطان حسین میرزا بایقرا; 1470–1506 2nd reign
	Badi' al-Zaman Mirza بدیع الزمان میرزا 1506–1507; Muzaffar Husayn Mirza مظفر حسین میرزا 1506–1507
	Uzbeks under Muhammad Shayabak Khan Conquer Herat

- Abu Sa'id's sons divided Transoxiana upon his death, into Samarkand, Bukhara, Hissar, Balkh, Kabul and Farghana.

Samarkand	Bukhara	Hissar	Farghana	Balkh	Kabul
Sultan Ahmad Mirza سلطان احمد میرزا; 1469–1494			Umar Shaikh Mirza II عمر شیخ میرزا ثانی; 1469–1494	Sultan Mahmud Mirza سلطان محمود میرزا; 1469–1495	Ulugh Beg Mirza II میرزا الغ بیگ; 1469 – 1502
Sultan Baysonqor Mirza bin Mahmud Mirza بایسنقر میرزا بن محمود میرزا; 1495–1497	Sultan Ali bin Mahmud Mirza سلطان علی بن محمود میرزا; 1495–1500	Sultan Masud Mirza bin Mahmud Mirza سلطان مسعود بن محمود میرزا; 1495 – ?	Zahir-ud-din Muhammad Babur ظہیر الدین محمد بابر; 1494–1497	Khusrau Shah خسرو شاہ (Usurper) ? – 1504	Mukim Beg Arghun مقیم ارغون (Usurper) ? – 1504
Uzbeks under Muhammad Shayabak Khan محمد شایبک خان ازبک; 1500–1501			Jahangir Mirza II جہانگیر میرزا (puppet of Sultan Ahmed Tambol); 1497 – 1503	Zahir-ud-din Muhammad Babur ظہیر الدین محمد بابر; 1504–1504	
Uzbeks under Muhammad Shayabak Khan محمد شایبک خان ازبک; 1503–1504					Zahir-ud-din Muhammad Babur ظہیر الدین محمد بابر; 1504–1511
Zahir-ud-din Muhammad Babur ظہیر الدین محمد بابر (Never till his conquest of India were the dominions of Babur as extensive as at this period. Like his grandfather Abu Sa'id Mirza, he managed to re-unite the Timurid heartland in Central Asia with the help of Shah of Iran, Ismail I. His dominions stretched from the Caspian Sea and the Ural Mountains to the farthest limits of Ghazni and comprehended Kabul and Ghazni;Kunduz and Hissar; Samarkand and Bukhara; Farghana; Tashkent and Seiram); 1511–1512
Uzbeks under Ubaydullah Sultan عبید اللہ سلطان re-conquer Transoxiana and Balkh; 1512					Zahir-ud-din Muhammad Babur ظہیر الدین محمد بابر; 1512–1530
Timurid Empire in Central Asia becomes extinct under the Khanate of Bukhara of the Uzbeks. However, Timurid dynasty moves on to conquer India under the leadership of Zahir-ud-din Muhammad Babur in 1526 C.E. and established the Timurid dynasty of India.

== List of rulers ==
=== Shaybanids ===
- Muhammad Shaybani (1501 – 1510)
- Suyunchkhodja Khan (1511 – 1512)
- Kuchkunji Khan (1512 – 1531)
- Abu Sa'id bin Kochkunju (1531 – 1534)
- Ubaydullah Sultan (1534 – 1539)
- Abdullah Khan I (1539 – 1540)
- Abdal-Latif bin Kochkunju (1540 – 1552)
- Nawruz Ahmed (1552 – 1556)
- Pir Muhammad Khan I (1556 – 1561)
- Iskander bin Jani Beg (1561 – 1583)
- Abdullah Khan II (1583 – 1598)
- Abdul-Mo'min bin Abdullah Khan (1598 – 1598)
- Pir Muhammad Khan II (1598 – 1599)

=== Janids ===
- Baqi Muhammad Khan (1599–1605)
- Vali Muhammad Khan (1605–1611)
- Imam Quli Khan (1611–1642)
- Nadr Muhammad Khan (1642–1645)
- Abd al-Aziz Khan (1645–1680)
- Subhan Quli Khan (1680–1702)
- Muhammad Ubaidullah Khan (1702 – 18 March 1711)
- Abu al-Fayz Khan (1711–1747)
- Muhammad Abd al-Mumin (1747–1748)
- Muhammad Ubaidullah II (1748–1753, nominal)

=== Manghits ===
- Muhammad Rahim (usurper), atalik (1753–1756), khan (1756–1758)
- Shir Ghazi (1758–?)
- Abu'l-Ghazi Khan (1758–1785)

== Amirs/Emirs of Bukhara (1785–1920) ==
Titular Name	Personal Name	Reign
Ataliq اتالیق	Khudayar Bey خدایار بیگ	?
Ataliq اتالیق	Muhammad Hakim محمد حکیم	?–1747
Ataliq اتالیق	Muhammad Rahim محمد رحیم	1747–1753
Amir امیر	Muhammad Rahim محمد رحیم	1753–1756
Khan خان	Muhammad Rahim محمد رحیم	1756–1758
Ataliq اتالیق	Daniyal Biy دانیال بیگ	1758–1785
Amir Masum امیر معصوم	Shahmurad شاہ مراد بن دانیال بیگ	1785–1799
Amir امیر	Haydar bin Shahmurad حیدر تورہ بن شاہ مراد	1799–1826
Amir امیر	Mir Hussein bin Haydar حسین بن حیدر تورہ	1826–1827
Amir امیر	Umar bin Haydar عمر بن حیدر تورہ	1827
Amir امیر	Nasr-Allah bin Haydar Tora نصراللہ بن حیدر تورہ	1827–1860
Amir امیر	Muzaffar bin Nasrullah مظفر الدین بن نصراللہ	1860–1885
Amir امیر	Abdul-Ahad bin Muzaffar al-Din عبد الأحد بن مظفر الدین	1885–1911
Amir امیر	Muhammad Alim Khan bin Abdul-Ahad محمد عالم خان بن عبد الأحد	1911–1920
Overthrow of Emirate of Bukhara by Bukharan People's Soviet Republic.

- Pink Rows denote progenitor chiefs serving as Tutors (Ataliqs) & Viziers to the Khans of Bukhara.
- Green Rows denote chiefs who took over reign of government from the Janids and placed puppet Khans.
- A photo of Mohammed Alim Khan, final emir 1911–1920, is shown at Emir.

== Chairmen of the Central Executive Committee ==
1. Kobozev, Pyotr Alekseevich (April – May 1918), Solkin, Andrey Fedorovich, contributor (April – 2 June 1918)
2. Tobolin, Ivan Osipovich (2 June – 5 October 1918)
3. Votintsev, Vsevolod Dmitrievich (October 1918 – 19 January 1919)
4. – (19 January – 31 March 1919)
5. Kazakov, Aristarkh Andreevich (31 March – July 1919)
6. Kobozev, Pyotr Alekseevich (July – September 1919)
7. Apin, Ivan Andreevich (September 1919 – January 1920)
8. Ryskulov, Turar Ryskulovich (January – 21 July 1920)
9. Biserov, Mukhammedzhan (21 July – August 1920)
10. Rakhimbaev, Abdullo Rakhimbaevich (4 August 1920 – May 1921), Khodzhanov Sultanbek, acting, prev. (12 May 1920 – ?)
11. Tyuryakulov, Nazir Tyuryakulovich (May 1921 – June 1922)
12. Rakhimbaev, Abdullo Rakhimbaevich (June – October 1922)
13. Khidir-Aliev, Inagadzhan (October 1922 – 1 January 1924), Dadabaev Butabay, vrid. prev. (August – September 1923)
14. Aytakov, Nedirbai (9 January – November 1924)

Chairmen of the Council of People's Commissars ("Turksovnarkom").

Initial date	Final date	Name
15 November 1917	November 1918	Fyodor Kolesov
November 1918	19 January 1919	Vladislav Figelskiy (ru)
19 January 1919	31 March 1919	Post vacant
31 March 1919	12 September 1919	Karp Sorokin (ru)
12 September 1919	March 1920	Turksovnarkom defunct
March 1920	May 1920	Jānis Rudzutaks
May 1920	September 1920	Isidor Lubimov
19 September 1920	October 1922	Kaikhaziz Atabayev
October 1922	12 January 1924	Turar Ryskulov
12 January 1924	27 October 1924	Sharustam Islamov (ru)

== Political leaders ==
Denotes Acting leader

Name	Took office	Left office	Party	Notes
Chairmen of the Central Revolutionary Committee
Mirzo Abduqodir Mansurovich Mukhitdinov	2 September 1920	22 September 1921	Communist Party of Bukhara	Styled Chairman of the Provisional Revolutionary Committee from 2 September to 6 October 1920
Polat Usmon Khodzhayev	25 September 1921	8 December 1921	Communist Party of Bukhara	
Chairmen of the Presidium of the Central Executive Committee
Polat Usmon Khodzhayev	23 September 1921	12 April 1922	Communist Party of Bukhara	
Muin Jon Aminov	12 April 1922	18 August 1922	Communist Party of Bukhara	
Porsa Khodzhayev	18 August 1922	27 October 1924	Communist Party of Bukhara	
Chairmen of the Council of People’s Nazirs (Ministers)
Fayzulla Xoʻjayev	8 October 1920	19 April 1923	Communist Party of Bukhara	
Mirzo Abduqodir Mansurovich Mukhitdinov	15 June 1923	27 October 1924	Communist Party of Bukhara	

== Leaders of the Uzbek SSR (1924–1991) ==
=== Uzbek Soviet Socialist Republic (1924–1991) ===
==== First Secretaries of the Communist Party ====
No.	Portrait	Name (birth-death)	Term of office		Political party
No.	Portrait	Name (birth-death)	Took office	Left office	Political party
1		Vladimir Ivanov (1893–1938)	12 February 1925	21 September 1927	OʻzKP/CPSU
2		Kuprian Kirkizh (1886–1932)	21 September 1927	April 1929	OʻzKP/CPSU
3		Nikolay Gikalo (1897–1938)	April 1929	June 1929	OʻzKP/CPSU
4		Isaak Zelensky (1890–1938)	June 1929	December 1929	OʻzKP/CPSU
5		Akmal Ikramov (1898–1938)	December 1929	21 September 1937	OʻzKP/CPSU
6		Pyotr Yakovlev	21 September 1937	27 September 1937	OʻzKP/CPSU
7		Usman Yusupov (1901–1966)	27 September 1937	7 April 1950	OʻzKP/CPSU
8		Amin Niyazov (1903–1973)	7 April 1950	22 December 1955	OʻzKP/CPSU
9		Nuritdin Mukhitdinov (1917–2008)	22 December 1955	28 December 1957	OʻzKP/CPSU
10		Sobir Kamolov (1910–1990)	28 December 1957	15 March 1959	OʻzKP/CPSU
11		Sharof Rashidov (1917–1983)	15 March 1959	31 October 1983	OʻzKP/CPSU
12		Inomjon Usmonxoʻjayev (1930–2017)	31 October 1983	12 January 1988	OʻzKP/CPSU
13		Rafiq Nishonov (1926–2023)	12 January 1988	23 June 1989	OʻzKP/CPSU
14		Islam Karimov (1938–2016)	23 June 1989	31 August 1991	OʻzKP/CPSU

== Presidents of the Republic of Uzbekistan (1991–present) ==
Political parties

Communist Party of Uzbekistan (OʻzKP)
People's Democratic Party of Uzbekistan (XDP)
Uzbekistan Liberal Democratic Party (OʻzLiDeP)
Uzbekistan National Revival Democratic Party (OʻzMTDP)

Status

Denotes Acting President

Symbols

^{C} Constitutional referendum

^{†} Died in office

No.	Portrait	Name (Birth–Death)	Elected	Term of office			Political party
No.	Portrait	Name (Birth–Death)	Elected	Took office	Left office	Time in office	Political party
		Islam Karimov (1938–2016)	1990	24 March 1990	2 September 2016^{[†]}	26 years, 162 days	OʻzKP
1		Islam Karimov (1938–2016)	1991; 1995^{[C]} 2000; 2002^{[C]}	24 March 1990	2 September 2016^{[†]}	26 years, 162 days	XDP
		Islam Karimov (1938–2016)	2007; 2015	24 March 1990	2 September 2016^{[†]}	26 years, 162 days	OʻzLiDeP
—		Nigmatilla Yuldashev (1962–); Acting	—	2 September 2016	8 September 2016	6 days	OʻzMTDP
—		Shavkat Mirziyoyev (1957–)	—	8 September 2016	14 December 2016	97 days	OʻzMTDP
2		Shavkat Mirziyoyev (1957–)	2016; 2021	14 December 2016	Incumbent	9 years, 308 days	OʻzLiDeP
		Shavkat Mirziyoyev (1957–)	2023	14 December 2016	Incumbent	9 years, 308 days	Independent

== First ladies of Uzbekistan ==
No.	Image	Name (Birth-Death)	Term in office			President (Birth-Death)	Note
No.	Image	Name (Birth-Death)	Term start	Term end	Time in office	President (Birth-Death)	Note
1		Tatyana Karimova (born 1948)	1 September 1991	2 September 2016	25 years, 1 day	Islam Karimov (1938-2016)	
Vacant; Nigmatilla Yuldashev never married			2 September 2016	14 December 2016	103 days	Nigmatilla Yuldashev (born 1962)	
2		Ziroat Mirziyoyeva (born 1957)	14 December 2016	Incumbent	9 years, 308 days	Shavkat Mirziyoyev (born 1957)	

== Vice presidents of Uzbekistan ==
The position of was introduced on the same day Islam Karimov was elected President of the Uzbek SSR on March 24, 1990 at a session of the Supreme Council of the Uzbek SSR. Uzbekistan at that point became the first union republic to introduce the positions of president and vice president, roles often seen in the west. The only person who served as vice president was Shukrullo Mirsaidov, who, before this position, was the Chairman of the Council of Ministers of the Uzbek SSR. After the abolition of the post of vice president on January 8, 1992, the post of prime minister was introduced in the country.

Name	Took office	Left office
Shukrullo Mirsaidov	March 1990	8 January 1992

== Rank by time in office ==
Rank	President	Time in office	
1	Islam Karimov	25 years, 1 day	
2	Shavkat Mirziyoyev	9 years, 308 days	10 years, 40 days
—	Shavkat Mirziyoyev	97 days (Acting)	10 years, 40 days
—	Nigmatilla Yuldashev	6 days (Acting)	

== Prime ministers of Uzbekistan ==
#	Image	Name	Term of office		Party
1		Muhammad Dawlat	1756	1785	
2		Utkur Sufi Biy	1785	1812	
3		Muhammad Hakim Biy	1812	1837	
4		Mirza Aziz Biy	1837	1869	
5		Muhammad Yakub Biy	1869	1870	
6		Muhammad Biy	1870	1899	
7		Astan Quli Biy	1899	1910	
8		Mirza Nasr Allah Biy	1910	1917	
9		Nizam ad-Din Khoja Urganji	1917	1917	
10		Usman Bek	1917	1917	
11		Fyodor Ivanovich Kolesov	1917	1918	
12		Vladislav Damyanovich Figelskiy	1918	1919	
13		Aristarkh Andreyvich Kazakov	1919	1919	
14		Karp Yeliseyevich Sorokin	1919	1919	
15		Artur Martynovich Kaktyn	1919	1919	
16		Yan Ernestovich Rudzutak	1920	1920	
17		Isidor Yevstigneyevich Lyubimov	1920	1920	
18		Kaygisyz Serdarovich Atabayev	1920	1922	
19		Turar Ryskulovich Ryskulov	1922	1924	
20		Sharustam Islamov	1924	1924	
21		Fayzulla Xojayev	17 February 1925	26 July 1937	
22		Abdullah Karimov	26 July 1937	2 October 1937	
23		Sultan Segizbayev	2 October 1937	23 July 1938	
24		Abdudzhabar Abdurakhmanov	23 July 1938	21 August 1950	
25		Abdurrazak Mavlyanov	21 August 1950	18 May 1951	
26		Nuritdin Mukhitdinov	18 May 1951	7 April 1953	
27		Usman Yusupov	7 April 1953	18 December 1954	
28		Nuritdin Mukhitdinov	18 December 1954	22 December 1955	
29		Sobir Kamolov	22 December 1955	30 December 1957	
30		Mansur Mirza-Akhmedov	30 December 1957	16 March 1959	
31		Arif Alimov	16 March 1959	27 September 1961	
32		Rahmankul Kurbanov	27 September 1961	25 February 1971	
33		Narmakhonmadi Khudayberdyev	25 February 1971	3 December 1984	
34		Gayrat Kadyrov	3 December 1984	21 October 1989	
35		Mirakhat Mirkasimov	21 October 1989	24 March 1990	
36		Shukrullo Mirsaidov	8 January 1990	8 January 1992	
37		Islam Karimov	8 January 1992	8 January 1992	
38		Abdulhashim Mutalov	8 January 1992	21 December 1995	People's Democratic Party of Uzbekistan
39		Oʻtkir Sultonov	21 December 1995	12 December 2003	People's Democratic Party of Uzbekistan
40		Shavkat Mirziyoyev	12 December 2003	14 December 2016	Self-Sacrifice National Democratic Party (until 2008); Uzbekistan National Revival Democratic Party (from 2008)
41		Abdulla Aripov	14 December 2016	Incumbent	Liberal Democratic Party

== See also ==
- Politics of Uzbekistan
- President of Uzbekistan
- Vice President of Uzbekistan
- Prime Minister of Uzbekistan
