= Politics of Uzbekistan =

The Republic of Uzbekistan is a semi-presidential constitutional republic, whereby the President of Uzbekistan is head of state. Executive power is exercised by the government and by the Prime Minister of Uzbekistan.

Legislative power is vested in the two chambers of the Oliy Majlis, the Senate and the Legislative Chamber. The judicial branch (or judiciary), is composed of the Supreme Court, Constitutional Court that exercises judicial power.

The movement toward economic reform in Uzbekistan has not been matched by a movement toward political reform. The government of Uzbekistan has instead tightened its grip since independence (September 1, 1991), cracking down increasingly on opposition groups. Although the names have changed, the institutions of government remain similar to those that existed before the breakup of the Soviet Union.

The government has justified its restraint of public assembly, opposition parties, and the media by emphasizing the need for stability and a gradual approach to change during the transitional period, citing the conflict and chaos in the other former republics (most convincingly, neighbouring Tajikistan). This approach has found credence among a large share of Uzbekistan's population, although such a position may not be sustainable in the long run.

Despite the trappings of institutional change, the first years of independence saw more resistance than acceptance of the institutional changes required for democratic reform to take hold. Whatever initial movement toward democracy existed in Uzbekistan in the early days of independence seems to have been overcome by the inertia of the remaining Soviet-style strong centralized leadership.

== Independence ==
In the Soviet era, Uzbekistan organized its government and its local communist party in conformity with the structure prescribed for all the republics. The Communist Party of the Soviet Union (CPSU) occupied the central position in ruling the country. The party provided both the guidance and the personnel for the government structure. The system was strictly bureaucratic: every level of government and every governmental body found its mirror image in the party. The instrument used by the CPSU to control the bureaucracy was the system of nomenklatura, a list of sensitive jobs in the government and other important organizations that could be filled only with party approval. The nomenklatura defined the Soviet political leadership, and the people on the list invariably were members of the CPSU.

Following the failure of the coup against the government of Mikhail Gorbachev in Moscow in August 1991, Uzbekistan's Supreme Soviet declared the independence of the republic, henceforth to be known as the Republic of Uzbekistan. At the same time, the Communist Party of Uzbekistan voted to cut its ties with the CPSU; three months later, it changed its name to the People's Democratic Party of Uzbekistan (PDPU), but the party leadership, under President Islam Karimov, remained in place. Independence brought a series of institutional changes, but the substance of governance in Uzbekistan changed much less dramatically.

On December 21, 1991, together with the leaders of ten other Soviet republics, Karimov agreed to dissolve the Soviet Union and form the Commonwealth of Independent States, of which Uzbekistan became a charter member according to the Alma-Ata Declaration. Shortly thereafter, Karimov was elected president of independent Uzbekistan in the new country's first contested election. Karimov drew 86% of the vote against opposition candidate Muhammad Salih (or Salikh), whose showing experts praised in view of charges that the election had been rigged. The major opposition party, Birlik, had been refused registration in time for the election.

In 1992 the PDPU retained the dominant position in the executive and legislative branches of government that the Communist Party of Uzbekistan had enjoyed. All true opposition groups were repressed and physically discouraged. Birlik, the original opposition party formed by intellectuals in 1989, was banned for allegedly subversive activities, establishing the Karimov regime's dominant rationalization for increased authoritarianism: Islamic fundamentalism threatened to overthrow the secular state and establish an Islamic regime similar to that in Iran.

The constitution ratified in December 1992 reaffirmed that Uzbekistan was a secular state. Although the constitution prescribed a new form of legislature, the PDPU-dominated Supreme Soviet remained in office for nearly two years until the first election to the new parliament, the Oliy Majlis, which took place in December 1994 and January 1995.

In 1993 Karimov's concern about the spread of Islamic fundamentalism spurred Uzbekistan's participation in the multinational CIS peacekeeping force sent to quell the civil war in nearby Tajikistan - a force that remained in place three years later because of continuing hostilities. Meanwhile, in 1993 and 1994 continued repression by the Karimov regime brought strong criticism from international human rights organizations.

In March 1995, Karimov took another step in the same direction by securing a 99% majority in a referendum on extending his term as president from the prescribed next election in 1997 to 2000.

In early 1995, Karimov announced a new policy of toleration for opposition parties and coalitions, apparently in response to the need to improve Uzbekistan's international commercial position. A few new parties were registered in 1995, although the degree of their opposition to the government was doubtful, and some imprisonments of opposition political figures continued.

The parliamentary election, the first held under the new constitution's guarantee of universal suffrage to all citizens 18 years of age or older, excluded all parties except the PDPU and the pro-government Progress of the Fatherland Party, despite earlier promises that all parties would be free to participate. The new, 250-seat Oliy Majlis included only 69 members elected as PDPU candidates, but an estimated 120 more deputies were PDPU members technically nominated to represent local councils rather than the PDPU. The result was that Karimov's solid majority continued after the new parliament went into the office.

== 1992 constitution ==
From the beginning of his presidency, Karimov remained nominally committed to instituting democratic reforms. A new constitution was adopted by the legislature in December 1992. Officially it created a separation of powers among a strong presidency, the Oliy Majlis, and the judiciary. In practice, however, these changes have been largely cosmetic. Although the language of the new constitution includes many democratic features, it can be superseded by executive decrees and legislation, and often constitutional law simply is ignored.

The president, who is directly elected to a five-year term that can be repeated once, is the head of state and is granted supreme executive power by the constitution. As commander in chief of the armed forces, the president also may declare a state of emergency or of war. The president is empowered to appoint the prime minister and full cabinet of ministers and the judges of the three national courts, subject to the approval of the Oliy Majlis, and to appoint all members of lower courts. The president also has the power to dissolve the parliament, in effect negating the Oliy Majlis's veto power over presidential nominations in a power struggle situation.

Deputies to the Oliy Majlis, the highest legislative body, are elected to five-year terms. The body may be dismissed by the president with the concurrence of the Constitutional Court; because that court is subject to presidential appointment, the dismissal clause weights the balance of power heavily toward the executive branch.

The Oliy Majlis enacts legislation, which may be initiated by the president, within the parliament, by the high courts, by the procurator general (highest law enforcement official in the country), or by the government of the Autonomous Province of Karakalpakstan. Besides legislation, international treaties, presidential decrees, and states of emergency also must be ratified by the Senate of Oliy Majlis.

The national judiciary includes the Supreme Court, the Constitutional Court, and the High Economic Court. Lower court systems exist at the regional, district, and town levels. Judges at all levels are appointed by the president and approved by the Oliy Majlis.

Nominally independent of the other branches of government, the courts remain under complete control of the executive branch. As in the system of the Soviet era, the procurator general and his regional and local equivalents are both the state's chief prosecuting officials and the chief investigators of criminal cases, a configuration that limits the pretrial rights of defendants.

== Opposition parties and the media ==
Also passed in the 2002 referendum was a plan to create a bicameral parliament. Several political parties have been formed with government approval but have yet to show interest in advocating alternatives to government policy. Similarly, although multiple media outlets (radio, TV, newspapers) have been established, these either remain under government control or rarely broach political topics. Independent political parties have been denied registration under restrictive registration procedures.

Despite extensive constitutional protections, the Karimov government has actively suppressed the activities of political movements, continues to ban unsanctioned public meetings and demonstrations, and continues to suppress opposition figures. The repression reduces constructive opposition even when institutional changes have been made. In the mid-1990s, legislation established significant rights for independent trade unions, separate from the government, and enhanced individual rights; but enforcement is uneven, and the role of the state security agencies, principally the State Security Service (SGB), remains central.

With the exception of sporadic liberalization, all opposition movements and independent media are essentially banned in Uzbekistan. The early 1990s were characterized by arrests and beatings of opposition figures on fabricated charges. For example, one prominent Uzbek, Ibrahim Bureyev, was arrested in 1994 after announcing plans to form a new opposition party.

After reportedly being freed just before the March referendum, Bureyev shortly thereafter was arrested again on charges of possessing illegal firearms and drugs. In April 1995, fewer than two weeks after the referendum extending President Karimov's term, six dissidents were sentenced to prison for distributing the party newspaper of Erk/Liberty and inciting the overthrow of Karimov. Members of opposition groups have been harassed by Uzbekistan's SNB as far away as Moscow.

== Crackdown on Islamic fundamentalism ==
The government severely represses those it suspects of Islamic extremism. Some 6,000 suspected members of Hizb ut-Tahrir are among those incarcerated, and some are believed to have died over the past several years from prison disease, torture, and abuse. With few options for religious instruction, some young Muslims have turned to underground Islamic movements. The police force and the SNB use torture as a routine investigation technique. The government has begun to bring to trial some officers accused of torture. Four police officers and three SNB officers have been convicted.

The government has granted amnesties to political and non-political prisoners, but this was believed to have benefited only a small proportion of those detained. In 2002 and the beginning of 2003 the government arrested fewer suspected Islamic fundamentalists than in the past. However, in May 2005, hundreds were killed by police in a massacre of protesters in the city of Andijan. This sparked the interest in online debate over the subject in different countries as it was not allowed to be discussed in the country. This led to the departure of other critics in fear of jail time or censorship.

In a move welcomed by the international community, the government of Uzbekistan has ended prior censorship, though the media remain tightly controlled.

In the modern era the government still detains and punishes the believers of Islam. According to the report of the U.S Department of State along with sources from Radio Free Europe written in 2023, Uzbekistan continues its offensive against people who teach or read certain books. This also counts for women who wear clothes that cover their eyes called burkas and also forced to shave their beard if its longer than a certain amount. During the month of Ramadan the country was found to punish fasting prisoners by threatening them to be put in worse conditions while at the same time not providing the morning meal for fasting.

== Executive branch ==
Main office-holders
| Office | Name | Party | Since |
|---|---|---|---|
| President | Shavkat Mirziyoyev | Uzbekistan Liberal Democratic Party | 8 September 2016 |
| Prime Minister | Abdulla Oripov | Uzbekistan Liberal Democratic Party | 14 December 2016 |

The president is elected by popular vote for a five-year term in elections that cannot be described as free. Freedom House rates Uzbekistan as absolutely unfree in both political institutions and civil society.

The prime minister and deputy ministers are appointed by the president. In effect, the executive branch holds almost all power. The judiciary lacks independence and the legislature, which meets only a few days each year, has little power to shape laws.

The president selects and replaces provincial governors. Under the terms of a December 1995 referendum, Islam Karimov's first term was extended. Another national referendum was held January 27, 2002, to again extend Karimov's term. The referendum passed and Karimov's term was extended by act of the parliament to December 2007. Most international observers refused to participate in the process and did not recognize the results, dismissing them as not meeting basic standards. Karimov had himself re-elected for a technically unconstitutional third term in the 2007 election.

== Legislative branch ==
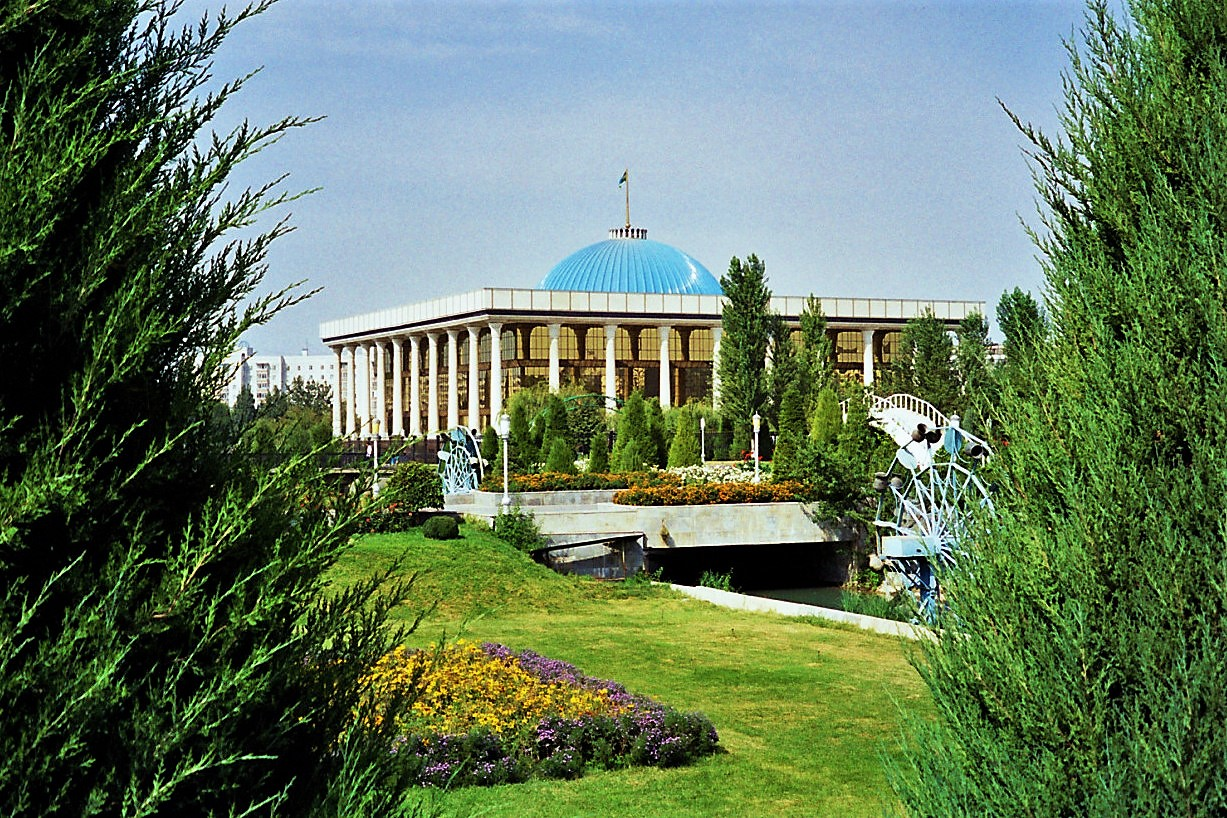
The Legislative Chamber of Uzbekistan (Lower House)

The Oliy Majlis has 150 members in the Legislative Chamber, elected for a five-year term, and 100 members in the Senate, 84 of whom are elected at the sessions of the district, regional and city deputies, and 16 appointed by the president.

== Administrative divisions ==
Uzbekistan is divided in 12 viloyatlar (singular - viloyat), 1 autonomous republic* (respublikasi), and 1 city** (shahri):

- Andijon Viloyati (Andijan)
- Buxoro Viloyati (Bukhara)
- Fargʻona Viloyati (Fergana)
- Jizzax Viloyati (Jizzakh)
- Xorazm Viloyati (Urganch)
- Namangan Viloyati (Namangan)
- Navoiy Viloyati (Navoi)
- Qashqadaryo Viloyati (Qarshi)
- Qaraqalpaqstan Respublikasi* (Nukus)
- Samarqand Viloyati (Samarkand)
- Sirdaryo Viloyati (Guliston)
- Surxondaryo Viloyati (Termiz)
- Toshkent Shahri** (Tashkent)
- Toshkent Viloyati

note: administrative divisions have the same names as their administrative centers (exceptions and alternate spellings have the administrative center name following in parentheses)

== Cabinet of Ministers ==
Aripov Government

- Deputy Prime Minister of the Republic of Uzbekistan – led by Ramatov Achilbay Jumaniyazovich and Khodjayev Jamshid Abdukhakimovich and Makhkamova Zulaykho Bakhriddinovna
- Ministry of Economy and Finance – led by Kuchkarov Djamshid Anvarovich
- Ministry of Water Resources – led by Khamrayev Shavkat Rakhimovich
- Ministry of Agriculture – Ibrokhim Yu. Abdurakhmonov
- Ministry of Labor and Social Protection of Population – led by Zohidov Botir Erkinovich and Makhkamova Zulaykho Bakhriddinovna
- Chairman of the Council of the Ministers of the Republic of Karakalpakstan – led by Ermanov Farkhod Urazbayevich
- Ministry of Higher and Secondary Special Education – led by Sharipov Kongratbay Avezimbetovich
- Ministry of Preschool and School Education – led by Umarova Hilola Uktamovna
- Ministry of Internal Affairs – led by Aziz Anvarovich Tashpulatov
- Ministry of Defense – led by Khalmukhamedov Shukhrat Gayratjonovich
- Ministry of Emergency Situations – led by Kudratkhodjaev Botir Bahromovich
- Ministry of Foreign Affairs – led by Saidov Baxtiyor Odilovich
- Ministry of Justice – led by Tashkulov Akbar Djurabayevich
- Ministry of Culture and Sports – Ikramov Adkham Ilkhamovich
- Ministry of Energy – led by Mirzamakhmudov Jurabek Tursunpulatovich
- Ministry of Health – led by Khudayarov Asilbek Anvarovich
- Ministry of Culture – led by Nazarbekov Ozodbek Akhmadovich
- Ministry of Digital Technologies – led by Shermatov Sherzod Xotamovich
- Ministry of Ecology – led by Abdukhakimov Aziz Abdukakharovich
- Ministry of Construction and Housing and Communal Services – Xidoyatov Sherzod Saidjanovich
- Ministry of Mining Industry and Geology – Islamov Bobir Farxadovich
- Ministry of Investment, Industry and Trade – Kudratov Laziz Shavkatovich

== International organization participation ==
Uzbekistan is a member of a number of international organizations, including AsDB, CIS, EAPC, EBRD, ECE, ECO, ESCAP, FAO, IAEA, IBRD, ICAO, ICRM, IDA, IFC, IFRCS, ILO, IMF, Interpol, IOC, ISO, ITU, NAM, OIC, OPCW, OSCE, PFP, SCO, UN, UNCTAD, UNESCO, UNIDO, UPU, WCO, WFTU, WHO, WIPO, WMO, UNWTO, and the WTO (observer).
