= President of Uzbekistan =

Head of state

President of the Republic of Uzbekistan
- Ўзбекистон Республикасининг Президенти
- Presidential Seal of Uzbekistan

- Presidential flag of Uzbekistan

- Incumbent; Shavkat Mirziyoyev since 8 September 2016
- Style: His Excellency (international correspondence); Mr President (informally); Supreme commander-in-chief (military)
- Status: Head of state Commander-in-chief
- Residence: Ok Saroy Presidential Palace (1991–2016); Kuksaroy Presidential Palace (since 2016)
- Seat: Tashkent
- Appointer: Popular vote
- Term length: Seven years, renewable once
- Constituting instrument: Constitution of Uzbekistan (1992)
- Inaugural holder: Islam Karimov
- Formation: 24 March 1990; 36 years ago (President of the Uzbek SSR); 1 September 1991; 35 years ago (President of Uzbekistan)
- Salary: 177,528,000 Uzbekistani sum/$15,600 USD annually
- Website: www.president.uz

The president of the Republic of Uzbekistan (Uzbek: Ўзбекистон Республикасининг Президенти, romanized: Oʻzbekiston Respublikasining Prezidenti) is the head of state and executive authority in Uzbekistan. The office of president was established in 1991, replacing the position of Chairperson of the Presidium of the Supreme Soviet of the Uzbek SSR, which had existed since 1925. The president is directly elected for a term of seven years by citizens of Uzbekistan who have reached the age of 18.

Islam Karimov was the only President of Uzbekistan for 25 years following the establishment of the office; he won three consecutive elections that many consider to have been rigged. The third election was the most controversial, since he had been elected twice and the current Constitution stipulated a maximum of two terms. The official explanation was that his first term in office, of five years, was under the previous Constitution and did not count towards the new limit. He died in office on 2 September 2016. A joint session of both houses of the Supreme Assembly of Uzbekistan appointed the Prime Minister, Shavkat Mirziyoyev, as interim president on 8 September 2016. In December 2016, Mirziyoyev was elected president in a popular vote, though international observers described the election as neither free nor fair, owing to restrictions on media reporting and ballot stuffing.

== Election ==
The Constitution of Uzbekistan requires that a presidential candidate be at least 35 years old, be fluent in the state language (Uzbek), and have resided in the territory of Uzbekistan for at least ten years.

Upon taking office, the president must take the following oath, stipulated by Article 92 of the constitution, at a sitting of the Supreme Assembly of Uzbekistan:

I do solemnly swear to faithfully serve the people of Uzbekistan, to strictly follow the Constitution and laws of the Republic, to guarantee the rights and freedoms of its citizens, and to conscientiously perform the duties vested in the President of the Republic of Uzbekistan.

The president places a hand on the Constitution of Uzbekistan and on the Quran when taking the oath of office.

The constitution states that the president shall be elected by citizens of the Republic of Uzbekistan on the basis of universal, equal, and direct suffrage by secret ballot.

== Role ==
The Constitution of Uzbekistan sets out the duties and powers of the President of the Republic. These include:

1. guaranteeing the observance of citizens' rights and freedoms, the Constitution, and the laws of the Republic of Uzbekistan;
2. taking the necessary measures to protect the sovereignty, security, and territorial integrity of the Republic of Uzbekistan, and to implement decisions regarding its national‑state structure;
3. representing the Republic of Uzbekistan within the country and in international relations;
4. conducting negotiations and signing treaties and agreements for the Republic, and ensuring the observance of the treaties and agreements negotiated by the Republic and the obligations it has assumed;
5. receiving letters of credence and recall from diplomatic and other representatives accredited to him or her;
6. presenting to the Senate of the Oliy Majlis (parliament) nominees for appointment as diplomatic and other representatives of the Republic of Uzbekistan to foreign states;
7. presenting to the Oliy Majlis annual reports on major matters of social and economic life, and on the domestic and foreign policies of the country;
8. forming and directing the executive authority; ensuring interaction between the supreme bodies of authority and administration of the Republic; forming and abolishing ministries, state committees, and other bodies of state administration, with subsequent submission of decrees on these matters for approval by the chambers of the Oliy Majlis;
9. presenting to the Senate a nominee for election as Chairperson of the Senate;
10. presenting to the chambers of the Oliy Majlis for consideration and approval a nominee for the office of Prime Minister, and relieving the Prime Minister of that post;
11. approving, on the nomination of the Prime Minister, members of the Cabinet of Ministers, and relieving them of their posts;
12. appointing a Procurator‑General and deputies, subject to approval by the Senate, and relieving them of their posts;
13. presenting to the Senate nominees for the posts of Chairperson and judges of the Constitutional Court, Chairperson and judges of the Supreme Court, Chairperson and judges of the Higher Economic Court, Chairperson of the Board of the Central Bank, and Chairperson of the State Committee for the Protection of Nature;
14. appointing judges of regional, inter‑district, district, city, military, and economic courts, and relieving them of their posts;
15. appointing and relieving khokims (governors) of regions and of the city of Tashkent of their posts, with subsequent approval by the relevant Kenghashes of People's Deputies. The President has the right to relieve, by his decision, khokims of districts and cities of their posts if they violate the Constitution or laws, or perform acts that bring discredit on the honour and dignity of a khokim;
16. suspending and repealing acts passed by bodies of state administration, as well as by khokims;
17. signing and promulgating laws; the President has the right to return a law, stating his objections, to the Oliy Majlis for a second debate and vote;
18. proclaiming a state of war in the event of an attack on the Republic of Uzbekistan, or arising from treaty obligations on mutual defence against aggression; and within 72 hours submitting such a decision for approval by the chambers of the Oliy Majlis;
19. in exceptional cases (real external threat, mass disturbances, major catastrophes, natural calamities, epidemics), in the interests of ensuring citizens' security, proclaiming a state of emergency in the entire territory or in particular localities, and within 72 hours submitting such a decision for approval by the chambers of the Oliy Majlis. The conditions and procedure for introducing a state of emergency are regulated by law;
20. serving as Supreme Commander‑in‑Chief of the Armed Forces, appointing and relieving the supreme command of the Armed Forces, and conferring the highest military ranks;
21. awarding orders, medals, and certificates of honour, and conferring qualification and honorary titles of the Republic of Uzbekistan;
22. ruling on matters of citizenship and the granting of political asylum;
23. proposing to the Senate any acts of amnesty and the effective pardoning of persons sentenced by the courts;
24. forming the National Security Service, and nominating and relieving the Chairperson of the National Security Service of his or her post, subject to the approval of decrees on these matters by the Senate;
25. exercising other powers stipulated by the Constitution and laws of the Republic.

== Presidential Administration ==
The Office of the President of the Republic of Uzbekistan (Uzbek: Oʻzbekiston Respublikasi Prezidenti devoni) is the informational, advisory, and organisational body of the presidency, which directly reports to the President of the Republic. The Presidential Administration is guided by the Constitution and laws of Uzbekistan, as well as by decrees, implementing resolutions, and orders of the officeholder.

=== Structure ===
- Head of the Presidential Administration of the Republic of Uzbekistan
  - First Deputy Head of the Presidential Administration
  - Deputy Head of the Presidential Administration
  - Presidential Spokesperson
- Presidential Advisor
- Presidential Advisor on Public Service and Cadastre
- Presidential Advisor on Legal Support and Coordination of Law Enforcement Affairs
- Deputy Presidential Advisor on Reforms, Legal Support, and Coordination of Law Enforcement Affairs
- Presidential Advisor on Citizens' Rights Protection, Claims Control, and Coordination
- Presidential Advisor on Youth, Science, Education, Health, and Sports
- Rector of the Academy of Public Administration under the President of Uzbekistan
- Head of the Department of Finance
- Presidential Advisor on Economic Sector Development, Investment, and Foreign Trade Policy
- Presidential Advisor on Economic Development, Investment, and Foreign Trade Policy

== Residence ==
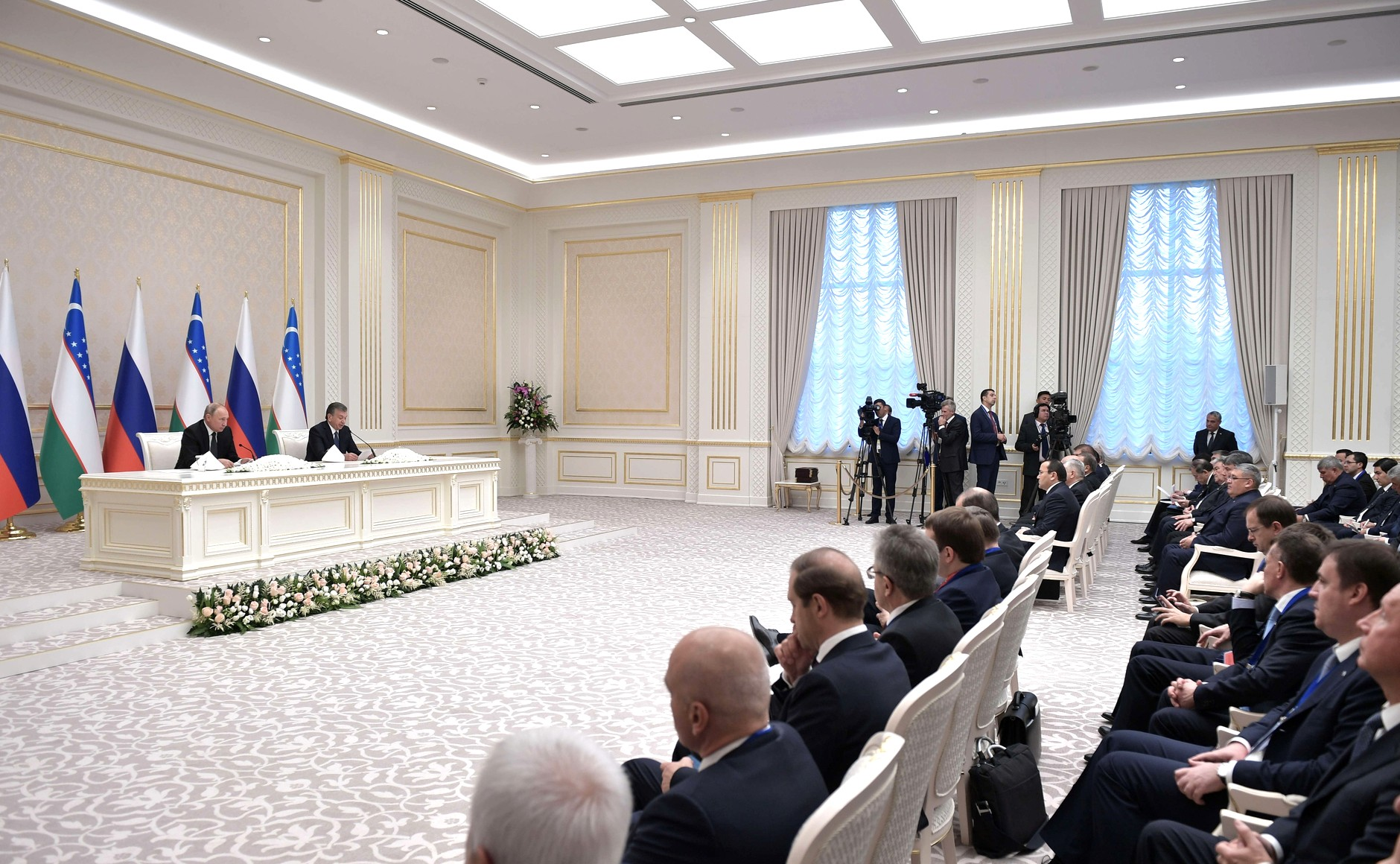
Modern joint-press conferences are usually held in the halls of Kuksaroy.

The official residence and workplace of the president of Uzbekistan is the Kuksaroy Presidential Palace in Tashkent, serving as the president's official residence since 2016. Prior to this, the Ok Saroy Presidential Palace was the official residence of President Islam Karimov. A residence that is also used is called Durmen, based in Tashkent's Qibray District. Since he came to power in December 2016, President Shavkat Mirziyoyev has used the district to a new residence for himself, which would include a presidential highway and a presidential compound with an interior that contains Argentinian blue marble slabs and Swarovski crystals.

== Presidential Security and Transport ==
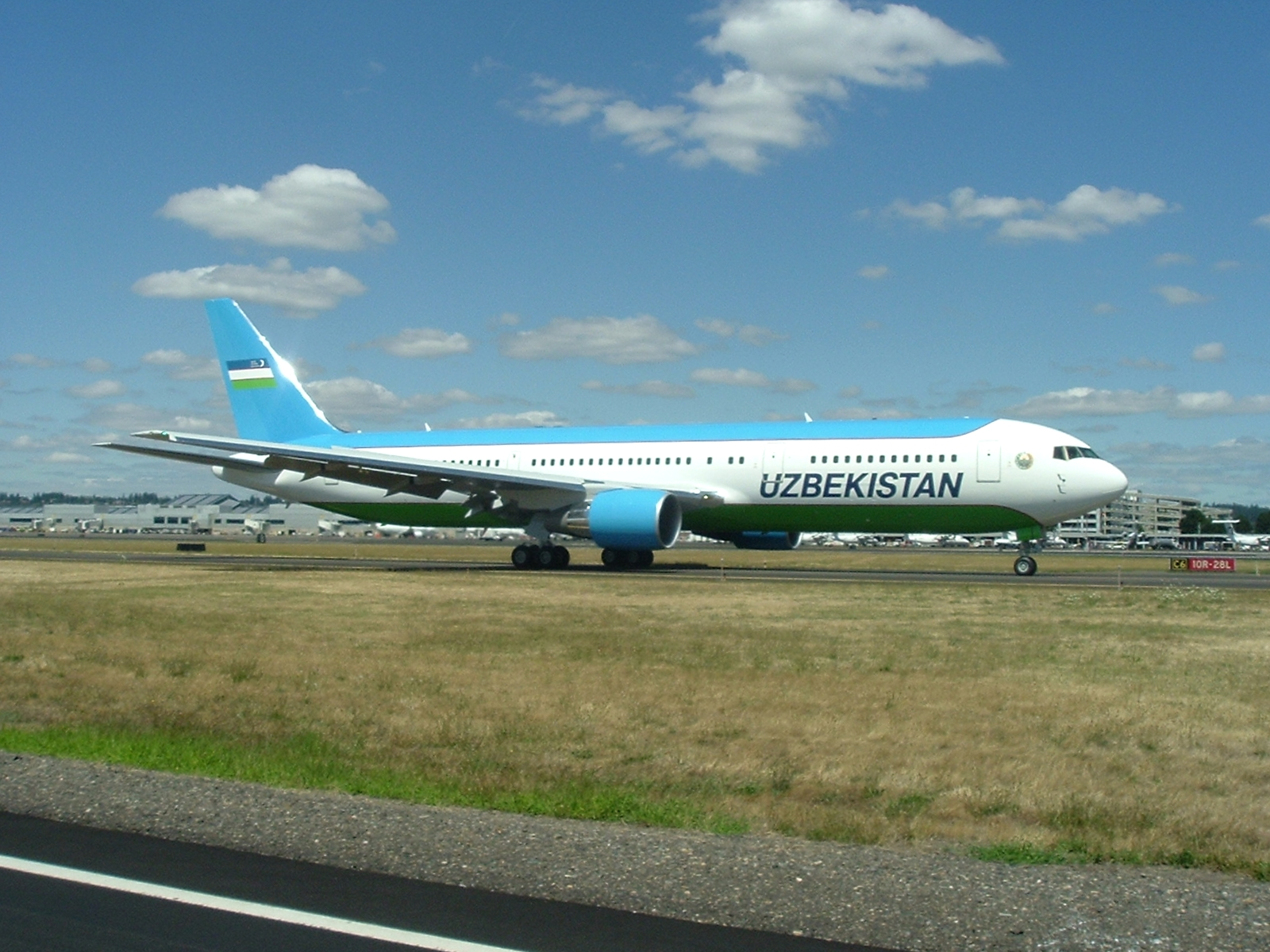
A Boeing 767-300

The Uzbek government operates a Boeing 767-300 and an Airbus A320-200 for use during state visits to other countries and travel by air to other parts of the country. These jets, which are provided by Uzbekistan Airways, have Uzbekistan's flag on the vertical stabilizers instead of the company's logo, symbolizing the status of the jet as a presidential plane. When it comes to transport by land, the president always employs as special Mercedes-Benz S-Class car which is used to transport the president throughout the city of Tashkent as well as take him/her to their residence at the end of the work day. The National Guard of Uzbekistan and the State Security Service are primarily responsible for the president's security when he/she is travelling. Kuksaroy is always protected by members of the armed forces and the SNB at all times.

== List of presidents of Uzbekistan ==
Political parties

Communist Party of Uzbekistan (OʻzKP)
People's Democratic Party of Uzbekistan (XDP)
Uzbekistan Liberal Democratic Party (OʻzLiDeP)
Uzbekistan National Revival Democratic Party (OʻzMTDP)

Status

Denotes acting president

Symbols

^{T} Term extension referendum

^{C} Constitutional referendum

^{†} Died in office

No.	Portrait	Name (Birth–Death)	Elected	Term of office			Political party
No.	Portrait	Name (Birth–Death)	Elected	Took office	Left office	Time in office	Political party
		Islam Karimov (1938–2016)	1990	24 March 1990	2 September 2016^{[†]}	26 years, 162 days	OʻzKP (until 3 November 1991)
1		Islam Karimov (1938–2016)	1991; 1995^{[T]} 2000; 2002^{[C]}	24 March 1990	2 September 2016^{[†]}	26 years, 162 days	XDP (until 22 January 2007)
		Islam Karimov (1938–2016)	2007; 2015	24 March 1990	2 September 2016^{[†]}	26 years, 162 days	OʻzLiDeP
—		Nigmatilla Yuldashev (1962–); Acting president	—	2 September 2016	8 September 2016	6 days	OʻzMTDP
—		Shavkat Mirziyoyev (1957–)	—	8 September 2016	14 December 2016	97 days	OʻzMTDP (until 14 December 2016)
2		Shavkat Mirziyoyev (1957–)	2016; 2021	14 December 2016	Incumbent	9 years, 308 days	OʻzLiDeP (until 9 July 2023)
		Shavkat Mirziyoyev (1957–)	2023	14 December 2016	Incumbent	9 years, 308 days	Independent

== Latest election ==
Uzbekistan’s President Shavkat Mirziyoyev was re-elected with 88% of the vote. The preliminary results of the presidential elections were announced at a briefing by the chairman of the Central Election Commission of Uzbekistan, Zainiddin Nizamkhojaev. More than 15 million voters participated in elections.

Candidate	Party	Votes	%
Shavkat Mirziyoyev	Independent	13,625,055	87.71
Robaxon Maxmudova	Justice Social Democratic Party	693,634	4.47
Ulugbek Inoyatov	People's Democratic Party	629,116	4.05
Abdushukur Xamzayev	Ecological Party of Uzbekistan	585,711	3.77
Total		15,533,516	100.00
Valid votes		15,533,516	99.25
Invalid/blank votes		117,889	0.75
Total votes		15,651,405	100.00
Registered voters/turnout		19,593,838	79.88
Source: CEC

== See also ==
- List of leaders of Uzbekistan
- Vice President of Uzbekistan
- Prime Minister of Uzbekistan
- Politics of Uzbekistan
