= Azamat Ziyo =

State and public figure

- Azamat Ziyo Hamid oʻgʻli
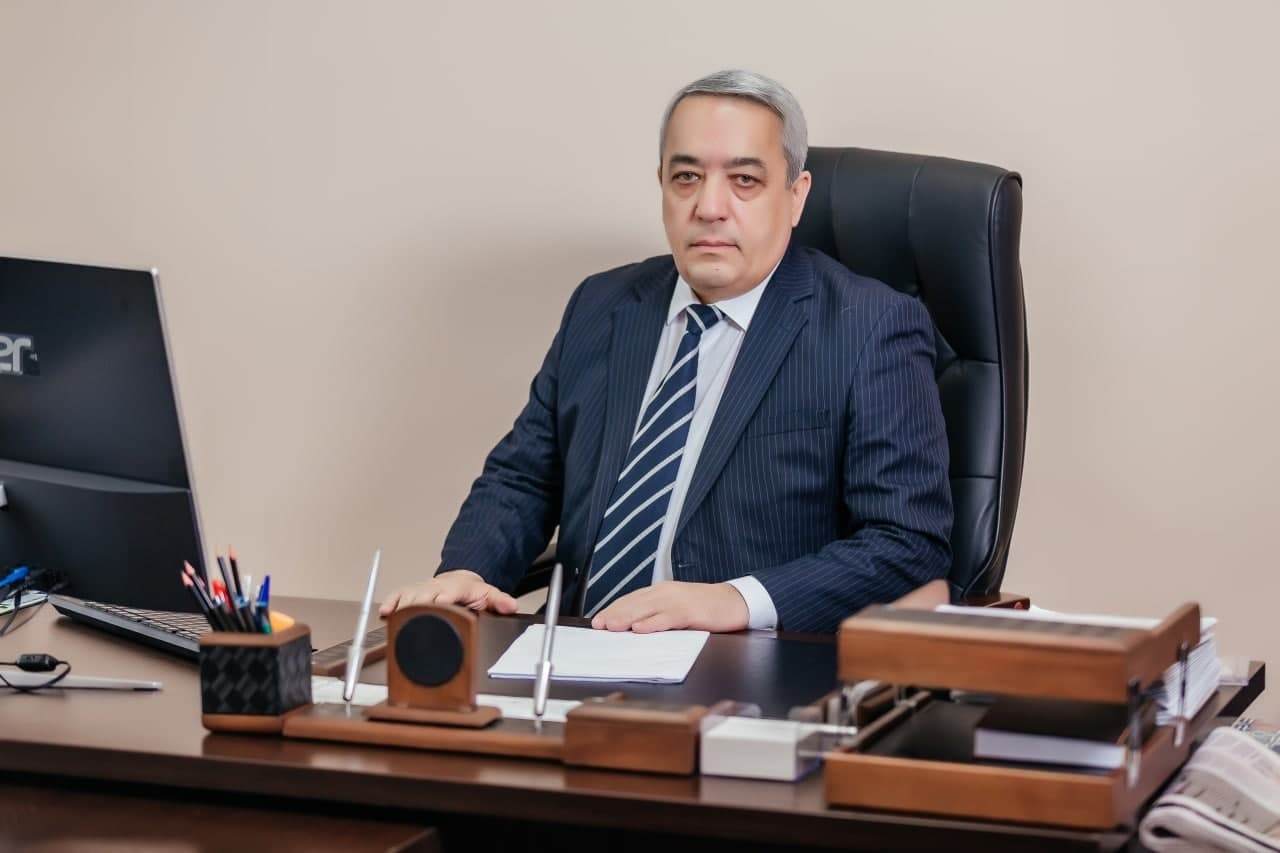
- Born: June 23, 1960
- Citizenship: Uzbek SSR; Uzbekistan
- Awards: Shuhrat medal Friendship order

Azamat Ziyo (full name in uzbek: Azamat Ziyo Hamid oʻgʻli; born June 23, 1963, Tashkent, Uzbek SSR) is a state and public figure, academician. He was the former press secretary of the first president of Uzbekistan, Islam Karimov. He is a member of the "National Revival" party. He is the chief editor of the “Oʻzbekiston tarixi” journal. He was born on June 23, 1963, in Tashkent, in the family of a famous Uzbek historian and scholar Hamid Ziyoyev (1923—2015).

== Early activities ==
Azamat Ziyo graduated from the Faculty of Oriental Languages, Iranian Department of Tashkent State University (now National University of Uzbekistan) in 1985. From 1985 to 1997, he worked as a senior laboratory assistant, junior researcher, researcher, and senior researcher at the Institute of Oriental Studies of the Academy of Sciences of Uzbekistan.

== Scientific activity ==
He has been a candidate of historical sciences since 1990 (dissertation topic: “Silsilat as-salotin as a historical source”), and a doctor of historical sciences since 1999 (dissertation topic: “From the history of Uzbek statehood” (from the ancient period to the Russian invasion). He was awarded the academic title of professor in 2007. Azamat Ziyo was the first in history to prove based on primary sources that Uzbek statehood has a 2,700-year history. In 2023, he was elected an Academician of the Academy of Sciences of Uzbekistan Academy od Sciences.

== Positions ==
From 1997 to 2000, he was the chief consultant of the analytical group of the Information Center of the President of Uzbekistan, the press secretary of the President of Uzbekistan, and the state adviser to the President of Uzbekistan on social and political issues. In 2019, he was appointed as the director of the Institute of History of the Academy of Sciences.

== Political activity ==
Azamat Ziyo's nearly twenty-year activity took place in the Uzbek parliament: from 2000 to 2005, he was the chairman of the Youth Affairs Committee of the Oliy Majlis, from 2005 to 2010, he was the chairman of the Committee on Science, Education, Culture and Sports of the Legislative Chamber of the Oliy Majlis, from 2010 to 2019, he was a member of the Committee on Science, Education, Culture and Sports of the Legislative Chamber of the Oliy Majlis.

He has been a deputy of the Oliy Majlis since 1998, a deputy of the Legislative Chamber of the Oliy Majlis since 2005, a member of the Tashkent City Council of People's Deputies since 2020, and a member of the Senate of the Oliy Majlis.

== Orders and medals ==
1. Shuhrat medal (1996)
2. Friendship order (2003)

== Works and scientific papers ==
1. Oʻzbek davlatchilik tarixi (History of Uzbek statehood). Tashkent, 2000.
2. Oʻzbek ayollari tarix sahnasida (Uzbek women in the historical scene). Tashkent, 2002.
3. Amir Temur xorijda (Amir Temur abroad). T, 1996.
4. Amir Temur va Tugʻluq Temur (Amir Temur and Tugluq Temur). T, 1996.
5. Oʻzbekistonda Firdavsiy hayoti va ijodini oʻrganishga doir (On the study of Firdavsiy's life and work in Uzbekistan). T, 1987.
6. Temur tugʻilgan joy va masalasiga doir (On the birthplace and issue of Temur). T, 1994.
7. Temuriylar davri Hindiston tarixnavisligi (Indian historiography of the Temurids period). T, 1996.
