= 2019–20 Uzbek parliamentary election =

← 2014–15	22 December 2019 (first round); 5 January 2020 (second round)	2024 →
- All 150 seats in the Legislative Chamber; 76 seats needed for a majority
- Turnout: 74.28% (first round); 62.84% (second round)
Party	Leader	Seats	+/–
OʻzLiDeP	Aktam Haitov	53	+1
Milliy Tiklanish	Alisher Qodirov	36	0
ASDP	Narimon Umarov	24	+4
XDP	Ulugʻbek Inoyatov	22	−5
Ecological	Boriy Alixonov	15	0
This lists parties that won seats. See the complete results below.
Results by district
Speaker before	Speaker after
Nurdinjon Ismoilov; XDP	Nurdinjon Ismoilov; XDP

Parliamentary elections were held in Uzbekistan on 22 December 2019, with a second round in 25 of the 150 constituencies on 5 January 2020. They were the first elections to be held after the death of Islam Karimov in 2016. The ruling Uzbekistan Liberal Democratic Party remained the largest party in the Legislative Chamber, winning 53 of the 150 seats. All five parties contesting the elections were regarded as loyal to President Shavkat Mirziyoyev.

== Electoral system ==
The 150 members of the Legislative Chamber were elected from single member constituencies using the two-round system. A second round was also held in constituencies where voter turnout was less than 33%.

With the adoption of a new electoral code in June 2019, this was the first election in which all seats in the Legislative Chamber were directly elected; previously fifteen seats had been reserved for the Ecological Movement. Other reforms included a new requirement that all candidates be nominated by a political party, and a minimum quota of 30% of female candidates for each party.

== Campaign ==
A total of 750 candidates contested the 150 seats, representing five parties viewed as loyal to the president. An official debate between party leaders was held for the first time. Opposition parties were banned, including the Erk Democratic Party, whose leader Muhammad Salih remained in exile. However, after the first round of voting, President Mirziyoyev and the Chairman of the Central Election Commission made rare public acknowledgements of the existence of opposition parties, and raised the possibility that they would be allowed to participate in future elections. These statements were made amidst an outbreak of protests over shortages and high prices during the campaign period, and the increased use of social media to discuss politics in the country.

In the second round, the 50 candidates contesting the 25 remaining seats included 15 from the Uzbekistan Liberal Democratic Party, 11 from the Uzbekistan National Revival Democratic Party, 10 from the Justice Social Democratic Party, 9 from the People's Democratic Party of Uzbekistan and five from the Ecological Party.

== Results ==
Party	First round			Second round			Total seats	+/–
Party	Votes	%	Seats	Votes	%	Seats	Total seats	+/–
Uzbekistan Liberal Democratic Party			42			11	53	+1
Uzbekistan National Revival Democratic Party			34			2	36	0
Justice Social Democratic Party			20			4	24	+4
People's Democratic Party of Uzbekistan			18			4	22	–5
Ecological Party of Uzbekistan			11			4	15	0
Total			125			25	150	0
Total votes	13,963,627	–		1,978,048	–			
Registered voters/turnout	18,797,810	74.28		3,147,921	62.84			
Source: CEC, CEC, CEC
