= Aktam Haitov =

Uzbek politician

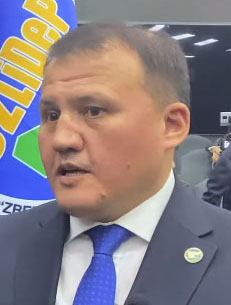
- Haitov in 2019

Member of Legislative Chamber
- Incumbent
- Assumed office 25 December 2019

Leader of OʻzLiDeP
- Incumbent
- Assumed office 3 August 2018
- Preceded by: Baxtiyor Yoqubov

Personal details
- Born: 12 March 1974 (age 52) Kitob District, Uzbek SSR, Soviet Union
- Occupation: Politician
- Website: https://t.me/a_xaitov

Aktam Ahmadovich Haitov (born12 March 1974) is an Uzbek politician who is currently serving as a member of the Legislative Chamber since 25 December 2019. He has also been a leader of the Oʻzlidep since 3 August 2018.

== Biography ==
Haitov obtained his degree in Economics and Management from the Samarkand Institute of Economics in 1994. From 1994 to 2000, he worked at the Samarkand Institute of Economics and Service, as well as in the Samarkand administration department. He worked in the Informational and Analytical Department of the Cabinet of Ministers from 2000 and became department head in 2002. From 2002 to 2005 he was a Deputy Chairman of the Committee for Economically Insolvent Enterprises.

From 2005 to 2006, he worked as the First Deputy Chairman of the State Committee of Uzbekistan on demonopolization, support of competition and entrepreneurship, the head of the consolidated information and analytical department on economics and foreign economic relations of the Cabinet of Ministers of the Republic of Uzbekistan, and the first deputy minister of labor and social protection of the population of the Uzbekistan.

From 2006 to 2014, Haitov worked as Acting Minister, then Minister of Labor and Social Protection of the Population of Uzbekistan. From 2014 to 2016, he was Deputy Chairman of the Board of Biokimyo JSC, in 2016–2017, Director General of the Uzbek Agency for Standardization, Metrology and Certification, and in 2017–2018, Minister of Employment and Labor Relations of the Republic of Uzbekistan.

On 3 August 2018, at the 10th Meeting of the Political Council of the Liberal Democratic Party of Uzbekistan, Haitov was elected the leader (chairman of the executive committee of the political council) of the party. He is also the chairman of the Council of the Council of farmers, dekhkan farms and owners of household lands in Uzbekistan. Haitov was elected to the Legislative Chamber in the 2019–20 parliamentary election.
