= Justice Social Democratic Party =

Political party in Uzbekistan

"Justice" Social Democratic Party "Adolat" sotsial-demokratik partiyasi
- Abbreviation: ASDP
- Leader: Robakhon Makhmudova
- Founders: Anvar Juraboev; Shukrullo Mirsaidov
- Founded: 18 February 1995; 30 years ago
- Headquarters: Tashkent
- Newspaper: Adolat
- Youth wing: USDP "Adolat" Youth Wing
- Ideology: Social democracy Labourism
- Political position: Centre-left
- Colours: Red
- Slogan: Kuch adolatdadir ('Strength in Justice')
- Legislative Chamber: 21 / 150

Website
- adolat.uz

Old version of the party logo

Adolat (lit. 'Justice'), officially the "Adolat" Social Democratic Party (Uzbek: "Adolat" sotsial-demokratik partiyasi, "Adolat" SDP), is a political party in Uzbekistan. One of the founders and the first general secretary of the party was Anvar Juraboev. It is one of the four parties who acts as a pro-government opposition to the Uzbekistan Liberal Democratic Party, the country's ruling party.

== Ideology ==
ASDP is a centre-left political party and holds positions similar to the People's Democratic Party of Uzbekistan. It promotes egalitarianism and social justice, supporting a social market economy and an universalistic welfare state. Its core supporters include workers in technical engineering, teachers, doctors, and employees in budgetary organizations and the sector of services.

== Electoral history ==
=== Presidential elections ===
| Election | Party candidate | Votes | % | Votes | % | Result |
| Election | Party candidate | First round | | Second round | | Result |
|---|---|---|---|---|---|---|
| 2007 | Dilorom Toshmuhamedova | 434,111 | 3.03 | — | — | Lost ✗ |
| 2015 | Narimov Umarov | 389,024 | 2.09 | — | — | Lost ✗ |
| 2016 | Narimov Umarov | 619,972 | 3.52 | — | — | Lost ✗ |
| 2021 | Bahrom Abduhalimov | 549,766 | 3.40 | — | — | Lost ✗ |
| 2023 | Robaxon Maxmudova | 693,634 | 4.47 | — | — | Lost ✗ |

=== Legislative Chamber elections ===
| Election | Seats | +/– | Position |
|---|---|---|---|
| 1999 | 11 / 250 | New | ▲4th |
| 2004–05 | 10 / 120 | ▼1 | ▼5th |
| 2009–10 | 19 / 135 | ▲9 | ▲4th |
| 2014–15 | 20 / 150 | ▲1 | 4th |
| 2019–20 | 24 / 150 | ▲4 | ▲3rd |
| 2024 | 20 / 150 | ▼4 | 3rd |

== Sources ==
- Abdurasulov, Abdujalil (20 December 2019). "Questions over Uzbekistan's new era of 'openness'". BBC News.
- Dawisha, Karen; Parrott, Bruce (1997). Conflict, Cleavage, and Change in Central Asia and the Caucasus. Cambridge University Press. ISBN 9780521597319 – via Google Books.
- "World News: Election Watch – Uzbekistan". CNN. 2004. Archived from the original on 6 April 2005.
- "What ideas do political parties advance?". Uzbekistan Today. 15 November 2016 – via The Permanent Mission of the Republic of Uzbekistan to the United Nations.
