= Majority government =

Absolute majority of seats in a legislature

A majority government is a government by one or more governing parties that hold an absolute majority of seats in a legislature. Such a government can consist of one party that holds a majority on its own, or be a coalition government of multiple parties. This is as opposed to a minority government, where the government does not have a majority, and needs to cooperate with opposition parties to get legislation passed. A government majority determines the balance of power. A government is not a majority government if it only has a majority when counting parties outside the government that have a confidence agreement with it.

A majority government is usually assured of having its legislation passed and rarely if ever, has to fear being defeated in parliament, a state also known as a working majority. In contrast, a minority government must constantly bargain for support from other parties in order to pass legislation and avoid being defeated on motions of no confidence. Single-party majority governments tend to be formed in the aftermath of strong election performances.

The term "majority government" may also be used for a stable long-term coalition of two or more parties to form an absolute majority. One example of such an electoral coalition is in Australia, where the Liberal and National parties have run as an electoral bloc, known simply as the Coalition, for decades. The largest majority government in Australia was elected in 1975, when the Coalition won 71.65% of the seats, 91 out of 127, in a landslide victory. Majority governments with a larger absolute number of seats have been elected since, with the Coalition and Labor each winning 94 seats in 1996 and 2025 respectively. This however amounted to a smaller majority and seat share due to the House of Representatives being considerably larger than in 1975.

In electoral systems where one party usually wins a majority of seats on their own, such as first past the post, coalitions are rare, but may happen when an election returns a hung parliament. An example of this was the 2010–2015 coalition government in the United Kingdom, which was composed of the Conservative Party and the Liberal Democrats. The Conservatives won the most seats of any single party in the 2010 election, but fell short of an absolute majority. However, by combining with the Liberal Democrats a solid majority in the House of Commons was created. This was the first true coalition government in the UK since World War II.

Majority government differs from consensus government or national unity government in not requiring a consensus or supermajority.

== See also ==
- Coalition government
- Hung parliament
- Minority government
