= Diloram Tashmukhamedova =

Uzbek politician (born 1962)

- Дилором Тошмуҳамедова
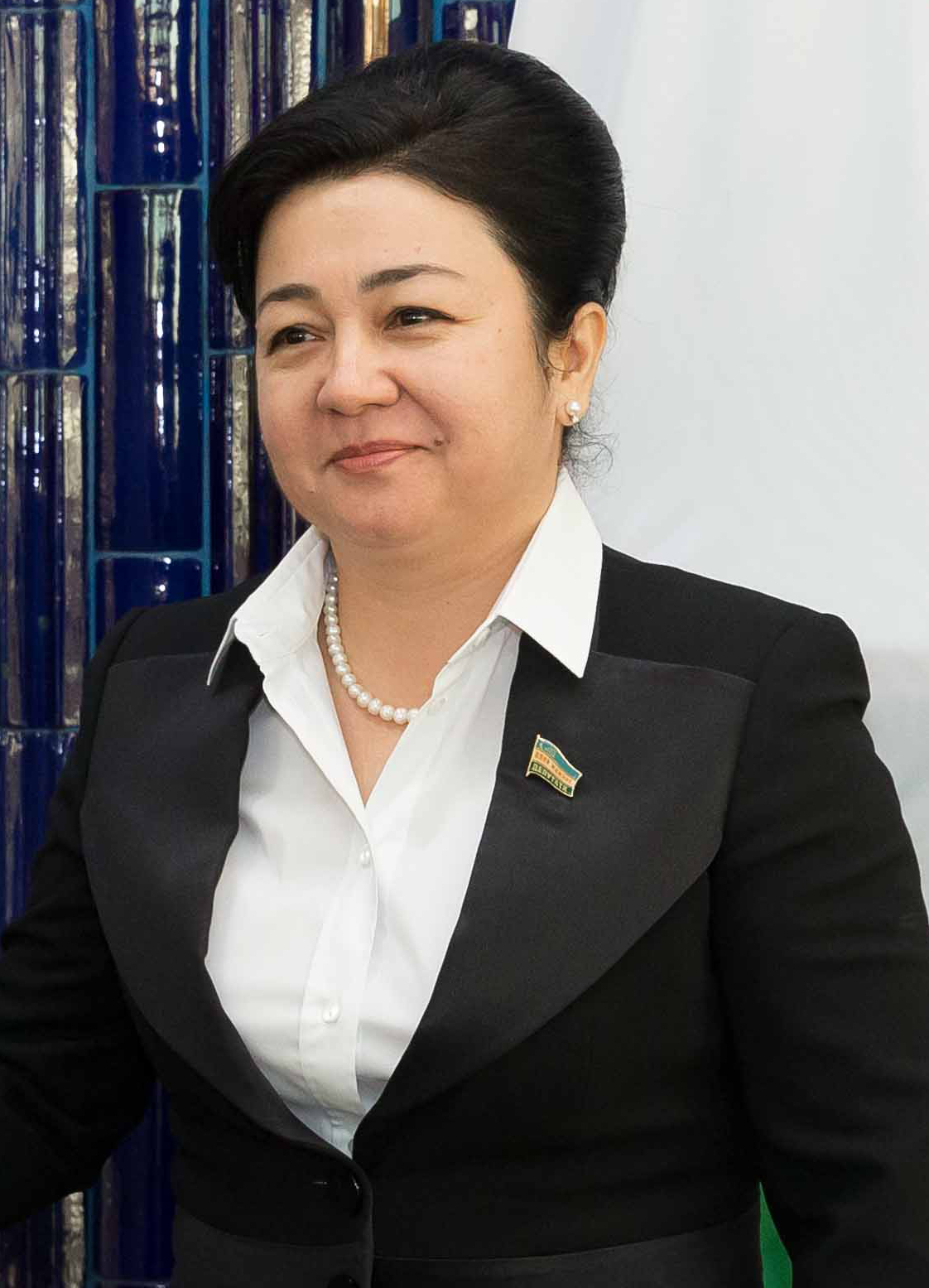
- Tashmukhamedova in 2013

Speaker of the Legislative Chamber of Uzbekistan
- In office 23 January 2008 – 23 January 2015
- Preceded by: Erkin Khalilov
- Succeeded by: Nuriddinjon Ismailov

Personal details
- Born: 19 February 1962 (age 64) Tashkent, Uzbek SSR, Soviet Union (now Uzbekistan)
- Party: Adolat

Diloram Gafurjanovna Tashmukhamedova (Uzbek: Dilorom Gʻofurjonovna Toshmuhamedova; born 19 December 1962) is an Uzbek politician.

== Biography ==
Tashmukhamedova was born in Tashkent into a family of workers; she is an ethnic Uzbek. After graduation from secondary school in 1978, she attended Taskhent State Medical Institute, from which she graduated in 1984. She continued in employment there for over ten years, defending her thesis in 1993 to receive a degree in medical science. Later she worked in private enterprise. In 2003 she received a degree from the economic faculty of the Academy of State and Public Construction. Tashmukhamedova was first elected to the Oliy Majlis in 2001, while that body was still unicameral. In 2004 she was elected to the Legislative Chamber of Uzbekistan, where she served as a member of the Committee on International Affairs and Interparliamentary Relations. In 2005 she was elected first secretary of the Justice Social Democratic Party, serving as head of its parliamentary faction. In July 2007 she was elected the chamber's deputy speaker. The party nominated her to run against Islam Karimov in the presidential election of 2007, in which she garnered just under 3% of the vote. she was the first woman to stand for president in an Uzbekistani election. She was elected Speaker of the Legislative Assembly on January 23, 2008, serving until being replaced by Nuriddinjon Ismailov on January 12, 2015. In 2018, she was appointed director of the Oila Scientific and Practical Research Center. Tashmukhamedova has written a number of articles on subjects related to medicine, politics, and women's rights. In 2006 she was awarded the Order of Friendship.

== Family ==
She is married to a businessman, R. Tashmuhamedov, with whom she has four children.
