= 1990 Uzbek presidential election =

1990 Presidential election in the Uzbekistan SSR
- 24 March 1990
- Turnout: 99.6%
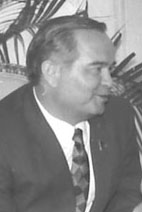
Nominee	Islam Karimov
Party	OKP
Electoral vote	491
Percentage	98.20%
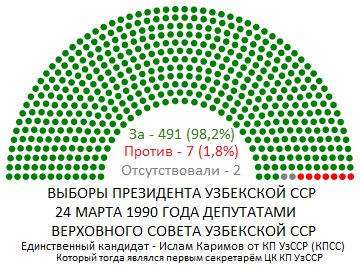
Elected President
Islam Karimov
CP UzSSR

The first and last presidential elections in the history of the Uzbekistan Soviet Socialist Republic were held on March 24, 1990, one month after the elections to the Supreme Soviet of the Uzbekistan SSR.

The Uzbekistan SSR was the first of the Soviet Union republics to establish the office of President and Vice President of Uzbekistan. The only candidate in the election was the then acting First Secretary of the Central Committee of the Communist party of the Uzbekistan SSR (as part of the CPSU), the de facto leader of the Republic since June 23 1989 — Islam Abdughaniyevich Karimov. Thus, the first and last presidential elections in the history of the Uzbekistan SSR were held on an uncontested basis. The president of the Republic was elected by newly elected deputies of the Supreme Soviet of the Uzbekistan SSR of the 12th (last) convocation. Shukrulla Mirsaidov was elected Vice-President of the Republic.

Uzbekistan SSR on the map of the USSR

== Results ==
498 out of 500 deputies of the Supreme Soviet of the Uzbekistan SSR took part in the voting. Of these, 491 deputies (98.2%) supported the candidacy of Islam Karimov, and 7 deputies (1.8%) voted against. Two deputies were absent. Thus, Islam Karimov was elected president of the Uzbekistan SSR with an overwhelming number of votes, and on the same day began his new duties, continuing in parallel to hold the post of first secretary of the Central Committee of the Communist Party of the Uzbekistan SSR.

Candidate	Party	Votes	%
Islam Karimov	OʻzKP	491	98.2
Against		7	1.8
Invalid/blank votes		-	-
Total		498	100
Registered voters/turnout		500	99.6
