= 2024 Uzbek parliamentary election =

← 2019–20	27 October 2024	2029 →
- All 150 seats in the Legislative Chamber; 76 seats needed for a majority
Party	Leader	Vote %	Seats	+/–
OʻzLiDeP	Abdulla Aripov	34.75	64	+11
Milliy Tiklanish	Alisher Qodirov	18.82	29	−7
XDP	Ulugbek Inoyatov	17.11	20	−2
ASDP	Robaxon Mahmudova	16.20	21	−3
Ecological	Narzullo Oblomurodov	13.12	16	+1
This lists parties that won seats. See the complete results below.
Speaker before	Speaker after
Nuriddinjon Ismailov; XDP	Nuriddinjon Ismailov; XDP

Parliamentary elections were held on Uzbekistan on 27 October 2024 to elect members of the Legislative Chamber.

== Electoral system ==
The 150 members of the Legislative Chamber are elected via parallel voting: half are elected in single-member constituencies via first-past-the-post voting, while the other half are elected via closed list proportional representation in a single nationwide constituency with an electoral threshold of 7% using the Hare quota. If less than one-third of eligible voters participate in an election, it will be considered invalid, and if no party crosses the electoral threshold for proportional seats, the elections for the proportional seats will be considered invalid. At least 40% of candidates must be women.

== Results ==
Turnout surpassed the 33% threshold needed for the election to be valid. All candidates came from the country's five registered political parties, none of which are in opposition to the government of President Shavkat Mirziyoyev.

Results of the election showed 64 deputies for the Movement of Entrepreneurs and Businessmen – Uzbekistan Liberal Democratic Party, 29 from the Democratic Party of Uzbekistan, 20 from the People's Democratic Party of Uzbekistan, 21 from the Social Democratic Party, and 16 from the Ecological Party of Uzbekistan.

Party	Proportional			Constituency			Total seats	+/–
Party	Votes	%	Seats	Votes	%	Seats	Total seats	+/–
Liberal Democratic Party	5,194,041	34.75	26			38	64	+11
Milliy Tiklanish	2,812,493	18.82	14			15	29	−7
People's Democratic Party	2,558,016	17.11	13			7	20	−2
Adolat SDP	2,420,857	16.20	12			9	21	−3
Ecological Party	1,960,764	13.12	10			6	16	+1
Total	14,946,171	100.00	75			75	150	0
Valid votes	14,946,171	99.46						
Invalid/blank votes	81,358	0.54						
Total votes	15,027,529	100.00						
Registered voters/turnout	19,944,859	75.35						
Source: MSK, MSK

== Aftermath ==
The Organization for Security and Co-operation in Europe criticized the election for the lack of "a genuine choice" for voters, since all parliamentary parties are loyal to the President and opposition is suppressed. However, the organization also praised the reforms to the voting system that reserved more seats for women.
