= Oliy Majlis =

Parliament of Uzbekistan

Coordinates: 41°18′52″N 69°15′55″E

Oliy Majlis of the Republic of Uzbekistan Oʻzbekiston Respublikasi Oliy Majlisi (Uzbek)
- 5th Oliy Majlis

Type
- Type: Bicameral
- Houses: Upper: Senate; Lower: Legislative Chamber

History
- Founded: 25 December 1994
- Preceded by: Unicameral Supreme Council of the Republic of Uzbekistan

Leadership
- Chairman of the Senate: Tanzila Norbaeva since 21 June 2019
- Speaker of the Legislative Chamber: Nuriddinjon Ismailov, PDPU since 12 January 2015

Structure
- Seats: Total 250 members; 100 senators in the Senate; 150 deputies in the Legislative Chamber
- Senate political groups: Independent (100)
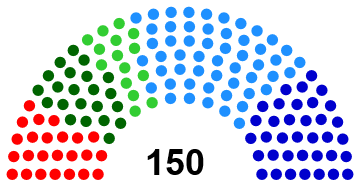
- Legislative Chamber political groups: Government coalition (93); UzLiDeP (64); Milliy Tiklanish (29); Others (57); Adolat (21); People's Democratic Party (20); Ecological Party (16)

Elections
- Senate voting system: 84 chosen by deputies of regional assembly and 16 appointed by the President of Uzbekistan
- Legislative Chamber voting system: Parallel voting: Closed list proportional representation (75 seats); First-past-the-post voting (75 seats)
- First Legislative Chamber election: 25 December 1994, 8 January and 22 January 1995
- Last Legislative Chamber election: 27 October 2024
- Next Legislative Chamber election: October 2029

Meeting place
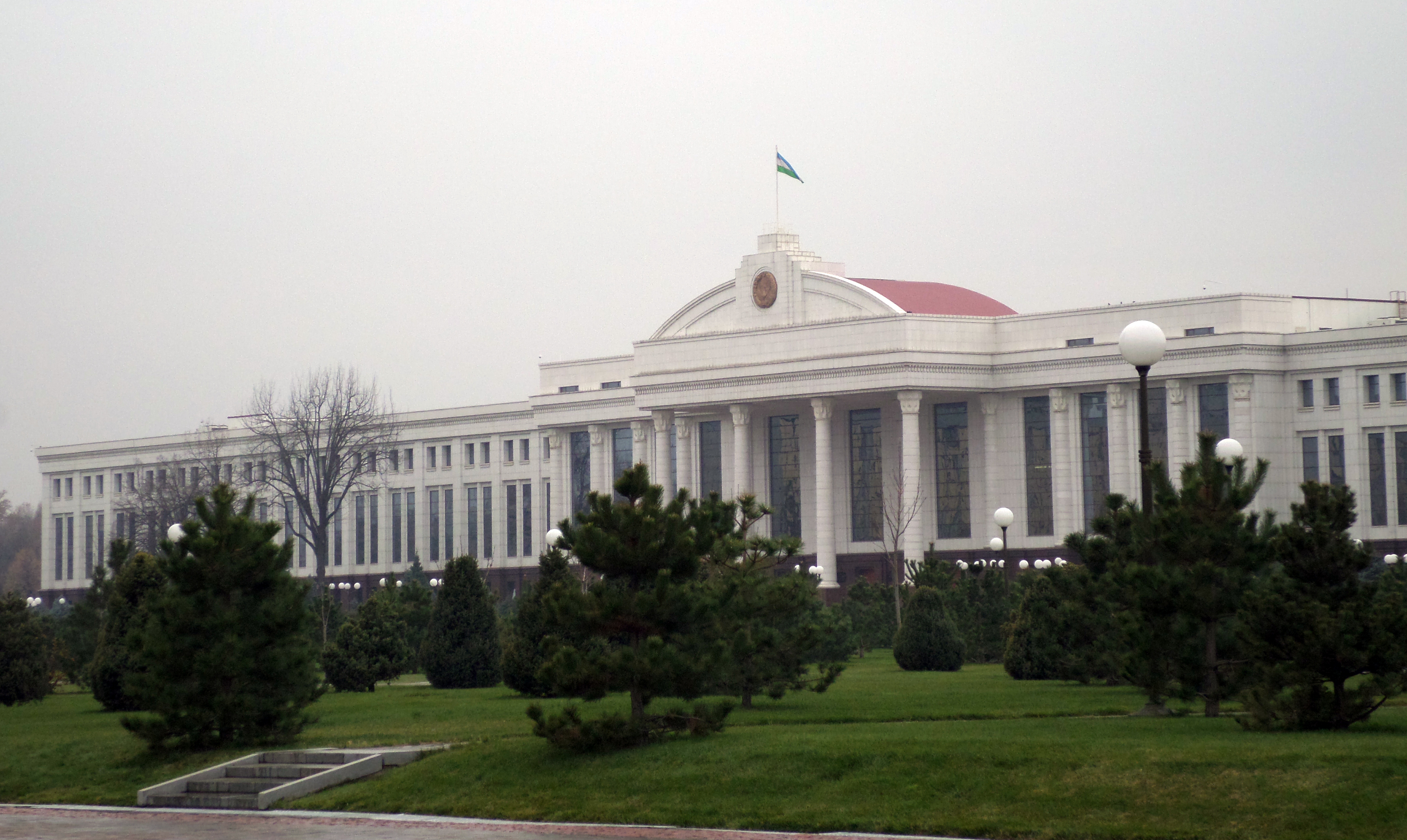
- Senate Building in Tashkent
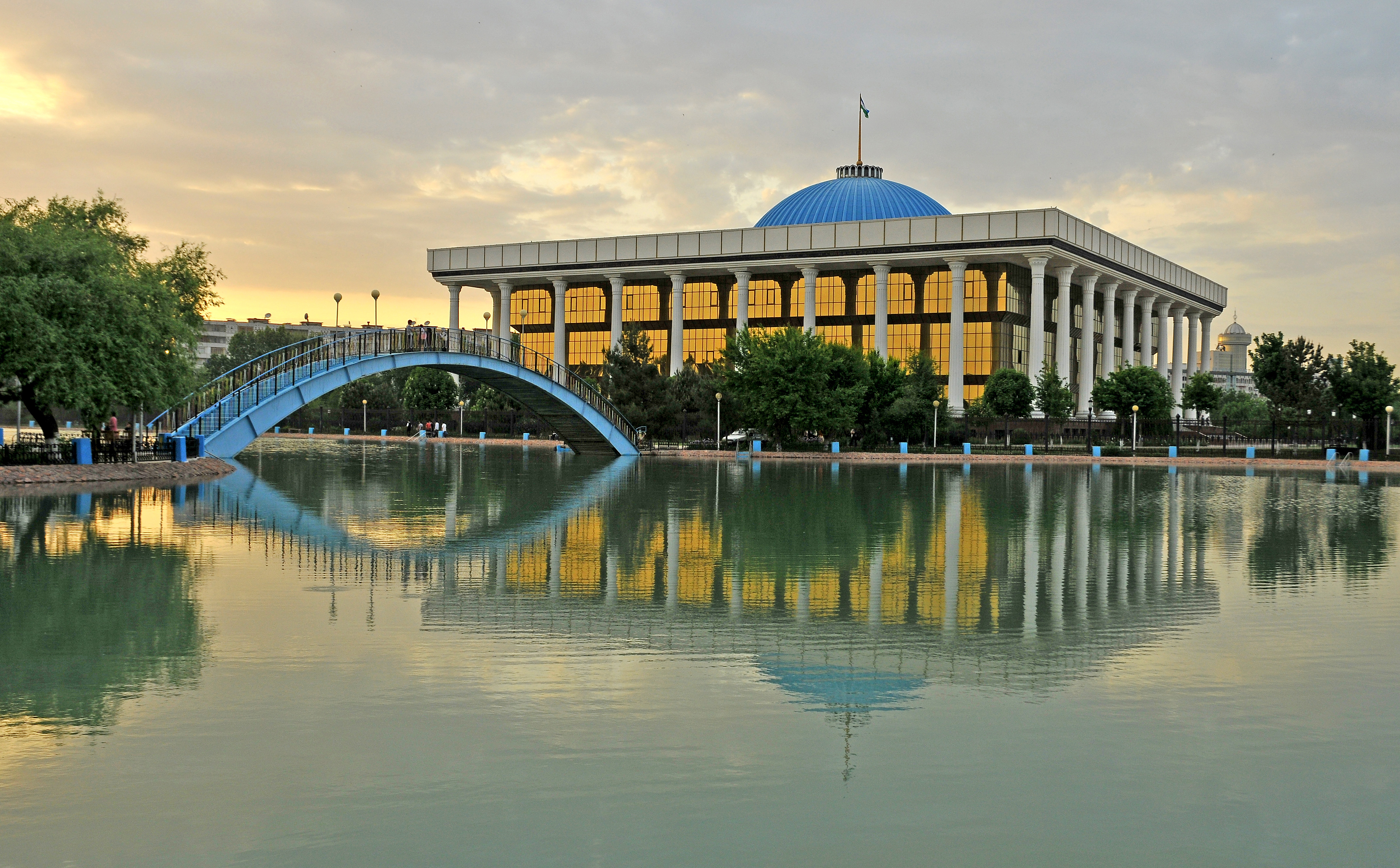
- Supreme Assembly and Legislative Chamber Building in Tashkent

Website
- http://senat.uz/; http://parliament.gov.uz/

The Oliy Majlis (Uzbek pronunciation: [ɔˈli mɐdʒˈlɪs]) is the parliament of the Republic of Uzbekistan. It succeeded the Supreme Council in 1995, and was unicameral until a reform implemented in January 2005 created a second chamber. The current fifth parliament was first convened on 27 October 2024.

The Legislative Chamber has 150 deputies elected from territorial constituencies. The Senate has 100 members: 84 elected from the regions of Uzbekistan, and 16 nominated by the President of Uzbekistan.

Both houses have five-year terms.

== Etymology ==
The word Oliy (عالي) is the Arabic word for higher or upper, while Majlis (مجلس) is the Arabic word for a sitting room, however it also refers to a legislature (Seat of government) as well, and is used in the name of legislative councils or assemblies in some states of the Islamic world.

== History ==
=== Supreme Soviet of the Uzbek SSR ===
The Supreme Soviet of the Uzbek SSR (Uzbek: Ўзбекистон ССР Олий Совети, Russian: Верховный Совет Узбекской ССР, romanized: Verkhovny Sovet Uzbekskoy SSR) operated in the country during the Soviet era as its main legislature. Since its establishment in July 1938, when it succeeded the All-Uzbek Congress of Soviets, it has held 12 convocations:

- 1st convocation (1938–1946)
- 2nd convocation (1947–1950)
- 3rd convocation (1951–1954)
- 4th convocation (1955–1959)
- 5th convocation (1959–1962)
- 6th convocation (1963–1966)
- 7th convocation (1967–1970)
- 8th convocation (1971–1974)
- 9th convocation (1975–1979)
- 10th convocation (1980–1984)
- 11th convocation (1985–1989)
- 12th convocation (1990–1994)

On 31 August 1991, during an extraordinary 6th session of the Supreme Soviet, the independence and sovereignty of Uzbekistan was proclaimed. In 1992, the Soviet was renamed to reflect the country's new independence status. After the last convocation, the Supreme Soviet was dissolved and converted into the Supreme Assembly in February 1995.

== Office holders ==
From February 1995 to January 2005, the Chairman of the unicameral Supreme Assembly of Uzbekistan was Erkin Khalilov, who had been Acting Chairman of the Supreme Soviet from 1993 to 1995. Since 2005 the Senate and Legislative Chamber have each had their own presiding officer.

=== Speaker of the Legislative Chamber ===
- Erkin Khalilov (January 27, 2005 – January 23, 2008)
- Diloram Tashmukhamedova (January 23, 2008 – January 12, 2015)
- Nuriddinjon Ismailov (since January 12, 2015, Incumbent)

=== Chairman of the Senate ===
- Murat Sharifkhodjayev (27 January 2005 – 24 February 2006)
- Ilgizar Sobirov (24 February 2006 – 22 January 2015)
- Nigmatilla Yuldashev (22 January 2015 – 21 June 2019)
- Tanzila Norbaeva (21 June 2019 – present)

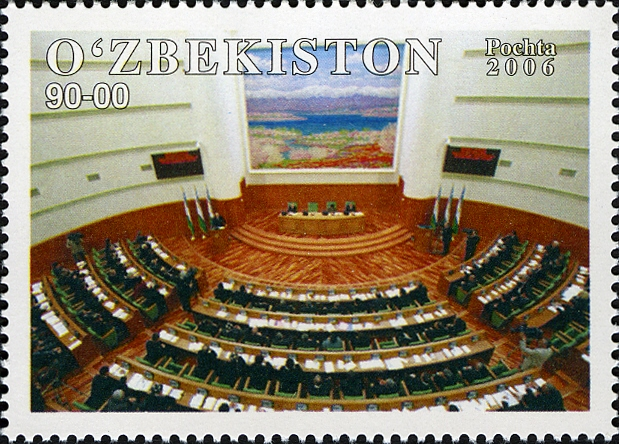
Oliy Majlis chamber on a 2006 Uzbek stamp

== See also ==
- Politics of Uzbekistan
- List of legislatures by country
