= Anvar Juraboev =

Uzbek journalist and politician

- Born: 22 May 1948; Bulungur, Uzbek SSR, Soviet Union
- Died: 16 September 2010 (aged 62); Tashkent, Uzbekistan
- Occupations: Journalist, historian and politician
- Spouse: Umida Tursunova (m. 1973)
- Children: 3

Anvar Juraboev (Uzbek: Анвар Жўрабоев, Russian: Анвар Джурабаев; 22 May 1948 – 16 September 2010) was an Uzbek journalist, historian and politician. He was involved in creation of the newly independent Uzbekistan's constitution. He co-founded and served as head of the Uzbek political party Adolat, and was an editor in chief of numerous newspapers.

== Personal life ==
Anvar Juraboev was born on 22 May 1948, in Bulungur district of Samarkand region in the Uzbek SSR. From childhood he was interested in journalism. He graduated with Bachelor of Arts degree from the Philological department of Moscow State Pedagogical University in 1971. He married Umida Tursunova in 1973, his classmate from university and they had three children.

== Career in journalism ==
In 1971 Juraboev started as an editor, later became a correspondent, and eventually the chief of the information department for regional newspaper Zarafshon in Samarkand, until 1974. From 1974 to 1975 Juraboev was a correspondent for the regional newspaper На страже родины (Na Straje Rodini) newspaper in Leningrad region (now St. Petersburg) From 1975 to 1981 Juraboev was with regional newspaper Jizzakh Haqiqati in Jizzakh. From 1981 to 1990 the executive secretary for the national journal Sovet Uzbekiston Sanati (now Guliston) in Tashkent. After the collapse of Soviet Union in 1991 Juraboev was an assistant editor-in-chief for the newly established national newspaper Halq suzi in Tashkent. From 1992 to 1997, Juraboev was an editor-in-chief of Khalq suzi and Narodnoye slovo. From 1998 to 2008 he was an editor-in-chief of newly established international newspaper Culture of the Central Asia in Tashkent. The newspaper was published in Kazakh, Tajik, Kirgyz, Uzbek, Turkmen and Russian languages in five Central Asian republics.

== Career in politics ==
From 1991 to 1992 Juraboev was a consultant in the apparatus of Oliy Kengash of Uzbekistan (the Parliament). Anvar Juraboev was a member of the commission working on the new Constitution of the Republic of Uzbekistan in 1992. He was one of the founders of the social-democratic party of Uzbekistan Adolat (Justice - Social Democratic Party of Uzbekistan) and served as its first leader from February 1995 to November 1996. Also in 1995 Juraboev was elected member of Oliy Majlis (Parliament of Uzbekistan) from Bulungur district of Samarkand region and served until 2000. In 2000 Juraboev permanently step down from politics to concentrate on newly established newspaper Culture of the Central Asia.
