= Vice President of Uzbekistan =

Government title

- Uzbek: Oʻzbekiston Jumhuriyati (Respublikasi) vitse-prezidenti
- Emblem of Uzbekistan (1978–1992)

- Flag of Uzbekistan (from 1991)

- Only officeholder Shukrullo Mirsaidov; March 1990–8 January 1992
- Style: Mr. Vice President (informal) (Uzbek: Janob vitse-prezidenti); The Honorable (formal); His Excellency (diplomatic)
- Member of: Cabinet of Ministers; Security Council
- Appointer: President; with Supreme Council's advice and consent
- Precursor: None
- Formation: 24 March 1990
- First holder: Shukrullo Mirsaidov
- Final holder: Shukrullo Mirsaidov
- Abolished: 8 January 1992
- Superseded by: Prime Minister of Uzbekistan

The office of Vice President of Uzbekistan was a political position which took the second-highest ranking office in the order of precedence of Uzbekistan until it was abolished on January 8, 1992. It was the title of the deputy to the President of Uzbekistan. Shukrullo Mirsaidov was the first and only holder of the office from 24 March 1990 to 8 January 1992.

== History ==
The position of vice president was introduced on the same day Islam Karimov was elected President of the Uzbek SSR on March 24, 1990 at a session of the Supreme Council of the Uzbek SSR. Uzbekistan at that point became the first union republic to introduce the positions of president and vice president, roles often seen in the west. The only person who served as vice president was Shukrullo Mirsaidov, who, before this position, was the Chairman of the Council of Ministers of the Uzbek SSR. After the abolition of the post of vice president on January 8, 1992, the post of prime minister was introduced in the country.

Name	Took office	Left office	Notes
Shukrullo Mirsaidov	March 1990	8 January 1992	

== Functions ==
The main function of the vice-president of Uzbekistan was to, in the case of the president's incapacitation, death or resignation and until early elections, assume presidential powers as acting president At the same time, the vice-president of Uzbekistan, jointly headed the Cabinet of Ministers with the president.

Nowadays, article 96 of the Constitution of Uzbekistan states that should the President of the Republic fail to perform his duties due to poor health, confirmed by a certificate of a State Medical Commission formed by the Supreme Assembly of Uzbekistan (Oliy Majlis), an emergency session of the Oliy Majlis shall be held within ten days. The session shall elect an Acting President of the Republic for a term of not more than three months, during which time a presidential election shall be held.

Other powers of the Vice president were:

1. presiding the cabinet meetings in the case when the president is absent in session;
2. coordinating across ministries and state committees to implement government policy;
3. acting as the representative of the president in legislature or at official events;
4. servest as the second-in-command politically;
5. acts as chief negotiator or troubleshooter in cabinet disputes;

== See also ==
- List of leaders of Uzbekistan
- President of Uzbekistan
- Prime Minister of Uzbekistan
