= Ministry of Economy (Uzbekistan) =

Government ministry of Uzbekistan

Economic ministry overview
- Formed: January 22, 2002
- Jurisdiction: Government of Uzbekistan
- Headquarters: 45A Uzbekistan Avenue, Tashkent, Uzbekistan
- Minister responsible: Botir Xoʻjayev
- Website: mineconomy.uz

The Ministry of Economy is a government agency of Uzbekistan which oversees the socio-economic development and management, working with other departments in ministries in the country. The ministry has many functions, including the oversight and development of a stable macroeconomy, development of the market, development of economic scenarios, and keeping track of economic demographics.
