= Milliy Tiklanish =

Political party in Uzbekistan

Uzbekistan National Revival Democratic Party Oʻzbekiston Milliy tiklanish demokratik partiyasi
- Abbreviation: Milliy Tiklanish; OʻzMTDP
- Leader: Alisher Qodirov
- Founded: 3 June 1995; 30 years ago
- Registered: 9 June 1995; 30 years ago
- Headquarters: Chilanzar St. 53, Tashkent
- Newspaper: Milliy Tiklanish
- Ideology: National conservatism
- Political position: Right-wing
- National affiliation: Bloc of Democratic Forces
- Colours: Blue
- Legislative Chamber: 29 / 150
- Senate: 0 / 100

Website
- mt.uz

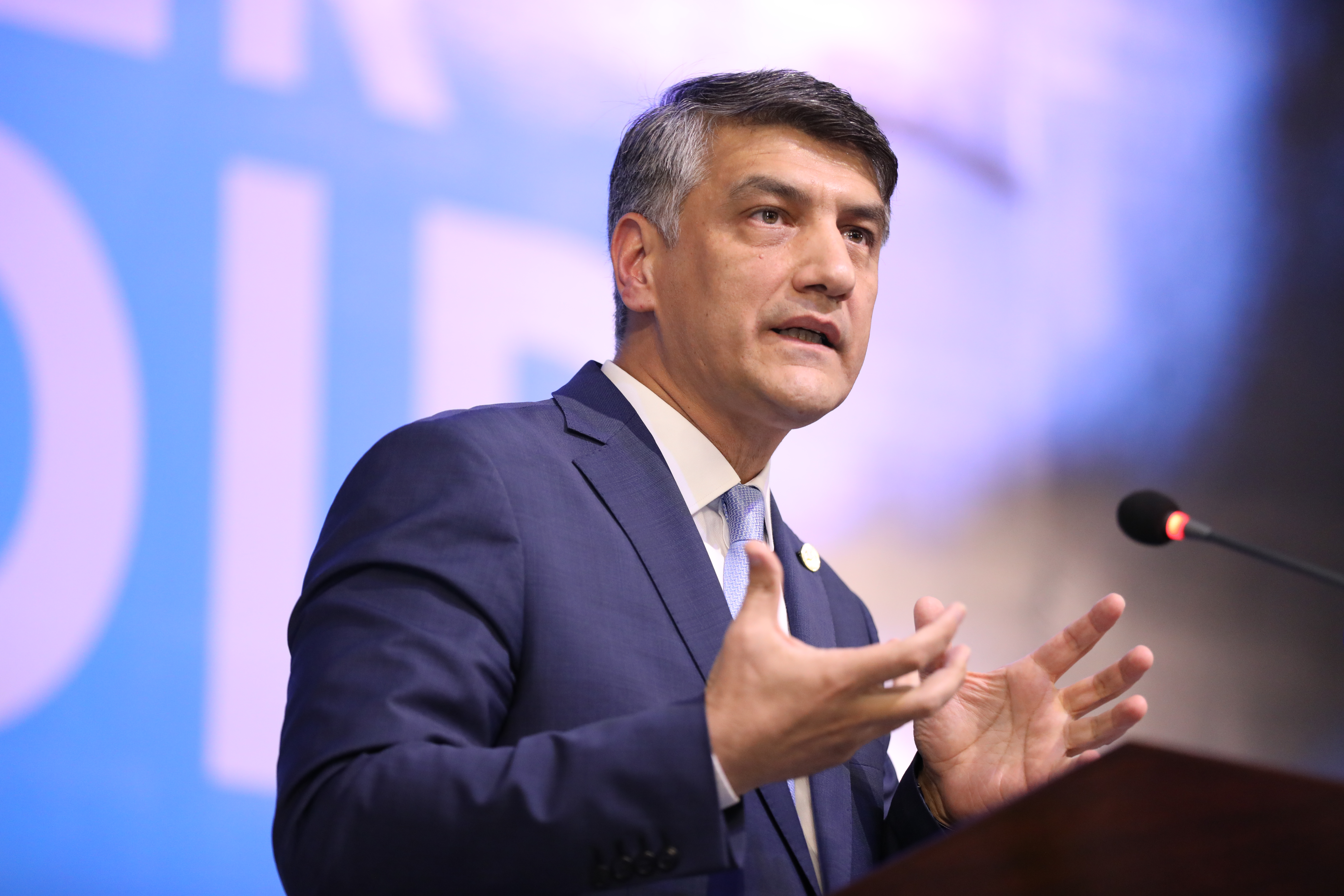
Current leader of Milliy Tiklanish, Alisher Qodirov

The Uzbekistan National Revival Democratic Party (Uzbek: Oʻzbekiston Milliy tiklanish demokratik partiyasi, OʻzMTDP), often known as simply Milliy Tiklanish, is a national conservative political party in Uzbekistan. It is allied with the Uzbekistan Liberal Democratic Party, the country's ruling party.

The party is one of the country's five officially sanctioned political parties, along with the People's Democratic Party of Uzbekistan, the Uzbekistan Liberal Democratic Party, the Justice Social Democratic Party (also known as Adolat), and the Ecological Party of Uzbekistan.

== History ==
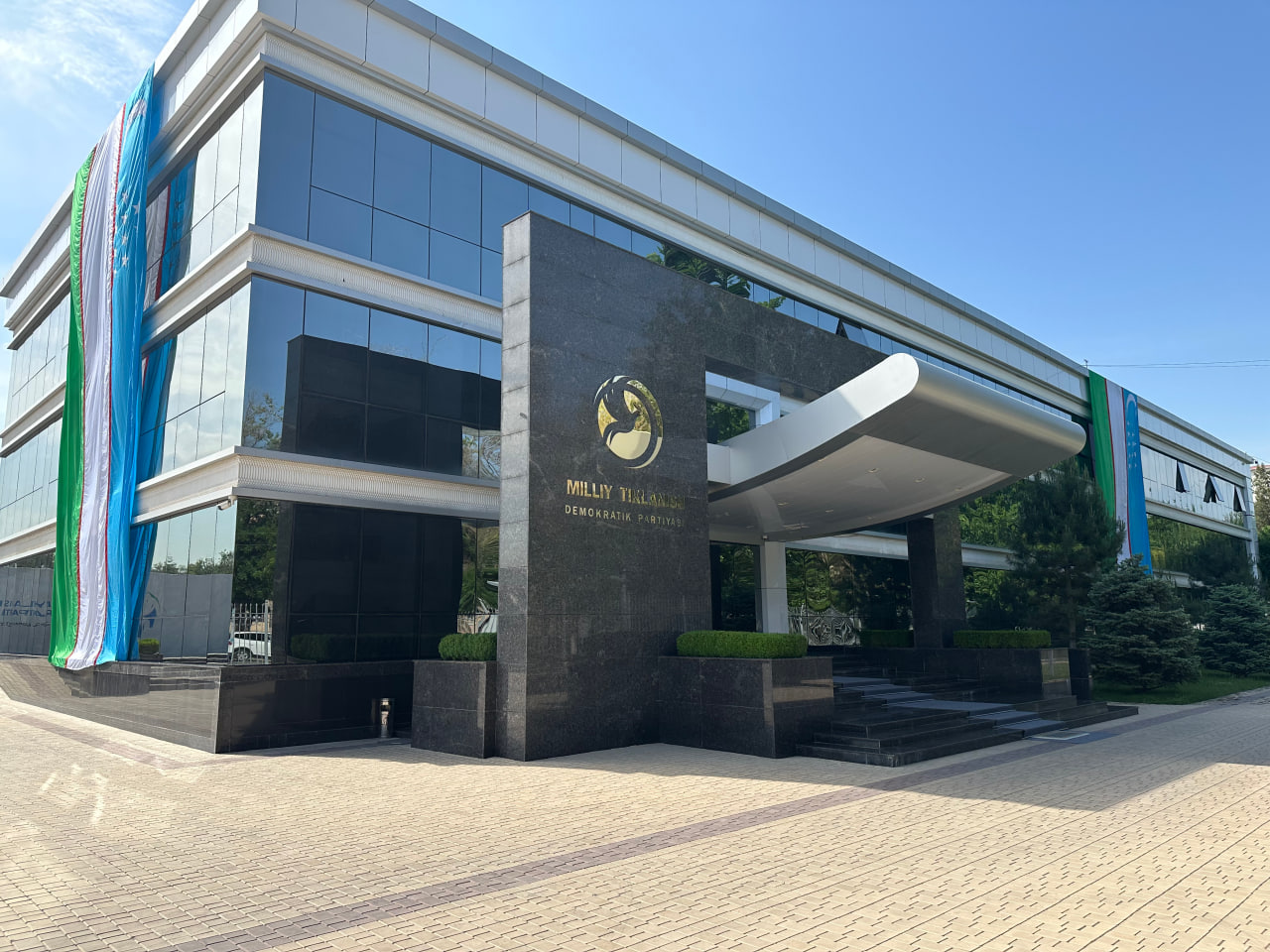
Central office of the party in Tashkent

On June 3, 1995, the party was created by the decision of the founding congress of the Democratic Party of Uzbekistan "Milliy Tiklanish" (MTDP); Aziz Kaiumov, director of the Institute of Manuscripts of the Academy of Sciences, was elected chairman. On 9 June the party was registered with the Ministry of Justice. On June 10, 1995, the first issue of the party newspaper Milliy Tiklanish was published.

On December 28, 1998, the Self-Sacrifice National Democratic Party, or the National Democratic Party of Uzbekistan Fidokorlar (DP Fidokorlar), held its founding congress. It merged with Milliy Tiklanish on June 20, 2008, forming the new Uzbekistan Milliy Tiklanish Democratic Party (O'zMTDP). On August 11, 2008, the new party was registered with the Ministry of Justice.

Between 1996 and 2004, the chairman of the party's Central Council was writer Ibrokhim Gafurov, who was also editor-in-chief of the party newspaper. Khurshid Dustmuhammad was elected chairman of the Central Council at the 3rd MT congress on 31 October, 2004. Alisher Qodirov became head of the party in May 2019 before becoming Deputy Speaker of the country's Legislative Chamber (Oliy Majlis) in June.

In an analysis conducted May–June 2004, MTDP was found to have the most influence in the regions of Tashkent and Fergana.

In August 2008, the party joined the "Democratic Bloc” in the Legislative Chamber, alongside the Justice Social Democratic Party (Adolat) and the Liberal Democratic Party. In May 2025 it declared itself part of the "Progressive Bloc" alongside the Liberal Democratic Party, which holds the majority of legislative seats.

=== Organization and membership ===
Since September 9, 2008, founding conferences of O'zMTDP and plenums of regional party organizations were held in the regions. They approved the composition of the Council, the Control and Audit Commission, the Executive Committee of the Council, and elected the Chairman of the Executive Committee and his deputies. In addition, founding conferences and plenums of district (city) party organizations were held, the composition of the Council and the Executive Committee of the Council was approved, and chairmen of the executive committee were elected.

In 2009, Milliy Tiklanish had 50,000 members, of which 25 percent were female. This number increased to 185,000 in 2014. As of April 1, 2022, the party had 358,377 members, of which 48% were young people and 44% were women. The party had 14 territorial organizations (Republic of Karakalpakstan, regions and the city of Tashkent), 175 district councils of 32 cities and 7,032 primary party organizations.

== Ideology ==
Old party logo

Party logo until 2021

Milliy Tiklanish is described as conservative and supporting patriotism, initially founded by "members of the humanitarian intelligentsia" to initiate a revival of the Uzbekistan state and culture. The party advocates a strong sense of Uzbek culture while seeking to build closer links with other states in Central Asia. The party opposes the influence of Russia in the region and attacked the foundation of the Eurasian Economic Community on this basis. The party also encourages the development of scientific and technical skills within Uzbekistan and the construction of a society based around a liberal market economy.

== Election results ==
In the 2004–05 Uzbek parliamentary election, the party won 11 out of 120 seats. The party's candidate for the 2007 Uzbek presidential election was Hurshid Dustmuhammad.

On December 27, 2009, 31 deputies were elected to the Legislative Chamber of the Oliy Majlis, and 954 to local Councils of People's Deputies. In 2014; that increased to 36 and 1,105 respectively. On December 24, 2019, O'zMTDP had 36 deputies elected to the Legislative Chamber and 1,266 deputies in the local Councils of People's Deputies.

=== Presidential elections ===
Election	Party candidate	Votes	%	Votes	%	Result
Election	Party candidate	First round		Second round		Result
2015	Akmal Saidov	582,688	3.08	—	—	Lost ✗
2016	Sarvar Otamuradov	421,055	2.35	—	—	Lost ✗
2021	Alisher Qodirov	888,515	5.49	—	—	Lost ✗

=== Legislative Chamber elections ===
Election	Seats	+/–	Position
2004–05	11 / 120 (Note: Self-Sacrifice National Democratic Party won 18 seats.)	New	▲4th
2009–10	31 / 150	▲20	▲3rd
2014–15	36 / 150	▲5	▲2nd
2019–20	36 / 150	0	2nd
2024	29 / 150	▼7	2nd

== Party newspaper ==
The Milliy Tiklanish newspaper is a weekly socio-political publication of Milliy Tiklanish, published since June 10, 1995. The newspaper covers the activities of the party as well as the activities of deputies of all levels elected from the party. The current editor-in-chief is Mirodil Abdurakhmanov.

Based on the reforms of the "New Uzbekistan", the demands and proposals of newspaper owners, the Milliy Tiklanish newspaper has radically changed both in content and in form.

== Bibliography ==
- Kamoliddin, Rabbimov (2007). "Politicheskiye partii Uzbekistana: mezhdu pravitel'stvom i obshchestvom" Политические партии Узбекистана: между правительством и обществом [Political Parties of Uzbekistan: Between Government and Society]. Central Asia and the Caucasus (in Russian). 1 (49): 67–84. ISSN 1403-7068.
