= 2000 Uzbek presidential election =

- 9 January 2000
- Registered: 12,746,903
- Turnout: 95.11% (▲0.95pp)
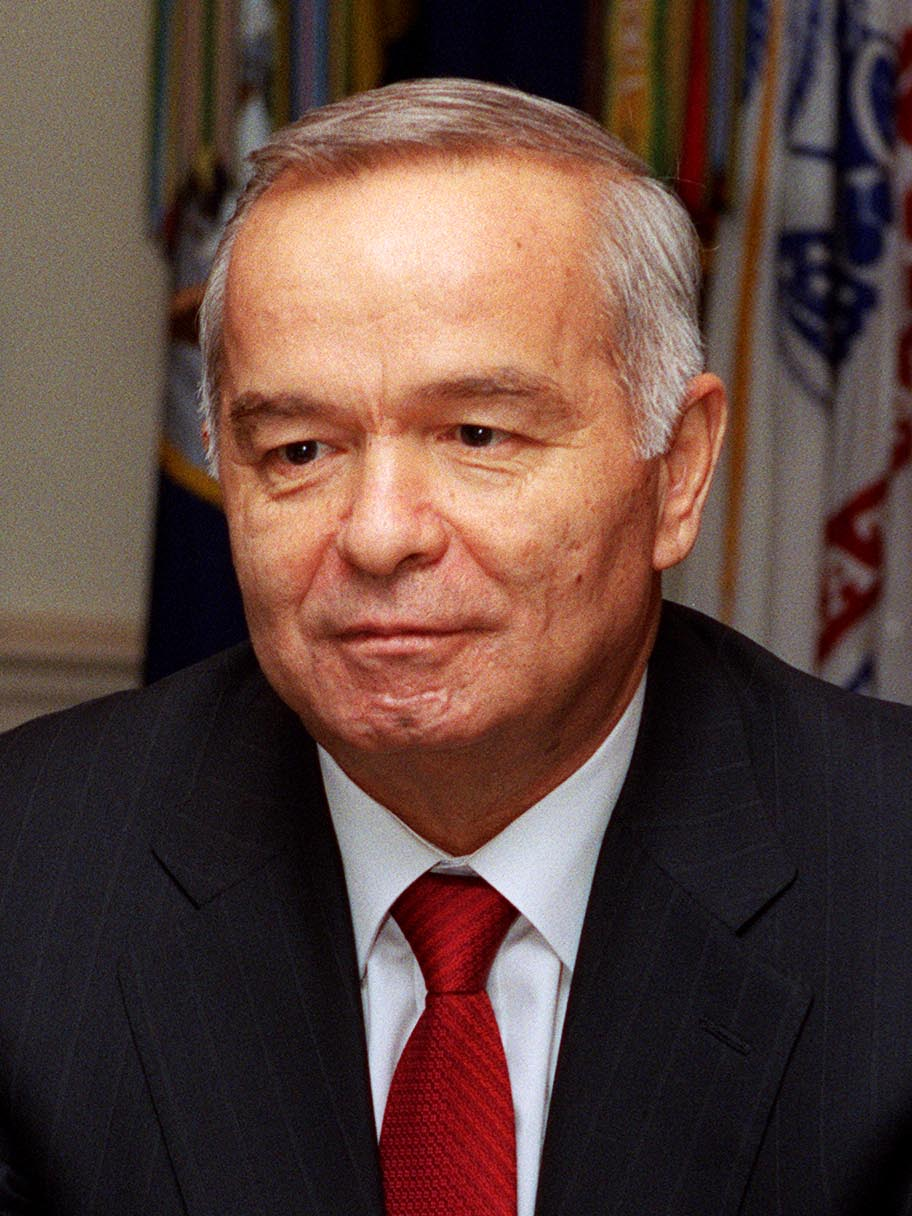

Nominee	Islam Karimov	Abdulhafiz Jalolov
Party	Fidokorlar	XDP
Popular vote	11,147,621	505,161
Percentage	95.66%	4.34%
President before election
Islam Karimov
XDP
Elected President
Islam Karimov
XDP

Presidential elections were held in Uzbekistan on 9 January 2000. The result was a victory for incumbent Islam Karimov, who received 96% of the vote. Turnout was reported to be 95%.

Two candidates participated in the elections; Islam Karimov, the incumbent president and Abdulkhafiz Jalolov, the First Secretary of the largest party in the country, the People's Democratic Party of Uzbekistan (XDP). While Jalolov was nominated by the XDP, Karimov was surprisingly nominated by a new party, the Self-Sacrifice National Democratic Party (FMDP). Many outside observers stated that Karimov was actually in control of these two parties, and Jalolov was only allowed to run as a candidate to give an illusion of democratic election.

The elections were not democratic. Jalolov, a former Marxist historian and ideologist from the defunct Communist Party of Uzbekistan, was little known to voters, compared to Karimov. The two candidates' programmes were described by Radio Free Europe/Radio Liberty as having only few differences. Jalolov was also reported to always praise and quote Karimov in his campaign speeches. At the end, after he voted, Jalolov stated that he had voted for Karimov "...for stability, peace, our nation's independence and the development of Uzbekistan". Many of the voters, when asked by the BBC, also said that they supported Karimov.

The Organization for Security and Co-operation in Europe stated that the vote "falls far short of OSCE commitments in terms of fulfilling obligations for democratic elections" and not giving voters a real choice. The elections were also criticized by Karimov's opponents, Muhammad Solih (a candidate in the 1991 presidential elections), and Abdurakhim Pulatov.

== Results ==
Candidate	Party	Votes	%
Islam Karimov	Self-Sacrifice National Democratic Party	11,147,621	95.66
Abdulhafiz Jalolov	People's Democratic Party of Uzbekistan	505,161	4.34
Total		11,652,782	100.00
Valid votes		11,652,782	96.12
Invalid/blank votes		470,417	3.88
Total votes		12,123,199	100.00
Registered voters/turnout		12,746,903	95.11
Source: Nohlen et al.
