= Erkin Khalilov =

Uzbek politician (born 1955)

Erkin Khalilov is a politician from Uzbekistan and former legislative speaker from 1993 to 2008.

Khalilov was born in 1955 in Navoi. He has a degree from Tashkent State University.

Khalilov became deputy in the Supreme Council of Uzbekistan in 1990. He was elected chairman of the Supreme Council of Uzbekistan in December 1993 and continued as the speaker when the unicameral Supreme Assembly of Uzbekistan was formed in February 1995 and continued until January 2005 when two legislative chambers were established. Khalilov was the Speaker of the lower chamber, Legislative Chamber of Uzbekistan, from 27 January 2005 to 23 January 2008, when he resigned.
