= 2015 Uzbek presidential election =

- 29 March 2015
- Registered: 20,798,052
- Turnout: 91.08% (▲0.48pp)
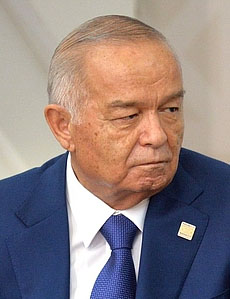

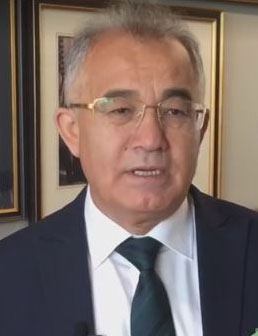
Nominee	Islam Karimov	Akmal Saidov
Party	OʻzLiDeP	Milliy Tiklanish
Popular vote	17,122,597	582,688
Percentage	91.83%	3.12%
President before election
Islam Karimov
OʻzLiDeP
Elected President
Islam Karimov
OʻzLiDeP

Presidential elections were held in Uzbekistan on 29 March 2015. The result was a victory for incumbent President Islam Karimov, who received over 90% of the vote. Karimov's win gave him a fourth consecutive term as president, dating back to 1990.

== Background ==
A constitutional law on presidential elections was approved by the Senate on 23 March 2012, which required presidential elections to be held 90 days after parliamentary elections. Elections to the Legislative Chamber were held over two-rounds, the first on 23 December 2014 and the second on 4 January 2015.

The law change effectively shortened the term of incumbent President Islam Karimov by several months, as under the previous law, the elections would have been held on 27 December 2015. Though the constitution limits presidents to two terms in office, the Central Election Commission allowed Karimov to run again, arguing that Karimov had only served one term since the constitution was adopted in 2002, and that his previous two terms before that should not count.

== Candidates ==
The candidates were:

- Islam Karimov of the Liberal Democratic Party, president since 1990
- Khatamjan Ketmanov of the People's Democratic Party
- Nariman Umarov of the Justice Social Democratic Party
- Akmal Saidov of the National Revival Democratic Party

All candidates were loyal to Karimov.

== Conduct ==
The Organization for Security and Co-operation in Europe stated that the Uzbek poll lacked genuine opposition. Steve Swerdlow at Human Rights Watch called the vote a "sham election". Observers from the Commonwealth of Independent States and Shanghai Cooperation Organisation called the election "open, free, and democratic," and said it had proceeded "openly and democratically," respectively.

== Results ==
Candidate	Party	Votes	%
Islam Karimov	Liberal Democratic Party	17,122,597	91.83
Akmal Saidov	National Revival Democratic Party	582,688	3.12
Hotamjon Ketmonov	People's Democratic Party	552,309	2.96
Nariman Umarov	Justice Social Democratic Party	389,024	2.09
Total		18,646,618	100.00
Valid votes		18,646,618	98.44
Invalid/blank votes		295,731	1.56
Total votes		18,942,349	100.00
Registered voters/turnout		20,798,052	91.08
Source: CEC
