= Nuriddinjon Ismailov =

Uzbekistani politician (born 1959)

- Nuriddin Ismoilov

Speaker of the Legislative Chamber of Uzbekistan
- Incumbent
- Assumed office 12 January 2015
- Preceded by: Diloram Tashmukhamedova

Personal details
- Born: January 20, 1959 (age 67) Uchqoʻrgʻon District, Uzbek SSR, Soviet Union
- Party: People's Democratic Party of Uzbekistan
- Education: Tashkent State University

Nuriddinjon Mo'ydinxonovich Ismailov (born 20 January 1959) is an Uzbek politician who is serving as Speaker of the Legislative Chamber of Uzbekistan. He was first elected to that position on 12 January 2015.

Ismoilov was born on 20 January 1959. He has a law degree from Tashkent State University. He is a member of People's Democratic Party of Uzbekistan.
