= 2007 Uzbek presidential election =

- 23 December 2007
- Registered: 16,297,400
- Turnout: 90.60% (▼4.51pp)
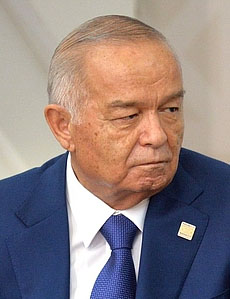

Nominee	Islam Karimov	Asliddin Rustamov
Party	OʻzLiDeP	XDP
Popular vote	13,008,357	468,064
Percentage	90.77%	3.27%
President before election
Islam Karimov
OʻzLiDeP
Elected President
Islam Karimov
OʻzLiDeP

Presidential elections were held in Uzbekistan on 23 December 2007. Incumbent president Islam Karimov was re-elected with 91% of the vote.

== Background ==
According to the constitution, incumbent President Islam Karimov's term was considered to have ended on 22 January 2007. However, electoral legislation stated that "an election must be held in December of the year in which the president's term expires"; this de facto extension of Karimov's term to eight years was heavily criticised by the opposition.

== Candidates ==
Although Karimov was widely considered to be constitutionally ineligible for another term, analysts expected him to remain in power. Of the six candidates announced by September 2007, only Dilorom Toshmuhamedova of the Justice Social Democratic Party had officially filed with the Electoral Commission; there were rumours that the other five (Suhbat Abdullayev, Akbar Aliyev, Abdullo Tojiboy O‘g‘li, Axtam Shoymardonov and Jahongir Shosalimov) have been pressured into running to make Uzbekistan appear more democratic than it really is. By early October, two other candidates had filed: Xurshid Do‘stmuhammad (or Do‘stmuhamedov) of the Uzbekistan National Revival Democratic Party and Axtam Tursunov of Self-Sacrifice National Democratic Party. The Uzbekistan Liberal Democratic Party said in early October that it intended to nominate Karimov. On 6 November, Karimov was unanimously chosen as the Liberal Democratic Party's presidential candidate at a party convention in Tashkent, and Karimov accepted the nomination.

A legal explanation to justify Karimov's candidacy, in light of the constitutional limit of two terms for presidents, was not officially given. It was suggested that, because Karimov had only served one seven-year term (he was first elected to a five-year term, which was later extended by referendum), he is eligible to run for a second seven-year term; by this reasoning his first term would not count toward the total.

On 19 November, the Chairman of the Central Election Commission, Mirza-Ulug‘bek Abdusalomov, announced that the candidacies of Karimov, Toshmuhamedova (the first woman to run in an Uzbek presidential election), Asliddin Rustamov of the Uzbekistan People's Democratic Party, and Akmal Saidov (who was nominated by a citizens' group) were approved. Two candidates, including Abdullo Tojiboy O‘g‘li, were rejected by the Commission on the grounds that they had not collected enough signatures, with signatures from 5% of eligible voters being required. The Commission did not explain its reasoning in approving Karimov's candidacy. Opposition groups reacted with anger and bitterness toward the Commission's decision, which they considered illegal. Aside from Karimov, the other three candidates approved by the Commission are considered friendly towards the government, and their participation was criticized as window-dressing for an election in which there was no genuine opposition.

== Conduct ==
While the Organization for Security and Cooperation in Europe (OSCE) had a team of 21 observers in the country, it officially considered the elections "pointless due to the obvious limited nature of the competition". The OSCE observers criticized the election as lacking a "genuine choice", and OSCE spokesperson Urður Gunnarsdóttir said that the "election was held in a very controlled political environment, which did not really leave much room for real opposition and this election failed to meet many of the commitments that OSCE states have made to hold democratic elections." She also said that the seemingly positive presence of four candidates in the election had been undermined by the other candidates' endorsement of Karimov. The OSCE also questioned the official turnout figure of 90.6%.

Observers from the Commonwealth of Independent States and the Shanghai Cooperation Organisation gave the election a positive assessment.

== Results ==
By midday on 23 December 60% of eligible voters had participated according to the Central Election Commission, exceeding the 33.3% minimum participation rate to make the election valid.

Candidate	Party	Votes	%
Islam Karimov	Uzbekistan Liberal Democratic Party	13,008,357	90.77
Asliddin Rustamov	People's Democratic Party of Uzbekistan	468,064	3.27
Dilorom Toshmuhamedova	Justice Social Democratic Party	434,111	3.03
Akmal Saidov	Independent	420,815	2.94
Total		14,331,347	100.00
Valid votes		14,331,347	97.06
Invalid/blank votes		434,097	2.94
Total votes		14,765,444	100.00
Registered voters/turnout		16,297,400	90.60
Source: elections.uz

== Aftermath ==
Karimov was sworn in for his new term on 16 January 2008, saying that he would "mobilize all my power, knowledge and experience to fully implement all our priority goals set out in the election program".
