= 2002 Uzbek constitutional referendum =

27 January 2002

Do you agree that the next convocation of the Parliament of the Republic of Uzbekistan will be bicameral?
For	93.65%
Against	6.35%

Do you agree to change the constitutional term of office of the President of the Republic of Uzbekistan from five years to seven years?
For	91.78%
Against	8.22%

A constitutional referendum was held in Uzbekistan on 27 January 2002. Voters were asked two questions; one on extending the presidential term from five to seven years, and a second on introducing a bicameral parliament. Both were approved by over 90% of voters. Voter turnout was reported to be 92%.

== Results ==
=== Introducing a bicameral parliament ===
Choice	Votes	%
For	11,344,242	93.65
Against	768,828	6.35
Total	12,113,070	100.00
Registered voters/turnout	13,266,602	–
Source: Direct Democracy

=== Presidential term extension ===
Choice	Votes	%
For	11,117,841	91.78
Against	995,229	8.22
Total	12,113,070	100.00
Registered voters/turnout	13,266,602	–
Source: Direct Democracy
