= Shukrullo Mirsaidov =

Uzbek politician

Shukrullo Mirsaidov

Shukrullo Rahmatovich Mirsaidov (14 February 1939 – 2 November 2012) was a Soviet and Uzbek politician and the Vice President of Uzbekistan from March 1990 until the abolishment of the office on 8 January 1992.

Formerly mayor of Tashkent and a key ally of the first Uzbek President Islam Karimov, Mirsaidov had served as the last Chairman of the Council of Ministers (prime minister) of the Uzbek SSR (1990) and then as Vice President of Uzbekistan until Karimov abolished this office on 8 January 1992.

Mirsaidov criticised Karimov's administration, posing the most significant political threat to the administration at that time. Before his resignation, he sent an open letter to Karimov stating, "Democracy and a policy of openness are being replaced by an authoritarian regime." In 1993, he formed the Forum of Democratic Forces as an attempt to unite parties opposed to Karimov's rule. It was unsuccessful. Mirsaidov created a new party, Adolat (Justice) in December 1994, calling for liberal economic reforms, political pluralism and secularism.

Mirsaidov spent the rest of his life in Tashkent as an ordinary retiree and is said to have suffered from a heart disease. He died at the age of 73. According to some reports, his death was caused by a heart attack. Mirsaidov was buried in the Teshik Kapak Cemetery in Tashkent.

Preceded by None	Vice President of Uzbekistan; 1991–1992	Succeeded by Position abolished
