= Legislative Chamber of Uzbekistan =

Lower house of the parliament of Uzbekistan

Legislative Chamber of the Oliy Majlis of the Republic of Uzbekistan Oʻzbekiston Respublikasi Oliy Majlisi Qonunchilik palatasi (Uzbek)
- 5th Oliy Majlis
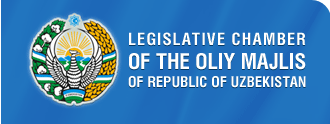

Type
- Type: Lower house of the Oliy Majlis
- Term limits: None

History
- Founded: 8 December 1992

Leadership
- Chairman: Nuriddinjon Ismailov since 12 January 2015

Structure
- Seats: 150
- Political groups: Government coalition (93); UzLiDeP (64); Milliy Tiklanish (29); Others (57); Adolat (21); People's Democratic Party (20); Ecological Party (16)
- Length of term: 5 years

Elections
- Voting system: Parallel voting: Closed list proportional representation (75 seats); First-past-the-post voting (75 seats)
- First election: 25 December 1994, 8 January and 22 January 1995
- Last election: 27 October 2024
- Next election: October 2029

Meeting place
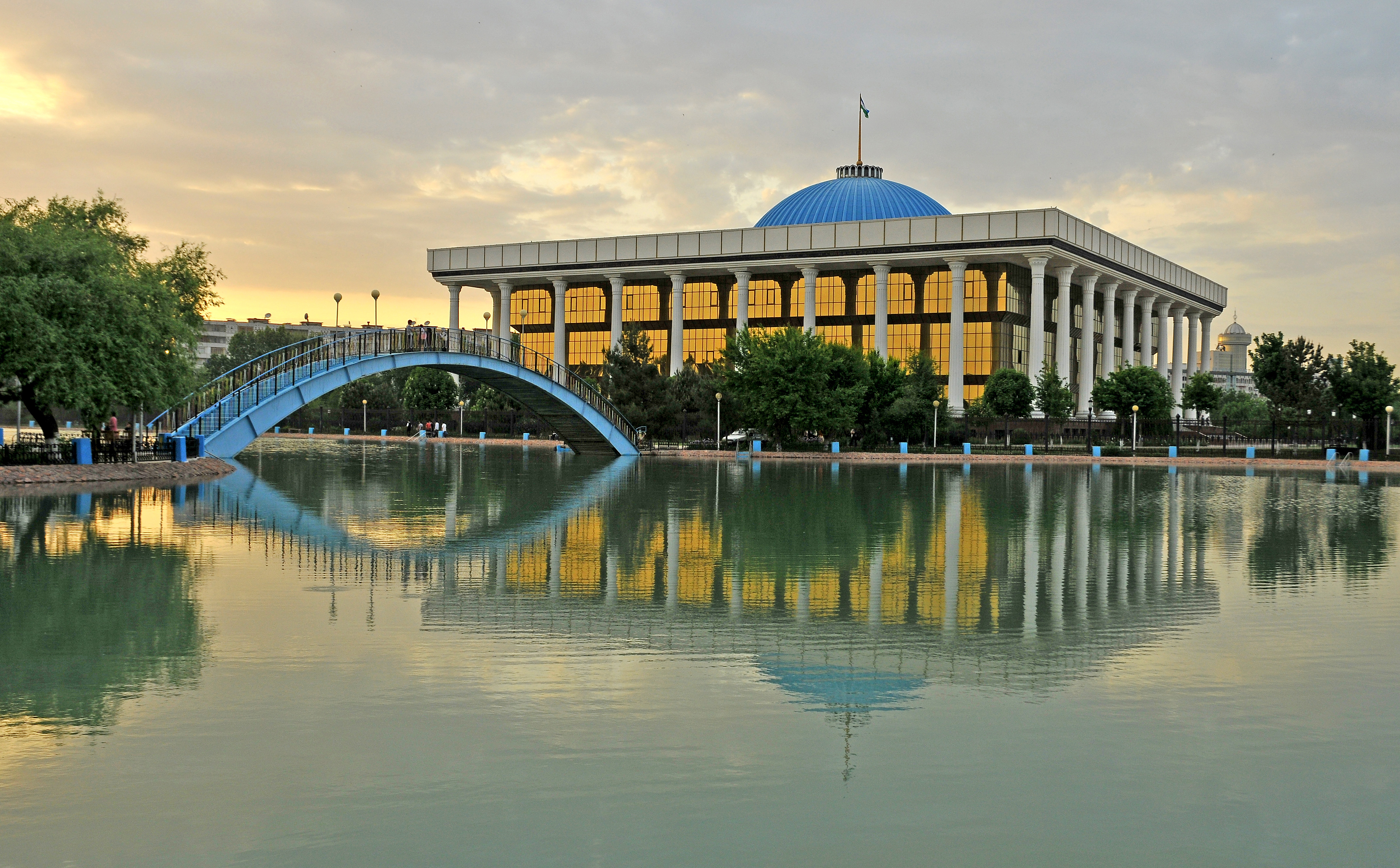
- Legislative Chamber Building in Tashkent

Website
- parliament.gov.uz

The Legislative Chamber (Uzbek: Qonunchilik palatasi) is the lower chamber of the Oliy Majlis of the Republic of Uzbekistan. It has 150 members, elected for a five-year term.

Elections of deputies to the Legislative Chamber are universal. Citizens of the Republic of Uzbekistan who have reached the age of eighteen by the election day have the right to vote. The citizens who have reached the age of twenty-five by the date of election and have been residing in the Republic of Uzbekistan for at least five years have the right to be elected to the Legislative Chamber. Citizens who are recognized to be incapacitated by the court, as well as persons held in places of detention by a court sentence, cannot be elected and participate in elections.

Voting at elections of deputies of the Legislative Chamber is free and secret. Control over the will of the voters is not allowed.

Seventy-five single-member territorial constituencies are formed for elections to the Legislative Chamber, with the remaining seventy-five members coming from one national district. Election districts for the election of deputies to the Legislative Chamber are formed by the Central Election Commission by the proposal of the Jokargi Kenes (parliament) of the Republic of Karakalpakstan, regional hokimiyats (administrations) and the city of Tashkent. Lists of electoral districts with indication of their borders and the number of voters are published by the Central Election Commission at least seventy-five days before the election.

The following persons are not eligible to register as candidates:

- Citizens who have pending or unserved sentences for serious or particularly serious crimes.
- Citizens who have not resided permanently in the territory of the Republic of Uzbekistan for the last five years before election day;
- Military personnel of the Armed Forces, employees of the National Security Service of the Republic of Uzbekistan, and other armed units;
- Professional ministers of religious organizations and associations.

== Chairpersons of the Legislative Chamber of Uzbekistan ==
Name	Period
Erkin Khalilov	27 January 2005 – 23 January 2008
Diloram Tashmukhamedova	23 January 2008 – 12 January 2015
Nuriddinjon Ismailov	12 January 2015 – present

== Latest elections ==
Party	Proportional			Constituency			Total seats	+/–
Party	Votes	%	Seats	Votes	%	Seats	Total seats	+/–
Liberal Democratic Party	5,194,041	34.75	26			38	64	+11
Milliy Tiklanish	2,812,493	18.82	14			15	29	−7
People's Democratic Party	2,558,016	17.11	13			7	20	−2
Adolat SDP	2,420,857	16.20	12			9	21	−3
Ecological Party	1,960,764	13.12	10			6	16	+1
Total	14,946,171	100.00	75			75	150	0
Valid votes	14,946,171	99.46						
Invalid/blank votes	81,358	0.54						
Total votes	15,027,529	100.00						
Registered voters/turnout	19,944,859	75.35						
Source: MSK, MSK
