= Uzbekistan Liberal Democratic Party =

Political party in Uzbekistan

Uzbekistan Liberal Democratic Party O‘zbekiston Liberal-demokratik partiyasi
- Abbreviation: UzLiDeP (English); OʻzLiDeP (Uzbek)
- Official leader: Aktam Haitov
- President: Shavkat Mirziyoyev
- Founded: 15 November 2003; 22 years ago
- Split from: People's Democratic Party of Uzbekistan
- Headquarters: Nukus street 73A, Tashkent.
- Newspaper: XXI asr
- Youth wing: UzLiDeP Youth Wing
- Ideology: Economic liberalism Civic nationalism Third Way
- Political position: Centre-right
- National affiliation: Democratic Forces Bloc (2005–2019)
- Colours: Blue
- Legislative Chamber: 64 / 150
- Senate: 41 / 100

Website
- uzlidep.uz

Logo until mid-2021

Logo during the summer of 2021

The Uzbekistan Liberal Democratic Party (UzLiDeP; Uzbek: O‘zbekiston Liberal-demokratik partiyasi, OʻzLiDeP, Ўзбекистон Либерал-демократик партияси, ЎзЛиДеП), officially the Movement of Entrepreneurs and Businessmen – Uzbekistan Liberal Democratic Party (Uzbek: Tadbirkorlar va ishbilarmonlar harakati-O‘zbekiston Liberal-demokratik partiyasi), is a political party in Uzbekistan and the country's ruling party. The four other parties in the Oliy Majlis, Uzbekistan's parliament, are pro-government. Its rule has been described as authoritarian.

== History ==
The party was founded in 2003 by Islam Karimov as a split from People's Democratic Party of Uzbekistan, which was led by Karimov from 1991 to until 1996, at which point Karimov stepped down and resigned his membership.

Despite self-identifying with different ideologies, the parties are seen as no different from each other, with the Uzbekistan Liberal Democratic Party being created to give an illusion of a competitive multi-party system; this is supported by the fact that the People's Democratic Party of Uzbekistan remained supportive of Karimov's policies and retained his favor.

== Ideology ==
As a self-described centre-right party of the middle class and private property owners, as well as businesspeople, farmers, and the service sector, it seeks to promote economic liberalism and economic liberalization, having liberalized the foreign currency market. The party is nominally liberal and supportive of liberal democratic values; however, its liberal practice on economic issues has not been reflected in practice at the political level, as it has ruled an authoritarian state, despite reforms following the death of long-time leader Islam Karimov in 2016.

== Electoral history ==
During the 2004–05 Uzbek parliamentary election, the party won 41 out of 120 seats. In the 2009–10 Uzbek parliamentary election, it won 55 out of 150. It has allied with the Uzbekistan National Revival Democratic Party, a conservative and right-wing party.

In October, the party said that it intended to nominate President Islam Karimov as its candidate in the 2007 Uzbek presidential election, although many considered Karimov to be legally ineligible to run for another term. On 6 November, Karimov was unanimously chosen as the party's presidential candidate at a party convention in Tashkent, and Karimov accepted the nomination. Karimov remained the president until his death in 2016. After the death of Karimov, long-time prime minister and party member Shavkat Mirziyoyev won the 2016 Uzbek presidential election to finish out Karimov's term. Mirziyoyev was re-elected in the 2021 Uzbek presidential election.

=== Presidential elections ===
Election	Party candidate	Votes	%	Votes	%	Result
Election	Party candidate	First round		Second round		Result
2007	Islam Karimov	13,008,357	90.8%	—	—	Elected ✓
2015	Islam Karimov	17,122,597	90.4%	—	—	Elected ✓
2016	Shavkat Mirziyoyev	15,906,724	88.6%	—	—	Elected ✓
2021	Shavkat Mirziyoyev	12,988,964	80.3%	—	—	Elected ✓
2023 (Note: Shavkat Mirziyoyev formally ran as an independent candidate, but was supported by the party.)	Shavkat Mirziyoyev	13,625,055	87.7%	—	—	Elected ✓

=== Legislative Chamber elections ===
Election	Leader	Seats	+/–	Position
2004–05		41 / 120	New	1st
2009–10	Muhammadusuf Teshabaev	53 / 135	▲12	1st
2014–15	Sodiqjon Turdiev	52 / 150	▼1	1st
2019–20	Aktam Haitov	53 / 150	▲1	1st
2024	Aktam Haitov	64 / 150	▲11	1st

== Sources ==
- Abdurasulov, Abdujalil (20 December 2019). "Questions over Uzbekistan's new era of 'openness'". BBC News.
- Lansford, Tom (2015). Political Handbook of the World 2015. SAGE Publications. ISBN 9781483371580 – via Google Books.
- Saidazimova, Gulnoza (4 October 2007). "Uzbek Party Signals Plan To Nominate Karimov For Third Term". Radio Free Europe/Radio Liberty.
- Sharifov, Omar (7 November 2007). "Islam Karimov agreed to remain the president another seven years". Ferghana. Archived from the original on 11 November 2007.
- "Uzbekistan: Mirziyoyev romps to victory, but with reduced vote share". Eurasianet. 25 October 2021.
- "What ideas do political parties advance?". Uzbekistan Today. 15 November 2016 – via The Permanent Mission of the Republic of Uzbekistan to the United Nations.
