= Ruling party =

Political party or coalition holding a majority of elected positions

Map of European nations coloured by percentage of vote governing party got in last election as of 2022

The ruling party or governing party in a democratic parliamentary or presidential system is the political party or coalition holding a majority of elected positions in a parliament, in the case of parliamentary systems, or holding the executive branch, in presidential systems, that administers the affairs of state after an election.

In many countries in the Commonwealth of Nations or even democratic republic countries like the Philippines, the ruling party is the party of the elected president or head of government that is in charge of the executive branch of government. In parliamentary systems, the majority in the legislature also controls the executive branch of government, thus leaving no possibility of opposing parties concurrently occupying the executive and legislative branches of government.

In other systems, such as in an American-style presidential system, the party of the president does not necessarily also have a legislative majority. A ruling party is also used to describe the party of one-party states, such as the Chinese Communist Party in the People's Republic of China.

== See also ==
- Dominant-party system
- Multi-party system
- Non-partisan democracy
- Party of power
- The Establishment
