= People's Democratic Party of Uzbekistan =

Political party in Uzbekistan

People's Democratic Party of Uzbekistan O‘zbekiston Xalq Demokratik Partiyasi
- Russian name: Народно-демократическая партия Узбекистана
- Abbreviation: XDP
- President: Ulugʻbek Inoyatov
- Founder: Islam Karimov
- Founded: 1 November 1991; 35 years ago
- Preceded by: Communist Party of Uzbekistan
- Headquarters: Tashkent
- Newspaper: Ozbekiston Ovozi
- Youth wing: Istikbol
- Women's wing: Faol Ayollar
- Membership (2021): 520,000
- Ideology: Civic nationalism Secularism; Social democracy Social conservatism Statism; Historical: Social market economy
- Political position: Centre-left to centre-right
- Colours: Purple
- Legislative Chamber: 20 / 150
- Senate: 28 / 100

Website
- xdp.uz
- Politics of Uzbekistan; Political parties; Elections; Green was the party colour until 2021.

The People's Democratic Party of Uzbekistan (Note: Uzbek: O‘zbekiston Xalq Demokratik Partiyasi (O‘zXDP), cyrillized: Ўзбекистон Халқ Демократик Партияси (ЎзХДП); Russian: Народно-демократическая партия Узбекистана (НДПУ), romanized: Narodno-demokraticheskaya partiya Uzbekistana (NDPU)) is a political party in Uzbekistan. It was founded in 1991 as the legal successor of the Communist Party of Uzbekistan. Under its founder Islam Karimov, it oversaw the dissolution of the Uzbek Soviet Socialist Republic and the establishment of the Republic of Uzbekistan. After Karimov resigned from the party in 1996 and later formed the Uzbekistan Liberal Democratic Party, it lost its ruling party status.

The party identifies with social democracy, conservatism and centre politics. In its statute, it promotes egalitarianism and a regulated social market economy within a welfare state, while supporting non-interventionism in foreign policy. Its core supporters are people who rely on social welfare, pensioners, people with disabilities, and employees. However, since the establishment of the Liberal Democratic Party, it has been opposed to government intervention.

== History ==
Party logo until 2021

The party was founded in October 1991 after the Communist Party of Uzbekistan voted to cut its ties with the Communist Party of the Soviet Union. It had been led by president Islam Karimov since its foundation until 1996, at which point Karimov stepped down and resigned his membership.

Karimov created the Uzbekistan Liberal Democratic Party (UzLiDeP) in 2003, and despite self-identifying with different ideologies, the parties are widely seen no different from each other, with the UzLiDeP being created to give an illusion of a competitive multi-party system; this is supported by the fact that XDP remained supportive of Karimov's policies and retained his favor. In 2013, Hotamzhon Ketmonov was elected chairman of XDP.

After the 2014–15 Uzbek parliamentary election, the party positioned at the parliamentary opposition of the centre-right, ruling party, UzLiDeP, and the Uzbekistan National Revival Democratic Party, a right-wing and moderate national conservative-oriented party. Ketmonov ran as the party's candidate in the 2015 Uzbek presidential election, receiving 2.92% of the vote.

In the 2021 Uzbek presidential election, Maqsuda Vorisova pledged to solve issues regarding education and medicine, and ran in a series of platforms related to egalitarian and social priorities in spheres to living standards, justice and equality, and democracy, which were seen to have correlated with the Nordic model. Although losing the race to incumbent Shavkat Mirziyoyev, Vorisova became one of the runner ups in the election, earning second place with 6.6% vote share, making her the first person since Muhammad Salih in 1991 to gain more than 5% as a highest-performing non incumbent in the presidential vote.

== Electoral history ==
=== Presidential elections ===
Election	Candidate	Votes	%	Votes	%	Result
Election	Candidate	First round		Second round		Result
1991	Islam Karimov	8,514,136	87.14	—	—	Elected ✓
2000	Abdulhafiz Jalolov	505,161	4.34	—	—	Lost ✗
2007	Asliddin Rustamov	468,064	3.27	—	—	Lost ✗
2015	Khatamjan Ketmanov	552,309	2.96	—	—	Lost ✗
2016	Khatamjan Ketmanov	669,187	3.80	—	—	Lost ✗
2021	Maqsuda Vorisova	1,075,016	6.65	—	—	Lost ✗
2023	Ulugbek Inoyatov	629,116	4.05	—	—	Lost ✗

=== Legislative Chamber elections ===
Election	Seats	+/–	Position
1994–95	69 / 250	New	▲2nd
1999	49 / 250	▼20	2nd
2004–05	28 / 120	▼21	2nd
2009–10	32 / 135	▲4	2nd
2014–15	27 / 150	▼5	▼3rd
2019–20	22 / 150	▼5	▼4th
2024	21 / 150	▼1	4th
