= 2021 Uzbek presidential election =

- 24 October 2021
- Registered: 20,158,907
- Turnout: 80.42% (▼7.31pp)
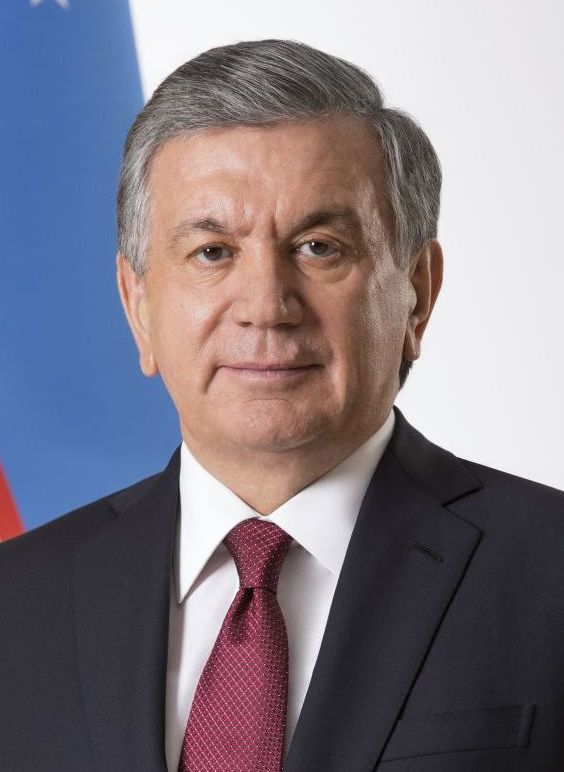

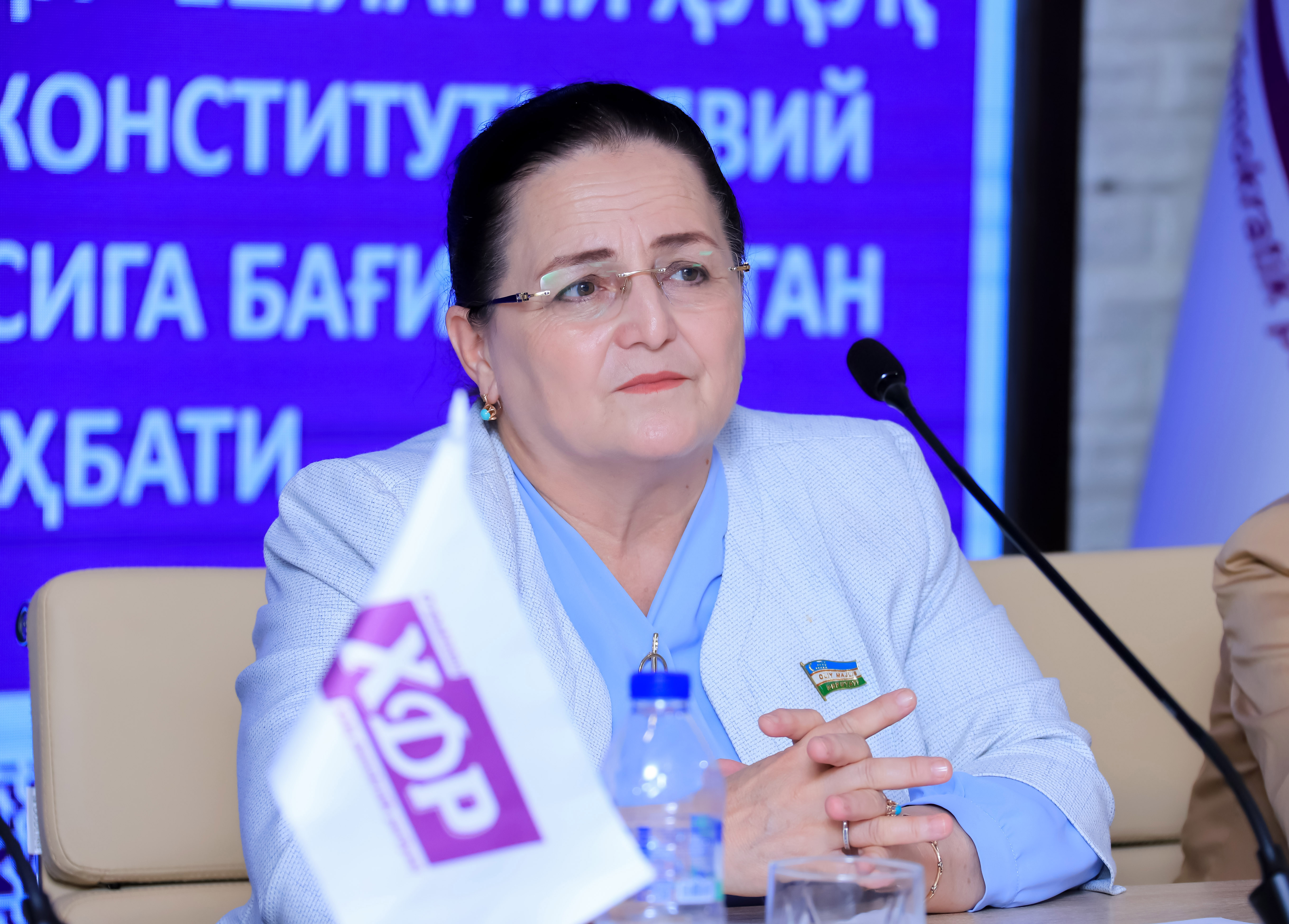

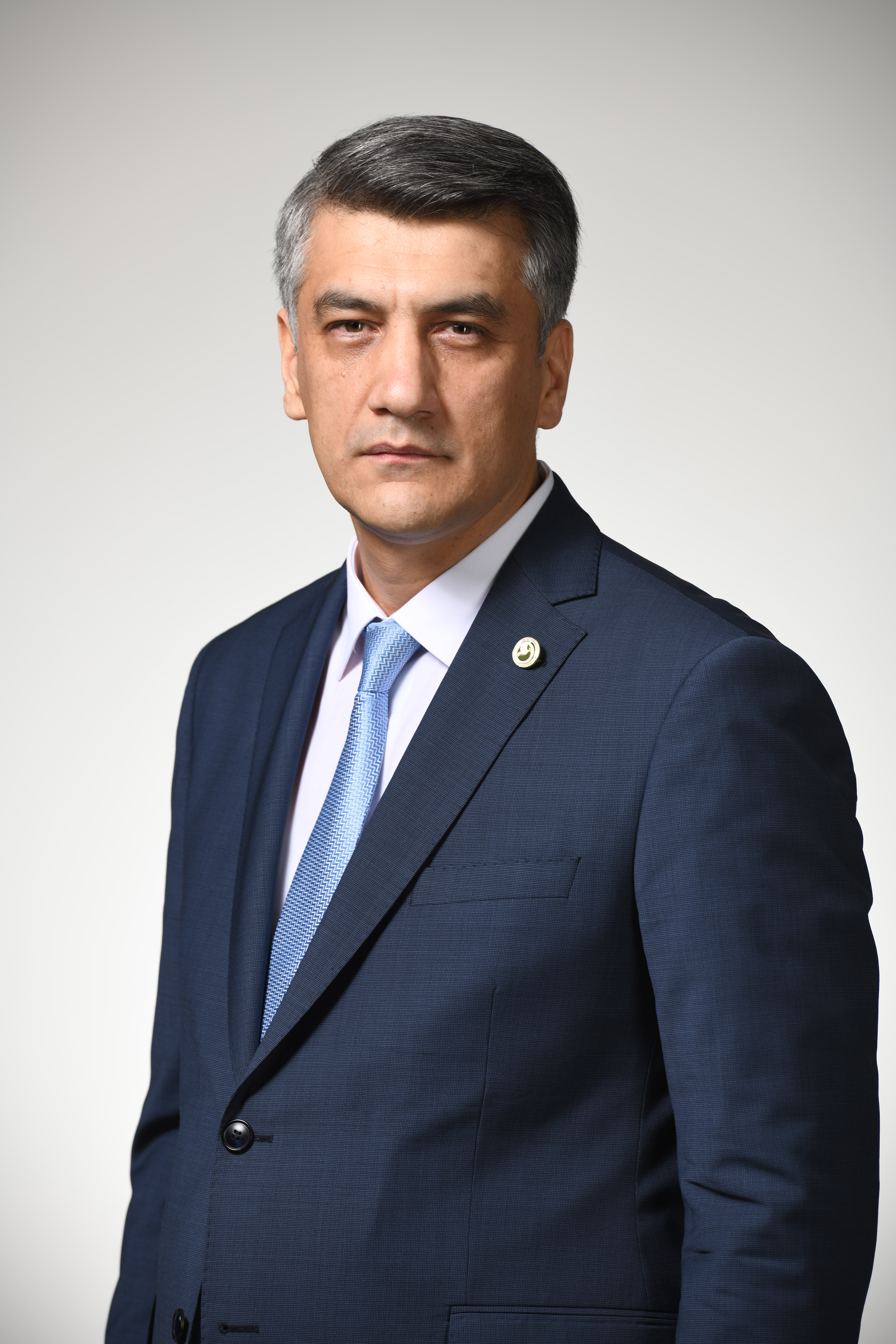
Nominee	Shavkat Mirziyoyev	Maqsuda Vorisova	Alisher Qodirov
Party	OʻzLiDeP	XDP	Milliy Tiklanish
Popular vote	12,988,964	1,075,016	888,515
Percentage	80.31%	6.65%	5.49%
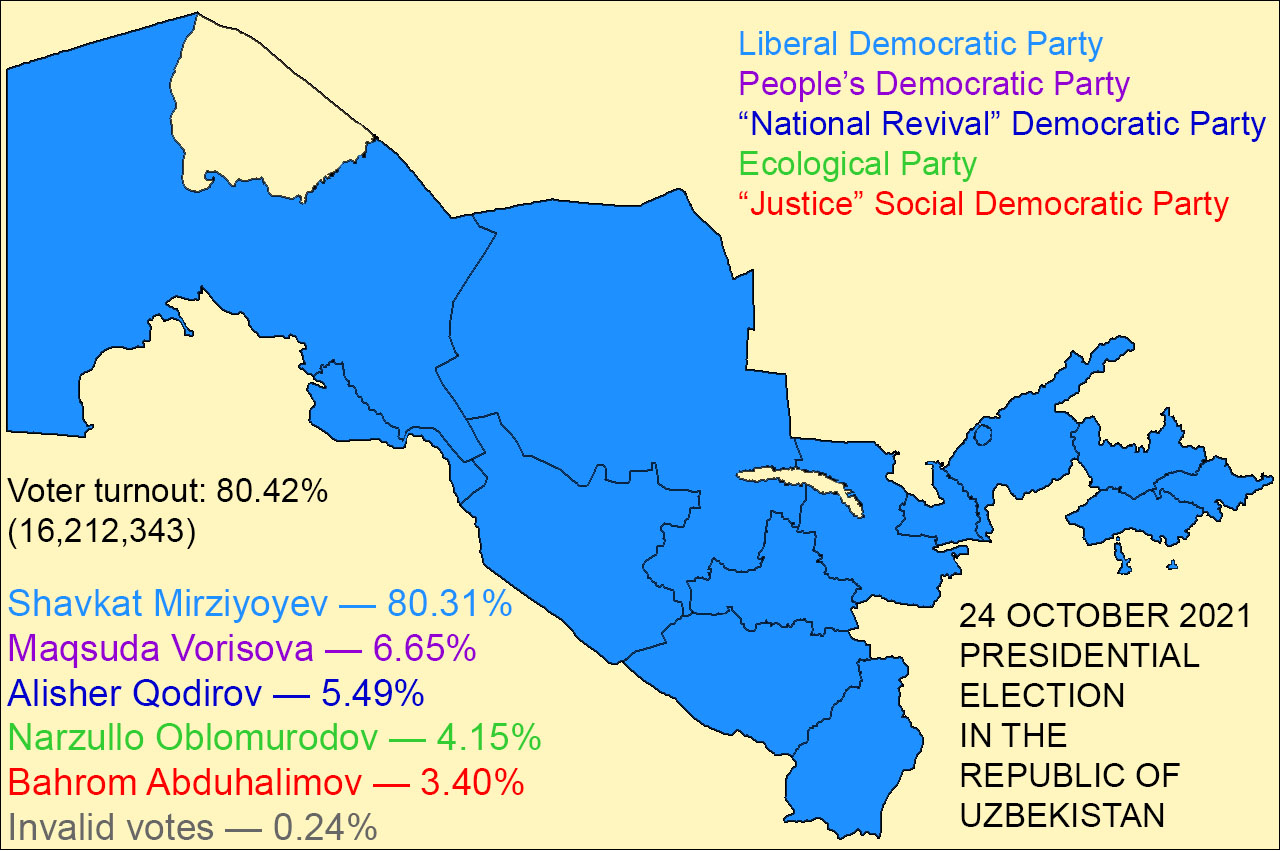
- Results by region
President before election
Shavkat Mirziyoyev
OʻzLiDeP
Elected President
Shavkat Mirziyoyev
OʻzLiDeP

Official election logo

Presidential elections were held in Uzbekistan on 24 October 2021. This was the sixth presidential election held since independence. Incumbent President Shavkat Mirziyoyev won a second term with a majority 80.1% of the vote, although faring the lowest performance for an incumbent in terms of vote share since 1991. Maqsuda Vorisova from the People's Democratic Party of Uzbekistan (XDP) was the runner-up and Alisher Qodirov from the Uzbekistan National Revival Democratic Party (Milliy Tiklanish) came third, which marked the first time that more than two candidates had officially received more than 5% of the vote.

Mirziyoyev was widely expected to win the official count by a large margin. Two prominent opposition figures had declared their intention to run against Mirziyoyev, but were repeatedly refused registration for their nominating parties by the authorities, with one of the candidates, celebrity singer Jahongir Otajonov, who was backed by the banned Erk Democratic Party (EDP), being withdrawn from the race due to apparent political intimidation. Khidirnazar Allakulov, a former rector, attempted to contest the race by creating his own political party named Truth and Progress Social Democratic Party (HTSDP) in the process which was denied registration as well, thus making him unqualified to run and leaving no opposition candidates to appear on the ballot.

In the aftermath of the election, the Organisation for Security and Co-operation in Europe (OSCE) issued a statement: "Despite recent welcoming reforms Uzbekistan's presidential election lacked genuine competition and significant procedural irregularities were noted on election day." Observers from the Commonwealth of Independent States (CIS) described the presidential election as "competitive, free, open and transparent."

Shavkat Mirziyoyev was inaugurated for his second term on 6 November. He was sworn in at the senate building at the joint session of the two chambers of the Parliament.

== Background ==
The previous presidential election was held in 2016, following the death of incumbent President Islam Karimov on 2 September of that year. The Constitution mandated that the election be held within three months of Karimov's death. Acting President Shavkat Mirziyoyev won the elections with 90% of the vote to which were described by international observers and media as a sham with a "lack of a genuine choice" among the presidential candidates. The last time an Uzbek president has faced a serious challenger in an election was in 1991, the year of the country's independence.

Under Mirziyoyev, Uzbekistan's political system has continued to be tightly controlled. Mirziyoyev was eligible under the country's constitution to serve a second term, and was considered likely to be reelected, as according to Farkhod Tolipov, founder of the Uzbek non-governmental research organisation Caravan of Knowledge, there is not "any alternative to him to challenge during the next elections". While a variety of parties ran in the 2019–20 parliamentary election, all of them were considered to be loyal to the government. In May 2020, the Uzbek government announced reforms to 'liberalise' its media and electoral laws. It has also claimed that it will ease campaign finance regulations and allow private donations. Mirziyoyev published a draft decree proposing constitutional amendments to replace the then-current majoritarian system for parliamentary elections with a "mixed system that includes some proportional representation".

In November 2020, a delegation led by Uzbek Foreign Minister Abdulaziz Kamilov visited the United States "looking to strengthen" its strategic relationship with Uzbekistan, described as the "key regional power broker". The meetings resulted in US$100 million being given to Uzbekistan for economic assistance, and the US pledging support for Uzbekistan's appointment to the United Nations Human Rights Council.

Tolipov in December 2020 said that "despite obvious advancement in reforms in various spheres, one direction of reforms remains very slow: it is the sphere of political reforms". Some reforms had been implemented; Parliament's visibility had been "slightly increased", and fragments of Parliamentary sessions were more often accessible to the public. However, MPs continued to vote unanimously on issues like the appointment of provincial governors, without attempts at debate or pluralistic decision-making.

While the Uzbek government's May 2020 announcement promised "liberalisation" of media laws, claiming it would no longer use libel and slander laws to imprison journalists and bloggers who criticized it, the Agency of Information and Mass Communications continued to revoke media licenses well into November 2020. The agency claimed in a 27 November statement that, while it was committed to "guaranteeing freedom of speech", the only way to ensure that freedom was by preventing people from saying anything the government deemed to be "false"; the revocations of media licenses were therefore supposedly due to misinformation and disinformation, such as disagreeing with the Uzbek government's claims about COVID-19 statistics. Furthermore, a website had allegedly "presented" the opinions of individual Uzbek Internet users as "public opinion", which was forbidden. This decision created public and media outrage; the United States embassy in Tashkent said it was "disappointed" by the agency's actions; Daniel Rosenblum, U.S. Ambassador to Uzbekistan, said that "to succeed, Uzbekistan's ambitious reforms require a free & open press. AIMC pressure not consistent with this". The agency, started in 2018 by the president's former press secretary Komil Allomjonov, initially removed many restrictions on what type of posts could be made online in Uzbekistan; however, Allomjonov's successor, Asadjon Khodjaev, is "widely viewed as a representative of an old guard that aims to slow or stall reforms."

On 8 February 2021, Mirziyoyev signed a bill, approved by the Parliament, to move the election day from December to 24 October 2021.

== Electoral system ==
The President of Uzbekistan is elected using the two-round system, with a run-off election between the two highest-placed candidates held if no candidate receives an absolute majority of the vote in the first round. The Organization for Security and Co-operation in Europe (OSCE)'s Office for Democratic Institutions and Human Rights (ODIHR), which observed the 2016 elections, reported that the elections lacked real competition because the ruling party was in a much stronger position, and due to limitations on certain freedoms, such as the right for media to report on politics in an unrestricted manner. Other irregularities reported by the OSCE include ballot stuffing and improper proxy voting.

== Candidates ==
Officially, a political party has the right to nominate a candidate for presidency on the condition that it is registered by the Ministry of Justice no later than four months before the day of the announcement of the start of the election campaign and six months before election date.

Nominations are reserved towards the highest bodies of political parties, and one party can nominate only one candidate from amongst its members or a non-partisan person. Thus, independent and non-partisan candidates cannot legally nominate themselves, and this requires becoming a member of one of the officially registered parties and nominating only with the support and approval of the leadership of these parties. This paragraph is often criticised by experts, political scientists, international observers and organizations, as well as human rights defenders, opposition figures and dissidents for systemically limiting access to any participant willing to bid for presidency.

As of June 2021, there were only five political parties officially registered in Uzbekistan, all viewed as pro-government: Uzbekistan Liberal Democratic Party, Uzbekistan National Revival Democratic Party, Justice Social Democratic Party, People's Democratic Party and the Ecological Party.

=== Registered ===
Candidates within the registered political party are required to collect at least 1% (or 212,000) of signatures of the total number of electorate. Article 38 of the Electoral Code allows for voters to sign for the support of one or more presidential nominees while Article 39 gives the CEC the functions in checking the signature lists within five days with minimum of 15% being subjected for verification.

Candidate name and age, political party		Political office(s)	Campaign logo	Details	Registration date
Narzullo Oblomurodov (46); Ecological Party		Leader of the Ecological Party of Uzbekistan (since 2021); First Deputy Chairman of the State Committee for Ecology and Environmental Protection (from 2020)	Logo of Narzullo Oblomurdov	Prior before working in environmental-issue related fields, Oblomurodov served in several state positions at local and national levels until becoming the First Deputy Chairman of the State Committee for Ecology and Environmental Protection in April 2020. In February 2021, he headed the Ecological Party, succeeding Komiljon Tojiboyev who led the party for brief period.	11 September 2021
Alisher Qodirov (46); Milliy Tiklanish		Member of the Legislative Chamber (since 2014); Leader of the Uzbekistan National Revival Democratic Party (since 2019) Other offices: Deputy Speaker of the Legislative Chamber since 2019	Logo of Alisher Qodirov	Qodirov has been leader of the second-largest party in Uzbekistan's lower house since 2019. The Millily Tiklanish party is supportive of the Uzbek government and of President Mirziyoyev. In June, Qodirov suggested that LGBT people should be deprived of Uzbek citizenship and deported, in order to solve the national conversation on LGBT issues.	11 September 2021
Bahrom Abduhalimov (62); ASDP		Chairman of the Justice Social Democratic Party Political Council (since 2020) Other offices: Vice President of the Academy of Sciences of Uzbekistan from 2017; State Adviser to the President for Interethnic Relations and Religious Affairs from 2006 to 2008	Logo of Bahrom Abduhalimov	Abduhalimov specialises in scientific research and studies. Serving in various educational institutions within Uzbekistan, he rose in the leading ranks, eventually becoming the Vice President of the Academy of Sciences of Uzbekistan in 2017. Abduhalimov became the head of the centre-left Justice party in October 2020, after his predecessor Nariman Umarov was appointed as a Senator by President Mirziyoyev.	14 September 2021
Shavkat Mirziyoyev (64); O'zLiDeP		President of Uzbekistan (incumbent, since 2016); Prime Minister of Uzbekistan (2003–2016)	Logo of Shavkat Mirziyoyev	Mirziyoyev was widely viewed to be one of the main and obvious candidates in the elections. A number of Uzbek opposition figures and dissidents opposed the potential nomination of Mirziyoyev. Amongst them were Muhammad Salih, Abdurahim Pulat, Jahangir Muhammad and the scholar-economist Khidirnazar Allakulov. After Mirziyoyev publicly expressed his support for amendments to the Russian Constitution in June 2020, many experts feared that Mirziyoyev would follow Russian President Vladimir Putin's path and initiate reforms and amendments to the Constitution in order to serve as president for life similarly like his predecessor Islam Karimov by resetting his previous term as the Constitution limits for the president to serve two terms only. In March 2021, it was reported that a Russian film company Masterskaya, which filmed a series of pro-Putin documentaries prior to, was hired to shoot a movie about Mirziyoyev ahead of the presidential polls that premiered on 1 September 2021 to coincide with the 30th anniversary of Uzbekistan's Independence Day.	14 September 2021
Maqsuda Vorisova (60); People's Democratic Party	Logo of Maqsuda Vorisova	Member of the Legislative Chamber (since 2019); Deputy Chairwoman of the People's Democratic Party of Uzbekistan Central Council (since 2018) Other offices: Member of the Tashkent Regional Kengash and Senator for Tashkent Region from 2015 to 2019; Member of the Zangiata District Kengash of People's Deputies from 2009 to 2014	Logo of Maqsuda Vorisova	Originally having a career as therapist and leading medical centers and polyclinics, specifically in rural areas. While working, Vorisova from there joined politics as a local district councillor to eventually being elected in 2019 as a Legislative Chamber MP for the People's Democratic Party.	14 September 2021

=== Disqualified ===
==== Khidirnazar Allakulov ====
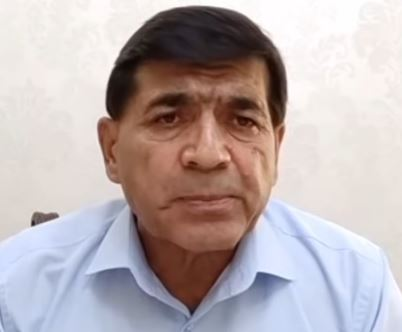
Khidirnazar Allakulov (65)
Leader of the Truth and Progress Social Democratic Party
(since 2021)
Rector of the Termez State University
(2002–2004)

In May 2020, Khidirnazar Allakulov expressed his desire to participate in the presidential elections, sharply criticising the results of Mirziyoyev's first term. In his opinion, the potential reforms in the country have been stopped and its reverse is being "tightened", the problems of poverty and unemployment have not been resolved, the fight against corruption is not yielding results, and Uzbekistan has accumulated over $25 billion in foreign debt, and a growing nepotism revolving around Mirziyoyev's family has appeared.

In March 2021, Allakulov initiated the creation of the opposition Truth and Progress Social Democratic Party (HTSDP). However, the party has repeatedly been denied registration by the authorities, with the official reasons being that the party's documents are not in order and that the party has not collected enough signatures. Despite the party testifying that they had collected 25,000 signatures, the authorities claimed that only 9,873 had been collected. The refusal to register opposition groups on account of their 'lack of signatures' is a common tactic employed by the authorities to restrict opposition. Significant political pressure has been placed on Allakulov and his party. Allakulov was accosted in his apartment building by a mob of people in April, and afterwards was fined for 'libel' after the crowd filed a lawsuit against him. Law enforcement officials have allegedly been holding meetings with university students to insist that they should not join new parties, specifically the opposition HTSDP and Erk parties, because they were "spreading destructive misinformation".

==== Jahongir Otajonov ====
In January 2021, Jahongir Otajonov on his Instagram page announced his interest in participating in politics by bidding for the presidency, similarly to Ukrainian president Volodymyr Zelenskyy's fate. He later announced that he had joined the People's Interests Democratic Party, a centre-right political party that was in the process of being formed. At the founding congress of the party which was held at Otajonov's home, unknown female provocateurs broke into his house and began to behave aggressively, shouting and accusing the singer and those present of being in the drug trade in maintaining a brothel, resulting in the constituent congress of the party being put off. Subsequent efforts of the party activists received fierce opposition from the Uzbek security forces and provocateurs. After increasing political pressure and harassment on Otajonov, he left Tashkent by settling in Istanbul, Turkey, where he lived prior and did business for several years during Islam Karimov's presidency. From there, he began criticising the former and current leadership of Uzbekistan by drawing attention on the scale of corruption, nepotism and embezzlement within the country, to the depressing standard of living of ordinary citizens. Otajonov also pledged that if he came to power, then he'd end Karimov's legacy by demolishing monuments across the country dedicated to him. At the end of March 2021, a group of unknown persons visited Otajonov's office in Istanbul, threatening to "beat and punish him well".

Otajonov in early April posted joint photos on Facebook with the former 1991 presidential nominee, dissident, leader of the Erk Democratic Party and the People's Movement of Uzbekistan Muhammad Salih. He also announced that he had left the People's Interests party and became a member of the unregistered and banned Erk party. After that, a video message from Otajonov's mother appeared on social media, where she pledged for him to leave his political ambitions behind and not become "a traitor to the Motherland” by cooperating with Salih in which she referred him as "the villain and enemy of the people." As a result, speculations arose that Otajonov's mother during the recording was allegedly reading from a pre-written script supposedly given by the Uzbek security forces. In May 2021, Otajnov returned to Uzbekistan where he pledged to start up activities of the banned Erk party and to contest the presidential race. While campaigning, unknown and uninvited individuals showed up at Erk party public meetings and at Otajonov's home, disturbing proceedings and calling for him to quit politics. His vehicle was also impounded by police, and when he complained about this on his Instagram page, police started an investigation into whether his comments constituted an "insult". After being attacked in the stairwell of his apartments, Otajonov was also sued after his public complaints were found to have "insulted the honour and dignity" of the attackers.

On 10 July 2021, Otajonov announced that he was withdrawing from the election after enduring numerous attacks. In a post on his Instagram page, Otajonov said that the stresses on his family were too much, commenting: "What's the point of being a president if something bad happens to them?". Two days after he published his statement, the post was removed for unknown reasons. It was not clear whether Otajonov had removed it or whether Uzbek authorities had blocked it to avoid speculation about pressure being placed on him. In any case, Otajonov's party Erk has as of yet still been denied official registration by the Uzbek authorities, with the official reason given for this being that the party's documents were "incomplete" or that not all of its signatures were valid. This is a commonly used tactic for the authorities to repress political opposition.

=== Nominations ===
==== Ecological Party of Uzbekistan (O'EP) ====
The Ecological Party of Uzbekistan (O'EP) held its Extraordinary Plenum on 4 August 2021, becoming the first party in the election to do so, in which the O'EP's Central Apparatus Executive Committee chairman Narzullo Oblomurodov was put forward as the candidate. It was noted at the party's plenum that it would aim at solving the environmental problems in the campaign race by attracting public attention, offering solutions, and protection of public health by ensuring a wellbeing quality of life.

On 27 August, Oblomurodov unveiled his election platforms which consisted of paying great attention towards issues in regards to environment and finding solutions as well as improving the "ecological culture" of the population. In an interview to Upl.uz, Oblomurodov stated that the O'EP willingly chose to participate in the presidential elections "with dignity", saying that the party would have only opted out of the race, if it had not been confident in its abilities.

The Ecological Party of Uzbekistan (O'EP) is a pro-government party.

==== Justice Social Democratic Party (ASDP) ====
On 5 August 2021, the Justice Social Democratic Party (ASDP) held a meeting from where the party chairman Bahrom Abduhalimov was presented as the presidential nominee.

Abduhalimov, on 9 September 2021, was unanimously elected as the candidate for presidency by the ASDP delegates at the 10th Ordinary Congress along with his election platforms being approved. At the congress, the party prompted for its activists to bring forwards the details of Abduhalimov's electoral programmes to the "consciousness of the people" is an urgently manner.

The Justice Social Democratic Party (ASDP) is a pro-government party.

==== Uzbekistan National Revival Democratic Party (MT) ====
The Uzbekistan National Revival Democratic Party (Milliy Tiklanish) at the 6 August 2021 plenum presented party chairman Alisher Qodirov as a candidate. From there, Qodirov stated that he would participate as a way to "make a worthy contribution to the development of Uzbekistan", outlining his vision of the country being list of developed country and to improve wellbeing of its citizens.

On 26 August, Qodirov at the 7th Milliy Tiklanish Ordinary Congress was officially nominated by the party after garnering majority of delegate vote. From there, he presented his campaign programme under slogan of Development on the basis of national values! (Uzbek: Milliy qadriyatlar asosida rivojlanish!) which consisted of five priority areas in focusing on the "formation of a national system of upbringing and education on the basis of national and universal values". After unveiling his platforms, Qodirov received backlash from the Justice Social Democratic Party, accusing him of plagiarising theses from the party's programme that was approved prior in 2019 in a statement and called upon Qodirov and the Milliy Tiklanish to be more aware about other rivaling parties' platforms.

The Uzbekistan National Revival Democratic Party is a pro-government party.

==== Uzbekistan Liberal Democratic Party (O'zLiDeP) ====
At the Uzbekistan Liberal Democratic Party (O'zLiDeP) Political Council meeting held on 7 August 2021, a decision was adopted in the participation of the presidential election in which the party proposed to nominate incumbent President Shavkat Mirziyoyev for the race.

The 10th OzLiDeP Ordinary Congress was held on 9 September 2021 which was attended by around 1,200 party delegates. From there Mirziyoyev accepted the nomination offer by the party to run for another term, pledging to continue in implementing political reforms and solves issues such as combatting poverty, increasing the GDP and salaries for kindergarten staff, reducing public debt, and allowing for the direct elections of hokims (local heads) in which the party members at the congress praised the already existing current policies which were enacted by Mirziyoyev in his first five years as a president. In an interview to BBC, First Deputy Chairman of the Uzbek Senate Sodiq Safoyev admitted that Mirziyoyev faced no serious contenders in the race, citing due to his "high authority" in which he gained traction after setting off political reforms since taking office, although asserted the need of the creation in "legal and organisational opportunities to form an internal opposition in a natural form."

The Uzbekistan Liberal Democratic Party (O'zLiDeP) is a pro-government party.

==== People's Democratic Party of Uzbekistan (XDP) ====
On 7 August 2021, the 4th People's Democratic Party Ordinary Plenum was held where the XDP Central Council's deputy chairwoman Maqsuda Vorisova was nominated for presidency, making her the first woman since Diloram Tashmukhamedova in 2007 to bid in a presidential race. Serving as a Legislative Chamber MP, Vorisova proclaimed herself as an "ordinary mother and woman" who has knowledge "about the problems of the people from the inside" and that in case of victory, she would put forward in solving issues regarding education and medicine.

At the 12th People's Democratic Party Ordinary Congress held on 6 September 2021, Vorisova was unanimously approved as a presidential nominee as well as the drafted pre-election programme which aims at building an Uzbek state and society that meets the criteria of "social equality and people’s democracy".

The People's Democratic Party of Uzbekistan (XDP) is a pro-government party.

==== Attempted ====
===== Erk Democratic Party (EDP) =====
On 26 May 2021, the unregistered and banned Erk Democratic Party (EDP) for the first time since 1991 nominated a candidate, celebrity singer Jahongir Otajonov, for the presidency at its congress. During the party nomination, around 20 estimated group of unknown persons broke into Otajonov's home of where the congress was behind held in Tashkent, shouting and insulting Otajonov. According to Otajonov himself in an interview, he stated that the incident happened unexpectedly and that the intriguers had thrown eggs around the house and had broken the video camera of blogger who was with Otajonov that was estimated to be worth thousand dollars. Following the attacks, the Erk party accused President Mirziyoyev and the security forces on staging the incident. The event was reportedly to have been occurred subsequently at the same time with the opening of the OSCE Office for Democratic Institutions and Human Rights (ODIHR) mission in the country. Party leader Muhammad Salih blamed the Uzbek authorities for the provocative attack, referring the unidentified disruptors as "Mirziyoyev's mob", due to his own fear of the Erk party with a commitment in losing his own reputation by the OSCE.

On 15 June 2021, the EDP's activists were summoned for questioning by the Tashkent police where presidential nominee Otajonov was interrogated for four hours. From there, he criticised the authorities' unwillingness by the law enforcement to bring charges against the disruptors during the nomination process.

On 10 July 2021, Otajonov announced that he would be withdrawing from the race after facing numerous attacks. In a post on his Instagram page, Otajonov said that the stresses on his family were too much, commenting "What's the point of being a president if something bad happens to them?". Two days after he published his post, the post was removed for unknown reasons. It was not clear whether Otajonov had removed it or whether Uzbek authorities had blocked it to avoid speculation about political pressure being placed on him.

In the aftermath of Otajonov's end in his presidential bid, the EDP published statement on 9 August 2021 to which it called for a boycott in the polls, describing it as "another show off" by Mirziyoyev with Salih not ruling out that the other contestants themselves in the race would end up casting their votes for Mirziyoyev, pointing out as other presidential candidates in past elections had done so for Islam Karimov.

== Campaign ==
=== Shavkat Mirziyoyev ===
On the basis of election platform, Mirziyoyev campaigned for an economy that would work on scientific and innovational function, reduction in poverty by providing an active business and financial support, increasing agriculture efficiency, providing high quality of education, improvements in healthcare, balanced regional development, continuing in implementing democratic, humanist, judicial reforms, tasking national security and active foreign policy, and the development in the spheres of culture and spirituality.

On 21 September 2021, Mirziyoyev began his campaign by visiting the capital of Nukus in the autonomous republic of Karakalpakstan. From there he attended a mausoleum, erected under Mirziyoyev's ordinance, as tribute to late Uzbek politician Musa Yerniyazov who had died a year prior from COVID-19.

=== Maqsuda Vorisova ===
Vorisova proposed a series of egalitarian and social priorities in spheres to living standards, justice and equality, and democracy. In her programme, she called for stronger social policies for the interests of population, economic sectors, high-quality food and consumer goods, housing and utility accessibility, equal access to high quality public institutions by implementing universal health care and free education that would be provided for all segments of the population, encouragement of a direct civic participation, development of human rights and ensuring social stability, and a more active engagement in foreign affairs by strengthening relations specifically with the Commonwealth of Independent States. According to the Podrobno.uz, Vorisova's proposals were described to be correlating with the existing Nordic model.

=== Alisher Qodirov ===
As candidate, Qodirov pledged for a serious of reforms and changes in educational spheres, public administration, economy, social justice and civil liberties, accelerated process for joining the World Trade Organization as well as closer economic and political ties with Central Asian countries, including Afghanistan.

Qodirov began his first campaign trip to Samarqand on 20 September 2021, citing the city as a "cradle of science and traditions" and from there, visited the Hazrat Khizr Mosque and paid tribute to late president Islam Karimov's grave. In the evening of that day, Qodirov concluded his visit by holding a political rally in the Registan Square.

During his campaign trail, Qodirov raised eyebrows as he called for income taxes for Uzbek migrants residing outside the country, arguing that it should be done so for the benefit of Uzbekistan's development. In response to Qodirov's remarks, the Uzbek State Tax Committee asserted that there were no considerations in implementing the newly proposed tax law while President Mirziyoyev during a meeting with voters in Tashkent Region attacked the tax proposal, calling it "absolutely wrong."

=== Bahrom Abduhalimov ===
Abduhalimov's platforms consisted of several varying changes in spheres of state body structures, science and education, income gap, social net, public health, and price controls. Such these were in proposing a formation of lawmaking and public control over local representative bodies, fighting against crime, independent judicial system, safety net for low-income peoples, reduction cost of living, state funded coverage for two years in preschools and four-year higher education, decent pension, increase for scientific research, merging of all education related ministries into one, prevention of common diseases as well as reduction in mistrust and inflated cost of prescriptions.

=== Narzullo Oblomurodov ===
Being nominee for an environmentalist party, Oblomurodov campaigned on the issues mostly on green politics. He called for a sustainable economic development by furthering the transition towards green economy, implementation of policies aimed at ensuring environmental safety, environmental protection and the use of natural resources for the comfort towards population, tackling climate change and reducing the severity of the Aral Sea as well as improving living condition in the region hit hard by the disaster, improving the effectiveness of state reforms specifically targeted towards environmental protection with use of administrative and judicial resources, furthering the development in terms of healthcare, education, science and culture, and promoting international cooperation to ensure peace and stability within the Central Asia, not ruling out the strengthening ties with Afghanistan.

== Timetable ==
- In an attempt to ensure openness and transparency of the electoral process, and to improve Uzbekistan's performance in the Democracy Index, the Central Election Commission (CEC) set measures in conducting a three-stage training for the commission members in order to improve their performance.
  - 28 April – 6 May 2021: Preliminary stage of training seminars
  - 18–28 May 2021: Concept stage of training seminars
  - 7–23 June 2021: First stage of training seminars
  - 12 July – 8 August 2021: Second stage of training seminars
  - 16 August – 16 October 2021: Third stage of training seminars
- 23 July: Election campaign begins
- 29 July: Registration of the CEC political party representatives
- 30 July: Registration and accreditation of media representatives begin
- 9 August: Formation of electoral districts
- 14 August: Collection of signatures and registration of candidates begin
- 20 August to 9 September: Official nominations for candidates are held
- 14 September: Registration of candidates end and the accreditation of international observers begin
- 20 September: Beginning of public campaigning period
- 14 October: Deadline for accreditation of media representatives
- 14 October to 20 October: Early voting is held. A total of 203,204 people cast their votes.
- 23 October: Day of silence; campaigning is prohibited.
- 24 October: Election day; polls open from 8:00 local time and close at 20:00

== Controversy ==
=== Political violence and crackdown ===
In June 2021, the Radio Free Europe/Radio Liberty reported that several Uzbek university students were discouraged from joining opposition political parties Erk Democratic Party (EDP) and Truth and Progress Social Democratic Party (HTSDP) after alleged Uzbek police visits to campuses who informed students about the opposition movements about "misinforming the population with destructive ideas" with some going as far as being encouraged by the law enforcement to spread "negative information" regarding the opposition parties instead. HTSDP party leader Khidirnazar Allakulov acknowledged the case, accusing it as an attempt by the government to secure Mirziyoyev's post for second term due to growing public anger which forced the authorities to rely on youth intimidation for political gains.

Following days before the polls were set open, several critics and political activists including failed presidential nominee Jahongir Otajonov complained about increasing government infringement by being barred from leaving the country and homes, being summoned by police and to some extent having family members of the activists' mobile phones, internet and power being turned off in their homes. The RFE/RL staff members received numerous death threats online in which according to the broadcaster's communication managers that the two threats were found to be from accounts associated with users promoting the Uzbek government's policies related to armed forces to which the incident received condemned remarks from RFE/RL President Jamie Fly, calling the threats "disgusting" and urged the Uzbek authorities to immediately put an end on its intimidating tactics against independent media.

=== Internet censorship and blockages ===
In January 2021, President Shavkat Mirziyoyev signed amendments to the law "On personal data" into place which obliged for operators processing personal data of Uzbekistani citizens to be stored in the country. According to Uzbek officials, the intent for the law was to increase the Wi-Fi speed in Uzbekistan by "ten times". However, in contrast to the government critics, the purpose for the amendments were aimed at increasing control over internet users and the content posted on social media specifically political means. The Committee to Protect Journalists organisation condemned the newly implemented law and called for the Uzbek authorities to repeal the amendments, citing that it would "introduce prison sentences for crimes including insulting or defaming the president online and making online calls for 'mass disturbances,' and make it an offense to publish statements online that urge people to violate the law and threaten public order, or show 'disrespect' to the state."

On 2 July 2021, the State Inspectorate for Control in the Field of Informatization and Telecommunications (O'zkomnazorat) announced that several sites would be restricted until furthermore notice, due to alleged violations of the law which urged social media companies' servers operating within the country to store users' personal data. Prior before the announcement, the O'zkomnazorat issued warnings to companies such as Twitter, ByteDance, WeChat, VK and Skype of which were violating the provisions. As a result, internet disruptions were reported throughout Uzbekistan with users being unable to access certain social media sites. During the restricted period, the work has received mixed reactions from several Uzbek officials with the head (hokim) of Namangan Region Shavkat Abdurazakov during a conference urging young people in which he called them "spoiled" to read books and newspapers instead and communicate with their parents more saying that the social media ban should be in place for a month while Uzbekistan Liberal Democratic Party MP Rasul Kusherbayev criticised the O'zkomnazorat's restrictions as "a very ridiculous and absurd decision in the age of information."

== Debates ==
The National Television and Radio Company of Uzbekistan (MTRK) announced on 18 October 2021 that the presidential debates would be held the following day on 19 October between the candidates' representatives and would be shown live on the Oʻzbekiston 24 and O‘zbekiston channels, along with Yoshlar and Mahalla being broadcast in Russian, and Madaniyat va ma’rifat in English.

2021 Uzbek presidential election debates
Date	Organisers	P Present R Representative					
Date	Organisers	Oblomurodov	Vorisova	Mirziyoyev	Qodirov	Abduhalimov	Ref.
19 October 2021; 17:00 UTC+5	ATRK	R Mustafoqulov	R Abdullaeva	R Ikromov	R To'laboev	R Ziyoev	

== Conduct ==
The Organization for Security and Co-operation in Europe (OSCE) opened its mission on 15 September 2021 in the country headed by former Irish politician Eoghan Murphy to observe the election. In a preliminary report published on 8 October, the OSCE wrote that the electoral period had "no direct or meaningful engagement between contestants" and that in-person campaigning had been held at the community and district level, specifically through door-to-door canvassing and large rallies with presidential candidate supporters whilst withstanding COVID-19 guidelines, adding that no single issue dominating the campaign platforms. The OSCE noted the improvements in regards to media environment although pointing out many existing longstanding issues such as intimidation and harassment of journalists and bloggers, and a restrictive legal framework for the media as well as blockage of certain social media websites being in place since July 2021. The OSCE's decision in sending observers was met with mixed reaction by the opposition, with Khidirnazar Allakulov positively expressing to have many observers at the polls to see the public dissatisfaction while Muhammad Salih viewed it surprising, describing the move as "legalising today's unfree elections" by giving it legitimacy after deciding to send observers, suggesting that it should've not been done so as the election "is no different from the previous one."

=== Reported violations ===
During election day, OSCE observers had noted seeing unauthorized persons in several visited polling precincts by describing them in "interfering in the voting process", voter identification procedures not being uniformly applied with voter IDs being left unchecked and voters being added into a computerized data list that were numbered to be hundreds without verifying which paved way for a possibility in people casting their ballots multiple times as well as cases of identical voter signature lists. The observers had also described instances of witnessing ballot box stuffing including "bundles of ballots folded together" and the problems during the tabulation process at the District Election Commissions (DECs) in regards to organization and the transparency which reportedly had led into "overcrowding and tension or unrest in some DECs" and the election monitors unable to have clear view of the procedures or observe without being restricted.

== Results ==
Shortly after the polls closed, various international news outlets by then had already called the race for incumbent Shavkat Mirziyoyev before the official results were announced. The following day on 25 October, the CEC published its preliminary results, confirming Mirziyoyev's win of 80.1% vote share, noted to be lower than in the previous 2016 presidential election in which the Eurasianet described as "part of the authorities’ attempt to paint a picture of blossoming political pluralism" while according to Kristian Lasslett, professor at Ulster University, saw this as "choreographed concession to plurality" that would give foreign supporters more justifications in engaging with the Uzbek government by pointing out "positive changes" in regards to Mirziyoyev's reduced vote share.

The Euronews mistakenly reported that Mirziyoyev had garnered about 90% of the vote instead of the official 80%, to which the CEC in response denied the agency's reports, adding that the final results will be announced before the end of the October, as Article 97 of the Electoral Code requires that the commission take no more than 10 days after the elections to fully validate them.

Candidate	Party	Votes	%
Shavkat Mirziyoyev	Liberal Democratic Party	12,988,964	80.31
Maqsuda Vorisova	People's Democratic Party	1,075,016	6.65
Alisher Qodirov	National Revival Democratic Party	888,515	5.49
Narzullo Oblomurodov	Ecological Party	670,641	4.15
Bahrom Abduhalimov	Justice Social Democratic Party	549,766	3.40
Total		16,172,902	100.00
Valid votes		16,172,902	99.76
Invalid/blank votes		39,441	0.24
Total votes		16,212,343	100.00
Registered voters/turnout		20,158,907	80.42
Source: AKIpress, CEC

== Reactions ==
Following the election day, the Uzbekistan Liberal Democratic Party (O'zLiDeP) held a celebratory event at the Humo Ice Dome in Tashkent which were attended by the party's activists and supporters, watching the online broadcast of the CEC press conference which announced Shavkat Mirziyoyev as a winner in the race. From there, Mirziyoyev spoke to the crowd, thanking them for the support and trust given to him, pointing to his achievements done during his first term as president and praising the election being held on the "spirit of democracy, openly and publicly", not ruling out that the nation would continue its changing development path.

=== Observation teams ===
- Organization for Security and Co-operation in Europe: OSCE issued a statement: "The joint observation mission from the OSCE Office for Democratic Institutions and Human Rights (ODIHR), the OSCE Parliamentary Assembly (OSCE PA), and the European Parliament (EP), acknowledged that the legal framework has been through extensive reforms in recent years, and many of the changes were in line with previous recommendations. Nonetheless, observers noted that election legislation still has a number of deficiencies and does not yet fully comply with international standards for democratic elections. While fundamental human rights and freedoms are guaranteed by the constitution, they continue to be restricted by other legislation and are frequently not implemented in practice."
- Commonwealth of Independent States: Sergei Lebedev, head of the CIS monitoring mission, said: "The mission of observers from the Commonwealth of Independent States have made the conclusion that the election on 24 October was held in full compliance with the Constitution and the Electoral Code of Uzbekistan, was competitive, free, open and transparent, and met the generally recognized principles of democratic elections."

=== International ===
Just hours before the official winner of the election was declared, the state leaders of Russia, Belarus, and Kazakhstan had already then congratulated Mirziyoyev on his forecasted victory.

- Belarus: Alexander Lukashenko, the disputed authoritarian President of Belarus, in regards to Mirziyoyev's win expressed confidence that under his leadership, Uzbekistan would continue its growth steadily, bolstering its economic potential and positions in the international arena.
- China: In a phone call, President Xi Jinping congratulated Mirziyoyev upon being reelected, commenting that the results of the vote had once again demonstrated the broad support for the ongoing new developments in Uzbekistan domestically and in foreign affairs.
- India: Prime Minister Narendra Modi commented in his Twitter: "Heartiest congratulations to President Shavkat Mirziyoyev on his victory in the election. I am confident that India-Uzbekistan strategic partnership will continue to strengthen in your second term. My best wishes to you and the friendly people of Uzbekistan."
- Kazakhstan: In a telephone conversion, President Kassym-Jomart Tokayev congratulated Mirziyoyev in his reelection bid, stating that the "convincing victory of the Uzbek leader in the election once again demonstrated strong popular support for his strategic course." Former President Nursultan Nazarbayev had also send a message of congrats to Mirziyoyev, wishing him a great success in activities.
- Kyrgyzstan: President Sadyr Japarov expressed his congratulation towards Mirziyoyev by phone, wishing him upon good health, further success in responsible state activities, peace, and prosperity towards the fraternal people and nation of Uzbekistan.
- Pakistan: Prime Minister Imran Khan tweeted his congrats towards Mirziyoyev, calling it an "impressive victory" in which the people of Uzbekistan had reposed their trust in his leadership.
- Russia: President Vladimir Putin congratulated Mirziyoyev by phone and telegram, where wished him success in state activities, telling that the results of the vote fully confirmed high political authority, as well as support aimed at the socio-economic development of Uzbekistan and the protection of its interests in the international arena.
- Tajikistan: Following the election, President Emomali Rahmon in a phone call congratulated Mirziyoyev, wishing him prosperity. From there, both leaders discussed the strengthening of diplomatic relations between two nations as well the situations regarding Central Asia and Afghanistan.
- Turkey: President Recep Tayyip Erdoğan phoned Mirziyoyev upon his electoral win, telling that the results of the vote had once again shown "broad support by the population of the country for the ongoing course of reforms in the new Uzbekistan."
- Turkmenistan: President Gurbanguly Berdimuhamedow wished well to Mirziyoyev in his continued reforms and transformations aimed at modernizing Uzbekistan and increasing its international presence in a telephone call.
- United States: The U.S. Embassy in Uzbekistan in response to the elections issued a statement on 28 October, saying that "the overall lack of genuine pluralism and the existence of procedural irregularities meant that the election was not truly competitive", calling on the Uzbek government to carry out "all observation mission recommendations related to elections and the promotion of civil and political rights."
