= List of newspapers in Uzbekistan =

The National Press Center stated in January 2001 that there were 507 newspapers and 157 magazines published in Uzbek language or Russian language.

Below is a list of newspapers published in Uzbekistan.

- Khalq Sozi – Uzbek language newspaper
- Narodnoye Slovo – Russian language newspaper
- Novosti Uzbekistana – Russian language newspaper
- Pravda Vostoka – Russian language newspaper
- Samarkand – weekly newspaper
- Zerkalo XXI – Russian language newspaper
- Tashkentskaya Pravda – Russian language newspaper
- Milliy Tiklanish – Uzbek language newspaper
- Toshkent Khakikati – Uzbek language newspaper
- Kitob Dunyosi – Uzbek language newspaper
- XXI ASR – Uzbek language newspaper
- Qishloq Hayoti – Uzbek language newspaper
- Uzbekistan Today – English language newspaper
- Zhamiyat – Russian language newspaper
- Vecherniy Tashkent – Russian language newspaper
- Otdokhnem! – Russian language newspaper
- Sado – Russian language newspaper
- Darakchi – Russian language newspaper
- Kattaqo'rg'on Tongi – Uzbek language newspaper
- Samarkandskiy Vestnik – Russian language newspaper
- 7x7 – Uzbek language newspaper
- Ledi – Uzbek language newspaper
- Bekajon – Russian language newspaper
- Erudit – Russian language newspaper
- Zozh – Russian language newspaper
- Sugdiyona – Uzbek language newspaper
- Parvona – Russian language newspaper
