= Alisher Qodirov =

Uzbek politician (born 1975)

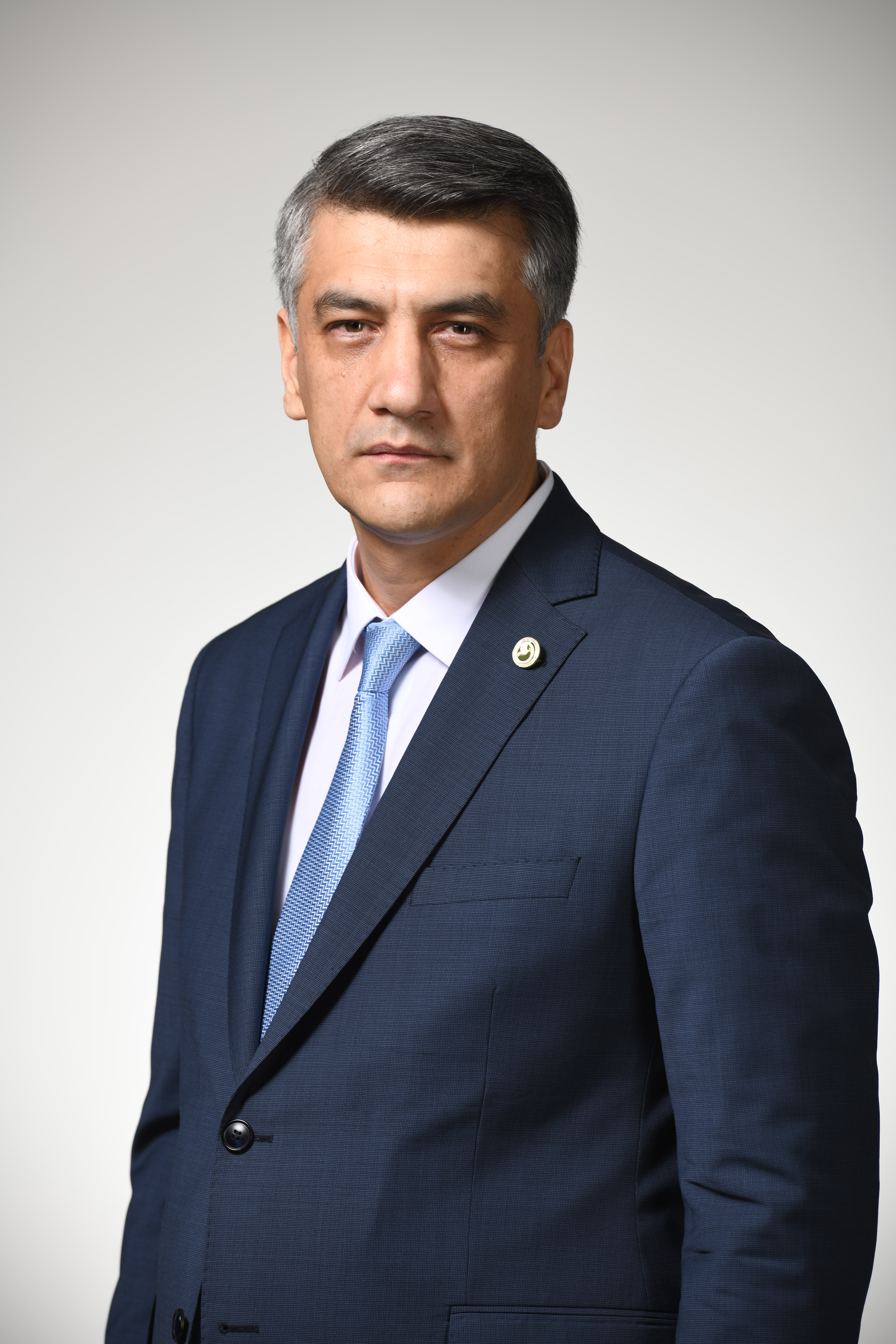
- Qodirov in 2021

Deputy Speaker of the Legislative Chamber
- Incumbent
- Assumed office 13 June 2019

Member of the Legislative Chamber
- Incumbent
- Assumed office 24 December 2014
- Constituency: Paxtakor (2019–present)

Leader of Uzbekistan National Revival Democratic Party
- Incumbent
- Assumed office 22 May 2019
- Preceded by: Sarvar Atamuradov

Personal details
- Born: 12 March 1975 (age 51) Tashkent, Uzbek SSR, Soviet Union
- Party: Milliy Tiklanish
- Children: 4
- Education: Ege University; Tashkent Financial Institute; Academy of Public Administration under the President of the Republic of Uzbekistan
- Profession: Philologist, economist

Alisher Keldiyevich Qodirov (born 12 March 1975) is a nationalist Uzbek politician serving as a member of the Legislative Chamber of Uzbekistan since 2015 and is the current leader of the right-wing Uzbekistan National Revival Democratic Party (Milliy Tiklanish) from 22 May 2019. He is known to have taken strong stances and made rhetoric statements against LGBT rights, the Russian language, and the legacy of the Soviet Union and Communism within Uzbekistan in politics.

He was the Milliy Tiklanish's nominee for the 2021 presidential elections where he ran on several platforms that were aimed at reforms and changes and faced serious of controversies and scandals in regards on proposals to introduce income taxes for Uzbek migrants as well as accusations in plagiarism. In spite of that, Qodirov won 5.5% of the vote share, taking third place in the race and becoming one of the front runners in the election. After presidential elections 2021 most of the people, even who are the members of other parties accepted him as a person who can change current political regime of Uzbekistan.

== Biography ==
=== Early life and career ===
Born in Tashkent, Qodirov attended the Ege University in İzmir, Turkey where he graduated in 1996 and then in 2009 from the Tashkent Financial Institute in absentia. In 2011, he completed his studies from the Academy of Public Administration under the President of the Republic of Uzbekistan. A philologist and economist by profession.

In 1996–1997, Qodirov worked as a leading specialist of the department of the Ministry for Foreign Economic Relations, Investments and Trade in the Jizzakh Region. Then from there, he worked at the In Management of State Property and Support for Entrepreneurship, eventually becoming the head of the Department for Foreign Economic Relations, Investments and Trade in the region.

=== Political career ===
==== Member of the Legislative Chamber ====
In the 2014–15 parliamentary elections, Qodirov was elected as an MP from the Milliy Tiklanish party where in 2017, he became a deputy of the Legislative Chamber Committee on Budgetary and Economic Reforms, as well as a member of the Committee on International Affairs and Inter-parliamentary Relations while also being the head of the Republican Center for Spirituality and Education. On 13 June 2019, he was elected as a Deputy Speaker of the Chamber.

During the COVID-19 pandemic, Qodirov supported the easing of quarantine restrictions telling that mortality of the virus are caused by unhealthy lifestyles and urged people to take care of their health by not overeating.

In April 2021, he proposed a bill that all appeals to the state bodies should be written in Uzbek to which it failed to pass. Qodirov in response to the parliamentary vote of rejecting the bill stated how Uzbek is an easy language to learn in regards to complaints by MPs about its difficulty, telling that "we'll come back to this question in 10 years if we're alive. In the meantime, sorry, our votes were not enough." stressing that the bill would've not discriminated anyone and that "such kindness should not be at the expense of discriminating against ourselves."

==== Leader of Milliy Tiklanish ====
On 22 May 2019, he was elected leader of the Milliy Tiklanish Democratic Party, replacing Sarvar Atamuradov.

==== 2021 presidential campaign ====
In the follow-up to the 2021 Uzbek presidential election, Qodirov was viewed to be the most likely candidate to be nominated by the Milliy Tiklanish. At the party's plenum held on 6 August 2021, Qodirov was named as the Milliy Tiklanish's presidential nominee. From there, he was accused of plagiarism by the centre-left Justice Social Democratic Party in regards to the platform's theses. During campaign, he ran in the issues in regarding education, public administration, economy, social justice and civil liberties where he called for series reforms and changes within them. Qodirov also proposed a controversial income taxes for Uzbek migrants living abroad which received opposition, most notably from his election challenger and incumbent President Shavkat Mirziyoyev.

In the aftermath of the race, Qodirov took third place amongst candidates, winning 5.5% of the vote and falling behind People's Democratic Party of Uzbekistan (XDP) nominee Maqsuda Vorisova despite the Milliy Tiklanish having more advantages due to its previous performance in the 2019–20 parliamentary elections. The Milliy Tiklanish nevertheless improved its performance and Qodirov became one of the runner ups in the election, taking more than 5% of the vote share along with Vorisova.

== Personal life ==
Qodirov is married and has four children. As an Uzbek Qodirov is also fluent in Russian, English and Turkish languages.
