= Elections in Uzbekistan =

Uzbekistan elects on the national level a head of state – the president – and a legislature. The president is elected for a five-year term by the people. The Supreme Assembly (Oliy Majlis) has 150 members in the Legislative Chamber, elected for a five-year terms and 100 members in the Senate; 84 members elected at the sessions of district, regional and city deputies, and 16 members appointed by the president. Most parties are excluded. Uzbekistan is a state dominated by the supporters of a head of state – the president. Opposition parties are allowed, but are widely considered to have no real chance of gaining power.

Uzbekistan had the highest voting age in the world, at 25. It has since been lowered to 18 in line with international norms.

== Latest elections ==
=== Presidential election ===
Uzbekistan’s President Shavkat Mirziyoyev was re-elected with 88% of the vote. The preliminary results of the presidential elections were announced at a briefing by the chairman of the Central Election Commission of Uzbekistan, Zainiddin Nizamkhojaev. More than 15 million voters participated in elections.

Candidate	Party	Votes	%
Shavkat Mirziyoyev	Independent	13,625,055	87.71
Robaxon Maxmudova	Justice Social Democratic Party	693,634	4.47
Ulugbek Inoyatov	People's Democratic Party	629,116	4.05
Abdushukur Xamzayev	Ecological Party of Uzbekistan	585,711	3.77
Total		15,533,516	100.00
Valid votes		15,533,516	99.25
Invalid/blank votes		117,889	0.75
Total votes		15,651,405	100.00
Registered voters/turnout		19,593,838	79.88
Source: CEC

=== Parliamentary election ===
Party	Proportional			Constituency			Total seats	+/–
Party	Votes	%	Seats	Votes	%	Seats	Total seats	+/–
Liberal Democratic Party	5,194,041	34.75	26			38	64	+11
Milliy Tiklanish	2,812,493	18.82	14			15	29	−7
People's Democratic Party	2,558,016	17.11	13			7	20	−2
Adolat SDP	2,420,857	16.20	12			9	21	−3
Ecological Party	1,960,764	13.12	10			6	16	+1
Total	14,946,171	100.00	75			75	150	0
Valid votes	14,946,171	99.46						
Invalid/blank votes	81,358	0.54						
Total votes	15,027,529	100.00						
Registered voters/turnout	19,944,859	75.35						
Source: MSK, MSK

== See also ==
- Electoral calendar
- Electoral system
- Censorship in Uzbekistan
