= Mass media in Uzbekistan =

Media in Uzbekistan is currently being censored to an extent. Although a government decree officially eliminated state censorship in 2002, it has continued to severely restrict independent journalism, particularly following the Andijan uprising of 2005. Licensing and regulation are controlled by the State Press Committee and the Inter-Agency Coordination Committee, which use their authority to harass, delay and obstruct the activities of independent media outlets. In late 2006, authorities further tightened state control by requiring re-registration by all media outlets that did not pass a summary review of qualifications. In 2005, some 30 to 40 independent television stations and seven independent radio stations were in operation, but four state-owned television stations, run by the Television and Radio Company of Uzbekistan, dominated the market. No live programming is allowed.

Total newspaper readership is estimated at only 50,000; the newspaper market is dominated by the state-owned papers Pravda Vostoka, Halq Sozi, and Narodnoye Slovo. The largest privately owned papers are Novosti Uzbekistana, Noviy Vek, Noviy Den, and Mohiyat. The state controls newspaper distribution and materials supply. In the early 2000s, newspaper articles occasionally criticized government policy and social conditions, but bribery of journalists was common.

The only national news agency, the Uzbekistan National News Agency, is state-controlled. Agence France-Presse (of France), Anadolu Ajansı (of Turkey), the Associated Press, Interfax (of Russia), and Reuters are foreign agencies with offices in Uzbekistan. The government forced Radio Free Europe–Radio Liberty to close its Tashkent office in late 2005. In early 2006, a new media law placed further restrictions on the activities of foreign news organizations in Uzbekistan.

== Censorship ==
In 2011, the flow of information coming out of the country remained tightly controlled by the authorities, although a few independent voices continued to report from inside Uzbekistan. The news website Uznews.net operated from 2006 to 2014. At the time, it was one of the few sources that still maintained a network of journalists covering day-to-day events in Uzbekistan.

Journalism in Uzbekistan remains a dangerous profession, and a number of reporters have been imprisoned for practising it. In 2011 alone, eleven journalists were imprisoned in Uzbekistan.

== Television ==
Television in Uzbekistan was first introduced in 1956 when the Uzbek SSR was part of the Soviet Union. The first national television channel was Oʻzbekiston, which was introduced at the beginning of transmission of Uzbekistan. Colour television was also introduced in the 1970s. Back then, Oʻzbekiston was the only TV channel and it broadcast several times a day. Uzbekistan's first private television channel, STV, started broadcasting on 15 May 1991.

In 2005, some 30 to 40 independent television stations were in operation, but four state-owned television stations, run by the Television and Radio Company of Uzbekistan, dominated the market. No live programming is allowed.

=== Digital ===
==== Uzdigital ====
Uzbekistan's first and leading digital platform launched in 2009. In 2013, high definition television in HD was launched on a commercial basis. Uzdigital recently launched its own HD channels, such as Zoʻr TV HD, MY5 HD, Sevimli HD, Kinoteatr HD, Milliy HD, and UzHD.

In September 2012, audiences had reached 1 million.

== See also ==
- Elections in Uzbekistan
- Telecommunications in Uzbekistan
