= Legislator =

Person who writes and passes laws

A legislator, or lawmaker, is a person who writes and passes laws, especially someone who is a member of a legislature. Legislators are often elected by the people, but they can be appointed, or hereditary. Legislatures may be supra-national (for example, the European Parliament), national, such as the Japanese Diet, sub-national as in provinces, or local.

== Overview ==
The political theory of the separation of powers requires legislators to be independent individuals from the members of the executive and the judiciary. Certain political systems adhere to this principle, others do not. In the United Kingdom and other countries using the Westminster system, for example, the executive is formed almost exclusively from legislators (members of the parliament), and the executive Cabinet itself has delegated legislative power.

In continental European jurisprudence and legal discussion, "the legislator" (le législateur) is the abstract entity that has produced the laws. When there is room for interpretation, the intent of the legislator will be questioned, and the court is directed to rule in the direction it judges to best fit the legislative intent, which can be difficult in the case of conflicting laws or constitutional provisions.

== Terminology ==
The local term for a legislator is usually a derivation of the local term for the relevant legislature. Typical examples include

- Parliament: member of parliament
- Assembly: member of the assembly
- Legislature: member of the legislature
- Congress: member of congress
- Chamber of Deputies: deputy
- Senate: senator
- House of Representatives: representative
- The generic term "deputy" may also be used, deriving from the concept that the legislator is "deputising" for the electorate of their electoral district.

=== By country ===
This is an incomplete list of terms for a national legislator:

Country	Title	Legislature
Algeria	نواب (Député)	People's National Assembly
Argentina	Diputado Nacional	Chamber of Deputies
Argentina	Senador	Senate
Argentina	Diputado provincial	Several provincial Chambers of Deputies
Belarus	Дэпутат (deputat)	House of Representatives
Belgium	Provincial executive member: Gedeputeerde (Dutch) / Député (French) / Deputierter (German)	Deputation / Provincial College (provincial executive body)
Belgium	In French, député is sometimes also used to denote a member of parliament.	Chamber of Representatives or a regional parliament
Bolivia	Diputado/Diputada	Chamber of Deputies
Brazil	Deputado estadual/distrital	Legislative Assemblies
Brazil	Deputado federal	Chamber of Deputies
Brazil	Senador	Federal Senate
Bulgaria	Депутат (Deputat)	National Assembly
Canada	Senator, Sénateur	Senate of Canada
Canada	Member of Parliament (MP) / Député	House of Commons of Canada
Chile	Diputado/Diputada	Chamber of Deputies
Chile	Senador/Senadora	Senate
China	Deputy (人大代表)	National People's Congress
Colombia	Diputado/Diputada	Departamental Assemblies
Costa Rica	Diputado/Diputada	Legislative Assembly
Denmark	Folketingsmedlem	Folketinget
Dominican Republic	Diputado/Diputada	Chamber of Deputies of the Dominican Republic
Ecuador	Asambleísta (before 2007, diputado)	National Assembly
El Salvador	Diputado/Diputada	Legislative Assembly
France	Député/Députée	National Assembly
France	Sénateur/Sénatrice	Senate
Germany	Abgeordnete/Abgeordneter	Bundestag, Landtag
Guatemala	Diputado/Diputada	Congress of the Republic
Guernsey	People's Deputy	States of Guernsey
Haiti	Député	Chamber of Deputies
Honduras	Diputado/Diputada	National Congress
India	Member of Parliament	Lok Sabha
Iran	مجلس شورای اسلامی	Islamic Consultative Assembly
Ireland	Senators / Seanadóirí	Seanad Éireann
Ireland	Teachta Dála (TD)	Dáil Éireann
Italy	Deputato	Chamber of Deputies
Jersey	Deputy	States Assembly
Kazakhstan	Депутат (deputat)	Parliament
Latvia	Deputāts	Saeima
Lebanon	Député/النواب (Nuwwab, or deputy)	Parliament
Luxembourg	Deputéierten / Député	Chamber of Deputies
Mexico	Diputado/Diputada	Chamber of Deputies
Netherlands	Gedeputeerde	Provincial executive (European Netherlands)
Netherlands	Eilandgedeputeerde	Bestuurscollege (Caribbean Netherlands)
Nicaragua	Diputado/Diputada	National Assembly
North Korea	Deputy (대의원; taeŭiwŏn)	Supreme People's Assembly
Panama	Diputado/Diputada	National Assembly
Paraguay	Diputado/Diputada	Chamber of Deputies
Poland	Poseł/Posłanka	Sejm
Poland	Senator/Senatorka	Senate
Portugal	Deputado	Assembly of the Republic
Romania	Deputat	Chamber of Deputies
Russia	Депутат (deputat)	State Duma and regional legislative bodies
Somalia	Deputy	Federal Parliament
Spain	Senador/Senadora	Senate
Spain	Diputado/Diputada	Congress of Deputies
Thailand	Senator (วุฒิสมาชิก; ส.ว.)	Senate
Thailand	Member of the H.R. (สมาชิกสภาผู้แทนราษฎร; ส.ส.)	House of Representatives
Ukraine	People's Deputy of Ukraine (Депутат)	Verkhovna Rada
United Kingdom	Lords Spiritual and Lords Temporal	House of Lords
United Kingdom	Member of Parliament (MP)	House of Commons
United States of America	Senator	Senate
United States of America	Representative; Congressperson	House of Representatives
Uzbekistan	Senator, Сенатор	Senate
Uzbekistan	Deputat, Депутат	Legislative Chamber
Uruguay	Diputado/Diputada	Chamber of Representatives
Venezuela	Diputado/Diputada	National Assembly
Vietnam	Đại biểu Quốc hội	National Assembly

== Substitute legislator ==
Some legislatures provide each legislator with an official "substitute legislator" (or "alternate") who deputises for the legislator in the legislature if the elected representative is unavailable. Venezuela, for example, provides for substitute legislators (diputado suplente) to be elected under Article 186 of its 1999 constitution. Ecuador, Panama, and the U.S. state of Idaho also have substitute legislators.

== See also ==
- List of legislatures by country
