= Ilgizar Sobirov =

Uzbek lawyer and politician (born 1959)

- Илгизар Собиров
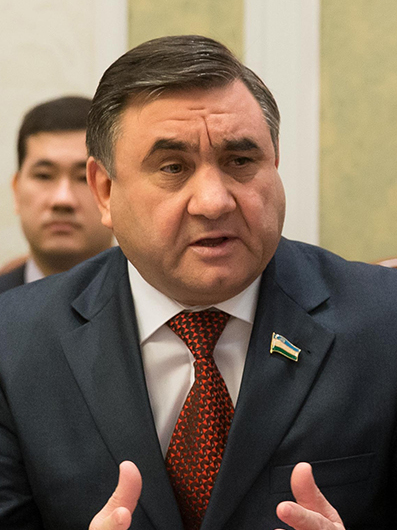
- Sobirov in 2013

Chairman of the Senate of Uzbekistan
- In office 24 February 2006 – 22 January 2015
- President: Islam Karimov
- Prime Minister: Shavkat Mirziyoyev
- Preceded by: Murat Sharifkhodjayev
- Succeeded by: Nigmatilla Yuldashev

Hokim of the Khorezm region
- In office 4 September 2017 – 21 April 2018
- President: Shavkat Mirziyoyev
- Prime Minister: Abdulla Aripov
- Preceded by: Pulat Bobojonov
- Succeeded by: Farhod Ermanov

Personal details
- Born: 20 February 1959 (age 67) Qoʻshkoʻpir District, Uzbek SSR, Soviet Union
- Party: Milliy Tiklanish
- Education: Tashkent State University

Ilgizar Matyakubovich Sobirov (Uzbek Cyrillic: Илгизар Матёқубович Собиров; born 20 February 1959) is an Uzbek lawyer and politician. He served as Chairman of the Senate of Uzbekistan from 2006 to 2015 under President Islam Karimov, and afterwards was Hokim of the Khorezm region from 2017 to 2018.

== Early life ==
Sobirov was born on 20 February 1959 in the Qoʻshkoʻpir District, which was then part of the Uzbek SSR in the Soviet Union. From 1975 to 1980 he worked in the collective farm named after I. Ibragimov in his native Qoʻshkoʻpir District. He then attended and graduated from the Faculty of Law at Tashkent State University, where he was the Secretary of the Komsomol organization there.

== Career ==
After graduating, he worked as an employee of the Department of Criminal Law and Criminology, then as a researcher at the Institute of Philosophy and Law of the Academy of Sciences of Uzbekistan. He then worked as a Senior Assistant to the then Chairman of the Supreme Court of Uzbekistan and as the Vice-Rector of the Faculty of Law at his alma mater from 1993 to 1994. He then worked with in some capacity to the Supreme Economic Court and to the Presidential Administration. For a year afterwards, he was the Head of the Department of Justice of the Khorezm Region. From 2000 to 2003 he served in the then unicameral parliament, Oliy Majlis, and was on the Committee on Defense and Security and on Legislation and Judicial Affairs.

He left the legislature in 2003 to become the Hokim (Governor) of the Qoʻshkoʻpir District for two years. In 2005, he was elected to the newly formed Senate following the reforms that created it representing the Qoʻshkoʻpir District. On 24 February 2006, on the recommendation of the President after Murat Sharifkhodjayev resigned from the position of Chairman of the Senate due to his deteroirating health, Sobirov was appointed the new Chairman.

During his terms as Chairman, he signed agreements of cooperation with Russia. He also expressed internet in joining the Russian-led Customs Union after a meeting a Russian delegation. However, this was contradicted later by Sodiq Safoyev, who said Uzbekistan would not join the organization and had not changed its position. In 2012, he pushed for rational use of water resources as opposed to a unilateral hydropower project, a view that would be reiterated by the president. In studies on if anybody was to succeed Karimov during this time, Sobirov was pointed out as a likely candidate, but his level of support has been uncertain. Most have viewed him, if he were to succeed, as a placeholder not to challenge the successor in a managed replacement election.

In 2015, he stepped down from the position, and was succeeded by Nigmatilla Yuldashev. He then worked as the Head of the Justice Department for the Khorezm Region. In accordance with Presidential Decree No. PF-5182 dated 4 September 2017 Sobirov was appointed Acting Hokim of the Khorezm Region. He was officially appointed Hokim on 14 October 2017. On 21 April 2018 he was dismissed from this post for health reasons.

Since 29 September 2018 he has been the Chairman of the District Criminal Court of Chilanzar, which is located in Tashkent.
