= 2016 Uzbek presidential election =

- 4 December 2016
- Registered: 20,461,805
- Turnout: 87.73% (▼3.35pp)
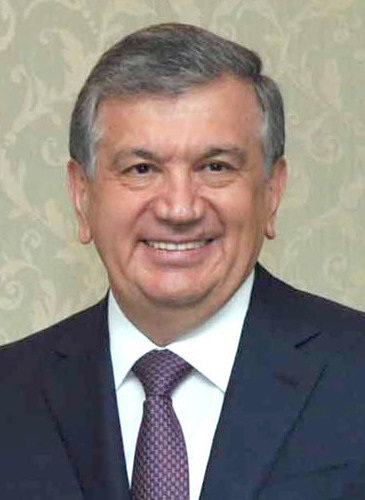

Nominee	Shavkat Mirziyoyev	Hotamjon Ketmonov
Party	OʻzLiDeP	XDP
Popular vote	15,906,724	669,187
Percentage	90.29%	3.80%
President before election
Shavkat Mirziyoyev (Interim)
OʻzLiDeP
Elected President
Shavkat Mirziyoyev
OʻzLiDeP

Snap presidential elections were held in Uzbekistan on 4 December 2016, following the death of incumbent President Islam Karimov on 2 September. The constitution mandated that the election be held within three months of Karimov's death. Interim President Shavkat Mirziyoyev won the elections with 90% of the vote. The elections were described by the Economist as a sham, and by the Organization for Security and Co-operation in Europe as lacking "a genuine choice".

== Background ==
According to article 96 of the constitution, when a president is incapacitated or dies in office, the Chairman of the Senate (Nigmatilla Yuldashev at the time of Karimov's death) should take over as acting President, before an election is held within three months. In the event, however, Yuldashev stood aside, and parliament on 8 September voted unanimously to appoint Prime Minister Shavkat Mirziyoyev as interim President.

This extra-constitutional measure was made with the support of regional clans, who feared that a power struggle between the country's elites would cause instability, and so decided to support Mirziyoyev, who had been Prime Minister since 2003. According to Reuters, Mirziyoyev's negotiations with the clans to secure the presidential nomination included a promise to share power with Deputy Prime Minister Rustam Azimov and national security chief Rustam Inoyatov.

== Electoral system ==
The President of Uzbekistan is elected using the two-round system, with a run-off election between the two highest-placed candidates held if no candidate receives an absolute majority of the vote in the first round.

== Campaign ==
The following four candidates were nominated by their respective parties in September. The CEC approved their applications in October.

- Shavkat Mirziyoyev, Prime Minister of Uzbekistan and interim president; Liberal Democratic Party of Uzbekistan nominee
- Sarvar Otamuradov, Uzbekistan National Revival Democratic Party nominee
- Narimon Umarov, Justice Social Democratic Party nominee
- Khatamjon Ketmonov, People's Democratic Party of Uzbekistan nominee

It was widely expected that Mirziyoyev, who was Prime Minister, interim president and the leader of Uzbekistan's largest party, the Liberal Democratic Party, would win the election. During the campaign, Mirziyoyev promised to mostly continue Karimov's policies, although he also pledged to implement populist measures such as forcing state bureaucrats and local leaders to be more responsive to the people's concerns, and to establish a hotline to the president. Mirziyoyev's platform primarily focused on economic issues, promising that he would double the GDP by 2030.

The other three nominees were from parties that were technically in opposition but have always supported the government's position. As in the 2015 presidential elections, the other candidates refrained from attacking other nominees and instead focused on their own pet topics. According to EurasiaNet, Ketmonov focused on disabled rights, Umarov focused on education, while Otamuratov focused on promoting patriotism and nationalism.

During the campaign, government-controlled media repeated the message that if the Karimov-era autocracy ended, the only alternatives were political chaos or Islamic extremism. Each candidate was allowed to erect 624 billboards across the country during the campaign, a decrease from the 829 billboards that had been allowed in the previous election.

== Conduct ==
The Organization for Security and Co-operation in Europe (OSCE)'s Office for Democratic Institutions and Human Rights (ODIHR), which observed the elections, reported that although it had been more transparent and in line with proper electoral procedure, the need for electoral reform still showed. The ODIHR reported that the elections lacked real competition because the ruling party was in a much stronger position and due to limitations on certain freedoms, such as the right for media to report on politics in an unrestricted manner. Other irregularities reported by the OSCE include ballot stuffing and improper proxy voting.

Based on the OSCE report, the Economist described the election as a sham and simply replacing "one strongman with another".

== Results ==
Candidate	Party	Votes	%
Shavkat Mirziyoyev	Liberal Democratic Party	15,906,724	90.29
Hotamjon Ketmonov	People's Democratic Party	669,187	3.80
Narimon Umarov	Justice Social Democratic Party	619,972	3.52
Sarvar Otamuradov	National Revival Democratic Party	421,055	2.39
Total		17,616,938	100.00
Valid votes		17,616,938	98.14
Invalid/blank votes		334,729	1.86
Total votes		17,951,667	100.00
Registered voters/turnout		20,461,805	87.73
Source: CEC

== Aftermath ==
According to Interfax, Vladimir Putin, who has a better relationship with Mirziyoyev than with Karimov, was the first leader to call the newly elected leader and sent a congratulatory note 20 minutes after the results were announced. According to the Kremlin, the two leaders "confirmed their commitment to further strengthening of Russian-Uzbek relations of alliance and strategic partnership" during a phone call and Putin invited Mirziyoyev to visit Russia.

Since Mirziyoyev had won the support of the regional clans by promising to share power with Rustam Azimov, the Deputy Prime Minister, and Rustam Inoyatov, who ran the national security apparatus, it was unclear how much power the newly elected president would actually wield. The Economist said that the real power in Uzbekistan may be in the hands of Inoyatov.
