= Hotamjon Ketmonov =

Uzbek politician (born 1969)

First Deputy Head of the State Inspectorate for Supervision of Education Quality
- Incumbent
- Assumed office 3 June 2019

Member of the Legislative Chamber
- In office 22 December 2014 – 25 December 2019
- Constituency: Boz 11th

Chairman of the People's Democratic Party
- In office 24 April 2013 – 1 June 2019
- Preceded by: Latif G'ulomov
- Succeeded by: Ulugʻbek Inoyatov

Personal details
- Born: 22 May 1969 (age 56) Baliqchi District, Uzbek SSR, Soviet Union
- Party: People's Democratic Party
- Children: 3
- Education: Andijan State Pedagogical University

Hotamjon Abdurahmonovich Ketmonov (born 22 May 1969) is an Uzbek politician who served as member of the Legislative Chamber from 2015 to 2019, and the chairman of the People's Democratic Party of Uzbekistan from 2013 to 2019, and candidate in the 2015 and 2016 Uzbek presidential election.

== Biography ==
Ketmenov was born in 1969 in the Baliqchi District of Andijan region.

In 1993, he graduated from the Andijan State Pedagogical Institute with a degree in Russian language and literature.

Ketmonov began his career as a teacher at a School #28 in the Tashlak district of the Ferghana region. From 1995 to 2004, he worked as a chief specialist, department head, deputy head of the Department of Public Education of the Ferghana Region. From 2004 to 2013, Ketmenov served as Deputy Hokim of Andijan region for public relations and religious organizations.

From 2013 to 2019, Ketmonov was the chairman of the Central Council of the People's Democratic Party of Uzbekistan (PDPU).

Following the results of the first round of 2014–15 Uzbek parliamentary election held on 21 December 2014, Ketmonov was elected as a member of the Legislative Chamber of the Oliy Majlis from the 11th Boz constituency. From January 2015, he was the parliamentary leader of the PDPU faction and the Deputy Speaker of the Legislative Chamber of the Oliy Majlis.

Ketmenov was a candidate in the 2015 Uzbek presidential election, where he won 2.9% of the vote.

On 17 September 2016, the Central Council of the PDPU nominated Ketmenov as a candidate in the 2016 snap presidential election which was held after the death of President Islam Karimov. Ketmenov came in 2nd place, winning 3.7% of the popular vote.
