= Muhammadusuf Teshabaev =

Uzbekistani politician

Muhammadyusuf Teshaboyev Mutalibjonovich (born 27 November 1954) is an Uzbekistani politician from the Uzbekistan Liberal Democratic Party. As leader, his party won a plurality of seats in the Legislative Chamber of Uzbekistan in the 2009–10 Uzbek parliamentary election.
