= Jahongir Otajonov =

Uzbek musician and politician

- Жаҳонгир Отажонов
- Born: 29 September 1978 (age 47); Xorazm Region, Uzbek Soviet Socialist Republic
- Occupations: Musician; Politician
- Political party: Erk Democratic Party

Jahongir Otajonov (Uzbek Cyrillic: Жаҳонгир Отажонов; born 29 September 1978) is an Uzbek singer, musician, songwriter who ran as a candidate in the 2021 Uzbek presidential election.

== Early life ==
Otajonov was born and raised in the Xorazm Region in the northwest of what was then the Uzbek Soviet Socialist Republic. His uncle, Ortiq Otajonov, was a noted musician who was named as the People's Artist of Uzbekistan in 1991, as well as of Turkmenistan and Karakalpakstan in 1993.

== Music career ==
Otajonov was educated at the Glier Music School in Tashkent. He later graduated from the State Conservatory of Uzbekistan.

Otajonov gained popularity in Uzbekistan as a singer-songwriter with songs including "Arazlamang", "Oq kabutarlar", and "Dogʻman".

== 2021 presidential campaign ==
On 20 January 2021, shortly after announcing his retirement from music, Otajonov declared his intention to stand as a candidate in the 2021 Uzbek presidential election on Instagram. He pledged to transform Uzbekistan into "the best country in Central Asia".

In accordance with Uzbek electoral rules stating candidates must stand as part of a registered political party, Otajonov initially announced he would be standing as the candidate for the newly established centre-right Xalq Manfaatlari party; by February 2021, he announced he had left the party following internal disagreements.

In March 2021, Otajonov temporarily moved to Istanbul, Turkey, following harassment from pro-government protestors. While there, he reported being physically harassed by unknown individuals believed to be affiliated with the Uzbek government.

In April 2021, the banned Erk Democratic Party named Otajonov as a potential candidate for their presidential nomination; he was declared the party's official candidate in May 2021. That same month, Otajonov returned to Uzbekistan. During this time, a video of Otajonov's mother went viral on social media, wherein she asked him not to become a "traitor to the Motherland" by running as the Erk candidate; some queried whether she had been forced to say this by the Uzbek government operatives.

On 27 June 2021, Otajonov was convicted of insulting police officers on social media. This followed Otajonov complaining after his car was impounded by police following a political event.

On 12 July 2021, Otajonov officially withdrew his candidacy from the presidential election, citing the pressures and dangers exposed to his family after a mob attacked a political meeting held between him and members of Erk. He also announced he would be retiring from politics altogether.

On 20 October 2021, shortly before the presidential campaign was scheduled to take place, Otajonov was banned from leaving Uzbekistan after attempting to board a flight to Turkey. Otajonov stemmed this was politically motivated, and stemmed from a false accusation that he had failed to pay child support.

== Discography ==
=== Albums ===
- Konsert 2017 (Live)
- Qaddi Baland (2018)
- Jonli Ijro (2019)

=== Singles ===
- Erka Kiyik (2019)
- Jonim (2019)
- Jingalamo (2019)
- O'ynasin (2020)
- Ajib Dunyo (2020)
- Salom Bo'lsin (2021)
