= Narzullo Oblomurodov =

Uzbek politician and scientist

Narzullo Oblomuradov
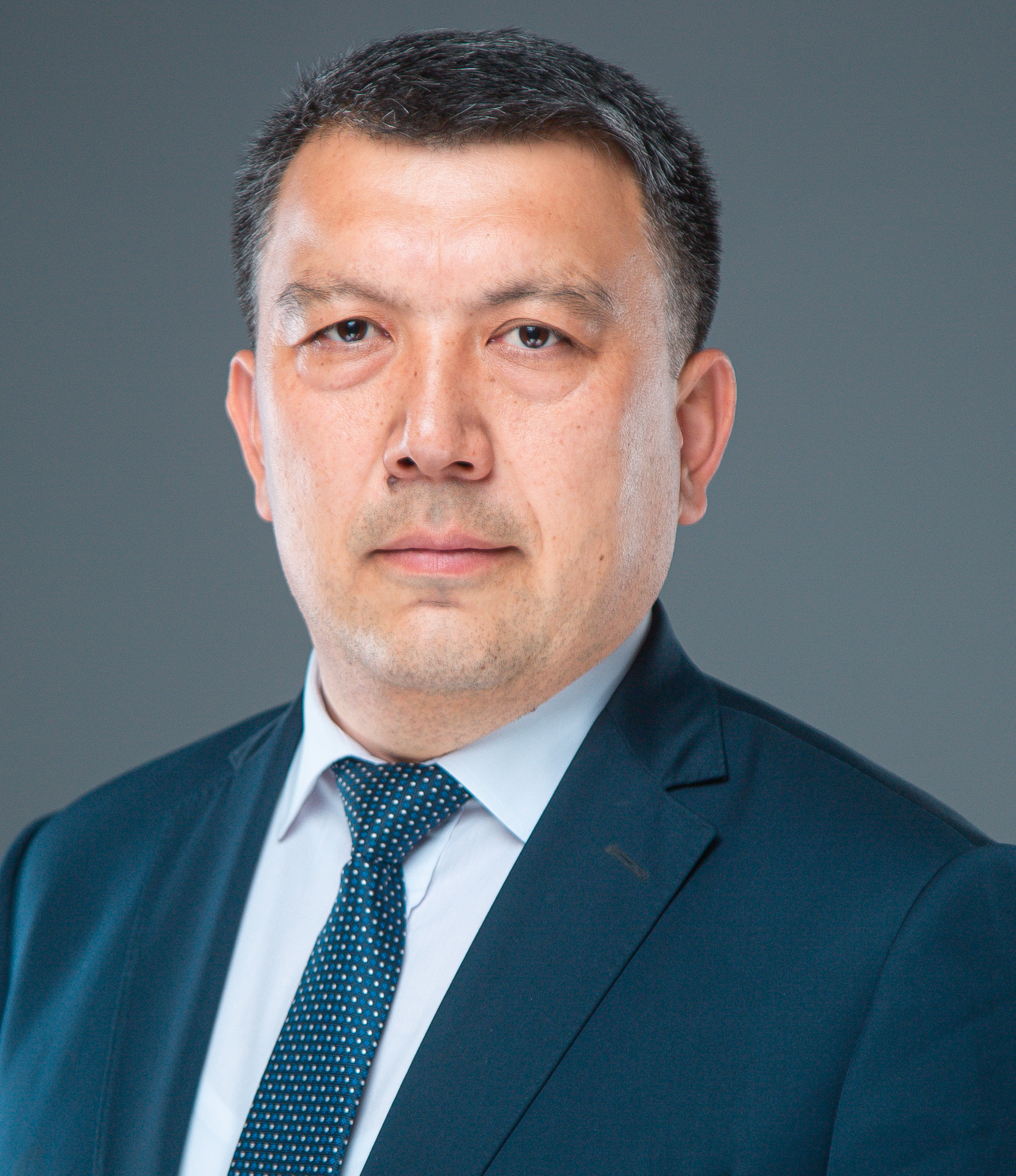

Leader of the Ecological Party
- Incumbent
- Assumed office 1 February 2021
- Preceded by: Komiljon Tajibaev

Personal details
- Born: 22 January 1975 (age 51) Urgut District, Uzbek SSR, Soviet Union
- Party: Ecological Party of Uzbekistan
- Children: 3
- Education: University of World Economy and Diplomacy; University of Birmingham
- Profession: Scientist, economist

Narzullo Naimovich Oblomuradov (Uzbek Cyrillic: Нарзулло Наимович Обломуродов; born 22 January 1975) is an Uzbekistani politician and scientist who has been serving as the leader of the Ecological Party of Uzbekistan since 1 February 2021. Since 30 December 2021, he has been the Chairman of the State Committee of the Republic of Uzbekistan on Ecology and Environmental Protection (Minister of Ecology). He was the Ecological Party's presidential candidate in 2021 presidential elections. He got 4.1%.

== Biography ==
Oblomuradov was born in the Urgut District of Samarqand Region to a family of teachers. He attended the University of World Economy and Diplomacy in Tashkent where he graduated in 1996. From there, Oblomuradov continued his studies by living abroad in the United Kingdom. In 2000, he completed a two year master course in International Economics from Birmingham University. He is a scientist-economist, has a PhD in Economics, and is an associate professor.

From 2000, he worked in the higher education system of Uzbekistan, particularly in the Tashkent Financial Institute and Tashkent Textile and Light Industry Institute, where he served as the head of the chair, the dean of the department, and a researcher. He also worked in the banking, financial and government sectors.

In April 2020, Oblomuradov was appointed First Deputy Chairman of the State Committee on Ecology and Environmental Protection of Uzbekistan. In 1 February 2021, he was elected to a chairman post of the Executive Committee of the Central Council (Leader) for the Ecological Party of Uzbekistan. As the leader of the party, he succeeded Komiljon Tojiboev, whom had prior led the party from November 2020. He was the first presidential candidate nominated in 2021 presidential elections in Uzbekistan.

On December 30, 2021 he was appointed Chairman of the State Committee for Ecology and Environmental Protection of the Republic of Uzbekistan.

== Personal life ==
In addition to Uzbek, Oblomuradov speaks fluent English and Russian. He is married and has three children.

== Bibliography ==
- Муйнокка мадад (Help Muynak)
- Дарахт экинг (Plant trees)
