= Tanzila Norbaeva =

Uzbek politician (born 1957)

- Танзила Норбоева
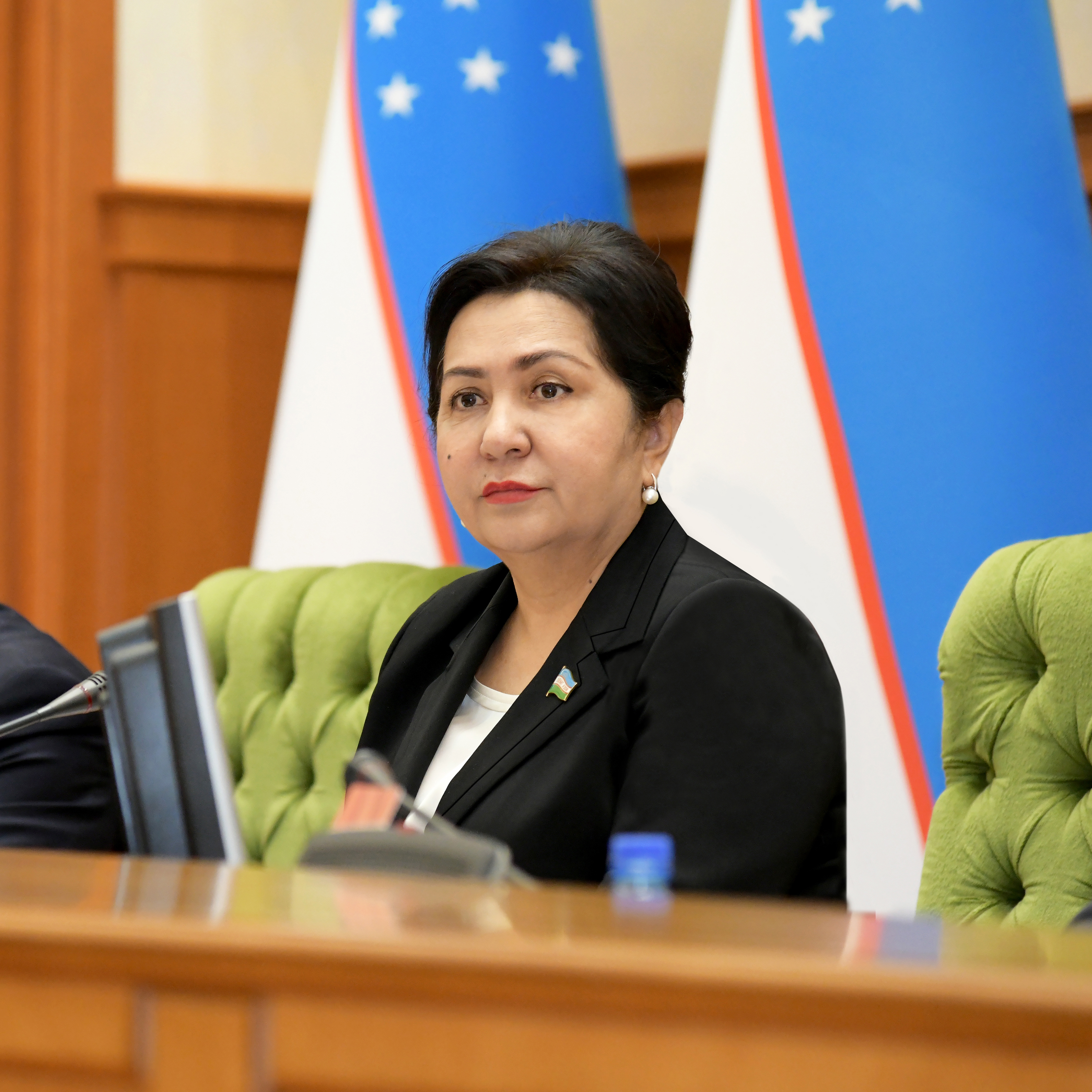
- Narbaeva in 2020

Chairwoman of the Senate of Uzbekistan
- Incumbent
- Assumed office 21 June 2019
- Preceded by: Nigmatilla Yuldashev

Personal details
- Born: 24 July 1957 (age 69) Shahrixon District, Uzbek SSR, Soviet Union
- Education: Tashkent University

Tanzila Kamalovna Norbaeva (Uzbek: Танзила Камoловна Нoрбoева, romanized: Tanzila Kamalovna Norboyeva; born 24 July 1957) is an Uzbek politician. She is the Chairperson of the Senate of Uzbekistan since 2019, She previously served as the Deputy Prime Minister from 2016 to 2019, and was the Chairperson of the Women's Committee from 2016 to 2019.

== Early life and education ==
She was born in 1957 in Shahrixon District in what was then the Soviet Union.

Narbaeva graduated from Tashkent State University with an MA in sociology. In 2007, she received a PhD in Pedagogy at the same university. In 2020, she earned a doctorate in sociology at the Academy of Public Administration under the President of the Republic of Uzbekistan.

== Career ==
- 2019–present – Chairperson of the Senate of the Oliy Majlis of the Republic of Uzbekistan
- 2016–2019 – Deputy Prime Minister, Chairperson of the women's committee of Uzbekistan
- 2010–2016 – Chairperson of the Federation of Trade Unions of Uzbekistan
- 2008–2010 – Chief officer of the Information and Analytical Department for Education, Health and Social Protection of the Cabinet of Ministers of the Republic of Uzbekistan
- 2005–2008 – Senior specialist of the Information and Analytical Department for Education, Health and Social Protection of the Cabinet of Ministers of the Republic of Uzbekistan
- 1998–2005 – Head of the Secretariat of the Deputy Prime Minister of the Republic of Uzbekistan (complex for social protection of family, motherhood and childhood)
- 1997–1998 – Assistant of the Deputy Prime Minister of the Republic of Uzbekistan (complex for social protection of family, motherhood and childhood)
- 1995–1997 – Head of the Secretariat of the office of Deputy Prime Minister of the Republic of Uzbekistan
- 1993–1995 – Head of the department of the Central Council of the People's Democratic party of Uzbekistan
- 1991–1993 – Secretary of the Sobir Rahimov district's Council of the People's democratic party of Uzbekistan
- 1988–1991 – Specialist of the party committee of the Sobir Rahimov's district in Tashkent
- 1986–1988 – Director of Tashkent city schoolchildren house
- 1974–1986 – Worked on leading positions in primary public education sector, studied at the Tashkent State University (1975–1981)
