= Khidirnazar Allakulov =

Uzbek scientist-economist

Khidirnazar Allakulov Doctor of Economic Sciences
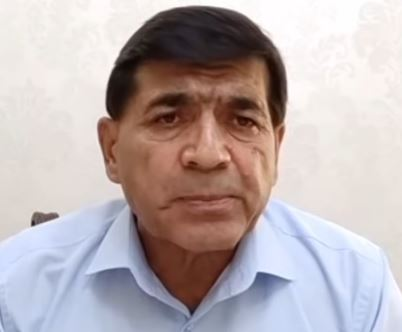

Personal details
- Born: 1956 (age 69–70) Shurchinsky, Uzbek SSR, Soviet Union (modern-day Surkhandarya, Uzbekistan)
- Party: HTSDP
- Children: 4
- Education: Tashkent Institute of National Economy (Tashkent State Economic University)
- Profession: Doctor of Economic Sciences

Khidirnazar Allakulov (Uzbek Latin: Xidirnazar Olloqulov, Uzbek Cyrillic: Хидирназар Оллоқулов; born 1956) is an Uzbek scientist-economist, professor, and dissident. He was rector of Termez State University from May 2002 to June 2004. In early June 2020, he announced the beginning of the process of creating the Truth and Development Social Democratic Party (TDSDP) in Uzbekistan and his desire to run as a presidential candidate in the next presidential elections in 2021.

== Biography ==
Allakulov was born in 1956 in the Shurchinsky district of the Surkhandarya, Uzbekistan. In 1976-1977, he served in the ranks of the Soviet army on the territory of Czechoslovakia. Graduated from the Tashkent Institute of National Economy (now the Tashkent State Economic University). After graduation, he stayed to work at this institute in various positions, including a teacher. After that, he worked in various positions, including as a teacher, head of the department and vice-rector at the Tashkent Financial Institute. Graduated from postgraduate and doctoral studies. In 1997, he studied at the Institute for Economic Development of the World Bank in the United States.

Allakulov is married. He has four children and seven grandchildren.

== Rector of the TSU and subsequent events ==
On 24 May 2002, Khidirnazar Allakulov was appointed rector of Termez State University (TSU), one of the largest universities in the south of Uzbekistan. On 17 June 2004, he was removed from the position in which according to Allakulov himself and independent media, the reason for his dismissal from the post of rector was his struggle and categorical disagreement with the corruption schemes that were built by the regional leaders of the National Security Service of Uzbekistan. He was threatened by officers of the National Security Service of Uzbekistan, and subsequently criminal cases were fabricated against him. As a sign of disagreement and protest with his dismissal, Allakulov began to sue, and he was repeatedly recognized by the courts of various instances of the Republic of Uzbekistan (he won 14 courts, including in the Supreme Court of Uzbekistan), as well as by the UN Human Rights Committee (July 19, 2017). You can read more about this case here. In the history of independent Uzbekistan, Allakulov became one of the few who was fully rehabilitated in the courts of Uzbekistan, recognizing his complete innocence. Despite the victories in the courts, Allakulov was not reinstated in his post, and the government did not react in any way either to the decisions of the courts of Uzbekistan, or to the decision of the UN Human Rights Committee. According to him, in addition to the courts, he addressed various receptions many times, wrote open letters. Allakulov claims that the decree on his removal from the post of rector of Termez State University was signed by Shavkat Mirziyoyev, who was then the Prime Minister of Uzbekistan. According to him, most of the participants in the case of his removal from the rector's office now occupy important government posts. In July 2019, Allakulov wrote an open objection letter to Mirziyoyev, explaining in detail the true reasons for his dismissal, subsequent threats and court cases.

== Criticism of Islam Karimov and Shavkat Mirziyoyev ==
On May 20, 2020, Khidirnazar Allakulov gave a long interview to the editor-in-chief of the Adabiyot newspaper Bakhtiyor Karim, which was published under the loud title: " "Nominations must not be allowed Mirziyoyev's candidacy in the upcoming presidential elections. Why "?". In his interview, Allakulov sharply criticized the reign of Islam Karimov. He said "However, due to his incompetence in macroeconomics, he claimed that Uzbekistan was allegedly among the ten poorest countries in the world. Moreover, despite the fact that, according to the World Bank, the number of poor citizens in Uzbekistan does not exceed 4- 5 million people, he claimed that according to his calculations their number reaches from 23 to 25 million (out of 34 million), while showing that he does not distinguish between the concept of poverty and the concept of poverty, he was not talking about poverty, but about Poverty citizens, who are practically non-existent among the population of Uzbekistan." According to him, the middle class has not yet formed in the country. In this interview, Allakulov also analyzed the period of Shavkat Mirziyoyev's rule. He also sharply criticized the wholesale slowdown and curtailment of all the reforms announced by Mirziyoyev in the first years of his rule. According to Allakulov, Uzbekistan urgently needs a free market economy, democracy and freedom, fair economic and political competition, the destruction of monopolies, corruption and nepotism. To do this, according to Allakulov, it is necessary to make cardinal political and economic reforms towards freedom and full openness, as well as to promote the development of the economy in “jerks”. The interview caused a great resonance on YouTube, thanks to which a certain number of supporters of Khidirnazar Allakulov appeared on this social network. Some of them left under this his interview, which is discussed here, that they support his criticism of the leadership of the republic.

== Activity ==
=== The first attempt at the process of creating a real people's political party in Uzbekistan ===
On 4 June 2020, another video interview of Allakulov to the editor-in-chief of the Adabiyot newspaper Bakhtiyor Karim was posted online, in which Allakulov announced the beginning of the process of creating a new Truth and Progress Social Democratic Party (HTSDP) in Uzbekistan, focused on secularism and the principles of social democracy. On the same day, Allakulov, in an interview with the Uzbek service of Radio Free Europe, confirmed the start of the process of creating the party, reiterating that if there is support from the population, then there will be a party. When asked by a journalist whether he wants to participate in the upcoming presidential elections in 2021, Allakulov answered in the affirmative if he is elected leader of the new party and if the leadership of the new party nominates him in the elections. The news of the intentions of Allakulov to create a new party and subsequently participate in the upcoming presidential elections was consecrated by the Uzbek service of the BBC World Service. This news was also reacted by the Uzbek service of the Voice of America, which found out that the initiative group of the founders of the party included a number of well-known scientists and teachers in Uzbekistan with academic degrees and titles, former politicians, journalists, public figures and cultural figures. At the same time, state and private media operating within Uzbekistan did not sanctify this news in any way. The day after Allakulov's YouTube video interview was announced to Bakhtiyor Karim, the educational YouTube channel Xurshid Davron Kutubxonasi (Xurshid Davron's Library), which had 38,900 subscribers and a total number of views exceeding one million views, on which this interview was uploaded, was banned due to the fact that numerous complaints have been filed against the channel. Despite the channel's ban, the videos were uploaded on their YouTube and Facebook pages by many people, including famous personalities, since at the end of this interview, the interviewer Bakhtiyor Karim stated that he provides this video interview under an open license, and asked everyone, especially journalists to re-upload it and distribute it in all social networks and websites.

On 5 May 2021, it was reported that Allakulov was fined for alleged slander in the amount of 4,900,000 so'm.

In July 2021, Allakulov's residence in Tashkent was visited by the employees of the Bureau of Compulsory Enforcement, which confiscated several Allakulov's household items in which Allakulov himself described the incident as "robbery with the participation of representatives of the authorities", accusing the Uzbek government in forcing his neighbours to write false stating that the event was inflirtrated to publicly humiliate and in attempt to force end his political career.

In a Current Time TV interview following the presidential elections, Allakulov announced that he would attempt in creating a new opposition party called Justice, Progress and Unity.
