= Novosti Uzbekistana =

Daily newspaper in Uzbekistan

Nоvоsti Uzbekistаnа
- Type: Daily newspaper
- Owner: Media Biznes LLP
- Publisher: Media Biznes LLP
- Political alignment: Pro-government
- Language: Russian
- Headquarters: Tashkent
- Website: https://www.nuz.uz/ru/

Nоvоsti Uzbekistаnа (Russian: News of Uzbekistan) is a Russian-language newspaper published in Uzbekistan. It is one of the privately owned dailies in the country.

== Profile ==
Nоvоsti Uzbekistаnа is privately owned, namely by Media Biznes LLP and is headquartered in Tashkent. In the early 2000s the daily was semi-official, supporting the government of Uzbekistan.

Until 16 April 2013 Bahodyr Yuldashev served as the editor-in-chief of the paper.

== Incidents ==
In June 2012 a Tashkent commercial court charged Nоvоsti Uzbekistаnа with damaging the image of the political party, Ecological Movement of Uzbekistan, due to an article published in December 2011. The paper was ordered by the court to cover the procedural fees and publish a repudiation of its article about the party.

== See also ==
- List of newspapers in Uzbekistan
