= Maqsuda Vorisova =

Uzbek politician (born 1961)

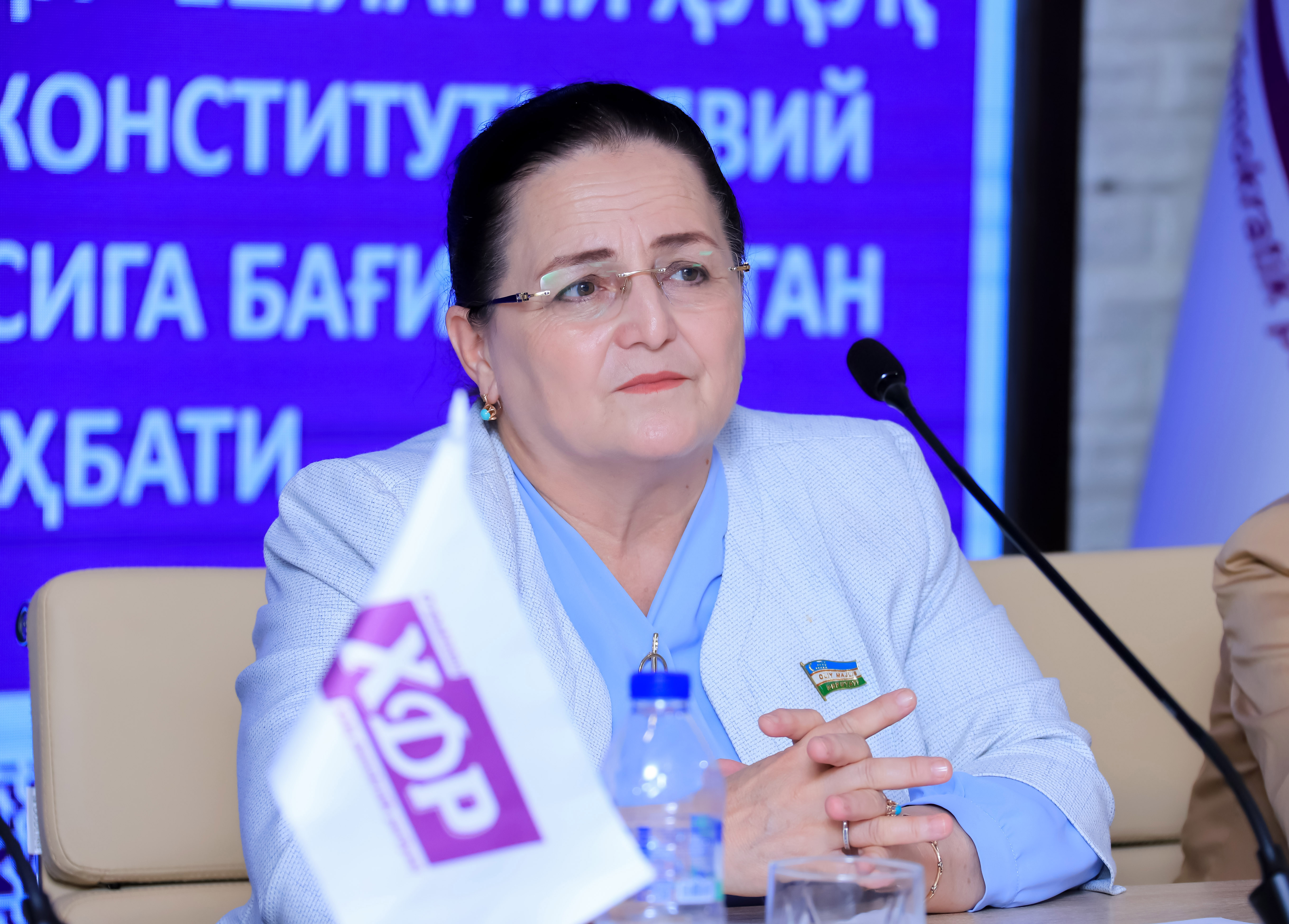
- Vorisova in 2022

Senator for Tashkent Region
- In office January 2015 – January 2020

Member of the Legislative Chamber
- Incumbent
- Assumed office 22 December 2019
- Constituency: 91st Zangiata District

Member of the Tashkent Regional Kengash
- In office December 2014 – January 2020

Member of the Zangiata District Kengash of People's Deputies
- In office December 2009 – January 2015

Personal details
- Born: 20 January 1961 (age 65) Tashkent, Uzbek SSR, Soviet Union
- Party: XDP
- Spouse: Unknown (m. 1986)
- Children: 3
- Education: Tashkent State Medical Institute
- Profession: Doctor, therapist

Maqsuda Azizovna Vorisova (born 20 January 1961) is an Uzbek politician who is serving as a member of the Legislative Chamber of Uzbekistan since 2019. Prior to that, she was a member of the Tashkent Regional Kengash and Senator for Tashkent Region simultaneously from 2015 to 2019. Having a profession as a therapist, Vorisova became active in politics in 2009, where from there, she served as a local councillor within the Zangiata District.

Vorisova ran for presidency from the People's Democratic Party of Uzbekistan (XDP) where she has member of and served as the party's central council deputy chairwoman. In the October 2021 presidential elections, Vorisova took second place in race with 6.6% of the vote, an unusually impressive performance.

== Biography ==
=== Early life and career ===
Born to an educated family in Tashkent, Vorisova graduated from the Tashkent State Medical Institute in 1984, where she from there worked as a doctor in the clinic. From 1989, Vorisova began working in the rural Nazarbek medical center in the Zangiata District, of which she became the head in 2003.

In 2009, she was elected as a councillor in the Zangiata District Kengash of People's Deputies where she served until 2015, when becoming a member of the Uzbek Senate and Tashkent Regional Kengash at the same time from 2015 to 2019. During the period, Vorisova became a deputy chairwoman of the People's Democratic Party of Uzbekistan (XDP) central council.

In the 2019–20 parliamentary elections, Vorisova was elected as member of the Legislative Chamber. From there, she served in committees of Public Health and Family and Women's Affairs.

=== 2021 presidential campaign ===
On 7 August 2021, Vorisova was nominated for presidency by the XDP to contest the presidential election, becoming the first and only woman to appear on a ballot since Diloram Tashmukhamedova in 2007. From there, she pledged to solve issues regarding education and medicine. She ran in series of platforms related to egalitarian and social priorities in spheres to living standards, justice and equality, and democracy, which were seen to have correlated with the Nordic model according to Podrobno.uz.

Although losing the race to incumbent Shavkat Mirziyoyev, Vorisova became one of the runner ups in the election, earning second place with 6.6% vote share, making her the first person since Muhammad Salih in 1991 to gain more than 5% as a highest-performing non incumbent in the presidential vote.
