= 2009–10 Uzbek parliamentary election =

- 27 December 2009 (first round); 10 January 2010 (second round)
- 135 of the 150 seats in the Legislative Chamber; 76 seats needed for a majority
- Turnout: 87.76% (first round); 79.70% (second round)
Party	Leader	Seats	+/–
OʻzLiDeP	Muhammadusuf Teshabaev	53	+12
XDP	Latif G'ulomov	32	+4
Milliy Tiklanish	Axtam Tursunov	31	+2
ASDP	Ismoil Sayfnazarov	19	+9
Ecological Movement	Boriy Alixonov	15	New
This lists parties that won seats. See the complete results below.
Speaker before	Speaker after
Diloram Tashmukhamedova; ASDP	Diloram Tashmukhamedova; ASDP

Parliamentary elections were held in Uzbekistan on 27 December 2009 and 10 January 2010 to elect the 150 members of the Legislative Chamber of Uzbekistan, the lower house of the Oliy Majlis. Of these, 135 were directly elected from single member constituencies using the two-round system, while 15 seats were reserved for the country's Ecological Movement. Provincial and district councils were elected at the same time. Polls opened at 06:00 and closed at 20:00.

The Uzbekistan Liberal Democratic Party (O'zlidep) was reconfirmed as the largest single party in the Legislative Chamber, with 55 deputies. The other parties permitted to participate in the elections were the People's Democratic Party of Uzbekistan (32 deputies), the Uzbekistan National Revival Democratic Party (Milliy Tiklanish, 31 deputies) and the Justice Social Democratic Party (Adolat, 19 deputies).

The elections were monitored by over 270 observers from 36 countries and representatives of four international missions. The election monitoring arm of the Organization for Security and Co-operation in Europe (OSCE) did not send a full mission, saying none of its earlier recommendations had been implemented: An OSCE assessment mission observed voting at several polling places, but did not do comprehensive vote monitoring. Veronica Szente Goldston, Human Rights Watch Advocacy Director for Europe and Central Asia, said the pre-election situation in Uzbekistan has been marked by intense repression by the government: "Human rights are violated everywhere around the country, there is no political competition, all the parties that are running for this election are supporting the government."

== Campaign ==
A candidate for election had to belong to a registered party and collect a minimum of 40,000 signatures. Several opposition politicians have alleged that all candidates also had to be approved by the government before they would be placed on the ballot. The four registered parties were:

- Adolat (Justice Social Democratic Party), with 123 candidates and 10 seats in the outgoing legislative chamber;
- Milliy Tiklanish (Uzbekistan National Revival Democratic Party), with 125 candidates and 29 seats in the outgoing legislative chamber; (Note: Including 18 seats from the former Self-Sacrifice National Democratic Party, which merged in 2008.)
- People's Democratic Party of Uzbekistan (PDP), with 134 candidates and 28 seats in the outgoing legislative chamber;
- Uzbekistan Liberal Democratic Party (O'zlidep), with 135 candidates and 41 seats in the outgoing legislative chamber.

The election campaign consisted of 15- to 20-minute television programs each day for four days, as well as a second program called "Election – Mirror of Democracy". Transcripts from these shows were reprinted in newspapers, and billboards also appeared touting the upcoming choice that Uzbeks had to make. The four parties have publicly criticized each other, mainly over social policy, while praising President Islam Karimov's achievements. Freedom House, a US-based human rights organization, says the discussions appeared on television for the first time, which was a positive development, but that "We have some evidence from Uzbek activists that those debates were scripted. And even if not – these parties don't know themselves who they are, they have no ideology."

=== Ecological Movement ===
The Ecological Movement of Uzbekistan elected its 15 legislators at a congress, also held on 27 December, one from each territorial subdivision of Uzbekistan (Republic of Karakalpakstan, provinces and Tashkent city) plus one member from the executive committee of the Central Council of the Ecological Movement. Delegates to the congress were elected in equal numbers at the conferences of each of the territorial branches of the Ecological Movement.

== Turnout ==
There were 17,215,700 eligible voters for the 2009 parliamentary elections. By 13:00 57.3% (9,879,195 voters) had cast their vote, ensuring that the election would be valid under Uzbekistani election law (33% minimum turnout required). By 17:00 79.4% (13,670,387 voters) had cast their votes. Final turnout for the first round (based on provisional figures) was 87.8% (15,108,950 voters).

On 24 December all 16 million mobile phone users in Uzbekistan received an SMS informing them of the forthcoming elections. According to an Uzbek living in exile in the United States, "there are certain groups of the population which are under pressure and they are compelled to participate in the election – students, teachers, government employees."

For the second round on 10 January 2010, the electorate was 4,969,547. Of these, 16.3% (812,502 voters) were reported to have voted by 09:00, just three hours after polling stations had opened. The final turnout (based on provisional figures) when polls closed at 20:00 was 79.7% (3,960,876 voters).

== Results ==
Preliminary results were announced by the Central Election Commission on 29 December. Results were declared in 96 out of the 135 electoral districts; in the remaining 39 districts, no candidate obtained an overall majority of votes, and so a second round of voting was held in 10 January 2010. Final results were announced by the Central Election Commission on 13 January 2010.

Party	First round			Second round			Total seats	+/–
Party	Votes	%	Seats	Votes	%	Seats	Total seats	+/–
Uzbekistan Liberal Democratic Party			33			20	53	+12
People's Democratic Party of Uzbekistan			22			10	32	+4
Uzbekistan National Revival Democratic Party			25			6	31	+2
Justice Social Democratic Party			16			3	19	+9
Ecological Movement of Uzbekistan							15	New
Total			96			39	150	+30
Total votes	15,108,950	–		3,960,876	–			
Registered voters/turnout	17,215,700	87.76		4,969,547	79.70			
Source: CEC
