= Xalq Soʻzi =

Xalq So‘zi
- Owner(s): State-run
- Editor: Oʻtkir Rahmat
- Language: Uzbek
- Headquarters: Tashkent
- Website: http://xs.uz/en

Xalq So‘zi, also transliterated as Khalq Sozi (Uzbek: Xalq soʻzi; English: People's Word) is a state-run Uzbek language newspaper published from Uzbekistan.

== History and profile ==
Xalq So‘zi is a government-owned publication. Abbashon Usmanov was the editor-in-chief of the daily until July 2006. Shukhrat Jabborov succeeded him in the post.

Xalq So‘zi has a Russian language sister publication, Narodnoye Slovo.

The chief editor as of 2023 is Oʻtkir Rahmat.
