= Narodnoye Slovo =

- Owner(s): State-run
- Language: Russian language
- Headquarters: Tashkent
- Website: www.narodnoeslovo.uz

Narodnoye Slovo (Russian: Народное слово; English: People's Word) is a Russian language newspaper published from Uzbekistan. It is run by the government. The paper has an Uzbek language sister publication, Xalq So'zi.
