= Truth and Progress Social Democratic Party =

Political party in Uzbekistan

Truth and Progress Social Democratic Party “Haqiqat va Taraqqiyot” sotsial-demokratik partiyasi
- Abbreviation: HTSDP
- Leader: Khidirnazar Allakulov
- Founder: Khidirnazar Allakulov
- Founded: 8 March 2021
- Headquarters: Tashkent
- Newspaper: Adabiyot
- Ideology: Secularism; Social democracy Progressivism; Internationalism
- Political position: Centre-left
- Colours: Green
- Legislative Chamber: 0 / 150

Truth and Progress Social Democratic Party (Uzbek: “Haqiqat va Taraqqiyot” sotsial-demokratik partiyasi) is an unregistered political party in Uzbekistan. Its founding congress took place on 8 March 2021. Party leader Khidirnazar Allakulov began to publicly express the idea of creating a new party in May 2020. As a centre-left party, it promotes internationalism, progressivism, secularism, and social democracy.

== History ==
On 4 June 2020, Bakhtiyor Karim, the editor-in-chief of Adabiyot, conducted a video interview of Khidirnazar Allakulov, in which Allakulov announced the beginning of the process of creating a new Truth and Progress Social Democratic Party, focused on secularism and the principles of social democracy. When asked by a journalist whether he wants to participate in the 2021 presidential elections, Allakulov answered in the affirmative if he were to be elected leader of the new party and if the leadership nominated him. The news appeared on the BBC Uzbek service and the Voice of America Uzbek service. State and private media operating inside Uzbekistan did not cover the story. The day after Allakulov's YouTube interview, the educational YouTube channel Xurshid Davron Kutubxonasi, which had 38,900 subscribers and more than one million views, on which this interview was uploaded, was banned. Despite the ban, the videos were uploaded on YouTube and Facebook pages by many people, including famous figures.

In early June 2020, Karim, along with several family members, was placed in a quarantine camp under the pretext of suspected coronavirus infection. In July and November 2020, fake issues of the Adabiyot newspaper were published, which criticized Allakulov and his ideas about creating a party. Party activists reported opposition and pressure from the security forces.

With the weakening of restrictions in Uzbekistan, starting in November 2020, Allakulov and party activists made repeated attempts to hold a constituent congress and begin the work of the party. In November and December 2020, and in January and February 2021, repeated attempts to hold a founding congress of the party were postponed for reasons beyond their control. In one case, the makhallah where the building for the congress was located was cordoned off by law enforcement agencies, people in civilian clothes and ambulance workers, allegedly to disinfect the territory against coronavirus. In other cases, the tenants of the buildings that provided the venue asked them not to hold this event under various pretexts ("renovation", "the building is not working", and "the building is rented for another event on this day"). The tenants of the premises for the party's office began to behave in a similar way. Repeatedly the tenants demanded that the party vacate the premises.

At the beginning of 2021, Karim, split from the party, expressing distrust of Allakulov, and tried to create a splinter wing. But no one joined him, and he withdrew from political activities. At the end of February, security forces tried to break into Allakulov's residence. Despite the opposition, the party held its founding congress on 8 March 2021, adopted its charter, made other organizational decisions, and elected the party leadership. Allakulov was elected party leader. In early April, the activists submitted an application to the Ministry of Justice to register the party and provided signatures. Their application was rejected twice.
