= Ecological Party of Uzbekistan =

Political party in Uzbekistan

Ecological Party of Uzbekistan O‘zbekiston ekologik partiyasi
- Abbreviation: O'EP
- Leader: Аbdushukur Xamzayev
- Founder: Boriy Alikhanov
- Founded: 2 August 2008; 18 years ago
- Registered: 8 January 2019; 7 years ago
- Headquarters: Yakkasaray district, Abulla Qahhor street 2G
- Membership (2019): 240,000
- Ideology: Green politics
- Colours: Green
- Legislative Chamber: 16 / 150

Website
- ecouz.uz

Old party logo

The Ecological Party of Uzbekistan (Uzbek: O‘zbekiston ekologik partiyasi, O'EP; Russian: Экологическая партия Узбекистана, romanized: Ekologicheskaya partiya Uzbekistana) is a political party and environmental movement in Uzbekistan. It was founded on 2 August 2008 as the Ecological Movement of Uzbekistan (Uzbek: O'zbekiston ekologik harakati; Russian: Экологическое движение Узбекистана, romanized: Ekologicheskoye dvizheniye Uzbekistana), and re-inaugurated as a formal political party in January 2019 in advance of expected electoral reforms.

Before the 2019 reforms, fifteen of the 150 seats in the Legislative Chamber of Uzbekistan (the lower chamber of the Oliy Majlis) had been reserved for the movement under the revised electoral law of 2008. Its legislators were elected at a congress held in conjunction with the 2009–10 Uzbek parliamentary election. One legislator was elected from each territorial subdivision of Uzbekistan (the Republic of Karakalpakstan, provinces, and the city of Tashkent), plus one member from the Executive Committee of the Central Council of the Ecological Movement. Delegates to the congress were elected in equal numbers at the conferences of each of the territorial branches of the Ecological Movement.

== Party history ==
On 14 November 2018 the Ecological Party of Uzbekistan is an initiative group of 100 people formed to create a party engaged in environmental policy, which is considered an important priority for the conservation of natural resources and environmental protection, state and community life in the country. called by.

It was established at the party forum held on 8 January 2019. At the same forum, issues such as drafts of the party's Charter and Program, election of members of the Central Council, Regulation of the Central Control and Inspection Commission, establishment of a press body, and election of authorized representatives of the party were considered.

It was registered by the Ministry of Justice of the Uzbekistan on 22 January 2019.

== The main idea of the party ==
Ensuring the implementation of the state policy aimed at achieving ecologically sustainable development of the country, ecological security, creating a comfortable environment for the current and future generations, and preserving natural resources The main idea of the party is to help one citizen achieve his mission.

== Central governing body ==
The highest governing body of the party is the Party Forum. It is convened at least once every five years. Extraordinary Forum is convened by the decision of the Central Council at the proposal of the Executive Committee of the Party Central Council, the Central Control and Audit Commission of the Party, or at the request of several organizations of the Party uniting at least one third of the total number of Party members. Forum delegates are elected at the Conferences of the Party's regional organizations.

== Central Council ==
In the period between forums, the central governing body of the Party is the Central Council of the Party. He represents the interests of the party and acts on its behalf. It implements issues such as the implementation of the Party Program, the decisions of Forums and Plenums of the Central Council of the Party. Members of the Central Council of the Party are elected at the Forum for a period of five years from among the representatives of regional party organizations. The number of members of the Central Council of the Party is determined by the Forum. The Plenum of the Party Central Council is the main form of activity of the Party Central Council, convened at least once a year, and is considered authoritative if more than half of the total number of members participate. An extraordinary Plenum may be convened upon the initiative of one-third of the members of the Central Council of the Party.

== Executive Committee of the Central Council ==
During the period between Plenums of the Central Council of the Party, the Executive Committee represents the interests of the Party and acts on its behalf within the framework of the powers given to it by the Forum and the Central Council of the Party. Meetings of the Executive Committee of the Central Council of the Party are held when necessary, but at least once every three months.

== Central control-audit commission ==
The Central Control and Audit Commission of the Party is the central control body of the Party, and supervises officials and executive bodies, subordinate party organizations in connection with the fulfillment of the requirements of this Charter and the decisions of the leading bodies of the party, as well as their financial and economic activities. inspects the activity. The party CCAC conducts its activities based on the legislation of the Republic of Uzbekistan, the Charter and the Charter approved by the Forum. The party is elected for a five-year term at the CCAC Forum. Members of the Central Council cannot be elected as members of the National Committee of the Party. The number of members of the National Committee of the Party is determined by the Forum. The chairman and deputies of the Party National Committee are elected at the first meeting of the National Committee of the Party.

== Participation of the party in the elections ==
On 22 December 2019 as the youngest party in our country Ministry of Justice of the Uzbekistan took part in the elections to the Legislative Chamber and local representative bodies based on the updated electoral legislation adapted to international standards and won 624 seats.

On 24 October 2021 the Ecological Party of Uzbekistan, which has been active as a political force for three years, took part in the presidential election of the Republic of Uzbekistan for the first time in the history of our country. At the 3rd meeting of the party, Narzullo Oblomurodov, the chairman of the Central Council of the party, was approved for the presidency from the Ecological Party of Uzbekistan. Despite participating for the first time, the Ecological Party of Uzbekistan held the election at a high level.

On 30 April 2023 one of the largest political processes in the history of our country - the reforms carried out on amendments and additions to the Constitution of the Republic of Uzbekistan, the Ecological Party of Uzbekistan took an active part. A total of 3,554 events were held to discuss the draft constitutional law and convey its content to the population, which included 67,477 participants. More than 7,500 suggestions were made by the party during the preparation of the draft of the new version of the Constitution, and they were summarized in our general dictionary.

== Projects implemented by the party ==
About 30 projects were implemented by the party during 2019-2023. In particular, on the basis of the proposal of the Ecological Party of Uzbekistan, on 26 January 2019 on the basis of the order of the Cabinet of Ministers, for the first time, a nationwide environmental charity event was held across the country. Most importantly, the main part of the funds collected within the framework of the environmental campaign was directed to the improvement of the ecological, economic, and social situation in Aral.

Every year, the party organizations of the Republic of Karakalpakstan, regions and the city of Tashkent organize the campaign "Help to the island" and collect saxhaul seeds. About 5,000 kg of the seeds were collected by all regional organizations of the party and delivered to the island.

In 2022-2023, under the slogan Tabiatni plastik va polietilenlardan asraylik, Yashil taraqqiyot uchun!, ecoforum, Maishiy chiqindilarni qayta ishlash, ekologik ta’lim va tarbiya tizimini rivojlantirish, Ekologik o‘n kunlik, Tabiat uchun g‘amho‘rmiz, Yashil qo‘llar, Velamarafon, Yashil makon, Ekobog‘lar nationwide projects are being implemented. In particular, during the first three months of 2024, 6 projects were implemented by the party and about 21 thousand residents and young people were covered.

For example, an eco-velomarathon under the slogan Yashil taraqqiyot uchun! in Navoi Region, a campaign to plant saplings under the slogan Yashil taraqqiyot uchun birlashaylik in Tuproqkala District of Khorezm Region, and our youth in all regions within the framework of the project Biz, kelajak yosh liderlari Ekopartiyani tanlaymiz and our citizens actively participated.

In 2024, members elected from our party to the Youth Parliament under the Legislative Chamber of the Oliy Majlis will also present Qonunchilik yoshlar nigohida, Deputat va yoshlar, Imkoniyat! Barchasi Siz uchun, Rahbar va yoshlar uchrashuvi, Partiya yosh yetakchilarni shakllantiradi, Yosh ekologlar birlashdi are being implemented. According to the party, these projects increase the ecological culture of the population and youth, including their responsibility in caring for the environment and in achieving prosperity and harmony in the regions.

In addition, deputies elected from our party in their elected districts Innovatsion texnologiyalar asosida aholini toza ichimlik suvi bilan ta’minlash, Parlamentning Orolga nigohi, Deputat mahallada, Aholi bilan yuzma-yuz, Saylovchilarning muammolari deputat e’tiborida and Siz ishongan partiya deputati are being organized.

== Senate members elected from the Ecological Party of Uzbekistan ==
| Orynbaev Amanbai Tlewbaevich Deputy Chairman of the Senate of the Oliy Majlis of the Republic of Uzbekistan. |
| Alikhanov Boriy Botirovich Chairman of the Committee on Development of the Aral Region and Ecology of the Senate of the Oliy Majlis of the Republic of Uzbekistan. |
| Khursanov Abdullo Khalmuradovich Member of the Senate of the Oliy Majlis of the Republic of Uzbekistan on Judiciary and Anti-Corruption Committee. |
| Suyarova Sanobar Zarfullayevna Member of the Committee on Budget and Economic Reforms of the Senate of the Oliy Majlis of the Republic of Uzbekistan. |
| Djalolov Shavkat Amonovich Member of the Committee on Agrarian and Water Management of the Senate of the Oliy Majlis of the Republic of Uzbekistan. |

== Deputies of the Legislative Chamber of the Oliy Majlis elected from the Ecological Party of Uzbekistan ==
| Boriy Alikhanov (8 June 1961 Tashkent, Uzbek SSR, USSR) - Uzbek politician, since 8 January 2019 the leader of the Ecological Party of Uzbekistan, since December 2019, a deputy of the legislative chamber of the Oliy Majlis of the Republic of Uzbekistan of the 4th convocation. Candidate of Economics. |
| Gapporov Khairillo (9 December 1971 Namangan district, Namangan region, Uzbek SSR, USSR) is an Uzbek politician, teacher and chemist. Deputy of the Legislative Chamber of the Oliy Majlis of the Republic of Uzbekistan. Member of the Ecology and Environmental Protection Committee of the Legislative Chamber of the Oliy Majlis. Member of the Ecological Party of Uzbekistan. |
| Khojanazarov Turgunboy (30 August 1974 Kegeili district, Karakalpakstan, Uzbek SSR, USSR) - Uzbek politician, agronomist. Member of the Ecology and Environmental Protection Committee. Member of the Ecological Party of Uzbekistan. Chairman of the Ecology and Environmental Protection Committee of the Republic of Karakalpakstan. |
| Islam Khushvaktov (27 February 1967 Kashkadarya region, Uzbek SSR, USSR) - Uzbek politician, zoo engineer. Member of the Committee on Ecology and Environmental Protection of the Legislative Chamber of the Oliy Majlis of the Republic of Uzbekistan. Member of the Ecological Party of Uzbekistan. Deputy chairman of the Ecological Party of Uzbekistan for organizational, party and personnel issues. Doctor of Agricultural Sciences. |
| Abdurakhim Eshankulovich (10 May 1974 Zharkurgan district - 8 July 2021, Tashkent) is an Uzbek politician and historian. Deputy of the Legislative Chamber of the Oliy Majlis of the Republic of Uzbekistan. A member of the Committee on Agrarian and Water Management. Member of the Ecological Party of Uzbekistan. Candidate of historical sciences. Member of the Committee on Combating Corruption and Judiciary Legal Issues. |
| Shuhrat Abduhalimov (17 May 1977 Samarkand region, Uzbek SSR, USSR) - Uzbek politician, jurist. Member of the Committee on Ecology and Environmental Protection of the Legislative Chamber of the Oliy Majlis of the Republic of Uzbekistan. Member of the Ecological Party of Uzbekistan. |
| Mohira Khojayeva (23 July 1966 Tashkent, Uzbek SSR, USSR) - Uzbek politician, teacher of special education. Deputy of the Legislative Chamber of the Oliy Majlis of the Republic of Uzbekistan. Member of the Committee on Innovative Development, Information Policy and Information Technologies. Member of the Ecological Party of Uzbekistan. |
| Mukaddas Tirkasheva (1 November 1974 Jizzakh district, Jizzakh region, Uzbek SSR, USSR) - Uzbek politician, biology teacher. Deputy of the Legislative Chamber of the Oliy Majlis of the Republic of Uzbekistan. Member of the International Affairs and Interparliamentary Relations Committee of the Legislative Chamber of the Oliy Majlis of the Republic of Uzbekistan. |
| Kamal Jumaniozov (13 July 1989 Bogot district, Khorezm region, Uzbek SSR, USSR) - Uzbek politician, philologist. Member of the Ecology and Environmental Protection Committee. Deputy of the Legislative Chamber of the Oliy Majlis of the Republic of Uzbekistan. Member of the Ecological Party of Uzbekistan. |
| Navrozbek Yusupov (13 January 1982 Izboskan district, Andijan region, Uzbek SSR, USSR) is an Uzbek politician, philologist. Deputy of the Legislative Chamber of the Oliy Majlis of the Republic of Uzbekistan. Member of the Committee of Democratic Institutions, Non-Governmental Organizations and Self-Governing Bodies of Citizens. Member of the Ecological Party of Uzbekistan. |
| Olga Litvinova (2 April 1967 Tashkent, Uzbek SSR, USSR) is an Uzbek teacher and statesman. Deputy of the Legislative Chamber of the Oliy Majlis of the Republic of Uzbekistan. Member of the Committee on Science, Education, Culture and Sports. Member of the Ecological Party of Uzbekistan. |
| Leili Seitova (23 July 1970 Nukus, Republic of Karakalpakstan, UzSSR, USSR) is an Uzbek politician and economist. Deputy of the Legislative Chamber of the Oliy Majlis of the Republic of Uzbekistan on budget and economic issues. Member of the Budget and Economic Reforms Committee. Member of the Ecological Party of Uzbekistan. Candidate of Economics. Head of the Finance Department of Nukus region. |
| Mukhtar Khojimatov (22 March 1975 Namangan, Uzbek SSR, USSR) - Uzbek politician, specialist in finance and loans, state and public construction. Deputy of the Legislative Chamber of the Oliy Majlis of the Republic of Uzbekistan. Member of the Labor and Social Affairs Committee. Member of the Ecological Party of Uzbekistan. Head of the Namangan region branch of Aloqabank. |
| Nasirjon Aminov (6 March 1976 Angren, Uzbek SSR, USSR) is an Uzbek politician, civil engineer. In 2020, he was elected to the Legislative Chamber of the Oliy Majlis of the Republic of Uzbekistan of the IV convocation. Member of the Ecological Party of Uzbekistan. Member of the Committee on Agrarian and Water Management. |
| Ravshanbek Begmatov (2 March 1984 Fergana region, Uzbek SSR, USSR) is an Uzbek politician, agronomist. In 2020, he was elected to the Legislative Chamber of the Oliy Majlis of the Republic of Uzbekistan of the IV convocation. Member of the Ecological Party of Uzbekistan. Member of the Committee on Agrarian and Water Management. |

== Leaders of the Ecological Party of Uzbekistan ==
| 1 | Alikhan Boriy Batirovich | Chairman of the Committee on Development of the Aral Region and Ecology of the Senate of the Oliy Majlis of the Republic of Uzbekistan. He was the leader of the "Ecological Party of Uzbekistan" in 2019-2020. |
|---|---|---|
| 2 | Tojiboev Komiljon Sharobiddinovich | Rector of the Botanical Institute of the Academy of Sciences of Uzbekistan. In 2021, he was the leader of the "Ecological Party of Uzbekistan". |
| 3 | Oblomurodov Narzullo Naimovich | Chairman of the State Committee for Ecology and Environmental Protection of the Republic of Uzbekistan. In 2021-2022, he was the leader of the "Ecological Party of Uzbekistan". |
| 4 | Khamzaev Abdushukur Khudoykulovich | From 19 December 2022 until now, he is the leader of the "Ecological Party of Uzbekistan". |

== Electoral history ==
In the 2021 presidential election of Uzbekistan, the party nominated its candidate for the first time. Narzullo Oblomurodov, the chairman of the executive committee of the party's central council, took part in the election as a candidate. According to the results of the election, 670 thousand 641 people (4.15%) out of 16 million 212 thousand 343 voters were able to win their trust. Party leader Abdushukur Khamzayev was nominated as a presidential candidate in the 2023 extraordinary presidential election of Uzbekistan. According to the election results, Abdushukur Khamzaev won the votes of 585 thousand 711 (3.74%) people out of 15 million 651 thousand 405 voters.

=== Presidential elections ===
| Election | Party candidate | Votes | % | Votes | % | Result |
| Election | Party candidate | First round | | Second round | | Result |
|---|---|---|---|---|---|---|
| 2021 | Narzullo Oblomurodov | 670,641 | 4.15 | — | — | Lost ✗ |
| 2023 | Abdushukur Xamzayev | 585,711 | 3.77 | — | — | Lost ✗ |

=== Legislative Chamber elections ===
| Election | Seats | +/– | Position |
|---|---|---|---|
| 2009–10 | 15 / 135 | New | 5th |
| 2014–15 | 15 / 150 | Steady | 5th |
| 2019–20 | 15 / 150 | Steady | 5th |
| 2024 | 16 / 150 | ▲1 | 5th |
