= 2014–15 Uzbek parliamentary election =

- 21 December 2014 (first round); 4 January 2015 (second round)
- 135 of the 150 seats in the Legislative Chamber; 76 seats needed for a majority
- Turnout: 88.94% (first round); 76.93% (second round)
Party	Leader	Seats	+/–
OʻzLiDeP	Sodiqjon Turdiev	52	−1
Milliy Tiklanish	Shavkat Mirziyoyev	36	+4
XDP	Hotamjon Ketmonov	27	−4
ASDP	Sobir Tursunov	20	+1
Ecological Movement	Boriy Alixonov	15	0
This lists parties that won seats. See the complete results below.
Speaker before	Speaker after
Diloram Tashmukhamedova; ASDP	Nurdinjon Ismoilov; XDP

Parliamentary elections were held in Uzbekistan on 21 December 2014, with a second round on 4 January 2015, alongside provincial and district council elections. The Uzbekistan Liberal Democratic Party remained the largest party, winning 52 of the 135 elected seats in the Legislative Chamber.

== Electoral system ==
Of the 150 members of the Legislative Chamber, 135 were directly elected from single member constituencies using the two-round system. A further 15 seats were reserved for the country's Ecological Movement, which elected its members at a meeting on 21 December.

== Results ==
Of the 135 elected seats, 113 were won by candidates in the first round. The remaining 22 seats were filled when run-off elections took place on 4 January 2015.

Party	First round			Second round			Total seats	+/–
Party	Votes	%	Seats	Votes	%	Seats	Total seats	+/–
Uzbekistan Liberal Democratic Party			47			5	52	–1
Uzbekistan National Revival Democratic Party			28			8	36	+5
People's Democratic Party of Uzbekistan			21			6	27	–5
Justice Social Democratic Party			17			3	20	+1
Ecological Movement of Uzbekistan							15	0
Total			113			22	150	0
Total votes	18,490,245	–		2,642,063	–			
Registered voters/turnout	20,789,572	88.94		3,434,345	76.93			
Source: CEC, CEC
