= Nigmatilla Yuldashev =

Uzbek lawyer and politician

- Ниғматилла Йўлдошев
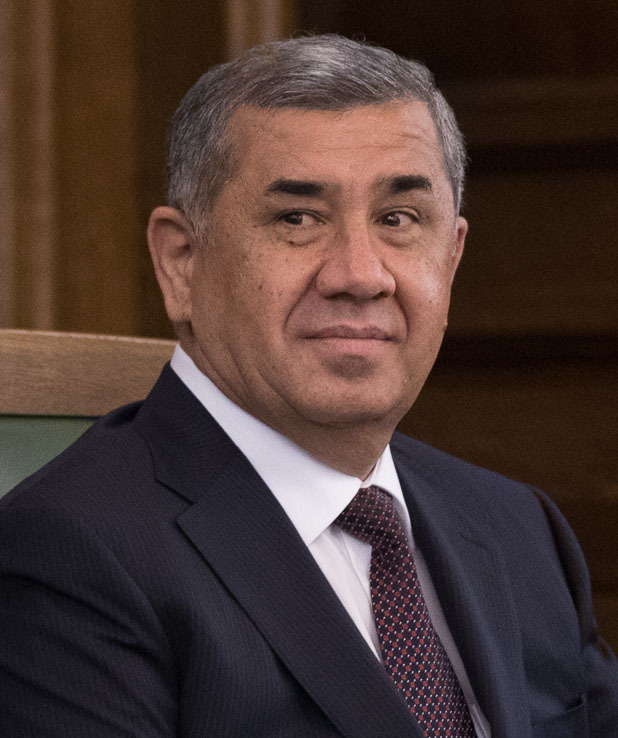
- Yuldashev in 2017

Chairman of the Senate
- In office 22 January 2015 – 21 June 2019
- Preceded by: Ilgizar Sabirov
- Succeeded by: Tanzila Norbaeva

President of Uzbekistan Acting
- In office 2 September 2016 – 8 September 2016
- Prime Minister: Shavkat Mirziyoyev
- Preceded by: Islam Karimov
- Succeeded by: Shavkat Mirziyoyev

Personal details
- Born: 5 November 1962 (age 63) Tashkent, Soviet Union
- Party: National Revival Democratic Party

Nigmatilla Tulkinovich Yuldashev (Uzbek: Ниғматилла Тўлқинович Йўлдошев, romanized: Nigʻmatilla Toʻlqinovich Yoʻldoshev; born 5 November 1962) is an Uzbek lawyer and politician who served as Chairman of the Senate of Uzbekistan from 2015 until 2019. Previously, he was Minister of Justice from 2011 to 2015.

== Biography ==
After graduating from the law department of Tashkent State University in 1985, Yuldashev joined the city prosecutor's office in Olmaliq. In 1991 he became an investigator in the Yunusabad District Prosecutor’s Office in Tashkent, later becoming a senior investigator and then a prosecutor in the Uzbekistan prosecutor’s office.

In 2000 he joined the General Prosecutor's Office as Head of Inspection of Internal Security, before becoming a member of staff in the President's office in 2003. In 2006 he was appointed as head of the Department of Tax and Money Laundering at the General Prosecutor's Office, and in 2008 he became Deputy Prosecutor General.

On 21 July 2011 he was appointed Minister of Justice as a result of presidential decree УП-4323. He served as a minister until being elected to the Senate in January 2015, after which he was elected Chairman of the Senate.

Following the death of Islam Karimov, Uzbekistan's first president, on 2 September 2016, Yuldashev would have become acting President under the terms of the constitution. However, there was no official confirmation that he had taken up the post and after a few days he proposed that Prime Minister Shavkat Mirziyoyev (seen by observers as Karimov's likely successor) take the post instead, in light of the latter's "many years of experience", and Mirziyoyev was accordingly appointed as interim President by a joint session of both houses of parliament on 8 September 2016.

Upon leaving his post as Senate Chairman, Yuldashev was appointed to the post of General Prosecutor by President Mirziyoyev.

Political offices
Preceded by Islam Karimov	President of Uzbekistan; Acting; 2016	Succeeded by Shavkat Mirziyoyev
