= Senate of Uzbekistan =

Upper house of the parliament of Uzbekistan

Senate of the Oliy Majlis of the Republic of Uzbekistan Oʻzbekiston Respublikasi Oliy Majlisi Senati (Uzbek)
- 5th Oliy Majlis
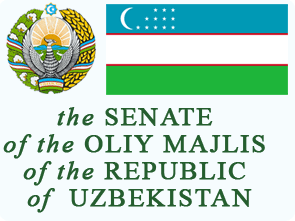

Type
- Type: Upper house of the Oliy Majlis
- Term limits: None

History
- Founded: 8 December 1994

Leadership
- Chairman: Tanzila Norbaeva since 21 June 2019

Structure
- Seats: 100 (84 indirectly elected by regional governments and 16 appointed by the president)
- Length of term: 5 years

Meeting place
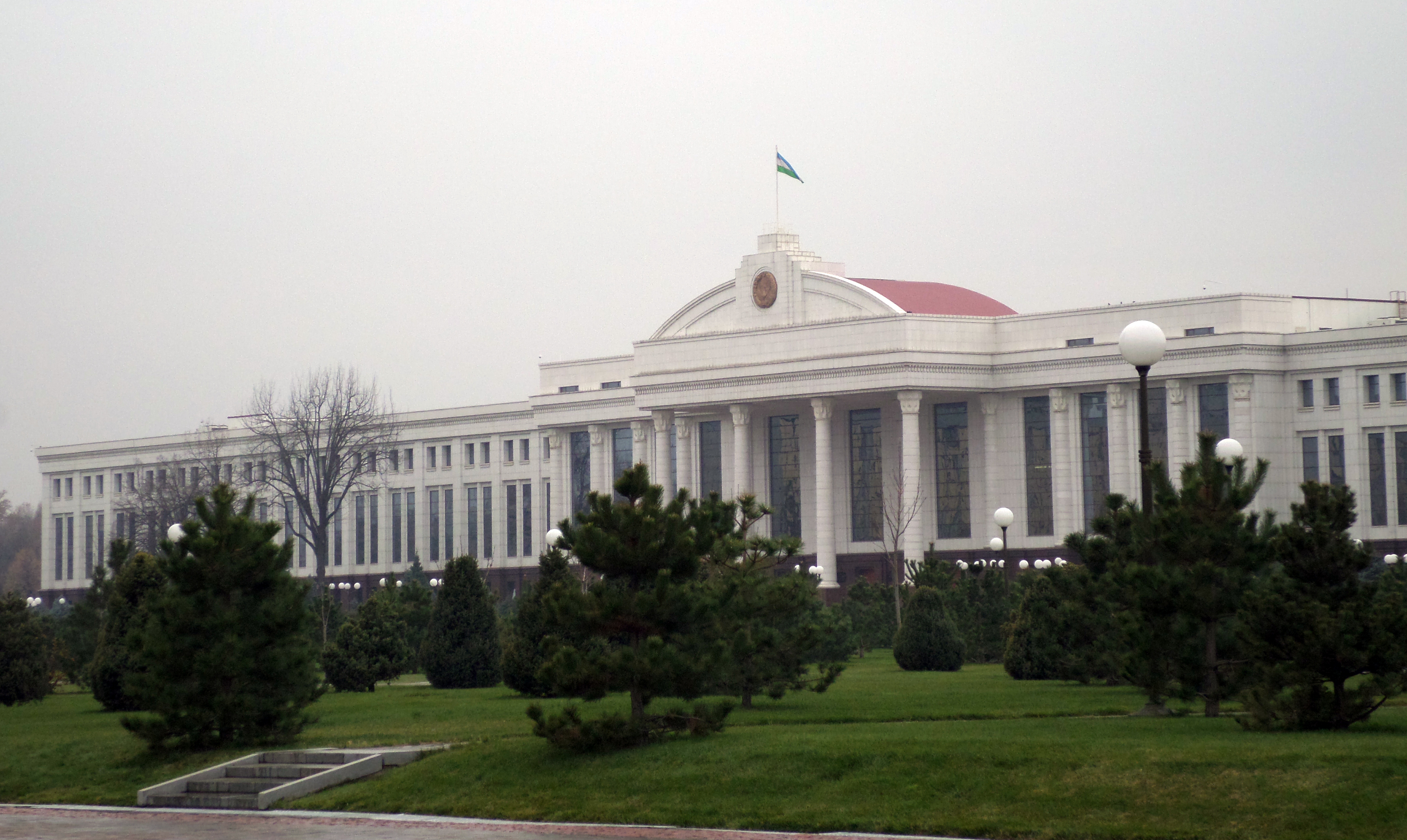
- Senate Building in Tashkent

Website
- senat.uz

The Senate (Uzbek: Senat) is the upper house of the Oliy Majlis of the Republic of Uzbekistan.

== Composition ==
The senate is composed of 100 members:

- 84 elected senators
- 16 senators appointed by the president.

== Election ==
Senators are indirectly elected by an electoral college comprising members of local councils, with the country's 14 regions consisting of 12 provinces plus the capital of Tashkent and the semi-autonomous Republic of Karakalpakstan each electing senators to fill 6 seats. Senators serve five year terms.

== Chairmen of the Senate of Uzbekistan ==
Name	Period	Notes
Murat Sharifkhodjayev	27 January 2005 – 24 February 2006	
Ilgizar Sobirov	24 February 2006 – 22 January 2015	
Nigmatilla Yuldashev	22 January 2015 – 21 June 2019	
Tanzila Norbaeva	21 June 2019 – present	
