= Dauletmurat Tazhimuratov =

Karakalpak human rights defender (born 1979)

Dauletmurat Tazhimuratov (Karakalpak: Тәжимуратов Дәўлетмурат Мырзамурат улы, romanized: Tájimuratov Dáwletmurat Mırzamurat ulı; born 27 March 1979) is a Karakalpak lawyer, journalist, and human rights defender who played a leading role in the 2022 Karakalpak protests. In January 2023, he was sentenced to 16 years imprisonment for "orchestrating mass riots" and "attempting to seize power" in what Human Rights Watch described as a politically motivated trial. In November 2023, the United Nations issued a statement calling on the Uzbek government to stop the persecution of Tazhimuratov and other defenders of minority rights. In May 2026, Tazhimuratov was sentenced to an additional five years in prison, bringing his current sentence up to 18.5 years.

== Career ==
A lawyer by profession, Tazhimuratov worked as a journalist for the Karakalpak-language newspaper El Xızmetinde (English: "At the Service of the People"), and was based in Nukus, the capital of Karakalpakstan. He was active in promoting the rights of the Karakalpaks, including importing gas to remote areas of Karakalpakstan, providing free legal advice, and financially supporting orphanages, giving him a public profile locally.

Tazhimuratov received further attention for filing lawsuits which he stated were to preserve and promote Karakalpak interests. These including lawsuits against Zo’r TV for broadcasting a programme on sex education, as well as the singer Yulduz Usmanova for public comments she made describing Karakalpaks as living "under the chapans of Uzbeks".

== 2022 Karakalpak protests ==
=== Background ===
On 26 June 2022, the President of Uzbekistan, Shavkat Mirziyayev, proposed 170 amendments to the country's constitution, to be voted on in a public referendum. This included an amendment that would significantly reduce Karakalpakstan's autonomous status within Uzbekistan, as well as another that would remove Karakalpaks' constitutional right to secede from Uzbekistan via a referendum.

=== Protests ===
On 1 July 2022, Tazhimuratov announced a peaceful protest against the proposed amendments, to be held in Nukus on 5 July, with the agreement of Murat Kamalov, the chairman of the Supreme Council of Karakalpakstan. He also voiced his intention to vote "no" on any constitutional referendum. That same day, Tazhimuratov was arrested alongside his nephew; he was released around two hours later. Later that day, Tazhimuratov was arrested again alongside his wife, children, and other relatives, prompting spontaneous protests to occur in Nukus, prompting his release. Tazhimuratov announced that his planned protest would still occur, and called on support from the United Nations and the Committee to Protect Journalists, as well as the embassies of the United States, the United Kingdom and Germany.

On 2 July 2022, Mirziyayev visited Nukus and announced he was reversing the proposed constitutional amendments that would curtail Karakalpakstan's autonomy. That same day, the Supreme Council of Karakalpakstan reported that protesters had attempted to storm government buildings. A state of emergency in the region was declared by the Uzbek government, and internet access was blocked. Protests continued, with concerns raised by opposition politicians that the issue could turn into an ethnic conflict between Karakalpaks and Uzbeks. By 4 July, following the intervention of security forces and the implementation of a curfew, the situation in Karakalpakstan was reported to have stabilised, though this led to the deaths of at least 21 protesters.

=== Arrest, trial and imprisonment ===
On 4 July 2022, Tazhimuratov was arrested for orchestrating mass riots, attempting to seize power, and distributing materials containing threats to national security, and was transported via helicopter to a prison in Khorezm Region; a further charge of causing intentional grave bodily injury was subsequently withdrawn. Tazhimuratov alleged that he had been tortured while in police custody, including being beaten with a stun gun and being stamped on the head.

Tazhimuratov was tried by a court in Bukhara alongside 21 other protesters. The prosecution claimed that speeches and statements made by Tazhimuratov had incited violent protests; his lawyer criticised the prosecution's case, noting that their expert linguistic witness could not speak Karakalpak and therefore was not able to comment on the language Tazhimuratov used. On 31 January 2023, Tazhimuratov was sentenced to 16 years in prison, the heaviest sentence given to any of the protesters.

At Tazhimuratov's trial, he was also found guilty of embezzlement, stemming from articles he had previously written, and was fined 228.8 million UZS.

=== Appeal ===
Following his conviction, Human Rights Watch released a statement describing Tazhimuratov's sentence as being similar to those experienced by human rights activists during the regime of Mirziyayev's predecessor Islam Karimov, who they said frequently sentenced activists to lengthy prison terms.

Tazhimuratov appealed his sentence before the Supreme Court of Uzbekistan in June 2023; the court upheld his conviction. The Diplomat noted that while courts had reduced the sentences of other Karakalpak protesters, that the Uzbek government had framed Tazhimuratov as being the "mastermind" behind the protests, which played a role in his harsher sentencing.

=== Life in prison ===
In September 2023 after visiting the prison, Tazhimuratov's lawyer Sergey Mayorov stated that Tazhimuratov was being kept isolated in prison; kept in a dark room with no access to sunlight; prevented from exercising, working, reading and writing; and not receiving adequate access to healthcare and food. Mayorov provided a letter Tazhimuratov had written to the ombudsman, Feruza Eshmatova, in which he compared prison conditions to that of the Khanate of Khiva.

On November 28, after visiting the prison, Mayorov stated the following: "Dauletmurat is not allowed to send letters from the colony, he is not delivered letters that are addressed to him personally. He is not given any educational talks. He is isolated from other convicts, i.e. creating an oppressive atmosphere in this institution. That is, they (administration of Navoyi colony) create additional artificial difficulties in order to destroy the spirit of this freedom-loving, truthful person - the voice of the interests of the people of Karakalpakstan."

In July 2024, Vitaliy Ponomarev, expert of the human rights center "Memorial", stated that Dauletmurat was beaten by the officers of Navayi colony. Also, Tazhimuratov said that the administration of colony doesn't allow him to send and receive letters to and from his lawyer and family.

On May 1, 2026, an Uzbekistan court found Tazhimuratov guilty of committing “actions disrupting the work of a penal institution” and sentenced him to an additional five years in prison. Already serving a 16-year sentence, the court combined his sentences to total his prison time at 18 and a half years.

== See also ==
- Aqylbek Muratov: another Karakalpak activist arrested and charged on dubious charges following the 2022 protests
