= Aqylbek Muratov =

Karakalpak activist

Aqylbek Muratov (Karakalpak: Муратов Ақылбек; born c. 1988), also known as Aqylbek Muratbai, is a Karakalpak human rights activist. Originally from Navoiy, Uzbekistan, Muratov has since become well known as a community leader within the Karakalpak diaspora living in Kazakhstan.

== Personal life ==
Muratov was born in Navoiy Region, Uzbekistan, into a Karakalpak family. As an adult, he moved to Almaty, Kazakhstan, where he worked as a computer programmer and lived with his partner, Indira Beisembaeva.

== Activism ==
In Kazakhstan, Muratov became a community leader among the Karakalpak community in the country, many of whom had fled persecution inside Uzbekistan. Wanting to strengthen ties between Karakalpaks across the country, Muratov, alongside Koshkarbai Toremuratov, established a group for the Karakalpak diaspora living in Almaty, which supported Karakalpak dissidents who wished to leave Uzbekistan, in addition to those who already were living in the country. Muratov also established a website, Karakalpak.info, which promoted Karakalpak culture, and pushed for the Uzbekistani government to preserve the Karakalpak language by publishing documents in the language. Muratov gained prominence by being one of the few Karakalpak activists who spoke English.

=== 2022 Karakalpak protests and aftermath ===
In July 2022, protests broke out across Karakalpakstan, a Sovereign Republic of Uzbekistan, over proposed amendments Shavkat Mirziyoyev, the President of Uzbekistan, wished to make to the Constitution of Uzbekistan, which would have ended Karakalpakstan's status as a Sovereign Republic, as well as removing its right to secede from Uzbekistan. In Almaty, Muratov started a petition among Karakalpaks living in Kazakhstan opposing the proposed amendments, but subsequently ended the petition following pressure from the Almaty City Mäslihat. Following the protests, a large number of Karakalpak activists fled to Kazakhstan, and Muratov gained a larger profile as a prominent Karakalpak activist. Following the protests, Muratov publicly stressed that he was not a member of any Karakalpak political parties or secessionist movements.

In October 2023, Muratov reported that he had taken part in a meeting with the Uzbekistani Consul General in Almaty, and that he had been advised to tone down his comments due to the risk that they could be misconstrued by the media; Muratov stated he had declined and asked for Uzbekistani authorities to stop pressuring Karakalpak activists. Muratov further reported that various family members, including his parents, uncle, and sister, had been interviewed by authorities in Uzbekistan due to his activism.

=== 2024 arrest ===
At around 10:00pm on 15 February 2024, Muratov was detained by local police in Almaty at the request of Uzbekistani authorities; Freedom for Eurasia later reported that the officers had been led by a police officer from Uzbekistan. The week prior, Muratov had been invited to a voluntary interview with Kazakhstani police, but had been unable to attend. Muratov's arrest came a year after four prominent Karakalpak activists had been arrested in Kazakhstan.

On 16 February, a spokesperson for the Almaty police stated that a decision to extradite Muratov to Uzbekistan was pending and that they were awaiting a decision from Kazakhstan's Prosecutor General. Local media reported that Uzbekistani authorities had accused Muratov of the "production, storage, distribution or display of materials containing a threat to public safety and public order", in breach of article 244 of Uzbekistan's Criminal Code.

On 17 February following a court appearance, Muratov was transferred to a temporary detention facility in Almaty for an initial period of 40 days. Muratov's lawyer, Inara Masanova, claimed that she had been prohibited from attending the hearing.

On 23 February, Muratov was granted asylum seeker status by the Kazakhstani government.

On 20 March, a court in Almaty extended Muratov's detention until February 2025.

==== Response ====
Freedom for Eurasia issued a statement on 15 February 2024 condemning Muratov's arrest and calling on Kazakhstani authorities to protect his "fundamental rights" and to immediately release him. Front Line Defenders accused the Uzbekistani government of targeting Muratov due to his human rights work. The Kazakhstan International Bureau for Human Rights and Rule of Law announced that they would provide Muratov with legal assistance to fight against his extradition. UN Special Rapporteur Mary Lawlor called on Uzbekistan to provide Aqylbek Muratbai with a lawyer and release him.

== See also ==
- Dauletmurat Tazhimuratov: another Karakalpak activist arrested and charged on dubious charges following the 2022 protests
