= Constitution of Karakalpakstan =

Constitution of Karakalpakstan Qaraqalpaqstan Respublikasınıń Konstituciyası Qoraqalpogʻiston Respublikasining Konstitutsiyasi

Supreme Council of Karakalpakstan
- Territorial extent: Karakalpakstan
- Passed by: Supreme Council of Karakalpakstan
- Passed: February 26, 1994
- Enacted: April 9, 1993

Related legislation
- Constitution of Uzbekistan
- Status: In force

The Constitution of Karakalpakstan (Karakalpak: Qaraqalpaqstan Respublikasınıń Konstituciyası, Қарақалпақстан Республикасының Конституциясы, Uzbek: Qoraqalpogʻiston Respublikasining Konstitutsiyasi, Қорақалпоғистон Республикасининг Конституцияси) is the fundamental legal document that governs the Republic of Karakalpakstan, an autonomous republic within Uzbekistan. It operates within the framework of Constitution of Uzbekistan and national laws, ensuring the region's self-governance while maintaining alignment with the central government.

The Constitution defines Karakalpakstan as a sovereign democratic republic, outlines the rights of its citizens, and guarantees its autonomy, including the right to hold referendums on matters of independence. It also establishes Karakalpakstan's state symbols, official languages, and administrative structure, emphasizing human rights, democracy, and social justice.

The Constitution has evolved over time, following political developments in the region's history, including its brief declaration of independence in 1991 and subsequent reunification with Uzbekistan in 1992 under an agreement that allowed for the constitutional right of secession. However, recent amendments proposed by Uzbekistan's government in 2022, and subsequently dropped, raised concerns about the potential erosion of Karakalpakstan's autonomy, sparking 2022 Karakalpak protests.

== History ==
Following the establishment of the Soviet Union, the process of boundary delimitation took place under Joseph Stalin in Central Asia by the local communist organizations under the influence of ethnic nationalist intellectuals and were made on the basis of late Tsarist and early Soviet census data. As new borders were drawn, bilingualism and multinational identities in the areas were common while the divisions of language and ethnicity was often seen by the urban–rural political divide. The Karakalpak Autonomous Oblast was formed in 1925 within the Kazakh Autonomous Socialist Soviet Republic and was transferred to the Russian Soviet Federative Socialist Republic where in 1932, it became the Karakalpak Autonomous Soviet Socialist Republic and was fully integrated into the Uzbek Soviet Socialist Republic in 1936 where it retained its status quo as an autonomy.

In December 1990, the Supreme Council of the Karakalpak Autonomous Soviet Socialist Republic, then part of the Uzbek SSR, issued a Declaration on State Sovereignty. This declaration introduced the possibility of Karakalpakstan pursuing independence from the Uzbek SSR and potentially from the Soviet Union, contingent on approval by the citizens of Karakalpakstan through a referendum. In 1991, Karakalpakstan proclaimed its independence from the Soviet Union, but in 1992, it rejoined Uzbekistan under the agreement that it would maintain its autonomy. In 1993, Karakalpakstan entered into a 20-year reunification agreement with the central government in Tashkent, which secured the republic's constitutional right to hold a referendum on secession from Uzbekistan. The agreement stipulated that after 20 years, the parties would either extend the agreement or the Karakalpaks would have the opportunity to vote on independence. However, no referendum was held in 2013.

On June 27, 2022, President Shavkat Mirziyoyev proposed constitutional amendments to the Constitution of Uzbekistan itself. Uzbekistan then initiated constitutional amendments that included eliminating the terms "sovereign" and the right of secession for Karakalpakstan. The proposed changes sparked discontent among Karakalpaks, who protested both online and in the streets, with authorities responding by limiting internet access and restricting discussions. Mirziyoyev later announced the withdrawal of the proposed changes to the constitution.

== Content ==
=== Preamble ===
The preamble of the Constitution of the Republic of Karakalpakstan declares the people's commitment to human rights, Karakalpak state sovereignty, democracy, and social justice. The preamble sets goals of establishing a humane, democratic, and lawful state that ensures dignity, civil peace, and national unity for all citizens.

=== Chapters ===
The Constitution of Karakalpakstan defines it as a sovereign democratic republic within Uzbekistan, with Nukus as its capital. It guarantees the region's right to self-governance and outlines citizens' fundamental rights, including equality, freedom of expression, movement, and religious belief. Karakalpakstan maintains its own state symbols, official languages (Karakalpak and Uzbek), and an administrative structure aligned with Uzbekistan's constitution.

== See also ==
- Constitutional Court of Uzbekistan
- Constitution of Uzbekistan
