= Boʻritosh Mustafoyev =

Uzbek lawyer and politician

Buritosh Mustafayev

Prosecutor General of Uzbekistan
- In office 1990–1998
- Preceded by: position established
- Succeeded by: Usmon Xudoyqulov

Personal details
- Born: January 2, 1949 Samarkand Region
- Died: May 12, 2017 (aged 68) Tashkent

Buritosh Mustafayev (Uzbek: Bo'ritosh Mustafoyev; January 2, 1949, Khatyrchi District, Samarkand Region, Uzbek SSR — April 12, 2017, Tashkent, Uzbekistan) was an Uzbek statesman, Prosecutor General (1990–1998) and Minister of Justice of Uzbekistan (2005–2006). Chairman of the Constitutional (2002–2004) and Supreme (2006–2014) Courts of Uzbekistan.

== Biography ==
Born into a working-class family. In 1965–1966 he worked as a milling cutter at the Tashkent Excavator Plant. In 1971 he graduated from the Law Faculty of Tashkent State University. He was sent to the Samarkand Regional Prosecutor's Office for the position of prosecutor of the investigative department. From 1973 to 1985 he worked in various positions in the Prosecutor's office of Samarkand region. From 1985 to 1989 he was the prosecutor of Andijan Region, from 1989 to 1990 – Deputy Prosecutor General of Uzbekistan. From 1990 to 1998 he was the Prosecutor General of the Republic of Uzbekistan, From 2006 to 2014 – Chairman of the Supreme Court of Uzbekistan. He died on April 12, 2017. He was buried at the Chigatai cemetery.
