= 2023 Uzbek presidential election =

- 9 July 2023
- Registered: 19,593,838
- Turnout: 79.88% (▼0.54pp)
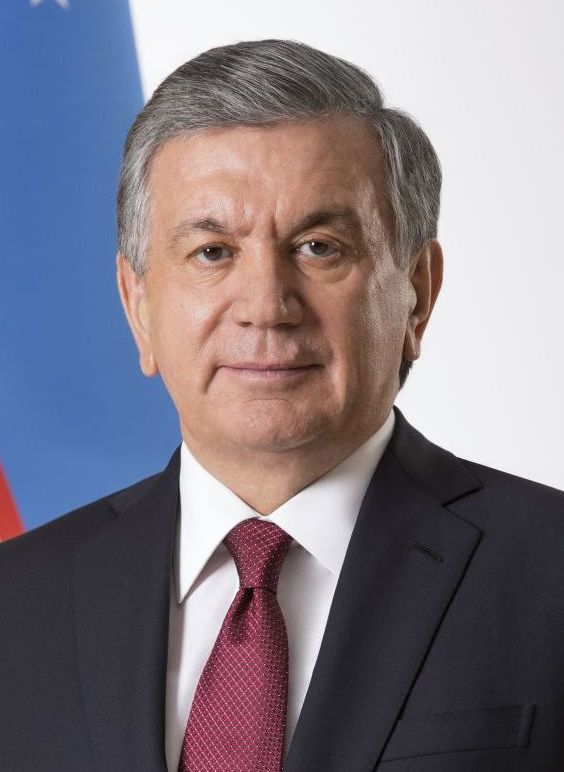
Nominee	Shavkat Mirziyoyev	Robakhon Makhmudova
Party	Independent	ASDP
Popular vote	13,625,055	693,634
Percentage	87.71%	4.47%
President before election
Shavkat Mirziyoyev
OʻzLiDeP
Elected President
Shavkat Mirziyoyev
Independent (OʻzLiDeP/MTDP)

Early presidential elections were held in Uzbekistan on 9 July 2023. The early election was called after the approval of the constitutional referendum where term limits were reset and president Shavkat Mirziyoyev can serve two more seven-year terms.

== Background ==
A constitutional referendum was held in Uzbekistan on 30 April 2023. It was held on proposed constitutional amendments.

Parliament approved the referendum on 15 March 2023. The amendments were accepted in the referendum with over 90% in support, which will allow Mirziyoyev to be president for two further terms if re-elected.

The Uzbekistan legislation requires at least 33% of eligible voters to take part in the presidential elections, otherwise, the elections will be pronounced invalid. The law also provides for a second round if none of the candidates receives more than 50% of the vote. In practice, neither of these events have yet occurred, as every presidential election winner since the country's independence in 1991 has won with over 80% of the vote on a turnout of over 79%, and each incumbent standing for re-election has been re-elected.

== Candidates ==
Name, birth year and party	Political offices	Registration date
Abdushukur Xamzayev (1973); Ecological Party	Chairman of the Executive Committee of the Central Council of the Ecological Party of Uzbekistan (since 2022); Deputy Chairman of the Executive Committee of the Central Council of the Ecological Party (since 2023)	11 May 2023
Ulugbek Inoyatov (1962); O‘XDP	Minister of National Education (2013–2018); Chairman of O‘XDP (since 2019)	12 May 2023
Robaxon Maxmudova (1968); Adolat	First Deputy Chairwoman of the Supreme Court of Uzbekistan (since 2020)	12 May 2023
Shavkat Mirziyoyev (1957); Independent (suggested by O‘zLiDeP and Milliy Tiklanish)	President of Uzbekistan (since 2016); Prime Minister of Uzbekistan (2003–2016)	12 May 2023

== Conduct ==
The Office for Democratic Institutions and Human Rights (ODIHR) said that the elected "lacked genuine political competition despite some efforts to reform." Their report mentioned "indications of ballot box stuffing as well as numerous observations of seemingly identical signatures on the voter lists," noting that "None of the registered candidates publicly criticized the current president or presented alternative political views and the campaign remained low key throughout, with observers noting that events often appeared orchestrated." The mission did, however, highly appreciate preparations for presidential elections.

== Results ==
Uzbekistan’s President Shavkat Mirziyoyev was re-elected with 88% of the vote. The preliminary results of the presidential elections were announced at a briefing by the chairman of the Central Election Commission of Uzbekistan, Zainiddin Nizamkhojaev. More than 15 million voters participated in elections.

Candidate	Party	Votes	%
Shavkat Mirziyoyev	Independent	13,625,055	87.71
Robaxon Maxmudova	Justice Social Democratic Party	693,634	4.47
Ulugbek Inoyatov	People's Democratic Party	629,116	4.05
Abdushukur Xamzayev	Ecological Party of Uzbekistan	585,711	3.77
Total		15,533,516	100.00
Valid votes		15,533,516	99.25
Invalid/blank votes		117,889	0.75
Total votes		15,651,405	100.00
Registered voters/turnout		19,593,838	79.88
Source: CEC

== International reactions ==
- Kazakhstan: President Kassym-Jomart Tokayev of Kazakhstan was the first to congratulate his colleague on the victory. President Tokayev described the results of the presidential election as proof of people’s support of the current Uzbek president’s political course aimed at ensuring the sustainable growth, stability and prosperity of Uzbekistan, the president’s press service said.
- Russia: Russian President Vladimir Putin on Monday congratulated Mirziyoyev in a message published on the Kremlin website. "This convincing electoral victory confirms your high political authority and points to the broad, popular support for your policy of large-scale reforms," Putin said.
- China: President and General Secretary of the Communist Party Xi Jinping also offered congratulations as well as praise for Mirziyoyev's leadership. "I am willing to work with you to promote the continuous development of the China-Uzbekistan comprehensive strategic partnership and inject new impetus into the construction of a China-Uzbekistan community with a shared future".
