= 2022 Karakalpak protests =

- Karakalpakstan (red) within Uzbekistan (red and white)
- Date: 1–3 July 2022
- Location: Nukus, Uzbekistan
- Caused by: Submission for public discussion of a draft of a new version of the Constitution of Uzbekistan, in which the word "sovereign" was removed from the description of the status of the Republic of Karakalpakstan, and the mention of the republic's right to secede from Uzbekistan was also removed; Arrest of Dauletmurat Tazhimuratov
- Methods: Demonstrations, civil unrest, online activism
- Result: Constitutional reforms regarding Karakalpakstan withdrawn
- Concessions: Amendments regarding removal of Karakalpak autonomy withdrawn

Parties
Karakalpakstan protesters	Government of Uzbekistan; State Security Service; Ministry of the Interior; Uzbekistan Police; Armed Forces of the Republic of Uzbekistan; Uzbekistan National Guard; Supreme Council of Karakalpakstan

Lead figures
(Karakalpakstan) Dauletmurat Tazhimuratov	(Uzbekistan) Shavkat Mirziyoyev

Casualties
- Deaths: 21 (Uzbek government claim)
- Injuries: 243 (Uzbek government claim) "Thousands" (Karakalpak government claim)
- Detained: 516

Protests broke out in the autonomous region of Karakalpakstan in Republic of Uzbekistan on 1 July 2022 over proposed amendments by Shavkat Mirziyoyev, the Uzbek President, to the Constitution of Uzbekistan, which would have ended Karakalpakstan's status as an autonomous region of Uzbekistan and right to secede from Uzbekistan via referendum. A day after protests had begun in the Karakalpak capital of Nukus, President Mirziyoyev withdrew the constitutional amendments. The Karakalpak government said that protesters had attempted to storm government buildings.

Despite concessions given by the Uzbek government in preserving Karakalpakstan's autonomy, protests continued growing, resulting in internet blockage throughout Karakalpakstan on 2 July, and President Mirziyoyev declaring a state of emergency in the region. The protests were quelled by the morning of 3 July. The state of emergency was lifted on 21 July.

== Background ==
Karakalpakstan is a large autonomous republic located in western Uzbekistan. It is home to ethnic Karakalpaks, a Turkic people who speak a language closer to Kazakh than to Uzbek. Despite the geographic size of their republic, Karakalpaks number just 752,000, 2.2% of Uzbekistan's population. Throughout the course of history, the territory of Karakalpakstan had been under control of various empires before forming its own present-day identity in around the 17th century as a separate confederation of nomadic tribes initially belonging to Khiva khanate, thus resulting in Karakalpaks having closer cultural ties with the Kazakhs in terms of customs, material culture, and language contrary with the Uzbeks.

Following the establishment of the Soviet Union, the process of boundary delimitation took place under Joseph Stalin in Central Asia by the local communist organizations under the influence of ethnic nationalist intellectuals and were made on the basis of late Tsarist and early Soviet census data. As new borders were drawn, bilingualism and multinational identities in the areas were common while the divisions of language and ethnicity was often seen by the urban–rural political divide. The Karakalpak Autonomous Oblast was formed in 1925 within the Kazakh Autonomous Socialist Soviet Republic and was transferred to the Russian Soviet Federative Socialist Republic where in 1932, it became the Karakalpak Autonomous Soviet Socialist Republic and was fully integrated into the Uzbek Soviet Socialist Republic in 1936 where it retained its status quo as an autonomy.

In December 1990, during Perestroika, the Supreme Council of Karakalpak ASSR adopted a "Declaration on State Sovereignty" over the Soviet Union which it allowed for Karakalpakstan to gain independence through the means of a referendum while the Uzbek SSR had declared its own independence in August 1991 shortly after the failed Soviet coup d'état attempt. By that time, Karakalpakstan was recognized by the central Soviet government as holding a "state status" and, in November 1991, Dauletbay Shamshetov was elected the first president of Karakalpakstan by the Supreme Council before eventually stepping down in June 1992. After the dissolution of the Soviet Union took place, the Republic of Karakalpakstan was formed in January 1992, and subsequently became an autonomous republic under the Uzbek authority the adoption of the Constitution of Uzbekistan in December 1992. In 1993, a 20-year period interstate agreement on the entry of the Republic of Karakalpakstan into Uzbekistan was signed by both governments which granted the right of Karakalpakstan to secede from Uzbekistan through a referendum. By the time the agreement expired in 2013, it was largely forgotten.

=== Draining of the Aral Sea ===
The Aral Sea was historically a part of Karakalpak culture, and the region is commonly associated with its draining. As a result of the draining of the Aral Sea, Karakalpakstan became one of Uzbekistan's poorest regions, and living conditions have worsened as a result of decreased access to drinking water and the spread of infectious disease. The continued decreasing habitability of Karakalpakstan as a result of the Aral Sea's draining has also caused a significant decrease in economic opportunities, and many within the region have blamed the draining for the worsening situation in the region.

=== Proposed constitutional reform ===
In late June 2022, President of Uzbekistan Shavkat Mirziyoyev proposed 170 amendments to the constitution of Uzbekistan, to be voted on in a referendum. Among the most controversial amendments were an amendment changing the length of a presidential term from five to seven years, as well as a removal of term limits, and amendments which would significantly decrease Karakalpakstan's autonomy, including removing their right to secede from Uzbekistan via referendum.

== Protests ==
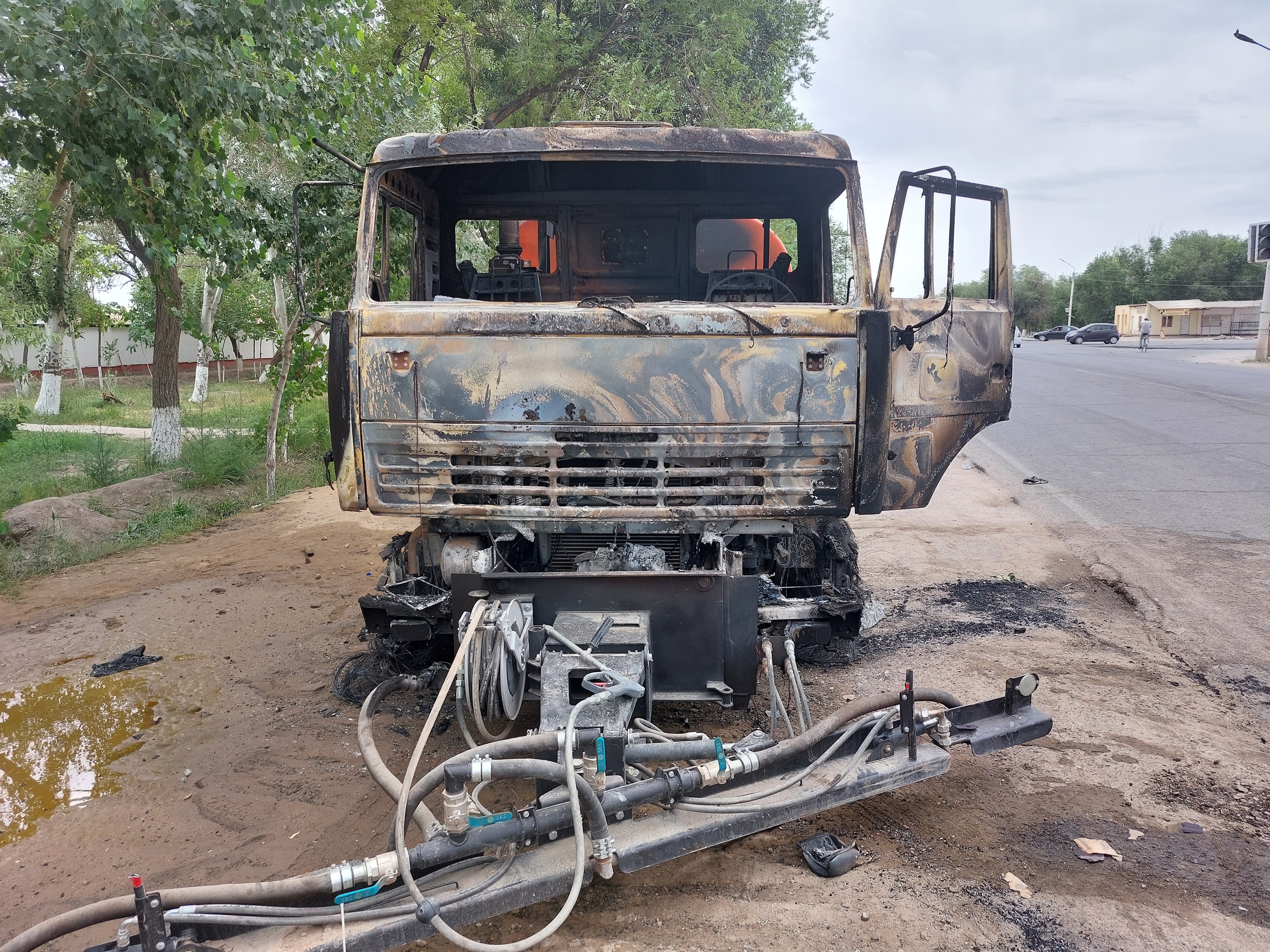
Burned-out street sweeper in Nukus on 3 July 2022

On 1 July 2022, thousands of people protested against the proposed constitutional amendments in the Karakalpak capital of Nukus and throughout the region. The news outlet Turkmen.News reported that the Uzbekistan National Guard presence had been strengthened in two towns in Karakalpakstan as a result of protests. The cause of other protests was reported by Eurasianet to be the arrest of Dauletmurat Tazhimuratov, a Karakalpak lawyer and journalist, before he was set to meet people in Nukus.

The day after protests, Mirziyoyev agreed to withdraw the amendments to the constitution regarding Karakalpakstan's autonomy. At the same time, the government of Karakalpakstan claimed that protesters had attempted to storm government buildings. Internet access in Karakalpakstan was subsequently blocked, and a state of emergency was declared in the region by the Uzbek government.

By 4 July 2022, opposition politician Pulat Ahunov noted that the situation appeared to have stabilised following the state of emergency and the imposition of a curfew by the government of Uzbekistan, but simultaneously expressed concerns that the unrest could escalate into an ethnic conflict between Uzbeks and Karakalpaks, saying "Overall, I think that the situation is starting to stabilise, but there is another kind of danger. There have been incidents of ethnic clashes between the Karakalpaks and the Uzbeks. ... It will not be about the status of Karakalpakstan, it will be about a conflict between the Karakalpaks and the Uzbeks."

Through the weekend of 1–2 July 2022, Mirziyoyev visited Karakalpakstan twice, and publicly castigated Karakalpak pro-government figures for not telling him about public opposition to the laws beforehand. Following a 4 July meeting with Karakalpak deputies, he claimed that the leaders of the protests had attempted to take control of local government buildings to obtain weaponry, also saying, "Taking advantage of their numerical superiority, these men attacked law enforcement officers, severely beating them and inflicting severe injuries." According to Mirziyoyev, he held a meeting with President of the European Council Charles Michel in which an independent investigation into the unrest was discussed. He once again blamed "criminal gangs" for violence.

=== Casualties ===
There have been widespread concerns regarding the possibility of many casualties as a result of the protests. President Mirziyoyev has admitted that casualties have occurred among both civilians and security forces, claiming that rioters had carried out "destructive actions". Pulat Ahunov told Reuters that at least five people have died.

Sultanbek Ziyayev, minister of health in Karakalpakstan, said Nukus hospitals were filled with protesters who had been injured in clashes with security forces, and that "thousands" had been hospitalised.

On 4 July, the General Prosecutor's Office of Uzbekistan reported that 18 people had been killed and 243 injured in Nukus, though opposition figures have stated the true number is likely far higher. On 18 July, the Prosecutor's Office announced that three more people had died in hospital. Uzbekistan National Guard spokesperson Davron Jumanazarov stated that a total of 516 people had been detained on 1–2 July.

According to Amnesty International, security forces allegedly fired rubber bullets into the crowd and there were unverified reports of drones dropping smoke bombs and tear gas on the protesters. Amnesty International said authorities had confirmed the use of smoke bombs and tear gas.

A video circulated on social media purportedly showed a large amount of blood on the street in Nukus. It was later claimed by local media that the red colour in the video was the result of red-dye water cannons sprayed by police. However, Amnesty International has noted that it remains impossible to verify the video and whether or not it was blood, as a result of internet blackouts. Polish journalist Agnieszka Pikulicka also shared the video but later apologized for spreading fake news. According to Reuters, the protests were the deadliest since the 2005 Andijan massacre, in which 173 were killed according to government estimates.

== Trial ==
On 31 January 2023, a court sentenced twenty-two people to various prison terms for charges from hooliganism to encroachment of the constitution. All charges stemmed from the protests, with the heaviest sentence being that of 16 years in prison for a lawyer.

== Reactions ==
- Belarus – In a meeting leading up to Belarus' Independence Day, President Alexander Lukashenko said that foreigners, mainly Westerners, were playing a role in the demonstrations and drew similarities between the protests and the 2022 Kazakh unrest. In reference to China's influence in the region, Lukashenko stated "Central Asia, just like us, is caught between two fires: Europeans and Americans on one side and China on the other. China is helping Central Asia to survive, to hold out. This fight will be in Central Asia in the near future. The symptoms of this have already become evident."
- China – At a press briefing, Ministry of Foreign Affairs of China spokesperson Zhao Lijian stated that China supports the Uzbek government in maintaining national stability, and that Uzbekistan will maintain tranquility and unity under the leadership of President Mirziyoyev.
- European Union – The European Union expressed concern at the events in Karakalpakstan, urging for all sides to display restraint and saying, "The European Union urges the authorities to guarantee human rights, including the fundamental rights to freedom of expression and freedom of assembly, in line with Uzbekistan's international commitments."
- India – Ministry of External Affairs of India spokesperson Arindam Bagchi issued a statement supporting Uzbek government's efforts to restore law and order, and prevent any further escalation of the situation. He also offered condolences to those who have deceased in the protests.
- Kazakhstan – The Kazakh Ministry of Foreign Affairs issued a statement in support of the Uzbek government. It said "We welcome and support the decisions of the highest leadership of Uzbekistan to stabilize the situation in Karakalpakstan. We are confident that peace and tranquility will reign in fraternal Uzbekistan on the eve of the most important political event – the referendum on amendments to the Constitution."
- Kyrgyzstan – In a telephone call with President Mirziyoyev, President of Kyrgyzstan Sadyr Japarov said that he fully supports Uzbek government's efforts to stabilize the situation in Karakalpakstan.
- Russia – The Ministry of Foreign Affairs of Russia stated that the matter was an Uzbek domestic affair, but expressed confidence in Uzbek authorities, and called on involved parties to solve concerns via "legal means" rather than rioting.
- Turkey – The Turkish Foreign Ministry expressed confidence that the Uzbek government and people will resolve the issues with "common sense and in an atmosphere of peace and tranquility." The foreign ministry also stated that they attach great importance to the stability and prosperity of Uzbekistan.
- Turkmenistan – The Ministry of Foreign Affairs of Turkmenistan issued a statement saying that it "supports the timely and decisive actions of the leadership of Uzbekistan to protect the constitutional order and the rule of law in the country, the safety and tranquility of residents."
- United States – US State Department spokesman Ned Price urged Uzbek authorities to "protect all fundamental rights, including peaceful assembly and expression" and called for an investigation into the violence.

== See also ==
- Separatism in Uzbekistan
- Karakalpak Autonomous Soviet Socialist Republic
- 2010 South Kyrgyzstan ethnic clashes
- Fergana massacre
- Andijan massacre
