= Subdivisions of Uzbekistan =

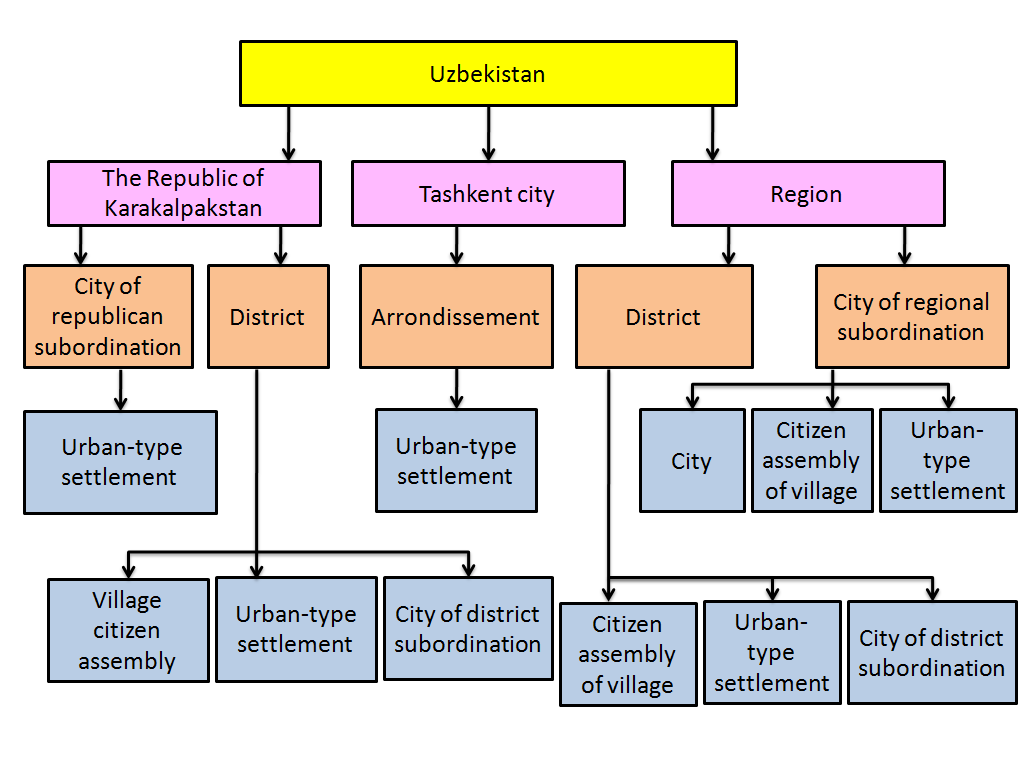
Subdivisions of Uzbekistan

This article discusses the administrative-territorial division of the Republic of Uzbekistan. The Article 68 of the constitution of Uzbekistan defines:

The Republic of Uzbekistan shall consist of regions, districts, cities, towns, settlements, kishlaks and auls (villages) in Uzbekistan and the Republic of Karakalpakstan.

== Divisions ==
The top level is formed by the regions (Uzbek: viloyat, вилоят, plural viloyatlar), the autonomous republic of Karakalpakstan and the independent city of Tashkent. The regions Karakalpakstan and Tashkent are further divided into districts (Uzbek: tuman, туман, plural tumanlar) and cities of regional subordination. The districts are divided into cities of district subordination, urban-type settlements (Uzbek: shaharcha, шаҳарча) and citizen assemblies of villages (Uzbek: qishloq fuqarolar yig'ini, қишлоқ фуқаролар йиғини).

As of 2021, there is one autonomous republic, 12 regions and one independent city:

| Region | Districts | Cities |
|---|---|---|
| Karakalpakstan (aut. rep.) | 16 | 12 |
| Andijan Region | 14 | 11 |
| Bukhara Region | 11 | 11 |
| Jizzakh Region | 12 | 6 |
| Qashqadaryo Region | 13 | 12 |
| Navoiy Region | 8 | 7 |
| Namangan Region | 12 | 8 |
| Samarqand Region | 14 | 11 |
| Surxondaryo Region | 14 | 8 |
| Sirdaryo Region | 8 | 5 |
| Tashkent Region | 15 | 16 |
| Fergana Region | 15 | 9 |
| Xorazm Region | 11 | 3 |
| Tashkent (city) | 12 | 1 |
| Total | 175 | 120 |

Of the 120 cities, one is of republican subordination (Tashkent), 31 are of regional subordination and 88 are of district subordination. There are 1,067 urban-type settlements.

== History ==
=== Pre-history ===
Before the October Revolution, the territory of modern Uzbekistan was divided between the Trans-Caspian, Samarkand, Syrdarya, and Ferghana regions of the Russian Empire, as well as between its vassal possessions—the Bukhara Emirate and the Khanate of Khiva. After the establishment of Soviet power in Turkestan in 1918, the territory of present-day Uzbekistan (except for the territories of the Bukhara Emirate and the Khiva Khanate) was merged into the Turkestan ASSR with a center set in Tashkent. In 1920, Soviet power was established in Bukhara and Khiva, which led to the Bukhara and Khorezm People's Republics being established. Later, the Khorezm People's Soviet Republic was transformed into Soviet Socialist Republic on October 30, 1923 followed by the establishment of the Bukhara People's Soviet Socialist Republic on September 19, 1924.

On September 16, 1924, an extraordinary session of the Central Electoral Commission of the Turkestan ASSR ruled to go forward with the national-state delimitation. This implied the establishment of the Uzbek SSR as part of the USSR. It comprised part of the lands of the former Samarkand, Semirechye and Ferghana Oblasts, as well as the Bukhara and Khorezm SSRs abolished at that time. This decision was put forward by the 2nd session of the All-Russian Central Executive Committee on October 14, 1924 and later approved by the 12th All-Russian Congress of Soviets on May 11, 1925. The date of foundation of the Uzbek SSR is considered October 27, 1924. Its center became Samarkand. Moreover, the Tajik Autonomous Soviet Socialist Republic was formed as part of the Uzbek SSR.

=== 1924–1938 ===
In 1925, oblasts were introduced in the Uzbek SSR. The oblasts were dividend into uyezds, and those, in turn, were divided into volosts. As of January 1, 1926, the administrative-territorial division of the Uzbek SSR were as follows:

| Oblasts | Uyezds |
|---|---|
| Zeravshan | Bukhara, Gidzhuvan, Kermin, Nur-Ata |
| Kashka-Darya | Bekbud, Guzar, Shakhrisyabz |
| Samarkand | Jizzakh, Katta-Kurgan, Samarkand, Khodzhent |
| Surkhan-Darya | Baysun, Shirabad, Yurchin |
| Tashkent | Mirza-Chul, Tashkent |
| Ferghana | Andijan, Kokand, Namangan, Ferghana, Kaniabadam district |
| Khorezm | Gurlen, New-Urgench, Khiva, Shurakhan |
| Tajik ASSR | Gorno-Badakhshan, Garm, Dyushambe, Kulyab, Kurgan-Tyubin, Penjikent, Ura-Tyubin viloyats |
| Kenimeh District having region's rights | no |

However, oblasts and uyezds were abolished in the same year. Instead, they were converted into 10 okrugs: Andijan, Bukhara, Zeravshan, Kashka-Darya, Samarkand, Surkhan-Darya, Tashkent, Ferghana, Khodjent and Khorezm. The okrugs were further divided into rayons (analogous to districts).

In 1929, the Tajik Autonomous Soviet Socialist Republic and the Khodjent Okrug withdrew from the Uzbek SSR to become the Tajik SSR. This decision was approved by the CEC of the USSR on December 5, 1929.

In 1930, Tashkent became the capital of the Uzbek SSR. In the same year, all okrugs, as elsewhere in the Soviet Union, were abolished, and their constituent territories were transferred to the direct subordination of the soviet republic. In 1931, there were 71 rayons (districts) in the Uzbek SSR (which were divided into 1494 village councils) and 9 cities of republican subordination (which managed another 204 village councils).

In 1935, some of the rayons of the Uzbek SSR were merged into Kashka-Darya Okrug.

On December 5, 1936, the Kara-Kalpak ASSR was transferred to the Uzbek SSR from the RSFSR.

=== 1938–1987 ===
On January 15, 1938, the Uzbek SSR underwent again some transformations to comprise the newly established Bukhara (including Surkhan-Darya Okrug), Samarkand, Tashkent, Ferghana and Khorezm Oblasts.

According to data on October 1, 1938, the administrative-territorial division of Uzbekistan were as follows:

| Oblasts | Rayons and cities of regional subordination |
|---|---|
| Bukhara | Beshkent, Bukhara, Wabkent, Gidzhuvan, Guzar, Dekhkanabad, Kagan, Kamashin, Karakul, Karshi, Kassan, Kenimekh, Kerminin, Kzyl-Tepa, Kitab, Rometan, Sverdlovsk, Chirakchin, Shafrikan, Shakhrisabz, Yakkabag, Bukhara city, Gijuvan city, Kagan city, Karshi city, Shakhrisyabz city |
| Surkhan-Darya Okrug as part of the Bukhara region | Baysun, Denausky, Dzhar-Kurgan, Sary-Assiya, Termez, Shirabad, Shurchi, Termez city |
| Samarkand | Ak-Daryin, Bulungur, Galla-Aral, Dzhambay, Zaamin, Kara-Darya, Katta-Kurgan, Mitan, Narpay, Nurata, Pai-Aryk, Past-Dargomy, Pakhtakor, Samarkand, Urgut, Farish, Khatyrchi, Samarkand city, Jizzakh city, Katta-Kurgan city |
| Tashkent | Ak-Kurgan, Akhan-Garan, Begovat, Upper Chirchik, Kalinin, Mirzachul, Lower-Chirchik, Ordzhonikidze, Parkent, Pskent, Mid-Chirchik, Havast, Chianz, Yangi-Yulsky, Tashkent city, Chirchik city, Yangi-Yul city |
| Ferghana | Aim, Alty-Aryk, Andijan, Baghdat, Balykchi, Voroshilov, Jalal-Kuduk, Izbaskent, Kaganovich, Kassan-Say, Kirov, Kokand, Kuybyshev, Lenin, Margelan, Markhamat, Molotov, Namangan, Narin, Pap, Pakhta-Abad, Stalin, Tashlak, Tyur-Kurgan, Uychin, Uch-Kurgan, Ferghana, Khoji-Abad, Chust, Yangi-Kurgan, Fergana city, Andijan city, Kokand city, Leninsk city, Margelan city, Namangan city, Chust city |
| Khorezm | Gurlen, Kosh-Kupyr, Mangit, Urgench, Khazarasp, Hankin, Khiva, Shavat, Yangi-Aryk, Urgench city, Khiva city |
| Kara-Kalpak Autonomous Soviet Socialist Republic | Kara-Uzyak, Kegeilin, Kipchak, Kuibyshev, Kungrad, Muynak, Tamdyn, Takhta-Kupyr, Turtkul, Khodzheilyn, Chimbay, Shabbaz, Turtkul city, Nukus city, Khojeyli city, Chimbay city |

On March 6, 1941, Andijan and Namangan were taken off the Fergana Oblast to become separate regions, and the Surkhan-Darya Okrug was transformed into the Surkhan-Darya Oblast. On January 20, 1943 part of the Bukhara Oblast was withdrawn to enter a part of the Kashka-Darya Oblast. As a result, by January 1, 1947, the administrative-territorial division of the Uzbek SSR became as follows:

| Oblasts | Rayons and cities of regional subordination |
|---|---|
| Andijan | Aim, Altyn-Kul, Andijan, Balykchi, Voroshilov, Jalal-Kuduk, Izbaskent, Lenin, Markhamat, Pakhtaabad, Stalin, Khaldyvanbek, Khojiabad, Chinabad, Andijan city, Lenin city |
| Bukhara | Alat, Bukhara, Wabkent, Gidzhuvan, Kagan, Karakul, Kenymekh, Kermin, Kzyl-Tepa, Rometan, Sverdlovsk, Tamdyn, Shafrikan, Bukhara, Gijuvan, Kagan |
| Kashka-Darya | Beshkent, Guzar, Dekhkanabad, Kamashin, Karshi, Kassan, Kitab, Kok-Bulak, Mirakin, Chirakchi, Shakhrisyabz, Yakkabag, Karshi city, Shakhrisyabz city |
| Namangan | Kassansai, Namangan, Naryn, Papal, Tyuria-Kurgan, Uychin, Uch-Kurgan, Chust, Yangi-Kurgan, Namangan city, Chust city |
| Samarkand | Ak-Darya, Bulungur, Galla-Aral, Dzhambay, Dzhizak, Zaamin, Ishtyhan, Kara-Darya, Kara-Kishlak, Katta-Kurgan, Komsomolsk, Kushrabad, Mitan, Narpay, Nuratinsk, Pai-Aryk, Past-Dargom, Pakhtakor, Samarkand, Urgut, Farish, Khatyrchi, Samarkand city, Jizzakh city, Katta-Kurgan city |
| Surkhan-Darya | Baysun, Denau, Dzhar-Kurgan, Sary-Assiya, Termez, Uzun, Shirabad, Shurchi, Termez city |
| Tashkent | Ak-Kurgan, Ahan-Garan, Begovat, Bukin, Upper Chirchik, Kalinin, Karasu, Mirzachul, Lower Chirchik, Ordzhonikidze, Parkent, Pskent, Middle Chirchik, Syr-Darya, Tashkent, Hawast, Chainz, Yangi-Yul, Tashkent city, Angren city, Begovat city, Chirchik city, Yangi-Yul city |
| Ferghana | Alti-Aryk, Akhunbabaev, Baghdad, Buvayd, Vuadil, Gors, Kaganovich, Kirov, Kokand, Kuvasay, Kuvin, Kuibyshev, Molotov, Sokh, Tashlak, Fergana, Frunzen, Fergana city, Kokhand city, Margelan city |
| Khorezm | Gurlensky, Kosh-Kupyr, Mangit, Urgench, Khazarasp, Hankin, Khiva, Shavat, Yangi-Aryk, Urgench, Khiva |
| Kara-Kalpak Autonomous Soviet Socialist Republic | Kara-Uzyak, Kegeylin, Kipchak, Kuibyshev, Kungrad, Muynak, Takhta-Kupyr, Turtkul, Khojeyli, Chimbay, Shabbaz, Turtkul city, Nukus city, Khojeyli city, Chimbay city |

By a decree of the Presidium of the USSR Armed Forces dated February 13, 1956, part of the lands of the Hungry Desert and the Bostandyk (now Bostanlyk) district were taken from the Kazakh SSR and given to the Uzbek SSR. In 1963, a decree of the Presidium of the Supreme Soviet of the USSR also ruled that 36.6 thousand sq. km of underutilized lands of Chimkent and Kzyl-Orda belonging to Kazakh SSR be allocated to Uzbekistan.

On January 25, 1960, the Kashkadarya and Namangan Oblasts were abolished. The former became mostly part of the Surkhan-Darya Oblast, while the latter was distributed between Andijan and Ferghana Oblasts. Shortly thereafter, on February 16, 1963, a new Syrdarya Oblast was established from the parts of the newly acquired agricultural lands of Samarkand and Tashkent regions (the center originally set in Yangiyer, however starting from November 1963 in Gulistan).

On February 7, 1964 the Kashkadarya Oblast was restored followed by the Namangan Oblast on December 18, 1967.

On June 28, 1971 the Dzhetysay, Kirov and Pakhtaaral rayons of the Syrdarya Oblast of the Uzbek SSR that had very small areas were transferred from to the Chimkent Oblast of the Kazakh SSR.

On December 29, 1973 the Jizzakh Oblast was established from the part of the Syrdarya Oblast. Navoi was the last oblast to be established from the parts of the Bukhara and Samarkand oblasts on April 20, 1982. Consequently, as of January 1, 1987, the administrative-territorial division of the Uzbek SSR was as follows:

| Oblasts | Rayons and cities of regional subordination |
|---|---|
| Karakalpak ASSR | Amudarya, Beruni, Bozatau, Karauzyak, Kegeyli, Kungrad, Leninabad, Muynak, Nukus, Takhtakupyr, Turtkul, Khojeyli, Chimbay, Shumanai, Ellikkalin, Turtkul city, Nukus city, Beruni city, Takhiatash city, Khojeyli city, Chimbay city |
| Andijan | Altynkul, Andijan, Balykchi, Boz, Jalalkuduk, Izbaskan, Komsomolabad, Lenin, Markhamat, Moscow, Pakhtaabad, Khojaabad, Andizhan city, Lenin city, Sovetabad city, Shakhrikhan city |
| Bukhara | Alat, Bukhara, Wabkent, Gijduvan, Kagan, Karakul, Peshkun, Romitan, Sverdlovsk, Shafrikan, Bukhara city, Gijduvan city, Kagan city |
| Jizzakh | Arnasay, Bakhmal, Gallyaral, Jizzakh, Dustlik, Zaamin, Zarbdar, Mirzachul, October, Pakhtakor, Farish, Jizzakh city |
| Kashkadarya | Bakhoristan, Guzar, Dekhkanabad, Kamashin, Karshi, Kasan, Kitab, Mubarek, Nishan, Ulyanov, Usman-Yusupov, Chirakchi, Shakhrisabz, Yakkabag, Karshi city, Kasan city, Kitab city, Mubarek city, Shkhrisabz city |
| Navoi | Kanimekh, Kyzyltepa, Navbahor, Navoi, Nuratin, Tamdyn, Uchkuduk, Khatyrchi, Navoi city, Zarafshan city, Uchkuduk city |
| Namangan | Zadarya, Kasansay, Namangan, Naryn, Papal, Turakurgan, Uychi, Uchkurgan, Chartak, Chust, Yangikurgan, Namangan city, Kasansay city, Uchkurgan city, Chartak city, Chust city |
| Samarkand | Akdarya, Bolshevik, Bulungur, Dzhambay, Ishtyhan, Kattakurgan, Koshrabad, Narpay, Payaryk, Pastdargom, Pakhtachi, Samarkand, Sovetabad, Urgut, Samarkand city, Aktash city, Kattakurgan city, Urgut city |
| Surkhandarya | Altynsay, Angor, Baysun, Gagarin, Denau, Dzharkurgan, Kumkurgan, Leninul, Sariassiyo, Termez, Sherabad, Shurchi, Termez city, Denau city |
| Syrdarya | Akaltyn, Bayaut, Voroshilov, Gulistan, Ilyichev, Komsomol, Mehnatabad, Syrdarya, Havast, Gulistan city, Syrdarya city, Shirin city, Yangiyer city |
| Tashkent | Akkurgan, Akhangaran, Bekabad, Bostanlyk, Bukin, Galabin, Kalinin, Kommunist, Ordzhonikidze, Parkent, Pskent, Mid-Chirchik, Tashkent, Chinaz, Yangiyul, Almalyk city, Angren city, Akhangaran city, Bekabad city, Narimanov city, Chirchik city, Yangiabad city, Yangiyul city |
| Ferghana | Altyaryk, Akhunbabaev, Baghdad, Buvaidi, Kirov, Kuvin, Leningrad, Rishtan, Tashlak, Uzbekistan, Ferghana, Frunze, Yazyavan, Fergana city, Kokand city, Kuva city, Kuvasay city, Margilan city |
| Khorezm | Bagat, Gurlen, Koshkupyr, Urgench, Khazarasp, Hankin, Khiva, Shavat, Yangiarik, Yangibazar, Urgench city, Gurlen city, Druzhba city, Khanka city, Khiva city, Shavat city |
| Tashkent city | Akmal-Irkamov, Kirov, Kuibyshev, Lenin, October, Sabir-Rakhimov, Sergeli, Frunze, Khamza0, Chilanzar |

=== Post 1987 ===
On September 6, 1988, the Jizzakh and Navoi oblasts were abolished. At the same time, the former was merged into the Syrdarya oblast, whereas the latter joined Samarkand. In May 1989, most of the former Navoi Oblast was transferred to the Bukhara Oblast. However, the Jizzakh Oblast was restored in February 1990 followed by the Navoi oblast in 1992.

After the Uzbek SSR became independent and turned into the Republic of Uzbekistan, the Karakalpak Autonomous Soviet Socialist Republic was renamed to the Republic of Karakalpakstan. Furthermore, oblasts were renamed into viloyats (English: regions), while rayons became tumans (English: district). In the early 1990s, a number of regions and cities of Uzbekistan that bore Soviet ideological names were renamed. The last (as of 2012) major change in the administrative-territorial division of Uzbekistan was the transfer of the Yangiabad District from the Syrdarya region to Jizzakh in 1999.
