= Kyrgyzstan–Uzbekistan relations =

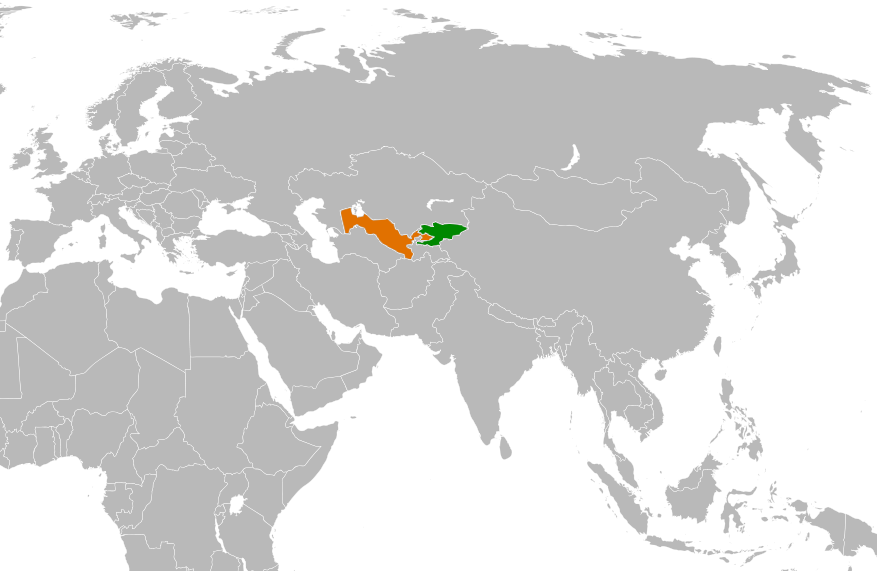

- Kyrgyzstan: Uzbekistan

Kyrgyzstan–Uzbekistan relations refers to the bilateral relations between the Republic of Uzbekistan and the Kyrgyz Republic. Uzbekistan dominates southern Kyrgyzstan both economically and politically, based on the large Uzbek population in that region of Kyrgyzstan and on economic and geographic conditions. Much of Kyrgyzstan depends entirely on Uzbekistan for natural gas; on several occasions, the former president of Uzbekistan Islam Karimov achieved political ends by shutting pipelines or by adjusting terms of delivery.

In a number of television appearances broadcast in the Osh and Jalal-Abad provinces of Kyrgyzstan, Karimov has addressed Akayev with considerable condescension; Akayev, in turn, has been highly deferential to his much stronger neighbor. Although Uzbekistan has not shown overt expansionist tendencies, the Kyrgyz government is acutely aware of the implications of Karimov's assertions that he is responsible for the well-being of all Uzbeks, regardless of their nation of residence.

== Political relations ==
Kyrgyz–Uzbek political relations were further consolidated through the signing of the Treaty on the Junction Point of State Borders and the Khujand Declaration on Eternal Friendship on 31 March 2025. These agreements, reached at a trilateral summit with Tajikistan, emphasized mutual recognition of borders and commitments to peaceful cooperation. The symbolic inauguration of a stele at the tri-border point underscored a shared vision of stability and regional integration, reinforcing Kyrgyz–Uzbek efforts to resolve past border issues and enhance diplomatic engagement.

== Cultural relations ==
On 24 February 2025, the Central Asian Football Association announced a historic bid between Kyrgyzstan, Tajikistan, and Uzbekistan to bring the Asian Cup to Central Asia for the first time.

== Transport ==
In March 2018, Uzbekistan Railways began a new service, connecting Tashkent with Balykchy.

Centrum Air and Uzbekistan Airways operate services between the two countries.

== State Visits ==
=== Presidential visits from Uzbekistan to Kyrgyzstan ===
- Islam Karimov - (January 16, 1994)
- Islam Karimov - (September 26–27, 2000)
- Islam Karimov - (2007)
- Islam Karimov - (2013)
- Shavkat Mirziyoyev - (2017)

=== Presidential visits from Kyrgyzstan to Uzbekistan ===
- Askar Akayev - (1992)
- Askar Akayev - (1996)
- Askar Akayev - (1998)
- Kurmanbek Bakiyev - (2006)
- Almazbek Atambayev - (2017)
- Sooronbay Jeenbekov - (2017)

== See also ==
- Foreign relations of Kyrgyzstan
- Foreign relations of Uzbekistan
- 2010 South Kyrgyzstan ethnic clashes
- Osh riots (1990)
