= 2023 Uzbek constitutional referendum =

- 30 April 2023
- Do you accept the Constitutional Law of the Republic of Uzbekistan on the Constitution of the Republic of Uzbekistan?

Results
Choice	Votes	%
Yes	15,034,608	90.61%
No	1,558,817	9.39%
Valid votes	16,593,425	99.56%
Invalid or blank votes	73,672	0.44%
Total votes	16,667,097	100.00%
Registered voters/turnout	19,722,809	84.51%

A constitutional referendum was held in Uzbekistan on 30 April 2023. It was to be held on proposed constitutional amendments.

Parliament approved the referendum on 15 March 2023. The amendments were accepted in the referendum with over 90% in support.

== Background ==
President Shavkat Mirziyoyev was re-elected in 2021 for a second term in elections which were noted for a lack of competition. However, he is ineligible to run for the office in 2026, in accordance with the current constitution, since it limits presidents to two terms of five years each.

The Constitutional Court ruled that if the proposed constitutional amendments are approved by the voters, incumbent president Mirziyoyev would be able to seek a third term. Observers have criticised the referendum for including provisions that may allow Mirziyoyev to claim a third or even a fourth term in the future, with many being concerned about the path of the country's reforms and if the "Uzbek thaw" under Mirziyoyev will continue. It is also the seventh time that the Uzbek constitution has been altered significantly since 1992, following earlier attempts to zero out previous terms and evade term limits. The state, symbolically, tries to frame the Uzbekistani people as the main author of this constitutional proposal.

== Question ==
Voters were asked whether they approved of a proposed constitutional act that would revise the current constitution. The official text of the referendum reads:

Siz O‘zbekiston Respublikasi Konstitutsiyasi to‘g‘risidagi O‘zbekiston Respublikasi Konstitutsiyaviy Qonunini qabul qilasizmi?
English: Do you accept the Constitutional Law of the Republic of Uzbekistan on the Constitution of the Republic of Uzbekistan?

== Proposed amendments ==
Some of the suggested changes in the referendum, among others, are:

- extending the presidential term from 5 to 7 years
- adding that Uzbekistan is a "legal, social, and secular" state (in addition to the current "sovereign" and "democratic")
- introducing language discouraging the state from harming the rights and freedoms of people and citizens (including in foreign policy)
- adding rights/protections for the accused in crimes they have not yet been convicted of, as well as prohibiting extradition, capital punishment (constitutionally, as previously it was prohibited by presidential decree) and cruel and unusual punishment, and adding the defense of double jeopardy
- making all laws exempting or mitigating punishment for an offense retroactive
- guaranteeing the right to confidentiality of communications and the right to freedom of communication absent of a court order
- guaranteeing the right to protection of personal data; adding that "everyone has the right to get acquainted with the information collected about them in state bodies, self-government bodies of citizens, public associations, organizations and to correct incorrect information, as well as illegally has the right to request the destruction of data that has been collected or does not have a legal basis"
- adding labor protections such as fair remuneration and a living minimum wage, prohibiting wage discrimination or termination against women due to pregnancy or having children, and the right to paid parental leave
- adding that the state shall provide housing for the socially needy and low-income citizens who require improvement in housing conditions (subject to law), guaranteeing promotion of the rights of the disabled, and prohibiting discrimination against the disabled
- citizens are guaranteed (subject to law) a minimum amount of medical care free of charge at the point of service, including urgent and emergency care
- codifying a commitment to protecting the environment and sustainable development
- changing "Everyone has the right to education. Free general education is guaranteed by the state. School affairs are under state control" to "Everyone has the right to education. The state supports the development of preschool education and upbringing. The state guarantees the right of every child to undergo compulsory one-year training for admission to general secondary education institutions. Free general secondary education is guaranteed by the state. General secondary education is compulsory. School work, pre-school education and upbringing will be under state control. Inclusive education and upbringing are organized in educational organizations for children with special educational needs and individual capabilities. The state shall guarantee that talented young people continue their education regardless of their financial situation. The state shall create equal conditions for the development of state-owned, private and other educational institutions and organizations. Strengthening the status of teaching staff in all aspects is the goal and responsible task of the society and the state. It is not allowed to interfere with the professional activities of teaching staff, as well as to prevent them from fulfilling their service obligations."
- adding that "Everyone has the right to get free higher education in public educational institutions on a competitive basis. Higher education and scientific-research organizations have the right to self-management, academic freedom, as well as freedom of research and teaching within the framework established by law. The state supports the development of science and the establishment of scientific relations with the world scientific community."
- adding that "Everyone has the right to protect their rights and freedoms in all ways not prohibited by law."
- adding that "Unfair competition and monopolization are not allowed in economic activity. The results of expropriation and privatization cannot be reviewed and canceled."
- introduction of compulsory acquisition in special cases (as stipulated by law), on the condition of advance and fair compensation to the owner
- adding that marriage "shall be based on the traditional family values of the people of Uzbekistan"
- adding that a person that is a member of the Oliy Majlis cannot be a member of the Supreme Council of Karakalpakstan at the same time
- extending the deadline for sending laws passed by the Oliy Majlis to the Senate (from the date of adoption of the law) from the current 10 days to 20 days; extending the deadline for sending the laws approved by the Senate to the president for signing and promulgation (from the date of approval of the law) from 10 days to 20 days; extending the time limit for the President to sign and promulgate the legislation passed by the Senate from the current 20 days to 2 months
- separating representative and executive power in regional government (previously both would be held by the regional Hokim)
- clarifying that the Constitutional Court can "consider the complaints of citizens and legal entities regarding the verification of the constitutionality of the law applied to them by the court in a specific case"

== Results ==
Choice	Votes	%
For	15,034,608	90.61
Against	1,558,817	9.39
Total	16,593,425	100.00
Valid votes	16,593,425	99.56
Invalid/blank votes	73,672	0.44
Total votes	16,667,097	100.00
Registered voters/turnout	19,722,809	84.51
Source: Gazeta
