= Supreme Council of Karakalpakstan =

Parliament of the Republic of Karakalpakstan

Coordinates: 41°18′52″N 69°15′55″E

Supreme Council of the Republic of Karakalpakstan: Qoraqalpogʻiston Respublikasi Joʻqorgʻi Kengesi (Uzbek); Qaraqalpaqstan Respublikası Joqarǵı Keńesi (Karakalpak); Верховный Совет Республики Каракалпакстан (Russian)
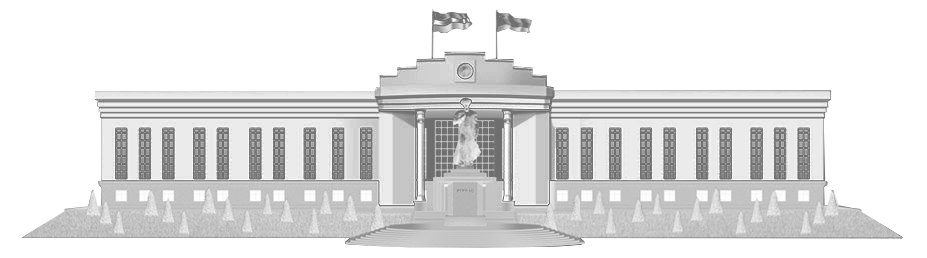

Type
- Type: Parliament of the Republic of Karakalpakstan
- Term limits: None

History
- Founded: 1994
- Preceded by: Supreme Soviet of the Karakalpak ASSR

Leadership
- Chairman: Amanbai Orynbaev since 26 August 2022

Structure
- Seats: 65 (elected for 5-year terms in single-seat constituencies using)
- Political groups: Government coalition (33); Liberal Democratic Party (19); National Revival Democratic Party (14); Opposition (32); People's Democratic Party (16); Ecological Party (10); Justice Social Democratic Party (6)
- Length of term: 5 years

Elections
- First election: 25 December 1994
- Last election: 22 December 2019

Meeting place
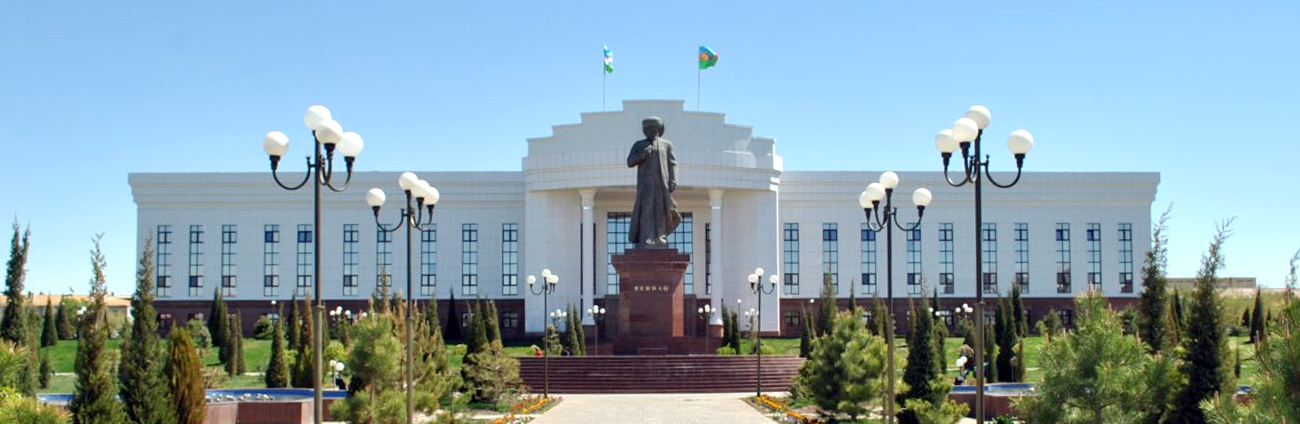
- Supreme Council Building in Nukus

Website
- parliamentrk.gov.uz/ru

The Supreme Council (Karakalpak: Joqarǵı Keńes, Жоқарғы Кeңeс, Uzbek: Joʻqorgʻi Kenges, Жўқорғи Кенгес) is the parliament of the Republic of Karakalpakstan. It succeeded the Supreme Soviet of the Karakalpak ASSR in 1994, and is a unicameral parliament.

The Supreme Council of the Republic of Karakalpakstan is the highest state representative body of Karakalpakstan and exercises legislative power. The Supreme Council has sixty-five deputies who elected by secret ballot in single-member constituencies on a multiparty basis and on the basis of equal and direct suffrage. The stability and effectiveness of the work of the Supreme Council shall be ensured by the work of the sessions of the Supreme Council, the Presidium, committees, commissions and deputies.

The order of work of the Supreme Council is determined by the Constitution of the Republic of Karakalpakstan, the Charter of the Republic of Karakalpakstan "On the Supreme Council of the Republic of Karakalpakstan" and other regulations. The procedure for holding elections to the Supreme Council is determined by the Regulations of the Republic of Karakalpakstan "On Elections" and other statutory documents.

The term of office of the Supreme Council is five years. After the expiration of the term of office, the Supreme Council of the Republic of Karakalpakstan shall continue its work until the beginning of the work of the newly-voted Supreme Council of the Republic of Karakalpakstan.

== History ==
On September 24, 1994, in accordance with the agenda of the seventeenth session of the Supreme Soviet of the Republic of Karakalpakstan, the Constitutional Charter of the Republic of Karakalpakstan "On the Supreme Council of the Republic of Karakalpakstan" was adopted.

On October 31, 1994, the Resolution of the Supreme Soviet of the Republic of Karakalpakstan "On Enactment of the Rules of Procedure of the Supreme Council of the Republic of Karakalpakstan" was adopted. The Rules of Procedure of the Supreme Council of the Republic of Karakalpakstan consisted of 5 chapters, 10 sections and 117 articles.

On December 25, 1994, another historic event took place in Uzbekistan, took place the first call to the Oliy Majlis of the Republic of Uzbekistan; for the first time in the history of the Supreme Soviet of the Republic of Karakalpakstan, democratic, multi-party elections were held.

172 students from the People's Democratic Party of Uzbekistan and government organizations competed for 86 seats in the Supreme Council of the Republic of Karakalpakstan. Voters were given the right to choose their representatives. In the first round, deputies were elected in 75 constituencies, but an additional round of re-elections was held on 22 January 1995 due to the inability of any of the students nominated in 11 constituencies to get a sufficient number of votes. Thus, the corps of deputies of the Supreme Council of the Republic of Karakalpakstan, the highest state body for the exercise of legislative power, was formed.

Of the 669,904 eligible voters, 628,407 exercised their constitutional right, which is 96 percent of the total number of eligible voters.

== See also ==
- Administrative divisions of Uzbekistan
- Karakalpak Autonomous Soviet Socialist Republic
- Constitution of Karakalpakstan
