= Shavkat Mirziyoyev =

President of Uzbekistan since 2016

- Шавкат Мирзиёев
- Mirziyoyev in 2025

2nd President of Uzbekistan
- Incumbent
- Assumed office 14 December 2016 (Note: Acting: 8 September – 14 December 2016)
- Prime Minister: Himself; Abdulla Aripov
- Preceded by: Islam Karimov; Nigmatilla Yuldashev (acting)

3rd Prime Minister of Uzbekistan
- In office 12 December 2003 – 14 December 2016
- President: Islam Karimov; Nigmatilla Yuldashev (acting); Himself (acting)
- Deputy: Abdulla Aripov; Ergash Shoismatov
- Preceded by: Oʻtkir Sultonov
- Succeeded by: Abdulla Aripov

Chairman of the Organization of Turkic States
- In office 11 November 2022 – 7 October 2025
- Preceded by: Islam Karimov
- Succeeded by: Ilham Aliyev

Personal details
- Born: Shavkat Miromonovich Mirziyoyev; 24 July 1957 (age 69) Zomin, Uzbek SSR, Soviet Union
- Party: UzLiDeP (2016–present)
- Other political affiliations: CPU (until 1991); FMDP (1991–2008); OʻzMTDP (2008–2016)
- Spouse: Ziroat Hoshimova
- Children: 3, including Saida
- Education: Tashkent Institute of Irrigation and Melioration
- Website: https://president.uz/en

Shavkat Miromonovich Mirziyoyev (Note: Uzbek: Shavkat Miromonovich (Miromon oʻgʻli) Mirziyoyev, Шавкат Миромонович (Миромон ўғли) Мирзиёев pronounced [ʃɑfˈkɑt mirɔˈmɔnəvʲit͡ɕ (mirɔˈmɔn œɣˈlə) mirziˈjɔjɪf] Russian: Шавкат Миромонович Мирзиёев) (born 24 July 1957) is an Uzbek politician who has served as the second president of Uzbekistan since 2016. A member of the Uzbekistan Liberal Democratic Party, he served as the third prime minister under President Islam Karimov from 2003 to 2016. Mirziyoyev has also served as chairman of the Organization of Turkic States since 2022.

Mirziyoyev joined the Communist Party of the Soviet Union in the late 1980s. He was elected as a deputy of the Supreme Soviet of the Uzbek SSR in 1990. From mid-1990s, he headed several regions of Jizzakh and Samarqand as a governor (hakim) before his appointment as prime minister by then-President Karimov.

Following the death of President Karimov, Mirziyoyev was appointed by the Oliy Majlis as acting president of Uzbekistan on 8 September 2016. He was subsequently elected to a full five-year term as president in the 2016 election from the Uzbekistan Liberal Democratic Party (OʻzLiDeP), winning 88.6% of the vote. Mirziyoyev was re-elected for second five-year term with 80.3% of the vote in the 2021 presidential election, and then again for a renewed first seven-year term with 87.7% of the vote in a snap 2023 presidential election as an independent candidate with the OʻzLiDeP backing, after a constitutional amendment had granted him to legally run for third time after resetting his presidential term of office.

Under his presidency, Mirziyoyev implemented a range of liberal reforms in Uzbekistan’s political system, economy by creating a favorable business-climate, attracting foreign investment and re-integrating the country into the WTO, consolidation and unity of Central Asian region through resolution of pressing issues by attracting foreign investment, development of an open foreign policy and multifaceted cooperation with the Western, European, Eastern, and Middle Eastern countries, as well as release of political prisoners that was notably accompanied by closure of the infamous Jaslyk Prison in 2019. In late 2021, he announced a series of constitutional reforms which included the protection of human rights, which were ratified following the 2023 constitutional referendum with an overwhelming 90.6% of support.

== Early life and career ==
Mirziyoyev was born on 24 July 1957 in the Jizzakh Region of the Uzbek SSR. Some media outlets alleged that he was actually born in the village of Yakhtan in the Leninabad Oblast (now the Sughd Region) of Tajikistan, and even unconfirmed claims that he was allegedly a Tajik. After an investigation by several journalists, it was revealed that Yakhtan is the native home of Mirziyoyev's grandfather on his father's side, but that his family is ethnically Uzbek. His father, Miromon Mirziyoyevich Mirziyoyev, worked as a physician for most of his life until death. He worked as the head physician of the tuberculosis dispensary in Zaamin. O‘rinbek Yoqubov, a cousin of Miromon, being a veteran of World War II, became a Hero of the Soviet Union in April 1944. Shavkat's mother Marifat, died at a young age from tuberculosis, which she contracted in the Zaamin tuberculosis dispensary, where she worked as a nurse. After the death of his wife, Miromon Mirziyoyev married a second time to a woman from Tatarstan.

In 1981, Mirziyoyev graduated from the Tashkent Institute of Irrigation and Melioration. He holds a Candidate (Ph.D.) degree in Technological Sciences. He joined the Communist Party of the Soviet Union in the late 1980s. In early 1990, he was elected as a deputy of the Supreme Soviet of the Uzbek SSR's last legislative body before the independence of Uzbekistan in 1991. The ceremony took place in the Senate and State Legislative Assembly Building in Tashkent.

== Political career ==
In 1990, Mirziyoyev was appointed a deputy of the Supreme council of the republic, where he served as a chairman of the Mandate commission.

In 1992, he was appointed a governor (Hakim) of Mirzo Ulugbek District of Tashkent. In 1996-2001 worked as a hokim of Jizzakh Region, and 2001-2003 hokim of Samarqand Region, contributing to their social-economic development. He was nominated as prime minister by President Islam Karimov on 12 December 2003, and approved by the Uzbek parliament. He replaced Prime Minister Oʻtkir Sultonov.

Mirziyoyev was appointed as the Prime Minister of the Republic of Uzbekistan in 2003 and subsequently re-approved three times (in 2005, 2010, and 2015) in his post by both Chambers of the Oliy Majlis.

In his activities, Shavkat Mirziyoyev attached special significance to economic development on an industrial basis, improving the country's exporting potential, fundamentally transforming the agricultural sector, especially through the extensive advancement of farming enterprises, deep processing of agricultural products, providing food security for the nation, and guaranteeing the supply of goods to the population at reasonable prices.

On September 8, 2016, following the death of Islam Karimov, based on a joint resolution of the Legislative Chamber (Lower House) and Senate of the Oliy Majlis of Uzbekistan adopted at a joint session, Mirziyoyev was temporarily assigned the duties and powers of the President of the Republic of Uzbekistan.

In recognition of the many years of work in government, contribution to the country’s development, and improvement of the people’s welfare, Shavkat Mirziyoyev was awarded the Order “Mehnat shuhrati” (‘Glory of Labor’) and “Fidokorona xizmatlari uchun” (‘For Selfless Service’).

On October 19, 2016, the Movement of Entrepreneurs and Businessmen - Liberal Democratic Party of Uzbekistan (UzLiDeP) nominated Mirziyoyev as the candidate for the presidential elections.

Shavkat Mirziyoyev was elected President of the Republic of Uzbekistan with 88.61 percent of the vote based on the results of the presidential elections that took place on December 4, 2016, officially assuming the post on December 14, 2016.

On October 24, 2021 Shavkat Mirziyoyev has been re-elected for a second five-year term, winning 80.1% of the vote. Following the constitutional reform, Mirziyoyev won an early presidential election on July 9, 2023 with 87.05% of the vote.

== Presidency ==
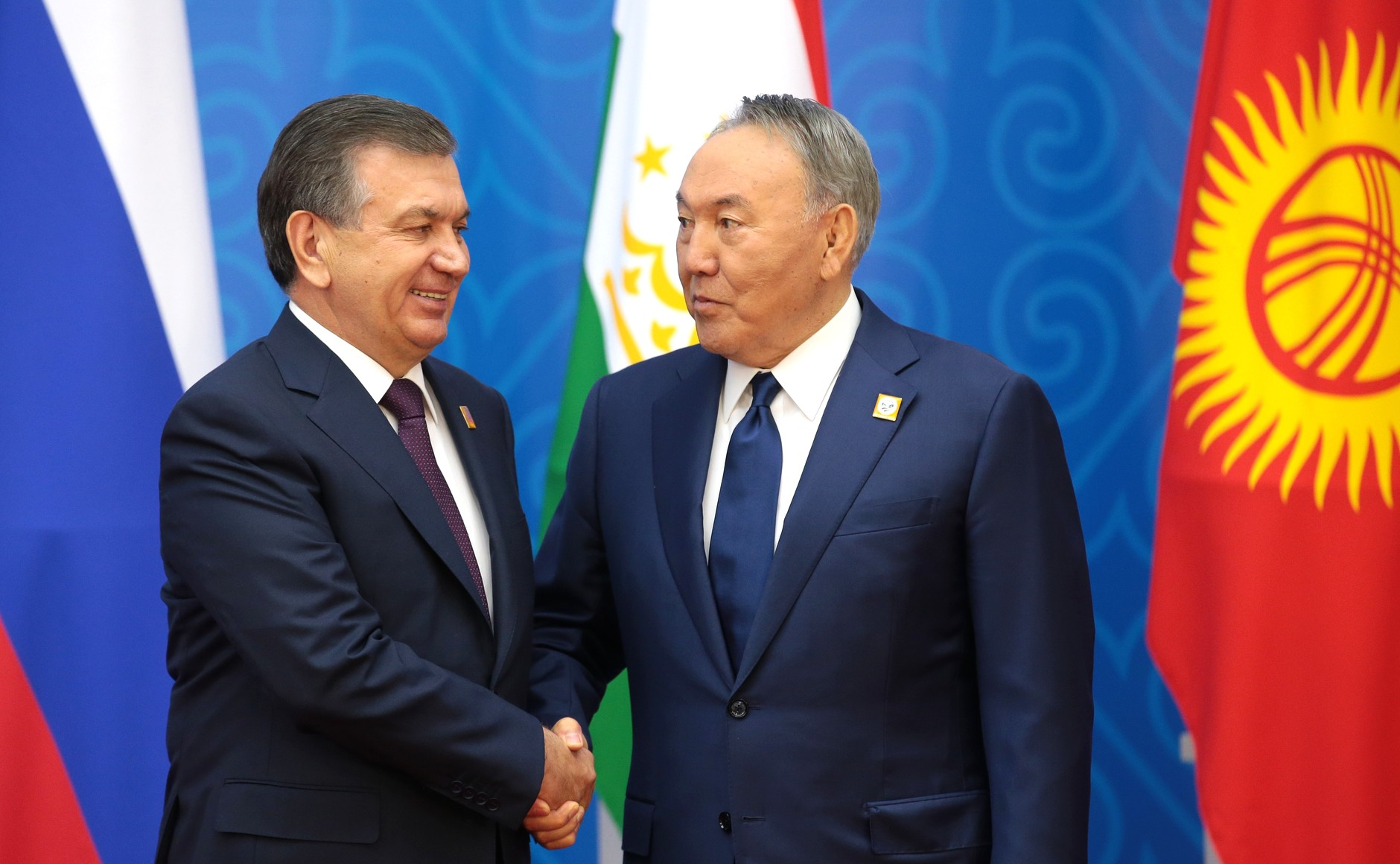
Mirziyoyev shakes hands with Nursultan Nazarbayev at the 2017 SCO summit in Kazakhstan

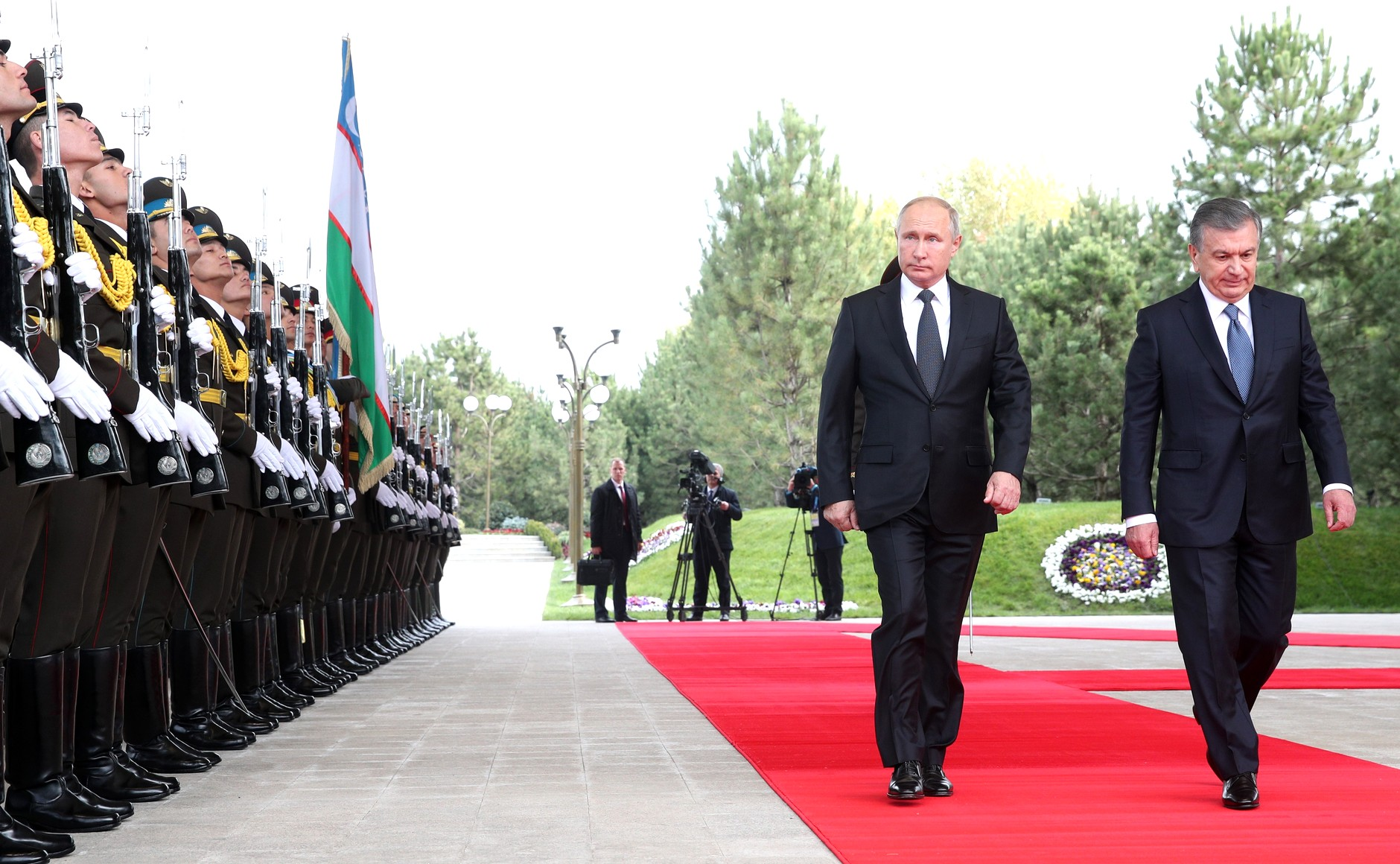
Mirziyoyev with Vladimir Putin in October 2018

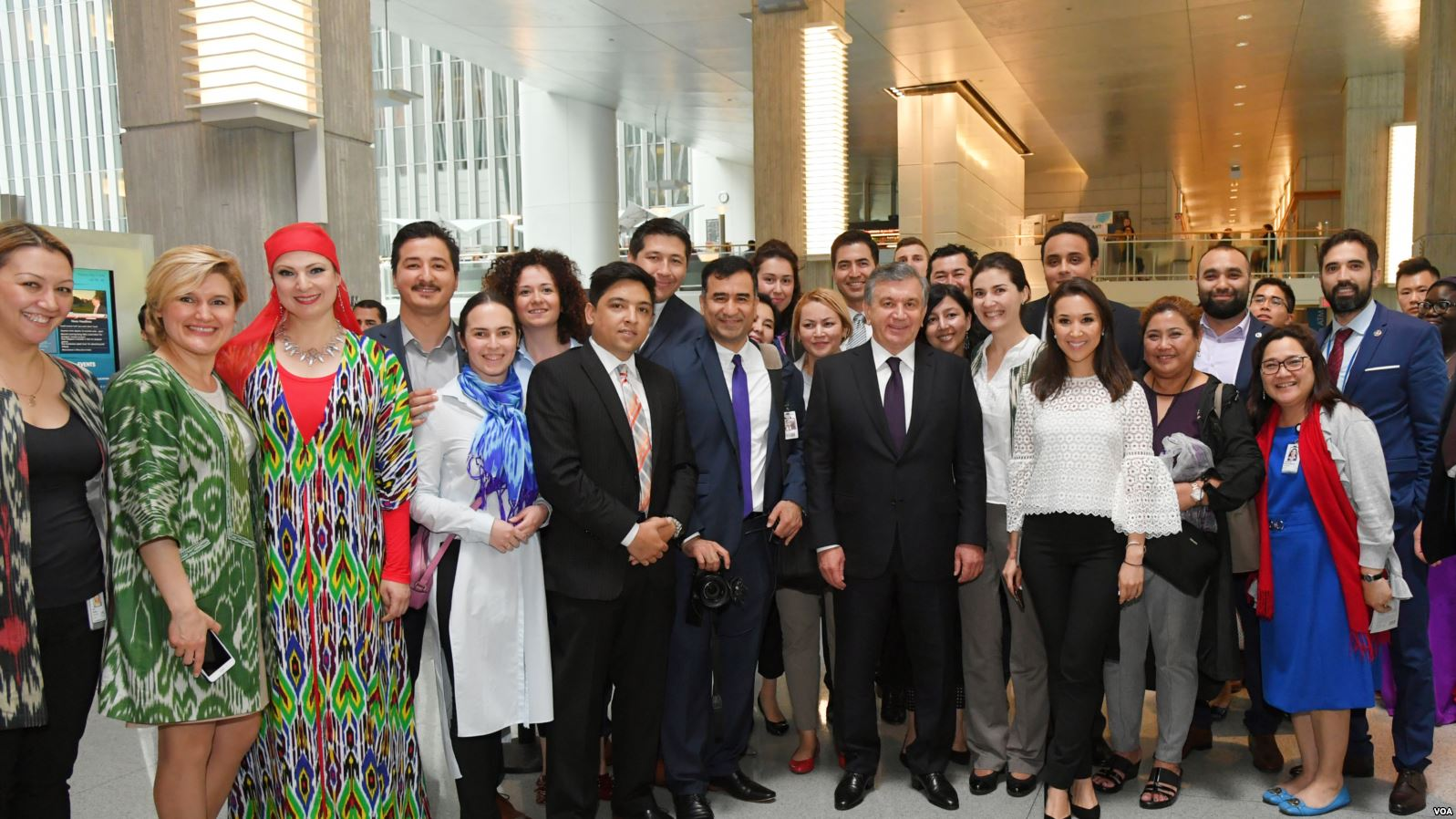
Mirziyoyev with members of the Uzbek American diaspora in New York City in May 2018

A member of the Samarkand clan, he was considered to be one of the leading potential successors to Islam Karimov as President of Uzbekistan. Mirziyoyev was reported to have friendly relations with Karimov's wife, Tatyana Karimova, and National Security Council chairman Rustam Inoyatov.

After the death of Karimov was announced on 2 September 2016, Mirziyoyev was appointed as head of the committee organizing the funeral of the President. That was taken as a sign that Mirziyoyev would succeed Karimov as president. On 8 September 2016, he was appointed as interim president of Uzbekistan by a joint session of both houses of parliament. Although the chairman of the Senate, Nigmatilla Yuldashev, was constitutionally designated as Karimov's successor, Yuldashev proposed that Mirziyoyev take the post of interim president instead in light of Mirziyoyev's "many years of experience". There were expectations that Mirziyoyev would repair Uzbek relations with Kyrgyzstan and Tajikistan. He started to settle a long-running border dispute with Kyrgyzstan, and regular flights between the capitals of Uzbekistan and Tajikistan were set to resume in January 2017 for the first time since 1992. The electoral commission announced on 16 September that Mirziyoyev would stand in the December 2016 presidential election as the candidate of the Liberal Democratic Party.

Mirziyoyev had won the election held on 4 December 2016 with 88.6% of the vote according to official results, defeating three minor candidates. The election was described by The Economist as a sham; the paper wrote that Mirziyoyev's bent was as authoritarian as that of Karimov and that state media claimed the choice was between Mirziyoyev, chaos, or Islamic radicalism. It also claimed that the three opponents were only on the ballot to keep up the appearance of pluralism. The Organization for Security and Co-operation in Europe said the election lacked "a genuine choice," pointing to instances of ballot box stuffing and proxy voting.

On 12 December 2016, Deputy Prime Minister Abdulla Aripov was nominated to take over from Mirziyoyev as prime minister. Mirziyoyev was sworn in as president on 14 December, vowing to "continue the work of my dear teacher, the great statesman Islam Karimov", while also promising "many changes in the cabinet". Aripov was confirmed as prime minister by parliament on the same day; a cabinet reshuffle followed on 15 December. On 6 March 2017, he made a state visit to Turkmenistan; it was his first foreign trip after the election.

=== Domestic reforms ===
In the three months following the death of Islam Karimov, Mirziyoyev began to hint at reforms to longstanding policies that had held back the Uzbek economy and isolated the country internationally. Consequently, many analysts believed that Mirziyoyev would be a better president than his predecessor.

However, the German Federal Ministry for Economic Cooperation and Development noted that "the people of Uzbekistan play no part in political decision‑making processes. So far, no parliamentary or presidential election held in the post‑Soviet era has been considered as either free or fair by the international community ... Given the sensitive political situation in Uzbekistan, development cooperation activities there are implemented as far away from government circles as possible." Nevertheless, some positive results of his rule are visible. Uzbekistan created more than 336,000 new jobs in 2017. The volume of exports increased by almost 15 per cent. In 2018, total exports were expected to reach $12.1 billion. He initiated the 'Tashkent City' project, intended to attract foreign investors to Uzbekistan. Mirziyoyev promised to resume negotiations with the World Trade Organization (WTO) on joining the organisation in 2018. On several occasions, he sharply criticised the administration and officials in the presence of the media.

On 22 December, for the first time in the country's history, Shavkat Mirziyoyev made an address to parliament. His speech lasted four hours. He said:

Some people tell me that I did not know about everything in my country when I was prime minister. I knew everything, but the environment was bad. Now I am talking about it openly, even if some people do not like it. For several years, the so‑called 'rats', 'the children of some people', did much to spoil the country's investment fund. Corruption is implicated in many investment projects, and in some projects it is as high as 50%. Corruption was also present in transport policy, both internal and external.

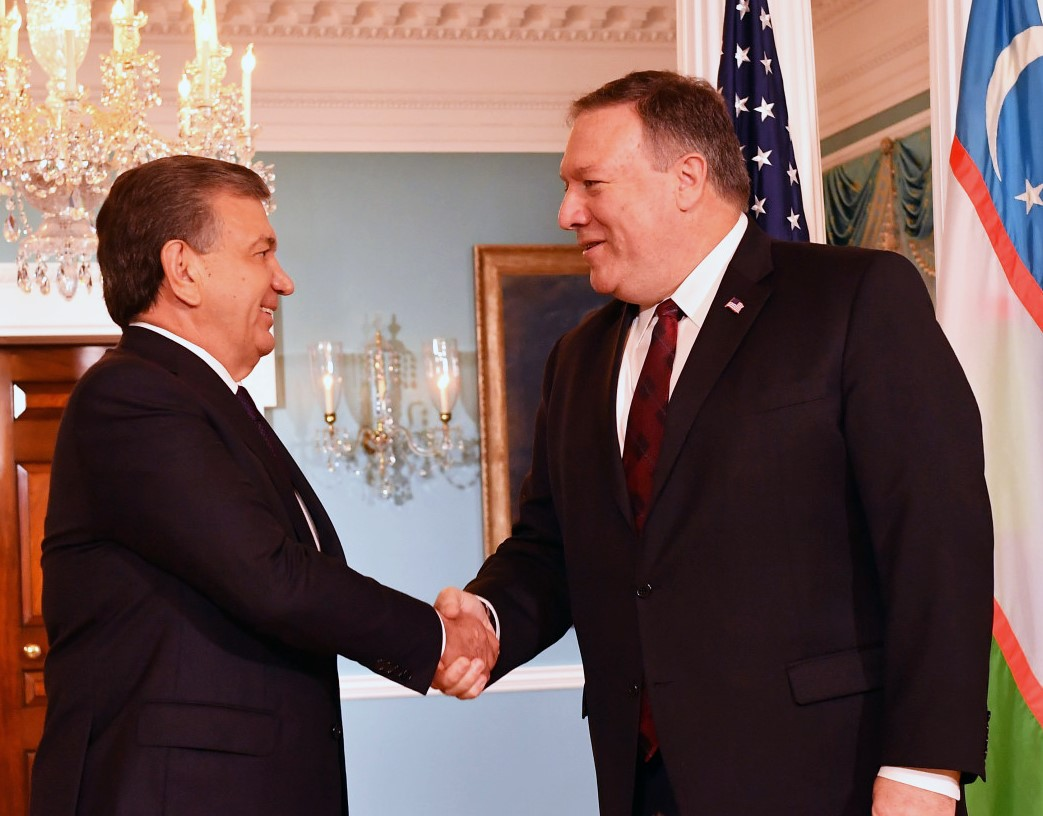
U.S. Secretary of State Mike Pompeo meets with the President of Uzbekistan Shavkat Mirziyoyev, at the Department of State in Washington, D.C., on 17 May 2018.

Some analysts think Mirziyoyev wants to enter in history as a reformer. He removed most of Karimov's officials and urged government to employ "new, young people who love their country." After a year in office, Mirziyoyev is increasingly moving away from his predecessor's policy, which is especially visible in his active foreign policy. He visited all the Uzbek regions and big cities to get acquainted with the implementation of the projects and reforms which he had ordered. Many analysts and Western media compared his rule with Chinese leader Deng Xiaoping or Russian leader Mikhail Gorbachev; his rule has been quoted as being an "Uzbek Spring".

At the end of that year, he was named the "Asian of the Year of 2018" by the Asia Journalist Association (AJA).

In August 2019 he closed the notorious Jaslyk Prison.

In July 2021, Mirziyoyev's spokesperson attempted to generate some suspense as to whether or not the President would run in the elections again. It was widely acknowledged that Mirziyoyev would not only participate but likely win.

==== Constitutional reform ====
On 1 July 2022 protests broke out in the autonomous region of Karakalpakstan over proposed amendments to the Constitution of Uzbekistan which would have ended Karakalpakstan's status as an autonomous region of Uzbekistan and right to secede from Uzbekistan via referendum. They were brutally suppressed, at least 18 people were killed. President Mirziyoyev traveled to Nukus on July 2 in the midst of the crisis. He announced that the controversial constitutional changes affecting Karakalpakstan would be withdrawn.

The updated Constitution defines Uzbekistan the first time as a social, secular and legal state. Main changes include a shift from the principle of state-society-individual to individual-society-state. The norms relating to the state’s social obligations have been tripled. It is emphasized that ensuring human rights and freedoms is the highest goal of the state.

In April 2023, a referendum was held in Uzbekistan to change the constitution. The adopted amendments increased the presidential term from 5 to 7 years. The number of terms is still limited to two, but due to a change in the constitution, Mirziyoyev's previous presidencies are not counted. Shortly thereafter, the head of state called early elections. They passed on July 9, 2023. Mirziyoyev won with 87% of the vote on a turnout of almost 80%.

=== Foreign policy ===
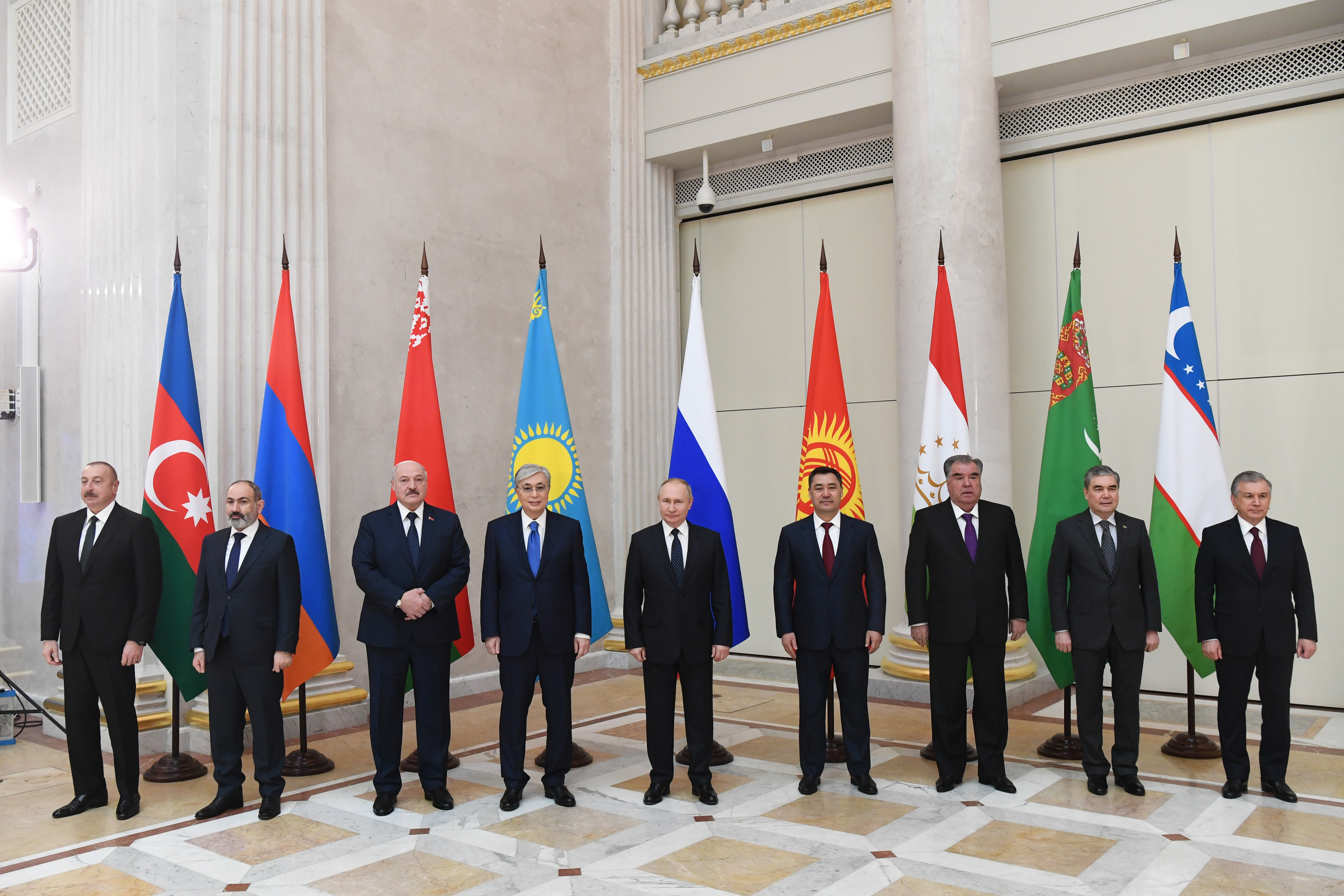
CIS leadership meeting in 2021

Mirziyoyev's foreign policy is much more open than that of his predecessor. Uzbekistan had been practically under international isolation after the Andijan massacre in 2005, and Karimov rarely travelled outside Central Asia and other CIS states. Mirziyoyev promised to conduct an active foreign policy at the beginning of his tenure.

During the first ten months of his tenure, Mirziyoyev visited Kazakhstan four times, Turkmenistan three times, Russia twice, as well as China, Saudi Arabia, the United States, Turkey, and Kyrgyzstan. On various occasions, he met the presidents of Iran, Azerbaijan, Afghanistan, Tajikistan, Bulgaria, and Belarus, as well as the King of Spain. During the CIS Summit in Tashkent in November 2017, he met eight prime ministers of foreign countries.

==== Regional policy ====
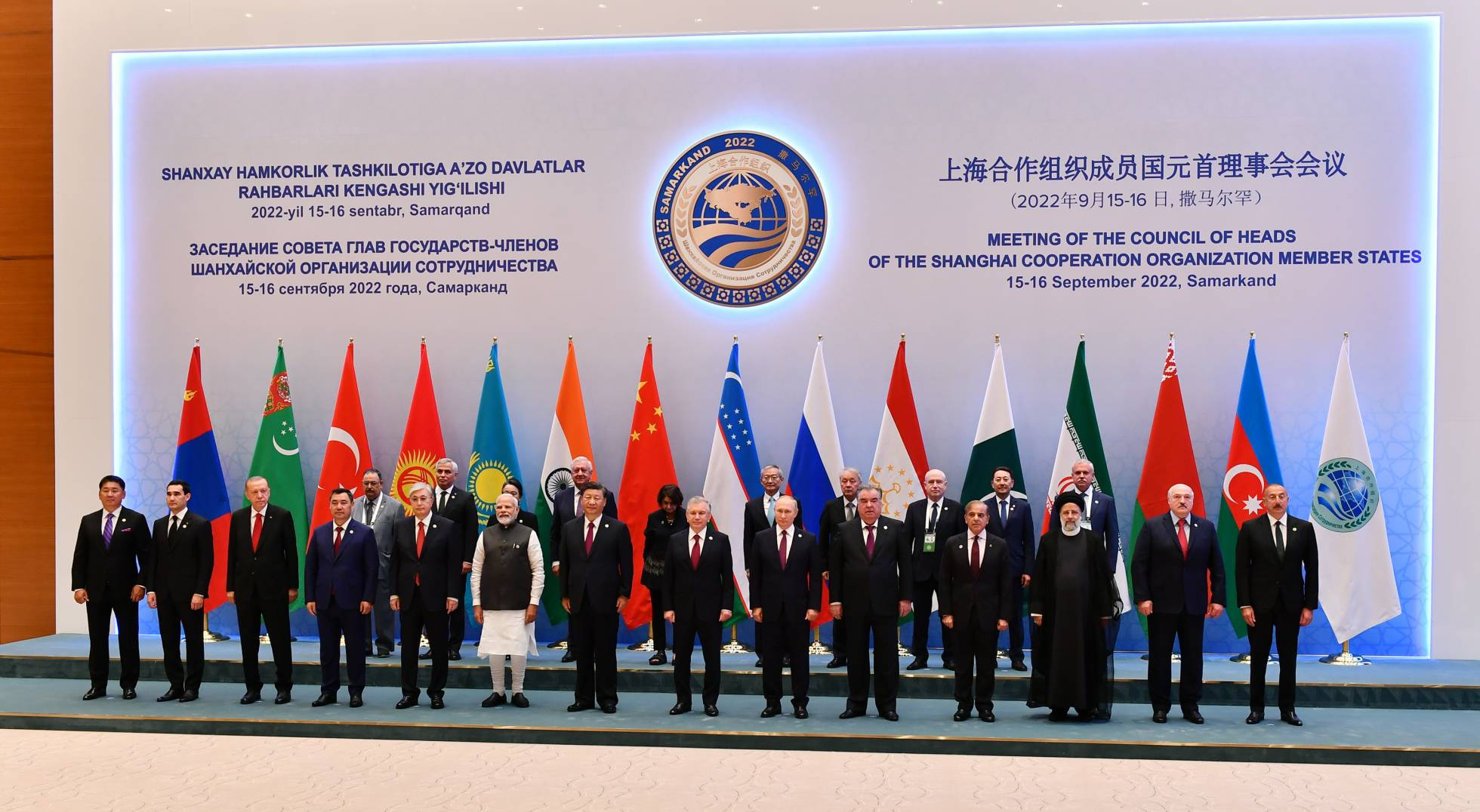
Mirziyoyev at the 2022 Shanghai Cooperation Organisation summit in Samarkand

One of his most significant foreign policy achievements is the gradual improvement of relations with Kyrgyzstan and Tajikistan. On 5 September 2017, just three days after the anniversary of the death of his predecessor, he made a historic visit to Kyrgyzstan. This was the first state visit of an Uzbek president to the neighbouring country since 2000. On 19 September 2017, Mirziyoyev addressed the UN General Assembly for the first time.

In 2018, a large number of foreign leaders visited or were expected to visit Uzbekistan, including the Egyptian President Abdel Fattah el-Sisi, the Turkish President Recep Tayyip Erdoğan, and the Belarusian President Alexander Lukashenko, whose visit took place in September and was his first state visit to the country in 24 years. In March 2018, Mirziyoyev made a visit to Tajikistan, which made him the first Uzbek president to conduct a state visit to Dushanbe since 2000.

In March 2019, Mirziyoyev held a telephone conversation with Nursultan Nazarbayev, who had resigned from office that day. During the call, he expressed regret to the former president, describing him as a "great politician". During a visit to Abu Dhabi in March 2019, Mirziyoyev concluded talks with Crown Prince Mohammed bin Zayed with agreements worth over $10 billion in infrastructure, alternative energy, and agriculture, as well as in other sectors.

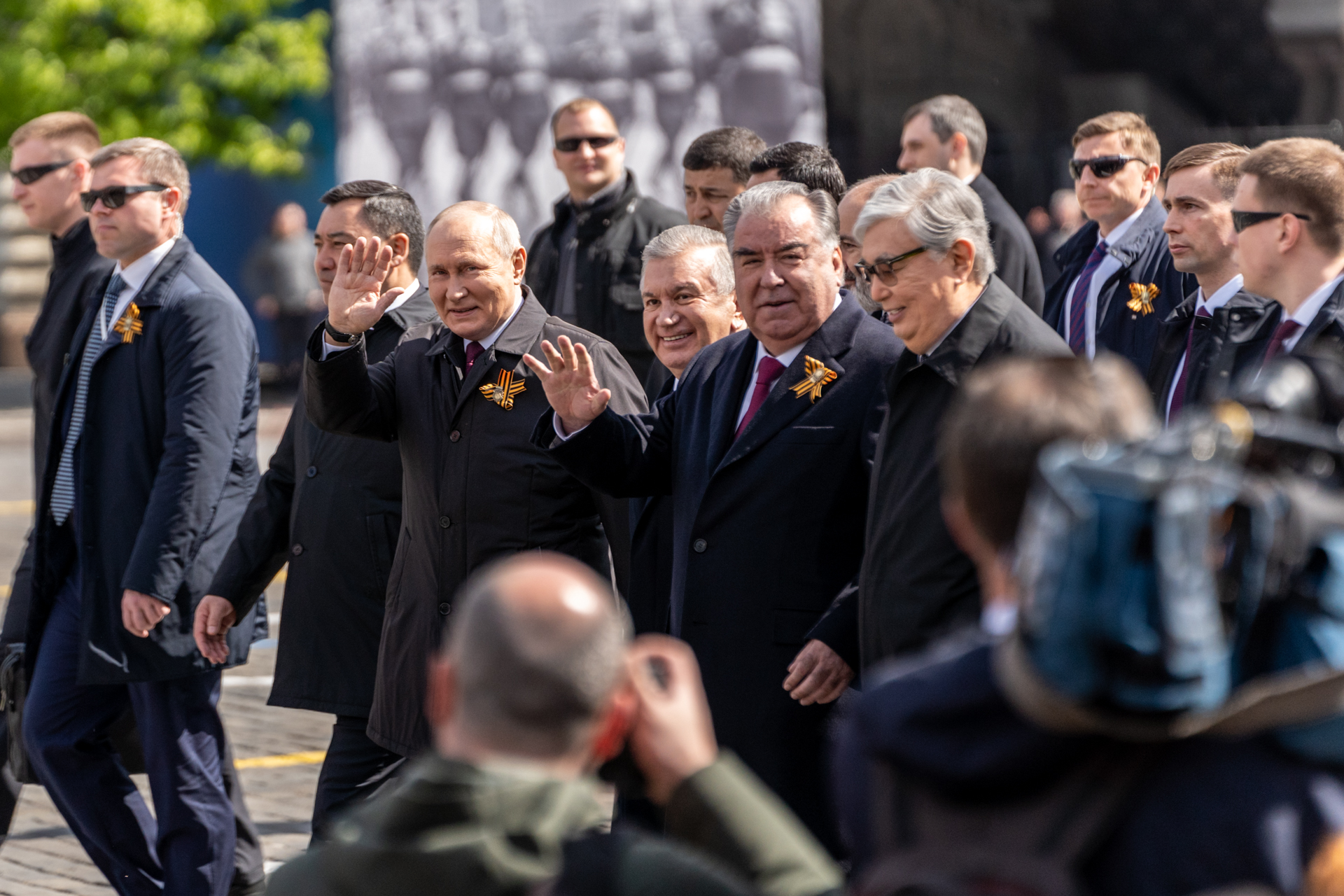
Mirziyoyev, Emomali Rahmon, Kassym-Jomart Tokayev and other post-Soviet leaders at the Moscow Victory Day Parade on 9 May 2023

In 2022 Uzbekistan hosted the 22nd Shanghai Cooperation Organisation Summit in Samarkand. During the summit, which was attended by world leaders Turkish President Recep Tayyip Erdogan, Russian President Vladimir Putin, Chinese President Xi Jinping, Iran's Ebrahim Raisi, Azerbaijan's Ilham Aliyev, presidents of Uzbekistan, Tajikistan, Kyrgyzstan, and Mongolia, and the prime ministers of Pakistan and India, it was noted that the Chinese and Indian leaders chastised President Putin about his role in Ukraine. In preparation for the Summit, the president ordered that the city be redeveloped. This included the construction of a new international airport and a tourism complex that has had mixed reviews.

==== Afghanistan ====
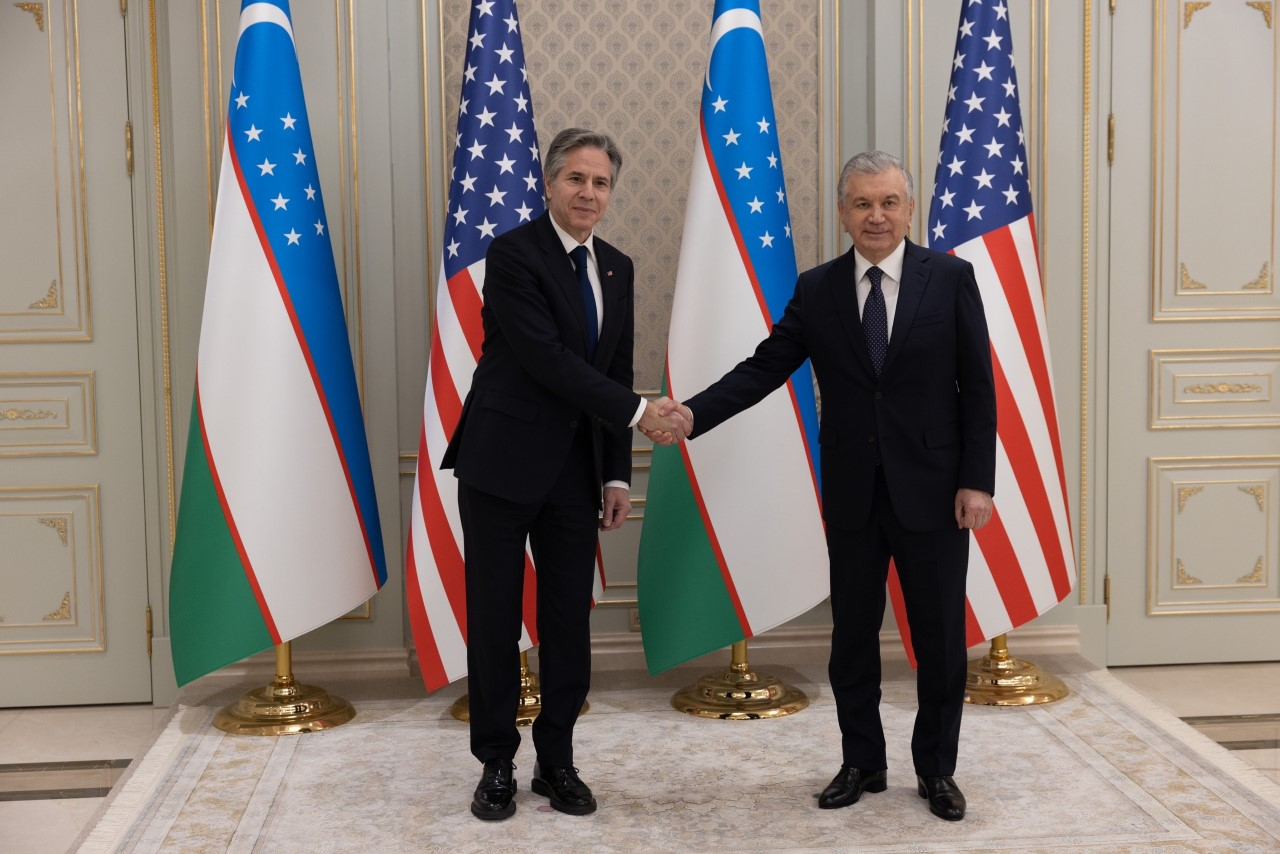
Mirziyoyev with U.S. Secretary of State Antony Blinken on 1 March 2023

Mirziyoyev has also taken on an important role in Afghanistan, offering to host peace talks between the government and the Taliban since March 2018. During the week of 6–10 August 2018, a Taliban delegation visited Tashkent at Mirziyoyev's request to discuss issues including transport, power, and peace in Afghanistan. Mirziyoyev attended the Vibrant Gujarat international investment summit as a key guest, becoming the first Central Asian leader to participate as a partner in the summit. In early 2019, it was announced that Mirziyoyev planned to make official visits to 36 countries throughout the year. Beginning in 2023, the Mirziyoyev administration has engaged in dialogue with the Taliban government regarding the use of water from the Amu Darya, particularly concerning the construction of the Qoshtepa Canal in northern Afghanistan. In August 2024, Prime Minister Abdulla Aripov made a working visit to Kabul – the highest‑ranking foreign leader to do so since the Taliban retook power.

=== Culture policy ===
In October 2020, Mirziyoyev issued a decree to accelerate the full Latinisation of the Uzbek language, outlining language policy for the 2020–2030 period as the country continues an on‑again, off‑again attempt to reform the Uzbek language and broaden its use. Key provisions of the decree included the development of a road map for a full transition to the Uzbek alphabet based on the Latin script, as well as a requirement that government officials be certified in their knowledge of Uzbek by April 2021.

Uzbekistan's historical and cultural heritage is widely promoted through cultural diplomacy efforts. The country's art, culture, and architecture have been showcased at events such as La Biennale di Venezia in 2021 (Mahalla Stories), a ballet performance at Dubai Opera in 2021 (Lazgi – Dance of the Soul and Love), the 59th International Art Exhibition of La Biennale di Venezia in 2022 (featuring the seminal work of Muhammad ibn Musa al‑Khwārizmī), La Biennale di Venezia in 2023 (Unbuild Together), and the exhibition The Splendour of Uzbekistan's Oases at the Louvre in 2022, among others.

== Personal life ==
He has two sisters, a half-brother, and sister. Mirziyoyev is married to Ziroat Mirziyoyeva and has two daughters, a son and six grandchildren. Their eldest daughter, Saida Mirziyoyeva heads the Presidential Administration of Uzbekistan since 2025. Both the eldest son-in-law Oybek Tursunov and the younger son-in-law Otabek Umarov have held or currently hold position in the Administration.

Since coming to power, Mirziyoyev has built a new residence for himself in Qibray District, which includes his own presidential highway, and an interior that is decorated with Argentinian marble slabs and Swarovski crystals.

In February 2021, it was reported that Mirziyoyev was building an exclusive mountain compound, including a new reservoir. The compound, located about 100 kilometers by car from Tashkent, includes a luxurious mansion built for Mirziyoyev and his relatives. Two sources estimated the cost of the development at several hundred million dollars, though only a handful of publicly available official documents make reference to the compound and the adjacent reservoir, which were largely completed by 2019.

== Published works ==
Year	Title (Uzbek)	English title	Publisher	Notes
2017	Buyuk kelajagimizni mard va olijanob xalqimiz bilan birga quramiz	We Will Build Our Great Future Together with Our Brave and Noble People	Oʻzbekiston Publishing House (Tashkent)	Collection of speeches and programmatic statements
2017	Tanqidiy tahlil, qat’iy tartib-intizom va shaxsiy javobgarlik	Critical Analysis, Strict Discipline and Personal Responsibility	Presidential Publications (Tashkent)	Based on keynote address to the Cabinet of Ministers
2020	Oʻzbekiston Respublikasi Prezidenti Shavkat Mirziyoyevning Oliy Majlisga Murojaatnomasi	Address of the President of the Republic of Uzbekistan to the Oliy Majlis	Oʻzbekiston Publishing House (Tashkent)	Annual presidential address published as a book
2024	Hozirgi zamon va Yangi O‘zbekiston	Current Times and the New Uzbekistan	Oʻzbekiston Publishing House (Tashkent)	Collected policy speeches and strategic texts

== Electoral history ==
Electoral history of Shavkat Mirziyoyev
Year	Office	Party	Votes received				Result
Year	Office	Party	Total	%	P.	Swing	Result
2016	President of Uzbekistan	OʻzLiDeP	15,906,724	90.29%	1st	—N/a	Won
2021	President of Uzbekistan	OʻzLiDeP	12,988,964	80.31%	1st	-9.98	Won
2023	President of Uzbekistan	IND	13,625,055	87.71%	1st	+7.40	Won

== Awards ==
National

- Order "Mehnat shuhrati"
- Order "Fidokorona xizmatlari uchun"

Foreign

- Order of Danaker (Kyrgyzstan, 22 November 2017)
- Honored Citizen of Seoul (South Korea, 14 April 2018)
- Prize “For Merits to Eurasia” (Turkey, 24 April 2018)
- Order of Friendship (Kazakhstan, 15 March 2018)
- Honorary Doctorate from Nagoya University (Japan, 18 December 2019)
- Order of the Crown (Tajikistan, 10 June 2021)
- Order of Alexander Nevsky (Russia, 24 July 2022)
- Honorary Badge of the Commonwealth of Independent States (13 October 2023)
- Supreme Order of Turkic World (3 November 2023)
- Order of the Republic of Türkiye
- Order of the Golden Eagle (Kazakhstan, 8 August 2024)
- Order “Duslyk” (Tatarstan, 24 October 2024)
- Grand Officer of the Legion of Honour (France, 13 March 2025)
- Order "Hyzmatdaşlygy ösdürmäge goşandy üçin" (Turkmenistan, 5 August 2025)
- Order “An-Nahda” (Jordan, 26 August 2025
- Nishan e Pakistan (Pakistan, 6 February 2026 )
- Order of the Golden Fleece (2026)
- Order of Republic of Serbia (2026)

== See also ==
- List of heads of the executive by approval rating

== Notes ==
Political offices
Preceded by Oʻtkir Sultonov	Prime Minister of Uzbekistan; 2003–2016	Succeeded by Abdulla Aripov
Preceded by Nigmatilla Yuldashev as Acting president	President of Uzbekistan; 2016–present	Incumbent
Party political offices
Preceded by Islam Karimov	UzLiDeP nominee for President of Uzbekistan; 2016, 2021	Most recent
Diplomatic posts
Preceded by Recep Tayyip Erdoğan	Chairman of the Organization of Turkic States; 2022–present	Incumbent
