= Constitutional Court of Uzbekistan =

Supreme constitutional court of Uzbekistan

The Constitutional Court of the Republic of Uzbekistan (Uzbek: Ўзбекистон Республикаси Конституциявий суди, Russian: Конституционный суд Республики Узбекистан) is the supreme constitutional court of Uzbekistan. Its tasks include reviewing whether proposed laws conflict with the Constitution of Uzbekistan, and whether laws of the Republic of Karakalpakstan conflict with the laws of the Republic of Uzbekistan. Under Article 95 of the Constitution, it is also tasked with authority to approve the President of Uzbekistan's decision to dissolve the Oliy Majlis. The court's decisions are final and unappealable.

The court is composed of seven judges, including a chairman and a deputy chairman. According to the Constitution of Uzbekistan, one of the judges must be a representative of Karakalpakstan. Judges are elected to five-year terms by the Senate of Uzbekistan, which votes by majority on candidates nominated by the president and recommended by the Supreme Judicial Council.

The judges elect the chairman and deputy chairman from among themselves. Since 2014, the chairman of the court has been Bakhtiyar Mirbabaev, who was re-elected in 2017.

The law establishing the Constitutional Court was adopted on May 6, 1993. A second law was adopted in 1995, and the first judges were elected to the court in December 1995. The current law on the Constitutional Court was adopted by the Supreme Assembly in 2017.
