= Supreme Court of Uzbekistan =

Most senior body of civil, criminal, and administrative law in the Republic of Uzbekistan

- Oʻzbekiston Respublikasi Oliy sudi Верховный суд Республики Узбекистан
- Emblem of Uzbekistan
- Established: 1991
- Jurisdiction: Uzbekistan
- Location: Abdulla Qodiriy Street, Tashkent
- Authorised by: Ministry of Justice
- Website: Official site

Chairman of the Supreme Court
- Currently: Bakhtiyor Djahangirovich Islamov
- Since: August 10, 2022

The Supreme Court of the Republic of Uzbekistan is the highest judicial authority in Uzbekistan for civil, criminal, and administrative legal proceedings. The establishment and functioning of the Supreme Court are regulated by the Constitution of the Republic of Uzbekistan (Article 110), the Law on Courts (new version, December 14, 2000), the Civil Procedural and Criminal Procedural Codes, as well as other legislative documents.

The Supreme Court of the Republic of Uzbekistan has the right to oversee the judicial activities of the Supreme Courts of the Republic of Karakalpakstan, regional, city, inter-district, district courts, and military courts. The Supreme Court conducts cases as a first-instance court and in the supervisory order. The Supreme Court consists of the Chairman of the Supreme Court, the first deputy chairman, deputy chairmen, the chairmen of judicial panels, and judges.

The Supreme Court of the Republic of Uzbekistan has the legislative initiative right.

Structure of the Supreme Court The Supreme Court of the Republic of Uzbekistan operates with the Supreme Court Plenary, the Board, the Civil Cases Judicial Panel, the Criminal Cases Judicial Panel, and the Military Panel. The Supreme Court Plenary is the highest judicial body, convened every four months, and consists of judges of the Supreme Court and the chairmen of the Supreme Courts of the Republic of Karakalpakstan. The Supreme Court Plenary reviews cases under the supervisory procedure, generalizes judicial practices, issues clarifications on the application of laws, and approves the composition of the Supreme Court’s Board, judicial panels, and their chairpersons based on proposals from the Chairman of the Supreme Court.

The Supreme Court Board is composed of a certain number of judges from the Supreme Court of Uzbekistan and holds meetings at least once a month. The judicial panels of the Supreme Court review cases in first-instance, appellate, cassation, and supervisory procedures, analyze judicial practices, generalize them, propose improvements to legal documents, and analyze judicial statistics.

The Chairman, Deputy Chairmen, and Judges of the Supreme Court of the Republic of Uzbekistan are elected for a five-year term by the Senate of the Supreme Assembly (Oliy Majlis) based on proposals from the President of the Republic of Uzbekistan.

Publications The Supreme Court of the Republic of Uzbekistan publishes the "Supreme Court Bulletin of the Republic of Uzbekistan" (since 1989 in Uzbek and Russian) and the Plenary Decisions of the Supreme Court. It is also the publisher of the newspaper “Power is in Justice”.
