= Constitution of Uzbekistan =

Supreme law of the Republic of Uzbekistan

Constitution of the Republic of Uzbekistan

Overview
- Jurisdiction: Uzbekistan
- Created: 1990-1992
- Presented: 26 September 1992
- Ratified: 8 December 1992
- Date effective: 8 December 1992; 33 years ago
- System: Unitary semi-presidential republic

Government structure
- Branches: 3
- Chambers: Bicameral
- Executive: President
- Judiciary: Constitutional, Supreme, Higher Economic, Districts

History
- First legislature: 1995
- First executive: 1 September 1991 (Note: The role of the President first formed on 24 March 1990, as the President of the Uzbek SSR.)
- Amendments: 11 (Note: There have been numerous changes to specific articles since 1992, broken down by year, there have been amendments in: 1993, 2002, 2003, 2007, 2008, 2011, 2017, 2018, 2019, 2021, and 2023(Held referendum).)
- Last amended: 30 April 2023
- Citation: The Constitution of the Republic of Uzbekistan, LexUz, 1 May 2023
- Commissioned by: Supreme Soviet of the Uzbek Soviet Socialist Republic
- Author: Constitutional Comission

Full text
- Constitution of Uzbekistan (2003) at Wikisource

The Constitution of Uzbekistan (Uzbek: Oʻzbekiston Respublikasining Konstitutsiyasi, Ўзбекистон Республикасининг Конституцияси) was adopted on 8 December 1992 on the 11th session of the Supreme Council of Uzbekistan. It replaced the Constitution of the Republic of Uzbekistan of 1978. It is the supreme law of the Republic of Uzbekistan (Article 15). The Constitution of Uzbekistan contains six parts and it is further divided into 26 chapters.

== Overview ==
The Constitution of Uzbekistan nominally creates a separation of powers among a strong presidency, the legislature (the Supreme Assembly of Uzbekistan or Oliy Majlis), and a judiciary.

The President of Uzbekistan, who is directly elected to a five-year term that can be renewed once, is the head of state and is granted supreme executive power by the constitution. As commander in chief of the armed forces, the President may declare a state of emergency or of war. The President is empowered to nominate a candidate of the prime minister for consideration of chambers of the Oliy Majlis and appoint full cabinet of ministers and the judges of the three national courts, subject to the approval of the Oliy Majlis, and to appoint all members of lower courts. The President also has the power to dissolve the parliament, in effect negating the Oliy Majlis's veto power over presidential nominations in a power struggle situation.

The 150 deputies to the Legislative Chamber (lower house) of the bicameral Oliy Majlis, the highest legislative body, are elected to five-year terms. The body may be dismissed by the President with the concurrence of the Constitutional Court; because that court is subject to presidential appointment, the dismissal clause weights the balance of power heavily toward the executive branch. The 100-member Senate includes 16 directly nominated by the President. The Oliy Majlis enacts legislation, which may be initiated by the President, within the parliament, by the high courts, by the procurator general (highest law enforcement official in the country), or by the government of the Autonomous Republic of Karakalpakstan. Besides legislation, international treaties, presidential decrees, and states of emergency also must be ratified by the Oliy Majlis.

The national judiciary includes the Constitutional Court, the Supreme Court, and the High Economic Court. Lower court systems exist at the regional, district, and town levels. Judges at all levels are appointed by the President and approved by the Oliy Majlis. Nominally independent of the other branches of government, the courts remain under the effective control of the executive branch. As in the system of the Soviet era, the procurator general and his regional and local equivalents are both the state's chief prosecuting officials and the chief investigators of criminal cases, a configuration that limits the pretrial rights of defendants.

== Part I. Fundamental principles ==
=== Chapter 1 – State Sovereignty ===
– Article 1: Uzbekistan is a sovereign democratic republic. Both names of the state – the Republic of Uzbekistan and Uzbekistan – shall be equivalent.

– Article 2: The state shall express the will of the people and serve their interests. State bodies and officials shall be accountable to the society and the citizens.

– Article 3:

- The Republic of Uzbekistan shall determine its national-state and administrative-territorial structure, its structure of state authority and administration, and shall pursue independent home and foreign policies.
- The state frontier and the territory of Uzbekistan shall be inviolable and indivisible.

– Article 4: The state language of the Republic of Uzbekistan shall be Uzbek. The Republic of Uzbekistan shall ensure a respectful attitude towards the languages, customs and traditions of all nationalities and ethnic groups living on its territory, and create the conditions necessary for their development.

– Article 5: The Republic of Uzbekistan shall have its state symbols – the flag, the emblem, and the anthem-sanctioned by the law.

– Article 6: The capital of the Republic of Uzbekistan shall be the city of Tashkent.

=== Chapter 2 – Democracy ===
– Article 7: The people are the sole source of state power. State power in the Republic of Uzbekistan shall be exercised in the interests of the people and solely by the bodies empowered therefore by the Constitution of the Republic of Uzbekistan and the laws passed on its basis. Any seizure of powers belonging to state authority, suspension or termination of activity of the bodies of state authority contrary to the procedure prescribed by the Constitution, as well as the formation of any new or parallel bodies of state authority shall be regarded as unconstitutional and punishable by law.

– Article 8: The people of Uzbekistan consists of the citizens of the Republic of Uzbekistan irrespective of their nationality.

– Article 9: Major matters of public and state life shall be submitted for a nationwide discussion and put to a direct vote of the people (a referendum). The procedure for holding referendums shall be specified by law.

– Article 10: Only the National Assembly (Oliy Majlis) and the President of the Republic, elected by the people, can act on behalf of the people of Uzbekistan. No part of society, political party, public association, movement, or individual may act on behalf of the people of Uzbekistan.

– Article 11: The state power in Uzbekistan is divided into legislative, executive, and judicial branches.

– Article 12: Public life in the Republic of Uzbekistan develops on the basis of diversity of political institutions, ideologies, and opinions. No single ideology may be established as a state ideology.

– Article 13: Democracy in the Republic of Uzbekistan is based on general human principles, which assign the highest value to man, to human life, to freedom, honor, dignity, and other inalienable rights. Democratic rights and freedoms are protected by the Constitution and the laws.

– Article 14: The state bases its activity on the principles of social justice and legality in the interest of well-being of man and society.

=== Chapter 3 – Supremacy of the Constitution and the Law ===
– Article 15: The Constitution and the laws of the Republic of Uzbekistan shall have absolute supremacy in the Republic of Uzbekistan. The state, its bodies, officials, public associations and citizens shall act in accordance with the Constitution and the laws.

– Article 16: None of the provisions of the present Constitution shall be interpreted in a way detrimental to the rights and interests of the Republic of Uzbekistan. None of the laws or normative legal acts shall run counter to the norms and principles established by the Constitution.

=== Chapter 4 – Foreign Policy ===
– Article 17:

- The Republic of Uzbekistan shall have full rights in international relations. Its foreign policy shall be based on the principles of sovereign equality of the states, non-use of force or threat of its use, inviolability of frontiers, peaceful settlement of disputes, non-interference in the internal affairs of other states, and other universally recognized norms of international law.
- The Republic may form alliances, join or withdraw from unions and other inter-state organizations proceeding from the ultimate interests of the state and the people, their well-being and security.

== Part II. Basic human and civil rights, freedoms and duties ==
=== Chapter 5 – General Provisions ===
– Article 18:

- All citizens of the Republic of Uzbekistan shall have equal rights and freedoms, and shall be equal before the law, without discrimination by sex, race, nationality, language, religion, social origin, convictions, individual and social status.
- Any privileges may be granted solely by the law and shall conform to the principles of social justice.

– Article 19: Both citizens of the Republic of Uzbekistan and the state shall be bound by mutual rights and mutual responsibility. Citizens’ rights and freedoms, established by the Constitution and the laws, shall be inalienable. No one shall have the power to deny a citizen his rights and freedoms, or to infringe on them except by the sentence of a court.

– Article 20: The exercise of rights and freedoms by a citizen shall not encroach on the lawful interests, rights and freedoms of other citizens, the state or society.

=== Chapter 6 – Citizenship ===
– Article 21: In the Republic of Uzbekistan, uniform citizenship shall be established throughout its territory. Citizenship in the Republic of Uzbekistan shall be equal for all regardless of the grounds of its acquisition. Every citizen of the Republic of Karakalpakstan shall be a citizen of the Republic of Uzbekistan. The grounds and procedure for acquiring and forfeiting citizenship shall be defined by law.

– Article 22: The Republic of Uzbekistan shall guarantee legal protection to all its citizens both on the territory of the republic and abroad.

– Article 23:

- Foreign citizens and stateless persons, during their stay on the territory of the Republic of Uzbekistan, shall be guaranteed the rights and freedoms in accordance with the norms of international law.
- They shall perform the duties established by the Constitution, laws, and international agreements signed by the Republic of Uzbekistan.

=== Chapter 7 – Personal Rights and Freedoms ===
– Article 24: The right to exist is the inalienable right of every human being. Attempts on anyone's life shall be regarded as the gravest crime.

– Article 25: Everyone shall have the right to freedom and inviolability of the person. No one may be arrested or taken into custody except on lawful grounds.

– Article 26: No one may be adjudged guilty of a crime except by the sentence of a court and in conformity with the law. Such a person shall be guaranteed the right to legal defense during open court proceedings. No one may be subject to torture, violence or any other cruel or humiliating treatment. No one may be subject to any medical or scientific experiments without his consent.

– Article 27:

- Everyone shall be entitled to protection against encroachments on his honour, dignity, and interference in his private life, and shall be guaranteed inviolability of the home.
- No one may enter a home, carry out a search or an examination, or violate the privacy of correspondence and telephone conversations, except on lawful grounds and in accordance with the procedure prescribed by law.

– Article 28: Any citizen of the Republic of Uzbekistan shall have the right to freedom of movement on the territory of the Republic, as well as a free entry to and exit from it, except in the events specified by law.

– Article 29:

- Everyone shall be guaranteed freedom of thought, speech and convictions. Everyone shall have the right to seek, obtain and disseminate any information, except that which is directed against the existing constitutional system and in some other instances specified by law.
- Freedom of opinion and its expression may be restricted by law if any state or other secret is involved.

– Article 30: All state bodies, public associations and officials in the Republic of Uzbekistan shall allow any citizen access to documents, resolutions and other materials, relating to their rights and interests.

– Article 31: Freedom of conscience is guaranteed to all. Everyone shall have the right to profess or not to profess any religion. Any compulsory imposition of religion shall be impermissible.

== Other chapters ==
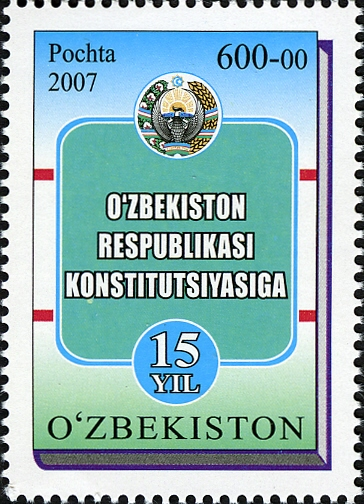

- Human rights, freedoms, and obligations are the subject of Chapters V through XI (Articles 18–52)
- Social and family institutions are the subject of Chapters XIII and XIV (Articles 56–67)
- The legislative branch (Oliy Majlis) is dealt with in Chapter XVIII (Articles 76–88)
- The institution of the President is the subject of Chapter XIX (Articles 89–97)
- The executive branch (the Cabinet of Ministers) is the subject of Chapter XX (Article 98)
- Local government is dealt with in Chapter XXI (Articles 99–105)
- The judicial branch is the subject of XXII and XXIV (Articles 106–116, 118–121)
- The electoral system is described in Article 117
- The procedure for changing the Constitution is set forth in Part 6 (Articles 127–128)

== 2023 Referendum ==
A referendum on the adoption of the draft Constitution in a new edition is scheduled for April 30, 2023. The draft constitutional law on the Constitution of Uzbekistan in the new edition was approved by both houses of the Parliament (Oliy Majlis) of Uzbekistan and published on the Internet, as well as in the newspapers Khalk Suzi and Narodnoe Slovo. The new version of the constitution should come into force from the day of the official publication of the results of the referendum by the Central Election Commission. The number of articles of the Basic Law in the draft has been increased from 128 in the current Constitution to 155.

The adoption of the draft Constitution in the new edition will allow the incumbent president to "reset". The term of office of the president in the project has been increased from 5 to 7 years. The rule that the same person cannot be the president of Uzbekistan for more than two consecutive terms has been retained. However, if the president holds office at the time of the corresponding change in the Constitution, their previous terms are reset and they can again be elected president.

According to the document, the provisions of the constitutional law that change and (or) otherwise affect the terms of office, the procedure and (or) conditions for the election (appointment) of state officials, apply to persons holding these positions at the time of entry into force of this law.

“The provisions of this Constitutional Law that change and (or) otherwise affect the terms of office, the procedure and (or) conditions for the election (appointment) of public officials shall apply to persons holding these positions at the time of entry into force of this Constitutional Law, and these persons have the right to be elected (appointed) on an equal basis with other citizens of the Republic of Uzbekistan to the specified positions in accordance with the requirements of the Constitution of the Republic of Uzbekistan, including as amended by this Constitutional Law, and regardless of the number of terms in a row during which these persons held and (or) occupy these positions at the time of entry of this Constitutional Law into force,” the document says.

In addition to the president, “these persons” include the speaker of the Legislative Chamber, the chairman of the Senate, the chairmen of the councils of people's deputies of regions, districts and cities, khokims, the chairman and deputy chairman of the Supreme Court, the chairman and deputy chairman of the Supreme Judicial Council, the chairman of the Central Election Commission and the prosecutor general.

== See also ==
- Constitution of Karakalpakstan
