= List of political parties in Uzbekistan =

This article lists political parties in Uzbekistan, a post-Soviet nation dominated by the supporters of the President of Uzbekistan. Despite small reforms and openness in the 2010s, no true opposition parties are allowed and every registered party supports the incumbent president and former prime minister Shavkat Mirziyoyev as well as the founder of the Republic of Uzbekistan and former president Islam Karimov.

== Parliamentary parties ==
Political party		Founded	Leader	Ideology	Political position	Deputies	Senators
UzLiDeP; OʻzLiDeP	Uzbekistan Liberal Democratic Party; Oʻzbekiston Liberal Demokratik Partiyasi	2003	Abdulla Aripov	Economic liberalism	Centre-right	53 / 150	41 / 100
UzMTDP; OʻzMTDP	Uzbekistan National Revival Democratic Party; Oʻzbekiston “Milliy Tiklanish” Demokratik Partiyasi	1995	Alisher Qodirov	National conservatism	Right-wing	36 / 150	0 / 100
ASDP	Justice Social Democratic Party; Adolat Sotsial Demokratik Partiyasi	1995	Bahrom Abdukhalimov	Social democracy	Centre-left	24 / 150	0 / 100
PDP; O'zXDP	People's Democratic Party of Uzbekistan; O'zbekistan Xalq Demokratik Partiyasi	1991	Ulugbek Inoyatov	Big tent	Centre	22 / 150	28 / 100
EPU; O'zEP	Ecological Party of Uzbekistan; O'zbekiston ekologik partiyasi	2008	Narzullo Oblomuradov	Green politics	Left-wing	15 / 150	0 / 100

- United Nations 2016

== Defunct parties ==
=== Banned parties ===
Party	Abbr.	Ideology	Political position	Leader	Years active
Islamic Movement of Uzbekistan; O'zbekiston Islom Harakati	IMU	Islamism; Pan-Islamism; Salafi Jihadism; Anti-Zionism; Historical: Anti-Islam Karimov		Tohir Yoʻldosh †; Juma Namangani †; Abu Usman Adil †; Usman Ghazi †; Samatov Mamasoli (noms de guerre: Abu Ali) (POW)	1 August 1998 – 6 August 2015 13 June 2016 – 2023 (split factions)
Hizb ut-Tahrir; Партия ва озод шудан	HT	Pan-Islamism; Islamism; Muslim supremacism; Caliphalism; Salafism; Jihadism; Desecularization; Anti-Western sentiment; Anti-nationalism; Antisemitism; Anti-Zionism; Anti-democracy; Anti-liberalism; Anti-capitalism; Anti-communism	Far-right	Ata Abu Rashta	1992–2024
Islamic Renaissance Party of Uzbekistan; O'zbekiston Islom Uyg'onish Partiyasi	IRPU	Islamism; Pan-Islamism; Jihadism; Clericalism; Anti-Russian sentiment; Anti-Americanism; Anti-Atlanticism; Anti-communism; Anti-Zionism		Abdullah Utabay	1990–1996
Erk Democratic Party; Erk Demokratik Partiyasi	EDP	National conservatism	Right-wing	Muhammad Salih	1990–1993
Birdamlik People's Democratic Party “Birdamlik” xalq-demokratik partiyasi		Economic liberalism; Populism	Centre-right	Bakhodir Khan Turkistan	2004–2024
Unity Party; Birlik partiyasi		Conservative liberalism; National liberalism; Pan-Turkism	Centre-right	Abdurakhim Pulat	1988–1994

=== Former parties ===
Party	Abbr.	Ideology	Political position	Leader	Years active
Communist Party of Uzbekistan; Ўзбекистон Коммунистик Партияси	UzKP	Communism; Marxism–Leninism	Far-left	Islam Karimov	1925–1991
Progress of the Fatherland Party; Vatan Taraqqiyoti Partiyasi	VTP	Social conservatism; Progressivism; Economic liberalism; Secularism; Anti-communism	Centre-right	Axtam Tursunov	1992–2000
Self-Sacrifice National Democratic Party; Fidokorlar milliy demokratik partiyasi	FMDP	Conservatism	Right-wing	Axtam Tursunov	1999–2008

== See also ==
- List of political parties by country

== Bibliography ==
- Abdurasulov, Abdujalil (20 December 2019). "Questions over Uzbekistan's new era of 'openness'". BBC News.
- "What ideas do political parties advance?". Uzbekistan Today. 15 November 2016 – via The Permanent Mission of the Republic of Uzbekistan to the United Nations.
