= Prime Minister of Uzbekistan =

Head of government

Prime Minister of the Republic of Uzbekistan
- O‘zbekiston bosh vaziri Ўзбекистон бош вазири
- Emblem of Uzbekistan

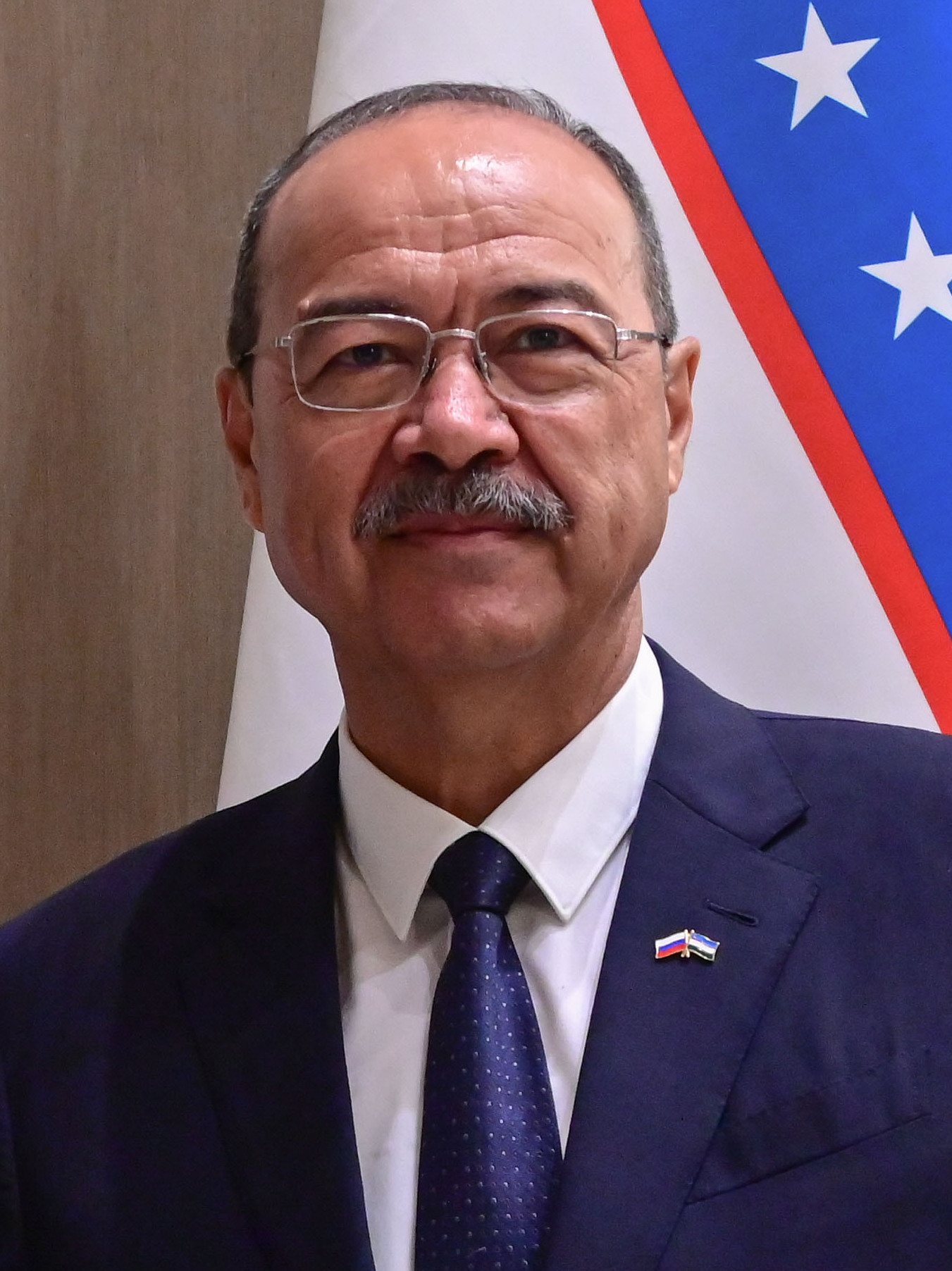
- Incumbent; Abdulla Aripov since 14 December 2016
- Style: "Mr. Prime Minister" (Uzbek: Janob Bosh vazir)
- Member of: Cabinet of Ministers; National Security Council
- Seat: Government House, Mustaqillik Square, Tashkent
- Nominator: Largest political party (or bloc of parties) in parliament.
- Appointer: The president; with Legislative Chamber's advice and consent
- Term length: 5 years
- Precursor: Chairman of the Council of Ministers of the Uzbek SSR (1946–1990)
- Inaugural holder: Abdulhashim Mutalov
- Formation: 17 February 1925; 8 January 1992 (current form)
- Deputy: First Deputy Prime Minister

This is a list of prime ministers of Uzbekistan (Uzbek: O‘zbekiston bosh vaziri), from the establishment of the office in 1925 as the chairman of the Council of Ministers of the Uzbek SSR to the present day.

The current prime minister is Abdulla Aripov. He assumed the office on 14 December 2016. The Government House on Mustakillik Square in Tashkent serves as the prime minister's primary workplace and residence.

== Powers and tasks ==
The prime minister of the Republic of Uzbekistan serves as the leader of the Cabinet of Ministers, overseeing and managing its operations. This individual holds personal accountability for the Cabinet's effectiveness, presides over its meetings, endorses decisions, and represents the Cabinet in international relations on behalf of the president of Uzbekistan. The Prime Minister engages in negotiations, signs intergovernmental treaties, agreements, and memoranda, subject to the president's approval. Responsibilities also include the allocation of duties among deputy prime ministers, making decisions on non-Cabinet meeting matters related to state and economic management, and proposing Cabinet members to the president after Legislative Chamber approval.

Additionally, the prime minister suggests appointments and dismissals of regional governors to the president, coordinates the activities of government bodies, resolves disagreements, and presents an annual report to both chambers of the Oliy Majlis on socio-economic development and priorities. The prime minister issues orders and recommendations within their purview, keeps the president informed, and temporarily assumes presidential duties within Uzbekistan when the president is abroad. In the prime minister's absence, the first deputy prime minister or, by consensus, one of the deputy prime ministers temporarily fulfills their responsibilities.

== List of prime ministers of Uzbekistan (1925–present) ==
=== Uzbek Soviet Socialist Republic (1924–1991) ===
==== Chairman of the Council of People's Commissars ====
- Fayzulla Xoʻjayev (17 February 1925 – 17 June 1937)
- Abdullah Karimov (26 July – 1 October 1937)
- Sultan Segizbayev (2 October 1937 – July 1938)
- Abdudzhabar Abdurakhmanov (23 July 1938 – 15 March 1946)

==== Chairmen of the Council of Ministers ====
- Abdudzhabar Abdurakhmanov (15 March 1946 – 21 August 1950)
- Abdurrazak Mavlyanov (21 August 1950 – 18 May 1951)
- Nuritdin Mukhitdinov (18 May 1951 – 7 April 1953) (1st time)
- Usman Yusupov (7 April 1953 – 18 December 1954)
- Nuritdin Mukhitdinov (18 December 1954 – 22 December 1955) (2nd time)
- Sobir Kamolov (22 December 1955 – 30 December 1957)
- Mansur Mirza-Akhmedov (30 December 1957 – 16 March 1959)
- Arif Alimov (16 March 1959 – 27 September 1961)
- Rahmankul Kurbanov (27 September 1961 – 25 February 1971)
- Narmakhonmadi Khudayberdyev (25 February 1971 – 3 December 1984)
- Gayrat Kadyrov (3 December 1984 – 21 October 1989)
- Mirakhat Mirkasimov (21 October 1989 – 24 March 1990)
- Shukrullo Mirsaidov (24 March – 1 November 1990)

=== Republic of Uzbekistan (1991–present) ===
==== Prime ministers ====
People's Democratic Party of Uzbekistan
Uzbekistan National Revival Democratic Party
Liberal Democratic Party
Self-Sacrifice National Democratic Party

No.	Portrait	Name (Birth–Death)	Term of office			Political party	Elected	Cabinet(s)	President(s)	Ref.
No.	Portrait	Name (Birth–Death)	Took office	Left office	Time in office	Political party	Elected	Cabinet(s)	President(s)	Ref.
1		Abdulhashim Mutalov (born 1947)	8 January 1992	21 December 1995	3 years, 347 days	XDP	–		Islam Karimov (1991–2016)	
1		Abdulhashim Mutalov (born 1947)	8 January 1992	21 December 1995	3 years, 347 days	XDP	1994–95		Islam Karimov (1991–2016)	
2		Utkir Sultonov (1939–2015)	21 December 1995	12 December 2003	7 years, 356 days	XDP	–		Islam Karimov (1991–2016)	
2		Utkir Sultonov (1939–2015)	21 December 1995	12 December 2003	7 years, 356 days	XDP	1999		Islam Karimov (1991–2016)	
3		Shavkat Mirziyoyev (born 1957)	12 December 2003	14 December 2016	13 years, 2 days	FMDP	–		Islam Karimov (1991–2016)	
3		Shavkat Mirziyoyev (born 1957)	12 December 2003	14 December 2016	13 years, 2 days	FMDP	2004–05		Islam Karimov (1991–2016)	
3		Shavkat Mirziyoyev (born 1957)	12 December 2003	14 December 2016	13 years, 2 days	OʻzMTDP	2009–10		Islam Karimov (1991–2016)	
3		Shavkat Mirziyoyev (born 1957)	12 December 2003	14 December 2016	13 years, 2 days	OʻzMTDP	2014–15		Islam Karimov (1991–2016)	
4		Abdulla Aripov (born 1961)	14 December 2016	Incumbent	9 years, 308 days	OʻzLiDeP	–		Nigmatilla Yuldashev (2016)	
4		Abdulla Aripov (born 1961)	14 December 2016	Incumbent	9 years, 308 days	OʻzLiDeP	2019–20		Shavkat Mirziyoyev (2016–present)	
4		Abdulla Aripov (born 1961)	14 December 2016	Incumbent	9 years, 308 days	OʻzLiDeP	2024		Shavkat Mirziyoyev (2016–present)	

== See also ==
- List of leaders of Uzbekistan
- President of Uzbekistan
- Vice President of Uzbekistan
