= Supreme Soviet of the Uzbek Soviet Socialist Republic =

Legislature of the Uzbek SSR from 1938 to 1991

Supreme Soviet of the Uzbek SSR Ўзбекистон ССР Олий Совети (Uzbek) Верховный Совет Узбекской ССР (Russian)
- (Uzbek Soviet Socialist Republic) Uzbek SSR (1938-1991)
- Emblem of the Uzbek Soviet Socialist Republic

Type
- Type: Supreme Soviet

History
- Established: 1938
- Disbanded: 1991
- Preceded by: All-Uzbek Congress of Soviets
- Succeeded by: Supreme Council of the Republic of Uzbekistan

Elections
- Last election: 1990

Meeting place
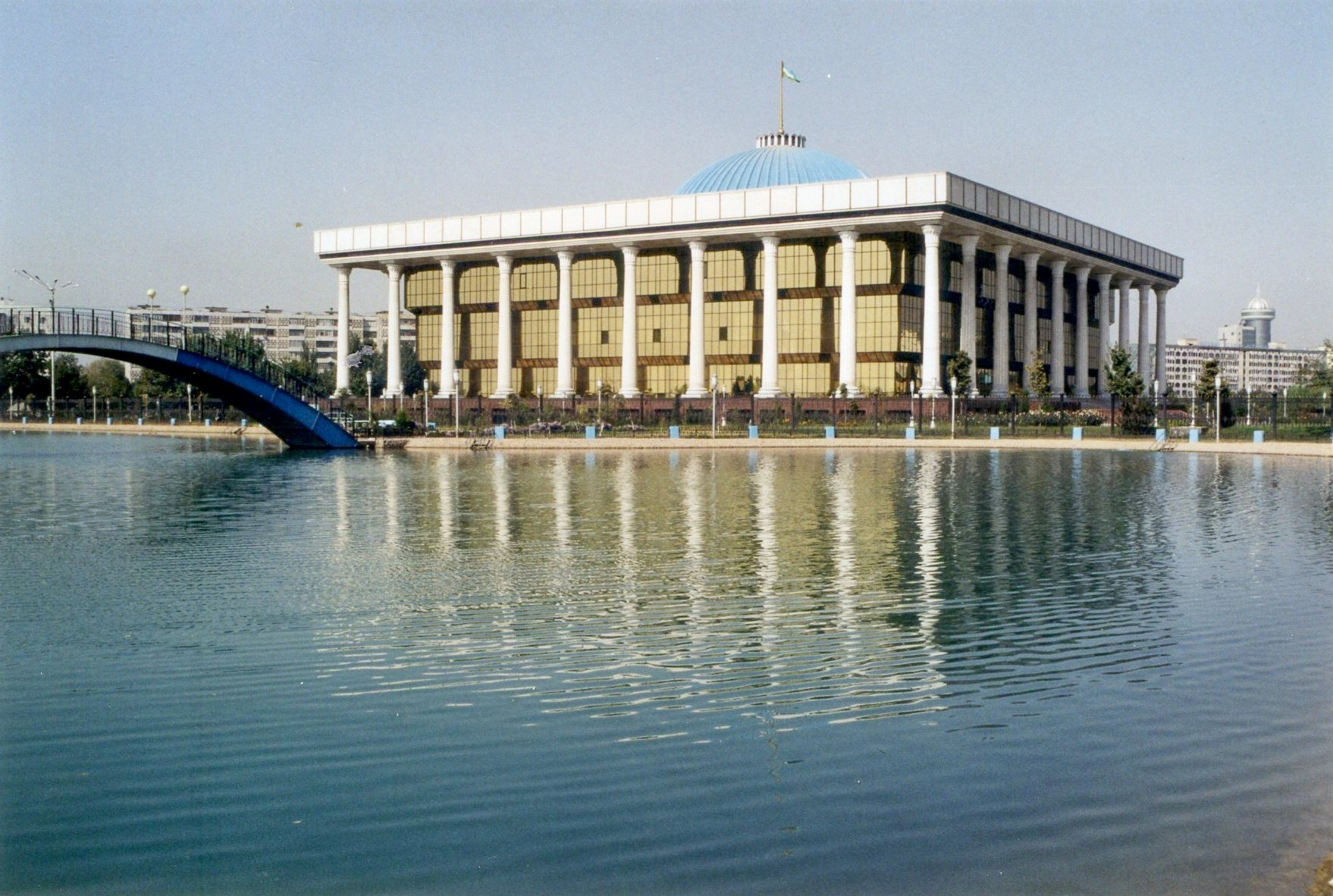
- Supreme Soviet Building, Tashkent, Uzbek SSR, Soviet Union

The Supreme Soviet of the Uzbek SSR (Uzbek: Ўзбекистон ССР Олий Совети, romanized: Oʻzbekiston SSR Oliy Soveti; Russian: Верховный Совет Узбекской ССР, romanized: Verkhovnyy Sovet Uzbekskoy SSR) was the highest organ of state authority of the Uzbek SSR from 1938 to 1991. The Supreme Soviet of the Uzbek SSR was preceded by the All-Uzbek Congress of Soviets which operated from 1925 to 1938. After the independence of Uzbekistan in 1991, the Supreme Soviet of the Uzbek SSR was briefly succeeded by the Supreme Council of the Republic of Uzbekistan from 1991 to 1994.

The 1990 Uzbek Supreme Soviet election was the first and final supreme soviet election that allowed for multiparty elections.

== History ==
The Supreme Soviet of the Uzbek SSR was established pursuant to constitutional reforms within the Uzbek SSR, which changed the organization of the main political organs of the republic. In theory, the Supreme Soviet had unlimited powers per unified power. However, in practice, its powers were curtailed by the Communist Party of Uzbekistan. When Uzbekistan achieved independence from the Soviet Union in 1991, the name of the Supreme Soviet of the Uzbek SSR was changed to the Supreme Council of the Republic of Uzbekistan. The Oliy Majlis replaced the Supreme Council of the Republic of Uzbekistan in February 1995.

== Convocations ==
Over the 53 years of its existence, the Supreme Soviet of the Uzbek SSR had a total of twelve convocations. The 12th and final convocation consisted of 500 deputies, which elected Islam Karimov as the President of the Uzbek SSR in 1990 and declared Uzbekistan's independence on August 31, 1991.

- 1st Convocation (1938–1946)
- 2nd Convocation (1947–1950)
- 3rd Convocation (1951–1954)
- 4th Convocation (1955–1959)
- 5th Convocation (1959–1962)
- 6th Convocation (1963–1966)
- 7th Convocation (1967–1970)
- 8th Convocation (1971–1974)
- 9th Convocation (1975–1979)
- 10th Convocation (1980–1984)
- 11th Convocation (1985–1989)
- 12th Convocation (1990–1991)

== Chairmen of the Supreme Soviet ==
No.	Picture	Name (Birth–Death)	Took office	Left office	Political party
Chairmen of the Supreme Soviet
1		Usman Yusupov (1901–1966)	17 July 1938	21 July 1938	CPSU
2		Abdurazak Mavlyanov (1908–1975)	_	_	CPSU
3		Nuritdin Mukhitdinov (1917–2008)	_	_	CPSU
4		Arif Khakimov (1912–1982)	1956	1958	CPSU
5		Rasul Gulamov (1911–?)	1959	30 May 1961	CPSU
6		Mirzamahmud Musakhanov (1912–1995)	30 May 1961	22 March 1963	CPSU
7		Abid Sadykov (1913–1987)	_	_	CPSU
8		Sagdy Sirzahdinov (1920–1989)	1967	1980	CPSU
9		Asadilla Khodjaev (1920–1983)	14 March 1980	6 September 1983	CPSU
10		Erkin Yusupov (1929–2003)	30 December 1983	30 March 1985	CPSU
11		Pulat Khabibullaev (1936–2010)	30 March 1985	9 April 1988	CPSU
12		Rasul Gulamov (1911–?)	9 April 1988	24 March 1990	CPSU
13		Mirzaolim Ibragimov (1928–2014)	_	_	CPSU
14		Shavkat Yuldashev (born 1943)	_	1991	CPSU

== Chairman of the Presidium of the Supreme Soviet ==
No.	Picture	Name (Birth–Death)	Took office	Left office	Political party
Chairmen of the Presidium of the Supreme Soviet
1		Yuldash Akhunbabaev (1885–1943)	21 July 1938	28 February 1943	CPSU
2		Abduvali Muminov (1902–1965)	22 March 1943	17 March 1947	CPSU
3		Amin Niyazov (1903–1973)	17 March 1947	21 August 1950	CPSU
4		Sharof Rashidov (1917–1983)	21 August 1950	24 March 1959	CPSU
5		Yodgor Nasriddinova (1920–2006)	24 March 1959	25 September 1970	CPSU
6		Nazar Matchanov (1923–2010)	25 September 1970	20 December 1978	CPSU
7		Inomjon Usmonxo‘jayev (1930–2017)	22 December 1978	20 December 1983	CPSU
8		Akil Salimov (1928–2014)	20 December 1983	9 December 1986	CPSU
9		Rafik Nishanov (1926–2023)	9 December 1986	9 April 1988	CPSU
10		Pulat Khabibullaev (1936–2010)	9 April 1988	6 March 1989	CPSU
11		Mirzaolim Ibragimov (1928–2014)	6 March 1989	24 March 1990	CPSU

== See also ==
- Supreme Soviet of the Soviet Union
- Supreme Soviet
- Uzbek SSR
