= Supreme Council =

Supreme Council may refer to:

== Culture ==
- Supreme Council of Antiquities, part of the Egyptian Ministry of Culture
- Supreme Council of Ethnic Hellenes, a non-profit organisation in Greece established in 1997

== Freemasonry ==
- Supreme Council, Scottish Rite (Southern Jurisdiction, USA)
- Supreme Council, Scottish Rite, Northern Jurisdiction, USA

== Religion ==
- Islamic Supreme Council of America, a Muslim religious organization in the United States
- Supreme Islamic Shia Council, Lebanese Shia high authority in Lebanon
- Supreme Muslim Council, the highest body in charge of Muslim community affairs in Palestine under British control
- Sangha Supreme Council, the governing body of the Buddhist order of Thailand

== Military ==
- Supreme Defence Council (Bahrain), Bahrain's highest defense authority
- Supreme War Council, a central command created by British Prime Minister David Lloyd George to coordinate Allied military strategy during World War I
- Supreme War Council (Japan), a council that was established during the development of representative government in Meiji period Japan

== Politics and government ==
=== Armenia ===
- Supreme Council of Armenia, the first National Parliament of Armenia in the post-Soviet era

=== Belarus ===
- Supreme Council of Belarus, the first National Parliament of Belarus in the post-Soviet era

=== Georgia ===
- Supreme Council of the Republic of Georgia, the first National Parliament of the Republic of Georgia in the post-Soviet era
- Supreme Council of the Autonomous Republic of Adjara, a local parliament in Adjara, Georgia

=== Iraq ===
- Islamic Supreme Council of Iraq, an Iraqi political party

=== Lebanon ===
- Supreme Council (Lebanon), a judicial body for trying certain impeachment cases

=== Kazakhstan ===
- Supreme Council of Kazakhstan, the first National Parliament of Kazakhstan in the post-Soviet era

=== Kyrgyzstan ===
- Supreme Council (Kyrgyzstan), the parliament of Kyrgyzstan

=== Latvia ===
- Supreme Council of Latvia, the first National Parliament of Latvia in the post-Soviet era

=== Lithuania ===
- Supreme Council of Lithuania, the first National Parliament of Lithuania in the post-Soviet era

=== Moldova ===
- Supreme Council (Transnistria), the parliament of Transnistria

=== Poland ===
- Supreme National Council, the central civil government of Poland loyal to the Kościuszko Insurrection, created 1794

=== Romania ===
- Supreme Council of National Defence (Romania), the autonomous administrative authority in Romania

=== Siam ===
- Supreme Council of State of Siam (now defunct), a body of advisors to King Prajadhipok of Siam from 1925 to 1932

=== Russia and the Soviet Union ===
- Supreme Privy Council, a body of advisors to Catherine I
- Supreme Soviet of the Soviet Union, the national legislature of the former Soviet Union
- Supreme Soviet of Russia, former national legislature of Russia (1938–1993)

=== South Korea ===
- Supreme Council for National Reconstruction, a military junta 1961–1963

=== Transnistria ===
- Supreme Council (Transnistria), the legislature of Transnistria

=== Ukraine and Crimea ===
- Verkhovna Rada, Supreme Council of Ukraine, the parliament of Ukraine
- Verkhovna Rada of Crimea, Supreme Council of Crimea, the parliament of the Autonomous Republic of Crimea, Ukraine
- Ukrainian Supreme Liberation Council, a Ukrainian political organisation formed in July 1944
- Supreme Ruthenian Council

=== United States ===
- Supreme Executive Council of the Commonwealth of Pennsylvania, a council of the Pennsylvania State government prior to the adoption of the 1790 constitution

=== United Arab Emirates ===
- Federal Supreme Council of the United Arab Emirates

=== Uzbekistan ===
- Supreme Council of Uzbekistan, the first National Parliament of Uzbekistan in the post-Soviet era
- Supreme Council of Karakalpakstan, the parliament of the Republic of Karakalpakstan

=== Yemen ===
- Supreme Political Council, an executive body formed by Houthi Ansarullah and the General People's Congress to rule Yemen

== Other uses ==
- Supreme Council for Women, Bahrain's advisory body to the government on women's issues
- Supreme Council of ICT of Iran, the main council in Iran for ICT affairs
- Supreme National Security Council, the National Security Council of the Islamic Republic of Iran
- Supreme Economic Council, established at the Paris Peace Conference in February 1919
- Supreme Petroleum Council

== See also ==
- Supreme Electoral Council (disambiguation)
- Supreme Military Council (disambiguation)
- Supreme People's Council (disambiguation)
- Revolutionary Council (disambiguation)
- Soviet (disambiguation)
- Supreme Soviet
- The Big Four (World War I), the four top Allied powers of the World War I, also known as the Council of Four
