= Supreme Council of Uzbekistan =

Legislature of Uzbekistan (1991–1994)

Supreme Council of the Republic of Uzbekistan O'zbekiston Respublikasi Oliy Kengashi (Uzbek)
- Uzbekistan (1991–1994)
- Emblem of Uzbekistan

Type
- Type: Unicameral

History
- Established: 31 August 1991
- Disbanded: 25 December 1994
- Preceded by: Supreme Soviet of the Uzbek SSR
- Succeeded by: Oliy Majlis

Leadership
- Chairman: Yuldashev, Shavkat Mukhitdinovich (only officeholder)
- Chairman of the Credentials Committee: Mirziyoyev, Shavkat Miramonovich (only officeholder)

Structure
- Seats: 500 (1991); 250 (1994–1995)
- Political groups: Communist Party of Uzbekistan (456); Unity (40); Independents (4)
- Political groups: Local Council nominees (167); People's Democratic Party of Uzbekistan (69); Progress of the Fatherland Party (14)

Elections
- Voting system: Mixed system
- First election: 18 February 1990
- Last election: 25 December 1994, 8 January and 22 January 1995

Meeting place
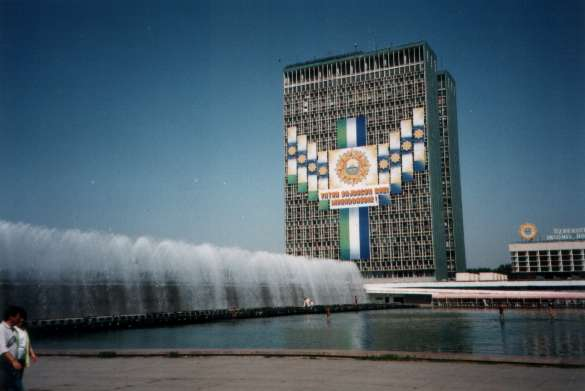
- Supreme Council Building, Tashkent, Uzbekistan

The Supreme Council of the Republic of Uzbekistan (Uzbek: O'zbekiston Jumhuriyatining Oliy Kengashi) was the supreme legislative and representative body of the state power from 31 August 1991, following the independence of the Republic of Uzbekistan.

== History ==
Like its predecessor, the Supreme Soviet of Soviet Uzbekistan was unicameral and consisted of 500 people's deputies of various nationalities elected from all regions of the republic. It is known as the parliament that declared the independence of Uzbekistan on August 31, 1991 (last, 12th convocation). It is also known in Uzbek history as an important state body in the first years after the establishment of independence and the acquisition of the republic.

The legislative elections of the Supreme Council were held in the year of 1990, 18 February. After the end of term of Supreme Council, the first parliamentary elections in the history of independent Uzbekistan were held, and a new national parliament – the Oliy Majlis (Supreme Assembly) of the Republic of Uzbekistan – a unicameral parliament (it became bicameral after the 2002 constitutional referendum) was established. In 1994, the new legislature included 250 people's deputies.

The Supreme Council had only one officeholder of its leadership – Yuldashev, Shavkat Mukhitdinovich, the only Chairman of the Supreme Council and Former Chairman of the Supreme Soviet of Uzbek SSR.

In 1991, its accountabilities were:

1. passing and initiating laws (not to be confused with decrees);
2. submitting questions to the president, the cabinet council, scheduling the elections of people's deputies;
3. implement confirmation hearings of nominated cabinet members - ministers, presiding officers of state committees and autonomous authorities under the cabinet;
4. ratifying the composition of the cabinet and changes in it on the submission on the chairman;
5. forming and disbanding ministries and state committees on the cabinet's official proposal;
6. overriding a presidential veto with a two-thirds majority.
7. impeaching president;
8. ratifying presidential proposed declarations of war in the case of when state's been deliberately assaulted;
9. hearing reports by organs of appointed officials;
10. submitting for ratification (and ratifying and amending) by the mandate commission long-term national and social and economic development plans, the national budget, monitoring implantation of the state plan and budget, and ratifying reports on their performance;
11. ratifying international treaties;
12. overseeing the granting of foreign aid and negotiating foreign loans;
13. determining basic measures for national security, including declarations of war, mobilizing troops, and meeting international treaty obligations;

== Structure ==
=== Presidium ===
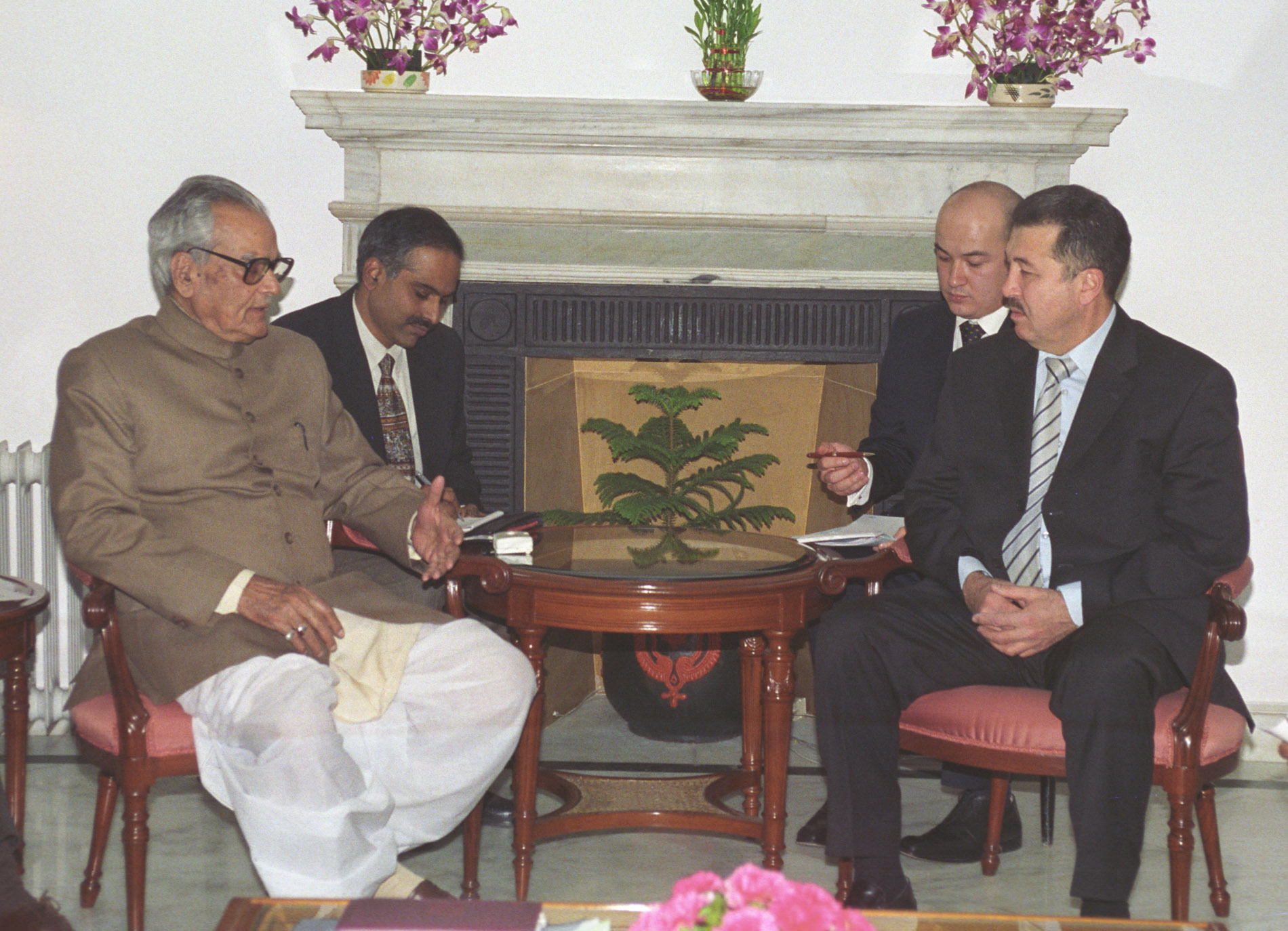
The last Chairman of the Presidium, Khalilov, Erkin Khamdamovich (in the right), before the transition to the Oliy Majlis.

The Presidium of the Supreme Council of Uzbekistan (Uzbek: Oliy Kengash Rayosati) was a permanent body attached to the republic’s highest legislative body. It functioned as both a consultative and executive organ, ensuring continuity of state power between the sessions of the Supreme Council. From the Soviet period until its dissolution in 1995, the Presidium played a central role in the legal, political, and representative life of Uzbekistan.

Under the Uzbek SSR, the Supreme Soviet was the highest legislative body. Its Presidium acted as a collective head of state, supervising governance between sessions.

Its powers and accountabilities were:

1. promulgation of decrees;
1. representation of the Supreme Council (between its sessions) in its relationships with parliaments of foreign countries;
2. ensured implementation of the decrees and resolutions made by council;
3. prepared draft laws and decrees;
4. supervised local councils;
5. decided matters of citizenship;
6. ensured conformity of decrees and decisions across the republic;
7. establishing the plenums of the council;
8. receiving of Letters of Credence and Letters of Recall from foreign diplomatic representatives, accredited in the state;
9. relieving the vice president of his job and appointing cabinet members - ministers, presiding officials of the state committees and other autonomous authorities under the cabinet (between sessions of the council) with the subsequent submittal for the president's and parliament's approval;
10. abrogation of decrees issued by the cabinet council in the case there is a discrepancy;

With the consolidation of the institution of the President of the Republic of Uzbekistan, many of the Presidium’s earlier competencies were transferred to the presidential office. The adoption of the 1992 Constitution formalized this change, and by 1995 the Presidium was entirely dissolved with the establishment of the Oliy Majlis, a professional and permanent parliament.

=== Credentials Committee ===
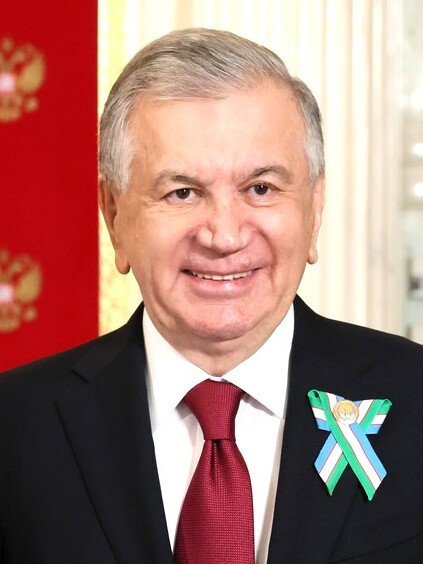
The Chairman of the Credentials Committee 1991-1994, Shavkat Mirziyoyev

In accordance with Article 111 of the Constitution of the Republic of Uzbekistan, the Supreme Council of the Republic of Uzbekistan works on the preparation of draft laws, for preliminary consideration and preparation of issues under the jurisdiction of the Supreme Council Following Uzbekistan, laws of the Republic of Uzbekistan, Uzbekistan In order to assist in the implementation of other decisions of the Supreme Council of the Republic by state and public agencies and organizations and to supervise this work, the Credentials Committee and other committees are elected from among the deputies to cooperate with the local Soviets of People's Deputies and their standing commissions.

The Credentials Committee also known as Mandate Commission of the Supreme Council of the Republic of Uzbekistan should fulfil the tasks assigned to them and help the Supreme Council of the Republic of Uzbekistan, which is the highest office of the state power of the Republic of Uzbekistan, to function effectively. The Committee operated in cooperation with the Central Electoral Commission.

The Mandate Commission and committees of the Supreme Council used to organize their work in accordance with their plans, instructions and recommendations of the Supreme Council, its Presidium and deputies. Shortly, Mandate Commission could've only acted under instructions of legislature.

The main tasks of the Mandate Commission or officially functioned as Credentials Committee of the Supreme Council of the Republic of Uzbekistan are as follows:

1. verification of authority;
2. examination of documents;
3. to ensure that delegates - deputies are properly elected and authorized to represent their respective electoral districts.
4. development, to be specific, amendment of projects of laws and other decisions of the council;
5. reporting findings to the presidium;
6. interpretation of current state laws in the republic;
7. dissolution of the legislature and scheduling new elections: implementing a state referendum on its own, or the president's initiative, or at the request of the council;
8. preliminary review and preparation of issues under the jurisdiction of the council;
9. ratification and denunciation of international treaties, signed by the state;
10. realisation of the right to pardon;
11. establishment of orders and medals with the official request of the president;
12. establishment of military or diplomatic ranks or other special ranks with only the official request of the president;
13. declaration of states of war or defence, only in the case of an assault on the sovereign territories of the state;

The Chairman of the Supreme Council of the Republic of Uzbekistan, his deputies, and the Prosecutor of the state couldn't be elected to the Mandate Commission and committees.

The People's Deputy of the Republic of Uzbekistan, who was recommended to be elected to the Mandate Commission or Committee of the Supreme Council of the Republic of Uzbekistan, could speak at the session of the Supreme Council of the Republic of Uzbekistan and explain his activity program. He answered the questions of the participants of the session.

=== Committee of Constitutional Supervision ===
The Committee on Constitutional Supervision was a permanent parliamentary body of the Supreme Council, created to safeguard the supremacy of the Constitution and ensure that laws, decrees, and government actions complied with constitutional norms.

The Committee of Constitutional Supervision (CCS) was a brief, late-Soviet body established in 1989 to review the constitutionality of laws and legal acts, operating from mid-1990 to the end of 1991. Elected by the Congress of People's Deputies and composed of legal and political science experts, the CCS was empowered to make decisions on the conformity of legislation and normative acts with the USSR Constitution and laws. Its existence was cut short by the collapse of the Soviet Union in 1991, but it represented a significant, albeit short-lived, attempt to introduce judicial review in the USSR.

CSS stopped to exist after the collapse, however Uzbekistan kept its CCS until the December 8, 1992 transferring its functions to the Constitutional Court of Uzbekistan with the introduction of the Constitution of Uzbekistan.

Initially planned for 23 members, the committee was ultimately larger. It was elected by the Supreme Council of the Republic.

The CCS was created following legislative amendments to the Constitution of the USSR in December 1988 and the adoption of the Law on Constitutional Control in the USSR in December 1989.

Its mandates were:

1. The committee's mandate was to oversee the constitutionality of draft laws, enacted laws of the USSR, legislative acts of the Supreme Soviet, decrees of the Prosecutor-General and Supreme State Arbiter, and other normative acts. From its commencement in mid-1990 until its dissolution, the CCS issued a number of decisions, making it a unique development in the history of constitutional review within the Uzbek SSR.
2. Examined draft laws and existing legislation to ensure conformity with the Constitution of Uzbekistan.
3. Had the right to propose amendments or recommend the rejection of unconstitutional acts.
