= Supreme Assembly =

Supreme Assembly may refer to:

- Supreme Assembly (Nakhchivan)
- Supreme Assembly (Tajikistan)

== See also ==
- Supreme Council (disambiguation)
