= Usman Yusupov =

Soviet Uzbek politician

- Usmon Yusupov (Uzbek); Усман Юсупов (Russian)
- Yusupov in 1937

Chairman of the Council of Ministers of the Uzbek SSR
- In office 7 April 1953 – 18 December 1954
- Preceded by: Nuritdin Mukhitdinov
- Succeeded by: Nuritdin Mukhitdinov

Minister of Cotton Production of the USSR
- In office 5 April 1950 – 15 March 1953
- Preceded by: Office established
- Succeeded by: Office abolished

Chairman of the Supreme Soviet of the Uzbek SSR
- In office 17 July 1938 – 21 July 1938
- Preceded by: Office established
- Succeeded by: Yuldash Akhunbabaev (as Chairman of the Presidium)

First Secretary of the Communist Party of Uzbekistan
- In office 27 September 1937 – 7 April 1950
- Preceded by: Akmal Ikramov
- Succeeded by: Amin Niyazov

People's Commissar of the Food Industry of the Uzbek SSR
- In office December 1936 – September 1937

Personal details
- Born: 1 March 1901 Kaftarkhan, Margelan District, Fergana Oblast, Russian Empire
- Died: 7 May 1966 (aged 65) Yangiyo'l, Tashkent Oblast, Uzbek SSR, Soviet Union
- Citizenship: Soviet Union; Russian Empire (previously)
- Party: CPSU
- Awards: Order of Lenin Order of the Patriotic War (1st class) Order of the Red Banner of Labour Order of the Badge of Honour

Usman Yusupovich Yusupov (Uzbek: Usmon Yusupovich Yusupov; Russian: Усман Юсупович Юсупов; 1 March 1901 – 7 May 1966) was a Soviet Uzbek politician who was the de facto head of state of the Uzbek Soviet Socialist Republic from 1937 to 1950 as the First Secretary of the Communist Party of Uzbekistan.

== Early life and education ==
Yusupov was born in the village of Kaftarkhan in the Russian Empire on March 1, 1901. Born into a family of an Uzbek laborer, he too began working at a ginnery in Kovunch at the age of fifteen.

== Political career ==
Usman Yusupov joined the All-Union Communist Party (Bolsheviks) in 1926.

From 1926 to 1928, he served as the chairman of the Tashkent District Committee of the Builders' Union. He then became the Head of the Organizational Department of the Tashkent District Committee of the Communist Party of Uzbekistan and served in the position from 1928 to 1929. From March 1929 to September 1931, he was the Secretary of the Central Committee of the Communist Party of Uzbekistan in the city of Samarkand. From September 1931 to December 1934, Yusupov served as the chairman of the Central Asian Bureau of the All-Union Trade Union Confederation in Tashkent. From November 1936 to September 1937, Yusupov served as the People's Commissar of the Food Industry of the Uzbek SSR. He briefly served as the chairman of the Supreme Soviet of the Uzbek SSR for five days.

Yusupov then served as the de facto head of state of the Uzbek SSR as the First Secretary of the Communist Party of Uzbekistan from 1937 to 1950. He also served as the First Secretary of the Tashkent Regional Committee of the Communist Party of Uzbekistan from 1938 to 1943. He served as the Minister of Cotton Production of the Soviet Union from 1950 to 1953, and then served as the fourth Chairman of the Council of Ministers of the Uzbek SSR from 1953 to 1954. He worked as a director of state farm until 1959 when he retired.

== Death ==
Usman Yusupov died on May 7, 1966, in the city of Yangiyo'l. He was buried at the Chigatai Cemetery located in Tashkent.

== Awards ==
- Order of Lenin (six times)
- Order of the Patriotic War 1st Class
- Order of the Red Banner of Labour (22 December 1939)
- Order of the Badge of Honour

== See also ==
- Communist Party of Uzbekistan
- Uzbek Soviet Socialist Republic
