= Rafiq Nishonov =

Soviet Uzbek politician (1926–2023)

- Рафиқ Нишонов

Chairman of the Soviet of Nationalities of the Supreme Soviet of the Soviet Union
- In office 6 June 1989 – 5 September 1991
- Preceded by: Augusts Voss
- Succeeded by: Anuarbek Alimzhanov (as chairman of the Soviet of Republics)

12th First Secretary of the Communist Party of Uzbek SSR
- In office 12 January 1988 – 23 June 1989
- Preceded by: Inomjon Usmonxoʻjayev
- Succeeded by: Islam Karimov

Chairman of the Presidium of the Supreme Soviet of the Uzbek SSR
- In office 9 December 1986 – 9 April 1988
- Preceded by: Akil Salimov
- Succeeded by: Poʻlat Habibullayev

Personal details
- Born: 15 January 1926 Gʻazalkent, Uzbek SSR, Soviet Union (now Uzbekistan)
- Died: 11 January 2023 (aged 96) Geneva, Switzerland
- Party: CPSU (1949–1991)

Rafiq Nishonovich Nishonov (Cyrillic Uzbek: Рафиқ Нишонович Нишонов; Russian: Рафик Нишанович Нишанов Rafik Nishanovich Nishanov; 15 January 1926 – 11 January 2023) was the thirteenth First Secretary of the Communist Party of the Uzbek SSR. Nishonov held this position for 17 months, from 12 January 1988 to 23 June 1989. His replacement was Islam Karimov. Prior to that, he also served as the Chairman of the Presidium of the Supreme Soviet of the Uzbek SSR between 1986 and 1988. He was also Chairman of the Soviet of Nationalities from 1989 to 1991.

== Early life and career ==
Rafik Nishanov was born on January 15, 1926, in Gazalkent in the family of a farm laborer. Rafik Nishanov's grandfather was from Shakhrisabz. Since 1942, he has been a collective farmer at the Chirchik collective farm in the Boʻstonliq District of the Tashkent Oblast. In 1943, he became secretary of the executive committee of the Gazalkent village council. From 1945 to 1950 he served in the Soviet Army. In 1949 he joined the Communist Party of the Soviet Union.

In 1950, he worked as the head of the department of the Oktyabrsky district committee of the Komsomol of Uzbekistan in the city of Tashkent. In 1956, he became the head of one of the departments of the Tashkent City Committee of the Communist Party of Uzbekistan. In 1959, he graduated from the Tashkent Evening Pedagogical Institute with a degree in history teacher. In 1969 he received a Candidate of Historical Sciences degree. In 1962, he became Chairman of the Tashkent City Executive Committee.

== Diplomatic career ==
From 1970 to 1978, he served as Ambassador Extraordinary and Plenipotentiary to Sri Lanka and the Maldives. Sergey Lavrov, who has since 2004 served as the Foreign Minister of Russia, served as his Sinhala interpreter. Since 1978, he was Ambassador Extraordinary and Plenipotentiary of the USSR to Jordan. In 1985, Rafik Nishanov returned to his homeland, where he served as Minister of Foreign Affairs of the Uzbek SSR .

== Leader of the Uzbek SSR ==
Like many other leaders in the Uzbek SSR, he strongly opposed allowing Crimean Tatars the right of return and rebuked them for wanting to return to Crimea, even saying that Crimean Tatars who want to leave the Uzbek SSR should find "their place" in faraway Kazan.

== Career in Moscow ==
On June 6, 1989, he was elected chairman of the Council of Nationalities of the Supreme Soviet of the USSR. He was a People's Deputy of the USSR from 1989-1991. In September 1991, he became an advisor to Soviet President Mikhail Gorbachev.

== Later life ==
He retired in November 1991, living in Moscow. In 2012, he published a book of memoirs, “Trees Turn Green Before Snowstorms”. In 2013, he was elected to the Council of the Association of Russian Diplomats. Nishonov died on 11 January 2023, 4 days before his 97th birthday. He was buried in the Muslim Cemetery of Geneva next to his wife.

== Personal life ==
His wife Rano Nazarovna was a deputy minister of culture of the Uzbek SSR. His son Sabir was an officer in the Soviet and later Uzbek army. Then - head of AF Telecom Holding LLC. His daughter is a teacher.

== Awards ==
- Honorary title "Honored Worker of Culture of the Uzbek SSR" (14 January 1986)
- Two Order of the Red Banner of Labour
- Two Order of the Badge of Honour (1 March 1965 and 15 January 1976)
- Gratitude of the Government of the Russian Federation (14 January 2011)
- Order of Honor (22 December 2015)
- Order of Alexander Nevsky (15 January 2021)

Party political offices
| Preceded by Inomjon Usmonxo‘jayev | First Secretary of the Communist Party of the Uzbek SSR; 1988–1989 | Succeeded by Islam Karimov |
| Preceded by Augusts Voss | Chairman of the Soviet of Nationalities; 6 June 1989 – 5 September 1991 | Succeeded by Anuarbek Alimzhanov |
