= Supreme Soviet =

Legislatures of the constituent republics of the Soviet Union

Badge of the Supreme Soviet

The Supreme Soviet (Russian: Верховный Совет, romanized: Verkhovny Sovet, lit. 'Supreme Council') was the common name for the highest organs of state authority of the Soviet socialist republics (SSR) in the Union of Soviet Socialist Republics (USSR). These soviets were modeled after the Supreme Soviet of the USSR, established in 1938, and were nearly identical.

Party-approved delegates to the Supreme Soviets were periodically elected unopposed in show elections. The first free or semi-free elections took place during perestroika in late 1980s, in which Supreme Soviets themselves were no longer directly elected. Instead, Supreme Soviets were appointed by directly elected Congresses of People's Deputies based somewhat on the Congresses of Soviets that preceded the Supreme Soviets. The soviets until then were largely rubber-stamp institutions, approving decisions handed to them by the Communist Party of the USSR or of each SSR.

The soviets met infrequently (often only twice a year for only several days) and elected the Presidium of the Supreme Soviet, a permanent body, to act on their behalf while the soviet was not in session. The presidiums were also empowered to issue decrees in lieu of law. If such decrees were not ratified by the Supreme Soviet at its next session, they were to be considered revoked. In practice, the principles of democratic centralism meant this power of veto was almost never exercised, meaning that Presidium decrees de facto had the force of law.

Under the 1936 and 1977 Soviet Constitutions, the Presidium of a Supreme Soviet served as the collective head of state of its republic. The Supreme Soviets also elected Councils of Ministers (Councils of People's Commissars before 1946), which were executive bodies.

After the dissolution of the USSR in late December 1991, the soviets transformed into liberal democratic legislatures of independent countries until Armenia, Azerbaijan, Kazakhstan and Uzbekistan abandoned the system in 1995.

== Supreme Soviets of the Union Republics ==
Soviet Republics dissolved before the dissolution of the Soviet Union Parliaments not formally recognized by some countries such as the Western Bloc

Emblem	Soviet Republic	Supreme Soviet	Established	Disbanded	Succeeded by
	(Russian Soviet Federative Socialist Republic) /Russia	Supreme Soviet of Russia; Congress of People's Deputies of Russia Верховный Совет РСФСР (Российской Федерации); Съезд народных депутатов РСФСР (Российской Федерации)	1938 (Supreme Soviet of Russia); 1990 (Congress of People's Deputies of Russia)	1993	(Russia) Constitutional Conference (1993) (Russia) Federal Assembly (1993–present): • Federation Council • State Duma
	Ukraine	Supreme Soviet of the Ukrainian SSR Верховный Совет Украинской ССР; Верховна Рада Української РСР	1937	1991 (De facto); 1996 (De jure)	(Ukraine) / (Ukraine) Verkhovna Rada
	Byelorussia	Supreme Soviet of the Byelorussian SSR Верховный Совет Белорусской ССР; Вярхоўны Савет Беларускай ССР	1938	1991 (De facto); 1994 (De jure)	(Belarus) / (Belarus) Supreme Council (1994–96) (Belarus) / (Belarus) National Assembly (1996–present)
	Uzbekistan	Supreme Soviet of the Uzbek SSR Верховный Совет Узбекской ССР; Ўзбекистон ССР Олий Совети	1938	1991	(Uzbekistan) Supreme Council (1991–1995) (Uzbekistan) Oliy Majlis (1995–present)
	Kazakhstan	Supreme Soviet of the Kazakh SSR Верховный Совет Казахской ССР; Қазақ ССР Жоғарғы Советі	1937	1993	(Kazakhstan) Supreme Council (1993–95) (Kazakhstan) Parliament (1995–present)
	Georgia	Supreme Soviet of the Georgian SSR Верховный Совет Грузинской ССР საქართველოს სსრ უმაღლესი საბჭო	1938	1990	(Georgia (country)) Supreme Council (1990–1992) (Georgia (country)) Military Council/State Council (1992–1995) (Georgia (country)) / (Georgia (country)) Parliament (1995–present)
	(Azerbaijan Soviet Socialist Republic) /Azerbaijan	Supreme Soviet of Azerbaijan Верховный Совет Азербайджа́нской ССР (Азербайджанской Республики); Азәрбаjҹан ССР Али Совети; Azərbaycan Respublikasının Ali Soveti	1938	1995	(Azerbaijan) / (Azerbaijan) National Assembly
	Lithuania	Supreme Soviet of the Lithuanian SSR Верховный Совет Литовской ССР; Lietuvos TSR Aukščiausioji Taryba	1940	1990	(Lithuania) Supreme Council (1990–1992) (Lithuania) Seimas (1992–present)
	Moldavia	Supreme Soviet of the Moldavian SSR Верховный Совет Молдавской ССР; Совиетул Супрем ал РСС Молдовеняскэ (Moldovan); Sovietul Suprem al RSS Moldovenească (Romanian)	1941	1993	(Moldova) Parliament
	Latvia	Supreme Soviet of the Latvian SSR Верховный Совет Латвийской ССР; Latvijas PSR Augstākā Padome	1940	1990	(Latvia) Supreme Council (1990–1993) (Latvia) Saeima (1993–present)
	Kirghizia	Supreme Soviet of the Kirghiz SSR Верховный Совет Киргизской ССР; Кыргыз ССР Жогорку Совети	1938	1994	(Kyrgyzstan) / (Kyrgyzstan) Supreme Council
	Tajikistan	Supreme Soviet of the Tajik SSR Верховный Совет Таджикской ССР; Совети Олӣ РСС Тоҷикистон	1937	1994	(Tajikistan) Supreme Assembly
	(Armenian Soviet Socialist Republic) /Armenia	Supreme Soviet of Armenia Верховный Совет Армянской ССР (Республики Армения); Հայկական ՍՍՀ (Հայաստանի Հանրապետության) Գերագույն Խորհուրդ	1938	1995	(Armenia) National Assembly
	Turkmenistan	Supreme Soviet of the Turkmen SSR Верховный Совет Туркменской ССР; Түркменистан ССР Ёкары Советы	1938	1992	(Turkmenistan) / (Turkmenistan) / (Turkmenistan) Assembly (1992–2021, 2023–present) (Turkmenistan) National Council (2021–2023)
	Estonia	Supreme Soviet of the Estonian SSR Верховный Совет Эстонской ССР; Eesti NSV Ülemnõukogu	1940	1992	(Estonia) Riigikogu
	Karelo-Finnish SSR	Supreme Soviet of the Karelo-Finnish Soviet Socialist Republic	1940	1956	(Republic of Karelia) Supreme Soviet

== Supreme Soviets of the Autonomous Republics ==
Emblem	Autonomous Republic	Supreme Soviet	Established	Disbanded	Succeeded by
	Bashkiria	Supreme Soviet of the Bashkir ASSR Верховный Совет Башкирской АССР; Башҡорт АССР-ы Юғары Советы	1938	1995	(Russia) (Bashkortostan) / (Russia) (Bashkortostan) State Assembly
	Buryatia	Supreme Soviet of the Buryat ASSR Верховный Совет Бурятской АССР; Буряадай АССР-эй Верховно Совет	1938	1994	(Russia) (Buryatia) People's Khural
	Dagestan	Supreme Soviet of the Dagestan ASSR; Congress of People's Deputies of the Dagestan ASSR Верховный Совет Дагестанской АССР; Съезд народных депутатов Дагестанской АССР	1938	1994	(Russia) (Dagestan) / (Russia) (Dagestan) People's Assembly
	Kalmykia	Supreme Soviet of the Kalmyk ASSR Верховный Совет Калмыцкой АССР; Хальмг АССР-ин Деед Совет	1938; 1958	1943; 1994	(Russia) (Kalmykia) / (Russia) (Kalmykia) People's Khural
	Karelia	Supreme Soviet of the Karelian ASSR Верховный Совет Карельской АССР; Karjalan ASNT:n Korkein Neuvosto	1938; 1956	1940; 1994	(Russia) (Republic of Karelia) Legislative Assembly
	Komi	Supreme Soviet of the Komi ASSR Верховный Совет Коми АССР; Коми АССР-са Верховнӧй Сӧвет	1938	1994	(Russia) (Komi Republic) / (Russia) (Komi Republic) State Council
	Mari	Supreme Soviet of the Mari ASSR Верховный Совет Марийской АССР; Марий АССР Верховный Совет	1938	1994	(Russia) (Mari El) / (Russia) (Mari El) State Assembly
	Mordovia	Supreme Soviet of the Mordovian ASSR Верховный Совет Мордовской АССР; Мордовскяй АССР-нь Верховнай Совет; Мордовской АССР-нь Верховной Совет	1938	1995	(Russia) (Mordovia) / (Russia) (Mordovia) State Assembly
	North Ossetia	Supreme Soviet of the North Ossetian ASSR Верховный Совет Северо-Осетинской АССР; Цӕгат Ирыстоны ACCP-Йы Сӕйраг Совет	1938	1994	(Russia) (North Ossetia–Alania) / (Russia) (North Ossetia–Alania) Parliament
	Tatarstan	Supreme Soviet of the Tatar ASSR Верховный Совет Татарской АССР; Татарстан АССР Югары Советы	1938	1995	(Russia) (Tatarstan) State Council
	Tuva	Supreme Soviet of the Tuvan ASSR Верховный Совет Тувинской АССР; Тыва АССР-ниң Дээди Соведи	1962	1993	(Russia) (Tuva) / (Russia) (Tuva) Great Khural
	Udmurtia	Supreme Soviet of the Udmurt ASSR Верховный Совет Удмуртской АССР; Удмурт АССР-лэн Верховной Советэз	1938	1994	(Russia) (Udmurtia) State Council
	Checheno-Ingushetia	Supreme Soviet of the Checheno-Ingush ASSR Верховный Совет Чечено-Ингушской АССР	1938; 1957	1944; 1991	(Chechen Republic of Ichkeria) Parliament of the Chechen; Republic of Ichkeria (1991–2000) (Russia) (Chechnya) Parliament of the Chechen Republic (2003–present) (Russia) / (Russia) People's Assembly of the Republic of Ingushetia (1994–present)
	Chuvashia	Supreme Soviet of the Chuvash ASSR Верховный Совет Чувашской АССР; Чӑваш АССР Верховнӑй Совечӗ	1938	1994	(Russia) (Chuvashia) State Council
	Yakutia	Supreme Soviet of the Yakut ASSR Верховный Совет Якутской АССР; Саха АССР Верховнай Совета	1938	1993	(Russia) (Sakha Republic) State Assembly
	Karakalpakstan	Supreme Soviet of the Karakalpak ASSR Верховный Совет Каракалпакской АССР; Қорақалпоғистон АССР Олий Совети; Қарақалпақстан АССР Жоқарғы Совети	1938	1994	(Uzbekistan) (Karakalpakstan) Supreme Council
	Abkhazia	Supreme Soviet of the Abkhaz ASSR Верховный Совет Абхазской АССР აფხაზეთის ასსრ უმაღლესი საბჭო Аҧснытәи АССР Иреиҳаӡоу Асовет	1938	1996	(Abkhazia) People's Assembly
	Adjara	Supreme Soviet of the Adjarian ASSR Верховный Совет Аджарской АССР აჭარის ასსრ უმაღლესი საბჭო	1938	1991	(Georgia (country)) (Adjara) / (Georgia (country)) (Adjara) Supreme Council
	Nakhichevan	Supreme Soviet of the Nakhichevan ASSR Верховный Совет Нахичеванской АССР; Нахчыван МССР Али Совети	1938	1990	(Azerbaijan) / (Azerbaijan) Supreme Assembly (Nakhchivan)

== See also ==
- Supreme Council (disambiguation)
- Soviet (disambiguation)
