= Kuprian Kirkizh =

Belarusian revolutionary and Soviet statesman

- Куприян Киркиж
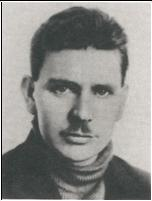

First Secretary of the Communist Party of Uzbekistan
- In office 1927 – April 1929
- Preceded by: Vladimir Ivanov
- Succeeded by: Nikolai Gikalo

Executive secretary of the Kharkiv Regional Committee
- In office 1922 – November 1925
- Preceded by: Nikolay Popov
- Succeeded by: Pavel Postyshev

Personal details
- Born: 29 October 1886 Smolyany, Lepelsky Uyezd, Vitebsk Governorate, Russian Empire (now Belarus)
- Died: 24 May 1932 (aged 45) Vladimir, Vladimir Oblast, Russian SFSR, Soviet Union
- Resting place: Kremlin Wall Necropolis, Moscow
- Party: RSDLP (Bolsheviks) (1910–1918); All-Union Communist Party (Bolsheviks) (1918–1932)
- Awards: Order of the Red Banner

Kuprian Osipovich Kirkizh (Russian: Куприян Осипович Киркиж; 29 September 1886 – 24 May 1932) was a Belarusian revolutionary and Soviet statesman who served as the second General Secretary of the Communist Party of the Uzbek SSR from 1927 until April 1929.

== Biography ==
Born into a peasant family, he became a worker at a paper mill in Vitebsk province in 1901. Then he moved to Riga and went to work at the Eduard Bruns & Co paper mill.

Kirkizh joined the Bolshevik faction of the RSDLP in 1910. He was initially a member of the Vitebsk Committee of the RSDLP (b) and he was active in underground party work in Riga. During the First World War he was active in the city of Kharkiv.

He was an active participant in the October Revolution and the Civil War in Ukraine. Kirkizh was chairman of the Petinsky district committee of the RSDLP (b) in Kharkiv, a member of the Kharkov committee of the RSDLP (b), a member of the Kharkiv Council and the provincial committee of the RSDLP (b). In 1918 he was Chairman of the Collegium of the Artillery Plant (Moscow). He fought against the forces of Anton Denikin and Nestor Makhno.

After the Civil War, until 1922 he was deputy chairman of the executive committee of the Kharkiv Provincial Council of Deputies.

From 1922 to 1925 he was executive secretary of the Kharkiv Provincial Committee of the Communist Party of Byelorussia (b). In 1925 he worked as the head of the Organizational Department of the Central Committee of the CPB (b). From November 1925 to November 1926 he was executive secretary of the Kharkiv District Committee of the CPB (b).

From December 1925 to November 1926 he was secretary of the Communist Party of Byelorussia (b).

From November 1926 to February 1927 he was People's Commissar of the Workers 'and Peasants' Inspectorate of the USSR and Chairman of the Central Control Commission of the Communist Party of Ukraine.

From February 1927 to April 1929 he was the First Secretary of the Central Committee of the CP (B) of Uzbekistan and Deputy Chairman of the Central Asian Bureau of the Central Committee of the CPSU (B).

From April 1929 he was chairman of the Central Committee of the Union of Soviet Civil Servants, and from 1931 he was chairman of the Central Committee of the Union of Machine-Building Workers. From April 1929 to May 1932 he was a member of the Presidium of the All-Ukrainian Central Executive Committee.

After a visit to the Kovrov Tool Plant on May 21, 1932, Kirkizh's car crashed on the way back to Moscow and he as well as the other passengers were severely injured and were taken to a hospital in Vladimir for treatment. On May 23, Kirkizh died from the injuries. His ashes were buried in the Kremlin Wall Necropolis.

Preceded by Vladimir Ivanov	General Secretary of the Communist Party of the Uzbek SSR; 1927 – 1929	Succeeded by Nikolay Gikalo
