= 2004–05 Uzbek parliamentary election =

Parliamentary elections were held in Uzbekistan on 26 December 2004, with a second round on 9 January 2005. The Uzbekistan Liberal Democratic Party won the most seats.

== Elections ==
The 2004 elections were the first elections since the Oliy Majlis was made into a two-chamber parliament in the January 2002 referendum. The total seating in the new bicameral Oliy Majilis was reduced from 250 seats in the unicameral Oliy Majlis to 220 seats - 120 in the legislative chamber, elected in single-mandate constituencies, and 100 senators, of which 16 were appointed by the President of Uzbekistan. Elections for regional councils, district councils, and municipal councils were also held on the same date.

Five political parties were registered and fielded candidates for the legislative chamber: People's Democratic Party of Uzbekistan, Justice Social Democratic Party ("Adolat"), Milliy Tiklanish, Self-Sacrifice National Democratic Party and Uzbekistan Liberal Democratic Party. Four unregistered political parties were excluded from the 2004 elections: Ozod Dehkonlar (Free Peasants), Party of Agrarians and Entrepreneurs, Birlik ("Unity") and Erk Democratic Party ("Freedom").

== Results ==
Party	First round			Second round			Total seats	+/–
Party	Votes	%	Seats	Votes	%	Seats	Total seats	+/–
Uzbekistan Liberal Democratic Party			21			20	41	New
People's Democratic Party of Uzbekistan			18			10	28	–21
Self-Sacrifice National Democratic Party			9			9	18	–36
Uzbekistan National Revival Democratic Party			6			5	11	+1
Justice Social Democratic Party			2			8	10	–1
Independents			6			6	12	–4
Total			62			58	120	–130
Total votes	12,197,159	–						
Registered voters/turnout	14,332,736	85.10			50			
Source: IPU
