= Socialist Party of Kazakhstan =

Former political party in Kazakhstan

Socialist Party of Kazakhstan Қазақстан Социалистік партиясы
- Abbreviation: QSP
- First Chairman: Anuarbek Alimzhanov
- Last Chairman: Peter Svoik
- Founded: 7 September 1991 (34 years, 153 days)
- Dissolved: 5 April 2003 (22 years, 308 days)
- Preceded by: Communist Party of Kazakhstan

The Socialist Party of Kazakhstan (Kazakh: Қазақстанның социалистік партиясы, romanized: Qazaqstannyñ sotsialistık partiiasy, QSP) was a political party in Kazakhstan that existed from 1991 to 2003.

== History ==
The party was founded at the 18th Extraordinary Congress of the Communist Party on 7 September 1991 where the party voted to rename itself to Socialist Party. Anuar Alimzhanov was chosen to be the first chairman. The party became registered on 21 October 1991 and that same month, dissatisfied members over the party's reformation split off from the Socialist Party and reestablished the Communist Party of Kazakhstan.

The party's success came in the 1994 Kazakh legislative election, where it won 8 seats, however, over time, the Socialist Party began to lose support among the population. Its membership decreased from about 49,000 to just 35,000 by 1996. The party performed poorly in the 1995 Kazakh legislative election losing 7 seats, leaving it with just only one. The party was mainly based in the Almaty Region. Its last chairman was Peter Svoik who led the party from January 1996 until April 1996, when he was elected as the co-chair of Azamat Democratic Party.

After the adoption of the law "On Public Associations" and "On the Party", the need arose to re-register the party for correcting deficiencies in the Charter of the Socialist Party. On 4 April 1997, the Bureau of the Political Executive Committee temporarily suspended the activities of the Socialist Party. Later that same year, the party ceased its active political activity.

Following the law "On Political Parties" from 15 July 2002, the party did not apply for re-registration in January 2003 which has remained unregistered since then.
