= Vladimir Ivanov (politician, born 1893) =

Soviet politician (1893–1938)

- Владимир Иванов
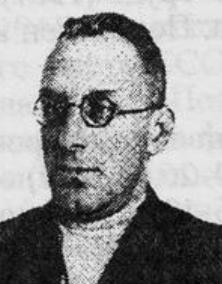

First Secretary of the Communist Party of Uzbekistan
- In office 12 February 1925 – 21 September 1927
- Preceded by: Abdullo Rakhimbayev
- Succeeded by: Kuprian Kirkizh

People's Commissar of the Timber Industry of the Soviet Union
- In office 1 October 1936 – 31 October 1937
- Preceded by: Semyon Lobov
- Succeeded by: Mikhail Ryzhkov

Personal details
- Born: August 27, 1893 Tula Governorate, Russian Empire
- Died: November 6, 1938 (aged 45) Moscow, Russian Soviet Federative Socialist Republic, Soviet Union
- Party: RSDLP (Bolsheviks) (1915–1918); All-Union Communist Party (Bolsheviks) (1918–1937)
- Profession: Physician

Vladimir Ivanovich Ivanov (Russian: Владимир Иванович Иванов; 27 August 1893 – 6 November 1938) was a Russian revolutionary and Soviet politician who served as the first First Secretary of the Communist Party of the Uzbek SSR from 1925 to 1927.

== Biography ==
Born into the family of a draftsman, Ivanov entered the Faculty of Medicine of the Imperial Moscow University in 1912. In 1915 he joined the Bolsheviks and participated in student demonstrations.

After the February Revolution he was secretary of the Khamovnichesky District Committee of the RSDLP (b) in Moscow. In 1917-1918 and during the October Revolution, he was a member of the Military Revolutionary Committee and the headquarters of the Red Guard of the Basmanny District and secretary of the Basmanny Russian Communist Party (b) of Moscow. From 1917 he was a member of the Presidium of the Moscow City Council and later the Moscow Committee of the RCP (b).

From September to November 1919, he was a member of the Revolutionary Military Council of the Fergana Front against the Basmachi movement in the Turkestan Autonomous Soviet Socialist Republic.

From May to October 1924 Ivanov was the chairman of the Moscow Control Commission of the RCP (b) and was head of the Moscow Workers' and Peasants' Inspection. He was a member of the Central Control Commission of the RCP (b) and a candidate member of the Presidium of the Central Control Commission of the RCP (b) from 1924 to 1925.

Ivanov served from 13 February 1925 until 1927 as the First Secretary of the Communist Party of Uzbekistan. His replacement was Kuprian Kirkizh.

From 1927 to 1931 he was the second secretary of the North Caucasian Regional Committee of the All-Union Communist Party (b). From 1931 to 1937 he was the first secretary of the Northern Regional Committee of the VKP (b).

Ivanov was a Candidate member of the Central Committee of the VKP (b) from 1925 to 1934 and a member of the Central Committee of the VKP (b) from 1934 to 1937.

From 1936 to 1937 he served as People's Commissar of the Timber Industry of the Soviet Union.

During the Great Purge, he was put on the last of the Moscow Trials, the Trial of the Twenty-One, and subsequently executed. He was rehabilitated in 1959.

Political offices
Preceded by Fayzulla Khodzhayev (as Chairman of the Revolutionary Committee)	Head of government of Uzbekistan; 1925 – 1927	Succeeded by Kuprian Kirkizh
Preceded by Position created	General Secretary of the Communist Party of the Uzbek SSR; 1925 – 1927	Succeeded by Kuprian Kirkizh
