= Anuarbek Alimzhanov =

Soviet Kazakh writer and politician

- Әнуар Әлімжанов; Änwar Älimjanov

Chairman of the Soviet of Republics of the Supreme Soviet of the Soviet Union
- In office 19 October – 26 December 1991
- Preceded by: Rafiq Nishonov (as chairman of the Soviet of Nationalities)
- Succeeded by: post abolished

Chairman of the Socialist Party of Kazakhstan
- In office March 1992 – 9 November 1993
- Preceded by: post established
- Succeeded by: Petr Svoik

Personal details
- Born: 2 May 1930 Qarlığaş, Alma-Ata District, Kazakh ASSR, RSFSR, USSR
- Died: 9 November 1993 (aged 63) Alma-Ata, Kazakhstan
- Party: Communist Party of the Soviet Union (1953–91); Socialist Party of Kazakhstan (1991-93)
- Education: Kazakh State University

Anuar Turlybekuly "Anuarbek" Alimzhanov (Kazakh: Әнуар Тұрлыбекұлы Әлімжанов, romanized: Änwar Turlıbekulı Älimjanov; 2 May 1930 – 9 November 1993) was a Soviet and Kazakh writer, publicist, public figure and politician. From October 29 to December 26, 1991, he headed the Soviet of Republics of the Supreme Soviet of the USSR, which adopted the Declaration on the termination of the existence of the USSR.

== Biography ==
He was born on May 2, 1930, in the village of Karlygash, Taldykorgan region. It comes from the Bolatshy subgenus of the Karakeri genus of the Naiman tribe.

From 1949 to 1954 he studied at the Kazakh State University in Alma-Ata.

In 1953 he joined the CPSU.

After graduating from the Faculty of Journalism, he worked as correspondent for Literaturnaya Gazeta (Moscow) in Central Asia and Kazakhstan.

From 1963 to 1967 he worked as the editor-in-chief of the Kazakhfilm film studio. In 1968, he was invited by his own correspondent of the newspaper Pravda (Moscow) in Kazakhstan. Since 1969, he has been the editor-in-chief of the literary weekly "Kazakh Adebieti". From 1970 to 1979, he was elected the first secretary of the Writers' Union of Kazakhstan. At the same time at the same time, but until 1986, he was secretary of the Board of the Union of Writers of the USSR.

Since 1986, he was elected Chairman of the Kazakh Cultural Foundation, Chairman of the Council of Peace and Harmony of the Republic of Kazakhstan. Deputy of the Supreme Soviet of the Kazakh SSR. People 's Deputy of the Kazakh SSR (1990–1993). He was repeatedly elected a member of the Presidium of the Supreme Soviet of the Kazakh SSR, a delegate to the 24th and 25th congresses of the CPSU.

Since 1959, he was Deputy Chairman of the Soviet Committee for Relations with Writers of Asia and Africa, was an active member of the Afro-Asian Writers Association and the European Community of Culture.

In 1981-1991, Chairman of the Kazakh Copyright Protection Agency.

In March-October 1991, President of the Association of Commercial Television and Radio Broadcasting of the Kazakh SSR.

From October 29 to December 26, 1991, he headed the Council of Republics of the Supreme Soviet of the USSR (formed by the USSR Law No. 2392-I of September 5, 1991, but not provided for by the Constitution of the USSR).

Under his chairmanship, on December 26, 1991, the Council of Republics adopted "Declaration No. 142-N" on the termination of the existence of the USSR, recognizing the Belovezh Accords and the creation of the CIS. As the Soviet Union voted itself out of existence, the session concluded with Alimzhanov's farewell to fellow councilmembers, "Until we meet again, wherever that may be."

In 1991, he was elected chairman of the Socialist Party of Kazakhstan.

He died on November 9, 1993. He was buried in Alma-Ata.

He was married to Flura Baynetova. He had a Son, Askar (born 1964).

== Bibliography ==
- 1962 — «Fifty thousand miles by water and land»;
- 1963 — «The caravan goes to the sun»;
- 1964 — «Blue Mountains» — a tale of modernity;
- 1966 — «Souvenir from Otrar»;
- 1969 — «Steppe Echo»,
- 1967 — «Makhambet 's Arrow»,
- 1973 — «The Messenger»
- 1974 — «The Throne of Rudaki», a historical novel;
- 1979 — «The Teacher's Return»,
- 1992 — «Cognition».

== Awards ==
- Order of Friendship of Peoples (08.05.1980)
- medal "For labour valour" (28.10.1967)
- other medals
- Laureate of the Abai State Prize;
- Laureate of the Komsomol Prize of Kazakhstan;
- Laureate of the International Nehru Prize (1969);
- Laureate of the international award "Lotus" (1974);
- Laureate of the International Neto Prize (1985).

== Memory ==
Streets in the cities of Alma-Ata, Astana, Taldykorgan and a school in the Almaty region are named after the famous writer.

== Literature ==
- Кто есть кто в России и ближнем зарубежье. М.: Новоевремя. 1993. ISBN 5-86564-033-X.
- Алимжанов, Ануар Турлыбекович // Казахстан. Национальная энциклопедия (рус.). — Алматы: Қазақ энциклопедиясы, 2004. — Т. I. — ISBN 9965-9389-9-7. (CC BY-SA 3.0)
- Алимжанов Ануар // Большая советская энциклопедия : [в 30 т.] / гл. ред. А. М. Прохоров. — 3-е изд. — М. : Советская энциклопедия, 1969—1978.
- Свет негаснущей звезды,
