= Yuldash Akhunbabaev =

Soviet politician

- Yoʻldosh Oxunboboyev (Uzbek); Юлдаш Ахунбабаев (Russian)
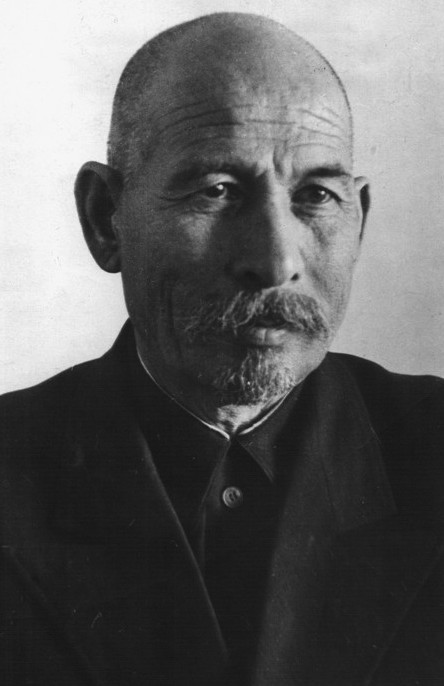

Chairman of the Presidium of the Supreme Soviet of the Uzbek SSR
- In office 21 July 1938 – 28 February 1943
- Preceded by: Usman Yusupov (as Chairman of the Supreme Soviet)
- Succeeded by: Abduvali Muminov

Chairman of the Central Executive Committee of the Uzbek SSR
- In office 17 February 1925 – 19 July 1938
- Preceded by: Office established
- Succeeded by: Office abolished

Chairman of the Margilan branch of the Koshchi Peasant Union
- In office November 1917 – 17 February 1925
- Preceded by: Office established
- Succeeded by: Office abolished

Personal details
- Born: Yuldash Akhunbaba ogli 13 July 1885 Dzhuybazar, Yaz-Yavan Volost, Margelan District, Russian Turkestan, Russian Empire
- Died: 28 February 1943 (aged 57) Tashkent, Uzbek SSR, Soviet Union
- Party: CPSU
- Awards: Order of Lenin Order of the Red Banner of Labour

Military service
- Allegiance: Soviet Union
- Branch/service: Workers' and Peasants' Red Army
- Years of service: 1925–1938
- Battles/wars: Basmachi Revolt

Yuldash Akhunbabaevich Akhunbabaev (Uzbek: Yoʻldosh Oxunboboyevich Oxunboboyev; Russian: Юлдаш Ахунбабаевич Ахунбабаев; 13 July 1885 – 28 February 1943) was a Soviet Uzbek politician, revolutionary, and communist activist who was one of the founding fathers of the Uzbek Soviet Socialist Republic.

== Early life and education ==
An ethnic Uzbek and Uyghur, Yuldash Akhunbabaev was born near the city of Margilan in a village called Dzhuybazar in Russian Turkestan. He was born into a poor peasant family and began to work as a farmworker for a large landowner from the age of nine. After his father's death in 1901, he began working at a ginnery in Margilan. Soon after in 1904, he left for Uzgen and worked there as a laborer and handyman until 1914. Due to his situation, he was unable to receive a proper education and was illiterate and did not speak Russian very well.

In 1914, Akhunbabaev returned to Margilan and joined anti-Russian and anti-monarchist movements in the area. He later took part in the Central Asian revolt of 1916. As a result, he was arrested by the Okhrana, which was the Tsarist secret police force, and was imprisoned for two months. He was a supporter of the February Revolution, but later supported the October Revolution and became pro-Bolshevik. After the formation of the Turkestan Autonomous Soviet Socialist Republic, he was appointed as the Chairman of the Margilan branch of the Koshchi Peasant Union.

== Political career ==
Akhunbabaev officially joined the Communist Party in May 1921. He actively fought against the Basmachi movement and its supporters, calling the supporters of the movement "a traitor to the people and the motherland."

Yuldash Akhunbabaev at a Young Pioneers parade in Tashkent in 1928

Yuldash Akhunbabaev took part in the National delimitation in the Soviet Union, becoming one of the founding fathers of the Uzbek Soviet Socialist Republic. In February 1925, he was a delegate to the First Constituent Congress of the Communist Party of Uzbekistan. At this congress, Akhunbabaev was elected a member of the Central Committee of the Communist Party of Uzbekistan and a member of the Political Bureau of the Central Committee of the Communist Party of Uzbekistan. On top of that, he was elected as the Chairman of the Presidium of the Central Executive Committee of the Uzbek SSR, becoming the de facto head of state of the Uzbek SSR. He served as the Chairman of the Presidium of the Central Executive Committee of the Uzbek SSR until July 19, 1938, when the Central Executive Committee of the Uzbek SSR was dissolved and replaced with the Supreme Soviet of the Uzbek SSR. On July 21, 1938, he became the first Chairman of the Presidium of the Supreme Soviet of the Uzbek SSR, partially succeeding himself and Usman Yusupov as the head of the Uzbek SSR. He held the position of Chairman of the Presidium of the Supreme Soviet of the Uzbek SSR until his death in 1943. He was also a deputy of the Supreme Soviet of the Soviet Union from 1937 until his death.

Yuldash Akhunbabaev among the delegates of the Third All-Union Congress of Soviets in 1925. Akhunbabaev is sitting in the center.

He often met and spoke with Joseph Stalin and other representatives of leadership in the Soviet Union. Although he did not directly participate in the Great Patriotic War, Akhunbabaev mobilized the entire labor force of the Uzbek SSR for rear support in the war. He also sent thousands of wagons loaded with flour, oil, fabrics, wool, metals, and other useful items to the front, using railways.

== Death ==
Yuldash Akhunbabaev died on 28 February 1943 in Tashkent, Uzbek SSR, Soviet Union. He managed to stay alive and unharmed during the Great Purge, despite the fact that he was a first generation Uzbek Communist, which increased the chances of being purged. The reason for Akhunbabaev's death is a subject of debate, with there still being no reliable sources that explain the cause of his death. He is buried at the Chigatai Cemetery.

== Awards ==
- Two Order of Lenin (21 January 1939, unknown date)
- Order of the Red Banner of Labour (22 December 1939)

== Legacy ==
There is a memorial museum dedicated to Yuldash Akhunbabaev in Tashkent, Uzbekistan. The memorial museum is located in a one-story mansion where Akhunbabaev lived from 1938 to 1943. There is also a theater in the Andijan Region, a theater in Tashkent, and a hardware factory in Tashkent named after him. There used to be a monument to Akhunbabaev in Samarkand, but was demolished after the independence of Uzbekistan in 1991. Another monument of him used to be in Angren, but was demolished sometime between 2016 and 2017.

== See also ==
- Basmachi Movement
- Uzbek Soviet Socialist Republic
- Supreme Soviet of the Uzbek SSR
