= Nuritdin Mukhitdinov =

Soviet politician

- Nuritdin Muhiddinov (Uzbek); Нуритдин Мухитдинов (Russian)

First Secretary of the Communist Party of Uzbekistan
- In office 22 December 1955 – 28 December 1957
- Preceded by: Amin Niyazov
- Succeeded by: Sobir Kamolov

Chairman of the Council of Ministers of the Uzbek Soviet Socialist Republic
- In office 18 December 1954 – 22 December 1955
- Preceded by: Usman Yusupov
- Succeeded by: Sobir Kamolov
- In office 18 May 1951 – 6 April 1953
- Preceded by: Abdurazak Mavlyanov
- Succeeded by: Usman Yusupov

Full member of the 20th Presidium
- In office 17 December 1957 – 17 October 1961

Candidate member of the 20th Presidium
- In office 27 February 1956 – 17 December 1957

Member of the 20th Secretariat
- In office 17 December 1957 – 17 October 1961

Personal details
- Born: 19 November [O.S. 6 November] 1917 Allan (near Tashkent), Russian Empire
- Died: 27 August 2008 (aged 90) Tashkent, Uzbekistan
- Party: Communist Party of the Soviet Union (1938–1985)
- Profession: Civil servant

Nuritdin Akramovich Mukhitdinov (Russian: Нуритдин Акрамович Мухитдинов, Uzbek: Nuritdin Akramovich Muhiddinov; 19 November 1917 [O.S. 6 November] – 27 August 2008) was a Soviet politician. Between 1957 and 1961 he was a member of the Presidium of the Central Committee of the Communist Party of the Soviet Union, significantly contributing to its relations with the Soviet republics and foreign countries in Asia. He was also the Soviet ambassador to Syria between 1968 and 1977.

== Biography ==
Mukhitdinov was born in the village Allan near Tashkent in a family of Uzbek farmers. After finishing an Uzbek-language school, in 1934 he was sent to the University of Trade in Moscow. He graduated in 1938 and worked in the Communist Party system, first at a factory in Bukhara, Uzbekistan, and then with the Soviet Army in Ukraine. During World War II he participated in combat and was wounded at the Battle of Stalingrad. He was demobilized in 1946 to assume various party posts in Uzbekistan. In 1948 he became a member of the Central Committee of the Communist Party and the next year was awarded the Order of Lenin. His party career became volatile in the 1950s. In 1953 Stalin recommended him for election to the Central Committee of the Communist Party. Later in the same year, after the death of Stalin, Mukhitdinov was demoted under pressure from Lavrentiy Beria from the post of the Chairman of the Council of Ministers of Uzbekistan.

His career rose after the removal of Beria in December 1953. Mukhitdinov was reinstated as Chairman of the Council of Ministers of Uzbekistan and was First Secretary of the Uzbek Central Committee of the Communist Party from 1955 to 1957. He opposed the attempted demotion of Nikita Khrushchev in 1957, and in return, Khrushchev recommended him to the Presidium, where he was the Secretary responsible for Central Asia. However, by the end of the 1950s, Mukhitdinov developed strong disagreements on planning policies with leading party members such as Mikhail Suslov, Anastas Mikoyan, Frol Kozlov, and later with Khrushchev himself. For example, Mukhitdinov opposed the proposal by Khrushchev to remove the remains of Stalin from the Mausoleum. As a consequence, in 1961 he was demoted from the Presidium and was on the verge of expulsion from the Central Committee, and only his popularity in the native Uzbekistan spared his Party career. He retained his international activities and in 1968-1977 served as the ambassador to Syria, eventually receiving the Order of Friendship of Peoples. After retirement in 1985 he returned to native Tashkent, where he worked as a government adviser, wrote several books, and died in 2008.

== Awards ==
- Two Order of Lenin (16 January 1950 and 11 January 1957)
- Order of the October Revolution (4 December 1987)
- Order of the Patriotic War 2nd class (11 March 1985)
- Order of the Red Banner of Labor (22 October 1971)
- Order of Friendship of Peoples (11 March 1974)
- Order of the Badge of Honor (5 November 1965)
