= 1990 Uzbek Supreme Soviet election =

Supreme Soviet elections were held in the Uzbek SSR on 18 February 1990. Of the 500 seats, 368 were decided in the first round. The result was a victory for the Communist Party of Uzbekistan, which won 348 of the 368 seats in the first round, whilst around 50 seats went to Unity.

Voter turnout was 94%.
