= Supreme Military Council =

Supreme Military Council may refer to:

- Supreme Military Council (Chad)
- Supreme Military Council (Equatorial Guinea)
- Supreme Council of the Armed Forces (Egypt)
- Supreme Military Council (Ghana)
- Supreme Military Council (Niger)
- Supreme Military Council (Nigeria 1966)
- Supreme Military Council (Nigeria 1983)
- Supreme Military Council (Syria)
- Supreme Military Council (Turkey)
- Revolutionary Military Council (1918–1934) in the Soviet Russia (USSR), sometimes referred as Supreme Military Council
- Supreme War Council (Japan)
