= Supreme People's Council =

The Supreme People's Council may refer to:

- Supreme People's Council (Prussian Poland)
- Supreme People's Council (South Yemen)
- Supreme People's Council (Laos)
- Supreme People's Council (North Korea)
