= 1999 Uzbek parliamentary election =

Parliamentary elections were held in Uzbekistan on 5 December 1999, with a second round in 66 of the 250 constituencies on 19 December. The People's Democratic Party of Uzbekistan emerged as the largest party, with 49 of the 250 seats. Voter turnout was 95.0%.

== Results ==
| Party | First round | | | Second round | | | Total seats | +/– |
| Party | Votes | % | Seats | Votes | % | Seats | Total seats | +/– |
|---|---|---|---|---|---|---|---|---|
| Local Council nominees | | | 98 | | | 12 | 110 | –57 |
| People's Democratic Party of Uzbekistan | | | 32 | | | 17 | 49 | –20 |
| Self-Sacrifice National Democratic Party | | | 19 | | | 15 | 34 | New |
| Progress of the Fatherland Party | | | 9 | | | 11 | 20 | +6 |
| Justice Social Democratic Party | | | 9 | | | 2 | 11 | New |
| Uzbekistan National Revival Democratic Party | | | 6 | | | 4 | 10 | New |
| Independents | | | 11 | | | 5 | 16 | New |
| Total | | | 184 | | | 66 | 250 | 0 |
| Total votes | 12,061,266 | – | | 2,918,055 | – | | | |
| Registered voters/turnout | 12,692,202 | 95.03 | | 3,338,912 | 87.40 | | | |
Source: Nohlen et al., CEC
