= Bakhodir Khan Turkistan =

Uzbekistani politician (born 1969)

Bahodir Xon Turkistan (born 1969), also written Bokhodir Choriyev, Bahodir Choryiev, Бахадир Чариев, Баҳодир Чориев, is the former majority stakeholder in Kesh company and an Uzbek opposition figure and a founder of the Birdamlik National Democratic Movement.

== Early life ==
He was born on 31 October 1969 into a working-class family in the Shahrisabz district of the Republic of Uzbekistan.

In 1986, he entered Tomsk Polytechnic University before continuing his education at the Tomsk Junior Professional College No 17.

After graduating in 1987, Bokhodir Choriyev started work at the Kontur IT company in Tomsk as a radio-installation specialist before being called up for military service the same year.

== Early career ==
He transferred to Tashkent State Technical University and graduated in 1994. He became a junior researcher at the scientific research institute of the Ministry of Finance of the Republic of Uzbekistan.

In 1995, he became the founder of the Uzbekistan-China joint venture called Suvjihozgaz. A year later in 1996, he founded a private company named Yangi ta'minot.

Then in 1999, he bought a 60.05% stake in Kesh, an open joint-stock company at the Tashkent Stock Exchange and, due to his majority ownership, was appointed temporary executive chairperson of Kesh on February 25, 2000.

Bokhodir Choriyev became a manager without resorting to bribes. His majority share in the company and the release of a large company to an outsider worried the authorities in a country where business activities were run by the authorities, as part of a planned economy, not a market economy.

Bokhodir Choriyev developed an economic plan to restore the commercial profitability of Kesh, which was near bankruptcy. This plan envisaged steps to dissociate from state authorities as much as possible. It included such projects as the elimination of state-ordered cotton monoculture, growing grain crops not on the basis of state plans, but for the requirements of the legal entity and other similar new economic decisions based on a market economy.

In 2000, Bokhodir Choriyev fought with local authorities to eliminate state-ordered cotton and grain crop monoculture plans, and as a result, in November 2000, Kesh was the first company in Uzbekistan whom the district governors freed from the state orders for cotton and grain crops. Kesh then continued business without obeying the state authorities, in the interests of the company and its shareholders working in accordance with existing legislation. But Shahrisabz's District Governor Shuhrat Allanazarov did not like Bokhodir Choriyev running the company activities based on free market economy.

In May 2000, the Kesh general meeting of the shareholders elected Bokhodir Choriyev chairperson of the board and this decision was quickly annulled by the oblast department of the State Committee on Property. However, when the Kesh shareholder meeting was held again in September 2000 they reinstated Bokhodir Choriyev as chairman.

One of the representatives of the government, the district's Water Facilities Manager and Deputy District Governor S. Pirimov stated at a General Meeting of Shareholders of OJSC Kesh: "The land belongs to the state; you and the people own the material assets of this company only. The shareholders should only receive their dividends on their shares and should not interfere with management affairs" These words divided the shareholders.

In September 2000, after the latest General Meeting of Shareholders of Kesh, the authorities initiated a criminal investigation against Bokhodir Choriyev and arrested him on January 2, 2001.

On January 4, 2001, the local authorities hurriedly appointed a new executive chairman of Kesh in Bokhodir Choriev's place. The new chairman signed a contract with the government and imposed obligations of cropping cotton and grain crops in line with government orders.

== Court process ==
=== First court case ===
The first court hearing was held in Chahrisabz district in March 2001. The district judge sent the case back for additional investigation, The second court hearing was held in June 2001 in the Kitob District. The Kitob district judge freed him on bail and sent the case back for additional investigation.

=== Ongoing hearings ===
The next session was held by the Qamashi district criminal court against the procedural rules and legislation on hearing the cases in participation of two court councillors, the judge considered the case in the presence of three councillors .

In 2002, the Qamashi district criminal court sentenced Bokhodir Choriyev to six years' imprisonment and released him by applying an amnesty act with a ban on taking any management positions for three years thereafter.

In 2002 and 2003, Bokhodir Choriyev and his associates in Kesh participated in several court proceedings in order to reinstate their rights and management positions at Kesh. The Kesh case moved to the capital city of Tashkent. The group that had subsequently achieved ownership of Kesh started imposing direct pressure on the supporters of Bokhodir Choriyev through M. Asqarov, Head of the Uzbekistan Committee for State Property in their favor for a large bribe.

In violation of the Law "on shareholding companies and protection of shareholders' rights" and abusing his authority, M. Asqarov reduced Bokhodir Choriyev's share of the company from 60.05% to 15% by having additional shares issued. Dozens of court cases were initiated to consider the plaintiff's claims. Bokhodir Choriyev and his supporters demonstrated demanding M. Asqarov's retirement from his position of the Head of The Committee for State Property.

When the court proceedings were almost finalized in favor of the shareholders of the public company, the National Security Services (NSS) stepped in.

== Human rights work ==
For the purposes of getting out of the region and winning the legal battle, he had initially joined a Human Rights organisation. He studied the activities of Human Rights organisations and opposition activities; and in the course of 2003 organised several pickets, protest demonstrations in protection of his own rights.

In order to earn a living, he used his private car as a taxi, and though it was illegal, together with his wife Feruza Khanum sold newspapers and journals in the streets.

Once he understood the real purpose and sense of Islam Karimov's regime, he realized the difficulty of fighting for human rights under existing laws and conditions in Uzbekistan.

== Political activities ==
He started looking for ways to fight this regime. Bokhodir Choriyev continued his fight until March 2004 within the existing legislation in the country. When he was unable to win back Kesh, he announced he was joining the opposition.

On April 10, 2004, he founded the Birdamlik movement, which later became the Birdamlik National Democratic Movement, with the target of peaceful opposition to the regime. He tried to organize meetings and protest demonstrations, but on May 21, 2004, was severely beaten, had a sack put on his head while his feet and hands tied, and he was kidnapped by NSS. He was left severely injured in his underwear in an abandoned industrial building near the Chirchiq River in Tashkent. His car was burned on the same day.

The meeting he organised on June 1, 2004, International Children's Day, had great resonance. Facing serious pressure because of his political activity and unable to support his family, in June 2004, the family left Uzbekistan.

With the help of the UN High Commissioner for Refugees in Moscow, on February 10, 2005, the US government granted political asylum to him and his family. From the US, he organized protest demonstrations in Uzbekistan. One such demonstration was held on May 3, 2005.

He had several books on peaceful resistance translated from English into Uzbek. He met with Gene Sharp and had his books From Dictatorship to Democracy and "There are realistic alternatives" translated. He met with Robert Helvey and had his book On Strategic Nonviolent Conflict translated, as well as the book "50 important issues in non-violence fight" about the Yugoslavian Otpor activist group, as well as many other books, scientific works and articles translated into Uzbek and delivered to activists in Uzbekistan. This also included translating into Uzbek the movie Bringing Down A Dictator narrated by Martin Sheen, and Bokhodir Choriyev dubbed the movie into Uzbek.

In October 2009, Bokhodir Choriyev announced that he was going back to Uzbekistan to continue his political activities in the country. On his return, he was arrested at the Tashkent International Airport and the authorities brought a criminal case against him. He was released conditionally.

== Birdamlik Movement ==
With Dilorom Is'hoqova of the "Birdamlik" People's Democratic Movement, he traveled to most regions of Uzbekistan and tried to organize a congress of the Birdamlik Movement. The government authorities put heavy barriers to the representatives from other oblasts of Uzbekistan to travel to the Congress, held in November 2009. As a result, the Congress was attended by the representatives of the Qashqadaryo Region only, and was considered to have been not a congress but a regional conference of the movement.

In December 2009, Bokhodir Choriyev returned to the US and continued his political activities. From 2010 to 2014, Bokhodir Choriyev held dozens of small and large demonstrations in Uzbekistan and abroad.

In order to shut Bokhodir Choriyev down, in 2013 Islam Karimov's regime imprisoned his father, Hasan Choriev, who died two months later of an illness he contracted in prison.

After his death, the Karimov regime made it impossible to bury Hasan Choriev at a cemetery. The NSS threatened those who came to the funeral and most of them were forced to leave the ceremony. Under instructions by and strict control of NSS, all coffins in the Shahrisabz and neighbouring districts were collected for "disinfection" All imams and mullas in the district, who could perform the funeral namaz service were taken under strict control and prevented from going to the funeral.

Hasan Choriev's close friend, Imam Omonkhon was forcefully kept in the district NSS offices until after the funeral. When it became clear that digging a grave was impossible, sitting in the US, Bokhodir Choriyev had to phone call his brothers to dig a grave in their father's garden. Only after this, the authorities gave a permission to allot a piece of land for digging a grave.

The Birdamlik People's Democratic Movement made two political full size animation films. The Movement founded the newspaper "Turkiston tongi" (Turkiston morning), published in Kazakh and Uzbek languages. The Movement established the "Turon" online radio and TV. In 2006, they founded the site www.birdamlik.info and in 2013 – www.mulkdor.com. From its initial foundation days, the Movement has been running its activities owing to the voluntary assistance from the Head of the Movement Bokhodir Choriyev and its activists.

The "Birdamlik" People's Democratic Movement continues its activities without assistance from any government or organisation. Bokhodir Choriyev is using almost 60% of his personal income to carry out his political activities.

On April 26–27, 2014, the "Birdamlik" PDM managed to hold their first Congress in Saint Louis, USA. The Congress introduced and approved the Movement's Charter, Program, Manual One, Manual Two and other documents. During presidential elections in March 2015, alternative online presidential elections were held at the initiative of Bokhodir Choriyev. Nine candidates participated. Bokhodir Choriyev won.

The dictator of Uzbekistan, Islam Karimov, removed Bokhodir Choriyev's Uzbekistan citizenship.
