= Birdamlik =

Political organization in Uzbekistan

Birdamlik People's Democratic Party “Birdamlik” xalq-demokratik partiyasi
- Leader: Bakhodir Khan Turkistan
- Founded: 10 April 2004; 22 years ago
- Headquarters: United States
- Newspaper: Mulkdor; Turkiston tongi
- Ideology: Economic liberalism Populism
- Political position: Centre-right
- Colours: Blue
- Slogan: Kuch birlikda ("Strength Is in Unity")
- Legislative Chamber: 0 / 150

Website
- birdamlik.info

Birdamlik, officially Birdamlik People's Democratic Party (Uzbek: “Birdamlik” xalq demokratik partiyasi, lit. 'Solidarity – People's Democratic Party'), is a political organization based in Uzbekistan. It has promoted economic liberalism and nonviolent resistance through populist rhetoric.

== History ==
On April 10, 2004, Bakhodir Khan Choriyev founded the "Movement Birdamlik", later renamed to "People's Democratic Movement". It is registered in the United States, Norway, Sweden, and operates in Russia, Kazakhstan, Kyrgyzstan, Turkey, Ukraine and Uzbekistan (including the Autonomous Republic of Karakalpakstan).

On May 21, 2004, Choriev interfered with protesters in an unsuccessful attempt to organize them. He was attacked and kidnapped by the police, who covered his head in a bag and tied his hands and feet. He was abandoned naked on a riverbank of Chirchik in the Tashkent region. The same day, protesters burned his car.

=== Protests ===
Bakhodir Khan Choriev organized protests on June 1, 2004, International Children's Day. Police and KGB prevented an attempt of Uzbekistan human rights defenders to hold the first meeting since Uzbekistan's independence.

Representatives of police and KGB started looking for potential activists early in the morning near their homes. Policemen dressed in civilian clothing to look for human rights activist Yuri Konoplev.

These "bodyguards" gathered near the entrance of the house where activist Abdujalil Bolmatov lived. Choriev's house was surveilled by a police bus. Due to a blockade, many activists, Choriev and Konoplev could not reach the protest at the square in front of the Telecompany. Security forces and intelligence agencies did not allow people to attend the meeting.

The last meetings were held in Uzbekistan in the late 1980s and early 1990s on the initiative of Birlik.

Choriev applied to the administration of Tashkent, for permission for a protest. He pre-paid costs for security during the protest. However, the city authorities did not respond to his appeal. The initiators of the failed meeting planned to demand the resignation of President Islam Karimov.

=== Political asylum ===
United Nations High Commissioner for Refugees in Moscow helped Choriev and his family to leave Uzbekistan. On February 10, 2005, Choriev and his family were granted political asylum in the United States. Choriev organized several protests in Uzbekistan while in exile. One happened on May 3, 2005. He organized the translation of several books on nonviolent political struggle.

=== Return to Uzbekistan ===
In November 2009, Choriev made a statement about his return to Uzbekistan. He went back to Uzbekistan to continue his political activities. Immediately after arriving in Tashkent he was arrested. Authorities opened a criminal case against him, but he was conditionally released.

Despite the persecution and pressure, together with Dilor Iskhokovoy (head of the department of the Birdamlik), Choriev visited most regions of the country. He tried to hold a congress of the movement. The government resisted the arrival of representatives from other regions of Uzbekistan. As a result, only the representatives of Kashkadarya region were able to participate, leading it to be receive the status of Regional Conference of the Movement. Choriev returned to the US in December 2009 and continued his political activities.

On April 26–27, Birdamlik managed held a congress in St. Louis. The Congress approved the Charter Movement Program Guide One, Two, a Manual and other documents.

During 2010–2014, Choriev held dozens of protests. In 2013, to silence him, Uzbek authorities organized a provocation against his father Hassan Choriev.

Birdamlik created two full-length, animated political films. It founded the newspaper Turkistan ovozi (Voice of Turkestan), registered in Kazakhstan. It launched online radio and TV station "Turon". In 2006 the website www.birdamlik.info launched, followed in 2013 by www.mulkdor.com. Birdamlik continues its activities. Choriev spends most of the revenue on the exercise of political activity, amounting to almost half a million US dollars.
