= Poʻlat Habibullayev =

Uzbek physicist

- Born: 14 October 1936; Asaka District, Andijan Region, Uzbek SSR, USSR
- Died: 7 February 2010 (aged 73); Tashkent, Uzbekistan
- Education: Central Asia State University
- Awards: Order of the Red Banner of Labor

Poʻlat Qirgʻizboyevich Habibullayev (Uzbek: Poʻlat Qirgʻizboyevich Habibullayev, Russian: Пулат Киргизбаевич Хабибуллаев, Pulat Kirgizbaevich Khabibullaev; 14 October 1936 — 7 February 2010) was an Uzbek physicist and politician who served as President of the Academy of Sciences of the Uzbek SSR from 1984 to 1988. In addition to his academic positions, he held a variety of high government offices, including being the Chairman of the Presidium of the Supreme Soviet of the Uzbek SSR from 1988 to 1989.

== Early life ==
Born on 14 October 1936 in Asaka district to an Uzbek family. His mother, Soliyakhon Tashlanova, was very active in Uzbek society, leading a cotton kolkhoz. When he was only two months old, his mother brought him with her to a conference in Moscow, and before he was born, she had been photographed meeting Joseph Stalin and Kliment Voroshilov. From 1958 to 1960, he worked as head of the department of general physics of the Tashkent State Pedagogical Institute, and, in 1960, he graduated from Central Asia State University.

== Academic career ==
After graduating from Central Asia State University in 1960 he continued his studies, defending his dissertation in Moscow in 1964 and going on to become a doctor of Physical and Mathematical Sciences in 1971. From then to 1975 he worked as rector of the Andijan Cotton Institute, and from then to 1978 he served as head of the Department of Science and Education Institutions of the Central Committee of the Communist Party of the Uzbek SSR. Having become a correspondent member of the Academy of Sciences of the Uzbek SSR in 1979, he served as the vice president of the academy from until 1984; that year he became a full member of the academy. Meanwhile, from 1978 to 1988, he served as director of the Institute of Nuclear Physics. From 1984 to 1988, he was president of the Academy of Sciences of the Uzbek SSR. Starting in 1989 he headed the Department of Thermal Physics, then from 1992 to 1994 he headed the Department of Optics at the university, which had been renamed after independence. In 2010 he returned to heading the Department of Thermal Physics of the Academy of Sciences. He was also a corresponding member of the Soviet Academy of Sciences, later the Russian Academy of Sciences, and was elected a member of Islamic Academy of Sciences based in Amman, Jordan.

His scientific work included study of acoustic spectroscopy, physical and quantum acoustics, nanophysics and physics of soft media, nonlinear optics and laser thermochemistry, physics of superionic conductors and quantum-scale systems, nuclear physics and radiation materials science, nonlinear dynamics and chaos, physics and chemistry of isotopes, and laser photosynthesis. He was a contributing author on over 500 scientific papers as well as author of over a dozen monographs, several of which were published by foreign publishers. In addition, he trained over 200 candidates and 40 doctors of science as well as working as an editor of various academic journals and authoring physics textbooks for Uzbek universities.

== Political career ==
Having been a member of the Communist Party in 1965, Habibullayev held a variety of high political offices in the Uzbek SSR in addition to his academic posts. From 1985 to 1988, while simultaneously working as head of the Academy of Sciences, he served as chairman of the Supreme Soviet of the Uzbek SSR as well as a deputy in the Supreme of Soviet during the eleventh convocation from 1984 to 1989. He went on to serve as Chairman of the Presidium of the Supreme Soviet of the Uzbek SSR and be Deputy Chairman of the Presidium of the Supreme Soviet of the USSR from 1988 to 1989. From 1990 to 1994 he chaired the Committee on International Affairs of the Supreme Council of Uzbekistan, from that year until 2002 he served as Chairman of the State Committee for Science and Technology of Uzbekistan, followed by working as Director of the Center for Science and Technology under the Cabinet of Ministers of the Republic of Uzbekistan from 2002 to 2006.

== Awards ==
- Two Order of the Red Banner of Labor
- Order of the Badge of Honor
- Order of Labor Glory (Uzbekistan)
- Biruni State Prize
