= Self-Sacrifice National Democratic Party =

Defunct political party in Uzbekistan

Self-Sacrifice National Democratic Party Fidokorlar milliy demokratik partiyasi
- Abbreviation: FMDP
- Leader: Axtam Tursunov
- Founded: 4 January 1999
- Registered: 25 July 2000
- Dissolved: 20 June 2008
- Split from: VTP; XDP
- Merged into: Milliy Tiklanish
- Headquarters: Tashkent
- Newspaper: Fidokor
- Membership (2004): 61,750
- Ideology: Conservatism
- Political position: Right-wing
- National affiliation: Democratic Bloc
- Colours: Blue
- Slogan: Biz butun kuchimizni xalq uchun, Vatan uchun berib yashashimiz kerak ("We Must Live, Giving All Our Strength for the Sake of the People, for the Sake of the Motherland!")
- Anthem: State Anthem of Uzbekistan
- 2nd Oliy Majlis: 34 / 250
- 1st Legislative Chamber: 18 / 120

The Self-Sacrifice National Democratic Party (Uzbek: Fidokorlar Milliy Demokratik Partiyasi), often abbreviated as Fidokorlar, was a political party in Uzbekistan.

In December 28, 1998, the party held its founding congress; it published the first issue of its sociopolitical newspaper Fidokor on February 4, 1999.

During the 2004–05 Uzbek parliamentary election, the party won 18 out of the 120 seats in the Legislative Chamber of Uzbekistan, the lower house of the Oliy Majlis. In 2007, the party merged with the Uzbekistan National Revival Democratic Party (Uzbek: O'zbekistan Milliy Tiklanish Demokratik Partiyasi), as the two parties shared common goals. The new group retained the National Revival Democratic Party name.

== See also ==
- Politics of Uzbekistan
