= Inomjon Usmonxoʻjayev =

Soviet Uzbek politician (1930–2017)

- Иномжон Усмонхўжаев
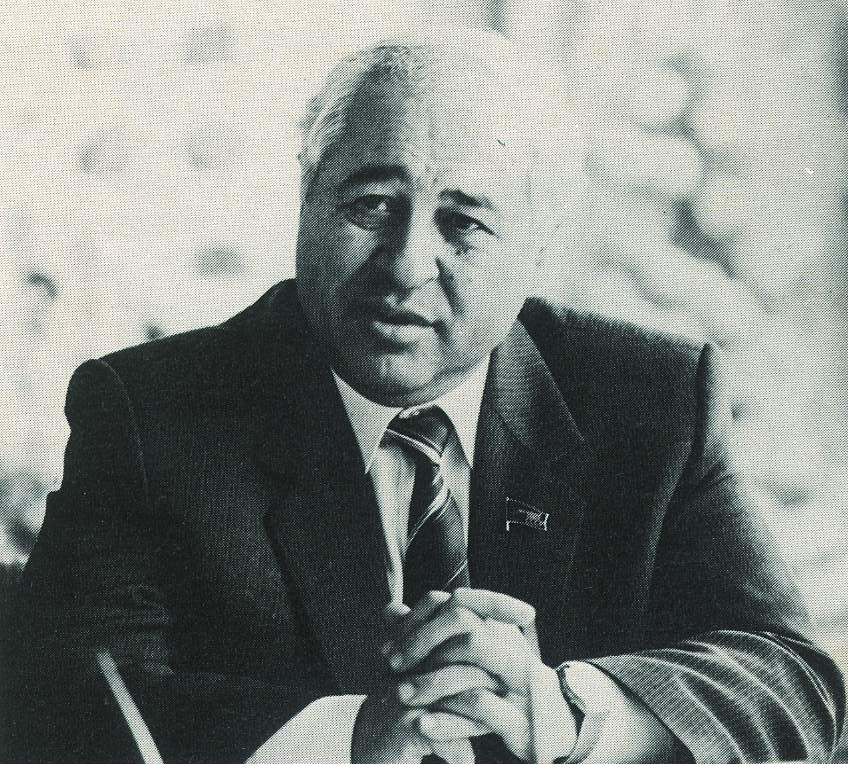
- Usmonxoʻjayev circa 1983

11th First Secretary of the Communist Party of Uzbek SSR
- In office 3 November 1983 – 12 January 1988
- Preceded by: Sharof Rashidov
- Succeeded by: Rafiq Nishonov

Personal details
- Born: Inomjon Buzrukovich Usmonxo'jaev; Иномжон Бузрукович Усмонхўжаев; 22 May 1930 Fergana, Soviet Union (now Uzbekistan)
- Died: 17 March 2017 (aged 86) Fergana, Uzbekistan
- Party: Communist Party

Inomjon Buzrukovich Usmonxoʻjayev (in Uzbek Cyrillic: Иномжон Бузрукович Усмонхўжаев; in Russian: Инамджан Бузрукович Усманходжаев Inamdzhan Buzrukovich Usmankhodzhayev; 22 May 1930 – 17 March 2017) served as the eleventh First Secretary of the Communist Party of the Uzbek SSR. Usmonxoʻjayev became General Secretary following the disastrous "Cotton Scandal".

== The cotton scandal ==
Usmonxoʻjayev succeeded Sharof Rashidov, who had been General Secretary since the 1950s. As orders from Moscow to grow more and more cotton spiraled in, the Uzbek government had respond by reporting miraculous growth in land irrigated and harvested, and record improvements in production and efficiency. Today it is known that most of these records were falsified. Falsification of the results involved many officials in both central Soviet government in Moscow and Uzbekistan.

In 1986, it was announced that almost the entire party and government leadership of the republic had conspired in falsifying cotton production figures. A massive purge (only one minister survived the purge) of Uzbek leadership was carried out, with prosecutors brought in from Moscow, leading to widespread arrests, executions, and suicides. It may never be known how high the corruption extended, as Leonid Brezhnev's own son-in-law, Yuri Churbanov was implicated in the affair.

In 1989, Usmonxoʻjayev was charged with involvement in the "cotton scandal" and sentenced to 12 years in prison. After a short time, in 1990 he was released from prison, but was not fully acquitted. The Supreme Court of Uzbekistan fully rehabilitated Usmonxoʻjayev on 18 November 2016, after the death of the first president of the country Islam Karimov.

== Usmonxoʻjayev's term ==
It was while Usmonxoʻjayev was General Secretary that satellite images showed that the Uzbek government's reports were false. Usmonxoʻjayev held his position throughout the scandal, serving as a puppet of Moscow as the Central Committee tried to strengthen its grip in Uzbekistan. Usmonxoʻjayev was General Secretary from 3 November 1983 until 12 January 1988. His replacement was Rafiq Nishonov.

On 12 January 1988, he was relieved of his duties as first secretary of the Central Committee of the Communist Party of Uzbekistan "in connection with his retirement", and on 24 May 1988, he was removed from the Presidium of the Supreme Soviet of the USSR. On 28 November 1988, he was removed from the Central Committee of the CPSU "as having compromised himself."

He died on 17 March 2017 at the age of 85.

Party political offices
Preceded by Sharof Rashidov	First Secretary of the Communist Party of the Uzbek SSR; 1983–1988	Succeeded by Rafiq Nishonov
