= Communist Party of Uzbekistan =

Ruling party of the Uzbek Soviet Socialist Republic

Communist Party of Uzbekistan Коммунистическая партия Узбекистана (Russian) Ўзбекистон Коммунистик Партияси (Uzbek)
- Founded: 12 February 1925
- Dissolved: 3 November 1991
- Succeeded by: People's Democratic Party of Uzbekistan
- Ideology: Communism; Marxism–Leninism
- Political position: Far-left
- National affiliation: Communist Party of the Soviet Union
- Colours: Red
- Supreme Soviet (1990): 456 / 500 (91%)

Party flag

The Communist Party of Uzbekistan (Note: Russian: Коммунистическая партия Узбекистана, romanized: Kommunisticheskaya partiya Uzbekistana; Uzbek: Ўзбекистон Коммунистик Партияси, romanized: Oʻzbekiston Kommunistik Partiyasi) (KPUz) was the ruling communist party of the Uzbek Soviet Socialist Republic which operated as a republican branch of the Communist Party of the Soviet Union (CPSU). On 14 September 1991, the party announced its withdrawal from the CPSU.

== History ==
The Communist Party of Uzbekistan was formed alongside the Uzbek Soviet Socialist Republic. The Politburo of the Communist Party of the Soviet Union mandated the creation of creation of republics and accompanying national parties on 12 June 1924. The membership of the party was an amalgamation of the Communist Party of Turkestan, Communist Party of Bukhara, and Communist Party of Khorezm. Akmal Ikramov was made first secretary, Fayzulla Xoʻjayev was made head of the Council of People's Commissars, and Yuldash Akhunbabaev was made head of the Central Executive Committee. Uzbeks accounted for 43% of the membership of the KPUz in 1925.

The Communist Party of Greece (KKE) had 8,173 members in Tashkent in 1955. Conflict broke out between the KPUz and KKE as internal KKE opponents of Nikos Zachariadis were supported by the Soviets.

The KPUz was initially dominated by people from Tashkent and Fergana regions. However, Sharof Rashidov, who was from the region of Samarkand, was appointed first secretary in 1959, and served until his death in 1983. Inomjon Usmonxoʻjayev, who was from Fergana, served as first secretary from 1983 to 1988. Rafiq Nishonov, who was from Tashkent, briefly served before being replaced by Islam Karimov, who was from Samarkand, in 1989.

The People's Democratic Party of Uzbekistan is the successor to the KPUz.

== First Secretaries ==
No.	Picture	Name (birth–death)	Took office	Left office	Political party
First Secretary
1		Vladimir Ivanov (1893–1938)	12 February 1925	1927	CPSU
2		Kuprian Kirkizh (1886–1932)	1927	April 1929	CPSU
3		Nikolai Gikalo (1897–1938)	April 1929	11 June 1929	CPSU
4		Isaak Zelensky (1890–1938)	June 1929	December 1929	CPSU
5		Akmal Ikramov (1898–1938)	December 1929	21 September 1937	CPSU
6		Pyotr Yakovlev (?–?)	21 September 1937	27 September 1937	CPSU
7		Usman Yusupov (1901–1966)	27 September 1937	7 April 1950	CPSU
8		Amin Niyazov (1903–1973)	7 April 1950	22 December 1955	CPSU
9		Nuritdin Mukhitdinov (1917–2008)	22 December 1955	28 December 1957	CPSU
10		Sobir Kamolov (1910–1990)	28 December 1957	15 March 1959	CPSU
11		Sharof Rashidov (1917–1983)	15 March 1959	31 October 1983	CPSU
12		Inomjon Usmonxoʻjayev (1932–2017)	3 November 1983	12 January 1988	CPSU
13		Rafiq Nishonov (1927–2023)	12 January 1988	23 June 1989	CPSU
14		Islam Karimov (1938–2016)	23 June 1989	3 November 1991	CPSU

== Works cited ==
=== Books ===
- Edgar, Adrienne (2004). Tribal Nation: The Making of Soviet Turkmenistan. Princeton University Press. ISBN 9780691127996.
- Khalid, Adeeb (2015). Making Uzbekistan: Nation, Empire, and Revolution in the Early USSR. Cornell University Press. ISBN 9780801454097.
- Marantzidis, Nikos (2023). Making Uzbekistan: Nation, Empire, and Revolution in the Early USSR. Cornell University Press. ISBN 9781501767661.

=== Journals ===
- Kangas, Roger (1994). "Problems of State-Building in the Central Asian Republics". World Affairs. 157 (1). Wiley: 29–37. doi:10.2307/20672405. JSTOR 20672405.
- Khalid, Adeeb (2003). "A Secular Islam: Nation, State, and Religion in Uzbekistan". International Journal of Middle East Studies. 35 (4). Cambridge University Press: 573–598. doi:10.2307/3879864. JSTOR 3879864.
- Tunçer-Kılavuz, İdil (2023). "Varieties and Degrees of Authoritarianism in Central Asia: "Established" vs. "Networked" Patronal Authoritarianism in Turkmenistan and Uzbekistan". Region. 12 (1). Slavica Publishers: 93–120. doi:10.2307/27298196. JSTOR 27298196.
