= Akmal Ikramov =

Uzbek Soviet politician (1898–1938)

- Акмаль Икрамов
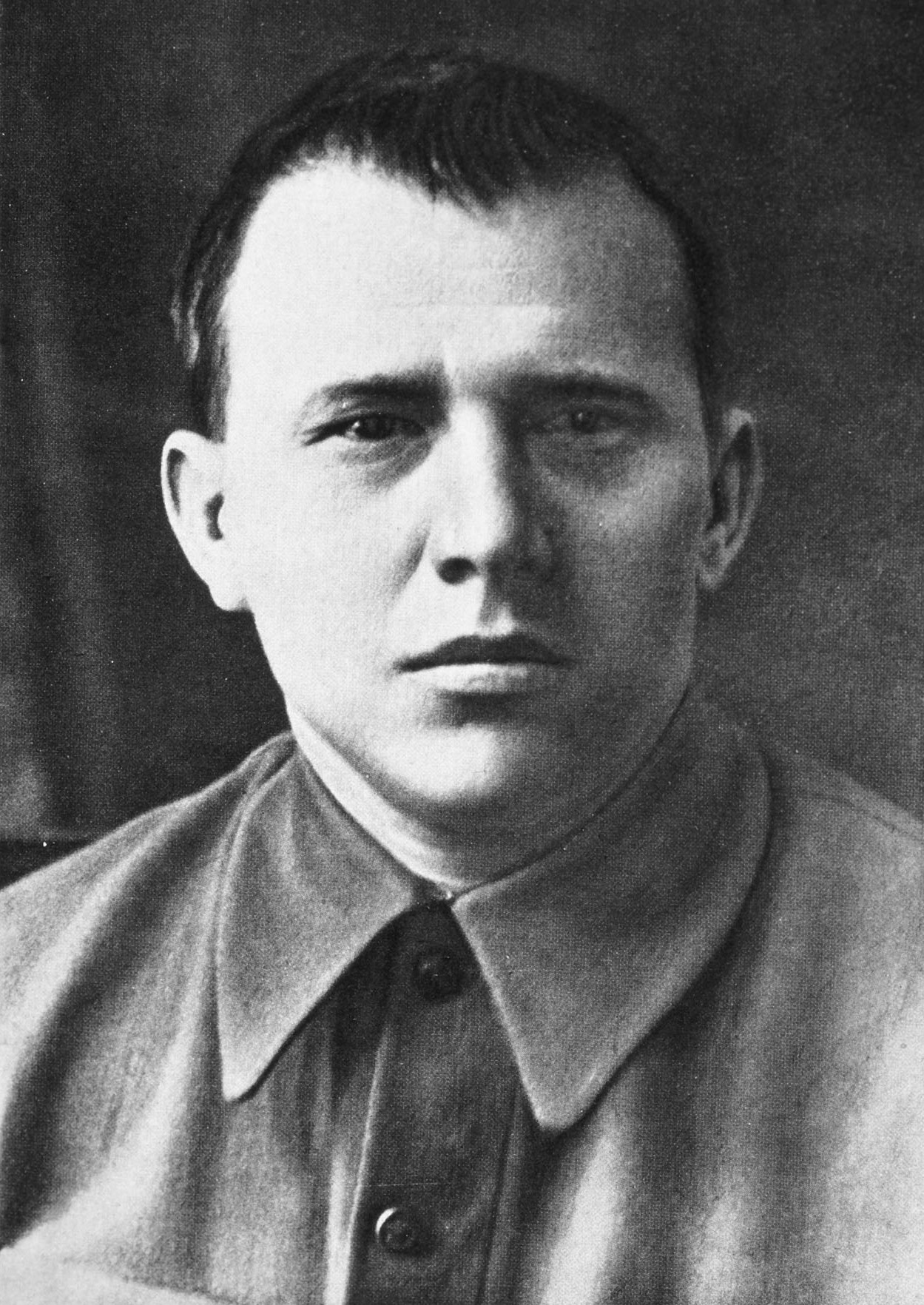

First Secretary of the Central Committee of the Communist Party of Uzbekistan
- In office December 1929 – 27 September 1937
- Preceded by: Isaak Zelensky
- Succeeded by: Dzhura Tyuryabekov (acting)

First Secretary of the Tashkent Regional Committee of the All-Union Communist Party (b)
- In office December 1929 – September 1937

Personal details
- Born: 1898 Tashkent, Syr-Darya Oblast, Russian Empire
- Died: 13 March 1938 (aged 39–40) Kommunarka shooting ground, Moscow, Russian SFSR, Soviet Union
- Party: All-Union Communist Party (b) (1918–1937)
- Education: Sverdlov Communist University

Akmal Ikramovich Ikramov (Russia: Акмаль Икрамович Икрамов; Uzbek: Akmal Ikromovich Ikromov; 1898 – 13 March 1938) was an Uzbek politician active in Uzbek SSR politics and served as the First Secretary of the Central Committee of the Communist Party of Uzbekistan from 1929 to 1937. He was arrested and executed in 1938 as part of the Great Purge during the Stalin era.

== Life ==
=== Career ===
Ikramov was born in 1898 in an Uzbek family in Tashkent, then part of the Russian Empire. In 1918 he joined the Communist Party. From 1921 to 1922 he was secretary of the Central Committee of the Communist Party of Turkestan. In 1922 he moved to Moscow where he studied at the Sverdlov Communist University. While in Moscow, Ikramov kept on campaigning within the Party for raising the cultural level of Turkestan by increasing literacy and building more schools. Meanwhile, Ikramov became involved in a power struggle among the Communists between those favoring a Pan-Turkist government like Turar Ryskulov, and those in favor of dividing the Turkestan Autonomous Soviet Socialist Republic into smaller ethnic or regional units, such as Fayzulla Khodzhayev and Ikramov. The latter group won, as national delimitation in Central Asia began in 1924. In January 1925 he became secretary of the Tashkent Oblast committee in the newly formed Uzbek Soviet Socialist Republic and was also for a time active as chief editor of the magazine Communist. In 1929, he became First Secretary of the Communist Party of Uzbekistan and thus de facto head of government in Soviet Uzbekistan. He was the first ethnic Uzbek in this office, which he held until 1937. In 1930 his predecessor Isaak Zelensky tried to depose him, but since the Central Committee supported Ikramov, this attempt failed. Ikramov led the forced introduction of collectivised agriculture in Uzbekistan, in line with the policy set in Moscow by Joseph Stalin, and implemented a decision to make Uzbekistan the main source of cotton in the USSR. In 1934, he was elected to the Central Committee of the Communist Party of the Soviet Union, the only representative of any of the ethnic Asian minorities.

=== Anti-religious policies ===
Ikramov bore the most responsibility for designing the specifics of the design of anti-Islamic actions during the first five-year plan. Sometimes he personally ordered the arrest of clergymen. Further measures to struggle against the clergy were taken, as Ikramov put it, "not by prohibitive measures, but by measures developed from broad party-organizational and cultural enlightenment work."

=== Great Purge ===
In February 1937, near the start of the Great Purge, Ikramov took part in a plenum of the Central Committee which determined the fate of two leading Bolsheviks, Nikolai Bukharin and Alexei Rykov, who had led the opposition to forced collectivisation. He denounced them as "renegades", accused them of leading an "uprising against the party, against soviet power" and called for them to be put on trial. In June, after he had returned to Uzbekistan's capital, Tashkent, his rival, Khodzhayev, was denounced, sacked, and later arrested.

Despite these displays of severity and loyalty, Stalin complained in a telegram to the Uzbek party leadership on 2 August 1937 that "there is no struggle against anti-Soviet elements in Uzbekistan, and Ikramov is surrounded by such elements but does not see them." Ikramov was publicly censured on 8 September 1937, after the Politburo member Andrey Andreyev had descended on Tashkent, for being sufficiently vigilant in rooting out 'enemies of the people'. On 10 September, he was violently denounced in Pravda for defending a 'Trotskyite' Secretary of the Uzbekistan Central Committee. On 12 September, it was announced that he had been expelled from the party and was under investigation. In October, news broke that he was arrested, together with Khodzhayev.

In March 1938, Ikramov was a defendant in the last of the great Moscow show trials, alongside Bukharin and Rykov, whom he had denounced as renegades a year earlier, and his old rivals Zelensky and Khodzhayev. He 'confessed' to having been a Trotskyite since 1923, a leader since 1928 of a secret nationalist movement plotting independence for Uzbekistan, and to having been recruited by Bukharin to the 'right opposition' in 1933. He also 'confessed' that the waste that resulted from over ambitious targets for cotton production and uncompleted construction work had been sabotage, and that he was a British spy. Ikramov was quoted saying: "We had to rely on a strong European Power to help us. We thought England most reliable because she is so strong." He was sentenced to death on 13 March and shot on 13 March (other sources indicate 15 March) 1938.

=== Rehabilitation ===
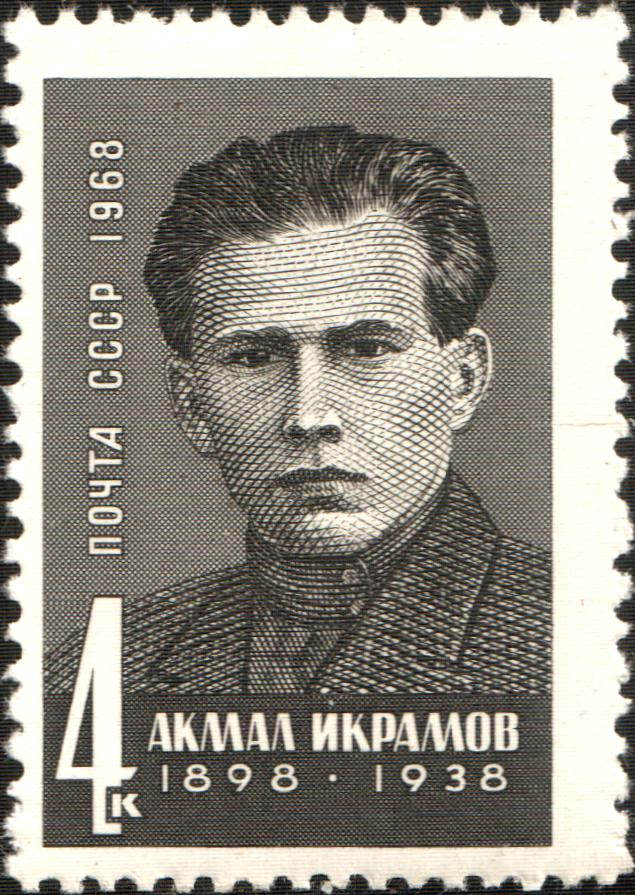
Akmal Ikramov on a 1968 Soviet stamp

During the Khrushchev Thaw, Ikramov's son Kamal requested that the first secretary of Uzbekistan rehabilitate his father. The secretary brought the case to Nikita Khrushchev personally, who then asked Vyacheslav Molotov to look at it. After a year, in 1957, Akmal Ikramov was reinstated in the Party, although the document reinstating him was classified as "Confidential". He was the first defendant from any of the Stalinist show trials to be rehabilitated.

== Sources ==
- Ikramov, Akmal’ Ikramovich article from The Great Soviet Encyclopedia, 3rd Edition (1970-1979).
- To Moscow, Not Mecca: The Soviet Campaign Against Islam in Central Asia; 1917-1941 By Shoshana Keller; Greenwood Publishing Group, 2001
