= Supreme Electoral Council =

Supreme Electoral Council may refer to:

- The Supreme Electoral Council of Nicaragua (Spanish: Consejo Supremo Electoral, CSE)
- The Supreme Electoral Council of Northern Cyprus (Turkish: Yüksek Seçim Kurulu, YSK)
- The Supreme Electoral Council of Turkey (Turkish: Yüksek Seçim Kurulu, YSK)
