= Sobir Kamolov =

Soviet Uzbek politician (1910–1990)

Sobir Kamolovich Kamolov (Uzbek Cyrillic: Собир Камолович Камолов; Russian: Сабир Камалович Камалов, romanized: Sabir Kamalovich Kamalov; 2 May 1910 – 6 June 1990) was a Soviet politician. He served as the tenth First Secretary of the Communist Party of the Uzbek SSR from December 1957 until March 1959.

== Awards ==
- Three Order of Lenin (16 January 1950, 11 January 1957, ?)
- Two Order of the Red Banner of Labor (24 December 1944, ?)
- Order of the Red Star
- Three Order of the Badge of Honor

Party political offices
Preceded by Nuritdin Mukhitdinov	First Secretary of the Communist Party of the Uzbek SSR; 1957–1959	Succeeded by Sharof Rashidov
