= 1994–95 Uzbek parliamentary election =

Parliamentary elections were held in Uzbekistan on 25 December 1994, with a second round held in 39 constituencies on 8 January 1995 and seven constituencies on 22 January. The election was contested by 634 candidates, 250 nominated by local councils, 243 members of the People's Democratic Party of Uzbekistan, and 141 Progress of the Fatherland Party members. The majority of seats were won by local council nominees (around 120 of which were PDP members), whilst the People's Democratic Party emerged as the largest party.

Voter turnout was 94% in the first round.

== Results ==
Party	First round			Second round			Total seats
Party	Votes	%	Seats	Votes	%	Seats	Total seats
Local Council nominees			145			22	167
People's Democratic Party of Uzbekistan			54			15	69
Progress of the Fatherland Party			6			8	14
Total			205			45	250
Total votes	10,592,896	–					
Registered voters/turnout	11,248,464	94.17					
Source: Nohlen et al., CEC
