= Amin Niyazov =

Soviet and Uzbek politician

Amin Irmatovich Niyazov
- Амин Ирматович Ниязов
- Born: 7 November 1903; Fergana Oblast, Russian Empire
- Died: 26 December 1973; Tashkent, Soviet Union
- Occupation: Politician

Amin Irmatovich Niyazov (Russian: Амин Ирматович Ниязов, Uzbek: Amin Ermatovich Niyozov; 7 November 1903, Fergana Oblast – 26 December 1973, Tashkent) was a Soviet and Uzbek politician. He was the Chairman of the Presidium of the Supreme Soviet of the Uzbek SSR and First Secretary of the Central Committee of the Communist Party of Uzbekistan.

== Life ==
Niyazov was born the son of farmers. In 1919 he worked first for the nutritional committee in Fergana and then became secretary of the city committee of Fergana of Komsomol. In the 1920s, he worked for the Uzbek Cheka and was Head of Finance Department of Fergana Oblast. Niyazov joined the Communist Party in 1925. From 1930 to 1934 he studied at the Industrial Academy "J. V. Stalin". From 1935 he carried out various functions in business and party. From 1940 to 1946 he was People's Commissar of Finance of the Uzbek SSR and 1946/1947 Deputy Chairman of the Council of People's Commissars of the Uzbek SSR. From March 1947 to August 1950 Niyazov was finally chairman of the Presidium of the Supreme Soviet of the Uzbek SSR. From April 1950 Niyazov served as First Secretary of the Central Committee of the Communist Party of Uzbekistan. In December 1955, shortly after a visit of Nikolai Bulganin and Nikita Khrushchev, Niyazov was dismissed. Although no reasons were given, it was argued that Khrushchev blamed Niyazov for failing to increase cotton production. Between 1956 and 1957 he was Minister of Municipal Economy of the Uzbek SSR.

Niyazov was from October 1952 to February 1956 member of the Central Committee of the CPSU and from 1946 to 1958 a deputy of the Supreme Soviet of the Soviet Union.

He died on 26 December 1973.

== Awards and honors ==
- Two Order of Lenin
- Three Order of the Red Banner of Labour
- Two Order of the Red Star

== Sources ==
- Ниязов, Амин Ирматович. In: Большая советская энциклопедия. 2nd editio, Band 30. Moscow 1954, p. 44.
- Ниязов, Амин Ирматович. In: Константин Александрович Залесский: Империя Сталина. Биографический энциклопедический словарь. Вече, Moscow 2000, p. 337.
