= Progress of the Fatherland Party =

Progress of the Fatherland Party Vatan Taraqqiyoti Partiyasi
- Abbreviation: Vatan Tarakkiyoti; VTP
- Leader: Axtam Tursunov
- Founded: 20 March 1992
- Dissolved: 14 April 2000
- Split from: People's Democratic Party
- Merged into: Fidokorlar
- Headquarters: Tashkent
- Newspaper: Vatan
- Membership: 35,000
- Ideology: Social conservatism Progressivism; Economic liberalism Secularism; Anti-communism
- Political position: Centre-right
- Slogan: «Progress of the Fatherland is the progress of each of us!» (Uzbek: «Vatan taraqqiyoti - bu har birimizning taraqqiyotimiz!»)
- Anthem: State Anthem of Uzbekistan
- 1st Oliy Majlis: 14 / 250
- 2nd Oliy Majlis: 20 / 250

The Progress of the Fatherland Party (Uzbek: Vatan Taraqqiyoti Partiyasi) was a centre-right political party in Uzbekistan between 1992 and 2000. It served as the "constructive opposition" against the ruling People's Democratic Party of Uzbekistan.

== History ==
The party was founded by a group of activists on 20 March 1992, on the eve of the Navruz holiday, and was officially registered with the Ministry of Justice. The party's stated platform was for "the development of [the] economic and spiritual independence of Uzbekistan on the basis of a free market economy, to influence the step-by-step development and improvement of a democratic civil society, to protect the interests of the intelligentsia, entrepreneurs and dekhans, [and] to protect the interests and stimulate the development of private owners and promote their reliable protection.'

The party was one of two, along with the People's Democratic Party of Uzbekistan, to participate in independent Uzbekistan's first-ever parliamentary election in 1994–95. The Progress of the Fatherland Party (VTP) ran 141 candidates on a platform of pursuing "economic reforms at a faster pace." The VTP won 14 seats out of 250 in the unicameral Oliy Majlis, becoming the opposition and the third-largest parliamentary group and after "candidates of the local councils" (167 seats, none from the VTP) and the People's Democratic Party of Uzbekistan (69 seats). The party had over 35,000 members by the mid-1990s and had its own print organ, the Vatan newspaper; its own center for the study of public opinion; and an information and analytical center.

The 1999 parliamentary election saw three more parties win seats and the VTP drop to become the third-largest party despite increasing to 20 seats, behind "candidates of local councils" (110 seats), the People's Democratic Party of Uzbekistan (49 seats), and the Self-Sacrifice National Democratic Party (34 seats).

The leaderships of the VTP and the Self-Sacrifice National Democratic Party began negotiations in early 2000 on merging because of similar political views and ideology. At a joint congress of the two parties on 14 April 2000 in Tashkent, the Progress of the Fatherland Party merged into the Self-Sacrifice National Democratic Party, with former VTP leader Akhtam Tursunov becoming the leader of the unified party. The party would later merge into the Uzbekistan National Revival Democratic Party in 2007.
