= Unity (Uzbekistan) =

Political party in Uzbekistan

Unity Party Birlik partiyasi
- Leader: Abdurakhim Pulat
- Founded: 16 November 1988
- Registered: 23 August 2003
- Banned: 1994
- Newspaper: Birlik; Harakat
- Ideology: Conservative liberalism National liberalism Pan-Turkism
- Political position: Centre-right
- Colours: Blue
- Slogan: Kuch birlikda ("Strength Is in Unity")
- Legislative Chamber: 0 / 150

Website
- harakat.net

The Unity Party (Uzbek: Birlik partiyasi) is the main right-wing opposition officially unregistered political party in Uzbekistan since 1994. A conservative liberal party, it was founded in 1988 as a pro-independent movement in the Soviet Union (USSR) and has since promoted anti-communism, pan Turkism, secularism, and a civic nationalism of the Uzbeks.

Birlik has been under pressure from the Uzbek authorities; some activists are in prison and many members of the organization were forced to leave the country, with the organization not having conducted party and electoral activities since the 2000s.

== History ==
Birlik was founded on 16 November 1988 as a social movement and was named the "Birlik" People's Movement. The movement was founded by several representatives of the Uzbek intelligentsia and dissidents. The initial goal of the movement was to give the Uzbek language the status of the state language in the Uzbek SSR, since in fact the only official language of the republic was Russian, and Uzbek was considered a secondary language. The movement organized numerous rallies with this demand. On 21 October 1989, the movement achieved its demands, and the Uzbek language was recognized as the state language, along with Russian, of the Uzbek SSR. Since the end of 1989, the movement began to advocate for the independence of Uzbekistan from the USSR, for democratic reforms in the country.

In 1994, the movement failed to re-register with the Ministry of Justice and became illegal. Most of the leaders of the movement left Uzbekistan, the rest were arrested. In 1995, he held a congress in Moscow. On 26 August 2003, in the private house of one of the movement's activists in Kokand, an underground constituent congress of the Birlik party took place. Several activists of the movement in Uzbekistan directly participated in the congress, some members and activists came from abroad, and opposition leaders joined the congress via the Internet. The congress announced the transformation of the Birlik popular movement into the Birlik party. Abdurakhim Pulat was elected chairman of the party.

== See also ==
- Politics of Uzbekistan
