= Band of the Ministry of Defense of the Republic of Uzbekistan =

Band of the Ministry of Defense of Uzbekistan
- Orkestr O'zbekiston Respublikasi Mudofaa Vazirligi; Oркестр Ўзбекистон Республикаси Mудофаа Baзирлиги
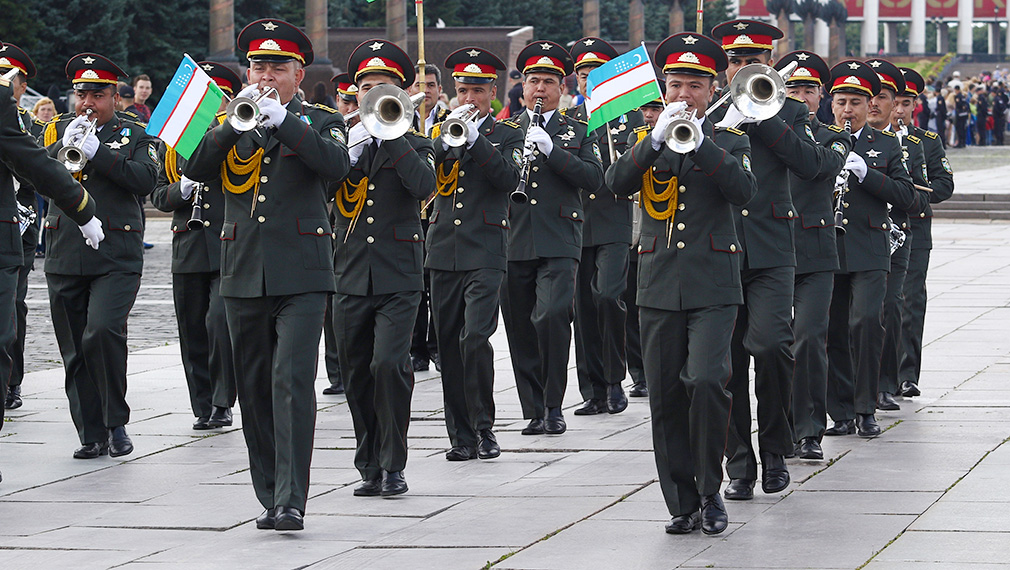
- The band during the Spasskaya Tower Military Music Festival and Tattoo in 2017.
- Active: 1992; 34 years ago
- Country: Uzbekistan
- Branch: Armed Forces of the Republic of Uzbekistan
- Type: Military Brass Band/Instructional Unit
- Part of: Ministry of Defense
- Headquarters: Victory Park Memorial Complex, Tashkent
- Nickname: Band of the Armed Forces

Commanders
- Senior Director: Colonel Pavel Makarov
- Director of the Separate Exemplary Band: Kasim Atamrzaev

Insignia
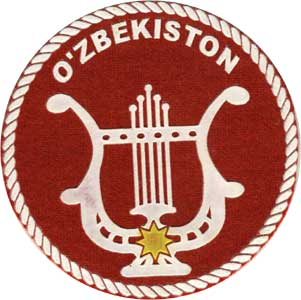
- Shoulder Patch

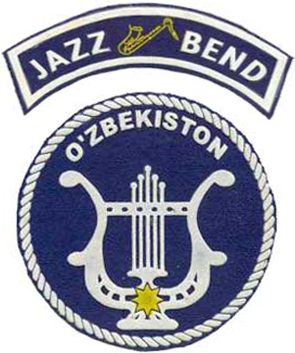
- Jazz Band Logo

The Band of the Ministry of Defense of the Republic of Uzbekistan (Uzbek: Orkestr O'zbekiston Respublikasi Mudofaa Vazirligi/Oркестр Ўзбекистон Республикаси Mудофаа Baзирлиги) is the central military band of the Armed Forces of the Republic of Uzbekistan based in Tashkent. It also serves as the organizational and instructional unit of the Uzbek defence ministry, presiding over all 30 military bands in Uzbekistan. It was founded in 1992 from the band of the Turkestan Military District.

== Activities ==
National anthem of Uzbekistan (instrumental)
The National anthem of Uzbekistan performed by the Band of the Ministry of Defense of the Republic of Uzbekistan in May 2017.

The military band accompanies the honor guard company in greeting foreign heads of state at the Kuksaroy Presidential Palace. It also takes part in official cultural and social events in the nation. These events include the celebrations of Independence Day of Uzbekistan, the Day of Remembrance and Honour, Defender of the Motherland Day.

The band has performed at Norfolk Naval Base, The Pentagon, the 13th Berlin and the 7th Cologne International Festivals of Military Bands, the Peace Horn International Music Festival in Beijing, as well as the Spasskaya Tower Military Music Festival for the first time.

== Composition ==
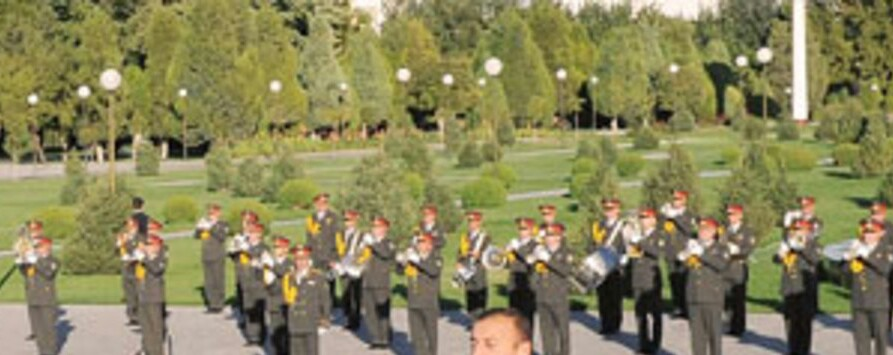
The Ceremonial Brass Band at the Monument to the Independence of Uzbekistan.

- Central Exemplary Band
  - Symphonic Band
  - Ceremonial Brass Band
  - Big Band
  - Corps of Drums

The band also holds precedence and presides over the following affiliated military bands:

- Band of the Tashkent Military District
- Band of the Northwest Military District
- Band of the Southwest Special Military District
- Band of the Central Military District
- Band of the Eastern Military District

== Bandleaders ==
- List of Senior Military Directors:
  - Colonel Yuri Saydjanov (1970-1975)
  - Colonel Revo Petrov (1975-1987)
  - Colonel Pavel Makarov (1987-1991) and (1991–Present)
- Band conductors
  - Lieutenant Colonel Roman Kvetny (2002-2005)
  - Sergeant Kasim Atamrzaev

=== Pavel Makarov ===
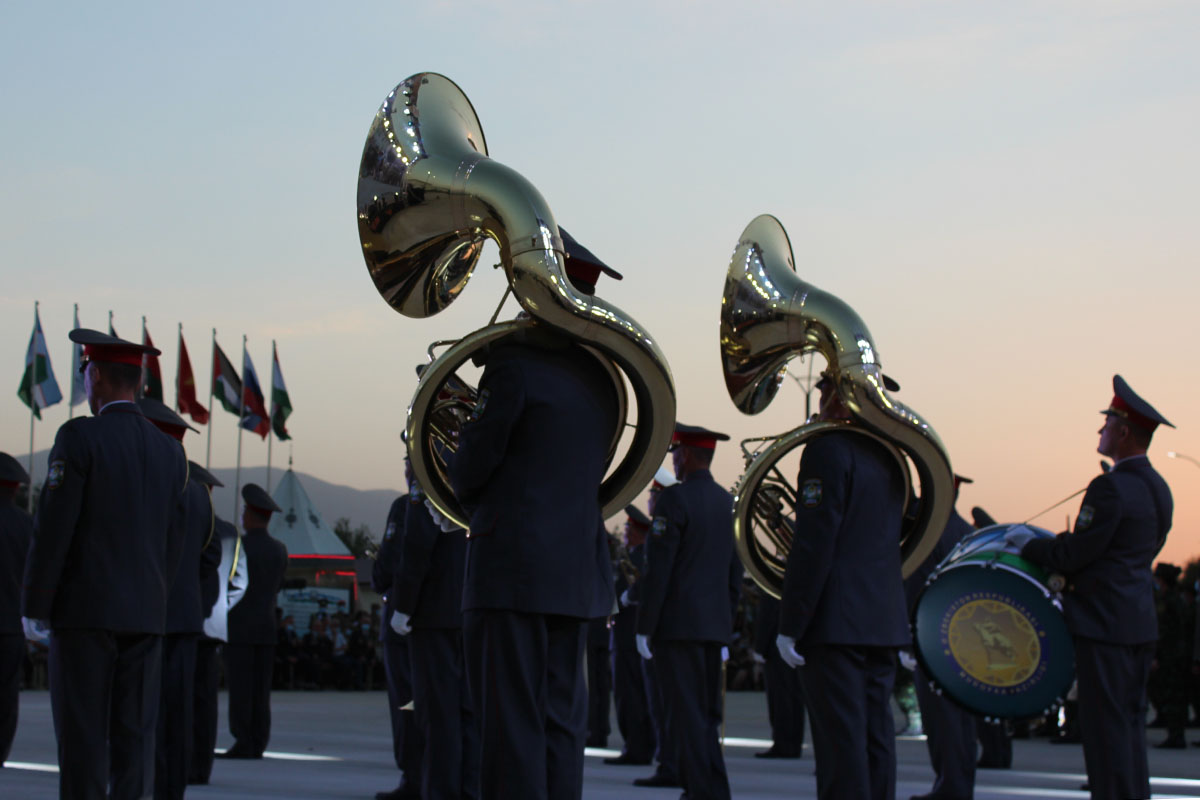
The band performing in the evening.

Colonel Pavel Leontyevich Makarov (Russian: Павел Леонтьевич Макаров) is the current director of the band. He was born on 30 May 1949 in Tashkent, the then capital of the Uzbek Soviet Socialist Republic. From 1972 to 1977, he studied at the Faculty of Military Exercise at the Moscow Conservatory. From 1977 to 1982 he served in the Group of Soviet Forces in Germany. From 1982 to 1991, he held various positions in the Staff Band of the Turkestan Military District. He was later promoted to the post of senior director in 1987. Since 1991, Makarov has been the senior Band of the Ministry of Defense of the Republic of Uzbekistan. Many of the band's marches were composed by him (the Armed Forces March, the Amir Temur March, the Guards March, Vatan, etc.). He holds the honorary title of "Honored Art Worker of Uzbekistan" and holder of the Dost'lik (Friendship) Order.

== See also ==
- Military Band Service of the Armed Forces of Turkmenistan
- Military Band Service (Kazakhstan)
- Band of the General Staff of the Armed Forces of Kyrgyzstan
- Military Brass Band of the Commandant Regiment of the Ministry of Defense of Tajikistan

== Videos ==
- The band in the Spasskaya Tower Music Festival in 2017.
- A 2005 Concert in Tashkent
- A Rehearsal Before Their Performance on Red Square
- Concert in Honor Colonel Pavel Makarov's 60th birthday
- A Military Patriotic Music Festival in Tashkent
