= University of Military Security and Defense of Uzbekistan =

Military academy in Tashkent, Uzbekistan

Coordinates: 41.31787°N 69.30882°E

- Harbiy xavfsizlik va mudofaa universiteti
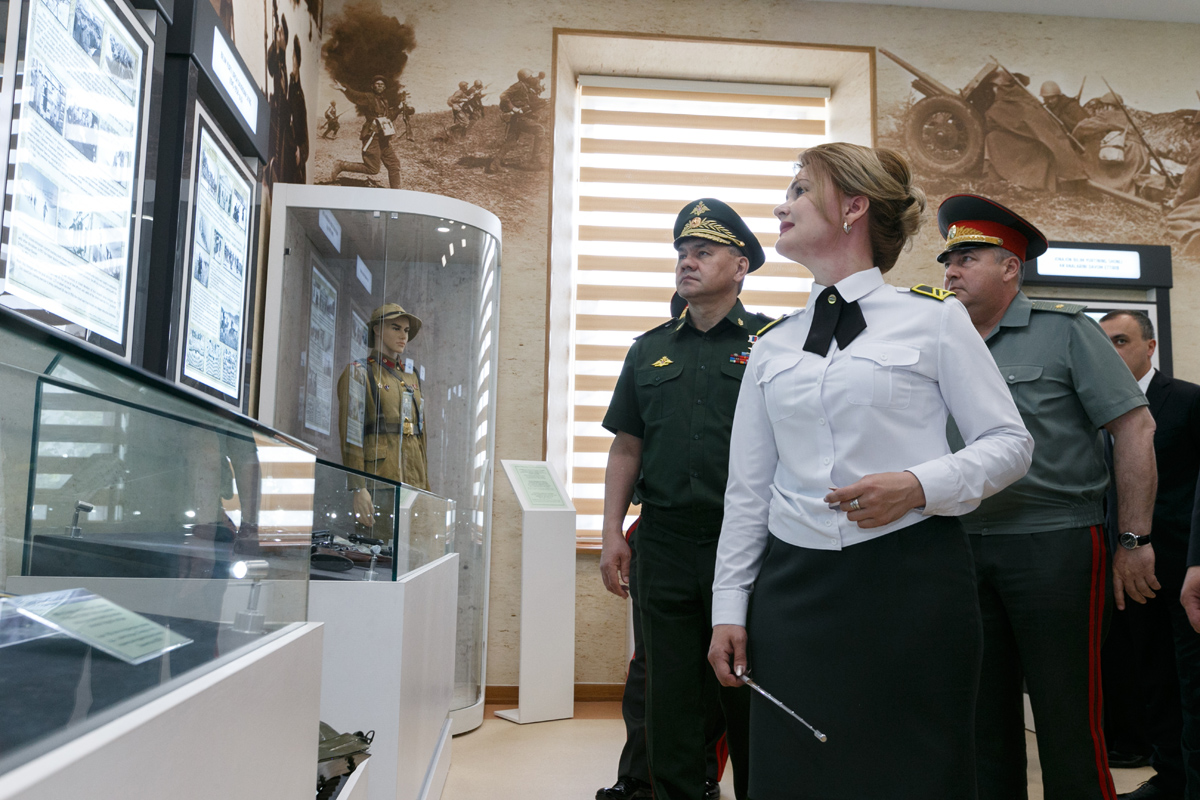
- Sergey Shoigu at the academy of the armed forces in 2018
- Type: military academy
- Established: July 29, 2025; 15 months ago
- Founder: Government of Uzbekistan
- Affiliations: Armed Forces of the Republic of Uzbekistan
- Rector: Lieutenant General Shukhrat Kholmukhamedov
- Location: 100075 Parkent Street, Mirzo Ulugbek, Tashkent, Tashkent Region, Uzbekistan
- Language: Uzbek
- Colors: Light Blue
- Website: akad.uz

The University of Military Security and Defense of Uzbekistan (Uzbek: Harbiy xavfsizlik va mudofaa universiteti) s the premier higher military educational institution and a body for the training of highly qualified military personnel for the Armed Forces of Uzbekistan. It was originally established as an inter-service educational institution that serves the purpose of training officers for higher level leadership positions.

== History ==
=== Origins ===
==== Academy of the Armed Forces ====
The immediate predecessor institution was the Academy of the Armed Forces of Uzbekistan (Uzbek: Oʻzbekiston respublikasi qurolli kuchlari akademiyasi). It was established on 2 September 1994 in accordance with the resolution of the Cabinet of Ministers of the Republic of Uzbekistan "On Establishment of the Academy of Armed Forces of the Republic of Uzbekistan" of 15 August 1994. It was the first institution of its kind to be established on the militaries of Central Asia. In January 2017, President Shavkat Mirziyoyev visited the school to give instructions on the organization of an entirely new academy on its basis. While addressing the school administration, noted the importance reestablishing the academy, stating the following:

"It will take a truly major place in the unified system of military education in the Uzbek military"

The reorganization resolution was adopted by presidential decree on 25 April 2017. The academy had 3 faculties:

- General Staff Faculty
- Command - Staff Faculty
- Faculty of Advanced Training

Graduates of the General Staff Faculty of the Armed Forces Academy are awarded the rank of lieutenant, a diploma of higher education and a driver's license. The General Staff Faculty of the Armed Forces Academy trains officers in the following specialties:

- Motorized Rifleman and Border Troops Commander (4 years)
- Officers of tactical command of educational and ideological work (4 years)
- Army Intelligence Tactical Command Officers (4 years)
- Officers of the Front Tactical Command (4 years)
- Chemical Tactical Command Officers (4 years)
- Engineer Tactical Command Officers (4 years)

In late 2017, the Uzbek government signed an agreement with China on cooperation between the school and educational institutions in the PLA. Around the same time, former defense minister Qobul Berdiyev became rector of the academy. In May 2018, Russian defense minister Sergey Shoygu inspected the historical halls of the academy.

=== Establishment of the university ===
Following an order issued by the National Security Council under the President of Uzbekistan on February 21, 2025, the Ministry of Defense conducted a comparative study of higher military training frameworks across more than 20 foreign states. As a result, on July 29, 2025, President Shavkat Mirziyoyev officially authorized the dissolution of the Academy of the Armed Forces of Uzbekistan and the establishment of the University of Military Security and Defense on its basis.

== Functions ==
The academy serves all branches of the armed forces, rather than just the Uzbek Ground Forces. Cadets in the academy specialize in the highest command of the military, scientific studies, as well as operational experience for senior officers, studying the problems of military science in order to increase professional and qualitative training of officers and to explore practical issues of military policy and the development of the armed forces. Teachers are commissioned officers in the Ministry of Defense, as well as retired military personnel, and experts leading higher education institutions.

== Academics ==
Cadets who study at the academy are enrolled for at least 2 years. The school requires all cadets to be fluent in the Uzbek language as well as have a basic knowledge of Russian. The university offers dual education system frameworks where graduates can simultaneously receive nationally accredited civilian bachelor degrees alongside their officer commissions. Additionally, the university implemented a transfer mechanism allowing civilian students in their second undergraduate year at regional universities to apply to complete their remaining two years at the university.

== Structure ==
=== Constituent Institutes ===
- Land Forces Institute
- Military Aviation Institute
- Military Medical Academy
- Military Institute of Information and Communication Technologies and Communications
- Chirchiq Higher Tank Command and Engineering School
- Samarkand Higher Military Automobile Command School

=== Specialized Centers ===
- Higher School for the Training of Sergeants
- Center for the Training of Aviation and UAV Specialists

== Rectors ==
- Vladimir Makhmudov (circa 1995)
- Kadyr Gulyamov (1999 - 2000)
- Shavkat Normatov (2012 - 2013)
- Qobul Berdiyev (4 September 2017 - 1 May 2018)
- Colonel Shavkat Mamazhonov (since 23 March 2021)

== Alumni ==
- Colonel Zoirjon Bozorboev, Deputy Defense Minister for Logistics
- Colonel Farhodjon Shermatov, Commander of the Northwest Military District
- Colonel Ulugbek Dusmatov, Deputy Commander for Educational and Ideological Work of the Northwest Military District
- Bakhodir Tashmatov, Commander of the Uzbekistan National Guard
- Shukhrat Kholmukhamedov, former Chief of the General Staff
