= Rustam Akhmedov =

Uzbek general (1943–2025)

- Rustam Ahmedov

Minister of Defense
- In office September 6, 1991 – September 29, 1997
- President: Islam Karimov
- Preceded by: Post established
- Succeeded by: Hikmatulla Tursunov

Ministry of Emergency Situations
- In office September 29, 1997 – 2000
- President: Islam Karimov
- Preceded by: Ismail Jurabekov
- Succeeded by: Bakhodir Kosimov

Personal details
- Born: Rustam Urmanovich Akhmedov; 10 November 1943 Bag‘dod District, Fergana Region, Uzbek SSR, USSR
- Died: 12 October 2025 (aged 81) Tashkent, Uzbekistan

Military service
- Allegiance: Soviet Union; Uzbekistan
- Rank: Colonel General
- Education: Tashkent Higher Tank Command School

Rustam Urmanovich Akhmedov (Uzbek: Rustam Oʻrmanovich Ahmedov, Russian: Рустам Урманович Ахметов; 10 November 1943 – 12 October 2025) was an Uzbek military officer who was the first person to hold the post of Minister of Defence of Uzbekistan from 6 September 1991 to 29 September 1997.

== Early life and career ==
Akhmedov was born in the Bag‘dod District of the Uzbek Soviet Socialist Republic on 10 November 1943. By the time he was a young adult, he was studying at the Kokand Technical School of Mechanization with a major in electrification and agriculture. After graduation, he worked as a mechanic for the Akhunbabaevsky regional association "Uzselkhoztekhnika" for about a year. He began his military service by studying as a cadet at the Tashkent Higher Tank Command School from 1962 to 1965. From 1965 to 1969, he served in the Baltic Military District (which comprises the Baltic republics of Estonia, Latvia, and Lithuania) where he was a commander of a tank platoon while concurrently acting as secretary of the Komsomol committee of an artillery regiment (beginning in 1966). In 1969, he was transferred to the Northern Group of Forces in the Polish People's Republic, where he did administrative political work for the local Komsomol.

In 1972, he was sent to the Samarkand Higher Tank Command School, which was transformed in 1974 into an automobile school. For the rest of the decade, Akhmedov served in various regiments in Soviet Uzbekistan and the Turkestan Military District. In 1985, he graduated from the Malinovsky Military Armored Forces Academy. In December 1986, he was appointed Chief of Staff the Civil Defense of the Tashkent Region. That same year, Akhmedov was elected a member of the Tashkent regional council.

On 10 September 1991, by the decree of newly elected President Islam Karimov, Akhmedov was appointed Minister of Defense of the Republic of Uzbekistan. The post of defence minister, which had been established only four days prior to his appointment, had never been filled before, making him the first to hold such a position. His role became effective as of 3 July 1992, when development of the ministry concluded. According to V. Ponomarev, a close associate of Colonel Akhmedov, the appointment came as a "complete surprise" due to his belief that the country has "generals who are no less worthy to take this position". The appointment of Akhmedov also caused skepticism from Russian-speaking officers of the Uzbek army due to his lack of authority among his subordinates.

In January 1992, on the basis of units of the Ministry of Internal Affairs of the Republic, he ordered that the Uzbekistan National Guard be formed, which would be subordinated directly to his office as Minister of Defense. On 29 September 1997, he was removed from his post in the Defense Ministry to serve as Minister of Emergency Situations, a position he would serve in before retiring in 2000.

== Personal life and death ==
Akhmedov was married and had four children (three daughters and a son). His wife worked as a doctor. In 2015, it was reported that Akhmedov was placed in an intensive care unit. On his 75th birthday in 2018, he was awarded the Dustlik Order by President Shavkat Mirziyoyev and was honored at a ceremony held at the State Museum of the Armed Forces hosted by Abdusalom Azizov. The ceremony was also attended by his former colleagues from the CIS countries.

Akhmedov died on 12 October 2025, at the age of 81.

== Awards ==
- Certificate of Merit of Uzbekistan (1993)
- Shon-Sharaf Order, 2nd degree (1995)
- Dustlik Order (2018)
