= Bakhodir Kurbanov =

Bakhodir Kurbanov may refer to:

- Bakhodir Kurbanov (wrestler)
- Bakhodir Kurbanov (general)
