= Tashkent Higher All-Arms Command School =

Coordinates: 41.3201°N 69.3065°E

- Ташкентское высшее общевойсковое командное училище
- Former names: Tashkent Higher Combined Arms Command School named after Vladimir Lenin
- Motto: Слава Ленинцам Всех Времен
- Motto in English: Long live Lenintsy of All Generations
- Type: military academy
- Active: 12 July 1918–25 April 2017
- Founders: Soviet Government
- Affiliations: Armed Forces of the Republic of Uzbekistan
- School Accronym: TVOKU; TOUQBY
- Location: Tashkent, Tashkent Region, Uzbekistan (formerly the Uzbek SSR)
- Language: Russian/Uzbek

The Tashkent Higher All-Arms Command School (Uzbek: Тошкент Олий Умумқўшин Қўмондонлик билим Юрти, ТОУКБЮ) was a military academy of the Ministry of Defense of Uzbekistan. It was previously known as the Tashkent Higher Combined Arms Command School named after Vladimir Lenin (Russian: Ташкентское Высшее Общевойсковое Командное Училище имени В.И. Ленина, ТВОКУ). It was one of the oldest military establishments of the USSR preparing infantry officers for the Soviet Army. The school was disbanded after former Uzbek SSR gained independence in 1991 and became the Republic of Uzbekistan. The last banner of the school was removed from the No. 1 Guard Post and deposited into the State Museum of the Armed Forces of Uzbekistan.

== History ==
TVOKU, or as it was called colloquially, the Leninsky College was founded on July 12, 1918, when the Military Commissariat of the Turkestan Soviet Republic ordered the government to organize the Turkestan Soviet command courses in Central Asia for the training of Bolshevik commanders. On the 31st of that month, it was announced that a command school would be created in Tashkent. On September 17, 1918, the school began regular classes, which had their own ceremonial opening 5 days later. At the time, the basis of training was political indoctrination and immersion in military subjects, with tactical training being given particular attention. During the Great Patriotic War (known in the West as the Second World War), the school prepared about 8,000 commanders to fight in the Red Army against the Wehrmacht. Many who graduated at the time fought in the Eastern Front, including in the Battle of Moscow in 1941 and the Siege of Leningrad in 1943.

On March 28, 1957, the banners of the school, which were previously stored in the Central Museum of the Soviet Army, were delivered to the school from Moscow. By July 1970, the school was exporting its students to other Soviet universities, as well as importing cadets from other cadet schools, which would later make up the 1st Cadet Battalion. In the 80s, graduates of the school were immediately commissioned into the Soviet Army and transferred across the Afghan border with the Uzbek SSR to participate in the Soviet–Afghan War. On 26 March 1993, it was reestablished by the Ministry of Defense of Uzbekistan as the Tashkent Higher All-Arms Command School. In 2017, President Shavkat Mirziyoyev, ordered that the school be reestablished as the Academy of the Armed Forces of Uzbekistan.

== Alumni ==
- Qobul Berdiyev, Uzbek military officer who formerly served as Minister of Defence of Uzbekistan.
- Stanislav Hazheev, former Minister of Defence in Transnistria.
- Albert Makashov, a Russian officer and a nationalist-communist politician.
- Pavel Pavlovich Kozlovsky, the second Minister of Defence of Belarus.
- Esen Topoev, former Minister of Defense of Kyrgyzstan.
- Valdas Tutkus, a Lithuanian general who was the 3rd Chief of Defence.
- Ilýa Weljanow, Turkmen general and diplomat.

== Links ==
- Media related to Tashkent Higher All-Arms Command School at Wikimedia Commons
- Alumni Website
- ТВОКУ 100 лет
