= Zainobiddin Iminov =

Major general Zainobiddin Ruzievich Iminov (Uzbek: Zaynobiddin Ro'zievich Iminov) is an Uzbekistani major general who serves as the current Chief of the General Staff of the Armed Forces of Uzbekistan, having been appointed to the post on 23 November 2024.

== Military career ==
Iminov previously served as Commander of the Southwest Special Military District, headquartered in Qarshi. During this period, he co-led joint military exercises between the Uzbek Armed Forces and the Tajik National Army alongside his Tajik counterpart. On Defender of the Motherland Day in 2021, he was awarded the Order of Friendship. On 23 November 2024, Iminov was appointed Chief of the General Staff, succeeding Shukhrat Kholmukhamedov, who became the country's defence minister.
