= Israel–Uzbekistan relations =

- Israel: Uzbekistan

Israel–Uzbekistan relations are the bilateral relations between Israel and Uzbekistan.

Israel and Uzbekistan established relations on 21 February 1992.

In May 1992, Israel opened its embassy in Tashkent. In March 1997, Uzbekistan opened its embassy in Tel Aviv.

== History ==
After the collapse of the Soviet Union in 1991, and Uzbekistan gained independence, Israel and Uzbekistan established relations on 21 February 1992. In May 1992, Israel opened its embassy in Uzbekistan, and in March 1997, Uzbekistan opened its embassy in Israel. The former Israeli Minister of Foreign Affairs Shimon Peres visited Uzbekistan in 1994. In 1994 Israel and Uzbekistan have signed an agreement in the field of tourism which entered into force in 1995. On 3 July 1994, Israel and Uzbekistan have signed an agreement on promotion and protection of investments which entered into force on 17 February 1997, and on 15 September 1998 an agreement on avidness of double taxation which entered into force on 31 December 2000. In 1997, Israel and Uzbekistan have signed an agreement on cooperation in the fields of culture, science, and education which entered into force in the same year, and in 1998 Israel and Uzbekistan have signed an agreement on trade and economic cooperation which entered into force in 1999. The first state visit was on September 14–16, 1998 the first President of Uzbekistan Islam Karimov visited Israel.

In 2022, the Israeli embassy in Uzbekistan unveiled in the Victory Park of Tashkent a monument to honor the Uzbeks who assisted Jewish refugees during the second world war.

== Economic relations ==
In 2024, Israel has ratified Uzbekistan's application to join the World Trade Organization.

Uzbek - Israeli trade in millions USD-$
	Israel imports Uzbekistan exports	Uzbekistan imports Israel exports	Total trade value
2023	6	29	35
2022	10.5	25.3	35.8
2021	3	12.8	15.8
2020	1.4	22.6	24
2019	1.6	18.5	20.1
2018	1.6	29.3	30.9
2017	2.4	17.1	19.5
2016	0.3	13.3	13.6
2015	1.2	15.3	16.5
2014	1.2	38.2	39.4
2013	1	27.8	28.8
2012	2.2	13	15.2
2011	4	19.7	23.7
2010	3.3	37.2	40.5
2009	0.4	20.7	21.1
2008	2.7	23.3	26
2007	2	25.6	27.6
2006	1.2	12.2	13.4
2005	1.3	6.2	7.5
2004	1.2	9.9	11.1
2003	1.8	6.3	8.1
2002	3	38.1	41.1

== Tourism ==
Uzbekistan Airways has flown between Tel Aviv and Tashkent since 1992. In 2018, about 10,000 Israelis visited Uzbekistan. In 2017, about 2,500 Israelis visited Uzbekistan.

== Jewish community ==
The Jewish population of Uzbekistan is about 13,000, including 3,000 Bukharan Jews. Most of the Jews live in Tashkent, about 8,000 Jews. Some groups remain in Samarkand, Bukhara, Fergana and Andijan.

== Pegasus spyware ==
In April 2025, Uzbekistan was publicly identified for the first time as a user of Pegasus spyware, a surveillance tool developed by the Israeli company NSO Group. The disclosure came during a U.S. court hearing in a lawsuit filed by WhatsApp, which accused NSO of exploiting a vulnerability in its platform to target approximately 1,400 individuals in 2019. Among the eight governments reportedly using Pegasus at the time, only Mexico, Saudi Arabia, and Uzbekistan were named in court. The spyware, capable of covertly accessing messages, calls, and device functions, has been linked to the surveillance of journalists, activists, and civil society members. NSO Group claims it licenses Pegasus only to government clients approved by Israel for lawful use, such as counterterrorism, though critics argue it has facilitated repression.

== See also ==
- Foreign relations of Israel
- Foreign relations of Uzbekistan
