= Military ranks of Uzbekistan =

The Military ranks of Uzbekistan are the military insignia used by the Armed Forces of the Republic of Uzbekistan.

== Commissioned officer ranks ==
The rank insignia of commissioned officers.

Rank group	General / flag officers				Senior officers			Junior officers
Uzbek Ground Forces
Uzbek Ground Forces	Armiya generali	General-polkovnik	General-leytenant	General-mayor	Polkovnik	Podpolkovnik	Mayor	Kapitan	Katta leytenant	Leytenant
Uzbek River Force
Uzbek River Force					I rang kapitani	II rang kapitani	III rang kapitani	Kapitan-leytenant	Katta leytenant	Leytenant
Uzbekistan Air and Air Defence Forces
Uzbekistan Air and Air Defence Forces		General-polkovnik	General-leytenant	General-mayor	Polkovnik	Podpolkovnik	Mayor	Kapitan	Katta leytenant	Leytenant
Rank group	General / flag officers				Senior officers			Junior officers

== Other ranks ==
The rank insignia of non-commissioned officers and enlisted personnel.

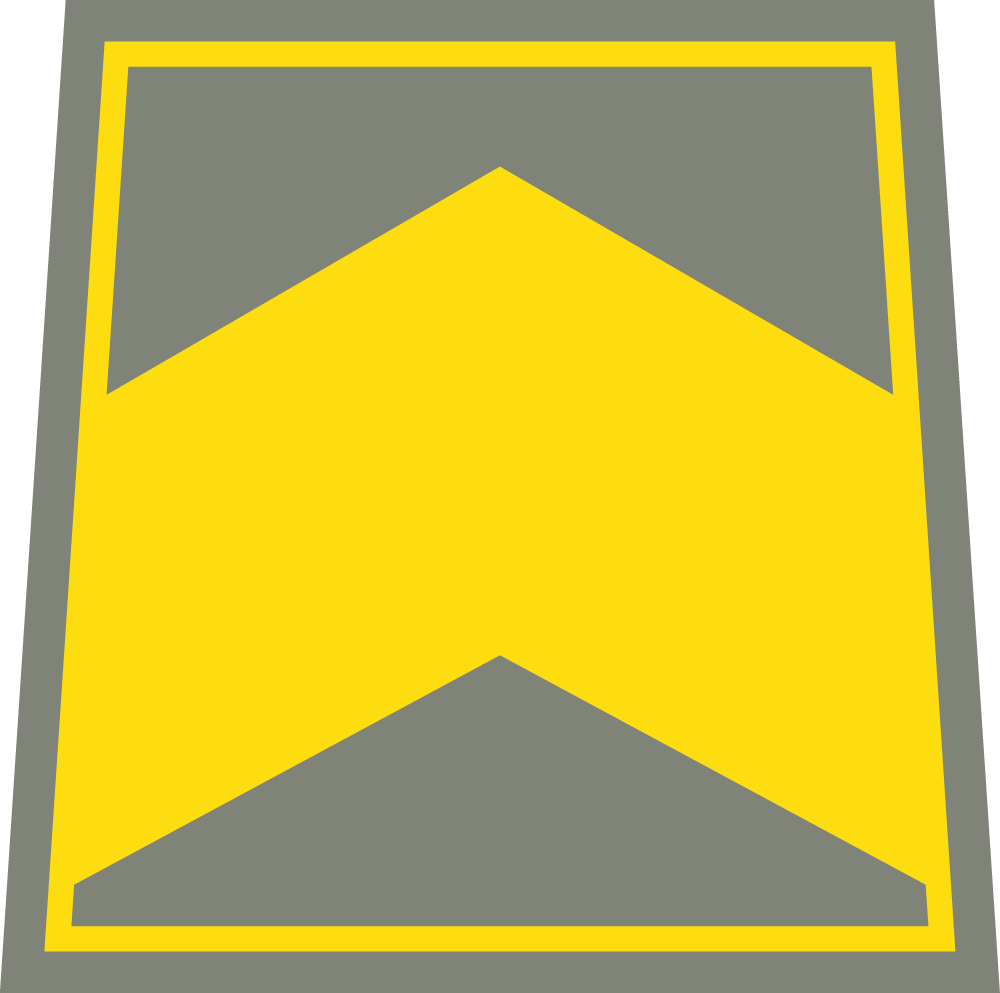
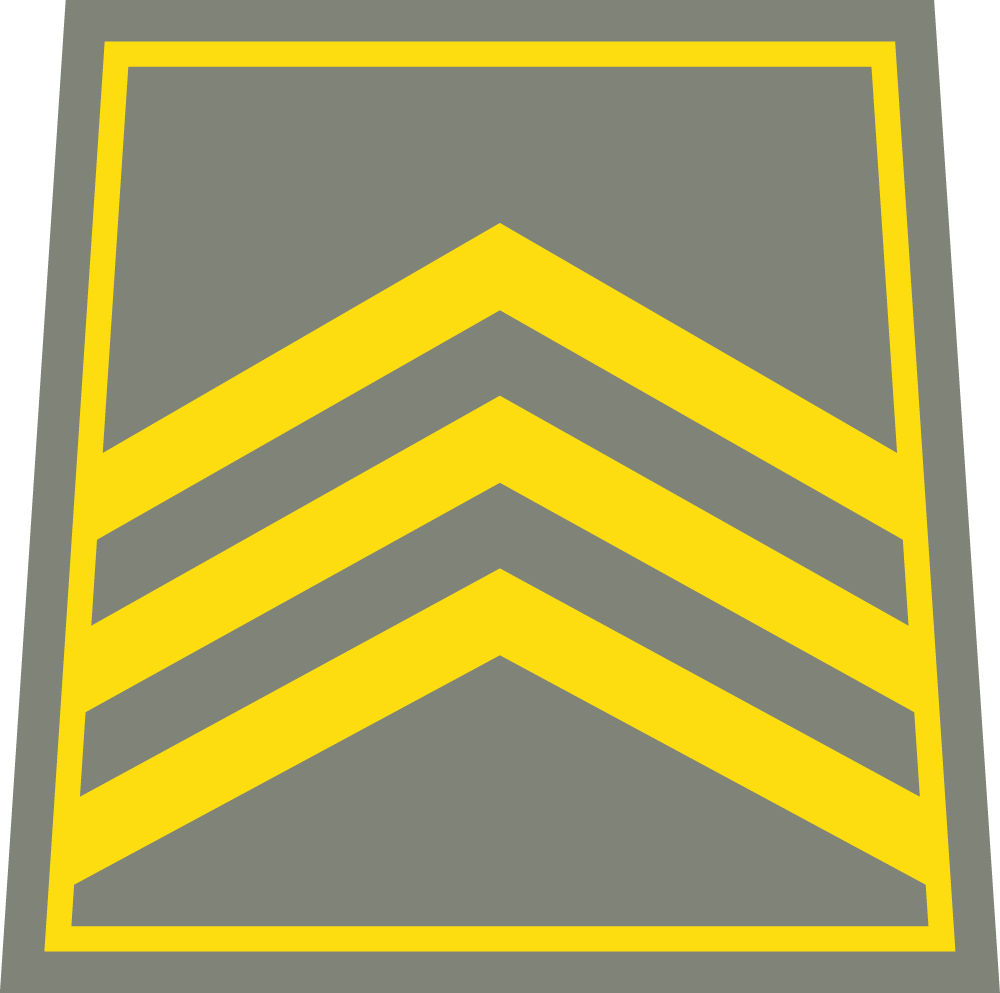
Rank group	Senior NCOs					Junior NCOs	Enlisted
Uzbek Ground Forces
Uzbek Ground Forces	Katta serjant	I darajali serjant	II darajali serjant	III darajali serjant	Kichik serjant		Oddiy askar
Uzbek River Force
Uzbek River Force	Bosh starshina	I darajali starshina	II darajali starshina	III darajali starshina	Starshina		Matros
Uzbek Air Defense Forces and Air Force
Uzbek Air Defense Forces and Air Force	Katta serjant	I darajali serjant	II darajali serjant	III darajali serjant	Kichik serjant		Oddiy askar
Rank group	Senior NCOs					Junior NCOs	Enlisted
