= Victory Park, Tashkent =

Coordinates: 41.3547°N 69.2233°E

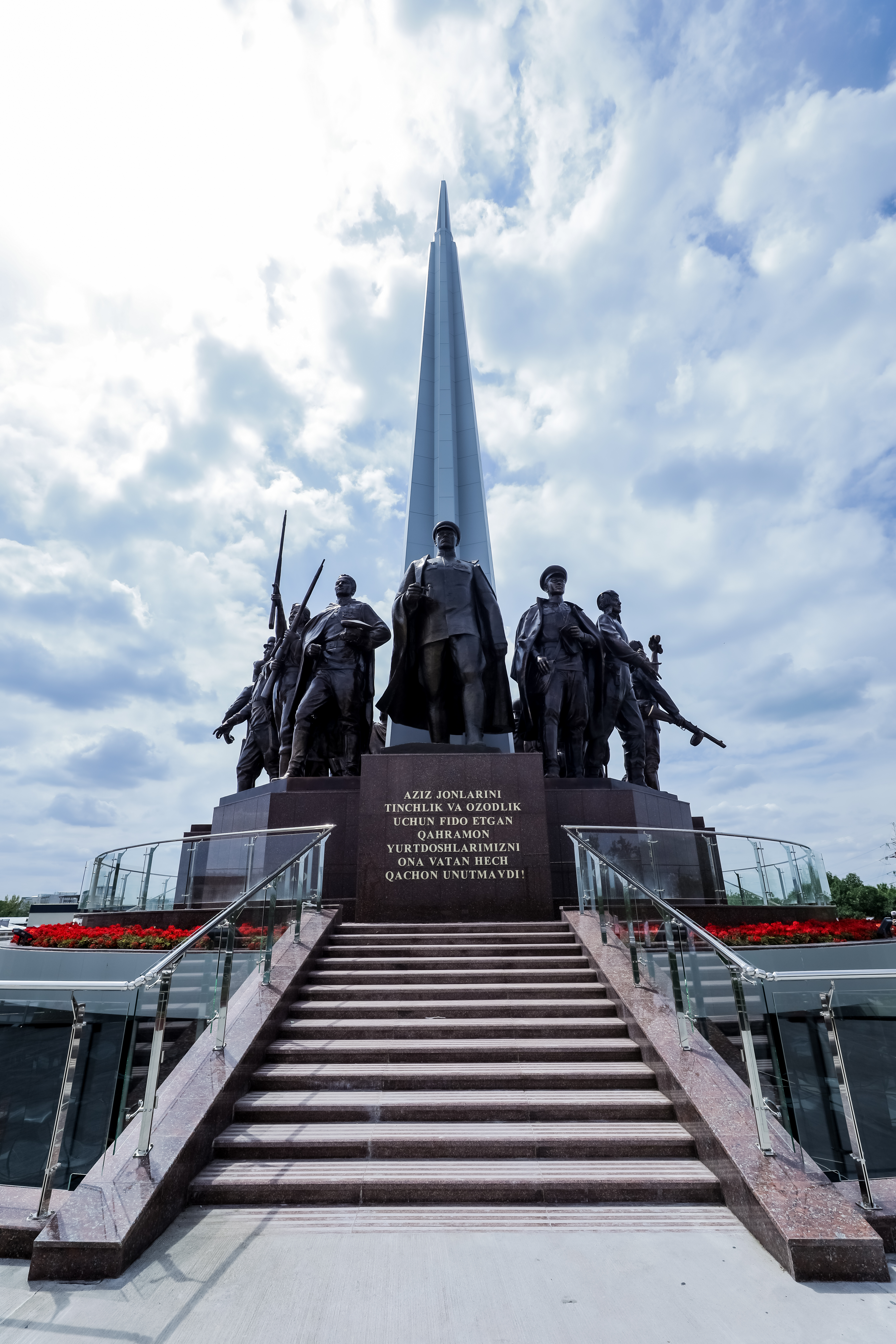
The central monument of the park.

Victory Park (Uzbek: G'alaba bog'i; Russian: Парк Победы), also known as the Victory Park Memorial Complex, is a park located in Tashkent, the capital of Uzbekistan. It was planned in honor of the 75th anniversary of the end of the Second World War.

== Background ==
The project was announced by President Shavkat Mirziyoyev in a holiday address on Victory Day in 2019. When describing the park, he said that it will be the "practical embodiment of our admiration for the people's feat in that cruel war." It was also conceived during a visit by Russian president Vladimir Putin to Tashkent in October 2018. The Ministry of Defense, the Ministry of Culture and the Academy of Sciences of Uzbekistan worked on the creation of the park as a joint project. The park was officially opened on 9 May 2020 with full military honors.

== Memorial complex ==
Buildings such as a "Museum of Glory" were erected on the park's territory while designs such as an entrance arch were being installed. Historical memorabilia such as emblems, war flags and maps were added to the architectural ensemble of the park.

In 2022, the Embassy of Israel unveiled in the park a monument to honor the Uzbeks who assisted Jewish refugees during the war.

=== Ode to Fortitude ===
The Ode to Fortitude monument was erected in memory of Zulfiya Zakirova, an Uzbek mother who lost five sons during the war. The monument is located in the center of the park.

=== Museum of Glory ===
The Museum of Glory.

The Museum of Glory (Uzbek: «Шон-шараф» музейи) or Shon-Sharaf State Museum in the park is erected in the form of a man-made mound, inside which is located the main pavilion of the park is an exhibition dedicated to the history of Uzbekistan's participation in World War II. The museum consists of six departments. All accompanying information about the exhibits is presented in Uzbek, Russian and English. The museum has more than 12.5 thousand artifacts. Separate sections dedicated to ministries and departments within the Armed Forces are organized. It is part of the Victory Park Memorial Complex, the head of which is an advisor to the Minister of Defense for Culture.

== Particularities ==
In September 2020, a resolution of the President "On measures to organize the activities of the Victory Park Memorial Complex" was adopted, according to which, the activities of the Victory Park Memorial Complex are organized under the Ministry of Defense. With this being the case, the complex is classified as a state institution and a legal entity. As such, it has its own development fund. The head of the complex considered to be a special advisor to the Minister of Defense is appointed and dismissed by the Minister of Defense in agreement with the Minister of Culture.

The Center for Spirituality and Enlightenment, the Department of Information and Mass Communications, the Military Band Service and the Central Song and Dance Ensemble of the Armed Forces are located on the territory of the Complex.

== Gallery ==
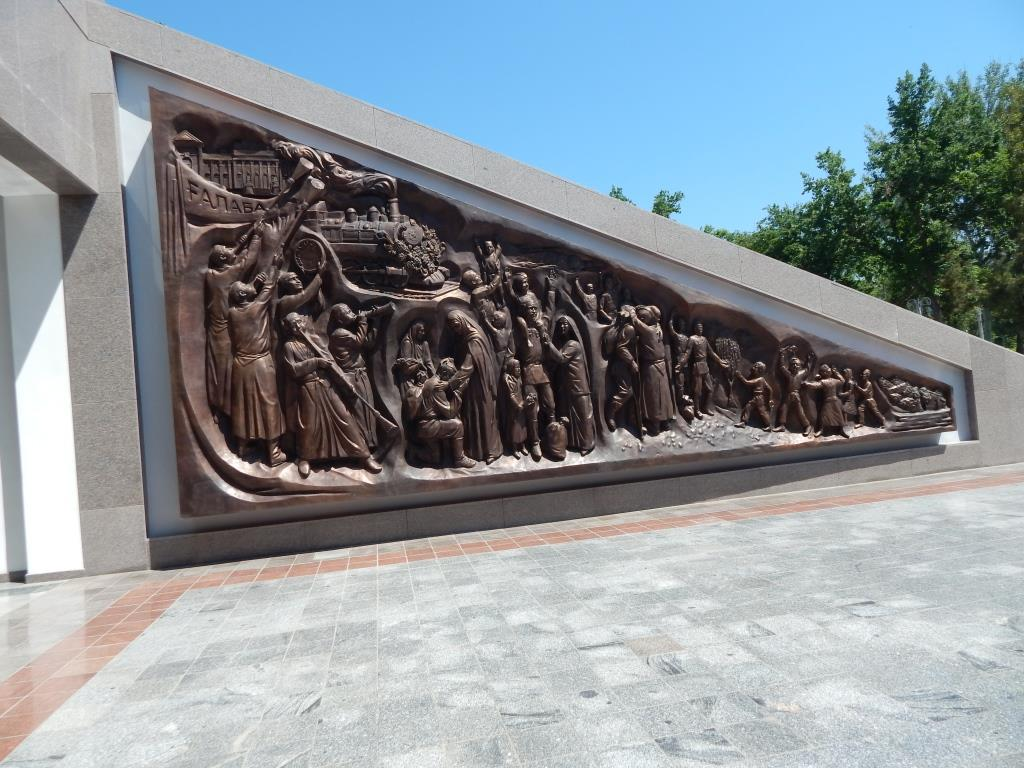
Victory Museum

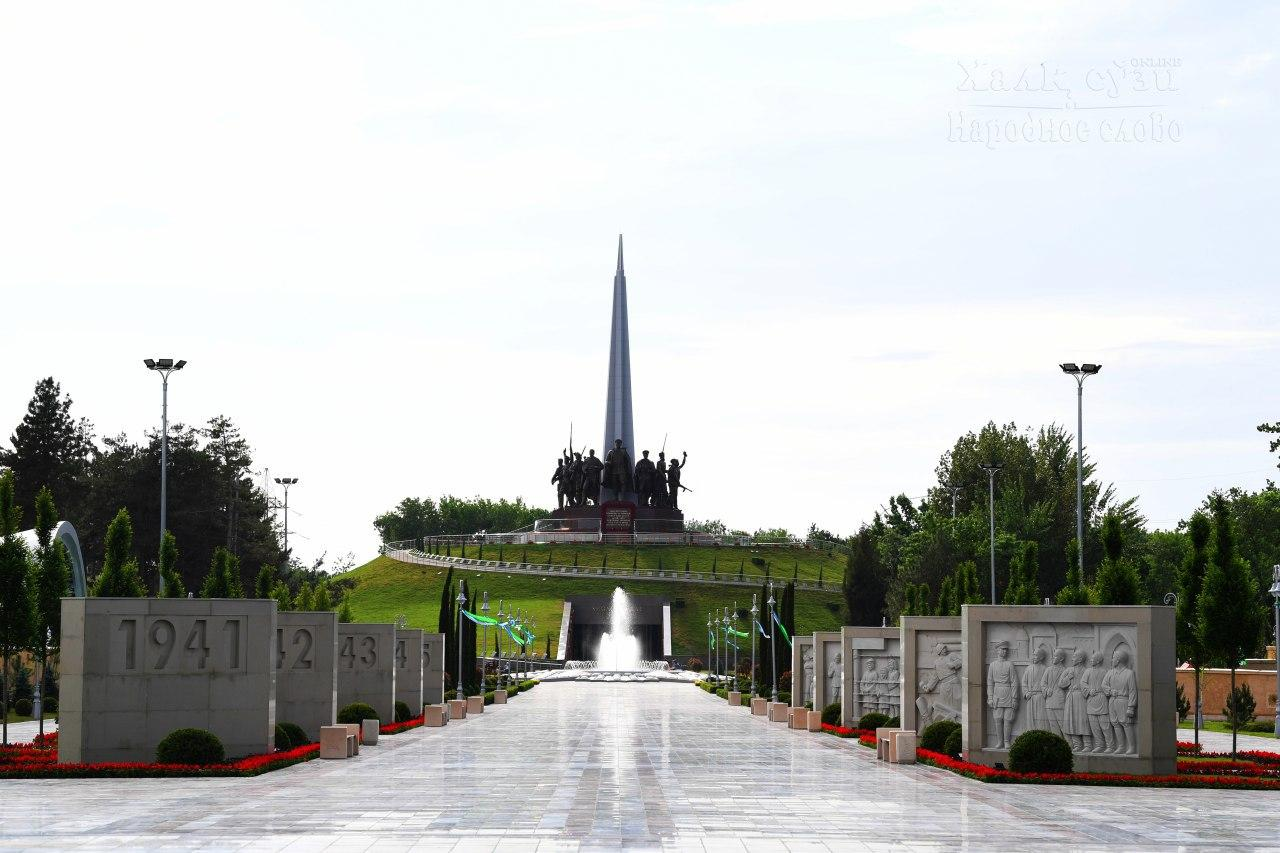
Main square of Victory Park

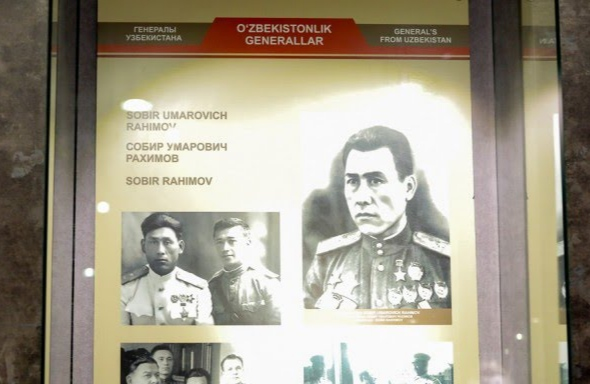
Sobir Rakhimov

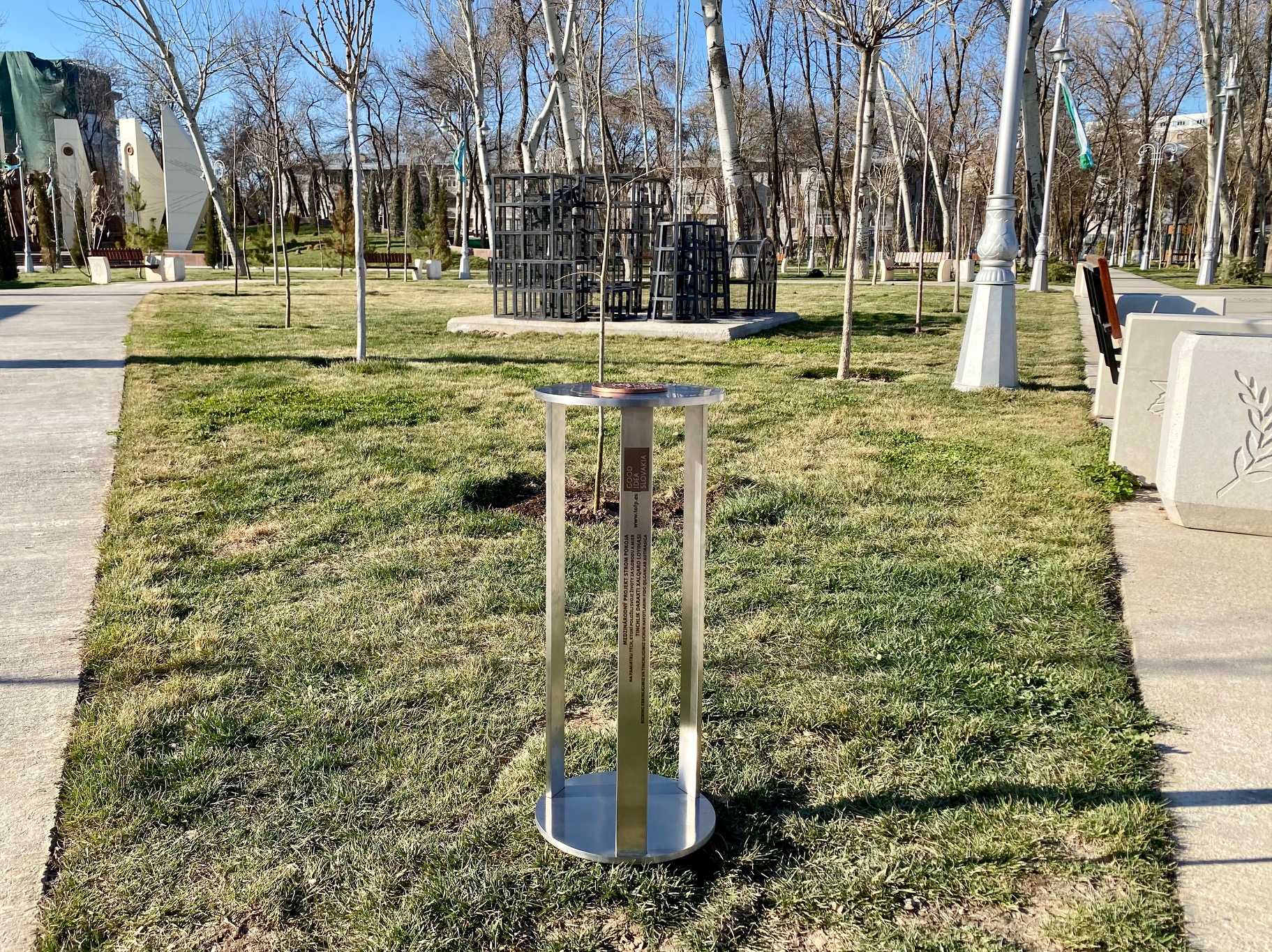
Tree of Peace memorial
