= State Museum of the Armed Forces of Uzbekistan =

Coordinates: 41°19′53.3″N 69°20′1.2″E

- Uzbek: Oʻzbekiston Respublikasi Qurolli Kuchlari markaziy muzeyi
- Former name: Museum of the Turkestan Military District
- Established: 1965
- Location: Tashkent
- Type: Museum of military history
- Collection size: 8,000
- Founder: Government of Uzbekistan

The State Museum of the Armed Forces of Uzbekistan (Uzbek: Oʻzbekiston Respublikasi Qurolli Kuchlari markaziy muzeyi) is an institution located in northern Tashkent, the capital of Uzbekistan. It is under the direct control of the Ministry of Defense and serves as one of its cultural institutions. The museum has over 10,000 pieces of Uzbek military memorabilia, dating back from Great Patriotic War era equipment to military artifacts from the Timurid dynasty. The total area is 3,000 square meters.

== History ==
It was founded in 1965 as the Museum of the Turkestan Military District of the Soviet Armed Forces. It served under the Central House of Military Officers. It moved to his current building on 7 May 1975, in honor of the 30th anniversary of the German Instrument of Surrender. In 2010, a monument was erected, known as the "Oath to the Motherland". It was unveiled by the President Islam Karimov as a replacement for a Soviet Army that was taken down the previous year. The reasoning behind this move was that the Soviet monument "did not represent the values and the current state of the Uzbek army".

== Building and exhibits ==
There are more than 10,000 exhibits. The main activity of the museum is to educate young people and servicemen in the spirit of military patriotism and devotion to the motherland. The museum building is located in the Park of Military Glory "Jasorat". The names of 338 Uzbek soldiers who won the title of Hero of the Soviet Union, 53 recipients of the Order of Glory and those who received the title of "Hero of Uzbekistan" are engraved in marble around the central statue. The park is lined with World War II-era and modern combat equipment (MIG21, Katyusha JM13, tanks, cannons, howitzers). The banner of the Tashkent Higher All-Arms Command School is located at the museum.

The building consists of 3 floors and the expositions are divided into 3 military historical periods. Floor 1 is dedicated to military history of the Timurid Period. The second floor is dedicated to the contribution of the people of the Uzbek SSR in the Great Patriotic War. The third floor consists of military actions conducted by the Armed Forces of Uzbekistan. The museum has become a unique scientific center among the museums of the republic to cover the activities of the army. A council of war and Armed Forces veterans has been set up at the museum.

== See also ==
- Central Armed Forces Museum
- National Military-Patriotic Center of the Armed Forces of Kazakhstan
- Mongolian Military Museum
