= Kakaydy =

- IATA: none; ICAO: UT1M

Summary
- Operator: Uzbek Air Force
- Location: Kakydy, Uzbekistan
- Elevation AMSL: 1,207 ft / 368 m
- Coordinates: 37°37′27″N 67°31′03″E
- Interactive map of Kakaydy

Runways
Direction	Length		Surface
Direction	ft	m	Surface
02/20		2,400	Asphalt

Kakaydy or Kokand or Kokaydy is a military airbase situated about 40 kilometres northeast of the town of Termez in Uzbekistan.

During the Soviet period (especially during the Soviet–Afghan War from 1979 to 1989) it was one of the key Soviet Air Force bases in Central Asia, intensively used by military aircraft. At the same time up to 80 aircraft were served.

At the Kakaydy aerodrome the 115th Guards Fighter Orshansky Order of Kutuzov and Alexander Nevsky Aviation Regiment (115 GIAP) was based. In 1980 Alexander Zelin served as deputy commander of the regiment. In 1988 it began to re-air regiment on aircraft MiG-29. March 6, 1989 hosted the first flying change on the MiG-29.

In 1992, the 115th GIAP was transferred to Uzbekistan and later in the Uzbek Air Force was renamed the 61st IAP (61 Fighter Air Regiment).

Elements of the 186th IShAP, Russian Air Force flying Sukhoi Su-25s operated from Kakaydy around 2001, principally in relation to Afghanistan.
