= Ministry of Defense (Uzbekistan) =

Government ministry of Uzbekistan

Ministry of Defense of the Republic of Uzbekistan
- O'zbekiston Respublikasi Mudofaa vazirligi
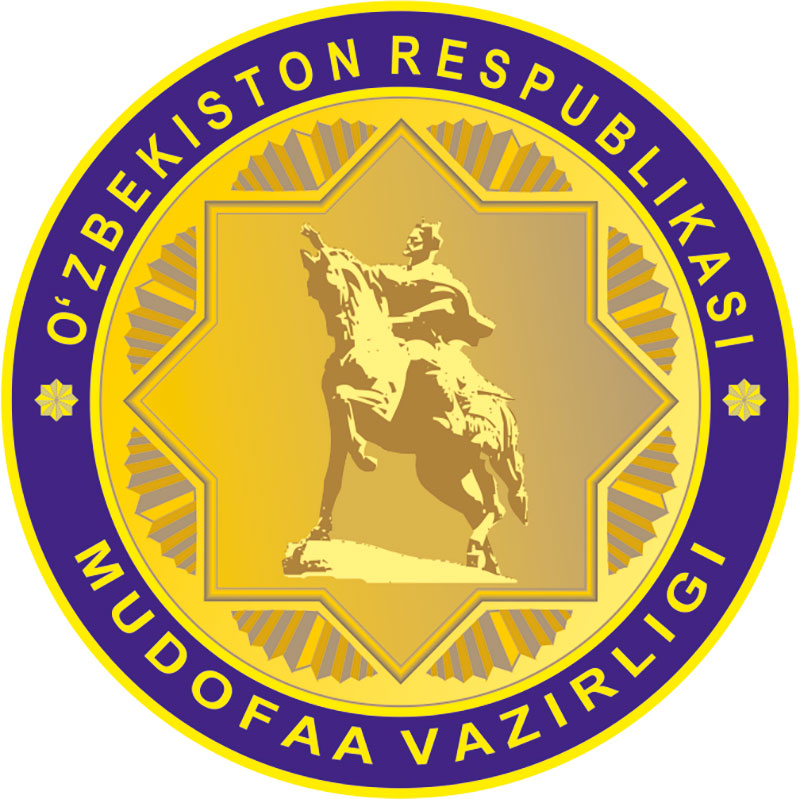
- Seal of the Ministry of Defence

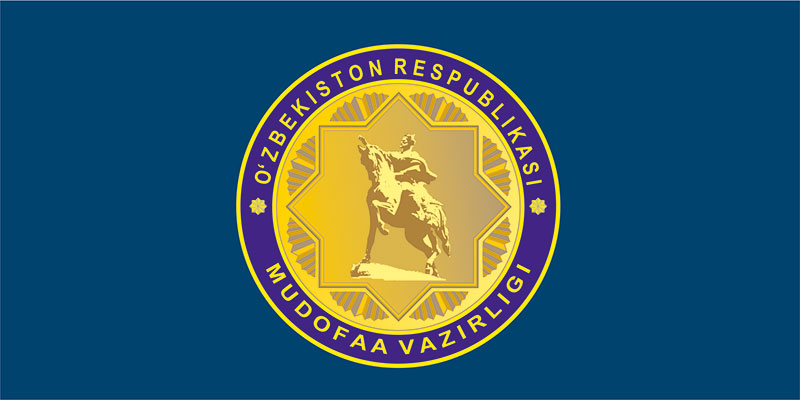
- Flag of the Ministry of Defence

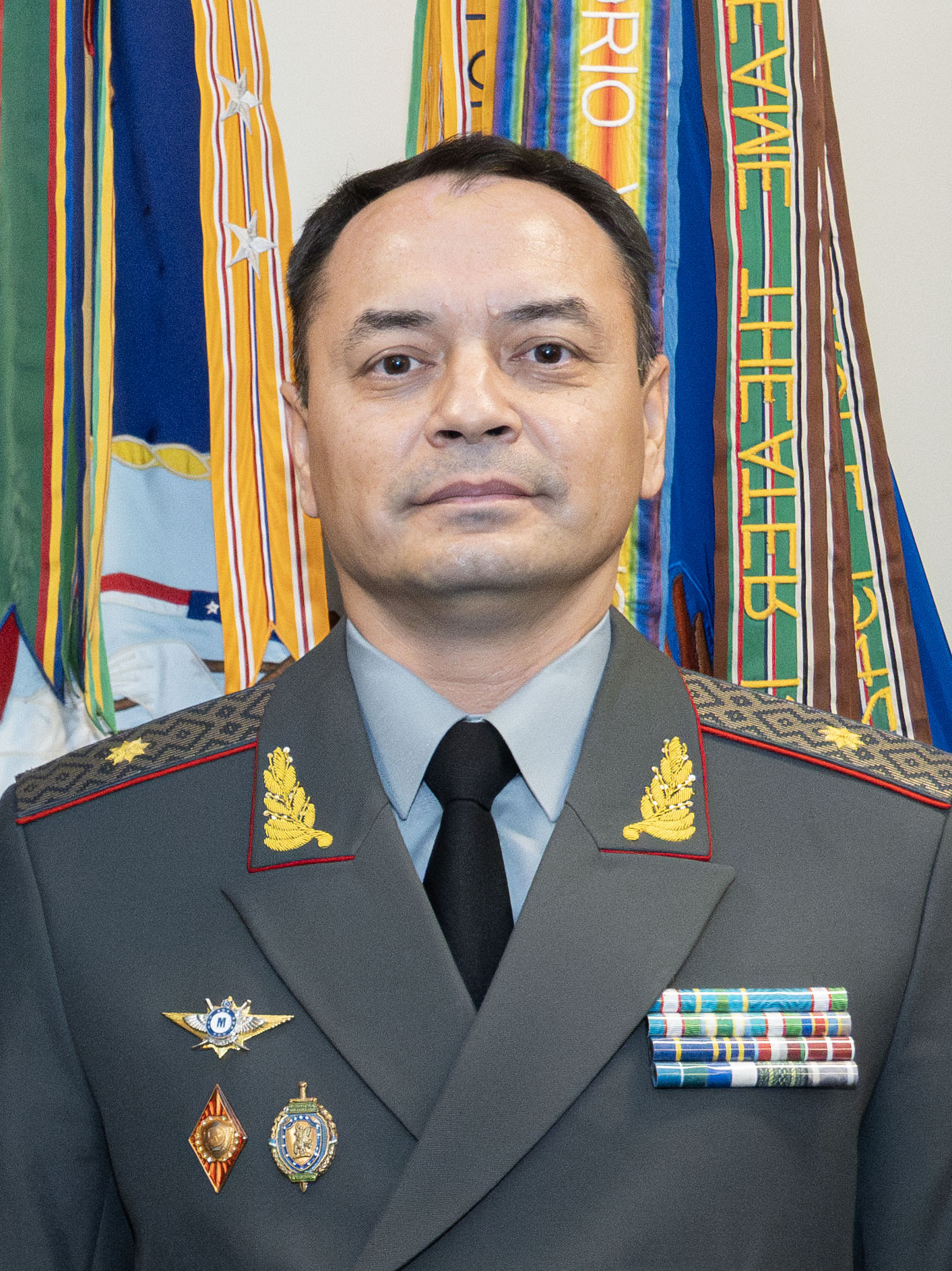
- Minister of Defense Shukhrat Kholmukhamedov

Defense Ministry overview
- Formed: July 3, 1992
- Preceding Defense Ministry: Soviet Defense Ministry
- Jurisdiction: Government of Uzbekistan
- Headquarters: 100 Mirzo Ulugbek Avenue, Tashkent, Uzbekistan
- Minister responsible: Lieutenant General Shukhrat Kholmukhamedov, Minister of Defense
- Defense Ministry executive: Major General Zainobiddin Iminov, First Deputy Defense Minister and Chief of the General Staff
- Website: Ministry of Defense of Uzbekistan

The Ministry of Defense of the Republic of Uzbekistan (Uzbek: O'zbekiston Respublikasi Mudofaa vazirligi) exercises administrative and operational leadership of the Armed Forces of the Republic of Uzbekistan. The Uzbek Minister of Defense is the nominal head of all the Armed Forces, serving under the President of the Republic of Uzbekistan, who is the Supreme Commander-in-Chief of the Armed Forces of the Republic of Uzbekistan. In this capacity, the minister exercises day-to-day administrative and operational authority over the armed forces. In wartime, the defense minister also serves in an official capacity as the Deputy Supreme Commander-in-Chief of the military. The General Staff, the executive body of the Ministry of Defense, implements the defense minister's operational instructions and orders. The Oliy Majlis exercises legislative authority over the Ministry of Defense through the Government of Uzbekistan, which is nominally responsible for maintaining the armed forces at the appropriate level of readiness.

The ministry is currently located in the former headquarters of Turkestan Military District (TurkVO) on 100 Mirzo Ulugbek Avenue (formerly known as Maxim Gorky Avenue) in Tashkent. The current Uzbek minister of Defense is Lieutenant General Shukhrat Kholmukhamedov.

== History ==
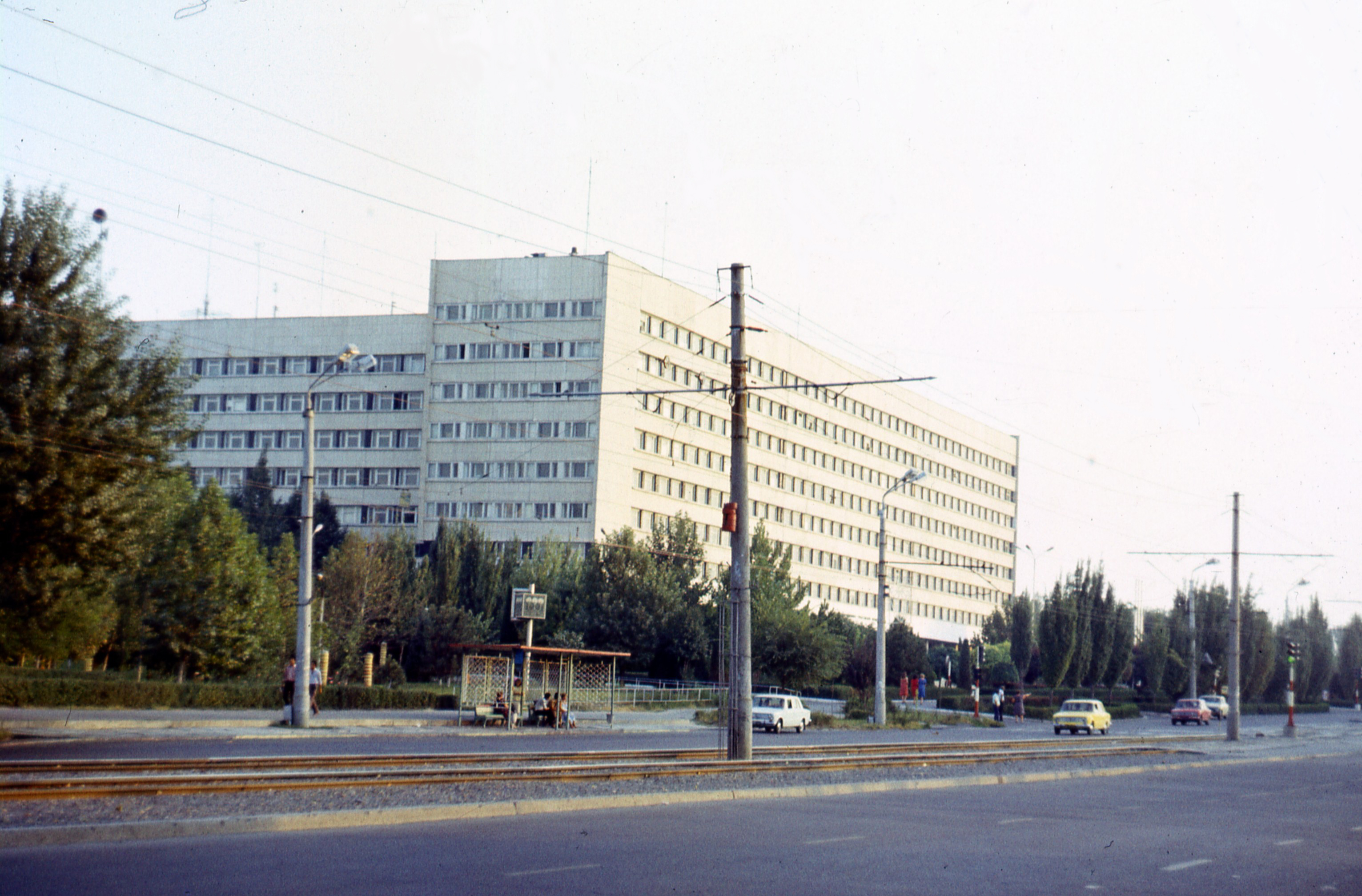
Staff building of the TurkVO in 1977

The ministry was created as one of the first military departments established in the former Soviet Union, being established one day after the creation of the Ministry of Defense of Azerbaijan. On September 6, 1991, the newly elected president Islam Karimov signed a decree establishing the Ministry of Defense, being originally named as the main military department of the Uzbek SSR. On July 3, 1992, the department was renamed to the Ministry of Defense. The appointment of the first civilian to the ministry in the early 2000s were part of plans to "establish civilian control over military structures within the state", with the defence ministry playing a more administrative role, while army commanders took charge of military operations.

== Purpose ==
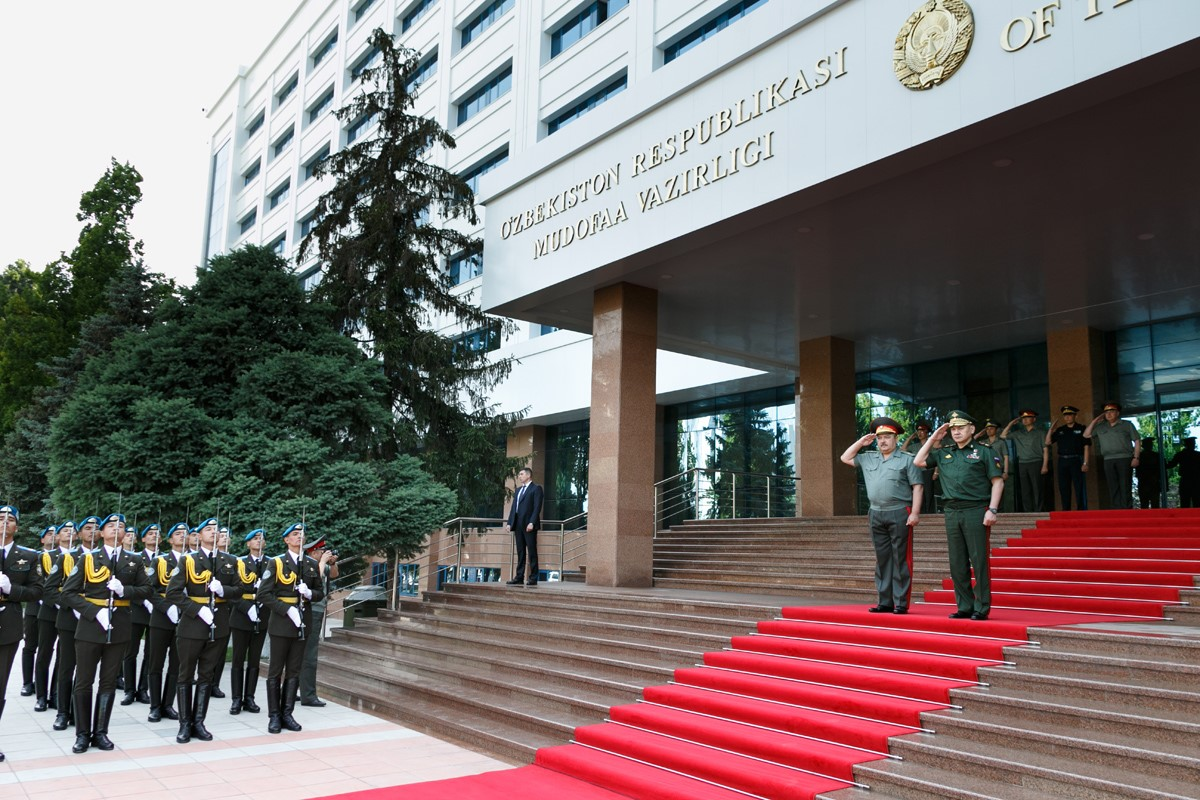
The headquarters of the ministry in Tashkent

The Ministry of Defense manages its subordinate troops, and ensures the implementation of state policy in the field of defense and army building, equipping the national military with modern weapons and military equipment, expanding military cooperation, and organizing of recruitment and training of the armed forces. The Ministry of Defense has five military districts, a special purpose unit (communications, engineering, chemical, etc.), a counter-terrorism unit and a special operations unit, as well as higher military educational institutions. The ministry also maintains and operates the State Museum of the Armed Forces of Uzbekistan.

== Organization ==
=== Departments ===
- Main Directorate of Military Engineering and Construction Formation
- Department of Information and Mass Communications

=== General Staff ===
In August 1998, at a meeting of the National Security Council under the President of Uzbekistan, it was decided to separate the General Staff from the Ministry of Defense. In 2000, the General Staff created and was subordinated to the Ministry of Defense and was renamed to the Joint Headquarters of the Armed Forces, which is the sole command body for the development and implementation of decisions in the field of armed defense of the sovereignty and territorial integrity of the country. It is responsible for developing the foundations of the national military strategy, developing the structure of the military, managing state committees and departments and carry out strategic and operational planning.

=== Educational establishments ===
- Academy of the Armed Forces of Uzbekistan (formerly the Tashkent Higher All-Arms Command School)
- Military Institute of Information and Communication Technologies and Communications
- Military Medical Academy of the Armed Forces of Uzbekistan

The government maintains a command and staff college for the military in Tashkent, based on the former Soviet TVOKU higher command college.

=== Special units ===
Different special units in the armed forces include the following:

- Central Song and Dance Ensemble of the Armed Forces – Founded on 27 May 1992.
- Honor Guard Battalion
- Band of the Ministry of Defense

=== Public Council ===
On 24 October 2012, the Public Council of the Ministry of Defence was established. It is designed to promote the participation of citizens and NGOs in the development of military policy. The council consists of 28 members, including the members of the Senate and the Legislative Chamber, representatives of governmental and non-governmental organizations, intellectuals, cultural workers and scientists. From those 28 members, five commissions based in five priority areas are operating.

== Territorial directorates ==
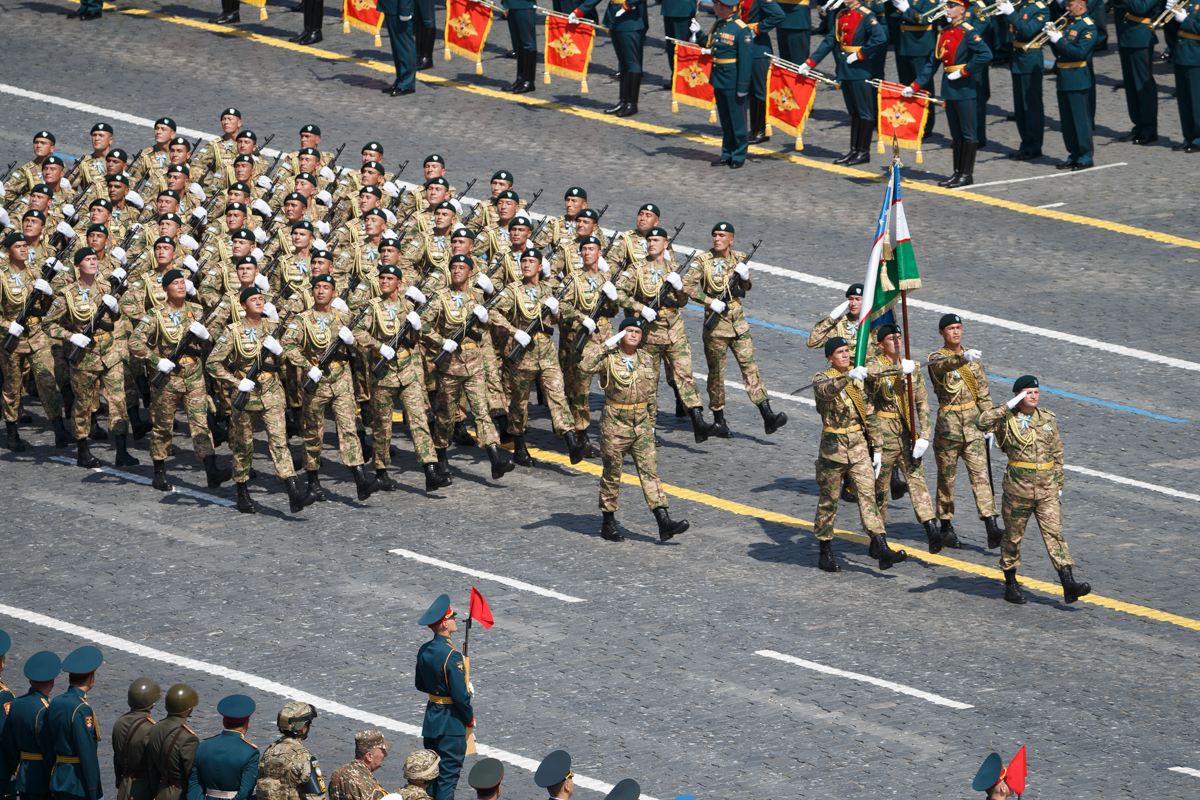
Forces of the Uzbek defence ministry during a military parade on Red Square.

Military districts of the armed forces are under the jurisdiction of the defense ministry, with their headquarters being the center of their regions of which they are responsible for. It is the main military administrative unit and territorial general military operational-strategic association that protects the security and territorial integrity of the Republic of Uzbekistan for the specific operational areas. The following are a list of military districts in Uzbekistan:

District	Headquarters Location
Northwest Military District	HQ Nukus
Southwest Special Military District	HQ Karshi
Central Military District	HQ Dzhizak
Eastern Military District	HQ Ferghana
Tashkent Military District	HQ Tashkent

== List of ministers ==
No.	Portrait	Name (lifespan)	Term of office			Political party	Ref.
No.	Portrait	Name (lifespan)	Took office	Left office	Time in office	Political party	Ref.
1		Colonel General; Rustam Akhmedov (1943–2025)	6 September 1991	29 September 1997	6 years, 23 days	Military	
2		Colonel General; Hikmatulla Tursunov (born 1953)	29 September 1997	20 February 2000	2 years, 144 days	Military	
3		Lieutenant General; Yuriy Agzamov (born 1949)	20 February 2000	30 September 2000	223 days	Military	
4		Kadyr Gulyamov (Note: The first and only civilian defense minister of Uzbekistan.) (born 1945)	30 September 2000	18 November 2005	5 years, 49 days	Independent	
5		Major General; Ruslan Mirzayev (born 1965)	18 November 2005	17 September 2008	2 years, 304 days	Military	
6		Colonel General; Qobul Berdiev (born 1955)	17 September 2008	4 September 2017	8 years, 352 days	Military	
7		Lieutenant General; Abdusalom Azizov (born 1960)	4 September 2017	11 February 2019	1 year, 160 days	Military	
8		Colonel General; Bakhodir Kurbanov (born 1969)	11 February 2019	23 November 2024	5 years, 286 days	Military	
9		Major General; Shukhrat Kholmukhamedov	23 November 2024	Incumbent	1 year, 258 days	Military	
