= Hikmatulla Tursunov =

Uzbek general

Minister of Defense
- In office September 29, 1997 – February 20, 2000
- President: Islam Karimov
- Preceded by: Rustam Akhmedov
- Succeeded by: Yuri Agzamov

Personal details
- Born: 18 June 1953 (age 71); Tashkent, Uzbek SSR, Soviet Union

Military service
- Allegiance: Soviet Union; Uzbekistan
- Rank: Colonel General

Colonel General Hikmatulla Kuchkarovich Tursunov (Uzbek: Hikmatilla Qoʻchqorovich Tursunov, Russian: Хикматулла Кучкарович Турсунов) is an Uzbek military officer who was Minister of Defence of Uzbekistan from 1997 to 2000.
