= Shukhrat Kholmukhamedov =

Uzbek general

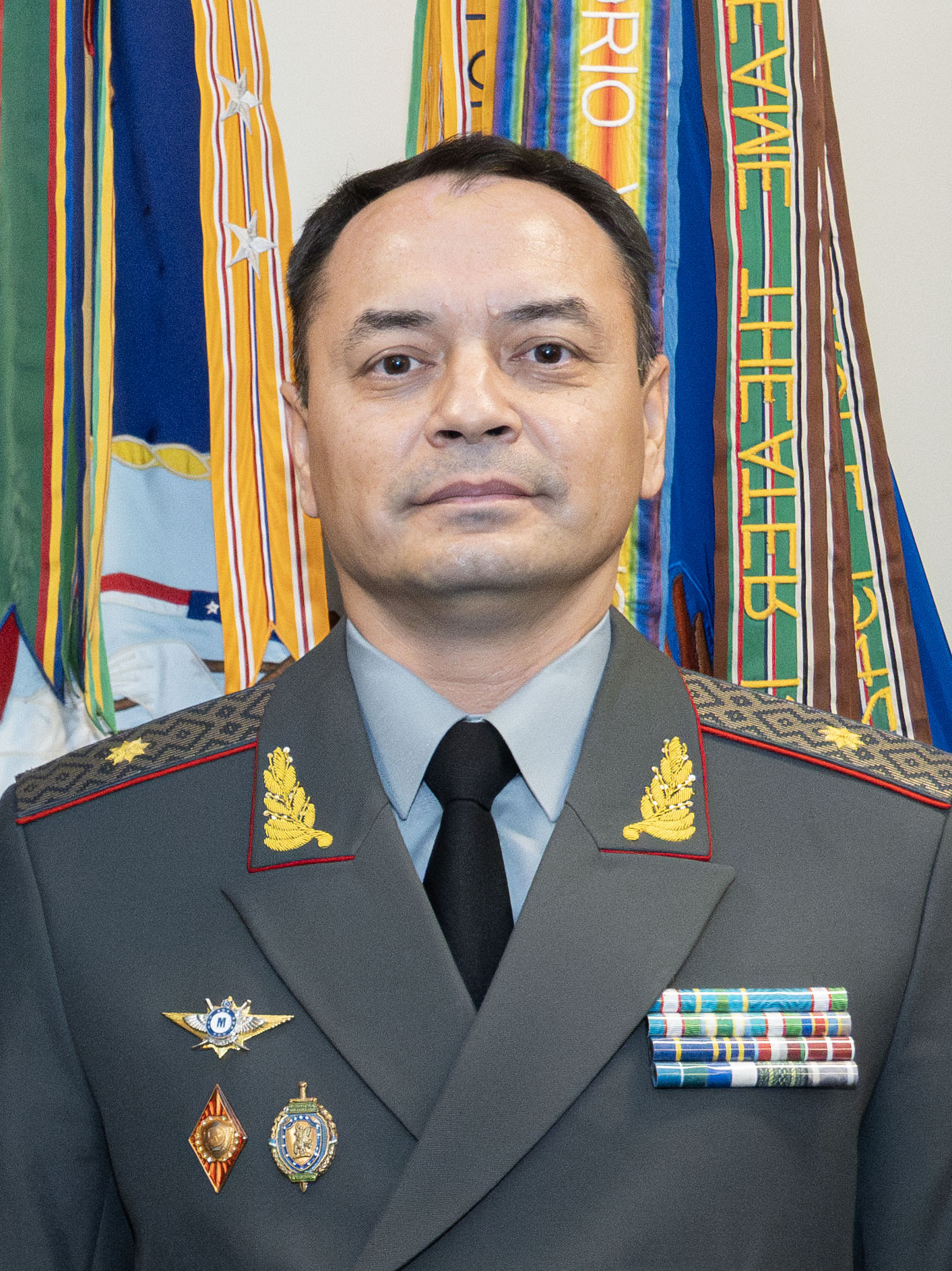
- Shukhrat Kholmukhamedov at the Pentagon on September 9, 2024

Minister of Defense
- Incumbent
- Assumed office November 23, 2024
- President: Shavkat Mirziyoyev
- Preceded by: Bakhodir Kurbanov

Personal details
- Born: Uzbek SSR, Soviet Union
- Education: Academy of the Armed Forces of Uzbekistan

Military service
- Allegiance: Uzbekistan
- Years of service: 1999 - Present
- Rank: Major General

Major General Shukhrat Gairatzhonovich Kholmukhamedov is an Uzbek military leader who is the current Minister of Defense since 2024.

He was appointed Chief of the General Staff of the Armed Forces of Uzbekistan on 23 March 2021. He was also awarded the rank of Major General at the same time. Prior to his appointment, he served as Deputy Defense Minister, Deputy Secretary of the Presidential Security Council and Deputy Minister of Emergency Situations.

In 2016, he was awarded the Sodiq Khizmatlari Uchun medal.
