= Armed Forces of the Republic of Uzbekistan =

Combined military forces of the Uzbekistan

- Özbekiston Respublikasi Qurolli Kuçlari
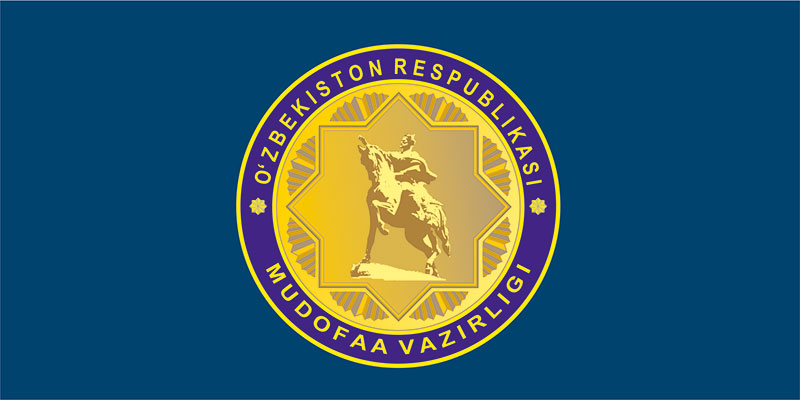
- Flag of the Ministry of Defence of Uzbekistan
- Founded: 14 January 1992; 34 years ago
- Service branches: Ground Forces; Air and Air Defence Forces; River Force; National Guard; Border Troops
- Headquarters: Mirzo Ulugbek Avenue, Tashkent, Uzbekistan

Leadership
- President of Uzbekistan: Shavkat Mirziyoyev
- Minister of Defense: Major General Shukhrat Kholmukhamedov
- Chief of the General Staff: Major General Zainobiddin Iminov

Personnel
- Conscription: 18 years of age for compulsory military service; conscript service obligation - 12 months
- Active personnel: 120,000 (2025); 30,000 paramilitary (2025)

Expenditure
- Percent of GDP: 4-4,5%, 6,21 billion dollars (2026 est.)

Industry
- Foreign suppliers: Russia; United States; China; Kazakhstan; Turkey; Belarus; Israel; Indonesia; South Korea; Spain; France; Germany; Czech Republic; United Kingdom; India; Iran; Pakistan; United Arab Emirates; Poland; Japan; Azerbaijan; Ukraine

Related articles
- Ranks: Rank insignia

The Armed Forces of the Republic of Uzbekistan (Uzbek: Özbekiston Respublikasi Qurolli Kuçlari) are the armed forces of Uzbekistan. They consist of the Uzbek Ground Forces and the Uzbekistan Air and Air Defence Forces under the defence ministry. Paramilitary units include the National Guard, a Frontier Service, and a River Force. It is reported that the Armed Forces of Uzbekistan are the strongest in Central Asia.

'The country has also began professionalizing its military, an effort that has only limited success and erratic government support. But even in Uzbekistan, these changes represent merely a modest beginning and most of the benefits are concentrated in a few elite, higher readiness formations rather than uniformly applied to the entire force. The Uzbek military is woefully inadequate, but it is far superior to its neighbours.'

== History ==
=== Pre-history ===
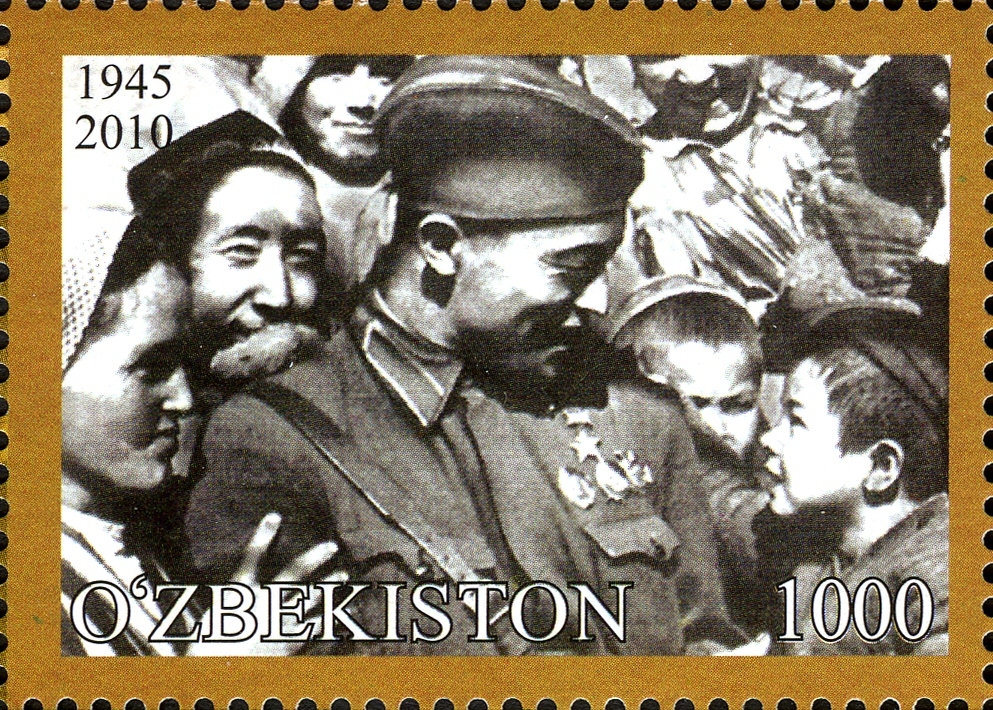
An Uzbek Red Army soldier after returning from the Eastern Front, 1945

Tashkent, the capital of Uzbekistan, used to be the headquarters of the Soviet Turkestan Military District and on 20 February 1992, the new Ministry of Defence took over the offices which had been formerly occupied by the district headquarters staff. The Uzbek SSR had the strongest Soviet military presence of the other Central Asian Republics, controlling its own and operating its own domestic Ministry of Internal Affairs (MVD) independent of the Ministry of Internal Affairs of the Soviet Union.

=== Establishment of armed forces and military institutions ===
On 2 July 1992 a Presidential Decree established a Ministry of Defence to supersede the Ministry of Defence Affairs. Over the succeeding years, Uzbekistan replaced Russian officers with ethnic Uzbeks and restructured the military to focus on targets like civil unrest, drug trafficking, and Hizb-ut-Tahrir. The three major Soviet military academies, the Tashkent Higher All-Arms Command School, the Chirchiq Higher Tank Command and Engineering School, and the Samarkand Higher Military Automobile Command School, were located in Uzbekistan. This caused the government to not send Uzbek officers to Russia for training. In 1994, they established the joint Armed Forces Academy, to train officers of all branches. Though the Uzbek language was becoming more in use by the army, Russian remained the main language used in training officers, due to the fact that most manuals were in Russian. But today Uzbek language is used in all spheres of defense system as it is an only state language in Uzbekistan

=== Development ===
In October 1993, by the decree, the 2nd Mobile Army Corps was formed on the basis of the 105th Guards Vienna Airborne Division, and the 1st Army Corps was established on the basis of the former 59th Army Corps. In January 1994, the 108th Motorized Rifle Division was disbanded, and its military units were incorporated into the 1st Army Corps. Disbanded regiments were replaced by motorized infantry, mountain artillery, tank, and anti-aircraft artillery brigades. In April 1994, departments of defense were introduced in the regions of the republic, the Republic of Karakalpakstan and the city of Tashkent, and departments of defense in cities and districts.

Military reforms were implemented after the appointment of civilian Kadyr Gulyamov to the defence ministry. Soviet-style regimental structures, were replaced, with the basic fighting unit consisting of 14 soldiers. "Ranger" detachments based on the American model were also formed.

Since Shavkat Mirziyoyev came to power, the military has been involved in re-arming its military with modern equipment.

=== Activities and foreign relations ===
From August to September 1997, Uzbekistan took part in the exercises of the Central Asian Battalion (CENTRASBAT) in Kazakhstan and Uzbekistan. as part of an eight nation joint exercise which include the United States, Russia and Ukraine. After the September 11, 2001 attacks, the United States leased the Karshi-Khanabad airbase in southern Uzbekistan, which borders Afghanistan. The American base there was called "Camp Stronghold Freedom," yet was more often referred to as "K2 Airbase" by the personnel in theater.

In May 2005, the military was involved in suppressing unrest in the Ferghana Valley city of Andijan, which became known as the Andijan massacre. Consequently, the EU banned arms sales and imposed a one-year visa ban on 12 senior officials, including the security chief and interior and defence ministers, accusing them of bearing responsibility for the killings.

In the aftermath of the incident, President Karimov dismissed several senior military figures: Defense Minister Gulyamov, Head of the Joint Headquarters of the Armed Forces Ismail Ergashev, and Commander of the Eastern Military District Kosimali Akhmedov. Burnashev and Chernykh said that '..although these dismissals did not change the formal system of administration in the security and military structures, they reflected serious shifts in power relations among regional elites representing their clans.'

A joint statement of the member countries of the Shanghai Cooperation Organisation issued in early July 2005 on a conference in the Kazakh capital of Astana called for a withdrawal of US troops from military bases in Central Asia. On 29 July 2005, Uzbekistan invoked a provision asking the U.S. to leave within 180 days. On 21 November 2005, the withdrawal of US troops from Karshi-Khanabad and any other bases was completed.

The European Union lifted the arms sales ban in 2009. Uzbekistan and Russia signed a mutual defence pact in 2005 for closer military cooperation. This marked a stark contrast to a few years earlier, when the US appeared to be Uzbekistan's favoured foreign friend, and relations with Russia were cooler.

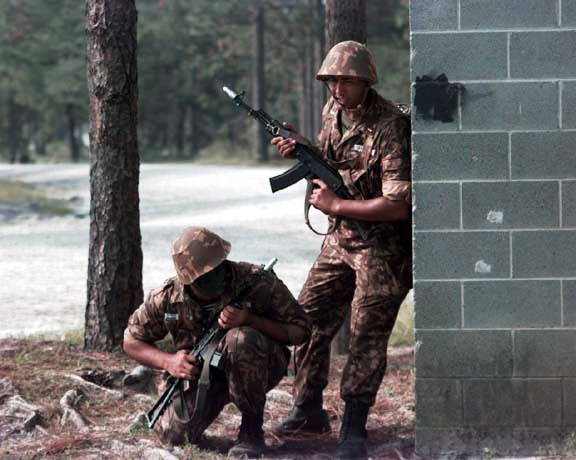
Uzbek soldiers during the Exercise Cooperative Osprey '96

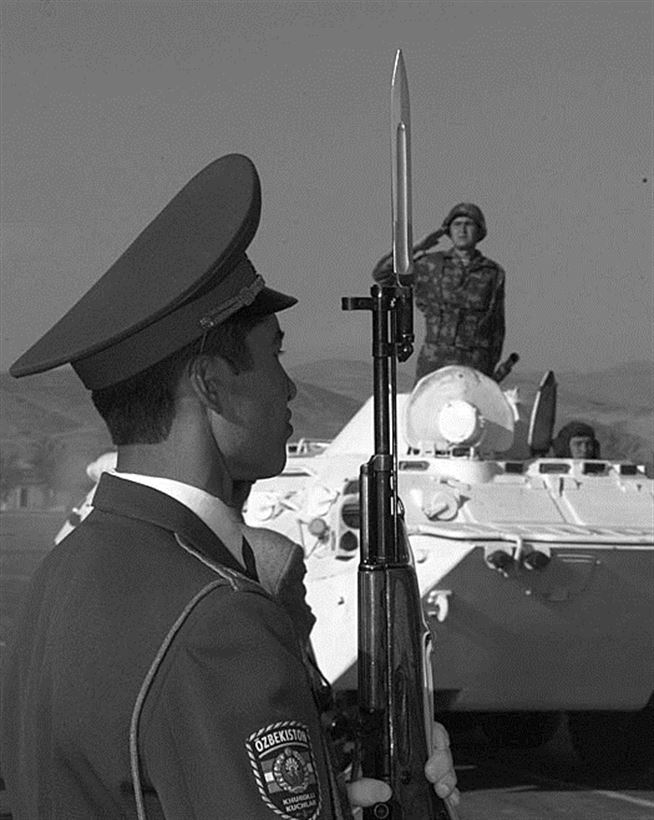
Ceremonies marking the end of CENTRAZBAT '97 exercises in Chirchik. Notably, the Uzbek Latin alphabet can be observed here, as for example in Özbekiston.

==== Arms control and non-proliferation ====
The government has accepted the arms control obligations of the former Soviet Union, and acceded to the Nuclear Non-Proliferation Treaty as a non-nuclear state. It has also supported an active program by the U.S. Department of Defense Defense Threat Reduction Agency in western Uzbekistan (Nukus and the biological warfare test laboratory on Vozrozhdeniye Island).

== Land Forces ==
The army includes five military districts. In 2001, the Tashkent garrison was transformed into the Tashkent Military District. The headquarters of the military districts and their areas of responsibility are as follows:

District	Headquarters Location	Notes
Northwest Military District	HQ Nukus	Karakalpakstan, Xorazm Province
Southwest Special Military District	HQ Karshi	Qashqadaryo Province, Surxondaryo Province, Bukhara Province, Navoiy Province
Central Military District	HQ Dzhizak	Dzhizak Province, Samarqand Province, Sirdaryo Province
Eastern Military District	HQ Ferghana	Fergana Province, Andijan Province, Namangan Province
Tashkent Military District	HQ Tashkent	Tashkent Province

== Air Forces ==
The Uzbek air forces consist of units formerly part of the 49th Air Army of the Turkestan Military District headquartered at Tashkent. There are two remaining combat units, brigades at Karshi-Khanabad and Dzhizak.

The 60th Separate Brigade is the former 735th Bomber Aviation Regiment combined with the former 87th Separate Reconnaissance Aviation Regiment. It has 31 Su-24s, 32 MiG-29s, and 6 Su-27s. Other recently disbanded units include the 61st Fighter Aviation Regiment at Kakaydy, which was itself a merger with the previous 115th Fighter Aviation Regiment, and the 62nd Fighter Aviation Regiment at Andijan. Regiments at both bases were disbanded in 1999. As many as 26 stored Su-17s, apparently in very bad condition, remain at Chirchiq (see Google Earth 41°30'05.69"N 69°33'44.90"E)

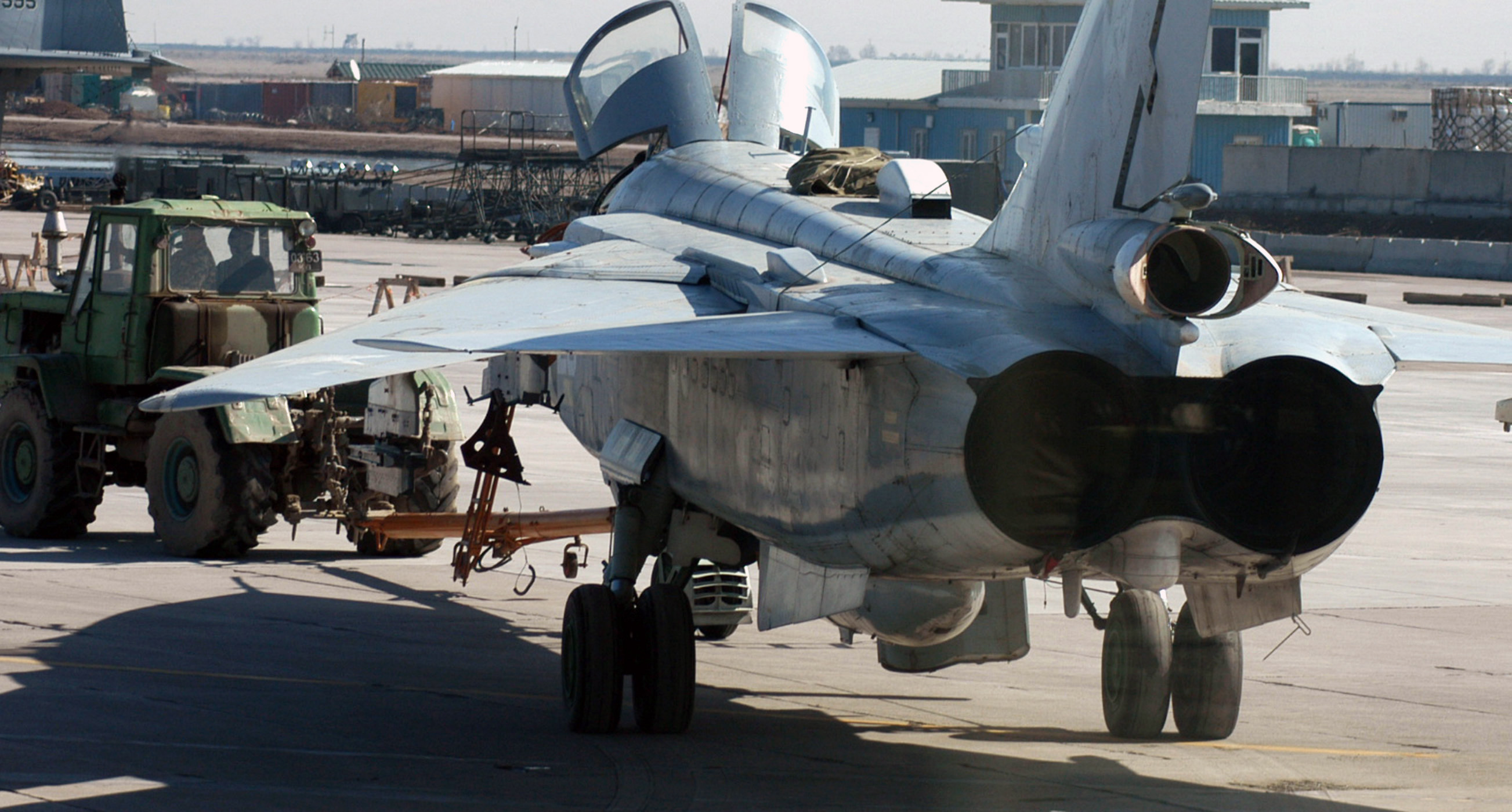
Uzbek Air Force maintenance personnel tow an Air Force Su-24 Fencer aircraft at Karshi-Khanabad Air Base.

== Other elements ==
=== Special units ===
Different special units in the armed forces include the following:

- Central Song and Dance Ensemble of the Armed Forces – Founded on 27 May 1992.
- Honour Guard Battalion
- Band of the Ministry of Defence
- Band of the Ministry of the Interior
- Band of the National Guard
- Equestrian Squadron of the National Guard

=== Army Special Forces ===
- 15th Independent Special Forces Brigade
- 17th Air Assault Brigade
- Independent Special Purpose Battalion "Lynx"

Uzbekistan formed Special Forces Battalions which are trained and formed by American and other NATO experts, located in provinces which border troubled republics like Afghanistan and Tajikistan. Units of the Special Operations Forces are based in the most important operational areas, including the mountainous areas of the Surkhandarya and Tashkent regions.

=== Paramilitary and militarized forces ===
The following institutions are uniformed and have military affiliations but are not part of the Armed Forces:

- National Security Service (SNB), the country's secret police
  - Frontier Service (also called the Committee for State Border Protection of the National Security Service), the border guard of Uzbekistan. They have gotten into disagreements with the Kyrgyz Frontier Force in the Batken Region.
- Internal Troops, they are commonly used against Islamic terrorists in the border regions near Tajikistan and Kyrgyzstan. It maintains several Spetsnaz battalions:
  - Scorpion Group
  - Bars
- Uzbekistan National Guard also serves as a specialized elite force.

== Military industry ==
In November 2017, at the initiative of President Mirziyoyev, the State Committee for Defense Industry (Uzbek: Mudofaa sanoati davlat qömitasi) was created, serving as an authorized body of state administration responsible for the implementation of state defense orders and defense production organization. Abbreviated by the Russian term of Goskomoboronprom, it has developed the country's industrial potential in the field of production of military and dual-use products. Under the committee, a joint Uzbek-Turkish enterprise for the production of military uniforms was created.

The following enterprises serve under the committee:

- State Unitary Enterprise Vostok
- State Enterprise CHARZ
- Center for Innovative Technologies
- TexMash
- RemTex
- Krantas Group

In 2020, the first Uzbek light armored personnel carrier began the process of development. The APCs, known as the Tarlon and Qalqon light armored vehicles, was designed and manufactured at the enterprises of the military-industrial complex. It designed for the protection and tracking of convoys, sanitary transportation, engineering, radiation, chemical and biological reconnaissance and fire support.

== Military education ==
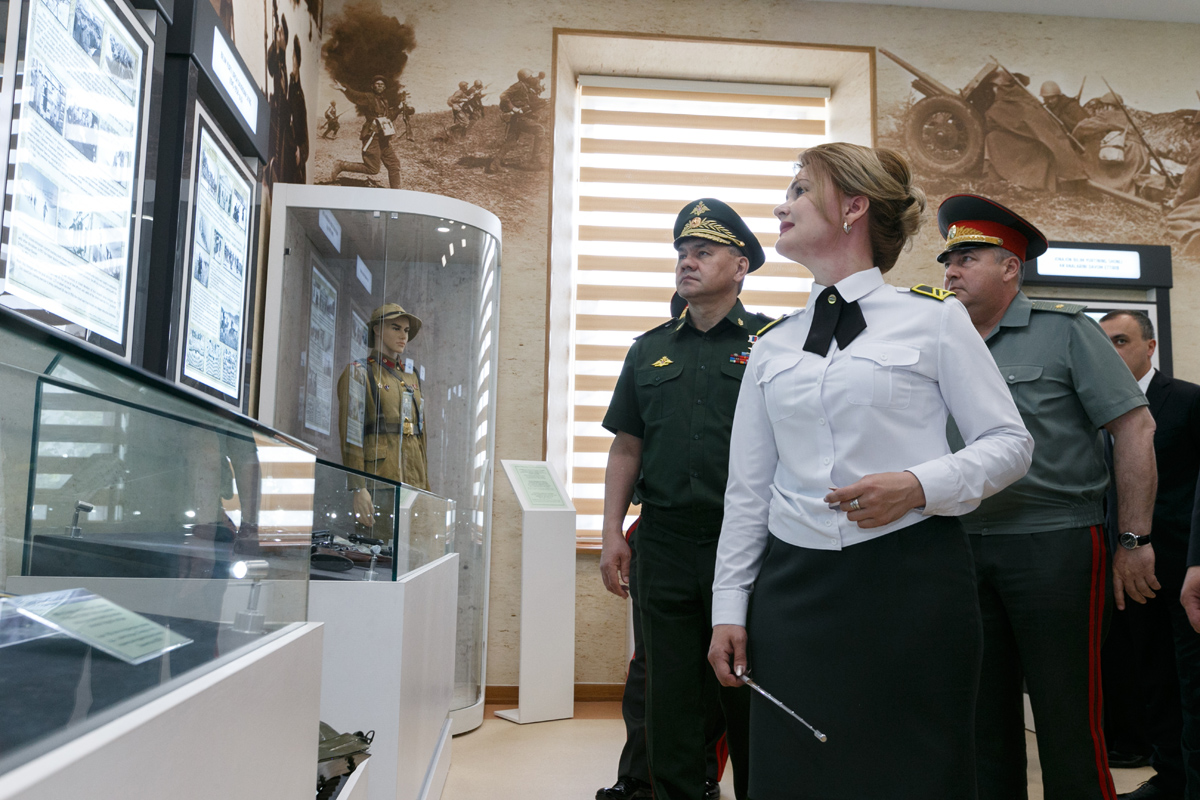
Sergey Shoigu at the academy of the armed forces in 2018

=== Higher education ===
- Under the Defence Ministry
  - University of Military Security and Defense
    - Academy of the Armed Forces of Uzbekistan
    - Military Institute of Information and Communication Technologies and Communications
    - Military Medical Academy
  - Ground Forces
    - Chirchiq Higher Tank Command and Engineering School
    - Samarkand Higher Military Automobile Command School
    - Jizzakh Higher Military Technological University
  - Air Force
    - Higher Military Aviation School
- Under Paramilitary services
  - Higher Military Customs Institute
  - Academy of the Ministry of Internal Affairs of Uzbekistan
  - Military-Technical Institute of the National Guard of Uzbekistan
  - Institute of Civil Defense of the Ministry of Emergency Affairs

=== NCO training ===
In January 2001, Sergeant Training Schools were established in the Tashkent, Central, South-West and Eastern military districts. In 2007, a fifth sergeant training school was opened in the Northwest Military District. The curriculum of the Sergeant Training School provides servicemen with basic instruction in managing tactical units, professional command skills related to military specialization, accurate situational assessments and decision-making, and methods of organizing the use of weapons and military equipment. The training program is aimed at developing the leadership qualities of sergeants and maintaining healthy morale and military skills in military units.

Officers of the military, national police, special forces, and Ministry of Internal Affairs attend courses at the Joint Service Officer Training Academy in the capital.

=== Youth training ===
In addition to the schools mentioned, four military lyceums (high schools) operate in Tashkent, Samarkand, Fergana and Urgench, all of which were established in 1993, are run by the military for pre-military education.

== Military culture ==
=== Military oath ===
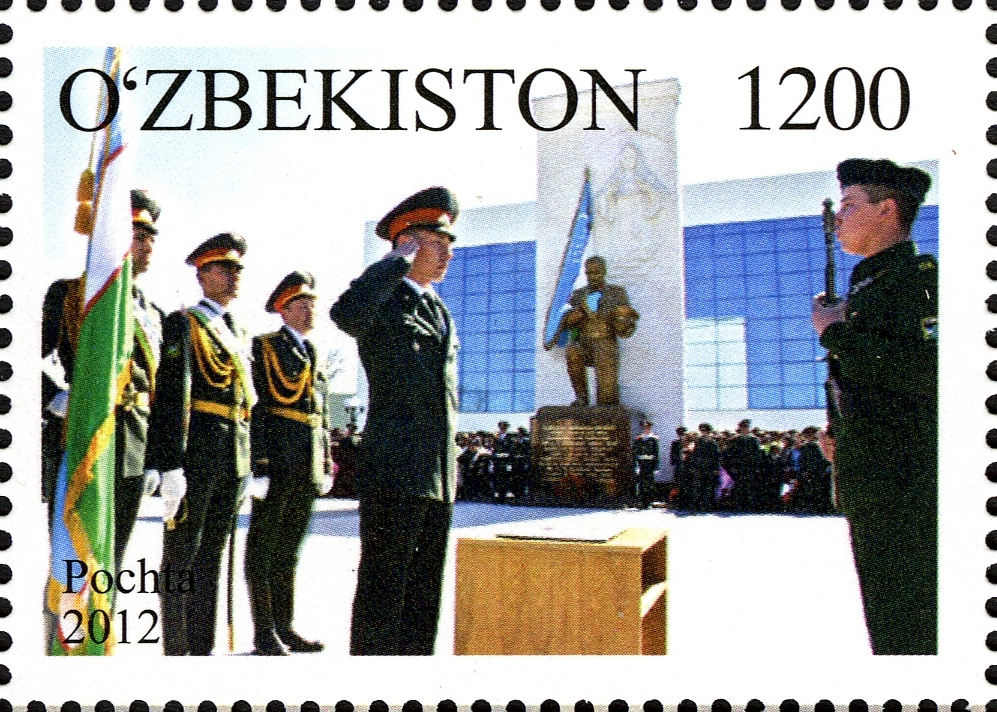
A 2012 stamp depicting a soldier taking the military oath

The military oath is taken by conscripts as a legal basis of the beginning of their military service. The oath is administered by the commanding officer of the unit while a colour guard lowers the national flag for the soldier to kiss after he/she has taken the oath. The first military oath of the Armed Forces of Uzbekistan was adopted at the 10th session of the 12th convocation of the Supreme Soviet of Uzbekistan on 3 July 1992. The following is the text for the 1992 version of the oath:

"I, (last name, first name, fatherland), joining the ranks of the Armed Forces of the Republic of Uzbekistan, solemnly swear allegiance to its people and the President.

I swear piously to abide by the Constitution and the laws of the Republic of Uzbekistan, to unconditionally fulfill military regulations, orders of commanders and chiefs, to strictly observe military discipline, to be honest, brave and watchful warrior.

I swear before the memory of my ancestors to be the true son of my homeland until the last breath, to withstand all the burdens and deprivations of military service, to keep state and military secrets.

I swear in the name of the bright future of my native Uzbekistan to be a worthy advocate of its state interests and independence. If I break this solemn oath, then let me be overtaken by the harsh punishment of the laws and the contempt of the people!"

With the entry of the Law "On General Military Commitment and Military Service" adopted by the Oliy Majlis in 2002, the oath was abolished and the original text was made unavailable. In April 2018, a long proposed new version of the oath was approved. The new version is as follows:

"When I am in the ranks of the Armed Forces of the Republic of Uzbekistan, I swear to honor the Republic of Uzbekistan, to be loyal to my people and to the President.

I swear to honor and adhere to the Constitution and the laws of the Republic of Uzbekistan, to obey the orders of the military commanders and officers placed before me, to strictly adhere to military discipline and to be an honest, brave and vigilant serviceman.

Until the last breath, I swear in the spirit of my ancestors to be a faithful child of my Homeland, to steadfastly endure all the hardships and difficulties of the military service and to maintain the secrets of the state and the military secrets of the armed forces.

For the bright future of my dear Uzbekistan, I swear to be a worthy defender of state interests and independence.

If I ever break this solemn oath, I would be subject to the most severest punishments prescribed by law and the hatred of my people!"

=== Holidays ===
These are the military holidays observed by all service personnel the Uzbek Armed Forces:

- 14 January – Defender of the Motherland Day
- 15 February – International Duties Memorial Day
- 5 April – National Security Service Day
- 9 May – Day of Remembrance and Honour
- 3rd day in August – Uzbek Air Force Day
- 25 October – Police and Internal Affairs Servicemen's Day

=== Cultural institutions ===
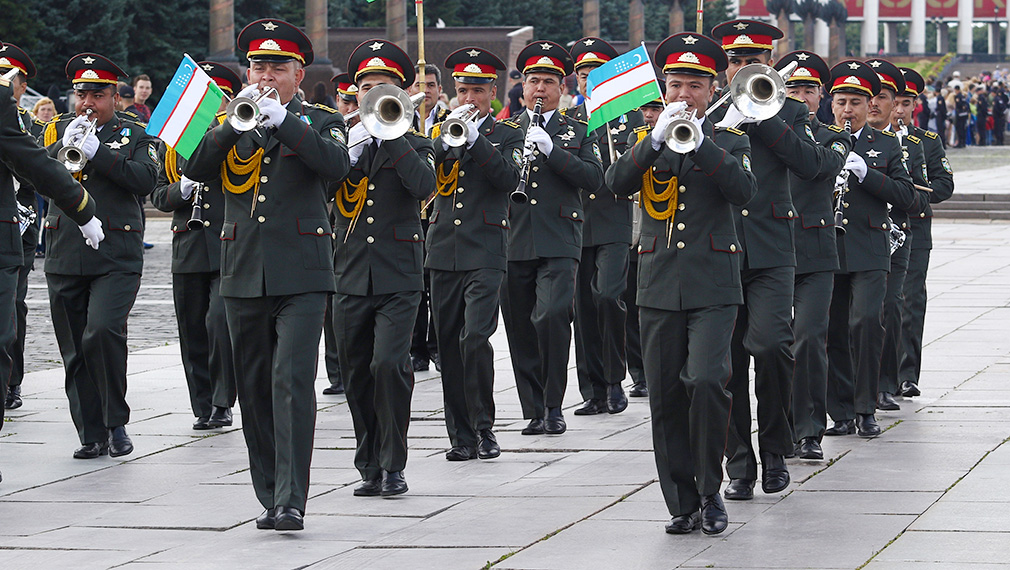
Band of the Ministry of Defense

The armed forces maintains a number of cultural institutions that operated under the Ministry of Defense. Those institutions include the following:

- State Museum of the Armed Forces of Uzbekistan – Founded in 1965 as the Museum of the Turkestan Military District, the State Museum of the Armed Forces (Uzbek: Özbekiston Respublikasi Qurolli Kuchlari markaziy muzeyi) is under the direct control of the Ministry of Defense, being located in the ministry's central building since May 1975. The museum exhibits over 10,000 pieces of memorabilia, including Second World War era tanks and military artifacts from the Timurid dynasty.
- Tashkent House of Military Officers – The main building was built in 1885 and was used as a military assembly by the Imperial Russian Army before the October Revolution of 1917. In 1924, it housed the first House of the Red Army. In 1945, it became the House of Officers for the HQ Turkestan Military District. In the 1990s, after Uzbekistan gained its independence, it was renamed the Central House of Officers of the Ministry of Defense of Uzbekistan. Since 2013, the original building of the Central House of Officers has been occupied by the Tashkent State Institute of Law.
- Center for Spirituality and Enlightenment of the Ministry of Defense

== See also ==
- List of equipment of the Armed Forces of the Republic of Uzbekistan
