= Yuriy Agzamov =

Yuriy Nabiyevich Agzamov (born in 1949) is an Uzbek military figure and government official who served as Minister of Defense from 20 February 2000 to 30 September 2000.

== Biography ==
In 1970, he graduated from the Tashkent Higher Tank Command School named after Pavel Rybalko (now the Chirchiq Higher Tank Command and Engineering School), and in 1977 from the Malinovsky Military Armored Forces Academy. He then commissioned into the Soviet Army, first serving as a regimental chief of staff in the Group of Soviet Forces in Germany. In the 1980s he served as military commissar of Bukhara and commissar of the Andijan regional military commissariat, in 1983 he served as chief of staff of a tank regiment in Babruysk, Mogilev Oblast (within the area of responsibility of the Byelorussian Military District), and later was transferred to the Turkmen Soviet Socialist Republic. In the late 1980s he was accepted into the leadership of the Tashkent Higher Military Tank School. In 1990–1998 he served as head of the school. He was promoted to Lieutenant General on January 13, 1999. Until February 2000 he was commander of the Southwest Special Military District.

From February 20, he became the Minister of Defense of Uzbekistan, replacing Hikmatulla Tursunov who was dismissed after an Afghan plane carrying Taliban members made an unauthorized landing in Tashkent. He served as the Minister of Defense of Uzbekistan from February 20 to September 30, 2000. Before taking up his new position, Agzamov's appointment coincided with the start of deliveries of American equipment to Uzbekistan at the start of the Global War On Terror.

On September 30, 2000, Agzamov was dismissed from his post (alongside commander of the Southwest Special Military District, Major General Yuri Filonenko) due to the loss of personnel in a helicopter crash during operations to combat the Islamic Movement of Uzbekistan. He was replaced by Kadyr Gulyamov. In September 2000, Agzamov was appointed Inspector General of the Armed Forces. He was later retired due to age.

== Personal life ==
Originally from Tashkent, his father is Uzbek while his mother is an ethnic Russian. He was married. His father-in-law, Baka Karimov, worked in the Fergana regional military commissariat.
