= Kadyr Gulyamov =

Uzbek politician

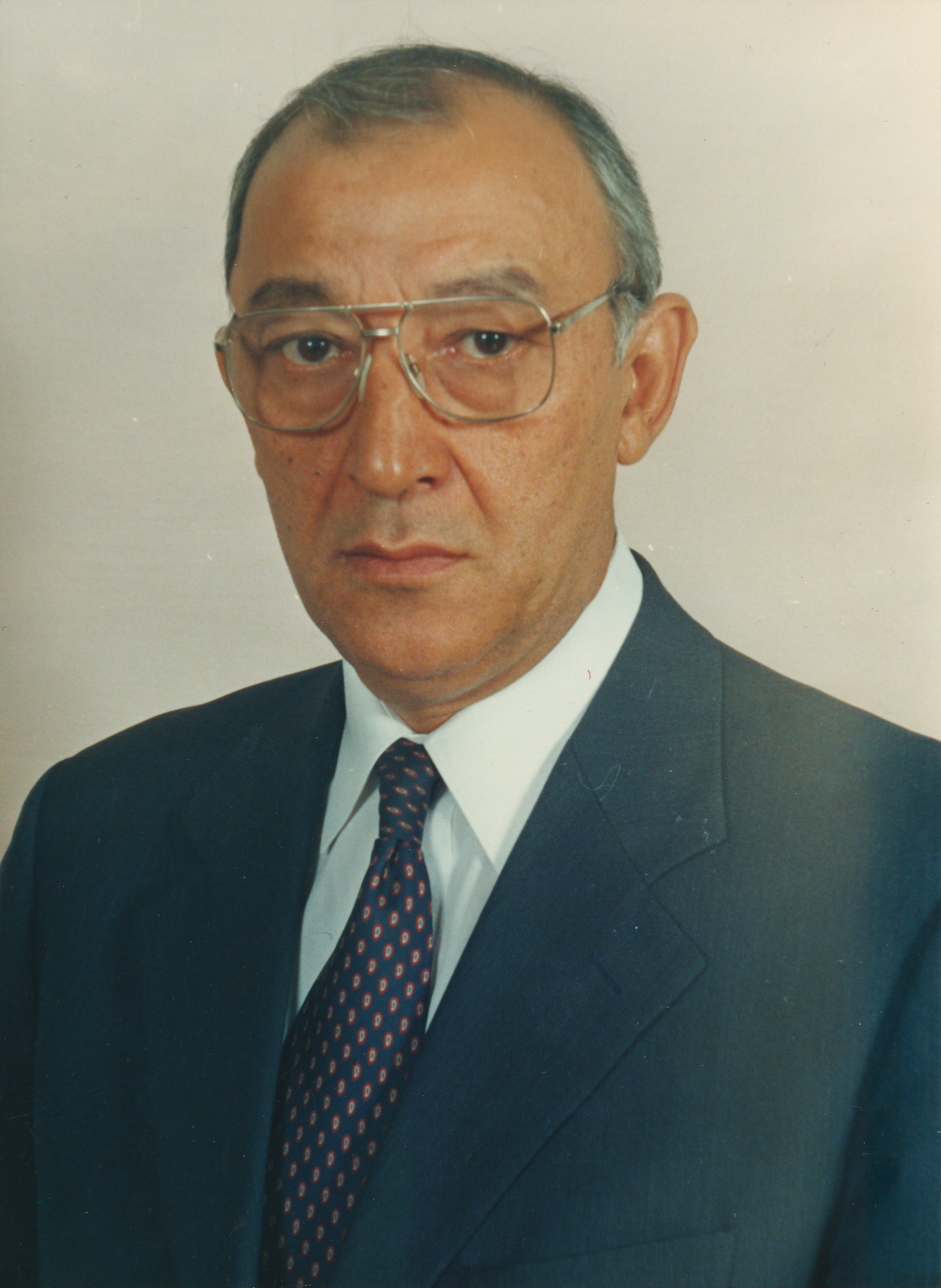

Minister of Defense
- In office 30 September 2000 – 18 November 2005
- President: Islam Karimov
- Preceded by: Yuri Agzamov
- Succeeded by: Ruslan Mirzaev

Personal details
- Born: 17 February 1945 (age 81) Tashkent, Uzbek SSR, Soviet Union
- Parent: Gʻafur Gʻulom (father)
- Education: Tashkent State University; Academy of Sciences of Uzbekistan

Kadyr Gafurovich Gulamov (Uzbek: Qodir Gʻulomov, Cyrillic Қодир Ғуломов, Russian: Кадыр Гафурович Гуламов; born 17 February 1945) is an Uzbek politician who has served as Minister of Defence of Uzbekistan. To date, he was the first and only civilian leader of an Uzbek military department.

== Biography ==
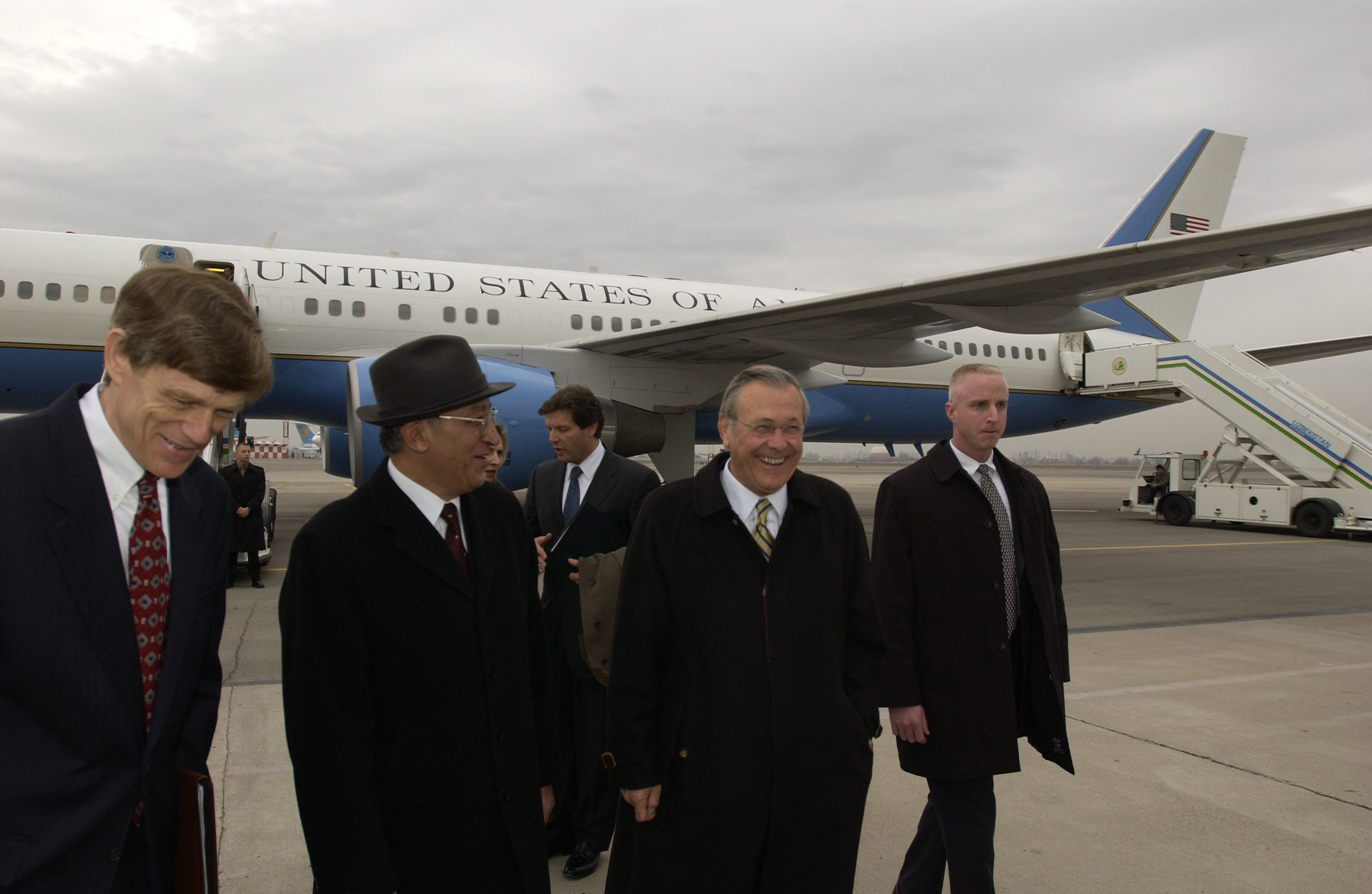
Gulyamov with Donald Rumsfeld.

He was born in Tashkent in February 1945. He is the son of the Soviet-Uzbek poet Gʻafur Gʻulom. In 1963 he began his studies at Tashkent State University before being sent to the Academy of Sciences of Uzbekistan in 1968. In the 30 years that followed, he worked as an official in the academy, becoming the Chief Scientific Secretary in 1999. He held his first government position that same year, when he was appointed Deputy Minister of Defense and Rector of the Academy of the Armed Forces of Uzbekistan. In May 1999, he was drafted into the Uzbek military and by presidential decree he was promoted to the rank of colonel. He became the first civilian minister of defense of the country in 2000, as well as concurrently State Advisor to the President Islam Karimov. He was dismissed from this post in 2005, and has been leading researcher of the Physics-Sun Association since 2006. On 15 November 2005, three days before his dismissal, the European Union issued a list of 12 top Uzbek officials who were banned from visiting EU member states for a year, a list which included Gulyamov among others. It was issued in response to the putting down of protests in Andijan that May.

== Work as defense minister ==
His appointment was part of plans to "establish civilian control over military structures within the state", according to the National Security Council Secretary. Under his leadership, the defence ministry played a more administrative role, army commanders took charge of military operations. He founded the Center for Simulation and Modeling of the Armed Forces in 2004. He led Uzbek military cooperation with the United States following the September 11 attacks and the start of Global War On Terror.

== Scientific activity ==
His scientific interests are related to the study of processes of multiple particle production in collisions of hadrons and nuclei with nuclei in the field of accelerator energies. Leader of a number of emulsion experiments carried out at CERN (Switzerland), Fermi and Brookhaven National Laboratories (USA), Joint Institute for Nuclear Research and Institute for High Energy Physics (Protvino, Russian Federation). He obtained a large amount of experimental data on collisions of hadron and nuclei with nuclei in the whole field of accelerator energies. Gulyamov proposed and implemented methods of correlation analysis to search for collective effects in nuclei collisions, observed dynamical correlations between particles from different kinematic regions, and showed that in central nuclei collisions multiple births have a multifractal character. He critically analyzed a number of theoretical approaches to the processes of birth of particles on nuclei, some of them removed from the scientific circulation or established the limits of their applicability, which allowed to establish the general structure of such processes and revealed the dominant mechanisms in different kinematic collisions areas and played an important role in the search for collective effects. In his scientific career, he performed a critical analysis of a number of theoretical approaches to the processes of particle production on nuclei. At the initiative of Gulyamov, the Institute of Materials Science of the Academy of Sciences of Uzbekistan was established in 1993, and in 1995, the Uzbek scientific and educational network UZSCINET was created. In 1997 and 2010, he made a proposal to organize an International Center for Solar Energy in Tashkent. He has over 300 scientific publications, most of which are published in international journals.

Doctor of Physical and Mathematical Sciences (1980), Professor, Corresponding Member (1989), Academician (1995) of the Academy of Sciences of Uzbekistan, Member of the Islamic World Academy of Sciences (1997). In 1993-2000 — Representative of Uzbekistan in the Scientific Committee of NATO, in 1996-1999 — Member of the Scientific Council of the INTAS program of the European Union, member of the Standing Committee of the International Union of Scientific Societies for Science and Technology in Developing Countries (ICSU COSTED).

== Awards ==
- State Prize of the Uzbek SSR in the Field of Science and Technology named after Al-Biruni (1983)
- Medal of the Oliy Majlis "Mustakillik" (1992)
- Shon-Sharaf Order II degree (2003)
