= Defender of the Motherland Day =

Military holiday in Uzbekistan

Defenders of the Motherland Day
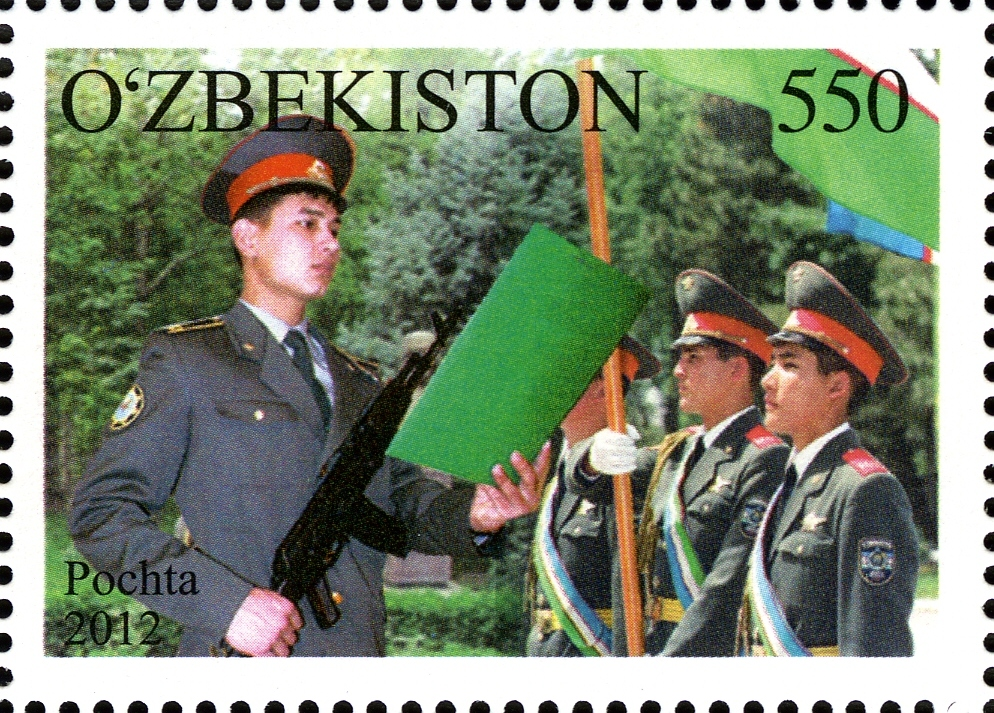
- Official name: Vatan himoyachilari kuni День Защитника Отечества
- Also called: Uzbek Army Day
- Observed by: Uzbekistan
- Celebrations: Military parades, ceremonies
- Date: 14 January
- Next time: 14 January 2027
- Frequency: annual

Defenders of the Motherland Day (Uzbek: Vatan himoyachilari kuni; Russian: День Защитника Отечества) also known as Uzbek Army Day is a holiday observed in Uzbekistan. It is celebrated on 14 January. It is the official professional holiday of the Uzbek Armed Forces.

== History ==
On 14 January 1992, the Armed Forces of the Republic of Uzbekistan was established. This is considered to be the official holiday of the Armed Forces. Before this, Uzbekistan as part of the Soviet Union recognized Soviet Army and Navy Day as the armed forces official holiday. Following the fall of the USSR, some former republics of the Soviet Union such as, Russia, Belarus, Kyrgyzstan, Tajikistan, and Kazakhstan continued to celebrate Soviet Army and Navy Day as Defender of the Fatherland Day. On 29 December 1993 the Uzbek Parliament established the Day of Defenders of Motherland to commemorate the anniversary of the establishment of the country's armed forces in 1992.

== Celebrations ==
On this day military units of the Tashkent Garrison line up in Independence Square, and accept congratulations and awards from the president and the minister of defense. Holiday activities also include a wreath laying ceremony at the Monument to the Independence of Uzbekistan and the Timur monument. On the holiday in 2019, the Oliy Majlis organized a round-table discussion on the topic "The Motherland is sacred and its defense is an honorable duty".
