= Military Institute of Information and Communication Technologies and Communications =

The Military Institute of Information and Communication Technologies and Communications (Uzbek: Axborot-kommunikatsiya texnologiyalari va kommunikatsiyalarining harbiy instituti; Russian: Военного института информационно-коммуникационных технологий и связи) is a specialized educational institution in the Armed Forces of Uzbekistan, under the Education System of the Ministry of Defense in Tashkent. It is currently led by Lieutenant Colonel Khakim Mukhitdinov. Its main campus is located in Yunusabad.

== History ==
It was established on 17 January 2019 by order of President Shavkat Mirziyoyev. It was the first special military institute to open in Uzbekistan. It was established in order to further improve the system of training officers in the field of information and communications. It was formed from a Special Department of the Tashkent University of Information Technologies named after Muhammad ibn Musa al-Khwarizmi, and is therefore the legal successor of the Special Faculty (which was established on 13 May 1993). On 26 December, the institute, as well as another military unit, were moved to a camp in the Zangiata District where it is currently located. The first ceremonial graduation of cadets took place on 26 June 2020.

== Educational aspects ==
The institutes provides training for officers in the following areas:

- Tactical Communications
- Tactical Special Communications and Protection of State Secrets
- Tactical Information Systems and Technologies
- Tactical Radio-Electronic Intelligence and Combat
- Tactical Radio-Engineering Anti-Aircraft Defense Forces
- Tactical Anti-Aircraft Missile Defense

Graduates of the Military Institute are awarded the military rank of Lieutenant and a state diploma.

== See also ==
- Budyonny Military Academy of the Signal Corps
- Military Engineering Institute of Radio Electronics and Communications
- Military Institute of Telecommunications and Information Technologies
