= Southwest Special Military District =

- Founded: 13 October 1998 – Present
- Country: Uzbekistan
- Branch: Uzbek Ground Forces
- Type: Military district
- Part of: Ministry of Defence
- Headquarters: Karshi

Commanders
- Commander of the District: Colonel Kadirjon Tursunov
- Notable commanders: Zainobiddin Iminov

The Southwest Special Military District (Uzbek: Janubi-gʻarbiy maxsus harbiy okrugi) is a military district of the Armed Forces of the Republic of Uzbekistan based in the city of Qarshi, Qashqadaryo Region. It serves the territory of Qashqadaryo Province, Surxondaryo Province, Bukhara Province, Navoiy Province. It was established on 13 October 1998.

== Structure ==
- Southern Operational Command
- 21st Brigade
- 22nd Brigade
- 23rd Brigade
- 25th Brigade
- 7th Brigade

== Commanders ==
- Lieutenant General Yuriy Agzamov (until 20 February 2000)
- Major General Yuri Filonenko (20 February 2000 - 20 September 2000)
- Major General Zainobiddin Iminov (until 23 November 2024)
- Colonel Kadirjon Tursunov (since 30 July 2025)
