= Tashkent Military District =

- Toshkent harbiy okrugi Ташкентский военный округ
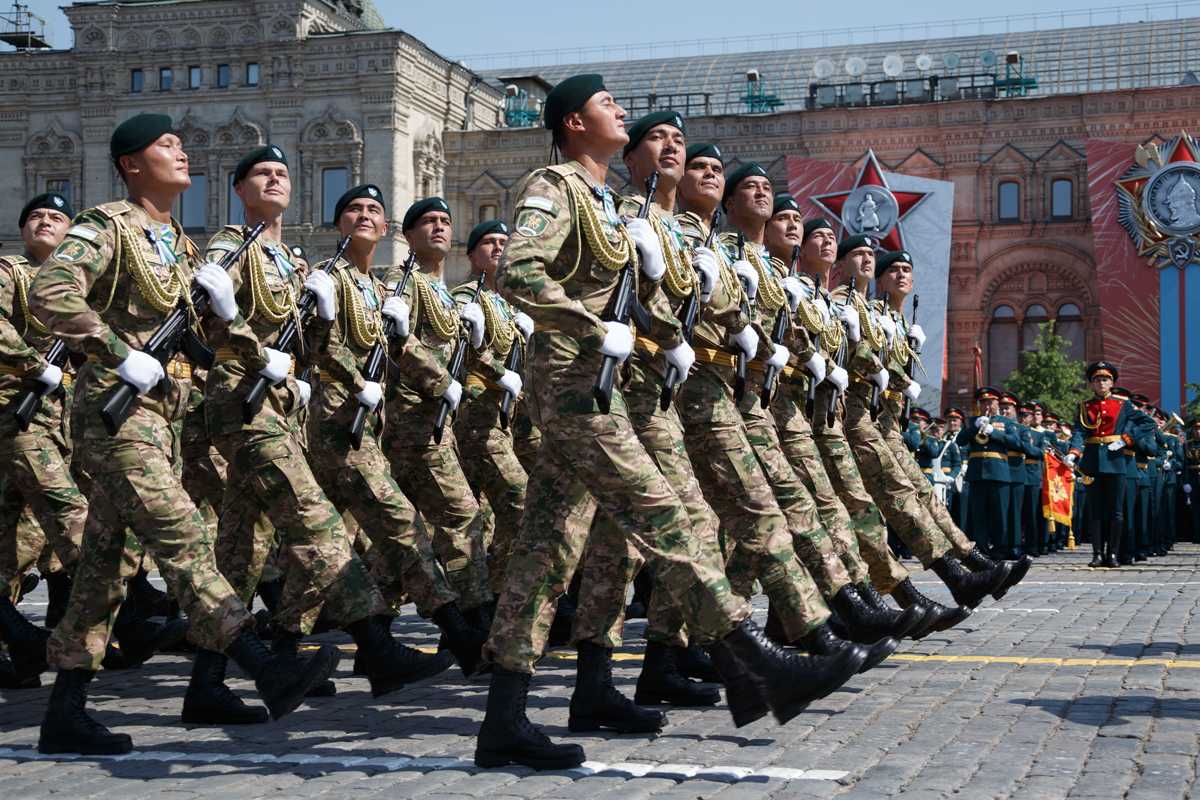
- Troops of the district during the 2020 Moscow Victory Day Parade.
- Founded: 2001 – Present
- Country: Uzbekistan
- Branch: Uzbek Ground Forces
- Type: Military district
- Part of: Ministry of Defence
- Headquarters: Tashkent, Tashkent Region
- Nickname: Tashkent Operational Command
- Accronym: THO; ТВО

Commanders
- Commander of the District: Colonel Zokirjon Sayfudinov
- Deputy Commander: Colonel Shokir Khairov

The Tashkent Military District (Toshkent Harbiy okruglar, Ташкентский Военный Округ), also known as the Tashkent Operational Command ("Toshkent" operatsion komandasi, Оперативное командование "Ташкент") is a military district of the Armed Forces of the Republic of Uzbekistan based in the capital city of Tashkent. It serves the territory of the Tashkent Region and the Sirdaryo Region. In accordance with the resolution of the Cabinet of Ministers on 9 January 2001 and the resolution of the Minister of Defense on 12 January 2001, the Tashkent military district was created.

== Structure ==
The District has over a dozen battalions and brigades assigned to the district and consists of the following formations:

- General Staff of the Armed Forces
- Honor Guard Battalion of the Tashkent Military District
  - Ground Forces Honor Guard
  - Naval Honor Guard
  - Air Forces Honor Guard
- Engineering Brigade
- Special Forces Brigade
- Separate Reconnaissance Battalion
- National Guard Brigade
- Special Purpose Brigade "Kalkon" ("Shield")
- Material Support Battalion
- Andijan Special Forces Battalion (Andijan)
- 1st Motor Rifle Brigade (Chirchik)
- 37th Motor Rifle Brigade (Andijan)
- 1st Separate Special Purpose Battalion
  - 1 Communications Platoon
  - 1 Material Support Platoon
- Communications Company
- Repair Company
- Physician Company
- Band of the Ministry of Defense of the Republic of Uzbekistan
  - Band of the Tashkent Military District
- "Tiger" Brigade
- "Bars" of the Ministry of Internal Affairs of the Republic of Uzbekistan
- Jaguar Brigade of the National Security Service of the Republic of Uzbekistan
- "Burgut" of the National Security Service of the Republic of Uzbekistan
- Training Regiment (Chirchik)

== Leadership ==
The following people manage the activities of the district:

- Commander of District – Colonel Zokirjon Sayfudinov
- First Deputy Commander/Chief of Staff – Colonel Shokir Khairov
- Deputy Commander for Logistics – Otabek Abdurakhmonov
- Deputy Commander of the Armament Command – Oybek Ismoilov
- Deputy Commander for Combat Training – Shukhratjon Otakuzyev
- Deputy Commander for Patriotic, Spiritual and Moral Education with Youth – Bakhtiyor Uralbaev

=== List of commanders ===
- Colonel General Bahodir Tashmatov (2 May 2001 – 17 May 2005)
- Major General Akmaljon Kamilov (22 June 2005 – 9 October 2008)
- Lieutenant General Viktor Makhmudov (9 October 2008 – 9 June 2010)
- Colonel Rustam Khalilov (3 June 2010 – 25 July 2012)
- Colonel Lutfullo Buzrukov (26 July 2012 – 13 January 2018)
- Major General Bakhodir Kurbanov (13 February 2018 – 11 February 2019)
- Colonel Zokirjon Sayfudinov (since 21 March 2019)
