= Military Medical Academy of the Armed Forces of Uzbekistan =

Specialized educational institution

The Military Medical Academy of the Armed Forces of Uzbekistan (Uzbek: O'zbekiston Qurolli Kuchlari harbiy-tibbiyot akademiyasi) is a specialized educational institution in the Armed Forces of Uzbekistan, under the Education System of the Ministry of Defense in Tashkent. It trains officers of medical services and medical officers of the reserve. Cadets who graduate with a bachelor's degree at the academy are initially awarded the military rank of "lieutenant of medical service" and are issued a diploma in the specialty "military doctor".

== History ==
It was established on 22 October 2020 by order of President Shavkat Mirziyoyev. It was formed from the former Military Medical Faculty of the Tashkent Medical Academy. With a government resolution on June 10, 2012, the Military Medical Faculty was established. It was located on the campus of academy, in an adapted two-story building, having its own territory, drill ground, warehouse and garage.

== Tasks ==
The main tasks of the academy are:

- Training and retraining personnel in military medicine for ministries and departments within the Armed Forces of Uzbekistan.
- Training scientific-pedagogical personnel, as well as reserve officers of the medical service.
- Conducting research work aimed at solving existing problems in the practice of military medicine.
- Conducting scientific research on the development of the educational process in the field of healthcare.

== See also ==
- S. M. Kirov Military Medical Academy
- Uniformed Services University of the Health Sciences
