= Northwest Military District =

- Founded: 2000 – Present
- Country: Uzbekistan
- Branch: Uzbek Ground Forces
- Type: Military district
- Part of: Ministry of Defence
- Headquarters: Nukus, Republic of Karakalpakstan
- Nickname(s): Northwest Operational Command

Commanders
- Commander of the District: Colonel Farhodjon Shermatov

The Northwest Military District (Uzbek: Шимоли-ғарбий ҳарбий округи, romanized: Şimoli-ğarbiy harbiy okrugi) is a military district of the Armed Forces of the Republic of Uzbekistan based in the city of Nukus. Nukus serves as the capital city of the autonomous Republic of Karakalpakstan. It serves the territory of Karakalpakstan as well as the Xorazm Province. It was established in 2000.

== Activities ==
=== COVID-19 ===
During the COVID-19 pandemic in Uzbekistan, military doctors from the district worked in the Nukus Higher Sports School for Olympic and National Sports (a temporary diagnostic, distribution and treatment center). The district also contributed to the organization of the center's activities and organized a temporary operational headquarters at the center.

=== Natural disasters ===
300 servicemen helped repair the dam of the Sardaba Reservoir in the Sirdaryo Region.

== Assets ==
=== Sergeant's School ===
In 2007, a fifth sergeant training school was opened in the Northwest Military District. At the school, specialists in 12 specialties are trained.

=== Nukus Training Ground ===
The district operates Nukus Training Ground, which is used by the troops of the Ministry of Defense, the Border Troops and the National Guard to conduct practical exercises. On 3 December 2020, a ceremony was held to open the newly renovated training ground. Defense Minister Bakhodir Kurbanov in his speech on the occasion states it "will be an international training ground meeting the most modern requirements" and that it occupies "a worthy place among the authoritative training grounds of the national army". Construction work took place at 13 military and social facilities of the Nukus training ground, including two residential buildings and an educational building.

=== District schools ===
17 support schools are merged into the military district and operate under military command. In particular, School No. 35 in the Kungrad district was one of the first to be under the command of the military district.

== Leadership ==
- Commander - Colonel Farhodjon Shermatov
- Deputy Commander for Armaments - Lieutenant Colonel Ayubjon Rustamov
- Deputy Commander for Educational and Ideological Work - Colonel Ulugbek Dusmatov

== Links ==
- Official Website (in Russian)
- Official Website (in Uzbek Latin)
