= Bakhodir Kurbanov (general) =

Uzbek general

Colonel General Bakhodir Kurbanov
- Bahodir Qurbonov; Баходир Курбанов
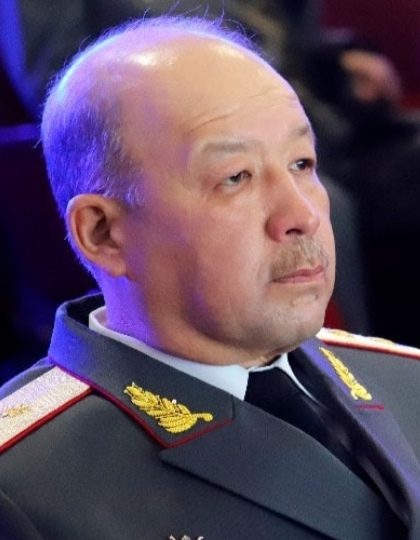
- Kurbanov in 2021
- Born: July 29, 1969 (age 57); Zaamin District, Jizzakh Region, Uzbek SSR, Soviet Union
- Military career
- Allegiance: USSR; Uzbekistan
- Branch: Armed Forces of the Republic of Uzbekistan
- Service years: 1987–present
- Rank: Colonel General
- Commands: Ministry of Defense of Uzbekistan (2019–2024); State Security Service of Uzbekistan (from 2024)

Colonel General Bakhodir Nizamovich Kurbanov (Uzbek: Bahodir Nizomovich Qurbonov, Баходир Низамович Курбанов) is an Uzbek military leader who has served as the Chairman of the State Security Service of Uzbekistan since 2024.

== Life and career ==
Kurbanov was born in late 1969 in the Jizzakh Region. From 1987 to 1989, he served in the Soviet Army. After the fall of the Soviet Union in 1991, he enrolled in the Academy of the Ministry of Internal Affairs of Uzbekistan, which he graduated from in 1994. In December 2013, he was appointed to the post of Deputy Minister of Internal Affairs of Uzbekistan. In 2015, Kurbanov was appointed Head of the Main Department of Internal Affairs of the City of Tashkent. In the years that followed, he served in various positions in the internal services and military units of the armed forces, such as Commander of the Tashkent Military District.

=== Defence minister ===
On 11 February 2019, Kurbanov was appointed Minister of Defense, replacing Lieutenant General Abdusalom Azizov, who was transferred to the National Security Service. One of Kurbanov's first actions as defence minister was to chair a conference of the Chiefs of Defence of the militaries of Central Asia, as well as the Commander of the United States Central Command Joseph Votel. Since 15 August 2020, he has concurrently been the Chairman of the Mixed Martial Arts Association (MMA) of Uzbekistan.

=== Chairman of National Security Service ===
On November 23, 2024, he was appointed Chairman of the State Security Service of the Republic of Uzbekistan, replacing Abdusalom Azizov, and was ordered the military rank of Colonel General.

Chairman of Uzbekistan Football Association since February 22, 2025.

== See also ==
- Ministry of Defense (Uzbekistan)
- Armed Forces of the Republic of Uzbekistan
