= Shakarxon =

Shakarxon Kurbashi
- Native name: Shakarxon Xoliqboy qizi
- Born: 1879; Poloson village, Oltiariq, Fergana Oblast, Russian Turkestan, Russian Empire
- Died: 1921

Shakarxon, daughter of Xoliqboy (1879–1921), was a woman warrior from Oltiariq who participated in the independence movement in Fergana Valley. Shakarxon was an active participant of the national liberation movement in Turkestan. She led a group of 500 people which became famous in the Ferghana Valley as Shakarxon's guard.

== Biography ==
Shakarxon daughter of Xoliqboy was born in 1879 in the Poloson village of Altiariq (Oltiariq) in a wealthy Xoliqboy family. His father was a craftsman Xoliqboy, and for many years he was an elder in Oltiariq market. When she grew up, she married Otajonboy, who lived in Qayragoch village, and gave birth to two daughters and a son. They built a new home in the village of Qairaghoch of Rishton and started living there. In 1916, Otajon died and Shakarxon became a widow.

== Kurbashi Period ==
In the summer of 1918, Shakarxon came to the village of Tashkurgan, to the house of the chief of Toychi for military activity. In this way, she led a group of 500 people who became famous in the Ferghana Valley as Shakarxon's guard. After Turkistan Autonomy was crushed, in the national liberation movement that started in Fergana Valley, her husband Otajon and a group of young men fought against the Red Army at the threshold of Kairagoch village, and the non-military combatants lost the battle. After the father and son Odilxon Shakarxon Xoliqboy were shot in front of their eyes, the woman, who had reached the age of 40, went to fight with a weapon in her hand. Fighting against the Reds together with Toychi Kurbashi, at the end of 1918 she freed the entire region of Altiariq from Bolshevik influence. The soldier Shakarxon was wounded in the chest and died in the battles of 1921. The daughters of Shakarxon Kurbashi named Adolat, Turgunoy and Lazokat later worked as modern and learned people. Today, her descendants live in the village of Poloson, Oltiariq District, Fergana Region.
