= Boʻrbaliq =

Boʻrbaliq Boʻrbaliq (Uzbek) Burbalyk
- Town
- Location in Oltiariq District
- Coordinates: 40°19′29″N 71°22′09″E
- Country: Uzbekistan
- Region: Fergana Region
- District: Oltiariq District
- Town status: 2009
- Elevation: 480 m (1,570 ft)
- Highest elevation: 600 m (2,000 ft)
- Lowest elevation: 420 m (1,380 ft)

Population (2016)
  - Total: 16,600
- Time zone: UTC+5 (UZT)
- Postal code: 151201

Boʻrbaliq (Uzbek: Boʻrbaliq / Бўрбалиқ or Burbaliq / Бурбалиқ, Russian: Бурбалык, romanized: Burbalyk) is an urban-type settlement in Oltiariq District of Fergana Region. It is located on an elevation of 500 metres above the sea level. Boʻrbaliq is known for the 18th-19th century "Doʻsti Xudo" mosque. The town population was 16,600 in 2016. In 2009, Boʻrbaliq was given urban settlement status. The local time is UTC(+5) (UZT).

== See also ==
- Eskiarab
- Rishton
- Farg'ona
