= Katta Turk =

- Town
- Location in Uzbekistan
- Coordinates: 40°39′46″N 70°49′31″E
- Country: Uzbekistan
- Region: Fergana Region
- District: Dangʻara District
- Time zone: UTC+5 (UZT)
- Postal code: 150500
- Phone code: +998

Katta Turk — is a town belonging to Dangʻara District of Fergana Region of the Republic of Uzbekistan. In 2009, it was given the status of a town.
