= Bagʻdod District =

Coordinates: 40.5040°N 71.2210°E

- District
- Bagʻdod tumani
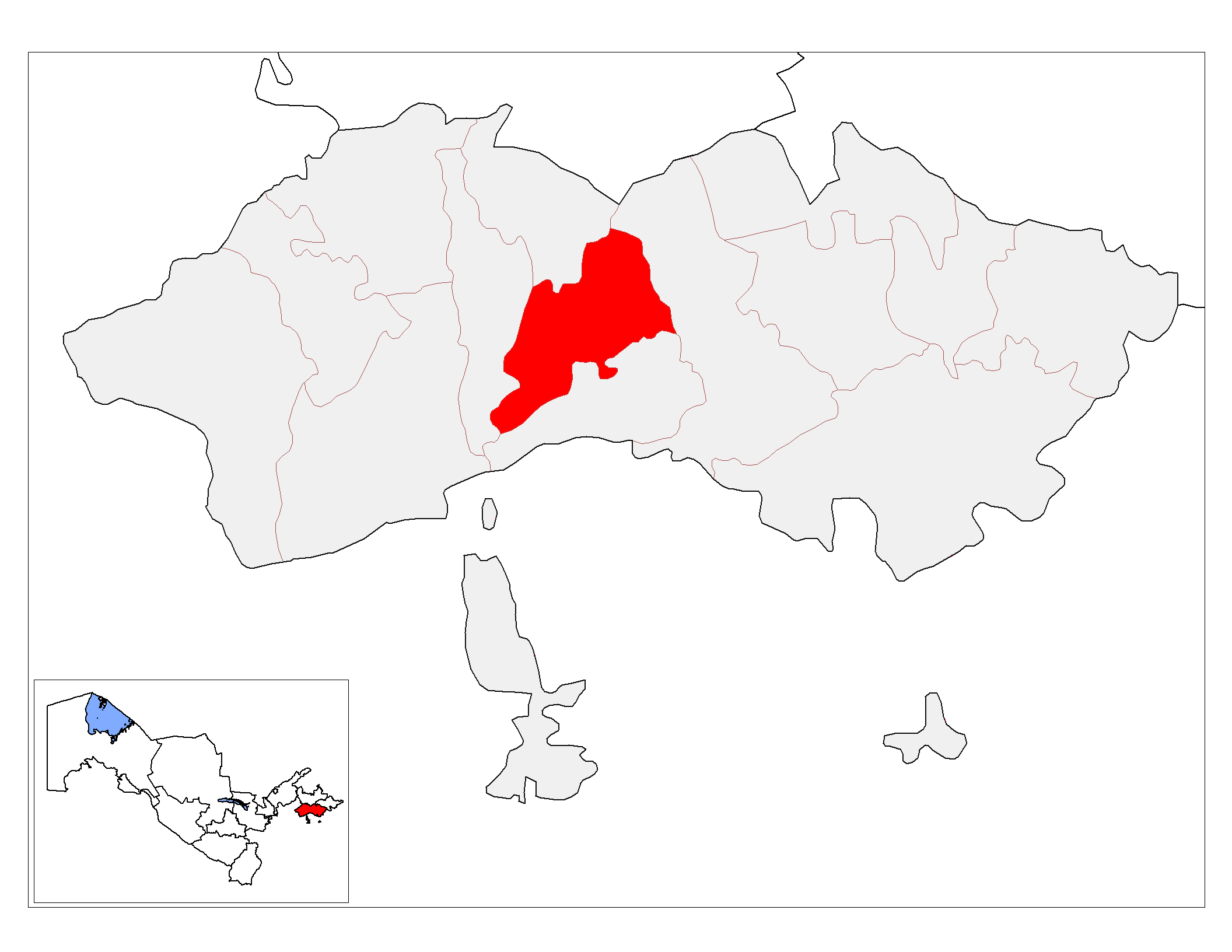
- Country: Uzbekistan
- Region: Fergana Region
- Capital: Bagʻdod
- Established: 1926

Area
  - Total: 330 km^{2} (130 sq mi)

Population (2022)
  - Total: 223,200
  - Density: 680/km^{2} (1,800/sq mi)
- Time zone: UTC+5 (UZT)

Bagʻdod District (Uzbek: Bagʻdod tumani, also Bogʻdod tumani) is a district of Fergana Region in Uzbekistan. The capital lies at the town Bagʻdod. It has an area of 330 km^{2} (130 sq mi) and it had 223,200 inhabitants in 2022. The district consists of 21 urban-type settlements (Bagʻdod, Amirobod, Maylavoy, Oltin vodiy, Bogʻishamol, Bordon, Doʻrmoncha, Irgali, Qaroqchitol, Kaxat, Qirqboldi, Konizar, Qoʻshtegirmon, Matqulobod, Mirzaobod, Samandarak, Samarqand, Oʻltarma, Xusnobod, Chekmirzaobod, Churindi) and 10 rural communities.

It was created on September 29, 1926, annexed to Uchkoʻprik District on December 24, 1962, and re-established on December 31, 1964.
