= Podsho Pirim Complex =

- Podsho pirim majmuasi
- Interactive map of the Podsho Pirim Complex area

General information
- Type: Architectural monument
- Location: Village of Bekobod, Buvaydin district, Fergana region, Uzbekistan
- Coordinates: 40.6287°N 71.1689°E
- Named for: Shah-i Jari (Imam Hazrat-i Shah-i Jari)
- Years built: 15th and 16th centuries (main structure), 20th century (some buildings)

The Podsho Pirim Complex (Uzbek: Podsho pirim majmuasi) is an architectural monument located in the village of Bekobod in the Buvaydin district of the Fergana region of Uzbekistan. The complex consists of a graveyard, a mausoleum, a darvaza-khana, and a shrine. The main structure of the complex is the mausoleum of Shah-i Jari (Imam Hazrat-i Shah-i Jari). Most of the complex was built in between 15th and 16th centuries, but there are also buildings dating from the 20th century.

== History ==
The Podsho Pirim complex consists of two parts. The first part is a transversely elongated rectangular courtyard with a portal-domed darvaza-khana of the 15th century and a frontally open mosque of the early 20th century at the end. The second part is a polygonal courtyard with burials and a mausoleum of the 15th-16th centuries consisting of two rooms (a room with a tomb and a shrine). The room has two entrances: one through the shrine, the other through a special low portal facing south.

The monument was repeatedly rebuilt and reconstructed. The oldest parts of the buildings of the Podsho Pirim complex date back to the 15th-16th centuries. According to the archaeologist Iskander Azimov, the mausoleum was built in the 15th-16th centuries. The poet Ziyauddin Khokandi in his verses addresses the mazar of Hazrat-i Shah-i Jari as the supreme patron of Fergana. In the history of the Kokand Khanate, this mazar is mentioned many times in different historical events.

In 1939, the archaeologist Yahya Gulamov, who examined the Podsho Pirim complex, noted the following:

The mausoleum of the mazar consists of two rooms: a room with a tomb and a shrine. The entrance to it is through the main portal facing west. The structure of the dome of the shrine resembles a madrasa of the 18th century. The room with the tomb has two entrances: one through the shrine, the other through a special low portal facing south. Apparently, this was the entrance to the mausoleum, which was closed after the annex or reconstruction of the shrine. The locals attribute the construction of the mausoleum to Tamerlane. The vast territory of the cemetery is covered with a salt crust. There are burnt tiles measuring 54x54x6 centimeters, characteristic of burials of the Mongol domination era in Central Asia.

== Architecture ==
The central part of this heterogeneous complex is the mausoleum of Shohi Jalil - a preacher of Islam in the Fergana Valley. After the death of the imam, the people surrounded his grave with reverence. Subsequently, a mausoleum was erected over the burial, and a cemetery gradually grew around it. The mosque, consisting of a rectangular hall and a three-sided veranda with an original painted flat ceiling supported by 44 columns, represents a characteristic type of Fergana cult building. The rectangular building (18 x 8 meters) with a one-sided recess is stretched along the north–south axis. The main entrance lies on the longitudinal axis and is not architecturally highlighted. The longitudinal-axial development of the two-chamber tomb, consisting of a memorial mosque (shrine) and a smaller chamber with a burial, is already noticeable by the external volumes.

The plan of the shrine is cross-shaped (5.2 x 5.2 meters) due to the deep lancet niches arranged in the plane of the walls, the gurkhona is square (4.3 x 4.3 meters). The interiors, decorated with ganch, are illuminated through lancet windows, in which pandjara (decorative lattice of geometric pattern) has been preserved. The wooden double-leaf doors are decorated with a shallow carved ornament. The facades are finished with clay-saman plaster.
