= Xotinariq =

Town in Fergana Region, Uzbekistan

Xotinariq Uzbek: Xotinariq Russian: Хотинарык
- Town
- Interactive map of Xotinariq
- Coordinates: 40°29′51″N 71°42′42″E
- Country: Uzbekistan
- Region: Fergana Region
- District: Qoʻshtepa District
- Time zone: UTC+5 (UZT)

Xotinariq (/khotinariq/) is a town belonging to Qoʻshtepa District, Fergana Region, Republic of Uzbekistan. In 2009, it was given the status of a town. The name derives from a word referring to a source of water.
