= Ancestral home =

Place of origin of one's extended family

An ancestral home is the place of origin of one's extended family, particularly the home owned and preserved by the same family for several generations. The term can refer to an individual house or estate, or it can refer to a broader geographic area such as a town, a region, or an entire country. An ancestral home may be a physical place, part of a series of places that one associates with state, nation or region. In the latter cases, the phrase ancestral homeland might be used. In particular, the concept of a diaspora requires the concept of an ancestral home from which the diaspora emanates. However, it is also possible that "[t]he family living in an ancestral home is surrounded by visible, physical symbols of family continuity and solidarity".

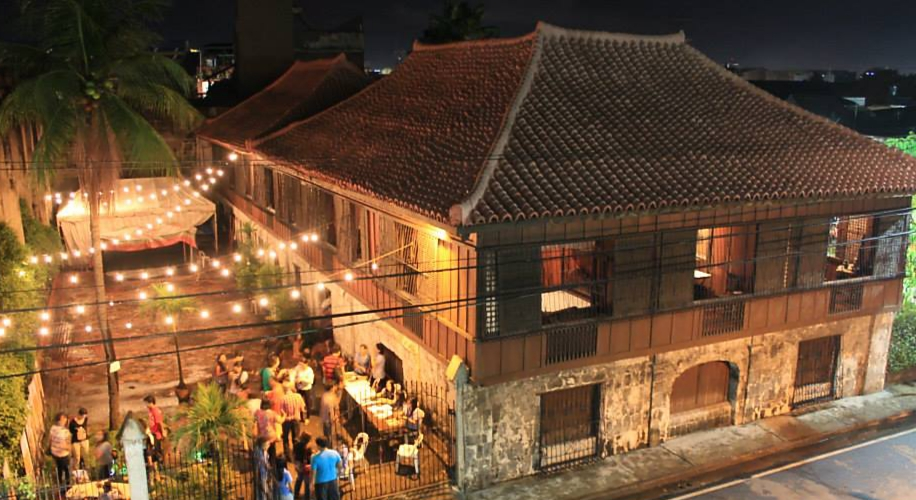
An ancestral home in the 'bahay na bato' style in Cebu, Philippines

== Ancestral homes and diaspora ==
Ancestral homes are considered by some social scientists to be central to humans' need to acquire a sense of rootedness and smoothly transition to and from different stages of life. People maintain their connections to their ancestral homes at a physical, cultural, symbolic and spiritual level, and these connections are explored differently by members of different generations of migrants. The existence of modern technology, globalisation and increased access to the internet through social media also allows individuals to access art, websites and depictions of their ancestral homes and homeland with greater ease.

Certain cultural groups have also found ways of engaging and caring for their ancestral homes despite physical separation or destruction in the wake of war or natural disasters. In the case of the Hyolmo, the destruction of their local villages in Kathmandu following the 2015 earthquake led some community members to rebuild their ancestral homes from rubble as a way of physically retaining a connection to their place. Some of the Hyolmo community members rebuilt a monastery in Tinchuli, one of the towns where they had resettled. Davide Torri, a social scientist, has noted this as the Hyolmo's way of keeping their heritage alive by finding and building a place for cultural and religious activities and maintaining a sense of community.

== Expatriation to ancestral homelands ==
The process of returning or finding a sense of engagement with one's ancestral home or homeland plays a role in the search for belonging and the creation of a sense of personal and cultural identity. Many people return home due to home ownership, strong nationalism or the desire to reconnect with old social relationships.

However, not all expatriates or those who return to their ancestral homelands are motivated by these sentiments. An individual's distance or closeness to their cultural roots can range from indifference to strong commitment.

People who return to ancestral homes often have to shift from one cultural frame to another or negotiate multiple identities including those from their host country or countries, as a result of their coming from the diasporic movement. Diasporas occur in both Western and Eastern countries and direct 'flows' of movement across the globe – for example flows of migration within the East, from East to West, from West to East, and from one Western nation to another.

The flows of migration between nations are also determined by the fact that economic opportunities are condensed within the world's largest cities, both in the East and West. Other social and political factors such as discrimination and the lack of opportunities for minority groups in foreign countries also drive the flows of expatriates returning to one's ancestral homeland. Thus, a return to one's ancestral homeland may be associated with the feeling of being included within a larger majority cultural group.

Research has found that the phenomena of relocating to one's ancestral homeland is motivated by a number of factors, which can include the desire to explore and to experience more of the world's cultures, the desire to flee from war or social and political difficulty in one's home country, the desire to build one's career in an ancestral homeland, or the desire to participate in their native land's economy or find greater economic opportunities.

== Ancestral homes and wellbeing ==
The need that the ancestral home fills in an individual's life is considered by some researchers to be a fundamental human need, that of having an attachment to a place and the meanings, experiences, practices and culture associated with it.

Ancestral houses and ancestral land are often associated with ancestral or native language, childhood memories, cultural dishes and cultural tastes, as well as familiar people and practices. These images are often associated with strong sentimentality or comfort for individuals across cultures. - reconnecting with one's 'roots' is considered a formative and significant individual experience by various social scientists.

The benefit that attachment to one's ancestral home offers an individual is, according to some researchers, the ability to integrate one's life experiences and attachments into a coherent life story or sense of one's personal self.

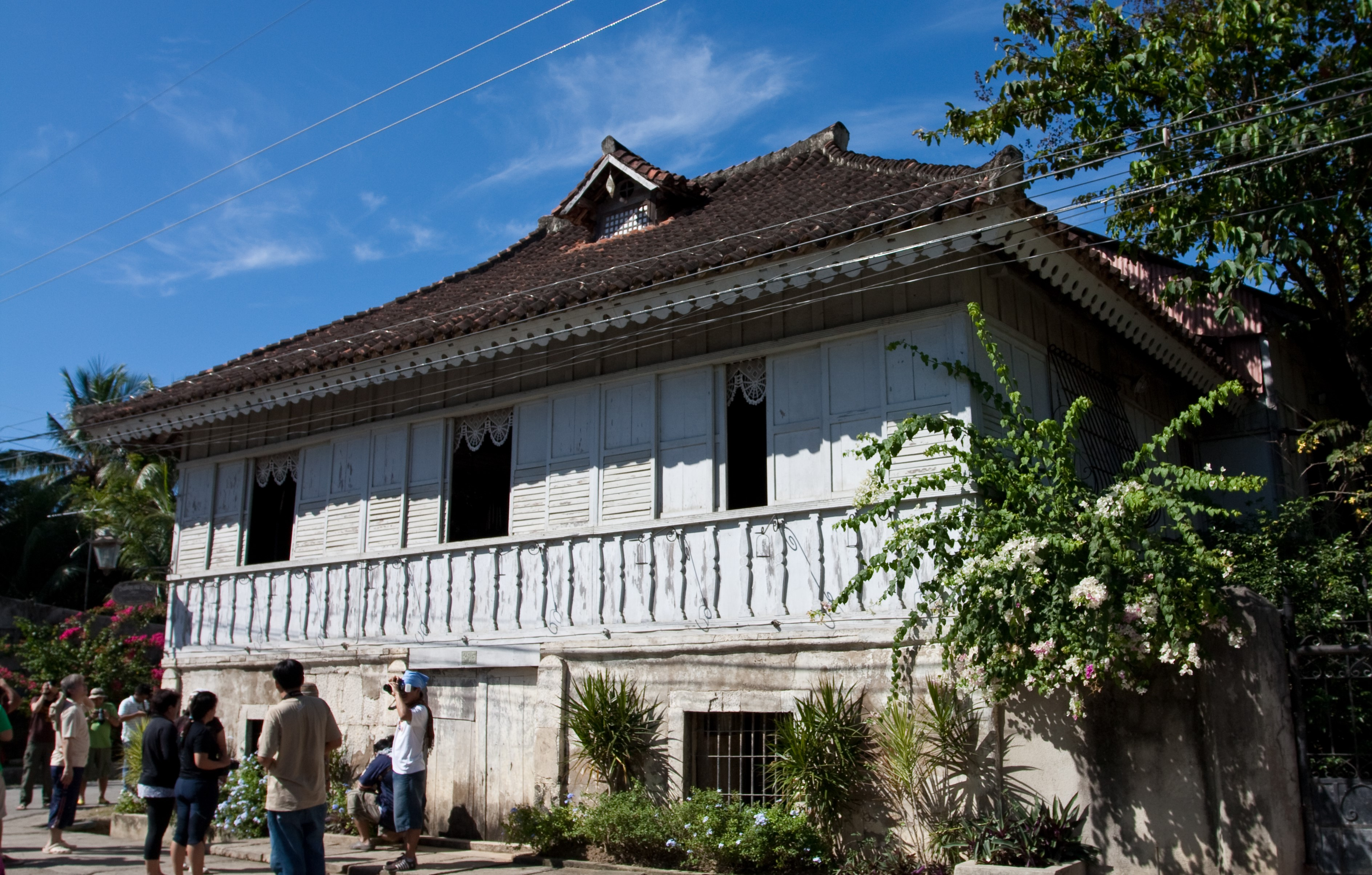
A "bahay na bato" style ancestral home in Cebu, Philippines, which is also a popular tourist destination

== Ancestral homes and tourism ==
Ancestral homes have played a key part in driving tourism internationally, particularly between host countries and countries of origin and/or birth in multiple diasporas. Tourism to ancestral homes is prevalent across the globe, especially in countries such as Scotland, the Philippines and China amongst others. Part of what drives the flow of tourism to towns, landmarks and cities with ancestral homes are migrants visiting or returning to their home cities, or later generations of migrants visiting their home cities. This may be part of attempts to connect to their cultural heritage or driven by other factors.

Ancestral homes and ancestral homelands are a key part of tourism marketing, with nostalgia, the search for personal identity, the desire to connect with one's roots and the experience of one's ancestral heritage one key part of the narrative that social scientists have observed within tourists. Social scientists have found that these factors encourage repeat visitation especially among migrant tourists.

The motivations that draw other tourists to ancestral homes and ancestral homelands also include the desire to enjoy the aesthetics or the architecture of ancestral homes and the desire to experience the traditions of a culture that is not their own.

== Ancestral homes by culture ==
=== Ancestral homes in Indian culture ===
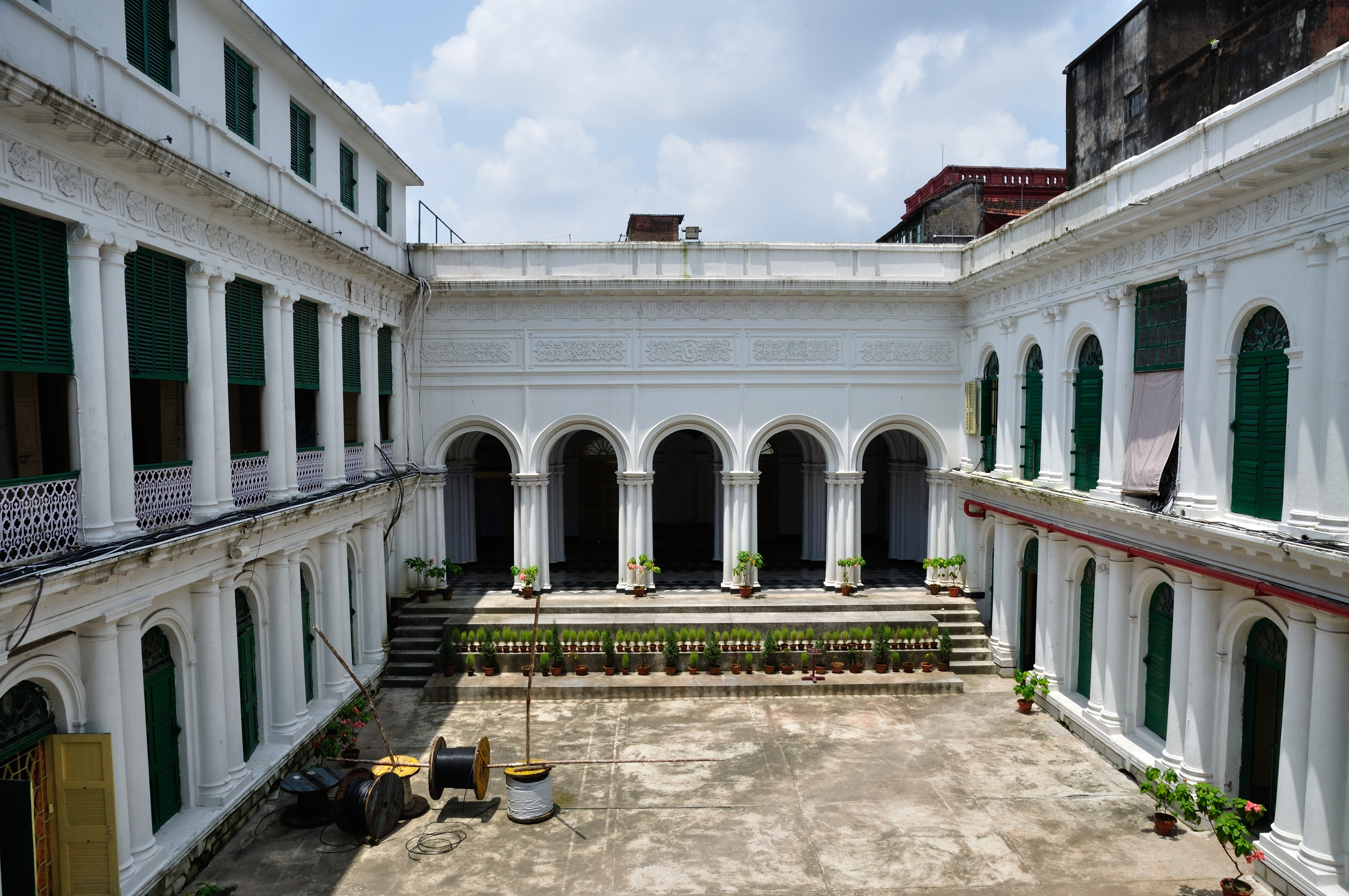
An ancestral home in Kolkata, India

There is a large range of ancestral homes in India, including more traditionally constructed ones, those constructed under colonial rule, and those traditionally belonging to members of higher castles or feudal estates. A notable type of ancestral home in India includes that of the Chettiar caste, who are a subgroup of the Tamil community. Chettiar ancestral homes are often large, ornate houses or mansions built to accommodate members of an extended family. These houses often consist of two floors, and were traditionally built to segregate men and women, with women's domain being the inside of the home and household chores, and the men's being the outer chambers to facilitate business deals and other public affairs. In line with their cultural practice of Hinduism, doorways of the home are often decorated with images of Hindu deities, and specific rooms of the home are used for worship.

Indian ancestral homes also include the homes of former feudal lords, or talukdars, which were lost, or mostly vacated, during the 1947 India-Pakistan split. These homes have been subject to multiple court disputes, with many heirs struggling to regain possession of these properties.

In Kerala, a south-western Indian state, ancestral homes are constructed using native materials including wood, mud, bamboo and straw. Ancestral homes in this region do not follow traditionally ornate styles of architecture, but is instead constructed for functionality and according to the rules of the Mansara, an ancient Hindu system that likens the pattern of the house's construction to a mandala. According to local cultural practice, an ancestral home in a mandala pattern represents a link between creatures and the divine, or the universe. Decorative features are minimalistic in these houses, unlike temples or other places of worship. These simpler and more traditional architectural styles have natural ways of conserving energy, including wind catchers, temperature regulation and rainwater irrigation as well as protection from the elements.

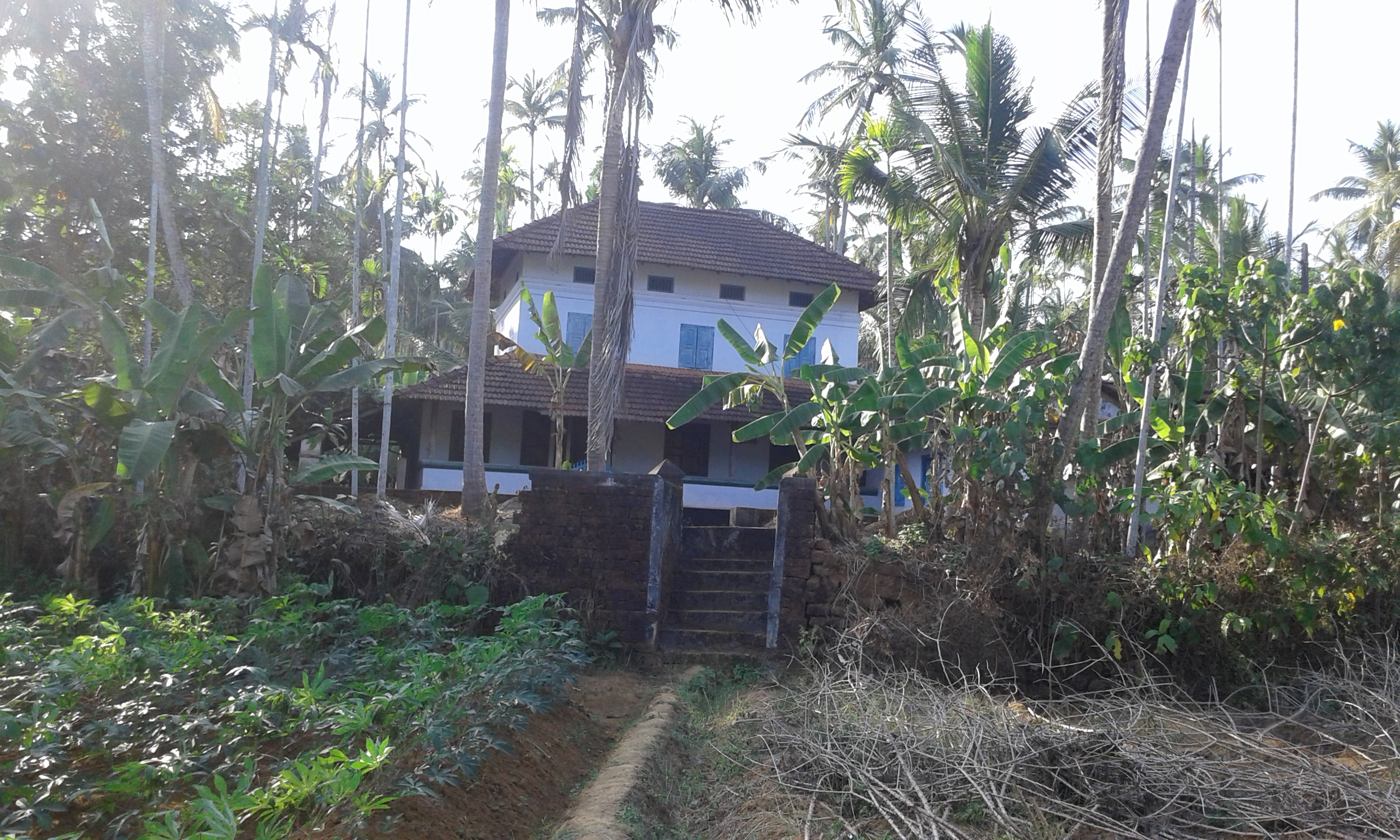
A traditionally constructed home in Kerala.

=== Ancestral homes in Chinese culture ===
Ancestral homes are important in Chinese culture and society. There are sources that specifically describe these as the home of the patriline. Research shows that these home-place identities are crucial in identity negotiations and identity processes in the country. Aside from speaking the Chinese language and "acting" Chinese (e.g. the worship and veneration of one's ancestors), having an ancestral home in China is a key part of being Chinese for those who live overseas. Ancestral homes in Chinese culture often reflect each individual family's history, with each family including shrines for deceased family members and other memorabilia or significant possessions of the dead. Ancestral homes also often include photographs and paintings of family members, and artefacts from various periods of a nation and family's history.

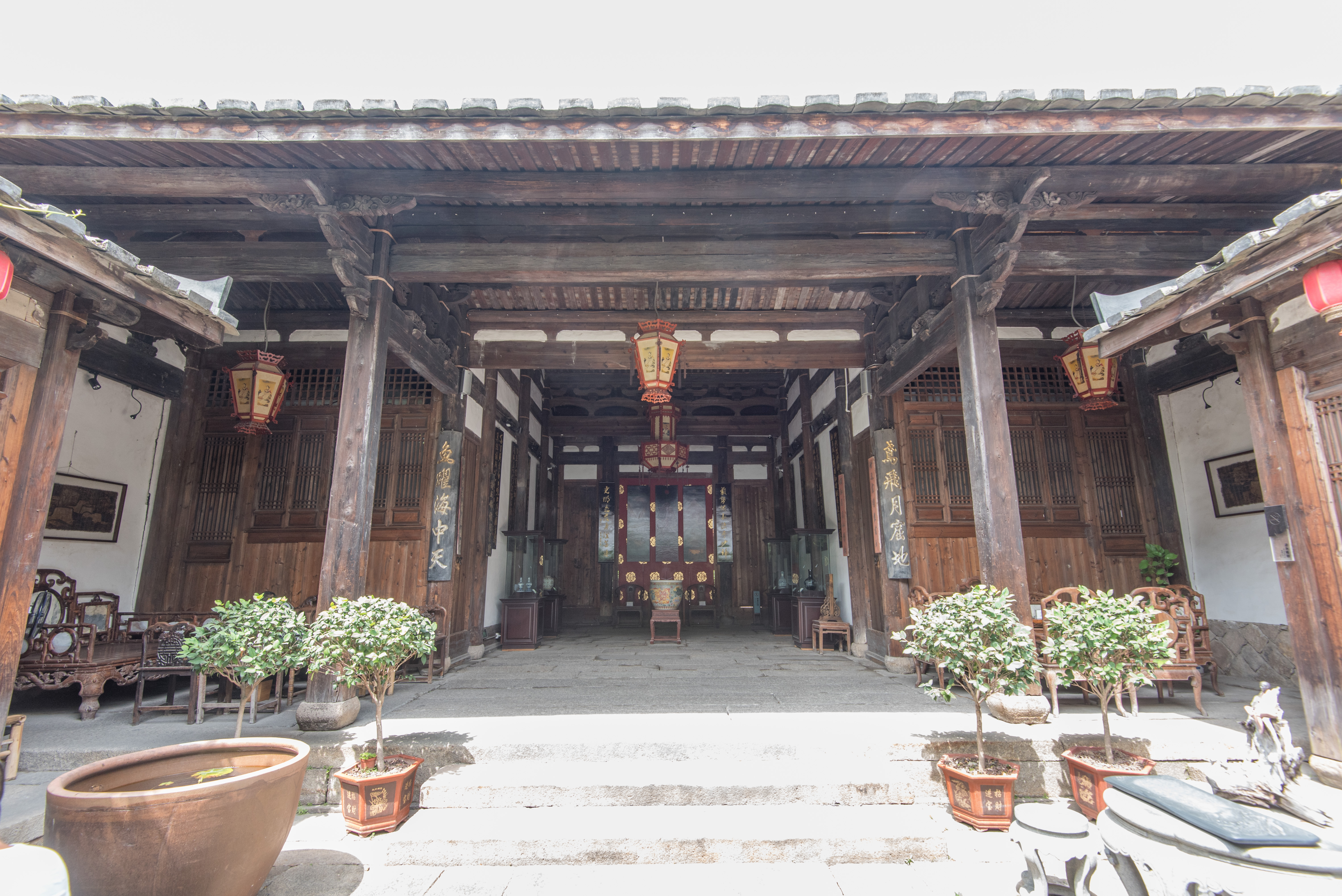
The ancestral home of the Xie family at Jibi Alley in China

A traditional structure of Chinese ancestral homes include having two separate halls, one private, to store artefacts such as ancestral tablets, and one public, for receiving guests. The internal and external structure and architecture of ancestral homes is often decorated according to the Chinese principle of feng shui, which is said to bring good fortune and keep bad fortune away from the family and home. Other structural aspects, such as the size of the halls, represented a family's specific rank in Imperial China.

Ancestral halls in Chinese culture serve a variety of purposes, including a play area for children, and also host significant events such as family gatherings, weddings, town meetings, celebrations, homecomings and even public punishment.

A recent phenomenon surrounding Chinese ancestral homes is the return of members of the Chinese diaspora to their native land. A factor that influences the return of Chinese migrants to their ancestral homes is the economic growth that occurs in one's ancestral homeland over time since migration, producing new economic opportunities that would otherwise not have existed. This leads Chinese migrants to look for employment in China itself, causing a phenomenon called self-initiated expatriation.

The experience of self-initiated expatriates is an experience that is often accompanied by difficult emotional and identity-related adjustments. Self-initiated expatriates often undergo a form of cultural adjustment and assimilation that differs widely according to individual circumstance and upbringing, or even familiarity with the language and local way of life. This experience can also often lead to the individual feeling either in an ethnic minority or majority, or be fraught with issues from a language barrier, discrimination, and a general difficulty integrating after living overseas.

Chinese ancestral homes are also established in countries outside of mainland China itself, notably in countries such as Malaysia. Notable ancestral homes include the Kee clan's ancestral home in Sungai Bakap, or the Tang Ancestral Hall in Hong Kong, which is approximately 700 years old.

=== Ancestral homes in Filipino culture ===
Ancestral homes in the Philippines are kept by generations of the same family. They remain an important part of the Austronesian Philippine culture as they tie large clans and families, which sometimes spread over vast areas and abroad with the wider Philippine diaspora, to a single home and origin. Ancestral houses are linked to the concept of ancestral hometowns, common throughout Asia.

Ancestral homes are a symbol of a family or clan's longevity and continuity, and serve as central meeting places for family reunions, and for specific events, rituals, ceremonies, and functions. The matriarch or patriarch of the family usually lives in this home, who manages its affairs; allowing for other family members in peril safe sanctuary.

Philippine ancestral homes are often either be of the bahay na bato architectural style (the colonial era architectural style popular between the 17th and 19th centuries: a mix of native-Austronesian, colonial Spanish and Chinese architecture concepts and sensibilities), the native Philippine-Austronesian wooden torogan or traditional bahay kubo and Cordilleran bale/fale styles which stretches back centuries before colonial rule; or a mix of a native base, with modern elements and extensions.

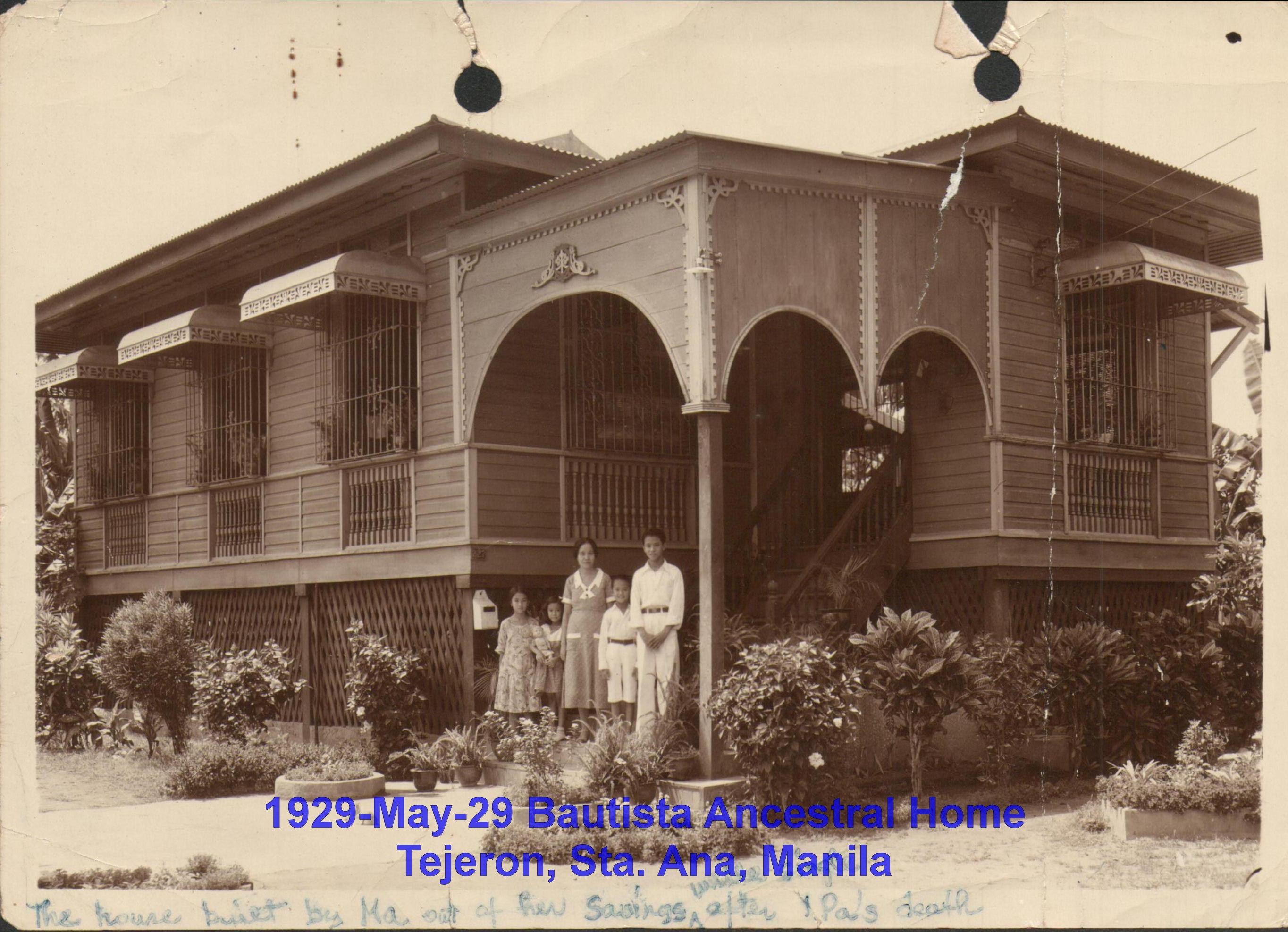

Some ancestral houses are listed as national shrines such as the Aguinaldo Shrine, the Marcelo H. del Pilar Shrine, and Rizal Shrines of Calamba, Laguna, Intramuros (old Manila) and Dapitan, Zamboanga del Norte. Many ancestral houses that have been well or pristinely preserved for centuries are designated as heritage houses by the Philippine Registry of Cultural Property.

A wider international community of Filipinos from the diaspora associate themselves with a pan-national Filipino identity, but the differences in language, architectural styles and sub-cultures from island to island contribute to great variability among the styles and cultures around different groups' ancestral homes and ancestral homelands.

Architectural styles vary greatly from province to province, or region to region. 'Bahay na bato' styles of Filipino ancestral houses have become a central part of the movement called 'heritage consciousness' by organisations such as Tuklas Pilipinas, which encourage greater understanding of, appreciation for and agency in the tourism and protection of ancestral homes by locals.

=== Ancestral homes in Hungarian culture ===
The Hungarians view their ancestral home as the Urals during the early medieval periods of the world. This is due in part to a Julian monk who found a Hungarian in the capital of the Volga Bulgar, and then took him to a Hungarian community living in the Urals. This interaction between the two was significant in Hungarian culture, and led to the establishment of the Urals being their eastern ancestral home. This territory was later known as Magna Hungaria (Great Hungary). This designation has been further used by modern historians and Hungarians living in recent times.

=== Ancestral homes in Thai culture ===
The traditional Thai house has acquired its own unique style after hundreds of years of evolution, made from wood and raised over pillars, it is adapted perfectly to its environment.

Different architectural styles are displayed depending on the region of the country, differing mostly in the kind of decoration and finishes that are used locally. Thai houses have in common, no matter in which area of the country are built, the manner in which their platform is raised over poles offering a shield against rough weather, wildlife and dirt.

=== Ancestral homes in the United Kingdom ===
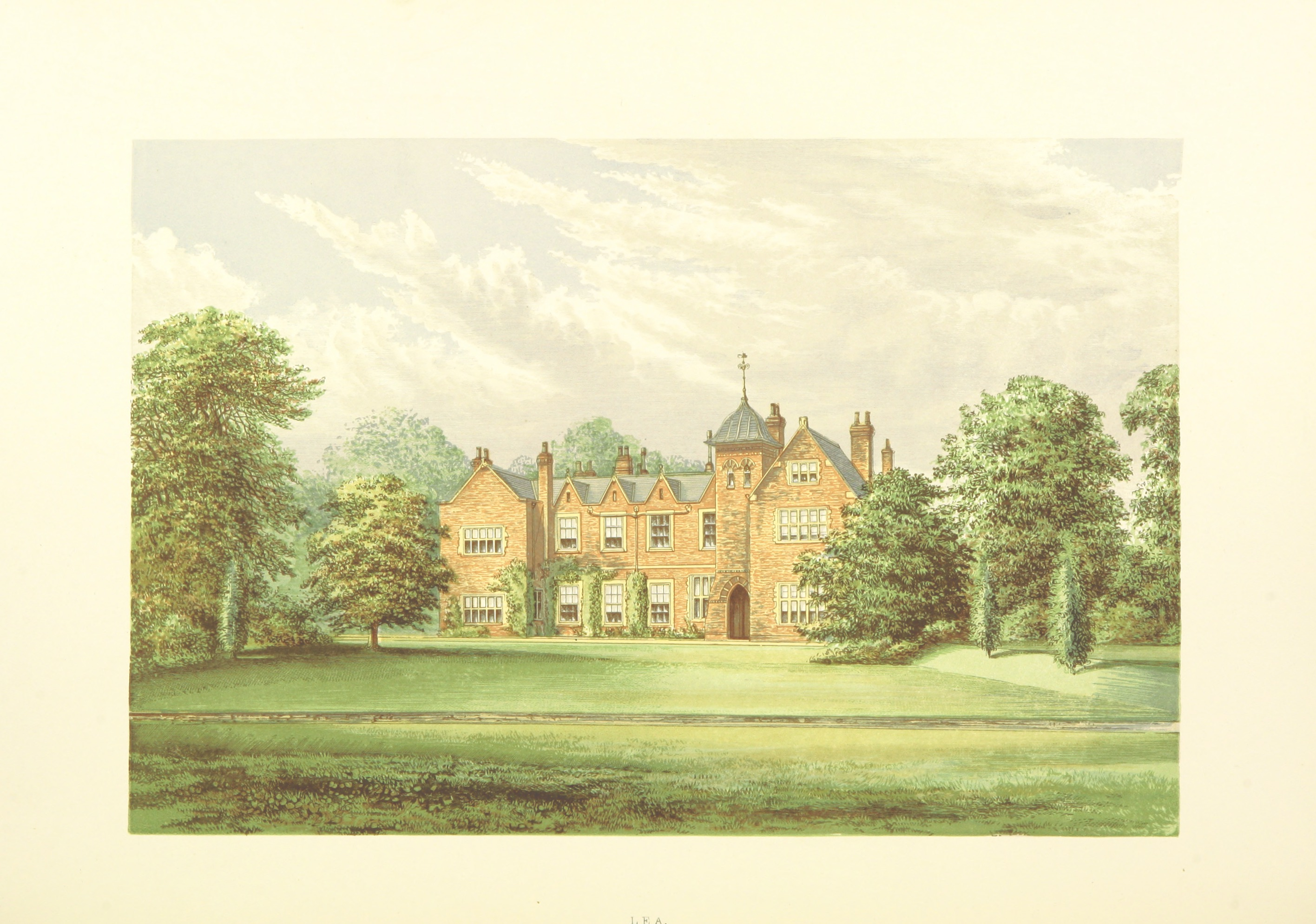
A painting of an ancestral home in Lea, Lincolnshire in the United Kingdom

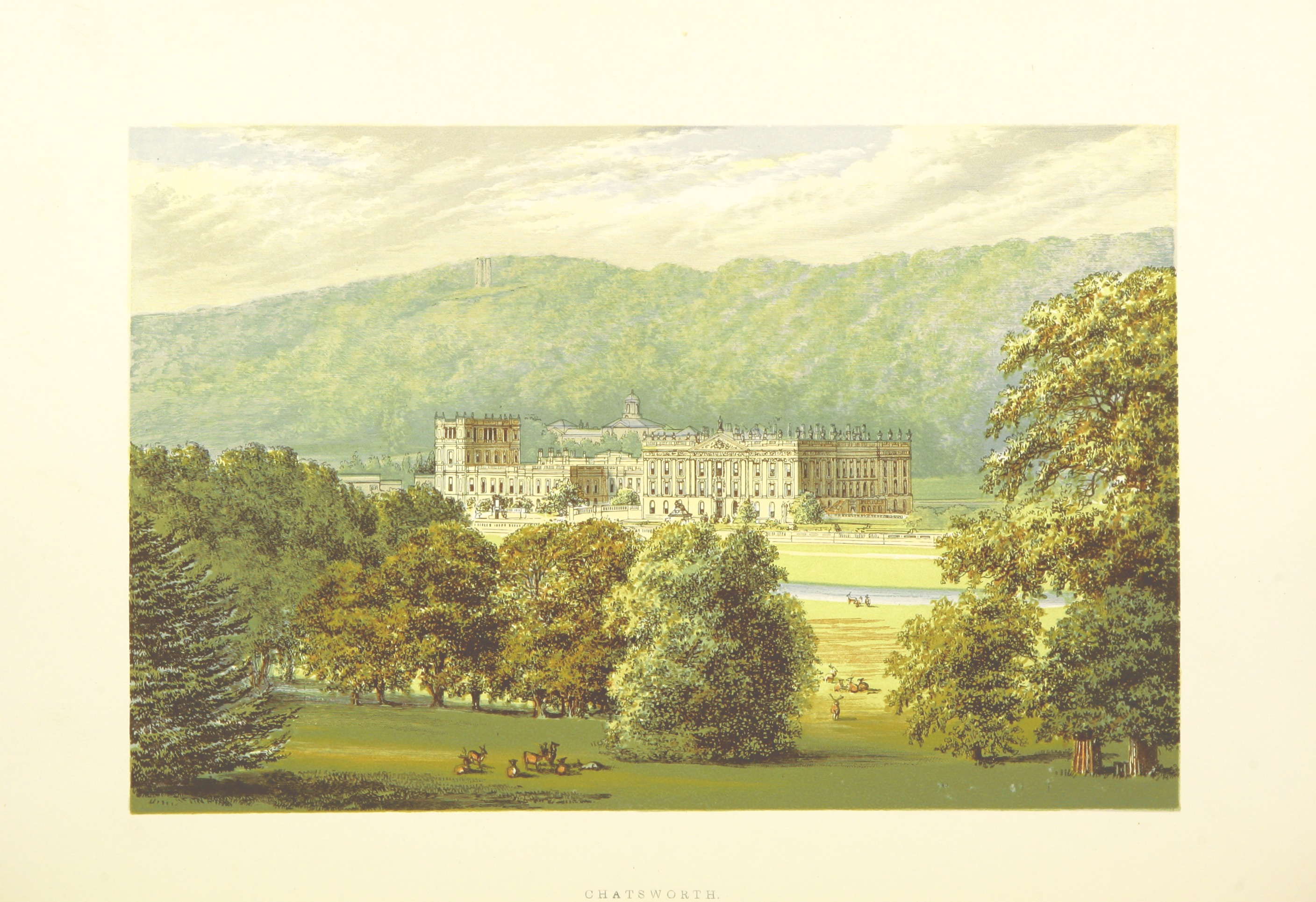
A painting of an English ancestral home in Chatsworth, Derbyshire.

One author has said of the phrase ancestral home that it "tends to conjure up images of European barons dining in chilly halls while dark portraits and empty suits of armor peer down silently".

It has been noted that "[the] term "ancestral home"—usually applied to manor-house and halls of the county—is far more applicable to [small] cottages", because wealthy families may die out or otherwise relinquish their land while poorer families continue to occupy the same homes for generations.

The British historical drama television series Downton Abbey was filmed in Highclere Castle, the ancestral home of several families, including the current Lord and Lady Carnarvon.

== Ancestral homes in contemporary culture ==
Ancestral homes are the setting for multiple works of art, both fiction and non-fiction. In contemporary Filipino culture, artists and entrepreneurs explore different uses of their local ancestral homes as part of the process of making art, promoting a family business, or tourism. The Pablo S. Antonio Residence in Pasay City, the Syquia Mansion in Vigan and Casa Gorordo in Cebu are examples of ancestral homes that have used art as a promotional tool for the tourism and reception of their family's legacy. Some ancestral homes, particularly in the bahay na bato style, have also been converted into bed-and-breakfasts, such as Casa Feliz in Sorsogon.

In international contemporary culture, The Hero's Walk by Anita Rau Badami uses her own family ancestral home as the setting of family conflict, drama and history.

Vikram Seth's novel as well as the Netflix Series of the same name A Suitable Boy, shows the neglect of the ancestral home of the Khans, a fictional family of feudal lords in the decade following the India-Pakistan divide.

== Ancestral homes and art ==
Art, particularly visual mediums such as drawing, photography, film and animation, can be used by individuals to explore their subjective experiences or memories surrounding a physical ancestral home or an imagined ancestral home. Researchers such as Edward Ademolu have explored the ways in which individuals' visual art surrounding their real and imagined ancestral homes can speak to wider discourses of meaning through its sensory and structural elements.

This UK based study did a content-based analysis of different drawings and imaginations of children of their "ancestral home" to get a better idea of their ideas of their heritage. There are many different African communities living in the United Kingdom that have family knowledge of their ancestral home, and this study allowed for researchers to evaluate what effect the ancestral home has on individuals. This, according to Ademolu, is an experience that is particularly valuable for those members of the British African diaspora that have had no physical experience of their ancestral homes or homeland and rely on the accounts of others.

== See also ==
- Homeland
