= Quva =

- City
- Location in Uzbekistan Quva (Uzbekistan)
- Coordinates: 40°31′29″N 72°04′12″E
- Country: Uzbekistan
- Region: Fergana Region
- District: Quva District
- Town status: 1974

Population (2016)
  - Total: 46,400
- Time zone: UTC+5 (UZT)

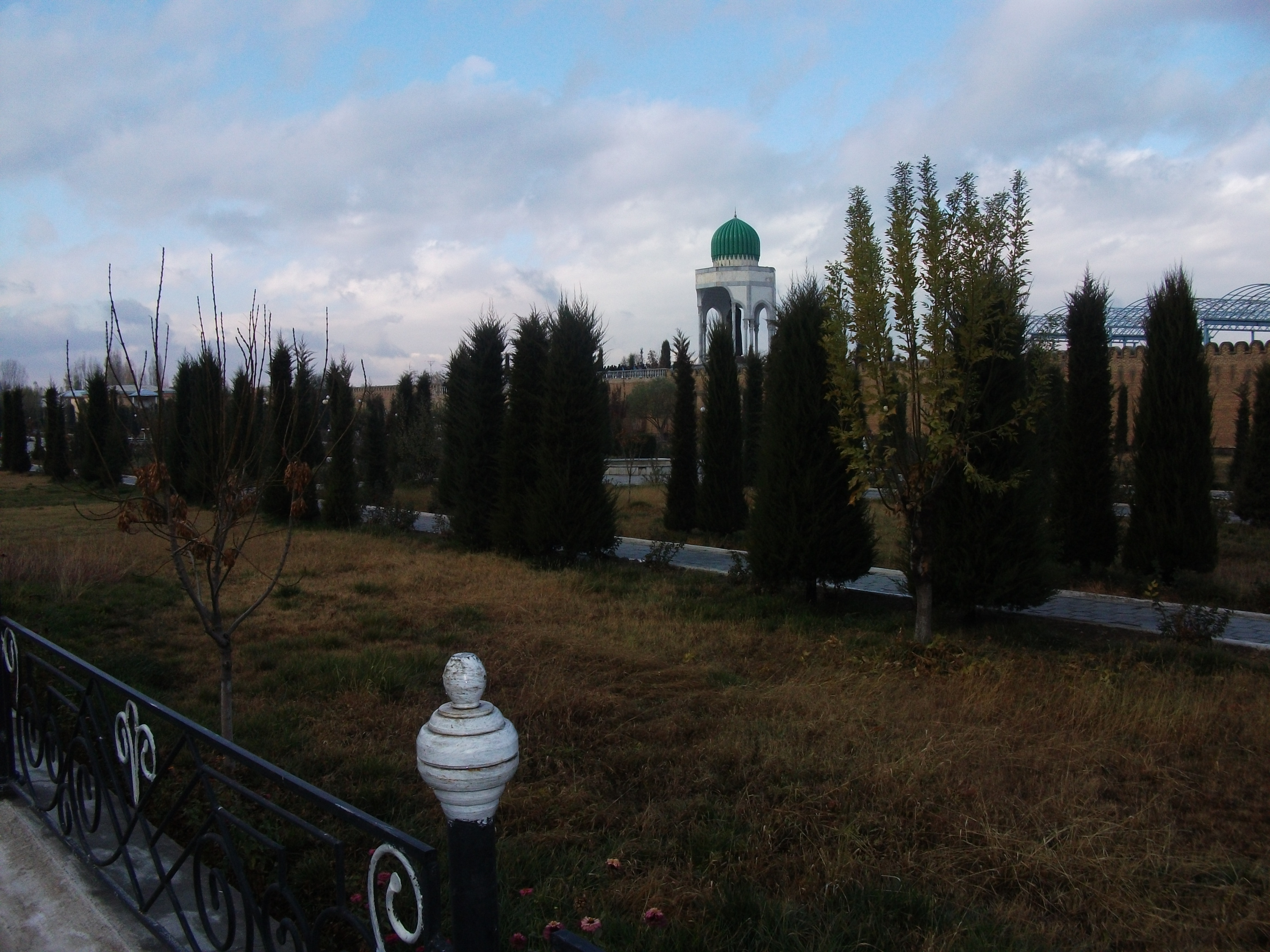
View of Park

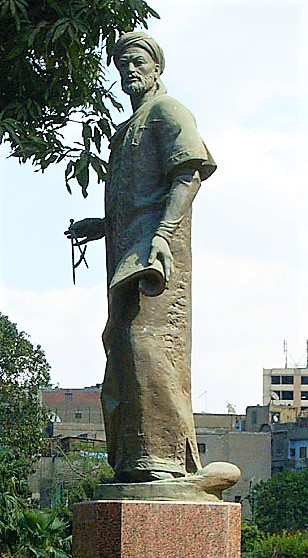
Monument of Al-Farghani in Cairo (Egypt).

Quva (Uzbek: Қува, Quva; Persian: قبا, romanized: Qubā; Russian: Кува, romanized: Kuva) is the capital of Quva District in eastern Uzbekistan. Quva is about 450 km east of Tashkent, about 46 km west of Andijan, and less than 17 km from the border with Kyrgyzstan. Its population is 46,400 (2016).

Quva is the birth city of Abū al-ʿAbbās Aḥmad ibn Muḥammad ibn Kathīr al-Farghānī (800/805–870), also known as Alfraganus in the West. Alfraganus was an astronomer in the Abbasid court in Baghdad, and one of the most famous astronomers of the 9th century. The lunar crater Alfraganus is named after him.

Quva is famous for its fruits, specifically pomegranates, cherries, and peaches. There is a large water reservoir called "Karkidon" (rhinoceros), as well as the South Fergana Canal in the territory of Quva. Quva neighbors the Marhamat District of Andijan Region.

Quva District is an administrative unit which covers the easternmost region of the Fergana Region of Uzbekistan. The administrative center is the city of Quva. The district was formed as part of the Uzbek SSR on September 29, 1926. In 1939, the village became the district center, and now the city of Quva, which was built on the site of the ancient Buddhist and Muslim center of Qubo.

The total area of the district is 437 km^{2}. It borders Fergana in the west and south-west, the Tashlak District of the Fergana Region in the north-west, Boz in the north, the Marhamat District of Andijan Region in the east, and the Osh Region of Kyrgyzstan in the south and southeast. The district's population density exceeds the national average, and the population as of 2004 was about 186,400 people (62.58% of the total population are women). With respect to nationality, the majority are Uzbeks, Tajiks, Tatars, Russians and others.

== History ==
The medieval city was known as Cuba City, according to studies based on Arab written documents dating from the 7th century to the 10th century. It was located along the old caravan road linking Kashgar and the Fergana Valley. Previously Cuba had been the second-largest of its kind in the area after the capital of the ancient Fergana Valley, Ahsiket, but in the late 13th century, the Mongolian invasion reduced the city to ruins.

The old town was composed of three parts: the citadel, the shahhristan and the rabbit (residential part of the city). By the Middle Ages in the Fergana Valley, Kuva had developed handicrafts, particularly pottery, goldsmithing, and metal treatment, making it a major economic and political center of the region.

The first archaeological studies of the town began as early as the 1950s when the Major Fergana Canal was constructed, but the greatest achievement was found during the 1956-1957 expedition.

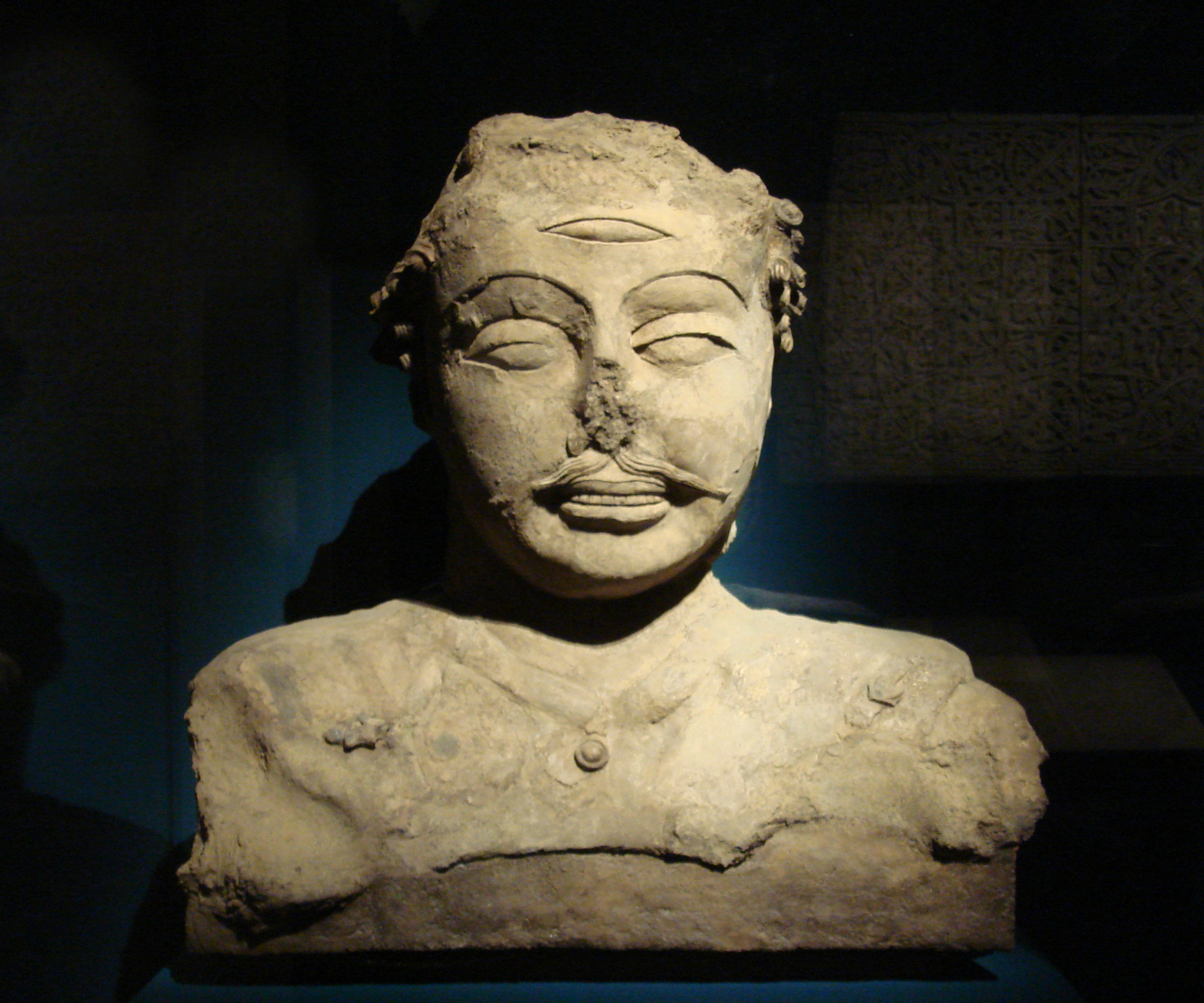
Divinity Weshparkar, 7th century, Quva (Ferghana), Uzbekistan.

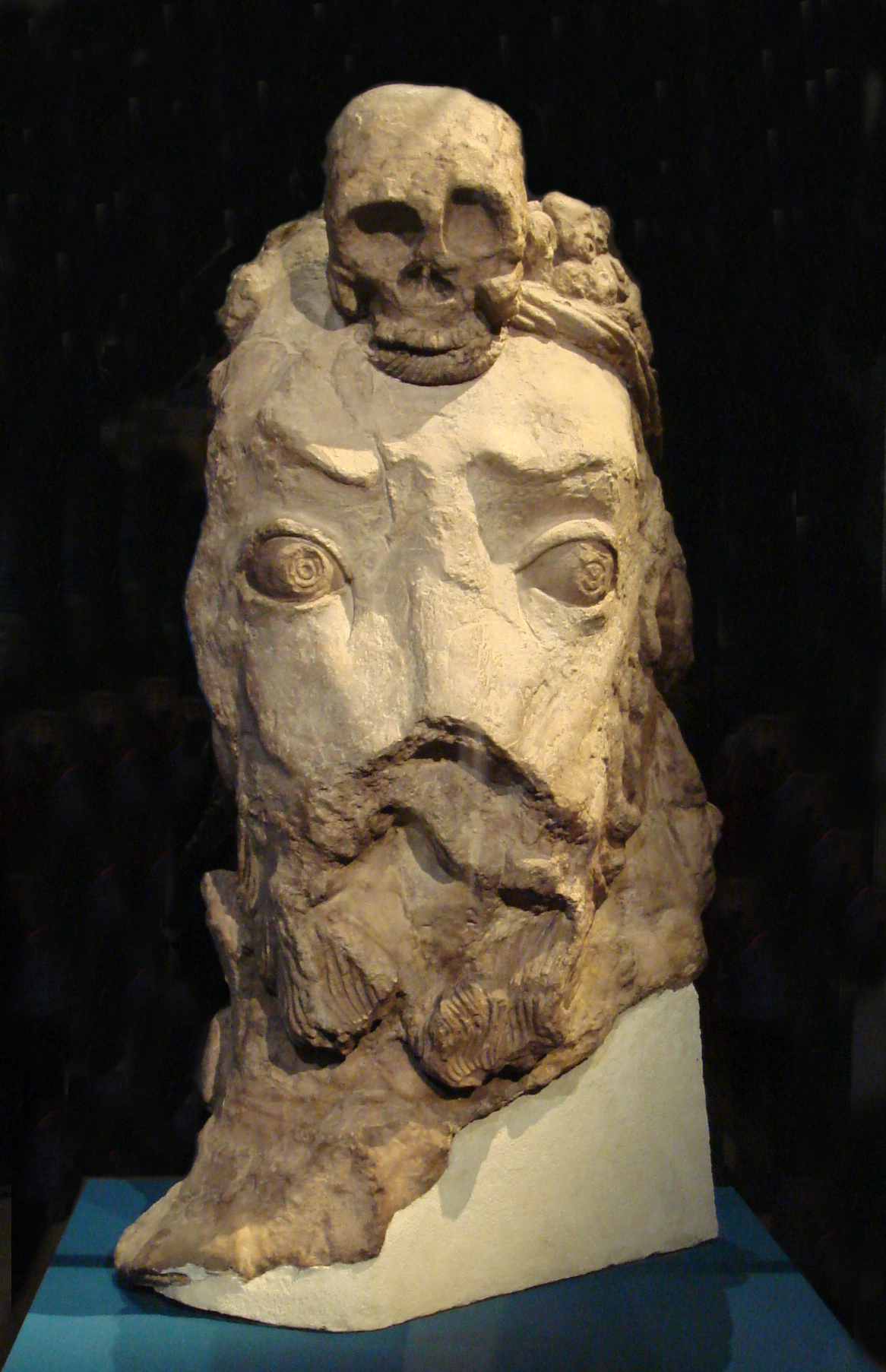
Head of a demon, 7th century, Buddhist temple of Quva (Ferghana), Uzbekistan.
