= Toshloq District =

Coordinates: 40.5270°N 71.8320°E

- District
- Toshloq tumani
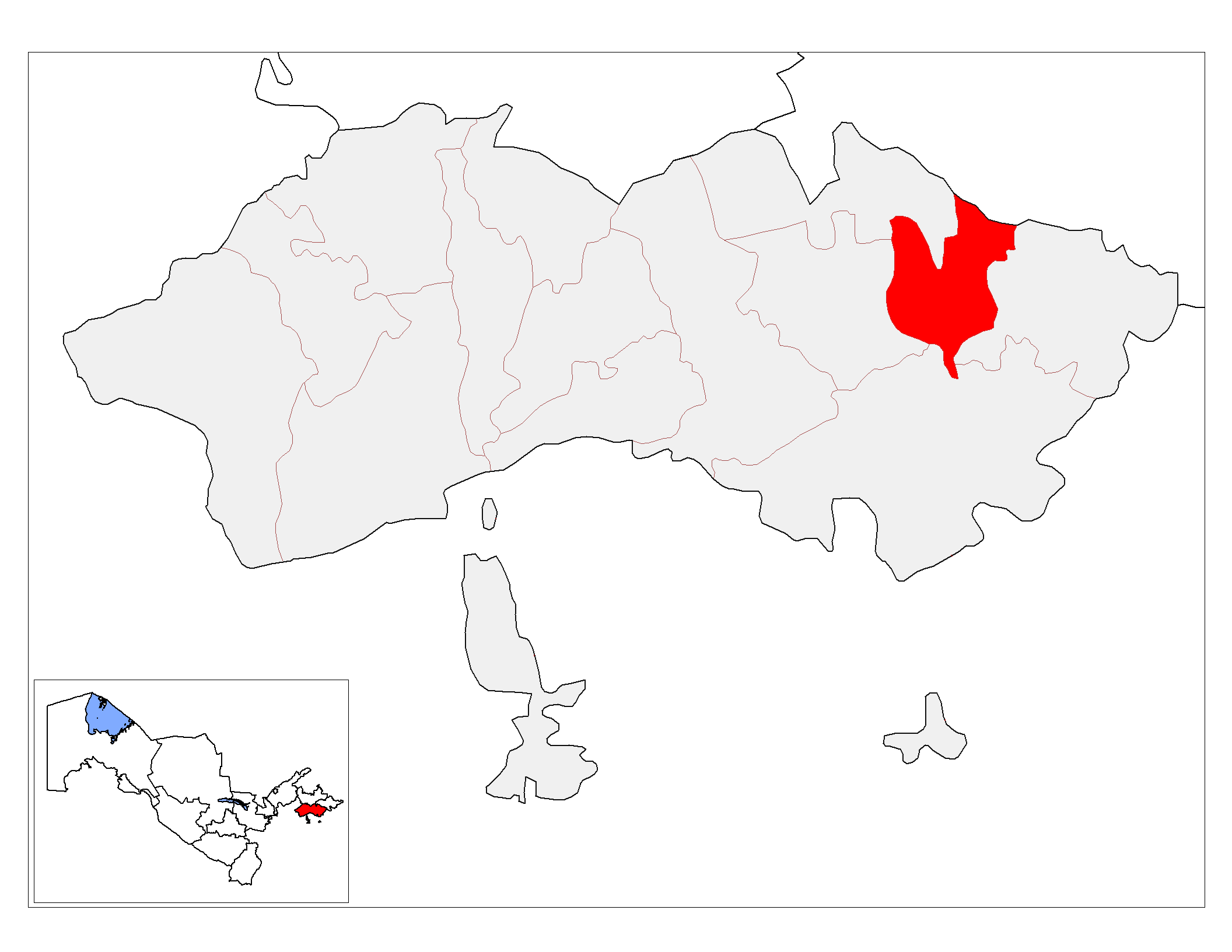
- Country: Uzbekistan
- Region: Fergana Region
- Capital: Toshloq
- Established: 1935

Area
  - Total: 240 km^{2} (93 sq mi)

Population (2022)
  - Total: 209,700
  - Density: 870/km^{2} (2,300/sq mi)
- Time zone: UTC+5 (UZT)

Toshloq District (Uzbek: Toshloq tumani) is a district of Fergana Region in Uzbekistan. The capital lies at the town Toshloq. It has an area of 240 km^{2} (93 sq mi) and it had 209,700 inhabitants in 2022. The district consists of 10 urban-type settlements (Toshloq, Arabmozor, Axshak, Varzak, Zarkent, Qumariq, Quyi Nayman, Sadda, Turvat, Yakkatut) and 10 rural communities.
