= Toshloq =

- Urban-type settlement
- Location in Uzbekistan
- Coordinates: 40°28′51″N 71°45′39″E
- Country: Uzbekistan
- Region: Fergana Region
- District: Toshloq District
- Urban-type settlement: 1974

Population (2016)
  - Total: 18,600
- Time zone: UTC+5 (UZT)

Toshloq (Uzbek: Toshloq, Тошлоқ, Russian: Ташлак, romanized: Tashlak) is an urban-type settlement in Fergana Region, Uzbekistan. It is the administrative center of Toshloq District. The town population in 1989 was 12,067 people, and 18,600 in 2016.
