= Bagʻdod =

- Urban-type settlement
- Location in Uzbekistan
- Coordinates: 40°27′38″N 71°13′17″E
- Country: Uzbekistan
- Region: Fergana Region
- District: Bagʻdod District
- Urban-type settlement status: 1979

Population (2000)
  - Total: 12,800
- Time zone: UTC+5 (UZT)

Bagʻdod (Uzbek: Bagʻdod, Бағдод or Bogʻdod, Боғдод, Russian: Багдад, romanized: Bagdad) is an urban-type settlement in Fergana Region, Uzbekistan. It is the administrative center of Bagʻdod District. The town population in 1989 was 10,086.
