= Qoʻshtepa District =

Qoʻshtepa
- District
- Qoʻshtepa tumani
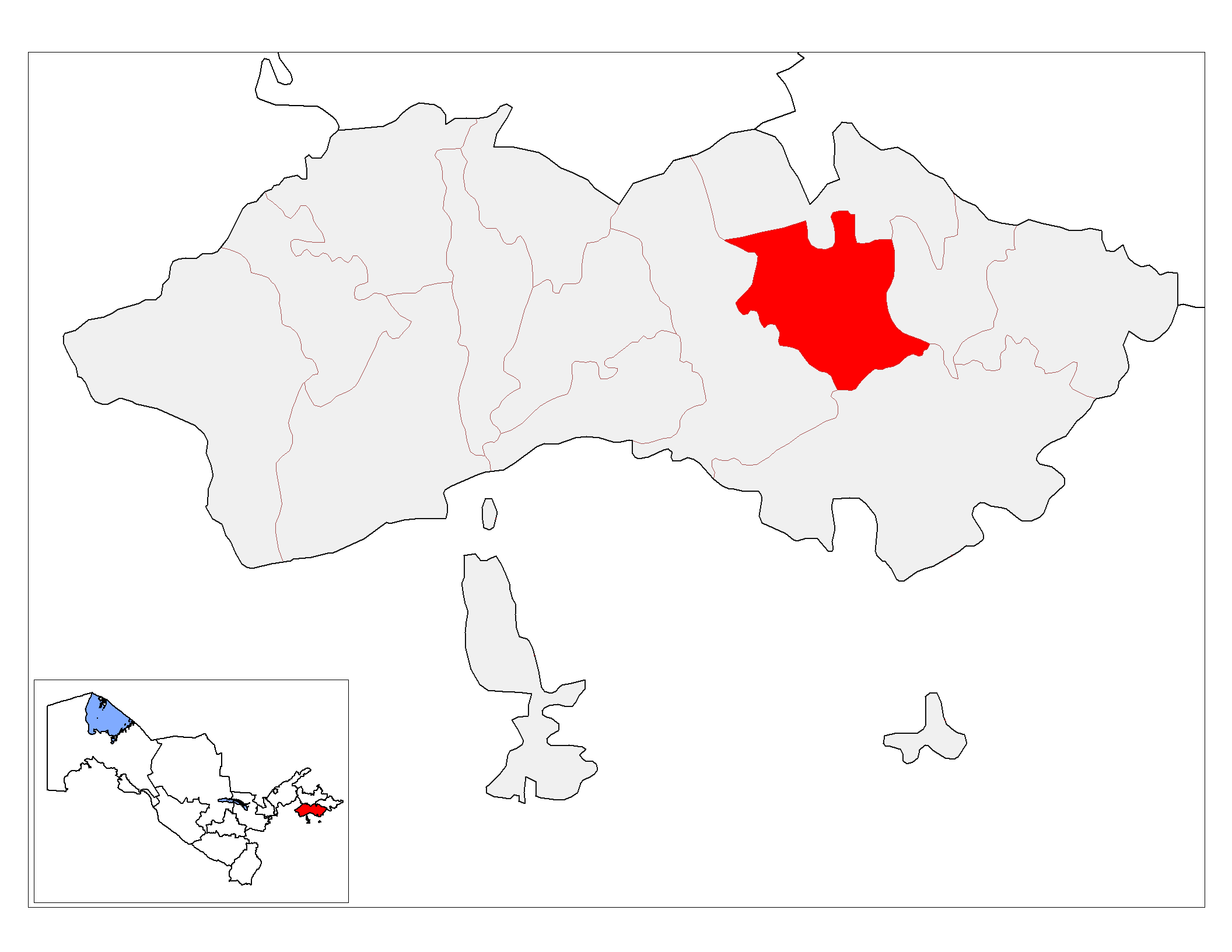
- Coordinates: 40.2698°N 71.9071°E
- Country: Uzbekistan
- Region: Fergana Region
- Capital: Langar
- Established: 1926

Area
  - Total: 370 km^{2} (140 sq mi)

Population (2022)
  - Total: 198,400
  - Density: 540/km^{2} (1,400/sq mi)
- Time zone: UTC+5 (UZT)

Qoʻshtepa is a district of Fergana Region in Uzbekistan. The capital lies at the village Langar. It has an area of 370 km^{2} (140 sq mi) and it had 198,400 inhabitants in 2022. The district consists of 14 urban-type settlements (Boltakoʻl, Gishtmon, Doʻrmon, Katta Beshkapa, Qizil ariq, Qorajiyda, Qorakaltak, Qumtepa, Quyi Oqtepa, Sarmozor, Xotinariq, Shahartepa, Eshonguzar, Yangiariq) and 15 rural communities
