= Navbahor, Fergana Region =

Navbahor
- urban-type settlement
- Location in Uzbekistan
- Coordinates: 40°28′51″N 70°46′15″E
- Country: Uzbekistan
- Region: Fergana Region
- District: Furqat District

Population (2016)
  - Total: 4,500
- Time zone: UTC+5 (UZT)

Navbahor (Uzbek: Navbahor, Russian: Навбахор) is an urban-type settlement in Fergana Region, Uzbekistan. It is the administrative center of Furqat District. Its population is 4,500 (2016).
