= Yozyovon =

- Urban-type settlement
- Location in Uzbekistan
- Coordinates: 40°39′43″N 71°44′35″E
- Country: Uzbekistan
- Region: Fergana Region
- District: Yozyovon District
- Urban-type settlement status: 1974

Population (2016)
  - Total: 12,800
- Time zone: UTC+5 (UZT)

Yozyovon (Uzbek: Yozyovon/Ёзёвон, Russian: Язъяван) is an urban-type settlement in Fergana Region, Uzbekistan. It is the capital of Yozyovon District. Its population was 7,458 people in 1989, and 12,800 in 2016.
