= Beshariq =

- City
- Location in Uzbekistan
- Coordinates: 40°26′09″N 70°36′37″E
- Country: Uzbekistan
- Region: Fergana Region
- District: Beshariq District
- Town: 1983

Population (2016)
  - Total: 22,800
- Time zone: UTC+5 (UZT)

Beshariq (Uzbek: Beshariq/Бешариқ, Russian: Бешарык, romanized: Besharyk) is a city in Fergana Region, Uzbekistan. It is the administrative center of Beshariq District. The town population was 17,289 people in 1989, and 22,800 in 2016.
