= Quva District =

Coordinates: 40.5233°N 72.0617°E

Quva
- District
- Quva tumani
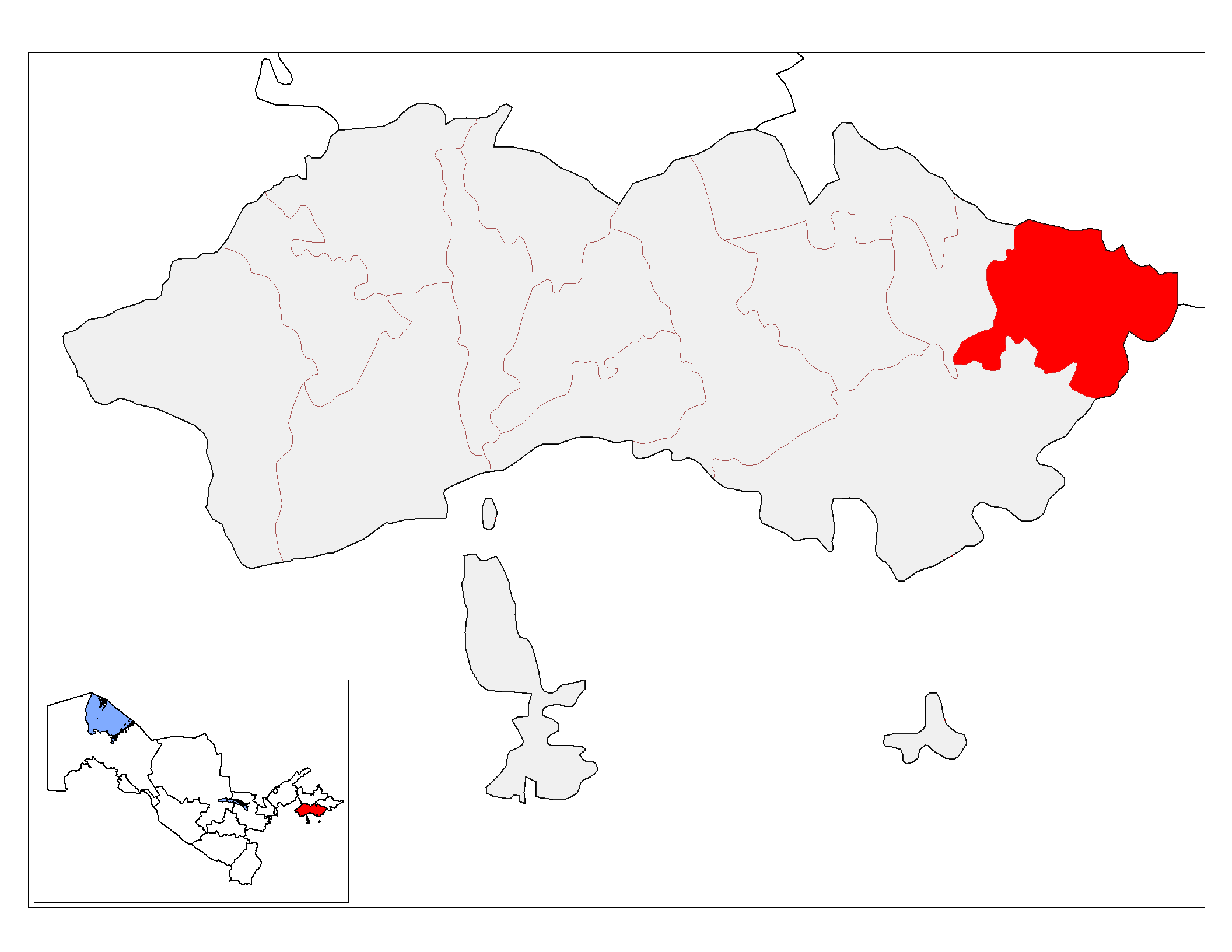
- Country: Uzbekistan
- Region: Fergana Region
- Capital: Quva
- Established: 1926

Area
  - Total: 440 km^{2} (170 sq mi)

Population (2022)
  - Total: 266,000
  - Density: 600/km^{2} (1,600/sq mi)
- Time zone: UTC+5 (UZT)

Quva is a district of Fergana Region in Uzbekistan. The capital lies at the city Quva. It has an area of 440 km^{2} (170 sq mi) and it had 266,000 inhabitants in 2022. The district consists of one city (Quva), 15 urban-type settlements (Sanoatchilar, Guliston, Damariq, Jalayer, Qayirma, Qaqir, Qandabuloq, Qorashox, Mustaqillik, Oltinariq, Pastki Xoʻja Xasan, Tolmozor, Turk, Oʻzbek, Yuziya) and 11 rural communities.
