= Langar, Fergana Region =

Langar
- Village
- Location in Uzbekistan
- Coordinates: 40°31′24″N 71°39′14″E
- Country: Uzbekistan
- Region: Fergana Region
- District: Qoʻshtepa District

Population (1989)
  - Total: 1,079
- Time zone: UTC+5 (UZT)

Langar (Uzbek: Langar, Russian: Лангар) is a village in Fergana Region, Uzbekistan. It is the administrative center of Qoʻshtepa District.
