= Beshariq District =

Coordinates: 40.4170°N 70.6160°E

Beshariq
- District
- Beshariq tumani
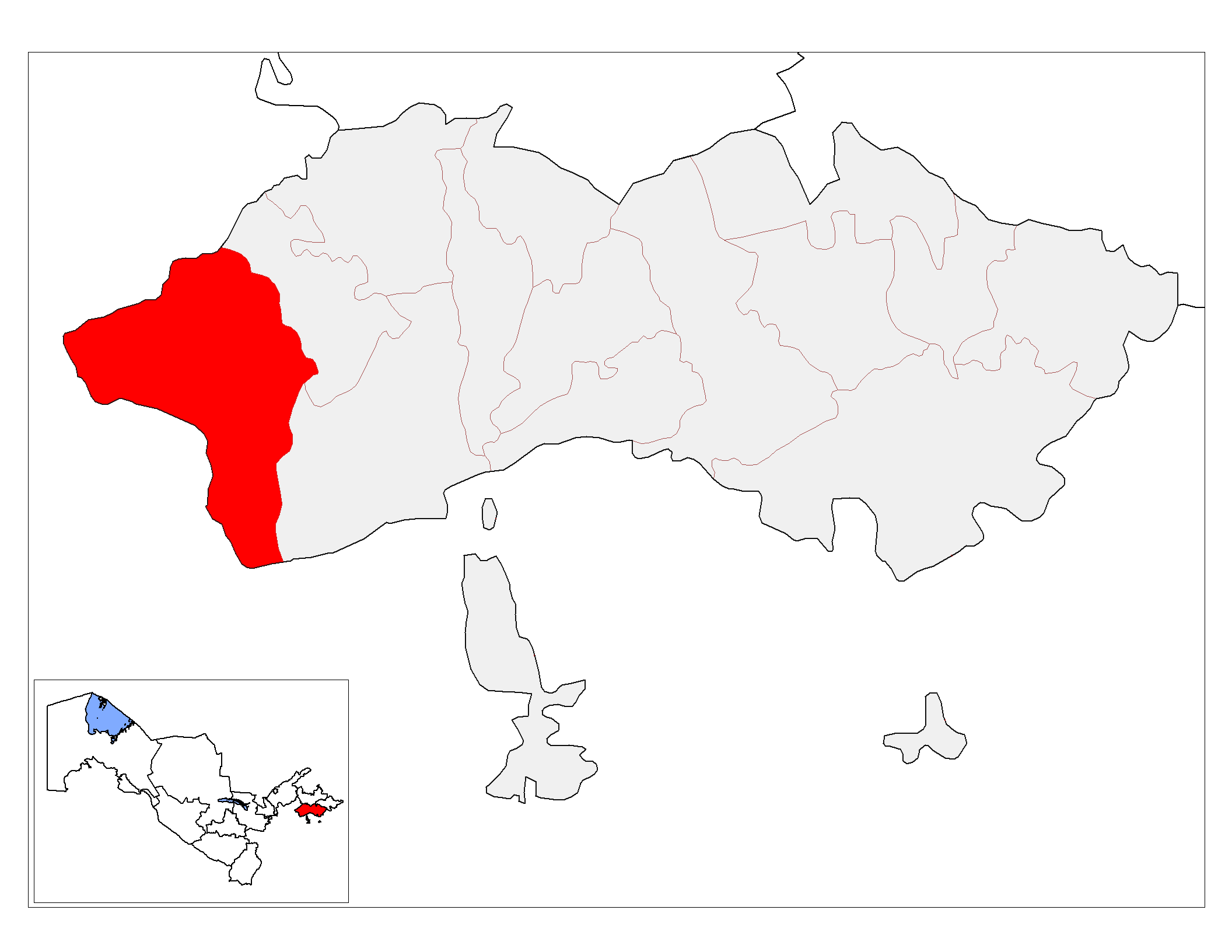
- Country: Uzbekistan
- Region: Fergana Region
- Capital: Beshariq
- Established: 1926

Area
  - Total: 770 km^{2} (300 sq mi)

Population (2022)
  - Total: 234,600
  - Density: 300/km^{2} (790/sq mi)
- Time zone: UTC+5 (UZT)

Beshariq is a district of Fergana Region in Uzbekistan. The capital lies at the city Beshariq. It has an area of 770 km^{2} (300 sq mi) and it had 234,600 inhabitants in 2022. The district consists of one city (Beshariq), 10 urban-type settlements (Nafosat, Zarqaynar, Kapayangi, Qumqishloq, Oqtovuq, Rapqon, Tovul, Uzun, Chimboy, Manguobod) and 9 rural communities.
