= Uchkoʻprik =

Urban-type settlement in Fergana Region, Uzbekistan

- urban-type settlement
- Location in Uzbekistan
- Coordinates: 40°32′32″N 71°3′39″E
- Country: Uzbekistan
- Region: Fergana Region
- District: Uchkoʻprik District

Population (2016)
  - Total: 4,300
- Time zone: UTC+5 (UZT)

Uchkoʻprik (also spelled Uchkuprik, Uzbek: Uchkoʻprik, Russian: Учкуприк) is an urban-type settlement in Fergana Region, Uzbekistan. It is the administrative center of Uchkoʻprik District. Its population was 4,277 people in 1989, and 4,300 in 2016.
