= Yozyovon District =

Coordinates: 40°39′11″N 71°38′35″E

Yozyovon
- District
- Yozyovon tumani
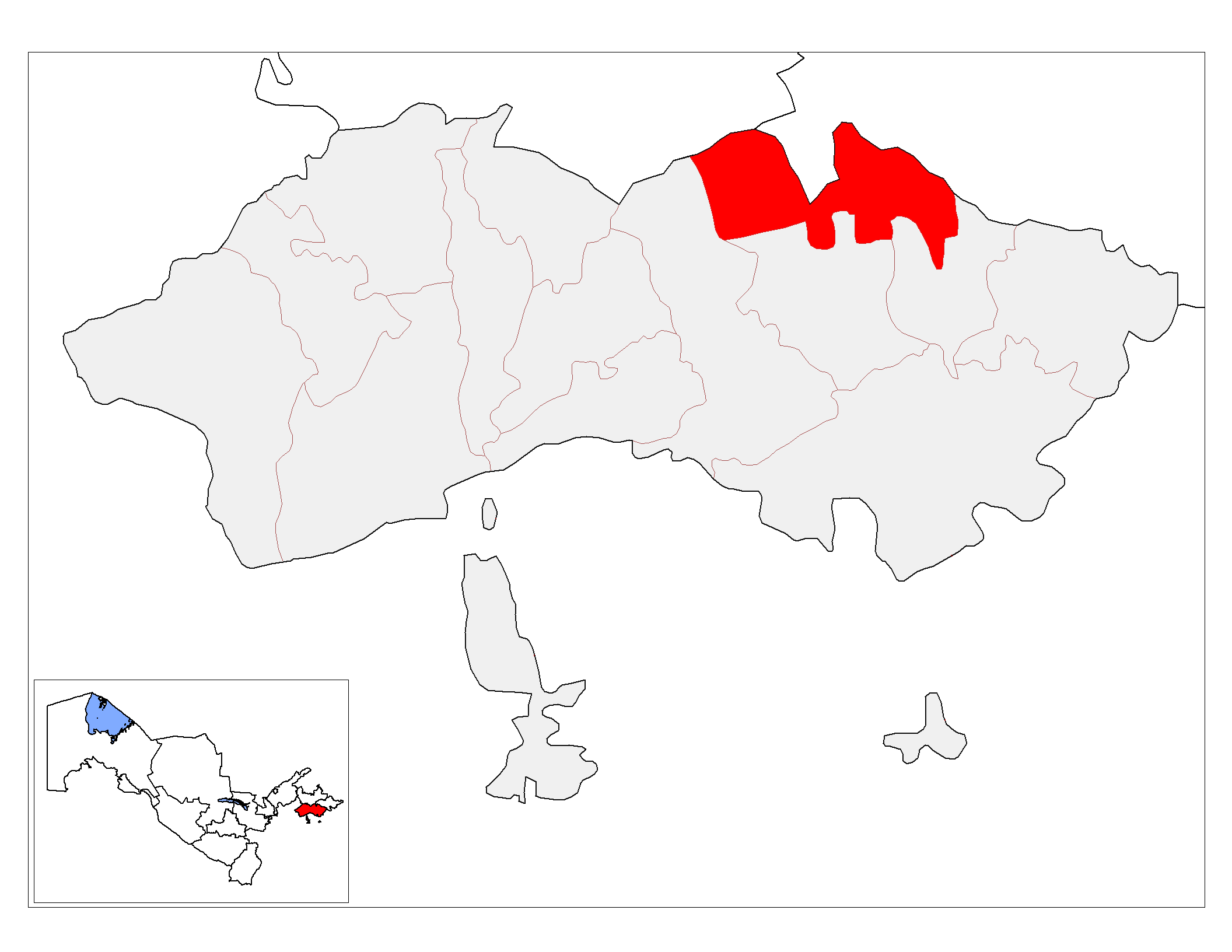
- Country: Uzbekistan
- Region: Fergana Region
- Capital: Yozyovon
- Established: 1926

Area
  - Total: 410 km^{2} (160 sq mi)

Population (2022)
  - Total: 114,700
  - Density: 280/km^{2} (720/sq mi)
- Time zone: UTC+5 (UZT)

Yozyovon is district of Fergana Region, Uzbekistan. Its seat is at the town Yozyovon. It has an area of 410 km^{2} (160 sq mi) and it had 114,700 inhabitants in 2022. The district consists of 9 urban-type settlements (Yozyovon, Yozyovon chek, Yoʻldoshobod, Qorasoqol, Qoratepa, Kelajak, Quyi Soyboʻyi, Toshxovuz, Xonobod) and 10 rural communities (Guliston, Qatortol, Karatepa, Xonobod, Istiqlol, Yozyovon, Yangiobod, Ishtirxon, Qorasoqol, Yangiboʻston).
