= Eskiarab =

Eskiarab Eskiarab (Uzbek)
- Town
- Location in Oltiariq District
- Coordinates: 40°22′07″N 71°25′23″E
- Country: Uzbekistan
- Region: Fergana Region
- District: Oltiariq District
- Town status: 2009

Government
  - Type: Town Council
  - Body: Ghayrat MFY

Area
  - Town: 22 km^{2} (8.5 sq mi)
  - Urban: 12 km^{2} (4.6 sq mi)
- Elevation: 465 m (1,526 ft)
- Highest elevation: 502 m (1,647 ft)
- Lowest elevation: 420 m (1,380 ft)

Population (2016)
  - Town: 12,600
  - Density: 65/km^{2} (170/sq mi)
- Time zone: UTC+5 (UZT)
- Postal code: 151215
- Area code: +(998) 73
- Geocode: 1538551
- Annual precipitation: 100-150 mm

Eskiarab (Uzbek: Eskiarab, Russian: Эскиараб) is a town in Oltiariq District of Fergana Region, Uzbekistan. It is situated in the south-west of Oltiariq District. The population of the town consists of mainly Uzbeks. It is a historical place containing several ancient places. One of the historic locations is the Kitkontepa ancient monument.

The town population was 12,600 in 2016. In 2009, Eskiarab was given town status. The local time is UTC +5 (UZT).

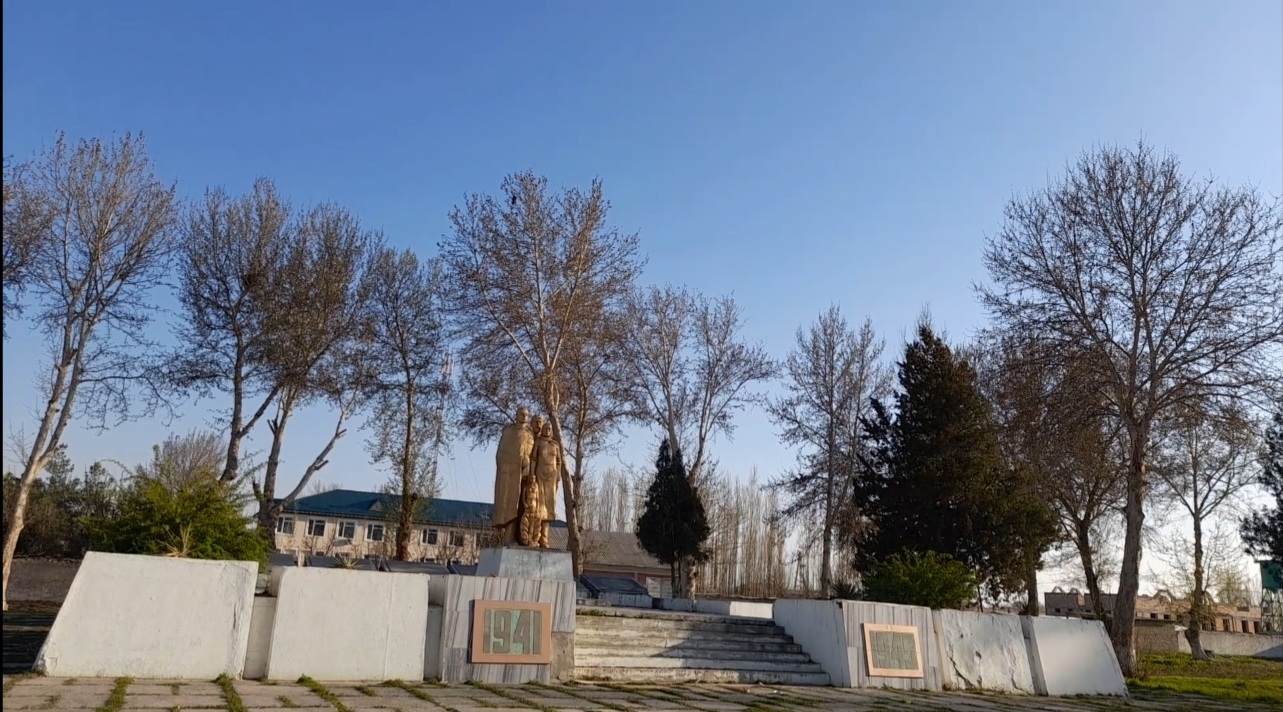

== Climate ==
The climate is subtropic. In summer, average temperature is 35 °C, in winter 5-7 °C. Annual precipitation ranges between 100 and 150 mm per year.

== See also ==
- List of cities in Uzbekistan
