= Furqat District =

Coordinates: 40.5015°N 70.7410°E

Furqat
- District
- Furqat tumani
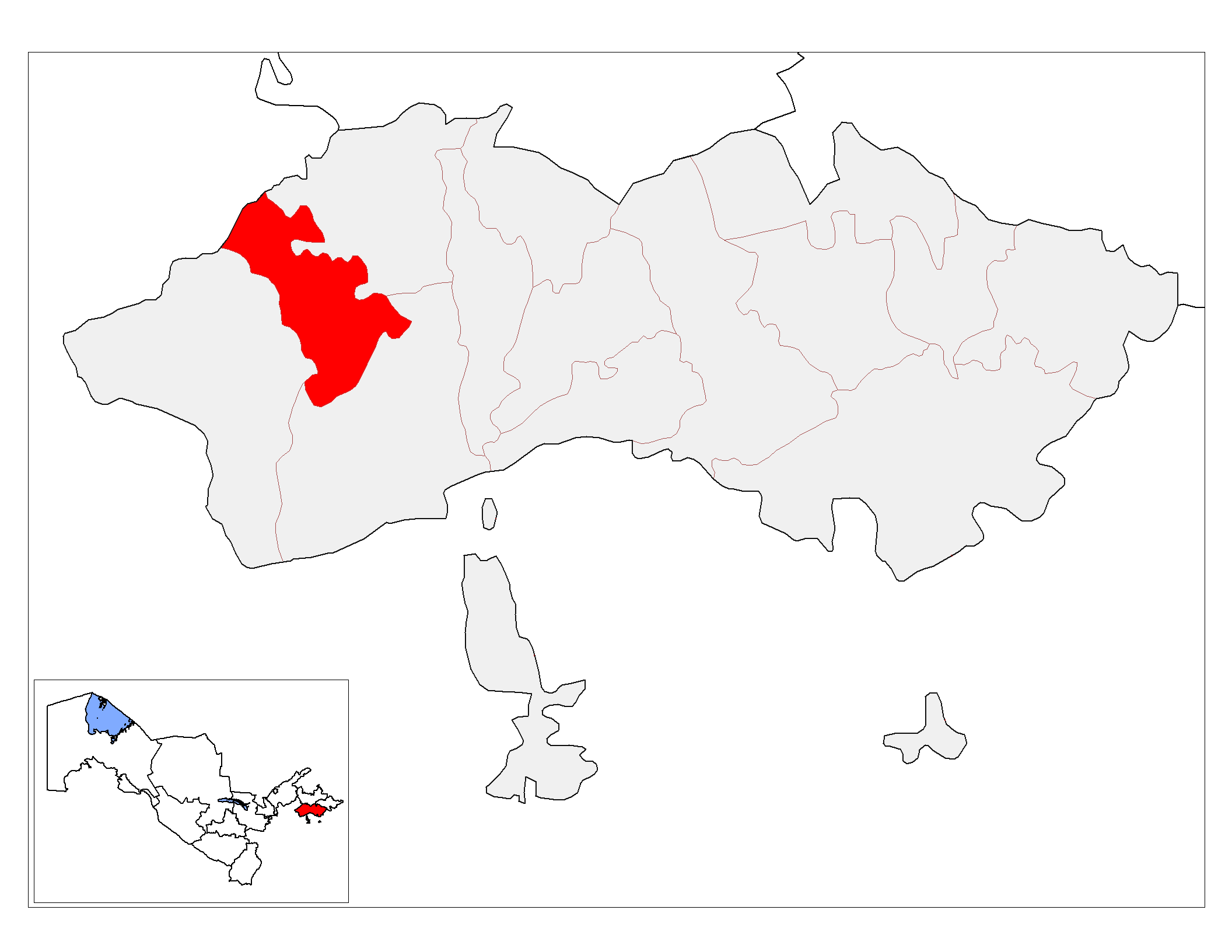
- Country: Uzbekistan
- Region: Fergana Region
- Capital: Navbahor
- Established: 1992

Area
  - Total: 310 km^{2} (120 sq mi)

Population (2022)
  - Total: 121,800
  - Density: 390/km^{2} (1,000/sq mi)
- Time zone: UTC+5 (UZT)

Furqat is a district of Fergana Region in Uzbekistan. The capital lies at the town Navbahor. It has an area of 310 km^{2} (120 sq mi) and it had 121,800 inhabitants in 2022. The district consists of 8 urban-type settlements (Navbahor, Kaldoʻshan, Qoʻqonboy, Tomosha, Chek chuvaldak, Shoyinbek, Eski, Eshon) and 6 rural communities.
