= Dangʻara =

- Urban-type settlement
- Location in Uzbekistan
- Coordinates: 40°34′59″N 70°54′36″E
- Country: Uzbekistan
- Region: Fergana Region
- District: Dangʻara District
- Urban-type settlement: 1979

Population (2016)
  - Total: 11,500
- Time zone: UTC+5 (UZT)

Dangʻara (Uzbek: Dangʻara, Данғара, Russian: Дангара) is an urban-type settlement in Fergana Region, Uzbekistan. It is the administrative center of Dangʻara District. Its population was 7,983 people in 1989, and 11,500 in 2016.
