= Dangʻara District =

Coordinates: 40.5805°N 70.9170°E

- District
- Dangʻara tumani
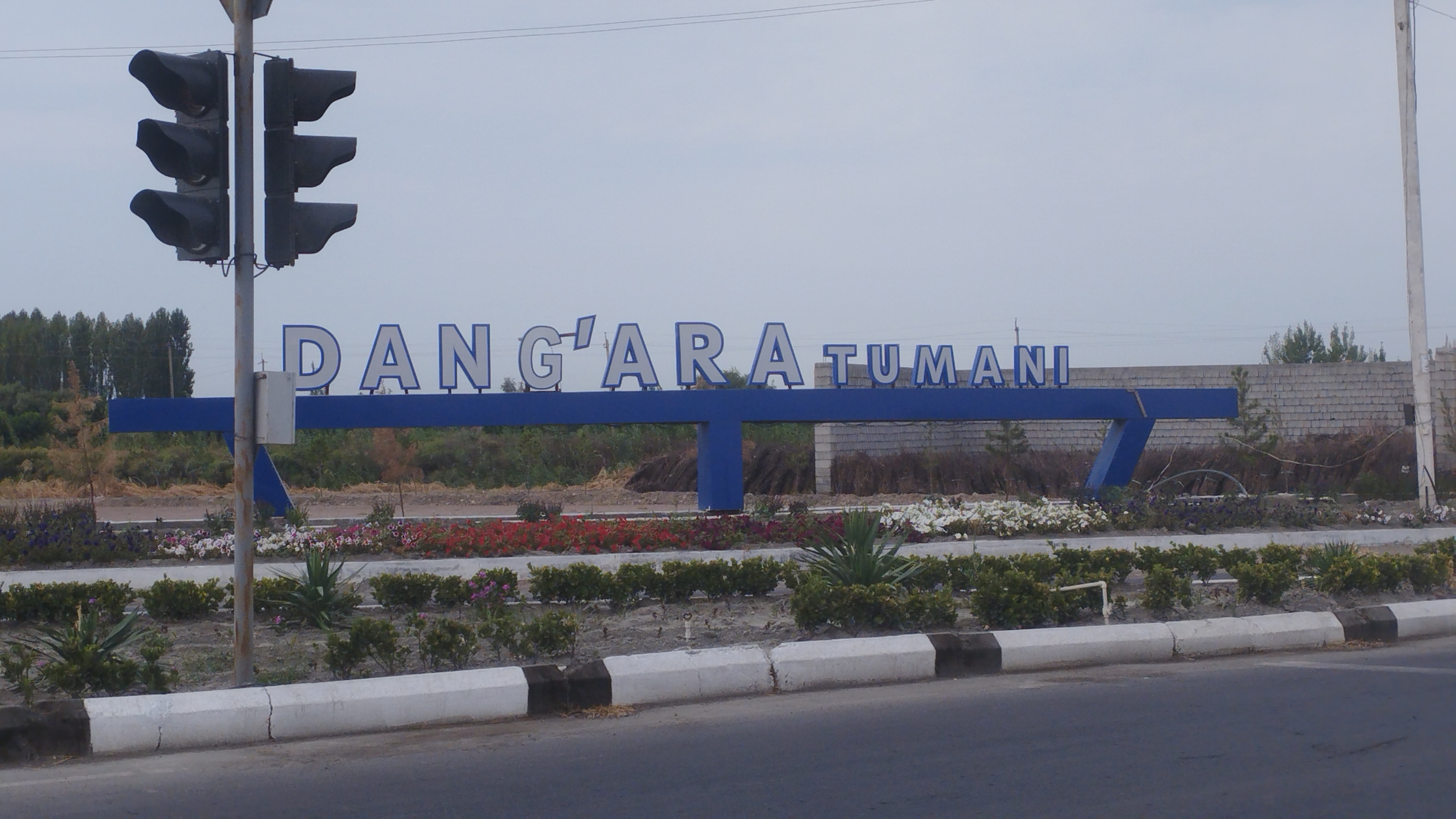

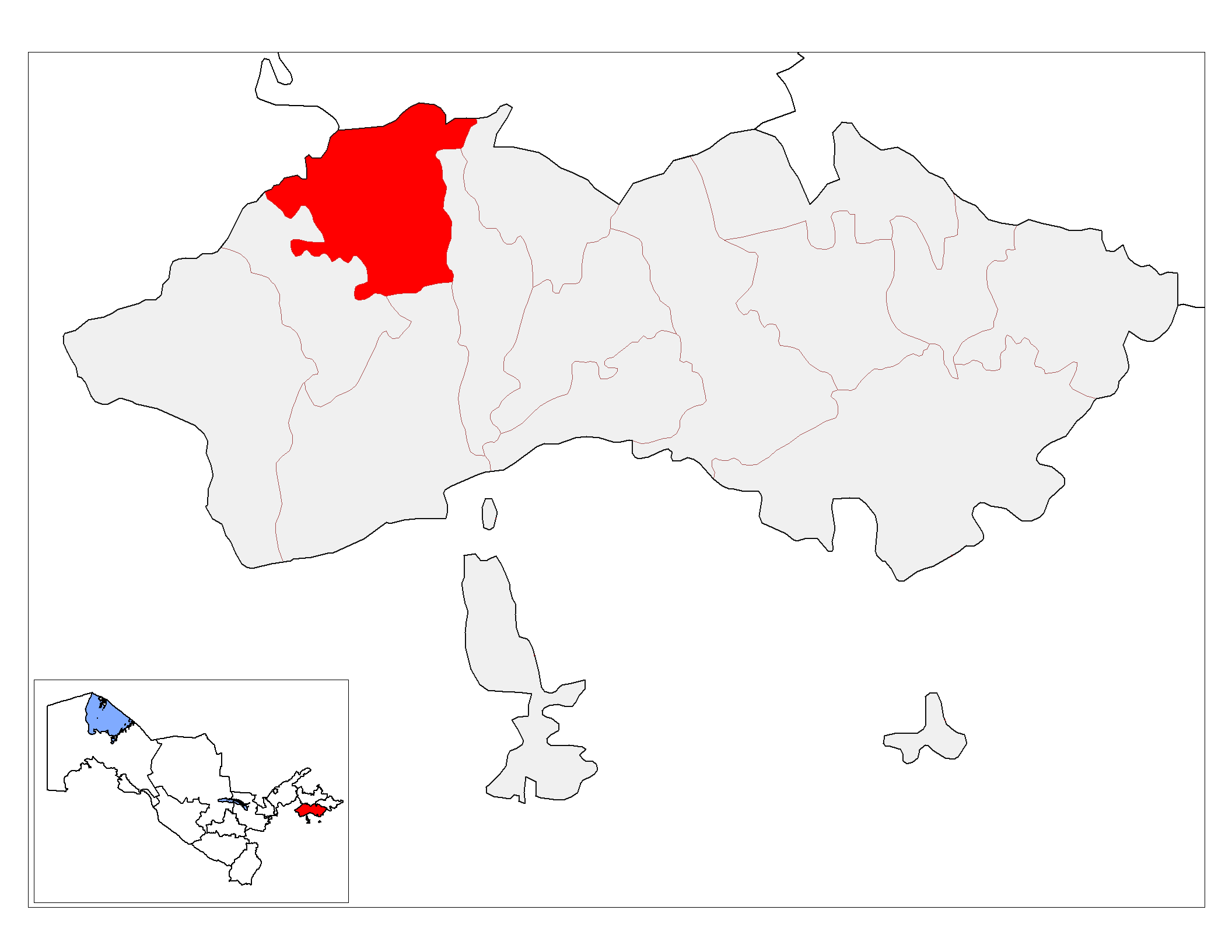
- Country: Uzbekistan
- Region: Fergana Region
- Capital: Dangʻara
- Established: 1939

Area
  - Total: 430 km^{2} (170 sq mi)

Population (2022)
  - Total: 180,800
  - Density: 420/km^{2} (1,100/sq mi)
- Time zone: UTC+5 (UZT)

Dangʻara District (Uzbek: Dangʻara tumani) is a district of Fergana Region in Uzbekistan. The capital lies at the town Dangʻara. It has an area of 430 km^{2} (170 sq mi) and it had 180,800 inhabitants in 2022. The district consists of 9 urban-type settlements (Dangʻara, Doimobod, Katta Ganjiravon, Katta Turk, Qum Qiyali, Toptiqsaroy, Tumor, Yuqori Urganji, Yangi zamon) and 8 rural communities.
