= Uchkoʻprik District =

Coordinates: 40.5111°N 71.0258°E

- District
- Uchkoʻprik tumani
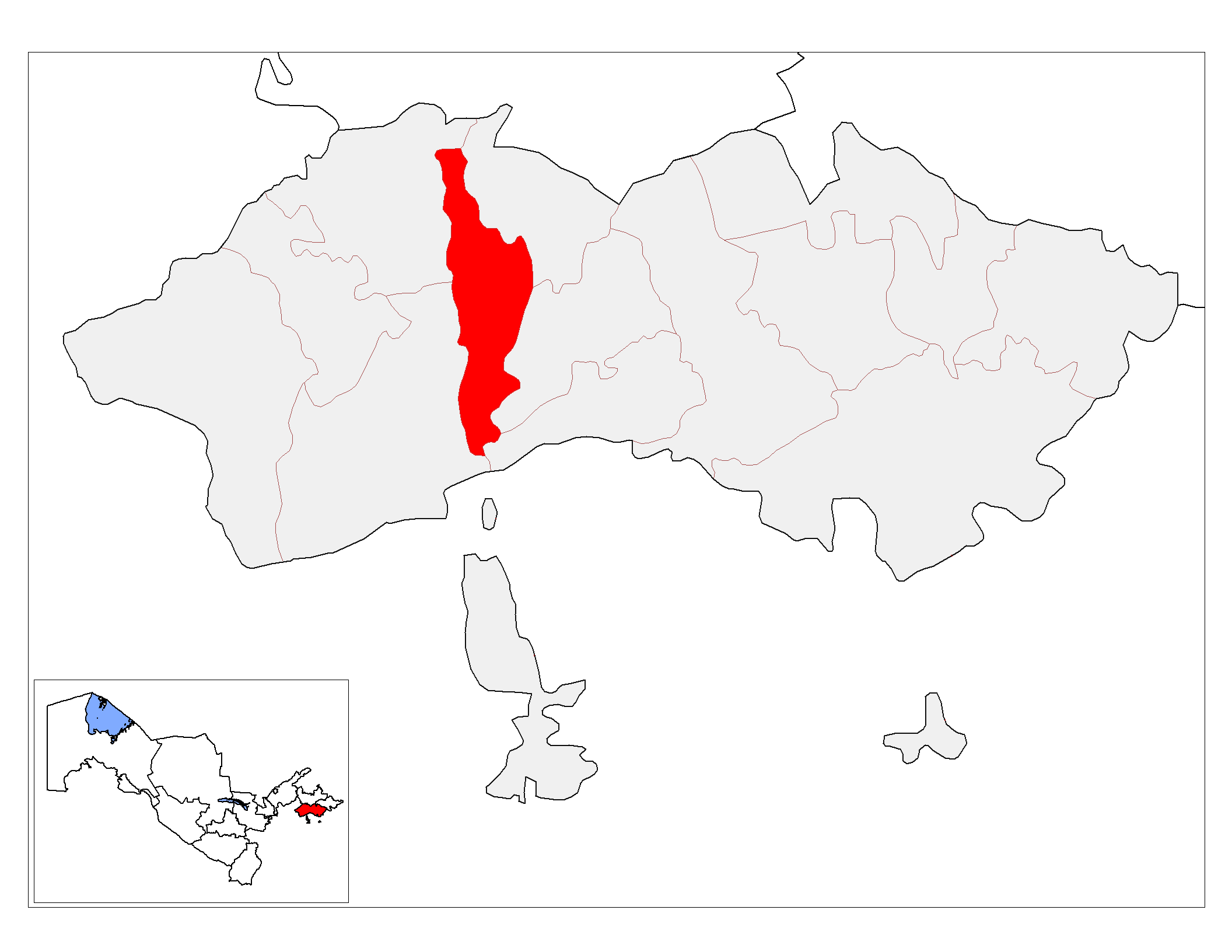
- Country: Uzbekistan
- Region: Fergana Region
- Capital: Uchkoʻprik
- Established: 1926

Area
  - Total: 280 km^{2} (110 sq mi)

Population (2022)
  - Total: 237,300
  - Density: 850/km^{2} (2,200/sq mi)
- Time zone: UTC+5 (UZT)

Uchkoʻprik District (Uzbek: Uchkoʻprik tumani) is a district of Fergana Region in Uzbekistan. The capital lies at the town Uchkoʻprik. It has an area of 280 km^{2} (110 sq mi) and it had 237,300 inhabitants in 2022. The district consists of 11 urban-type settlements (Uchkoʻprik, Begobod, Gʻijdan, (Katta Qashqar), Qumariqobod, Bogʻiboʻston, Mirzaxoʻja, Palaxon, Sobirjon, Turgʻoq, Yangiqishloq) and 9 rural communities.
