= Oltiariq District =

Coordinates: 40.3919°N 71.5022°E

Oltiariq District Atyaryk
- District
- Oltiariq tumani
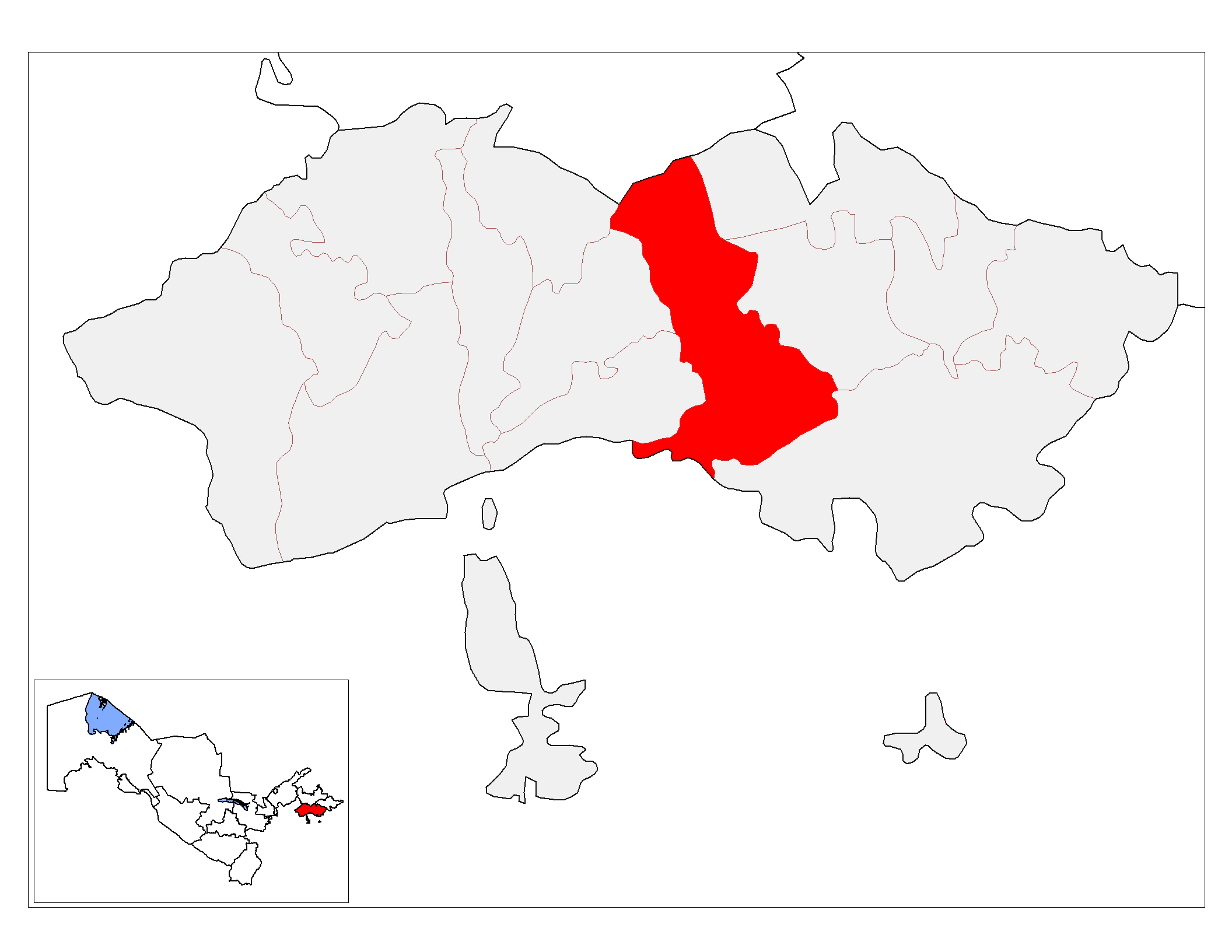

- Location within Uzbekistan
- Country: Uzbekistan
- Region: Fergana Region
- Capital: Oltiariq
- Established: 1926

Government
  - Type: Tuman Hokimi

Area
  - Total: 630 km^{2} (240 sq mi)
- Elevation: 500 m (1,600 ft)

Population (2022)
  - Total: 300,000
  - Density: 480/km^{2} (1,200/sq mi)
- Time zone: UTC+5 (UZT)
- Postal code: 151200
- Website: www.oltiariq.uz

Oltiariq District (Uzbek: Oltiariq tumani, Олтиариқ тумани) is a tuman (district) of Fergana Region in Uzbekistan. The capital lies at the town Oltiariq. It has an area of 630 km^{2} (240 sq mi) and it had 219,100 inhabitants in 2022. The district consists of one city (Tinchlik), 14 urban-type settlements (Oltiariq, Chinor, Azimobod, Boʻrbaliq, Djurek, Zilxa, Katput, Oqboʻyra, Povulgʻon, Poloson, Chordara, Eskiarab, Yangiarab, Yangiqoʻrgʻon) and 15 rural communities.
