= Oltiariq =

Settlement in Fergana Region, Uzbekistan

Oltiariq Altyaryk
- Urban-type settlement
- Location in Uzbekistan
- Coordinates: 40°23′30″N 71°28′36″E
- Country: Uzbekistan
- Region: Fergana Region
- District: Oltiariq District
- Urban-type settlement status: 1980
- Elevation: 520 m (1,710 ft)

Population (2011)
  - Total: 25,543
- Time zone: UTC+5 (UZT)

Oltiariq (Uzbek: Oltiariq) is an urban-type settlement in Fergana Region, Uzbekistan. It is the administrative center of Oltiariq District.

== Population ==
The town population in 1989 was 8,781 people.
