= Tinchlik, Fergana Region =

Tinchlik
- City
- Location in Uzbekistan
- Coordinates: 40°25′35″N 71°29′44″E
- Country: Uzbekistan
- Region: Fergana Region
- District: Oltiariq District
- Town status: 1974

Population (2016)
  - Total: 14,700
- Time zone: UTC+5 (UZT)

Tinchlik (Uzbek: Tinchlik / Тинчлик, before 2012: Hamza) is a city in Fergana Region, Uzbekistan. It is part of Oltiariq District. Its population is 14,700 (2016).
