= Fergana Region =

Region of Uzbekistan

Fergana Region Fargʻona viloyati
- Region
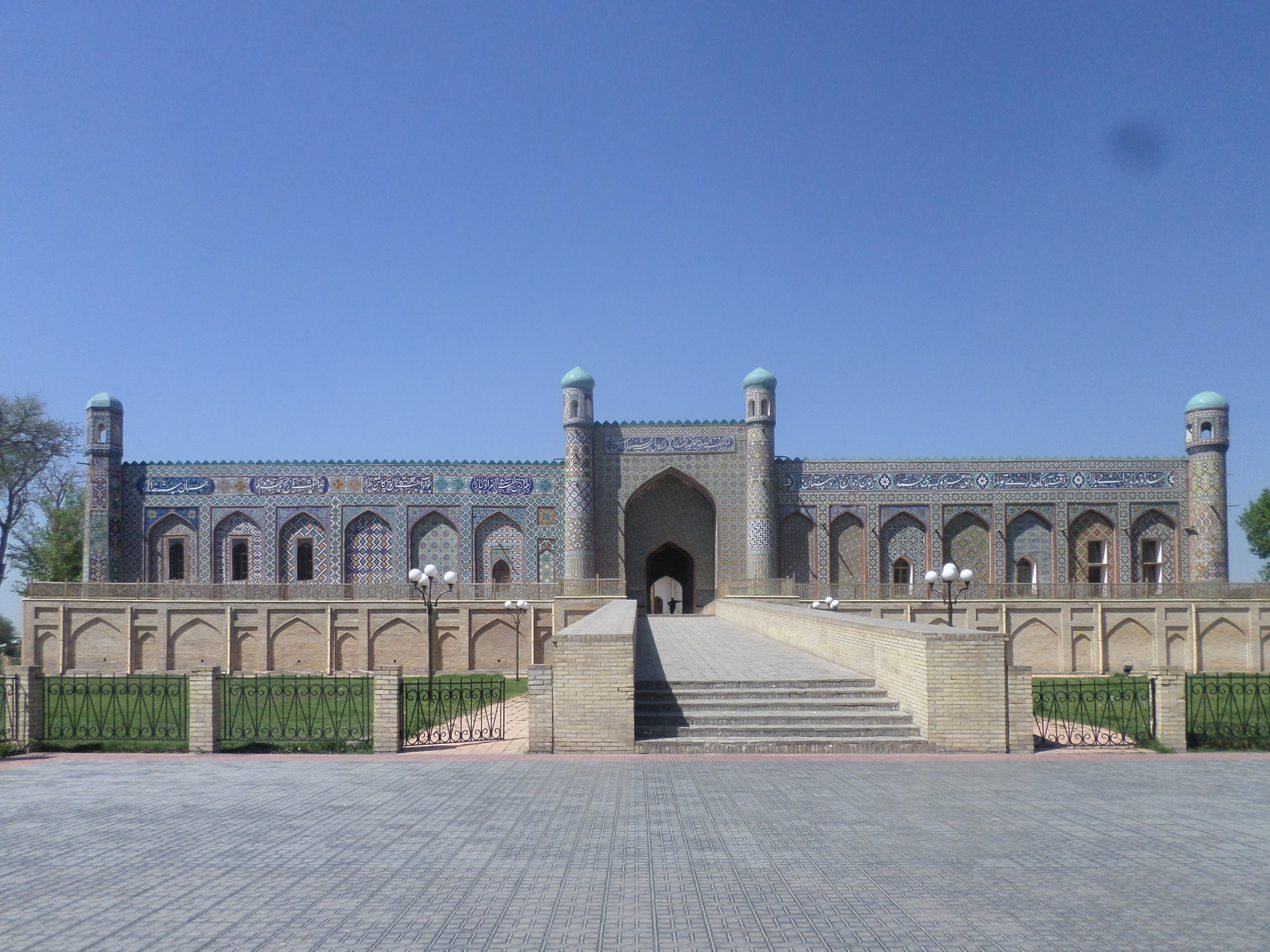
- Palace of Khudáyár Khán

- Fergana in Uzbekistan
- Coordinates: 40°25′N 71°21′E
- Country: Uzbekistan
- Capital: Fergana

Government
  - Hokim: Khayrullo Bozarov

Area
  - Total: 6,760 km^{2} (2,610 sq mi)

Population (2023)
  - Total: 4,014,895
  - Density: 594/km^{2} (1,540/sq mi)
- Time zone: UTC+5 (East)
- ISO 3166 code: UZ-FA
- Districts: 15
- Cities: 9
- Towns: 197
- Villages: 1,021
- Website: www.ferghana.uz

Fergana Region (Note: Uzbek: Fargʻona viloyati, IPA: [ɸaɾʁɒˈna ʋɪlɒjaˈtʰɪ]) (Note: Formerly known as Fergana Oblast (from Russian: Ферганская область).) is one of the regions of Uzbekistan, located in the southern part of the Fergana Valley in the far east of the country. It borders the Namangan and Andijan Regions of Uzbekistan, as well as Kyrgyzstan (Batken and Osh Regions) and Tajikistan (Sughd Region). Its capital is the city of Fergana. It covers an area of 6,760 km^{2}. The population is approximately 4,014,895 as of 2023, with 45% of the population living in rural areas.

== Districts ==
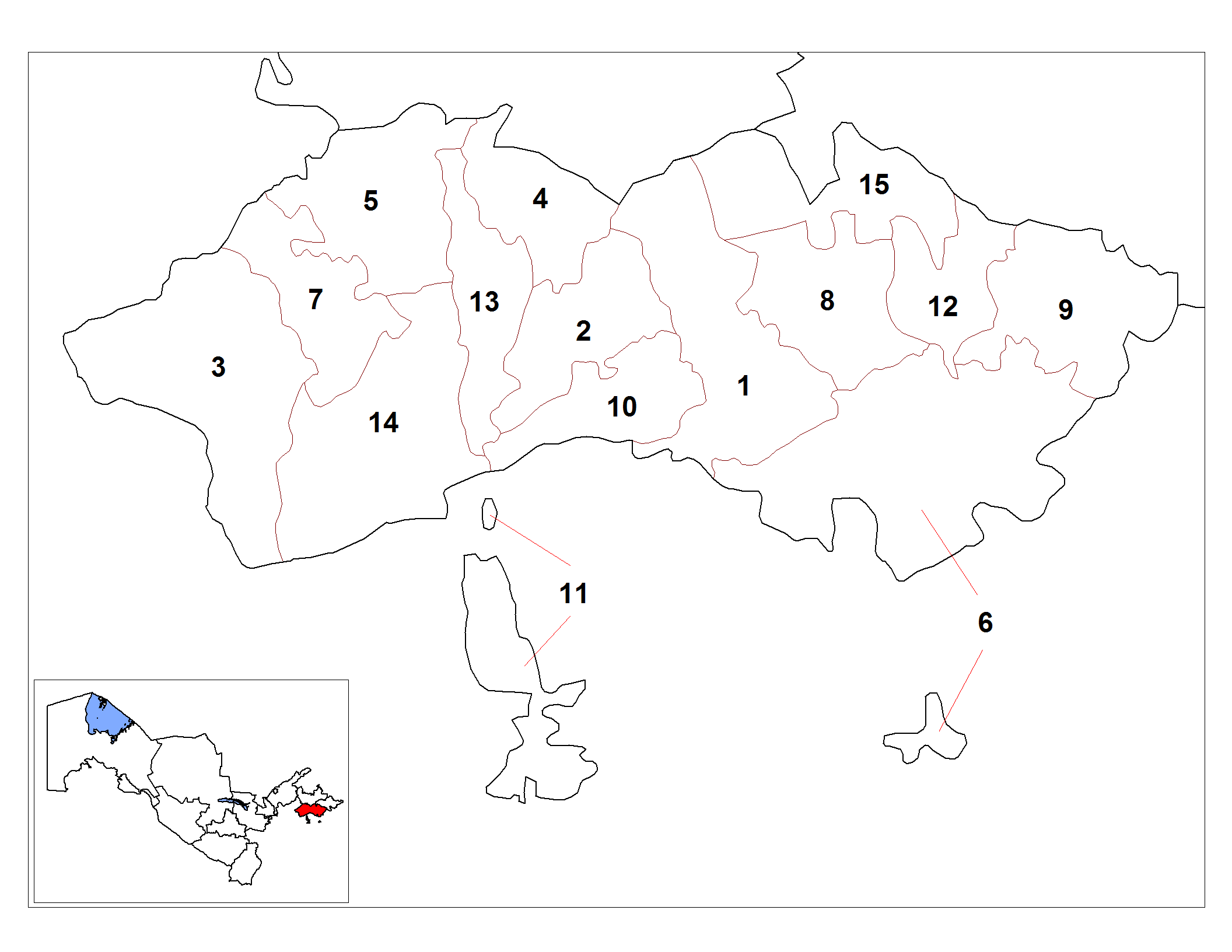
Districts of Fergana

The Fergana Region consists of 15 districts (listed below) and four district-level cities: Fergana, Kokand, Quvasoy and Margilan.

	District name	District capital
1	Oltiariq District	Oltiariq
2	Bagʻdod District	Bagʻdod
3	Beshariq District	Beshariq
4	Buvayda District	Yangiqoʻrgʻon
5	Dangʻara District	Dangʻara
6	Fergana District	Vodil
7	Furqat District	Navbahor
8	Qoʻshtepa District	Langar
9	Quva District	Quva
10	Rishton District	Rishton
11	Soʻx District	Ravon
12	Toshloq District	Toshloq
13	Uchkoʻprik District	Uchkoʻprik
14	Uzbekistan District	Yaypan
15	Yozyovon District	Yozyovon

There are 9 cities (Fergana*, Margilan*,Quvasoy*, Kokand*, Tinchlik, Beshariq, Quva, Rishton, Yaypan) and 197 urban-type settlements in the Fergana Region.

== Geography ==
The northern part of the Fergana region is occupied by the Karakalpak and Yazyavan steppes, and is bounded on the south by a tributary of the Olay ridge. Fergana region is a high seismic zone. The climate is continental, and the winters are mild, sometimes very cold. Strong "Kokand wind" blowing in the west of the valley has a negative impact on the climate. In the south-east it blows summer wind. Annual precipitation ranges from 100 mm in the west (around Kokand) to 170 mm in the east, and up to 270 mm on the mountain slopes, mainly in the spring. Vegetation period is 210–240 days. The Syrdarya River flows along the north-western border of the region. Isfara, Sokh, Shohimardon, Isfayramsay start from the Alay ridge. The rivers are saturated with ice and snow. There are mainly gray soils and meadow-swamp soils, mostly hungry and typical gray soils on the hills, alluvial-meadow soils on the terraces of the Syrdarya, sandy and loamy meadows in the northern part of the region.

Various salt marshes grow in the salt marshes of Central Fergana. There are poplar, mulberry, slate, broad-leaved forests, and pine forests in the oases in the river valleys. In the Syrdarya tugai forests, wolves, foxes, wolverines, rabbits, badgers, and jays are among the wild animals. There are many birds and reptiles. In the water basins, there are fish such as marinka, usach, carp, grass carp, perch.

Fergana Region has a typically continental climate with extreme differences between winter and summer temperatures.

Agriculture is the main economic activity of Fergana Region, primarily irrigated cotton, sericulture, horticulture, and wine. Animal husbandry concentrates on meat and milk production.

Natural resources include deposits of petroleum, ceramic clays, and construction materials.

Industry is primarily based on oil refining, fertilizer and chemical production, textile and silk weaving, light industry, clothing and ceramics. The area is also a center for the production of traditional Uzbek handicrafts, especially pottery.

Passport indicators of Fergana region

(January–June 2020)

Date of formation - 15.01.1938 Area - 7.0 thousand km^{2} (to 700 461) Border length (2286.4 km) of which, it borders Kyrgyzstan (433.0 km), Tajikistan (134.6 km), Andijan (101.6 km), Namangan (79.4 km). Population -3782.2 thousand people Number of public meetings -1041 Number of apartments -756 428 Ethnic composition: Uzbeks (89.6%), Kyrgyz (2%), Tajiks (5.9%), representatives of other nationalities (2.6%). Regional economy specializes in industrial production (Light industry, Food industry, Building materials industry, Fuel and energy industry, Chemical and petrochemical industry), agricultural production (fruits and vegetables, grapes, melons, livestock, poultry), pottery, carpentry tourism, trade, meat and dairy processing and other services.

II. Socio-economic indicators::

Schools – 946 та, Preschool education institution – 1 870 та, Health facilities – 839 та	New vacancies: 11430 та Unemployment rate: 9,7% Number of the population who work abroad: 275 236 Unemployed: 158 079
Crime status – 5 079 (in 2018 – 5 362)	Revenues to the local budget – 1127,4 billion soum (110,6%).
Gas supply level - 98,5 %	The level of drinking water supply - 85%
Large industrial enterprises: 38 ("ФНҚЗ" (limited liability company), "Азот" (joint stock company)	Joint ventures: 446 Small industrial enterprises: 7930 During the reporting period, the number of business entities increased by 2,721 (32206)
Industry (growth rate of 9458.2 billion soums -102.1%)	Service (growth rate of 6015.8 billion soums -101.7%)
Assimilated investment funds - 4876.8 billion soums	Including foreign direct investment - 1104.7 billion soums
Export volume – 327,3 billion dollars In practice – 249,1 billion dollars (76,1%)	Including the export plan of industrial products – 175,3 billion dollars In practice – 138,4 billion dollars (79%) Fruit and vegetable export plan - 141,2 billion dollars. In practice – 104,9 billion dollars (74,3%)
Loans allocated under the program "Our Youth our Future" – 20116 billion soum	Loans allocated under the program "Every family-entrepreneur" – 176895 billion soum

III. Agricultural indicators:

Cotton growing: - 250000 tons	In 2019 – 108,8 % expectation
Grain growing: - 526630 tons	In 2019 – 115,6 % done
The number of large horned cattle as of January 1, 2020: - 1006376	As of January 1, 2019 increased to 8936
The number of operating farms: 10918	Average land area: to 37,5

Fergana region is a region of the Republic of Uzbekistan. It was founded on January 15, 1938. It is located in the east of the republic, in the south of the Fergana valley. Border length (2286.4 km) Of which, in the east with the state of Kyrgyzstan (433.0 km), in the west with the state of Tajikistan (134.6 km), in the north with Andijan (101.6 km), Namangan (79.4 km), regions bordering on. The area is 7.0 thousand sq. km (700 461 ha). The population is 3782.2 thousand people (2020), mainly Uzbeks, but also Tajiks, Russians, Kyrgyz, Tatars and other nationalities. Number of citizens' meetings -1041, number of apartments -756 428. The center of the city is Fergana.

== History ==
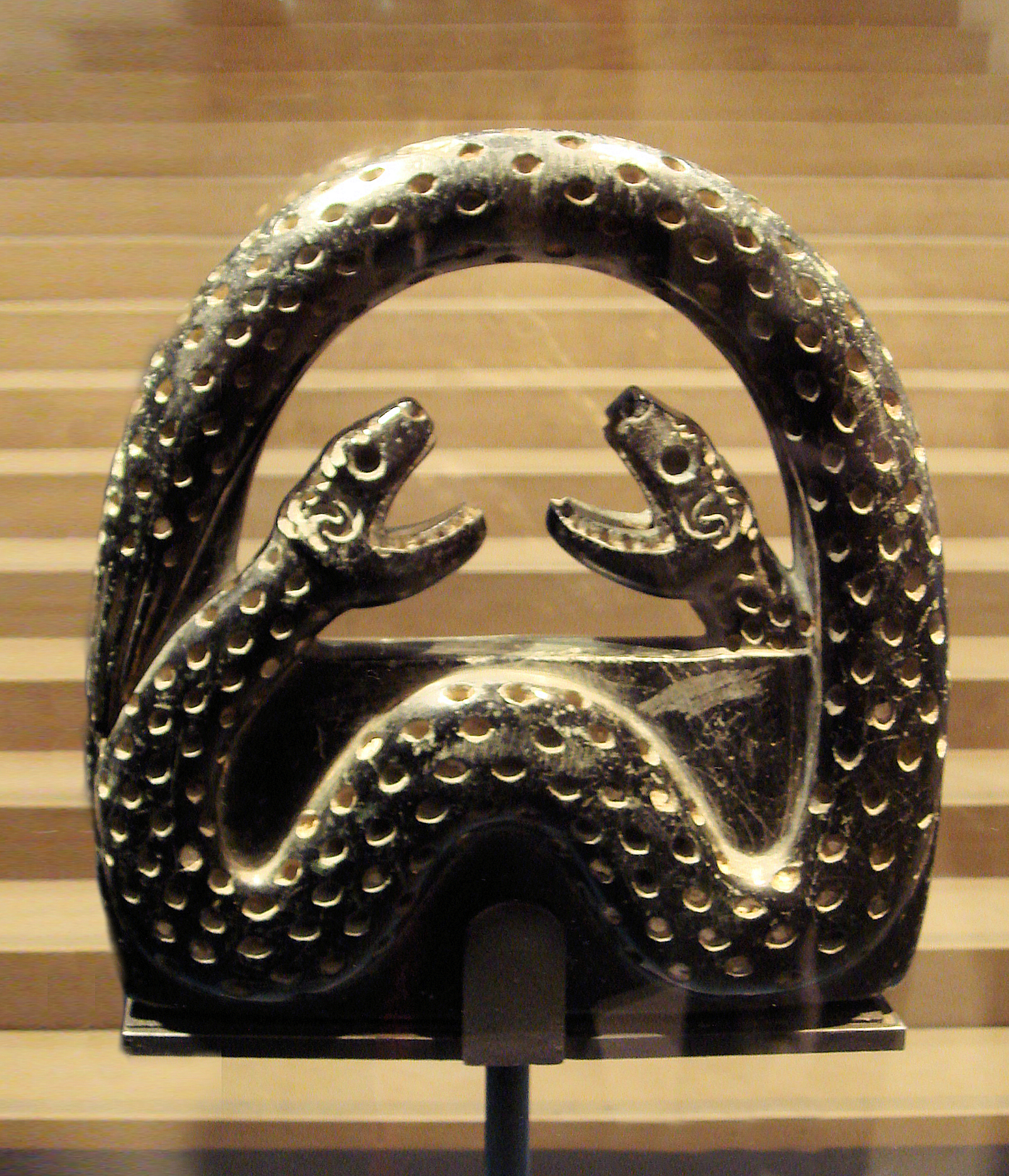
Two snakes, Sokh, Ferghana valley, 3rd millennium BCE.

Fergana region is one of the centers of ancient culture of Uzbekistan. Pictures of Stone Age settlements and rocks found in the area, stone tools indicate that people have lived in the valley since ancient times. The excavation of the Greater Fergana Canal has played an important role in the study of archeological monuments of the region. During the canal's excavation, monuments of the Bronze Age, slavery and landownership were found and examined. Finds from the 5th century BC and early Middle Ages in the city of Kuva are well researched. Historical sources from the 10th to the 11th centuries state that this city was the largest city in the valley after Akhsikat in terms of prosperity and size. Archaeological materials prove that the city of Margilan was a large village in the 10th century and took on the appearance of a village in the 11th-12th centuries.

The monuments found in the settlements of the Chust culture, which were engaged in sedentary farming and animal husbandry, are important in the study of the Fergana Valley. Archaeological excavations show that Fergana region has long been inhabited by people, engaged in hunting, farming, animal husbandry, and in the later stages of human society, culture began to develop.

Fergana, which fascinates everyone with its charming nature and unique beauty, has a long history. The reasons for naming this mysterious place "Fergana" are variously described in historical sources.

Scholars have noted that the word "Fergana" was written in the early Middle Ages in the Sogdian script in the forms "Pargana", "Pragana" and in Indo-Sanskrit "small region"; in Persian it means "valley between mountains", "closed valley". It was called "Dovon" in the 2nd century BC, and in the early Middle Ages it was called "Bohan", "Bohanna".

The history of Fergana dates back to the III-II millennium BC. From ancient times the inhabitants of this land have been in close cultural contact with other peoples of the Far East, South and Central Asia. Examples of this are the relics of the "Andronov culture" (III-II millennium BC), which are very common in the region, or the amulet "Two-headed snake" found in Sokh district. The war, labor weapons, household items, and other items of these periods differ from those found in other parts of Central Asia.

With the opening of the Great Silk Road, the influence of Chinese culture on the lives of the peoples of Fergana began to be felt. The emergence of bronze windows, coins, silk fabrics, iron weapons, etc. is directly related to the Great Silk Road. It is precisely because of the Great Silk Road that in the beginning of our era, information about the breeding of horses, camels and small animals, the abundance of precious metals, as well as the cultivation of cotton, grapes and cereals spread around the world. The large number of city-fortress settlements of this period testifies to the development of architecture and urban planning technology.

In the early Middle Ages, Fergana became one of the bridges between Central Asia and China, and the socio-political environment here also changed frequently under the influence of these two regions.

During the reign of the Timurids, national handicrafts, like other industries, developed further. For example, Margilan specialized in the production of silk and silk products, Rishtan in ceramics.

In the beginning of the 18th century, representatives of the Ming dynasty united the villages around the city of Kokand and established a new khanate. Shortly afterward, the Kokand Khanate became one of Central Asia's largest, most powerful, and fastest-growing states.

Fergana, which underwent various turbulent years during the dictatorial regime, finally discovered true beauty during the period of independence and entered a new stage of development. In the words of the first President, he received the status of "Fergana - the pearl of Central Asia." ilt.

The decree of the First President of the Republic of Uzbekistan dated July 1, 2010 "On the formation of the General Plan of the city of Fergana until 2020" led to the construction of buildings, trade and service facilities, 5 parks and alleys, 8 fountains, bridges and public roads, built in a combination of national and modern art.

== Economy ==
=== Industry ===
At present, 38 large industrial enterprises, 7930 small industrial enterprises, 446 joint ventures include the Fergana Oil Refinery, the Azot Production Association, the Quvasoy Quartz Joint-Stock Company, the Eurasian TAPO-Disk, Avtooyna, and DEU Textile joint ventures.

They export oil, cotton, food, canned goods, construction materials, car discs, spare parts, agricultural products, and other products to foreign countries.

=== Sport ===
In 1991, there were only 17 stadiums in Fergana region, now there are 46, 759 football fields, and 33 modern tennis courts.

In May 2016, the final stage of the Universiade-2016 was held in Fergana.

== Education ==
Today, 946 secondary schools, academic lyceums, 1,870 preschool education institutions, and 20 libraries operate in the region. There are 5 higher education institutions in the region: Fergana State University, Fergana Polytechnic Institute, Kokand State Pedagogical Institute, Tashkent University of Information Technologies Fergana branch, Tashkent Medical Academy Fergana branch, Kokand University and Kokand state technical university.

== Healthcare ==
There are 839 healthcare facilities in the region.

== Literature ==
From the 18th century onwards, science, literature, and art flourished in the Fergana Valley, particularly in Kokand. The formation of the Kokand khanate and its functioning as a centralized state allowed the formation of a unique literary environment in the territory of the khanate. During this period, such literary figures as Huvaydo, Shokhi, Akmal, Nizami, Hoqandi created.

In the 19th century, the literature known as the "Kokand Literary Environment" flourished in the region. The organizer of this environment, Kokand khan Muhammad Said Amir Umarkhan (1787-1822) attracted about 100 artists to the palace and created material and spiritual conditions for their creativity. The khan himself wrote the "Devoni" of poems under the pseudonym Amir.

It is known from history that Fergana was the birthplace of great scholars, like Ahmad Fergani, Burhaniddin Marginoni, poets such as Muqimi, Furkat, Nodira, Uvaysi, and a number of scientists. During the years of independence, the rich spiritual heritage left by these authors has been completely rediscovered, boosting spiritual and cultural life.

Fergana is a centre of Uzbek literature. Writers from the region include Ohunjon Hakimov, Anvar Obidjon, Ikbol Mirzo, Enakhon Siddikova, M. Ergasheva, Yuldosh Solijonov, Khudoiberdi Tukhtaboev, I. Mahmud, Bahodir Isa and Siddik Momin.

== Academicians from Fergana ==
- Honored Scientist of Uzbekistan, Academician of the Academy of Sciences of Uzbekistan, Doctor of Physical and Mathematical Sciences, Professor, First President of the Academy of Sciences of Uzbekistan, Hero of Labor, teacher, public figure – Qori-Niyazi Tashmuhammad Niyazovich
- Literary scholar, poet, corresponding member of the Academy of Sciences of Uzbekistan – Baki (pseudonym; real name Mirzaabdulla Nasriddinov)
- Historian, orientalist, academician of the Academy of Sciences of Uzbekistan – Yuldashev Muhammadjon Yuldashevich
- Physicist, statesman and public figure, Academician of the Academy of Sciences of Uzbekistan, Honored Worker of Science and Technology of Uzbekistan, Doctor of Physical and Mathematical Sciences, Professor – Ubay Orifov
- Hydrobiologist, Academician of the Academy of Sciences of Uzbekistan, Honored Scientist of Uzbekistan, Doctor of Biological Sciences, Professor – Muhammadiev Avliyokhon
- One of the organizers of zoology in Uzbekistan, Academician of the Academy of Sciences of Uzbekistan, Honored Scientist and Technician of Uzbekistan, Doctor of Biological Sciences, Professor – Zohidov Tesha Zohidovich
- Economist, Corresponding Member of the Academy of Sciences of Uzbekistan, Doctor of Economics, Professor, Honored Scientist of Uzbekistan – Aminov Olim Muminovich
- Botanist, Academician of the Academy of Sciences of Uzbekistan, Honored Scientist of Uzbekistan, Doctor of Biological Sciences, Professor – Saidov Jura
- Genetic scientist, corresponding member of the Academy of Sciences of Uzbekistan, Honored Scientist of Uzbekistan – Sodikov Saodat Sodikovich
- Infectious disease scientist, academician of the Academy of Sciences of Uzbekistan, Honored Worker of Science and Technology of Uzbekistan and Karakalpakstan, Honored Doctor of Uzbekistan, participant of the World War II – Musaboev Ishak Kurbanovich
- Linguist, corresponding member of the Academy of Sciences of Uzbekistan, candidate of philological sciences – Kamilova Hosiyat Kamilovna
- Agronomist, statesman, Academician of the Academy of Sciences of Uzbekistan, Honored Scientist of Uzbekistan, Doctor of Agricultural Sciences, Professor – Muhammadjanov Mirzaali Valiyevich
- Theater scholar, Academician of the Academy of Sciences of Uzbekistan, Honored Scientist of Uzbekistan, Doctor of Arts, Professor – Rakhmonov Mamajon
- Mathematician and public figure, Academician of the Academy of Sciences of Uzbekistan, Honored Scientist of Uzbekistan, Doctor of Physics and Mathematics, Professor – Sirojiddinov Sadi Hasanovich
- Linguist, Academician of the Academy of Sciences of Uzbekistan, Honored Scientist of Uzbekistan – Abdurahmanov Ganijon
- Historian, Academician of the Academy of Sciences of Uzbekistan, Honored Scientist of Uzbekistan, Doctor of Historical Sciences, Professor – Aminova Rahima Hodievna
- Literary critic, academician of the Academy of Sciences of Uzbekistan, Honored Scientist of Uzbekistan, Doctor of Philology – Kayumov Azizkhon Pulatovich
- Literary scholar, Honored Scientist of Uzbekistan, Doctor of Philology, Professor – Hayitmetov Abdukodir Khojimetovich
- Master of painting, academician of the Academy of Sciences of Uzbekistan, People's Artist of Uzbekistan – Kuzibayev Nemat Mirzaboevich
- Philosopher, Academician of the Academy of Sciences of Uzbekistan, Honored Scientist of Uzbekistan, Corresponding Member of the Russian Academy of Sciences, Doctor of Philosophy, Professor – Yusupov Erkin
- Philosopher, Academician of the Academy of Sciences of Uzbekistan, Honored Scientist of Uzbekistan, Honored Scientist of Karakalpakstan, Doctor of Philosophy, Professor – Khairullayev Muzaffar Muhitdinovich
- Mathematical scientist, academician of the Academy of Sciences of Uzbekistan, doctor of physical and mathematical sciences, professor – Farmonov Shokir Kasimovich
- Master of painting, academician of the Academy of Sciences of Uzbekistan – Tursunnazarov Yigitali
- Orientalist, source scientist, public figure, academician of the Academy of Sciences of Uzbekistan, Honored Scientist of Uzbekistan, Doctor of Philology, Professor – Ibrahimov Nematulla
- Potter, successor of the dynasty, a great representative of the modern Rishtan school of pottery, academician of the Academy of Arts of Uzbekistan, Honored Worker of Culture of Uzbekistan – Yusupov Sharofiddin Isomiddinovich
- The head of the Sado enterprise, academician of the Academy of Arts of Uzbekistan – Rahmonali Nortojiyev.
- People's Artist of Uzbekistan, Academician of the Academy of Arts of Uzbekistan – Sultanali Mannopov.

== Sister cities ==
- Yongin, South Korea (2008)
