= Gafur Rakhimov (general) =

Uzbekistani statesman

Acting Minister of Internal Affairs of Uzbekistan
- In office 25 August 1991 – 16 September 1991
- President: Islam Karimov
- Prime Minister: Shukurulla Mirsaidov
- Preceded by: Vyacheslav Kamalov
- Succeeded by: Zokir Almatov

Personal details
- Born: 1 February 1929 Andijan, Uzbek SSR, USSR
- Died: 19 September 2018 (aged 89) Tashkent, Uzbekistan
- Citizenship: Uzbekistan
- Profession: Jurist, statesman
- Awards: Shon-Sharaf Order, 2nd degree Shukhrat Medal; Order of the Red Banner of Labour; Jubilee Medal "In Commemoration of the 100th Anniversary of the Birth of Vladimir Ilyich Lenin"; Medal "For Distinction in the Protection of Public Order"; Medal "Veteran of Labour"; Jubilee Medal "50 Years of the Soviet Militia"

Military service
- Years of service: 1951—1994
- Rank: Major general

Gafur Rakhimovich Rakhimov (Uzbek: Gʻofur Rahimovich Rahimov, 1 February 1929, Andijan, Uzbek Soviet Socialist Republic — 19 September 2018, Tashkent, Uzbekistan) was an Uzbek jurist, statesman, public figure, and major general of police. From 1985 to 1994, he served as the Deputy Minister of Internal Affairs of Uzbekistan.

== Biography ==
From 1944 to 1947, worked as a worker and then as a master at the "Za Rodinu" (For Motherland) cooperative in Andijan. In 1951, graduated from Tashkent Militia School. In 1959, graduated from Andijan University Faculty of Law.

From 1951 to 1983, worked as an operative, senior operative, deputy head, and later head of the Department for Combating Embezzlement of Socialist Property (OBKhSS), Head of Public Order Management and Head of Andijan Regional Department of Internal Affairs. From 1983 to 1985 was a Head of Bukhara Regional Department of Internal Affairs. On 2 July 1983, he was ranked the Major General of Police.

From 1985 to 1991 was a Deputy Minister of Internal Affairs of Uzbek SSR, Head of Public Safety Service. On 8 June 1990, by decree of the President of Uzbek SSR, he was appointed commandant in Andijan Region. From 1991 to 1993 was First Deputy Minister of Internal Affairs of the Republic of Uzbekistan, Head of the Operational-Investigative Service. Simultaneously, from 25 August to 16 September 1991, he served as acting Minister of Internal Affairs. From 1993 to 1994 was a Deputy Minister of Internal Affairs of the Republic of Uzbekistan, Head of Public Safety Service.

He retired on 7 May 1994, and from that day until the end of his life served as the chairman of the Veterans Council of the Ministry of Internal Affairs of the Republic of Uzbekistan.

He passed away on 19 September 2018 at the age of 89. He was buried at Chigatay Cemetery.

== Awards ==
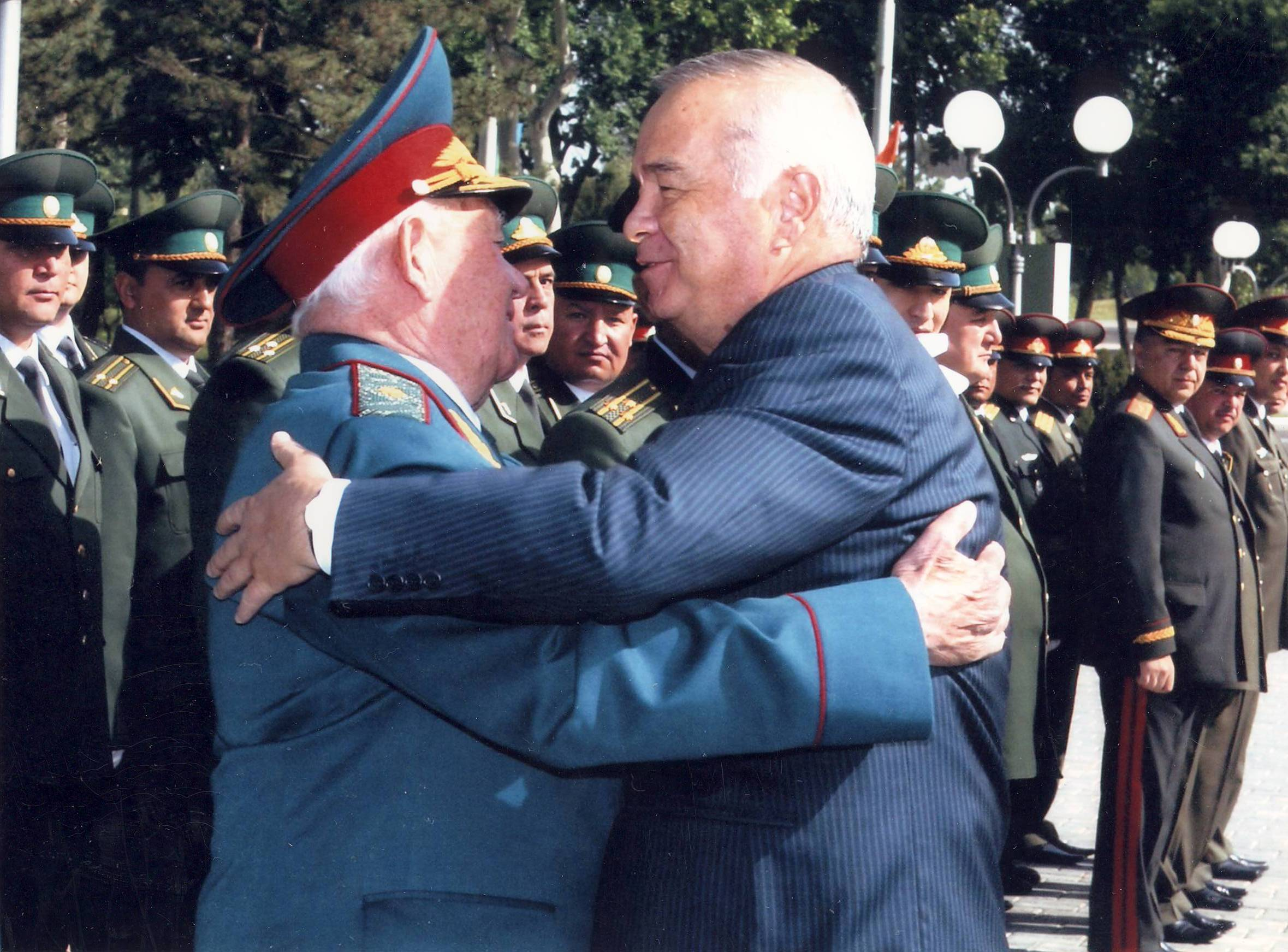
Gafur Rakhimov with the first President of Uzbekistan Islam Karimov on the Day of Remembrance and Honors at Independence Square. 9 May 2006

- Order of the Red Banner of Labour (1977)
- Honorary title of "Honored Lawyer of the Uzbek SSR" (8 December 1981)
- Certificate of Honor of the Republic of Uzbekistan (28 August 1992)
- Shuhrat Medal (1994)
- Order of Shon-sharaf, 2nd degree (1 February 1999)
- Honored Lawyer of Uzbekistan (1 February 2004)
- Commemorative badges for the 5th, 10th, 15th, 20th, and 25th anniversaries of the independence of the Republic of Uzbekistan, as well as commemorative badges for the 5th, 10th, 15th, 20th, and 25th anniversaries of the Armed Forces of the Republic of Uzbekistan.
- Honorary citizen of Bukhara.

== See also ==
- Botir Parpiyev
