= Law enforcement in Uzbekistan =

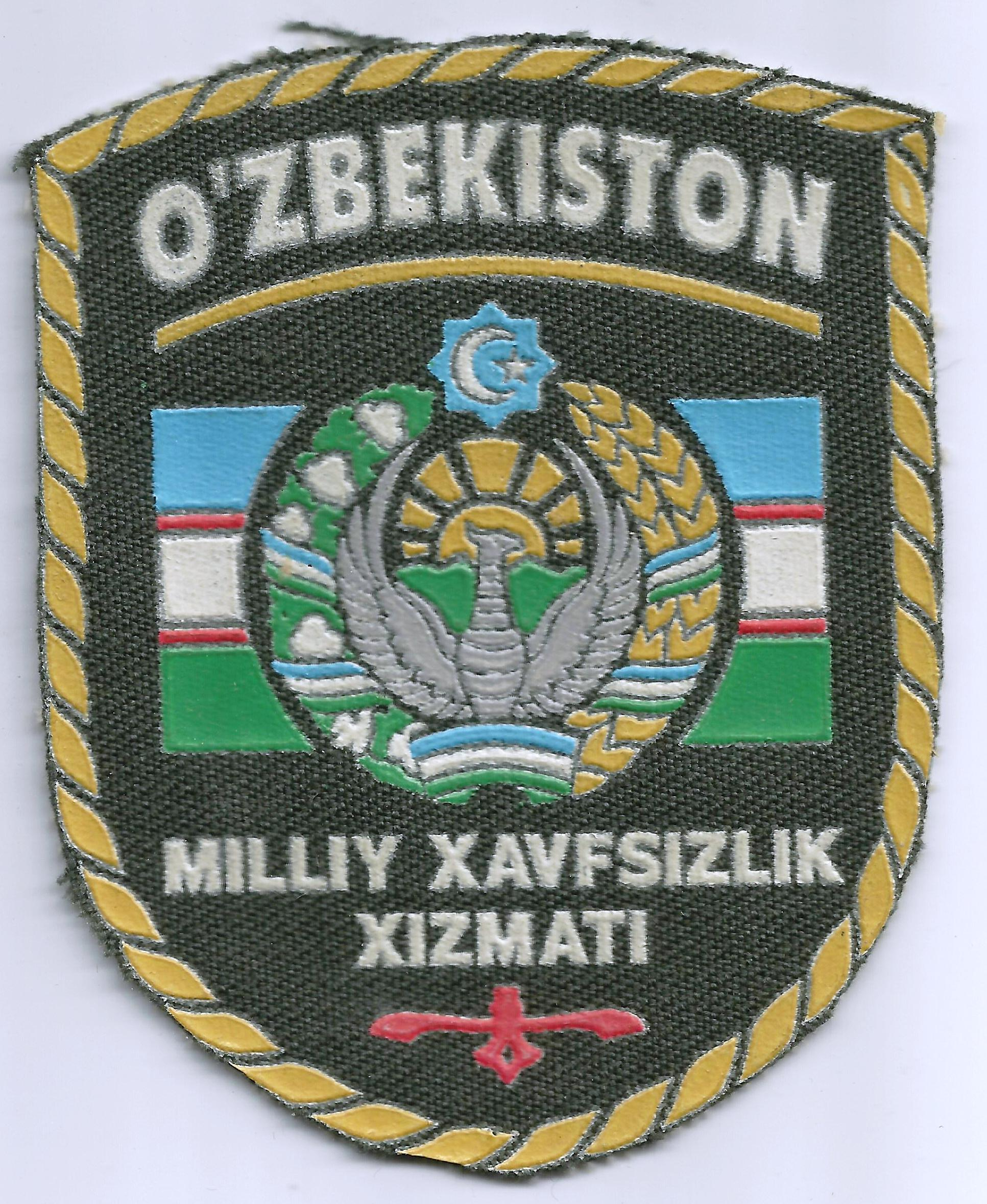
The Uzbek police emblem.

Law enforcement in Uzbekistan is the responsibility of the Ministry of Internal Affairs (MIA) and the National Security Service (NSS). The MIA commands the national police force, and led the border service until 2005, when it, along with the customs service, was placed under command of the NSS.

The National Security Service NSS; in Uzbek Milliy Xavfsizlik Xizmati, MXX.
