= Andijan massacre =

Violent incident in Andijan, Uzbekistan

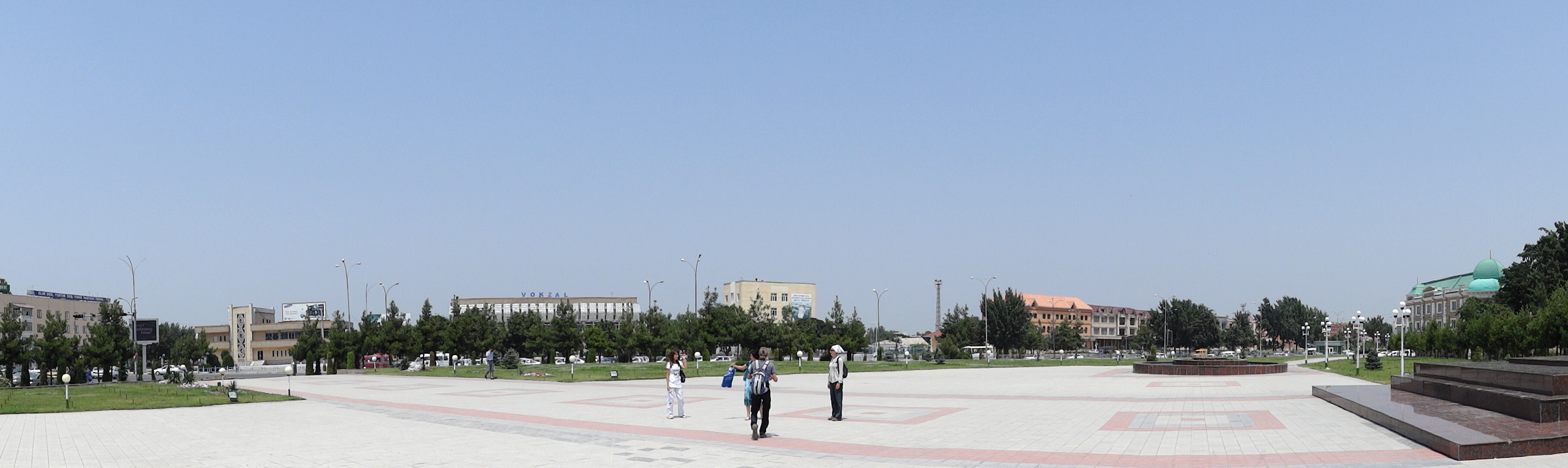
- Bobur Square, the location of the events
- Date: 13 May 2005; 21 years ago
- Location: Andijan, Uzbekistan
- Caused by: Corruption; Economic and social inequality; Authoritarianism and lack of civil liberties; Police and military brutality; Political, religious and ethnic conflicts
- Methods: Demonstrations; Nonviolent resistance; Civil disobedience; Riots
- Result: Violent suppression of protests.; EU arms embargo on Uzbekistan.; Expulsion of United States Armed Forces from K2 Air Base.

Parties
Protesters	Government of Uzbekistan; National Security Service; Ministry of the Interior; People's Democratic Party of Uzbekistan; Armed Forces of the Republic of Uzbekistan; Uzbek Ground Forces

Lead figures
No centralised leaders	Islam Karimov; Shavkat Mirziyoyev; Kadyr Gulyamov; Ismail Ergashev; Rustam Inoyatov; Zokir Almatov

Casualties
- Deaths: 187–1,500

On 13 May 2005, protests erupted in Andijan, Uzbekistan. At one point, troops from the Uzbek National Security Service (SNB) fired into a crowd of protesters. Estimates of those killed on 13 May range from 187, the official count of the government, to several hundred. A defector from the SNB alleged that 1,500 were killed. The bodies of many of those who died were allegedly hidden in mass graves following the massacre.

Three narratives concerning the events exist:

- The Uzbek government said the Islamic Movement of Uzbekistan organised the unrest and the protesters were members of Hizb ut-Tahrir.
- Critics of the government argue that the Islamist radical label provides a pretext for maintaining a repressive regime in the country.
- A third theory is that the dispute was really an inter-clan struggle for state power.

The Uzbek government did however acknowledge that poor economic conditions in the region and popular resentment played a role in the uprising. Troops may possibly have fired indiscriminately to quell a prison break.

It was claimed that calls from Western governments for an international investigation prompted a major shift in Uzbek foreign policy favouring closer relations with autocratic nations, although the Uzbek government is known to have close ties with the U.S. government, and the Bush administration had declared Uzbekistan to be vital to US security because it hired out a large military base to US military forces. The Uzbek government ordered the closing of the United States Karshi-Khanabad Air Base and improved ties with the People's Republic of China and the Russian Federation, who supported the government's response in Andijan.

== Trial of businessmen ==
The protesters initially asked for the release of 23 local businessmen who were arrested on 23 June 2004 and charged with "extremism, fundamentalism and separatism". The police subsequently charged them with membership in Akromiya, an organization the government has designated and banned as terrorist. The businessmen denied the charge, saying they were arrested because of their growing support among the local populace. Some accounts suggest that the arrests occurred as part of a purge of allies of Andijan's long-time provincial governor, Kobiljon Obidov, who had been impeached and replaced with Saydullo Begaliyev, allegedly at the behest of President Islam Karimov.

Melissa Hooper, a US lawyer in Tashkent who worked with the defense in the trial, said on 14 May, "This is more about [the businessmen] acquiring economic clout, and perhaps refusing to pay off the local authorities, than about any religious beliefs". Andrei Grozin, head of the Central Asia and Kazakhstan Department of the Institute of CIS Countries, said in an interview conducted by Rossiiskaya gazeta that authorities used the trial to "take away the business of several entrepreneurs under a clearly trumped-up pretext".

During the trials, protests in front of the courthouse were common. On 10 May another demonstration occurred involving at least 1,000 people. The protesters, mainly relatives of the defendants, videotaped the demonstration, which the police did not interrupt. Demonstrators lined the streets around the courthouse, with women on one side and men on the other. By 11 May over 4,000 demonstrators had gathered to hear the verdict. Prosecutors had asked for prison terms ranging from three to seven years for 20 of the accused, offering to free the remaining three. However, the government postponed the scheduled sentencing. The government arrested some of the protesters and relatives of the defendants late on 12 May.

== 13 May ==
On the night of 12 May or early in the morning of 13 May armed men attacked the prison where the businessmen were held and freed them, along with hundreds of other prisoners, many of whom were charged with similar charges; several prison guards were killed. The armed men, including the 23 defendants, also took over the regional administration building in Andijan, and took at least twenty law enforcement and government officials hostage, including the Head of the Prosecutors Office and the Chief of the Tax Inspection Authority. The militants unsuccessfully tried to seize the National Security Service (SNB) headquarters in the city. They demanded the resignation of President Islam Karimov. Karimov's press office said that "intensive negotiations" proved fruitless. "The militants, taking cover behind women and children, are refusing any compromise", the statement said.

Encouraged by the prison break, even more protesters gathered in the central square to voice their anger over growing poverty and government corruption, speaking at microphones that were installed at Babur Square. Though government officials blocked the roads to Babur Square in the morning, they let people through on foot. Someone (it is unclear who) set fire to the Babur theater and cinema.

Government soldiers blocked the streets to the prison. Shooting incidents began in the morning; there was at least one exchange of gunfire between armed civilians and troops. But protesters remained on the square, apparently because of rumors that Karimov was coming to address their demands or because attempts to exit the square or surrender were refused.

Around 17:00 or 18:00, the government launched a major offensive on the square without warning. There are reports that the protesters used government hostages as human shields in the front row as they tried to escape. According to Human Rights Watch, the government then sealed off the perimeter of the protest and opened fire. Some reports indicate indiscriminate firing by government troops, including the use of snipers, automatic rifles, and armoured personnel carriers. It is unclear whether Karimov personally ordered the attack.

Galima Bukharbaeva, a journalist for IWPR, witnessed a "mass of dead and wounded. At first, one group of armoured-personnel carriers approached the [city] square, and then another group appeared. They opened fire without mercy on everyone indiscriminately, including women and children. The crowd began to run in all directions. We dove into a ditch and lay there for a while. I saw at least five bloody corpses next to me. The rebels who are holding the provincial administration opened fire in response. They intend to stand to the end! When we got out of the ditch, we ran along the streets into the neighbourhood and now we're looking for a place where there's no shooting. But shots can be heard everywhere...". The Uzbek government disputes this and states that only "terrorists" were killed.

Several foreign news sources estimated the dead in Andijan as numbering between 400 and 600, with civilians accounting for almost all the victims. Some reports stated that troops had systematically shot the wounded after the first shootings. Uzbek President Islam Karimov "placed blame for the unrest on Islamic extremist groups, a label that he has used to describe political opponents in recent years and that his critics say is used as a pretext for maintaining a repressive state". A press release from the government stated that "As a result of the clashes, 9 people died and 34 were injured". The government-controlled media within the country broadcast only brief statements regarding the crisis. In its news bulletins, Uzbek State TV said "an armed group of criminals" had attacked the security forces in Andijan: "The bandits seized dozens of weapons and moved on to attack a correctional colony, setting some convicts free". Describing the rebels as "extremists", they claimed that nine people had been killed and 34 wounded during the clashes. The local radio station had reportedly been taken off air. Authorities also blocked foreign TV news channels, including CNN and the BBC News.

=== Allegations of government involvement ===
According to Ikrom Yakubov, a major in Uzbekistan's secret service who defected to Britain in 2007, the government "propped up" Akramia, which the Uzbek government blamed for fomenting the sparking the incident led to the protests. He believes that the attacks were used as a pretext to repress dissenters. According to Yakubov, President Karimov personally ordered government troops to fire on the protesters.

In some accounts, the troops involved in the quelling of the uprising were from the Interior Ministry. Burnashev and Chernykh report that the 12,500 troops involved included the "17th air-assault brigade and a battalion of specialized operations from the Eastern military district (Military of Uzbekistan); a brigade of rapid reaction forces and a separate battalion of Special Forces "Bars" of the Ministry of Interior's internal troops; and four separate units of Special Forces of the National Security Service".

== Mass graves ==
Muhammad Solih, founder and leader of the Erk/Liberty Democratic Party political party in Uzbekistan, estimated more than a thousand casualties in the massacre. Solih said the bodies were buried in mass graves holding 15 to 20 people each, or were thrown into the Karasu River. Between 13 and 14 May, 18 flights took 35 or more bodies from Andijan out of the city. Solih said, "Andijan is a litmus test for countries who want influence in the region. Russia sees Central Asia as the source for religious extremism, while China fears a growth of internal separatists", but "neither wants to recognize that Karimov gives strength to what they fear". The Chinese and Russian governments' support for the Uzbek government allowed it to avoid an international investigation.

Juraboy, a citizen of Andijan, led a Radio Free Europe correspondent to a mass grave on the far end of the city on 27 May 2005. Gravediggers told Radio Free Europe that 74 bodies were buried in the grave, and that there were 37 more secret graves, each containing two bodies, in the area. Three trucks brought the first bodies on 13 May. On 28 May, two people murdered Juraboy. Some families of the deceased found the graves of their relatives, dug up the bodies, and reburied them according to Islamic burial rites. There is another known mass grave outside of Andijan in the botanical gardens in the center of the city. Vitaly Ponomaryov, director of the Central Asia Program at the Moscow-based Memorial Human Rights Center, said, "planes flew out of Andijon beginning late in the evening on 13 May. In the course of 24 hours, there were around 18 flights. Our source for this information doesn't know where they were flying to, but he spoke with an eyewitness who talked about 36 bodies that were loaded into one plane alone."

== Aftermath ==
Despite the violent crushing of the protests, the following day thousands reappeared to demonstrate. Huge crowds shouted "killers, murderers", and again demanded the president step down. One man, speaking of the previous days' events, said, "People were raising their hands up in the air showing they were without arms but soldiers were still shooting at them".

On 14 May thousands seeking to flee the country stormed government buildings in the eastern frontier town of Qorasuv, 50 km east of Andijan. They torched police offices and cars, before attacking guards on the Kyrgyz border. Uzbek troops sealed off the town. Authorities in Kyrgyzstan turned 6,000 Uzbeks away. Uzbek army helicopters were seen circling overhead.

Saidjahon Zaynabitdinov, head of Appeal, an Uzbek human rights organization, said 200 people were killed in Pakhtabad district on 14 May when government troops fought with a group crossing the border into Kyrgyzstan. On 21 May police arrested him.

According to The New York Times, "There were reports of skirmishes in or near Andijon and of hundreds, perhaps thousands, of refugees making their way to Kyrgyzstan. There were indications that the Uzbek government, which normally maintains strict order, did not have full control of a portion of the valley."

Numerous journalists were forced to flee the country following their coverage of the massacre, including Galima Bukharbaeva and German reporter Marcus Bensmann. The state charged these journalists in absentia with "providing informational support to terrorism".

Peace Corps Uzbekistan closed its post in response to increased security threats, according to policy that corresponds with the security level of the in-country United States Embassy.

On 16 May several foreign news sources estimated the dead in Andijan as numbering between 400 and 600, with civilians accounting for almost all the victims. One report stated that troops had systematically shot the wounded after the first shootings. A press release on the same day on the official government website continued to maintain that "As a result of the clashes, 9 people died [sic] and 34 were injured". In 2008, defector Ikrom Yakubov, a major in the SNB at the time of the incident, alleged that 1,500 people were killed – over twice the highest number estimated by outside observers.

In October 2005 an Uzbek court found several Kyrgyz citizens guilty of several crimes revolving around involvement in the Andijan massacre. The government denied access to observers and refused to identify the defendants as the trial proceeded.

In a 60-page report based on 50 interviews with victims and witnesses of the Andijan crackdown, Human Rights Watch said the killing of unarmed protesters by the Uzbek government on 13 May was so extensive and unjustified that it amounted to a massacre.

The song "Anda Jonim Qoldi Mening" (English: Over There Remains This Soul of Mine) about Andijan by Sherali Jo'rayev was popularized by the incident. The line Andijonim qoldi mening (meaning my Andijan remains) from the poetry of the first Mughal emperor Babur, a native of Andijan, was one of the most used phrases on the Uzbek-language internet after the uprisings.

Several documentary films have been made about the Andijan uprising and its impact on the lives of those caught up in it. In 2010, the British journalist Monica Whitlock, who was the BBC correspondent in Uzbekistan at the time, made the 55-minute film Through the Looking Glass. The film incorporates testimony from survivors, who speak for the first time five years after the massacre. In 2012, the Danish journalist Michael Andersen completed the 80-minute film Massacre in Uzbekistan.

== Non-governmental organizations ==
After non-governmental organizations criticized the government's response, non-governmental organizations based in the Western world had their operations in Uzbekistan shut down on charges some analysts have criticized as spurious. In April 2006 an Uzbek court ordered the American Bar Association to end its activities after it gave funding to local non-governmental organizations. On 26 July an Uzbek court ordered Winrock International, which gave technical expertise to farmers, to leave because the court found it had "denigrated national values". The Uzbek government ordered Central Asian Free Exchange to leave on 7 July on the grounds that it had an "unregistered logo" and lacked an "Internet license". Urban Institute received an order to shut down on 12 July because their officials discussed "the socioeconomic and sociopolitical situation in Uzbekistan" during a "training session for a homeowner society", a violation of their charter. Other organizations that were ordered or pressured to leave Uzbekistan shortly after the Andijan massacre include Global Involvement through Education, Ecumenical Charity Service, Eurasia Foundation, Freedom House, the International Research & Exchanges Board, Counterpart International, Radio Free Europe/Radio Liberty, the American Council for Collaboration in Education and Language Study, Internews Network, BBC World Service, Ezgulik, and the Uzbek branch of the UNHCR.

== External reactions ==
=== European Union ===
On 3 October 2005 the European Union imposed an arms embargo on Uzbekistan and decided to deny visas to top Uzbek officials, in response to an "excessive, disproportionate and indiscriminate use of force", and because of the Uzbek government's opposition to an international investigation into the events. In November 2006 the EU renewed the sanctions but agreed to resume low-level talks.

British Foreign Secretary Jack Straw said on 15 May that "there had been a clear abuse of human rights" in Uzbekistan.

German Foreign Minister Frank-Walter Steinmeier met with Uzbek Foreign Minister Vladimir Norov in March 2007. He told the foreign ministers of the governments of European Union member nations in Brussels on 5 March that the government of Uzbekistan may be willing to let the International Committee of the Red Cross visit prisons in Uzbekistan, hold talks on the Andijan massacre with EU officials, and letting EU officials reexamine human rights cases in return for an end to the sanctions imposed by the EU following the incidents in Andijan. Steinmeier visited Uzbekistan again from 6–9 April to further assess the effects of the economic sanctions and how to proceed. Uzbek Foreign Minister Vladimir Norov stressed the need to respect Uzbekistan's sovereignty when an EU delegation met with officials from Central Asian governments in Astana, Kazakhstan on 27–28 March. Pierre Morel, the European Union's special representative to Central Asia, said continuing negotiations would be positive.

=== Shanghai Cooperation Organisation members ===
The Shanghai Cooperation Organisation, composed of Russia, China, Kazakhstan, Kyrgyzstan, Tajikistan, and Uzbekistan, characterized the Andijan massacre as a terrorist plot. The SCO passed resolutions in July 2005 calling for nations to deny asylum to Uzbek refugees from Andijan in Kyrgyzstan.

Andijan protesters had called for help from Vladimir Putin, but Russian Foreign Minister Sergey Lavrov told a press conference after meeting with the foreign ministers of Collective Security Treaty Organization (CSTO) member nations, "Uzbekistan is not a CSTO member, and we don't interfere in the internal affairs of other countries".

Kyrgyzstan, which had recently undergone a revolution, closed its border with Uzbekistan.

=== United States ===
When asked about the government's response to the incident, State Department spokesman Richard Boucher said the U.S. government has been "very consistently critical of the human rights situation in Uzbekistan, we're very concerned about the outbreak of violence in Andijan, in particular the escape of prisoners, including possibly members of the Islamic Movement of Uzbekistan, an organization we consider a terrorist organization. I think at this point we're looking to all the parties involved to exercise restraint to avoid any unnecessary loss of life." At another point Boucher said, "It's becoming increasingly clear that very large numbers of civilians were killed by the indiscriminate use of force by Uzbek forces. There needs to be a credible and a transparent accounting to establish the facts of the matter of what occurred in Andijon. At the same time I think it is clear that the episode began by an armed attack on the prison and on other government facilities. There are reports of hostage-taking and other claims that should be investigated. Nothing justified such acts of violence." Craig Murray, the ambassador of the United Kingdom to Uzbekistan, criticized the US government's position, calling it a "sickening response".

A bipartisan group of U.S. senators criticized the State Department's reaction and called for a United Nations investigation: "We believe that the United States must be careful about being too closely associated with a government that has killed hundreds of demonstrators and refused international calls for a transparent investigation".

After the Andijan massacre United States State Department officials argued in favor of ending all US ties to Uzbekistan, whereas the United States Defense Department argued that the US should take a look at each program and decide on a case-by-case basis. Defense Secretary Donald Rumsfeld opposed an international investigation into the incident.

== Clan struggle theory ==
One interpretation of the unrest and the preceding trial mainly espoused by Central Asian scholars is an inter-clan struggle between the Tashkent-Ferghana clan alliance and the rival Samarkand clan.

On 25 May 2004 the legislative chamber of Andijan's regional government voted to impeach Kobiljon Obidov, the Governor of Andijan and a leading member of the Ferghana clan, replacing him with Saydullo Begaliyev, the former Minister of Agriculture and Water in the national government. Governor Obidov's involvement in several political scandals lost him favor with President Karimov, who personally attended his impeachment proceedings. According to an anonymous source who spoke with EurasiaNet Obidov "was the province's master... businesses favored by the hokim got the green light for everything. All the entrepreneurs who enjoyed [Obidov's] patronage", including the 23 businessmen, "grew rich". In late 2004 Karimov appointed Ikromkhon Nazhmiddinov, who succeeded Begaliyev as the Minister of Agriculture and Water, Governor of Ferghana province.

The source said, "Criminal proceedings were started against many of his [Obidov's] administration members. The new hokim also decided to re-divide the businesses in the province; he cracked down on the entrepreneurs who had been supported by Obidov. They were told to sell their businesses for a pittance either to him [Begaliyev] or his people, or face legal proceedings."

Prior to the Andijan massacre the Samarkand clan maintained control over the Interior Ministry under the leadership of Zakir Almatov and the Tashkent clan controlled the National Security Service under the leadership of Rustam Innoyatov. Rustam Burnashev and Irina Chernykh of the Central Asia-Institute argue that rumors of Karimov's resignation due to ill-health prompted the two leaders to try to seize power. Both leaders considered coup d'états in 2004, early 2005, and in mid-2005.

During the unrest security forces under the authority of the Ministry of Defense acted as police forces. Ministry of Interior troops were abolished and counter-terrorism divisions were put under the command of the Ministry of Defense or the National Security Service (SNB), run by the Tashkent clan. Karimov fired Defense Minister Kadyr Gulyamov, Interior Minister Almatov, Head of the Joint Headquarters of the Armed Forces Ismail Ergashev, and Commander of the Eastern military district Kosimali Akhmedov. Karimov replaced Almatov with the deputy director of the SNB, a member of the Tashkent clan. This greatly shifted control of security to the Tashkent clan which has traditionally controlled the SNB. Analysts had previously suggested that the Interior Ministry, under Almatov's leadership, had organized the 1999 Tashkent bombings. Others have suggested the bombings were done by the SNB under the leadership of Rustam Inoyatov, who at the time led the Tashkent clan. Analysts suggested a series of bombings in 2004 in Tashkent and Bukhara may have been done by the SNB against the Interior Ministry.

Dilyor Jumabayev, a prominent member of Hizb ut-Tahrir, later said in an interview in Kara-Suu, Kyrgyzstan that in February 2005 SNB agents offered to pay Hizb ut-Tahrir members to overthrow Andijan's government; "But we refused. They said they were sick and tired of Karimov's regime. But we said, 'After Karimov will come another Karimov.' We said such things are sin. We did not participate."

Obidov, initially put under house arrest, is now imprisoned in Tashkent. Karimov replaced Begaliyev with Akhmad Usmanov, the former security head of the Interior Ministry of Namangan province, on 13 October 2006.

Ikbol Mirsaitov, a Kyrgyz expert on Islam, said that trial and subsequent unrest "was all about clan struggle".

== See also ==
- 1999 Tashkent bombings
- Moscow theater hostage crisis
- 2010 South Kyrgyzstan riots
- History of Uzbekistan
- Human rights in Uzbekistan
- Islam in Uzbekistan
- Politics of Uzbekistan
- 2019-2020 Uzbekistan protests
- 2019-2020 Iranian protests
- Fergana massacre
- 2010 South Kyrgyzstan ethnic clashes
- Rabaa massacre
