= Rashid Kadyrov =

Rashid Kadirov (Rashitjon) Hamidovich
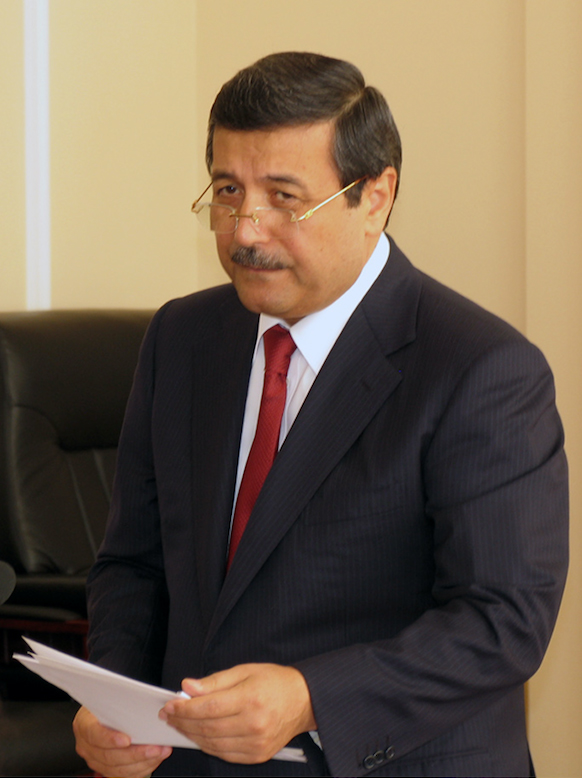

Prosecutor General in the Government of Uzbekistan
- In office April 25, 2000 – April 21, 2015
- Preceded by: Khudaikulov, Usman Chinazovich
- Succeeded by: Ikhtiyor Abdullayev

Personal details
- Born: Rashid Kadirov; Uzbek: Rashitjon Hamidovich Qodirov; February 24, 1952 (age 74) Andijan, Uzbek Soviet Socialist Republic
- Party: Centre-right politics
- Education: National University of Uzbekistan
- Occupation: Prosecutor general of Uzbekistan

Rashitjon (Rashid) Hamidovich Qodirov (Uzbek Cyrillic: Рашиджон (Рашид) Ҳамидович Қодиров, Russian: Рашид (Рашитжон) Хамидович Кадиров; born 24 February 1952) – former prosecutor general of Uzbekistan, served as prosecutor general in the government of Uzbekistan in 2004. He was arrested on February 22, 2018 on suspicion of abuse of office, abuse of power and bribery. Human rights groups and organisations voiced their concern that since being detained he has been subjected to torture to force him to incriminate himself.

== Biography ==
Graduated from the Law Faculty of Tashkent State University in 1975, from 1976 to 1980 Kadirov worked as an investigator and senior investigator in the Andijan region prosecutor's office he later joined the State Committee for Security of the Uzbek SSR in 1980, and then became the head of the Investigative Committee. In 1992–1993 he held the post of deputy chairman of the National Security Service (NSS) of the Republic of Uzbekistan. He retired from the service in the position of the head of the Investigation Department of the National Security Service. On January 28, 1994, he was appointed deputy prosecutor general of the General Prosecutor's Office of the Republic of Uzbekistan. On May 25, 2000, he was appointed prosecutor general. Approved for a new term in this position twice: in March 2005 and in May 2010. From May 2015 to August 2017, he was a member of the Constitutional Court of the Republic of Uzbekistan. Kadirov was detained on February 21, 2018, on suspicion of abuse of office, abuse of power and bribery. Credible reports from sources close to Kadirov indicate that since being detained on February 21, 2018 he has been subjected to psychological abuse, death threats, sleep deprivation and threats against his relatives, to force him to incriminate himself.

== Anti-terrorist activities ==
During 1999—2005 Qodirov was one of the key figures in the struggle against wave of terrorism in Uzbekistan. Qodirov was head of all investigations of terrorist attacks and formulated a program for carrying out preventive counter-terrorism actions by the country's special services. At the same time, he was one of the targets of terrorists in the series of terrorist attacks in mid-February 2004. As head of the investigative commission, Qodirov established that militants of Al-Qaeda are behind the attacks and made this information public. One of Qodirov's briefings noted that terrorists, in particular from the Islamic Movement of Turkestan, were trained by Arab instructors in the militant training camps in Pakistan.

After the suicide attack on Friday July 30, 2004, which targeted the Israeli and American embassies and the office of Uzbekistan's chief prosecutor, Qodirov worked with the experts from United States, Israel and (Germany). The group under his leadership established that terrorists used explosives that could only be made by those who were trained in the terrorist camps in Chechnya and Afghanistan. According to a number of experts, it was the actions of investigators led by Qodirov that contributed to the cessation of the wave of terror.

== Detention and investigation ==
On April 20, 2015, Qodirov was dismissed from the post of prosecutor general. Ikhtiyor Abdullayev, the state adviser to the president of the republic, was appointed in his place. Qodirov's sudden resignation was attributed to the fact that he had earlier accused in economic crimes the daughter of the president of Uzbekistan, Gulnara Karimova. Since May 2015, Qodirov was one of the judges of the Constitutional Court of the Republic of Uzbekistan. He was arrested on February 22, 2018. The prosecutor's office tried to hide his arrest from the media: on February 23, in a conversation with the “Ozodlik" reporter, the spokesman for the Prosecutor General's Office of Uzbekistan, Vohid Sharopov, said that "Kadirov is not arrested and no investigative actions are being taken against him". Prosecutor General's Office hid the arrest from the media until February 24. Two days after the arrest the Prosecutor General's Office issued press-release and stated that "the General Prosecutor's Office of the Republic of Uzbekistan instituted criminal proceedings against the former Prosecutor General R. H. Qodirov under articles 165, 205, 210 of the Criminal Code of the Republic of Uzbekistan".

At the beginning of May 2018 media reported that the state of health of 66-year-old Qodirov during the interrogations deteriorated significantly, as he was under severe pressure, and medical assistance was insufficient. At the same time, sources in the Ministry of Internal Affairs reported that there is still a long wait before Qodirov will be charged with anything, because it is a very large-scale case. Despite this, on May 21, 2018, the President of Uzbekistan, Shavkat Mirziyayev, promised that he would force Rashid Qodirov to publicly declare himself guilty on national television.

== Trial and torture ==
The trial of Kadirov and his co-defendants began behind closed doors on January 7, 2019 in Yunusabad District Criminal Court. Kadirov has been charged under 12 articles of the Criminal code for offences including fraud.

Credible reports from sources close to Kadirov indicate that since being detained on February 21, 2018 he has been subjected to psychological abuse, death threats, sleep deprivation and threats against his relatives, to force him to incriminate himself. The sources report that during a 10-month criminal investigation in 2018, more than 40 people, including Kadirov's relatives, were summoned to testify and that some of them were arbitrarily detained, beaten, and otherwise ill-treated by law enforcement officers. All the witnesses have been released. Three co-defendants released from pre-trial detention in August 2018 remain under house arrest. Kadirov and the remaining nine co-defendants held in pre-trial detention since February 2018 are at continued risk of torture and other ill-treatment.

On April 8, Amnesty distributed a letter addressed to Uzbek President Shavkat Mirziyoev urging him to "ensure [Rashidjon Qodirov] and his 12 co-defendants are protected from torture and other ill-treatment and that they have prompt access to necessary and adequate medical care". Amnesty International, the Association for Human Rights in Central Asia (AHRCA), Human Rights Watch (HRW), International Partnership for Human Rights (IPHR), and the Norwegian Helsinki Committee express deep concern about allegations that Rashitjon Kadirov, former prosecutor general of Uzbekistan, and his twelve co-defendants have been tortured and suffered other forms of ill-treatment in government custody.

Kadyrov was paroled on December 29, 2022.

== Personal life ==
Kadirov's son, Rashitjon, owns several properties in Dubai. Rashitjon is wanted by Uzbek authorities for alleged extortion and fraud.
