= Temurbek Military Schools =

Temurbek Military Schools (Uzbek: Temurbeklar Maktabi, Темурбеклар мактаби) are militarized boarding schools in the Republic of Uzbekistan for boys of 14–18. They were founded by decree of President Shavkat Mirziyoyev on 28 June 2019, in a resolution "On additional measures to improve the system of military-patriotic education of young men and training of a personnel reserve for the Armed Forces of the Republic of Uzbekistan and public service". Education in these schools focused on military related subjects. The school system consists of military senior high schools within the Ministry of Defense, Ministry of Internal Affairs and Ministry Emergency Situations, as well as the State Security Service and the National Guard.

They are named after Turco-Mongol conqueror Timur.

== Status ==
In accordance with the presidential decree, the duration of study at the schools is two years with an annual admission quota of 100 cadets. Graduates of the schools' campuses are generally granted admission into higher military educational institutions of the Armed Forces, where they begin their studies towards an officer's commission. Test scores count towards 30% of the test scores for admission into higher military and specialized educational institutions, and 15% towards admission to other universities of the country.

== Role and selection ==
The main tasks of the schools are to:

- Form a deep respect for the Uzbek people, its culture and traditions.
- Develop a basis of the history of Uzbekistan
- Develop in students a broad outlook, intellectual potential, creative and analytical thinking.
- Prepare candidates for admission to higher military and specialized educational institutions of the republic.

They accept male citizens who have a certificate of completion of the 9th grade. It operates on the basis of the charter of the school. Tests approved by the State Commission on Admission to Educational Institutions are conducted to determine whether the candidate's knowledge meets the requirements of the state educational standards. Candidates can take the test in one of three languages: Uzbek, Karakalpak and Russian.

== Active schools ==
Branch	Location	Preceding institution	Parent institution
Ministry of Defense	Fergana	Fergana Academic Lyceum of Military-Technical Department of the Ministry of Defense	Fergana State University; Armed Forces Academy
State Security Service	Qibray District	Qibray Military Academic Lyceum	Uzbekistan State University of World Languages; State Security Service Institute
Ministry of Internal Affairs	Nukus	Academic Lyceum under the Nukus Branch of the Tashkent Pediatric Medical Institute	Berdakh Karakalpak State University; Academy of the Ministry of Internal Affairs
National Guard	Tashkent	Tashkent Military Academic Lyceum	Military-Technical Institute of the National Guard
Ministry of Emergency Situations	Shahrisabz	Shahrisabz College of Economics	Karshi State University; Academy of the Ministry of Emergency Situations

== See also ==
- Suvorov Military School
- Astana Zhas Ulan Republican School
- Jamshid Nakhchivanski Military Lyceum
- Mastibek Tashmukhamedov Military Lyceum of the Ministry of Defense of Tajikistan
- Berdimuhamed Annayev 1st Specialized Military School
