= Clans in Central Asia =

Political networks in Central Asia

Clans in Central Asia are political networks based on regional and tribal loyalties. Clans frequently control certain government departments, though there is fluidity between clan loyalty and membership in government agencies. The people of Central Asia self-identified by their clans prior to Russian expansion in the 19th century. After the fall of the USSR, the informal agreements between the clans were the only means with which to stabilize the new Republics. Ethnic identity did not come into play until as late as the 1980s during glasnost. The influence of the clans in the contemporary history of Central Asia is derived from the enormous importance that these have held in the past. The weaker states of Central Asia have relied on the social salience of clans to secure their own legitimacy through pacts and informal agreements. These pacts guarantee that the clans have informal access to power and resources and have allowed for the clans to become central actors in post-Soviet politics

== History ==
Whereas Czarist colonialism had generally left Central Asia’s clans alone, Lenin declared in 1918 that the Bolsheviks would modernize the region and make its peoples into “Soviet nations.” But the vast communist bureaucracy of the Soviet party-state often failed to provide the social and economic goods it promised, and Soviet-forged identities (whether ethnonational or communist) put down only the shallowest of roots in Central Asia. Ironically, the Soviet institutions designed to destroy clans actually wound up making them stronger. The collectivization and “nationalities” policies of the 1920s and 1930s were meant to modernize clans out of existence by turning wandering herdspeople into sedentary Soviet subjects and overwhelming old clan affiliations with new and larger “national” identities such as Kyrgyz, Turkmen, or Kazakh. However, clan members adapted and survived. They also learned to use Soviet affirmative-action policies for titular nationalities as channels for promoting kinfolk within the Soviet system. During the three decades under Nikita Khrushchev and Leonid Brezhnev, moreover, Moscow intervened relatively little in Central Asia’s republic-level politics, and both larger and smaller clans were able to maintain their networks with resources from the Soviet state.^{[Unreliable Source]}

After Brezhnev’s death in 1982, the decline of the Soviet regime brought new instability to Central Asia. From 1984 to 1988, Moscow staged massive purges of the dominant clans in Uzbekistan and Kyrgyzstan. Mikhail Gorbachev installed a large ethnically Russian cadre from Moscow in most positions of economic and political power. All told, his efforts to shake up the traditional system of power resulted in the imprisonment of an estimated 30,000 Central Asian leaders. But the deeper trend unleashed by Gorbachev’s perestroika eroded the power of the party-state. Clans reasserted themselves, seizing opportunities to coordinate against Moscow and show that they would no longer remain quiet under its heavy hand. In Kyrgyzstan and Uzbekistan, clan elites brokered informal pacts to reclaim power. They used the ethnic unrest and riots of 1989–90 to delegitimize Gorbachev’s appointees and put forward their own candidates for the high post of republic first secretary, which in a nutshell is how both Akayev and Karimov first rose to power.

== Clan identity ==
The clan is an informal identity network based on kinship ties and is common in semimodern societies. In such societies identities embedded in informal networks such as clans are stronger than formally institutionalised ethnonational and religious identities. Where clan networks are powerful social actors, they deter ethnonational or religious conflict and foster social stability. Also, where clans are such powerful social actors, they play a role in the elite-level politics of transition, negotiation, and conflict as well. Unlike clientelism, clans are entire webs or networks of relations, horizontal and vertical, which remain bound by identity bonds as the economic necessity of patronage rises and falls. Although often regionally based, since localism helps maintain ties, clans depend upon the genealogical or kinship relationship, which supersedes migration, language or religion.

Clans include both elite and non-elite members, at different levels of society and state. Clan elites are those with power, and often money, who through birth and accomplishment have status and prominence within the clan. Clan elites can be regional governors and kolkhoz chairmen, if the clan is powerful, or simply village elders in a less powerful clan. In either case, elites are normatively and rationally bound to the well-being of their clan network. They provide political, social, and economic opportunities to their network and rely on its loyalty and respect to maintain their status. The particularistic ties and repeated interactions that characterise clans build trust and a sense of reciprocity, enabling the people involved to make contracts that extend over time. The informal ties and networks of clan life reduce the high transaction costs of making deals in an environment where impersonal institutions are weak or absent and stable expectations are hard to form. Clans in fact serve as an alternative to formal market institutions and official bureaucracies.

According to academics, the size of the clans may vary anywhere between 2,000 and 20,000 individuals per group. While the elder’s council still governs the clan in rural areas, in urban settings this last is flanked by the élite. The élite need the support of their network in order to maintain their status, protect their group and obtain gains within the political and economic system. The non-élite need the senior clan members in order to find work, have access to scholastic institutions, do business at the bazaar, obtain a loan or procure goods.

Data from three Central Asian countries-Uzbekistan, Kyrgyzstan, and Tajikistan-suggest that clan identity is more salient than ethnonationality and religion and is the critical variable in understanding stability and conflict.

== Kyrgyzstan ==
Kyrgyz generally refer to either their historic tribe or clan. Kyrgyz use the traditional word uruu, as well as the Russian term rod or klan. They both refer to a clan name, which defines their kin-based network, located in a village or cluster of villages and collectives. In addition to blood, inhabitants are bound by extensive marital ties and thus are fictively members of the same clan.

There are three "wings", or groups of clans, that control the Government of Kyrgyzstan: the Ong or "right", the Sol or "left", and the Ichkilik.

- There are seven clans in Sol, which is based in northern and western Kyrgyzstan, including the Sarybagysh clan, and the Buguu clan which controlled the Kirgiz SSR until the Great Purge of the 1930s. Kyrgyz political leaders have come from the Sarybagysh clan since the rule of Joseph Stalin. In 1990 the clan used its influence to ensure Askar Akayev became the Secretary of the Kyrgyz Communist Party instead of southerner Absamat Masaliyev. Until the Tulip Revolution of 2005 the Sarybagysh clan had control over the ministries of finance, internal affairs, foreign affairs, state security and the presidential staff.
- The Ong group consists of one clan, the Adygine, based in the south.
- The Ichkilik is also a southern grouping, but has non-ethnic Kyrgyz members.

== Uzbekistan ==
Uzbeks often associate klan with the mafia and are thus reluctant to refer to their local network as a clan. Uzbeks speak of their rod (the less charged Russian term), urug, or avlod. They consider not only their village, in which most inhabitants are somehow related by blood or fictive kinship, but usually several neighbouring villages, linked by marital alliances, to be part of that clan.

The most powerful clan in Uzbekistan is the Samarkand clan, which has traditionally controlled the Interior Ministry; Uzbek President Islam Karimov was a member of the Samarkand clan, which is based in Samarkand, Bukhara, Dzhizak and Navoi, and is allied with the weaker Jizak clan. The Tashkent clan, which controls the National Security Service (SNB), is allied with the Ferghana clan (sometimes considered to be the same clan), and the Khorezm clan which is based in Khorezm and southern Karakalpakistan. The Tashkent clan is based in Tashkent and in Ferghana, Andijan and Namangan through its alliance.

== Tajikistan ==
Detailed data on clan identity in Tajikistan is lacking. However, Tajiks also use the term klan. The Tajik regime has publicly denounced the political influence of clans. Clan divisions, however, frequently appear at the regional and subregional levels, where the Soviet regime transplanted entire Garmi, Pamiri, and Badakhshani clan villages to south-central Tajikistan in the 1950s and 1960s. Tajikistan was dragged into a bloody civil war over the failure of a pact between the clans. Another pact ended the conflict and, with the support of Russia, the country has been able to establish a new rule. A minority clan presently holds power but depends entirely on Russian support.

== Clan politics and conflict ==
Since 1991, Central Asians themselves have repeatedly worried aloud about the corruption and destabilization sown by klannovaya politika (“clan politics”). In the weaker Central Asian states, a clan assumes ever greater political importance because the bureaucracies cannot adequately provide for the needs of the society and the formal institutions lack legitimisation. After the fall of the USSR, the informal agreements between the clans were the only means with which to stabilize the new Republics. Aside from the eventual presence of external threats that could bring the otherwise isolated groups to collaborate with each other and a certain equilibrium between the more important clans, the essential condition that would permit the creation of such informal agreements was the identification of a leader capable of mediating the interests of all of the clans. Once they enter into effect, the agreements between clans ensure the durability of the State for as long as this last protects the clan’s interests.

In a situation of great economic uncertainty, the clans become strong competitors to the State and, being more efficient in providing for the needs of their members, the clans become more powerful and influential than the State institutions. In order to meet all of the requests of their affiliates, the clans must subtract an ever growing quantity of resources from the State. Acting informally, competing clans will divide the central state’s offices and resources among themselves. The upshot is a regime that might best be called a clan hegemony. While such a regime will hardly be a democracy, neither will it be a classically authoritarian political order. Currently the clan-élites select the president, (the five States of Central Asia are all Presidential Republics), who must be an ombudsman for the clans’ interests. These clan-élites may be regional governors and kolkhoz (collective farm) chairmen, or simply village elders. Almost all of the powers are concentrated in the hands of the president or his entourage. In this way, through the presidential figure, the élite are able to control most of the natural resources and assets of the country and have the possibility to determine state policies.

Studies of post-Soviet transitions generally interpreted conflicts through the lens of ethnic and religious conflict.
