= Uznews.net =

Uzbek news website (2005–2014)

Uznews.net was an independent Uzbek news website that operated from 2005 to 2014. As of 2010, it had already been blocked by the Uzbek government for several years.

The website's editor-in-chief was Galima Bukharbaeva, an Uzbek journalist known for her eyewitness coverage of the 2005 Andijan massacre; she later won the International Press Freedom Award of the Committee to Protect Journalists.

Uznews.net reporter Salijon Abdurahmanov was arrested during a traffic stop on 7 June 2008, when police searched his car and stated that they had found 114 grams (4.0 oz) of marijuana and 5 grams (0.18 oz) of opium in his boot. Abdurahmanov stated that the drugs had been planted in retaliation for a story he had recently published on uznews.net about alleged corruption among traffic police. He was found guilty and sentenced to ten years in prison in October 2008. The conviction drew protests from a number of Western-based human rights organisations, including Amnesty International (which named him a prisoner of conscience), Human Rights Watch, the Committee to Protect Journalists, the International Federation for Human Rights, and the Organization for Security and Co-operation in Europe.

As of 20 December 2014, the news site had been shut down and all links redirected to the following message in Uzbek, Russian and English:

Uznews.net has ceased to exist.

We thank all our readers for having been with us and a separate thank you to the most faithful who are logging in now. We are touched.

Uznews.net Team (January 2005 – December 2014)

A tribute article by Reporters Without Borders stated that the email of editor-in-chief Galima Bukharbaeva had been hacked and that confidential information identifying independent journalists who had contributed to Uznews.net had been leaked to the public. Although all of the content has been removed from the site, it remains accessible via the Internet Archive.
