= Galima Bukharbaeva =

Uzbek journalist

- Born: 1974 (age 51–52); Tashkent, Uzbek SSR, Soviet Union
- Occupation: journalist
- Organization: Institute for War and Peace Reporting
- Known for: account of Andijan massacre
- Awards: International Press Freedom Award (2005)

Galima Bukharbaeva (Uzbek: Galima Buxarboyeva; born 7 July 1974, Tashkent) is an Uzbek journalist known for her reporting on state authoritarianism and for providing an eyewitness account of the 2005 Andijan massacre.

== Early career ==
Bukharbaeva began her career reporting for the France-based Agence France-Presse (AFP) and the London-based Institute for War and Peace Reporting (IWPR). Through these agencies, she covered topics including the repression of Islamic activists, police torture, and state‑sponsored harassment and violence against human rights activists and journalists.

Her reporting on these issues proved unwelcome to the Uzbek government, which soon attempted to restrict her ability to work. In 2002, the government refused to renew her accreditation with the IWPR, and in 2003 her AFP accreditation renewal was also refused. She nevertheless continued to work at the IWPR, becoming its country director for Uzbekistan. According to Bukharbaeva, the organisation's office remained under surveillance by an unmarked government car throughout most of 2004 and 2005.

== Andijan Massacre and aftermath ==
In May 2005, the city of Andijan saw several weeks of protests over the controversial trials of 23 businessmen accused of Islamic extremism. Following weeks of peaceful demonstrations, a group of masked gunmen attacked the jail where the men were being held on the night of 12 May, freeing them as well as protesters who had been arrested the day before. On 13 May, tens of thousands of protesters blockaded the roads, taking control of the city center. A small percentage of them were armed. Bukharbaeva spent the day reporting live from Bobur Square for CNN, BBC News, and other international agencies.

At 1800 local time, security forces massed for an assault, and soldiers began firing on the crowd of protesters from armored personnel carriers. Bukharbaeva later described the massacre in a story for the Committee to Protect Journalists:

Without warning, the soldiers opened fire into the crowd. Bodies fell like mown hay, row upon row. People in the center of the square ran in all directions, but soldiers had blocked off side streets. A helicopter clattered overhead, pointing out those trying to escape to the troops below. I don't know how I escaped. I just ran. "They think we are just dirt," a woman cried to me.

When Bukharbaeva reached safety, she discovered that a bullet had passed through her backpack, leaving a hole in her press card and her Che Guevara notebook.

Bukharbaeva subsequently conducted interviews with other eyewitnesses, who confirmed that soldiers were executing the injured who had been unable to flee the Square. The bodies of women and children were reportedly being removed from public view and concealed by authorities. The following morning, she attempted to return to the square with Reuters correspondent Shamil Baygin. However, they were intercepted by armed men who took them to the local police station. After two hours, Bukharbaeva and Baygin were released with an order to leave the city.

On 25 May, twelve days after the massacre, the government newspaper Pravda Vostoka accused Bukharbaeva and IWPR of instigating the Andijan violence. The article recommended that their pictures be shown on television "to warn citizens against them". Amnesty International subsequently issued an appeal on behalf of Bukharbaeva, Baygin, and numerous other journalists. In September, the government formally charged Bukharbaeva and other journalists who had reported on the massacre with providing "informational support to terrorism".

== Exile ==
Bukharbaeva then spent some time in Kyrgyzstan, first in a refugee camp and later in Bishkek, the capital of Kyrgyzstan, where she was received as a hero by the opposition community. However, she soon moved on to the US for fear that Uzbek security forces might attempt to kidnap her and return her to Uzbekistan for a show trial. She then received a Fulbright Award to pursue a Master's in journalism at the Columbia University Graduate School of Journalism. While in the US, she also testified before the Helsinki Commission of the US Congress about her experiences on the day of the massacre. In 2008, three years after Andijan, she wrote an editorial in the New York Times accusing Western nations of having already forgotten the massacre by beginning to normalize relations with Uzbekistan.

Bukharbaeva worked as the editor-in-chief for the Uzbek news website uznews.net. The website was blocked within Uzbekistan by state authorities for several years. In 2014, Bukharbaeva's personal email account was hacked and names of her contributors from Uzbekistan were revealed. That forced her to close the website down. In 2016, she started a new regional news service Centre1.com.

In 2007, Bukharbaeva served as a founder and chairwoman of the Real Union of Journalists of Uzbekistan.

== Support for Russia’s Invasion of Ukraine ==
Between February and April 2022, Bukharbaeva published a series of articles on Centre1.com that echoed Russian state narratives about the war in Ukraine. These texts described the invasion as a necessary mission against “Nazism,” called for closer alignment between Uzbekistan and Russia, and urged Uzbek citizens to support the Russian war effort. One article, signed by a movement founded by Bukharbaeva, praised Lenin and Stalin and encouraged “the strongest and bravest” Uzbekistanis to volunteer for combat, while others should organize rallies and humanitarian aid.

In another article, Bukharbaeva compared the 2005 Andijan massacre to the atrocities in Bucha, Ukraine, questioning the credibility of Ukrainian victims and portraying Andijan as the “real massacre.”

She also praised Chechen units fighting for Russia, and lauded a pro-Soviet symbol — an elderly woman waving the USSR flag in occupied Ukraine — as a representation of the “liberation.”

A 2025 independent investigation published by Yep.uz analyzed this ideological shift, concluding that Bukharbaeva and her website Centre1 had become conduits for Russian war rhetoric.

== Recognition ==
In 2005, Bukharbaeva won the International Press Freedom Award of the Committee to Protect Journalists. The award citation recognized the dangers she faced in her reporting and stated that she had earned "a reputation as one of Central Asia's most outspoken journalists". In 2011, Newsweek recognized her as "one of ten female journalists that risked their lives" in pursuit of a story, stating that "her reporting on Uzbekistan's authoritarianism led to her being denounced as a traitor".

== Personal life ==
Bukharbaeva is married to a German journalist, Marcus Bensmann, who works for the Swiss daily newspaper Neue Zurcher Zeitung. Bensmann, Bukharbaeva's boyfriend at the time, was also present at the Andijan massacre and was also subsequently labeled a terrorist by the Uzbek government. They currently live in Düsseldorf, Germany.
