= Ikhtiyor Abdullayev =

Uzbeki politician

- Ixtiyor Baxtiyorovich Abdullayev; Ихтиёр Бахтиёрович Абдуллаев
- Born: May 22, 1966 (age 60); Uchko‘prik District, Fergana Region, Uzbek SSR, USSR
- Military career
- Allegiance: Soviet Union; Uzbekistan
- Branch: National Security Service
- Service years: 1988–present
- Rank: Lieutenant general
- Commands: National Security Service

Lieutenant general Ikhtiyor Abdullayev (Uzbek: Ixtiyor Baxtiyorovich Abdullayev, Russian: Ихтиёр Бахтиёрович Абдуллаев; born May 22, 1966) is the head of the National Security Service of Uzbekistan, appointed by President Shavkat Mirziyoyev to replace Rustam Inoyatov in January 2018. He was fired from this post in February 2019 amid allegations that he tapped President Shavkat Mirziyoyev's phone. Abdullayev had previously served as the prosecutor-general of Uzbekistan, since 2015. He previously served as a Presidential advisor, before replacing Rashid Qodirov as prosecutor general.

== Early life and career ==
He was born on May 22, 1966, in the Uchko‘prik District of the Fergana Region of the Uzbek SSR. He graduated from Perm State University, receiving a degree in law. In the late 1980s and early 1990s, he worked in various justice departments in Fergana, acting as the a judicial executive for the Fergana City Court at one point. In 2000, he was appointed Chairman of the Andijan Regional Court, a position he served in until 2001, when was appointed as a deputy state advisor to the president for the coordination of law enforcement and control bodies. In 2009, he became State Advisor to the President of Uzbekistan. On January 22, 2010, by decree of the President of Uzbekistan, he was appointed a member of the Senate of Oliy Majlis of the second convocation. On April 21, 2015, Abdullaev took the office of Prosecutor General of the Republic of Uzbekistan. On January 31, 2018, he was appointed chairman National Security Service a position he would hold for a year until he was dismissed by President Shavkat Mirziyoyev.

On February 11, 2019, Ikhtiyor Abdullayev left the post of chairman of the National Security Service of his own free will due to deteriorating health (being at the head of the department, he underwent two complex surgical operations on the cervical and lumbar spine, as well as eye surgery).
