= Ruslan Mirzayev (general) =

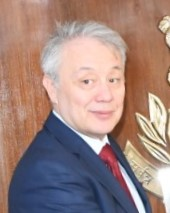
- Born: 21 February 1965 (age 61); Tashkent, Uzbek SSR, Soviet Union
- Allegiance: Soviet Union; Uzbekistan
- Rank: Major General

Ruslan Erkinovich Mirzayev is an Uzbek military figure and government official who served as Minister of Defense from 2005 to 2008.

== Biography ==
He was born on February 21, 1965, in Tashkent. In 1982, he joined the KGB. In 1986, he graduated from the Higher Military-Political Border School of the Committee for KGB, and in 1989, he graduated from the Higher School of the KGB. From 1986 to 1992, he served in the operational units of the Soviet Border Troops. From 1992 to 1999, he served in the Surxondaryo Region. From 1999 to 2002, he served as head of the department and then Head of the Main Intelligence Directorate of the Joint Staff of the Armed Forces of Uzbekistan.

From 20 August 2002 to 2005, he served as Secretary of the National Security Council under the President of Uzbekistan. He then succeed Kadyr Gulyamov on 18 November 2005 as Minister of Defense. He served until 17 September 2008, when President Islam Karimov replace him with Qobul Berdiyev. He was later appointed as Commander of the Border Troops of the State Security Service. He was removed from this position on July 18, 2012. From 2012 to 2018, he held leadership positions in the units of the National Security Service. In 2018, he returned to the post of Deputy Chairman of the State Security Service and Commander of the Border Troops. After retiring from government in 2020, he became Chief Consultant of the Secretariat of the National Security Council. Since January 1, 2022, he has served as director of the executive committee of the Regional Anti-Terrorism Structure of the Shanghai Cooperation Organization.

== Awards ==
- Shon-Sharaf Order 1st, 2nd degree
- Medal of Valor
