= Adham Ahmedbaev =

Uzbek politician

Adham Ahmedbaev Uzbek: Ахмедбаев Адхам Акрамович

3rd Minister of Internal Affairs of Uzbekistan
- In office 13 December 2013 – 4 January 2017
- President: Islam Karimov; Shavkat Mirziyoyev
- Preceded by: Bahodir Matlyubov
- Succeeded by: Abdusalom Azizov

Personal details
- Born: 14 February 1966 (age 60) Tashkent, Uzbek SSR, Soviet Union

Military service
- Branch/service: Armed Forces of the Republic of Uzbekistan
- Rank: Lieutenant General

Lieutenant General Adham Akromovich Ahmedboyev (Uzbek Cyrillic: Адҳам Акромович Аҳмадбоев, Russian: Адхам Акрамович Ахмедбаев; born 14 February 1966) is an Uzbek politician who has been Uzbekistan's Minister of Internal Affairs from 2013 till 2017. Now he is the State Advisor of the President of Uzbekistan.

Born in Tashkent in 1966, Ahmedbaev studied at Tashkent State University and earned an economics degree in 1988. From 1990 to 2000 he worked in the Department of Internal Affairs of Tashkent region. He was deputy head of the department from 2000 to 2004. From 2004 to 2006 he worked in the Office of the President of Uzbekistan. In 2006 he was named Deputy Minister of Internal Affairs of Uzbekistan on Finance, serving until 2011. From June 2011 to December 2013 Ahmedbaev was First Deputy Minister of Internal Affairs of Uzbekistan.

On 13 December 2013 President Islam Karimov appointed Ahmedbaev to be the chief of the Interior Ministry of Uzbekistan. The relevant Decree UP-4585 was signed by Karimov. He assumed the position after Bahodir Matlyubov was dismissed as interior minister. Ahmedbaev's selection was seen as demonstrating the power of Rustam Inoyatov and the Tashkent clan, of which Ahmedbaev is a member. He was awarded the rank of lieutenant on 22 August 2014.

On 4 January 2017 President Shavkat Mirziyoyev appointed him to be the State Advisor of the President. On 1 March 2017 he was dismissed from the post of State Advisor of the President for health reasons, then continued to serve at the Academy of the Ministry of Internal Affairs of Uzbekistan until November 2017.
