= Abdusalom Azizov =

Uzbek military leader

Lieutenant General Abdusalom Azizov
- Абдусалом Абдумавлонович Азизов
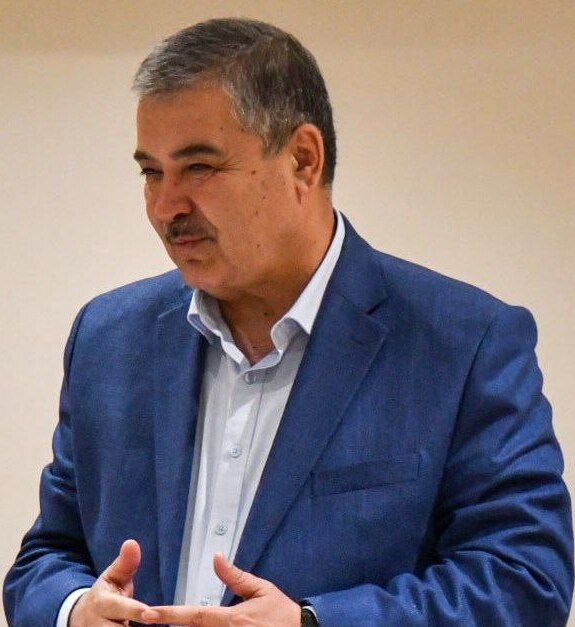
- Born: 20 January 1960 (age 66); Tashkent, Uzbek SSR, Soviet Union
- Military career
- Allegiance: USSR; Uzbekistan
- Branch: Militsiya; Armed Forces of the Republic of Uzbekistan
- Service years: 1982–2024
- Rank: Lieutenant General
- Commands: Ministry of Internal Affairs (2017); Ministry of Defense (2017–2019); State Security Service (2019–2024)
- Awards: Order "Mehnat Shuhrati"

Abdusalom Abdumavlonovich Azizov (Uzbek: Abdusalom Abdumavlonovich Azizov; born 20 January 1960) is an Uzbek military leader who was the Minister of Defence of Uzbekistan from 4 September 2017 to 11 February 2019. He served as head of the State Security Service from 2019–2024.

== Early life and career ==
Azizov was born on 20 January 1960 in Tashkent. He formerly served in the ranks of the Soviet Army. He graduated from the Tashkent Police School (now the Academy of the Ministry of Internal Affairs of Uzbekistan). From 1982 to 2001, he served in the Main Department of Internal Affairs of the city of Tashkent from the inspector of the checkpoint to the first deputy chief of the GUVD. In 2001-2002, he was the head of the Central Internal Affairs Directorate of the city of Tashkent. From 2002 to 2006, he was chairman of the national holding company Uzbekneftegaz. From September 2006 to November 2008, Azizov was the General Director of Uzneftprodukt (a subsidiary of Uzbekneftegaz). In November 2008 he returned to work at the Ministry of Internal Affairs and in the winter of the same year he served as Deputy Minister of Internal Affairs Bakhodyr Matlyubov, from December 2008 to December 2009 he was First Deputy Minister of Internal Affairs of the Republic of Uzbekistan Bakhodyr Matlyubov. From 2008 to 2009, he was simultaneously one of the vice presidents of the Uzbekistan Football Association. In 2009-2017 he was the head of the Internal Affairs Directorate in the Jizzakh region.

== Minister ==
After the death of former President of Uzbekistan Islam Karimov and Shavkat Mirziyoyev coming to power in his place, on 4 January 2017, Azizov was appointed Minister of Internal Affairs instead of Adham Ahmedbaev. 10 days after being appointed Minister of the Interior, he was awarded the title of Major General. As the Minister of Internal Affairs, Azizov participated in a radical reform of the Ministry of Internal Affairs of Uzbekistan towards transparency and openness, abolished the term "police" and established the phrase "Internal Affairs Bodies of the Republic of Uzbekistan" instead.

On 4 September 2017, Azizov was relieved of his post as Minister of Internal Affairs and appointed by President Mirziyoyev as Minister of Defense to replace Qobul Berdiyev. In January 2019, Azizov was awarded the rank of Lieutenant General.

== Security Service ==
On 11 February he was relieved of his post of Minister of Defense and appointed chairman of the State Security Service instead of Ihtiyor Abdullayev. On November 23, 2024, he was dismissed from the post of Chairman of the State Security Service in connection with the assassination attempt on Komil Allamjonov. On the same day, he was transferred to the Secretariat of the National Security Council under the President of Uzbekistan. On December 4, he was appointed to the post of Deputy Advisor on Socio-Political, Religious, Educational and Youth Issues to the President of Uzbekistan on Youth Issues.

== Personal life ==
Has two daughters and one son. The son is married to the daughter of the former Deputy Minister of the Ministry of Internal Affairs. Since 15 July 2019 he also became the president of the Football Association of Uzbekistan and promised to destroy contractual matches and corruption in Uzbek football.
