= Jizzakh clan =

Jizzakh

Profile
- Country: Uzbekistan
- Region: Jizzakh

Chief
- Abdulaziz Kamilov
Allied clans
Samarqand

The Jizzakh clan is a political clan based in Jizzakh Province, Uzbekistan and allied with the Samarqand clan. It is led by Abdulaziz Kamilov, former Uzbek President Islam Karimov's presidential advisor and current Foreign Minister.

== See also ==
- Clans in Central Asia
- Tashkent clan
- Samarkand clan
