= Bobo Makhamov =

Tajikistani politician

General Bobo Mahkamov (Russian: Бобо Махкамов; 1919 in Kokand – 1986 in Dushanbe), was a Soviet/Tajik who was Minister of Internal Affairs of the Tajik SSR from 1954 to 1972.

He was born in Kokand, a city in what is now Uzbekistan in 1919 when it was in the Russian Empire. Despite his birthplace, he was raised in an ethnically Tajik family. He attended the Konibodom School late in his youth, graduating in 1939. That same year, he joined the Soviet Army at age 20, enrolling in the NKVD School (now the Academy of the Ministry of Internal Affairs of Uzbekistan) in Tashkent. From September 1940 to September 1941, he was the acting representative of the NKVD Board of the Kulabski District, which was the first time he served in public office. By December 1953, he had been a Lieutenant Colonel of State Security, acting as the head of the Board of the MVD of the Leninabad Oblast until 1954. From April 17, 1954 to November 26, 1972, he was the Interior Minister of the Tajik SSR, promoted to the rank of Colonel and General of Internal Service while serving in this position. He retired from the armed forces in January 1973 and died in the Tajik capital of Dushanbe in 1986, aged 67.

== Awards ==
- Order of the Red Banner (August 31, 1971)
- Order of the Red Banner of Labour (three times)
- Order of the Red Star (November 5, 1954)
- Order of the Badge of Honour
