= Qobul Berdiyev =

Uzbekistani officer

Qobul Berdiev
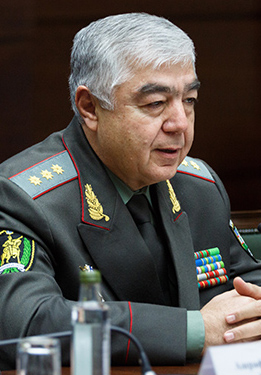

Minister of Defense
- In office 17 September 2008 – 4 September 2017
- President: Islam Karimov; Shavkat Mirziyoyev
- Preceded by: Ruslan Mirzaev
- Succeeded by: Abdusalom Azizov

Minister of Emergency Situations
- In office 14 March 2003 – 17 September 2008
- President: Islam Karimov
- Preceded by: Bakhtiyar Subanov
- Succeeded by: Qosimali Ahmedov

Personal details
- Born: 5 April 1955 (age 71) Akkurgan District, Uzbek SSR, Soviet Union

Military service
- Allegiance: Soviet Union; Uzbekistan
- Rank: Colonel General

Qobul Raimovich Berdiev (Russian: Кабул Раимович Бердиев, Uzbek: Qobul Rayimovich Berdiyev (born April 5, 1955) is an Uzbek military officer who has served as Minister of Defence of Uzbekistan from September 17, 2008, to September 4, 2017. He holds the rank of Colonel General.

== Biography ==
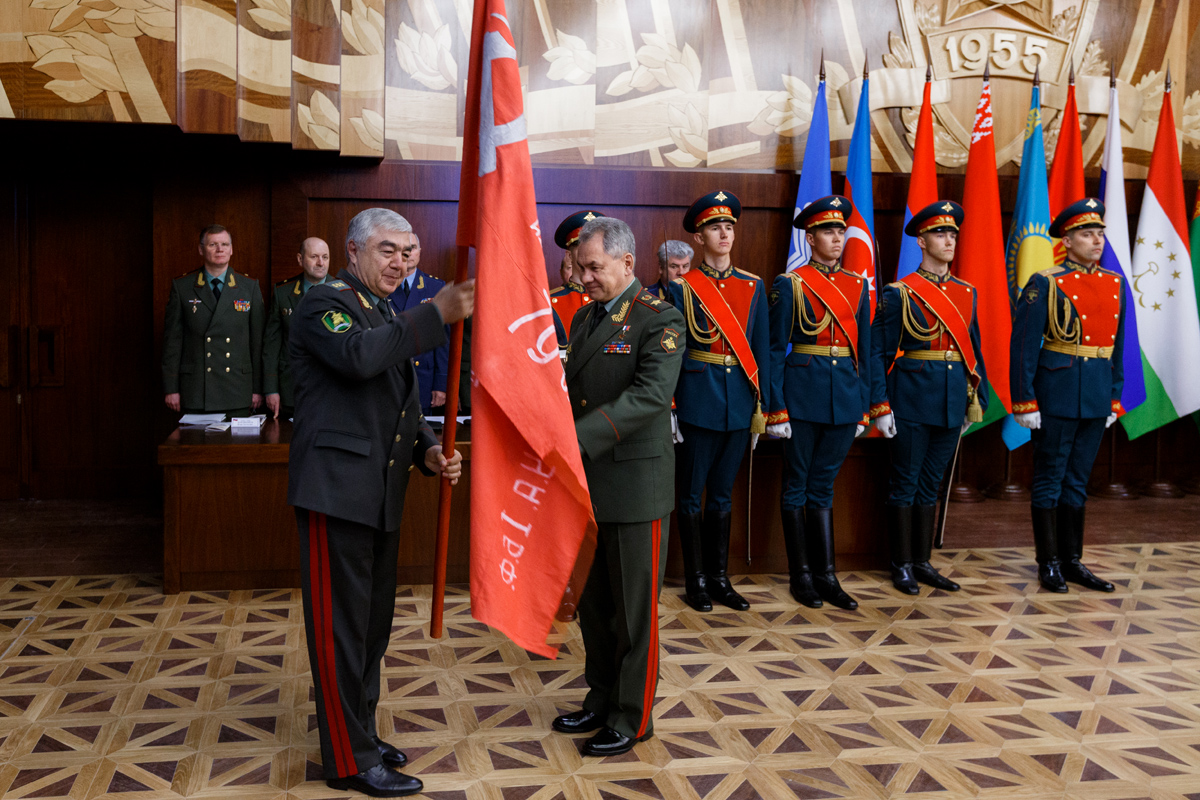
Berdiyev being handed the Victory Banner by Sergei Shoigu.

Kabul Berdyev was born on April 5, 1955, in the Kurgan district of Tashkent Region. In 1976, he graduated from the Tashkent Higher Military Command School, and in 1988 from the M. V. Frunze Military Academy. From 1976 to 1998 he served in various command and staff positions in the armed forces of the Soviet Union and Uzbekistan. In 2002, he began teaching at the higher academic courses of the Military Academy of the General Staff of the Armed Forces of Russia. In 1998–2000 he was deputy chief of the General Staff of the Armed Forces of Uzbekistan. In 2000 he was appointed deputy chief of the Joint Staff of the Armed Forces. In 2003–2006 he was head of the Tashkent Higher Combined-Arms Command School.

From 2006 to 2008 he was Minister of Emergency Situations. From June 2008 to September 2008 he was Deputy Minister of Defense and Commander of the Southwest Military District. By presidential decree on 17 September 2008, he was appointed Minister of Defence. He was dismissed on 4 September 2017 by President Shavkat Mirziyoyev and was transferred to the Academy of the Armed Forces of Uzbekistan of which he was rector for a year. On 1 May 2018, he was appointed head of the Civil Protection Institute of the Ministry of Emergencies.
