= Botir Parpiyev =

Uzbek politician

Chairman of the State Tax Committee of Uzbekistan
- In office 2004–2018
- Preceded by: Jamshid Sayfiddinov
- Succeeded by: Behzod Musayev

Personal details
- Born: December 23, 1946 (age 79) Andijan Region

Botir Parpiyev (Uzbek: Парпиев Ботир Рахматович, Parpiyev Botir Rahmatovich; born December 23, 1946, Andijan, Uzbek SSR) is an Uzbek lawyer and statesman, former chairman of the State Tax Committee of the Republic of Uzbekistan from 2004 to 2018, Lieutenant general.

== Early life and background ==
He was born in Andijan in the family of Rakhmat Parpiyev, a colonel of the militia, who in the 1960s worked in senior positions in the Department of Internal Affairs of the Andijan Regional Executive Committee. From 1970 till 1993 he served in various positions of the Department of Internal Affairs of Andijan Region.

== Career in Law Enforcement and Emergency Services ==
From 1994 to 2004 he was Deputy Minister of Internal Affairs, Minister of Emergency Situations and Chairman of the State Customs Committee of Uzbekistan. In 2003, he received the rank of Lieutenant General of the Customs Service.

== Head of State Tax Committee ==
From 2004 to 2018 he was a chairman of the State Tax Committee of Uzbekistan. Since 2009, he has also been the President of Uzbekistan Taekwondo Federation. Shavkat Mirziyoyev strongly criticized him for corruption in the tax system. Several high-ranking leaders in the system have been criminally prosecuted.

On May 11, 2018, Parpiyev left the post of head of the State tax committee and was appointed Deputy Chairman of the Republican Council for Coordinating the Activities of Citizens' Self-Government Bodies. On June 6, 2022, he was appointed as an adviser of Minister for Mahallah and Family Affairs of Uzbekistan. He was a deputy of the Supreme Soviet of the Uzbek SSR of the XII convocation, elected in the 1990 parliamentary elections.

== Awards ==
He was awarded the Certificate of Honor of the Republic of Uzbekistan, the orders of "El-yurt hurmati", "Shon-Sharaf", "Mehnat shuhrati".
