= Academy of the Ministry of Internal Affairs of Uzbekistan =

- O'zbekiston Respublikasi Ichki ishlar vazirligi akademiyasi
- Other name: Tashkent Police School
- Former name: Tashkent MVD High School
- Type: Police academy
- Established: 1938; 88 years ago
- Founder: Ministry of Internal Affairs of the Uzbek SSR
- Affiliations: Armed Forces of Uzbekistan
- Rector: Bakhodyr Matlyubov; Bakhodyr Rakhmanov
- Location: 68 Temur Malik Street, Tashkent, Uzbekistan; 41.32809°N 69.36158°E
- Language: Uzbek, Russian
- Website: http://akadmvd.uz/en/
- Phone Number: +998 71 265 22 52

The Academy of the Ministry of Internal Affairs of Uzbekistan (Uzbek: O'zbekiston Respublikasi Ichki ishlar vazirligi akademiyasi), also known as the Tashkent Police School (Uzbek: Toshkent politsiya maktabi) is the main educational institution of the Ministry of Internal Affairs of Uzbekistan. Its purpose is to prepare highly qualified officers for service in the interior ministry and the Armed Forces of the Republic of Uzbekistan.

== Overview ==
The Tashkent MVD High School was established in 1932. In 1958, a branch of the Distance Learning Faculty of the Higher School of the Ministry of Protection and Public Order of the RSFSR was opened in Tashkent. This move provided the basis for the school's intake of cadets, some of whom graduated in 1961. In September 1964, an evening school was opened for 50 internal affairs personnel from the Tashkent Garrison, who started to receive training. In accordance with the resolution of the Council of Ministers of the Uzbek SSR on October 23, 1967, a full-time department was established in the school. The Tashkent MVD High School was re-established as the Academy of the Ministry of Internal Affairs of the Republic of Uzbekistan on September 2, 1994. The academy is a specialized educational police institution, which carries out educational activities for the implementation of the rule of law in Uzbekistan. Most graduates of the academy work in the Ministry of Internal Affairs or in the armed forces.

== Academy Band ==
The Band of the Academy of the Ministry of Internal Affairs of Uzbekistan (Uzbek: O'zbekiston Respublikasi Ichki ishlar vazirligi akademiyasi orkestri) is an Uzbek musical ensemble that is linked to the Academy of the Interior Ministry. It was created in 1981 on the basis of a military band at the Tashkent MVD High School, with some cadets of the school joining the band immediately. The band began to support organized events that are facilitated by the band beginning in the 1982 academic year. In 1992, Lieutenant Khasan Nazarov took control of the band, being its first director following the Fall of the Soviet Union and the creation of the Republic of Uzbekistan. At the time, the MVD High School, which was later given its current name, replaced members of the staff with professional Uzbek musicians in 2004. Today, the band performs during the daily morning assembly for cadets, as well as taking part in all ceremonial events held at the academy, including oath-taking ceremonies, national military parades, local parades, and graduation ceremonies. The band regularly prepares and conducts concert programs on major Uzbek holidays, such as Defender of the Motherland Day (January 14), Victory Day (May 9), and Independence Day (September 1). Since 2014, the band has been under the leadership of Director of Music K. Alimov.

== Notable heads and alumni ==
- Adham Ahmedbaev (graduated in 2004), former interior minister of Uzbekistan
- Abdusalom Azizov (graduated in 1986), former defense minister of Uzbekistan
- Gheorghe Papuc (graduated in 1991), former Moldovan Ministry of the Interior
- Bakhodir Kurbanov (graduated in 1994), defense minister of Uzbekistan
- Ramazon Rahimov (graduated in 1994), Minister of Internal Affairs of Tajikistan
- Bobo Makhamov (graduated in 1940), former Minister of Internal Affairs of the Tajik SSR

== Rectors ==
The following officers have been in command of the school:

- T. Djalilov - (1964 - 1984)
- N. Ojiganov - (1984 - 1992)
- U. Tadjihanov - (1992 - 2004)
- K. Zakirov - (2004 - 2005)
- T. Mullajanov - (2006 - 2007)
- A. Yakubov - (2007 - 2010)
- S. Ikramov - (2011 - 2016)
- Bakhodyr Matlyubov (2016 – 2021)
- Rustam Khatamov (2021 - present)

== See also ==
- Ministry of Internal Affairs (Uzbekistan)
- Military academy
- Armed Forces of the Republic of Uzbekistan
