= Marcus Bensmann =

German journalist

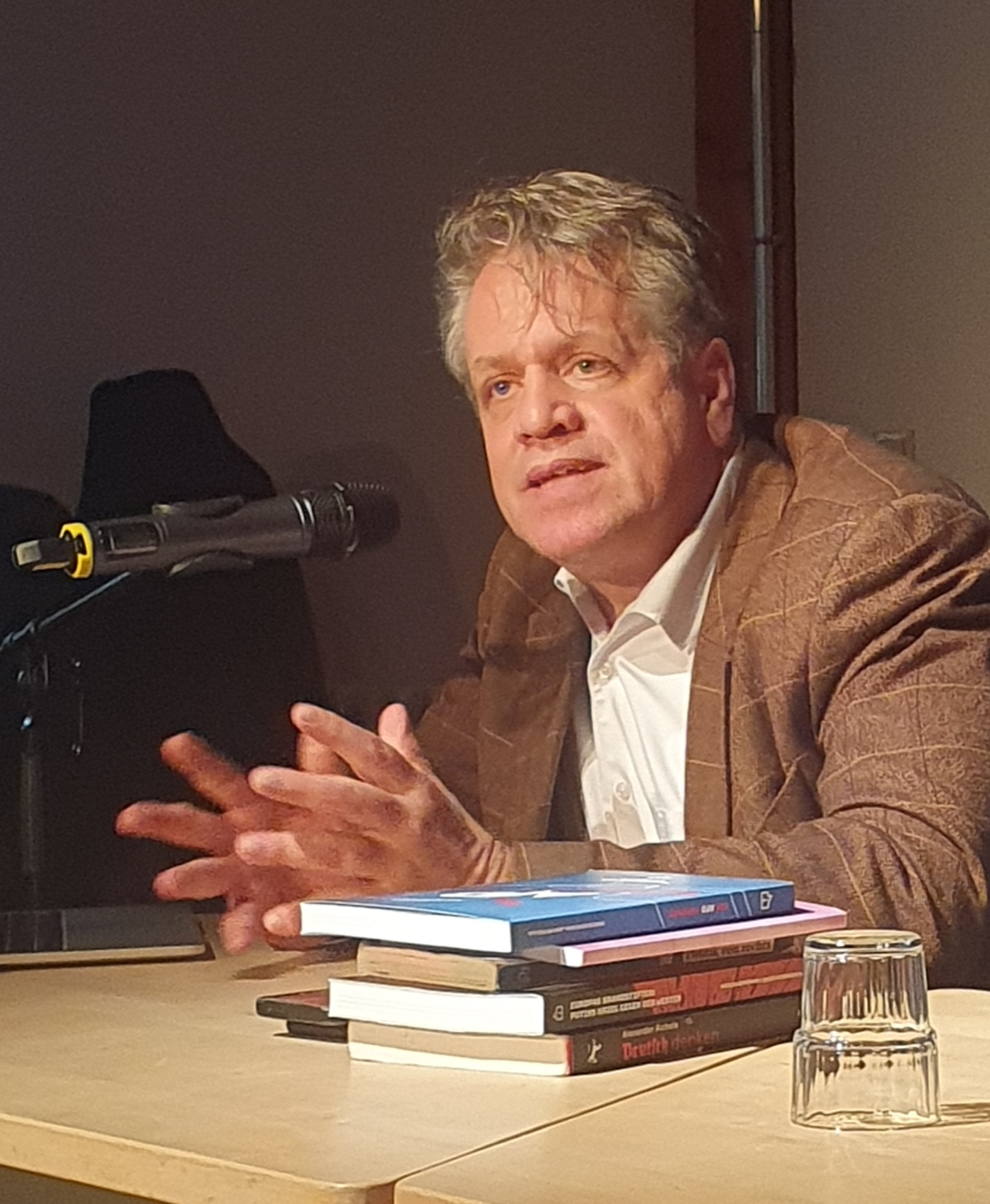
- Marcus Bensmann in 2024
- Occupation: Journalist
- Known for: Eyewitness coverage of the Andijan massacre
- Spouse: Galima Bukharbaeva

Marcus Bensmann is a German journalist noted for his eyewitness coverage of the 2005 Andijan massacre in Uzbekistan. For his coverage, he was subsequently charged with providing "informational support to terrorism" and forced to leave the country that had long been his primary "beat".

In 2008 Bensmann was staved in Kazakhstan. In 2014 he stated that he could prove Russian origination of the MH-17 shoot down.

Bensmann has worked for Deutsche Welle, the German TV channel ARD and the Swiss newspaper Neue Zürcher Zeitung. He is married to Uzbek International Press Freedom Award winner Galima Bukharbaeva, also a witness to the massacre.
