= Ministry of Emergency Situations (Uzbekistan) =

Government ministry of Uzbekistan

- Oʻzbekiston Respublikasi Favqulodda vaziyatlar vazirligi

Emergency service overview
- Formed: March 4, 1996; 30 years ago
- Jurisdiction: Government of Uzbekistan
- Headquarters: Kichik Khalka Yoli Street, Tashkent
- Motto: "Timely warn, save and help"
- Minister responsible: Azizbek Ikramov, Minister of Emergency Situations
- Website: www.fvv.uz

The Ministry of Emergency Situations (Uzbek: Oʻzbekiston Respublikasi Favqulodda vaziyatlar vazirligi; abbreviated MCHS) is the government agency overseeing emergency services in Uzbekistan. It is responsible for aiding the people of Uzbekistan and protecting them during natural disasters, overseeing emergency measures, and coordination of other ministries and departments in such events.

== Functions ==
The functions of the MCHS was laid out in a presidential decree dating back to March 4, 1996, which defines the following tasks of the ministry:

- The implementation of state policy in the sphere of emergency situations
- Management of the Civil Defense of the Republic of Uzbekistan
- Coordination of ministries/agencies across the country that specialize in the prevention and elimination of the fallout caused by accidents and natural disasters
- Targeted and scientifically targeted activities aimed at eliminating emergency situations, protecting the population and the territory of the country and enhancing the sustainability of publicly funded activities, as well as training the public, officials, and government agencies to prevent and respond to emergencies, organization and implementation of technical software development

== History ==
The Republican Center for the Training of Heads of Civil Defense and Emergency Situations was established in 1992 as an independent agency of the Government of Uzbekistan. It operated until 1996 when a decision made by Uzbek President Islam Karimov on August 16, 1995, on the establishment of a Ministry of Emergency Situations came into effect. Immediately after its founding, it began the work of coordinating the establishment of public emergency reserve funds for financial, medical, material and technical resources to overcome the consequences of events that might be considered national emergencies. In 2019, the Main Directorate of Fire Safety of the Ministry of Internal Affairs and the Service for Controlling the Impact on Hydrometeorological Processes of the Ministry of Defense were transferred to the MCHS.

== Subordinate Agencies ==
- Central Office
- Territorial Offices
- Structural Units
- Schools
  - Fire Safety Academy
  - Scientific Research Institute of Fire Safety and Emergency Situations
  - Center for Initial Training and Advanced Training of Firefighters and Rescuers
  - Specialized Lyceum for Preparing Youth
- Scientific and Technical Council
- Civil Defense
- State Emergency Management and Anti-Money Laundering System (FIEZ)
- National Center for Management and Response to Emergency Situations

== Ministers ==
No.	Image	Name	Term Start	Term End	President	Note
1		Ismail Jurabekov	1996	1997	Islam Karimov	
2		Rustam Akhmedov	September 29, 1997	2000	Islam Karimov	
3		Bakhodir Kosimov	February 11, 2001	March 4, 2002	Islam Karimov	
4		Ravshan Khaidarov	March 4, 2002	June 5, 2002	Islam Karimov	
5		Botir Parpiyev	June 5, 2002	December 2, 2002	Islam Karimov	
6		Bakhtiyar Subanov	February 26, 2003	February 5, 2006	Islam Karimov	
7		Qobul Berdiyev	February 5, 2006	January 4, 2008	Islam Karimov	
8		Qosimali Ahmedov	January 4, 2008	March 23, 2010	Islam Karimov	
9		Tursinhan Xudayberganov	March 23, 2010	December 26, 2016	Islam Karimov Shavkat Mirziyoyev	
10		Rustam Jo'rayev	2017	April 23, 2018	Shavkat Mirziyoyev	
11		Tursinhan Xudayberganov	April 23, 2018	March 1, 2022	Shavkat Mirziyoyev	
12		Abdulla Kuldashev	March 1, 2022	February 25, 2025	Shavkat Mirziyoyev	
13		Botir Kudratkhodzhaev	February 25, 2025	January 28, 2026	Shavkat Mirziyoyev	
14		Azizbek Ikramov	January 28, 2026	Present	Shavkat Mirziyoyev	
