= 2019–2020 Uzbekistan protests =

Protests in Uzbekistan

The 2019–2020 Uzbekistan protests were a series of spontaneous demonstrations and peaceful protest movements over social and political issues. Civil unrest has ravaged the country for a long time from July 2019, after a series of scandals and home demolitions caused severe anger. One reason for the massive demonstrations in the winter of 2019 was energy/fuel shortages in the region of Karakalpakstan. After a plan was set out to demolish illegal homes and mines in Tashkent, six days of protests unleashed.

== Background ==
Protests in Uzbekistan are a rare event given the country's authoritarian history. Uzbekistan's security forces under President Islam Karimov suppressed most public or digital expressions of discontent. After current President Shavkat Mirziyoyev began his tenure, careful digital protests directed against government officials and government policies began to emerge. Three years after Mirziyoyev took over, in the fall of 2019, small public protests are emerging. The majority of public protests so far have been tied to temperature drops. As the temperature dropped, so did the patience of people unable to satisfy their basic needs for electricity and natural gas. The protests have been isolated and uncoordinated, but in a way each small demonstration reinforces others. Their goals are the same: To attract the attention of officials.

== Wave of protests ==
Rare street protests began on 2–3 April 2019 when illegal houses were demolished, sparking anger. A wave of protests started on 26–30 July, protesting the treatment of poor people and the demolitions of mosques, homes and houses. Many say they've been treated like dogs. Hundreds demonstrated in the areas surrounding Tashkent. Mass protests were quashed by the security forces. One man said that "The police has treated us like dogs, The president is losing power".

Between 6–12 August 2020, a series of national protests in Tashkent was met with a police presence and scuffles. Mild protests were held nationwide in support of the protesters in Tashkent, protesting a new plan and bill set in place and demanding the resignation of president Shavkat Mirziyoyev. These protests ended with the scrapping of the plan on 12 August, when the protest movement ended.

On 28 November-14 December, a wave of protests struck Andijan, a city which experienced a national crisis, the 2005 Andijan unrest. Thousands of people attended a series of rallies in the eastern region. One was hurt when a tree was pulled down as a blockade to halt traffic. Agencies had been pulled in to quell the protests. President Shavkat Mirziyoyev called on protesters to stop and pause their demands for a non-authoritarian government and democracy, with justice and an end to shortages.

== See also ==
- 2005 Andijan unrest
