= Salijon Abdurahmanov =

Uzbek journalist (born 1950)

- Born: 28 May 1950; Nukus, Karakalpak ASSR, Uzbek SSR, Soviet Union
- Died: 26 July 2025 (aged 75); Germany
- Occupation: Journalist
- Known for: 2008 conviction for drug possession

Salijon Abdurahmanov (Uzbek: Solijon Abdurahmonov; 28 May 1950 – 26 July 2025) was an Uzbek journalist who contributed to Radio Free Europe, Voice of America, and uznews.net. In October 2008, he was given a ten‑year prison sentence for marijuana and opium possession. He maintained his innocence, stating that the drugs had been planted by police officers. Several international human rights NGOs called for his release, including Amnesty International, which designated him a prisoner of conscience. In 2014, he was awarded the Johann Philipp Palm Prize for freedom of expression and the press. He was released from detention in October 2017.

== Career ==
Abdurahmanov worked as a correspondent for Radio Free Europe until 2005. He also contributed to the Institute for War and Peace Reporting. At the time of his arrest, he was a contributor to Voice of America's Uzbek service as well as to the independent news site uznews.net.

He was an activist for the independence of Karakalpakstan, a region of Uzbekistan bordering the Aral Sea.

Before his journalistic career, he taught Russian language and literature for 23 years in a village school in the Amu Darya district of Karakalpakstan.

== Arrest for drug possession ==
On 7 June 2008, Abdurahmanov was stopped by traffic police, who searched his car and claimed to have found 114 grams (4.0 oz) of marijuana and 5 grams (0.18 oz) of opium in the vehicle. Abdurahmanov stated that the drugs had been planted in retaliation for a story he had recently published about alleged corruption among traffic police. After blood tests found no narcotics in Abdurahmanov's system, the authorities increased the charge to possession with intent to sell. On 10 October 2008, he was found guilty by a district court and sentenced to ten years in prison. The sentence was upheld by the Karakalpak Supreme Court's Appeal Commission two days later.

His imprisonment was condemned by a number of international human rights NGOs, which alleged that his arrest was connected to his journalism and activism for the Karakalpak separatist movement. Amnesty International designated him a prisoner of conscience, "detained solely for carrying out his human rights activities and exercising his right to freedom of expression". Front Line stated that it was "deeply concerned" by the arrest, and the International Federation for Human Rights and World Organisation Against Torture issued a joint statement urging his release, calling his detention "arbitrary" and for the sole purpose of "sanctioning his human rights activities". The Committee to Protect Journalists called for Abdurahmanov's release and for the Uzbek government to be held accountable for his detention. The OSCE stated that the drug charges were "made‑up" and that Abdurahmanov's trial "did not stand the scrutiny of a fair procedure". Human Rights Watch called the conviction "an affront to human rights and free speech".

Jeff Gedmin, president of Abdurahmanov's former employer Radio Free Europe, also spoke against the arrest, stating: "If President Islam Karimov is eager to rehabilitate his country's reputation, he should stop treating free speech as a criminal offence and let Abdurahmanov and nearly 20 other journalists and human rights defenders out of prison immediately."

== "Imposter" incident ==
In late 2012, the International Committee of the Red Cross attempted unsuccessfully to meet with Abdurahmanov for several months. According to Abdurahmanov's son Davron, at one point prison authorities introduced another man claiming to be Abdurahmanov to ICRC inspectors. The ICRC inspectors had seen a photograph of the real Abdurahmanov and refused to believe the impostor.

== Release from prison ==
On 4 October 2017, Abdurahmanov was released after serving nine years and four months in prison. On his release, he thanked human rights organisations for their advocacy.

The UN Human Rights Council later ruled against Abdurahmanov's conviction and recommended that he be compensated for his arrest, unfair trial, and imprisonment. As a result, Abdurahmanov applied to the Supreme Court of Uzbekistan to have his conviction overturned. A half‑hour court hearing on 23 September 2019 refused the application. During the hearing, Abdurahmanov said he was continuing his human rights activities as deputy chairman of the Human Rights Committee of Uzbekistan and was working as a journalist. A few days later, on 27 September, Abdurahmanov was questioned by the Karakalpakstan public prosecutor about the posting of a video on YouTube and possible extortion. Abdurahmanov denied any involvement and claimed that the interrogation was intended "to teach me a lesson".

In May 2020, Abdurahmanov gave an interview to Amnesty International in which he discussed the strength he had drawn from international letters of support while he was in prison.

== Death ==
Abdurahmanov died in Germany on 26 July 2025, at the age of 75.
