= Samarkand clan =

Samarkand

Profile
- Country: Uzbekistan

Chief
- Ismoil Jurabekov
- Leader
Rival clans
Tashkent

The Samarkand klan (alternatively Samarqand) is an Uzbek clan led by Ismoil Jurabekov. The clan is one of two major clans in Uzbekistan; the other, its main rival, is the Tashkent clan. To a lesser extent, the Ferghana clan is also a rival. Former Uzbek President Islam Karimov and current President Shavkat Mirziyoyev come from the Samarkand clan.

== Background ==
In contemporary Uzbekistan, tribes no longer exist. Modern Uzbek clans either operate at the family level or at the national level. The term "clan" today usually refers to patronage networks created by marriage or friendship. Some prefer to call the groups "factions".

The government of Uzbekistan, since the fall of the Soviet Union, has attempted to deny the existence of clan politics.

== History ==
The Samarkand clan came to power in Uzbekistan in 1983 after it replaced the Ferghana clan.

Ismoil Jurabekov, the head of the Samarkand clan, is known as "the Gray Cardinal" because of his role in bringing Islam Karimov to power. However, by 1993, Karimov began to restrict the power of the Samarkand clan. Karimov's patronage of the Samarkand clan had been causing discontent among the other clans, and he wished to stop this resentment to prevent revolt.

In the following years, he continued to weaken the power of all clans in the country. Jurabekov became an adviser to Karimov, but was ousted in 2004 after criminal allegations were made against him, in a move thought to strengthen the rival Tashkent clan. Jurabekov had previously been one of the most powerful men in the country.

Interior Minister Zokir Almatov, from the Samarkand clan, also resigned in late 2005, citing poor health.

== See also ==
- Clans in Central Asia
- Tashkent clan
- Jizzakh clan

== Bibliography ==
- Collins, Kathleen (2006). Clan politics and regime transition in Central Asia. Cambridge University Press. p. 350. ISBN 978-0-521-83950-1.
- Roy, Olivier (2000). The New Central Asia: the creation of nations. I.B.Tauris. ISBN 978-1-86064-278-4.
- Sengupta, Anita (2003). The formation of the Uzbek nation-state: a study in transition. Lexington Books. ISBN 978-0-7391-0618-1.
