= Rustam Inoyatov =

Uzbek government official (born 1944)

- Born: 22 June 1944 (age 82); Shirabad, Surxondaryo Region, Uzbek SSR, USSR
- Military career
- Allegiance: Soviet Union; Uzbekistan
- Branch: KGB (1970–1991); National Security Service (1991–2018)
- Service years: 1970–2018
- Rank: Colonel general
- Commands: National Security Service

Rustam Rasulovich Inoyatov (Russian: Рустам Расулович Иноятов; born 22 June 1944) is a former Uzbek government official, as well as a colonel general. He was head of the National Security Service of Uzbekistan (SNB) from 1995 until his dismissal in January 2018. He was said to have been part of the Tashkent clan, a powerful faction within the Uzbek elite. He was said to be one of the most powerful men in the country.

== Biography ==
Rustam Rasulovich Inoyatov was born in the city of Sherabad, Surxondaryo Region. His father Rasul Inoyatov was a KGB colonel.

From 1965 to 1967 he was a concrete worker in the Tashkent Building Trust, at the same time he studied at the university. In 1968 he graduated from the Faculty of Iranian Philology of the Tashkent State University.

After graduation he served in the ranks of the Soviet army. During military service he was accepted into the service of the KGB of the USSR. Worked in various officer positions in the KGB of the Uzbek SSR, in The First Chief Directorate of the KGB.

In 1976–1981 he was a case officer in Afghanistan under diplomatic cover.

Since 27 June 1995 – Chair of the National Security Service of the Republic of Uzbekistan. Previously, he was First Deputy Chairman of the department.

In 1996 he was awarded the rank of "lieutenant general", in 1999 – "colonel general".

From 1999 to 2020 Inoyatov was the president of the Tennis Federation of Uzbekistan.

On 31 January 2018 Rustam Inoyatov was relieved of the post of Chairman of the National Security Service of the Republic of Uzbekistan and appointed to the position of State Advisor to the president of the Republic of Uzbekistan. On 15 November 2021 he was relieved of this position.

Rustam Inoyatov is considered one of the most influential people in Uzbekistan – the grise eminence of Uzbek politics.

== Rise to power ==
In 1995 the President of Uzbekistan, Islam Karimov, gave him the position of chief of the SNB as a counter weight to his rival's power, Zokir Almatov, the Minister of Internal Affairs. Under Inoyatov's leadership, the SNB rose to power over the rival MVD of Almatov. By 1999, they had more power and funding than the MVD.

He is widely thought to be the kingmaker when Islam Karimov died.

Inoyatov was dismissed by Shavkat Mirziyoyev on 31 January 2018. On 15 November 2021, he was relieved of his post as State Advisor to the president of the Republic of Uzbekistan.
