= Customs Service (Uzbekistan) =

The Customs Service (Uzbek: Bojxona xizmati) is the customs agency of Uzbekistan. It has been part of the National Security Service since being transferred to its control in 2005 with the Uzbekistan Frontier Service.

== Higher Customs Institute ==
The Higher Military Customs Institute (Uzbek: Oliy harbiy bojxona instituti) is an educational institution of the military that trains specialists in the customs system. It was established on 22 May 2002, on the basis of the Academy of the Customs Service of Uzbekistan. As the institute's basic training routine improved, links with similar educational departments of foreign countries grew. In its first year, 125 students were enrolled in the institute. It is located on 118 Gulkhani Street in Tashkent.
