= Tashkent clan =

Political clan in Tashkent, Uzbekistan

Tashkent

Profile
- Country: Uzbekistan
- Region: Tashkent

Chief
- Unknown
- Last Chief: Unknown
Rival clans
Samarkand clan

The Tashkent clan is a powerful political clan based in Tashkent, Uzbekistan that controls the Uzbek National Security Service (known as the SNB, or MHH), and since late 2005 the Interior Ministry. The Samarkand clan is its biggest rival for control over the Government of Uzbekistan.

Interior Minister Zokir Almatov, a member of the Samarkand clan, resigned in late 2005 saying his health prohibited him from continuing to serve. President Islam Karimov appointed the deputy director of the National Security Service, a member of the Tashkent clan, as his replacement. Analysts had previously suggested that the Interior Ministry, under Almatov's leadership, had organized the 1999 Tashkent bombings. Others have suggested the bombings were done by the SNB under the leadership of Rustam Inoyatov, who at the time led the Tashkent clan. Analysts suggested a series of bombings in 2004 in Tashkent and Bukhara may have been done by the SNB against the Interior Ministry.

== See also ==
- Clans in Central Asia
- Samarkand clan
- Jizzakh clan
