= Navoi Square =

Area of Andijan, Uzbekistan

Coordinates: 40°45′42.3″N 72°21′6.8″E

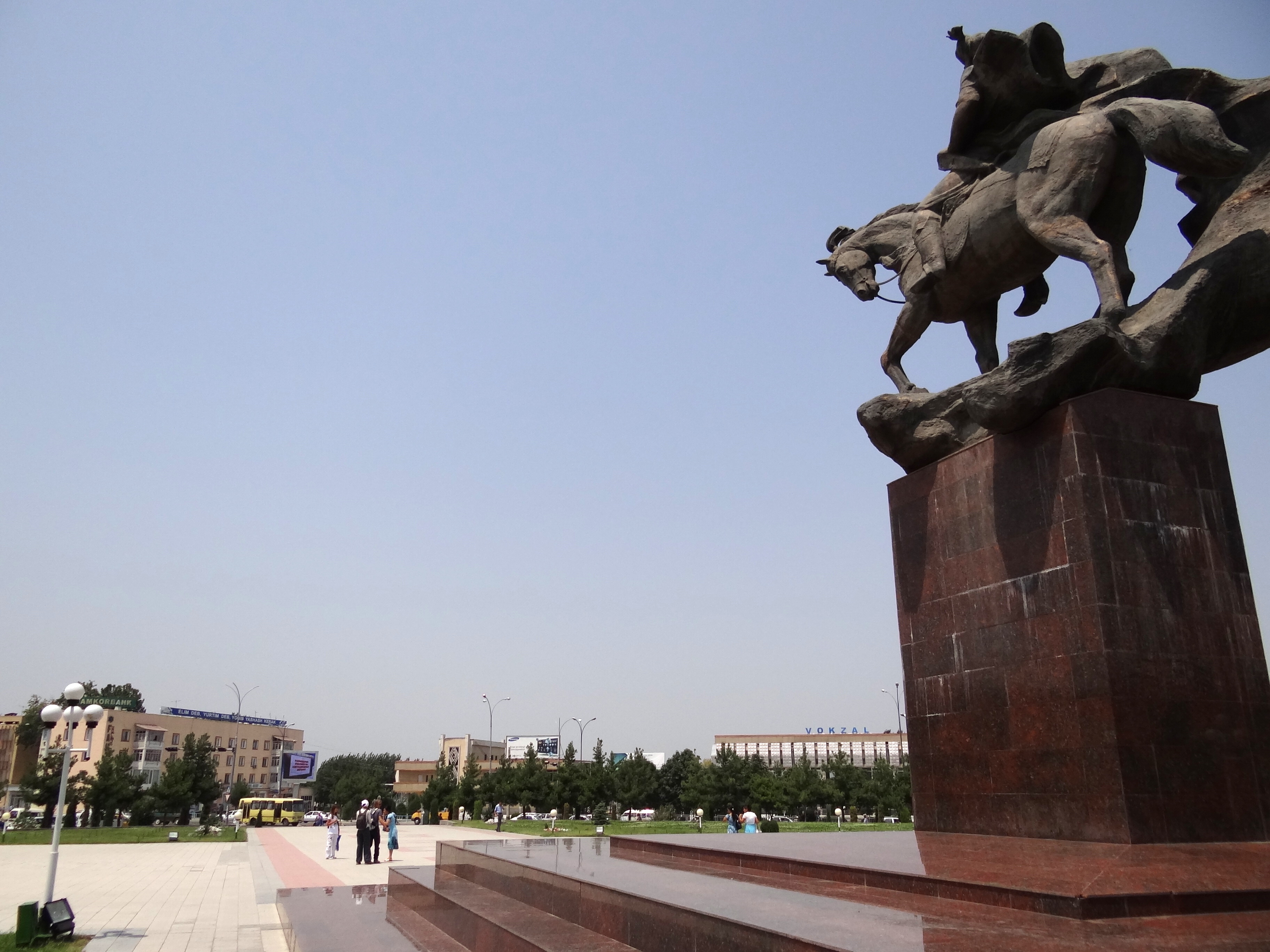
The square in 2012

Navoi Square (Uzbek: Navoiy maydoni) is an area in the city centre of Andijan, Uzbekistan. It was originally named Bobur Square, after Babur, the founder of the Mughal dynasty. On 13 May 2005, it was the site of the Andijan Massacre.

== History ==
The square is named after Alisher Navoi, a known poet in Uzbekistan from the Timurid Empire era. The square lies right next to Alisher Navoi park, an urban park with amusement rides, a stadium and a monument of Navoi. The park was reportedly opened in 1930.
Another notable feature of the square is a statue of Babur. In November 2024, a proposal to relocate the statue to the old city's Registon Square prompted public debate, however there are no reports that the statue was relocated.

On 12-13 May 2005, many protesters gathered in the square to voice their anger over poverty and governmental corruption. Government officials blocked the perimeters of the square, however riots continued to take place. Shooting incidents began in the morning of 13 May, and the situation escalated quickly into a wide massacre.
