= Border Troops of the State Security Service (Uzbekistan) =

Border guard of Uzbekistan

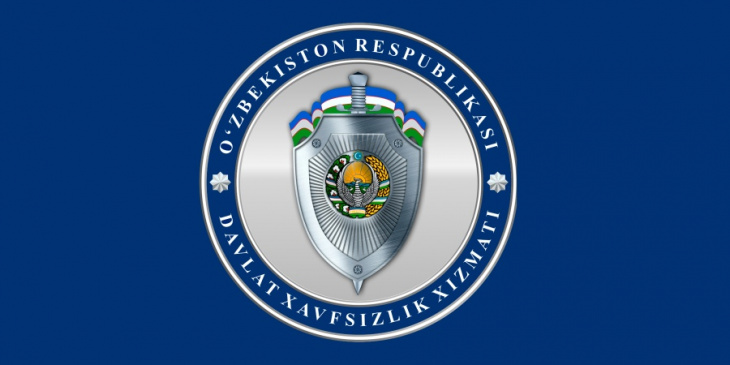
Flag of the State Security Service of Uzbekistan

The Border Troops of the State Security Service of Uzbekistan (Uzbek: Özbekiston Respublikasi Davlat xavfsizlik xizmati çegara qöşinlari) and commonly referred to as the Border Troops, is a department of the military and State Security Service of Uzbekistan responsible for border security, part of the Security Service since 2005.

== Structure ==
=== Navy ===
A small riverine naval force is operated by the Frontier Service on the Amu Darya river, with two Gurza-class gunboats in service as well as other small craft.

=== Civil Guard ===
In early 2021, the government ordered the creation of civilian border guard detachments to assist the border troops. It recruits citizens between the ages of 18 and 60 who live in village near the national border, and can work on a voluntary basis. The detachments aide in border surveillance and conducts night patrols.

== Operation ==
=== Border clashes ===
It has had many disagreements with the Frontier Forces of Kyrgyzstan since 2011.

=== COVID-19 ===
The Border Troops helped respond to the spread of the COVID-19 pandemic in Uzbekistan. It received personal protective equipment by the EU-funded BOMCA Programme, which included 15 000 facemasks.

== Commanders ==
No.	Image	Name	Term Start	Term End	President	Note
1		Major General Ilkhom Ismailovich Ibragimov	14 August 2004	?	Islam Karimov	
2		Major General Ruslan Mirzayev	17 September 2008	July 18, 2012	Islam Karimov	
3		Colonel Rustam Eminzhanov	July 18, 2012	April 2018	Islam Karimov Shavkat Mirziyoyev	
4		Major General Ruslan Mirzayev	April 2018	March 2020	Shavkat Mirziyoyev	
5		Major General Salimzhon Khusanov	March 2020	Present	Shavkat Mirziyoyev	
