= Ministry of Internal Affairs (Uzbekistan) =

Government ministry of Uzbekistan

Ministry of Internal Affairs of the Republic of Uzbekistan
- O'zbekiston Respublikasi Ichki Ishlar Vazirligi
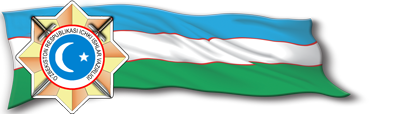
- Flag of Ministry of Internal Affairs

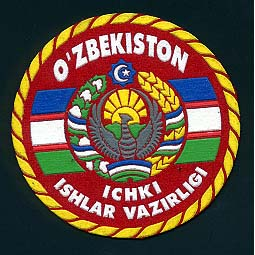
- Shoulder Patch of Ministry of Internal Affairs

Interior Ministry overview
- Formed: August 25, 1991
- Preceding Interior Ministry: Soviet Interior Ministry
- Jurisdiction: Government of Uzbekistan
- Headquarters: 1 Yunus Radzhabi Street, Tashkent
- Motto: "Kuch Adolatda" (Power in fairness)
- Employees: 80,000
- Minister responsible: Aziz Tashpulatov, Minister of Internal Affairs
- Child Interior Ministry: National Security Service (Uzbekistan) ∟ Customs Service (Uzbekistan) ∟ Frontier Service (Uzbekistan)
- Website: gov.uz/iiv

The Ministry of Internal Affairs of the Republic of Uzbekistan (Uzbek: O'zbekiston Respublikasi Ichki Ishlar Vazirligi; IIV), is a body of the Government of Uzbekistan that is charged with the internal affairs of Uzbekistan and oversees the national police. The Ministry of Internal Affairs was founded on 25 August 1991. It replaced the Soviet Interior Ministry. The current Minister of Internal Affairs is Aziz Tashpulatov. The ministry holds joint control over the Armed Forces of the Republic of Uzbekistan. It also administers the Academy of the Ministry of Internal Affairs, which is the official educational institution of the ministry.

== History ==
The ministry's predecessor was the People's Commissariat of Internal Affairs of the Turkestan ASSR, which was founded on June 26, 1919, on a charter for criminal investigation which was adopted in 1948. It evolved as the USSR and the region changed over time, eventually becoming a ministry which covered the citizens of the Uzbek Soviet Socialist Republic. On July 20, 1953, the Council of Ministers of the Uzbek SSR adopted a decree on "measures to strengthen the fight against crime and maintaining public order", which gave the ministry more flexibility to act independently from the Soviet ministry.

After the announcement of the Republic of Uzbekistan as an independent sovereign state in 1991, all law enforcement bodies were changed and or restructured, with the internal affairs ministry going through a series of changes. The modern activities of the ministry were adopted by President Islam Karimov on January 8, 1993, which stated that the main tasks of the ministry is to protect the integrity of the Constitution of Uzbekistan and ensure the protection and security of citizens as well as their rights and freedoms. This was expanded in March 2001 to include domestic terrorism and Islamic extremism.

== Departments and directly reporting units ==
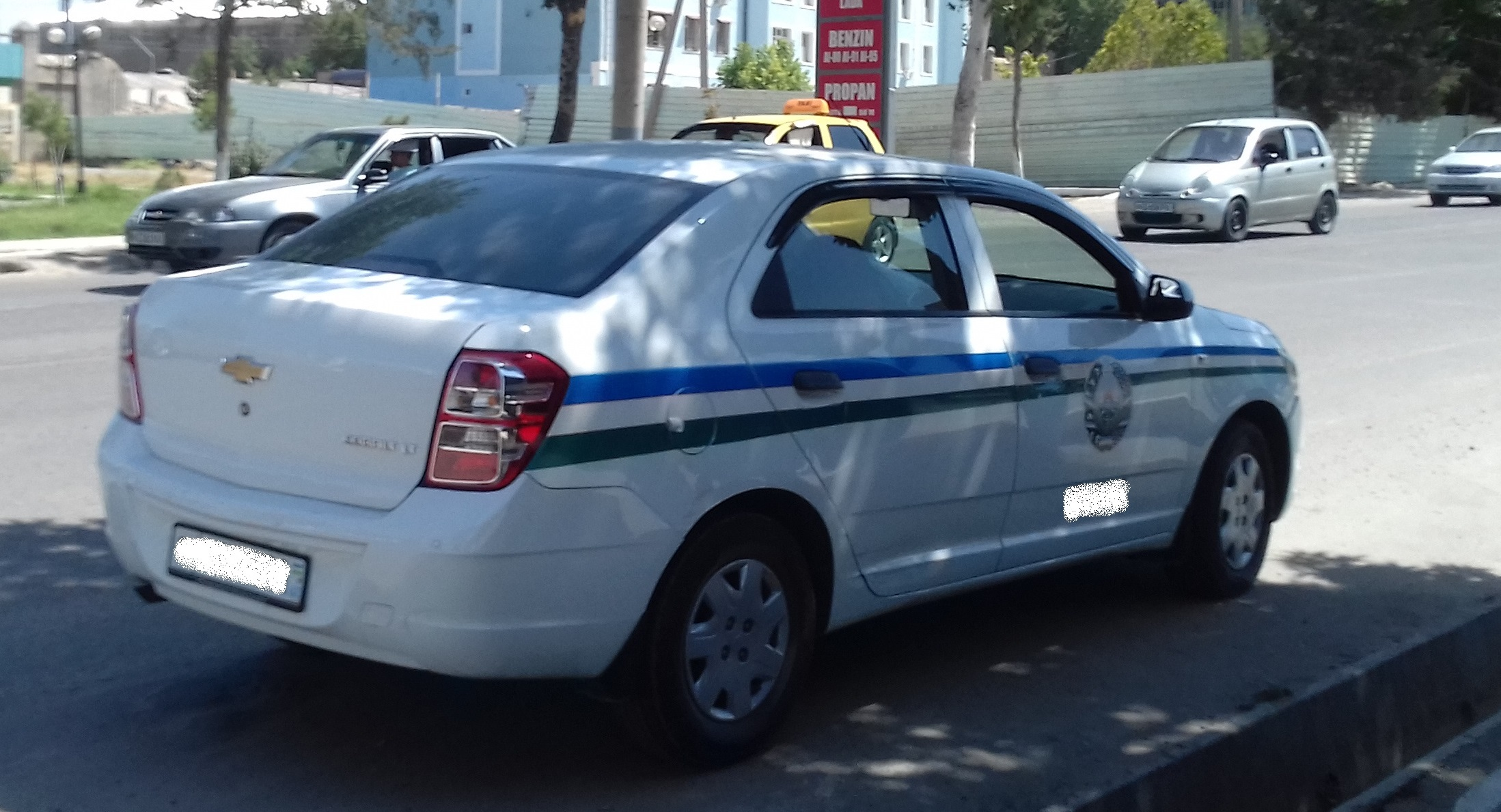
Chevrolet Cobalt Uzbekistan Police car.

Currently, the Ministry of Internal Affairs operates various independent units and departments:

- Internal Troops
- General Directorate of Criminal Investigation and Terrorism
- Central Investigation Office
- Department of Patrol and Protection of Public Order
- General Directorate of Criminal Prevention
- Road Safety Unit
- Republican Association "Protection"

=== Internal Troops ===
The Internal Troops (Uzbek: Ichki Qo'shinlari) are one of the many elite militarized forces in the armed forces. It is a gendarmerie-like paramilitary force that is affiliated to the military but maintains a separate chain of command. It provides specific protection from foreign threats and quells public unrest. In conducting its duties, it relies on a force of around 20,000 men. They also consist of mostly field units, which are the types found in prison security units, various units attached to a certain facility and special forces. The Internal Troops were formed in January 1992 on the basis of units of the Internal Troops of the Ministry of Internal Affairs of the Uzbek SSR.

Following the 2005 Andijan unrest, the SNB took control of the troops. In 2007, the Internal Troops were transferred to the structure of the Ministry of Defense. In May 2018, it was transferred from National Security Service (SNB) control to the interior ministry. They are commonly utilized against Islamic terrorists in the border regions near Tajikistan and Kyrgyzstan.

It maintains several Spetsnaz battalions:

It is composed of 5 brigades and the following action groups:

- Scorpion Group
- Bars
- Ts
- Alpha Group

== Symbols of Ministry of Internal Affairs ==
=== Flag ===
The flag of the Ministry of Internal Affairs consists of a dark gray banner, with the emblem of the interior ministry (drawn in a circle of 98 cm in diameter) in center of its front and back sides.

=== Emblem ===
The emblem of the interior ministry has a bronze ring with rounded edges of dark circles. In the center of the line is a red line representing vital force. In the top of the dash, the words in the section indicate the divergence, and the inscriptions are separated by two eight-pointed stars representing determination, courage, and glory. The circle is decorated with national ornament and represents a shield representing the protection against internal and external threats. It is an octogram that is centered on the circle in the center of the right turn, which means achieving order, balance, and maturation. Two swords - the ancient symbol of power and protection, crossed the back of the shield and crossed diagonally. Behind the shields and swords, a bird, made of gold, flared up, symbolized luck and happiness.

=== Band ===
The Exemplary Band of the MVD was founded on 10 January 1993, under the direction of Colonel Grigor Terzyan, an ethnic Armenian from the now Turkish city of Erzurum. He held that position until his death in late May 2009. Notable members of the band included Lieutenant Colonel Yunus Gulzarov. One of Colonel Terzyan's famous pieces, was the March of General Sirazhdinov, which is commonly used in the armed forces. In 2018, the band under the leadership of Captain M. Makhmudov performed on its silver jubilee at the Palace of Culture of the Ministry of Internal Affairs. In 2020, employees of the band, each being home in quarantine due to the COVID-19 pandemic, presented a musical composition through the Zoom videoconferencing software program.

== Subordinate educational institutions of the ministry ==
The following educational institutions operate under the IIV:

- Academy of the Ministry of Internal Affairs of Uzbekistan
- Academic Lyceums of the IIV
- Specialized Boarding School of the IIV
- Nukus Military-Academic Lyceum "Temurbek Military School" of the IIV

=== Academy ===
The Academy of the Ministry of Internal Affairs of Uzbekistan is the main educational institution of the Interior Ministry. It primarily has the purpose of grooming and training cadets to become enlisted officers who are ready for service in the interior ministry, as well as other law enforcement bodies in the armed forces.

=== Lyceums ===
In accordance with the decree of the President of the Republic of Uzbekistan "On measures to radically improve the system of training, retraining and advanced training of employees of internal affairs bodies" on 16 August 2017, 14 academic lyceums of the Ministry of Internal Affairs were created:

- Karakalpak Academic Lyceum (Nukus)
- Andijan Academic Lyceum (Andijan)
- Bukhara Academic Lyceum (Bukhara)
- Jizzakh Academic Lyceum (Jizzakh)
- Kashkadarya Academic Lyceum (Karshi)
- Navoi Academic Lyceum (Navoi)
- Namangan Academic Lyceum (Namangan)
- Samarkand Academic Lyceum (Samarkand)
- Syrdarya Academic Lyceum (Gulistan)
- Surkhandarya Academic Lyceum (Jarkurgan District)
- Tashkent Academic Lyceum No. 1 (Tashkent)
- Tashkent Academic Lyceum No. 2 (Qibray District)
- Fergana Academic Lyceum (Fergana)
- Khorezm Academic Lyceum (Urgench)

=== Special boarding school ===
In accordance with the resolution of the Cabinet of Ministers of the Republic of Uzbekistan "On measures to organize the activities of a specialized boarding school of the Ministry of Internal Affairs" on 19 June 2018, for the purpose of training and education, as well as social and legal assistance to children of employees of internal affairs bodies, a specialized boarding school of the Ministry of Internal Affairs was created in the Uchtepa district of Tashkent. Students of the boarding school are provided with food, clothing, footwear and other necessary items in accordance with established standards.

=== Nukus Military-Academic Lyceum ===
The Nukus Military-Academic Lyceum "Temurbek Military School" began operations in the 2020/2021 academic year. The term of study at is 2 years, the annual quota of each is 100 people. Graduates of school upon admission to higher military and specialized educational institutions in test tests conducted by the State Testing Center under the Cabinet of Ministers.

== Ministers ==
The post of Minister of Internal Affairs was created in September 1991 after the Soviet era ministry in the Uzbek SSR was dissolved. The following is a list of Interior Ministers of the Republic of Uzbekistan:

=== People's Commissars of Internal Affairs (1934–1945) ===
Name	Start year	End year
Naum Raiski	1934	1934
Lev Zalin	1934	1935
Nikolai Zagvozdin	1935	1937
Derenik Apresyan	1937	1938
Alexei Sadzhaya	1938	1941
Yuldash Babadzhanov	1941	1941
Amayak Kobulov	1941	1945

=== Minister of Internal Affairs (1945–1991) ===
Rank	Name	Start year	End year
Major General	Yuldash Babadzhanov	1945	1953
Major General	Alexei Byzov	1953	1954
Major General	Yuldash Babadzhanov	1954	1957
Colonel	Tazhitdin Dzhalilov	1957	1964
Lieutenant General	Heydar Yahyaev	1964	1979
Lieutenant General	Kudrat Ergashev	1979	1983
	Nimatzhan Ibragimov	1983	1985
	Uchkun Rakhimov	1985	1989
Major General	Vyacheslav Kamalov	1989	1991

=== Modern republic (since 1990) ===
Rank	Name	Start year	End year
Colonel General	Zokir Almatov	1990	2006
Lieutenant General	Bahodir Matlyubov	2006	2013
Colonel	Adham Ahmedbaev	2013	2017
Major General	Abdusalom Azizov	2017	2017
Colonel	Pulat Bobojonov	2017	2025
Lieutenant General	Aziz Tashpulatov	2025	Present

== See also ==
- Armed Forces of the Republic of Uzbekistan
- Academy of the Ministry of Internal Affairs of Uzbekistan
- National Security Service (Uzbekistan)
- Customs Service (Uzbekistan)
- Frontier Service (Uzbekistan)
- National Guard of Uzbekistan
- Ministry of Internal Affairs (Soviet Union)
