= Zokir Almatov =

Uzbek politician (born 1949)

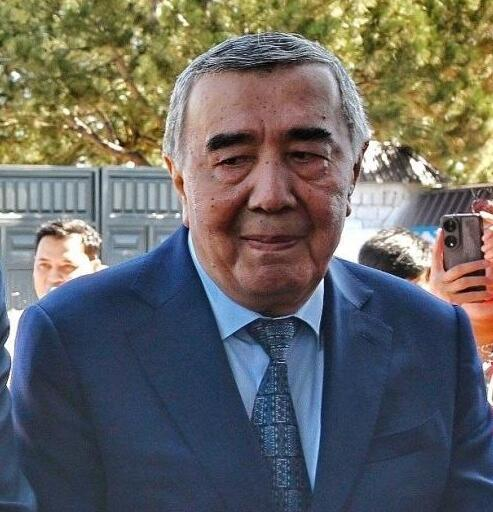
Almatov in 2026

Zokir Almatov (born 10 October 1949 in Zangiata, Tashkent Region, Uzbek SSR, Soviet Union), sometimes romanized Zakir, is an Uzbek politician who was the interior minister of Uzbekistan until 2005.

In 1967 he graduated from high school and immediately began to work at the Tashavtomash plant. He joined the Soviet Army in 1971, serving in the Internal Troops. In 1976 he graduated from Tashkent State University's Faculty of Law, which allowed him to work in district police departments around the country. From 1990 to 1991, he was Head of the Internal Affairs Directorate of the Tashkent Regional Executive Committee. On 16 September 1991, Almatov was appointed the first Minister of Internal Affairs of the Republic of Uzbekistan, succeeding his Soviet counterpart Vyacheslav Kamalov. He announced his retirement due to his poor health in 2005, and was officially dismissed in early 2006. In December 2016, he came out of retirement and came back into the political sphere, becoming the Chairman of the State Anti-Corruption Commission of Uzbekistan. Despite this, his appointment was not published and or confirmed by official documents. On 27 February 2018 Almatov was appointed special adviser to the Interior Minister of Uzbekistan.

Almatov was awarded with the Order of Outstanding Merit in 2021. Due to his involvement in the Andijan massacre, he has been banned from entering the European Union since 2005, alongside 11 other Uzbek officials.
