= State Security Service (Uzbekistan) =

National intelligence agency of the government of Uzbekistan

- Davlat Xavfsizlik Xizmati; Служба государственной безопасности
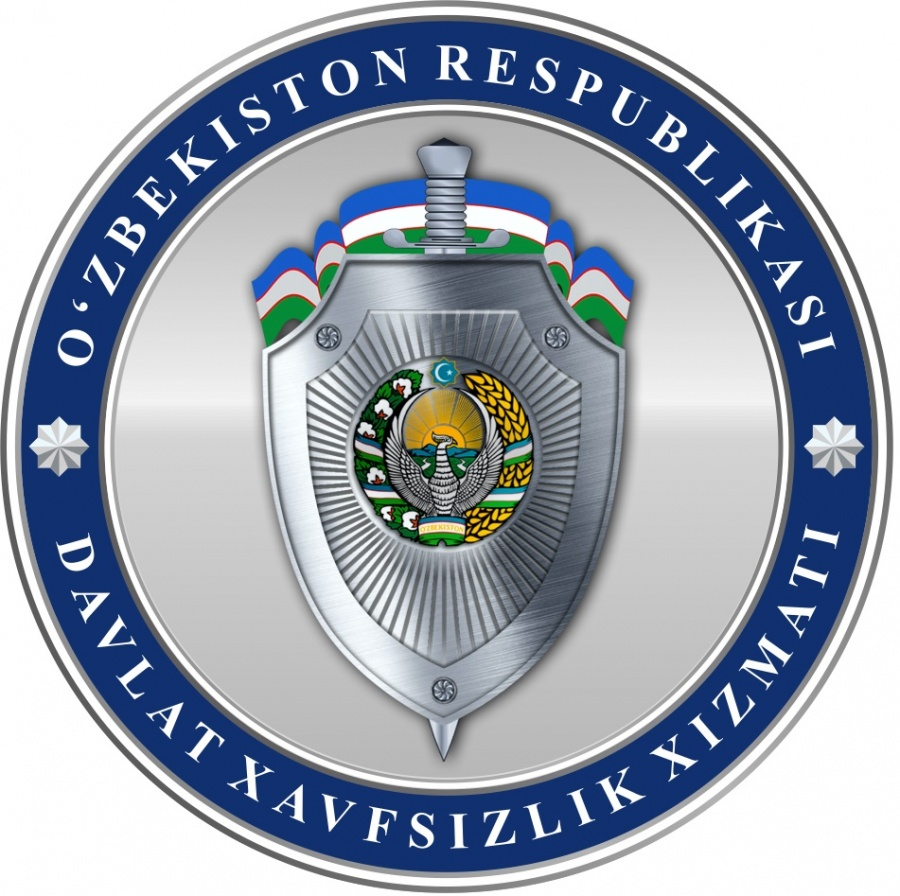

Agency overview
- Formed: 14 March 2018
- Preceding agency: KGB
- Type: Intelligence and security agency
- Jurisdiction: Uzbekistan
- Agency executive: Bakhodir Kurbanov
- Child agencies: Border Troops of the State Security Service; Uzbekistan Customs Service

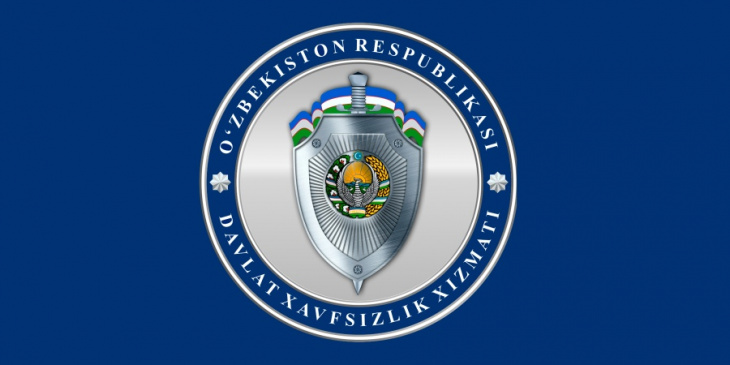
The flag of the SNB

The State Security Service (Uzbek: Davlat Xavfsizlik Xizmati, DXX often romanised as SGB) is the national civilian intelligence and security agency of the Republic of Uzbekistan. It was formerly known as the National Security Service.

The SNB is described by Amnesty International and the Institute for War and Peace Reporting (IWPR) as a secret police force.

The primary responsibilities are within the country and include analysis and development of intelligence collection and counterintelligence systems to create national security, border security, civilian intelligence cybersecurity, clandestine and covert operations, counterintelligence, counter-revolutionary, counterterrorism, creation a civilian security network intelligence, executive protection (especially the President of the Republic of Uzbekistan and Prime Minister of the Republic of Uzbekistan), intelligence gathering and assessment, internal security, investigation and interrogation some other types of serious crimes, maintain confidentiality of civilian intelligence information and documents, national's central intelligence affair for coordinating intelligence activities, psychological and information warfare, political warfare, support irregular warfare, surveillance and suppression of political activists, and threat assessment to national security.

== History ==
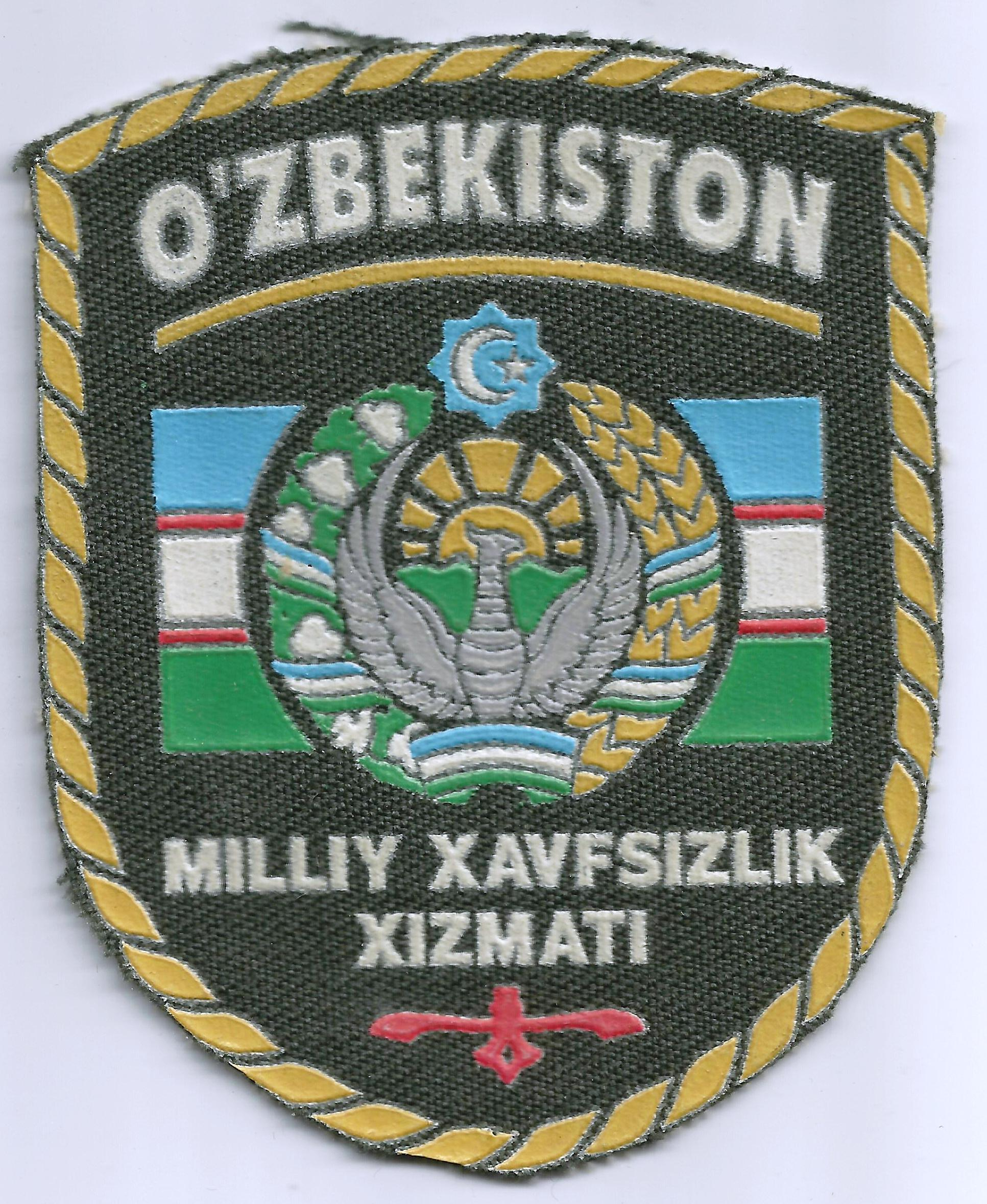
The logo of the SNB in use from 1992 - 2018

The SSS was created on 26 September 1991 as a successor to the Committee for State Security (KGB) and its republican affiliate in the Uzbek Soviet Socialist Republic (Uzbek SSR). Since the collapse of the Soviet Union, it has retained the same responsibilities and a similar range of functional units, including paramilitary police and spetsnaz. The SNB was a rival of the Ministry of Internal Affairs (IIV) until 2005, when it was brought under its control. It was renamed from the National Security Service on 14 March 2018.

In recent years, the SNB has been sidelined in favor of the Uzbekistan National Guard, which was largely seen as being loyal to former President Islam Karimov.

== Leadership ==
The following officials have led the SNB since its establishment:

- Rustam Inoyatov (27 June 1995 – 31 January 2018)
- Ikhtiyor Abdullayev (31 January 2018 – 11 February 2019)
- Abdusalom Azizov (11 February 2019 – 23 November 2024)
- Bakhodir Kurbanov (23 November 2024 – present)

Rustam Inoyatov was the head of the SNB for over 20 years beginning in 1995. The deputy director of the SNB was in 2005 appointed Minister of the Interior. A reorganisation of the security and counterterrorism agencies in the aftermath of the Andijan massacre significantly increased the power and resources of the SNB. In February 2019, the SNB head Ikhtiyor Abdullayev was fired after he was accused to have conducted surveillance on President Shavkat Mirziyoyev's personal phone.

Some analysts maintain that the SNB is under the control of the Tashkent clan, a powerful faction within the Uzbek elite.

The following people served as chairmen of the Uzbek KGB:

- Alexei Byzov (20 April 1954 – 11 February 1960)
- Georgy Naymushin (26 February 1960 – 14 December 1963)
- Sergey Kiselev (14 December 1963 – 25 October 1969)
- Alexey Beschastnovr (25 October 1969 – 25 October 1974)
- Eduard Nordman (25 October 1974 – 2 March 1978)
- Levon Melkumov (2 March 1978 – 24 August 1983)
- Vladimir Golovin (24 August 1983 – 27 January 1989)
- Anatoly Morgasov (23 February 1989 – 12 June 1991)
- Gulam Aliyev (12 June 1991 – 26 September 1991)

== Activities ==
The SNB has been closely associated with the authoritarian administration of President Islam Karimov, and has been accused of involvement in human rights abuses and in sponsoring acts of terrorism to provide a pretext for repressive policing. Radio Free Europe/Radio Liberty has reported claims that the 1999 Tashkent bombings were carried out by the SNB, then led by Rustam Inoyatov of the Tashkent clan, and that the SNB may also have been responsible for a series of bombings in 2004 in Tashkent and Bukhara.

Fear of the SNB is so widespread in Uzbekistan that it is considered dangerous to say its name in public. However, this situation is gradually changing at least on the surface.

=== Torture ===
The United States Department of State (DOS)'s 2004 Country Report on Human Rights Practices in Uzbekistan stated that SNB officials "tortured, beat, and harassed" citizens.

=== Andijan massacre ===
On 13 May 2005 SNB troops, along with military and Interior Ministry forces, killed a large number of protesters in Andijan, in an event that became known as the Andijan massacre. Estimates of those killed range widely, from the official figure of 187 to upwards of 1,000. The protests related to the arrest of a group of local businessmen, and the massacre was preceded by disorder including, according to Pravda, an attempt to seize the regional headquarters of the SNB.

=== Internet censorship ===
The OpenNet Initiative reports that the SNB is extensively involved in Internet censorship. The OpenNet Initiative reports that the SNB:

"monitors the Uzbek sector of the Internet and 'stimulates' Internet service providers (ISPs) and Internet cafés to practice self-censorship. Soviet-style censorship structures were replaced by 'monitoring sections' that work under SNB’s guidance. There is no mandatory government prepublication review, but ISPs risk having their licenses revoked if they post 'inappropriate' information. Occasionally, the SNB orders ISPs to block access to opposition or religious Web sites. A survey of internet filtering practices among Uzbek ISPs was conducted by ONI in January 2007. Respondents confirmed that they use filtering applications including SquidGuard and FortiGuard. The SNB's censorship is selective and often targets articles on government corruption, violations of human rights, and organized crime. Usually, it affects URL-specific pages instead of top-level domain names. Uzbek ISPs block entire Web sites or individual pages upon SNB's unofficial requests. Accessing a blocked page redirects the user to a search engine or to an error message such as 'You are not authorized to view this page.' The retransmission of blocked channels is also prohibited.

== Organization ==
The SNB is known to have spetsnaz groups "Alpha", "Cobra", "Ts" and "Scorpion" under its direct command. The Border Service and Customs Service of Uzbekistan answer to the SNB since being placed under its control in 2005. With corruption in the Country being the highest, the organization fully separated itself from the Nation but stays under mafia control. Its duties were recently laid out in a decree by President Mirziyoyev in January 2018.
