= Vladimir Makhmudov =

- Born: October 2, 1944; Samarkand, Uzbek Soviet Socialist Republic, Soviet Union
- Died: February 26, 2005 (aged 60) Tashkent, Uzbekistan
- Allegiance: Soviet Union; Uzbekistan
- Branch: Soviet Army; Uzbek Ground Forces
- Service years: 1963–2000
- Rank: Lieutenant general

Vladimir Nasyrovich Makhmudov (Uzbek: Vladimir Nosirovich Mahmudov; Russian: Владимир Насырович Махмудов; 2 October 1944 – 26 February 2005) was an Uzbek lieutenant general who served as the Chief of the General Staff of the Armed Forces of Uzbekistan.

== Early life and education ==
Makhmudov was born on 2 October 1944 in Samarkand, Uzbek SSR, into a prominent political and military family. His father, Nasyr Makhmudov, was a Soviet official who served as First Secretary of the Karakalpak Regional Committee of the Communist Party of Uzbekistan.

In 1963, Makhmudov joined the Soviet Armed Forces. He graduated from the Tashkent Higher Combined Arms Command School (TVOKU) in 1967, after which Makhmudov served as a cadet platoon commander until 1970, and subsequently as a cadet company commander at the school until 1975. He later completed his education at the Frunze Military Academy in Moscow, graduating in 1978.

In December 1979, he participated in the Soviet invasion of Afghanistan, serving as commander of the 181st Motorized Rifle Regiment of the 108th Motor Rifle Division until December 1981. He was the deputy commander of the 36th Army Corps of the Turkestan Military District in Ashgabat. From 1989 to 1992, he served as the Military Commissar of the Uzbek SSR. Following Uzbekistan's independence in 1991, he joined the newly established Armed Forces of Uzbekistan. From 1992 to January 1995, he served as Head of TVOKU, later the Academy of the Armed Forces where the served as its first rector from 1995 to 2000. During this period, he concurrently served as Chief of the General Staff of the Armed Forces under President Islam Karimov.

Makhmudov retired from military service in 2000.

== Personal life and family ==
Makhmudov died in Tashkent on 26 February 2005 at the age of 60. He was buried in Botkin Cemetery

His son, Viktor Makhmudov, followed him into military service, himself becoming a Chief of the General Staff and serving later as Secretary of the National Security Council under the President of Uzbekistan.

== Awards ==
- Order of the Badge of Honour;
- Order of the Red Star
- Shon-Sharaf Order
- Medal of Valor
