= Puli Hisar District =

Puli Hisar پل حصار Pul-e Ḩişār
- District
- Location within Afghanistan
- Coordinates: 35°31′56″N 69°25′41″E
- Country: Afghanistan
- Province: Baghlan
- Elevation: 3,392 m (11,129 ft)

Population (2012)
  - Total: 26,800

Puli Hisar or Pul-e-Hesar (Dari: پل حصار) is a district in Baghlan province, Afghanistan.

== History ==
It was created in 2005 from part of Andarab District.

The district was captured by the Taliban in the 2021 offensive in which they seized control of Afghanistan. However, in August 2021, the district was one of three districts in Baghlan province that were occupied by anti-Taliban fighters (remnants of the Afghan National Army and civilian resistance fighters), marking the first wave of armed resistance to the Taliban since they seized control over the country. The other areas in which the Taliban were ousted were Dih Salah and Bano.

On 23 August 2021, the Taliban once again captured all three districts that fell to the resistance forces a week ago, including Puli Hisar District. However, CNN reported on 31 August 2021 that resistance fighters had once again entered Puli Hisar.

== Geography ==
Puli Hisar District is bordered on the north by the districts of Dih Salah and Khost Wa Fereng, on the east by Panjshir Province, on the south by Panjshir and Parwan provinces, and on the west by Andarab District.

There are no towns in the district, nor any large-sized villages. Settlements include the small villages of Darae Su (Darah-ye Shū), Ahangaran, and Sar Ab.

The area is mountainous, lying within the Hindu Kush. Among its many mountains are Mount Larbach (Kōh-e Lārbāch) at 4,311 metres (14,144 ft), Mount Sare Surkhi (Kōh-e Sar-e Surkhī) at about 4,306 metres (14,127 ft), and on its southeastern border, Mount Shahak (Kuh-e Kokzaro Zaghicha) at 5,126 metres (16,818 ft)

The main stream in the district is the Darwāza (Darah-ye Darwāzah), and most of the villages lie along its banks, or those of its tributaries.

== Climate ==
According to the Köppen climate classification, Puli Hisar has a warm-summer humid continental climate (Dsb) bordering closely on a subarctic climate (Dsc), with mild summers and cold, snowy winters.

Climate data for Puli Hisar
Month	Jan	Feb	Mar	Apr	May	Jun	Jul	Aug	Sep	Oct	Nov	Dec	Year
Daily mean °F (°C)	8.4 (−13.1)	12.7 (−10.7)	25.2 (−3.8)	39.2 (4.0)	47.3 (8.5)	55.0 (12.8)	59.0 (15.0)	57.7 (14.3)	50.0 (10.0)	38.8 (3.8)	25.2 (−3.8)	13.3 (−10.4)	36.0 (2.2)
Average precipitation inches (mm)	2.39 (60.7)	3.55 (90.1)	3.75 (95.2)	3.41 (86.7)	2.19 (55.5)	0.62 (15.8)	0.57 (14.5)	0.55 (13.9)	0.36 (9.2)	1.01 (25.6)	1.30 (32.9)	1.74 (44.1)	21.44 (544.2)
Source: https://climatecharts.net/

== Economy ==
Puli Hisar is one of Baghlan's main opium poppy cultivating districts.
