= Saydulla Madaminov =

Uzbek colonel

Colonel Saydulla Madaminov
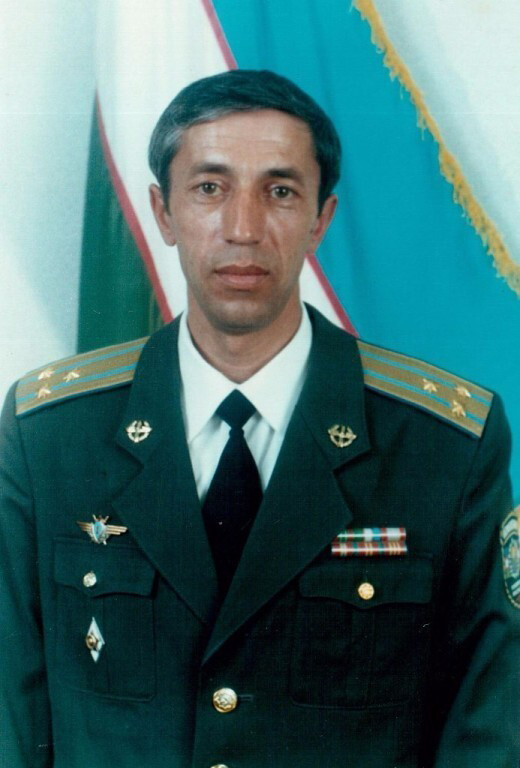
- Colonel Saydulla Madaminov
- Born: September 4, 1957 (age 69); Osh, Kirghiz SSR, Soviet Union
- Military career
- Allegiance: Soviet Union; Uzbekistan
- Service years: 1974-2007
- Rank: Colonel
- Commands: Uzbekistan Air and Air Defence Forces
- Conflicts: Tajikistani Civil War; Batken Conflict
- Awards: Medal For Distinction in Military Service; Shon-Sharaf Order; Medal Jasorat

Saydulla Abdukuddusovich Madaminov is a retired Uzbek colonel who served as the 4th Commander of Uzbekistan Air and Air Defence Forces from 2001 to 2003.

== Life and military service ==
After graduation from Yeisk Higher Military Aviation Institute (EVVAUL), he went to Transbaikal Military District where he joined the 23rd Air Army, first at Step, and then at Dzhida.

In 1982, he was promoted to flight commander. Later in 1983, he got transferred to Brand-Briesen Airfield in East Germany to join the Group of Soviet Forces in Germany. By 1987, he rose to squadron leader. In 1991, after accomplishing his second tertiary qualification at Gagarin Air Force Academy in Monino, he was sent to continue his Soviet military service at the Turkestan Military District.

In the summer of 1991, he arrived at the Karshi-Khanabad Air Base, where became the Chief of Staff and the First Deputy to the Commander of the 735th Aviation Regiment. After the dissolution of the USSR, he was appointed the Commander of the 735th Aviation Regiment, which in August 1995 was renamed the 60th Aviation Regiment of the newly formed Uzbekistan Air and Air Defence Forces.

In the mid-90s, the Uzbek Air Force became embroiled in the Tajikistani Civil War where Colonel Madaminov carried out numerous sorties targeting the Islamic terrorism. In the late 90s, he participated in military operations for neutralizing the Islamic Movement of Uzbekistan fighters who had taken over some mountainous areas in the northern Surxondaryo Region and later launched an incursion into the Batken and Osh regions of Kyrgyzstan.

In 1999, the Ministry of Defence transferred Saydulla Madaminov to the capital Tashkent where he was promoted to the Deputy Commander of the Uzbekistan Air and Air Defence Forces.

In 2001, by decree of the President Islam Karimov, Colonel Saydulla Madaminov was appointed the Commander of the Uzbekistan Air and Air Defence Forces. He remained in that role until late 2003. After that, he was transferred to become a senior military advisor and inspector for the Ministry of Defence of Uzbekistan. In August 2007, he retired from the military.

In 1994, he received his first state award of independent Uzbekistan, Zhasorat medal (Medal of Valor) and Shon-Sharaf Order.
