= List of Embraer C-390 Millennium orders and deliveries =

This article lists the orders and deliveries for the C-390 Millennium family, currently produced by Embraer.

== Summary of orders and deliveries by type ==
Type	Orders	Deliveries	Backlog	Options and negotiations
C-390	30	2	28	23
KC-390	32	14	18	13
TOTAL	62	16	46	36

As of September 2026

== Orders and deliveries by customer ==
=== Detailed orders and deliveries by customer ===
The orders don't include the prototypes that won't be used operationally.

Customer	Date of order (contract signed)	Firm orders			Options			Negotiations			Deliveries			Notes
Customer	Date of order (contract signed)	C-390	KC-390	Total	C-390	KC-390	Total	C-390	KC-390	Total	C-390	KC-390	Total	Notes
(Austria) Austrian Air Force	Jul 2024	+ 4	–	4	–	–	0	–	–	0	0	–	0	
(Brazil) Brazilian Air Force	May 2014	–	+ 28	19	–	–	0	–	–	0	–	+ 8	8	
(Brazil) Brazilian Air Force	Jun 2022	–	6	19	–	–	0	–	–	0	–	+ 8	8	
(Brazil) Brazilian Air Force	Oct 2022	–	3	19	–	–	0	–	–	0	–	+ 8	8	
(Colombia) Colombian Air Force	Aug 2026	–	+ 2	2	–	–	0	–	–	0	0	–	0	
(Czech Republic) Czech Air Force	Oct 2024	+ 2	–	2	–	–	0	–	–	0	1	–	1	
(Greece) Hellenic Air Force	Nov 2026	–	+ 3	3	–	+ 3	3	–	–	0	0	–	0	
(Hungary) Hungarian Air Force	Nov 2020	–	+ 2	2	–	–	0	–	–	0	–	+ 2	2	
(Lithuania) Lithuanian Air Force	Jun 2025	–	–	0	–	–	0	+ 3	–	3	–	–	0	
Netherlands Air and Space Force	Jul 2024	+ 5	–	5	–	–	0	–	–	0	0	–	0	
(Portugal) Portuguese Air Force	Aug 2019	–	+ 5	6	–	–	10	–	–	0	–	+ 4	4	
(Portugal) Portuguese Air Force	Sep 2025	–	+ 1	6	–	+ 10	10	–	–	0	–	+ 4	4	
(Slovakia) Slovak Air Force	Dec 2024	–	–	0	–	–	0	+ 3	–	3	–	–	0	
(South Korea) South Korean Air Force	Dec 2023	+ 3	–	3	–	–	0	–	–	0	0	–	0	
(Sweden) Swedish Air Force	Mar 2025	–	–	4	–	–	7	+ 4	–	0	–	–	0	
(Sweden) Swedish Air Force	Oct 2025	+ 4	–	4	+ 7	–	7	4	–	0	0	–	0	
(United Arab Emirates) UAE Air Force	May 2026	+ 10	–	10	+ 10	–	10	–	–	0	0	–	0	
Uzbekistan Air Force	Feb 2026	+ 2	–	2	–	–	0	–	–	0	1	–	1	
TOTAL		30	32	62	17	13	30	6	0	6	2	14	16	

As of September 2026

=== Summary of the firm orders and deliveries by customers ===
As of September 2026

== Orders and deliveries by year ==
=== Distributive representation ===
C-390 Millennium family orders and deliveries by year (distributive)
		2014	2015	2016	2017	2018	2019	2020	2021	2022	2023	2024	2025	2026	Total
Orders	C-390	–	–	–	–	–	–	–	–	–	3	11	4	12	30
Orders	KC-390	28	–	–	–	–	5	2	–	9	–	–	1	5	32
Deliveries	C-390	–	–	–	–	–	–	–	–	–	–	–	–	2	2
Deliveries	KC-390	–	–	–	–	–	2	2	1	1	1	3	3	1	14
Deliveries	Total deliveries C-390M family	0	0	0	0	0	2	2	1	1	1	3	3	3	16

As of September 2026

=== Cumulative representation ===
Orders Deliveries
As of September 2026

== List of deliveries ==
Customer	Delivery n°	Date of delivery	Registration n°	Source
(Brazil) Brazilian Air Force	Delivery n°1	Sep 2019	FAB2853	
(Brazil) Brazilian Air Force	Delivery n°2	Dec 2019	FAB2854	
(Brazil) Brazilian Air Force	Delivery n°3	Jun 2020	FAB2855	
(Brazil) Brazilian Air Force	Delivery n°4	Dec 2020	FAB2856	
(Brazil) Brazilian Air Force	Delivery n°5	Dec 2021	FAB2857	
(Brazil) Brazilian Air Force	Delivery n°7	Jun 2023	FAB2858	
(Brazil) Brazilian Air Force	Delivery n°10	Sep 2024	FAB2859	
(Brazil) Brazilian Air Force	Delivery n°12	Oct 2025	FAB 2860	
(Czech Republic) Czech Air Force	Delivery n°15	6 Jul 2026	0520	
(Hungary) Hungarian Air Force	Delivery n°9	Sep 2024	HuAF 610	
(Hungary) Hungarian Air Force	Delivery n°13	Nov 2025	HuAF 611	
(Portugal) Portuguese Air Force	Delivery n°6	Oct 2022	26901	
(Portugal) Portuguese Air Force	Delivery n°8	Jun 2024	26902	
(Portugal) Portuguese Air Force	Delivery n°11	Jul 2025	26903	
(Portugal) Portuguese Air Force	Delivery n°14	Jan 2026	26904	
Uzbekistan Air and Air Defence Forces	Delivery n°16	Sep 2026	UK 39010	

As of September 2026

== See also ==
- Embraer C-390 Millennium
