= Tulkun =

Tulkun may refer to:

- Tulkun, a fictional xeno-cetacean-analogue found in Avatar: The Way of Water (Avatar 2) and on the world of Pandora.
- Avatar: The Tulkun Rider, the working title for Avatar 4
- Tulkun Kasimov (1945-2025), Soviet-Uzbek retired military officer
