= Uzbek Ground Forces =

- Özbekiston quruqlik qöşinlari Сухопутные войска Узбекистана
- Founded: 1992
- Country: Uzbekistan
- Type: Army
- Size: 90,000-100,000 (est. 2025)
- Part of: Armed Forces of the Republic of Uzbekistan
- Headquarters: Tashkent
- Nickname: Uzbek Land Forces
- Colors: Steel Blue
- Anniversaries: Defender of the Motherland Day - January 14
- Engagements: Tajik Civil War; Batken Conflict; War in Afghanistan (2001–2021)

Insignia
- Flag

The Uzbek Ground Forces are the land component of the Armed Forces of the Republic of Uzbekistan. Operating since the collapse of the Soviet Union in 1991, the army is made up of former Soviet Army units that were in the territory of Uzbekistan. As of 2006, it had around 40,000 active personnel. Much of the equipment it uses is also old Soviet material, and the government of Uzbekistan has not given much effort to replace it with modern equipment.

== History ==
The armed forces were created in 1992, and along with the army, the air and air defense forces, national guard, and border service were created. Islam Karimov, the then President of Uzbekistan, began calling native Uzbeks in the Soviet Armed Forces back to Uzbekistan to fill the ranks of the newly created ground forces, though many refused to return and renounced their citizenship. Russians made up the majority of the officer corps, while the enlisted personnel were mainly Uzbek.

Uzbekistan then became the only Central Asian state that did not allow Russian Federation citizens to serve in the army, and began to replace the Slavic officers with ethnic Uzbeks. At independence, Slavic officers made up the command of the army, and thus an effort was made to give Uzbeks higher positions, giving Slavics lower ranks. The Slavs who stayed in Uzbekistan accepted Uzbek passports.

Three major Soviet military academies, the Tashkent Higher All-Arms Command School, the Chirchiq Higher Tank Command and Engineering School, and the Samarkand Higher Military Automobile Command School, were located in Uzbekistan. This caused the government to not send Uzbek officers to Russia for training. In 1994, they established the joint Armed Forces Academy, to train officers of all branches. Though the Uzbek language was becoming more in use by the army, Russian remained the main language used in training officers, due to the fact that most manuals were in Russian and that the Central Asian Turkic languages did not have proper military vocabulary.

In 1997, the United States CENTRASBAT program paid over $5 million to fund a training exercise between Uzbek and American troops that were going to be stationed in the country. Later in 1998, a US general attended an Uzbek base that had a unit which took part in the training. Most Uzbek soldiers leave the service when their mandatory conscription ends. The US forces have found this to be the case in Kyrgyzstan and Kazakhstan as well. The army was similarly run to the Soviet one, in terms of command, service, and equipment. Senior commanders gave strict orders that allowed little freedom of decision.

In 2003, the defense ministry announced that the conscription time was lowered from 18 months to 12, and those who attended officer schools only had to serve nine months. It was encouraging higher ranking personnel to serve longer. Many young Uzbeks bribed recruitment officials to not draft them into the army, as dedovshchina was widespread.

== Organization ==
=== Districts ===
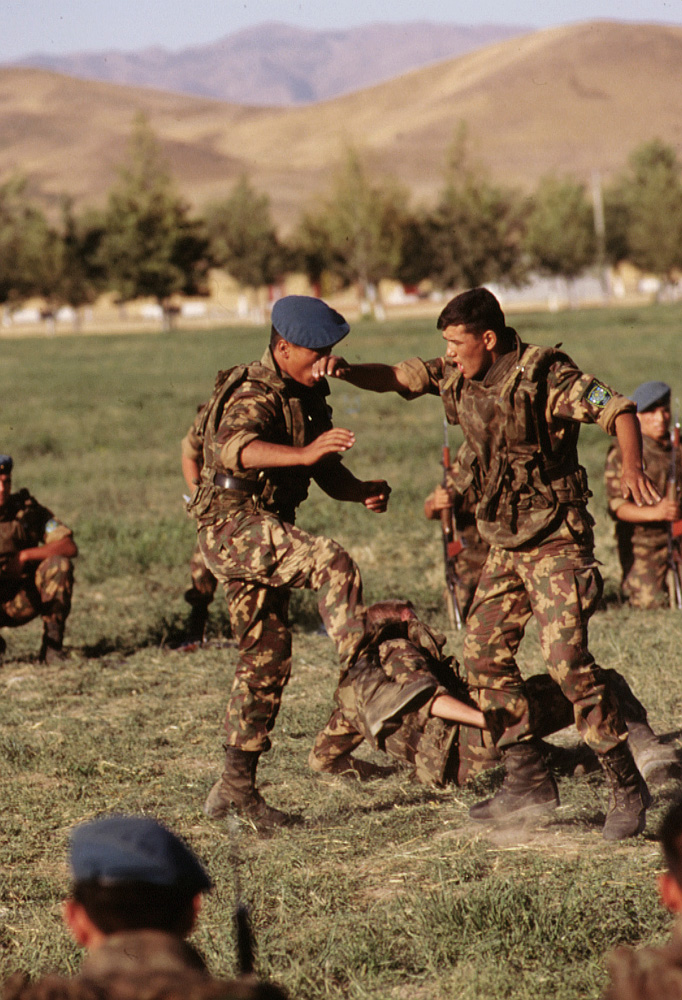
Uzbek soldiers practice hand to hand maneuvers

The Army includes five military districts, the Northwest at Nukus, the Southwest Special Military District at Karshi, the Central Military District at Dzhizak, and the Eastern Military District at Ferghana. In 2001, the Tashkent Garrison was transformed into the Tashkent Military District.

Formation	Headquarters Location	Notes
Northwest Military District	HQ Nukus	Karakalpakstan, Xorazm Province
Southwest Special Military District	HQ Karshi	Qashqadaryo Province, Surxondaryo Province, Bukhara Province, Navoiy Province
Central Military District	HQ Dzhizak	Dzhizak Province, Samarqand Province, Sirdaryo Province
Eastern Military District	HQ Ferghana	Fergana Province, Andijan Province, Namangan Province
Tashkent Military District	HQ Tashkent	Tashkent Province, Established 2001

=== Specialties ===
- Airborne Forces
- Army Aviation Units
- Army engineering maintenance
- Army judge advocate
- Army research and development
- Army veterinary corps
- CBRN Defense Units
- Civil Affairs Units
- Combat engineer
- Cyberwarfare Units
- Electronic warfare Units
- Explosive Ordnance Disposal Units
- Field artillery and air defense artillery
- Finance and comptroller
- Human resources
- Military band
- Military intelligence
- Military logistics
- Military medicine
- Military operation plan
- Military polices
- Military working dogs
- Motor Rifle Troops Units
- Public Affairs Units
- Quartermaster
- Reconnaissance and Surveillance Units
- Signal Corps
- Spetsnaz (special forces)
- Strategic plans and policy functional
- Tank Forces
- Topogeodetic survey

== List of Formations ==
There are four motor rifle brigades, and the 17th Air Assault Brigade at Fergana (the former 387th Airborne Training Regiment of the Soviet Airborne Forces). Motorized brigades are located around Bukhara, Samarqand, Termez, Nukus, and Andijan. The subordinate brigades listed below have been attributed to the various military districts either because they are located in the same city as the military district headquarters or are clearly within the military districts' area of responsibility.

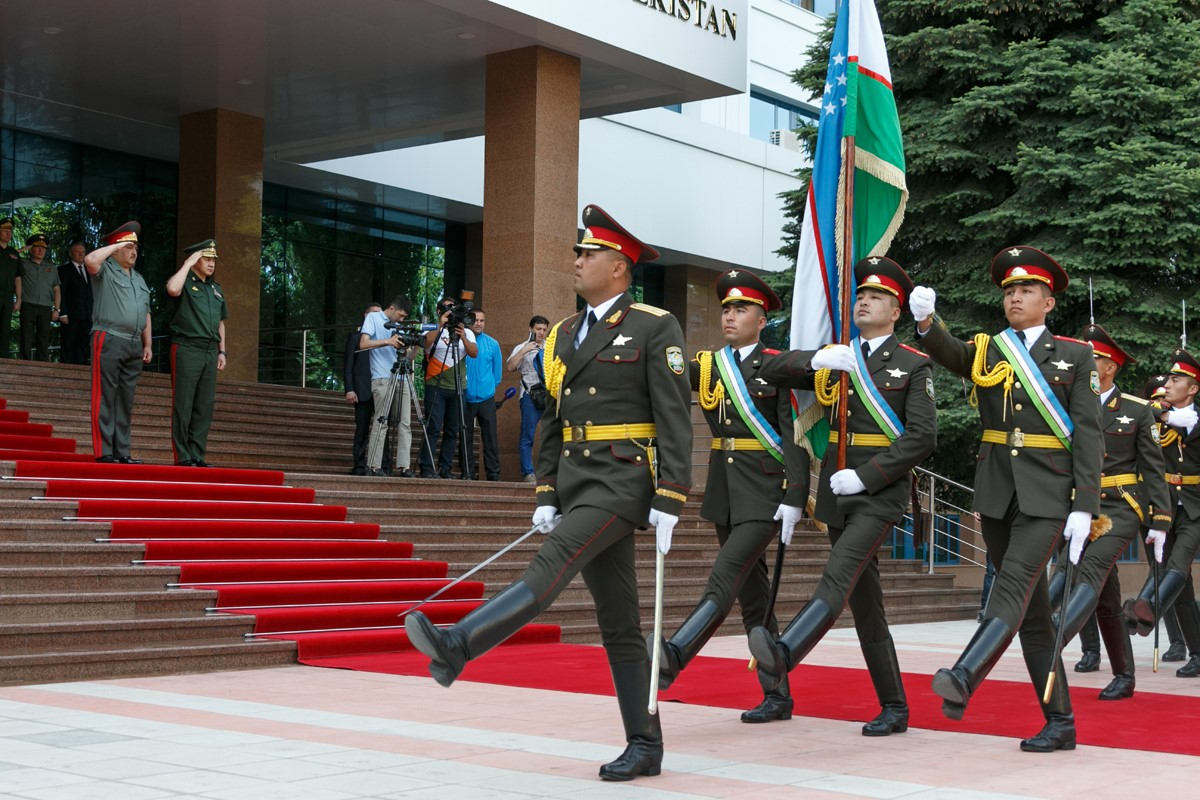
The Honour Guard Battalion at the Ministry of Defense.

=== Army Headquarters (Tashkent) ===
- Honor Guard Battalion of the Tashkent Military District
- Combat Engineering Brigade
- Special Forces Battalion of the Eastern Military District "Lynx"

=== Regular Army ===
- Training Regiment (Chirchik)
- 387th Airborne Training Regiment
- 17th Air Assault Brigade at Fergana - Consists of up to 5000 soldiers, was formerly the Soviet 105th Guards Vienna Airborne Division.
- 1st Motor Rifle Brigade (Chirchik)
- 2nd Motor Rifle Brigade (Samarqand)
- 3rd Motor Rifle Brigade (Termez)
- 25th Motor Rifle Brigade (Karshi, Military Unit No.08579)
- 37th Motor Rifle Brigade (Andijan)
- 13th Artillery Brigade (Kattarkurgan, Central MD)
- 15th Independent Special Forces Brigade
- Tank Regiment (Ahangaran)

== Facilities ==
- Kattakurgan Training Ground
- Gurumsaray Training Ground
- Farish Mountain Training Area
- Shorsu Training Ground
- Angren Training Ground
- Nuristan Training Ground
- Termez Training Ground
- Nukus Training Ground

== Exercises ==
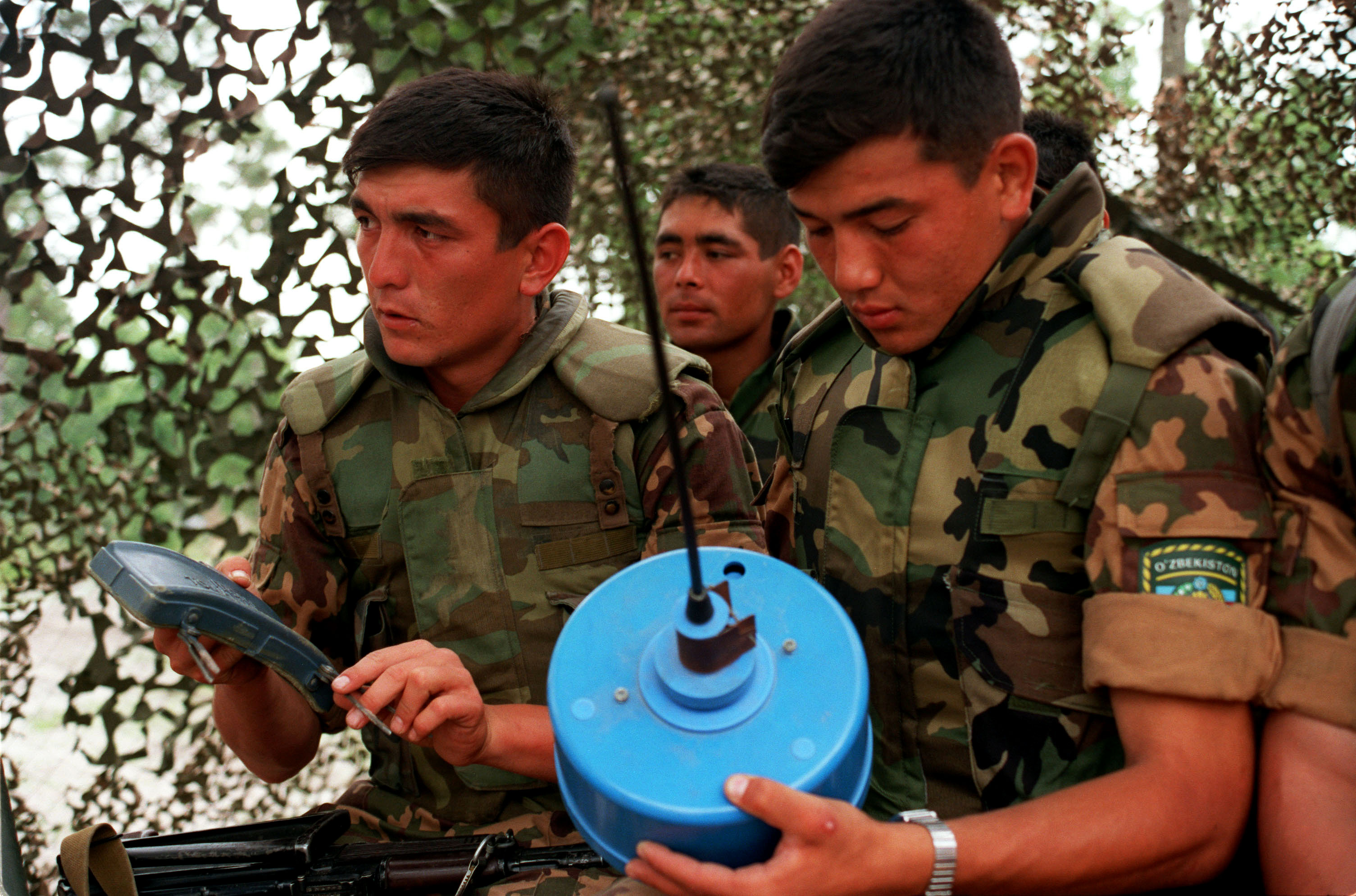
Uzbek soldiers in the Exercise Cooperative Osprey '98

Uzbek troops participated in Partnership for Peace Exercise Cooperative Osprey '96 at Camp Lejeune in North Carolina, hosted by the United States Marine Corps. They then participated as well in Exercise Cooperative Osprey '98.

In September 2004, the (then) Royal Welsh Regiment (now 3rd Bn The Royal Welsh) of the British Army participated with the Uzbek Army Peacekeeping Battalion in "Exercise Timurlane Express" in the Farish Mountain Training Area. This was a 3-week NATO sponsored Partnership for Peace training exercise.

== Equipment ==
Reportedly, Uzbek armed forces' small arms include the AKM, AK-74, Dragunov sniper rifle, Makarov PM pistol and PK.

Current equipment
Name	Photo	Origin	Type	Quantity
Small arms
Makarov PM		Soviet Union	Semi-automatic pistol	N/A
Fort-12		Ukraine	Semi-automatic pistol	N/A
AKM		Soviet Union	Assault rifle	N/A
AK-74		Soviet Union	Assault rifle	N/A
AKS-74U		Soviet Union	Assault rifle	N/A
RPK		Soviet Union	Squad automatic weapon	N/A
RPK-74		Soviet Union	Squad automatic weapon	N/A
PKM		Soviet Union	General-purpose machine gun	N/A
SVD		Soviet Union	Designated marksman rifle	N/A
Grenade launchers
RPG-7		Soviet Union	Rocket-propelled grenade launcher	
RPG-16		Soviet Union	Rocket-propelled grenade launcher	
SPG-9		Soviet Union	Recoilless gun	
Tanks
T-72		Soviet Union	Main battle tank	70
T-64B		Soviet Union	Main battle tank	100
T-62M/MV		Soviet Union	Main battle tank	170
Infantry fighting vehicles
BMP-1		Soviet Union	Infantry fighting vehicle	180
BMP-2		Soviet Union	Infantry fighting vehicle	270
BMD-1		Soviet Union	Infantry fighting vehicle	120
BMD-2		Soviet Union	Infantry fighting vehicle	9
BRM-1K		Soviet Union	Reconnaissance vehicle	6
Infantry mobility vehicles
Oshkosh M-ATV		United States	MRAP, Infantry mobility vehicle	308
International MaxxPro		United States	MRAP, Infantry mobility vehicle	50
Typhoon-K		Russia	Armored combat vehicle	45+
Nurol Ejder (4x4 version)		Turkey	Infantry mobility vehicle	24 received (+1000 in order)
Personnel carriers
BTR-60		Soviet Union	Armoured personnel carrier	24
BTR-70		Soviet Union	Armoured personnel carrier	25
BTR-80		Soviet Union	Armoured personnel carrier	210
BTR-82A		Russia	Armoured personnel carrier	100
BTR-D		Soviet Union	Armoured personnel carrier	50
Armored car
BRDM-2		Soviet Union	Armored car	13
Rocket artillery
BM-21 Grad		Soviet Union	122mm multiple rocket launcher	50
BM-27 Uragan		Soviet Union	220mm multiple rocket launcher	48
Anti-aircraft
HQ-9		China	Long-range surface-to-air missile	1 battery
Self-propelled artillery
2S1 Gvozdika		Soviet Union	122mm self-propelled howitzer	18
2S3 Akatsiya		Soviet Union	152mm self-propelled howitzer	17
2S9 Nona		Soviet Union	Self-propelled 120 mm mortar	54
2S5 Giatsint-S		Soviet Union	152mm self-propelled howitzer	17
2S7 Pion		Soviet Union	203mm self-propelled howitzer	48
Logistics and utility vehicles
UAZ-469		Soviet Union	Light utility vehicle	
ZIL-131		Soviet Union	General purpose truck	
