= Birlik-2025 =

Multinational military exercise in Uzbekistan

Birlik-2025 (Uzbek: Birlik-2025, "Unity-2025") was a joint military exercise of Azerbaijan, Kazakhstan, Kyrgyzstan, Tajikistan and Uzbekistan, which took place in Uzbekistan at the Kattakurgan training ground in the Central Military District between 15 and 21 October 2025 (with opening ceremony on 15 October).
