= Madaminov =

Madaminov is a central Asian masculine surname, its feminine counterpart is Madaminova. The surname may refer to the following notable people:

- Mukhiddin Madaminov (born 2006), Uzbek chess grandmaster
- Saydulla Madaminov, Uzbek military officer
