= Shavkat Normatov =

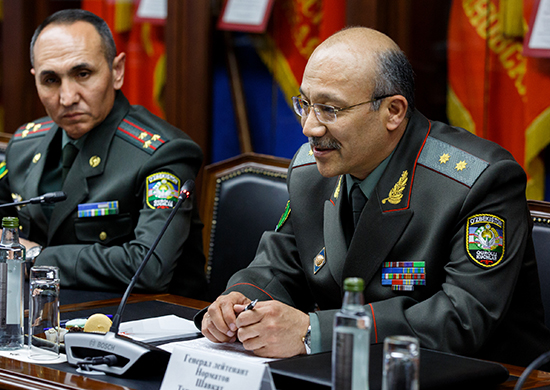
Shavkat Normatov at a meeting with a Russian delegation in April 2017.

Lieutenant General Shavkat Tursunpulatovich Normatov (Russian: Шавкат Турсунпулатович Норматов) is an Uzbek general who serves as the head of the Institute of Military Heritage and Contemporary Studies of the Armed Forces of Uzbekistan.

== Biography ==
He was born in the Uzbek SSR. In 2012–2013, he was the head of the Academy of the Armed Forces of Uzbekistan. On September 23, 2013, President of Uzbekistan, Islam Karimov, appointed Normatov as First Deputy Minister of Defense and Chief of the General Staff. In October 2016, he was dismissed from the post and appointed head of the Andijan Regional Emergency Situations Department. He was succeeded by Major General Pavel Ergashev. In 2023, he was appointed Head of the Institute of Military Heritage and Modern Studies of the Armed Forces.

== Awards ==
- Labor Veteran Badge, 2nd Degree (April 29, 2021)
