= List of awards and honours received by Xi Jinping =

Xi in August 2026

Xi Jinping has been serving as the general secretary of the Chinese Communist Party (CCP) and chairman of the Central Military Commission (CMC), and thus the paramount leader of China, since 2012. He has received multiple honours and recognition from several countries.

== State Honours ==
Decoration	Country	Date	Note	Ref.
Grand Cordon of the Order of Leopold	Belgium	30 March 2014	The highest order of Belgium	
Grand Cordon of the Order of the Liberator	Venezuela	20 July 2014	The highest order of Venezuela	
Order of José Martí	Cuba	22 July 2014	Order of Cuba	
Nishan-e-Pakistan	Pakistan	21 April 2015	The highest civilian award of Pakistan	
Order of Abdulaziz al Saud	Saudi Arabia	19 January 2016	Saudi Arabian order of merit	
Collar of the Order of the Republic of Serbia	Serbia	18 June 2016	The highest state order of Serbia	
Order for Promotion of Peace and Friendship	Belarus	29 September 2016	Order of Belarus	
Medal of Honour of the Congress of Peru	Peru	21 November 2016	Medal of the Congress of Peru	
Order of Saint Andrew	Russia	3 July 2017	The highest order of Russia	
Grand Collar of the State of Palestine	Palestine	18 July 2017	The highest civilian order of Palestine	
Order of Zayed	United Arab Emirates	20 July 2018	The highest civilian decoration of the United Arab Emirates	
Grand Cross of the Order of the Lion	Senegal	29 July 2018	Order of Senegal	
Collar of the Order of the Liberator General San Martin	Argentina	2 December 2018	Order of Argentina	
Order of Manas	Kyrgyzstan	13 June 2019	The highest order of Kyrgyzstan	
Order of the Crown	Tajikistan	15 June 2019	Order of Tajikistan	
Order of the Golden Eagle	Kazakhstan	14 September 2022	The highest order of Kazakhstan	
Order of Highest Friendship	Uzbekistan	15 September 2022	State award of Uzbekistan	
Order of South Africa	South Africa	22 August 2023	State award of South Africa	
Medal of the National Order of Independence	Cambodia	17 April 2025	Order of Cambodia	

== Recognition ==
Decoration	Organisation	Date	Note	Ref.
The Golden Olympic Order	International Olympic Committee	19 November 2013	The highest award of the Olympic movement	

Year	Recognition	Organisation	Ref.
2017	World's Most Powerful Man	The Economist	
2018	World's Most Powerful People	Forbes	

== Key to the City ==
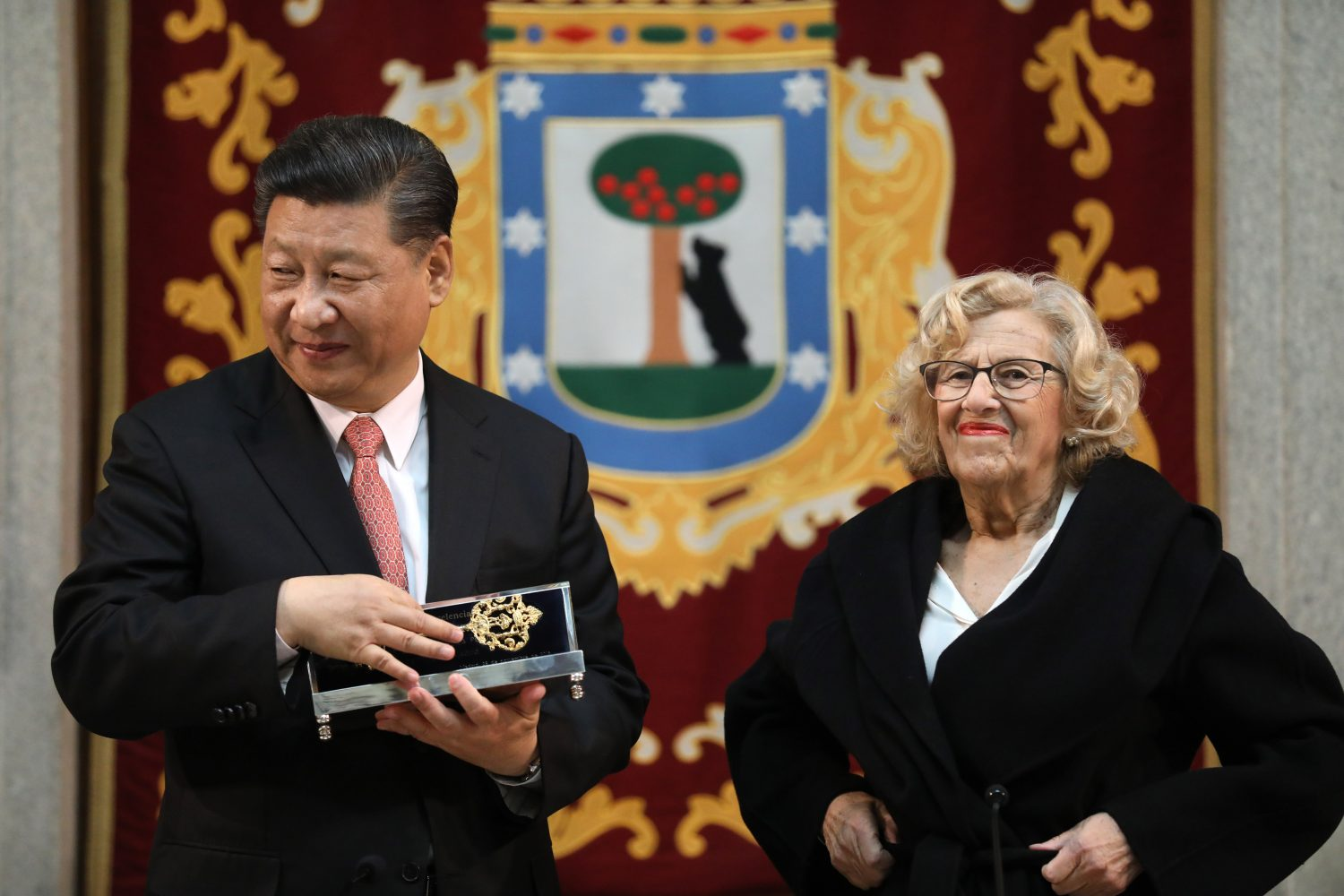
Xi receiving Keys to the City of Madrid, Spain

Xi holds a "key to the city," an honour granted to attending guests to symbolize their significance, in:

- (Iowa) Muscatine, United States (26 April 1985)
- Montego Bay, Jamaica (13 February 2009)
- Muscatine, United States (14 February 2012)
- San José, Costa Rica (3 June 2013)
- Mexico City, Mexico (5 June 2013)
- Buenos Aires, Argentina (19 July 2014)
- Prague, Czech Republic (29 March 2016)
- Madrid, Spain (28 November 2018)

== Scholastic ==
- Nazarbayev University (7 September 2013)
- University of Johannesburg (11 April 2019)
- Saint Petersburg State University (6 June 2019)
- King Saud University (8 December 2022)

== Eponyms ==
=== Roads ===
- In 2024, a major ring road in the Cambodian capital of Phnom Penh, was named 'Xi Jinping Boulevard' in recognition of Cambodia–China relations.
