= Commander of the Air and Air Defence Forces (Uzbekistan) =

Administrative head in the Uzbekistan military

Commander of Air and Air Defence Forces
- Flag of the Air and Air Defence Forces

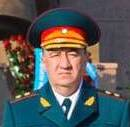
- Incumbent; Major General Akhmad Burkhanov since 2018
- Ministry of Defence
- Reports to: Chief of the General Staff
- Seat: Tashkent
- Constituting instrument: Constitution of Uzbekistan

The Commander of the Air and Air Defence Forces is the administrative head in the Uzbekistan Air and Air Defence Forces, and is under the Chief of the General Staff and the Ministry of Defence. The current Commander of the Air and Air Defence Forces is Major General Akhmad Burkhanov. The Commander of the Air and Air Defence Forces is a de facto Deputy Minister of Defence.

== List of commanders ==
No.	Portrait	Name (born–died)	Term of office			Ref.
No.	Portrait	Name (born–died)	Took office	Left office	Time in office	Ref.
		Major General; Tohir Yusupov	1992			
		Major General; Abdulla Xolmuhamedov	2003	2008	4–5 years	
		Major General; Akhmad Burkhanov	2018	Incumbent	7–8 years	
