= Bakhodir Tashmatov =

Uzbek general

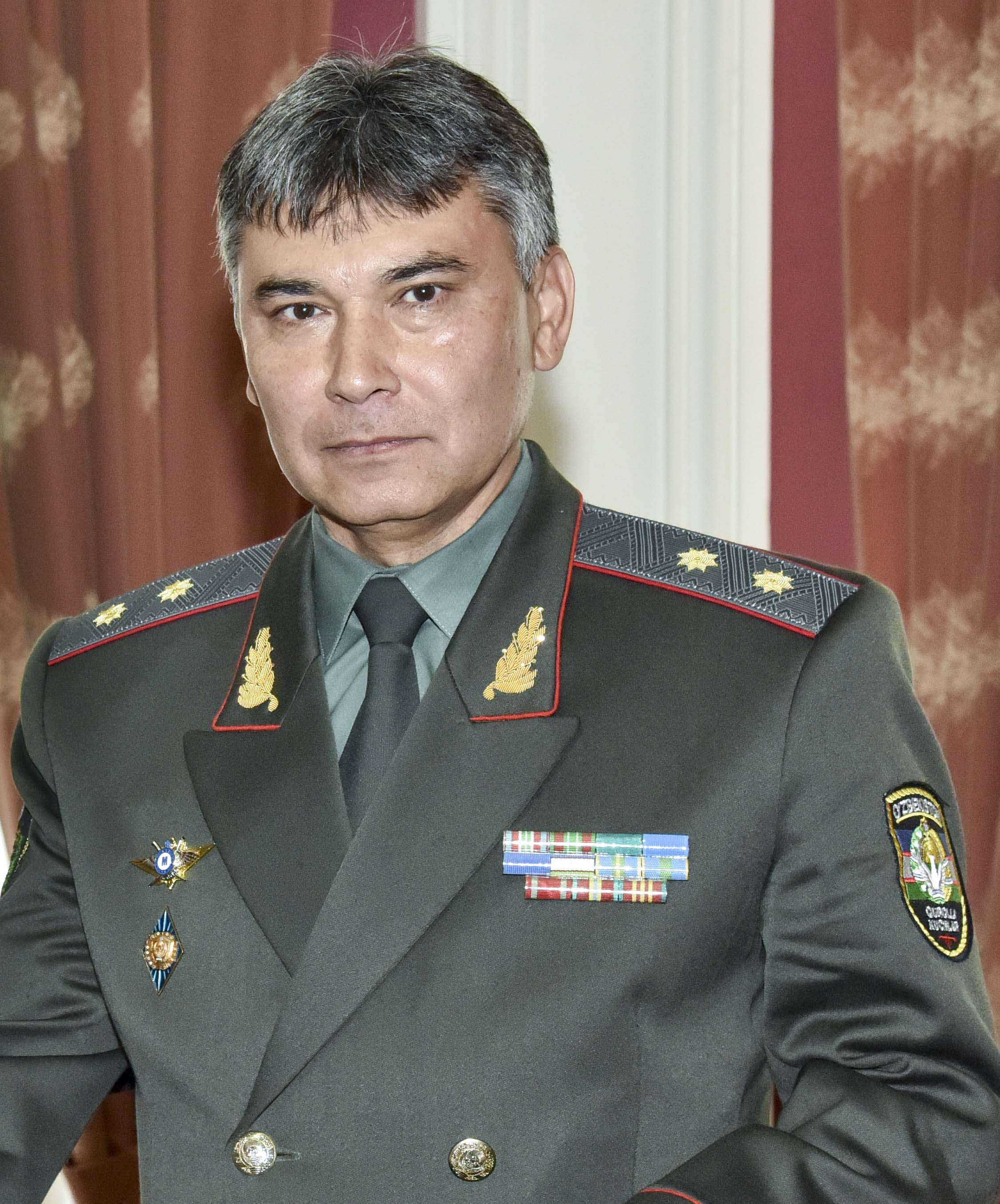
Toshmatov with the Commander of the United States Central Command General Joseph Votel on May 12, 2018.

Colonel General Bakhodir Khamidovich Tashmatov is an Uzbek military leader and security official. He was born in 1964 in the Uzbek SSR. He graduated from the Tashkent Higher All-Arms Command School, the Academy of the Armed Forces of Uzbekistan, the Military Academy of the General Staff of the Russian Armed Forces, as well as the Fergana State University.

He served in various positions of command personnel in the troops of the Turkestan Military District of the Soviet Army and later throughout the 90s, served in leading positions of the Ministry of Defense. From 1999 to 2008 he commanded the troops of the military districts of the Ministry of Defense. From 2008 to 2011, he worked as First Deputy Minister of Defense and Chief of the General Staff, and then, from 2011 to 2013, Secretary of the National Security Council under the President of Uzbekistan. From 2013 to 2017, he served as First Deputy Minister of Defense to General Qobul Berdiyev. From 2017 to 2020, he was Commander of the National Guard of Uzbekistan. In 2020, headed the State Security Service of the President of Uzbekistan (SSBP). On 22 October 2020, he was appointed Deputy Secretary of the Security Council under the President for the development of the armed forces.
