= Shon-Sharaf Order =

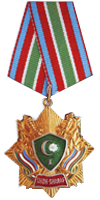

The Shon-Sharaf Order (Uzbek: Shon-sharaf ordeni) or the Order of Glory of Service is a state award of the Republic of Uzbekistan. It was introduced in August 1995. It comes in two classes. The ribbon comes in blue, red, white and green.

== Statute ==
The Order of Glory is awarded to citizens for their devotion and courage in defending the country and strengthening the defense and national security of Uzbekistan.

== Notable recipients (partial list) ==
- Islam Karimov
- Kadyr Gulyamov
- Abdulla Xolmuhamedov
- Pavel Ergashev
- Tulkun Kasimov
- Ismail Ergashev
- Saydulla Madaminov

== See also ==
- Orders, decorations, and medals of Uzbekistan
