= Military Aviation Institute =

Military Aviation Institute of Uzbekistan
- O'zbekiston Respublikasi Harbiy aviatsiya instituti
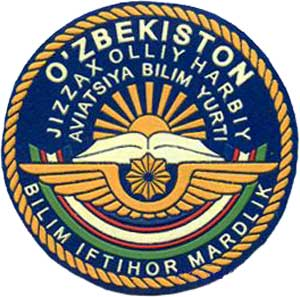
- School patch
- Active: 18 March 1994; 31 years ago
- Country: Uzbekistan
- Branch: Uzbekistan Air and Air Defence Forces
- Type: military academy
- Part of: Ministry of Defense of Uzbekistan
- Garrison/HQ: Qarshi, Qashqadaryo Region
- Website: https://airforce.uz/en/

Commanders
- Head: Colonel Kahramonjon Zoidov

The Military Aviation Institute (Uzbek: O'zbekiston Respublikasi Harbiy aviatsiya instituti) is the military academy of the Uzbek Air Force, located in the city of Qarshi. It is one of 8 military colleges in Uzbekistan. The schools is responsible for preparing highly qualified military personnel with advanced knowledge and specialties.

== History ==
=== Origins ===
On 18 March 1994, by order of President Islam Karimov and the Cabinet of Ministers, the construction of Jizzakh Higher Military Aviation School (Uzbek: Jizzax aviatsiya oliy harbiy bilim yurti / Жиззах авиация олий ҳарбий билим юрти; Russian: Джизакского высшего военного авиационного училища) was initiated. The school was opened that September. The origins of the school are linked to the creation of the Aviation Department at the Tashkent Higher Combined Arms Command School. In 1993, 100 cadets in the flight profile began their studies in the Aviation department in Tashkent. In August 1994, cadets were also admitted for the specialty of technician–mechanic for the operation of aircraft and engines. On 2 October 1994, cadets from the Aviation department of the Tashkent Higher Combined Arms Command School were relocated to Jizzakh. The following day, 3 October 1994, marked the official start of the educational process at the Jizzakh School.

=== Development ===
On 27 April 1995, Minister of Defense Colonel General Rustam Akhmedov, acting on behalf of the President of Uzbekistan, formally presented the military flag of the school. On 18 January 2018, the institution was renamed the Higher Military Aviation School. On 19 June 2019, it was announced that the school would move to Qarshi on 1 September to improve the system of professional military training. The new building is located on Khonabad airfield, on the basis of the former Karshi Sergeant Training School. The new school received an Isuzu bus and a Ravon Gentra as a gift from President Shavkat Mirziyoyev.

== Heads ==
Name	Term	Term End	Notes
Georgiy Abdurakhmanov	1994	1998	
Qadam Vafayev	1999	2003	
Olimjon Ermatov	2003	2010	
Alisher Turdiyev	2010	2017	
Bahtiyor Saidov	2017	2020	
Colonel Kahramonjon Zoidov	30 July 2025	Present	

== Training ==
The school trains officers in the following specialties:

- Pilot-engineer on airplanes and helicopters
- Personnel officer
- Navigator and combat command officer
- Aircraft technician
- Aviation technician

The training of cadets consists of theoretical and flight training and is carried out in stages. Flight training consists of performing test flights with instructor pilots and independent flights. The total flight time during training is 180 hours. The specialization of pilots for a specific aircraft occurs in aviation units after graduation from school.

In 2017, foreign language cadets of the school took part in the International Cadet Olympiad of the Russian Defence Ministry in Yerevan. Many pilots of the Tajik Air Force are trained in the school. In early 2020, a delegation from the Aviation Department of the Military Institute of the Ministry of Defense of Tajikistan visited the Higher Military Aviation School.
