= Ismail Ergashev =

Uzbek general (1945–2018)

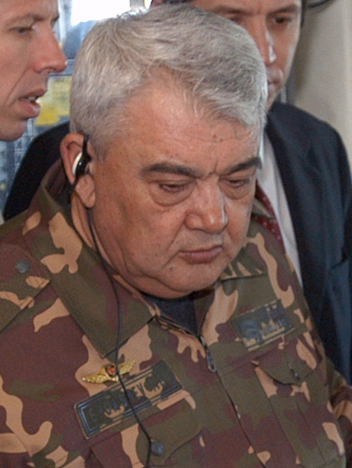

Chief of the Joint Headquarters of the Armed Forces
- In office 2004–2005
- President: Islam Karimov
- Preceded by: Tulkun Kasimov

Personal details
- Born: 5 August 1945 Chelak District, Samarqand Region, Uzbek SSR, Soviet Union
- Died: 24 February 2018 (aged 73) Tashkent, Uzbekistan
- Children: Pavel

Military service
- Allegiance: Uzbekistan
- Rank: Major General

Ismail Ergashevitch Ergashev (Uzbek: Ismoil Ergashevitch Ergashev) was an Uzbek general who has served as second person to hold the post of Chief of the Joint Headquarters of the Armed Forces of the Armed Forces of Uzbekistan from 2004 to 2005. He was one of the first military leaders of Uzbekistan.

== Biography ==
He was born on August 5, 1945, in the Chelak District of the Samarqand Region. Over the years, he served in various command positions. After the Dissolution of the Soviet Union, he headed the department of artillery of the Ministry of Defense, after which he was commander of artillery until 1997. From 1997 to 1999, he was deputy minister of defense for logistics and capital construction, and from 1999 to 2000 was deputy minister of defense for combat training. He became the first head of the Central Military District, serving until 2004. That same year, he became First Deputy Minister of Defense and Chief of the Joint Headquarters of the Armed Forces, succeeding Tulkun Kasimov. He retired from service in 2005.

Ergashev was awarded such high state awards as the Shon-Sharaf Order to the I and II degrees

== Later life ==
From 2005 to 2007, Ergashev was banned from entering the European Union for his involvement in suppressing the 2005 Andijan unrest. He died on 24 February 2018 at the age of 73. The next day the State Museum of the Armed Forces of Uzbekistan held a farewell ceremony with Major General Ergashev. His burial took place at a cemetery in the Samarkand Region, he was born and raised.

His son Pavel Ergashev later served as Chief of the General Staff from 2018 to 2021.
