= Medal of Valor (Uzbekistan) =

Award of Valor for Uzbekistan

- Jasorat medali
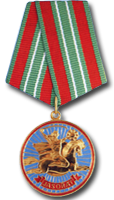
- Type: Medal
- Awarded for: Demonstration of high professional skills, loyalty to military, and patriotic duty
- Country: Uzbekistan
- Established: May 5, 1994
- Winners: Qobul Berdiyev; Boris Anisimovich Bondarenko; Zainab Dayibekova; Nazarmat Egamnazarov; Elbek Sultanov; Feruz Sayidov; Gulrukh Rahimova; Islam Aslanov; Ahmad Jabbarov; Nuritdin Mukhitdinov; Otabek Murodov; Nafisa Sheripboyeva; Malik Kayumov; Ibrahim Rahim; Sevinch Salayeva; Sharif Halilov; Shirin Sharipov; Shohsanamkhan Toshpolatova; Shuhrat Boboyev; Sobirjon Okhunjonov; Saydulla Madaminov
- Ribbon of the Medal of Valor

Medal of Valor (Uzbek: Jasorat medali), also known as the Courage medal, the Jasorat medal, or Zhasorat medal, is one of the orders and medals of the Republic of Uzbekistan. It is awarded for the demonstration of courage, professionalism, and loyalty to Uzbekistan.

== Regulation ==
1. Military servicemen of Uzbekistan, employees of the State Security Service, National Guard, and internal affairs bodies are awarded the Courage Medal for their bravery and courage during military duty or service duty in ensuring the national security of the republic, maintaining public order, saving lives, protecting state and public property during natural disasters, fires, emergencies, and fighting crime. Both citizens and non-citizens of Uzbekistan are eligible for the Medal of Valor.

2. The President of Uzbekistan awards the Medal of Valor, with the decree of the awarding published in the press and other mass media.

3. The approval for awarding the Medal of Valor is granted by the Ministry of Defense of Uzbekistan, the State Security Service of Uzbekistan, the State Security Service of the President of Uzbekistan, the National Guard of Uzbekistan, the Ministry of Internal Affairs of Uzbekistan, the chairman of the Dzhokorgi Council of the Republic of Karakalpakstan, the mayors of the regions, and the city of Tashkent.

4. The Medal of Valor and the corresponding award document are presented in a ceremony by the President of Uzbekistan. Alternatively, they can be presented on behalf of the President by the Speaker of the Legislative Chamber of the Oliy Majlis, the chairman of the senate of the Oliy Majlis, the Prime Minister of Uzbekistan, the Minister of Defense of Uzbekistan, the chairman of State Security Service of Uzbekistan, the chairman of the State Security Service of the President of Uzbekistan, the commander of the National Guard of Uzbekistan, the Minister of Internal Affairs of Uzbekistan, the chairman of the Dzhokorg Council of the Republic of Karakalpakstan, governors of the regions, and the city of Tashkent, as well as other individuals instructed by the President of Uzbekistan.

5. Recipients of the Medal of Valor are entitled to a one-time monetary award equivalent to ten times the minimum wage. They also receive privileges as specified by the law.

6. The Medal of Valor is worn on the left side of the chest.

7. In the event of a posthumous awarding of the Medal of Valor, the medal, the relevant award document, and a one-time monetary award are handed over to the family of the recipient.

== Description ==
The Medal of Valor is made of a copper alloy first plated with 0.5 micron nickel, then 0.25 micron gold, and has a diameter of 34 mm. The obverse of the medal, covered with air-colored enamel, depicts an equestrian warrior holding a shield and sword, symbolizing glory and valor, against a background of sun and radiating rays. "JASORAT" ("courage" or "valor" in Uzbek) is printed in 2 mm raised letters on a red enamel background at the bottom of the medal. The edges of the medal are surrounded by a thick red circle on both sides, and on the front by an additional 0.8 mm. The national coat of arms of the Republic of Uzbekistan is depicted on the back of the medal. Below, the number of the medal is written in 1 mm font. The medal is 3 mm thick and is attached to a five-sided pin covered with a three-color striped silk fabric ribbon 24 mm wide using a ring and a loop. A 4 mm wide green line runs through the middle of the fabric with a 1 mm wide white road on both sides of it. On either side of these lines, there are 2 mm wide green tracks and 5 mm wide red tracks. 2 mm wide green lines pass through the edges of the fabric. The pin is 48mm tall, and 45mm wide. The medal is worn with a clasp.

== See also ==
- Orders, decorations, and medals of Uzbekistan
