= Chief of the General Staff (Uzbekistan) =

Chief of the General Staff of the Armed Forces of Uzbekistan
- O'zbekiston Mudofaa vazirligining Bosh shtabi boshlig'i
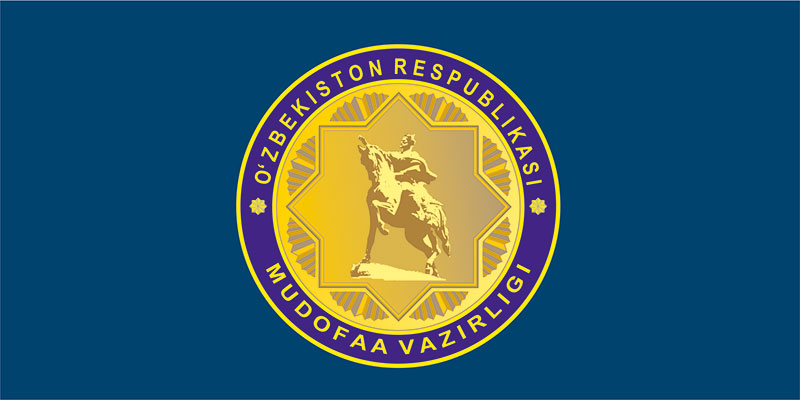
- Flag of the Ministry of Defence
- Incumbent; Major General Zainobiddin Iminov since 23 November 2024
- Ministry of Defence
- Member of: General Staff of Armed Forces of Uzbekistan; National Security Council
- Reports to: Minister of Defense
- Seat: Tashkent
- Nominator: Prime Minister of Uzbekistan
- Appointer: President of Uzbekistan
- Constituting instrument: Constitution of Uzbekistan
- Precursor: Chief of the General Staff of the Soviet Armed Forces
- Formation: September 2000
- Deputy: Deputy Chief of the General Staff
- Website: Ministry of Defense of Uzbekistan

The Chief of the General Staff of the Ministry of Defense of Uzbekistan (Uzbek: O'zbekiston Mudofaa vazirligining Bosh shtabi boshlig'i) is the highest-ranking military officer of in the Armed Forces of the Republic of Uzbekistan, who is responsible for maintaining the operational command of the military and control over three of the five service branches (Uzbek Ground Forces, Uzbek Air Forces and the Uzbek Naval Forces). Unlike the Minister of Defence, the Chief of the General Staff is required to be a commissioned officer who at least holds the rank of colonel (Polkovnik). Another differentiator between the two positions is that the Chief of the General Staff is not political position while the defense minister can be an active member of the political discourse.

The chief performs the following duties in their role:

- Administrative and operational leadership of the military operations of troops
- Implementation of combat training of troops and adaptation of combat methods to fit modern times.
- Give orders/directives regarding units of the armed forces

== Professional military chiefs before 2000 ==
No.	Portrait	Chief of the General Staff	Took office	Left office	Time in office	Ref.
?	Vladimir Makhmudov	Lieutenant general Vladimir Makhmudov (1944–2005)	1995	2000	5 years	

== List of Chiefs since 2000 ==
No.	Portrait	Chief of the General Staff	Took office	Left office	Time in office	Ref.
1	Tulkun Kasimov	Colonel General; Tulkun Kasimov (1945–2025)	September 2000	July 2003	2–3 years	
2	Ismail Ergashev	Major General; Ismail Ergashev (1945–2018)	2004	2005	0–1 years	
?	Bakhodir Tashmatov	Major General; Bakhodir Tashmatov	2008	2011	2–3 years	
?	Viktor Makhmudov	Lieutenant General; Viktor Makhmudov	2011	21 September 2013	1–2 years	
?	Shavkat Normatov	Lieutenant General; Shavkat Normatov	21 September 2013	11 January 2018	4 years	
?	Pavel Ergashev	Major General; Pavel Ergashev	11 January 2018	23 March 2021	3 years	
?	Shukhrat Kholmukhamedov	Major General; Shukhrat Kholmukhamedov	23 March 2021	23 November 2024	3 years	
?	Zainobiddin Iminov	Major General; Zainobiddin Iminov	23 November 2024	Incumbent	1 years	
