= National Security Council under the President of Uzbekistan =

The National Security Council under the President of Uzbekistan (Uzbek: O'zbekiston Respublikasi Prezidenti huzuridagi Milliy xavfsizlik kengashi; Russian: Совет национальной безопасности при Президенте Узбекистана) is the central advisory body of the Uzbek government which aides and assists the President in implementation of military policy.

== Role ==
The Security Council exercises full control to exercise national security powers and forms/implements a national security policy for Uzbekistan. Meetings of the National Security Council of the Republic of Uzbekistan are held at least once a quarter. Extraordinary meetings of the Council may be convened if necessary. A session of the National Security Council may involve any security officials and diplomats. Recommendations and proposals of the National Security Council are adopted by the members of at its meetings by a simple majority and shall enter into force upon approval by the Chairman of the National Security Council. Decisions on security issues are formalized by decrees and orders of the President of the Republic of Uzbekistan.

== Secretaries ==
- Mir-Akbar Hoji-Akbarovich Rakhmankulov (27 November 1997-20 August 2002)
- Ruslan Mirzayev (20 August 2002-18 November 2005)
- Murad Atayev (18 November 2005-2011)
- Bakhodir Tashmatov (2011-2013)
- Viktor Makhmudov (21 September 2013-Present)

== Members ==
Permanent members of the Security Council include the following:

- President, Chairman of the Security Council
- Head of the Presidential Administration, Deputy Chairman of the Security Council
- Prime Minister
- Secretary of the Security Council
- Chairman of the State Security Service
- Foreign Minister
- Minister of Defence
- Heads of chambers in the Oliy Majlis
- the State Security Service
- Commander of the National Guard
- Prosecutor General
- Minister of Investments
- Minister of Foreign Trade
- Minister of Internal Affairs
- Chairman of the Border Troops of the State Security Service
- Head of the State Committee for Defense Industry
- Head of the National Human Rights Centre

== See also ==
- State Security Council of Turkmenistan
- Security Council of Tajikistan
- Security Council of Kyrgyzstan
- Security Council of Kazakhstan
