= Viktor Makhmudov =

Uzbek general

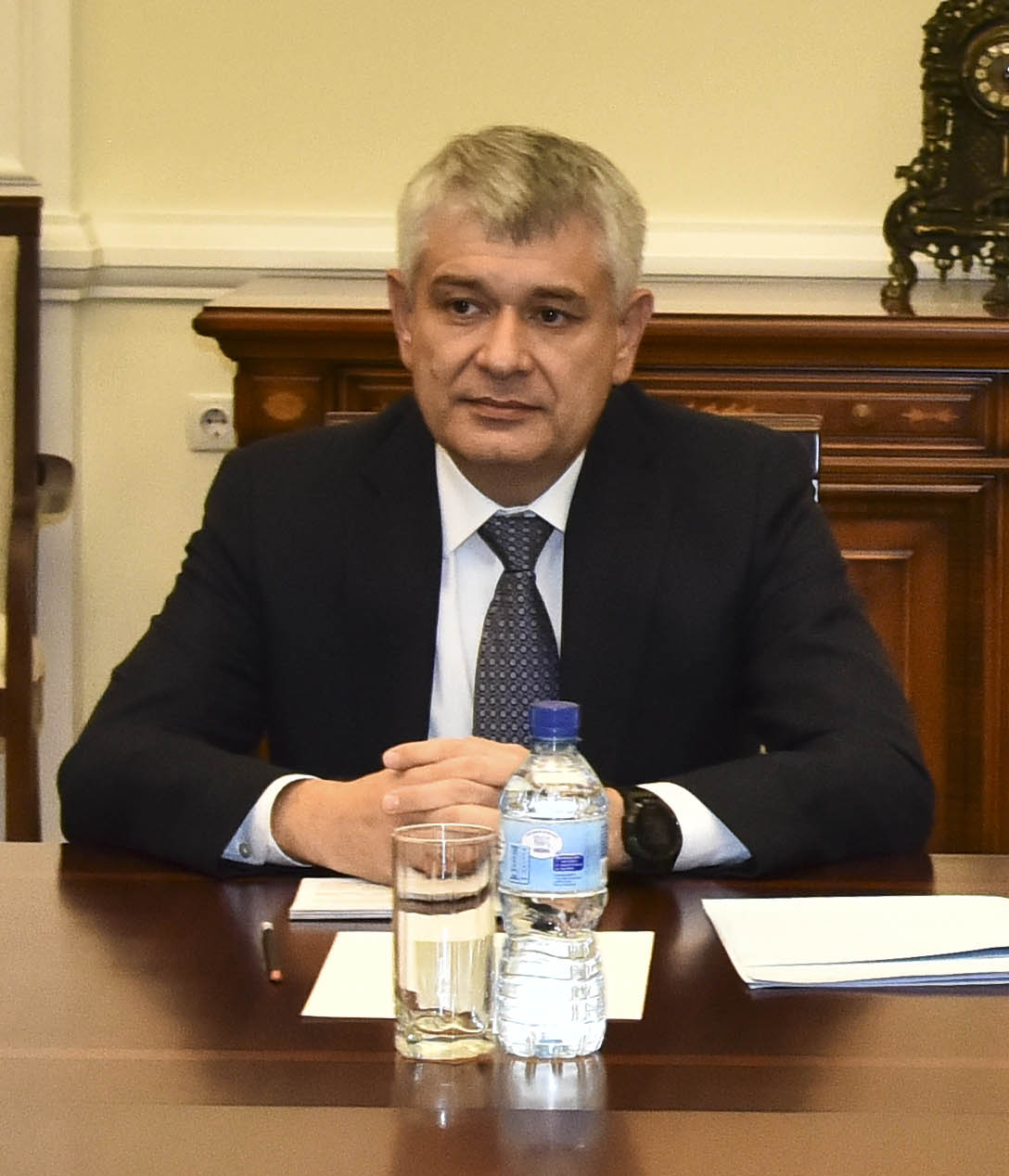
Viktor Makhmudov

Lieutenant General Viktor Vladimirovich Makhmudov is an Uzbek military leader and security official who is the current Secretary of the National Security Council under the President of Uzbekistan. He was appointed to this position on 21 September 2013.

== Early life and career ==
He was born in 1968 into a military family. His father Vladimir Makhmudov (also a general) was the former Academy of the Armed Forces of Uzbekistan and Chief of the General Staff. His grandfather Nasyr Makhmudov was the First Secretary of the Karakalpak Regional Committee of the Communist Party of Uzbekistan during the Soviet era. He graduated from the Tashkent Higher All-Arms Command School. From 9 October 2008 to 9 June 2010, he was commander of the Tashkent Military District. In 2013, President Islam Karimov appointed Makhmudov as secretary of the National Security Council by decree. He had previously worked as First Deputy Minister of Defense and Chief of the General Staff.

Since 14 August 2020, he has been Chairman of the Uzbek Triathlon Federation.
