= Sarab, Baghlan =

Sar Ab سراب
- Location in Afghanistan
- Coordinates: 35°37′25″N 69°36′23″E
- Country: Afghanistan
- Province: Baghlan Province
- District: Puli Hisar
- Time zone: + 4.30

Sarab (also spelled as Sar Ab, Dari: سراب) is a village in Baghlan Province in north eastern Afghanistan.
