= Orders, decorations, and medals of Uzbekistan =

Awards and decorations of Uzbekistan are governed by the laws of the Republic of Uzbekistan on State Awards. The highest award is the title of Hero of Uzbekistan. There are also orders, medals, and honorary titles of Uzbekistan.

== Titles ==
Image	Name (English/Uzbek language)	Description
	Hero of Uzbekistan; Uzbek: Oʻzbekiston qahramoni	Uzbekistan's highest award. Awarded for extreme acts of bravery or unwavering commitment and service benefiting the nation. Unlike the previous Hero of the Soviet Union title, this title can only be awarded to a recipient once.

== Orders ==
Image	Name (English/Uzbek language)	Description
	Order of Highest Friendship; Oliy Darajali Doʻstlik ordeni	Uzbekistan's highest order.
	Order of Independence; Mustaqillik ordeni	
	Order of Amir Temur; Amir Temur ordeni	
	Order of Jalal al-Din Mangburni; Jaloliddin Manguberdi ordeni	Named after Jalal al-Din Mangburni.
	Order of Outstanding Merit; Buyuk xizmatlari uchun ordeni	
	Order "Honor of the country"	On September 16, 2017, during the official visit of President Nursultan Nazarbayev to Uzbekistan, he was awarded the order, the appearance of which differs from the image presented. In particular, the order was presented on a neck ribbon in the colors of the national flag, the badge to which was attached with a metal transition link.
	Order "For Selfless Service"	It is awarded to civilian and military personnel who have made a great contribution to the economic and cultural development, strengthening its defense capability and national security.
	Order of Labour Glory	
	Order "For a healthy generation"	
	Shon-Sharaf Order	
	Order of Friendship	
	Order of Bravery	

== Medals ==
Image	Name	Description
	Medal "Jasorat"	
	Medal "For loyal services"	
	Medal "Kelajak Bunyodkori"	
	Medal "Glory"	

== Honors ==
=== Honorary Titles ===
Honorary titles are introduced for various categories of professions and occupations. The honorary titles are accompanied by the corresponding diploma and badges.

=== Certificate of Honor ===
The Certificate of Honor of the Republic of Uzbekistan is awarded to citizens of Uzbekistan and foreign citizens, as well as enterprises, institutions, organizations, public associations, creative teams and military units and administrative-territorial units of Uzbekistan for labor and military merits, fruitful state, social and creative activities.

== See also ==
- Hero of Uzbekistan
- Orders, decorations, and medals of the Soviet Union
- Awards and decorations of the Russian Federation
