= Darreh-ye Shu =

- Location in Afghanistan
- Coordinates: 35°33′7″N 69°29′15″E
- Country: Afghanistan
- Province: Baghlan Province
- Time zone: + 4.30

Darreh-ye Shu is a village in Baghlan Province in north eastern Afghanistan.

== See also ==
- Baghlan Province
