= Karshi-Khanabad Air Base =

Military airbase of the Uzbek Air Force

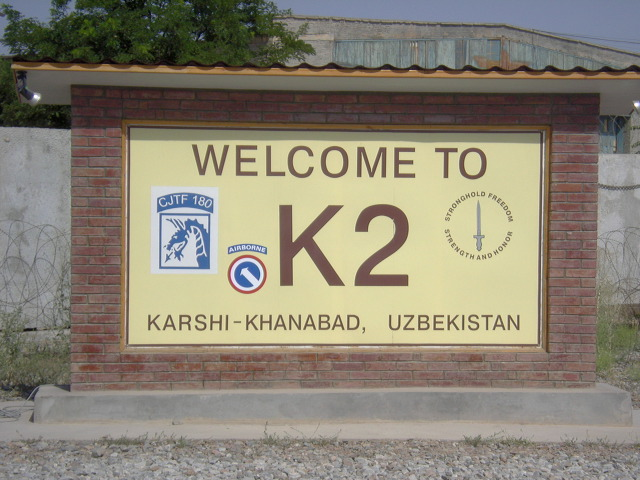
- IATA: none; ICAO: UTSL

Summary
- Airport type: Military
- Location: Karshi, Uzbekistan
- Elevation AMSL: 1,365 ft (416 m)
- Coordinates: 38°50′06″N 65°54′45″E

Map
- Location of air base in Uzbekistan

Runways
Direction	Length		Surface
Direction	m	ft	Surface
07/25	2,498	8,195	Concrete
- Source: DAFIF

Karshi-Khanabad (or K2) is an air base in southeastern Uzbekistan, just east of Karshi. It is home to the 60th Separate Mixed Aviation Brigade of the Uzbek Air Force.

The airport is 1,365 feet (416 m) above mean sea level. It has one runway designated 07/25 with a concrete surface measuring 8,196 by 131 feet (2,498 m × 40 m).

== History ==
From 1954 to 1981, the 735th Fighter Aviation Regiment of the 12th Independent Air Defense Army, Soviet Air Defence Force, was stationed at the base. It was equipped with MiG-15 (July 1950 – 1955), MiG-17 (1955-1969), and then Sukhoi Su-9 (Fishpot) aircraft (1961-1978). The regiment replaced the Su-9 in 1978 with the MiG-23M (Flogger-B).

In 1981 it was renamed the 735th Fighter-Bomber Aviation Regiment, and in 1984 the 735th Bomber Aviation Regiment. Until 1984 the regiment was equipped with the MiG-23M, and from 1984 to 1992 with the Su-24. The regiment was under control of the Soviet Air Forces of the Turkestan Military District from April 1980 to May 1988, and then under 49th Air Army and 73rd Air Army.

On 30 June 1992, control of the base passed from the dissolved Soviet Union to Uzbekistan. From 1992 changes began to affect the regiment before it was merged with other units into the 60th Separate Mixed Aviation Brigade.

== War in Afghanistan ==
Following the 11 September 2001 attacks, U.S. Air Force Colonel Frank J. Kisner, Commander, 16th Operations Group, Hurlburt Field, FL, got to Karshi-Khanabad on 5 October 2001 just as advance elements of 5th Special Forces Group arrived. There he was tasked to carry out combat search and rescue operations. The headquarters of the U.S. 10th Mountain Division arrived at the air base, under Major General Franklin L. Hagenbeck, on 12 December 2001 to function as the Combined Forces Land Component Command (CFLCC) (Forward). The division headquarters served as the representative for Lieutenant General Paul T. Mikolashek, the CFLCC commanding general. It was responsible for controlling virtually all U.S. and allied ground forces in the theater, including the security of airfields in Afghanistan, Uzbekistan, and Pakistan, as well as the logistics operations set up to support those forces. The division was also intended to defend Uzbekistan against incursions by the Islamic Movement of Uzbekistan and other Islamist militant groups based in Afghanistan. On 13 February 2002, Mikolashek ordered Hagenbeck to move CFLCC (Forward) to Bagram Airfield in Afghanistan and two days later the headquarters was redesignated as Combined Joint Task Force (CJTF) Mountain.

Seven thousand United States Department of Defense personnel were located at the base, also known as K2 and "Camp Stronghold Freedom", between 2001 and 2005. There they helped operate against the Taliban and al-Qaeda in neighboring Afghanistan during Operation Enduring Freedom. The 416th Air Expeditionary Group was the host unit. On 29 July 2005, amid strained relations caused by the May 2005 unrest in Uzbekistan, the United States was told to vacate the base within six months. It was vacated by the United States in November 2005.

== Pollution ==
In November 2001, the United States Army Center for Health Promotion and Preventive Medicine-Europe performed an environmental baseline survey at the base. They found widespread jet fuel plumes, usually 1–3 meters under ground, most likely from a leaking Soviet-era underground fuel distribution system as well as smaller, localized areas of surface dirt contaminated with asbestos and low-level radioactive processed uranium. Both were attributed to the destruction of Soviet missiles several years prior.

Former U.S. servicemembers described "black goo" oozing out of the soil, appearing to be a mixture of solvents, oils and other chemicals. Noxious vapors were also reported, along with radiation warning signs and a nearby pond that glowed green. Rainwater would reportedly flood tents and appeared contaminated with various chemicals. According to a 2015 Army study, 61 of the K2 veterans had been diagnosed with cancer or died of the disease, not counting the special operations forces. The United States Department of Veteran's Affairs and U.S. Army Public Health Center had denied that an increased rate of cancers exists or that any contamination at the base posed any serious health problems. DOD took steps to reduce possible sources of contamination, such as filling trenches with soil to create a cap to hold vapors underground, and covering radioactive soil and asbestos, which were criticized as ineffective by veterans.

On 18 November 2020, the US House Committee on Oversight and Reform held a hearing on environmental health risks at the base. A fact sheet was released detailing the health risks at the camp:

- Petrochemical Contamination and Volatile Organic Compounds (VOCs)
- Particulate Matter 10 (PM10) and Tetrachloroethylene
- Burn pits
- Radiation exposure

As of the November 2020 hearing, the Department of Veterans' Affairs denied that the illnesses suffered by veterans at K2 suffered were service-connected.

== See also ==
- Karshi Airport
- Manas Air Base, Kyrgyzstan
- New Great Game
- Islam Karimov
