= Banow =

- Location in Afghanistan
- Coordinates: 35°38′04″N 69°15′34″E
- Country: Afghanistan
- Province: Baghlan Province
- Time zone: + 4.30

Banow is a village in Baghlan Province in north eastern Afghanistan.

== See also ==
- Baghlan Province
