= Order of Highest Friendship =

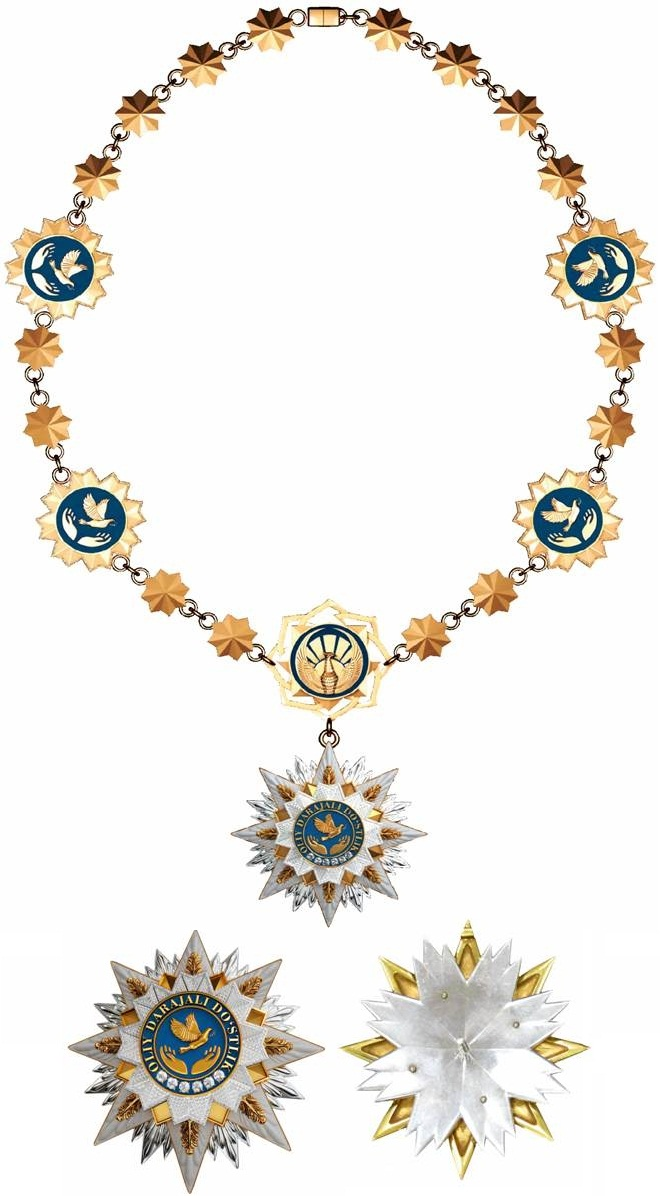
- Type: State honour
- Awarded for: personal contribution to the development of mutually beneficial partnership relations between the Republic of Uzbekistan and foreign countries, strengthening mutual respect and trust
- Presented by: Uzbekistan
- Eligibility: heads of state and government
- Established: 2020
- First award: 2022
- Final award: 2026

Highlights
- Total: 8
- Collar of the order

Precedence
- Next (higher): Hero of Uzbekistan
- Next (lower): Order of Independence

The Order of Highest Friendship Uzbek: Oliy Darajali Doʻstlik ordeni, also translated as the Order of Supreme Friendship and the Order of Friendship of the Highest Degree, is the highest civilian honour of Uzbekistan. It is restricted to foreign heads of state and government. The order was established on the initiative of the President of Uzbekistan Shavkat Mirziyoyev at a session of the Oliy Majlis held on 11 March 2020.

== Recipients ==
Recipient	Date	Citizenship	Ref
Xi Jinping	15 September 2022	China	
Vladimir Putin	6 October 2022	Russia	
António Guterres	1 July 2024	Portugal	
Gurbanguly Berdimuhamedow	24 April 2025	Turkmenistan	
Kassym-Jomart Tokayev	15 November 2025	Kazakhstan	
Serdar Berdimuhamedow	17 November 2025	Turkmenistan	
Ilham Aliyev	23 August 2026	Azerbaijan	
Narendra Modi	30 August 2026	India	
Haitham bin Tariq	16 November 2026	Oman	

== See also ==
- Orders, decorations, and medals of Uzbekistan
