= Central Military District (Uzbekistan) =

- Founded: 2000 – Present
- Country: Uzbekistan
- Branch: Uzbek Ground Forces
- Type: Military district
- Part of: Ministry of Defence
- Headquarters: Jizzakh
- Nickname: Central Operational Command
- Website: https://sarhad.uz/uz/home

Commanders
- Commander of the District: Colonel Farhodjon Shermatov
- Notable commanders: Ismail Ergashev

The Central Military District (Uzbek: Markaziy harbiy okrug) is a military district of the Armed Forces of the Republic of Uzbekistan based in the city of Jizzakh. It serves the territory of Dzhizak Province, Samarqand Province, and Sirdaryo Province.

== Activities ==
On 21 June 2019, the Central Military District and the Samarkand Regional Council of the Youth Union signed a Memorandum of Understanding for cooperation. During the COVID-19 pandemic in Uzbekistan, disinfection works were underway in the Samarkand Region in cooperation with the Central Military District.

== Assets ==
- Center of Spirituality and Enlightenment
- Junior Specialists Training Center
- Kattakurgan Training Ground

In Jizzakh, a library owned by the Central Military District Command has about 8,000 books, of which 5,000 pieces world and Uzbek literature and 500 are history books and textbooks.

== Leadership ==
- Deputy Commander for Educational and Ideological Work - Lieutenant Colonel Nuriddin Kadyrov
