= Pavel Ergashev =

Uzbek general

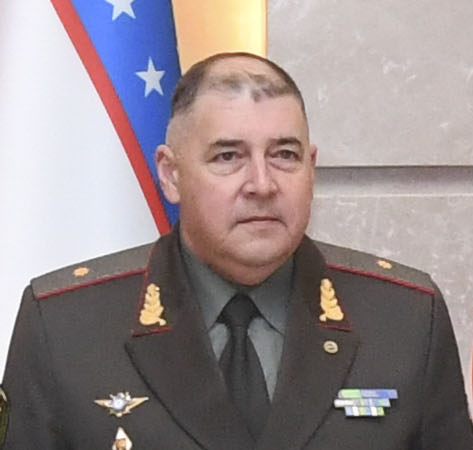
Pavel Ergashev

Major General Pavel Ismailovich Ergashev (born 2 July 1964 in Tashkent) is an Uzbek military leader who is a Chief of the General Staff of the Armed Forces of Uzbekistan. He was appointed to this position on 11 January 2018 and was dismissed in March 2021. He is the son of former chairman of the Joint Chiefs of Staff, Major General Ismail Ergashev. He was among 12 high-ranking officials were banned from entering the European Union for a year in November 2005 for their role in putting down the 2005 Andijan unrest. At the time, he was a Colonel who commanded of a detachment of from the Ministry of Defense. On 4 September 2017, he was appointed by Shavkat Mirziyoyev to the post of Acting Deputy Minister of Defense and commander of the troops of the Southwestern Special Military District.

He was awarded the Shon-Sharaf Order by President Islam Karimov in August 2013.
