= Tulkun Kasimov =

Uzbek general (1945–2025)

- Toʻlqin Qosimov
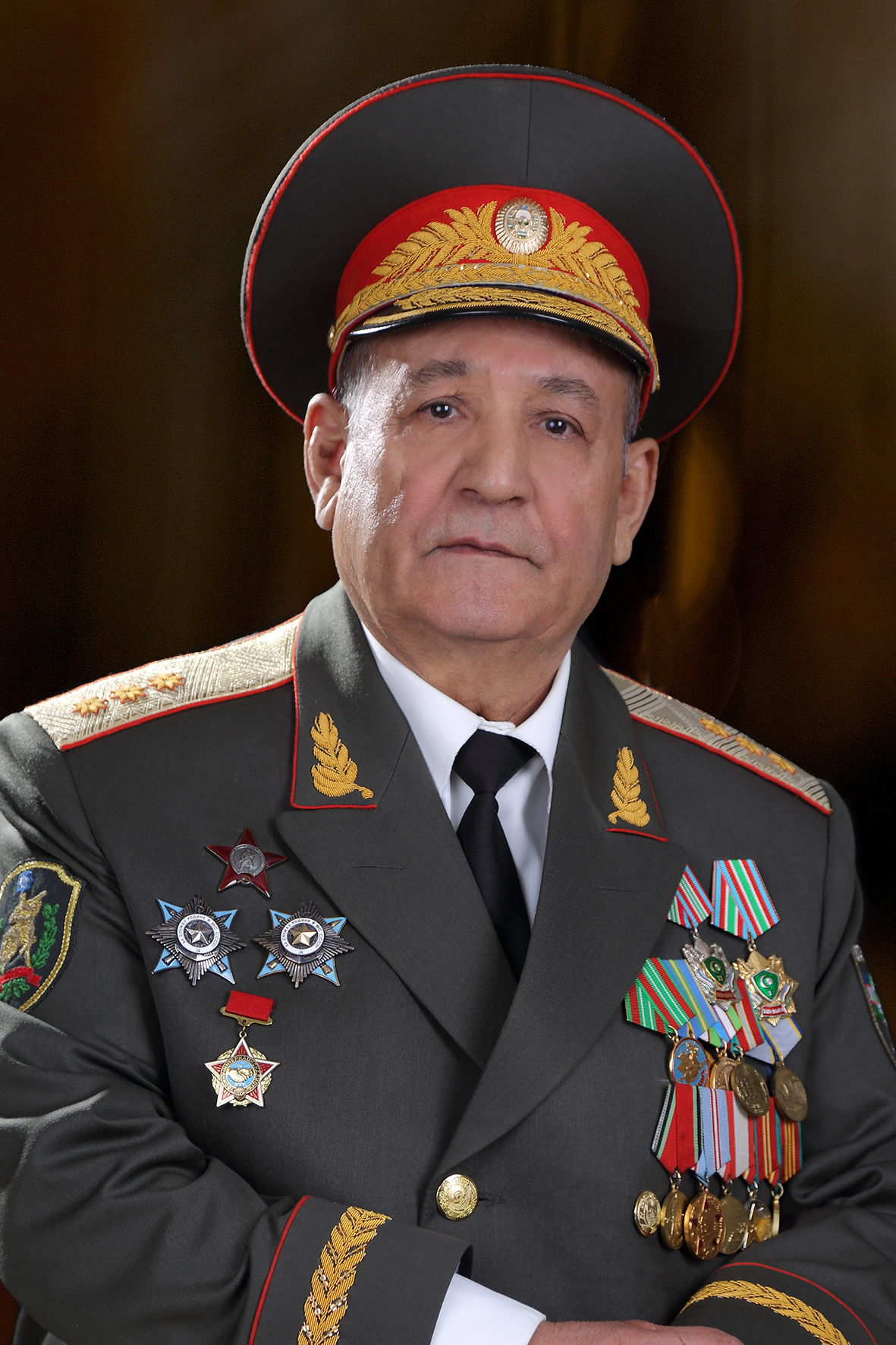

Chief of the Joint Headquarters of the Armed Forces
- In office September 2000 – July 2003
- President: Islam Karimov
- Preceded by: Post established
- Succeeded by: Ismail Ergashev

Personal details
- Born: 12 November 1945 Jizzakh, Jizzakh Oblast, Uzbek SSR, USSR
- Died: 26 June 2025 (aged 79)
- Spouse: Gulchehra Sabitovna Kasymova
- Children: Lola, Zarina, and Jamila

Military service
- Allegiance: Soviet Union; Uzbekistan
- Years of service: 1962–2003
- Rank: Colonel General
- Education: Tashkent Higher Tank Command School

Tulkun Yuldashevich Kasimov (Uzbek: Toʻlqin Yoʻldoshevich Qosimov, Тўлқин Йўлдошевич Қосимов; 12 November 1945 – 26 June 2025) was a Soviet-Uzbek military officer who served as the first person to hold the post of Chief of the Joint Headquarters of the Armed Forces of the Armed Forces of Uzbekistan from 2000 to 2003. After retirement, he served in the reserve of the Armed Forces.

== Background ==
Kasimov was born in the city of Jizzakh in the Uzbek Soviet Socialist Republic in 1945.

In 1962, he joined the Soviet Armed Forces and entered the Tashkent Higher All-Arms Command School. In 1966, he graduated from his studies, receiving the military rank of lieutenant. For active participation in the sports life of the school, good studies, he got the opportunity to choose a place of service. He was sent to the Group of Soviet Forces in Germany as the commander of the motorized rifle platoon. After 2 years he was promoted to the position of company commander. In 1972, he was sent to the North Caucasian Military District as battalion commander and a year later he went to the Frunze Military Academy in Moscow.

After he successfully completed his studies in 1976, he was sent as first deputy regimental commander to the city of Kyzyl-Arbat in Turkmenistan, In November 1978, by order of the Ministry of Defense, he was appointed commander of a motorized rifle regiment of the Turkestan Military District in the city of Termez. In April 1979, for the regiment's achievements in combat and political training and the state of military discipline, he was awarded the early military rank of lieutenant colonel.

== War in Afghanistan ==
On 25 December 1979, the 180th Motorized Rifle Regiment, commanded by Lieutenant Colonel Kasymov, ensured the unhindered advance of divisional units by crossing the Amu Darya river at the outset of the Soviet–Afghan War. The regiment successfully completed the assigned task. From February to April 1980, the 180th MRD took part in 20 operations to destroy Mujahideen formations.

== Further military service ==
=== USSR ===
In November 1980, by order of the Ministry of Defense, he was appointed chief of staff of the 108th Motor Rifle Division, which was located in the city of Kabul. In August 1982 he was appointed Commander of the 4th Guards Division in the city of Termez. In October 1984, by a decree of the Cabinet of Ministers of the USSR, he was awarded the military rank of Major General.

In September 1988, he was appointed First Deputy Commander of the 31st Army Corps of the city of Kutaisi (Georgian SSR) in the area of responsibility of the Transcaucasian Military District.

=== Uzbekistan ===
The former 40th Army, which was withdrawn from Afghanistan in February 1989, was stationed in the city of Samarkand and renamed the 1st Army Corps. In March 1992, he was appointed commander of the 1st Army Corps. In March 1996, he was appointed head of the Main Inspectorate of the Armed Forces of the Republic of Uzbekistan. In August 1996, by decree of President Islam Karimov, he was awarded the military rank of Lieutenant General.

In the spring of 1997, Lieutenant General Kasymov was appointed to the post of Deputy Minister of Defense for Combat Training. In the spring of 1998, a decision was made to transform the General Staff of the Ministry of Defense into the General Staff of the Armed Forces, of which Kasymov was appointed Chief in 2000. In addition, he was entrusted with the duties of the head of the military academy. During this period, he cooperated with Esen Topoev of the Kyrgyz army in combating terrorism.

== Later life and death ==
Kasimov retired in 2003 and lived in Tashkent.

Kasimov died on 26 June 2025, at the age of 79.

== Awards ==
- Order of the Red Star (April 1980)
- Order "For Service to the Motherland in the Armed Forces of the USSR" III degree (15 February 1979)
- Order "For Service to the Motherland in the Armed Forces of the USSR" II degree (20 February 1991)
- Order of the Star " III degree" (Afghanistan)
- Shon-Sharaf Order II degree (January 1998)
- Shon-Sharaf Order I degree (August 2001)
- Breastplate "Internationalist Warrior"
