= Kattakurgan training ground =

Military training area in Uzbekistan

Coordinates: 39.629756°N 65.958852°E

The Kattakurgan training ground (Uzbek: Каттақўрғон округ полигони, Kattaqoʻrgʻon okrug poligoni, "Kattakurgan district training ground") is a military training area in Uzbekistan, in the Central Military District. In was officially inaugurated in November 2019, although it was operational at least since 2017, when automated firing range equipment was installed.

It is the largest training ground in the country. Its facilities include a fleet of military vehicles and equipment, classrooms, a medical center, dormitories, a dining hall, a gym, a fitness center, and a cultural center.

== Notable exercises ==
- Birlik-2025
