= Ahangaran =

Ahangaran is the name given to a number of locations around the world. For example, the name can be found in Baghlan Province, Afghanistan and Toshkent Province, Uzbekistan.

== Ahangaran, Tashkent province ==
Akhangaran is located in Tashkent province, which is located in the North-east of the Republic of Uzbekistan. Ahangaran is bordered by two cities known as Almalyk and Angren. Great Silk Road is crossed from this region. There is a river called Angren River, comes from Angren and crosses the Ahangaran.

=== Population ===
The Ahangaran region is multi-ethnic, in particular 70.3% of population composed by Uzbeks, 8.3% - Kazakhs, 6.4% - Russians, 5.3% - Tajiks, 2.3% - Koreans and 7.4% - Kyrgyzs, Uigurs, Tatars, Ukrainians and other representatives of different nations.

=== Agriculture ===
Agriculture is one of the main components of region's economics.

Main resources of agricultural production are crop products – grain, cotton-wool, vegetables, fruits as well as cattle breeding – cattle and small cattle, poultry and fish-breeding.

=== Social-economic development and Industrial potential ===
Gross regional product (GRP) of Akhangaran region was around by 9.1% in 2009. Region's industrial output production capacity is very high due to the plants situated in Akhangaran. One of the biggest plant is Akhangaran is JSC Ahangarancement/

pen Joint Stock Company "Ahangarancement" is located in the industrial area of Ahangaran Tashkent region, 50 kilometers from the capital of the Republic of Uzbekistan, Tashkent. The company is one of the largest plants of the republic for the production of cement. It is put into operation and start producing products with December 27, 1961. In 1994, the company was transformed into a public company. It employs about 2,000 workers, employees and technical staff. The main production units of the company are: - Mining complex, including limestone mining plant and workshop production of loess; - Preparation shop raw sludge; - Kiln clinker; - Section of cement; - Silos for storage of cement and cement packing plant in bags.

The company has more than 20 service shops and offices to ensure proper functioning. The company includes its own railway station, car enterprise, repair and lining company management and capital construction. The company's products are of high quality and in demand in the domestic and foreign markets. The company's products are exported to the neighboring countries of Central Asia - Kazakhstan, Turkmenistan, Tajikistan and Afghanistan. The company has implemented a quality management system in accordance with international standard ISO 9001:2008. https://web.archive.org/web/20131103235213/http://www.uzsm.uz/en/predpriyatiya/enterprises-cement-industry/ahangarancement.html

== Ahangaran, Afghanistan ==
=== Larger Ahangaran ===
Ahangaran Āhangarān
- Location in Afghanistan
- Coordinates: 35°36′50″N 69°29′30″E
- Country: Afghanistan
- Province: Baghlan Province

The first of these is a group of villages in Baghlan Province. It is located about ten miles northeast of Kala Banu. As of the turn of the 20th century, there were about 40 houses of Pashai in the area.

=== Smaller Ahangaran ===
Ahangaran Āhangarān
- Location in Afghanistan
- Coordinates: 35°31′29″N 68°5′34″E
- Country: Afghanistan
- Province: Baghlan Province

The other Ahangaran is a smaller village, encompassing 12 houses at the turn of the 20th century, in the Kelas Dara, about 42 miles southwest of Dahana-i-Ghori. The inhabitants at the time were members of the Hazara people.

== Pre Islamic ==
Ahangaran is the site of a significant early Buddhist monastery.

The literary and epigraphic evidence about the character of Buddhism is corroborated by the fact that certain present day place names are derived from Hinanyanic terms. The names of cave monasteries of Ahangaran in the Foladi valley and Samangan (Haibak) are traced to arahantanam -place of arahant is (Hinayana saint) and sramanagrama -the habitation of sramanas, (Hinanyana novices). Likewise Shotorak near Bagram having the remnants of a monastic complex is derived from sthaviraka belonging to sthavira the appellation of Hinanayana monks

Ahangaran exists up to this day. Its relics are located along the banks of the Hari Rud, south of Kasi

== See also ==
- Hari River, Afghanistan
- Baghlan Province
