= Uzbekistan National Guard =

Paramilitary body in Uzbekistan

National Guard of the Republic of Uzbekistan Özbekiston Respublikasi milliy gvardiyasi
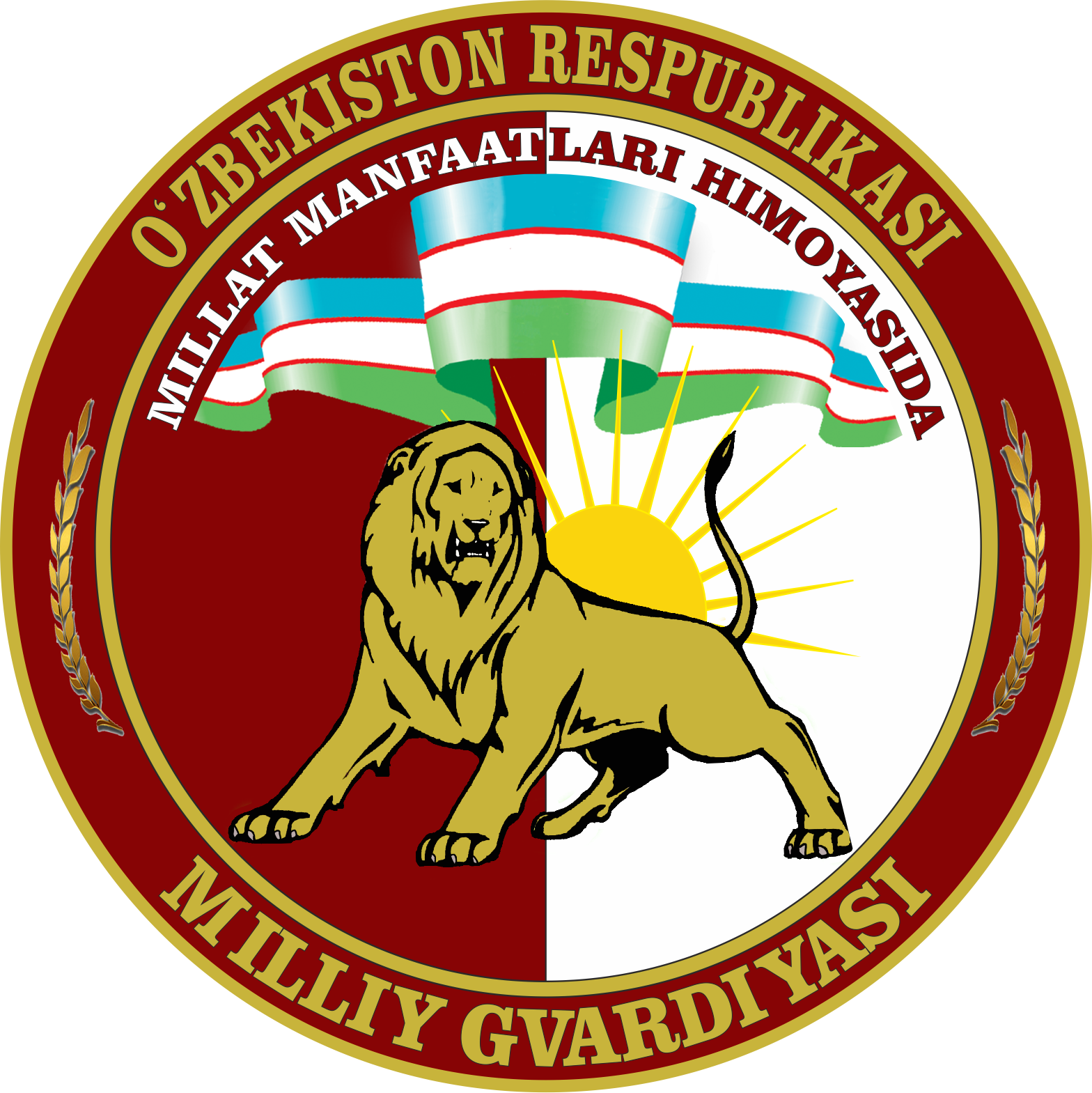
- Emblem

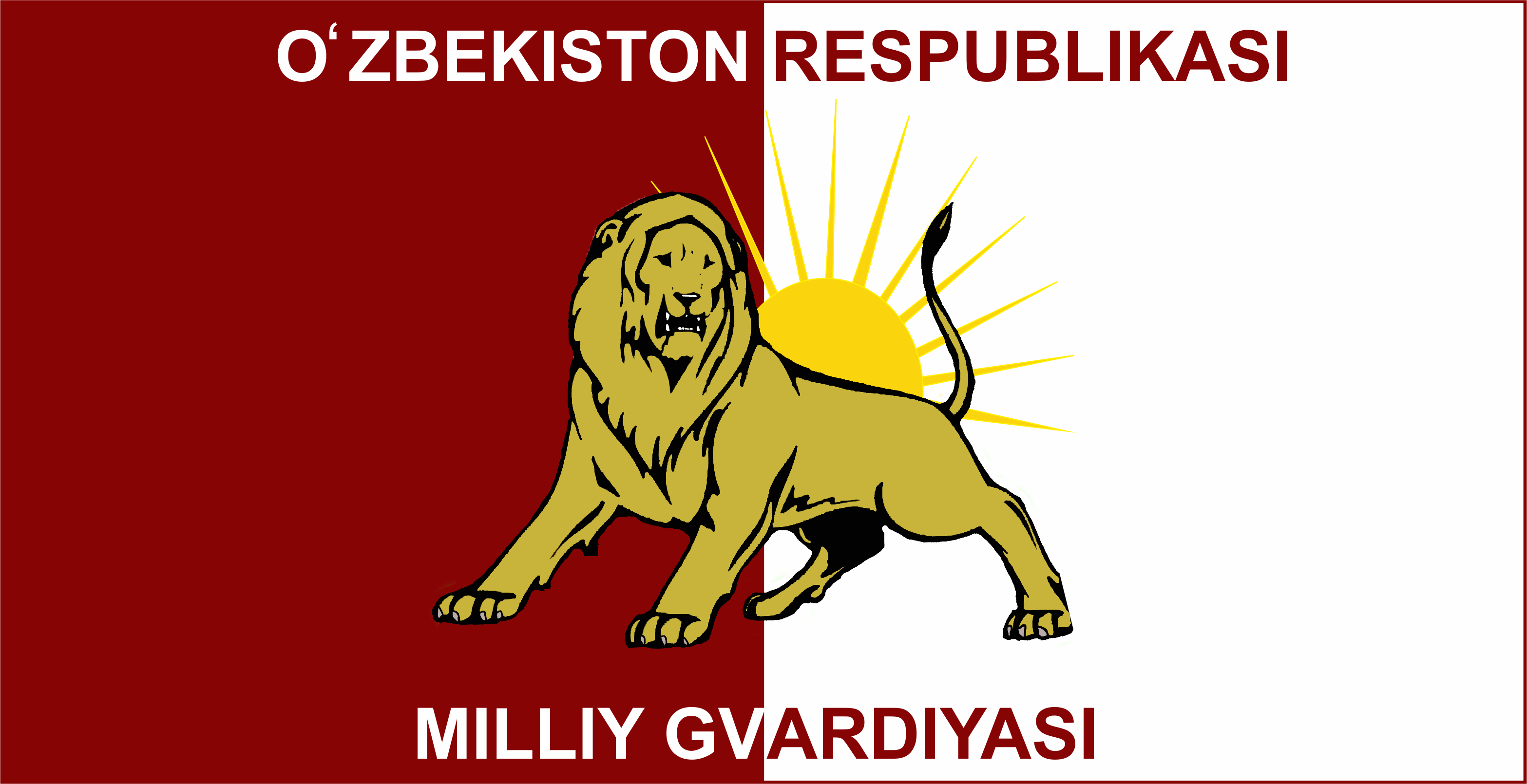
- Flag

Agency overview
- Employees: 30,000 guardsmen

Jurisdictional structure
- Operations jurisdiction: Uzbekistan
- Constituting instrument: Constitution of Uzbekistan

Operational structure
- Agency executive: Colonel General Bakhodir Tashmatov, Commander

Website
- https://milliygvardiya.uz/oz

The National Guard of the Republic of Uzbekistan (Uzbek: Özbekiston Respublikasi milliy gvardiyasi) is a uniformed independent formation within the Armed Forces of the Republic of Uzbekistan. The headquarters of the National Guard is based in Tashkent, where most of the 30,000 soldiers that make up the force are located. As of 2026, the individual in charge of the UNG is currently Colonel General Bakhodir Tashmatov (former Chief of the Joint Staff) and Botir Tursunov (former deputy director of the Institute for Strategic and Regional Studies).

== History ==
=== Soviet era ===
The activity of the internal troops in Uzbekistan dates back precisely to 1918, when Alexander Malkov, a fluent Uzbek speaker, was elected the first People's Commissar of Internal Affairs of the Turkestan Republic.

Military units belonging to the internal troops rendered great assistance to the Red Army during the Russian Civil War and subsequently in the restoration of the national economy.

In 1925-1927, the first Minister of Internal Affairs of the Uzbek SSR, Yuldash Bobojonov, and the chairman of the People's Committee of Internal Affairs, Bobobek Mavlyanbekov, carried out fruitful work to develop the activities of the internal affairs bodies and internal troops of Uzbekistan. In August 1934, the number of security troops in the internal troops was increased to 20,000. Following World War Two and during the Cold War. The personnel of the units took a direct part in the work on the organization and restoration of the industry of Uzbekistan, at production facilities, in the fulfillment of tasks for the protection of special personnel, as well as in the construction of objects of the national economy, such new cities as Navoi, Uchkuduk, Zarafshan, Karshi, Bekobod, Chirchik, Karaulbazar.

=== Independence ===
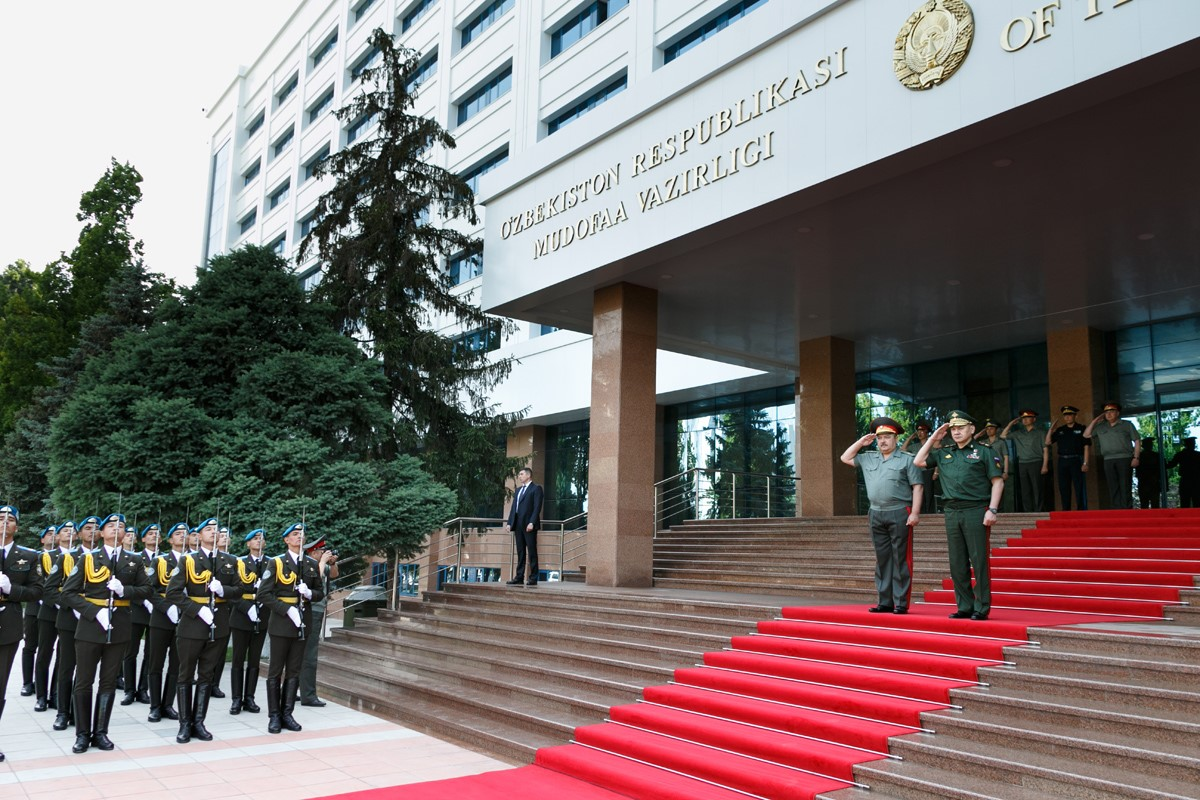
National guard troops during the visit by the Minister of Defense of the Russian Federation in May 2018

It was founded on 30 January 1992 in Tashkent on the basis of the Military Unit No. 3408 and as the direct successor to the Internal Troops of the Uzbek SSR.

By the decree on September 10, 1991, it was established that the Minister of Defense of the Republic of Uzbekistan is simultaneously appointed the Commander of the National guard.

== Modern guard ==
In August 2017, President Shavkat Mirziyoyev issued a presidential decree which effectively removed the National Guard as one of the military's branches of service and made it an independent institution. It was transferred to the Defense Ministry's control the following January. In July 2019, the government amended its criminal code, giving the UNG the expanded authority to conduct pretrial investigations and detain people and hold suspects at the local headquarters. Some analysts have theorized that this expansion of authority may be an attempt to sideline the National Security Service (SNB), which was largely seen as being loyal to former president Islam Karimov.

== Commanders ==
No.	Image	Name	Term Start	Term End	President	Note
1		Bakhodir Tashmatov	August 5, 2017	March 16, 2020	Shavkat Mirziyoyev	
2		Rustam Juraev	March 16, 2020	January 28, 2026	Shavkat Mirziyoyev	
3		Bakhodir Tashmatov	January 28, 2026	Present	Shavkat Mirziyoyev	

== Mandate ==
The main purpose of the National Guard is to protect the sovereignty and territorial integrity of Uzbekistan and the constitutional rights and freedoms of citizens. In fulfilling its purpose, it guards important strategic bases and facilities, as well as important Uzbek officials. It mainly specializes in operations involving small alleys and street fighting. In its early years, it was effectively serving as the personal secret service to President Islam Karimov, often being seen along the road when he was driven from his residence to the Ok Saroy Presidential Palace.

After President Shavkat Mirziyoyev came to the presidency in 2016, the national guard has re-emerged as a law and order body, with Mirziyoyev delegating the role of combating domestic terrorism to the agency. It is given assistance by similar institutions of its neighbors, including the Russian Rosgvardia and the Chinese People's Armed Police.

== Leadership ==
It has the following management structure:

- Commandant of the National Guard – Colonel General Bakhodir Tashmatov
- First Deputy Commandant of the National Guard – Bekmurod Abdullayev
- Deputy Commandant of the National Guard – Sarvar Mamayusupov
- Deputy Commandant of the National Guard – Mamirjon Ganiyeb

== Components ==
=== Directorates ===
In July 2019, the National Guard HQ Directorate and its territorial units, which were previously part of the Ministry of Internal Affairs, were transferred to the National Guard:

- National Guard HQ Directorate (Tashkent)
- Andijon Directorate
- Bukhara Directorate
- Fergana Directorate
- Jizzakh Directorate
- Namangan Directorate
- Navoiy Directorate
- Qashqadaryo Directorate
- Samarqand Directorate
- Sirdaryo Directorate
- Surxondaryo Directorate
- Tashkent Directorate
- Xorazm Directorate
- Karakalpakstan Directorate

An advisory council is formed under the head of the Main Directorate of Security, consisting of 7–9 experienced employees of the directorate and other divisions of the security service, as well as scientists with scientific potential in the relevant field. The composition of the Council is approved annually by the head of the directorate, who is ex officio the chairman of the Council.

=== Individual units ===
The more notable units include the following:

- Ceremonial Company
- Special Forces Regiment
- Motorized Rifle Regiment
- Exemplary Military Band
- Equestrian Squadron of the National Guard
- Society of Physical Culture and Sports "Dynamo"

The ceremonial company of the Uzbek National Guard guarded the body of the late Uzbek president Islam Karimov after his death in September 2016.

=== Educational institutions ===
- Military-Technical Institute of the National Guard
- Republican Specialized Academic Lyceum of Music of the National Guard
- Tashkent Military Academic Lyceum

==== Institute ====
The Military-Technical Institute of the National Guard serves as the main military academy for national guard troops. The Tashkent Higher Military Technical School of the Ministry of Internal Affairs was established on the basis of the Higher Courses of the Ministry of Internal Affairs (military unit 5375). On January 10, 1992, it was transferred to the jurisdiction of the system of the Ministry of Internal Affairs. The university first accepted cadets in 1991 and in 1995 prepared the first graduates. In 2017, it was transferred to the National Guard.

==== Republican Specialized Academic Lyceum of Music ====
Like the Moscow Military Music College in Russia, the Republican Specialized Academic Lyceum of Music of the National Guard is a youth institution dedicated to musical education. Founded in 1944, provides special military training for musicians in their youth aged 14 to 18. After 12 years of existence in 1956, it was renamed the Republican Boarding School. It gained its current name in 2011. In 2019, the Brass Band of the lyceum took part in the events surrounding the Spasskaya Tower Military Music Festival and Tattoo in Moscow.

== See also ==
- Azerbaijani National Guard
- National Guard (Kyrgyzstan)
- National Guard of Kazakhstan
- Turkmen National Guard
- Presidential National Guard
