= Uzbekistan Air and Air Defence Forces =

Air warfare branch of the Uzbekistan military

Uzbek Air Defence Forces and Air Force
- Havo hujumidan mudofaa qöşinlari va Harbiy havo kuçlari
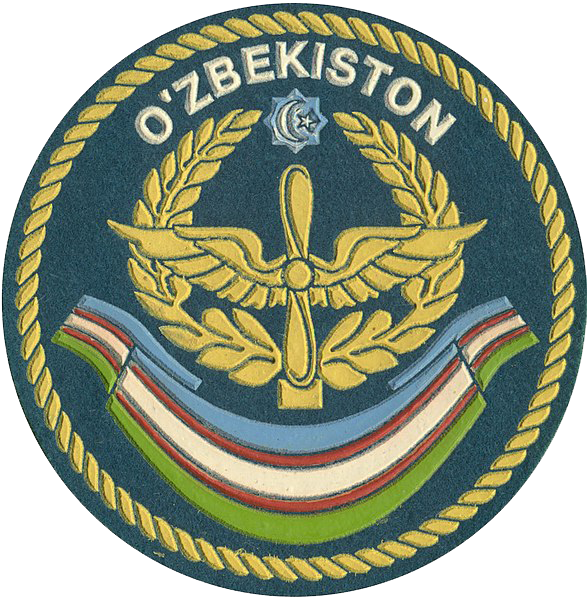
- Uzbekistan Air Force emblem
- Founded: 1992; 34 years ago
- Country: Uzbekistan
- Type: Air force
- Role: Aerial warfare Aerial defence
- Size: 15,000 personnel
- Part of: Uzbek Armed Forces
- Headquarters: Tashkent
- Anniversaries: Third Sunday of August (Air Force Day)
- Engagements: Tajik Civil War; Batken Conflict

Commanders
- Commander of the Air Defence Forces: Major General Akhmad Burkhanov
- Notable commanders: Major General Abdulla Xolmuhamedov

Insignia
- Roundel

- Fin flash

- Flag

Aircraft flown
- Attack: Su-25
- Fighter: MiG-29, J-10C, Su-30SM
- Helicopter: Mi-8, Eurocopter Fennec, Eurocopter Super Puma
- Attack helicopter: Mi-24, Mi-35M
- Trainer: Aero L-39 Albatros
- Transport: Ilyushin Il-76, An-12, An-26

The Uzbek Air Defence Forces and the Air Force (Uzbek: Havo hujumidan mudofaa qöşinlari va Harbiy havo kuçlari) are the aerial branch of the Armed Forces of the Republic of Uzbekistan. They were formed following the dissolution of the Soviet Union in 1991, with the modern structure officially established in 1992. The force is responsible for aerial warfare, air defence operations, and protection of Uzbekistan’s airspace. It operates under the Ministry of Defence. As of 2025–2026 estimates, the Air and Air Defence Forces consist of approximately 15,000 personnel, forming part of Uzbekistan’s total active armed forces of around 120,000 troops. According to the 2026 Global Firepower index, the Uzbek Air Force is reported to be the strongest in Central Asia.

== History ==
After the collapse of the Soviet Union, in accordance with a decree of the President of Uzbekistan on 13 July 1992, former Soviet Air Force units stationed on Uzbek territory from the 73rd Air Army of the Turkestan Military District headquartered at Tashkent were taken over by Uzbekistan. The takeover of Soviet Air Defence Forces units from the 15th Air Defence Division at Samarkand followed on 12 November. By late 1992, the Uzbek units suffered from a shortage of officers since many had left for their national armed forces. This trend was exemplified by the 396th Separate Guards Helicopter Regiment at Kogon, who staged a three-day strike in February 1992 when they were informed of their transfer to the Uzbekistan National Guard. This ended when the Uzbek Minister of Defence intervened and allowed the mostly Russian personnel of the regiment to find new positions, resulting in the departure of over 90% of its officers and warrant officers for Russia. On the first day of 1993, in accordance with a directive of the General Staff of Uzbekistan issued on 3 November 1992, the headquarters of the Uzbek Air Force was formed from the aviation department of the Uzbek Ministry of Defence, created by that time, and the disbanded headquarters of the 73rd Air Army.

Initially, personnel of Slavic nationalities were allowed to depart freely and not pressured into taking the oath of allegiance to Uzbekistan or signing service contracts with their armed forces, which allowed the fledgling air force to gain experience, but once they left, the Uzbek Air Forces experienced a sharp decline in experienced pilots and maintenance personnel and a reduction to minimum numbers of serviceable aircraft. Another problem was a lack of Aero L-39 trainer aircraft inherited from the Soviet Union, resulting in the purchase of fifteen of them from Kyrgyzstan between 1994 and 1996.

During the Tajik civil war from September 1992 to May 1993, the Tajikistan government was supported by Uzbekistan. Helicopters of the Air Force fought the Islamist rebels at a United Tajik Opposition base. Later, the Uzbek Air Force was said to have destroyed the last holdouts of rebels in eastern Tajikistan. Units involved were the helicopter regiments at Chirchiq and Kogon, the fighter-bomber regiments at Dzhizak and Kakaydy, and the separate mixed aviation regiment at Tashkent Vostochny, operating MiG-29s, Su-17M, Su-24, Su-25 and Mi-8 and Mi-24 helicopters. During the war, the Uzbek Air Force lost one Su-24, two Mi-8 and a single Mi-24.

In March 1994, the Russian Federation signed a treaty with Uzbekistan in training of pilots. The Uzbek Air Force is assisted by the Russian Air Force, though the Jizzakh Higher Military Aviation School was opened to train Uzbeks. As of that year, some thirteen airbases were active in Uzbekistan. The Air Force was to follow the Soviet doctrine, supported by the Uzbekistan Ground Forces.

Beginning in the mid-1990s, de-Russification policies were pursued in Uzbekistan, which impacted the Armed Forces by the calling up of Uzbek officers from the reserves to replace officers of Slavic nationalities in command positions. As a result, the percentage of Uzbek officers in the Armed Forces increased from 50 percent to 85 percent, but these actions reduced the capabilities of the armed forces. At the same time, the air force was reorganize to consolidate units: in 1993 the 87th Separate Reconnaissance Aviation Regiment (Su-24MR) was combined with the 735th Bomber Aviation Regiment (Su-24) to form the 60th Bomber Aviation Regiment at Karshi-Khanabad Air Base, while the 136th Fighter-Bomber Aviation Regiment (Andijan) and the 372nd Separate Instructor Assault Aviation Squadron (Chirchiq) were combined into the 59th Fighter-Bomber Aviation Regiment at Chirchiq. During the same year, the 111th Separate Mixed Aviation Regiment (Tashkent-Vostochny) was reduced to a separate transport aviation squadron, with some aircraft transferred to the 194th Guards Military Transport Aviation Regiment, and its Mi-8s to the helicopter regiments. The An-12s and Tu-134s remained at Tashkent-Vostochny.

1994 brought the renumbering of the 396th Separate Guards Helicopter Regiment (Kogan) as the 65th (Mi-8 and Mi-6), the 399th Separate Helicopter Regiment (Chirchiq) as the 66th (Mi-8, Mi-24, and Mi-26), the 9th Guards Fighter Aviation Regiment (Andizhan) as the 62nd Fighter Aviation Regiment (Su-27), and the 115th Guards Fighter Aviation Regiment (Kakaydy) as the 61st (MiG-29). Meanwhile, the 287th Separate Test Aviation Squadron at Nukus was withdrawn to Russia in 1993. Following the example of other post-Soviet countries, the merger of the Uzbek Air Force and the Uzbek Air Defence Forces to form the Air and Air Defence Forces of Uzbekistan was directed on 15 January 1999. The process was difficult and only from 2001 did the percentage of serviceable aircraft begin to rise and pilot flight hours increase. Due to the merger and the decreasing serviceability of Uzbek aircraft, the 60th Bomber Aviation Regiment and the 61st and 62nd Fighter Aviation Regiments were consolidated into the 60th Mixed Aviation Brigade at Karshi-Khanabad in 1999. However, this did not prevent more aircraft from becoming unflyable.

The Uzbek Air Force saw further combat between July and September 1999 in the Batken Conflict when Islamist militants of the Islamic Movement of Uzbekistan (IMU) attempted to enter Uzbek territory from Tajikistan through Kyrgyzstan. Su-17s, Su-24s, Mi-8s, and Mi-24s were involved in the fighting, with one of the Su-24s being shot down. The Mi-8s and Mi-24s were involved in the elimination of the militants in November and December of that year, and during August and September 2000 Su-24 and Su-25s were committed to the conflict again, along with the Mi-8s and Mi-24s. During this period, two Mi-8s were lost.

Due to an agreement in the Commonwealth of Independent States, Russia helped maintain the aircraft of the Uzbek Air Force and sold them more aircraft at a cheaper price than to other interests, such as the United States. In Operation Enduring Freedom, the US government and NATO had an aviation company repair much of the Air Force's aircraft, as it was deemed inoperable by them. Russia tried to undermine US efforts to reach out to Uzbekistan, especially at a 2002 conference in Tashkent, where members of various aviation companies were present.

The talks failed, and the Uzbek government had cut off the US aid in the form of helicopter repairs.

A 13 April 2011 decree transferred the helicopters of the Uzbek Air and Air Defence Forces to the Uzbek Ground Forces.

After the 2016 death of longtime dictator Islam Karimov, who had ruled Uzbekistan since its independence, his successor Shavkat Mirziyoyev pursued an increasingly pro-Russian position. This was reflected in renewed Uzbek participation in Joint CIS Air Defense System exercises held at Sary Shagan in September 2019, and the supply of twelve Russian Mi-35M helicopters under a 2018 loan. Uzbekistan has also express interest in the purchase of Sukhoi Su-30SM fighters to replace its aging fighter fleet.

In August 2021, with the Taliban taking control of Afghanistan, a number of former Afghan Air Force EMB 314 Super Tucanos and Cessna 208 aircraft have fled to Uzbekistan, and have now been seen on the runway at Termez Airport. Their current status and condition are unknown. On August 30, 2024, the aircraft in Termez were handed over to the Uzbek Air Force under FMS sales.

Uzbekistan is set to receive deliveries of TAI ANKA combat drones from Turkey within coming days, according to local reports published on January 30, 2025.

== Organization ==
There are two remaining combat units, at Karshi-Khanabad and Dzhizak.

The 60th Separate Mixed Aviation Brigade is the former 735th Bomber Aviation Regiment combined with the former 87th Separate Reconnaissance Aviation Regiment. It has 31 Su-24s, 32 MiG-29s, and 6 Su-27s. Other recently disbanded units include the 61st Fighter Aviation Regiment at Kakaydy, which was itself a merger with the previous 115th Fighter Aviation Regiment, and the 62nd Fighter Aviation Regiment at Andijan. Regiments at both bases were disbanded in 1999. As many as 26 stored Su-17s, apparently in very bad condition, remain at Chirchiq (see Google Earth 41°30'05.69"N 69°33'44.90"E).

=== List of units ===
- 60th Separate Mixed Aviation Brigade (Karshi-Khanabad)
- Separate Mixed Aviation Brigade (Dzhizak)
- Separate Mixed Aviation Regiment (Fergana)
- Separate Mixed Aviation Squadron (Tashkent)
- 65th Separate Helicopter Regiment (Kagan and Bukhara)
- 66th Separate Helicopter Regiment (Chirchiq)
- 12th Anti-Aircraft Rocket Brigade
- Radio-Technical Brigade

== Aircraft ==
=== Current inventory ===
Aircraft	Origin	Type	Variant	In service	Notes
Combat aircraft (including UCAVs)
Sukhoi Su-30	Soviet Union	Multirole	Su-30SM	?,	
Chengdu J-10	China	Multirole	J-10CE	6+	At least six were shown during the Independence Day Ceremony of Uzbekistan on August 28, 2026.
Mikoyan MiG-29	Soviet Union	Multirole	MiG-29A	26	To be phased-out
Sukhoi Su-25	Soviet Union	Attack	Su-25, Su-25UB, Su-25BM	13	
Bayraktar TB2	Turkey	MALE UCAV		4+	On order
TAI ANKA	Turkey	MALE UCAV	Anka-S	3	On order
TAI Aksungur	Turkey	MALE UCAV		Undisclosed	On order
Wing Loong	China	MALE UCAV	Wing Loong I	5	On order
Transport
Antonov An-12	Soviet Union	Transport		2	
Antonov An-26	Soviet Union	Transport		4	
EADS CASA C-295	Spain	Transport		4	
Embraer C-390 Millennium	Brazil	Transport		1	2 ordered. The specific airframes are a part of an overrun from the Brazilian Air Force contract.
Ilyushin Il-76	Soviet Union	Transport		2	
Helicopters
Eurocopter AS532	France	Transport / Utility		16	
Eurocopter AS550	France	Light utility		20	
Mil Mi-8	Soviet Union	Utility	Mi-8/17	60+	
Mil Mi-24	Russia	Attack	Mi-35M	41+	4 on order
Trainer aircraft
Aero L-39 Albatros	Czechoslovakia	Jet trainer	L-39C	14+	
PAC MFI-17 Mushshak	Pakistan	Trainer aircraft		16+	
Mikoyan MiG-29	Soviet Union	Jet trainer	MiG-29UB	5	

== Training ==
The main aviation training establishment is the Higher Military Aviation School of the Republic of Uzbekistan. The school was opened in 1994 as the Jizzakh Higher Military Aviation School at Jizzakh, but relocated to Karshi Khanabad in 2018, being accordingly renamed. In September 2019, the Thales Group provided a flight simulator to the Uzbek Air Force, marking the introduction of the first Air Force academy in the country. The academy provides training for Uzbek pilots and engineers, with a capacity of 300 students.

== Service-wide events ==
The official holiday of the Air Defence Forces is Air Force Day on the third Sunday of August. It was established by decree of President Islam Karimov on 21 July 1995. The Ministry of Defense organizes a number of events, including a wreath laying ceremony to honor pilots who died in the line of duty. A flypast is also organized. On 18 June 2019, celebrations were held on the occasion of the 70th anniversary of an air force unit located in Qashqadaryo Region [appears to be 70th anniversary of 735th Bomber Aviation Regiment now 60th Mixed Aviation Brigade], which included pilots performed an "air dance" in the sky on MiG-29s and Su-25, demonstrating their aerobatic skills.

On Victory Day (9 May) in 2019, Major General Akhmad Burkhanov led an air force delegation that congratulated veterans of the Second World War and delivered a larger holiday stipend of behalf of the President of Uzbekistan.

== Ranks ==
=== Commissioned officer ranks ===
The rank insignia of commissioned officers.

Rank group	General / flag officers			Senior officers			Junior officers
Uzbekistan Air and Air Defence Forces
Uzbekistan Air and Air Defence Forces	General-polkovnik	General-leytenant	General-mayor	Polkovnik	Podpolkovnik	Mayor	Kapitan	Katta leytenant	Leytenant

=== Other ranks ===
The rank insignia of non-commissioned officers and enlisted personnel.

Rank group	Senior NCOs					Junior NCOs	Enlisted
Uzbek Air Defense Forces and Air Force
Uzbek Air Defense Forces and Air Force	Katta serjant	I darajali serjant	II darajali serjant	III darajali serjant	Kichik serjant		Oddiy askar
