= Tomb of the Unknown Soldier =

Monument commemorating fallen soldiers

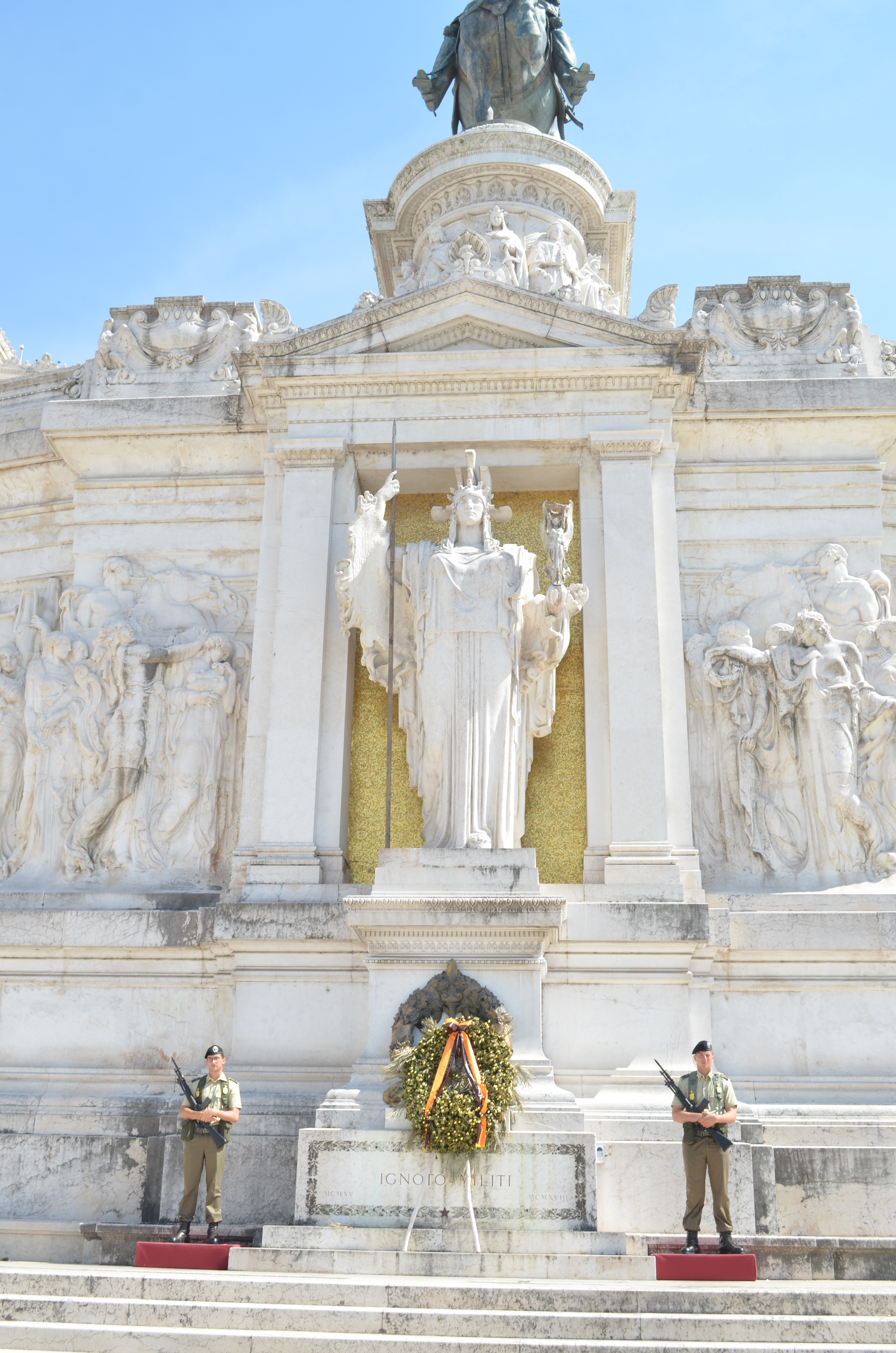
Tomb of the Unknown Soldier, Italy, under the statue of goddess Roma, at Altare della Patria, Rome

A Tomb of the Unknown Soldier or Tomb of the Unknown Warrior is a monument dedicated to the services of an unknown soldier and the common memories of all soldiers killed in war. Such tombs are located in many nations and are usually high-profile national monuments. Throughout history, many soldiers have died in war with their remains being unidentified. Following World War I, a movement arose to commemorate these soldiers with a single tomb, containing the body of one such unidentified soldier.

== History ==
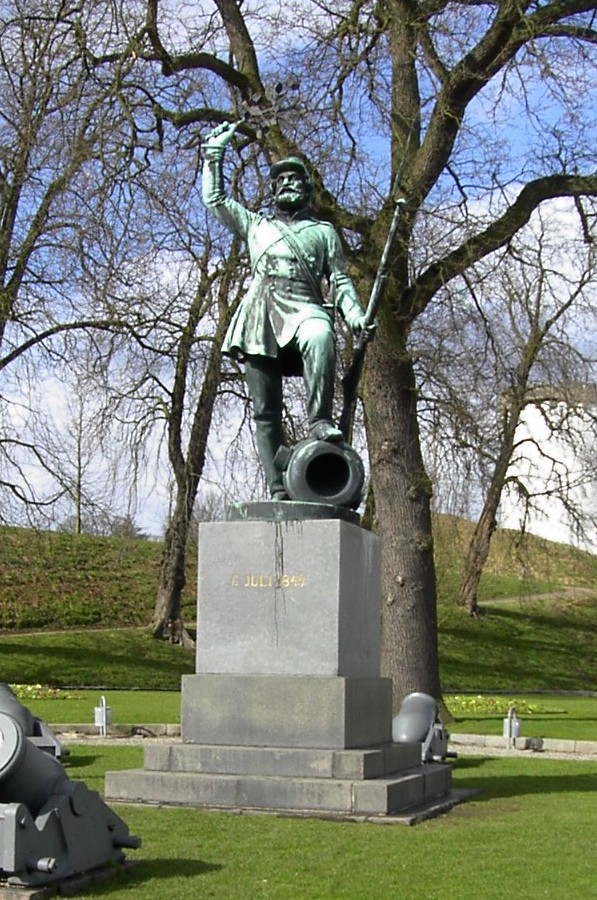
The statue Landsoldaten, Fredericia, Denmark

A shrine in Jinju, Korea, which commemorated those who died in defense of Korea during the Imjin War in 1592, has been described as the first Tomb of the Unknown Soldier. It is, however, more inclusive, in that it is a memorial to all who died in defense of the city against the forces of Toyotomi Hideyoshi, civilian as well as soldier. Beginning in 1593, when the Ministry of Rites received permission to perform a sacrifice for all who died in the battle, not only the identifiable bodies, the state offered sacrifices for the dead twice a year in spring and autumn until 1908, when the practice, under pressure by the Japanese governor-general, was ended by royal edict.

The first known monument of an unknown soldier in Europe is the Landsoldaten ('Valiant Soldier Square') created in 1849 to commemorate the First Schleswig War, in Fredericia, Denmark.

=== France and the United Kingdom ===
During the First World War, the British and French armies, who were allies during the war, jointly decided to bury soldiers themselves. In the UK, under the Imperial War Graves Commission (now Commonwealth War Graves Commission), the Reverend David Railton had seen a grave marked by a rough cross while serving in the British Army as a chaplain on the Western Front, which bore the pencil-written legend "An Unknown British Soldier".

He suggested (together with the French in their own country) the creation at a national level of a symbolic funeral and burial of an "Unknown Warrior", proposing that the grave should in the UK include a national monument in the form of what is usually, but not in this particular case, a headstone. The idea received the support of the Dean of Westminster Herbert Edward Ryle, the Prime Minister David Lloyd George, and later King George V, responding to a wave of public support. At the same time, a similar concern grew in France. In November 1916, a local officer of Le Souvenir français proposed the idea of burying "an unknown soldier" in the Panthéon. A formal bill was presented in Parliament in November 1918. The decision was voted into law in September 1919.

The United Kingdom and France conducted services connected with their 'monumental' graves (as presumably newly conceived, and in any case approved, by their respective armies) on Armistice Day 1920 (the burial itself taking place later in January of the following year in France). In the UK, the Tomb of the Unknown Warrior was created at Westminster Abbey, while in France the Tombe du Soldat inconnu was placed beneath the Arc de Triomphe.

=== Other countries ===
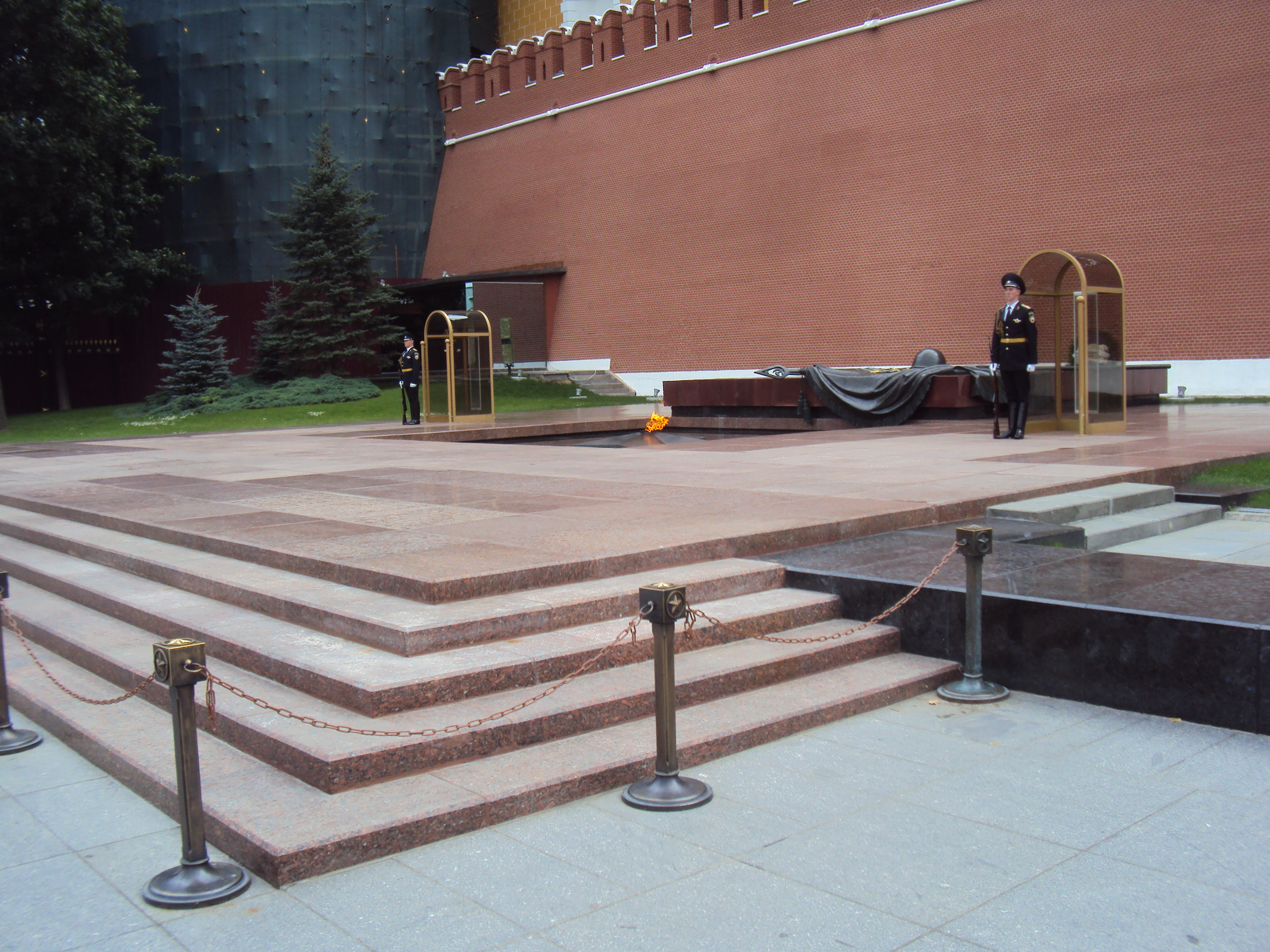
The Tomb of the Unknown Soldier, Moscow

The idea of a symbolic Tomb of the Unknown Soldier then spread to other countries. In 1921, the United States unveiled its own Tomb of the Unknown Soldier, Portugal its Túmulo do Soldado Desconhecido, and Italy its Tomba del Milite Ignoto. Australia has entombed an Unknown Soldier as a key focus point of a broader Australian National War Memorial, a museum dedicated to sacrifice in war and avoiding it by peace.

Other nations have followed the practice and created their own tombs. In Chile and Ukraine, the second 'unknown tombs' were unveiled to commemorate The Unknown Sailor. In Serbia, soldiers of World War I are commemorated by the Monument to the Unknown Hero on the mountain of Avala. In the Philippines, the Tomb of the Unknown Soldier at the Libingan ng mga Bayani ("Cemetery of the Heroes") is the cemetery's most prominent structure.

== Symbolism ==
The Tombs of the Unknown Soldiers typically contain the remains of a soldier who is unidentified (or "known but to God" as the stone is sometimes inscribed). These remains are considered impossible to identify, and so serve as a symbol for all of a country's unknown dead wherever they fell in the war being remembered. The anonymity of the entombed soldier is the key symbolism of the monument; it could be the tomb of anyone who fell in service of the nation, and therefore serves as a monument symbolizing all of the sacrifices.

== Identification ==
Many unknown soldiers have later been identified by DNA analysis. The first to be analyzed was an airman from the Vietnam War.

== Examples ==
Tombs of the Unknown Soldiers from around the world and various wars include the following:

Country	Monument	Location	Image	Description
Albania	Statue of the Unknown Soldier	Tirana		Built to commemorate soldiers who died during the Second World War
Argentina	Metropolitan Cathedral	Buenos Aires		Tomb of the Unknown Soldier of the Argentine War of Independence
Argentina	National Flag Memorial	Rosario		Tomb of the Unknown Soldier
Angola	Tomb of the Unknown Soldier at Luanda	Luanda		Monument of the Unknown Soldier in Luanda, Angola
Armenia	Tomb of the Unknown Soldier at Victory Park	Yerevan		Tomb of the Unknown Soldier; commemorates the victory of the Soviet Union in World War II
Australia	Australian War Memorial	Canberra		The tomb of the Unknown Australian Soldier at the Australian War Memorial in Canberra.
Austria	Outer Palace Gate at the Heldenplatz	Vienna		Within the 1818 neo-classical gateway to the Hofburg, the former Imperial Palace.
Bangladesh	Jatiyo Smriti Soudho	Savar Upazila		Jatiyo Sriti Shoudhor National Martyrs' Memorial is the national monument of Bangladesh for those who gave their lives in the Bangladesh Liberation War of 1971, many of whom were buried in mass graves in that park. The monument is located in Savar, about 35 km north-west of the capital, Dhaka. It was designed by Syed Mainul Hossain.
Bangladesh	Shikha Onirban or 'Eternal Flame'	Dhaka		Shikha Onirban was built to commemorate the valour and the sacrifices of Bangladesh Armed Forces Soldiers died in the Bangladesh Liberation War in 1971.
Belgium	Congress Column	Brussels		The Tomb of the Unknown Soldier at the base of the location.
Bolivia	Monumento al Soldado Desconocido	La Paz		The Tomb of the Unknown Soldier, center piece of the location.
Brazil	Monument to the dead of World War II, Flamengo Park	Rio de Janeiro		The Tomb of the Unknown Soldier on the monument's platform.
Brazil	Brazilian Monument and Tomb of the Unknown Soldier of World War II	Pistoia, Italy		Votive Tomb of the Unknown Soldier, with monument pavilion.
Bulgaria	Monument to the Unknown Soldier	Sofia		monument built in memory to soldiers who died in the Russo-Turkish War, also contains soil from Stara Zagora and the Battle of Shipka Pass
Bulgaria	Monument to the Unknown Soldier	Haskovo		
Canada	Tomb of the Unknown Soldier at the National War Memorial	Ottawa		The tomb is located next to the National War Memorial in Confederation Square in Ottawa. It contains the remains of a Canadian soldier from World War I, who was buried near Vimy Ridge.
Canada	Tomb of the Unknown Soldier at the National War Memorial (Note: During WWI, Newfoundland was a separate Dominion within the British Empire.)	St. John's		The tomb is located at the National War Memorial in St. John's. It contains the remains of a Royal Newfoundland Regiment soldier from World War I, who was repatriated from Beaumont-Hamel.
Chile	General Manuel Baquedano Square	Santiago		Contains the remains of a soldier who died in 1881 during the War of the Pacific.
Chile	Plaza de la Ciudadanía (Citizenship Square),	Santiago		Contains the remains of a soldier found in Peru. Died in 1881 during the War of the Pacific.
Chile	Cripta del Morro de Arica (Morro de Arica Crypt),	Arica		Contains the remains of a soldier found in 1998. Died during the War of the Pacific.
Chile	Unknown Sailor Monument			A monument built in honor to the sailors that fought and died in the Battle of Iquique, a naval battle off the coast of Chile.
China	Monument to the People's Heroes	Beijing		A monument (not a tomb or a cenotaph) built in honor to the Chinese heroes died between 1840s (the First Opium War) and 1949 (founding of the People's Republic of China), who have given their lives in the many struggles to resist the enemy, domestic and foreign, to strive for the independence of the nation and the freedom of the people.
Colombia	Plaza y Monumento de los Caídos on Centro Administrativo Nacional	Bogotá	Plaza y Monumento de los Caídos.	
Croatia	Monument to Croatian unknown soldier	Osijek		
Czech Republic	National Monument on Vítkov Hill	Prague		Contains remains of an unknown Czechoslovak soldier fallen at the Battle of Zborov as well as an unknown Czechoslovak soldier fallen at the Battle of Dukla, a part of a larger memorial to all Czechoslovak soldiers.
Dominican Republic	Flag Square of Santo Domingo			The Arc of the Square contains the tomb of an unknown fallen soldier who participated in the Dominican War of Independence.
Egypt	Unknown Soldier Memorial	Cairo		Also includes the tomb of President Anwar Sadat.
Egypt	Alexandria Naval Unknown Soldier Memorial			
Estonia	Defence Forces Cemetery	Tallinn		
Finland	Hietaniemi cemetery	Helsinki		In the centre of the military cemetery are the tombs of the unknown soldier and Marshal Carl Gustaf Emil Mannerheim.
France	Tomb of the Unknown Soldier beneath the Arc de Triomphe	Paris		First Tomb of the Unknown Soldier (with Westminster Abbey in London)
Gambia	Tomb of the Unknown Soldier behind Arch 22	Banjul		
Georgia	Tomb of the Unknown Soldier, Tbilisi			Located in Vake Park
Germany	Unter den Linden	Berlin		An unknown soldier and an unknown victim of a concentration camp are commemorated within a 19th-century guardhouse, the Neue Wache.
Greece	Tomb of the Unknown Soldier on Syntagma Square	Athens		Cenotaph located in front of the Greek Parliament on Syntagma Square in Athens. Two quotations by Thucydides, from Pericles' Funeral Oration, are inscribed on the retaining wall: Μία κλίνη κενὴ φέρεται ἐστρωμένη τῶν ἀφανῶν ("... and one bed is carried empty, made for the unknown ones"), and Ἀνδρῶν ἐπιφανῶν πᾶσα γῆ τάφος ("The whole earth is the burial ground of famous men"). The inscriptions flank a central sculpture in low relief, depicting a dying hoplite. The names of battlefields where Greeks have fought since independence are inscribed on the monument.; The monument is guarded round the clock by the Evzones of the Presidential Guard.
Hungary	Heroes' Square	Budapest		The Memorial Stone of Heroes (Hősök emlékköve) is a low stone cenotaph surrounded by an ornamental iron chain. The cenotaph is dedicated "To the memory of the heroes who gave their lives for the freedom of our people and our national independence."
India	Amar Jawan Jyoti	New Delhi		Burning in a shrine under the arch of India Gate since 1971 is the Amar Jawan Jyoti (the flame of the immortal soldier) which marks the Tomb of the Unknown Soldier. The shrine itself is a black marble cenotaph with a rifle placed on its barrel, crested by a soldier's helmet. Each face of the cenotaph has inscribed in gold the words "Amar Jawan" (Immortal Warrior) in Hindi (Devanagri script). The Prime Minister of India pays homage to the country's fallen soldiers along with the Chiefs of Staff of each arm of the Armed Forces on each Republic Day of India.
Indonesia	Dutch War Cemetery Pandu	Bandung		The Field of Honor is a memorial to the unknown soldier. There is also the Tomb of the Unknown (Dutch) Sailor on Dutch War Cemetery Kembang Kuning in Surabaya.
Iran	Chizar	Tehran		In Iran, unknown soldiers are buried in public places. Chizar is the largest of all.
Iran	Behesht Zahra	Tehran		
Iran	Unknown Soldier Park	Tehran		
Iraq	The Monument to the Unknown Soldier, in Grand Festivities Square	Zawra Park, Baghdad		Three monuments in Zawra Park commemorate Iraq's fallen soldiers; The Monument to the Unknown Soldier (pictured), the Victory Arch (completed in 1989) and the Al-Shaheed Monument (also known as the Martyrs' Monument, completed in 1983). The Monument to the Unknown Soldier was constructed between 1979 and 1982, and replaced an earlier Unknown Soldier's Monument built in 1959 in a different location, but dismantled when the current monument was inaugurated.
Israel	National Memorial Hall For Israel's Fallen, Mount Herzl	Jerusalem		The Eternal Flame Monument to Unknown Soldiers.
Italy	Piazza Venezia	Rome		The Tomb of the Milite Ignoto in the Altare della Patria (Vittoriano).
Japan	Chidorigafuchi National Cemetery	Tokyo		
Japan	Ryozen Kannon	Kyoto		
Japan	Tomb of the Unknown Soldier of the World	Ogose, Saitama		
Japan	Dai Heiwa Kinen Tō	Tondabayashi, Osaka		
Jordan	Tomb of the Unknown Soldier	Amman		Source:
Lebanon	Tomb of the Unknown Soldier in Lebanon	Beirut, Mathaf		The Tomb of the Unknown Soldier in Lebanon represents the forming and independence of the Lebanese Armed Forces from the French Army in 1943. The tomb also commemorates soldiers of the Legion of Orient and the Army of the Levant during the French Mandate of Lebanon from 1920 to 1943. The cenotaph in the middle includes a Cedrus libani tree surrounded by a laurel; the main symbol of Roman Legions. Around the cedar tree and laurel reads in Arabic : "Glory and Immortality for our Martyred Heroes". Behind the cenotaph are original Roman Columns.
Lithuania	Vienybės Square	Kaunas		Tomb of Nežinomas kareivis, with remains of soldiers who died in the Lithuanian-Soviet War in 1919.
Malaysia	National Monument	Kuala Lumpur		Completed in 1966 to commemorate fallen combatants against Japanese occupation of pre-independence Malaysia in World War II and the Malayan National Liberation Army during the Malayan Emergency. Also includes a pre-independence cenotaph, which was shifted from its original location closer to the old town of Kuala Lumpur, commemorating the war dead of World War I, World War II and the Malayan Emergency.
Malta	Monument of Unknown Soldier, Siege Bell War Memorial	Valletta		
Mauritius	Tomb of the Unknown Soldier	Curepipe		
Morocco	Tomb of the Unknown Soldier beneath the Hassan Tower	Rabat		
Namibia	Heroes' Acre	Windhoek		The Tomb of the Unknown Soldier contains soil from Cassinga and Oshatotwa from the Namibian War of Independence.
New Zealand	Tomb of the Unknown Warrior, National War Memorial	Wellington		On 6 November 2004, the remains of an unknown New Zealand soldier were exhumed from the (CWGC) Caterpillar Valley Cemetery, and laid to rest in the Tomb of the Unknown Warrior in Wellington, New Zealand. He represents over 18,000 members of New Zealand forces who lost their lives during the First World War. A special headstone marks his original resting place in Plot 14, Row A, Grave 27.
Nigeria	Tomb of the Unknown Soldier	Eagle Square, Abuja.		Statue of the Unknown Soldier, at the Eagle Square, Abuja, formerly located in Idumota, Lagos as Soldier Idumota, the tomb was relocated to Abuja.
Peru	Plaza Bolivar	Lima		Contains the remains of a soldier who died in 1881 during the War of the Pacific.
Peru	Monument to the Unknown Soldier	Lima		Located at the Morro Solar.
Philippines	Libingan ng mga Bayani	Taguig City		Contains the remains of Filipino soldiers who have joined the military and served on the Philippine Revolution, Philippine–American War and World War II.
Poland	Tomb of the Unknown Soldier, Marshall Józef Piłsudski Square	Warsaw		Constructed as the arcade of Saxon Palace, which was destroyed by the Germans in 1944. Contains the remains of a soldier who died between 1918 and 1920.
Portugal	Tomb of the Unknown Soldier	Batalha Monastery		Housed within the Chapter House of Batalha Monastery. It contains the remains of two unknown World War I soldiers; one from the battlefields of Flanders, and one from the African theater, who were interred on 6 April 1921.
Republic of China	National Revolutionary Martyrs' Shrine	Taipei		Completed in 1969, it is currently the highest-ranking memorial site for national martyrs in the Republic of China, and a representative site for international visitors to pay tribute to the fallen heroes. The enshrinement of martyrs is carried out by a register compiled by the Ministry of National Defense of the Republic of China and approved by the President. The structure houses the spirit tablets of about 390,000 persons killed, among other engagements, during the Xinhai Revolution, Second Revolution, Constitutional Protection Movement, Northern Expedition, Chiang-Gui War, Central Plains War, Second Sino-Japanese War, Chinese Civil War, and the First and Second Taiwan Strait Crises.
Turkey	Çanakkale Martyrs' Memorial	Gallipoli		Erected for the unknown soldiers of the Çanakkale Front during the Battle of Gallipoli during World War I. Opened on 20 August 1960.
Romania	Tomb of the Unknown Soldier, Carol Park	Bucharest		
Russia	Tomb of the Unknown Soldier, Alexander Garden	Moscow		
Serbia	Monument to the Unknown Hero on Mt. Avala	Belgrade		Memorial was built on the place where an unknown Serbian World War I soldier was buried.
Slovenia	Monument to the Unknown French Soldier, French Revolution Square	Ljubljana		
Somalia	Tomb of the Unknown Soldier	Mogadishu		A monument erected in honour of fallen Somali combatants, also known as Daljirka Dahsoon.
Spain	Monumento a los Caídos por España, Plaza de la Lealtad	Madrid		Popularly known as the Obelisco ("Obelisk"), it is built on the same place where General Joachim Murat ordered the execution of numerous Spaniards after the Dos de Mayo Uprising of 1808. Originally inaugurated on 2 May 1840, it was re-inaugurated on 22 November 1985, by King Juan Carlos I of Spain as a remembrance to fallen Spaniards. An eternal flame fuelled by gas has been constantly burning on the front of the monument.
Spain	Memorial de Guerra, Fossar de les Moreres	Barcelona		Situated next to the Santa Maria del Mar church, the memorial stands in the center of a square that was used as a mass grave after the fall of Barcelona in the War of the Spanish Succession in 1714. It has a special significance to catalan nationalism as a symbol of those who fought against the Bourbons to retain Catalonia's laws and freedoms. Today, an eternal flame burns atop a metal structure with inscriptions that remember the unknown soldiers who died defending the city and the country.
Syria	Tomb of the Unknown Soldier	Damascus		The Tomb of the Unknown Soldier (Arabic: ضريح الجندي المجهول) is a war memorial, dedicated to the Syrian soldiers killed during battle. It is visited every year by the President of Syria on Martyrs' Day (May 6). Two Quran verses are engraved into the monument: Think not of those who are slain in God's Way as dead. Nay, they live, finding their sustenance in the Presence of their Lord; They rejoice in the Bounty provided by God: and with regard to those left behind, who have not yet joined them (in their bliss), the (Martyrs) glory in the fact that on them is no fear, nor have they (cause to) grieve.
Ukraine	Tomb of the Unknown Soldier, Park of Eternal Glory	Kyiv		
Ukraine	Monument to the Unknown Sailor, Shevchenko Park	Odesa		
United Kingdom	Tomb of the Unknown Warrior, Westminster Abbey	London		First Tomb of the Unknown Soldier (with Arc de Triomphe in Paris)
United States	Tomb of the Unknown Soldier, Arlington National Cemetery	Arlington, Virginia		
United States	Tomb of the Unknown Revolutionary War Soldier, Washington Square	Philadelphia		
United States	Tomb of the Unknown Soldier of the American Revolution	Alexandria, Virginia		
United States	Civil War Unknowns Monument, Arlington National Cemetery	Arlington County, Virginia		Contains the remains of 2,111 unknown Union and Confederate soldiers from Civil War battlefields.
United States	Tomb of the Unknown Confederate Soldier at Beauvoir	Biloxi, Mississippi		
Uruguay	El Entrevero at Plaza Fabini	Montevideo		Inaugurated in 1967 in honor of the Oriental Revolution its inscription reads in Spanish: "The Fatherland pays tribute to its anonymous heroes, who in the solitude of the fields lost their lives in the sacrifice for their ideals".
Uzbekistan	Tomb of the Unknown Soldier on Mustaqillik Maydoni	Tashkent		Created in 1975, the Tomb of the Unknown Soldier is dedicated to the Uzbek soldiers who served in the Red Army during World War II.
Venezuela	Tomb of the Unknown Soldier on Carabobo Field, Valencia	Carabobo		Contains the remains of a Venezuelan soldier who died in 1824 during the Battle of Ayacucho.
Vietnam	Monument of Heroic Martyrs	Hanoi		Dedicated to fallen soldiers of the Vietnam War.
Zimbabwe	Statue of the Unknown Soldier at the National Heroes' Acre	Harare		

== See also ==
- World War I memorials
- Unidentified decedent
