= Dai Heiwa Kinen Tō =

Cenotaph tower in Osaka, Japan

Coordinates: 34.502147°N 135.586178°E

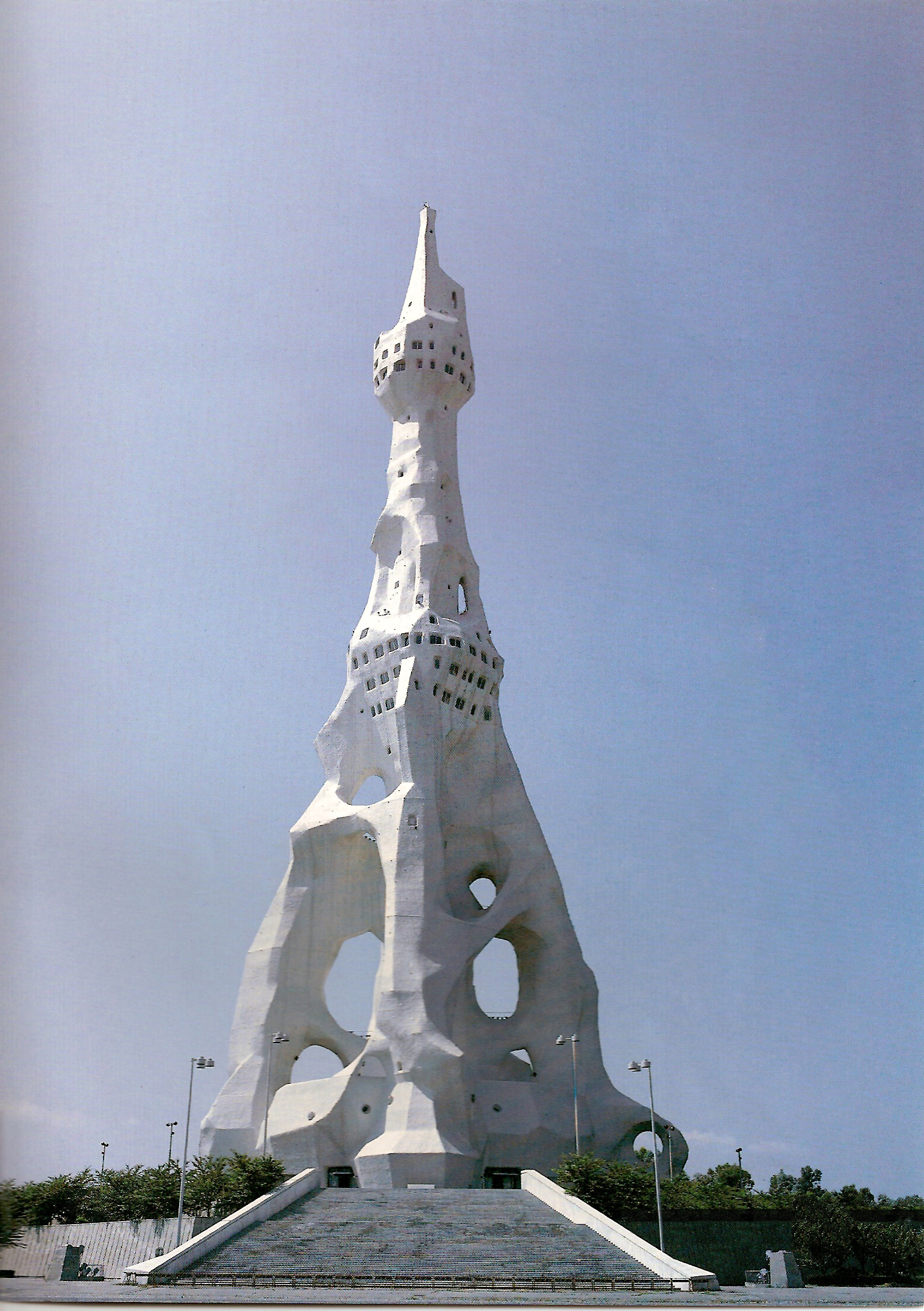
PL Peace Tower

The Great Peace Prayer Tower (Japanese: 大平和祈念塔, Hepburn: Dai Heiwa Kinen Tō) is a cenotaph tower in Tondabayashi, Osaka, Japan.

== General ==
The official name of the cenotaph tower is literally "non-denominational [lit.: above denominations] war victims great cenotaph tower to pray peace" (超宗派万国戦争犠牲者慰霊大平和祈念塔, Chōshūha Bankoku Sensō Giseisha irei dai heiwa kinen tō). The tower is 180 m in height, white in color, and built by the Church of Perfect Liberty in August 1970. The tower was built by Tokyu Construction.

The cenotaph is dedicated to the souls of all war victims in history, regardless of race, ethnic group, sovereign state, border, region, religion, religious denomination and creed. The cenotaph is also used as a tomb for unidentified war victims. A ceremony and memorial service, where participants pray for world peace, is held annually on 1 August.

== See also ==
- Chidorigafuchi National Cemetery
- Ryozen Kannon
- Sekai Mumei Senshi no Haka
- Church of Perfect Liberty
