= 2005 Moscow Victory Day Parade =

Russian military parade

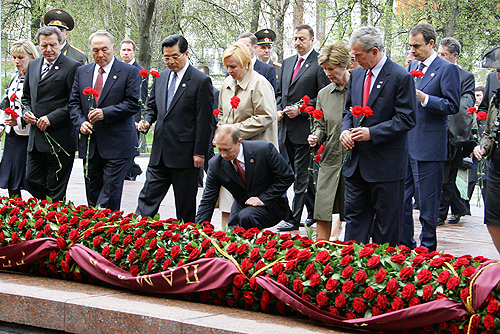
Officials and dignitaries lay flowers at the tomb of the unknown soldier

The 2005 Moscow Victory Day Parade was a military parade which took place in Red Square in Moscow on 9 May 2005 to celebrate the 60th anniversary of the capitulation of Nazi Germany in 1945. The parade was inspected by the Minister of Defence Sergei Ivanov and it was commanded by Moscow Military District Commander General of the Army Ivan Efremov. Music was performed by the Massed Bands of the Moscow Garrison directed by Colonel Valery Khalilov on his 3rd national parade, the first to include 4 international marching bands. After the inspection of the troops, President of the Russian Federation Vladimir Putin gave his 6th-holiday address to the nation. More than 150 foreign dignitaries (included 50 heads of state) were presented. Among them were Secretary General of the United Nations Kofi Annan, European Commission President Jose Manuel Barroso, UNESCO Director General Koichiro Matsuura, President of the United States George W. Bush, President of the People's Republic of China Hu Jintao, Japanese Prime Minister Junichirō Koizumi, French President Jacques Chirac, Chancellor of Germany Gerhard Schroeder, President of Kazakhstan Nursultan Nazarbayev and President of Turkmenistan Saparmurat Niyazov. It was the largest parade in the history of Russia, and one of the largest in the world's history.

== Parade ==
This was the last time veterans took part directly as participants. This time through, reenacting the motorized infantry of the original 1945 parade mobile column, many veterans of the fronts rode in the very trucks which carried infantry to the front lines of the war, arranged accordingly by the fronts they took part at war's end. Veterans from nations such as North Korea and Turkmenistan took part in the parade alongside their Russian counterparts.

=== Troops participating in the parade ===
Following the parade commander's car the parade marched past the saluting grandstand in the following order,

- Corps of Drums of the Moscow Military Music School
- Color Guard of the Victory Banner, the Flag of Russia, and the Armed Forces Colour from the 1st Honor Guard Battalion of the 154th Independent Commandant's Regiment
- Historical Unit
  - Infantry of the Red Army
  - Tank forces
  - Artillery
  - Engineering formations
  - Reconnaissance and commando formations
  - K-9 units of NKVD
  - Soviet Air Force
  - Soviet Navy
  - 1st Cavalry Squadron, Presidential Cavalry Escort Battalion, Kremlin Regiment
- Red Army Veterans in military trucks, arranged in the fronts in order of the 1945 Victory Parade
  - Karelian
  - Leningrad
  - 1st Baltic
  - 3rd Belorussian
  - 2nd Belorussian
  - 1st Belorussian
  - 1st Ukrainian
  - 4th Ukrainian
  - 2nd Ukrainian
  - 3rd Ukrainian
- Combined Arms Academy of the Armed Forces of the Russian Federation
- Peter the Great Military Academy of the Strategic Missile Forces
- Military University of the Ministry of Defense of the Russian Federation
- Military Engineering Academy
- Military University of Radiation, Chemical and Biological Defense named after Marshal Timoshenko
- Gagarin Air Force Academy
- Military Aviation Technical University named after NE Zhukovsky
- Baltic Naval Institute
- Civil Defence Academy of the Ministry of Emergency Situation
- Moscow Military Institute of the Federal Border Service of the Russian Federation
- Ryazan Higher Airborne Command School
- 331st Guards Parachute Regiment, 98th Guards Airborne Division
- Internal Troops of the Ministry of Internal Affairs of Russia
- 336th Guards Naval Infantry Brigade of the Baltic Fleet
- Suvorov Military School
- Nakhimov Naval School
- Moscow Higher Military Command School

=== Music ===
The music and marches were played by the Military Band of the Armed Forces of Russia under the direction of Colonel Valery Khalilov

Inspection and address

- March of the Preobrazhensky Regiment (Марш Преображенского Полка)
- Slow March of the Tankmen (Встречный Марш Танкистов) by Semyon Tchernetsky
- Slow March to Carry the War Flag (Встречный Марш для выноса Боевого Знамени) by Dmitriy Valentinovich Kadeyev
- Slow March of the Guards of the Navy (Гвардейский Встречный Марш Военно-Морского Флота) by Nikolai Pavlocich Ivanov-Radkevich
- Slow March of the Officers Schools (Встречный Марш офицерских училищ) by Semyon Tchernetsky
- Slow March (Встречный Марш) by Dmitry Pertsev
- Slow March of the Red Army (Встречный Марш Красной Армии) by Semyon Tchernetsky
- March of the Preobrazhensky Regiment (Марш Преображенского Полка)
- Glory (Славься) by Mikhail Glinka
- Parade Fanfare All Listen! (Парадная Фанфара «Слушайте все!») by Andrei Golovin
- National Anthem of the Russian Federation (Государственный Гимн Российской Федерации) by Alexander Alexandrov
- Signal Retreat (Сигнал «Отбой»)

Veteran and mobile column

- March General Miloradovich (Марш Генерал Милорадович) by Valery Khalilov
- Farewell of Slavianka (Прощание Славянки) by Vasiliy Agapkin
- Defenders of Moscow (Защитников Москвы) by Boris Alexandrovich Mokroysov
- Artillery March (Марш Артиллеристов) by Tikhon Khrennikov
- Katyusha (Катюша) by Matvey Blanter
- Ballad of a Soldier (Баллада о Солдате) by Vasily Pavlovich Solovyov-Sedoy
- Sacred War (Священная Война) by Alexandr Alexandrov
- March The track to the frontline/The Song of the frontline driver (Марш «Дорожка фронтовая»/Песенка фронтового шофёра) by Boris Andreyevich Mokrousov
- March Victory (Марш Победа) by Albert Mikhailovich Arutyunov
- Lefort's March (Лефортовский Марш) by Valery Khalilov
- On Guard for the Peace (На страже Мира) by Boris Alexandrovich Diev
- Combat March (Строевой Марш) by Dmitry Illarionovich Pertsev
- Air March (Авиамарш) by Yuliy Abramovich Khait
- March of the Cosmonauts/Friends, I believe (Марш Космонавтов /Я верю, друзья) by Oskar Borisovich Feltsman
- March Farewell, rocky mountains (Марш/Песня «Прощайте, скалистые горы») by Evgeny Emmanuilovich Zharkovsky
- Crew is One Family (Экипаж - одна семья) by Viktor Vasilyevich Pleshak
- We are the Army of the People (Мы Армия Народа) by Georgy Viktorovich Mavsesya
- We Need One Victory (Нам Нужна Одна Победа) by Bulat Shalvovich Okudzhava
- Glory to the Heroes (Слава героям) by Dmitry Illarionovich Pertsev
- On the Road (В Путь) by Vasily Pavlovich Solovyov-Sedoy
- In Defense of the Homeland (В защиту Родины) by Viktor Sergeyevich Runov

Conclusion

- Victory Day (День Победы) by David Fyodorovich Tukhmanov
- Song of the Russian Army (Песня о Российской Армии) by Alexandr Alexandrov

== Dignitaries in attendance ==
The Victory Day parade drew many international statesman to the Russian capital in the days leading up to 9 May. According to the Russian government, top leaders from 56 countries were invited to join Putin in the 2005 parade. In total, about 150 countries were represented at the parade. It was the largest gathering of world leaders in Russian history. The parade was the first one to be attended by world leaders since the 1995 parade (which attracts 57 countries).

List of international leaders and dignitaries at the 2005 parade
- President of Russia - Vladimir Putin and his wife Lyudmila
- Secretary-General of the United Nations - Kofi Annan
- (European Union) President of the European Commission - José Manuel Barroso
- President of China and CCP General Secretary - Hu Jintao
- President of the United States - George W. Bush and his wife Laura
- President of Croatia - Stjepan Mesić
- President of the Czech Republic - Václav Klaus
- Deputy Prime Minister of the United Kingdom - John Prescott
- President of Mongolia - Natsagiin Bagabandi
- Prime Minister of Denmark - Anders Fogh Rasmussen
- Prime Minister of India - Manmohan Singh
- President of Poland - Aleksander Kwaśniewski
- Prime Minister of Spain - José Luis Rodríguez Zapatero
- Prime Minister of Luxembourg - Jean-Claude Juncker
- Prime Minister of Italy - Silvio Berlusconi
- (Republic of Ireland) Prime Minister of Ireland - Bertie Ahern
- President of Israel - Moshe Katsav and his wife Gila Katsav
- Governor General of Canada - Adrienne Clarkson and her husband John Ralston Saul
- President of Armenia - Robert Kocharyan and his wife Bella
- President of Hungary - Ferenc Mádl
- President of South Korea - Roh Moo-hyun
- Prime Minister of Japan - Junichiro Koizumi
- Prime Minister of the Netherlands - Jan Peter Balkenende
- President of Cyprus - Tassos Papadopoulos
- President of Moldova - Vladimir Voronin
- President of Romania - Traian Băsescu
- Chancellor of Germany - Gerhard Schroeder
- President of Albania - Alfred Moisiu
- President of Austria - Heinz Fischer
- President of Ukraine - Viktor Yushchenko
- Prime Minister of Turkey - Recep Tayyip Erdogan
- President of Greece - Karolos Papoulias
- President of France - Jacques Chirac
- President of Finland - Tarja Halonen
- President of Kyrgyzstan - Kurmanbek Bakiyev and his wife Tatyana Bakiyeva
- President of Azerbaijan - Ilham Aliyev and his wife Mehriban Aliyeva
- President of Serbia and Montenegro - Svetozar Marović
- President of Slovakia - Ivan Gašparovič
- President of Slovenia - Janez Drnovšek
- President of Turkmenistan - Saparmurat Niyazov
- President of Tajikistan - Emomali Rahmon
- President of Kazakhstan - Nursultan Nazarbayev
- President of Latvia - Vaira Vīķe-Freiberga
- President of Uzbekistan - Islam Karimov
- President of Bulgaria - Georgi Parvanov
- President of Bosnia and Herzegovina - Borislav Paravac
- Former President of Russia - Boris Yeltsin
- Former President of Poland - Wojciech Jaruzelski
- Former King of Romania - Michael I
- Former leader of the Soviet Union - Mikhail Gorbachev
- Former President of Cyprus - Glafcos Klerides

Chancellor Gerhard Schroeder brought with him a group of Wehrmacht veterans, whom Vladimir Putin personally approached after a military parade on Red Square. Prime Minister Silvio Berlusconi also arrived with Italian veterans.

=== Cancelled attendees ===
President of Georgia Mikheil Saakashvili, as well as two Presidents of Baltic nations, did not attend despite being invited. Saakashvili justified his refusal to attend by saying that "there was nothing much to celebrate in Moscow", instead hosting a ceremony at the Tomb of the Unknown Soldier in Tbilisi, and hosting President Bush in the Georgian capital the following day. Lithuanian President Valdas Adamkus and Estonian President Arnold Rüütel jointly announced their non-participation in the parade on 7 March. They were all represented by lower-level politicians. In addition to that, a number of ambassadors and war veterans were presented as private attendees. British Prime Minister Tony Blair was unable to attend due to an emergency engagement followed the 2005 United Kingdom general election. Belarusian President Alexander Lukashenko was also invited, however instead chose to preside over the Victory Day Parade on Minsk's Victors Avenue.

== Gallery ==
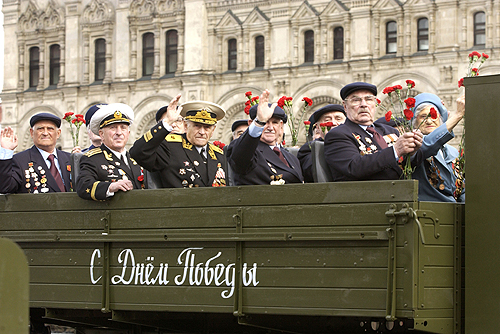
WW2 Veterans of the Soviet Union on Parade

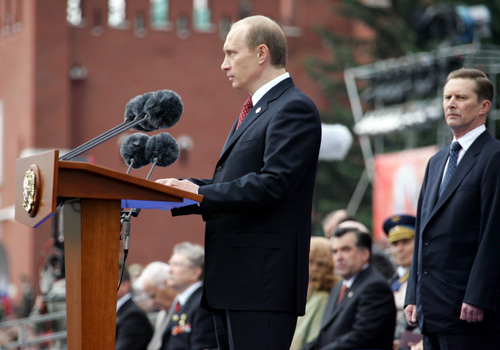
President of the Russian Federation Vladimir Putin's Victory Day Parade speech

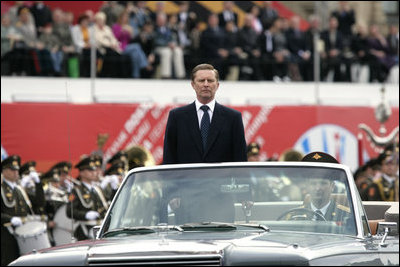
Minister of Defense Sergei Ivanov

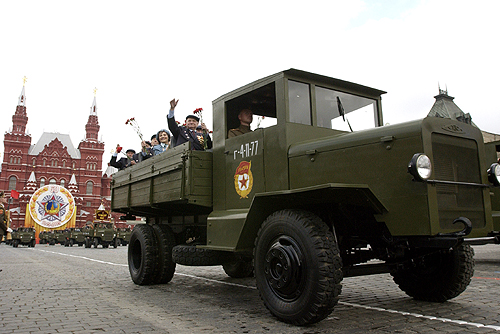
Veterans of the War.

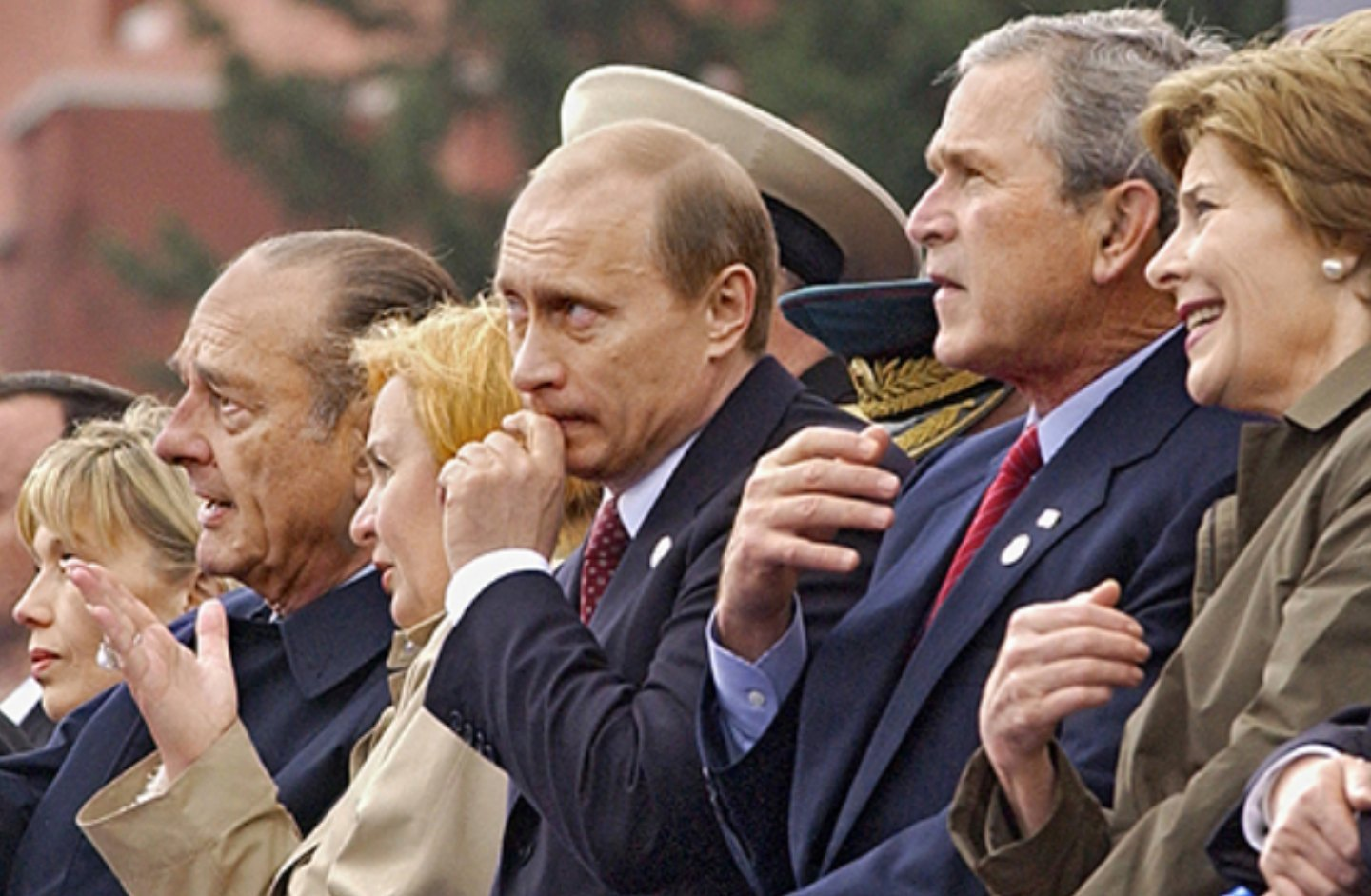
Heads of state (from left to right) : Jacques Chirac, Vladimir Putin and George W. Bush.

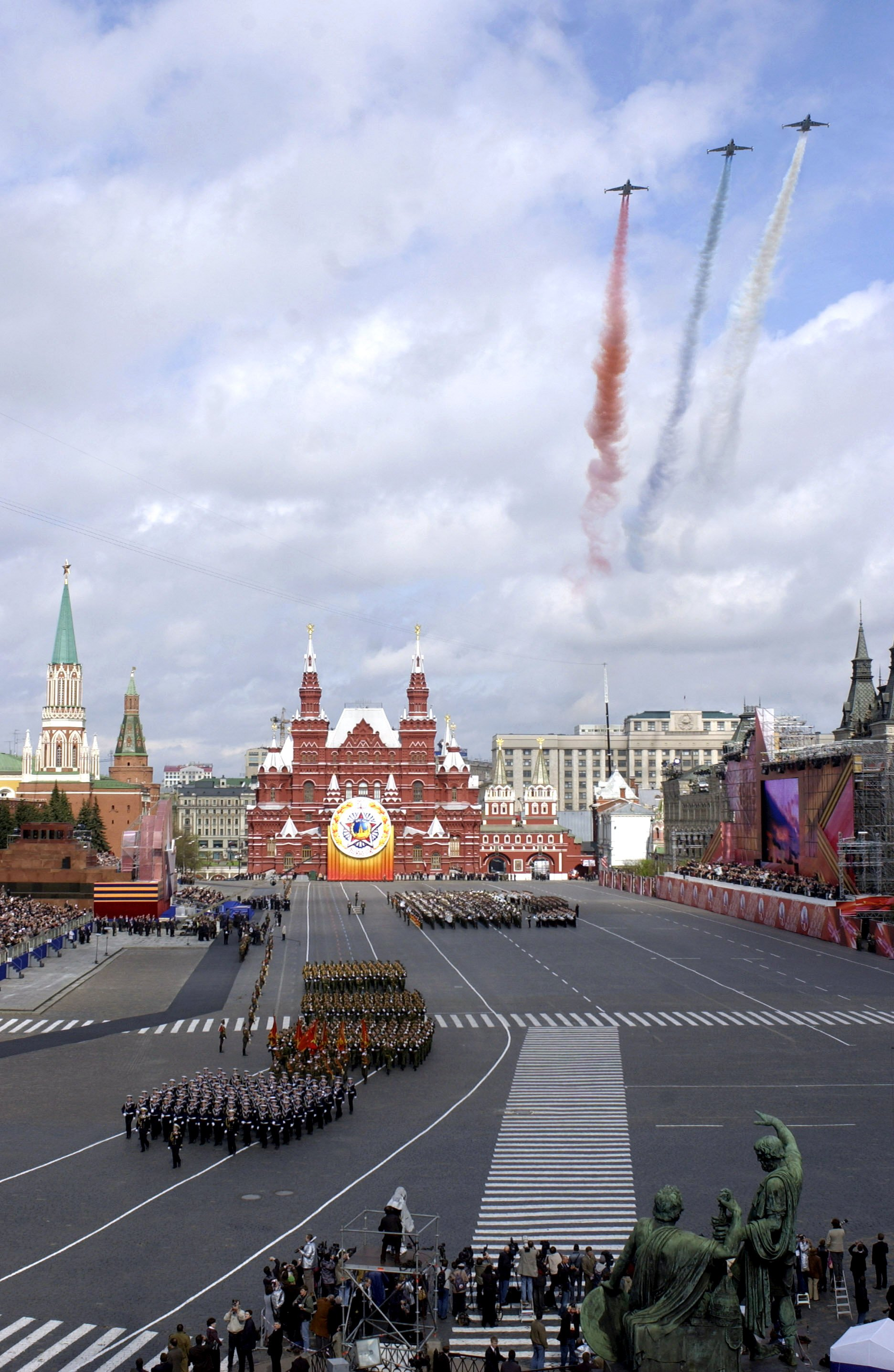

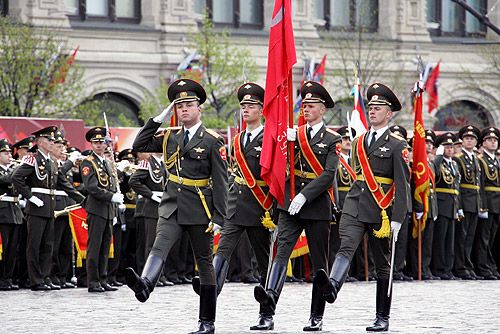

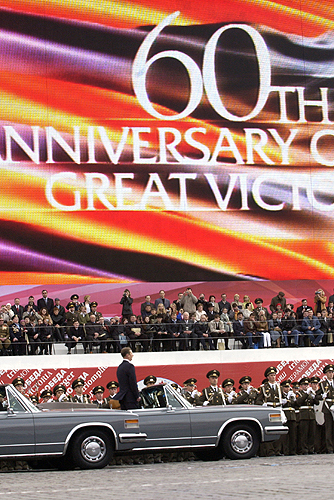

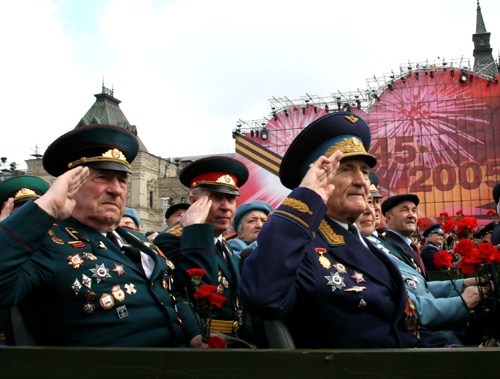

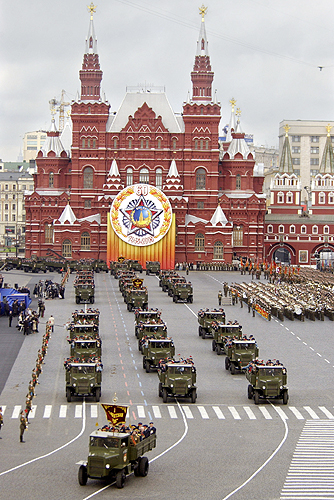

== See also ==
- Moscow Victory Parade of 1945
- Victory Day (9 May)
- Victory in Europe Day
- Victory Day Parades
