= Sekai Mumei Senshi no Haka =

Cenotaph in Saitama Prefecture, Japan

Coordinates: 35°57′51″N 139°17′22″E

Sekai Mumei Senshi no Haka (世界無名戦士之墓), lit. Tomb of the Unknown Soldier of the World, is a cenotaph in Ogose, Saitama Japan.

== General ==
The plan for a cenotaph was promoted with Hidekuni Hasebe (長谷部秀邦) vice-speaker of Saitama prefectural assembly (埼玉県議会, Saitama-ken gikai) and built in 1953. The cenotaph houses 264 remains and commemorated the souls of Japanese and the 2.51 million souls of dead soldiers from more than 60 countries during World War II. A memorial service, Shichi-Go-San parade, garden plant market and fireworks are held on the second Saturday or Sunday of May annually.

== See also ==
- Chidorigafuchi National Cemetery
- Ryozen Kannon
