= Monument to the Unknown Sailor =

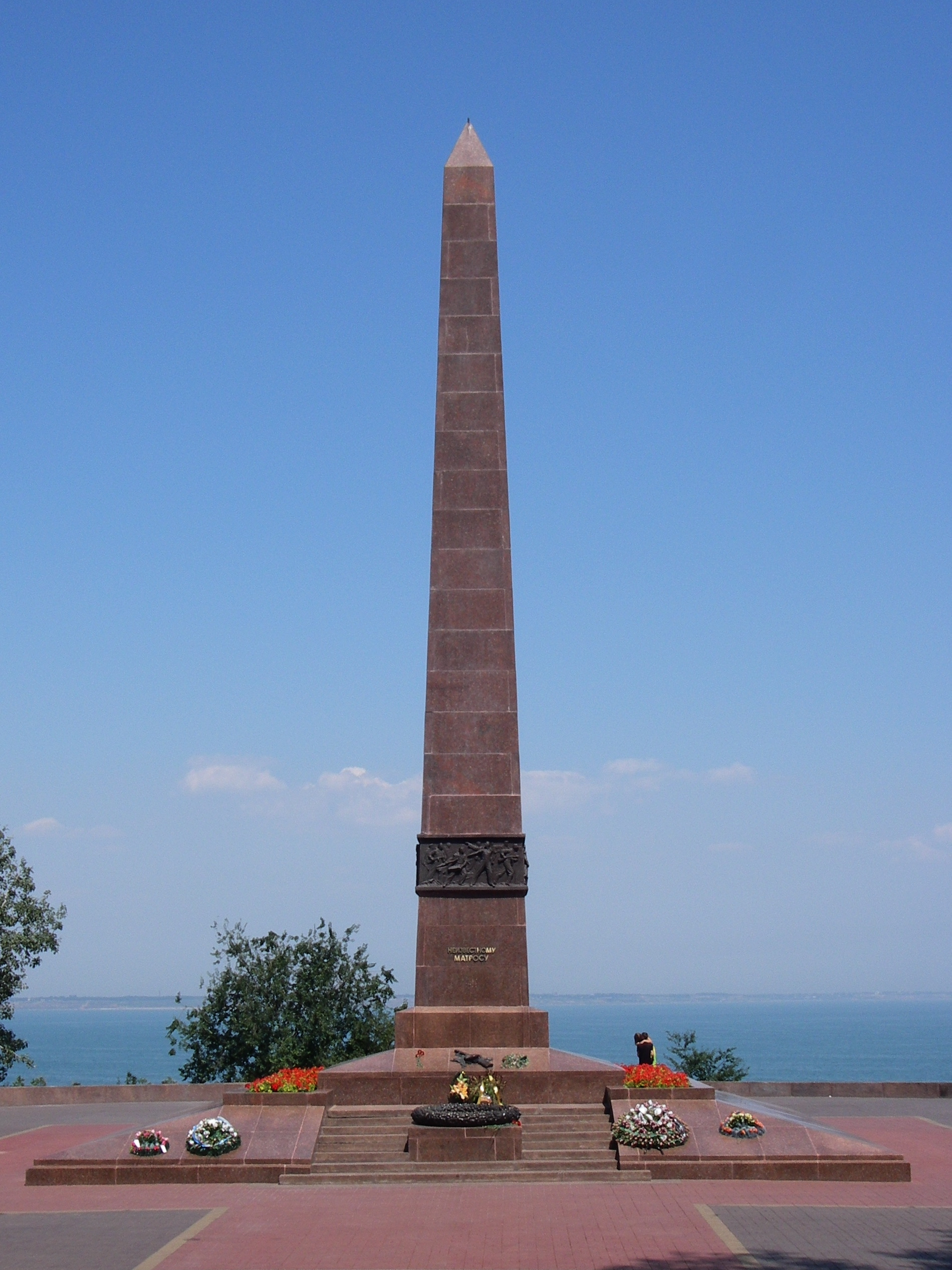
- Interactive map of Monument to the Unknown Sailor
- Type: War Memorial
- Location: Odesa, Ukraine
- Coordinates: 46°28′45″N 30°45′41″E
- Created: 1960
- Status: All year

The Monument to the Unknown Sailor (Ukrainian: Пам'ятник невідомому матросу) is a city memorial located at Shevchenko Park in the Southern Ukrainian city of Odesa. It is part of the park's Alley of Glory, with the graves of fallen sailors on each side. An eternal flame is burning at foot of the monument.

== History ==
Construction of the monument began in the monument in 1957. The monument was erected on 9 May 1960 in honour of all Soviet sailors who died during the defence of the city in the Odesa Operation of the 1944 Dnieper–Carpathian Offensive. The memorial consists of a 21-meter high obelisk of red granite. At the foot of the obelisk burns an eternal flame, immortalizing the memory of sailors of the Soviet Navy. In the alley are the graves of Heroes of the Soviet Union Mikhail Astashkin and Vitaliy Topolsky.

Presidents of Ukraine such as Petro Poroshenko have visited the memorial to honour the Liberation of Odesa. Navy delegations from countries like Italy and Russia have also visited the memorial as well. An honour guard composed of local cadets stands guard at the memorial mainly on public holidays and on ceremonial occasions. It has been in recent years been the focal point for nationalist and pro-Russian tensions, with a nationalist burning a Ribbon of Saint George at the monument in 2018 and in April 2019, a boy being found guilty of damaging the monument by breaking off a part of the bronze soldier.

== Gallery ==
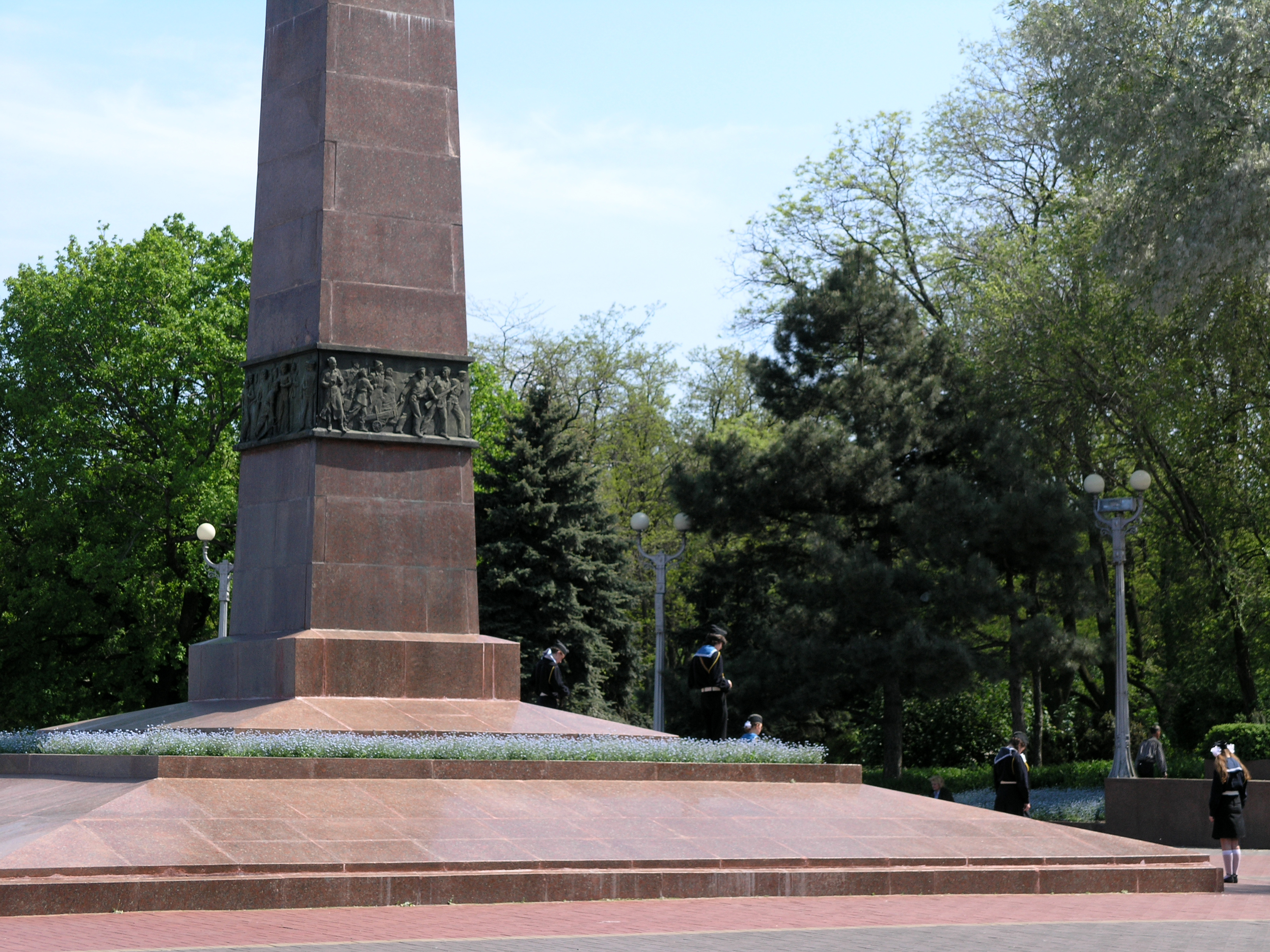
The memorial in May 2006

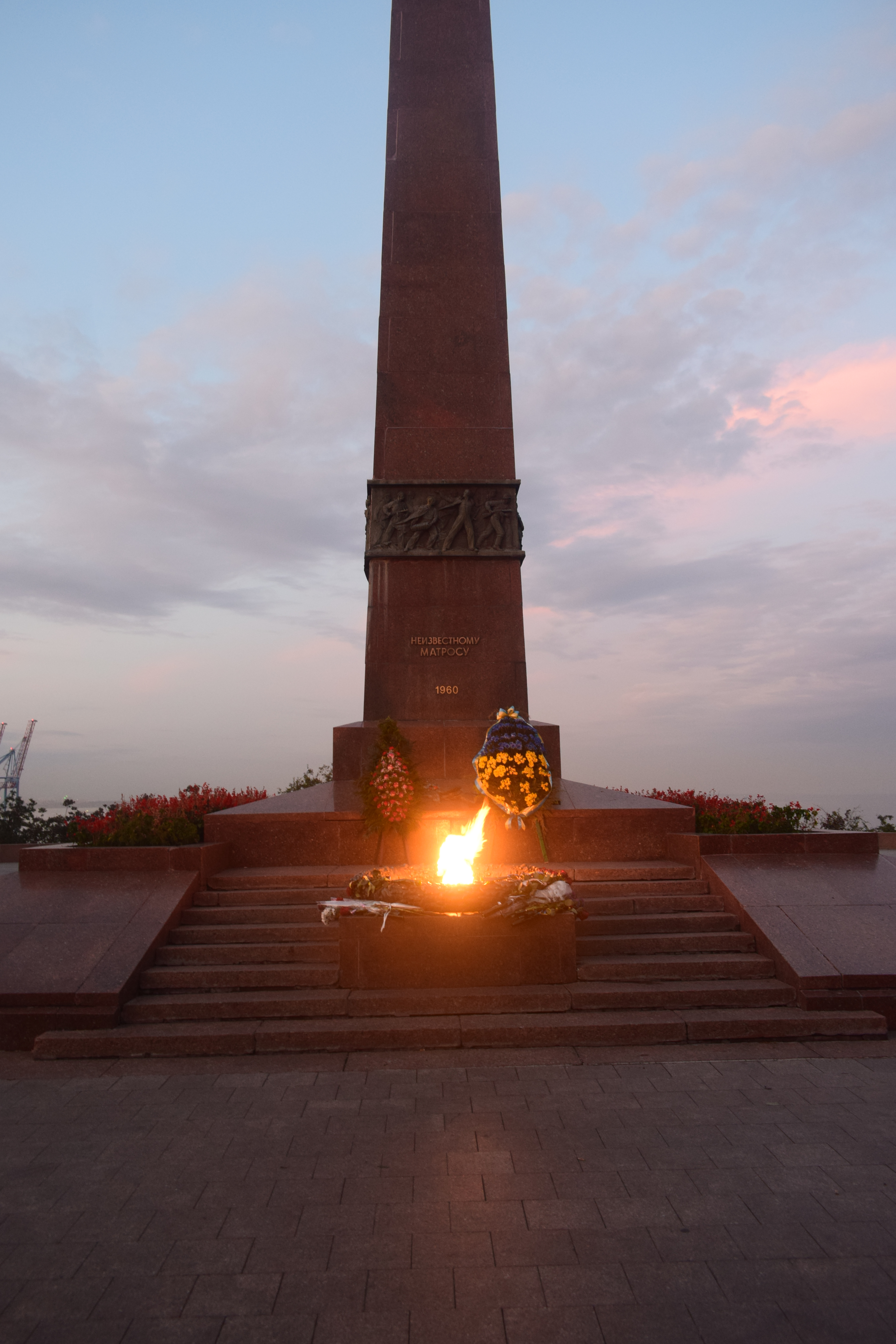
The eternal flame at the memorial in the night time

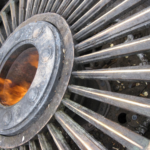
A closeup of the eternal flame

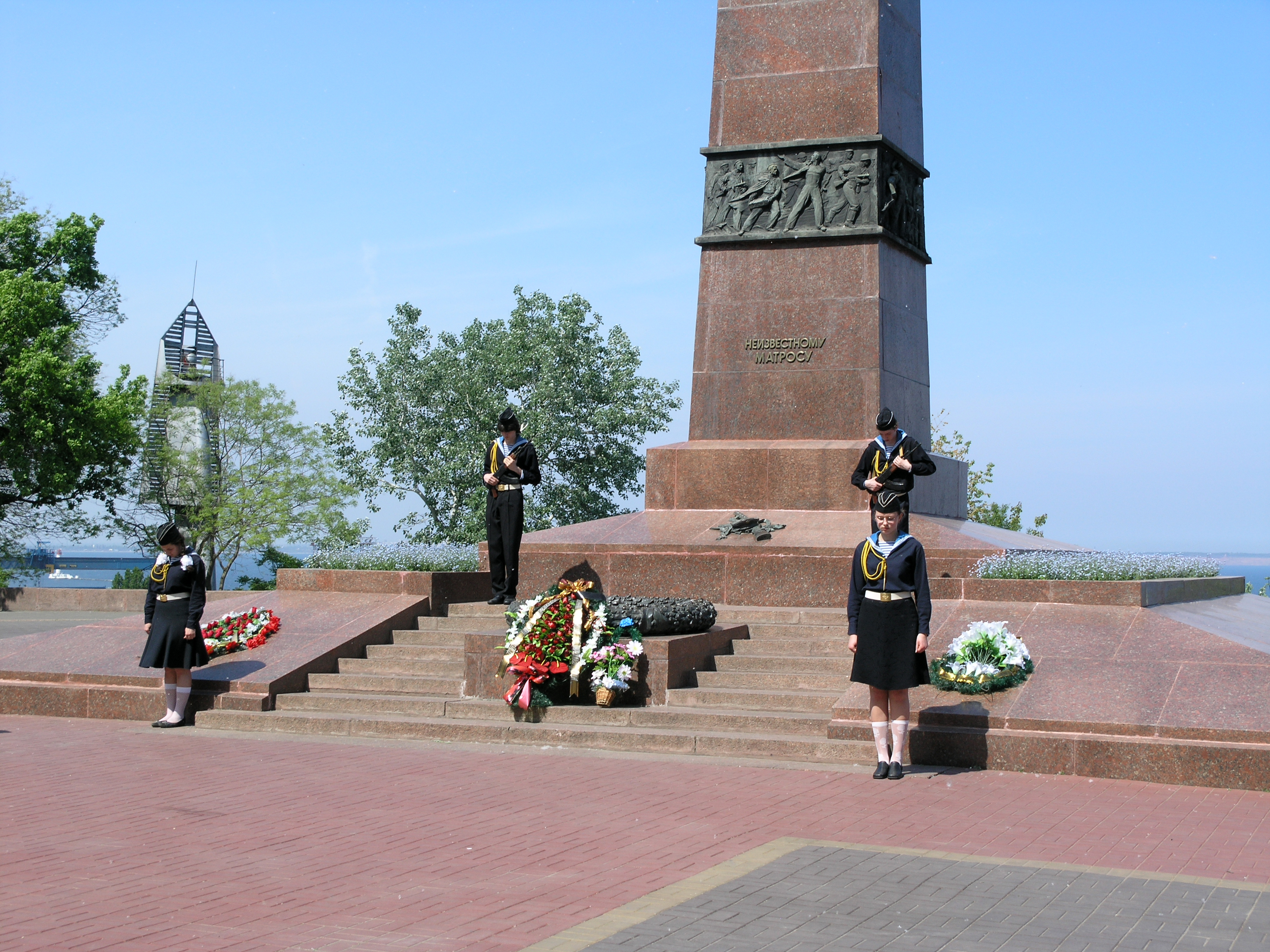
Male and female cadets bowing their heads in respect while guarding the monument

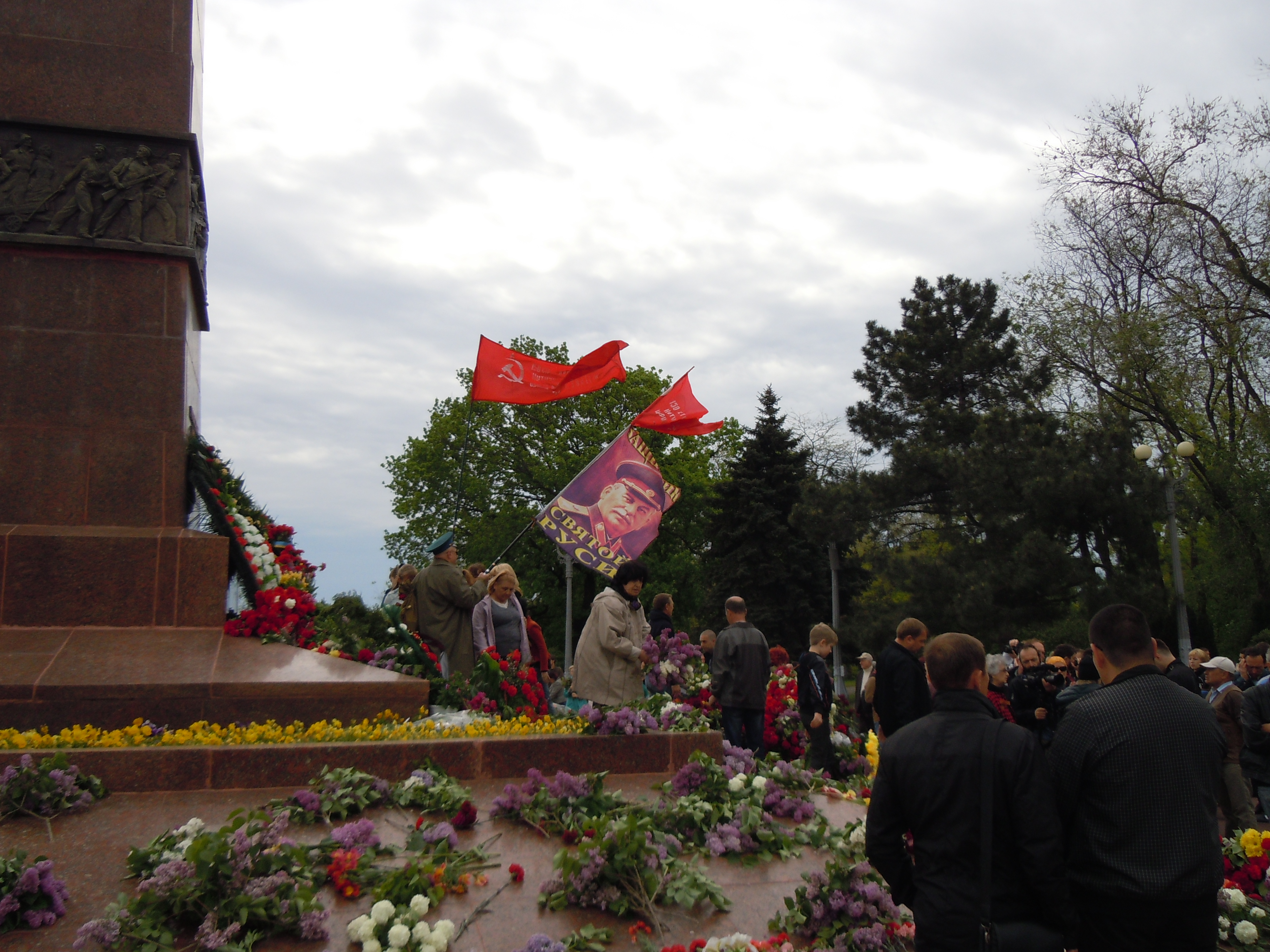
Victory Day celebrations at the monument in 2014

== See also ==
- Tomb of the Unknown Soldier (Kyiv)
- Tomb of the Unknown Soldier (Moscow)
- Memorial of Glory (Tiraspol)
- Bronze Soldier of Tallinn
- Unknown Sailor Monument
