= Alexandria Naval Unknown Soldier Memorial =

Coordinates: 31°11′59″N 29°53′37″E

Memorial
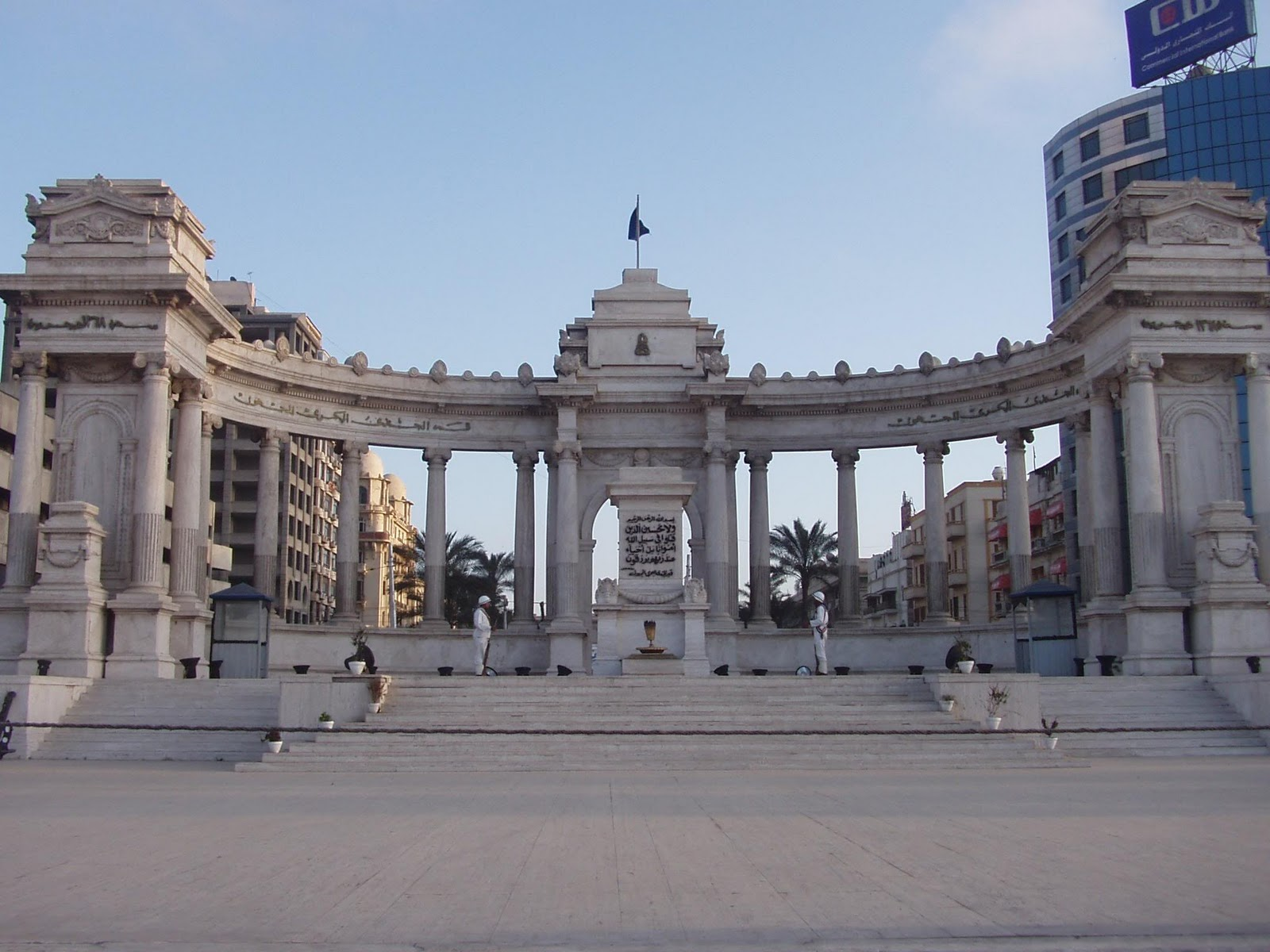
- Naval Unknown Soldier Memorial as seen from the shore of Alexandria
- Location: Alexandria

Alexandria Naval Unknown Soldier Memorial at the Manshaya district is dedicated to the unknown soldiers who lost their lives in the sea battles, it is present on the Corniche of Alexandria. It was built under the rule of Muhammed Ali of Egypt as Alexandria was the main naval base for his son Ibrahim Pasha's expedition to Greece during the Greek War of Independence, that culminated in the Battle of Navarino.

Originally a memorial to Khedive Ismail built by Italian residents of Alexandria, its status was changed following the Egyptian Revolution of 1952 to commemorate fallen naval personnel.

== See also ==
- Unknown Soldier Memorial (Egypt)
