= Tomb of the Unknown Soldier, Tbilisi =

Monument and memorial in Vake Park, Tbilisi, Georgia

Tomb of the Unknown Soldier
- უცნობი ჯარისკაცის საფლავი
- Georgia
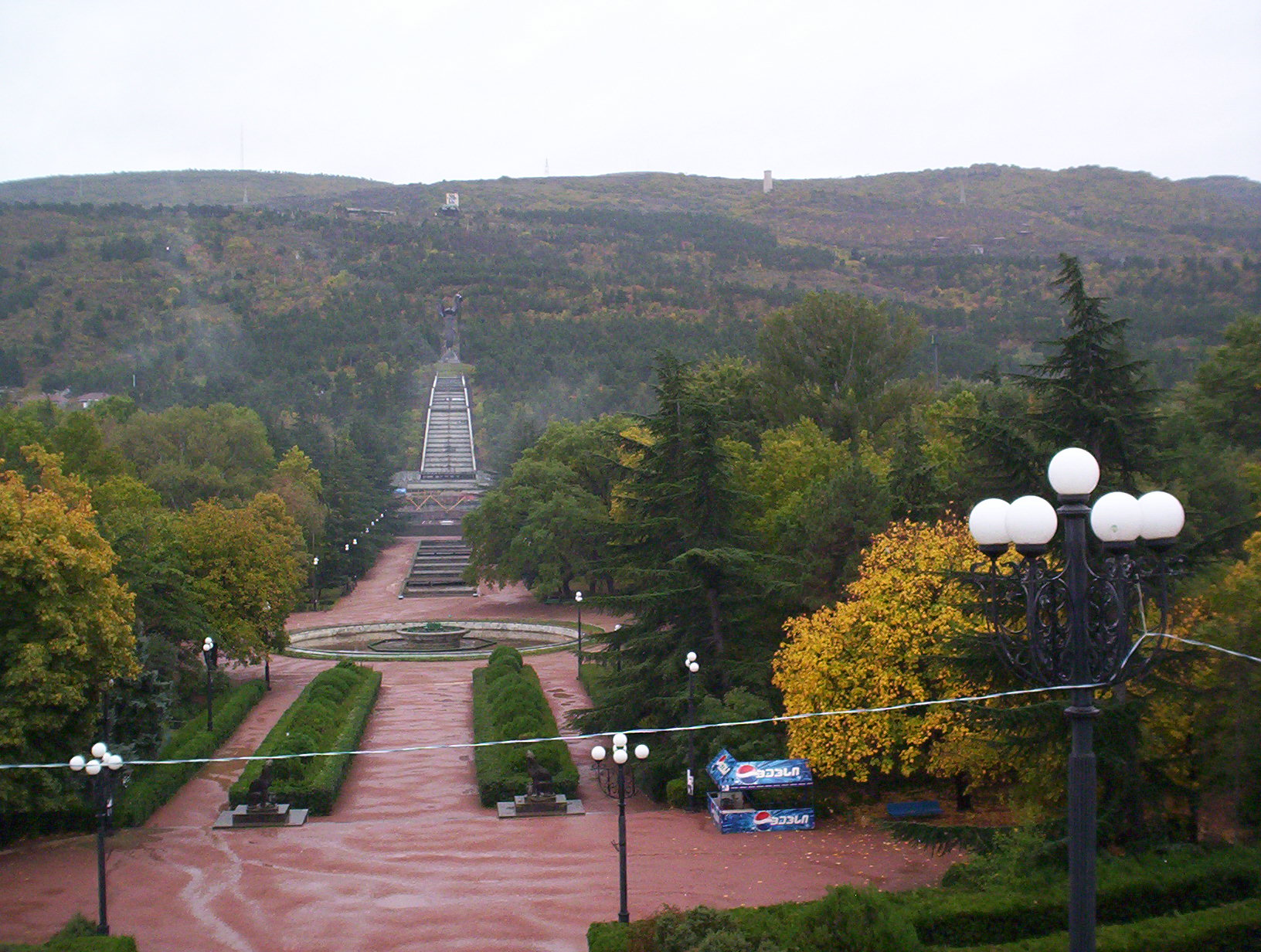
- Vake Park, the area that houses the Tomb to the Unknown Soldier
- For Georgian veterans of Second World War
- Unveiled: 1981
- Location: 41°42′30″N 44°45′5″E near Tbilisi
- Designed by: Nikola Nikolov

The Tomb of the Unknown Soldier (Georgian: უცნობი ჯარისკაცის საფლავი, romanized: utsnobi jarisk'atsis saplavi) is a monument and memorial in Vake Park in central Tbilisi, the capital of Georgia. It commemorates the hundreds of thousands of Georgian soldiers who served and died in the Red Army during the Second World War. The monument was opened officially by Soviet General Secretary Leonid Brezhnev and First Secretary of the Communist Party of the Georgian SSR Eduard Shevardnadze, as part of the diamond jubilee of the republic.

Between 1981 and 1985, Georgian sculptor Giorgi Ochiauri created sculptures that were placed around the tomb, which would later be moved in 2009 to Gori Fortress. The tomb features an eternal flame, as well as sculptures to fallen soldiers and the rising figure of a woman holding a banner and a branch. Georgian veterans of war and residents of the capital gather at the tomb to commemorate holidays such as Victory Day (9 May). Foreign leaders also lay wreaths at the tomb during their state visits to the capital. Dignitaries such as Leonid Brezhnev, British Prime Minister Margaret Thatcher and Belarusian President Alexander Lukashenko have visited the tomb.

== Gallery ==
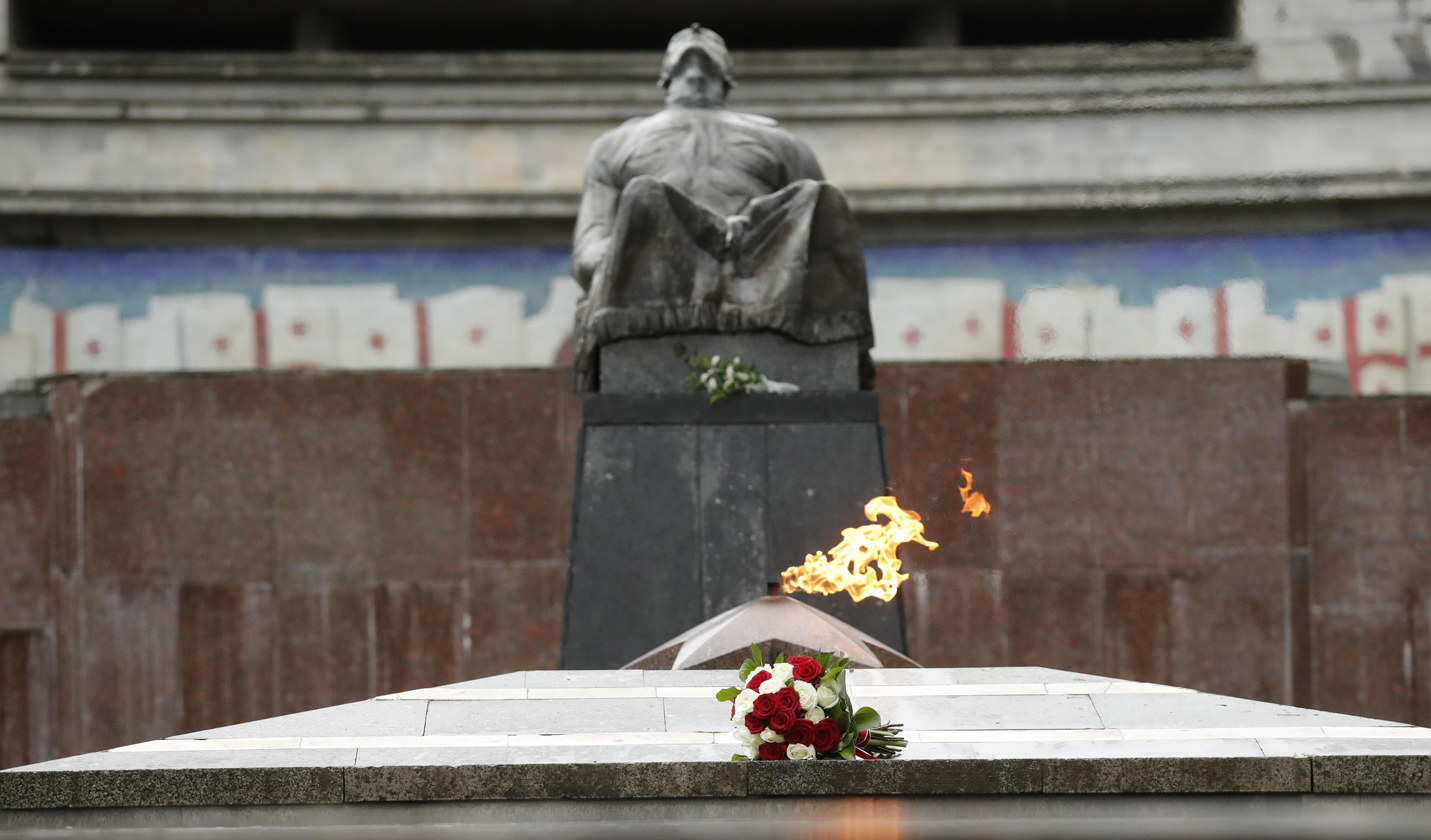
The eternal flame.

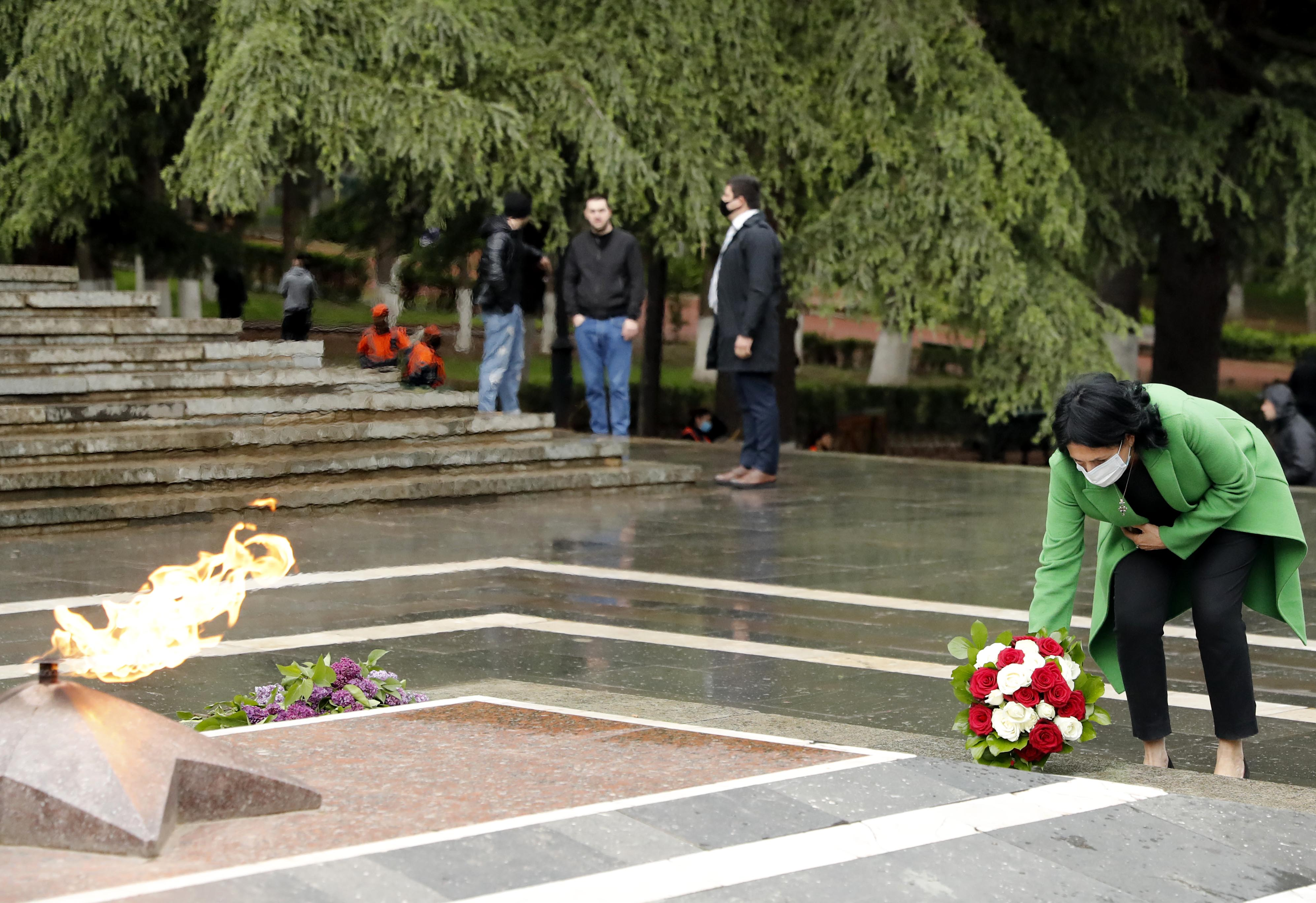
President Salome Zourabichvili laying flowers at the memorial.

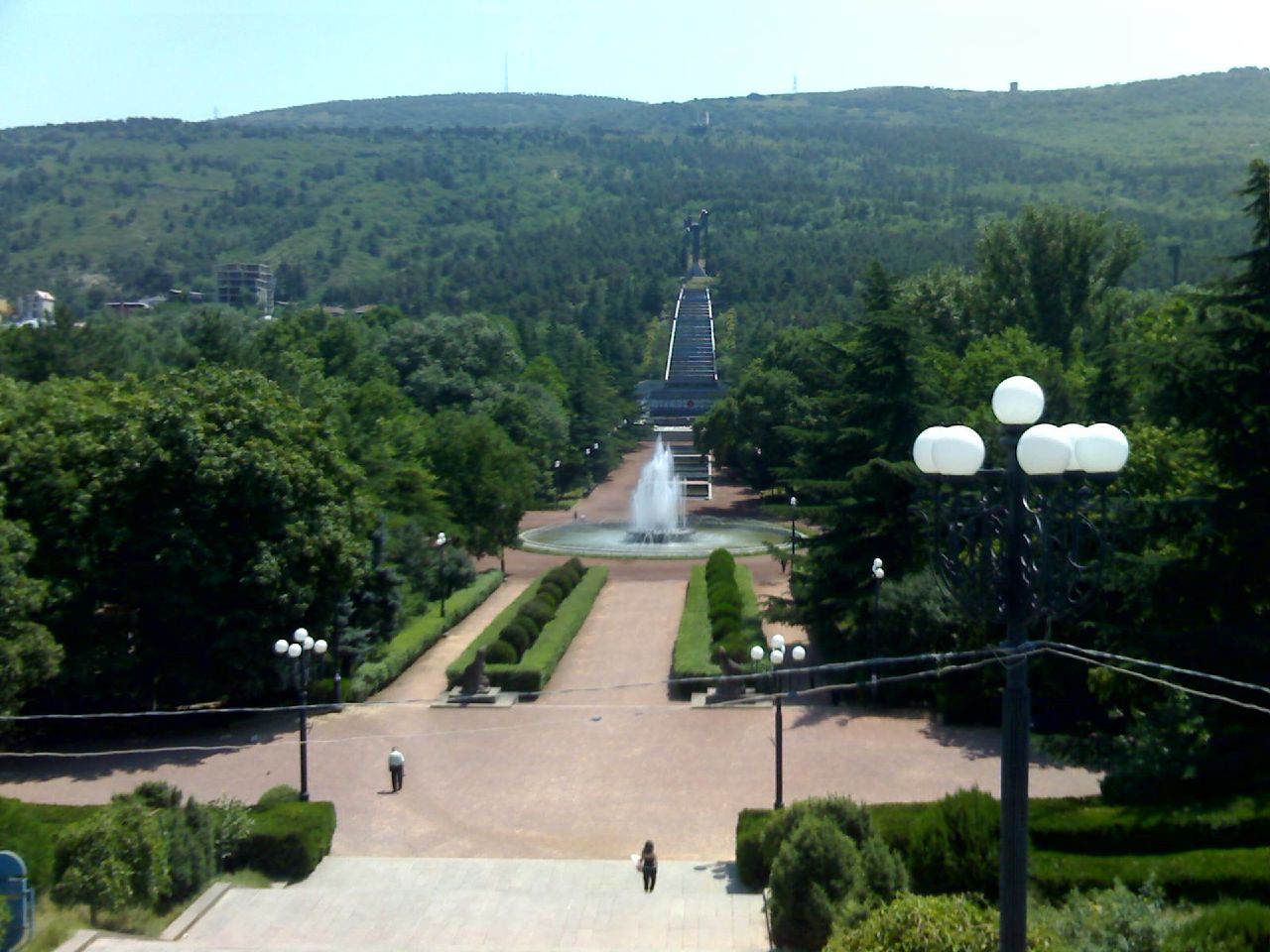
Vake Park
