= Unknown Sailor Monument =

War memorial near Iquique, Chile

The Unknown Sailor Monument is a monument built in honor to the sailors who fought and died in the Battle of Iquique, a naval battle off the coast of Chile.

This monument was given by the Chilean Navy to the city of Iquique in tribute to the seamen.

It was opened by the Commander in Chief of the Navy and member of the Pinochet-led Military Junta, Admiral José Toribio Merino, on August 20, 1977, when Commander Eduardo Angulo Budge was in charge of the Naval District North.

== Description ==
The monument is located in the extreme north of the city Iquique, and it is an imposing statue made of bronze wielding the Chilean flag.

The monument is a figure of an unknown sailor, in whose hands rests an axe as a sign of boarding. It is looking at the sea and behind it there are sandy hills. His figure represents sailors without identity, who lost their lives at sea. We can also see at the entrance an explanatory sign showing the movements of the ships during the Naval Battle. This statue stands atop a small rocky summit, from where tourists are able to gaze the entire coast of Iquique, including the Buoy “Esmeralda”. It is located opposite the buoy that indicates where the sunken remains of Corvette Esmeralda are located, which was defeated during the Naval Battle of Iquique in 1879.
