= Ryōzen Kannon =

Shrine Kyōto-shi, Kyoto, Japan

Coordinates: 35°00′00″N 135°46′55″E

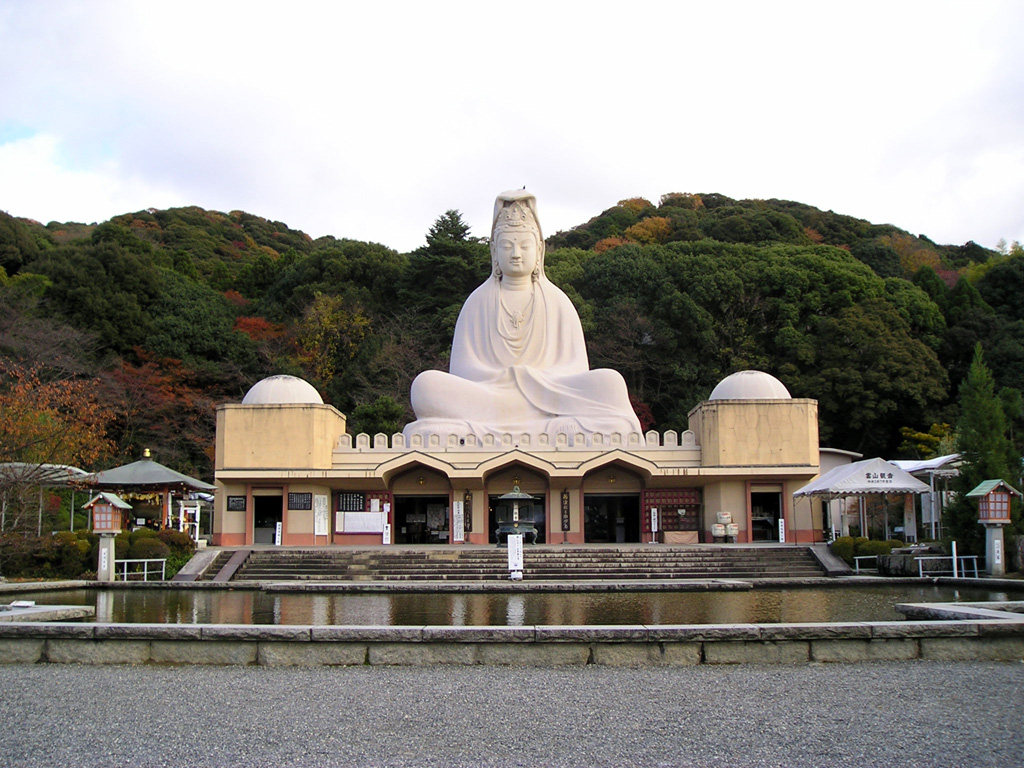
Concrete statue of the Bodhisattva Avalokiteśvara.

The Ryōzen Kannon (霊山観音) is a war memorial commemorating the dead of the Pacific War located in Eastern Kyoto. The concrete and steel statue of the Bodhisattva Avalokiteśvara (Kannon) was built by Hirosuke Ishikawa (founder of Teisan Kanko Bus Co., Ltd.) and unveiled on 8 June 1955. The statue is 24 m (80 ft) high and weighs approximately 500 tons.

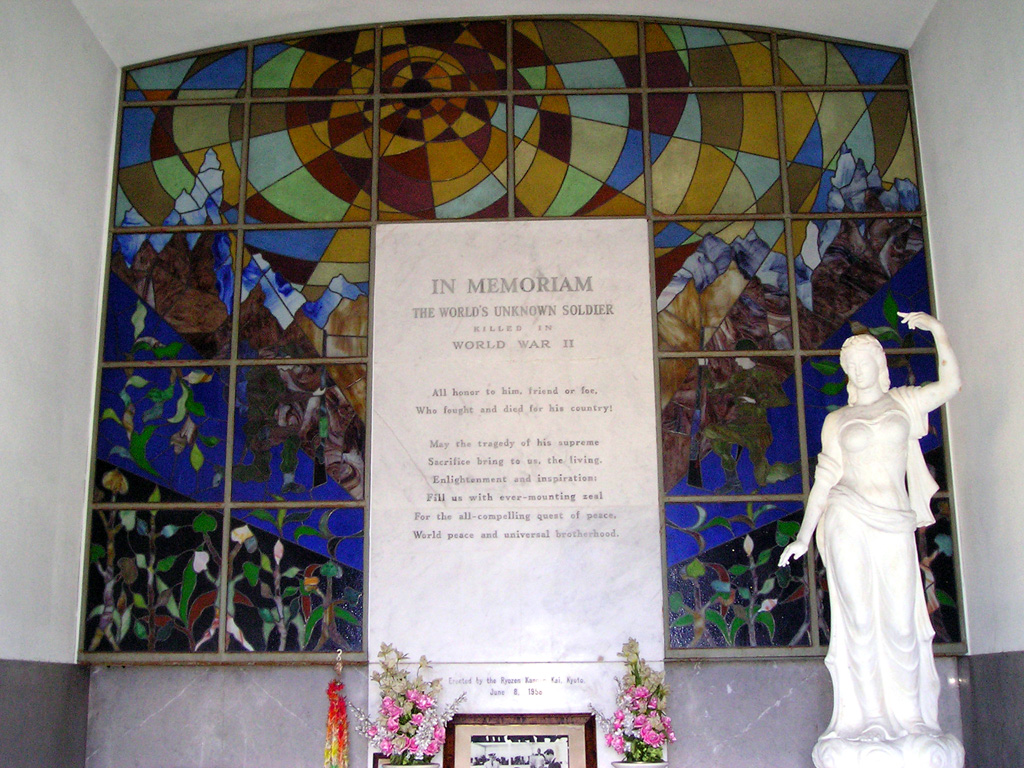
Memorial to the Unknown Soldier of World War II.

The shrine beneath the statue contains an image of Bodhisattva Ekādaśamukha and images of the god of wind and god of thunder. Memorial tablets of 2 million Japanese who died in World War II are also stored here. Four times a day services are conducted in their memory. Also on the site is a memorial hall in honour of the unknown soldier killed in World War II.

== Gallery ==
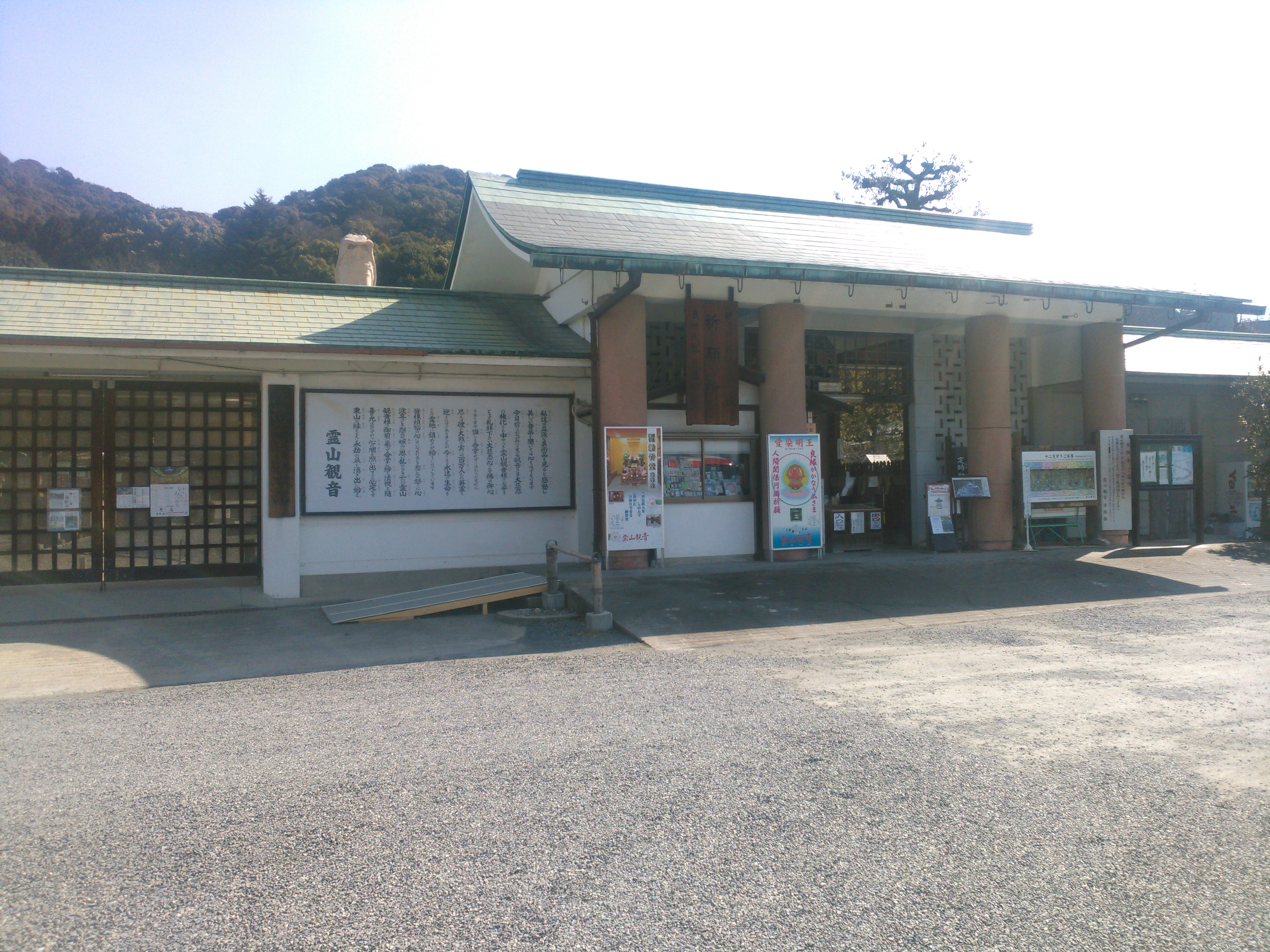
Front gate

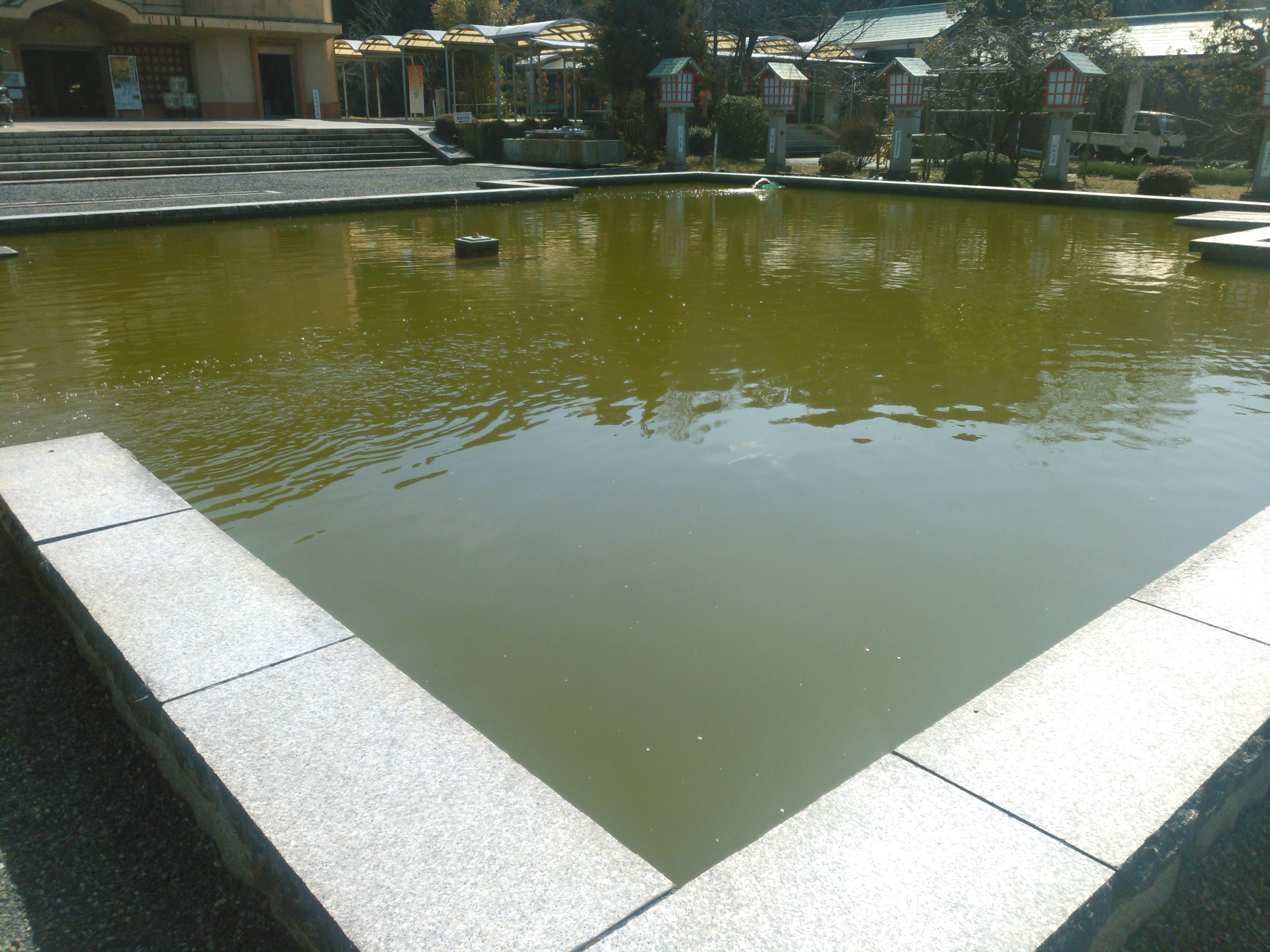
Kagami Ike (Mirror Pool)

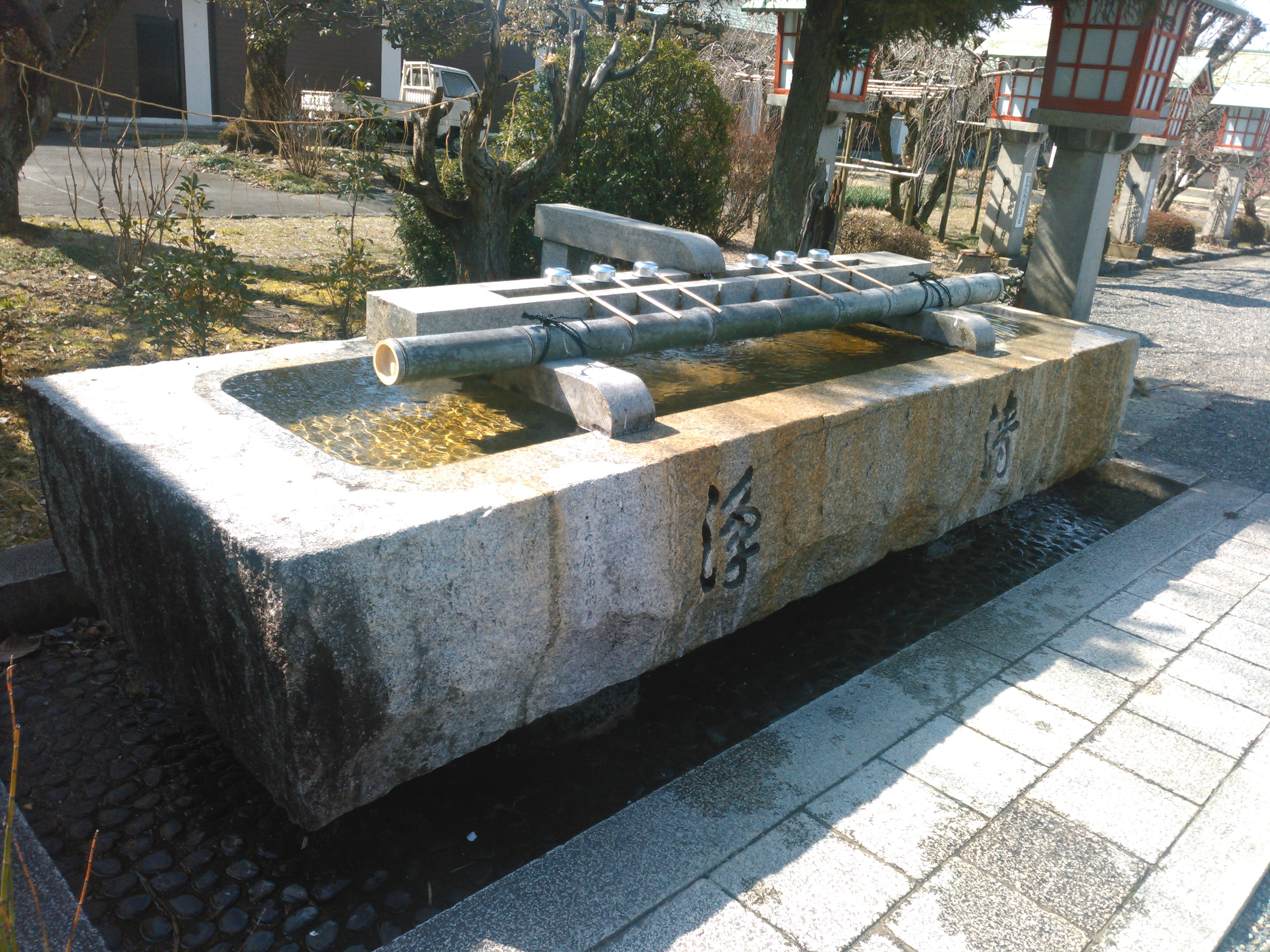
Hand rinsing basin

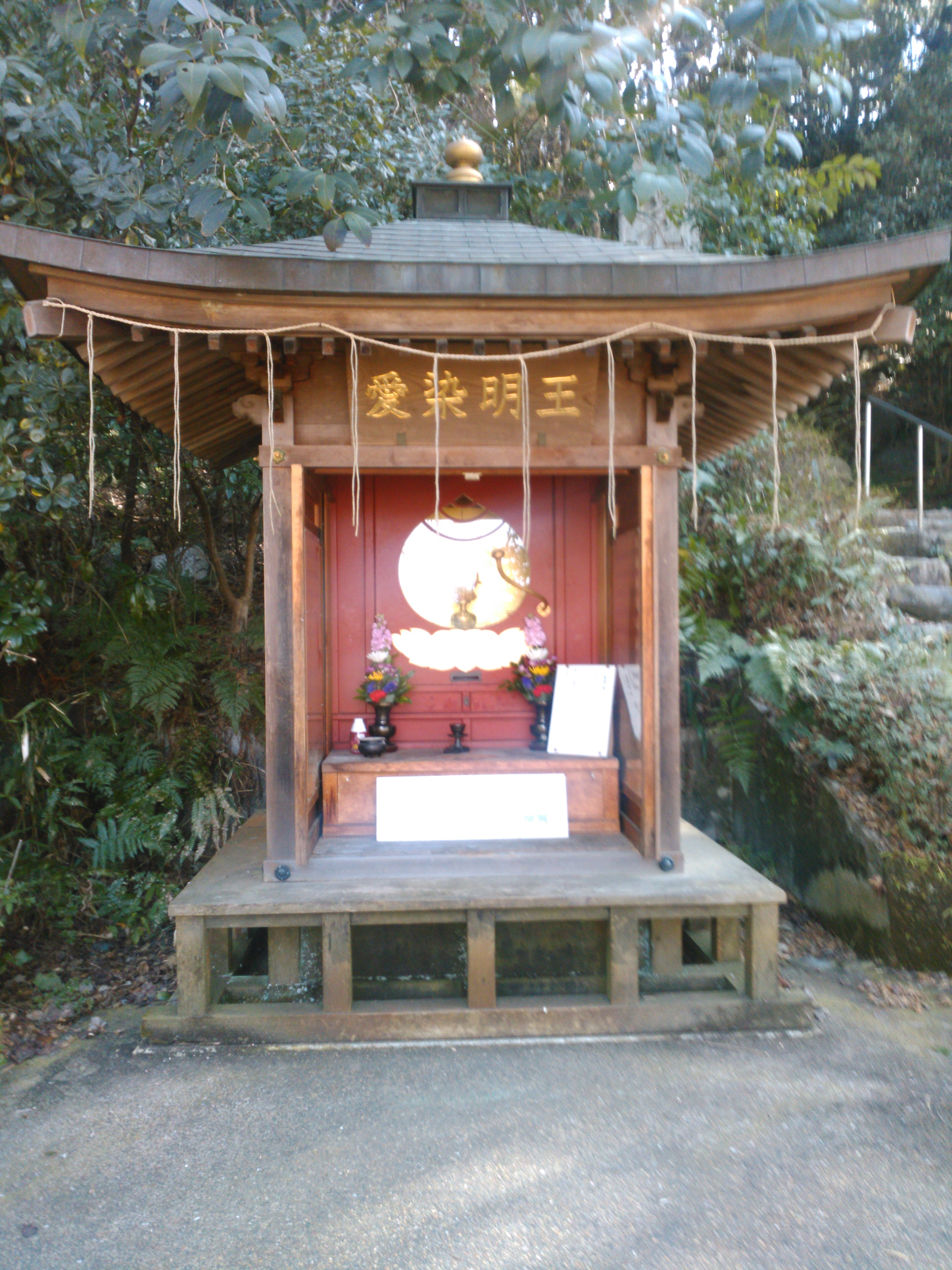
Shrine to Rāgarāja

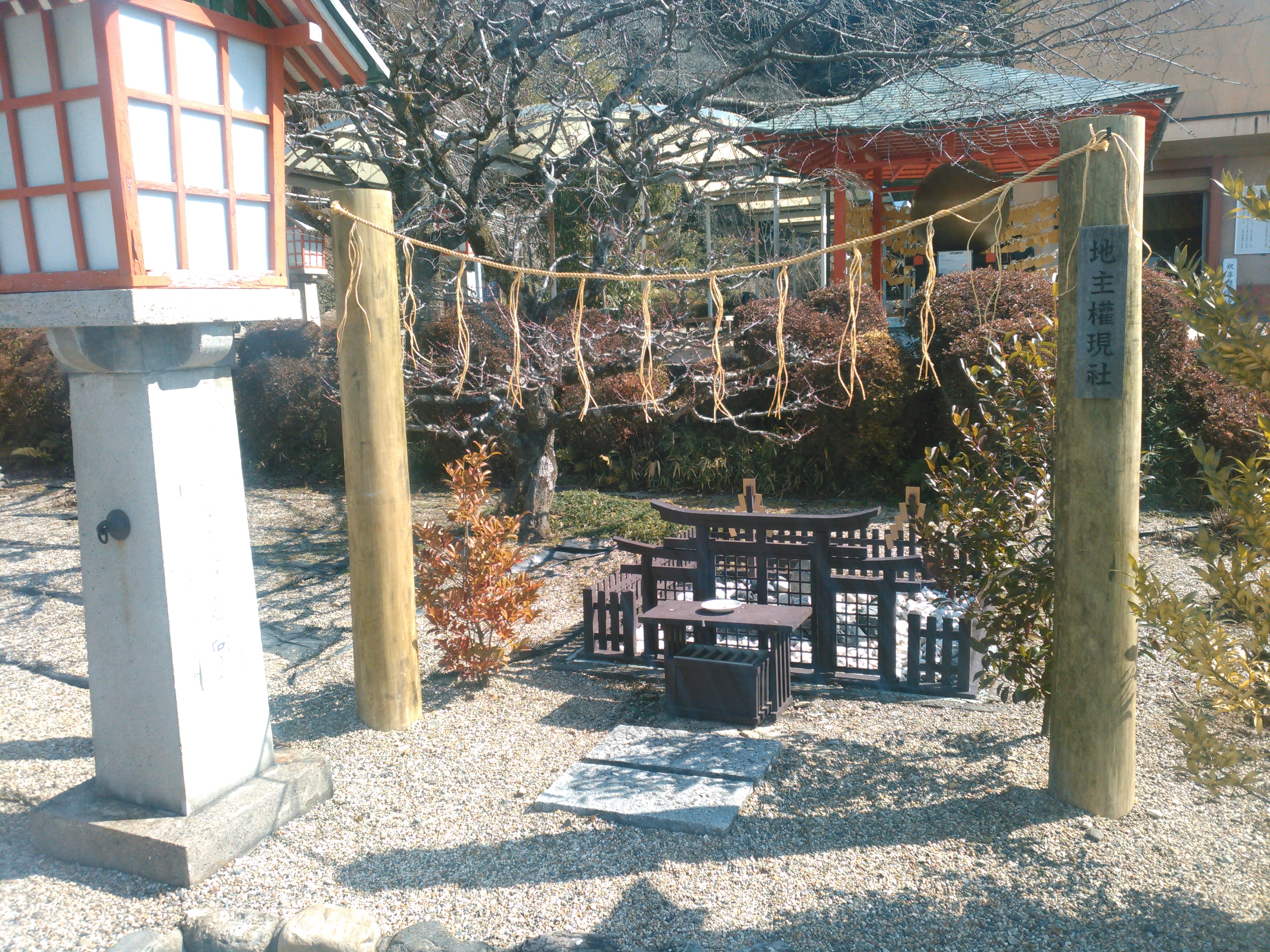
Shrine to local earth entity

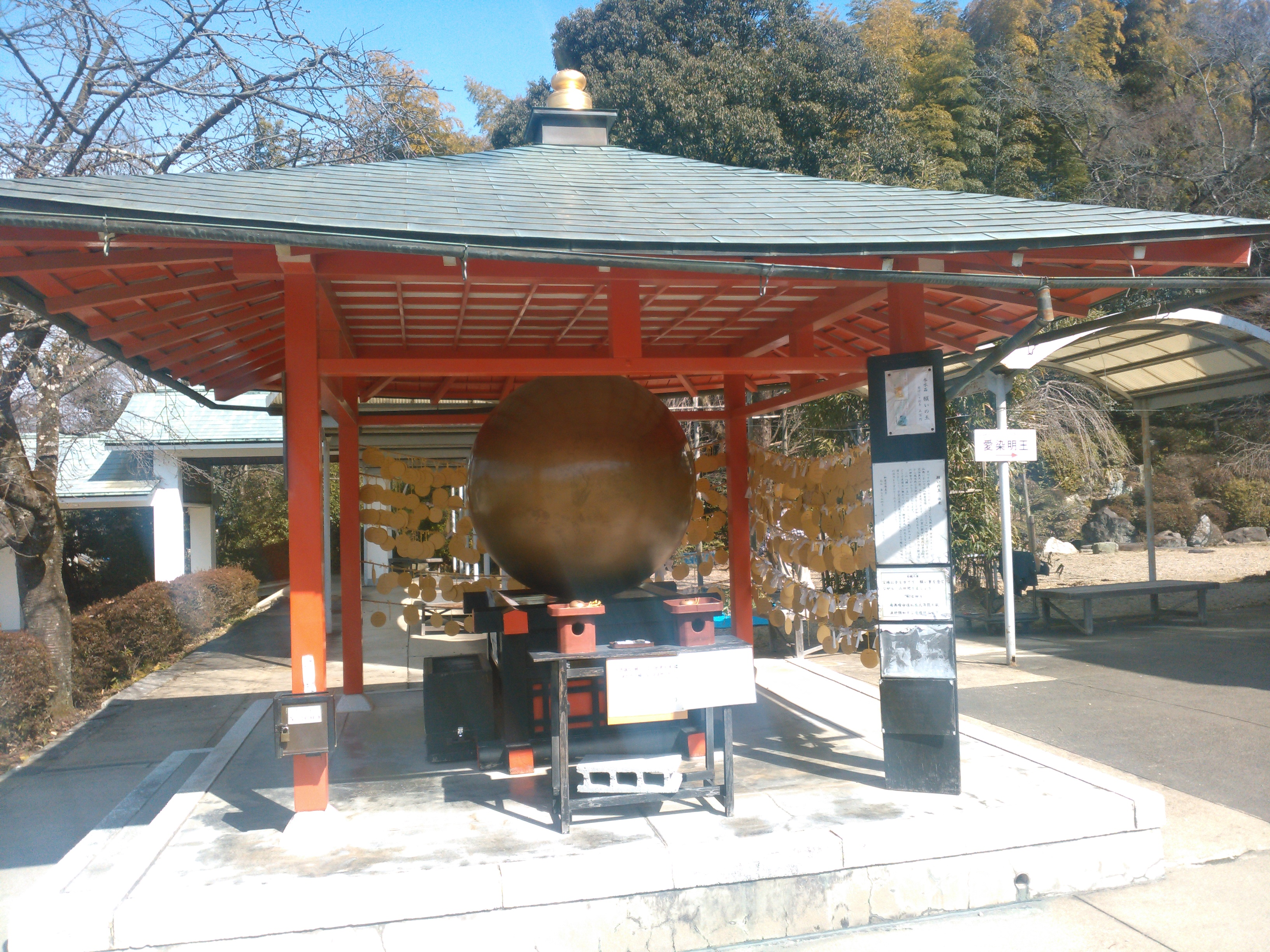
Negai no Tama (Wishing Ball)

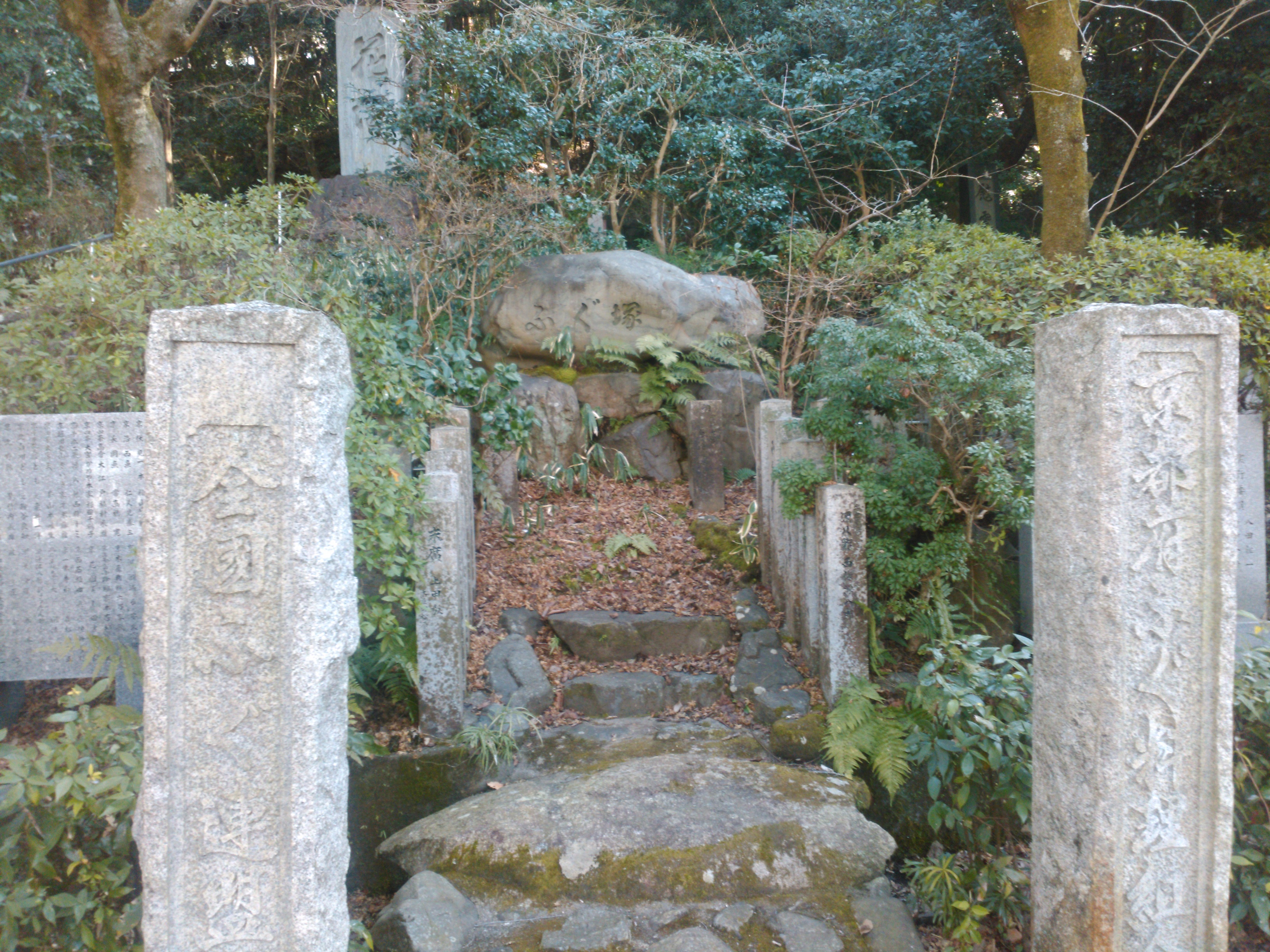
Pufferfish Tumulus

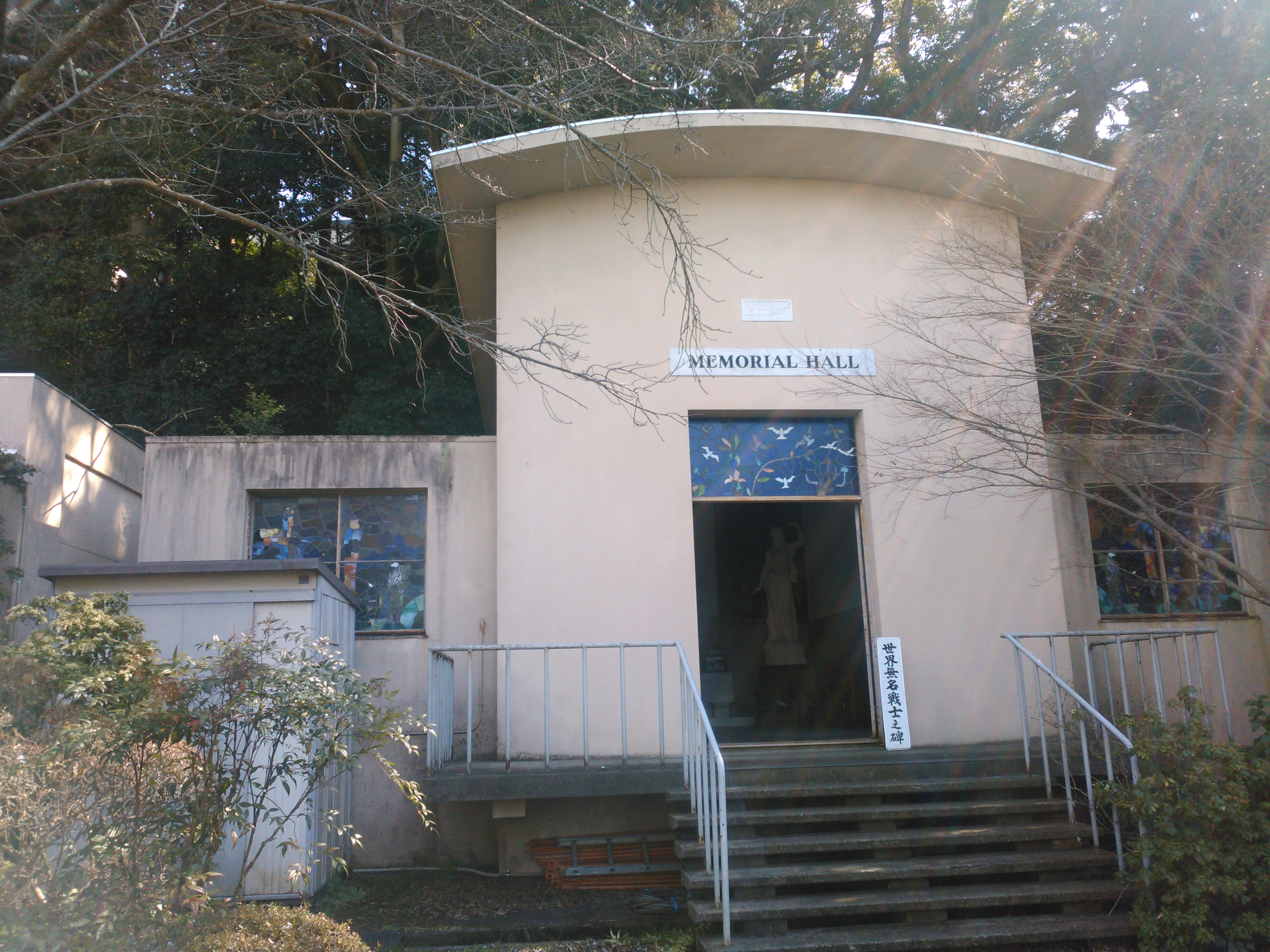
Memorial to the Unknown Soldier

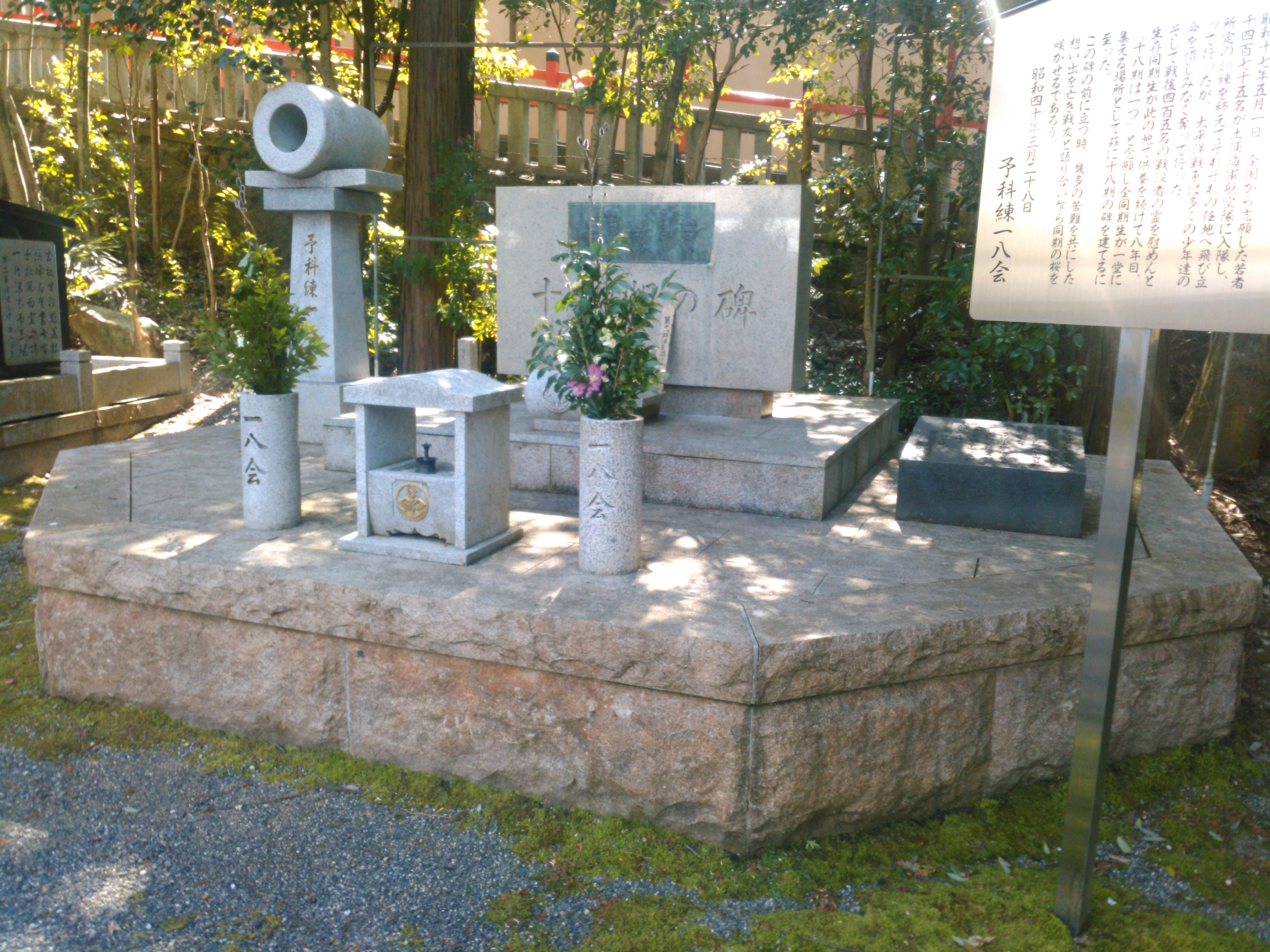
Memorial to the 18th Class of Naval Aviator Cadets

== See also ==
- Tomb of the Unknown Soldier
