= Kuksaroy Presidential Palace =

Presidential residence in Uzbekistan

Coordinates: 41.35833°N 69.40583°E

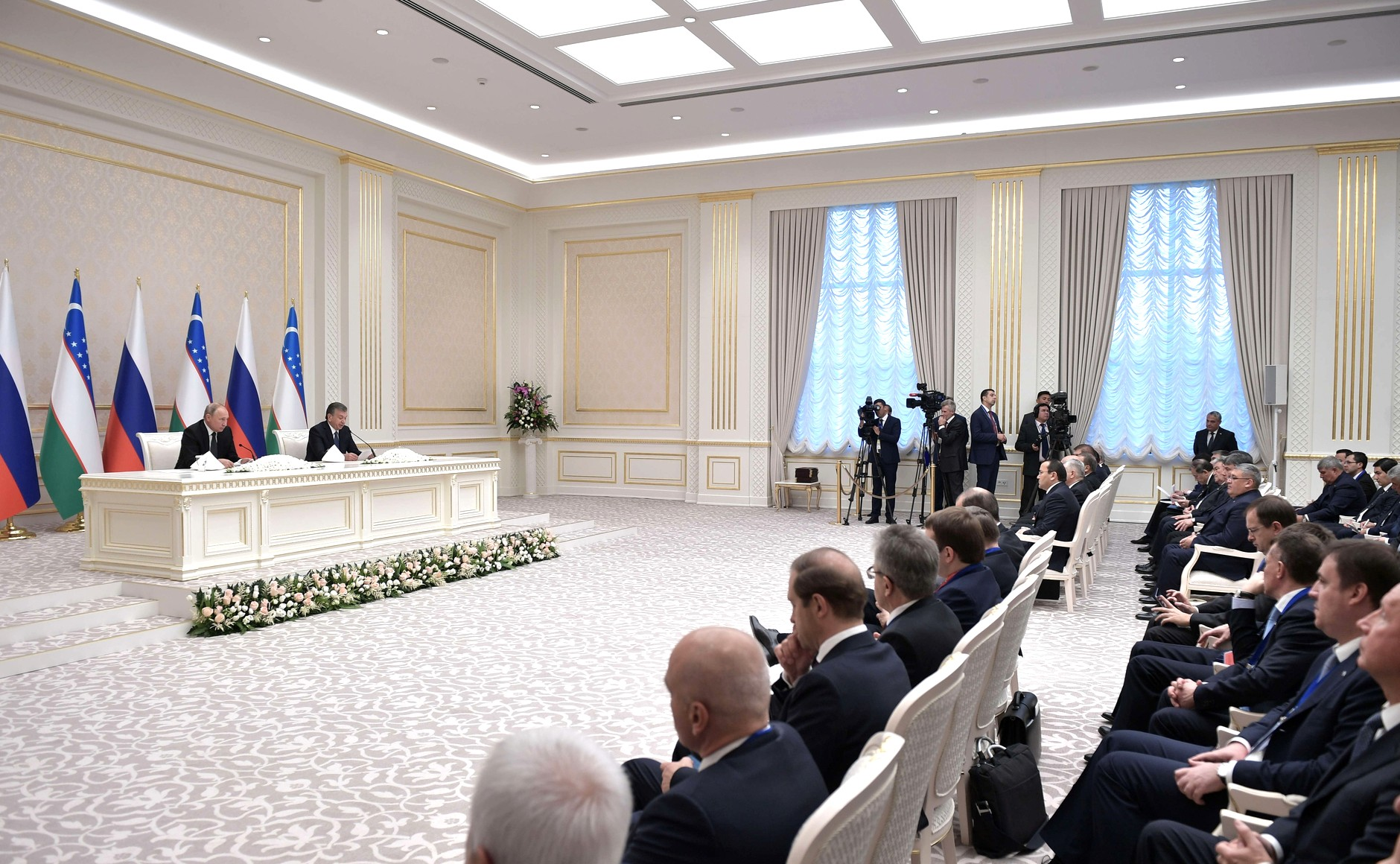
- Russian President Vladimir Putin and Uzbek President Shavkat Mirziyoyev at the palace in October 2018
- Interactive map of the Kuksaroy Presidential Palace area

General information
- Status: Active
- Location: Buyuk Ipak Yoli, Tashkent, Uzbekistan
- Current tenants: Shavkat Mirziyoyev, President of Uzbekistan
- Construction started: Mid-1990s

Design and construction
- Developer: Government of Uzbekistan
- The nearest metro is Buyuk Ipak Yoli.

Kuksaroy Presidential Palace (Uzbek: Koʻksaroy/Кўксарой, Russian: Куксарой), meaning the Blue Palace in English, is currently the official workplace of the President of Uzbekistan. It is located in the northeastern Mirzo Ulugbek District of Tashkent.

== History ==
Kuksaroy Palace was built in the 1990s, and under former President Islam Karimov, who served from 1991 to 2016. The palace was used as his suburban mansion, with Oqsaroy Palace in the city center acting as the seat of the executive branch in the country. During the Karimov presidency, it was used to receive the leaders of foreign states as well as hold ceremonial receptions for those leaders in the courtyard of the palace. This changed between 2016 and 2017 when newly elected President Mirziyoyev converted Oqsaroy Palace into a museum in honor of late president Karimov. Mirziyoyev himself temporarily moved to the building of the Senate of the Oliy Majlis, before then relocating his residence to Kuksaroy Palace. A directorate for the improvement of the Kuksaroy Palace was created under the Tashkent City Administration in October 2020. It receives more than 2 billion Uzbek soum for the purchase of transport and special equipment from the local budget of the capital.

== Security at the palace ==
It is one of the most protected and guarded places in Uzbekistan. The building and the surrounding area are closely guarded around the clock and tightly by the presidential guards represented by well-armed servicemen of the State Security Service of the President of the Republic of Uzbekistan, as well as employees of the Ministry of Internal Affairs and troops of the National Guard.

== Areas ==
There is an Alley of Honorary Guests, where many world leaders, including Kyrgyz President Sadyr Japarov have planted fir trees.

== Gallery ==
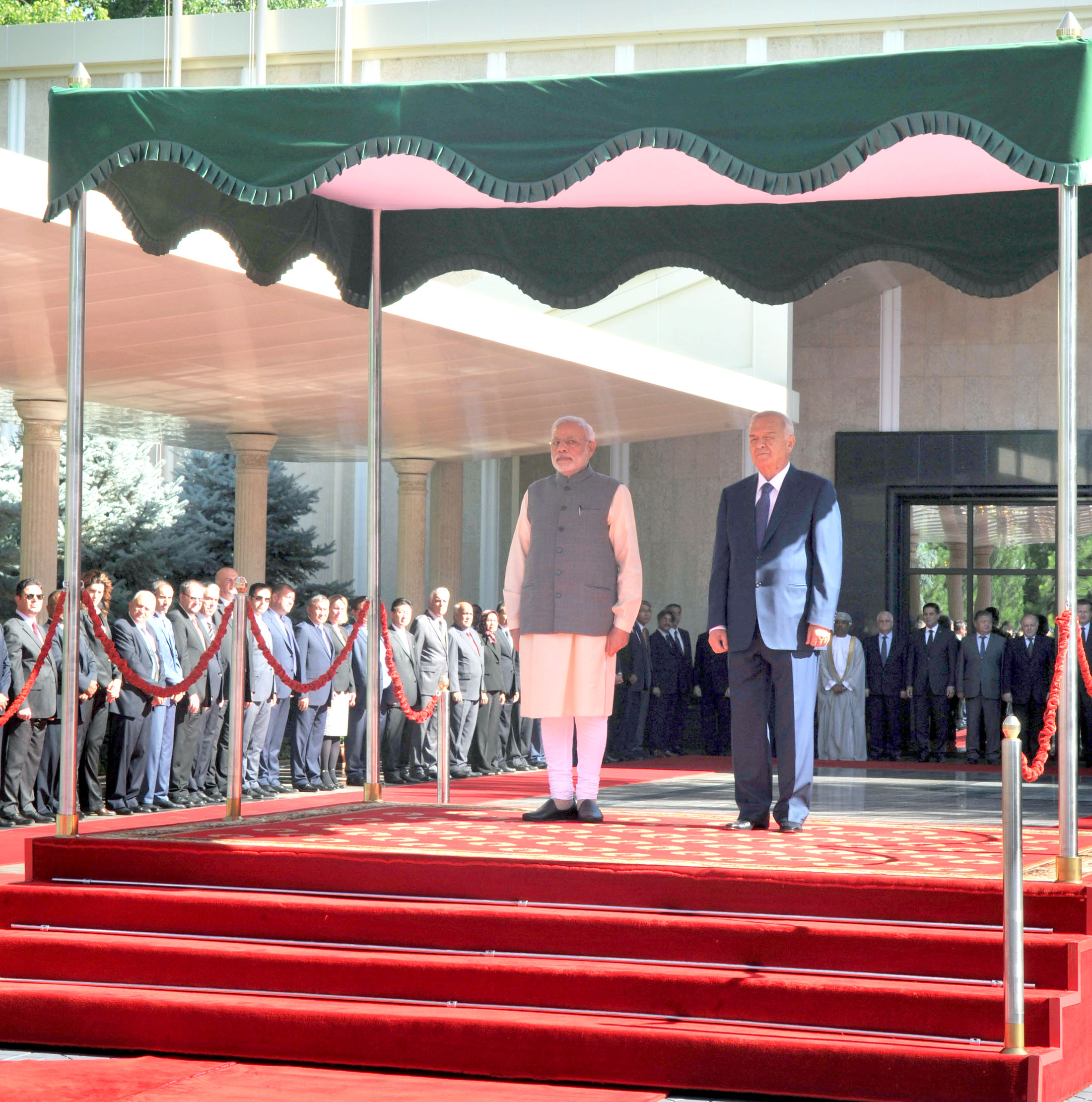
A welcoming ceremony for Indian Prime Minister Narendra Modi at the palace.

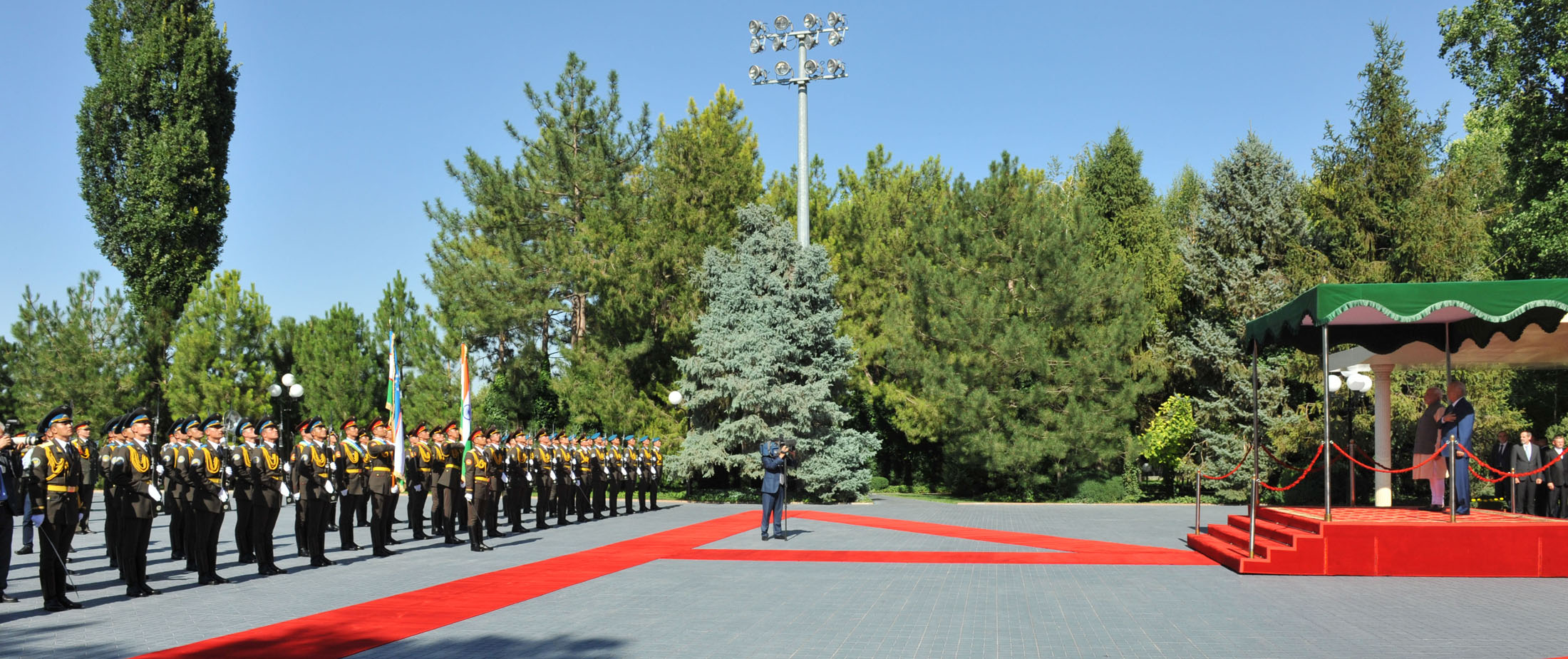
A guard of honour formed by the Armed Forces of Uzbekistan at the forecourt of the residence.

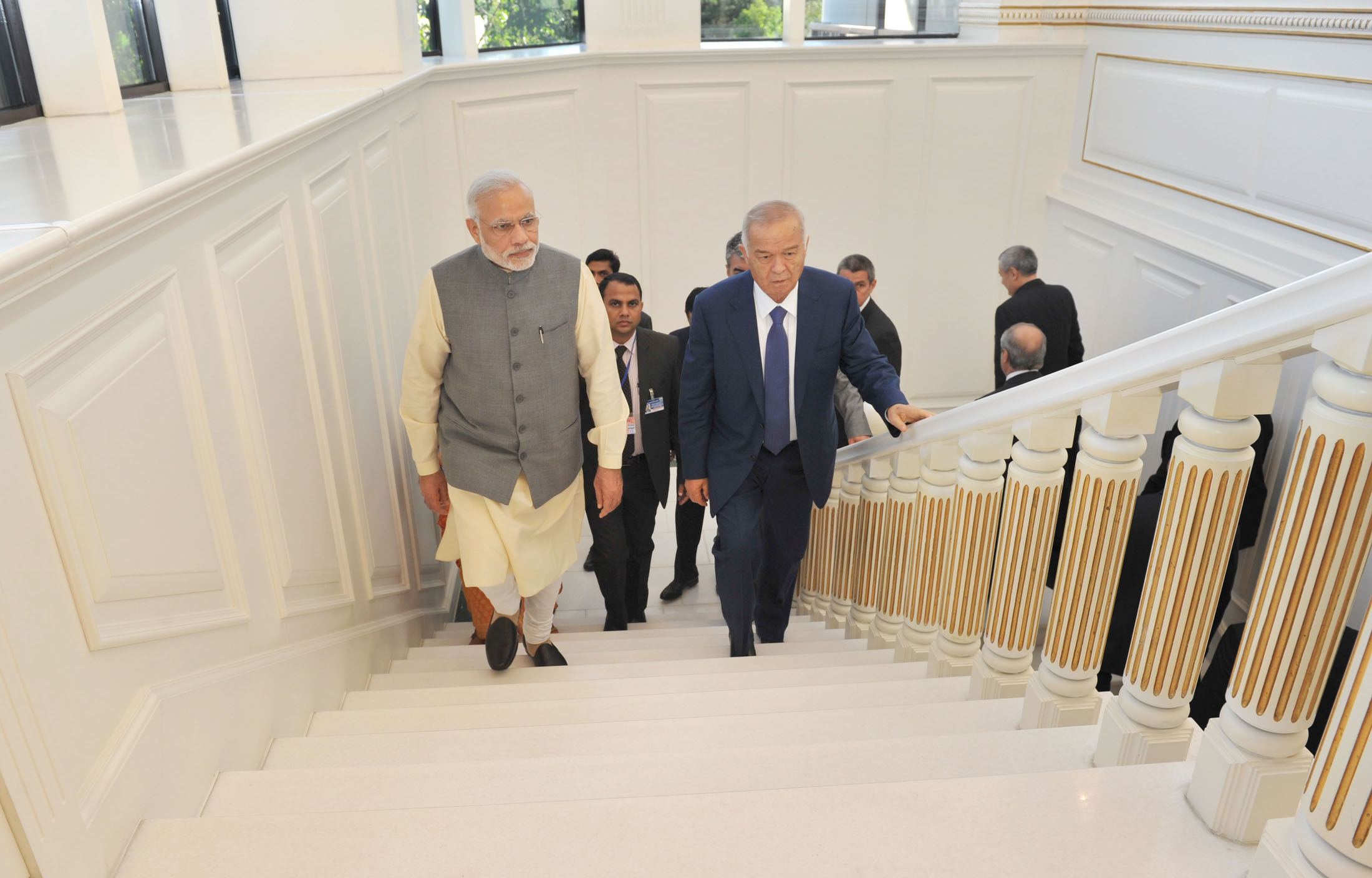
The interior of the palace

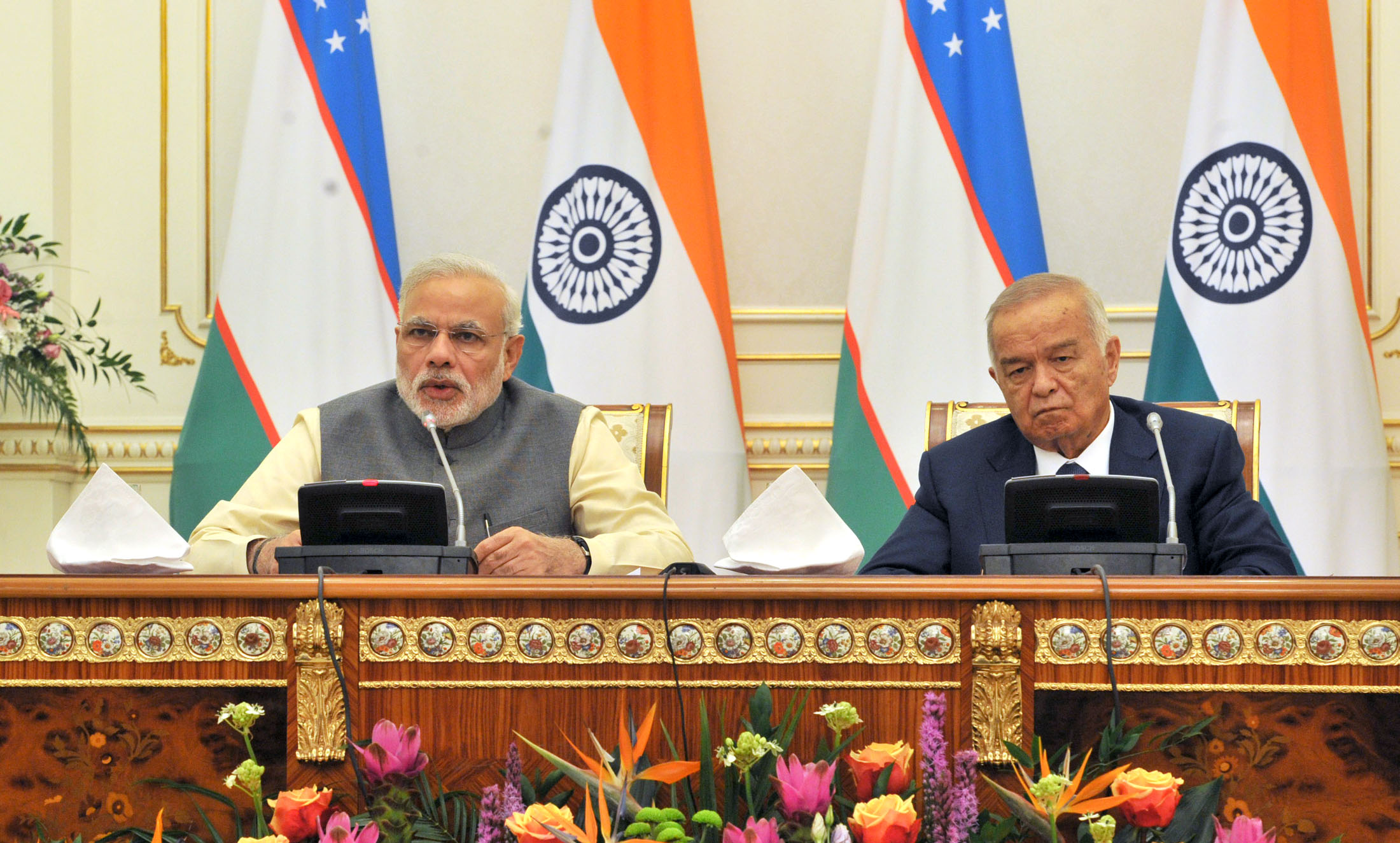
Islam Karimov and Narendra Modi in the press room.

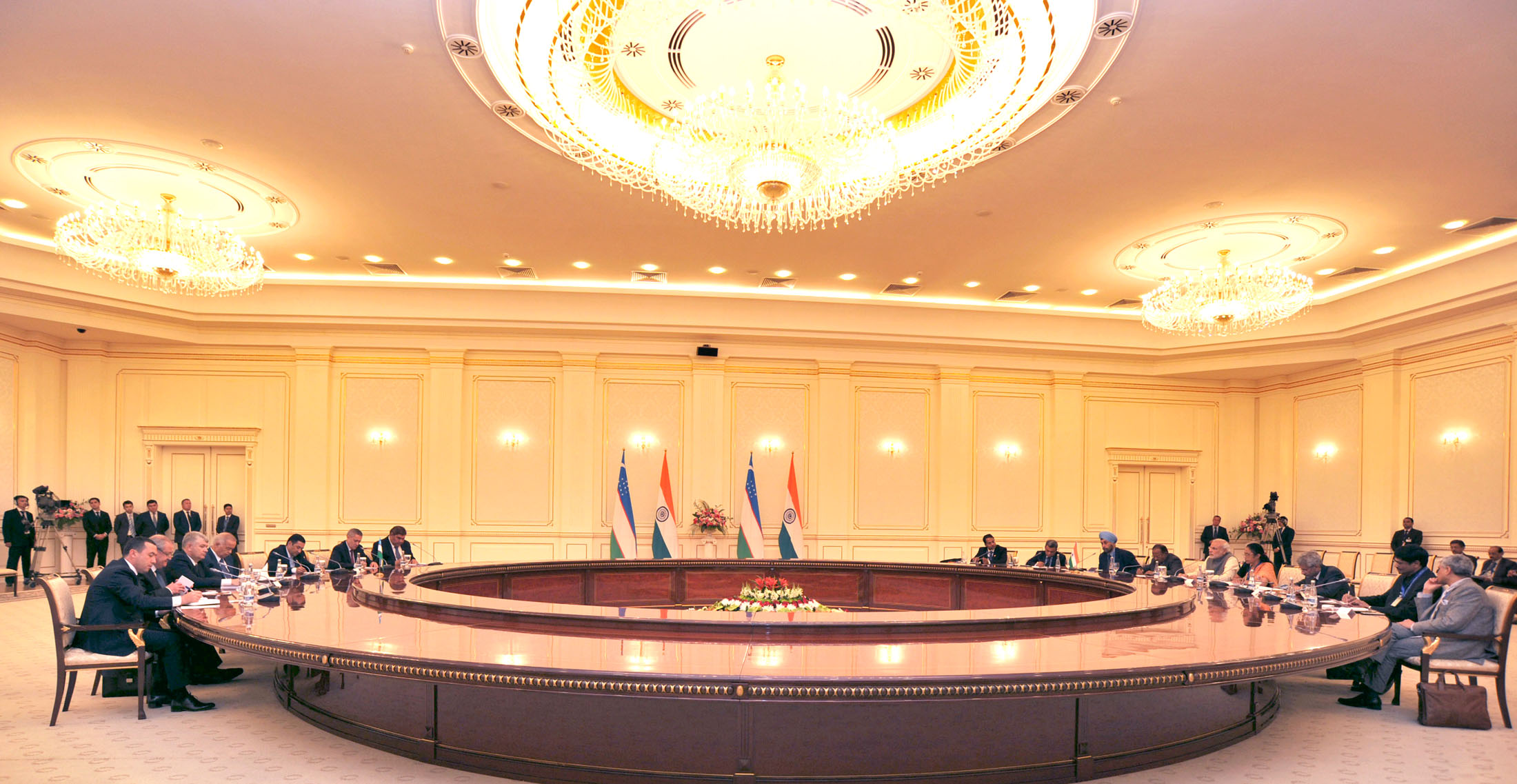
A conference room

== See also ==
- Monument to the First President of Uzbekistan
- Turkiston Palace
- President of Uzbekistan
- Ok Saroy Presidential Palace
- Presidential palace
- Romanov Palace
