= Monument to the Independence of Uzbekistan =

- Mustaqillik va ezgulik monumenti (Uzbek)
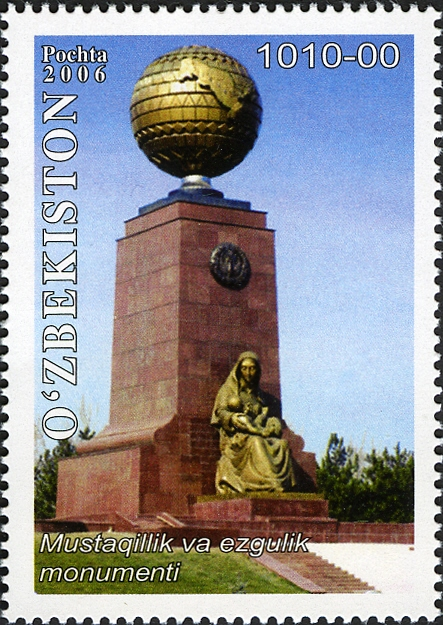
- A 2006 stamp depicting the monument
- Interactive map of Monument to the Independence of Uzbekistan
- Location: Mustaqillik Maydoni, Tashkent, Uzbekistan
- Coordinates: 41°18′59″N 69°16′00″E
- Designer: Sabir Adylov and Nikolai Tomsky
- Type: National Monument
- Material: bronze, metal
- Beginning date: 1974
- Completion date: February 3, 2006
- Opening date: 1992; 34 years ago
- Dedicated to: The Independence of Uzbekistan

The Monument to the Independence of Uzbekistan is a Tashkent monument made in honor of the independence of Uzbekistan. At the top of the monument is a metal sphere ornamented with an ornamental pattern, on which a map of Uzbekistan is depicted. Wreath-laying ceremonies are regularly held at the pedestal of the monument on national holidays and state visits.

== History ==
It was given its current name in the early 1990s, following its renaming from the monument to Vladimir Lenin, which was designed and created in 1974 by Sabir Adylov (1932–2002) and Nikolai Tomsky (1900–1984). In December 2005, during the architectural reconstruction of Mustaqillik Maydoni, the monument was given an additional sculpture, depicting a "Happy Mother" with her baby. By decree of President of Uzbekistan Islam Karimov on February 3, 2006, the newly renovated monument would be renamed to the Monument of Independence and Humanism.

The symbolism of the monument, nicknamed the "globe of Uzbekistan", influenced the monumental art of Uzbekistan in the 1990s–2000s. It was reproduced on posters, murals and sculptures in different Uzbek cities.

== Gallery ==
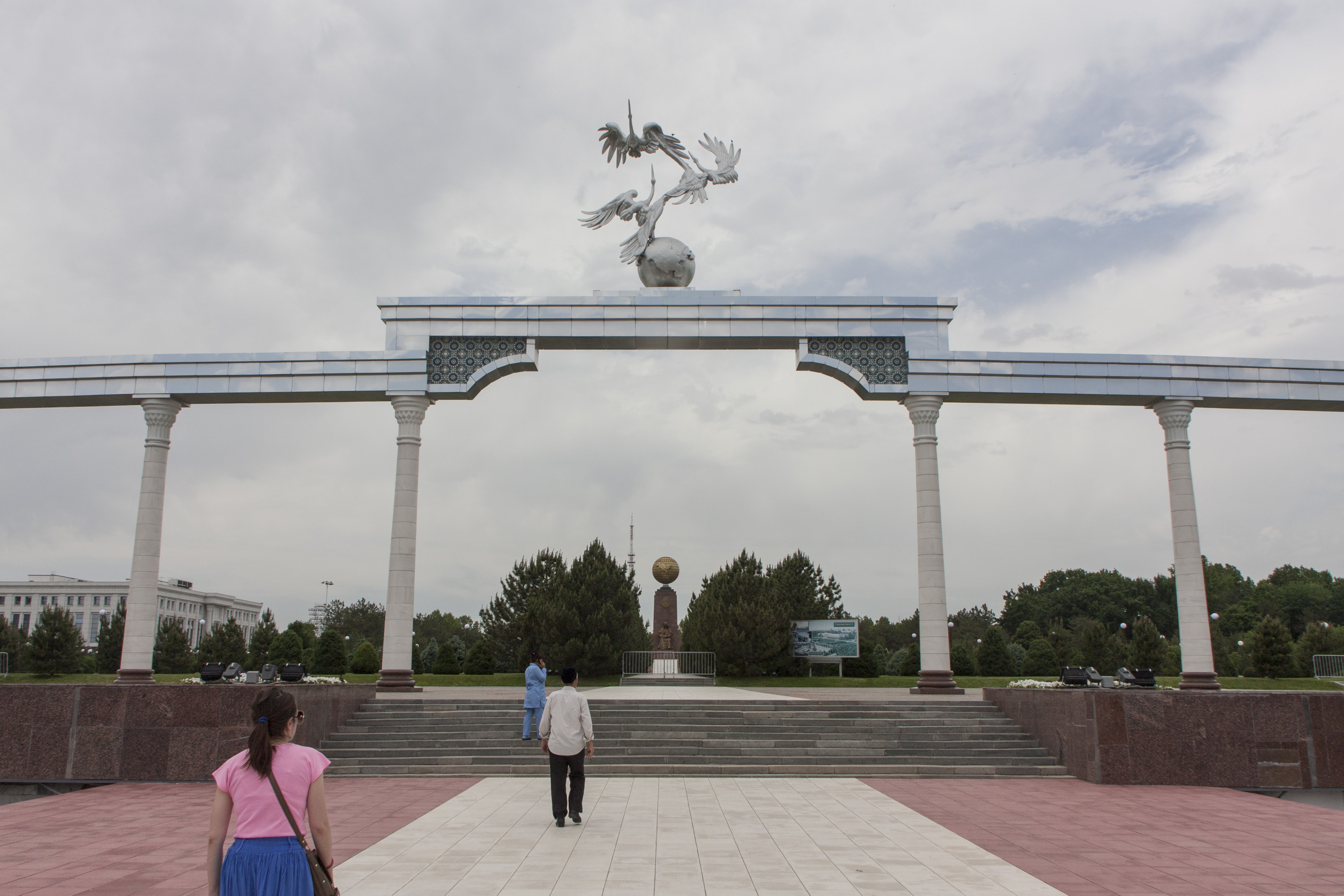

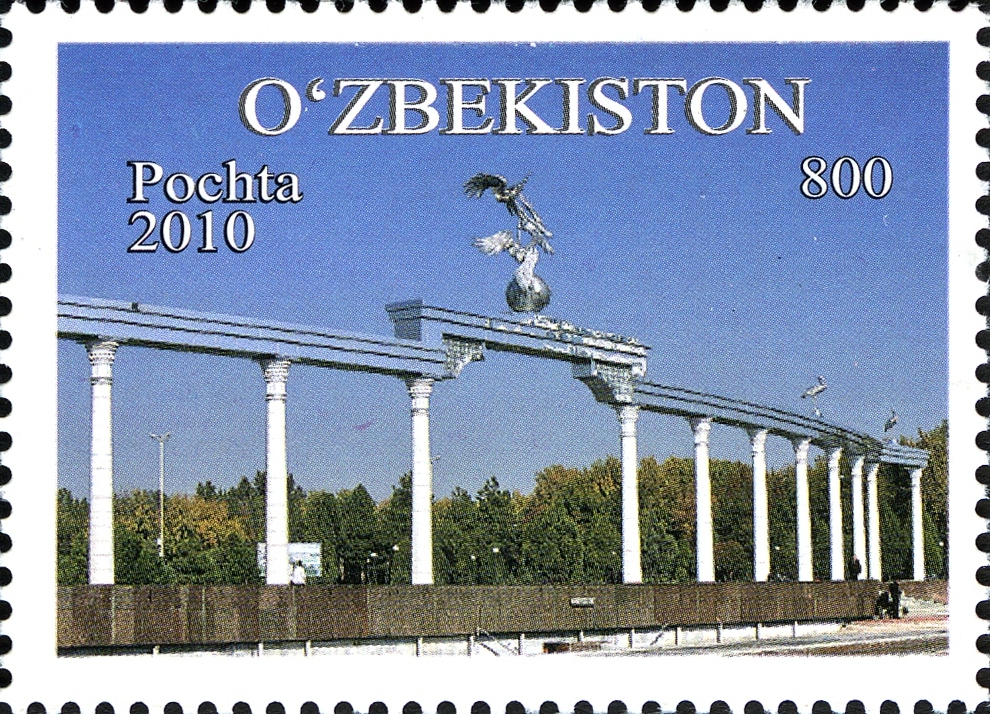

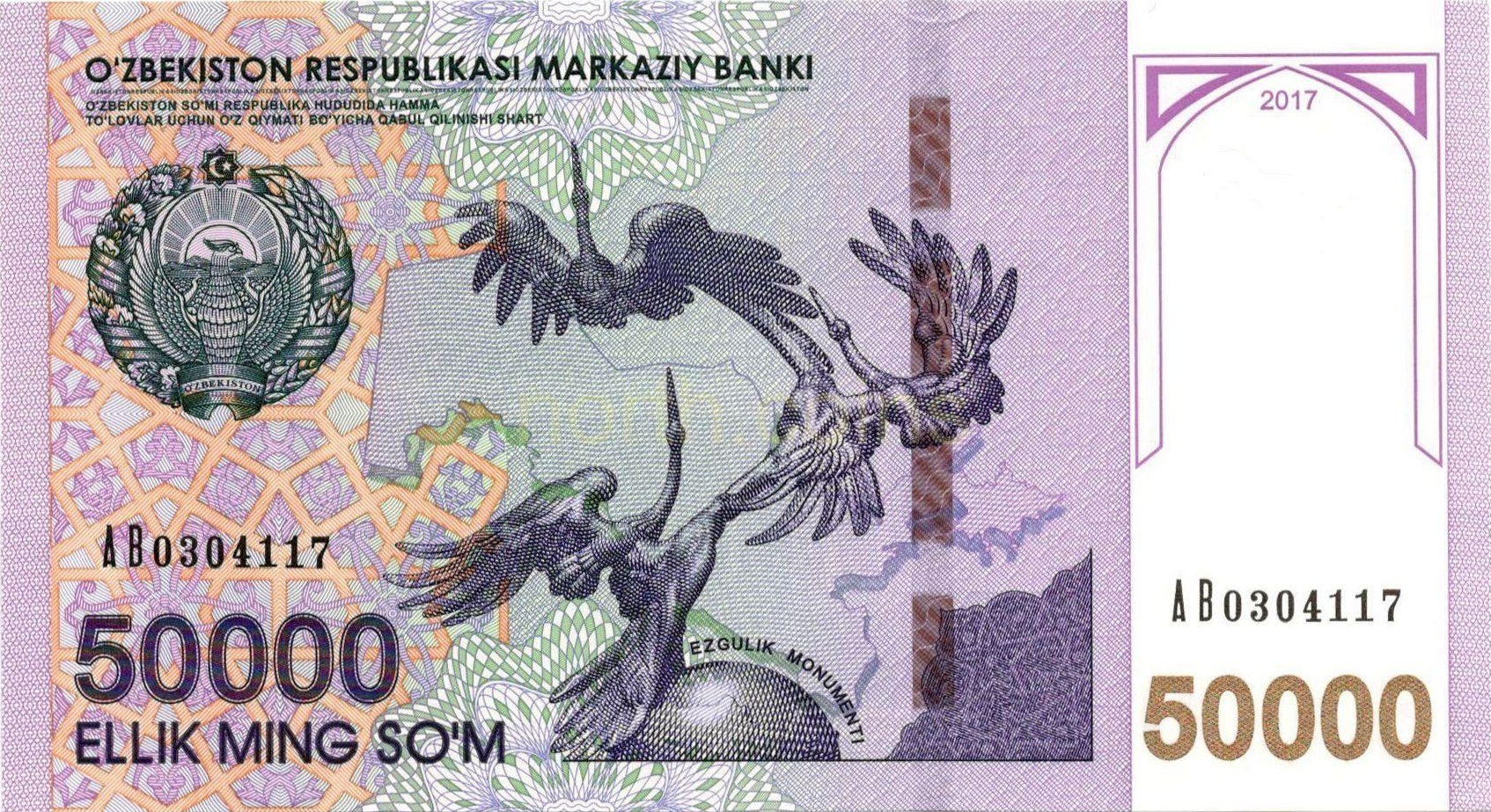

== See also ==
For similar monuments, see:

- Eartha (Yarmouth)
- Globe of Peace (Pesaro)
- Unisphere (New York City)

For similar attractions in Tashkent, see:

- Monument to the First President of Uzbekistan
- Mustaqillik Maydoni
- Ok Saroy Presidential Palace
- Shota Rustaveli Street, Tashkent
- Turkiston Palace
