= Usta Shirin Murodov =

Soviet Uzbek artist (1879–1957)

- Born: 18 August 1879; Bukhara, Emirate of Bukhara, Russian Empire
- Died: 12 February 1957 (aged 77); Tashkent, Uzbek SSR, USSR
- Resting place: Chigatoy cemetery, Tashkent, Uzbekistan
- Occupations: Painter, potter
- Style: Ornament (art), ganch carving
- Awards: State Stalin Prize 1st class (1948)

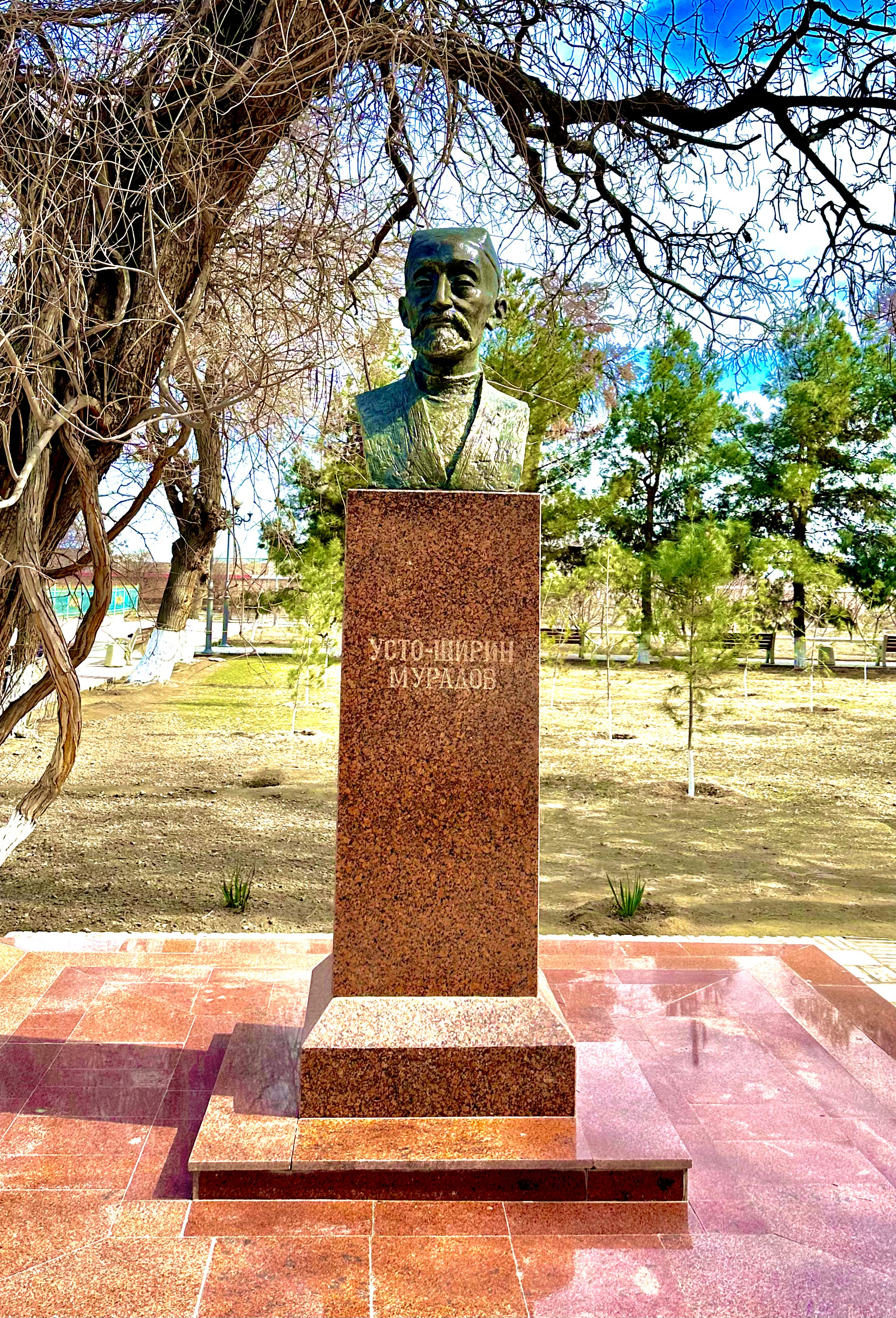
Bust of Usta-Shirin Muradov at the summer residence of the Emir of Bukhara

Usta Shirin Murodov (was born on August 18, 1879, Bukhara, Bukhara Emirate – December 2, 1957, Tashkent, Uzbek SSR, USSR) was a Soviet Uzbek master artist – a painter, pottery craftsman, and folklorist.

Murodov was an honorary member of the Academy of Sciences of Uzbekistan SSR and a distinguished artist recognized for his contributions to the art in the Uzbek SSR in 1943. He was also a recipient of the State Stalin Prize in 1948.

== Biography ==
Shirin learned his craft from his father, Master Murod, and his grandfather, Master Nosir. He started practicing art from a young age and learned the skill from his family. As an independent artist, he participated in the decoration of the Karmana Palace of the Emir of Bukhara and the White Hall of the Sitorai Mokhi-Khosa summer palace, where he gained recognition. In his artistic creations, Shirin was particularly known for his pottery craftsmanship. He used traditional patterns and shapes in new and innovative ways and the ganch technology he created was also used in the renovation of the Romanov Palace. In his early work, he used pottery as a canvas for his artwork, creating stunning and intricate pottery pieces

Usta Shirin also decorated many clubs, public buildings, and memorial structures with his pottery works. He adorned various venues, including the Uzbek SSR Pavilion at the All-Union Agricultural Exhibition, the pavilions of the Turkmenistan SSR (1938), the Tashkent Circus, the Navoi Theater (Bukhara Hall), the Muqimi Theater, The Alisher Navoi State Museum of Literature, and others. He also contributed to the restoration of historical monuments, including the ruined part of the Samanid Mausoleum, the Mir Arab Madrasa, the Abdulaziz Khan Madrasah domes, and the minarets in front of the Magok-i-Attari Mosque.

=== Death ===
Usta Shirin died on 12 February 1957, and was buried in the Chigatoy cemetery in Tashkent.

== Awards ==
- Stalin Prize 1st class (1948)
- Honored Artist of the Uzbek SSR (1943)
- Order of Lenin (16 January 1950)
- Order of the Red Banner of Labor
- various other medals
- Honorary Member of the Academy of Sciences of the Uzbek SSR (1943)
- Order of Outstanding Merit (22 August 2001)

== See also ==
- Abdugani Abdullayev
- Mirumar Asadov
