= Museum of Olympic Glory =

Museum in Tashkent, Uzbekistan

- Olimpiya shon-shuhrati muzeyi
- Established: 1 September 1996
- Location: Tashkent, Uzbekistan
- Coordinates: 41.3246°N 69.2712°E
- Founder: Islam Karimov

Museum of Olympic Glory (Uzbek: Olimpiya shon-shuhrati muzeyi) is a museum in Tashkent, dedicated to the Olympic movement. The museum opened on 1 September 1996, on the fifth anniversary of Uzbekistan's independence.

== History ==
The museum was established by Uzbekistan's Cabinet of Ministers on 14 August 1966, with the opening ceremony, which was attended by President of the Republic of Uzbekistan, Islam Karimov and President of the International Olympic Committee, Juan Antonio Samaranch, taking place on 1 September 1996, the fifth anniversary of Uzbekistan's independence.

The main goal of the Museum of Olympic Glory is the organization of exhibitions of exhibits demonstrating achievements of Uzbek athletes at the Olympic Games. The museum holds a collection of over 2000 exhibits, of which around 1000 are on display at any one time. The museum is spread over two floors, and has a total of 2700 square meters of exhibition space. The first floor of the museum is known as the "Hall of Glory", displaying the achievements of Uzbek medallists, and the second floor of the museum shows a general history of the Olympics. The museum has a video library, which contains videos of the Olympic Games. Items on display include medals won by Uzbek athletes, photographs of important Olympic moments, the sports kits of renowned athletes, and documents detailing the history of the Olympics in Uzbekistan. Also on display are gold medals for contribution to the development of the sports movement which Islam Karimov sent to the museum.
