= Independence Day (Uzbekistan) =

Uzbekistani national holiday

Independence Day of the Republic of Uzbekistan
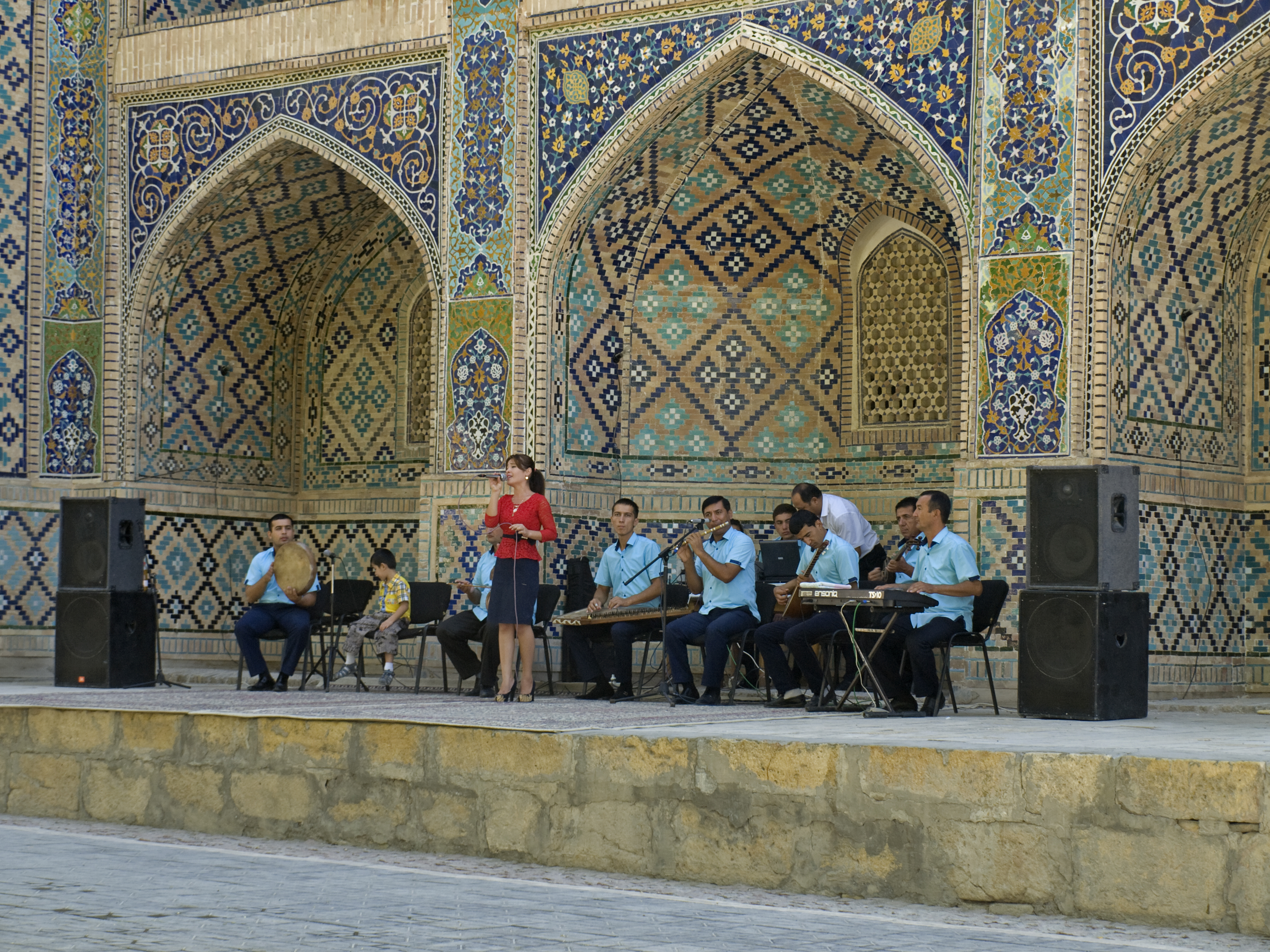
- A musical performance on the occasion of the Independence Day 2015, Bukhara
- Official name: Uzbek: Oʻzbekiston Respublikasi Mustaqilligi kuni
- Also called: Independence Day
- Observed by: Uzbekistan
- Type: State
- Significance: The day Uzbekistan gained its independence from the USSR
- Celebrations: Fireworks, concerts, parades
- Date: 1 September
- Next time: 1 September 2027
- Frequency: Annual

Independence Day (Uzbek: Oʻzbekiston Respublikasi Mustaqilligi kuni) is an official national holiday in Uzbekistan, celebrated on the first of September. fireworks, concerts, competitions, military parades, and wreath laying ceremonies are held in Tashkent during the independence day celebrations.

== Background ==
In 1991, the August Coup in the Soviet capital of Moscow caused many Soviet republics to declare their independence from the Soviet Union. President of the Uzbek SSR, Islam Karimov declared Uzbekistan independent from the USSR on 31 August 1991. That same day, the Supreme Soviet of Uzbekistan adopted a resolution on the declaration of independence of the Republic of Uzbekistan and a law on the state independence of Uzbekistan. Once the laws were signed by Karimov, the Uzbek SSR was renamed to the Republic of Uzbekistan. The next day was then declared a national holiday, and a day off from work by the government.

== Celebratory history ==
=== 1992 ===
In 1992, Independence Day was celebrated for the first time. The film Istiqlol (Independence) directed by Davron Salimov was shown in cinemas in Tashkent. President Islam Karimov delivered a speech at the evening event on Independence Square in the Uzbek capital.

=== 1996 ===
It honoured the 5th anniversary of independence. It was on this year that President Karimov awarded the title of Hero of Uzbekistan for the first time.

=== 2016 ===
2016 celebrated the 25th jubilee anniversary of independence. Uzbek President Islam Karimov, who was hospitalized during the anniversary, would pass away in Tashkent the next day. Karimov's annual independence day speech was read on TV by a presenter.

=== 2018 ===
On the eve of the 27th anniversary of independence in 2018, government authorities for the first time decided not impose restrictions on the admission of citizens of Tajikistan at the border crossings.

=== 2021 ===
2021 saw celebrations in honor of the 30th anniversary of independence, the main celebrations of which were held in the newly created Yangi Uzbekiston Park and a settlement adjacent to Tashkent. The 30th Anniversary Monument, funded by a Turkish company, was opened on the date.

== Places in Uzbekistan honoring independence day ==
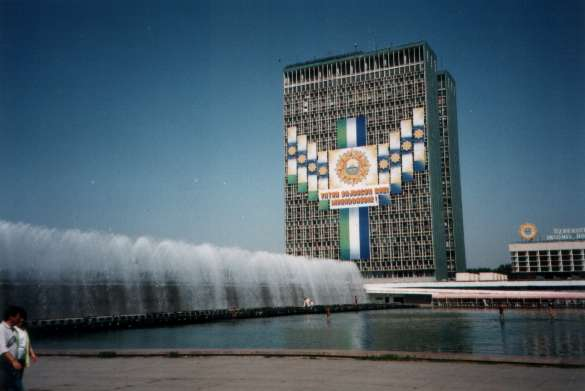
The decorated building of the Ministry of Finance in honor of independence day.

- Mustaqillik Maydoni
- Monument to the Independence of Uzbekistan
- Independence Library

== See also ==
- Mustaqillik Maydoni
