= Turkiston Palace =

- (Uzbek): Turkiston Saroyi (Russian): Дворец Туркестана
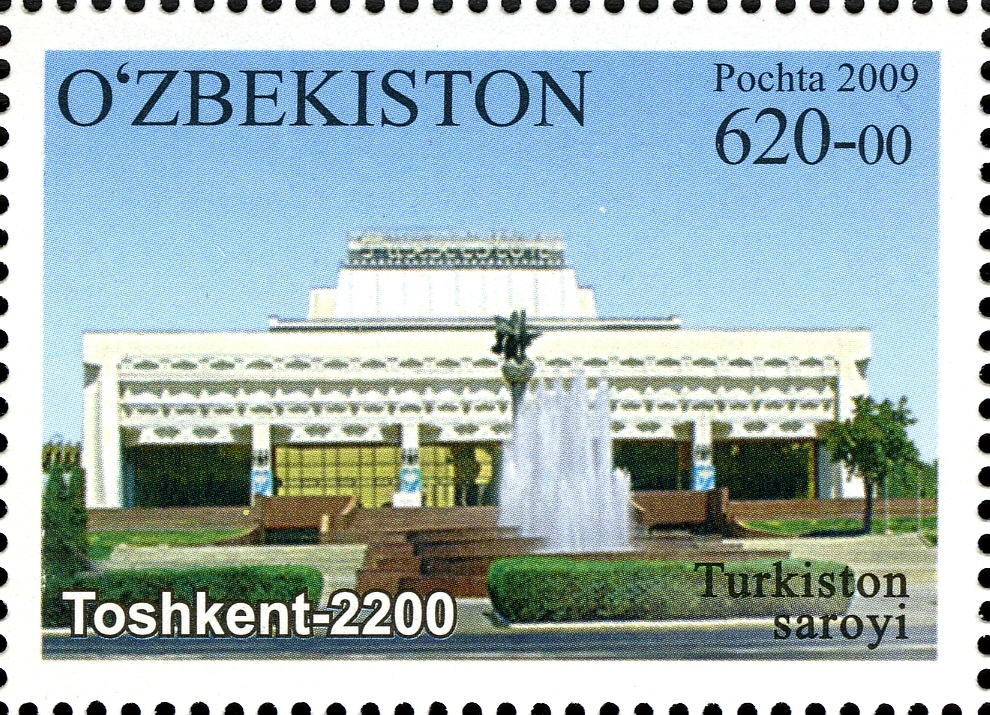
- A stamp depicting Turkiston Palace
- Interactive map of the Turkiston Palace area

General information
- Status: open
- Location: Tashkent, Uzbekistan
- Coordinates: 41.3209°N 69.2695°E
- Construction started: 1993

Turkiston Palace (Uzbek: Turkiston Saroyi) is an arts venue in the capital city of Tashkent in Uzbekistan. It was opened on the initiative of the President of Uzbekistan Islam Karimov in 1993 in honor of the second anniversary of the Independence of Uzbekistan. The building of the palace, prior to Uzbek independence, lacked funding for many years and was in a state of "long-term construction". On March 30, 1993, by resolution of the Cabinet of Ministers of Uzbekistan, it was decided to name the new Palace "Turkiston". In January 2004, the palace was placed under the jurisdiction of the Tashkent City Administration, and in February 2017, the Palace was transferred to the Ministry of Culture by order of President Shavkat Mirziyoyev. It is the main venue for various public events including state holidays. Also, the embassies of many foreign countries hold national and cultural events, conferences, exhibitions, and contests in the palace. It has two main theatrical halls, the Winter Hall, and the Summer Amphitheater, each being made for the winter and summer respectively.

== See also ==
- Monument to the First President of Uzbekistan
- Ok Saroy Presidential Palace
- Romanov Palace
