= Mustaqillik Maydoni =

Square in Tashkent, Uzbekistan

Coordinates: 41°18′59″N 69°16′00″E

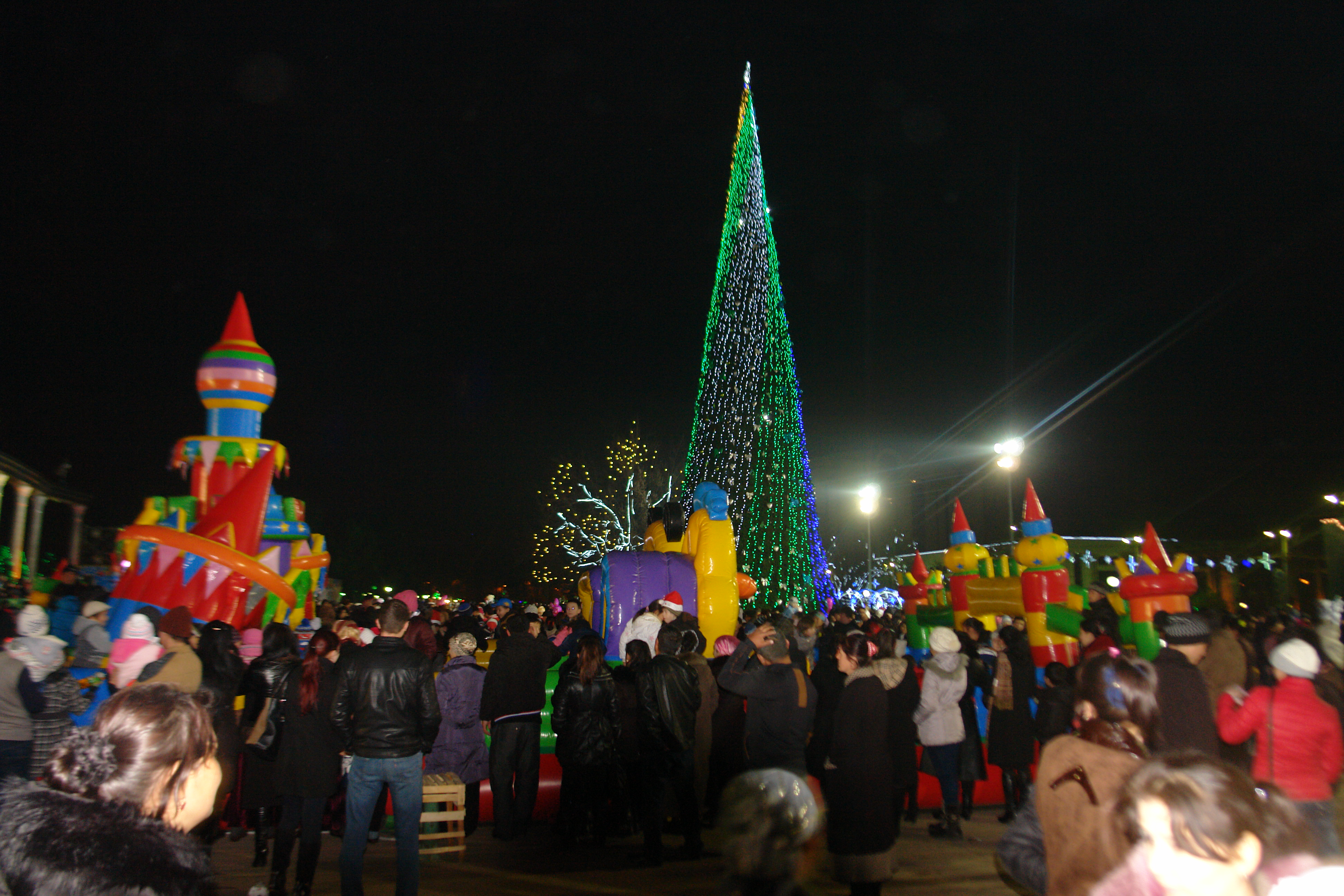
Independence Square in New Year 2015

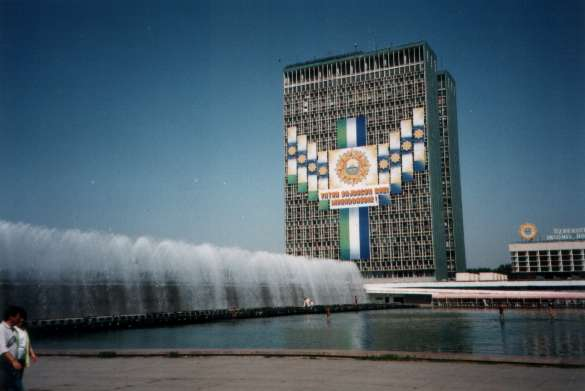

Independence Square (Uzbek: Mustaqillik Maydoni). is a central square of Tashkent, Uzbekistan.

== Introduction ==
After the proclamation of Uzbekistan's independence in September 1991, "Lenin Square" was renamed in 1992 as "Mustaqillik Maydoni", which translates to "Independence Square" in English. The monument to Lenin was dismantled, and in its place the Monument of Independence of Uzbekistan, in the form of the globe, was erected. Later, in front of the pedestal was set a figure of a woman, symbolising the Motherland.

Independence Square is now the central square of Tashkent; it hosts celebrations and military parades in the days of special events and public holidays.

== History ==
The largest square in Tashkent is more like a large park than a square. With several monuments and fountains, surrounded by impressive public buildings and filled with trees and flower beds, the Independence Square in Tashkent is a showcase of modern Uzbekistan.

Today the Independence History consists of several areas: administrative buildings, the recreation area with green zones and fountains, monuments including the Arch of Independence and the Independence Monument.

The story of the Independence square as a center of Tashkent goes back to more than hundred years. The General Governor of Turkestan built his military fortress in 1865. Since 1974 this place was called the Avenue of Parades, where military parades and demonstrations of workers were held to celebrate the holidays of May 1, International Workers Day, May 9 - Victory Day and November 7 - Revolution Day.

Passing through the arch of silver with figures of storks around the fountain, which marks the entrance to the Independence Square, one can see the main monument of the Independence square - the Independence Monument. It is a high pedestal with a golden globe erected on the top with a visual rendering of a map of Uzbekistan. Before the pedestal there is a statue of a seated mother with a baby in her arms. The monumental complex represent the revival of Uzbekistan as a free independent state. The Monument of Independence was erected in 1992, and the complete reconstruction of the area was completed in 2006.

On the opposite sits a statue depicting a mourning mother sadly looking down onto an eternal flame in memory of her children who fell when defending the country, to commemorate the fallen unidentified soldiers in the past World Wars.

Administrative buildings, including the Cabinet of Ministers, Senate of Uzbekistan and the Ministry of Finance are located on the western side of the Independence square in Tashkent.

== Areas inside Independence Square ==
- Ministry of Finance of Uzbekistan is almost inside of independence square and it is located left side of Independence Square.
- Memory and Honour Square is also inside the square but it is in the right bottom of independence square.
  - Tomb of the Unknown Soldier a monument to Soviet Soldiers in WWII within.
- Memory Lane is a place honoring Uzbek servicemen of the Soviet Armed Forces who fought during the Second World War. Names of servicemen who were killed in action are inscribed there.
- Arch of Ezgulik in English a word "Ezgulik" means that "Humanism" from the dictionary meaning and it means to people peacefulness.
- Ankhor River is medium river which crosses Independence Square.
- Monument to the Independence of Uzbekistan a monument made in honor of the independence of Uzbekistan.

== Photo gallery ==
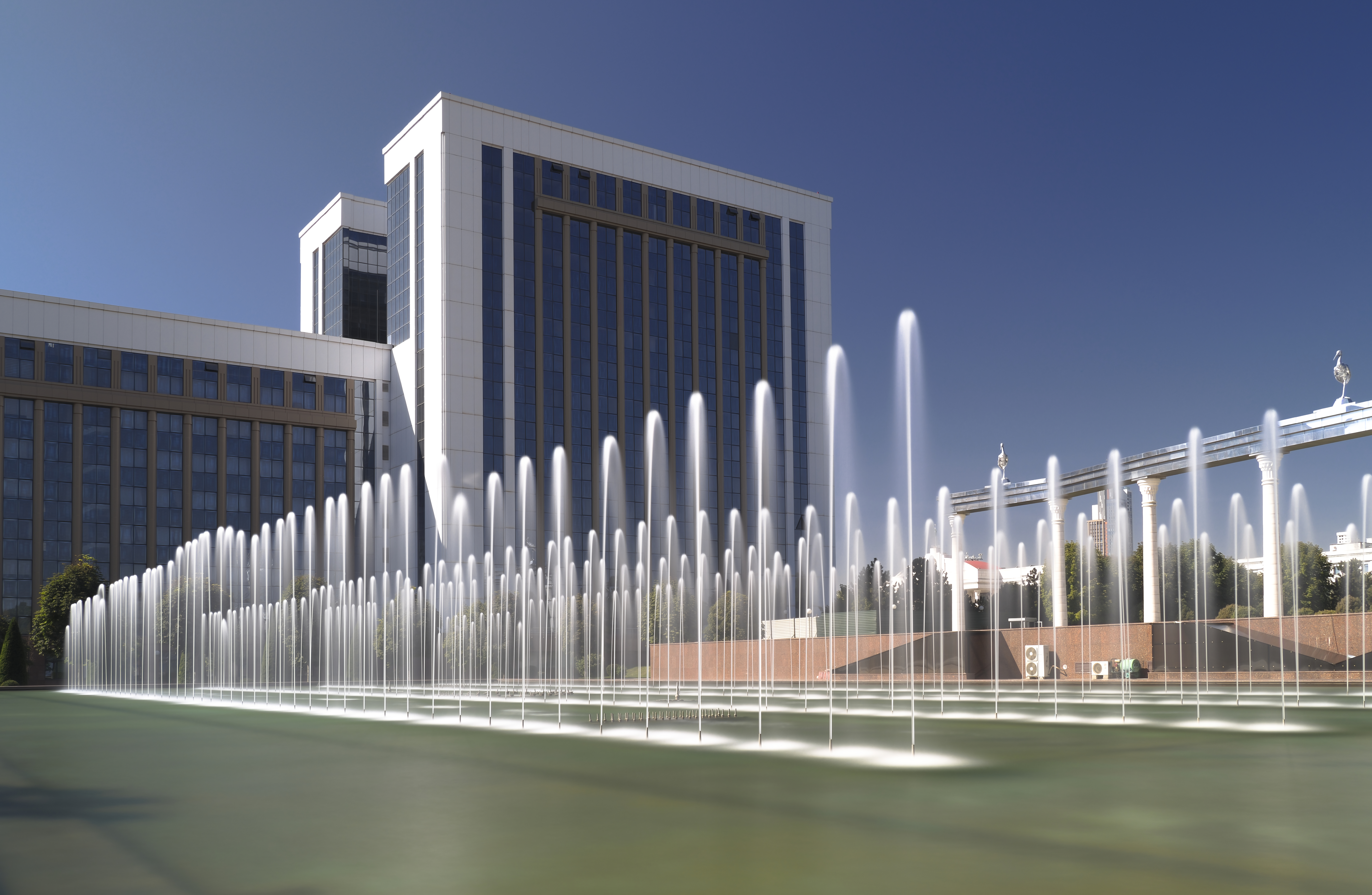

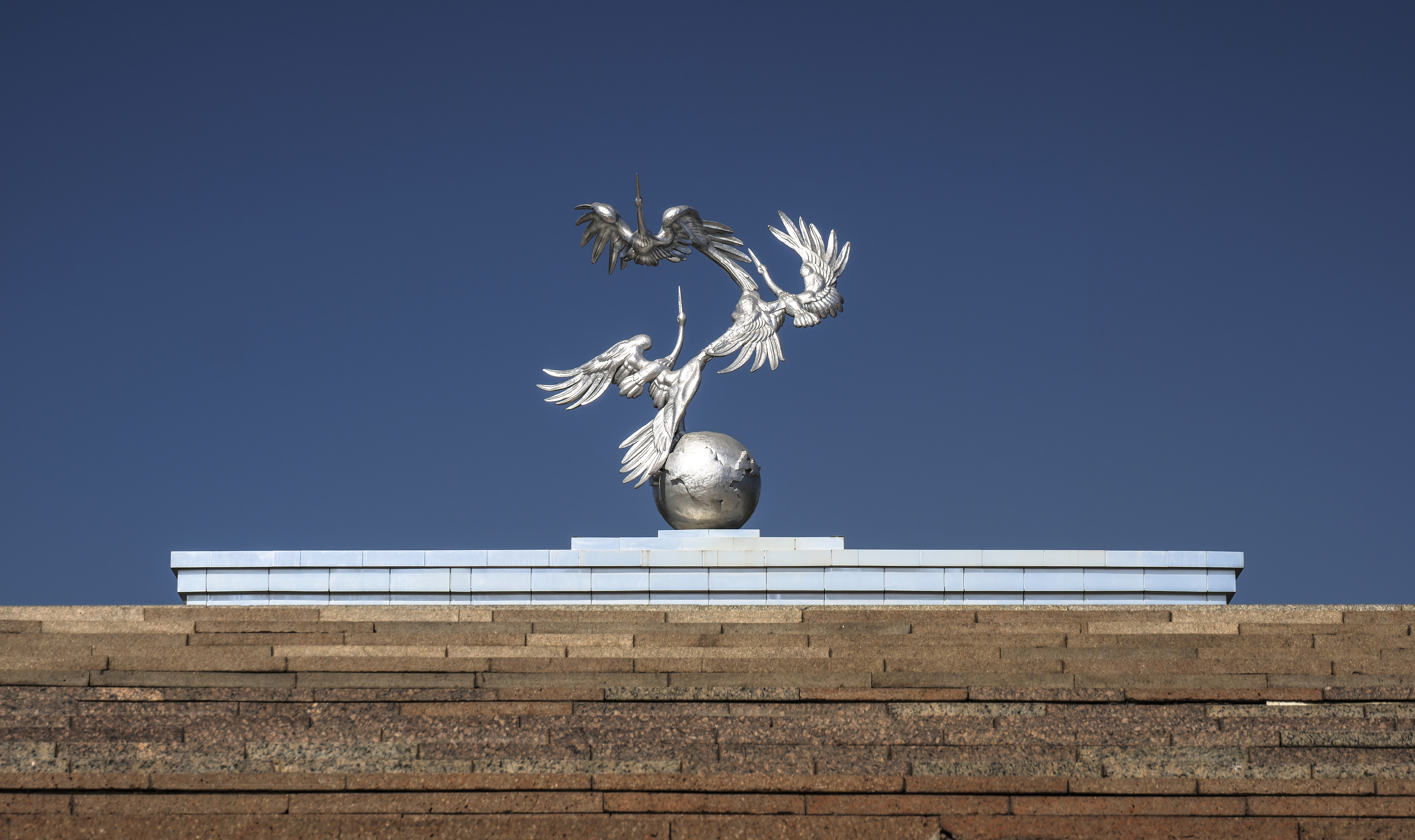

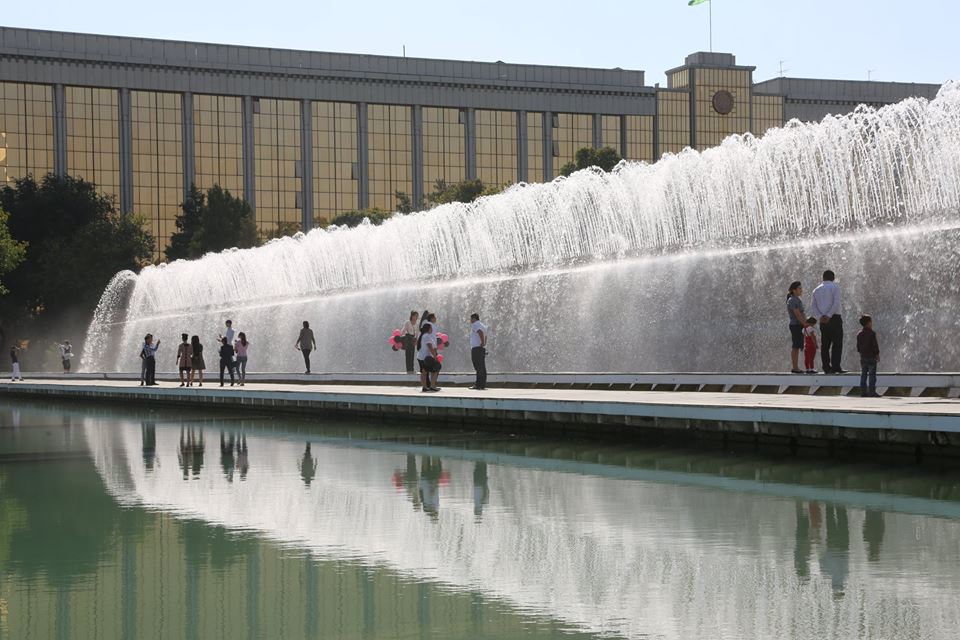

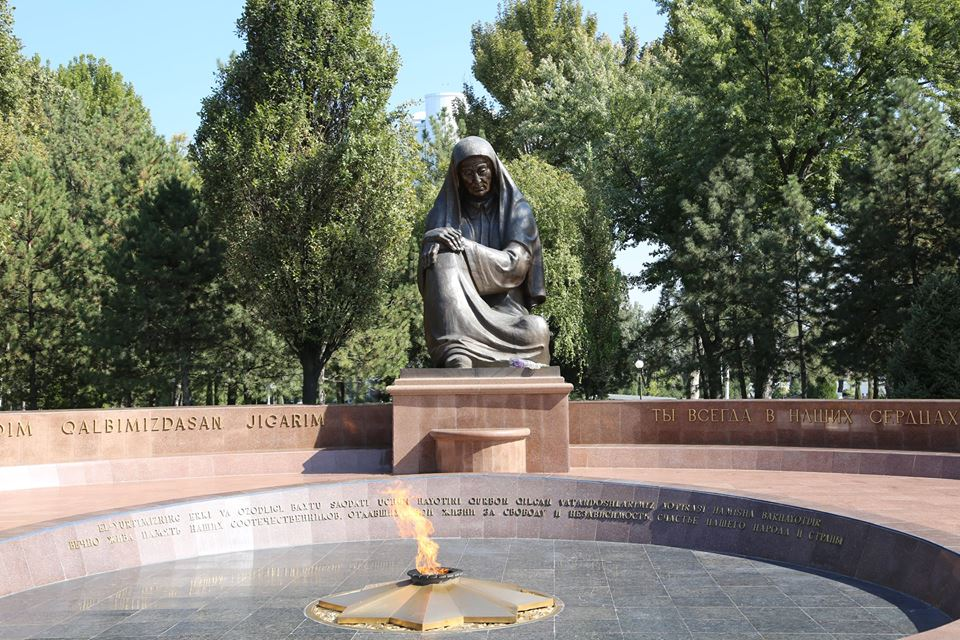

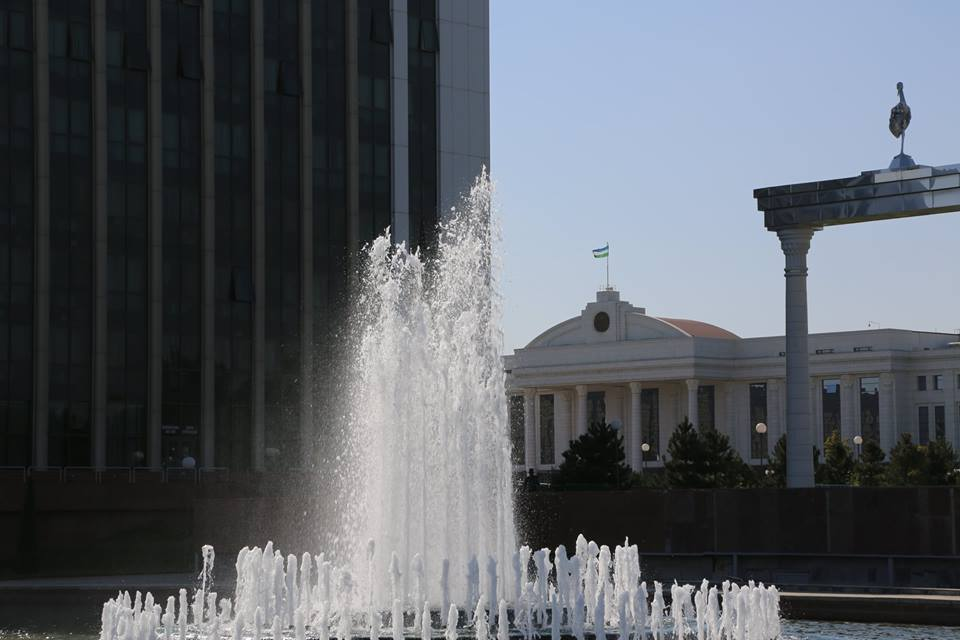
