= Ok Saroy Presidential Palace =

Coordinates: 41.3083°N 69.2599°E

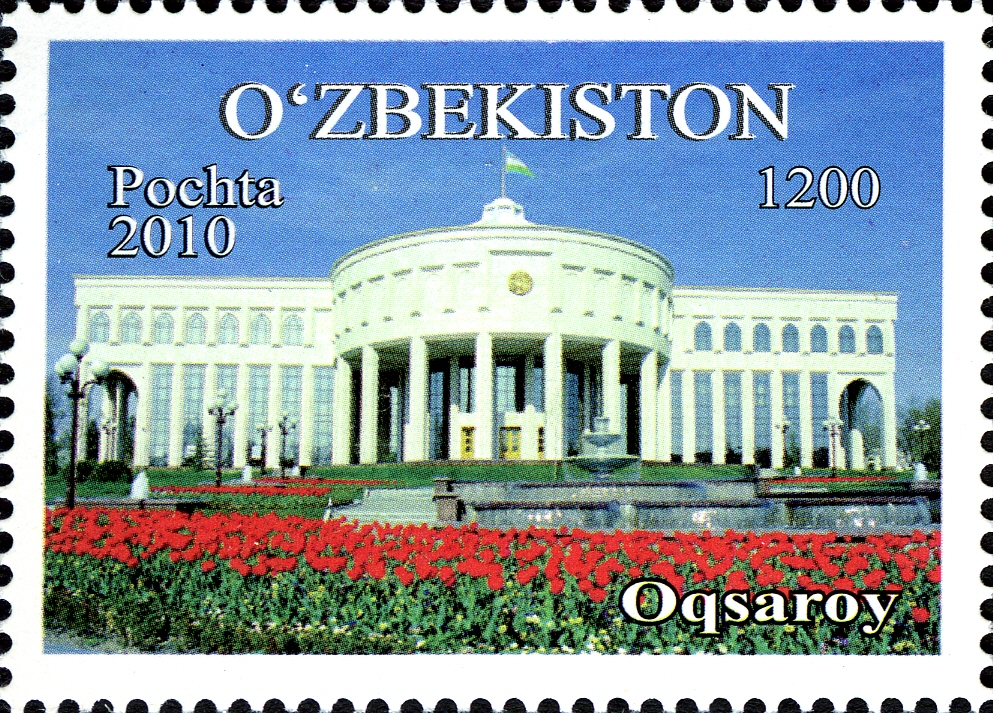
- The palace on a 2010 Uzbek stamp.
- Interactive map of the Ok Saroy Presidential Palace area

General information
- Status: Active
- Location: Tashkent, Uzbekistan
- Construction started: 1999

Design and construction
- Developer: A.Tokhtayev
- Main contractor: Energy Holding Company

Ak Saray Presidential Palace (Uzbek: Oqsaroy, Оқсарoй) meaning the White Palace in English is public museum which was the official workplace of Uzbek President Islam Karimov. Under former president Karimov, who served from 1991-2016, the palace was the seat of the executive branch in the country. After his death in 2016, the administration of Shavkat Mirziyoyev relocated the official workplace to Kuksaroy Presidential Palace in northeastern Tashkent. The area of the palace is 5460 square meters. There is a reception hall in the palace where guests will be received. There is also a meeting hall, as well as a recreational hall.

== Islam Karimov Scientific and Educational Complex ==
There is also a whole museum dedicated to Islam Karimov, where portraits and busts of Karimov are showcased. Named the Islam Karimov Scientific and Educational Complex, the complex was inaugurated on January 30, 2017, the birthday of Islam Karimov. The palace and the complex are surrounded by a large park and a small square where the Monument to the First President of Uzbekistan is located. The complex includes a large museum, a research and educational center, a library and a reading room, a conference hall.

== See also ==
- Monument to the First President of Uzbekistan
- Turkiston Palace
- Kuksaroy Presidential Palace
- President of Uzbekistan
- Romanov Palace
