= Memory and Honor Square =

War memorial

Coordinates: 41°19′5.7″N 69°16′10.1″E

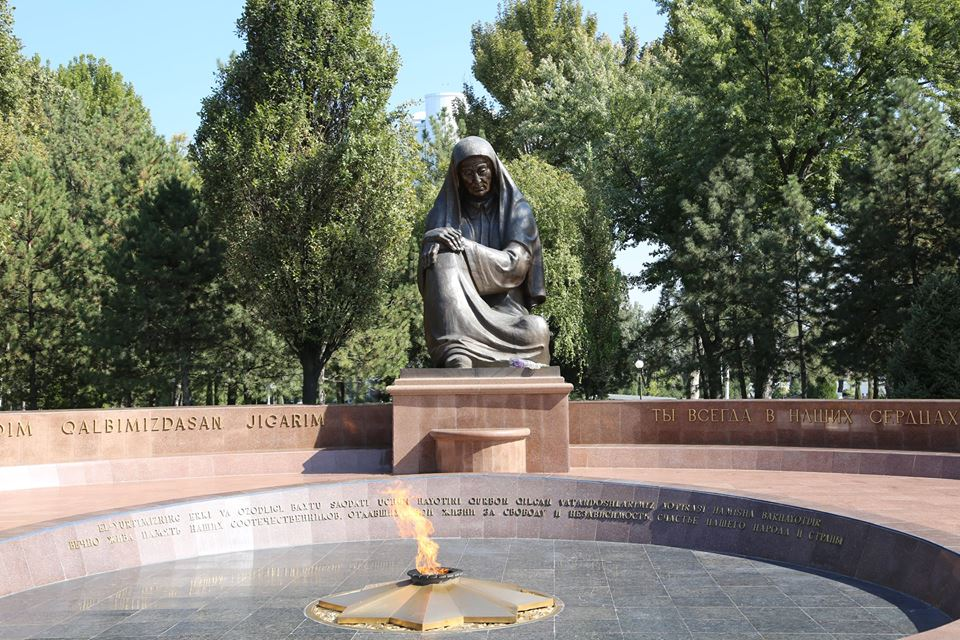
The motherland figure at the tomb

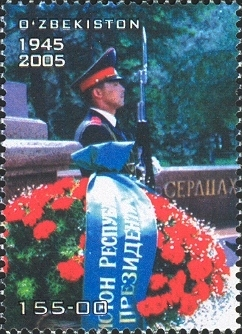
A guard of honor at the memorial.

The Memory and Honor Square (Uzbek: Xotira va qadrlash maydoni) is a war memorial complex in Tashkent dedicated to the memory of Soviet soldiers who died in the World War II. It is located on Mustaqillik Maydoni in Tashkent, the capital of Uzbekistan. The Tomb of the Unknown Soldier is located on the territory of this memorial complex.

== History ==
It contains the remains of an Uzbek soldier who died in the Battle of Moscow. The body was transferred to the authorities in the Uzbek SSR on May 7, 1975, in time for the 30th anniversary of the end of WWII. In 1999, it became part of the Square of Memory and Honour.

== Gallery ==
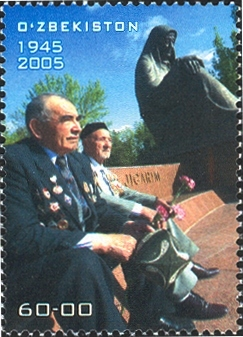

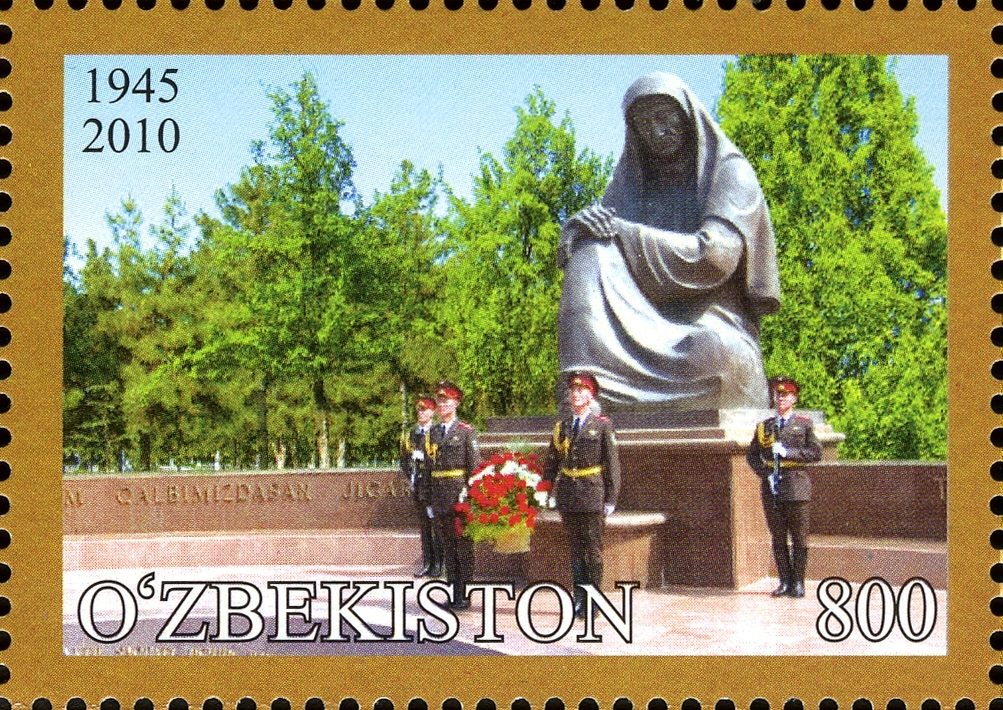

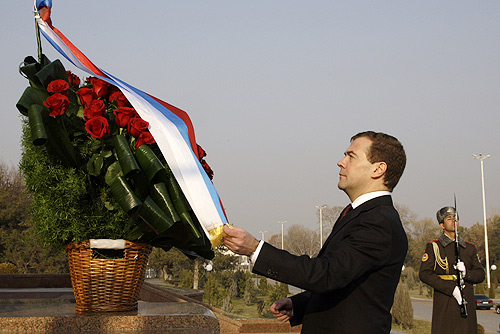

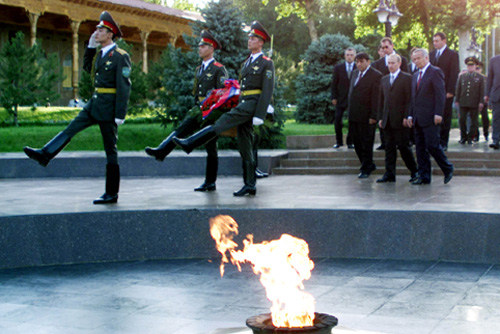

== See also ==
- Tomb of the Unknown Soldier (Moscow)
