= Mirumar Asadov =

- Born: 1927; Samarkand, USSR
- Died: 2010 (aged 82–83)
- Known for: Samarkand School of Monument Repair; Tajik State University
- Style: Ornament (art), ganch carving
- Awards: Hero of Uzbekistan; Medal "For Distinguished Labour"

Mirumar Asadov (Uzbek: Mirumar Asadov; 1927 — 2010) was a master of restoration of architectural monuments. He was awarded the title Hero of Uzbekistan in 1996.

== Biography ==
Mirumar Asadov was born on 7 September 1927, in the city of Samarkand. When World War II began, an art institute was transferred from Moscow to Samarkand. According to Mirumar Asadov's personal memories, he learnt knowledge and experience in drawing and painting from Moscow specialists, and wood carving from the famous Bukhara craftsman Shirin Murodov. In 1941 he graduated from the Samarkand School of Monument Repair.

In 1964 he graduated from Tajik State University.

In 1947, he participated in the construction of the Alisher Navoi Opera and Ballet Theater in Tashkent and the restoration of a number of monuments in Tajikistan. Mirumar Asadov took part in the renovation of Sadriddin Ayniy mausoleum and Rudaki mausoleum in Panjikent in Tajikistan.

From 1950 to 1955, he took part in the renovation of the Ulugbek madrasah in Samarkand, the Amir Temur mausoleum, the Bibi-Khanym Mosque, the Tilla-Kari madrasah, as well as the Mir Arab madrasah in Bukhara, the Bahoutdin Naqshband mausoleum, the Yunuskhan madrasah in Tashkent and the Kaldyrgochbi mausoleum.

After Uzbekistan became independent, the first important object that the master worked on was the Bahovuddin Naqshbandi mausoleum in the Bukhara region. The mausoleum, which was almost destroyed and lost its historical appearance, was repaired according to a special order of the government.

He died in 2010.

== Family ==
Together with their brothers Usta Mirusmon and Usta Mir-Said, they raised a dynasty of masters who restored historical monuments.

== Awards ==
- Medal "For Distinguished Labour" (24 April 1957)
- State Hamza Prize (1974)
- Hero of Uzbekistan (1996)

== See also ==
- Usta Shirin Murodov
