= Ulugbek Madrasah (Bukhara) =

Madrasa in Bukhara, Uzbekistan

Ulugbek madrasah
- Ulug'bek madrasasi
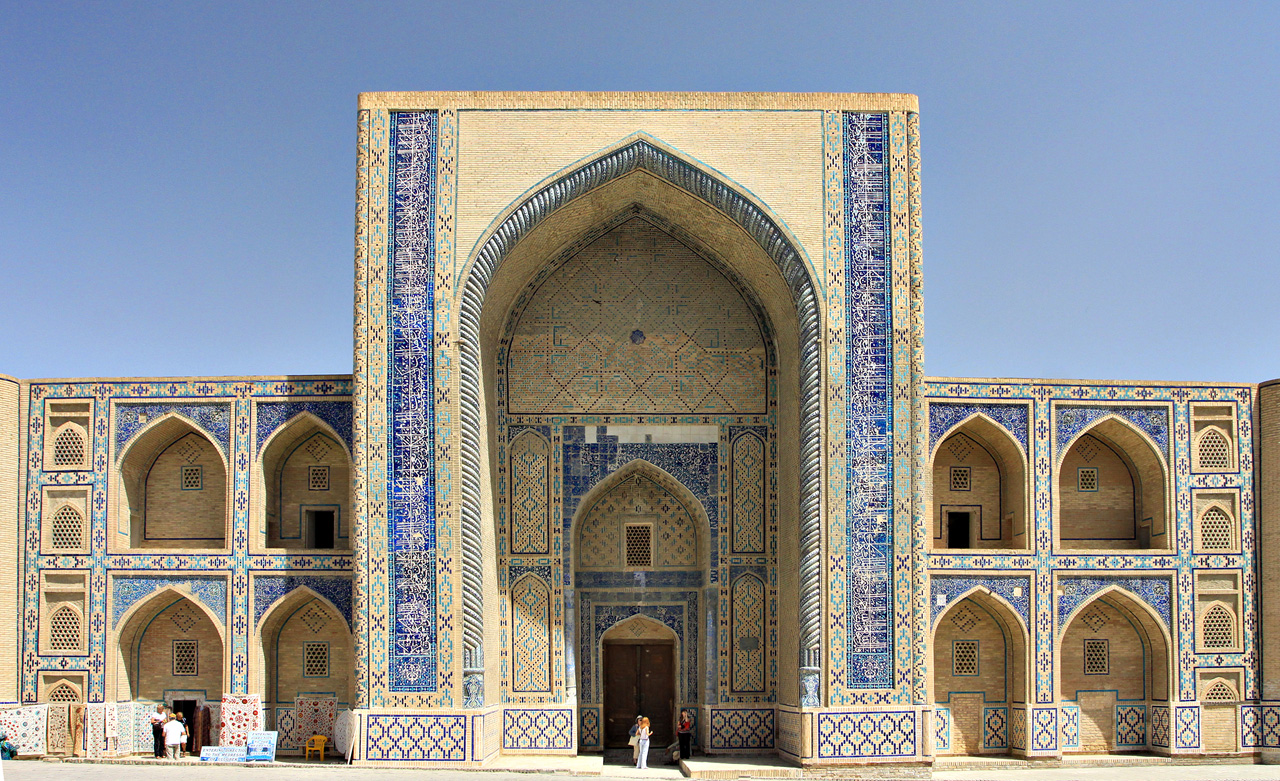
- Interactive map of the Ulugbek madrasah area

General information
- Status: under the protection of the state
- Type: Madrasah
- Architectural style: Central Asian architecture
- Location: M. Ulugʻbek MFY, Nurobod Street, Bukhara Region, Uzbekistan
- Coordinates: 39°46′36″N 64°25′03″E
- Construction started: 1417
- Construction stopped: 1417, autumn
- Owner: State property. Bukhara Region Cultural Heritage Department on the basis of operational management rights

Technical details
- Material: baked bricks

Design and construction
- Architect: Ismoil bini Tokhir Isfahoni

Ulugbek madrasah is an architectural monument (1417) in Bukhara, Uzbekistan. It is the oldest preserved madrasah in Central Asia. It is the oldest of the madrasahs built by Ulugbek. During the reign of Abdullah Khan II, major renovation works were carried out (1586).

The building is a monument of the heyday of Central Asian architecture, and madrasahs were built on its model in other cities of Central Asia. Currently, the madrasah is the only building of this size preserved in Bukhara from the Timurid dynasty. The madrasah, as well as the three madrasahs built by Ulugbek, is the oldest surviving building. It is located opposite the Abdulaziz Khan Madrasah and forms a single architectural ensemble with it. In the architecture of Central Asia, the paired ensemble of two buildings facing each other is defined by the term "double", and the term "double madrasah" refers to two madrasahs.

It was included in the UNESCO World Heritage List in 1993 as part of the "Historic Center of Bukhara". Currently the Ulugbek madrasa houses the Museum of the History of the Restoration of Bukhara Monuments.

== History ==
In the first half of the 15th century the madrasah type prevailed in the monumental construction of Central Asia. During the time of Amir Temur (1370–1405), some madrasahs trained not only educated religious personnel, but also young men from noble families who were preparing for government positions. During the reign of Ulugbek (1409–1449), madrasahs played the role of a kind of university, where, in addition to theological sciences, lectures were given on astronomy, mathematics and philosophy.

Shahrukh (1409–1447) appointed his son Ulugbek as the sultan of Movarunnahr in the capital Samarkand and the second important center – Bukhara, in the process of managing the Timurid kingdom. Mirza Ulugbek aimed to turn the cities under his control into the intellectual centers of the empire. Three madrasahs built by Ulugbek – Bukhara (1417), Samarkand(1417–1420) and Gijduvan(1433) have been preserved.

The construction of the Bukhara madrasah was completed in late 1417. But Ulugbek, who was busy with state affairs and mourned the death of his wife Ogabegim, was able to see it personally, as a patron of construction, only on 28 November 1419. He distributed gifts to students and other "deserving" people in his madrasah. During the time of Ulugbek and the following centuries, this madrasah was the center of science and cultural life in Bukhara.

The madrasah built by Ulugbek was changed over time. In 1585, during the reign of Abdullah Khan II (1583–1598), the madrasah building was renovated. In 1586, with the initiative and support of Khoja Sad (d. 23 October 1589), one of the influential Joybor sheikhs, the exterior and all the rooms were renovated. At the same time, tiles with inscriptions and patterns were used during the restoration process. Later, in the 16th and 17th centuries, the damaged parts of the building were also repaired.

N. V. Khonikov, who was in Bukhara in 1841–1842, recorded that there were 80 rooms (hujras) in the Ulugbek madrasah at that time, and his students received 3.5 gold from the endowment receipts.

According to Abdurauf Fitrat, at the beginning of the 20th century, the Ulugbek madrasa received 800 coins a year from Kuf receipts. The Ulugbek library had a separate endowment in the form of land, shops, shopping complexes, etc. This allowed the library to work materially and financially independently.

Later, the Ulugbek madrasah was renovated and underwent major changes in 1950–1970 and 1990–1996.

In 1993, the madrasah was included in the UNESCO World Heritage List, and since 1994 it has housed the Museum of the History of the Restoration of Bukhara Monuments.

== Architecture ==
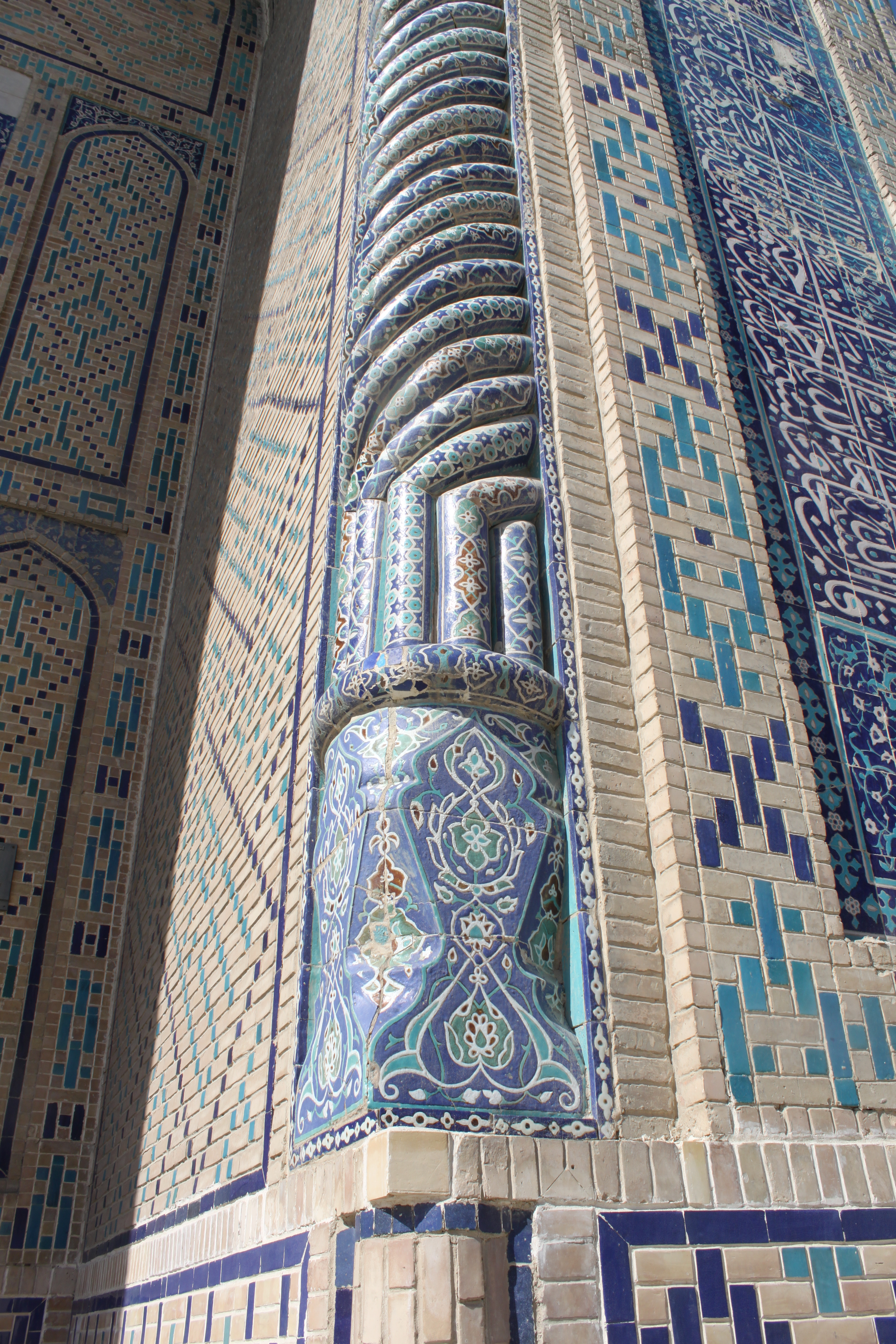
Tilework in the Ulugbek Madrasah

There is a majestic gable in the main style, two-story rooms in 2 wings and flower bouquets in the corners. The top of the bouquets is dome shaped. The main decoration of the madrasah is on the gable, which, in addition to glazed bricks, uses colorful floral rivets and tiles. From the Pishtaq arch, it turns to the yard through the mionsarai (corridor). The internal dome of the mionsarai is made of 12 sides, made of brick grid, with blue and light colored tiles placed between them.
The yard (26 × 25 m) is surrounded by a row of two-story rooms and 2 porches with a roof. The sides have a shorter appearance, and the walls, arches and gables are finished with white, turquoise and purple glazed bricks. Cells are very sensitive. The madrasah (53 × 41.6 m) is not very big, the rooms are wonderful, proportional to each other, the internal and external structure is unique.
The mosque (15.5 × 5.5 m) and the classroom (5.5 × 5.5 m) with a dome are located on both sides of the palace. There is a library on the 2nd floor of the palace. Khoja Sa'd Joybori repaired the outer stove and the adjacent rooms (1586), and decorated the Pishtaq with tiles with small inscriptions and patterns. The name of repair master Ismail ibn Tahir ibn Mahmud Isfahani is preserved among the ganch decorations on the top of the room in the west of the courtyard. According to Abdurazzoq Samarkandi, Ulugbek (on 28 November 1419) distributed gifts to the students who came to the madrasah. The Ulugbek madrasah has been changed over time. It was repaired in 16–17 centuries, 1950–70 and 1990–96. There are many star decorations in the patterns. Porch pillars are gilded. The phrase "Education is obligatory for every Muslim man and woman" is engraved on the door panels in Arabic.
