= Sitorai Mokhi-Khosa =

Palace in Bukhara, Uzbekistan

- Sitorai Mohi xossa (Uzbek)
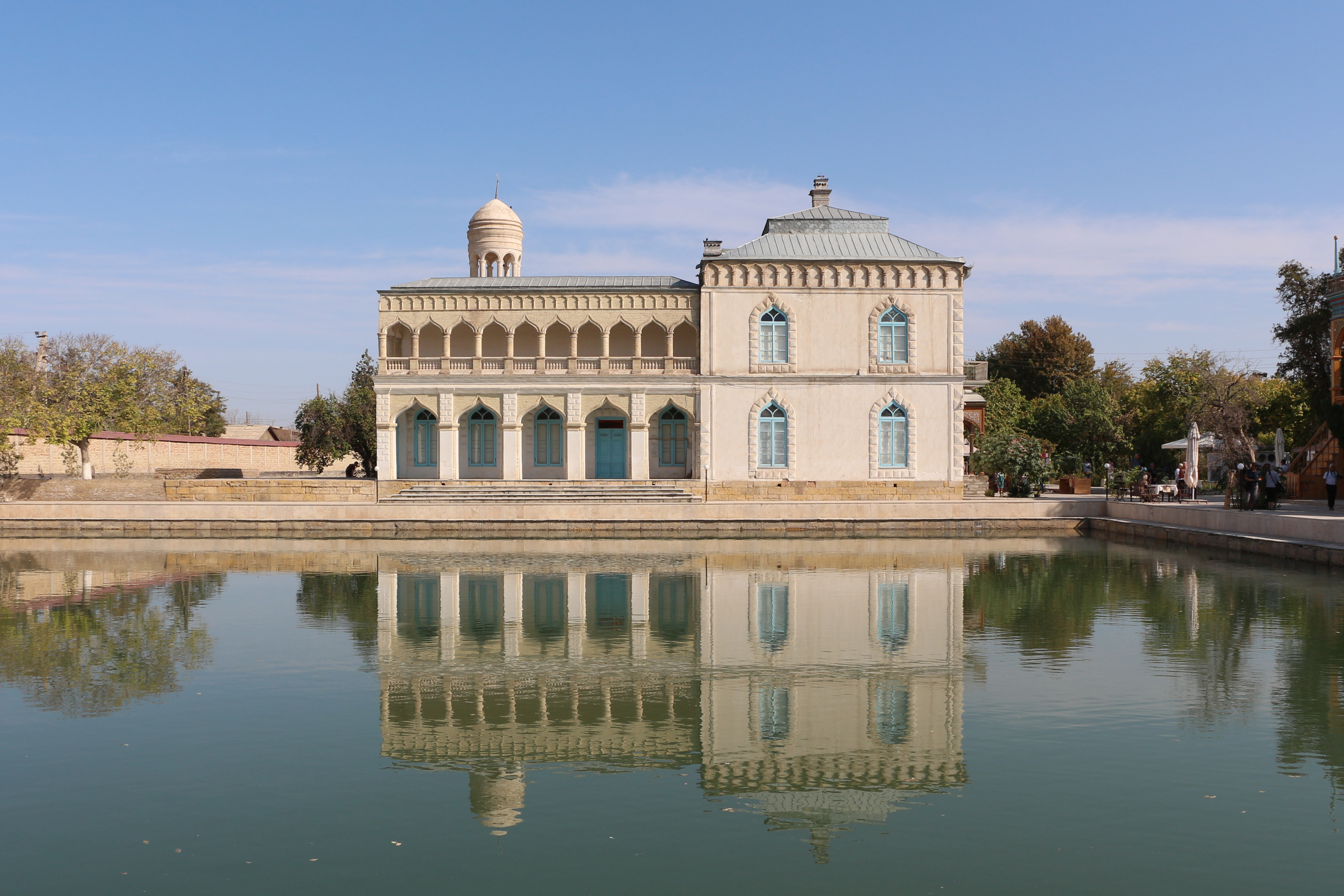
- Harem of Sitorai Mokhi-Khosa Palace
- Interactive map of Sitorai Mokhi-Khosa
- 39°48′45″N 64°26′26″E
- Location: Bukhara city
- Nearest city: Bukhara

History
- Built: 1912–1918
- Built for: Sitorai Mohi

Site notes
- Visitors: 158 thousand

Sitorai Mokhi-Khosa (uzbek: Sitorai Mohi xossa) also known as the "Palace Like the Stars and the Moon," is a country residence of the Emir of Bukhara, built in the late 19th to early 20th century. Currently, it houses a museum of decorative and applied arts.

== History ==
The Sitorai Mohi Khosa Palace is divided into the old and the new. The initial constructions of the palace (which have not survived to this day) date back to the 18th century, and then, during the reign of Emir Said Abd al-Ahad Khan in the second half of the 19th century, further buildings were added. The new complex was built in a European style but is divided into a male and a female section, with an Eastern interior design. It was constructed during the rule of the last Emir of Bukhara, Sayyid Mir Muhammad Alim Khan (1912–1920). The construction of the palace involved famous master craftsmen of their time, such as Hasanjon Umarov, Abdullo Gafurov, Rahim Khaitov, Ibrahim Khafizov, Karim Samadov, Usto Zhura, Usto Khodjakul, and Usta Shirin Murodov, as well as two Russian engineers, Margulis and Sakovich, who served at the emir's court. Currently, the palace houses a museum of decorative and applied arts.

== History of the museum ==
The museum was opened in 1927 and consisted of three sections: "The Lives of the Last Emirs," "Urban Craftsmanship," and "The History of the Bukhara Revolution". The first Uzbek museum curator, Musadjan Saidjanov (1893–1937; arrested as an "enemy of the people" and executed), played an active role in the creation of the museum. In 1933, the Sitorai Mohi Khosa became a branch of the Bukhara Museum and was given the status of an interdistrict local history museum. The exhibition was rearranged and expanded. The display continued until 1947.

Starting from 1948, the exhibition was named "Folk Art and Culture of Bukhara" and included sections on "Monumental Art of Bukhara," "Applied Arts," "Folk Music and Creativity," "Calligraphy and Miniature Art," and "Cultural Ties of Bukhara with Neighboring Fraternal States". In 1954, the palace became the departmental rest house for the Central Committee of the Communist Party of Uzbekistan (ACCTU), and the museum was reduced to nine main halls from the entire palace complex. The exhibition was renamed the "Museum of Folk Art."

== Currently ==
Currently, the palace complex houses the Museum of Decorative and Applied Arts, and the following exhibitions are on display:

- "Interior of the Summer Palace" (Main Building): This section features palace furniture from the 19th and 20th centuries, Chinese and Japanese porcelain from the 14th to the 20th centuries, palace art objects from Russia, jewelry created by renowned Bukhara craftsmen, and gold-embroidered panels and saddlecloths.
- "Clothing of a Bukharan Townsman from the Late 19th to Early 20th Century" (Octagonal Pavilion): This collection showcases palace gold-embroidered clothing, belts, scarves, and footwear.
- "Artistic Embroidery from the Bukhara Region and Household Utensils from the Late 19th to Early 20th Century": The collection includes decorative “suzani", prayer rugs known as "joymoses," pillow covers called "takiyapush," and embroidered curtains referred to as "chimilik". Ethnographic Exhibition of Urban House Interiors in Bukhara: This exhibit portrays the interior of urban homes in Bukhara.
- In the palace garden, scientific and restoration work has been carried out, and the fortress wall, pavilions, and the ancient flora and fauna have been restored.

== Literature ==
- Guidebook "Sitorai Mohi Hossa". – Bukhara, 1999. Zhumaev Koregdi
- Abdukhalikov F., Kamilova H., Rakhimova Z., Muminova U., Rakhmatullaeva U. Traditional Uzbek costume based on materials from museum and private collections of Uzbekistan. Part 1. 2021 Tashkent ISBN 978-9943-7500-1-2
- Abdukhalikov F., Kamilova H., Rakhimova Z., Muminova U., Rakhmatullaeva U. Traditional Uzbek costume based on materials from museum and private collections of Uzbekistan. Part 2. 2021 Tashkent ISBN 978-9943-7500-6-7
