= Abdulaziz Khan Madrasah =

Ancient madrasa in Bukhara, Uzbekistan

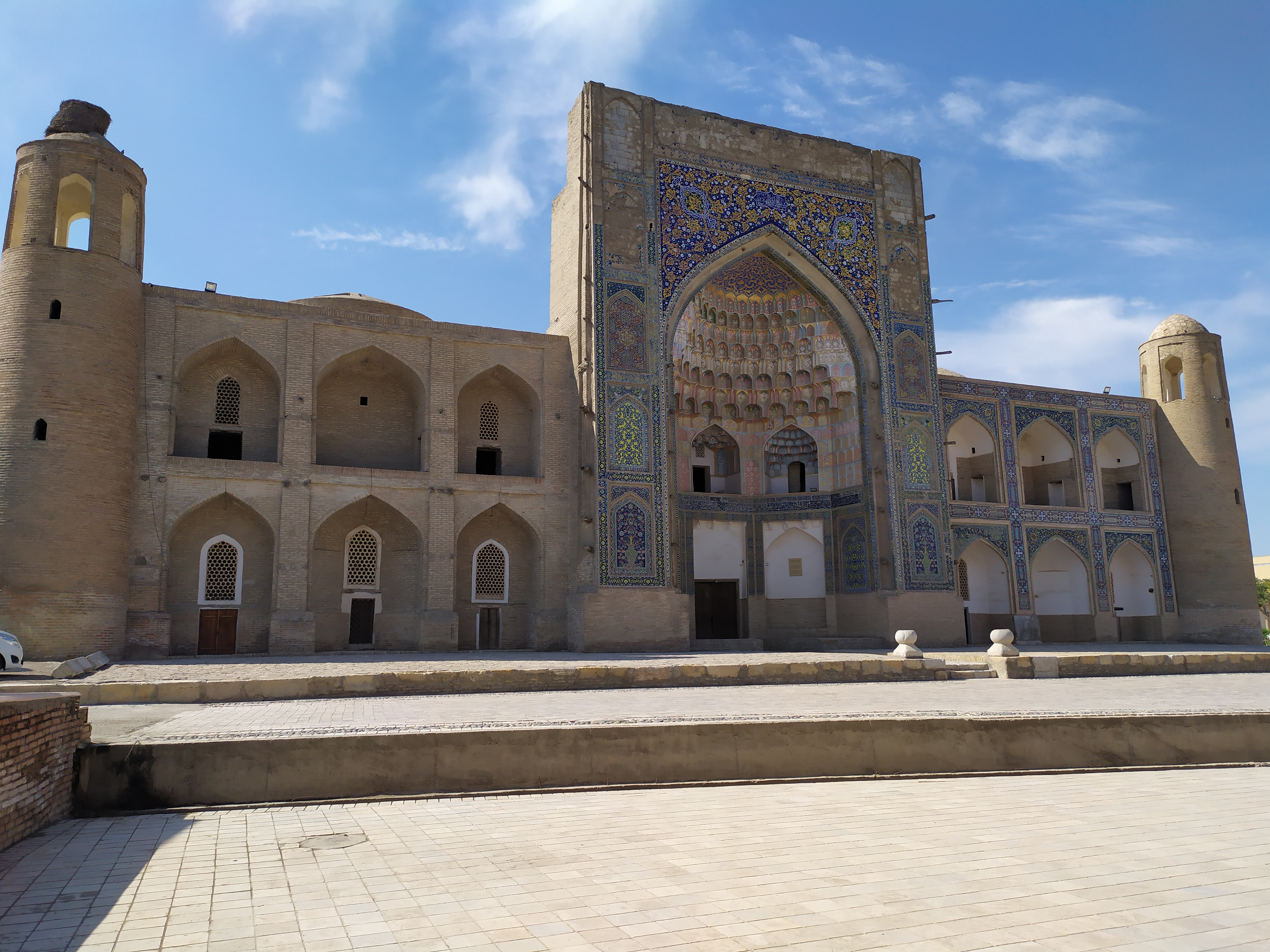
- Interactive map of the Abdulaziz Khan Madrasah area

General information
- Type: madrasa
- Location: Bukhara, Uzbekistan
- Coordinates: 39.7760°N 64.4177°E
- Groundbreaking: 1652
- Completed: 1654

Design and construction
- Developer: Abd al-Aziz Khan

The Abdulaziz-Khan Madrasah is an ancient madrasa in Bukhara, Uzbekistan. Like the entire historic part of the city, it is listed as a UNESCO world heritage site. It owes its name to its founder, Abdulaziz Khan (1614-1683) who had it built in 1652-1654. It is part of an architectural ensemble, forming a koch (double) with the Ulugbek Madrasah (1417), located to the east of the jewelers' bazaar. Its exterior decoration is partly unfinished, because the Khan was dethroned while the decoration of the madrasa was not yet finished and the architect put an end to the project.

== Description ==
The external portal, or Pishtaq, as well as the portals opening onto the interior courtyard are covered with blue and yellow tiles (this bright yellow being used for the first time in Bukhara) where we find traditional motifs, such as the vase of happiness.

The madrasah is decorated with mosaics, relief majolica, glazed tiles, chiseled marble, alabaster frescoes, gantch (chiseled wood) and gold leaf. It is therefore a masterpiece of the Central Asian architectural art. One can notice, contrary to the Islamic architectural tradition, figurative representations and greater realism of floral and plant decoration. In addition to the cells and shared areas, the madrasa includes a small winter mosque and a summer mosque.
The madrasah also has fireplaces, which was an innovation for the time.

Today, the Abdullaziz-Khan Madrasah houses souvenir, fabric and carpet shops.

== Illustrations ==
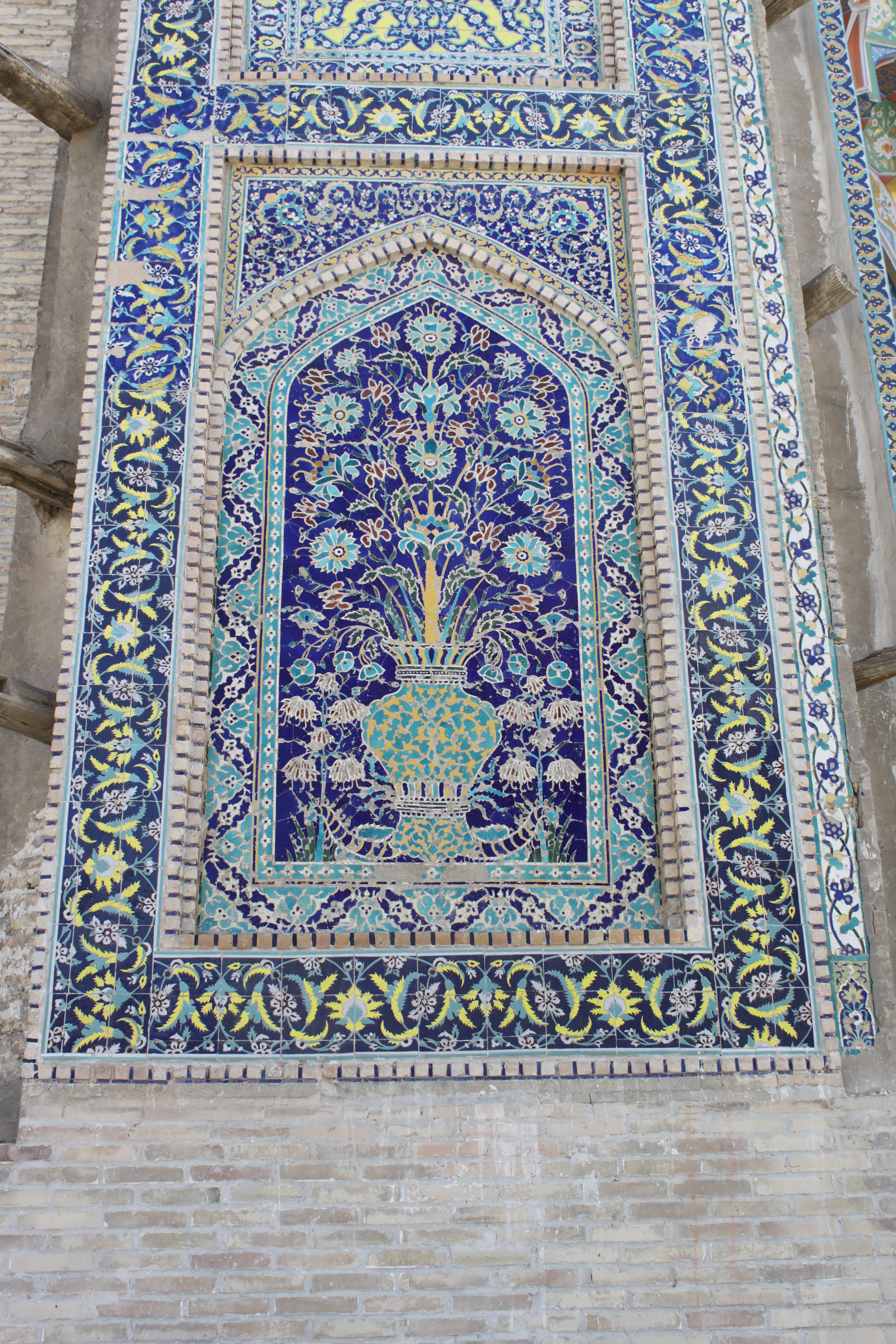
Detail of the vase of happiness on the left side of the pishtaq.

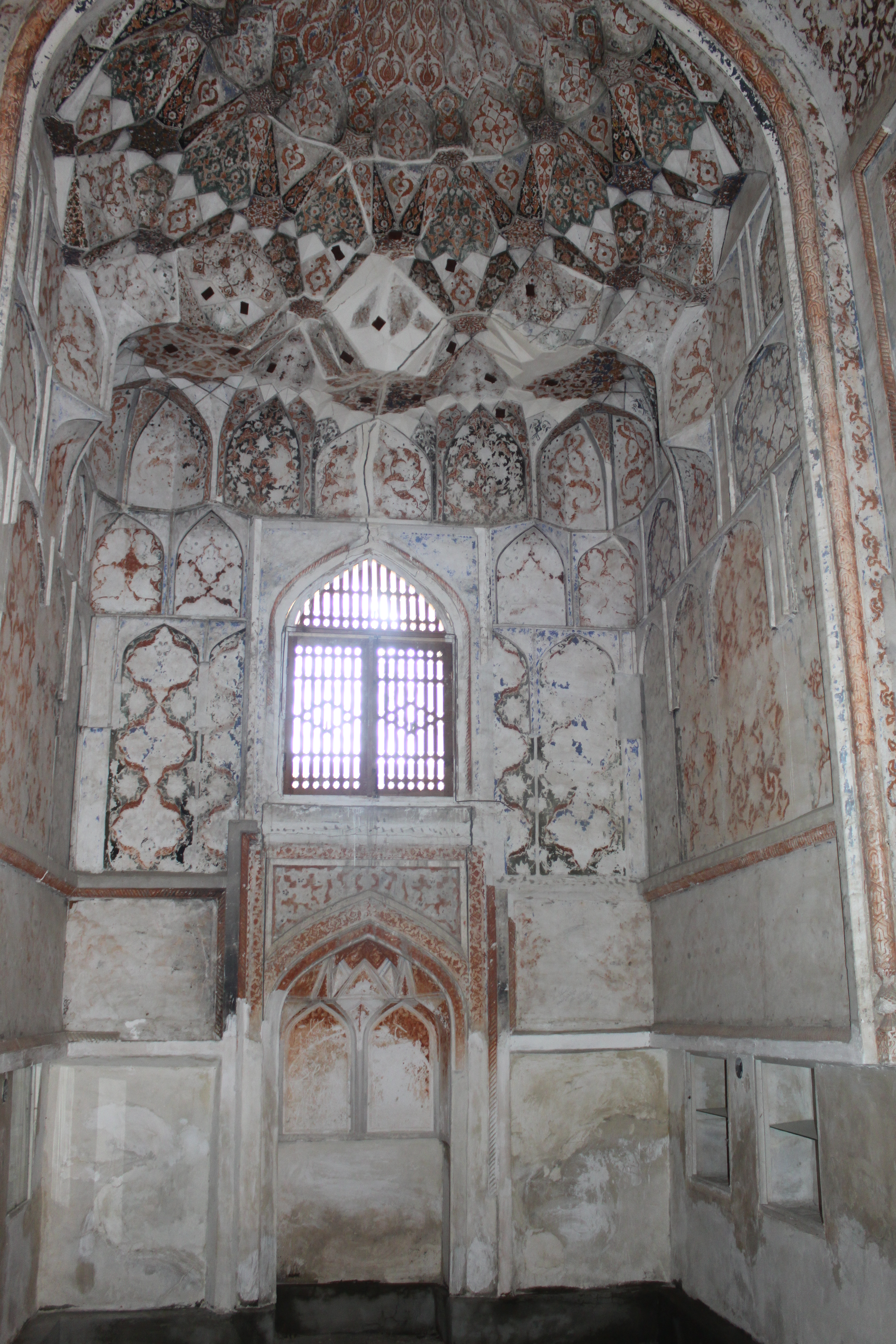
Mihrab in the winter mosque

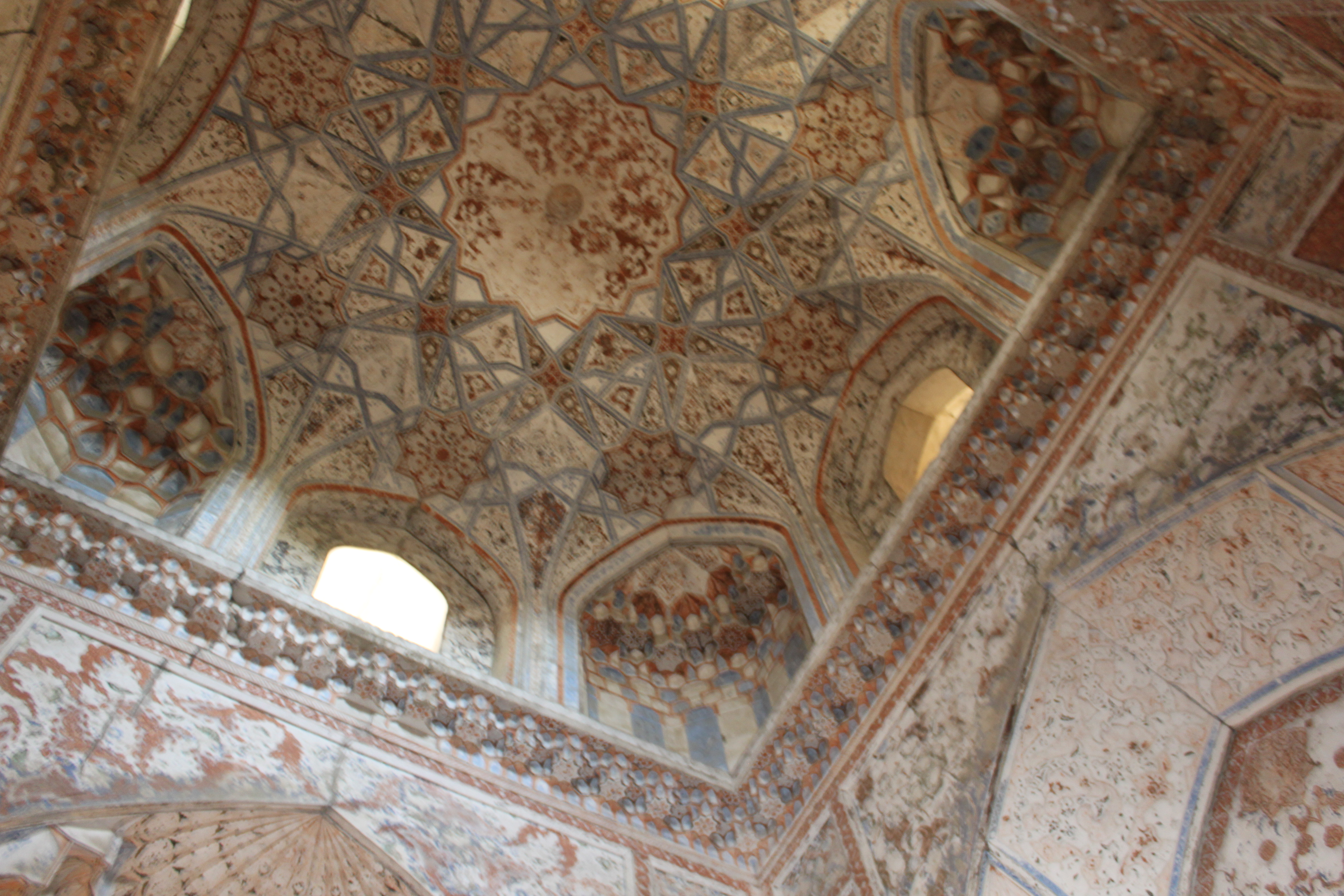
Detail of the ceiling of the winter mosque

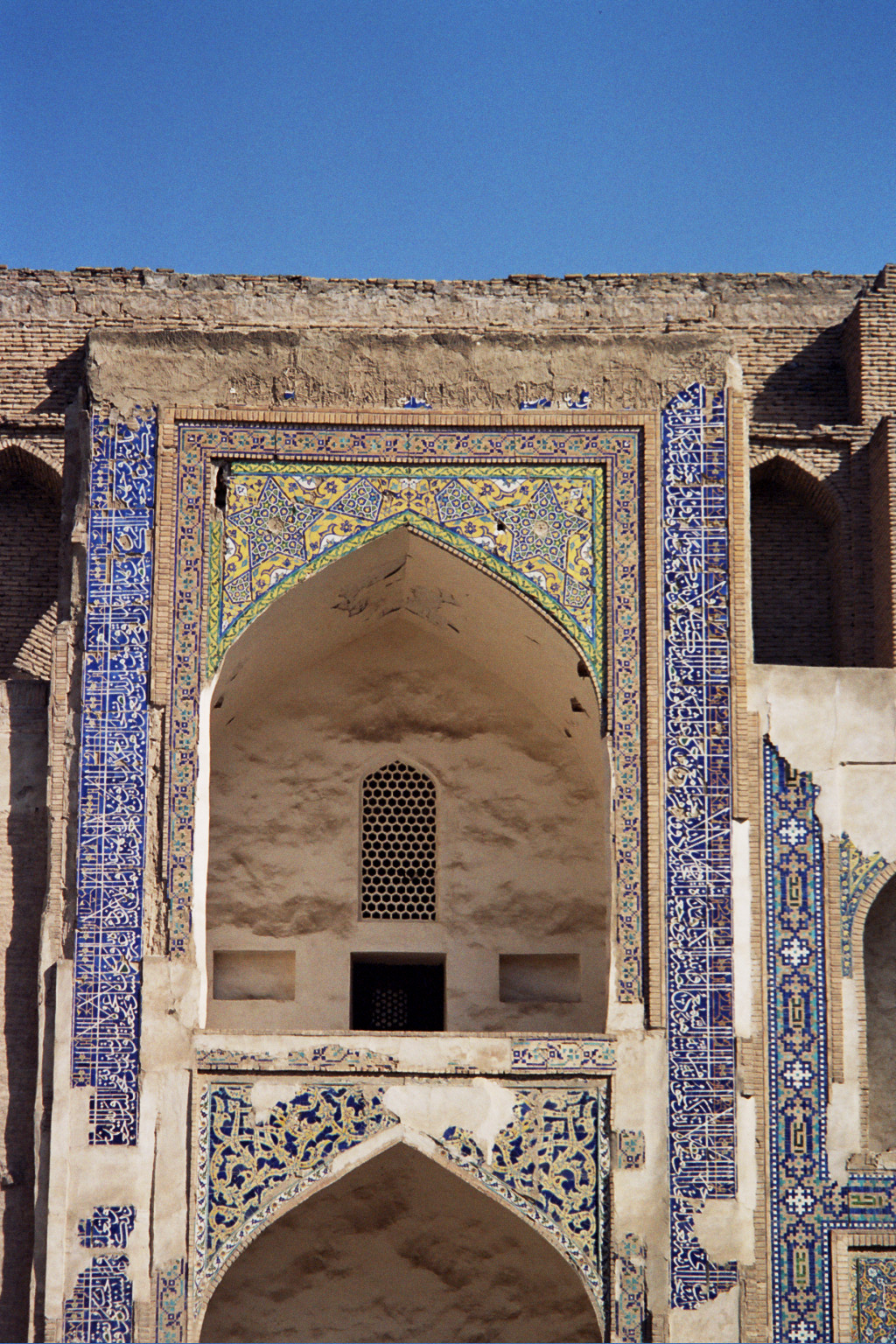
View of the loggia of one of the cells

== Sources ==
- Ouzbékistan, guide Le Petit Futé, édition 2012
- Asie centrale, guide Le Petit futé, édition 2008
- Galina Pougatchenkova and Lazare Rempel, Essays on the art of Central Asia [Очерки искусства Средней Азии], First edition, Moscow, Iskousstvo, 1980, 287 pages (in Russian)
- K.Karimova and T. Alimov, Bukhara. City and legends [Бухара. Город и легенды], First edition, Tachkent, "DAVR NASHRIYOTI", 2010, 30 pages (in Russian)
- Sadriddine Aïni, Boukhara, Paris, éd. NRF Gallimard, 1956
- Bradley Mayhew, Mark Elliott, Tom Masters and John Noble, Central Asia, Lonely Planet, 2014, p. 203, ISBN 978-88-5920-473-2.
