= 1991 Uzbek independence election =

- 29 December 1991
- Do you approve of the state independence of the Republic of Uzbekistan proclaimed by the Supreme Council of the Republic of Uzbekistan?

Results
Choice	Votes	%
Yes	9,718,155	98.26%
No	172,294	1.74%
Valid votes	9,890,449	99.92%
Invalid or blank votes	8,258	0.08%
Total votes	9,898,707	100.00%
Registered voters/turnout	10,515,066	94.14%

An independence referendum was held in the Republic of Uzbekistan on 29 December 1991, alongside presidential elections and three days after the breakup of the USSR that Uzbekistan had previously declared independence from. The result was 98% of voters in favour, with a turnout of 94%.

== Background ==
In a USSR-wide referendum held in March, 95% of voters in the Uzbek Soviet Socialist Republic voted in favour of preserving the Soviet Union as "a renewed federation of equal sovereign republics in which the rights and freedom of an individual of any nationality will be fully guaranteed?" There was also a separate question asked only in the Uzbek SSR, with 95% of voters voting in favour of the proposal that the country "should remain part of a renewed Union (federation) as a sovereign republic with equal rights".

However, following the failure of the attempted coup d'état in August, which Uzbek leadership had endorsed, it was decided to seek independence. Independence was subsequently declared on 31 August, and the Soviet Union ceased to exist on 26 December 1991, three days before the referendum. Uzbekistan was the only republic to hold an independence referendum after the disintegration of the Union, albeit after already having declared independence while it still existed.

== Results ==
Choice	Votes	%
For	9,718,155	98.26
Against	172,294	1.74
Total	9,890,449	100.00
Valid votes	9,890,449	99.92
Invalid/blank votes	8,258	0.08
Total votes	9,898,707	100.00
Registered voters/turnout	10,515,066	94.14
Source: Nohlen et al.
