= Romanov Palace =

Building in Tashkent, Uzbekistan

- Дворец Николая Константиновича (Russian); Дворец Романовых (Russian)
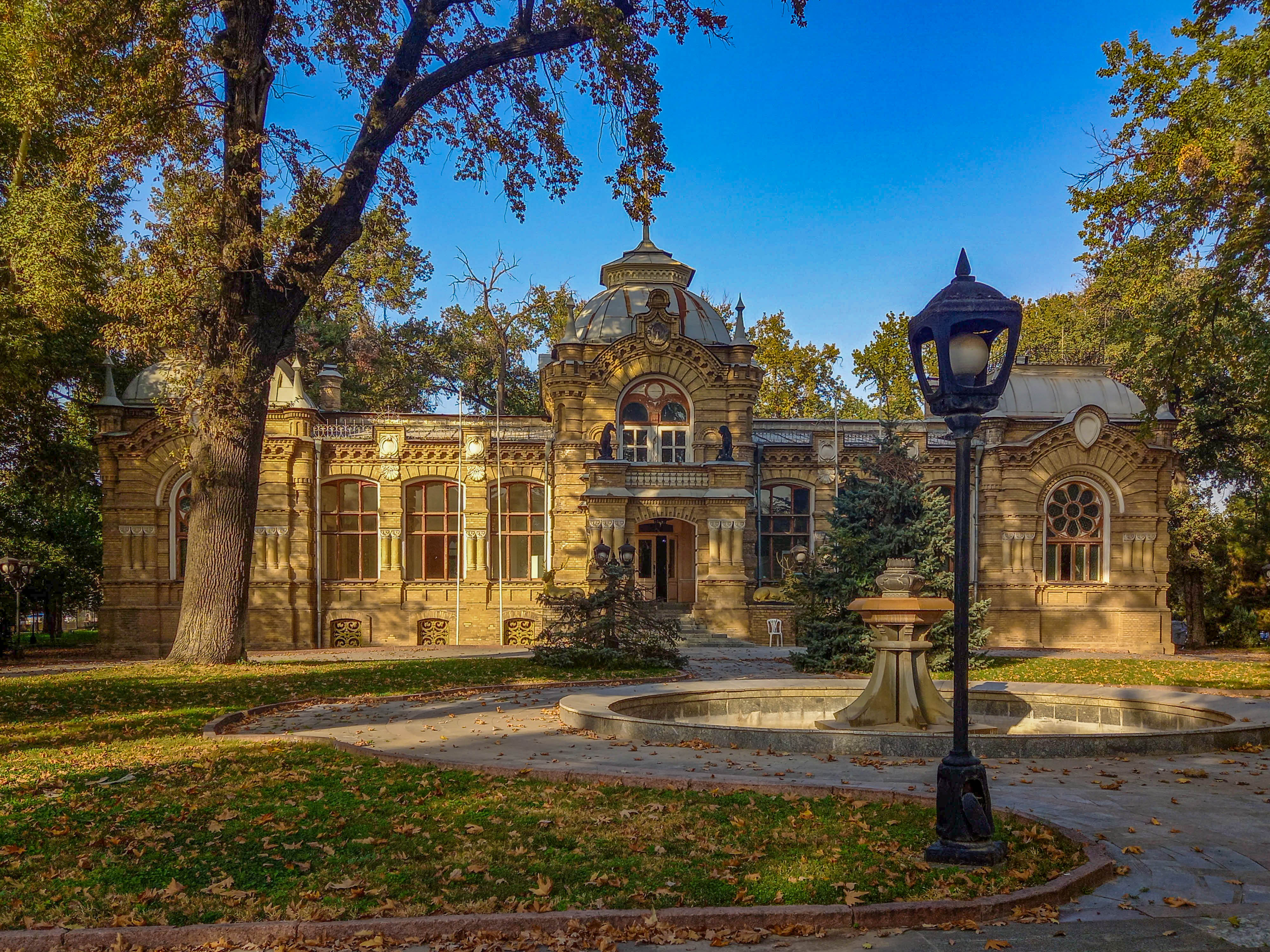
- Interactive map of Romanov Palace
- 41°18′51.5″N 69°16′14.2″E
- Location: Sayilgoh street, Yunusabad; Tashkent, Uzbekistan

History
- Built: 1891
- Built for: Prince Romanov
- Original use: Palace

Site notes
- Architect(s): Aleksey Benua, Vilgelm Geynselman
- Current use: Ministry of Foreign Affairs of the Republic of Uzbekistan

The Romanov Palace, located in Tashkent, Uzbekistan, was built in 1891 according to the design of architect V.S Geintselman and A.L. Benois for Grand Duke Nikolai Konstantinovich, who had been exiled to the outskirts of the empire in the Turkestan region. The left wing of the palace housed the apartments of the Grand Duke, and the right-wing housed the apartments of his wife. Currently, the building is used as a reception house for the Ministry of Foreign Affairs of Uzbekistan. Near the entrance to the palace grounds, there used to be the Iosifo-Georgievskaya Church until 1995.

== Interior and surroundings ==
In 1907, a metal fence was installed around the palace grounds, and it was transformed into a residence, comprising living quarters and a servants' house. The palace featured a garden and was adorned with decorative stables. The Romanov Palace had a P-shaped design with two main sections and a front porch (portico). The central part of the building had a two-story room with a dome and four corner turrets adorned with ornate minarets. The lower part of the palace housed a spacious storage area and service rooms. On the first floor, there was the grand living quarters of the prince and a reception room. Guests would enter the reception room through a vestibule at the entrance. A spiral staircase led from the vestibule to a significantly larger room on the second floor, which was further connected to a smaller room. On either side of the smaller room, there were decorative alcoves with arches. The rooms on either side of the vestibule were interconnected.

The room with the dome on the western side was designed in an Eastern style, while the room on the eastern side featured a European-style design. The main arches on the front facade were constructed in a Gothic style. Throughout the years, the palace served various purposes, including hosting the Museum of Turkistan People's University initially, followed by the Republic Central Fine Arts Museum (1924), the Republic Palace of Pioneers (1934-1980), and the Museum of Uzbek Jewelry Art (1980-1993).

Entering through the oak carved double-leaf wide doors at the front of the palace, the visitor entered a large circular hall in dark wood with an intricately shaped lantern lowered on a cast-iron chain. There were three doors leading out of the hall: directly in front of the person entering, and to the right and left. Behind the left door was a circular spiral patterned iron staircase leading to the first floor, a rich, large library and billiard room. Entering the right door, the visitor entered the spacious winter garden. There were palm trees of different varieties, as well as lemon, orange, tangerine and Pomeranian trees.

On the left side of the entrance to the winter garden there was a Japanese garden with dwarf fruit trees; in this garden there were babbling brooks, over which there were beautiful bridges with railings in the form of fences and tunnels, as well as tiny houses and near them a mass of figures of people and animals in picturesque poses. Also, in the garden there were arbors of tropical plants in bloom.

Passing through the left door from the hall, the visitor entered three halls, one after the other. These halls contained marble statues and paintings from the collection of Nikolai Konstantinovich. This collection of paintings and sculptures is now in the Art Museum of Uzbekistan.

A door opposite the entrance led from the hall to other rooms of varying sizes. In the first small living room, a charming statue of Venus stood close to a huge French window, which looked pink and transparent when illuminated by the sunlight falling through the window. In the next room in glass cabinets and showcases were numerous exhibits from Nikolai Konstantinovich's collection - figurines, ivory toys, orders, medals, rings, bracelets, silver and gold jewelry and many other interesting things of this kind.

== Repairing ==
One of the stained-glass halls in the western part of the palace, with walls and ceilings painted from floor to floor, has preserved its original appearance. The adjacent hall, decorated with white ganch, was restored in 1978-1980 - a window appeared under the carving. This technology was invented by the decorative artist, and ganch engraver Usta Shirin Murodov and was used in the decoration of the Sitorai Mokhi-Khosa. Masters from Namangan, Bukhara, Samarkand, and Tashkent took part in decorating the eastern hall. Since 1993, it has been repaired and adapted for reception ceremonies of the Ministry of Foreign Affairs of the Republic of Uzbekistan. Among them is the decision of the Cabinet of Ministers No. 1019 of December 19, 2019, according to which the Fund for the Development of Culture and Art was entrusted with the reconstruction of the former residence of Prince Romanov in Tashkent and the restoration of the original architectural appearance of the building.

== The fate of the building in Soviet times ==
During the Soviet era, a museum was established in the palace because Grand Duke Nikolai Konstantinovich had bequeathed the palace to the city of Tashkent before he died in 1918, with the condition that a museum be created in the palace. The Grand Duke himself died in January 1918 from a brief lung inflammation.

The collection of European and Russian paintings, gathered by the Grand Duke and brought from St. Petersburg, served as the foundation for the establishment of the Art Museum in Tashkent in 1919, which possessed one of the richest collections of European paintings among art museums in Central Asia.

Later, from the 1940s to the 1970s, due to the relocation of the Art Museum to a new building, the Republican Palace of Pioneers and a museum of antiques and jewelry art of Uzbekistan (until the early 1990s) were housed in the palace.
