= Monument to the First President of Uzbekistan =

Monument in Ok Saroy Presidential Palace in Uzbekistan

Coordinates: 41°18′28.5″N 69°15′33.4″E

- O'zbekistonning birinchi prezidenti haykali Ўзбекистоннинг биринчи президенти ҳайкали Памятник Первой Президенту Узбекистан
- Interactive map of Monument to the First President of Uzbekistan
- Location: near Ok Saroy Presidential Palace, Tashkent, Uzbekistan
- Material: bronze
- Beginning date: 2017
- Completion date: 2017
- Opening date: 30 August 2017; 8 years ago
- Dedicated to: Former President of Uzbekistan Islam Karimov

The Monument to the First President of Uzbekistan is a monument in the Ok Saroy Presidential Palace in the city of Tashkent, the capital of Uzbekistan. A monument dedicated to First President Islam Karimov, it was opened by President Shavkat Mirziyoyev, and family members of Karimov on August 31, 2017.
