= Campus of Babson College =

Occupies 370 acres in Wellesley, Massachusetts

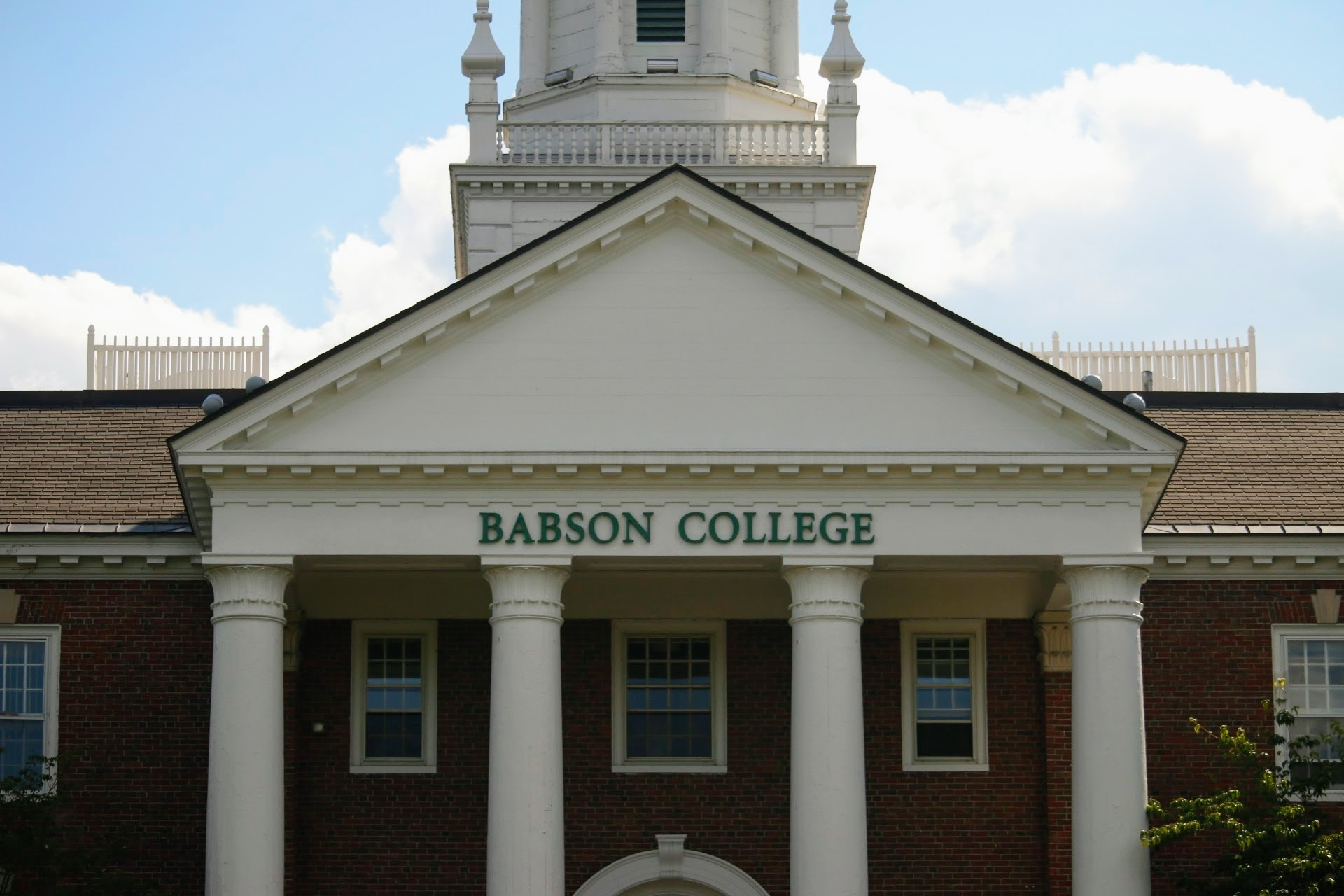
- Established: 1919
- Location: Babson Park, Wellesley, Massachusetts, United States
- Campus: 370 acres; Suburban

Babson College occupies 370 acres in Wellesley, Massachusetts, 14 miles west of downtown Boston. The oldest buildings at Babson date back to 1904, fifteen years prior to the institution's founding. Notable architects include George F. Marlowe Jr., Kilham & Thompkins, and Henry Forbes Bigelow. The suburban campus is situated within an architecturally-rich landscape with many Richardsonian Romanesque buildings nearby. The campus is served by Wellesley Farms Station, designed by H.H. Richardson prior to his passing in 1886.

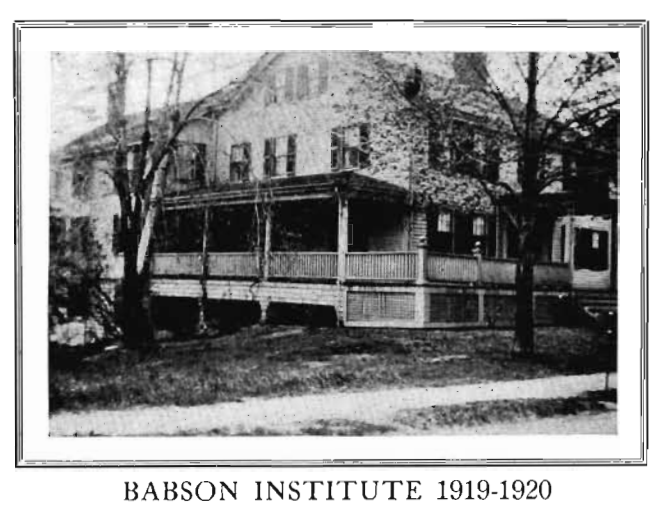
Babson's first location in the Babson family home on Abbott Road

== Pre-campus (1919-1921) ==
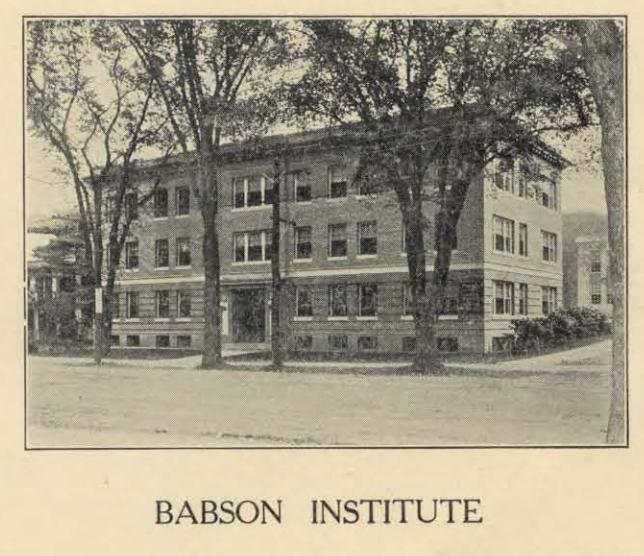
In its second year, the institute moved to the former Babson Reports building near Wellesley Farms station.

The Babson Institute began in Roger and Grace Babson's former home on Abbott Road before moving to a building on Washington Street in its second year. In early 1922, the Institute purchased a 200-acre farm, where campus construction began that fall. The new campus became the permanent home of Babson Institute starting in the 1923–24 academic year.

== Marlowe era (1922-1930) ==
Architect George F. Marlowe Jr. shaped the early architectural identity of Babson College (then the Babson Institute) during its formative years in the 1920s. His association with Roger Babson likely began through Eliza Newkirk Rogers, a Wellesley College architect with whom Marlowe collaborated on Horton House. Roger Babson admired the Georgian design of Wellesley College's Horton House and chose Marlowe to bring that style to the new campus.

Marlowe joined the Babson Institute as a salaried architect in January 1922 and quickly produced a unified campus plan in the Georgian Revival style. By 1923, several key buildings were completed: the Administration Building (now Mustard Hall), Knight Auditorium, Bryant Hall and its twin the Lyon Building (now Lukšić Hall). Subsequent projects included the Babson Park Clubhouse (now Park Manor South), Peavey Hall Gymnasium, the Bank Building (now Publishers Hall), Coleman Hall (originally housing the Great Relief Map), and Westgate Hall, which served as both presidential residence and infirmary. After designing ten buildings for Babson and upon the completion of Park Manor Central in 1930, Marlowe resigned from the Babson Institute to lead his own firm.

Upon the recommendation of architect Benjamin Proctor, Babson chose to build the institute's early buildings using inexpensive “cul” bricks. These bricks, though once considered inferior, proved durable and became a visual staple of these early buildings.

Babson also hired John Nolen, prominent landscape designer and urban planner, to design the campus layout, however it was never implemented.

Early architecture of Babson College
Three of the first four Babson buildings: Knight Auditorium, Mustard Hall (Lunder Admissions Center), and Bryant Hall

Lukšić Hall (formerly Lyon Building) housed the offices and the library before 1939.

Park Manor South (built 1925) originally operated as a hotel for wealthy students and visiting business people.

1924 Campus Plan by John Nolen

== Great depression and World War II ==
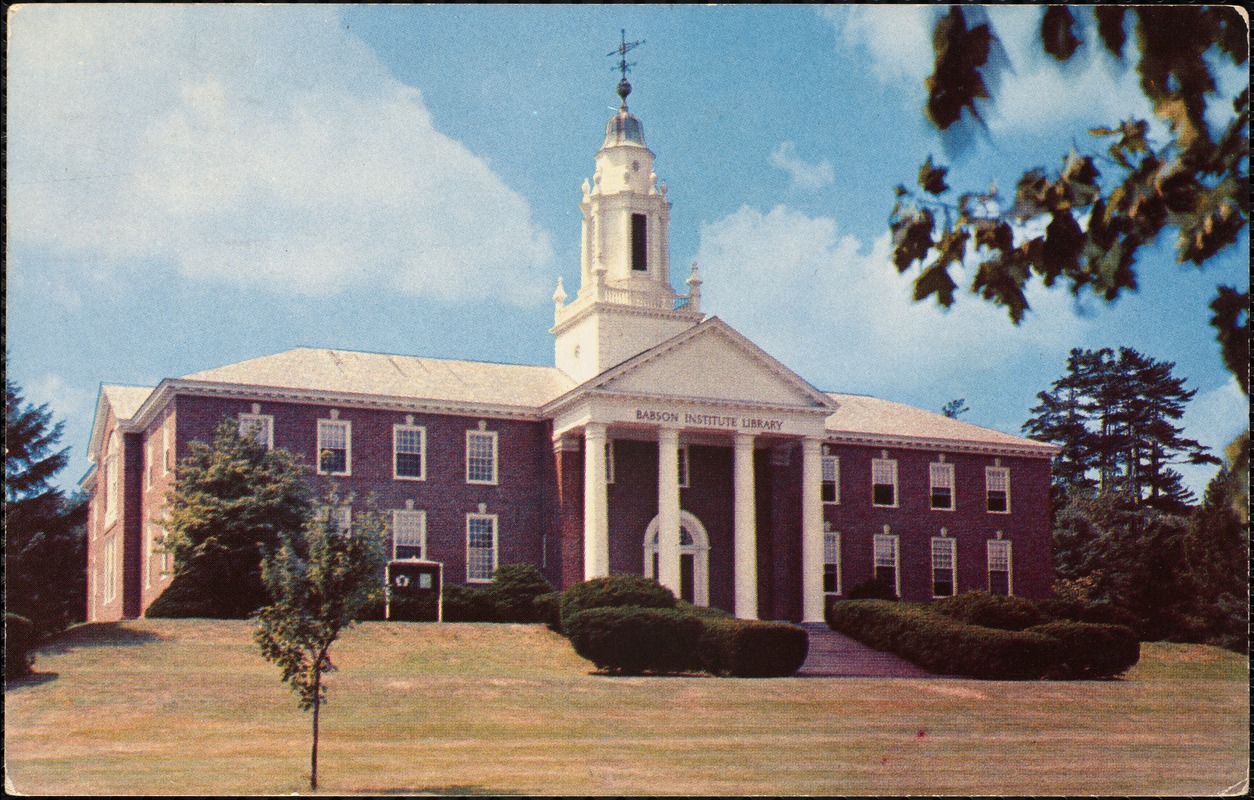
The Babson Institute Library before it was renamed Tomasso Hall

Although Roger Babson is credited with predicting the Wall Street Crash of 1929, the Babson Institute was hit hard by the great depression. Enrollment dropped as low as 46 students and campus development slowed. Toward the end of the decade, however, the campus’ flagship building was dedicated.

The building now known as Tomasso Hall was originally constructed in 1938–1939 as Babson’s library, designed by architects Henry and Richmond at a cost of $182,850. Planning began in 1936 under a library committee led by Babson’s second president Carl Smith.

The building initially housed the president’s office and featured the parlour from Sir Isaac Newton’s St. Martins Street house. In 1947, William C. Hotchin donated a bell for the library tower, and in 1955 the library was renamed the Sir Isaac Newton Library.

By the 1960s, the facility had become too small, leading to the construction of the Horn Library in 1980. The original building was later renovated and renamed Tomasso Hall in 1981.

== Postwar development ==
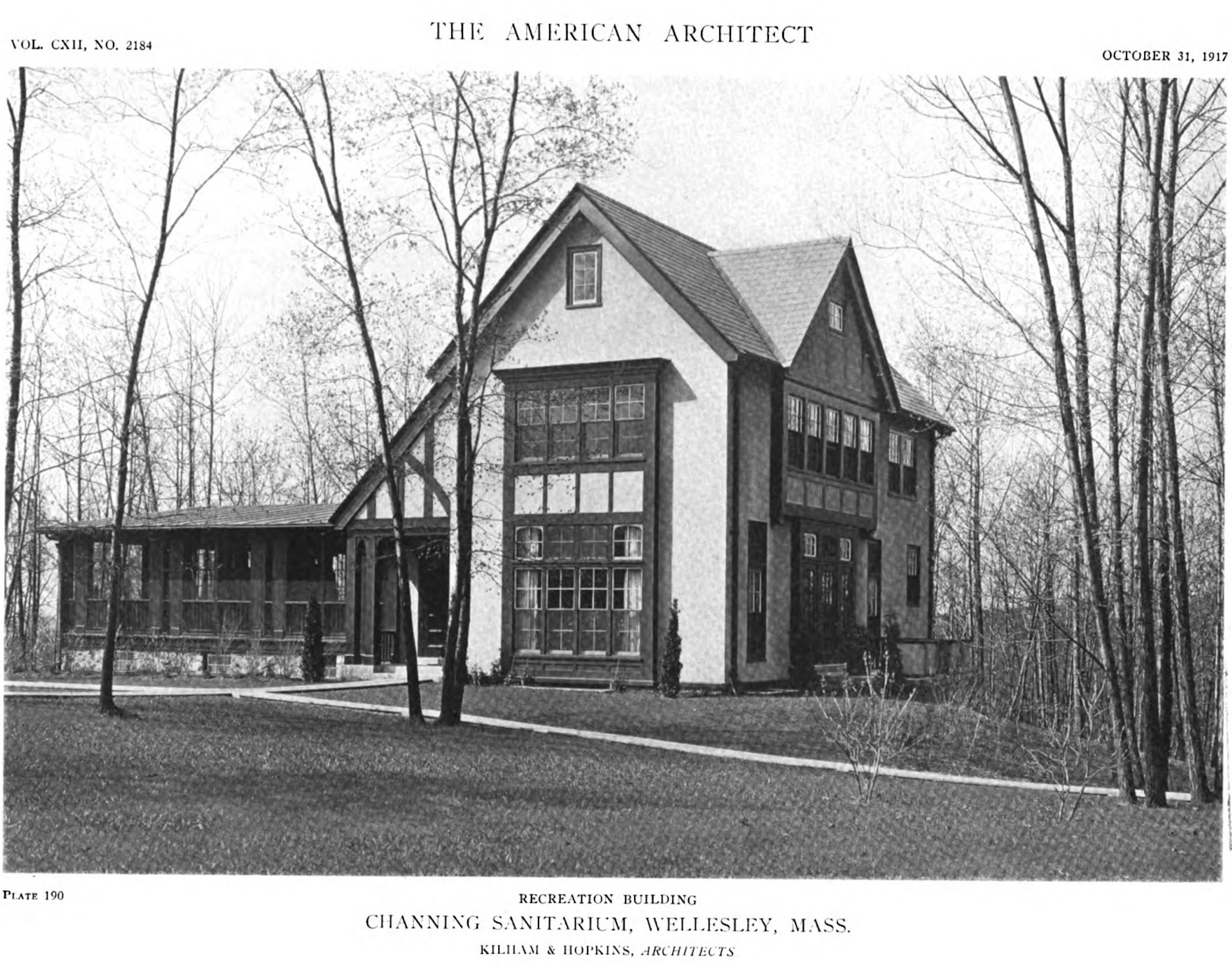
The seven buildings of Woodland Hills were designed by the nationally renowned architectural firm of Kilham & Hopkins.

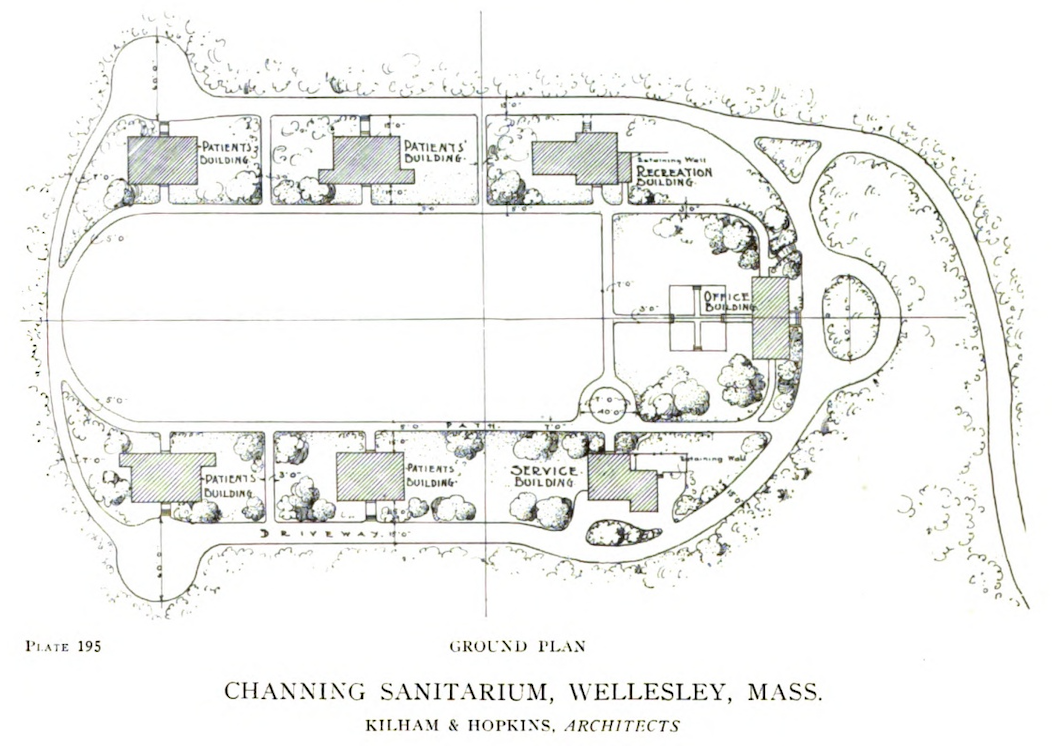
Woodland Hills previously housed a well-known countryside sanitorium.

=== Acquisition of Channing Sanitarium and Forest Hall ===
In 1952, Roger Babson acquired the neighboring Channing Sanitarium. In its heyday, the Channing Sanitorium had been home to main well-known ailing Bostonians including Elise Hall, the first woman in the United States to play the saxophone. While Babson initially considered retaining the facility, he later repurposed the buildings for faculty and student housing as Babson Institute expanded. The sanitarium complex included seven buildings, all designed by the noted Boston firm Kilham & Hopkins. The former sanitarium grounds are now known as Woodland Hill on Babson's campus.

Later that decade, Babson acquired Forest Hall. Originally serving as a children's convalescent home, the 12.5-acre property was purchased in March 1959 for $140,000. The building, which was built in 1904 and serves as the oldest on campus, was renovated for use as residences and classrooms for the 1960–1961 academic year.

== Brutalist era (1970-1990) ==
see also Brutalism on college campuses

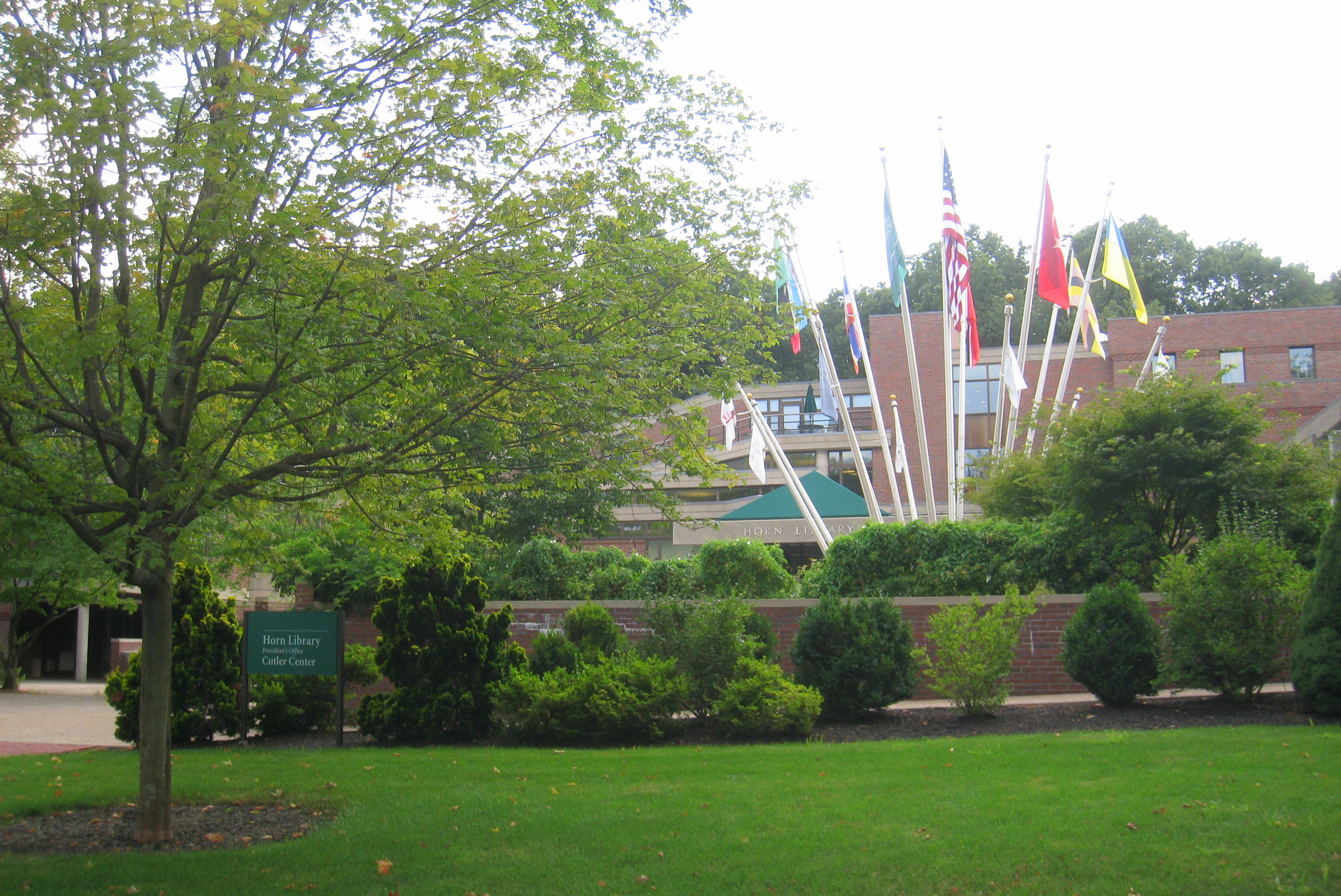
Horn Library before its renovation in 2019

In preparation for the institute's 50th anniversary and in the wake of the Supreme Court's Title IX decision, Babson prepared a Master Plan in 1968 that called for several sweeping institutional changes, including the admission of women, the introduction of liberal arts courses, and a major campus expansion. The following year, the Babson Institute became Babson College and entered a period of substantial growth.

Like many colleges and universities in the 1970s, Babson embraced Brutalism. Buildings such as Horn Library used raw concrete surfaces, dark brick facades, and strong geometric forms that contrasted sharply with Marlowe's Georgian Revival buildings of the campus's early decades.

The period's architectural centerpiece was Horn Library, completed in 1980 with a $4.3 million grant from the Olin Foundation, then the largest single gift in the college's history. Not only did Horn Library provide study space, but the sprawling complex also shifted the campus's architectural center of gravity. Historically, Babson Park Avenue functioned as a main entrance, particularly for businesses located near the post office. The road was closed to through traffic in 1973 following the construction of College Drive, which was designed to improve access to the newly built Educational Center complex (including Kriebel Hall, Gerber Hall, Horn Library, and Babson Hall). Babson Park Avenue was formally removed as a street in 1980, and its former route now exists as Park Manor Way connecting the Park Manor Quad, Millea Hall, and the campus post office. With the elimination of several older roads, Babson created a pedestrian-oriented campus that prioritized walking, cycling, and open green space.

Among the major projects of the day were the transformation of the Newton Library into Tomasso Hall (1981), the expansion of Forest Hall, and two new Woodland Hill apartment buildings. Mustard Hall was renovated to house the Undergraduate Admissions Office, while Nichols Hall was converted into a multipurpose administrative building.

== Modern development ==
In the 1990s, Babson returned to red brick architecture with modern architectural elements. Newer developments include:

- Van Winkle Hall (1993)
- F. W. Olin Graduate School of Business building (1998)
- Glavin Chapel (1997)
- Arthur M. Blank Center for Entrepreneurial Studies (1998)
- Sorenson Visual Arts Center (2002)
- Mandell Family Hall (2006)
- Park Manor West (2015)
- Babson Commons (2019)
- Weisman Foundry (2019)

Olin College

In 1997, the F. W. Olin Foundation announced the establishment of Olin College with what was at the time the largest gift to an institute of higher education in the United States. Babson sold Olin a 70-acre parcel along the Needham-Wellesley town line to build its new campus. Olin included a formal relationship with Babson College in its original institutional plan. Buildings designed by Perry Dean Rogers were constructed as close to Babson as possible, with walkways and open spaces intended to create physical and social connections between the two institutions.

== Campus features ==
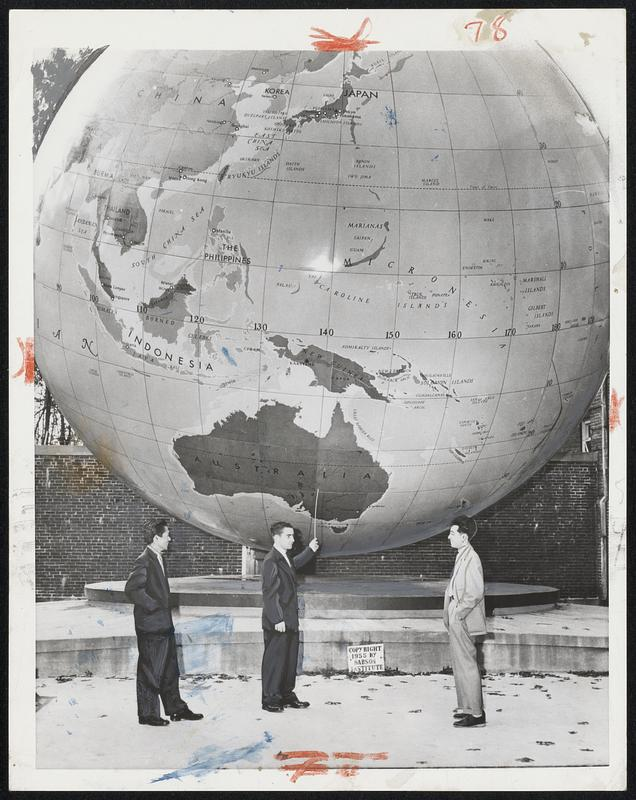
Babson Globe in 1957

Babson Globe

The Babson Globe is a 28-foot-diameter steel globe featuring a hand-painted porcelain-enamel map of the world at a scale of 24 miles to the inch. Completed at a cost of approximately $200,000, the 25-ton structure rests on a 6-ton hollow shaft set at a 23.5° tilt to represent Earth’s axis and can rotate at variable speeds. Sylvia Plath attended the globe's dedication ceremony on June 18, 1955. The globe’s rotation is powered by a one-horsepower motor beneath the ground. From 1955 to 1988, it was the largest rotating globe in the world and held a Guinness World Record. In addition to using the globe to teach geography, Roger Babson hoped its rotation could one day lead to discoveries about gravity and the development of new, limitless sources of power (see Gravity Research Foundation). It was designed by George C. Izenour of New Haven, Connecticut and fabricated by Bethlehem Steel Company, Chicago Bridge and Iron Company, and The Bettinger Corporation of Waltham, Massachusetts. Until 2018, the globe was located next to Coleman Map Hall (and the former Great Relief Map). In 2019, the globe was repainted and moved closer to the main campus entrance. It remains the second-largest rotating globe in the United States.

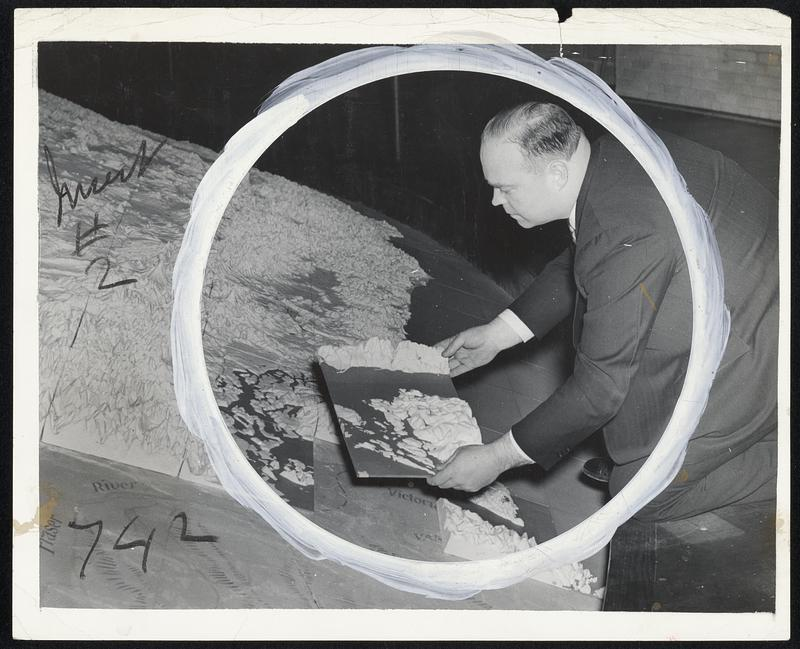
Dr. Wallace W. Atwood, a member of the National Map Committee, finishing the Great Relief Map

Great Relief Map

In 1923, Roger Babson proposed creating a topographically accurate relief model of the United States. With support from former U.S. Secretary of War Newton D. Baker, Babson established the National Map Committee, composed of educators and industrial leaders from across the country, to oversee and guide the project’s development.

The Great Relief Map, completed on December 31, 1940, was the world’s largest relief map of the United States. Measuring 65 by 45 feet and covering 3,000 square feet, the map’s horizontal scale was one inch to four miles, while vertical relief was exaggerated to highlight topography. Constructed over fifteen years from 1,216 individually fitted blocks, the map provided a comprehensive view of the nation’s natural features and transportation routes. Each block represents one degree of latitude by one degree of longitude. The map became popular among local teachers who used it for field trips. During World War II, it became a resource for aviators and weather stations. The map was removed in 1998.

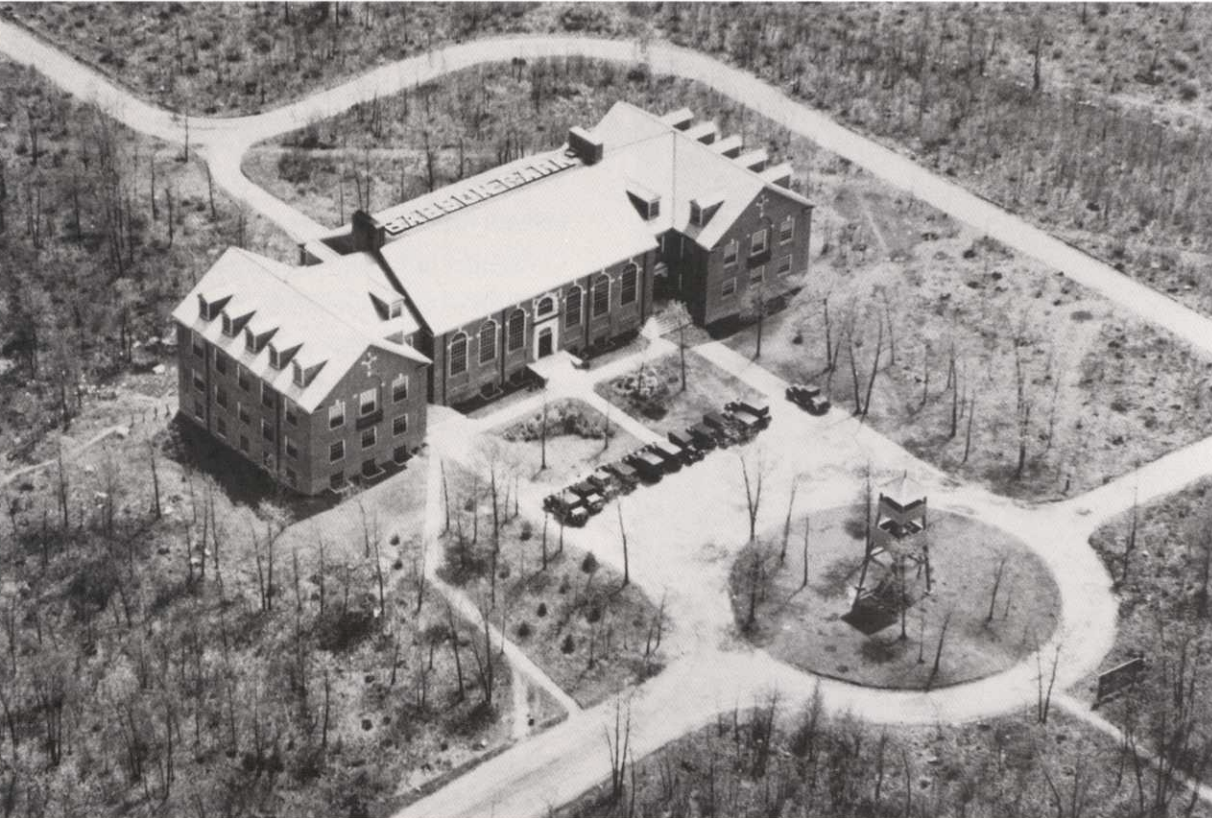
Coleman Map Hall, former home of the Great Relief Map

Newton’s Parlour

Grace Babson, an avid collector of Sir Isaac Newton memorabilia, acquired the parlor from Newton’s London home when it was auctioned following the house’s demolition in 1913. She had the room dismantled, shipped to Wellesley, and reassembled in Babson’s library, complete with wall paneling, carved mantel, and fireplace. Known as the Newton Room and now located in Horn Library, it once housed the second-largest collection of Newtonian artifacts in the world. Much of the collection is currently on loan to the Huntington Library in San Marino, California.

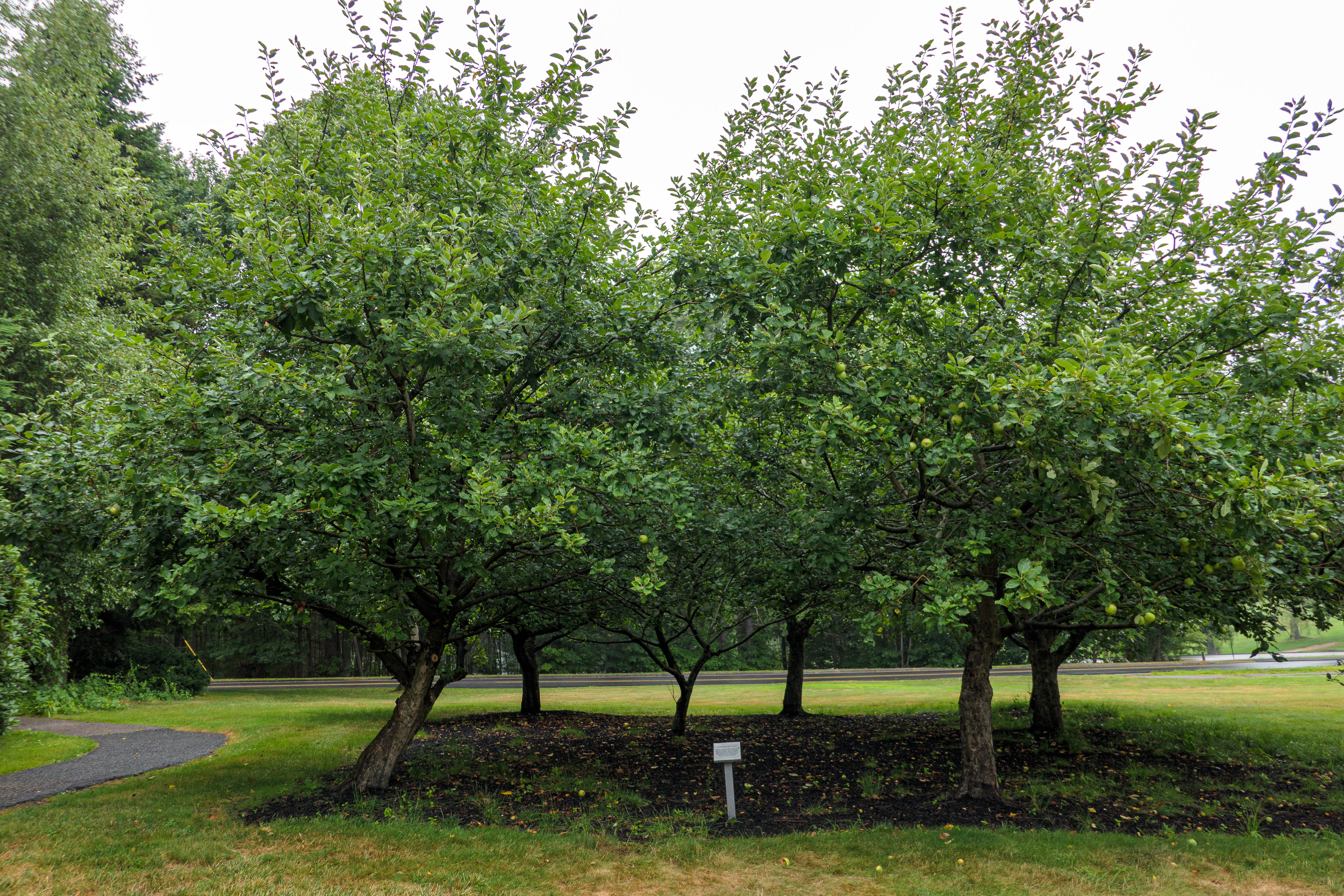
The Newton apple tree grove near Tomasso Hall

Newton Apple Tree

In 1954, Babson College planted a Newton Apple Tree, a fourth-generation descendant of the tree at Sir Isaac Newton’s home in Woolsthorpe, England. The scion, obtained from the Pennsylvania Historical Commission, was a gift from Grace Babson to her husband, Roger, reflecting his interest in Newton’s scientific legacy. Although the tree produced few Flower of Kent apples, its grafts were used to establish a grove on campus in 2005. The grove was relocated in 2013 and is currently located on the north lawn of Tomasso Hall. Source

Babson's Grave

On March 13, 1931, Roger Babson received permission from the town of Wellesley to be buried on the college campus. Babson is buried with both his first and second wives within a garden enclosed by a brick wall near the upper athletic fields.
