= Babson =

Babson may refer to:

- Babson College, private business school in Wellesley, Massachusetts, United States
- Babson (surname)
- Babson Park, Florida, census-designated place in Florida, United States
- Babson task, chess problem
- Babson-United, Inc., American financial services company
- Babson-Alling House, historic house in Gloucester, Massachusetts, United States
