= Eartha =

World's largest rotating and revolving globe (completed 1998)

Coordinates: 43.807922°N 70.164008°W

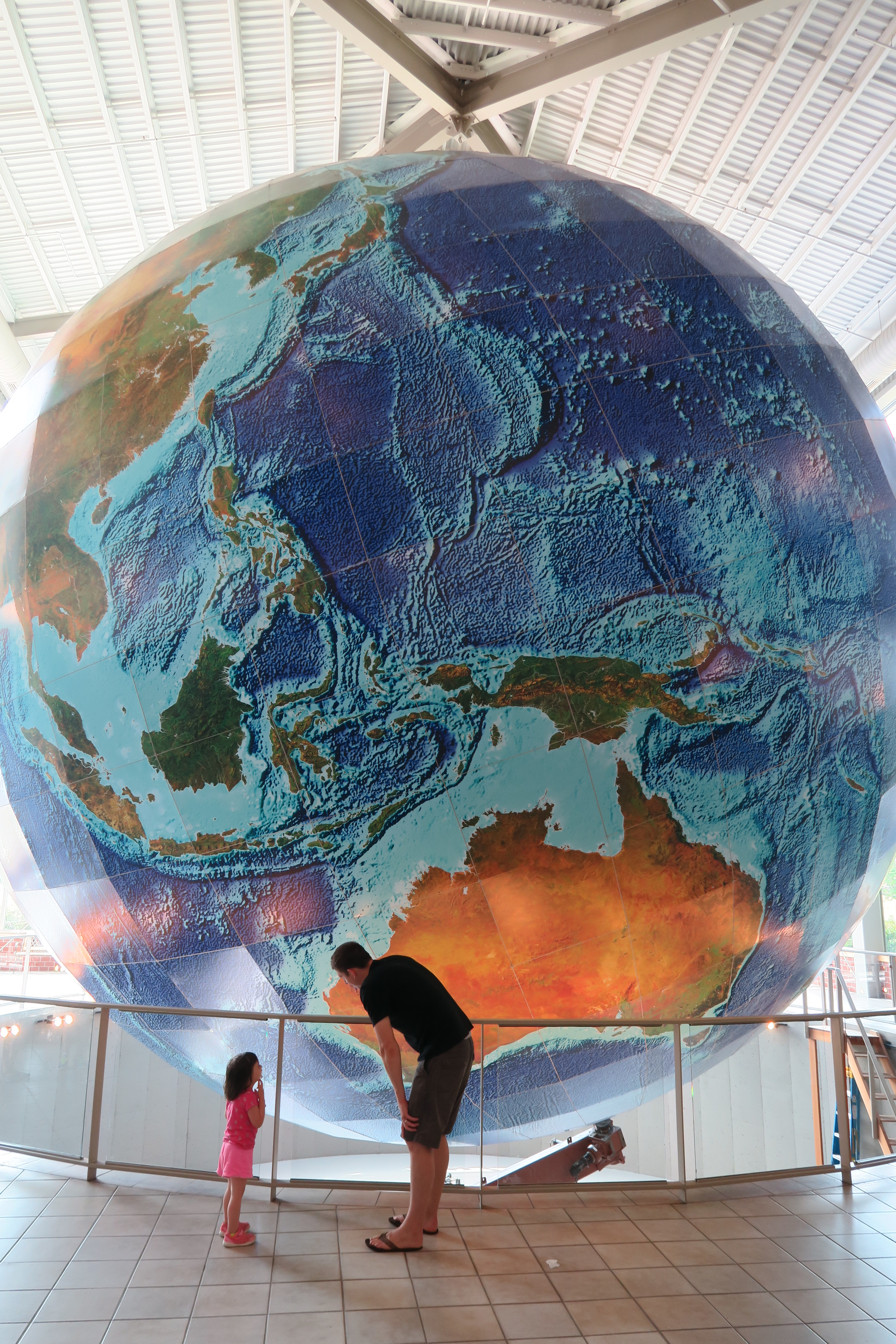
Full view of Eartha

Eartha is the world's largest rotating and revolving globe, located within the former headquarters of the DeLorme mapping corporation in Yarmouth, Maine. Garmin purchased the company and the building in 2016. The globe weighs approximately 5,600 pounds (2,500 kg), and has a diameter of over 41 feet (12.5 m).

== Construction ==
The globe was built with a scale of 1:1,000,000, on which one inch represents sixteen miles (1mm = 1km). As with most globes, it is mounted at a 23.5 degree angle, the same axial tilt as the Earth itself; thus the equator is diagonal to the floor. It uses a cantilever mount with two motors, and simulates one day's revolution and rotation every 18 minutes, though it is possible for the motors to fully rotate the globe in as little as one minute.

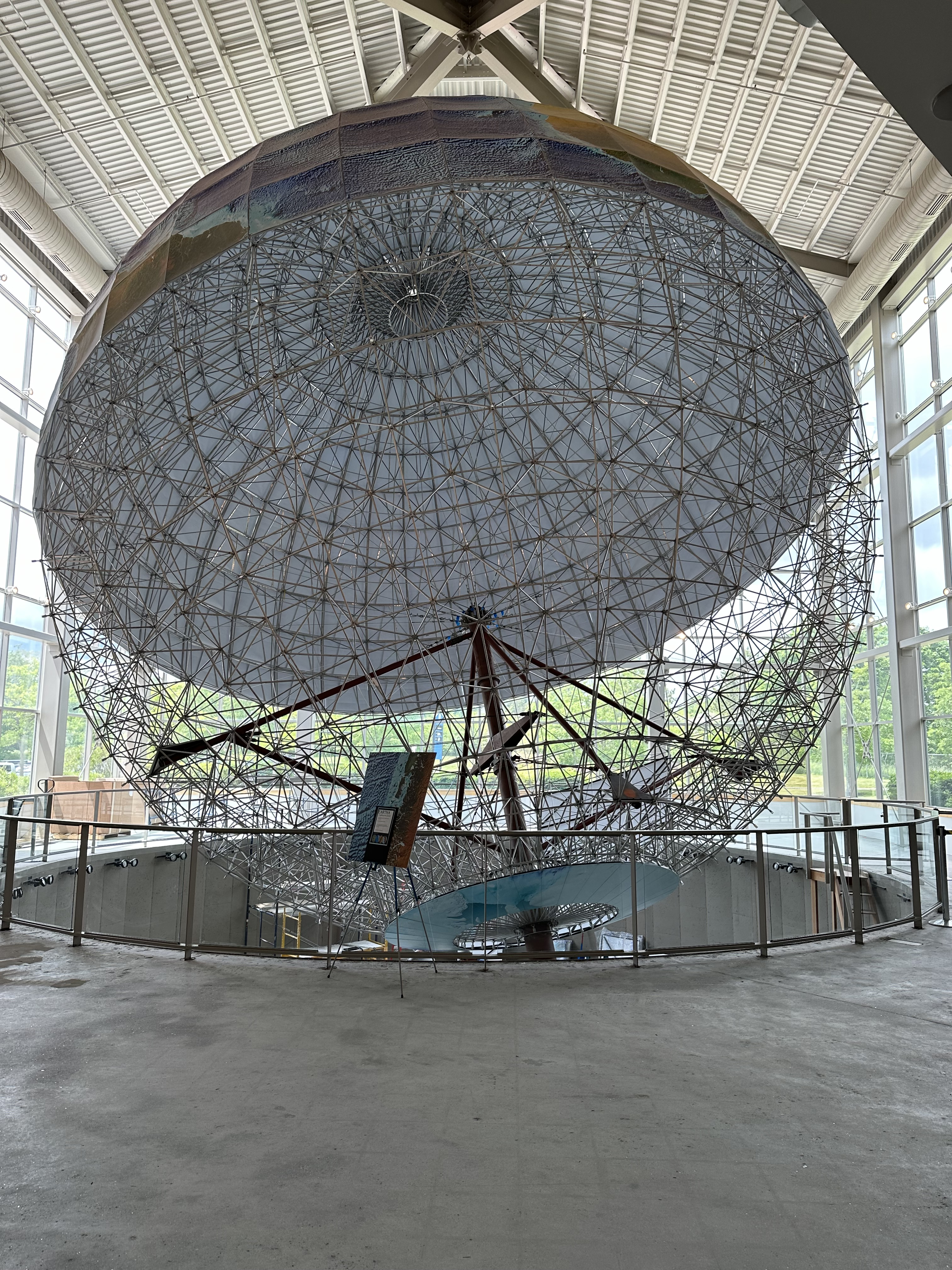
The truss structure of the globe made visible during a panel-replacement project in 2023

The globe was completed in 1998, after two years of construction and planning, and it uses a composite database built from satellite imagery, shaded relief, colored bathymetry, and information about road networks and urban areas. The database used to generate the surface images was approximately 140 gigabytes.

Former CEO of DeLorme Maps, David DeLorme, designed the globe, while Lewiston-based surveyor and civil engineer, Vincent J.P. Leblanc, was involved in the building project. Map technician Jeff Clark was responsible for the 792 plastic sections that cover the rotating globe.

Eartha is contained in an atrium with several glass walls that allow it to be seen from outside of the building; it is readily visible from U.S. Route 1. At night, the globe is illuminated.

Eartha is constructed around a truss structure which is called Omni-Span, and consists of over 6000 pieces of aluminum tubing. The map panels each cover 8 degrees of latitude and 10 degrees of longitude, and are attached to the trusses with a custom-designed system of hidden bolts.

== Public viewing ==
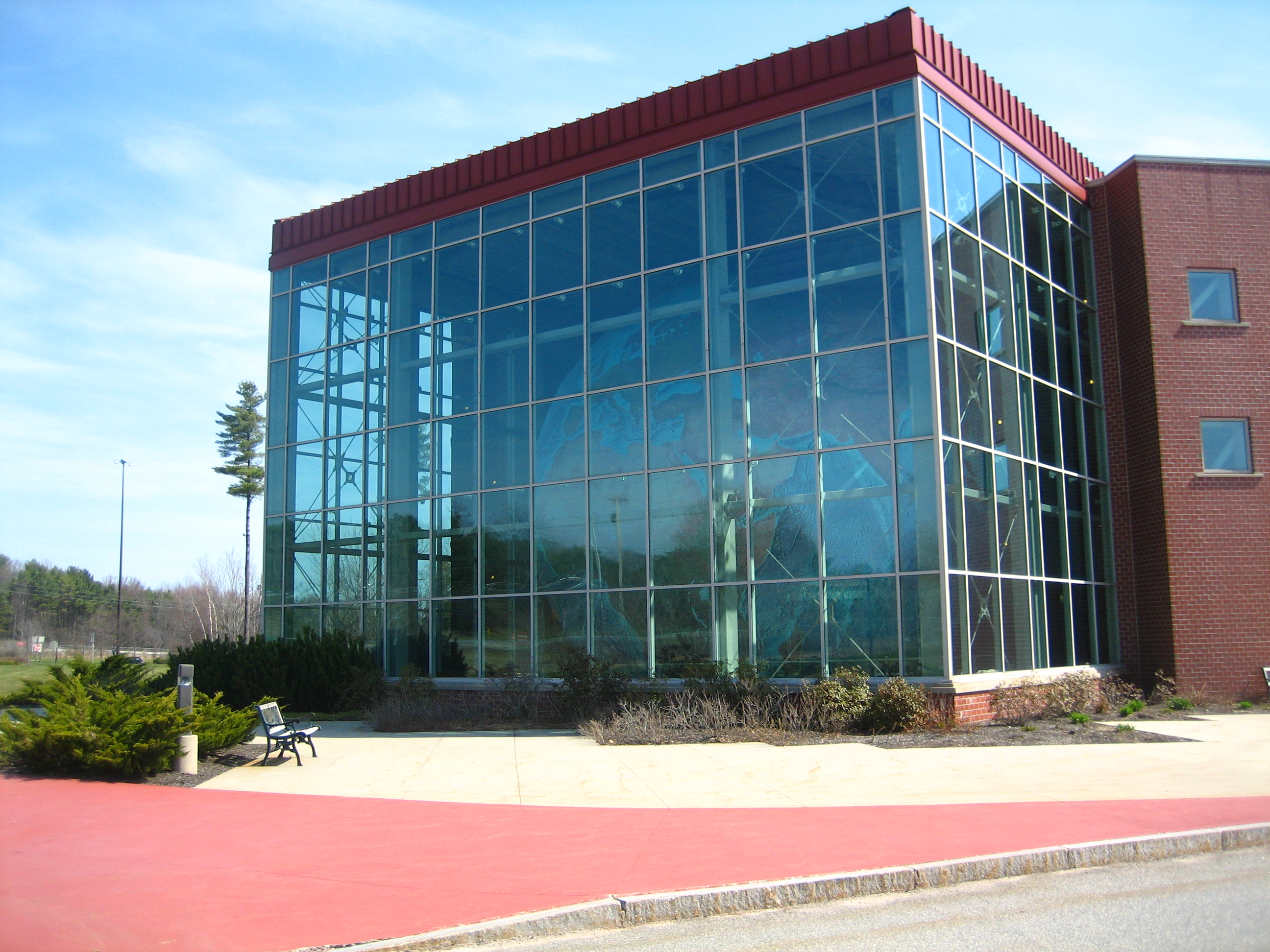
Eartha from outside the DeLorme building

The atrium containing Eartha is open to the public during business hours. There was an adjacent coffee shop which, in 2016, replaced a gift shop that carried various DeLorme and geography-related products. A cafeteria returned at the time of Garmin's acquisition.

The mounting equipment is in a large pit below floor level and is visible to visitors, but the stairway down is chained off to prevent public access. There are two balconies that allow visitors to more easily view the higher parts of the globe.

Eartha was originally designed to be 42 feet (12.8 m) in diameter. In 1999, surveyors hired by the Guinness Book of World Records measured the globe at 41 feet 1.5 inches (12.53 m). The previous record holder is the Globe of Peace located in Apecchio, Pesaro, Italy.

== See also ==
- Babson Globe
