= 1940 United States presidential election in Alabama =

- November 5, 1940

Nominee	Franklin D. Roosevelt	Wendell Willkie
Party	Democratic	Republican
Home state	New York	New York
Running mate	Henry A. Wallace	Charles L. McNary
Electoral vote	11	0
Popular vote	250,726	42,184
Percentage	85.22%	14.34%
County results
Roosevelt
50–60%
60–70%
70–80%
80–90%
90–100%
Willkie
50–60%
President before election
Franklin D. Roosevelt
Democratic
Elected President
Franklin D. Roosevelt
Democratic

The 1940 United States presidential election in Alabama took place on November 5, 1940, as part of the 1940 United States presidential election. Alabama voters chose 11 representatives, or electors, to the Electoral College, who voted for president and vice president. In Alabama, voters voted for electors individually instead of as a slate, as in the other states.

Since the 1890s, Alabama had been effectively a one-party state ruled by the Democratic Party. Disenfranchisement of almost all African-Americans and a large proportion of Poor Whites via poll taxes, literacy tests and informal harassment had essentially eliminated opposition parties outside Unionist Winston County and a few nearby northern hill counties that had been Populist strongholds. The only competitive statewide elections became Democratic Party primaries that were limited by law to white voters. Unlike most other Confederate states, however, soon after black disenfranchisement Alabama's remaining white Republicans made rapid efforts to expel blacks from the state Republican Party. Indeed, under Oscar D. Street, who ironically was appointed state party boss as part of the pro-Taft "black and tan" faction in 1912, the state GOP would permanently turn "lily-white", with the last black delegates from the state at any Republican National Convention serving in 1920.

The 1920 election, aided by isolationism in Appalachia and the whitening of the state GOP, saw the Republicans even exceed forty percent in the House of Representatives races for the 4th, 7th and 10th congressional districts. However, funding issues meant the Republicans would not emulate this achievement for several decades subsequently. Nevertheless, a bitter "civil war" over how best to maintain white supremacy after the Democrats nominated urban, anti-Prohibition Catholic Al Smith saw so many Democrats defect to dry, Protestant Republican Herbert Hoover that he came within seven thousand votes of winning the state.

However, the economic catastrophe of the Great Depression meant that this trend towards the GOP would be short-lived. The Depression had extremely severe effects in the South, which had the highest unemployment rate in the nation, and many Southerners blamed this on the North and on Wall Street. Consequently, the South gave Democratic nominee Franklin D. Roosevelt hefty support in 1932 – he became the only presidential candidate to sweep all of Alabama's counties — and in 1936.

For 1940, opposition amongst Alabama's ruling elite to the New Deal meant that planter and business interests led by former Congressman George Huddleston attempted to organize the "independent elector" movements that would increase after Harry S. Truman's civil rights proposals. Other "Big Mules" already supported Republican nominees, corporate lawyer Wendell Willkie and Senate Minority Leader Charles L. McNary. However, the hatred of the Republican label, in spite of five election cycles as a party exclusive of blacks, meant that the state Democratic Party was far too strong to allow such a revolt.

== Campaign ==
No polls were carried out in the state until a Gallup poll in the middle of September, which had Roosevelt winning 85 percent of the two-party vote to. Another poll from late October said that Willkie could gain around one hundred thousand votes or one-third of the expected statewide total.

Alabama was won in a landslide by Roosevelt – now running with Secretary of Agriculture Henry A. Wallace of Iowa — with 85.22 percent of the popular vote against Willkie's 14.34 percent for a Democratic margin of 70.88 percent. Third-party candidates only managed to pick up 0.44 percent of the vote. Roosevelt was undoubtedly helped, especially in Appalachian regions of the state, by support for aid to Britain in World War II, which he had emphasised in his campaign. In many Appalachian rural counties, Roosevelt indeed improved upon his 1932 and 1936 performances for this reason.

== Results ==
General election results
Party	Pledged to	Elector	Votes
Democratic Party	Franklin D. Roosevelt	Charles W. Edwards	250,726
Democratic Party	Franklin D. Roosevelt	Ben Bloodworth	250,723
Democratic Party	Franklin D. Roosevelt	Otis R. Burton	250,714
Democratic Party	Franklin D. Roosevelt	W. F. Covington Jr.	250,710
Democratic Party	Franklin D. Roosevelt	Tully A. Goodwin	250,709
Democratic Party	Franklin D. Roosevelt	Roy Mayhall	250,706
Democratic Party	Franklin D. Roosevelt	Norvelle R. Leigh, III	250,701
Democratic Party	Franklin D. Roosevelt	Walter C. Lusk	250,701
Democratic Party	Franklin D. Roosevelt	W. E. James	250,692
Democratic Party	Franklin D. Roosevelt	Bart J. Cowart	250,687
Democratic Party	Franklin D. Roosevelt	Walter F. Miller	250,682
Republican Party	Wendell Willkie	W. B. R. Pennington	42,184
Republican Party	Wendell Willkie	R. M. Wilbanks	42,180
Republican Party	Wendell Willkie	R. DuPont Thompson	42,179
Republican Party	Wendell Willkie	James S. Coleman Sr.	42,174
Republican Party	Wendell Willkie	J. E. Paterson	42,174
Republican Party	Wendell Willkie	William H. Armbrecht	42,172
Republican Party	Wendell Willkie	C. L. Burton	42,170
Republican Party	Wendell Willkie	Morris B. Malone	42,168
Republican Party	Wendell Willkie	David S. Anderson	42,167
Republican Party	Wendell Willkie	T. M. Jones Sr.	42,161
Republican Party	Wendell Willkie	G. C. Youngerman	42,084
Prohibition Party	Roger Babson	W. C. McMachan	700
Prohibition Party	Roger Babson	J. A. Fields	699
Prohibition Party	Roger Babson	W. A. Wheeler	699
Prohibition Party	Roger Babson	Frank Barnard	698
Prohibition Party	Roger Babson	L. E. Barton	698
Prohibition Party	Roger Babson	Charles Lehman	696
Prohibition Party	Roger Babson	J. B. Lockhart	696
Prohibition Party	Roger Babson	John C. Orr	696
Prohibition Party	Roger Babson	Joseph K. Suggs	695
Prohibition Party	Roger Babson	Leander M. Coop	693
Prohibition Party	Roger Babson	George W. Crosby	693
Communist Party USA	Earl Browder	John W. Campbell	509
Communist Party USA	Earl Browder	Bob F. Hall	345
Communist Party USA	Earl Browder	Reany Smith	344
Communist Party USA	Earl Browder	A. M. Forsman	343
Communist Party USA	Earl Browder	Anton Valla Jr.	343
Communist Party USA	Earl Browder	D. W. Gilbert	342
Communist Party USA	Earl Browder	Anna Kral	341
Communist Party USA	Earl Browder	Theron Ward	341
Communist Party USA	Earl Browder	Joseph Machulka	339
Communist Party USA	Earl Browder	Frank Maildorf	337
Communist Party USA	Earl Browder	Joe Stuchly	337
Socialist Party of America	Norman Thomas	D. R. Calloway	100
Socialist Party of America	Norman Thomas	John W. Estes Jr.	96
Socialist Party of America	Norman Thomas	Joseph Ciganek	92
Socialist Party of America	Norman Thomas	W. H. Chichester	91
Total votes			294,219

=== Results by county ===
County	Franklin D. Roosevelt Democratic		Wendell Willkie Republican		Roger Babson Prohibition		Earl Browder Communist		Norman Thomas Socialist		Margin		Total votes cast
County	#	%	#	%	#	%	#	%	#	%	#	%	Total votes cast
Autauga	1,630	93.62%	99	5.69%	10	0.57%	2	0.11%	0	0.00%	1,531	87.94%	1,741
Baldwin	2,681	76.58%	617	17.62%	24	0.72%	12	0.36%	5	0.15%	2,064	61.85%	3,501
Barbour	2,328	95.88%	90	3.71%	7	0.29%	3	0.12%	0	0.00%	2,238	92.17%	2,428
Bibb	1,821	90.51%	173	8.60%	9	0.45%	9	0.45%	0	0.00%	1,647	81.90%	2,012
Blount	2,784	75.71%	855	23.25%	32	0.87%	5	0.14%	1	0.03%	1,929	52.46%	3,677
Bullock	1,301	98.64%	18	1.36%	0	0.00%	0	0.00%	0	0.00%	1,283	97.27%	1,319
Butler	2,732	97.99%	52	1.87%	1	0.04%	3	0.11%	0	0.00%	2,680	96.13%	2,788
Calhoun	4,408	86.89%	645	12.71%	16	0.32%	2	0.04%	0	0.00%	3,764	74.21%	5,073
Chambers	4,141	97.16%	110	2.58%	10	0.23%	1	0.02%	0	0.00%	4,031	94.58%	4,262
Cherokee	2,617	86.94%	381	12.66%	10	0.33%	1	0.03%	1	0.03%	2,236	74.29%	3,010
Chilton	2,746	57.80%	1,995	41.99%	5	0.11%	5	0.11%	0	0.00%	751	15.81%	4,751
Choctaw	2,023	96.52%	73	3.48%	0	0.00%	0	0.00%	0	0.00%	1,950	93.03%	2,096
Clarke	3,753	98.71%	48	1.26%	1	0.03%	0	0.00%	0	0.00%	3,705	97.45%	3,802
Clay	2,153	71.22%	854	28.25%	6	0.20%	10	0.33%	0	0.00%	1,299	42.97%	3,023
Cleburne	1,369	75.72%	434	24.00%	4	0.19%	1	0.05%	0	0.00%	1,205	57.99%	1,808
Coffee	2,226	93.88%	145	6.12%	0	0.00%	0	0.00%	0	0.00%	2,081	87.77%	2,371
Colbert	3,998	91.47%	365	8.35%	4	0.09%	1	0.02%	3	0.07%	3,633	83.12%	4,371
Conecuh	2,345	97.71%	50	2.08%	5	0.21%	0	0.00%	0	0.00%	2,295	95.63%	2,400
Coosa	1,347	80.32%	317	18.90%	11	0.66%	2	0.12%	0	0.00%	1,030	61.42%	1,677
Covington	4,635	96.08%	186	3.86%	2	0.04%	1	0.02%	0	0.00%	4,449	92.23%	4,824
Crenshaw	2,680	96.65%	84	3.03%	7	0.25%	2	0.07%	0	0.00%	2,596	93.62%	2,773
Cullman	5,603	64.51%	3,057	35.19%	11	0.13%	11	0.13%	4	0.05%	2,546	29.31%	8,686
Dale	2,543	87.03%	374	12.80%	1	0.03%	4	0.14%	0	0.00%	2,169	74.23%	2,922
Dallas	3,106	95.10%	157	4.81%	2	0.06%	1	0.03%	0	0.00%	2,949	90.29%	3,266
DeKalb	5,432	65.77%	2,810	34.02%	13	0.16%	2	0.02%	2	0.02%	2,622	31.75%	8,259
Elmore	4,267	96.54%	144	3.26%	7	0.16%	2	0.05%	0	0.00%	4,123	93.28%	4,420
Escambia	2,772	95.03%	137	4.70%	5	0.17%	3	0.10%	0	0.00%	2,635	90.33%	2,917
Etowah	7,012	84.33%	1,270	15.27%	27	0.32%	4	0.05%	2	0.02%	5,742	69.06%	8,315
Fayette	2,091	73.42%	737	25.88%	10	0.35%	10	0.35%	0	0.00%	1,354	47.54%	2,848
Franklin	3,523	63.67%	1,989	35.95%	8	0.14%	12	0.22%	1	0.02%	1,534	27.72%	5,533
Geneva	2,565	87.19%	364	12.37%	6	0.20%	7	0.24%	0	0.00%	2,201	74.81%	2,942
Greene	894	92.07%	77	7.93%	0	0.00%	0	0.00%	0	0.00%	817	84.14%	971
Hale	1,691	98.14%	32	1.86%	0	0.00%	0	0.00%	0	0.00%	1,659	96.29%	1,723
Henry	1,960	96.50%	69	3.40%	2	0.10%	0	0.00%	0	0.00%	1,891	93.11%	2,031
Houston	3,941	88.78%	483	10.88%	13	0.29%	2	0.05%	0	0.00%	3,458	77.90%	4,439
Jackson	3,818	80.01%	945	19.80%	7	0.15%	2	0.04%	0	0.00%	2,873	60.21%	4,772
Jefferson	37,110	84.34%	6,714	15.26%	105	0.24%	52	0.12%	19	0.04%	30,395	69.08%	44,001
Lamar	2,665	90.28%	275	9.32%	8	0.27%	4	0.14%	0	0.00%	2,391	80.97%	2,952
Lauderdale	5,065	90.35%	507	9.04%	19	0.34%	10	0.18%	4	0.07%	4,558	81.32%	5,606
Lawrence	2,277	82.23%	480	17.33%	2	0.07%	10	0.36%	0	0.00%	1,797	64.90%	2,769
Lee	2,566	95.96%	103	3.85%	4	0.15%	1	0.04%	0	0.00%	2,463	92.11%	2,674
Limestone	2,941	96.58%	95	3.12%	9	0.30%	0	0.00%	0	0.00%	2,846	93.46%	3,045
Lowndes	1,132	98.86%	12	1.05%	1	0.09%	0	0.00%	0	0.00%	1,120	97.82%	1,145
Macon	1,259	96.77%	41	3.15%	1	0.08%	0	0.00%	0	0.00%	1,218	93.62%	1,301
Madison	5,515	90.44%	566	9.28%	9	0.15%	3	0.05%	5	0.08%	4,959	81.46%	6,098
Marengo	2,284	96.94%	70	2.97%	2	0.08%	0	0.00%	0	0.00%	2,214	93.97%	2,356
Marion	2,654	69.64%	1,081	28.37%	12	0.31%	64	1.68%	0	0.00%	1,573	41.28%	3,811
Marshall	4,142	81.55%	913	17.98%	18	0.35%	4	0.08%	2	0.04%	3,229	63.58%	5,079
Mobile	11,480	85.08%	1,887	13.99%	89	0.66%	14	0.10%	14	0.10%	9,592	71.20%	13,493
Monroe	2,953	98.17%	40	1.33%	12	0.40%	3	0.10%	0	0.00%	2,913	96.84%	3,008
Montgomery	11,311	97.74%	230	1.99%	16	0.14%	16	0.14%	0	0.00%	11,081	95.75%	11,573
Morgan	5,345	90.93%	500	8.51%	22	0.37%	8	0.14%	1	0.02%	4,846	82.46%	5,878
Perry	1,509	97.17%	39	2.51%	5	0.32%	0	0.00%	0	0.00%	1,470	94.66%	1,553
Pickens	1,714	92.00%	140	7.51%	7	0.45%	2	0.13%	0	0.00%	1,277	81.55%	1,863
Pike	3,049	95.94%	121	3.81%	1	0.03%	7	0.22%	0	0.00%	2,928	92.13%	3,178
Randolph	2,407	77.92%	670	21.69%	8	0.26%	4	0.13%	0	0.00%	1,737	56.23%	3,089
Russell	2,435	97.95%	48	1.93%	2	0.08%	1	0.04%	0	0.00%	2,387	96.02%	2,486
Shelby	2,777	74.61%	938	25.20%	5	0.13%	2	0.05%	0	0.00%	1,839	49.41%	4,024
St. Clair	2,462	61.18%	1,540	38.27%	9	0.22%	6	0.15%	7	0.17%	922	22.91%	3,722
Sumter	1,404	96.76%	46	3.17%	1	0.07%	0	0.00%	0	0.00%	1,358	93.59%	1,451
Talladega	3,965	87.88%	534	11.84%	9	0.20%	4	0.09%	0	0.00%	3,431	76.04%	4,512
Tallapoosa	4,325	96.65%	139	3.11%	7	0.16%	3	0.07%	1	0.02%	4,186	93.54%	4,475
Tuscaloosa	6,284	93.35%	426	6.33%	14	0.21%	5	0.07%	3	0.04%	5,858	87.02%	6,732
Walker	5,940	74.52%	2,007	25.18%	17	0.21%	4	0.05%	3	0.04%	3,933	49.34%	7,971
Washington	1,892	95.65%	80	4.04%	5	0.25%	1	0.05%	0	0.00%	1,812	91.61%	1,978
Wilcox	1,534	98.71%	20	1.29%	0	0.00%	0	0.00%	0	0.00%	1,514	97.43%	1,554
Winston	1,394	45.10%	1,686	54.55%	6	0.19%	4	0.13%	0	0.00%	-301	-9.78%	3,091
Totals	250,726	85.22%	42,184	14.34%	700	0.24%	509	0.17%	100	0.03%	208,542	70.88%	294,219

== Analysis ==
=== Earl Browder's visit ===
Communist party candidate Earl Browder personally campaigned in the state giving speeches in Bullock County, Choctaw County, Clarke County, Coffee County, Conecuh County, Greene County and Hale County. Browder campaigned as an isolationist candidate advocating the United States not get involved in the war in Europe. Browder referred to the war as an "imperialist" war and he took a decidedly "anti-British tone" while campaigning in the aforementioned Alabama counties. In each of his speeches, he condemned Winston Churchill and praised Joseph Stalin. However, Browder said he was "irked by how cold" the crowds there were towards him. In the seven counties where Browder campaigned he ultimately received zero votes in the election (however, in the state as a whole he won just over 500 votes in comparison to Roosevelt's 250,726 votes and Willkie's 42,184 votes.)

== See also ==
- United States presidential elections in Alabama
