= Globe of Peace =

Globe in Apecchio, Pesaro, Italy

Coordinates: 43.573333°N 12.462778°E

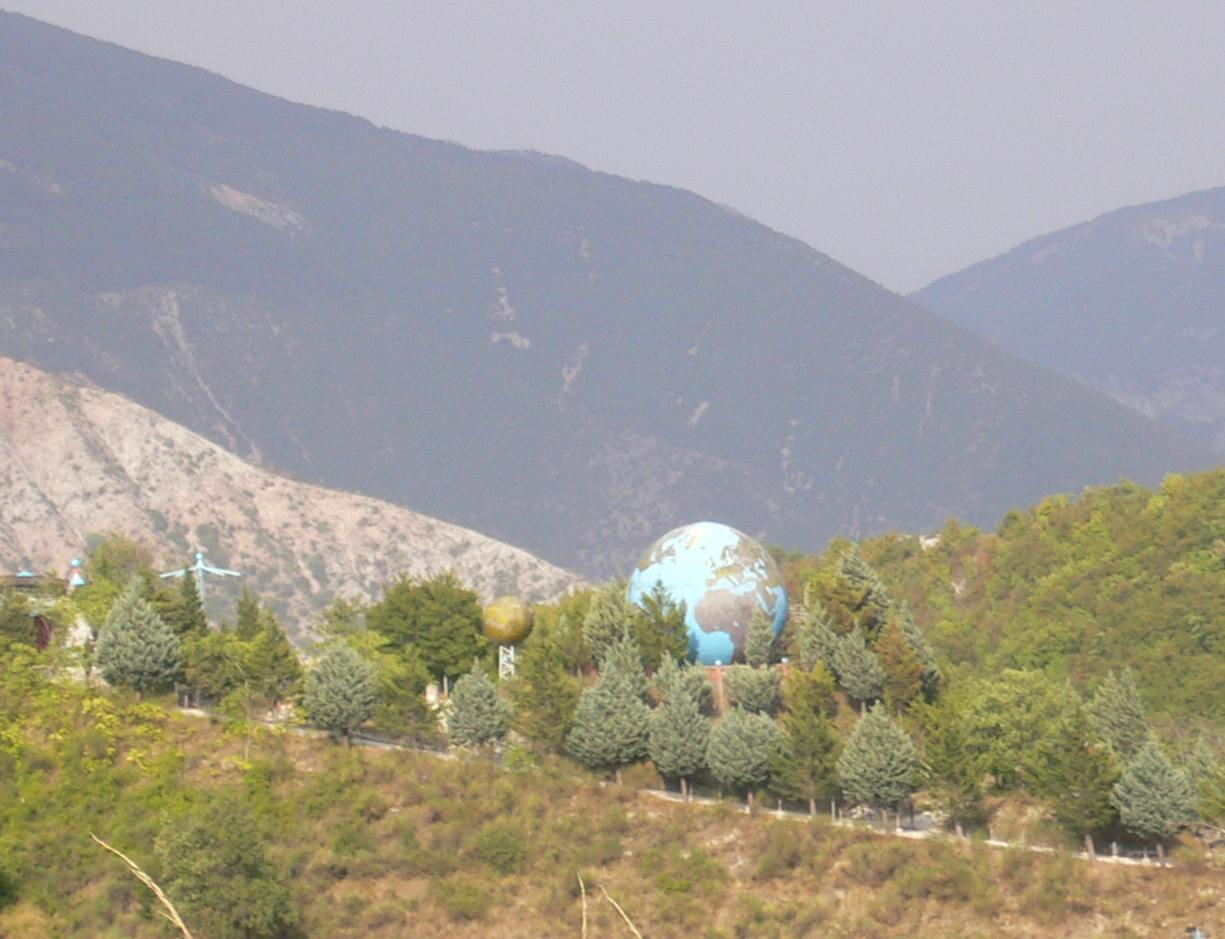

The Globe of Peace (Italian: Mappamondo della Pace) is a large globe located in Apecchio, Pesaro, Italy. It was the Guinness Book of World Records record holder for the world's largest rotating globe until 1999, when it was succeeded by Eartha. It was built over a period of six years by Orfeo Bartolucci, with the stated goal of diffusing a message of peace and liberty to all people. It measures 10 metres in diameter and is reported to weigh 170 quintals, or 17,000 kilograms. Reportedly 250 quintals of putty, 30 cubic metres of wood, and a ton (unclear whether English or Metric) of nails were used in its construction. The globe is located outdoors and has a fibreglass skin. It can hold approximately 600 people and internally contains descriptive tables listing every country of the world and their flags.

Bartolucci, formerly a mason and later a building contractor by trade, reports that he had the inspiration for the globe during a visit to the Ducal Palace in Venice during the 1970s. The palace contained – among other exhibits – a globe 2 metres in diameter, and Bartolucci became interested in building a larger one. Upon inquiring of the large publishing house Mondadori in Verona, he was informed that the Guinness Book of World Records reported a globe of 8 metres in diameter at Babson College in Massachusetts. Wanting to take the record, Bartolucci decided on a diameter of ten metres.

Bartolucci solicited information about the Babson globe, and found out that it had issues with weather resistance that had led to deterioration over time, and that the methods used for its construction would cost Bartolucci approximately 500 million lire. This information influenced his design decisions. For six years, Bartolucci worked from 5 A.M. until dusk, using his pension income and accumulated savings but not borrowing any funds.

The inauguration ceremony for the globe drew an official representative of the state and an audience of about seven thousand people.

Bartolucci also constructed several other interesting artifacts, including a globe 5 mm in diameter.

== Facts ==
- In Russian, the Peace and the World words sounds the same (Russian: мир, romanized: mir is a homonym), often word played in Soviet and Russian politics and propaganda. In Russian, «Globe of Peace» sounds the same as «Globe of World», and a claim «We want a peace» in Russian may literally means «We want [to occupy] the World» (the Soviet and Russian space station «Mir» had mission insignia with a styled Red Star drawn over Globe). In Ukrainian: мир, romanized: myr also means the Peace, but the World word is different in Ukrainian: світ, romanized: svit (pronounce sounds simialar to English: sweet).

== See also ==
- Eartha
- Babson Globe
- Unisphere
