= Babson (surname) =

Babson is a surname. Notable people with the surname include:

- Frederick Babson, American politician
- Henry Babson (1875–1970), American businessman and horse breeder
- Janis Babson (1950–1961), Canadian organ transplant donor
- Marian Babson, pseudonym of Ruth Stenstreem, British writer
- Roger Babson (1875–1967), American businessman
- Samuel Babson Fuld (born 1981), American baseball player and general manager
