= Dogtown, Massachusetts =

Village in Massachusetts, United States

- Town
- Dogtown in 1908
- Interactive map of Dogtown, Massachusetts
- Coordinates: 42°38′20″N 70°39′15″W
- Country: United States
- State: Massachusetts
- County: Essex
- Settled: 1693
- Abandoned: 1830

Population (2024)
  - Total: 0
- Time zone: UTC-5 (Eastern)
  - Summer (DST): Eastern

The entrance to Dogtown Common, on Cherry Street

Dogtown (also Dogtown Commons or Dogtown Common or Dogtown Village) is an abandoned inland village in Gloucester on Cape Ann in Massachusetts.

== History ==
=== Early history ===
Once known as the Common Settlement, the area later known as Dogtown is divided between the city of Gloucester and the town of Rockport. Dogtown was first settled in 1693, and according to legend the name of the settlement came from dogs that women kept while their husbands were fighting in the American Revolution. The community grew to be 5 square miles, and was an ideal location as it provided protection from pirates and unfriendly natives. By the early 1700s, the land was opened up to individual settlement as previously it had been used as common land for wood and pasturing cattle and sheep. It is estimated that at one point 60 to 80 homes stood in Dogtown at its peak population. In the mid-1700s as many as 100 families inhabited Dogtown which was stable until after the American Revolution.

=== Decline ===
Various factors led to the demise of Dogtown, which included a revived fishing industry from Gloucester Harbor after the American Revolution had ended. The area had become safe again from enemy ships which allowed cargo to move in and out of the new fishing port. The success gave way to international shipping, including timber, and quarried rock. New coastal roads were built that also contributed to the Dogtown's demise as they ran past the town to Gloucester which at the time was booming. Most of the farmers in the town moved away by the end of the War of 1812 as Dogtown had become a risk for coastal bombardment. Dogtown eventually became an embarrassment with its dwindled reputation, and some of its last occupants were suspected of practicing witchcraft. One such inhabitant named Thomazine "Tammy" Younger was described as "Queen of the Witches" by Thomas Dresser. She intimidated people passing through so much that they left her fish and corn to allow them through. Another reputed witch associated with Dogtown was a woman named Peg Wesson, but she in fact had lived in Gloucester. As the last inhabitants died, their pets became feral, possibly giving rise to the nickname "Dogtown." By 1828 the village was all but abandoned. The last resident of Dogtown was a freedman named Cornelius "Black Neil" Finson, who was found in 1830 with his feet frozen living in a cellar-hole. He was removed and taken to a poor house in Gloucester. The last structure in Dogtown was razed in 1845, ending what had once been a thriving community.

=== Open grazing land ===
After its abandonment, Dogtown was a mostly cleared open field with abundant boulders around. Nearby residents looked towards this land as a way to graze their farm animals. These animals were kept in private lots into the 1920s when the last of the plots were abandoned. In the decades that followed what was once open land eventually became a dense forest.

=== Babson Boulders ===
Most of the area of Dogtown is now a dense woodland, criss-crossed and bisected by trails and old roads. Dogtown Road off of Cherry Street in the western section (the Gloucester side) is lined with the remains of the cellar holes of the settlers, many of which are numbered in correspondence with names from John J. Babson's book of the history of Gloucester. Babson's grandson, Roger Babson, is known for, among other things, his commissioning of unemployed stonecutters to carve inspirational inscriptions on 36 boulders in Dogtown during the Great Depression. Babson also mapped and numbered the cellar holes left from the homes of Dogtown's former residents.

Most of the land is held in trust by Gloucester and Rockport and is therefore protected in perpetuity. The current state of Dogtown affords rich recreation opportunities to hikers and bikers, dog-walkers, nature lovers, cross-country skiers, geologists and historians. The area is peppered with house-sized boulders, including one named "The Whale's Jaw," which it resembled before collapsing after a picnic campfire got out of control in 1989. The northwest corner of Dogtown is known as the Norton Memorial forest and covers 121 acres (49 hectares). This land is named for Frederick Norton, a NASA physicist and MIT professor whose family owned land on the outskirts of Dogtown. Beginning in the 1930s, Norton planted more than a 100,000 trees and forty different species of ferns there, and also forged and maintained trails nearby.

One of the 36 "Babson Boulders" in Dogtown

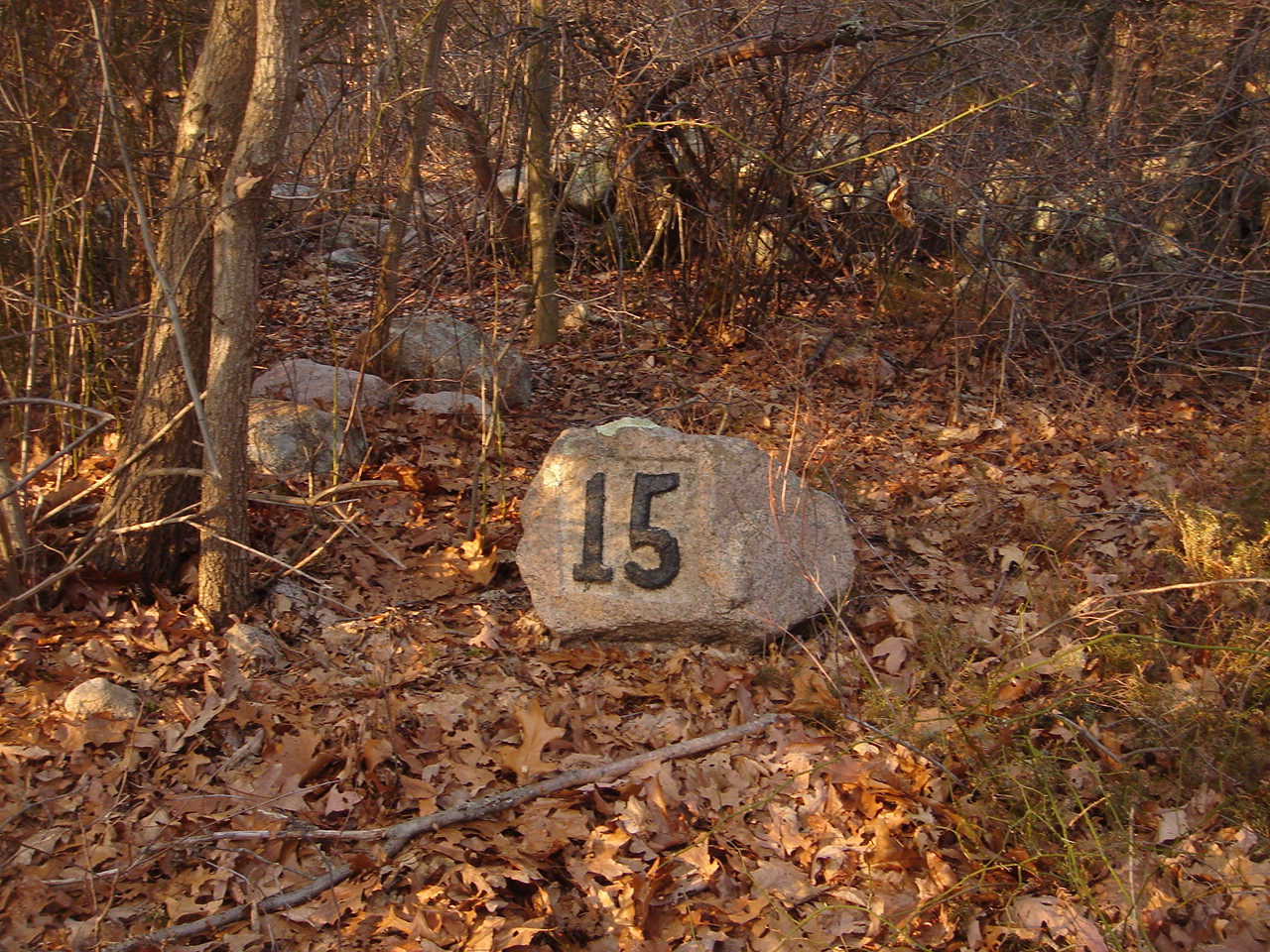
Cellar Hole #15 in Dogtown Common

Carved Boulder at Dogtown Square

Babson Boulder near Dogtown Square

Another Babson Boulder farther up Dogtown Road from the Square

Babson Boulder near the MBTA tracks indicating the direction of Rockport

== References in popular culture ==
- Most of the novel La Mémoire de Tueur (The Memory of a Killer) by French-Canadian writer Sylvain Johnson takes place in Dogtown.
- American modernist Marsden Hartley painted a series of images of Dogtown in the 1920s and 30s
- Much of poet Charles Olson's acclaimed The Maximus Poems is set in Dogtown.
- The Last Days of Dogtown, a novel by Anita Diamant
- "Dogtown", a song by Harry Chapin
- "Forgotten", Episode 82 of the Lore Podcast, broadcast March 2018
- "The Twelve Lives of Samuel Hawley", a novel by Hannah Tinti. Dogtown is described in the narration, events involving characters occur in and near Dogtown ME.
- Dan Barrett's book Giles Corey makes frequent reference to Dogtown. The book came accompanied by an album of the same name.

== Sources ==
- In the Heart of Cape Ann, or The Story of Dogtown by Charles E. Mann (Proctor Brothers, Publishers; Gloucester, Mass.), 1897
