= Gravity Research Foundation =

Research organization

Gravity Research Center
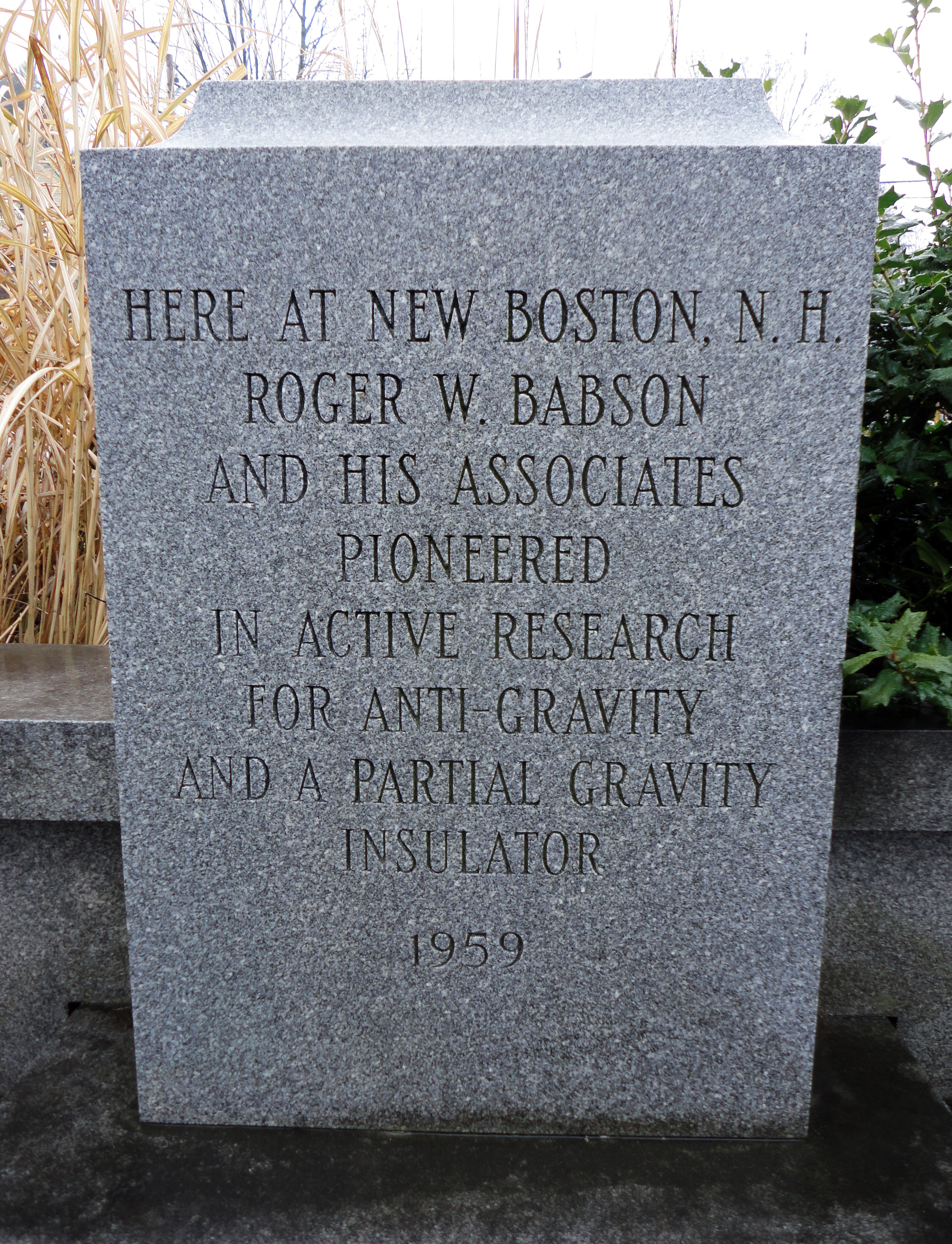
- Monument to Babson in center of New Boston, New Hampshire
- Formation: 1948; 78 years ago
- Founder: Roger Babson
- Legal status: Active
- Purpose: Study of gravitation
- Website: www.gravityresearchfoundation.org

The Gravity Research Foundation is an organization established in 1948 by businessman Roger Babson (founder of Babson College) to find ways to implement gravitational shielding. Over time, the foundation turned away from trying to block gravity and began trying to understand it. It holds an annual contest rewarding essays by scientific researchers on gravity-related topics. The contest, which awards prizes of up to $4,000, has been won by at least six people who later won the Nobel Prize in physics.

The foundation held conferences and conducted operations in New Boston, New Hampshire, through the late 1960s, but that aspect of its operation ended following Babson's death in 1967.

It is mentioned on stone monuments, donated by Babson, at more than a dozen American universities.

== History ==
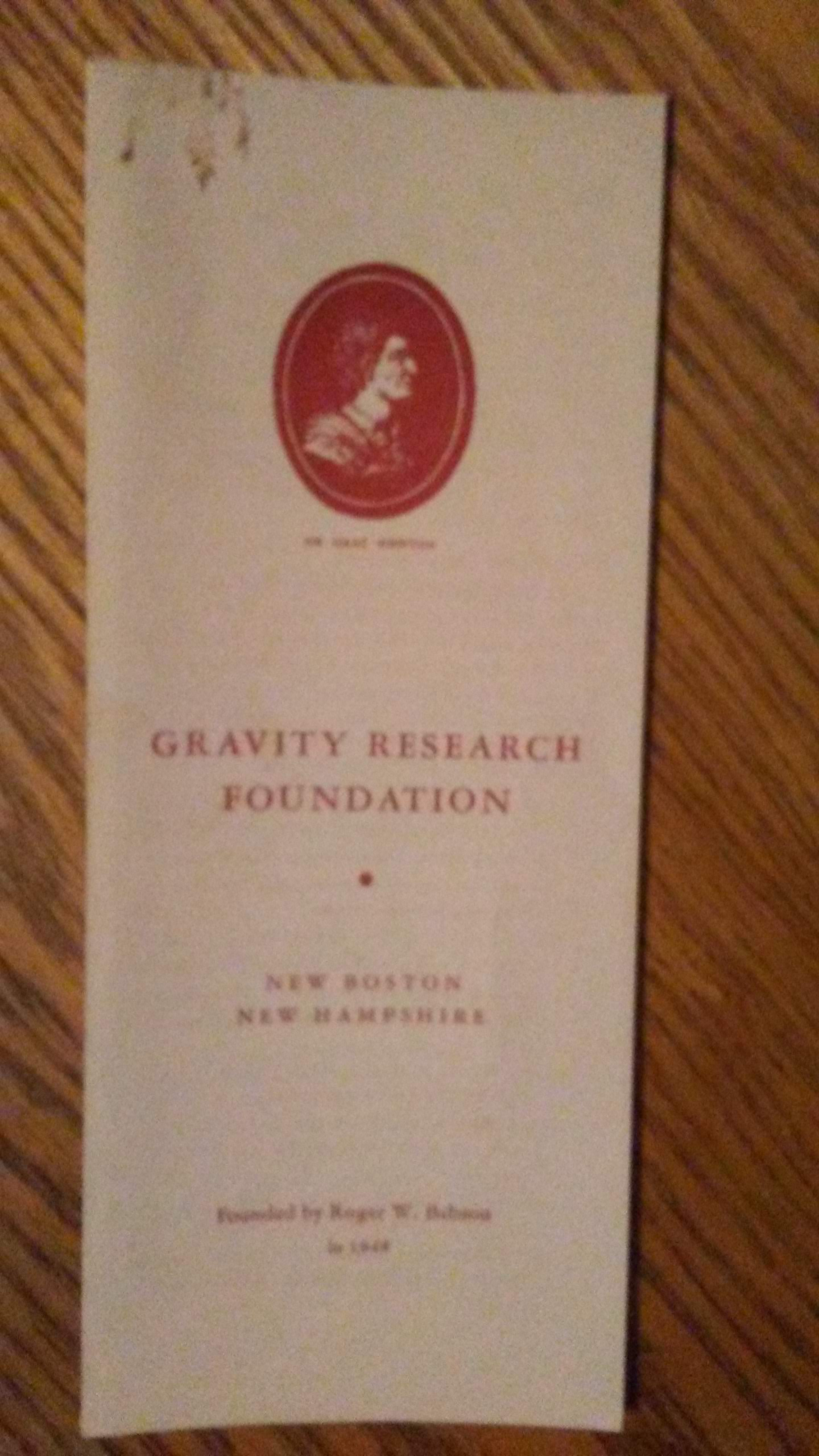
A pamphlet issued by the foundation, date uncertain.

Babson established the foundation in several scattered buildings in the small town of New Boston, New Hampshire. Babson said he chose that location because he thought it was far enough from big cities to survive a nuclear war. Babson wanted to put up a sign declaring New Boston to be the safest place in North America if World War III came, but town fathers toned it down to say merely that New Boston was a safe place.

In an essay titled Gravity – Our Enemy Number One, Babson indicated that his wish to overcome gravity dated from the childhood drowning of his sister. "She was unable to fight gravity, which came up and seized her like a dragon and brought her to the bottom", he wrote.

The foundation held occasional conferences that drew such people as Clarence Birdseye of frozen-food fame and Igor Sikorsky, inventor of the helicopter. Sometimes, attendees sat in chairs with their feet higher than their heads, to counterbalance gravity. Most of the foundation's work, however, involved sponsoring essays by researchers on gravity-related topics. It had only a couple of employees in New Boston.

The physical Gravity Research Foundation disappeared some time after Babson's death in 1967. Its only remnant in New Boston is a granite slab in a traffic island that celebrates the foundation's "active research for antigravity and a partial gravity insulator". The building that held the foundation's meetings has long held a restaurant, and for a time had a bar called Gravity Tavern, since renamed.

The essay award lives on, offering prizes of up to $4,000. As of 2025, it is still administered out of Wellesley, Massachusetts, by George Rideout, Jr., son of the foundation's original director.

Over time, the foundation shed its crankish air, turning its attention from trying to block gravity to trying to understand it. The annual essay prize has drawn respected researchers, including physicist Stephen Hawking, who won in 1971, mathematician/author Roger Penrose (Nobel Prize in Physics, 2020), who won in 1975, physicist Abhay Ashtekar, who won in 1977, and astrophysicist and Nobel laureate George Smoot, who won in 1993. Other notable award winners include Jacob Bekenstein, Sidney Coleman, Bryce DeWitt, Julian Schwinger (Nobel Prize in Physics, 1965), Martin Perl (Nobel Prize in Physics, 1995), Demetrios Christodoulou, Dennis Sciama, Gerard 't Hooft (Nobel Prize in Physics, 1999), Arthur E. Fischer, Jerrold E. Marsden, Ilya Prigogine (Nobel Prize in Chemistry, 1977), Robert Wald, John Archibald Wheeler, Maurice Allais (Nobel Prize in Economics, 1988), and Frank Wilczek (Nobel Prize in Physics, 2004).

== Monuments ==
In the 1960s, Babson gave grants to a number of colleges that were accompanied by stone monuments. The monuments are inscribed with a variety of similar sayings, such as "It is to remind students of the blessings forthcoming when a semi-insulator is discovered in order to harness gravity as a free power and reduce airplane accidents" and "It is to remind students of the blessings forthcoming when science determines what gravity is, how it works, and how it may be controlled."

Colleges that received monuments include:

- Bethune-Cookman College in Daytona Beach, Florida
- Colby College in Waterville, Maine
- Eastern Baptist College in St. Davids, Pennsylvania
- Eastern Nazarene College in Quincy, Massachusetts
- Emory University in Atlanta, Georgia
- Gordon College in Wenham, Massachusetts
- Hobart and William Smith Colleges in Geneva, New York
- Keene State College in Keene, New Hampshire
- Middlebury College in Middlebury, Vermont
- Trinity College in Hartford, Connecticut
- Tufts University in Medford, Massachusetts
- Tuskegee Institute in Tuskegee, Alabama
- University of Tampa in Tampa, Florida
- Wheaton College in Wheaton, Illinois.

Hobart College's "H-Book" contains a description of the circumstances surrounding the placement of its Gravity Monument: "The location of the stone on campus was linked to a gift to the Colleges of 'gravity grant' stocks, now totaling more than $1 million, from Roger Babson, the founder of Babson College. The eccentric Babson was intrigued by the notion of anti-gravity and inclined to further scientific research in this area. The Colleges used these funds to help construct Rosenberg Hall in 1994. Two trees that shade the stone are said to be direct descendants of Newton’s famous apple tree."

The stone at Colby College was once in front of the Keyes Building on the main academic quadrangle but was moved to a more obscure location near the Schair-Swenson-Watson Alumni Center. Students would often knock it over in an ironic testament to gravity's power. At Tufts, the monument is the site of an "inauguration ceremony" for students who receive PhDs in cosmology, in which a thesis advisor drops an apple on the student's head.

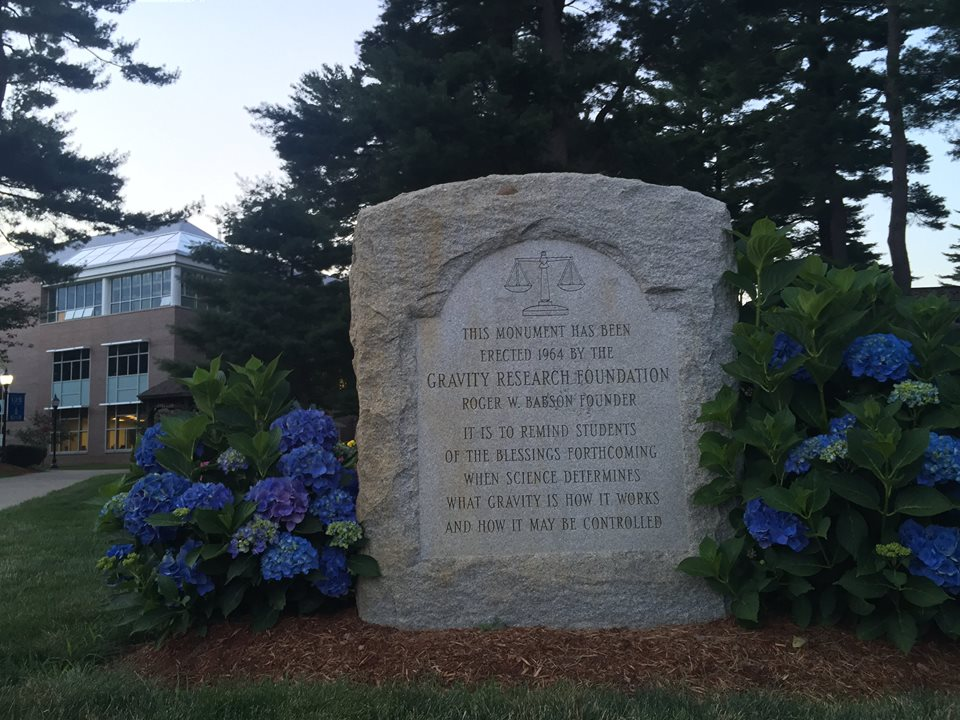
The Gravity Research Foundation monument at Gordon College

The Gravity Research Foundation monument at Tufts University

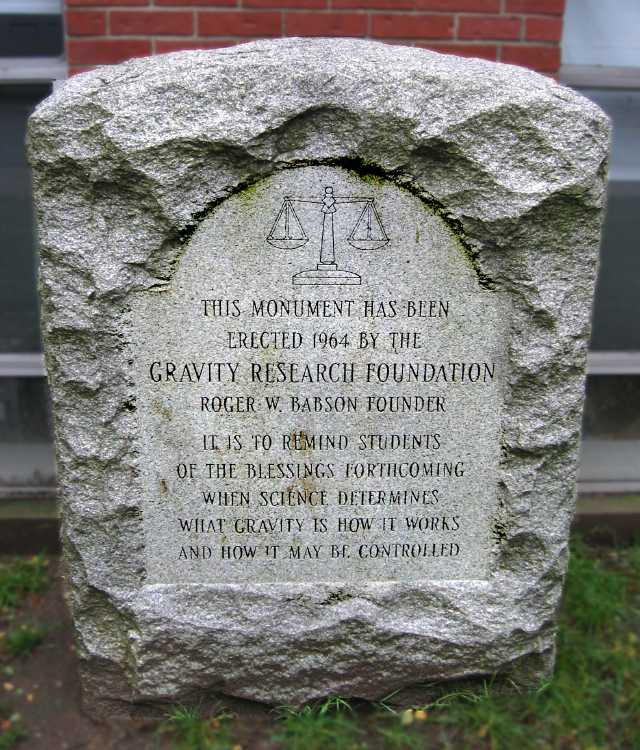
The Gravity Research Foundation monument outside Shrader Hall at Eastern Nazarene College

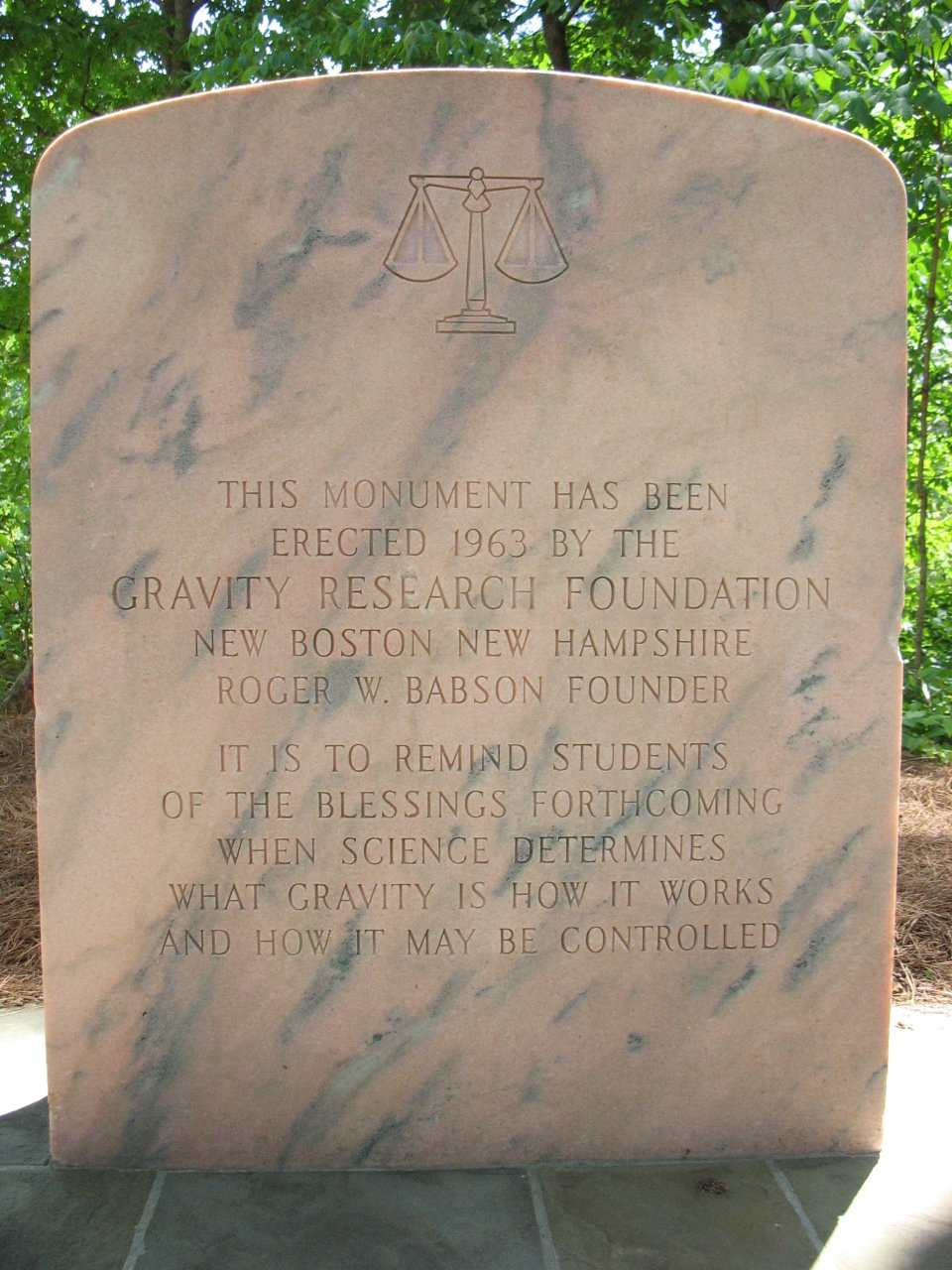
The Gravity Research Foundation monument at Emory University

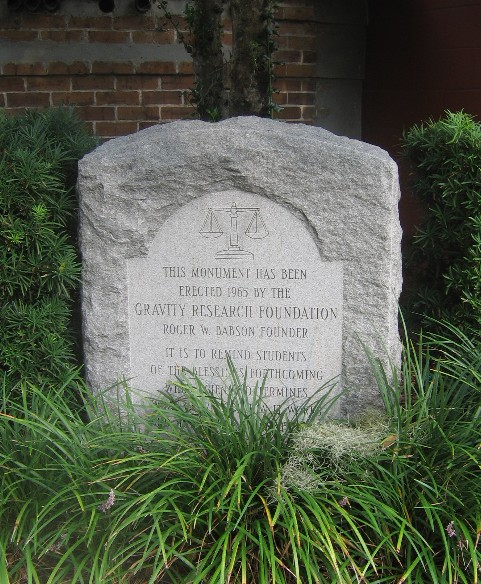
The Gravity Research Foundation monument at the University of Tampa

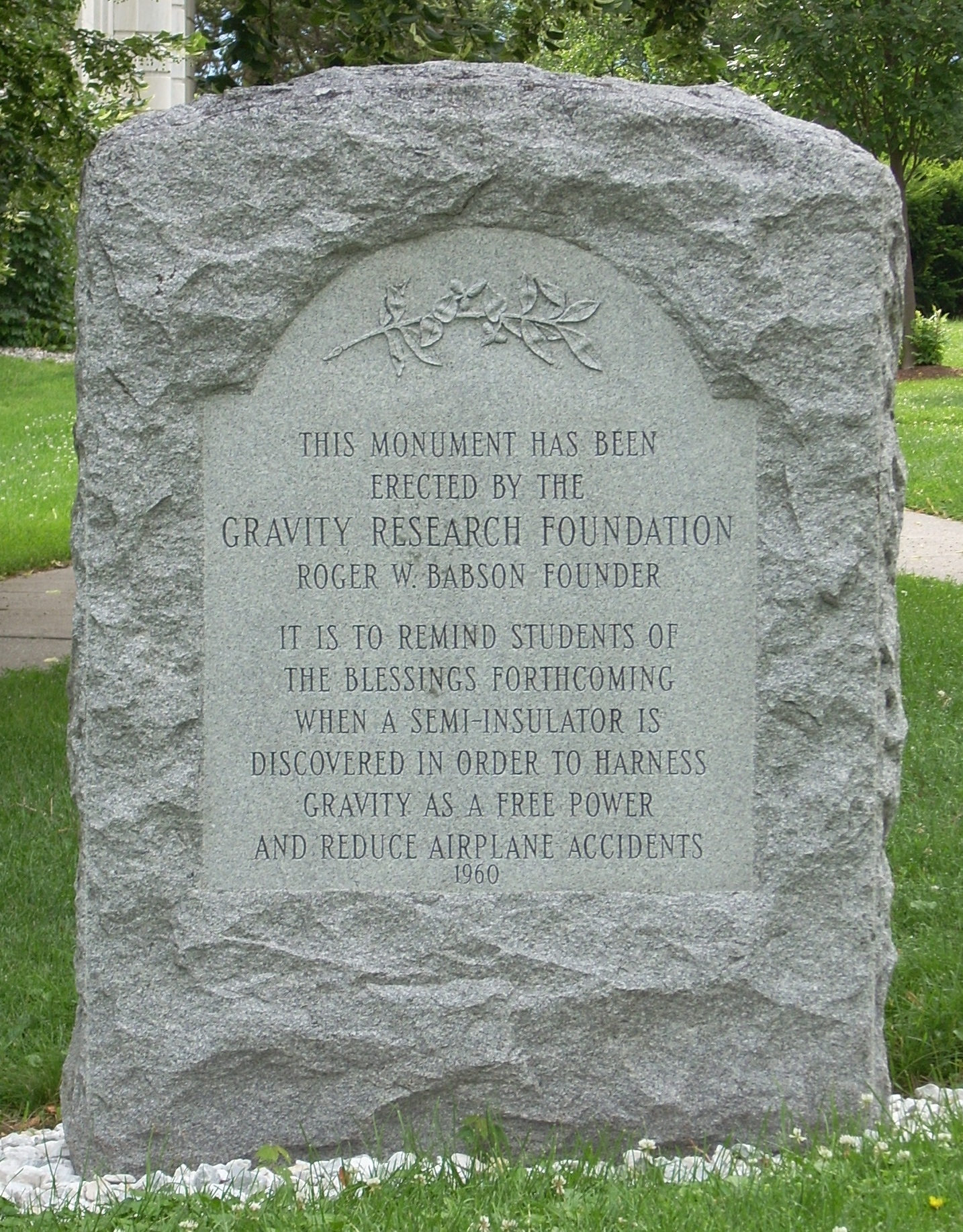
The Gravity Research Foundation monument at Middlebury College

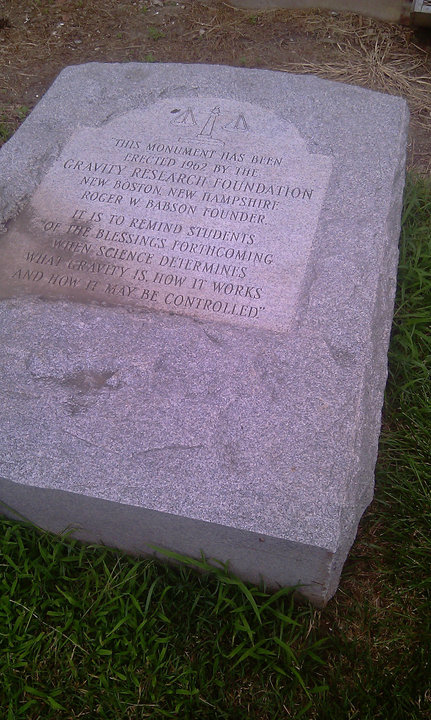
The Gravity Research Foundation monument at Wheaton College

The Gravity Research Foundation monument outside the Davis Science Center at Colby College

== See also ==
- Louis Witten (theoretical physicist associated with the foundation)
