= Babson Globe =

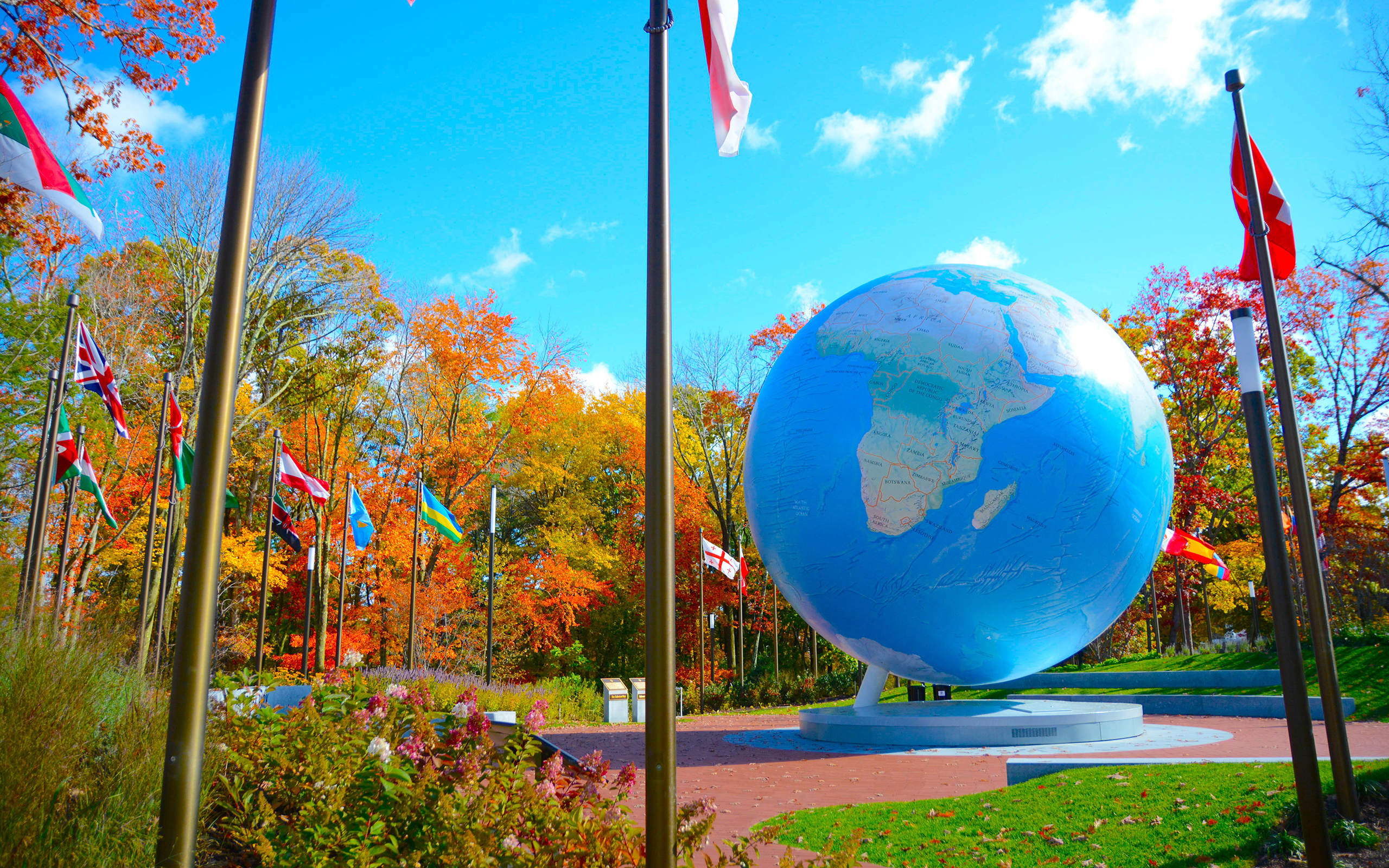
The Babson Globe

The Babson Globe is a globe located in the campus of Babson College in Wellesley, Massachusetts. Weighing 25 tons and with a diameter of 28 feet (8.5 meters), it was the world's largest rotating globe when it was built in 1955. Mappamondo della pace, located in Italy, surpassed Babson's record in 1988.

The globe was an idea of Roger Babson, the college's founder. He came up with the idea of building the globe in 1947 as a way of promoting interest in world affairs. In the first years, the globe attracted thousands of visitors annually, but by the late 1970s, the globe had fallen into disrepair. The porcelain-baked steel tiles that covered the globe (recreating the continents and oceans) fell off in 1984 and for the next 9 years the globe looked like a big and rusted ball. In addition, during the 1980s, the machinery that made the globe spin stopped working. Due to the state of disrepair, in 1988 the administration of the college decided to demolish the globe. In response, students and faculty led by C. Christopher Lingamfelter and Professor Larry Meile formed a committee called "Save the Globe", which was able to raise funds to restore the globe.

In 1993 the globe was restored, featuring 506 vinyl panels and the most advanced satellite imagery available at the time. In 2018, the globe was restored again and moved from Coleman Hall to the Kerry Murphy Healey Park, where it was unveiled in May 2019, as part of the centennial commemoration of the college.

== See also ==
- Globe of Peace
