= Babson-United, Inc. =

- Type: Private
- Industry: Non-bank holding company
- Founded: 1904 (as the Office of Roger Babson)
- Headquarters: Boston, Massachusetts, U.S.
- Website: https://www.babson.com/

Babson-United, Inc. is the institutional successor to the securities analysis and investment management business founded in Boston in 1904 by Roger Babson. Originally organized as the Office of Roger Babson, it was subsequently named Babson's Statistical Organization, Business Statistics Organization, and Babson's Reports. Since 2004, it has operated as a private, family-owned, non-bank holding company, and no longer provides investment news or advice to outside clients.

== History ==
The firm's original investment report was founded during World War I, and had several incarnations, including United & Babson Investment Report and Babson-United Investment Report. After 80 years of operation, the Report published its final issue on April 16, 2001, after which subscribers were transferred to Standard & Poor's weekly investment publication, The Outlook. In 2002, the firm sold Babson-United Investment Advisors to Boston Advisors, transferring $1.2 billion in assets under management. The firm's securities research division, which was the nation's oldest provider of independent stock-charting information, was sold in 2004, as the final prelude to Babson-United's reorganization as a family holding company.

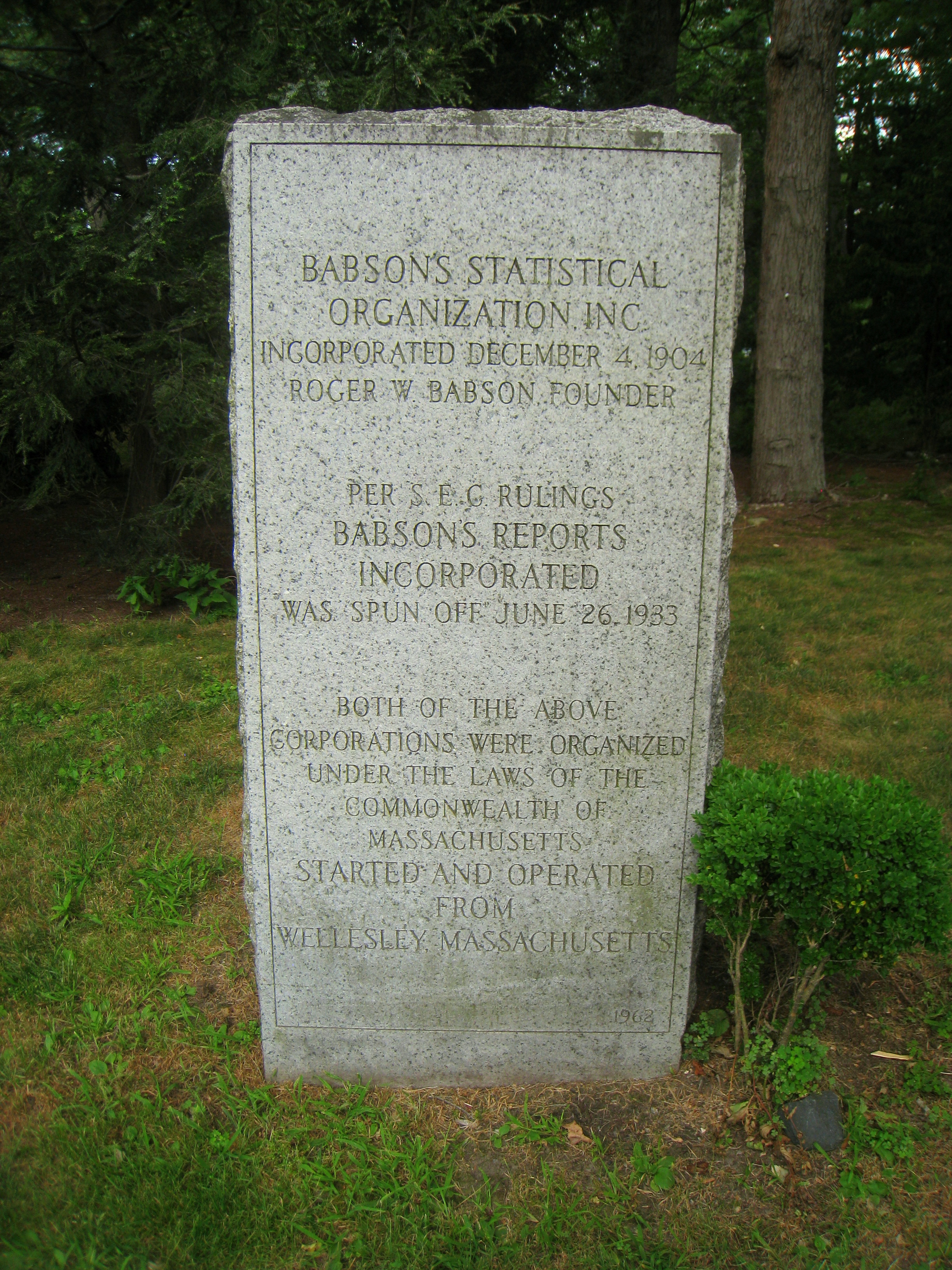
Monument to Babson's Statistical Organization at Babson College

In 1927, the company, then named Babson's Statistical Organization, established radio station WBSO in Wellesley Hills, Massachusetts. This station eventually developed into WROL, currently broadcasting in the Boston area.

As of May 2007, the firm's chairman and president is Richard L. Babson.
