= Roger Babson =

American entrepreneur and business theorist (1875–1967)

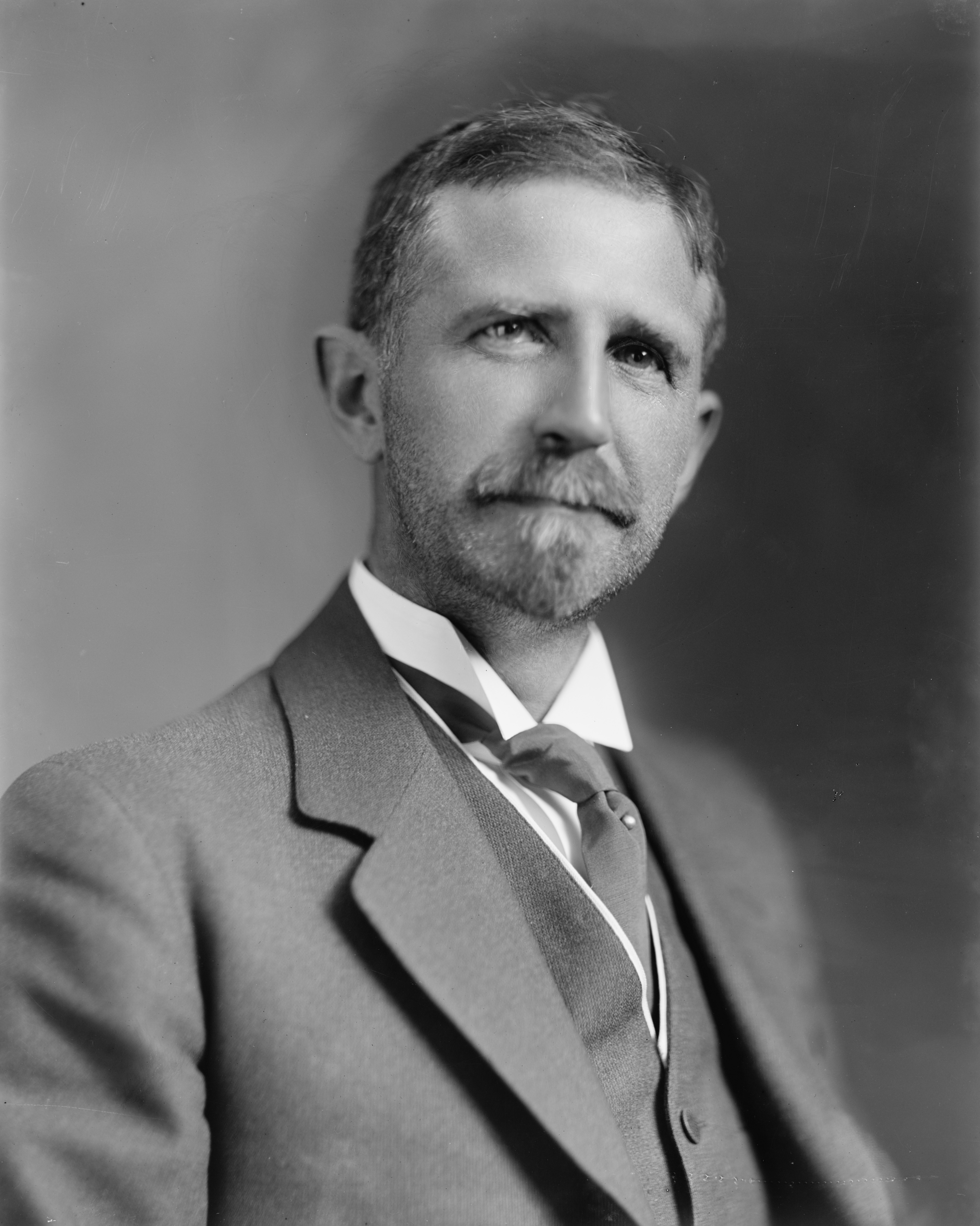
- Babson in 1918
- Born: July 6, 1875; Gloucester, Massachusetts, U.S.
- Died: March 5, 1967 (aged 91); Lake Wales, Florida, U.S.
- Education: Massachusetts Institute of Technology (BS) (1898)
- Occupations: Entrepreneur, businessman, economist, writer, philanthropist
- Known for: Business forecasting, founding of universities, predicting Wall Street Crash of 1929
- Political party: Prohibition Party
- Spouses: Grace Margaret Knight (m. 1900; died 1956) Nona M. Dougherty (m. 1957; died 1963)
- Children: 1

Roger Ward Babson (July 6, 1875 – March 5, 1967) was an American entrepreneur, Georgist economist, and business theorist in the first half of the 20th century. He is best remembered for predicting the Wall Street crash of 1929 and founding Babson College. He also founded Webber College (Webber International University) in Babson Park, Florida, and the defunct Utopia College, in Eureka, Kansas.

Roger attended the Massachusetts Institute of Technology and worked for investment firms before founding Babson's Statistical Organization (1904), which analyzed stocks and business reports; it continues as Babson-United, Inc.

== Early life ==
Babson was born to Nathaniel Babson and his wife Ellen Stearns as part of the 10th generation of Babsons to live in Gloucester, Massachusetts. Roger attended Massachusetts Institute of Technology and graduated in 1898 with a degree in engineering. As a college student, he lobbied the dean to include a business course, which resulted in a course known as "Business Engineering." Eventually, the business engineering program was expanded, and it is now seen as the forerunner of the MBA degree.

== Babson Statistical Organization ==
Upon graduation in 1898, Babson worked for investment firms selling bonds. In 1904, Roger and his wife Grace founded the Babson Statistical Organization (BSO) at their home in Wellesley, Massachusetts, with eight clients in its first year. At that time, the modern economic forecasting industry in the United States began to take form. Entrepreneurs (rather than academic economists) such as Babson, John Moody, and James H. Brookmire, dominated the early generation of forecasting services. The industry grew rapidly in the 1920s, and by 1929, Babson's newsletter had 12,000 subscribers (about one third of US market), each paying around $100 per year. The BSO's clients included business managers, investors, and credit-granting institutions.

Initially, the BSO aimed to serve as a central clearinghouse for business data, and to provide investment advisories. Babson's early motivation came in the wake of the 1907 financial panic, after which he sought to "tell readers when to buy and when to sell; and what to buy and what to sell." That year, Babson launched the first weekly forecasting service in the United States, and constructed an index that measured what he called "general business activity". He called it the "Babsonchart". Although Babson's methods were crude by modern standards (he believed Newtonian physics applied to periods of prosperity and depression), they produced some of the first "at a glance" economic indicators.

The collapse of the U.S. stock market in 1929 (and ensuing Great Depression) triggered a crisis for the forecasting industry. Many forecasters such as Irving Fisher had failed to predict the crash or the duration of the downturn, undermining confidence in their models. Babson pivoted his business and marketing strategy, but the earlier aura of "scientific forecasting" was tarnished.

The Babson Statistical Organization has evolved over time and is now operated privately as Babson-United.

== Babson College ==
In the fall of 1908, Roger Babson met Sidney Linnekin, a young carpenter from Gloucester, Massachusetts, who impressed him with his diligence while working on Babson's garage in Wellesley Hills. Their acquaintance led to a collaboration when Linnekin expressed interest in studying economics and bond salesmanship. Babson created a correspondence course in bond-selling, the first of its kind in the United States, which Linnekin later helped market and expand into a broader program in business education.

This initiative grew into a significant educational enterprise offering courses in economics, finance, and distribution, with Linnekin eventually serving as sales manager. At that time, no endowed business schools existed in the United States. The London School of Economics, which he had visited while researching Newton's laws of motion and gravity, served as institutional inspiration. The combination of his collaboration with Linnekin and his experience at the LSE inspired the eventual founding of the Babson Institute.

On September 3, 1919, with an enrollment of twenty-seven students, the Babson Institute held its first classes in the former home of Roger and Grace Babson on Abbott Road in Wellesley Hills. The institute's curriculum focused on practical experience. Students observed manufacturing processes during field trips to area factories and businesses, and viewed industrial films on Saturday mornings.

In 1922, Babson purchased a 200-acre farm and began developing the campus of Babson College. Babson was actively involved with the institute until his death in 1967.

== Work on financial theory ==
Babson's success as an investor was based on unorthodox views of the operation of markets. According to his biographer John Mulkern, Babson attributed the business cycle "to Sir Isaac Newton's law of action and reaction... (with a) pseudoscientific notion that gravity can be used to explain movement in the stock markets." His market forecasting techniques are expounded in articles in Traders World Magazine and the Gravity Research Foundation he founded.

Babson authored more than 40 books on economic and social problems, the most widely read being Business Barometers (eight editions) and Business Barometers for Profits, Security, Income (10 editions). Babson also wrote hundreds of magazine articles and newspaper columns. He was a popular lecturer on business and financial trends.

Babson was an investor and sometimes director of many corporations, including some traded on the New York Stock Exchange. He established the investment advisory company Babson's Reports, which published one of the first investment newsletters in the U.S.

=== Babson's Ten Commandments of Investing ===
Babson had "Ten Commandments" he followed in investing and encouraged his readers to do the same. These were:

1. Keep speculation and investments separate.
2. Don't be fooled by a name.
3. Be wary of new promotions.
4. Give due consideration to market ability.
5. Don't buy without proper facts.
6. Safeguard purchases through diversification.
7. Don't try to diversify by buying different securities of the same company.
8. Small companies should be carefully scrutinized.
9. Buy adequate security, not super abundance.
10. Choose your dealer and buy outright (don't buy on margin).

=== Forecast of Wall Street Crash ===
On September 5, 1929, Babson gave a speech to the National Business Conference at Babson College, in which he proclaimed, "More people are borrowing and speculating today than ever in our history. Sooner or later a crash is coming, and it may be terrific". Speaking at a time when expectations of a continuing boom economy were high, Babson's prescient advice was "wise are those investors who now get out of debt and reef their sails. This does not mean selling all you have, but it does mean paying up your loans and avoiding margin speculation".

Later that day, the stock market declined by about 3%. This became known as the "Babson Break." The Wall Street Crash of 1929 and the Great Depression soon followed.

=== Role in development of Andrews Pitchfork ===
Babson learned to draw a nominal line through zigzagging market action on charts from George F. Swain, a professor of engineering, when he worked with him, and he later taught this technique to Alan H. Andrews, who further refined it into "Andrews Pitchfork," a now-commonly used trendline indicator.

== Political career ==
Babson was the Prohibition Party's candidate for President of the United States in 1940. The election was won by incumbent President Franklin Delano Roosevelt of the Democratic Party. Babson was surpassed by two other unsuccessful candidates:

- Wendell Lewis Willkie of the Republican Party
- Norman Mattoon Thomas of the Socialist Party of America

== Role in development of the parking meter ==
In the late 1920s, Babson filed several patents for a parking meter. The meters required power from the battery of the parked vehicle to operate. In 1932, Carl Magee began work on a parking meter, which first saw service in July 1935, earning him recognition as the inventor of the parking meter.

== Establishment of the Gravity Research Foundation ==
Babson founded the Gravity Research Foundation in 1948. The Foundation established a research facility in the town of New Boston, New Hampshire, after Babson determined that this location was far enough away from the city of Boston, Massachusetts to survive a nuclear attack.

== Interest in Isaac Newton ==
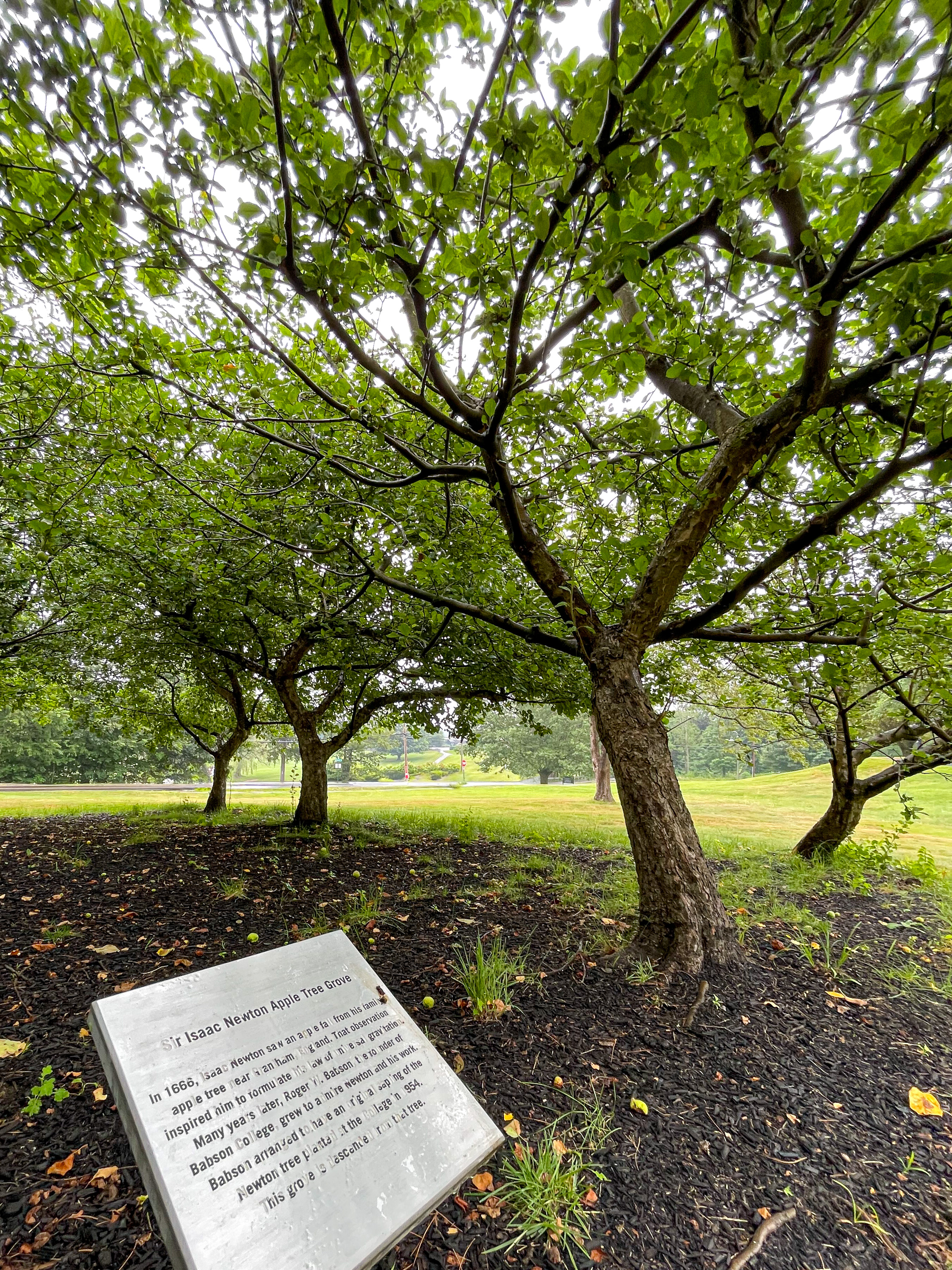
Isaac Newton's apple tree grove at Babson College in 2025

Throughout Babson's life, he had a strong interest in Isaac Newton, especially after learning how "Newton had combined the practical with the theoretical," similar to how Babson applied Newton's third law to finance. Babson's wife, Grace Babson, also had a strong interest in Newton, collecting much of Newton's work in a variety of translations, editions, and commentaries over many years. At the time, it was much easier to amass a large collection of scientific writing as book collectors valued them much less than in later years. Following some financial success, Grace was able to pursue her collection even further, later amounting to over 1,000 editions of Newton materials, being the largest source in the United States. In 1995, the Babson College collection was placed on loan to MIT's Burndy Library, and in 2006, to the Huntington Library in San Marino, California, where it is available for scholarly research.

Between Sir Isaac Newton Library (now known as Tomasso Hall) and the Lunder Admission Center stand descendants of the original apple trees that had purportedly inspired Newton's idea of gravity. Grace also saved the parlor of Newton's last residence before its demolition and created a replica in Babson Park.

== The "Babson Boulders" of Dogtown, Massachusetts ==
An example of a "Babson Boulder" at Dogtown

Babson was interested in the history of an abandoned settlement in Gloucester known as Dogtown. To provide charitable assistance to unemployed stonecutters in Gloucester during the Great Depression, Babson commissioned them to carve inspirational inscriptions on approximately two dozen boulders in the area surrounding Dogtown Common. The Babson Boulder Trail exists today as a well-known hiking and mountain-biking trail. The inscriptions are clearly visible. The boulders are scattered, not all are on the trail, and not all of the inscriptions face it, making finding them something of a challenge. Samples of some of the two dozen inscriptions include "Help Mother," "Spiritual Power," "Get A Job," "Keep Out Of Debt," and "Loyalty."

== Personal life ==
On March 29, 1900, Babson married his first wife, Grace Margaret Knight, who died in 1956. In 1957, he married Nona M. Dougherty, who died in 1963. Babson died in 1967.
