= Gur-e-Amir =

Mausoleum in Samarkand, Uzbekistan

Coordinates: 39°38′54″N 66°58′08″E

Gur-e Amir
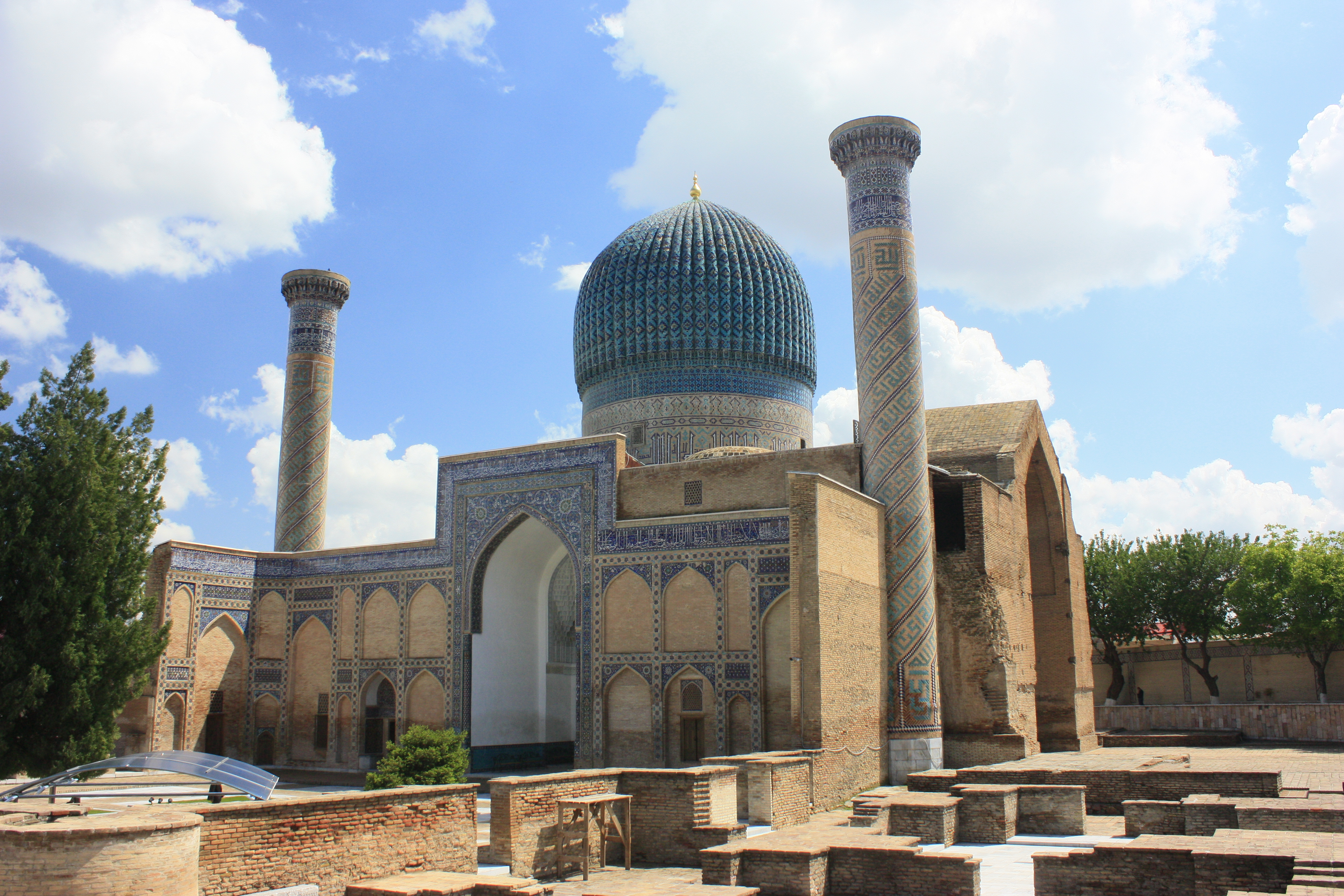
- Exterior view of the Gur-e Amir

Religion
- Affiliation: Sunni Islam

Location
- Location: Samarkand, Uzbekistan
- Country: Uzbekistan
- Interactive map of Gur-e Amir

Architecture
- Type: Mausoleum
- Style: Timurid
- Groundbreaking: 1403
- Completed: 1404

Specifications
- Dome height (outer): 30 m?
- Minaret: 2
- Minaret height: 30 m?

The Gur-e-Amir, also transcribed Gūr-i Amīr or Guri Amir (Uzbek: Amir Temur maqbarasi, Goʻri Amir, Persian: گورِ امیر) is a mausoleum of the Turco-Mongol conqueror Timur (also known as Tamerlane) in Samarkand, Uzbekistan. It occupies an important place in the history of architecture of Turkestan as the precursor for and having influence on the later Mughal tombs, including the Bagh-e-Babur in Kabul, Humayun's Tomb in Delhi and the Taj Mahal in Agra, built by Timur's descendants, the Mughals, that shaped Indian culture with Central Asian influences. The mausoleum has been heavily restored over the course of its existence.

== Background ==
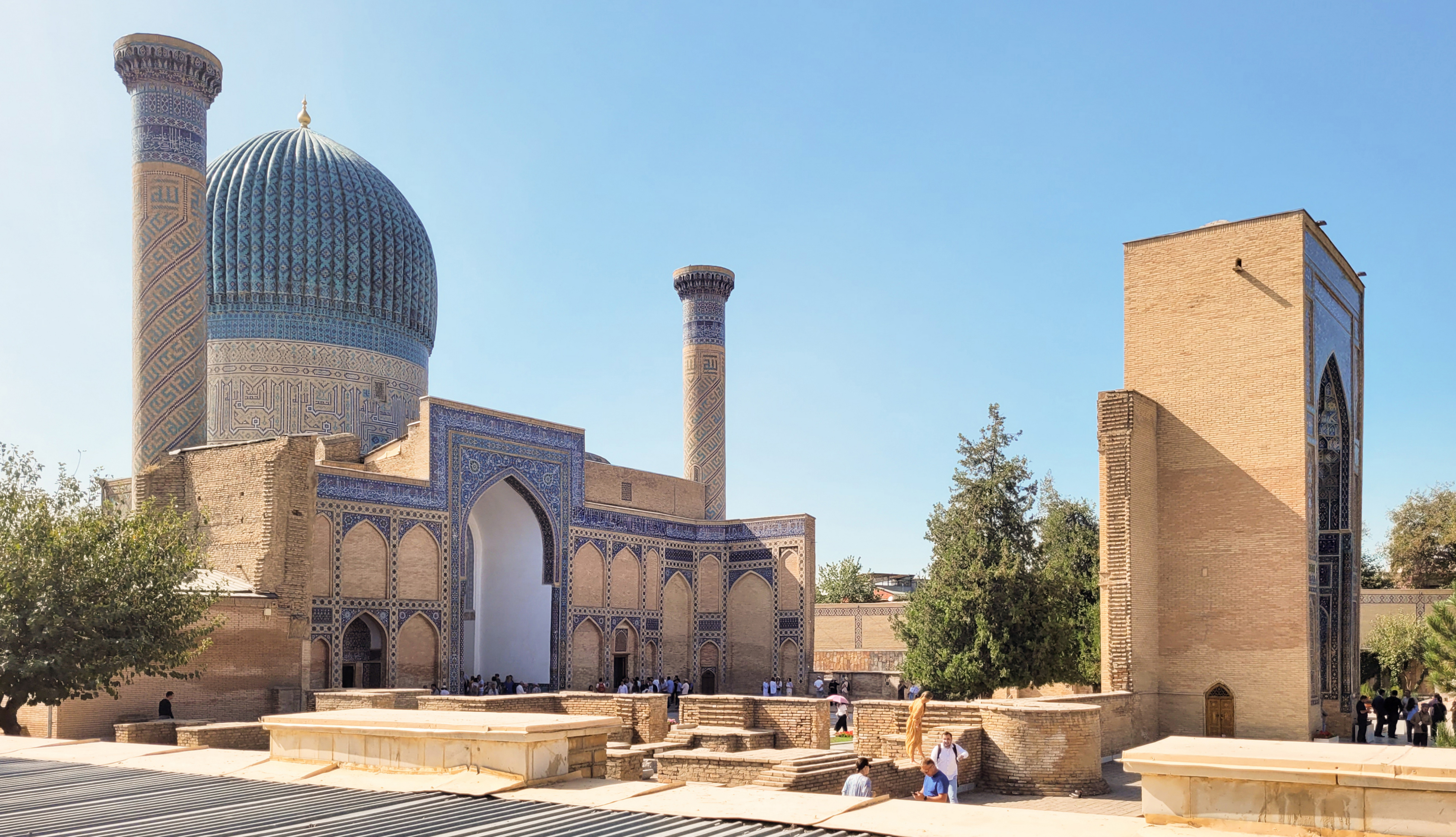
Geometric courtyard surrounding the tomb showing the gate, Iwan, and dome.

Gur-e Amir means "Tomb of the King" in Persian. This architectural complex with its azure dome contains the tombs of Timur, his sons Shah Rukh and Miran Shah and grandsons Ulugh Beg and Muhammad Sultan. Also honoured with a place in the tomb is Timur's teacher Sayyid Baraka.

The earliest part of the complex was built at the end of the 14th century by the orders of Muhammad Sultan. Now, only the foundations of the madrasah and khanqah, the entrance portal, and a part of one of four minarets remains.

The construction of the mausoleum began in 1403 after the sudden death of Muhammad Sultan, Timur's heir apparent and his beloved grandson, for whom it was intended. Timur had built for himself a smaller tomb in Shahrisabz near his Ak-Saray Palace. However, when Timur died in 1405 on campaign on his military expedition to China, the passes to Shahrisabz were snowed in, and so he was buried here instead. Ulugh Beg, another grandson of Timur, completed the work. During his reign the mausoleum became the family crypt of the Timurid dynasty.

== Architecture ==
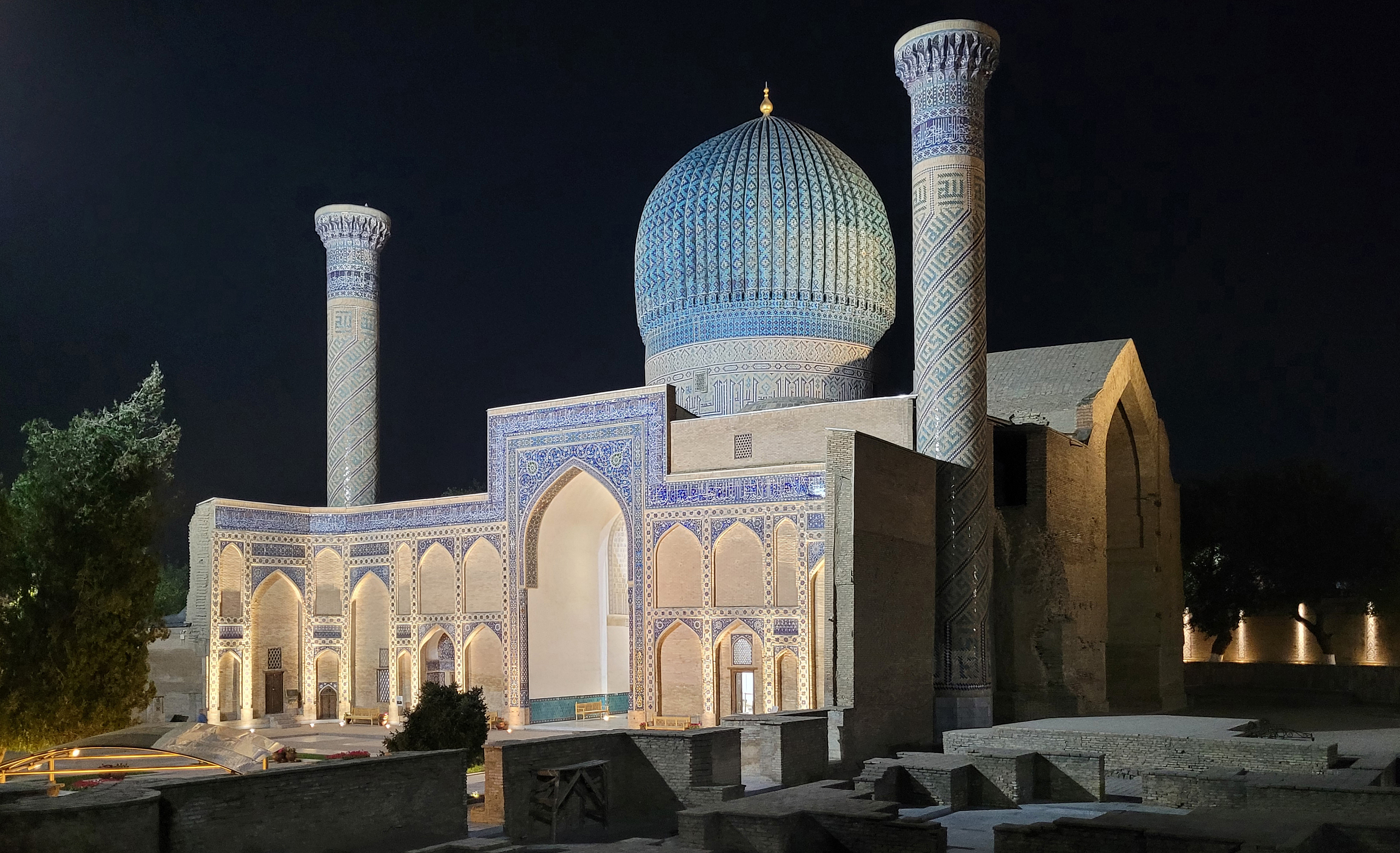
Gur-e-Amir at night

The entrance portal to the Muhammad Sultan ensemble is richly decorated with carved bricks and various mosaics. All the extensions of Ulugh Beg's time are attributed to the architect Muhammad ibn Mahmud from Isfahan.

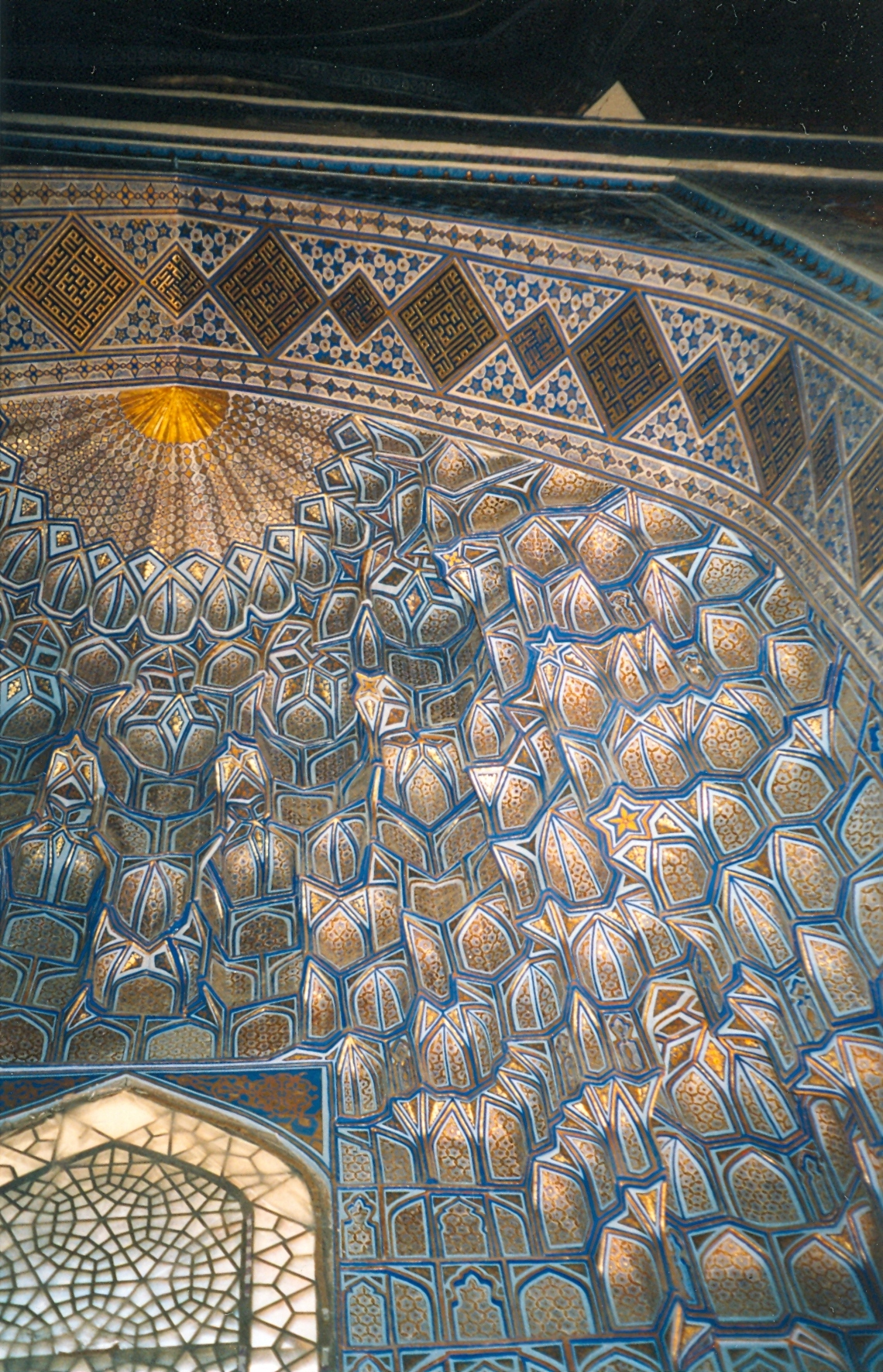
Inside the mausoleum – deep niches and diverse muqarnas decoration.

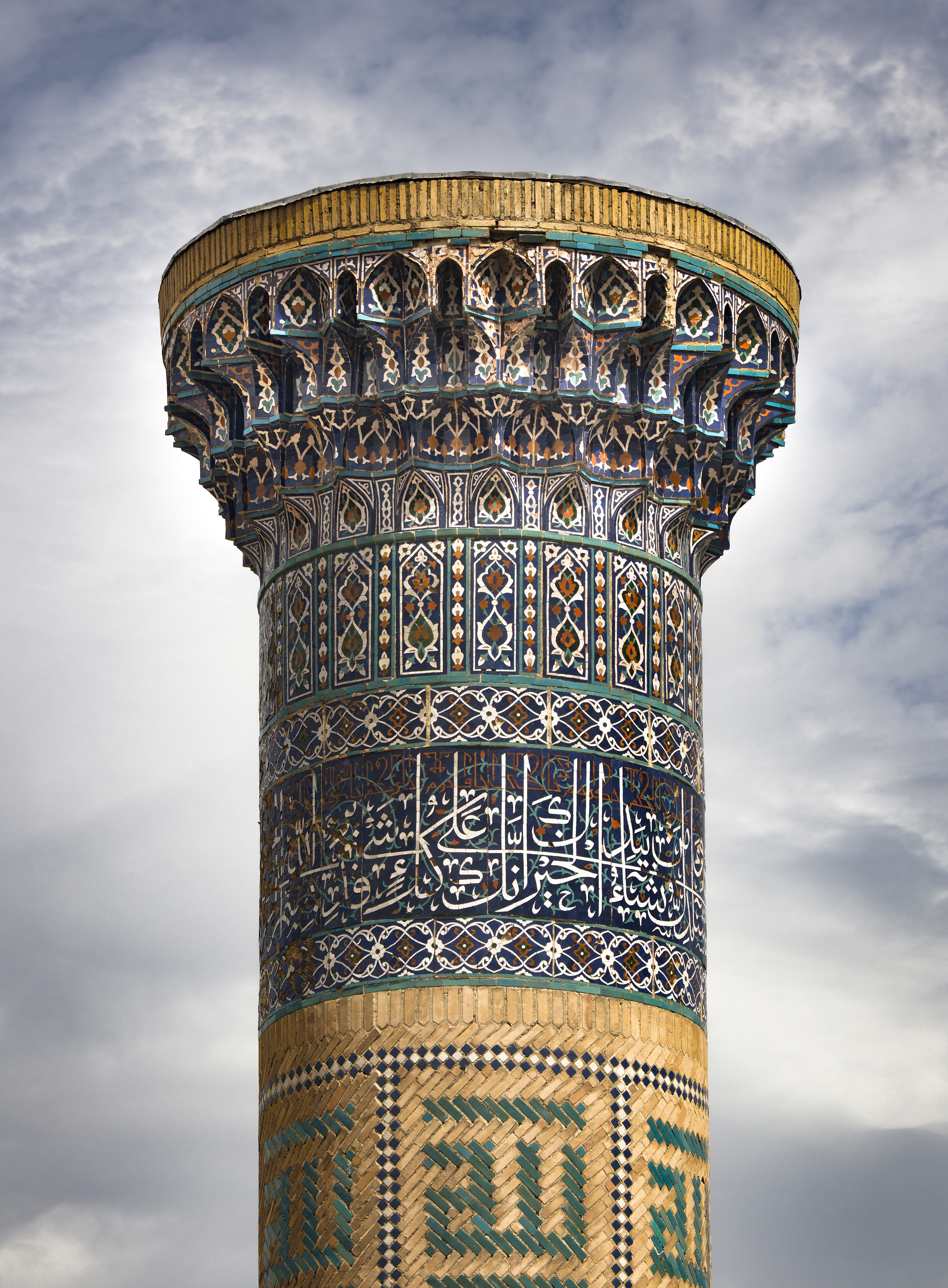
The western minaret, one of two surviving out of the original four, showcases Timurid-style architecture. Both minarets flank the entrance portal and are independent of the main structure (mausoleum), serving to emphasize the grand scale and importance of the complex.

Outwardly, the Gur-e Amir Mausoleum is a one-cupola building. It is famous for its simplicity of construction and for its solemn monumentality of appearance. It is an octahedral building crowned by an azure fluted dome. The exterior decoration of the walls consists of the blue, light-blue and white tiles organized into geometrical and epigraphic ornaments against a background of terracotta bricks. The dome (diameter – 15 m (49.21 ft), height – 12.5 m (41.01 ft)) is of a bright blue color with deep rosettes and white spots. Heavy ribbed fluting gives an amazing expressiveness to the cupola.

During the reign of Ulugh Beg a doorway was made to provide an entrance into the mausoleum.

Inwardly, the mausoleum appears as a large, high chamber with deep niches at the sides and diverse decoration. The lower part of the walls covered are by onyx slabs composed as one panel. Each of these slabs is decorated with refined paintings. Above the panel there is a marble stalactite cornice. Large expanses of the walls are decorated with painted plaster; the arches and the internal dome are ornamented by high-relief papier-mâché cartouches, gilded and painted.

The ornate carved headstones in the inner room of the mausoleum merely indicate the location of the actual tombs in a crypt directly underneath the main chamber. Under Ulugh Beg's government a solid block of dark green jade was placed over the grave of Tamerlane. Formerly this stone had been used at a place of worship in the Chinese emperor's palace, then as the throne of Duwa (a descendant of Genghis Khan) in Chagatay Khanate. Next to Tamerlane's grave lie the marble tombstones of his sons Miran Shah and Shah Rukh and also of grandsons Muhammad Sultan and Ulugh Beg. Tamerlane's spiritual teacher Mir Said Baraka, also rests here.

== History ==
Erected on the initiative and at the expense of Timur in 1404, this masterpiece of craftsmanship from the Timurid period occupies an important place in the history of Islamic architecture. The main architect of the mausoleum was Muhammad ibn Mahmud Isfahani, a native of the Iranian city of Isfahan.

=== Construction ===
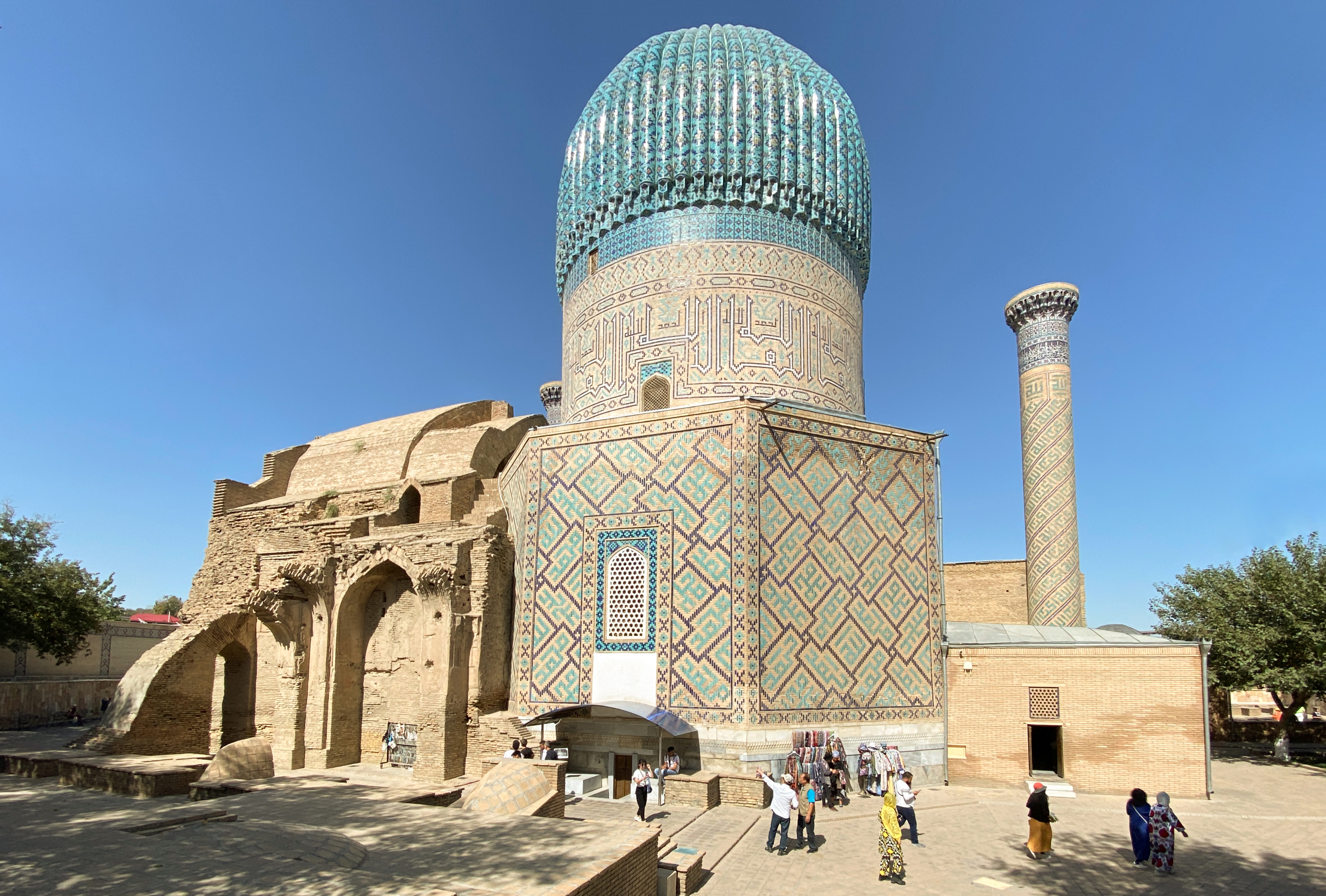
Back side of the Gur-e-Amir

In 1403, after a military campaign against the Ottoman Empire, Muhammad Sultan, Timur's heir to the throne, died. Returning to Samarkand in the fall of 1404, Timur ordered for him the construction of a mausoleum, which became the family crypt of the Gur-e-Amir. The mausoleum was built in the southeastern part of medieval Samarkand, near the madrasa and khanqah of Muhammad Sultan.

Timur died during a campaign in China. In January 1405, he arrived in the city of Otrar (its ruins are near the confluence of Arys into the Syr Darya), where he fell ill and died (18 February according to most historians, 15 February according to the tombstone of Timur). Timur's body was embalmed, placed in an ebony coffin upholstered in silver brocade, and contrary to the will of Timur, who willed to be buried in his native Shahrisabz, was taken to Samarkand on the initiative of his grandson Khalil-sultan. Tamerlane was buried in the Gur-e-Amir mausoleum, at that time still unfinished. The official mourning events were held on 18 March 1405 by Timur's grandson Khalil-Sultan (1405–1409), who seized the Samarkand throne against the will of his grandfather, who bequeathed the throne to his eldest grandson Pir Muhammad.

During Ulugh Beg's reign, the mausoleum became the Timurid family crypt; a doorway was made to provide an entrance to the mausoleum.

=== Later enlargement ===
In this architectural ensemble are the tombs of Timur himself, his sons Shah Rukh (died in 1447 in Herat) and Miran Shah (killed on April 21, 1408 in the vicinity of Tabriz), grandsons - Ulugh Beg (1394–1449) and Muhammad Sultan, also Timurids, and the teacher and mentor of Timur, Mir Said Baraka. By the will of Timur's youngest son Shah Rukh, Mir Said Baraka's remains are buried in the Gur-e-Amir. Timur was a Muslim and an admirer of Sufi orders. The main spiritual mentor of Timur was the descendant of the Islamic prophet Muhammad, Sheikh Mir Said Baraka. He was the one who gave Timur the symbols of power: a drum and a banner when he came to power in 1370. Mir Said Baraka predicted a great future for the Emir. He accompanied Timur on his great campaigns. In 1391 he blessed him before his battle with Tokhtamysh. In 1403 they together mourned the unexpected death of the heir to the throne - Muhammad-Sultan. According to the Arab historian Ibn Arabshah Timur constantly said: "All that I have reached in the state and the strongest countries conquered by me - all this was achieved because of the prayer and blessing of Sheikh Shamsuddin al-Khavoriyyah and all the luck found only from Said Baraka". Therefore, Timur himself was also buried at his feet.

=== Decline and restoration ===
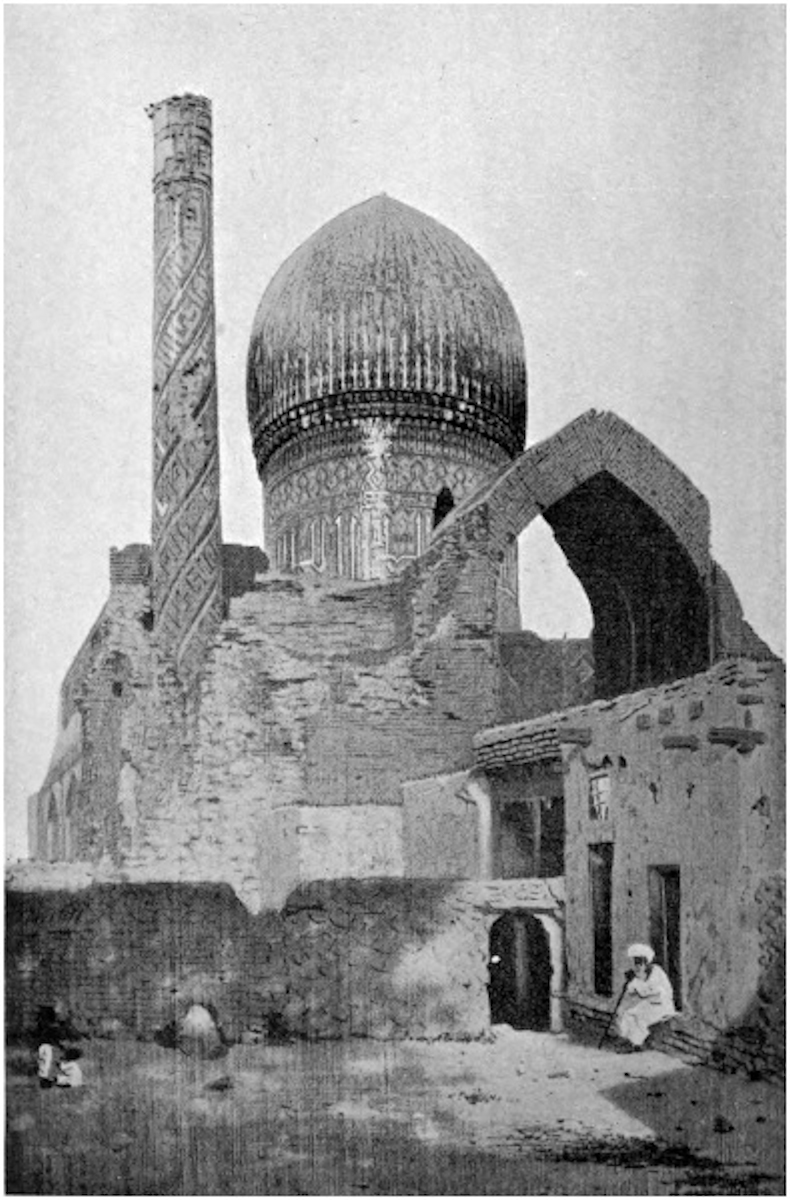
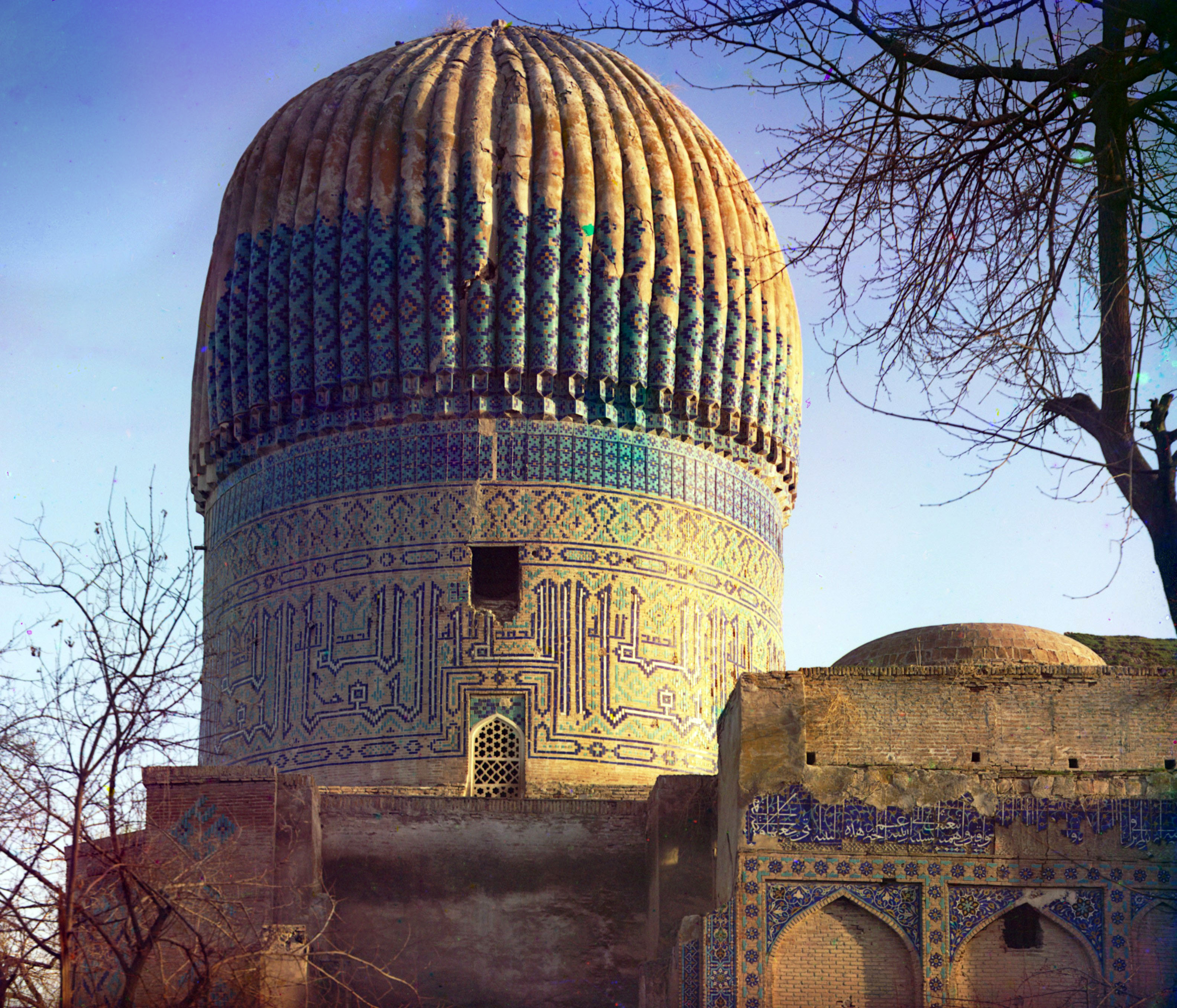
The tomb of Timur, as photographed in 1899, and c. 1910 by Sergey Prokudin-Gorsky

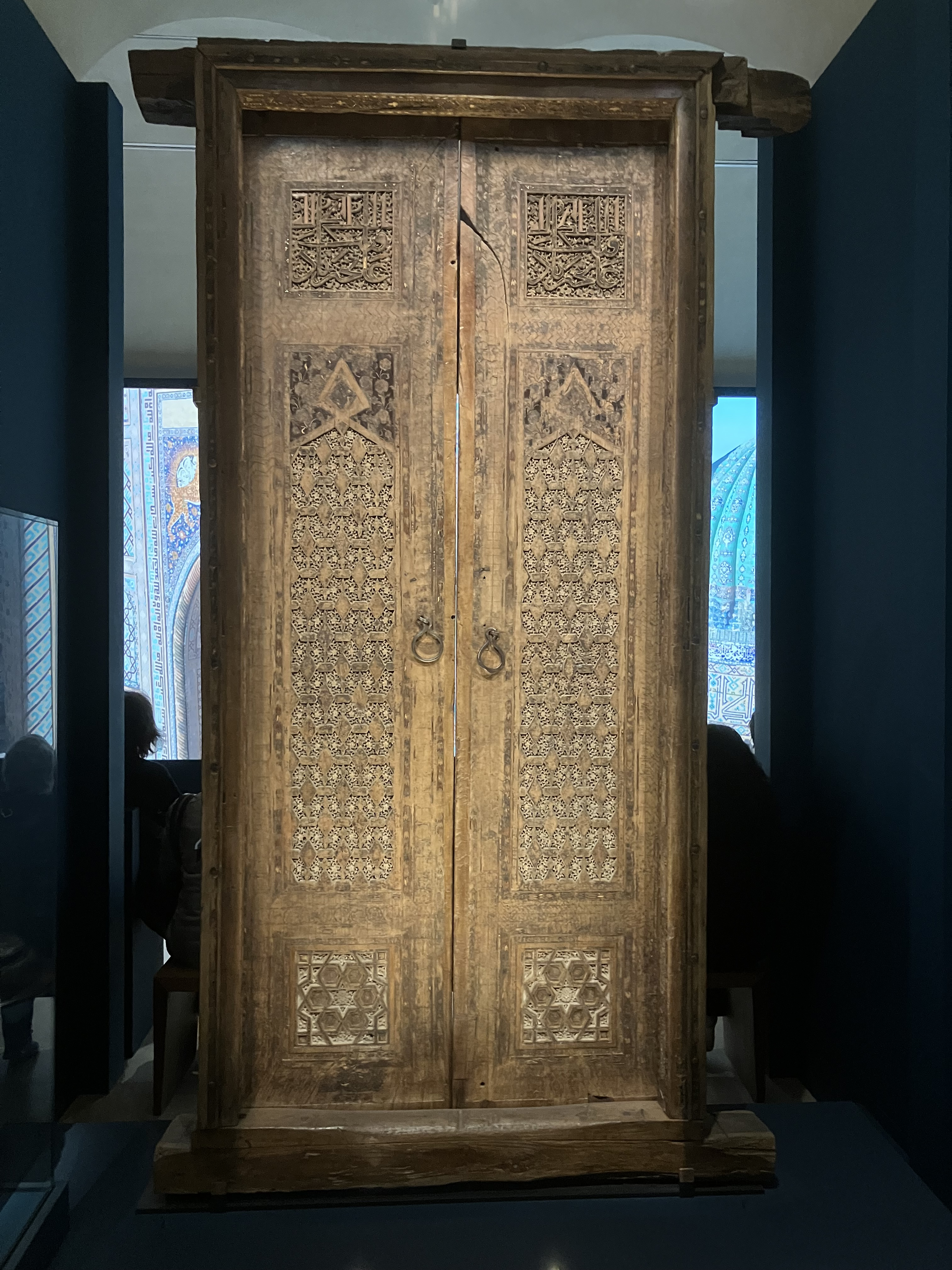
Wooden gate from the Gur-i Mir, with sculpted decoration, traces of polychromy and micro-mosaics (khatamkari). State Museum of History of Culture of Uzbekistan.

In 1740, king Nader Shah of the Afsharid Empire tried to carry away Timur's sarcophagus. Nader idolized Timur. He imitated Timur's military prowess and, later in his reign, Timur's cruelty, but in the process of removal the sarcophagus broke in two. This was interpreted as a bad omen. His advisers urged him to return the stone to its rightful place.

Unfortunately, after the end of 17th century Samarkand suffered a long period of decline. The city lost the status of capital to Bukhara. The great Silk Road bypassed the city and its great historical monuments stood empty and forgotten. Only after the Second World War did extensive restoration work in the Gur-e-Amir begin.

Timur's tomb was opened shortly before the German invasion of the Soviet Union on 19 June 1941. The exhumation of Timur in 1941 was made under the direction of Soviet scientist and anthropologist Mikhail Mikhaylovich Gerasimov, who was able to reconstruct Timur's facial features from his skull, and it was also confirmed that he was 172 cm in height and would have walked with a pronounced limp.

In the 1950s the dome, main portal and minarets were refurbished. By that time the majolica tiles had mostly fallen away. In the 1970s, the restoration of the interior was undertaken. Neither the madrasah nor the khanqah of initial Muhammad Sultan's complex were reconstructed at that time. With the resurgence of the interest in Timur after the founding of the Republic of Uzbekistan in 1991, care of his places of worship has intensified.

=== Curse of Timur ===
When Soviet scientists wanted to open Timur's tomb, rumors went around Samarkand that opening the tomb would curse those who opened it. Local leaders attempted to warn the excavation team of the "risks".

The tomb is inscribed with two warnings that read "When I rise from the dead, the world shall tremble". Allegedly, once opened another inscription was discovered: “Whosoever disturbs my tomb will unleash an invader more terrible than I". Even though people close to Gerasimov claim that this story is a fabrication, the legend persists.

The tomb was opened by Mikhail Mikhaylovich Gerasimov, a Soviet archaeologist on 20 June 1941, two days before the Nazis invaded the Soviet Union.

Apparently, Stalin believed in the curse and ordered Timur be reburied. Tamerlane was reburied with full Islamic burial rites on 20 December 1942, about one month before the Soviet victory at Stalingrad (though by this time the German Army at Stalingrad was already encircled).

== Nearby monuments ==
Some consider the Gur-e Amir, Ruhabad mausoleum and Aksaray mausoleum to be a combined ensemble because of their closeness.

Ruhabad (14th century) is a small mausoleum and is said to contain a hair of Muhammad. The one-story madrasah now accommodates craftsmens' shops. There is a functioning mosque next door to the madrasah. All three combine into one ensemble.

The Aksaray mausoleum (15th century), recently restored, is located on a quiet street behind Gur-e Amir.

== See also ==
- Registan
- Bibi-Khanym Mosque
- Shah-i-Zinda
- Tourism in Uzbekistan
- Persian domes
- Timurid architecture

== Sources ==
- Gur Emir complex, Rukhobod, Aksaray mausoleums. Information, photos, location

== Photo gallery ==
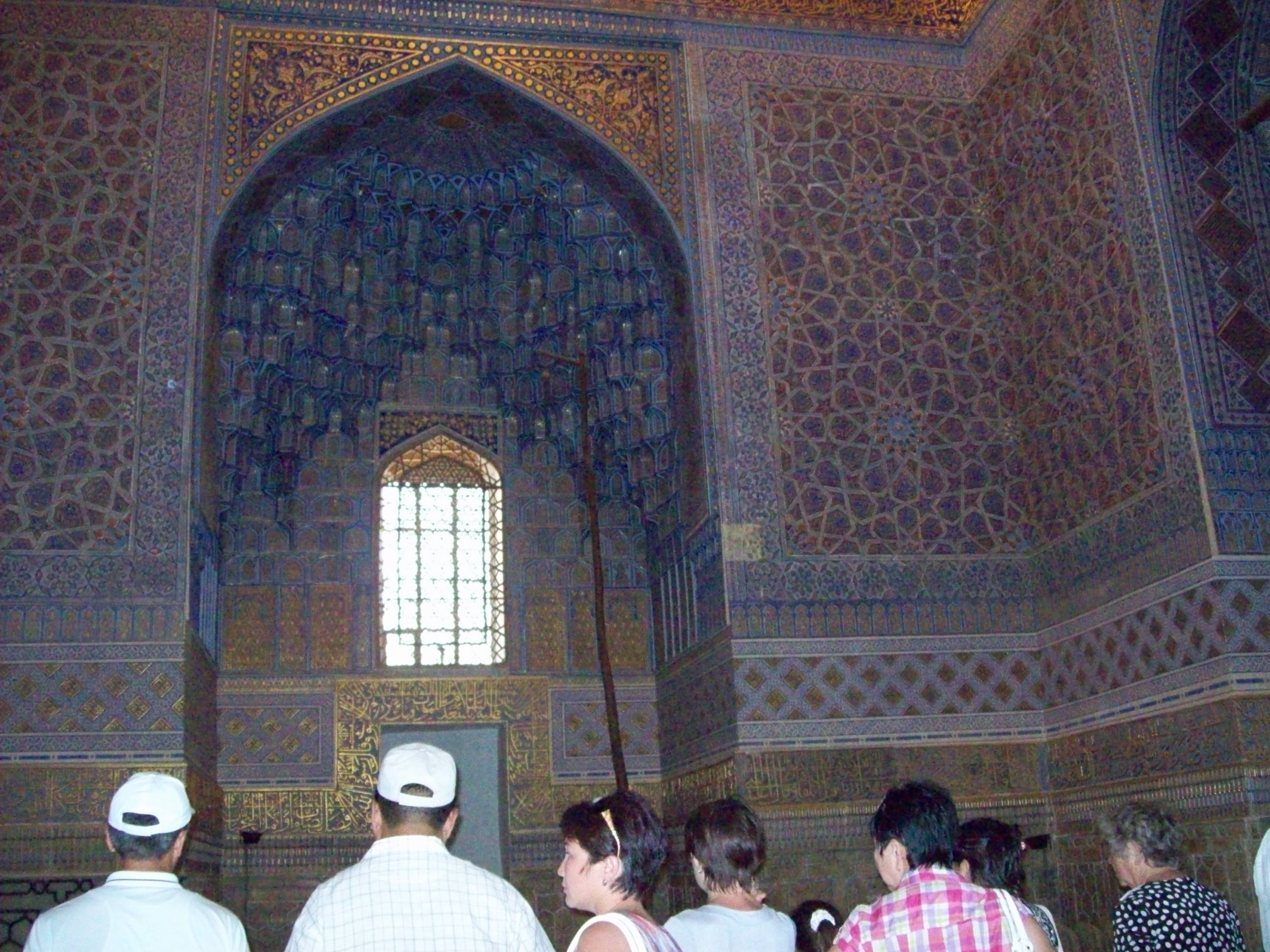

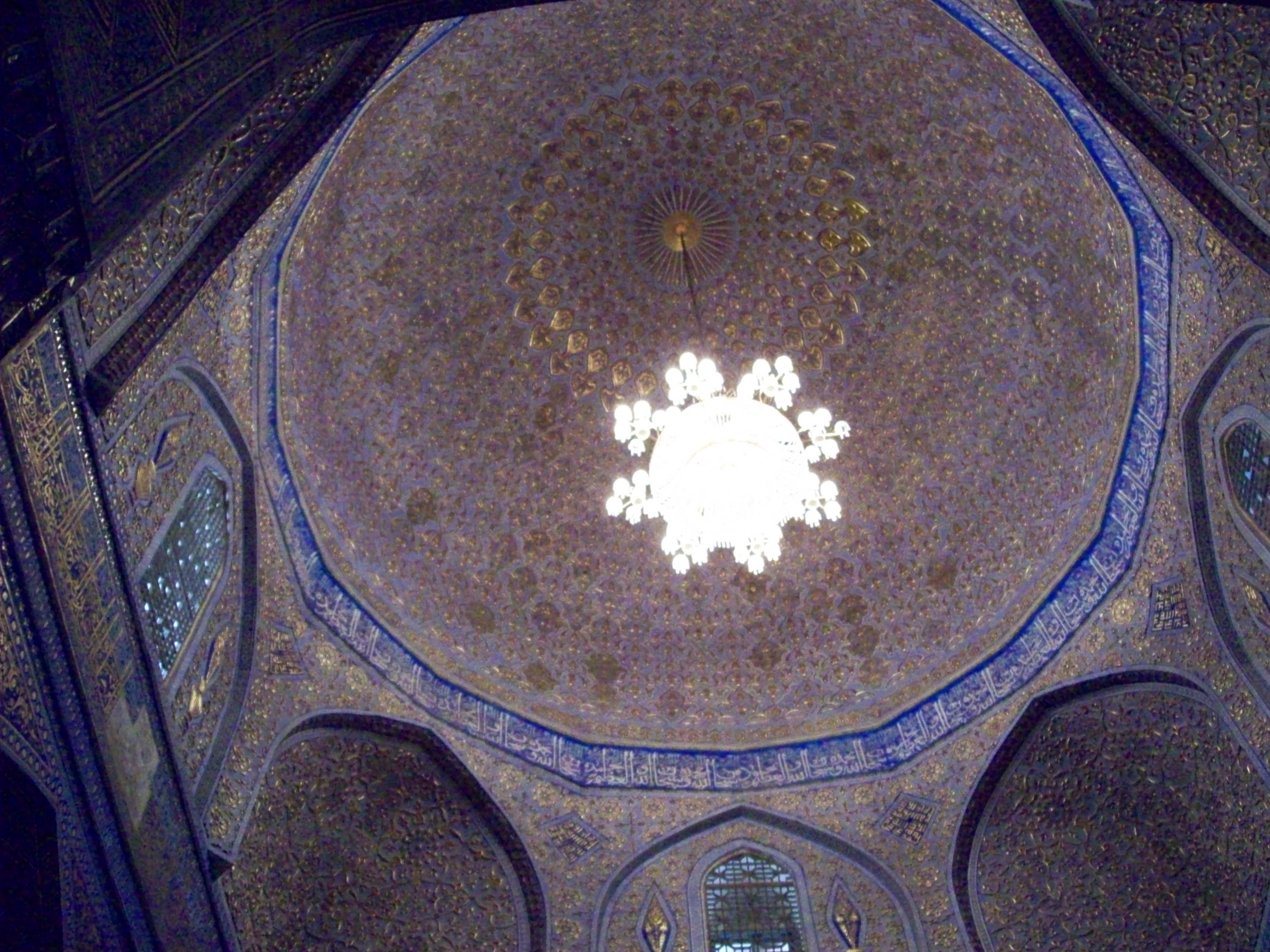

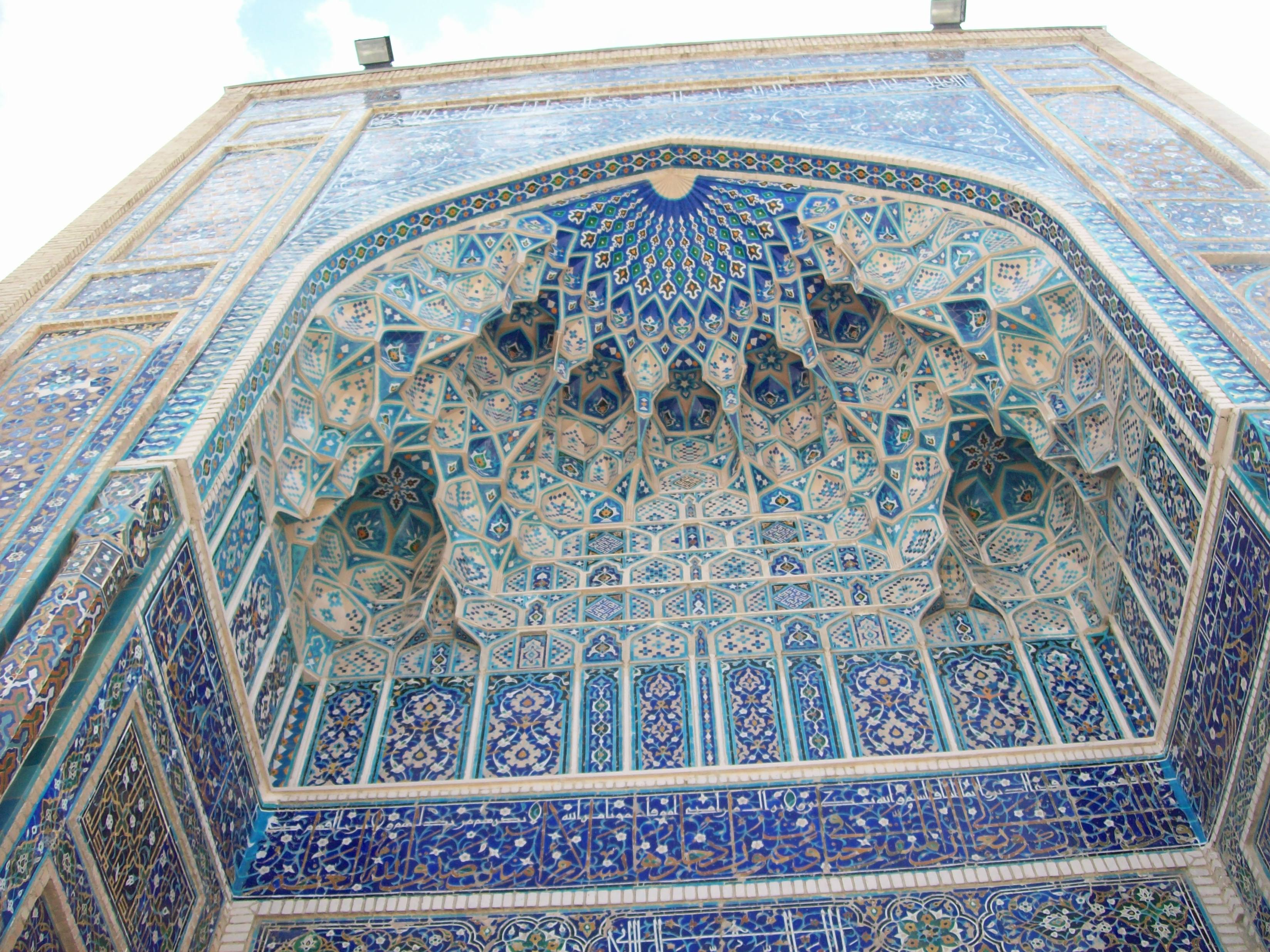

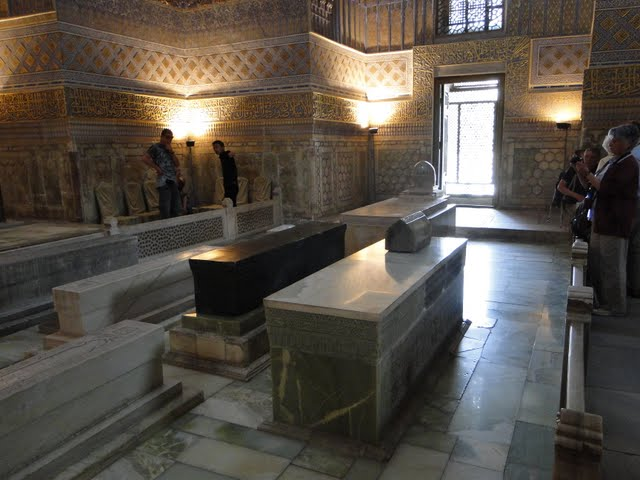

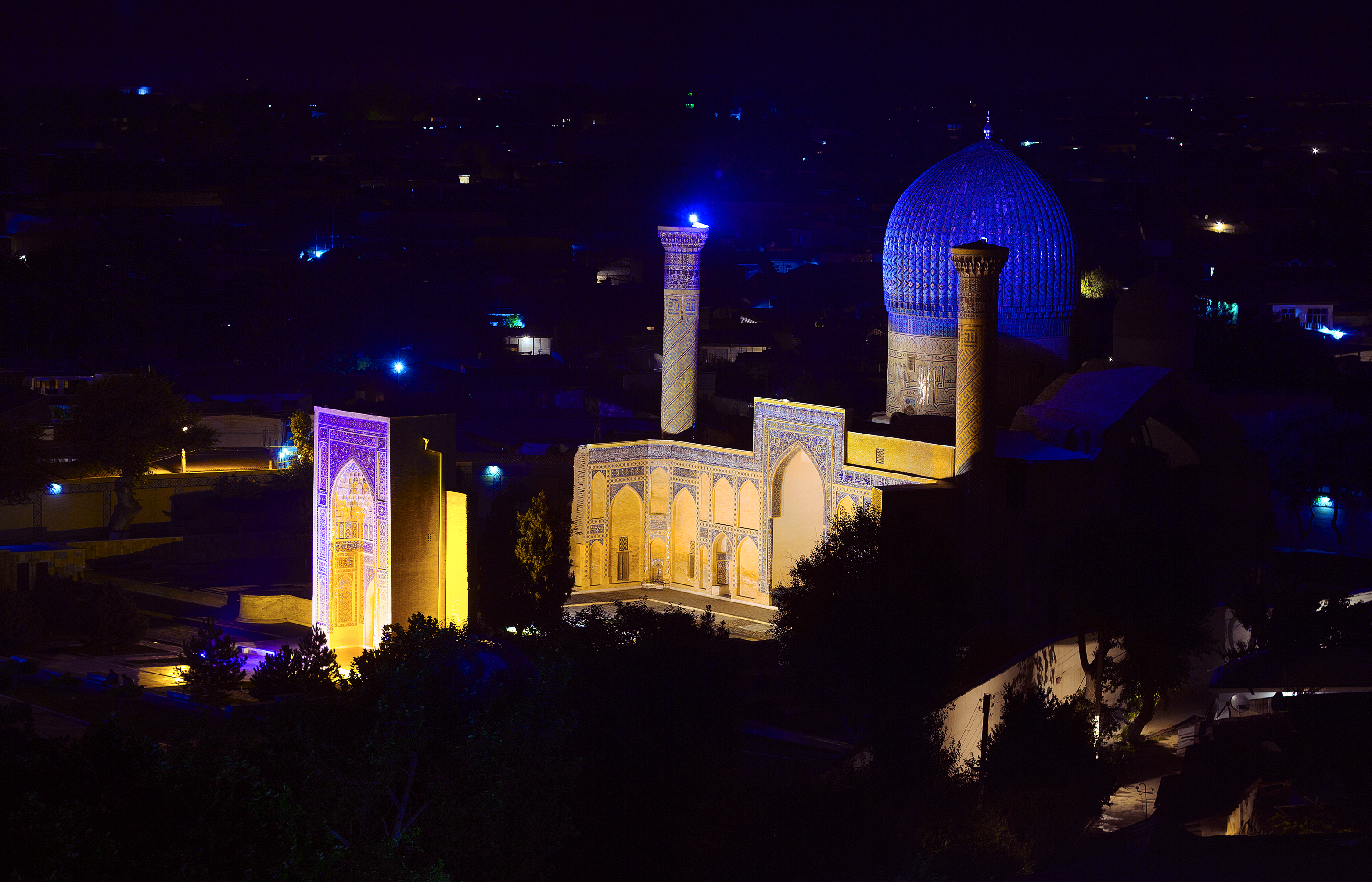
