= Chilek silver bowl =

Alchon Huns bowl from Samarkand

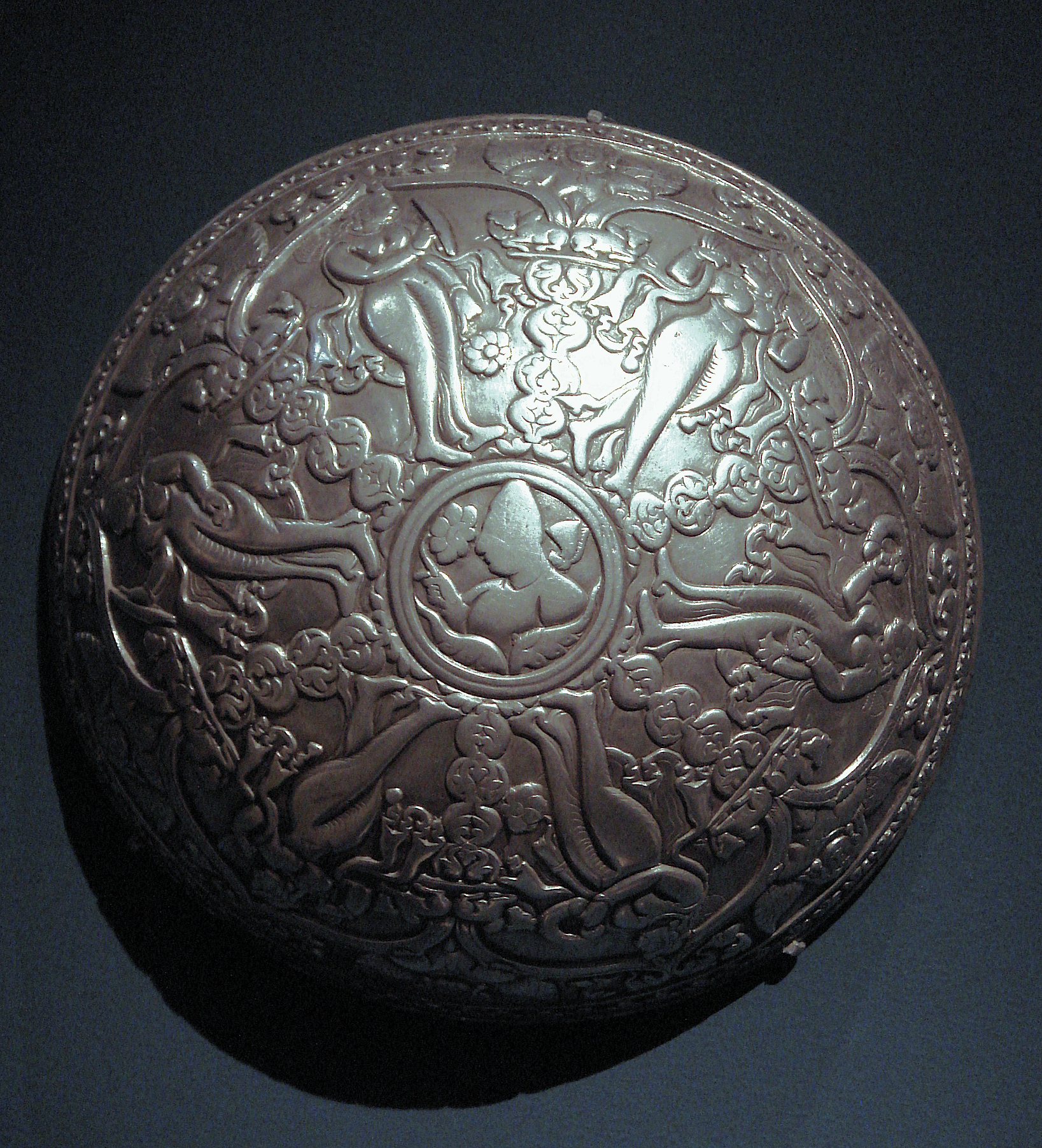
- The Chilek bowl, with an Alchon Hun ruler in the central medallion.
- Material: Bone
- Size: diameter 18.5 cm.
- Weight: 1003 grm
- Created: end of 5th century CE, early 6th century CE
- Place: Chilek, near Samarkand
- Present location: Samarkand Museum
- Culture: Alchon Huns

Location
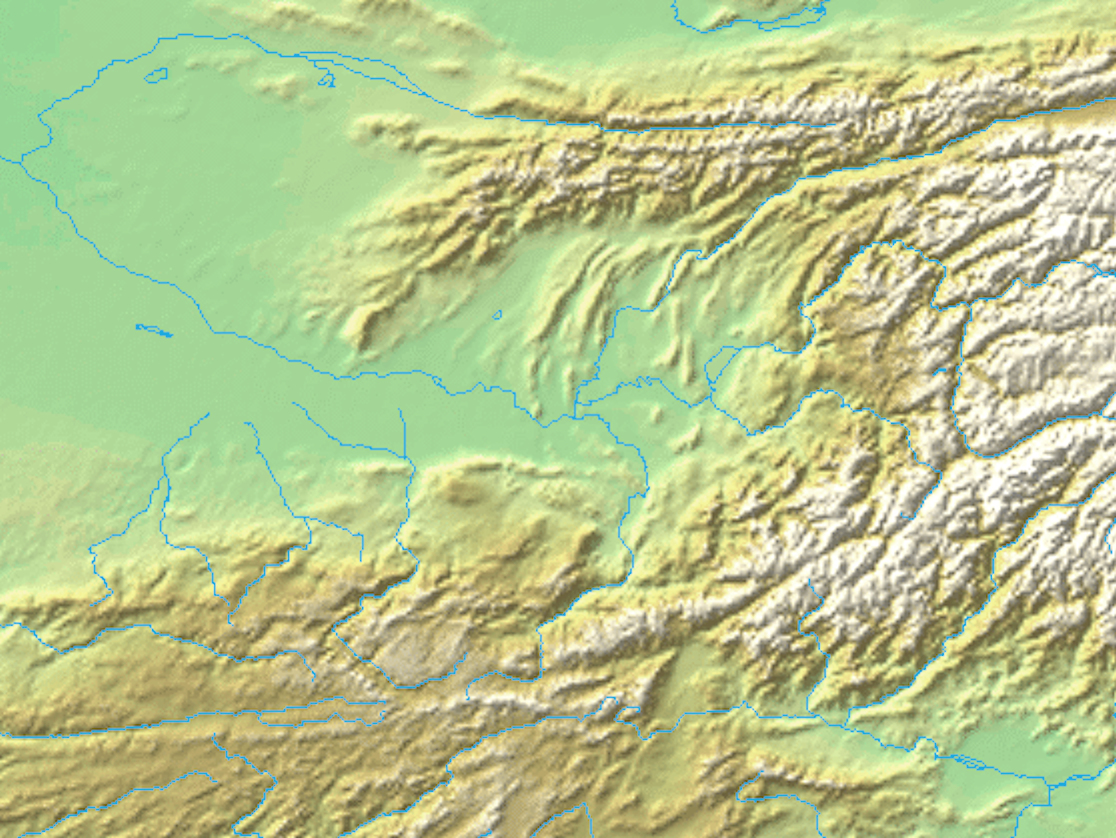

The Chilek silver bowl ("Čilek bowl") is a silver bowl found in the area of Samarkand, and considered as the "best known specimen of Hephthalite art". More specifically, the bowl seems to belong to the Alchon Huns, south of the Hindu-Kush, during the last third of the 5th century CE. The Alchons have long been considered as a part or a sub-division of the Hephthalites, or as their eastern branch, but now tend to be considered as a separate entity.

The bowl is similar in composition with the Hephthalite silver bowl, but represents "six dancers in Indian costume with Iranian ribbons and Hephthalite-short heads". It, too, is considered as an Alchon object, but possibly manufactured in India at the request of the Alchons. It is now in the Samarkand Museum.

The man in the medallion at the bottom of the Chilek bowl has a clearly elongated skull, characteristic of the Alchon Huns. He wears royal ribbons in the Sasanian style, and holds a flower in his right hand, as seen in the coinage of Mehama. The bowl should probably be dated to the time of Khingila (430/440-490 CE).

The general style of such silver bowls with outside decoration and without stem is derived from earlier Sasanian Empire prototypes, and ultimately from the Achaemenid Empire, and has been described as "post-Sasanian" or "sub-Sasanian".

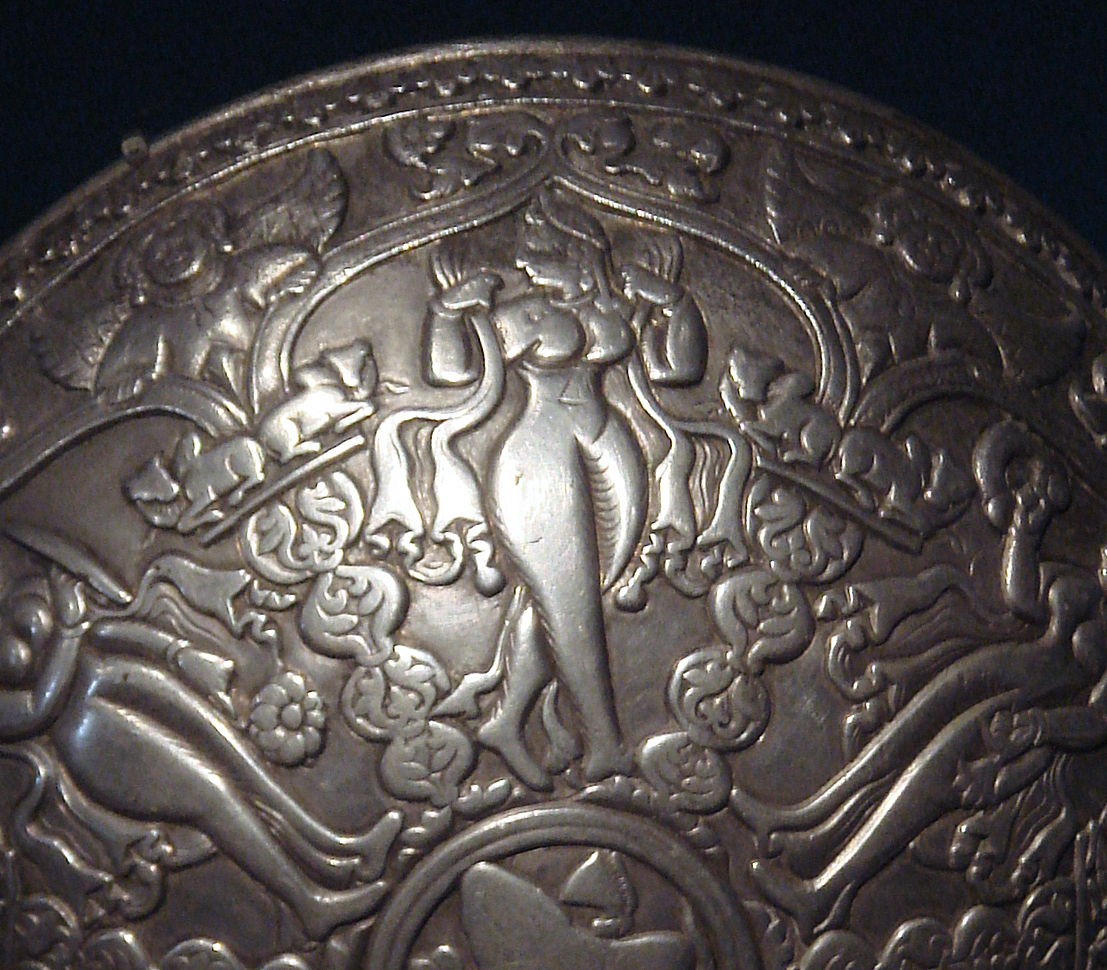
Detail of a dancer

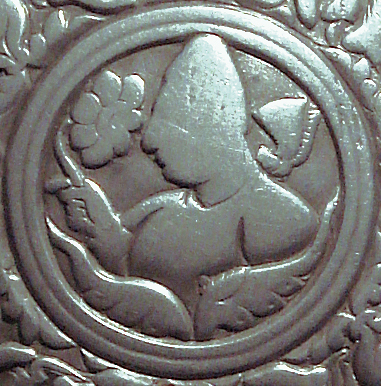
The Alchon ruler in the central medallion of the bowl

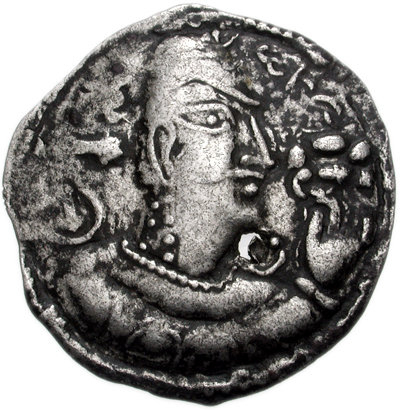
Khingila holding a flower, in his coinage
