= Khatam =

Ancient Persian inlaying technique

Detail of an Iranian jewel box decorated by khatam

Khātam (Persian: خاتم) is an ancient Persian technique of inlaying. It is a version of marquetry where art forms are made by decorating the surface of wooden articles with delicate pieces of wood, bone and metal precisely-cut intricate geometric patterns. Khatam-kari (خاتم‌کاری) or khatam-bandi (خاتم‌بندی) refers to the art of crafting a khatam. Common materials used in the construction of inlaid articles are gold, silver, brass, aluminum and twisted wire.

== Design and construction ==
Designing of inlaid articles is a highly elaborate process. There are sometimes more than 400 pieces per square inch in a work of average quality. Thin rods of different coloured woods, ivory, bone, brass, silver, etc. were glued together into long bunches that could have a round, rectangular, or polygonal cross-section. The bunches were cut into thin slices and combined with others to create intricate patterns. In each cubic centimetre up to approximately 250 individual pieces can end up side by side, smoothed, oiled and polished. Inlaid articles in the Safavid era took on a special significance as artists created their precious artworks. Woods used include betel, walnut, cypress and pine. These works include doors and windows, mirror frames, Quran boxes, inlaid boxes, pen and penholders, lanterns and shrines.

== Examples ==
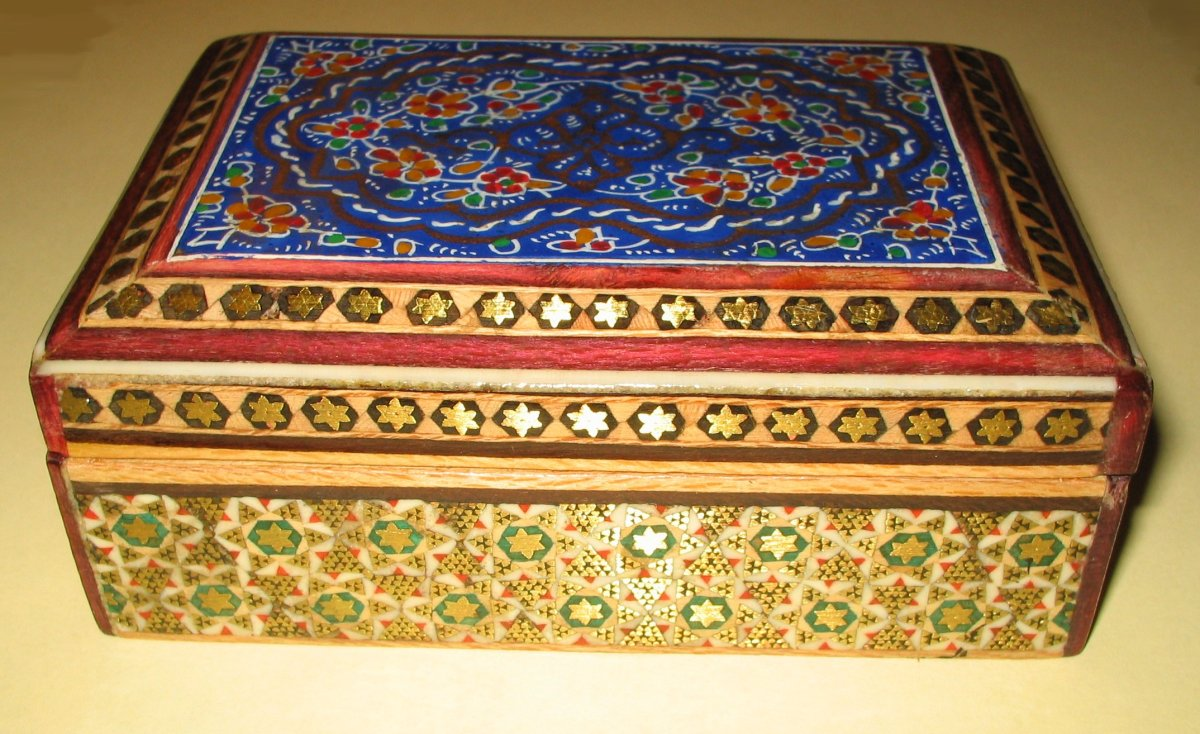
A simple Khatam marquetry box decorated with geometric patterns of triangles and 6-point stars on its sides, and a floral design on its lid

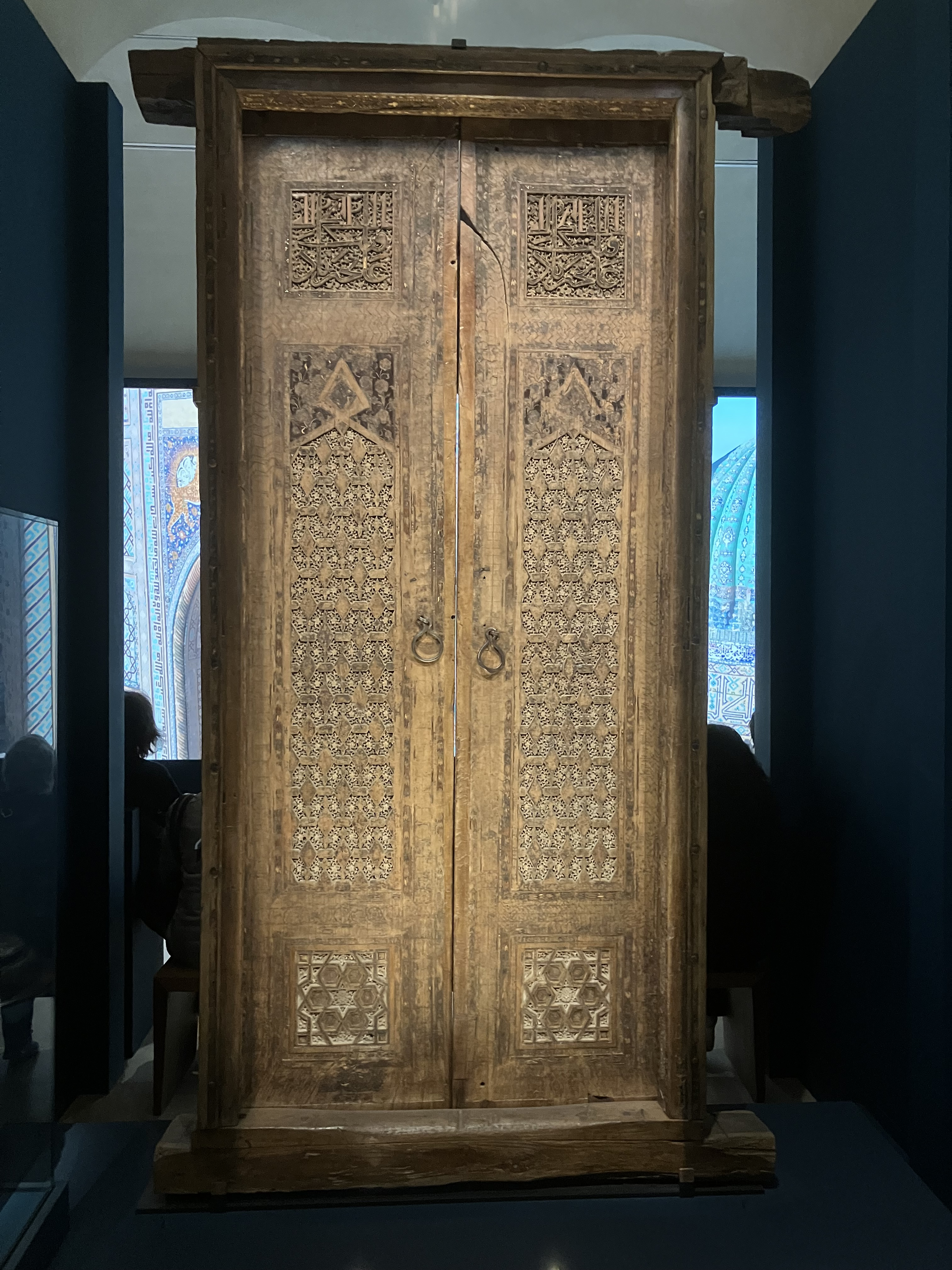
Wooden gate from Gur-e-Amir, with sculpted decoration, traces of polychromy and micro-mosaics (khatamkari). 15th century. State Museum of History of Culture of Uzbekistan

The ornamentation of the doors of holy places predominantly consists of inlaid motifs. Samples of these can be observed in the cities of Mashhad, Qom, Shiraz and Rey. In the Safavid era, the art of marquetry flourished in the southern cities of Iran, especially in Shiraz, Isfahan and Kerman. The inlaid-ornamented rooms at the Sa'dabad Palace and the Marble Palace in Tehran are among masterpieces of this art.

== Current status ==
Khatam is mainly practiced in Shiraz, Isfahan, and Tehran. The art of inlaid woodwork is undertaken in the workshops of the Cultural Heritage Organization of Iran, as well as in private workshops.

Master Mohammad Bagher Hakim-Elahi (Persian: محمدباقر حکیم‌الٰهی) was a master of this art, and learned the techniques from Master Sanee Khatam in Shiraz. Later in life, in the early 1950s, he moved to Tehran, where he lived until the end of his life in March 2012. He continued making Khatam master pieces, ranging from small frames, and jewelry boxes, to large items such as coffee tables, bed frames, dinner tables, and large chandeliers, some of which are currently in museums in Iran, but most are in private collections all around the world, including southern California. He also taught the art to his younger brother Asadollah Hakim-Elahi (اسدالله حکیم‌الٰهی). Asadollah died from lymphoma in the late 1970s when he was in his mid 40s.

== See also ==
- Iranian handicrafts
