= State Museum of Cultural History of Uzbekistan =

Museum in Samarkand, Uzbekistan

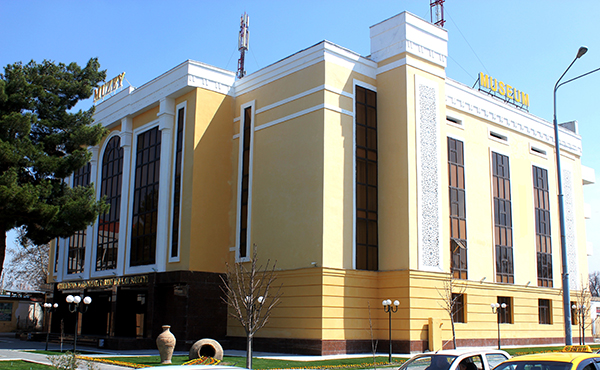
- Samarkhand

- State Museum of Cultural History of Uzbekistan State Museum of Cultural History of Uzbekistan (Uzbekistan)
- Established: 1892
- Location: 148, M.Ulugbek str., Samarkand, Uzbekistan
- Coordinates: 39°40′00″N 66°55′40″E
- Type: Archaeological and cultural
- Director: Samibayev Masud Kimovich

The State Museum of Cultural History of Uzbekistan (Oʻzbekiston madaniyati tarixi davlat muzeyi,) is a museum of history, art and culture in Samarkand. Founded in 1892, the museum is a non-profit educational organisation currently operating from 148, Mirzo Ulugbek Street, Samarkand. The museum has departments of history, ethnography and art, with the administration of the Samarkand State Museum-Reserve located in the building.

== Administrative history ==
Since 1982, it has been the main museum within the Samarkand State Museum-Reserve. The names over time have been as follows:

1896-1911: Samarqand statistika qoʻmitasi muzeyi; 1911-1918: Samarqand shahar muzeyi; 1918-1930: Samarqand viloyat muzeyi; 1930-1937: Oʻzbekiston Davlat markaziy muzeyi; 1937-1945: Samarqand viloyat tarixiy-oʻlkashunoslik muzeyi 1945-1955: Oʻzbek xalqi madaniyati Respublika muzeyi; 1955-1969: Oʻzbekiston madaniyati va sanʼati tarixi Respublika muzeyi; 1969-1982: Akmal Ikramov nomidagi Oʻzbekiston madaniyati tarixi Samarqand Davlat muzeyi

From 1978, the museum was in a building in Registan Square (architect M.S. Bulatov) but was moved to the present location in 2009 while a new, purpose-built museum is planned.

== Collections ==
The museum has a famous silver bowl from the period of the Alchon Huns (6th century CE), named the "Chilek bowl". The "Chilek bowl" is considered as the "best known specimen of Hephthalite art", which is similar in composition with the Hephthalite silver bowl in the British Museum, but represents "six dancers in Indian costume with Iranian ribbons and Hephthalite-short heads". It is considered as an Alchon object, but possibly manufactured in India at the request of the Alchons.

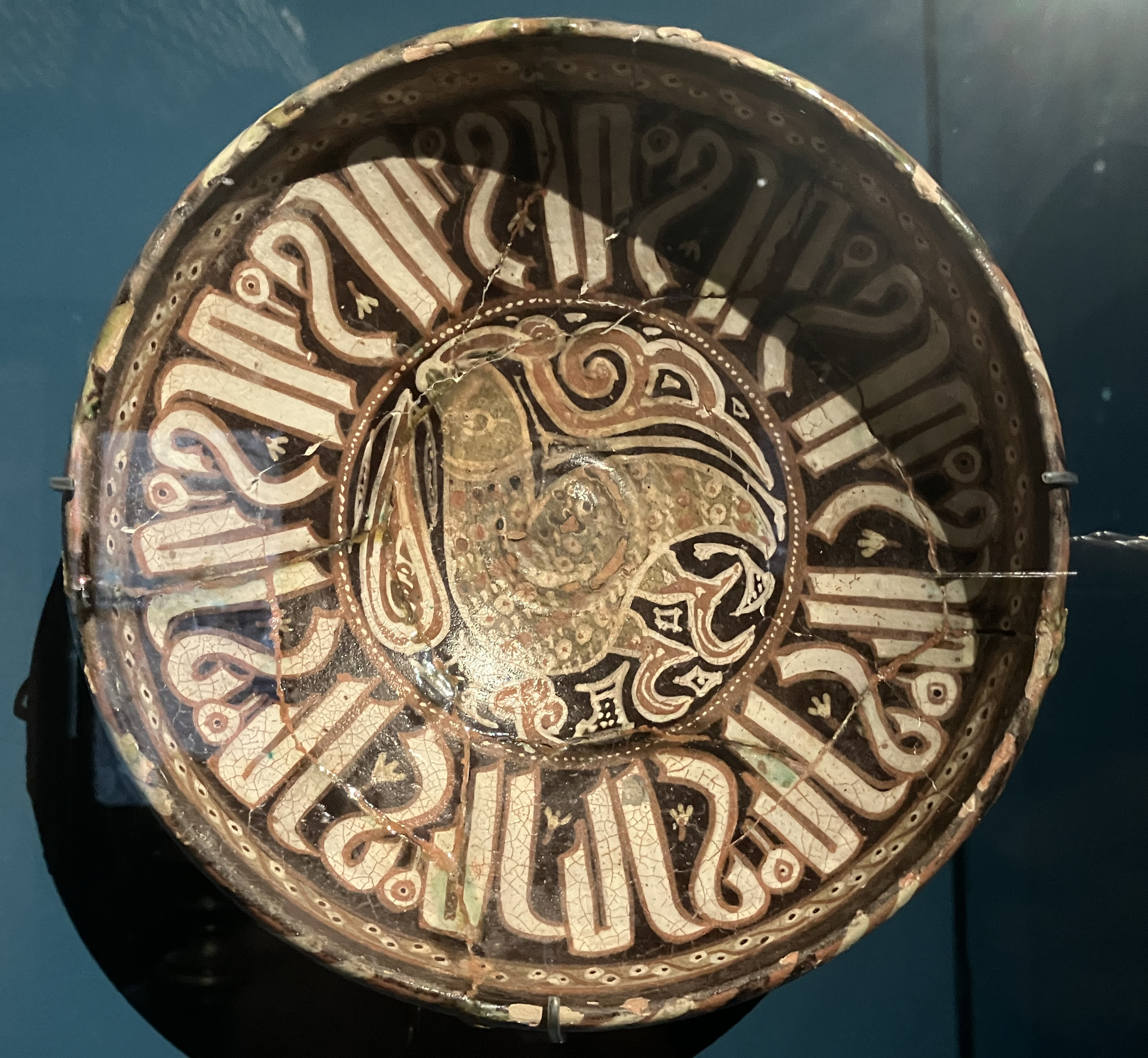
Bowl with bird. Afrasiab (Samarkand), 11th century.

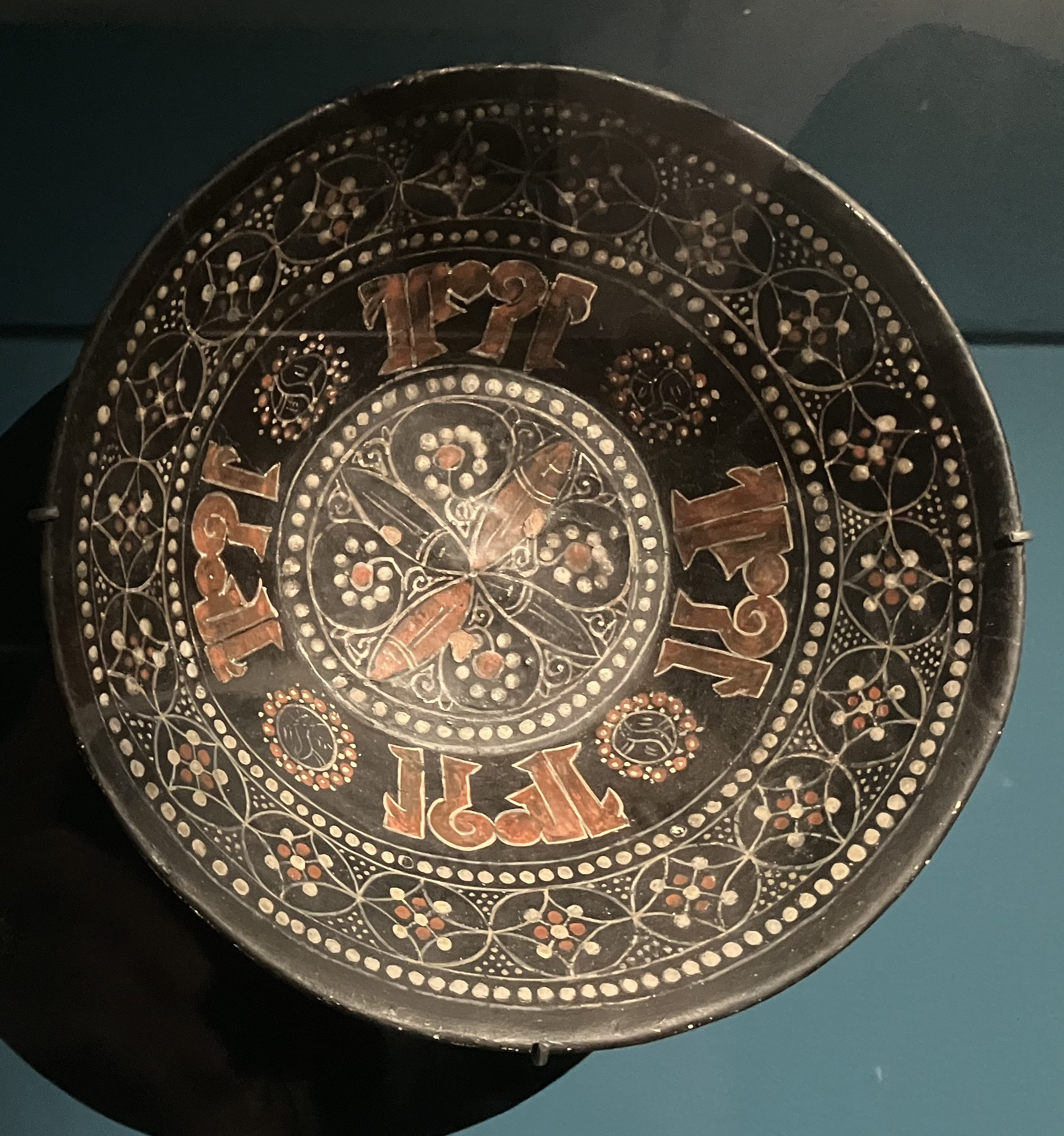
Decorated bowl. Afrasiab (Samarkand), 11th century.

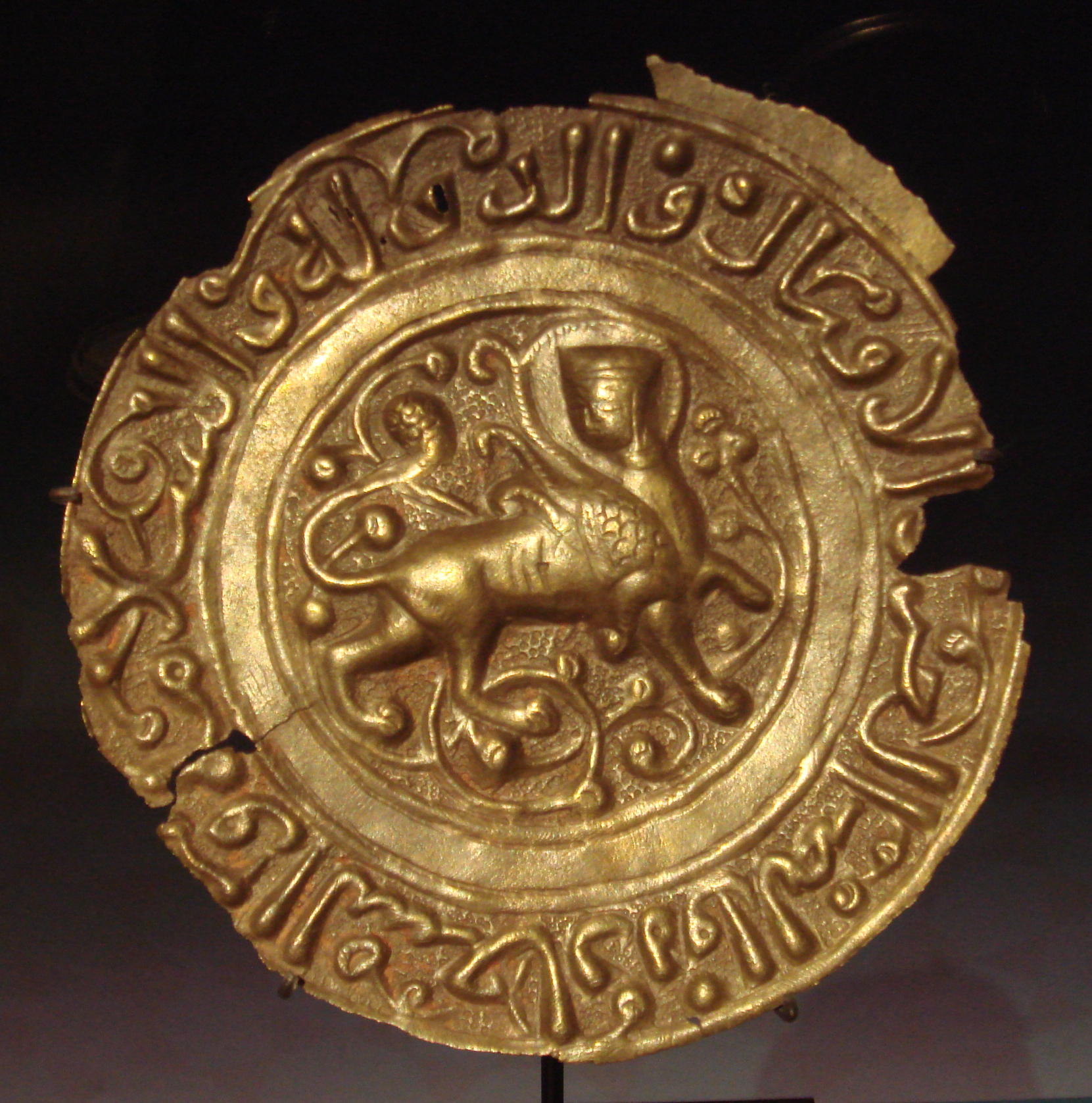
Mirror with figure of a Harpy, 11-12th century, Termez.

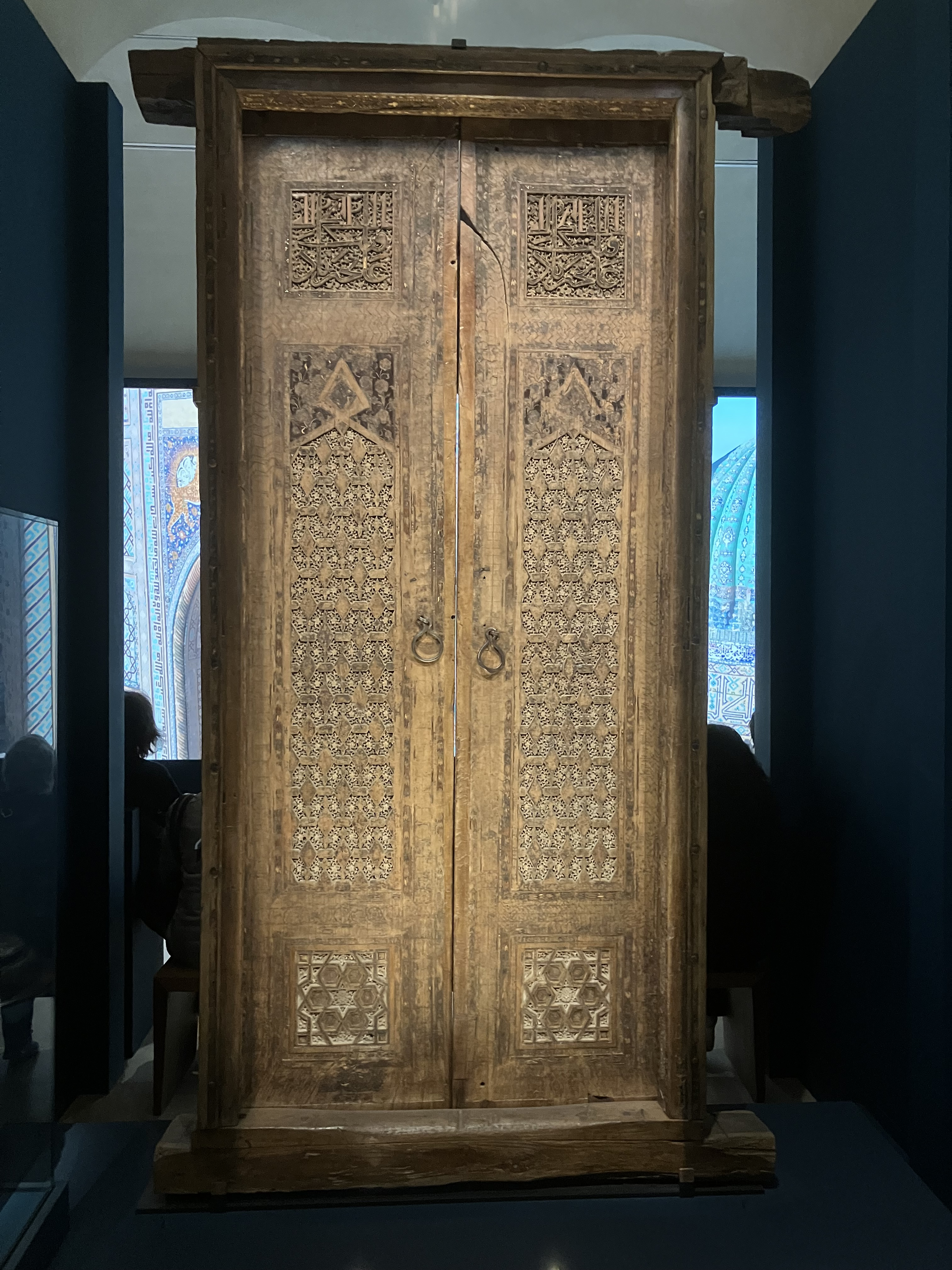
Wooden gate from the Gur-i Mir, with sculpted decoration, traces of polychromy and micro-mosaics (khatamkari). State Museum of History of Culture of Uzbekistan.
