= Hephthalite silver bowl =

Hunnish bowl from Gandhara

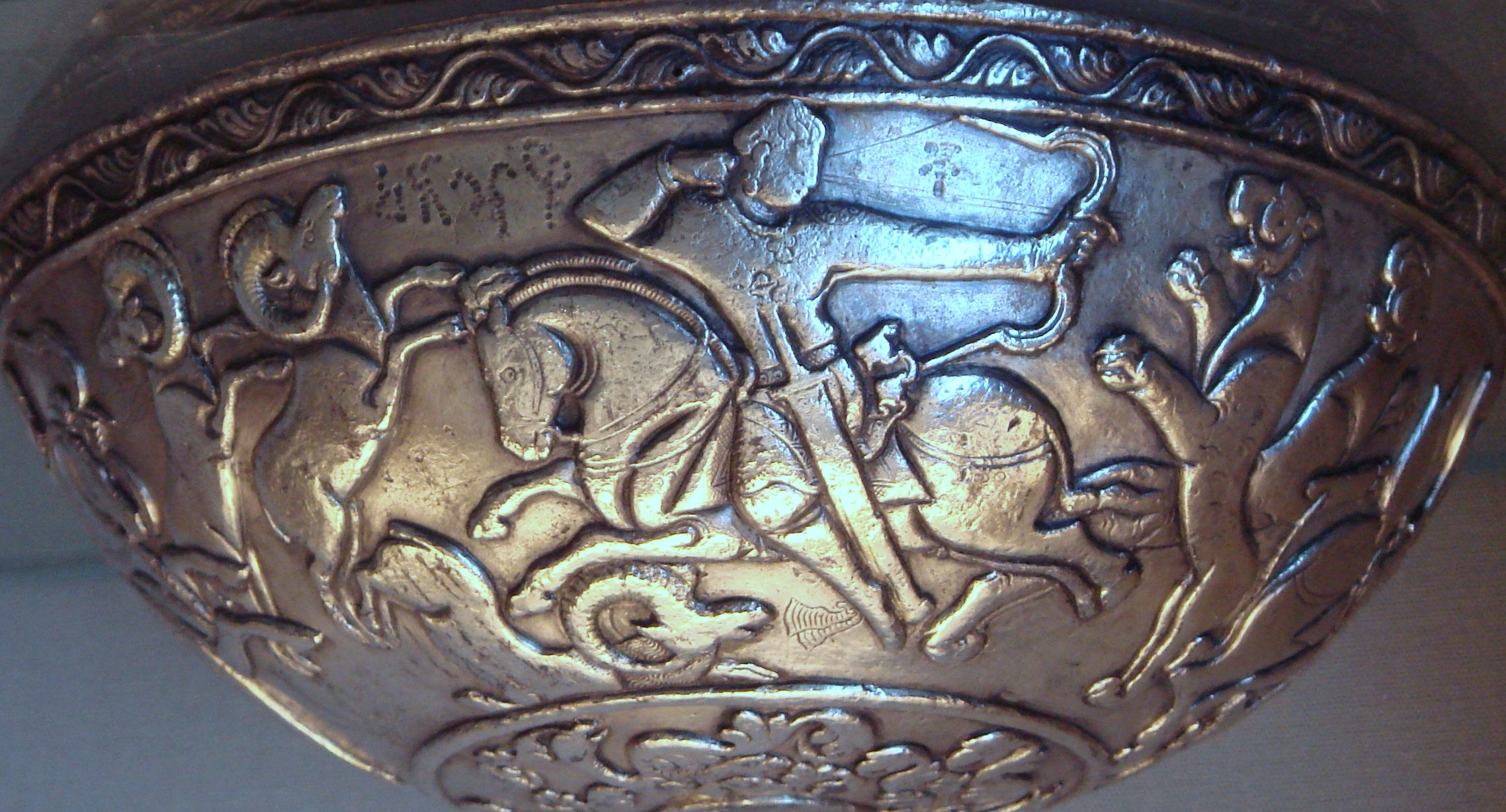
- The Hepthalite silver bowl in the British Museum.
- Material: Silver
- Created: 460-479 CE
- Discovered: Swat region, Pakistan; 35.12°N 72.29°E
- Present location: British Museum, London
- Registration: 1912,0725.1

Location
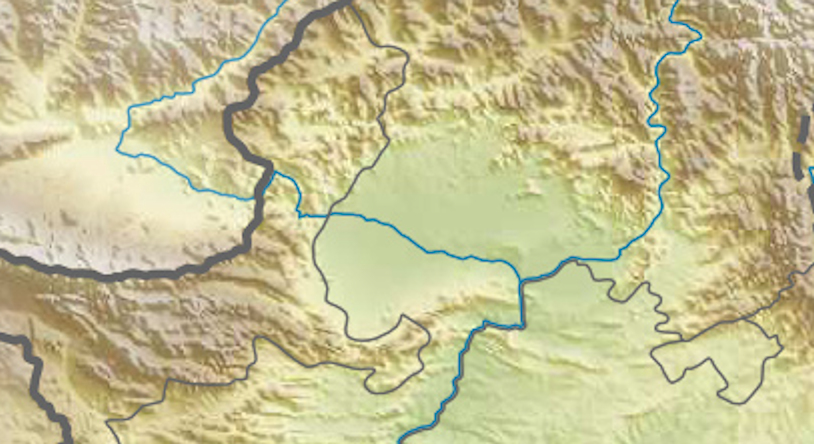

The Hephthalite silver bowl is a bowl discovered in the Swat region of Gandhara, Pakistan, and now in the British Museum. It dates from 460 to 479 CE, and the images represent two different Huna tribes, suggesting a period of peaceful coexistence between the Kidarites and the Alchons.

== Description ==
The bowl is dated to 460-479 CE, at the end of Kidarite rule and the beginning of Alchon ruler in northwestern India, although slightly earlier dates have also been suggested.

The bowl represents a groups of four noble figures on horse, in the process of hunting animals. Despite its former attribution to the "Hephthalites", hence its long-standing name, the bowl is thought to represent two Kidarite noble hunters wearing their characteristic crowns, and two Alchons, with their characteristic skull deformation, one of the Alchons reappearing in portrait inside a medallion at the bottom of the bowl. This combination of two different Huna tribes in the same work of art suggests a period of peaceful coexistence between the Kidarites and the Alchons, who may have each been in control of their own territory, although the Alchons would eventually replace the Kidarites in Gandhara. This understanding of the iconography of the Hephthalite silver bowl is the result of a general scholarly consensus.

At one point, the Kidarites withdrew from Gandhara, and the Alchons took over their territory and their mints, from the time of Khingila. By 520, Gandhara was definitely under Hephthalite (Alchon Huns) control, according to Chinese pilgrims.

=== Inscription ===
The bowl contains an inscription in Brahmi script, next to the head of one of the Alchon hunters. Scholars have disagreed on the reading, but it has been suggested it could be the name of the Alchon ruler Khingila. The comparison with the Brahmi lettering for his name on the later coinage of Khingila indeed may suggest that the name Khingila is intended in the vase inscription, even though the dot-by-dot engraving is rather clumsy and does not perfectly match standard typography.

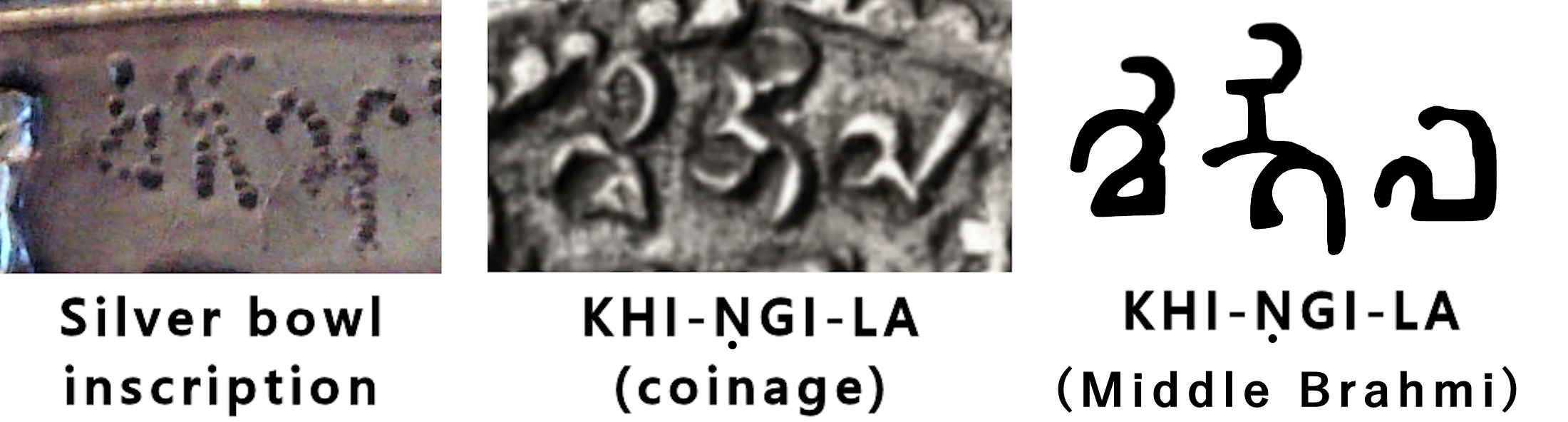

== Views ==
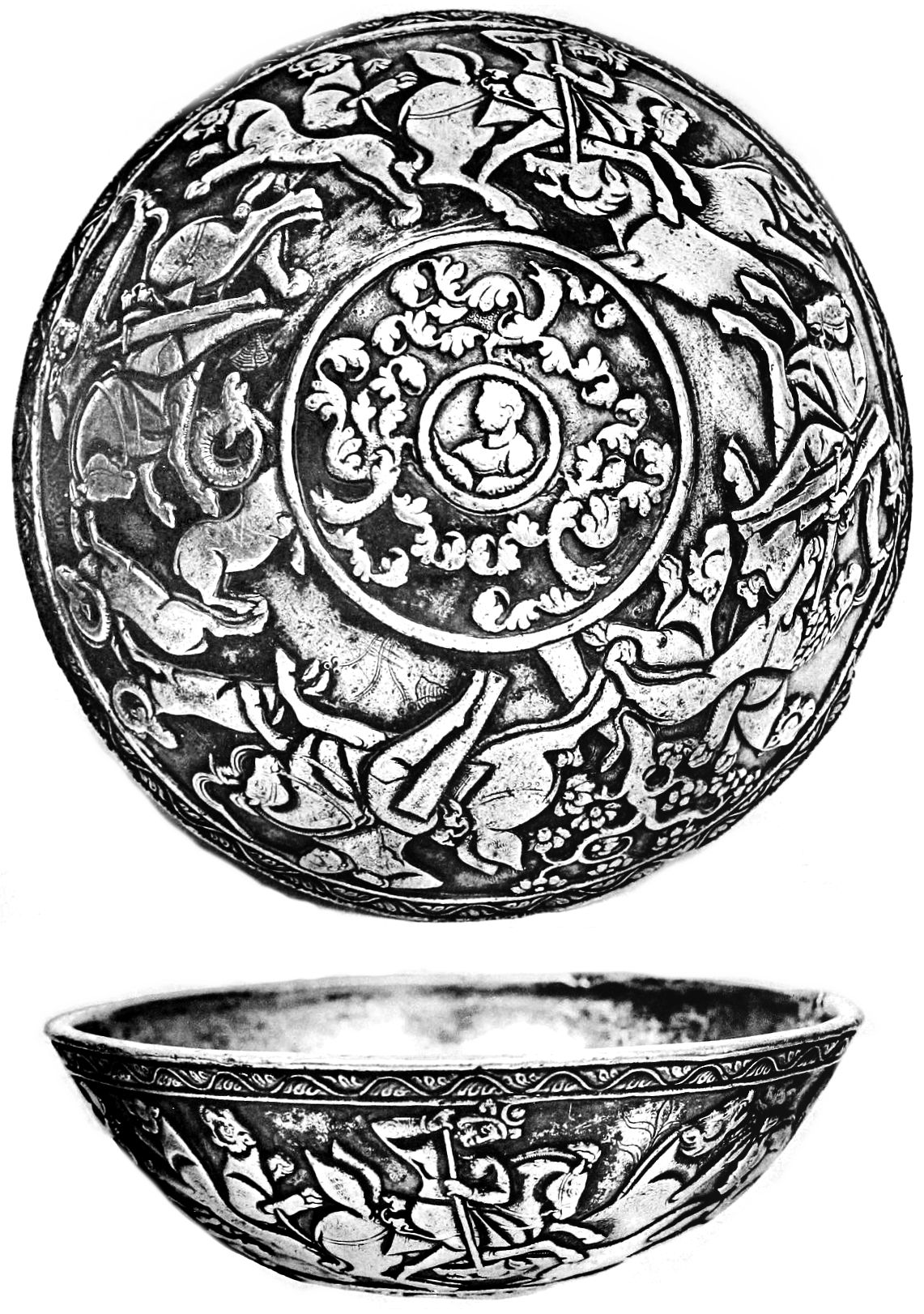
Bowl in full

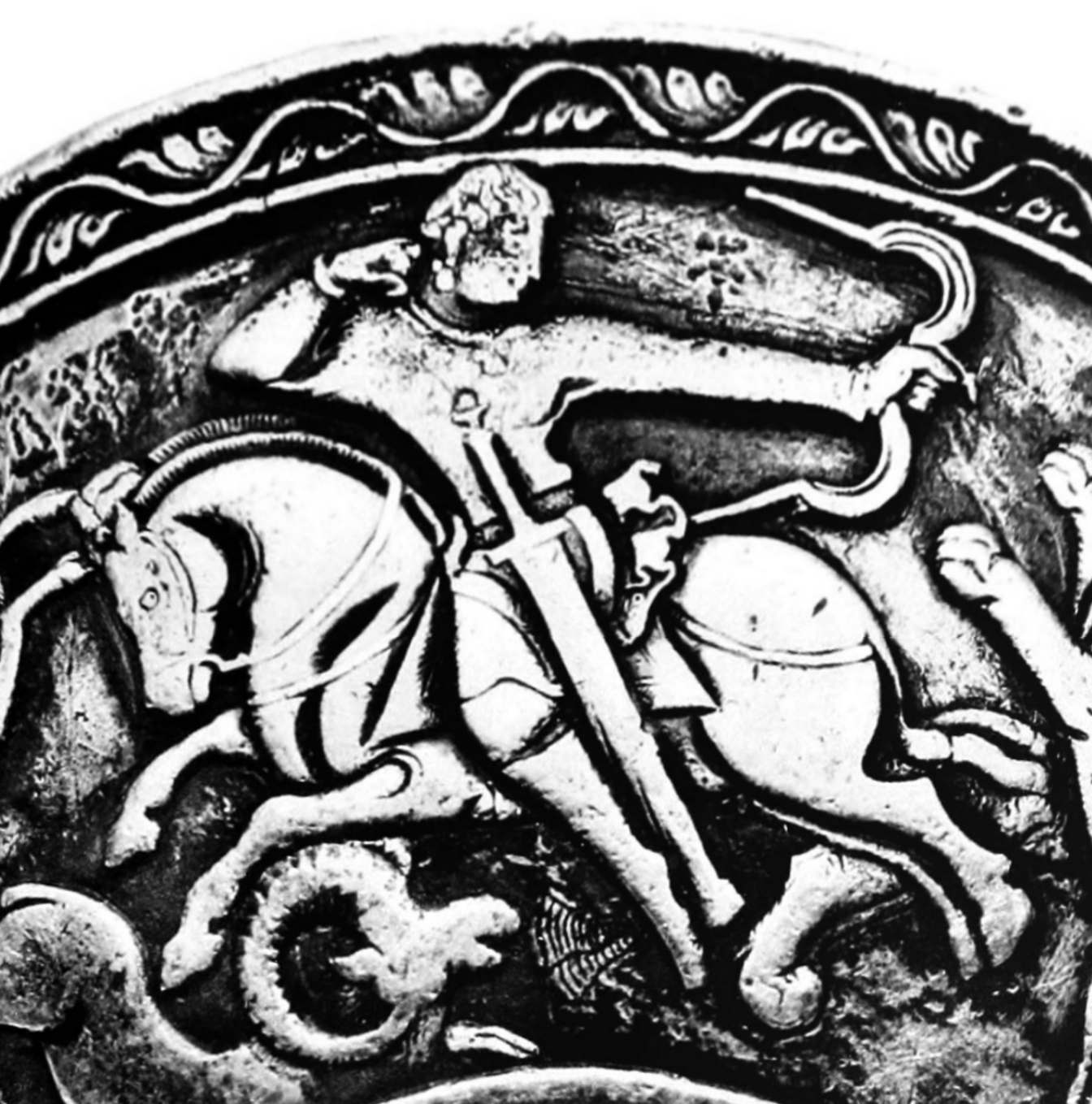
Alchon horseman

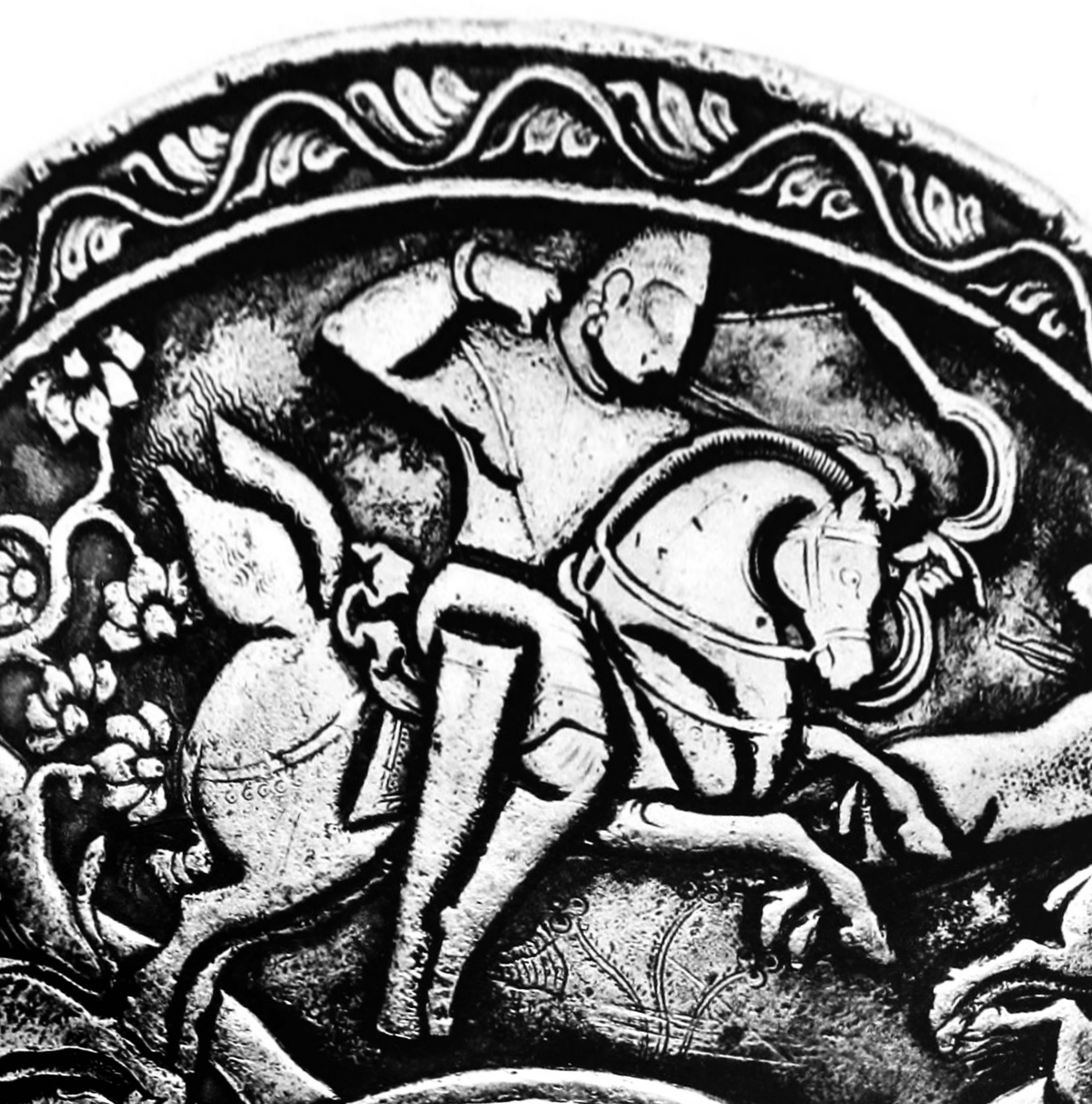
Alchon horseman

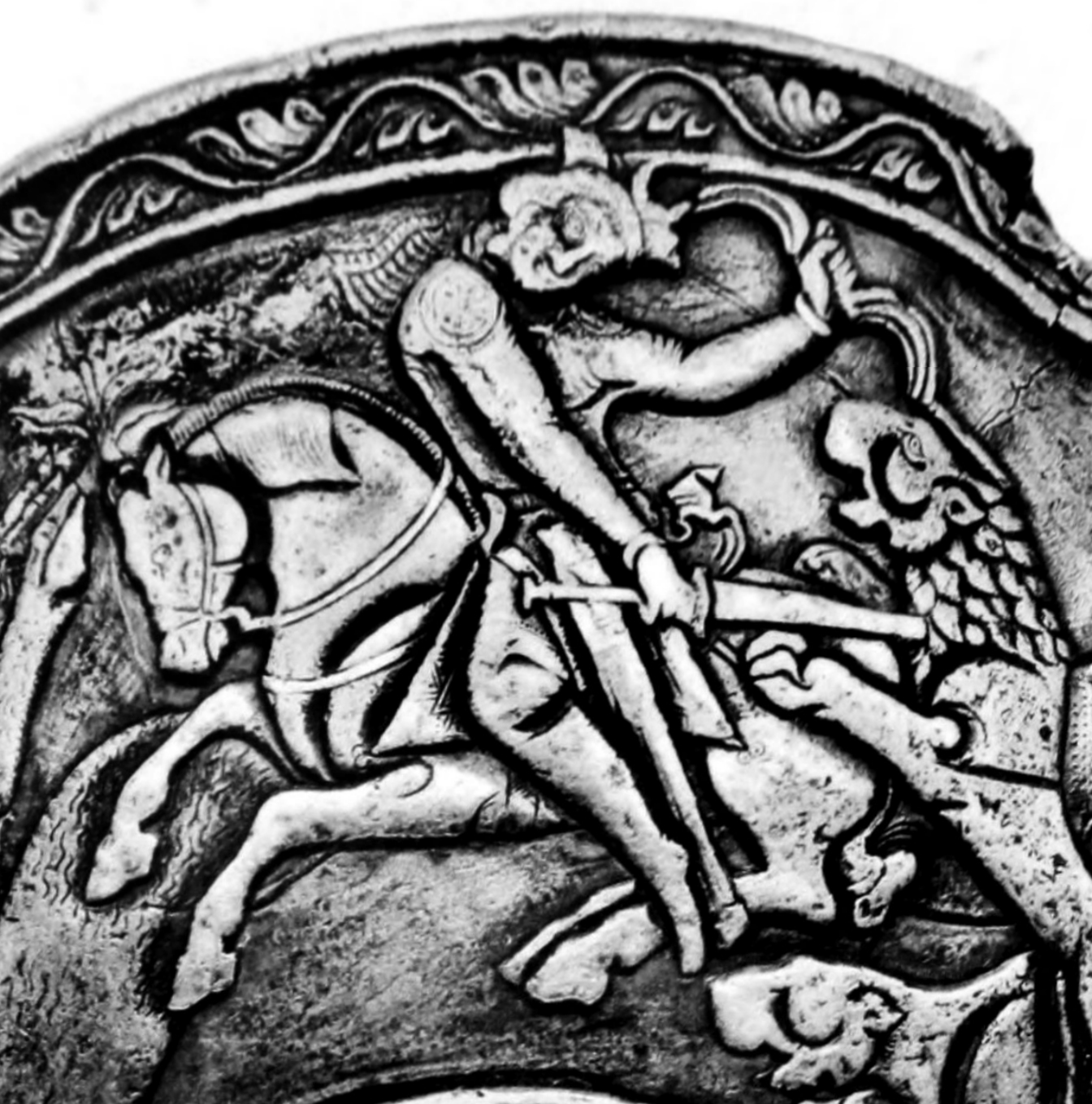
Kidarite horseman

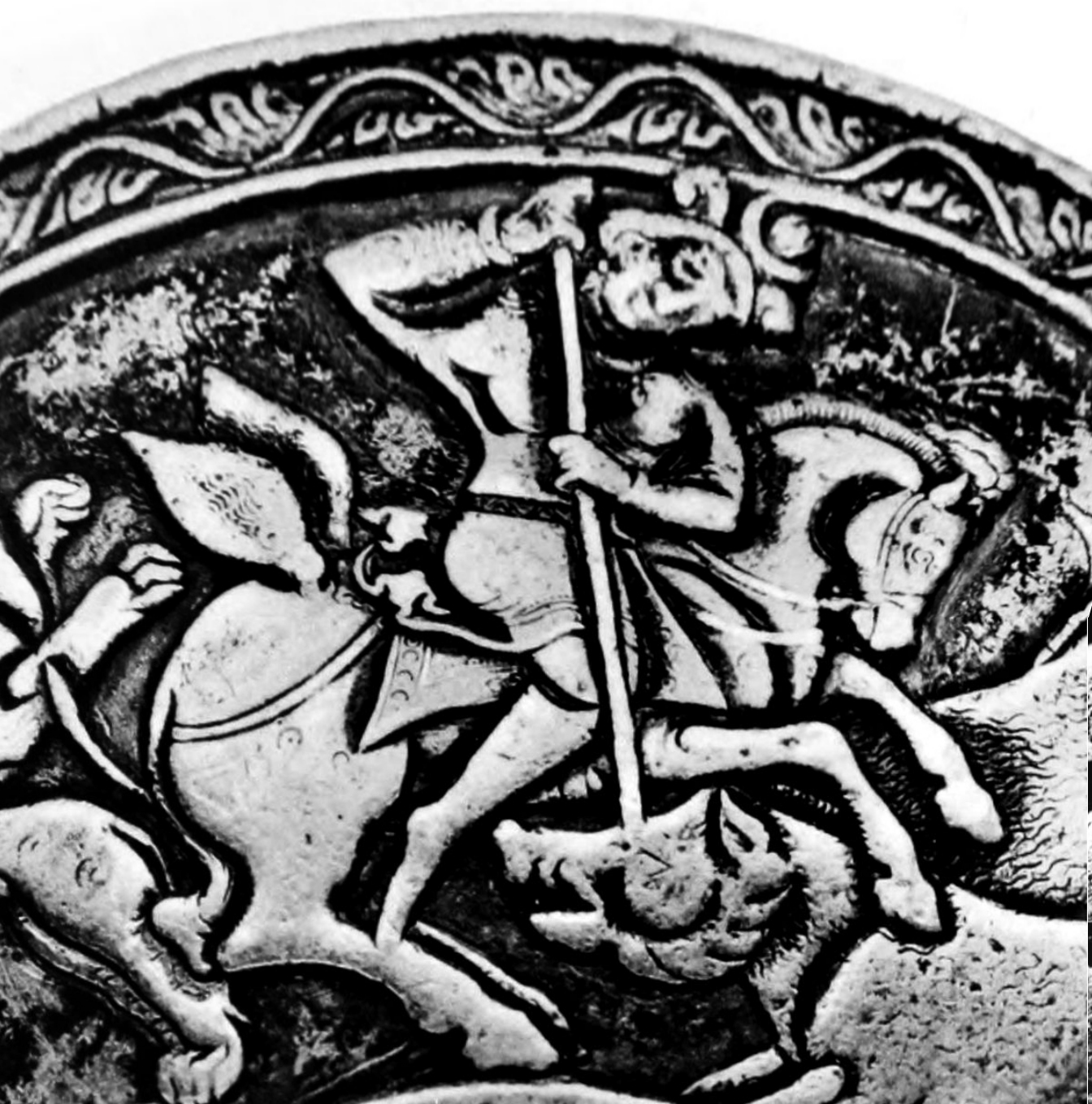
Kidarite horseman

== Other examples ==
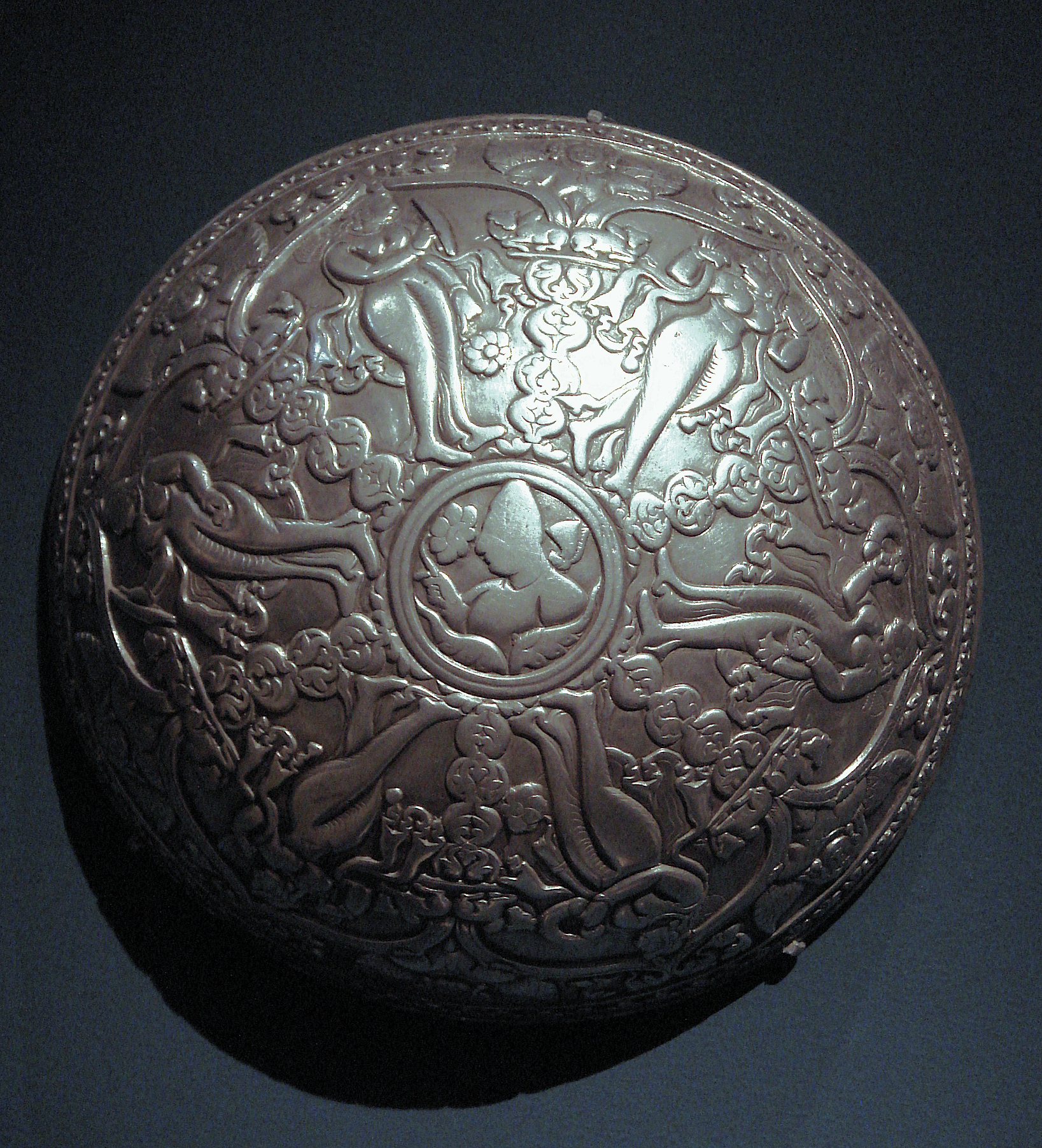
The Chilek bowl, with an Alchon Hun ruler in the central medallion.

Other examples of very similar silver bowls have been found in the area of Samarkand, including the "Chilek bowl" ("Čilek bowl"), considered as the "best known specimen of Hephthalite art", which is similar in composition with the Hephthalite silver bowl, but represents "six dancers in Indian costume with Iranian ribbons and Hephthalite-short heads". It, too, is considered as an Alchon object, but possibly manufactured in India at the request of the Alchons. It is now in the Samarkand Museum.

The man in the medallion at the bottom of the Chilek bowl has a clearly elongated skull, characteristic of the Alchons Huns.

== See also ==
- Sasanian (or later) silver bowl, 7th-8th century CE
- Shallow bowl, probably Afghanistan, Sasanian period, 5th-7th century CE, silver, gilt
