= Foreign relations of Uzbekistan =

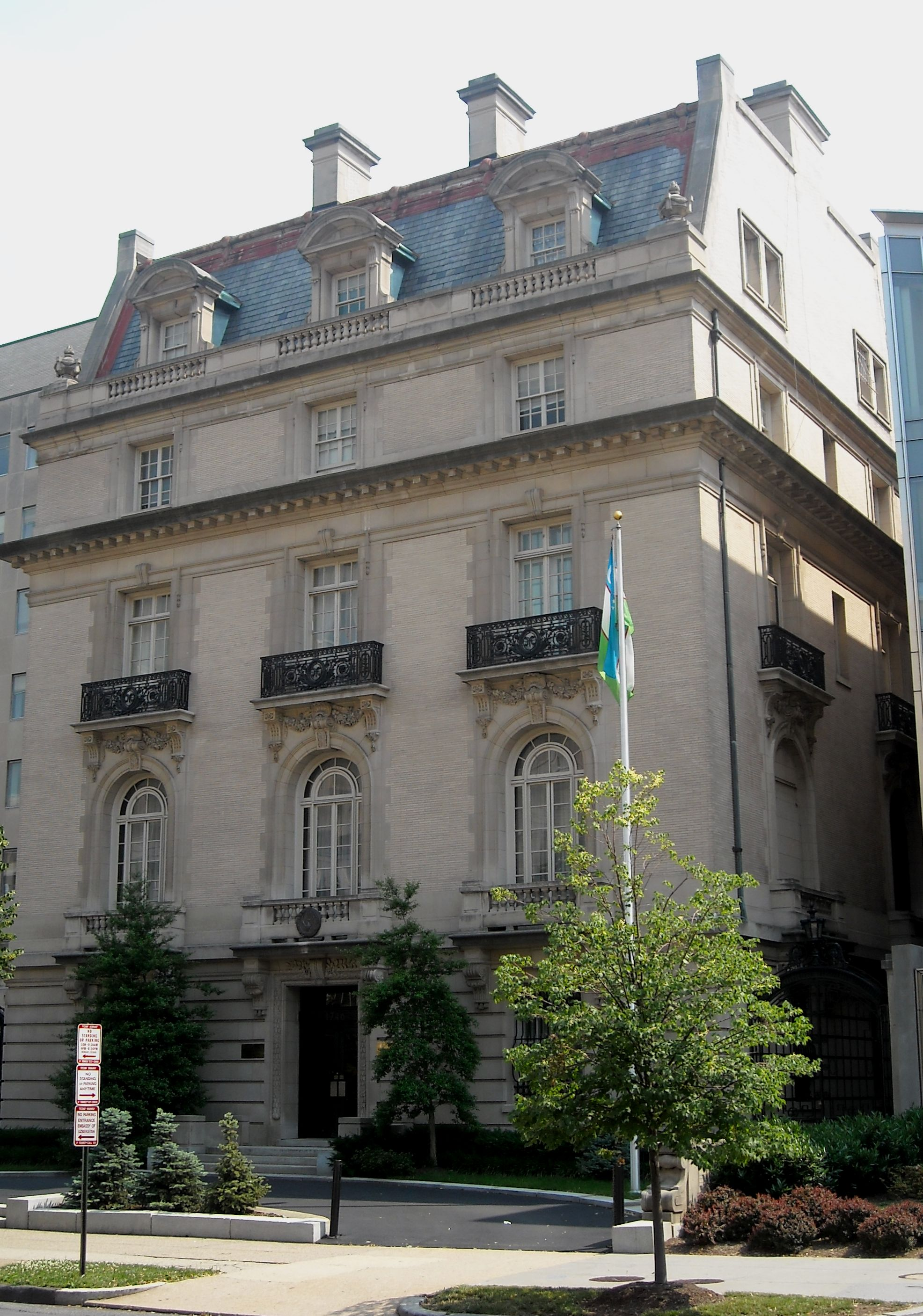
Embassy of Uzbekistan in Washington, D.C.

Uzbekistan joined the Commonwealth of Independent States in December 1991. However, it is opposed to reintegration and withdrew from the CIS collective security arrangement in 1999. Since that time, Uzbekistan has participated in the CIS peacekeeping force in Tajikistan and in United Nations-organized groups to help solve the Tajik and Afghan conflicts, both of which it sees as posing threats to its own stability. Uzbekistan is an active supporter of U.S. efforts against worldwide terrorism and joined the coalitions which have dealt with both Afghanistan and Iraq (although, in 2005, relations with the U.S. were strained after the May 2005 unrest and Uzbekistan demanded that the U.S. leave Karshi-Khanabad). It is a member of the United Nations, the Euro-Atlantic Partnership Council, Partnership for Peace, and the Organization for Security and Cooperation in Europe (OSCE). It belongs to the Organisation of Islamic Cooperation (OIC) and the Economic Cooperation Organization, which comprises 7 Central Asian countries: Pakistan, Uzbekistan, Kazakhstan, Turkmenistan, Afghanistan, Kyrgyzstan and Tajikistan. It is a founding member of and remains involved in the Central Asian Union, formed with Kazakhstan and Kyrgyzstan, joined in March 1998 by Tajikistan.

In 1999, Uzbekistan joined the GUAM alliance (Georgia, Ukraine, Azerbaijan and Moldova), which was formed in 1997 (temporarily making it GUUAM until Uzbekistan withdrew in 2005). Uzbekistan is also a member of the Shanghai Cooperation Organisation (SCO) and hosts the SCO's Regional Anti-Terrorist Structure (RATS) in Tashkent. Uzbekistan is also candidate state of the new Eurasian Economic Union (EAEU).

== Diplomatic relations ==
List of countries which Uzbekistan maintains diplomatic relations with:

#	Country	Date
1	Australia	26 December 1991
2	China	2 January 1992
3	Vietnam	17 January 1992
4	Egypt	23 January 1992
5	Mongolia	25 January 1992
6	Denmark	25 January 1992
7	Japan	26 January 1992
8	South Korea	29 January 1992
9	North Korea	7 February 1992
10	United Kingdom	18 February 1992
11	United States	19 February 1992
12	Saudi Arabia	20 February 1992
13	Malaysia	21 February 1992
14	Israel	21 February 1992
15	Finland	26 February 1992
16	France	1 March 1992
17	Hungary	3 March 1992
18	Turkey	4 March 1992
19	Germany	6 March 1992
20	Belgium	10 March 1992
21	New Zealand	11 March 1992
22	Greece	16 March 1992
23	Mexico	16 March 1992
24	Spain	17 March 1992
25	India	18 March 1992
26	Poland	19 March 1992
27	Russia	20 March 1992
28	Italy	24 March 1992
29	Syria	24 March 1992
30	Austria	25 March 1992
31	Canada	7 April 1992
32	Sweden	8 April 1992
33	Philippines	13 April 1992
34	Oman	22 April 1992
35	Thailand	6 May 1992
36	Switzerland	7 May 1992
37	Iran	10 May 1992
38	Pakistan	10 May 1992
39	Yemen	25 May 1992
40	Bahrain	29 May 1992
41	Luxembourg	10 June 1992
42	Norway	10 June 1992
43	Indonesia	23 June 1992
44	Algeria	30 June 1992
45	Lithuania	5 August 1992
46	Portugal	12 August 1992
47	South Africa	12 August 1992
48	Ukraine	25 August 1992
49	Nigeria	28 August 1992
50	Laos	10 September 1992
51	Bulgaria	12 September 1992
52	Afghanistan	13 October 1992
53	Bangladesh	15 October 1992
—	Holy See	17 October 1992
54	Tajikistan	22 October 1992
55	United Arab Emirates	25 October 1992
56	Latvia	3 November 1992
57	Kazakhstan	23 November 1992
58	Netherlands	24 November 1992
59	Tunisia	26 November 1992
60	Czech Republic	1 January 1993
61	Slovakia	1 January 1993
62	Belarus	21 January 1993
63	Turkmenistan	7 February 1993
64	Jordan	15 February 1993
65	Kyrgyzstan	16 February 1993
66	Malta	25 February 1993
67	Brazil	30 April 1993
68	Iraq	19 June 1993
69	Guinea	24 June 1993
70	Argentina	9 September 1993
71	Morocco	11 October 1993
72	Ghana	28 October 1993
73	Albania	23 November 1993
74	Zambia	1 February 1994
75	Kuwait	8 July 1994
76	Georgia	19 August 1994
77	Moldova	23 August 1994
78	Chile	15 September 1994
79	Chad	16 September 1994
—	State of Palestine	25 September 1994
80	Estonia	25 October 1994
81	Maldives	7 December 1994
82	North Macedonia	31 December 1994
83	Slovenia	16 January 1995
84	Serbia	18 January 1995
85	Croatia	6 February 1995
86	Cambodia	7 September 1995
87	Azerbaijan	2 October 1995
88	Romania	6 October 1995
89	Senegal	6 October 1995
90	Armenia	27 October 1995
91	Venezuela	26 April 1996
92	Bosnia and Herzegovina	14 May 1996
93	Brunei	20 June 1996
94	Ethiopia	15 July 1996
95	Jamaica	8 August 1996
96	Mali	13 February 1997
97	Singapore	8 April 1997
98	Cyprus	30 May 1997
99	Iceland	25 September 1997
100	Ireland	7 November 1997
101	Qatar	27 November 1997
102	Uruguay	25 May 1998
103	Lebanon	22 October 1998
104	Mauritius	4 August 1999
105	Namibia	30 August 1999
106	Sri Lanka	11 October 1999
107	Peru	22 December 1999
108	Myanmar	8 February 2001
109	Costa Rica	7 June 2001
110	Paraguay	27 August 2001
111	Angola	29 May 2002
112	Sudan	6 January 2005
113	Comoros	21 May 2005
114	Benin	17 August 2005
115	Cuba	13 March 2006
116	Montenegro	19 December 2006
117	Guatemala	9 February 2007
118	Nicaragua	23 February 2007
119	Honduras	26 April 2007
120	Dominican Republic	28 September 2007
121	Zimbabwe	18 January 2008
122	Mauritania	2 July 2008
123	Andorra	1 December 2009
124	Fiji	16 June 2010
125	Libya	27 October 2010
126	Ecuador	19 July 2011
127	Colombia	2 October 2012
128	Bolivia	28 November 2012
129	Monaco	29 November 2013
130	El Salvador	3 December 2014
131	Nepal	26 January 2018
132	Grenada	11 October 2019
133	San Marino	3 February 2021
134	Dominica	14 May 2021
135	Panama	29 November 2021
136	Saint Kitts and Nevis	9 March 2022
137	Saint Vincent and the Grenadines	10 May 2022
138	Antigua and Barbuda	13 June 2022
139	Guyana	10 October 2022
140	Sierra Leone	28 April 2023
141	Trinidad and Tobago	15 June 2023
142	Uganda	18 January 2024
143	Liechtenstein	5 March 2024
144	Belize	5 March 2024
145	Gambia	14 March 2024
146	Djibouti	2 May 2024
147	Cape Verde	23 September 2024
148	Seychelles	23 September 2024
149	Burundi	24 September 2024
150	Botswana	26 September 2024
151	Liberia	26 September 2024
152	Togo	26 September 2024
153	Bahamas	26 September 2024
154	Somalia	5 February 2025
155	Suriname	21 February 2025
156	Nauru	20 March 2025
157	Ivory Coast	29 April 2025
158	Mozambique	21 June 2025
159	Eritrea	10 July 2025
160	Saint Lucia	10 September 2025
161	Kenya	19 September 2025
162	Palau	26 September 2025
163	Lesotho	27 March 2026
164	Rwanda	18 April 2026
165	Guinea-Bissau	22 April 2026
166	Vanuatu	22 September 2026

== Relations by country ==
=== Africa ===
Country	Formal relations began	Notes
Egypt	23 January 1992	On 26 December 1991, Egypt became the first Arab nation to recognize Uzbekistan's independence. On 23 January 1992, the two countries signed a joint communiqué formally establishing diplomatic ties.; Egypt has an embassy in Tashkent since 1993.; Uzbekistan has an embassy in Cairo since 1995.
Ethiopia	15 July 1996	Both countries established diplomatic relations on 15 July 1996. Since then, they have promoted collaboration based on the values of respect for one another, sovereign equality, and non-interference in one another's domestic affairs.
Kenya	19 September 2025	Kenya is accredited to Uzbekistan from its embassy in Tehran.; Uzbekistan is accredited to Kenya from its embassy in Muscat.
South Africa	12 August 1992	Both countries established diplomatic relations in 1992.; South Africa is accredited to Uzbekistan from its embassy in Ankara.; Uzbekistan is accredited to South Africa from its embassy in Doha.
Tanzania	No formal diplomatic relations	In 2024, the aviation authorities of Tanzania and Uzbekistan signed an air services agreement to enhance bilateral relations between the two countries.; on 27 April 2026, the two countries' ambassadors to Qatar held a meeting to discuss strengthening diplomatic ties and promoting strategic cooperation in priority sectors.

=== Americas ===
Country	Formal relations began	Notes
Cuba	2006	Both countries established diplomatic relations on 13 March 2006.; Cuba is accredited to Uzbekistan from its embassy in Baku.; Uzbekistan is accredited to Cuba from its embassy in Washington, D.C..; In May 1963, Fidel Castro visited the Uzbek SSR on an official visit, being bosted by the Uzbek Communist First Secretary Sharof Rashidov.; In 2016, Cuba became the only country in the world (other than Uzbekistan itself) that declared an official period of mourning in connection with the death of President Islam Karimov, with many speculating that this was because of Castro's reported liking towards the late Uzbek leader.
Mexico	14 January 1992	Mexico is accredited to Uzbekistan from its embassy in Tehran, Iran.; Uzbekistan is accredited to Mexico from its Permanent Mission to the United Nations in New York City, United States.
United States	1992	See United States–Uzbekistan relations: The United States recognized the independence of Uzbekistan on 25 December 1991, and opened an embassy in Tashkent in March 1992.; The United States has an embassy in Tashkent.; Uzbekistan has an embassy in Washington, D.C. and a consulate–general in New York City.

=== Asia ===
Country	Formal relations began	Notes
Afghanistan		See Afghanistan–Uzbekistan relations
Armenia	1995	See Armenia–Uzbekistan relations: The countries established diplomatic relations on 27 October 1995 by protocol.; Uzbekistan is represented in Armenia through its embassy in Moscow, Russia.; Both countries are members of the Commonwealth of Independent States and Commonwealth of Independent States Free Trade Area.
Azerbaijan	1995	See Azerbaijan–Uzbekistan relations: The countries established diplomatic relations on 2 October 1995 by protocol.; Azerbaijan has an embassy in Tashkent.; Uzbekistan has an embassy in Baku.
China	3 January 1992	See China–Uzbekistan relations: Uzbekistan has an embassy in Beijing and two consulate-generals in Guangzhou and Shanghai.; China has an embassy in Tashkent.
India	18 March 1992	See India–Uzbekistan relations: India has an embassy in Tashkent.; Uzbekistan has an embassy in New Delhi.
Indonesia	23 June 1992	See Indonesia–Uzbekistan relations: On 28 December 1991, Indonesia has recognized the independence of the Republic of Uzbekistan from the dissolved Soviet Union.; Uzbekistan realized the strategic importance of Indonesia, home to the world's biggest Muslim population and Southeast Asia's biggest economy.; Indonesia recognizes Uzbekistan's strategic importance as the gate to Central Asia, a growing economy and a potential market.; Indonesia has an embassy in Tashkent that is also accredited to Kyrgyzstan.; Uzbekistan has an embassy in Jakarta.
Iran	1991	See Iran–Uzbekistan relations: The two countries have deep cultural and historical ties, and Uzbekistan is considered as a part of Greater Iran. Iran has been especially active in pursuing economic projects and social, cultural, and diplomatic initiatives in Uzbekistan. The two nations have also worked on overland links and other joint ventures. The countries' conflicting political set-ups (Iran's Islamic theocracy versus Uzbekistan's secular republic) does not appear to have deterred efforts to improve relations.
Kazakhstan		See Kazakhstan–Uzbekistan relations
Kyrgyzstan		See Kyrgyzstan–Uzbekistan relations: Uzbekistan dominates southern Kyrgyzstan both economically and politically, based on the large Uzbek population in that region of Kyrgyzstan and on economic and geographic conditions.
Malaysia	1992	See Malaysia–Uzbekistan relations: Malaysia has an embassy in Tashkent.; Uzbekistan has an embassy in Kuala Lumpur.
Oman	22 April 1992	On 31 March 2009, Uzbekistan and Oman agreed upon a legal framework to protect Omani investments in Central Asia and guarantee trade from both nations was free from double taxation. Oman's government had been pursuing economic diversification and privatisation policies for nearly a decade after signing similar agreements with thirty other trading partners.
Pakistan		See Pakistan–Uzbekistan relations: Relations between the two states were established when the republic of Uzbekistan became independent following the collapse of the USSR, the relations between the two countries were initially strained by the situation in Afghanistan which both countries border as they supported different Afghan factions.; However relations improved after the fall of the Taliban, both countries seeking to improve relations for the sake of trade, Pakistan wishing to gain access to Central Asian markets and landlocked Uzbekistan to access ports on the Indian Ocean.
South Korea	29 January 1992	See South Korea–Uzbekistan relations: Number of ethnic Koreans living in Uzbekistan: About 180,000 (Largest number among the CIS nations).
Tajikistan		Main article: Tajikistan–Uzbekistan relations: Tajikistan has an embassy in Tashkent.; Uzbekistan has an embassy in Dushanbe.; Western analysts said that the two countries were "engaged in an undeclared cold war" during Karimov's presidency.; Both countries are full members of the Eurasian Economic Community, the Collective Security Treaty Organisation, the Shanghai Cooperation Organisation, and the Commonwealth of Independent States.
Turkey	March 4, 1992	See Turkey–Uzbekistan relations: Uzbekistan has an embassy in Ankara and a Consulate General in Istanbul; Turkey has an embassy in Tashkent and a Consulate General in Samarkand since 7 March 2021; Both countries are members of Asia Cooperation Dialogue, Economic Cooperation Organization, International Organization of Turkic Culture, OIC, TAKM, Turkic Council, TURKPA, OSCE and WTO.; Trade volume between the two countries was US$2.3 billion in 2019 (Uzbek exports/imports: 1.14/1.23 billion USD.; Turkey was the first country that recognized Uzbekistan's independence in 1991.
Turkmenistan		Main article: Turkmenistan–Uzbekistan relations

=== Europe ===
Country	Formal relations began	Notes
Belarus	1992	See Belarus–Uzbekistan relations: Belarus has an embassy in Tashkent.; Uzbekistan has an embassy in Minsk.; Both countries are full members of the Commonwealth of Independent States
Bulgaria	1992-09-12	See Bulgaria–Uzbekistan relations: Bulgaria has an embassy in Tashkent.; Uzbekistan is represented in Bulgaria through a non resident ambassador based in Tashkent (in the Foreign Ministry.)
Finland	26 February 1992	In 2006, Antti Turunen, head of the Finnish Foreign Ministry's Eastern European and Central Asian department, led a European Union fact-finding mission to Tashkent. The Uzbek deputy foreign minister had indicated that the Uzbek government was interested in talks with the EU during a visit to Helsinki in June 2006, just before Finland assumed the EU presidency. Radio Free Europe journalists spoke to Turunen on September 1. Turunen's visit to Uzbekistan was the first EU visit since October, when sanctions were imposed after the Uzbek government refused to allow an international investigation into the Andijan massacre. Turunen said that the visit went smoothly and that Uzbek Foreign Minister Vladimir Norov offered a warm reception. The EU delegation met with officials from the Justice Ministry, the Attorney General's office, and Uzbek parliament members. He stressed that the real issue for the EU was the Uzbek government's response to the Andijan massacre and human rights abuses. He said Russia-Uzbek relations and possible EU development of Uzbek energy reserves were not directly discussed but that EU investment might be possible in this area.
Germany	1992	See Germany–Uzbekistan relations: Germany has an embassy in Tashkent.; Uzbekistan has an embassy in Berlin and a consulate general in Frankfurt.
Netherlands	24 November 1992	In July 2024, the ambassador of Uzbekistan met Director of the Europe Department of the Ministry of Foreign Affairs of the Netherlands, Erik Weststrate, to discuss bilateral and multilateral cooperation.
Poland	1992-03-19	See Poland–Uzbekistan relations: Poland has an embassy in Tashkent.; Uzbekistan has an embassy in Warsaw and an honorary consulate in Poznań.
Romania	1995-10-06	See Romania–Uzbekistan relations: Romania recognized Uzbekistan's independence on December 20, 1991.; Romania has an embassy in Tashkent, although Uzbekistan does not have any representation in Romania.; Romania sees Uzbekistan as a potentially important partner in Central Asia, where it is trying to increase its standing, while Uzbekistan hopes to receive increased access to technology and European markets via Romania.
Russia	1992	Main article: Russia–Uzbekistan relations: Uzbekistan has an embassy in Moscow; Russia has an embassy in Tashkent.; Uzbekistan was once a former Soviet Socialist republic. It still has strong ties to Russia and the West.; In the aftermath of the May 2005 unrest, Uzbekistan demanded that the United States leave the base at Karshi-Khanabad.; In November 2005, both presidents Islam Karimov and Vladimir Putin had signed a mutual cooperation agreement in Moscow.
Spain		See Spain–Uzbekistan relations: Spain is accredited to Uzbekistan from its embassy in Moscow, Russia.; Uzbekistan has an embassy in Madrid.
Ukraine	1992	Main article: Ukraine–Uzbekistan relations
United Kingdom	1992	See United Kingdom–Uzbekistan relations Uzbekistan established diplomatic relations with the United Kingdom on 18 February 1992.: Uzbekistan maintains an embassy in London.; The United Kingdom is accredited to Uzbekistan through its embassy in Tashkent.; Both countries share common membership of the OSCE. Bilaterally the two countries have a Partnership and Cooperation Agreement.

== See also ==
- List of diplomatic missions in Uzbekistan
- List of diplomatic missions of Uzbekistan
- Politics of Uzbekistan
