= List of diplomatic missions of Uzbekistan =

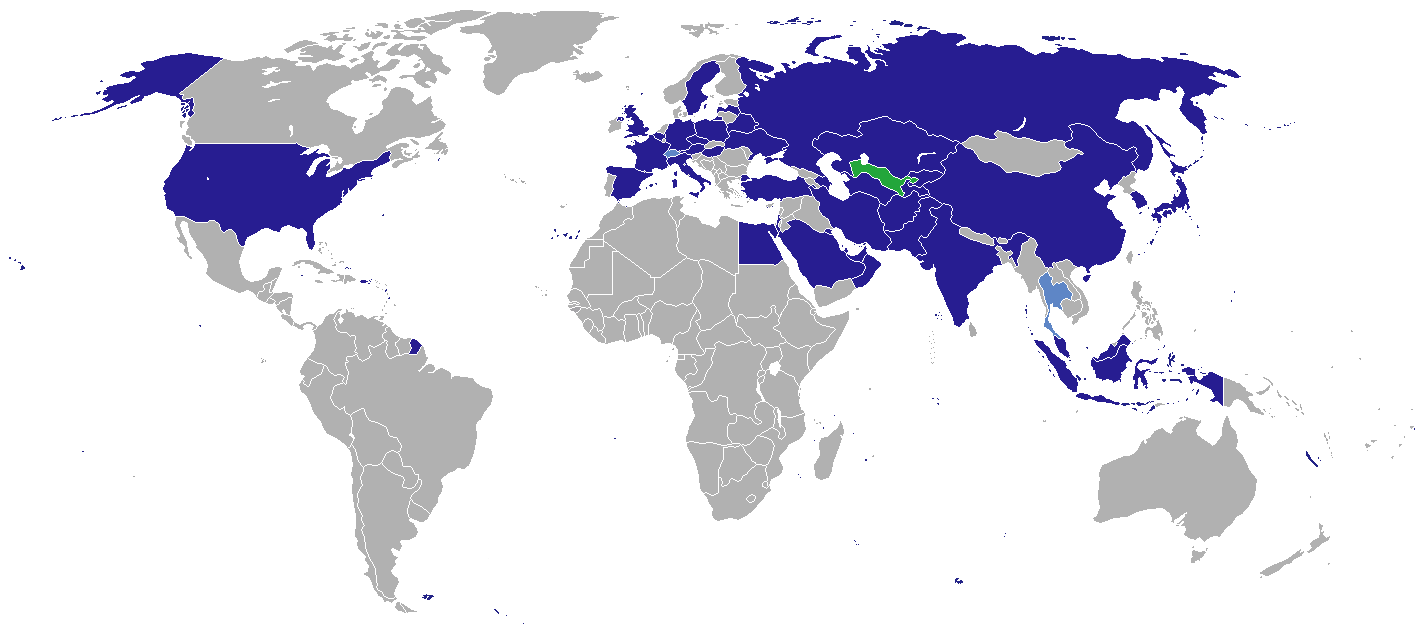
Diplomatic missions of Uzbekistan Countries that host an Embassy of Uzbekistan Countries that host only a Consulate-General and other representations Countries that do not host diplomatic mission of Uzbekistan Uzbekistan

This is a list of diplomatic missions of Uzbekistan. These missions are subordinate to the Ministry of Foreign Affairs of the Republic of Uzbekistan. The country maintains an active and steadily expanding network of embassies and consulates that reflect its growing engagement in regional and international affairs. Uzbekistan has significant interests in Central Asia, Eastern Europe, and the Near East, as well as in major political and economic centers around the world. Its diplomatic outreach reflects a balance between historical ties to Russia and the former Soviet states and new strategic partnerships with China, the United States, and the European Union.

After gaining independence from the Soviet Union, in 1991, Uzbekistan established its first embassies in neighboring states and major global capitals to assert its sovereignty and promote international recognition. In the early years, financial constraints and limited resources affected the scope of its diplomatic representation. However, the country gradually expanded its presence abroad, focusing on developing trade relations, attracting foreign investment, and supporting its diaspora communities.

Uzbekistan’s diplomatic missions have also played a key role in advancing regional cooperation within organizations such as the Commonwealth of Independent States (CIS), the Shanghai Cooperation Organisation (SCO), and the Organization of Turkic States (OTS). The country maintains embassies and consulates in most of its neighboring countries, as well as in strategic locations across Asia, Europe, the Middle East, and North America.

In recent years, Uzbekistan has intensified its foreign policy efforts under President Shavkat Mirziyoyev, reopening and establishing new embassies and consulates in regions of growing importance to its economy and security.

== Current missions ==
=== Africa ===
Host country	Host city	Mission	Concurrent accreditation	Ref.
Egypt	Cairo	Embassy	Countries: Algeria	

=== Americas ===
Host country	Host city	Mission	Concurrent accreditation	Ref.
United States	Washington, D.C.	Embassy	Countries: Brazil; Canada; Multilateral Organizations: Organization of American States (Note: Accredited as an observer mission.)	
United States	New York City	Consulate-General	Countries: Brazil; Canada; Multilateral Organizations: Organization of American States	
United States	Seattle	Consulate-General	Countries: Brazil; Canada; Multilateral Organizations: Organization of American States	

=== Asia ===
Host country	Host city	Mission	Concurrent accreditation	Ref.
Afghanistan	Kabul	Embassy		
Afghanistan	Mazar-i-Sharif	Consulate-General		
Azerbaijan	Baku	Embassy	Countries: Georgia	
China	Beijing	Embassy	Countries: Mongolia; Philippines	
China	Guangzhou	Consulate-General	Countries: Mongolia; Philippines	
China	Shanghai	Consulate-General	Countries: Mongolia; Philippines	
India	New Delhi	Embassy	Countries: Bangladesh; Maldives	
Indonesia	Jakarta	Embassy	Countries: Vietnam; Multilateral Organizations: Association of Southeast Asian Nations	
Iran	Tehran	Embassy	Multilateral Organizations: Economic Cooperation Organization	
Israel	Tel Aviv	Embassy		
Japan	Tokyo	Embassy	Countries: Fiji	
Kazakhstan	Astana	Embassy		
Kazakhstan	Aktau	Consulate-General		
Kazakhstan	Almaty	Consulate-General		
Kuwait	Kuwait City	Embassy	Countries: Iraq; Syria	
Kyrgyzstan	Bishkek	Embassy		
Kyrgyzstan	Osh	Consulate-General		
Malaysia	Ampang (Note: The embassy is located outside Kuala Lumpur’s administrative borders and it’s located in the city of Ampang Jaya in Selangor state.)	Embassy	Countries: Brunei	
Oman	Muscat	Embassy	Countries: Kenya; Lebanon	
Pakistan	Islamabad	Embassy	Countries: Sri Lanka	
Qatar	Doha	Embassy	Countries: Ethiopia; South Africa; Multilateral Organizations: African Union	
Saudi Arabia	Riyadh	Embassy	Countries: Bahrain; Jordan; Multilateral Organizations: Organisation of Islamic Cooperation	
Saudi Arabia	Jeddah	Consulate-General	Countries: Bahrain; Jordan; Multilateral Organizations: Organisation of Islamic Cooperation	
Singapore	Singapore	Embassy	Countries: Australia; New Zealand	
South Korea	Seoul	Embassy		
Tajikistan	Dushanbe	Embassy		
Thailand	Bangkok	Consulate-General	Multilateral Organizations: UNESCAP	
Turkey	Ankara	Embassy	Countries: Bulgaria	
Turkey	Istanbul	Consulate-General	Countries: Bulgaria	
Turkmenistan	Ashgabad	Embassy		
United Arab Emirates	Abu Dhabi	Embassy		
United Arab Emirates	Dubai	Consulate-General		

=== Europe ===
Host country	Host city	Mission	Concurrent accreditation	Ref.
Austria	Vienna	Embassy	Countries: Albania; Bosnia and Herzegovina; Slovakia; Multilateral Organizations: United Nations; CTBTO Preparatory Commission; International Atomic Energy Agency; OSCE; United Nations Industrial Development Organization; United Nations Office on Drugs and Crime	
Belarus	Minsk	Embassy		
Belgium	Brussels	Embassy	Countries: Luxembourg; Netherlands; Multilateral Organizations: European Union; NATO; Organisation for the Prohibition of Chemical Weapons	
Czechia	Prague	Embassy		
France	Paris	Embassy	Countries: Monaco; Portugal	
Germany	Berlin	Embassy	Countries: Liechtenstein; Switzerland	
Germany	Frankfurt	Consulate-General	Countries: Liechtenstein; Switzerland	
Hungary	Budapest	Embassy	Countries: Croatia; Montenegro; Serbia; Slovenia	
Italy	Rome	Embassy	Countries: Cyprus; Greece; Malta; San Marino; Multilateral Organizations: Food and Agriculture Organization; International Fund for Agricultural Development; World Food Programme	
Latvia	Riga	Embassy	Countries: Estonia; Finland; Lithuania	
Poland	Warsaw	Embassy	Countries: Romania	
Russia	Moscow	Embassy	Countries: Armenia	
Russia	Kazan	Consulate-General	Countries: Armenia	
Russia	Novosibirsk	Consulate-General	Countries: Armenia	
Russia	Rostov-on-Don	Consulate-General	Countries: Armenia	
Russia	Saint Petersburg	Consulate-General	Countries: Armenia	
Russia	Vladivostok	Consulate-General	Countries: Armenia	
Russia	Yekaterinburg	Consulate-General	Countries: Armenia	
Spain	Madrid	Embassy	Countries: Andorra; Holy See; Multilateral Organizations: UN Tourism	
Sweden	Stockholm	Embassy	Countries: Norway	
Ukraine	Kyiv	Embassy	Countries: Moldova	
United Kingdom	London	Embassy	Countries: Iceland; Ireland	

=== International organizations ===
Organization	Host city	Host country	Mission	Concurrent accreditation	Ref.
Shanghai Cooperation Organization	Beijing	China	Permanent Mission		
United Nations	New York City	United States	Permanent Mission	Countries: Cuba; Guatemala	
United Nations	Geneva	Switzerland	Permanent Mission		
UNESCO	Paris	France	Permanent Mission		

== Gallery ==
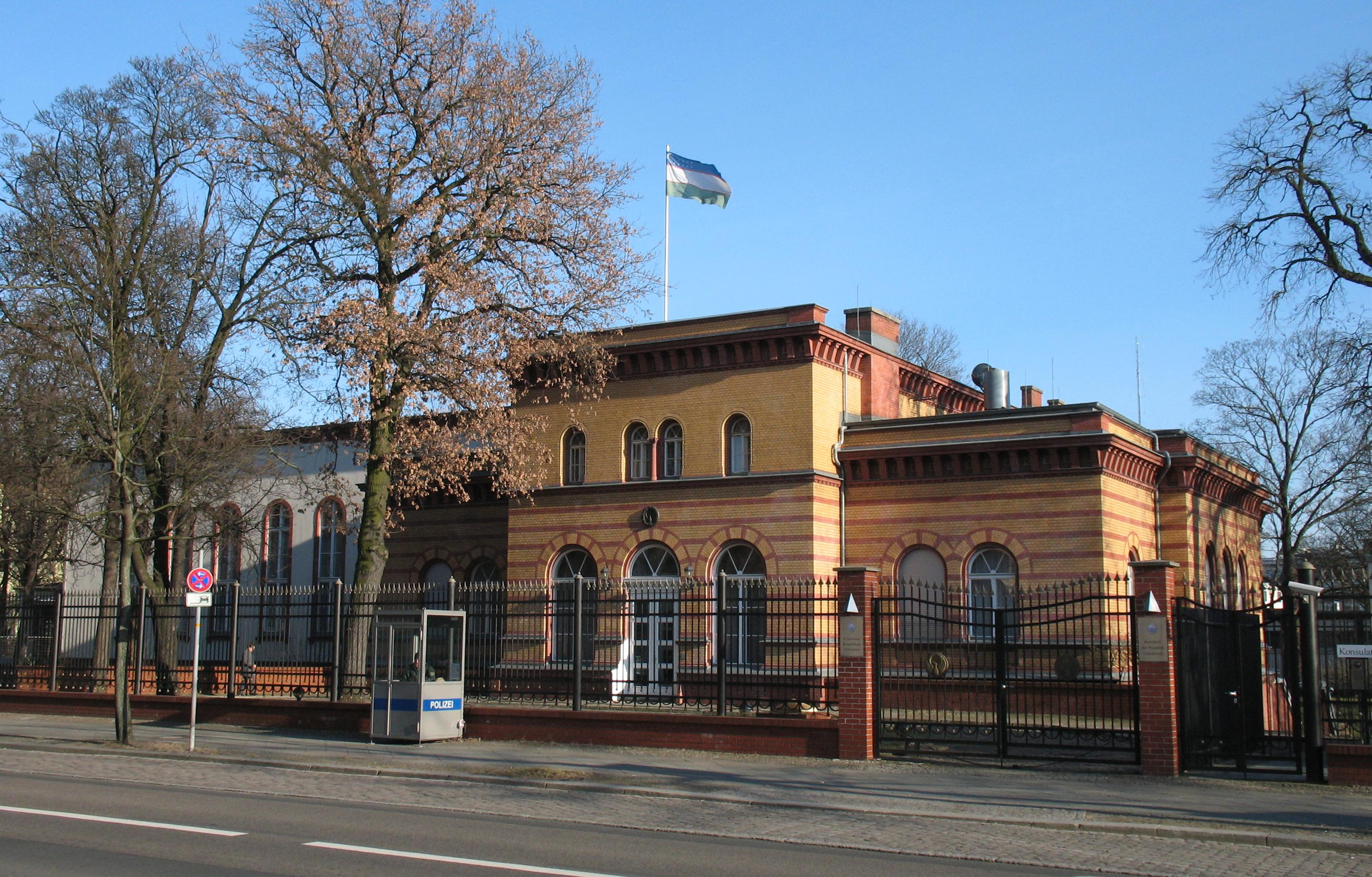
Embassy in Berlin

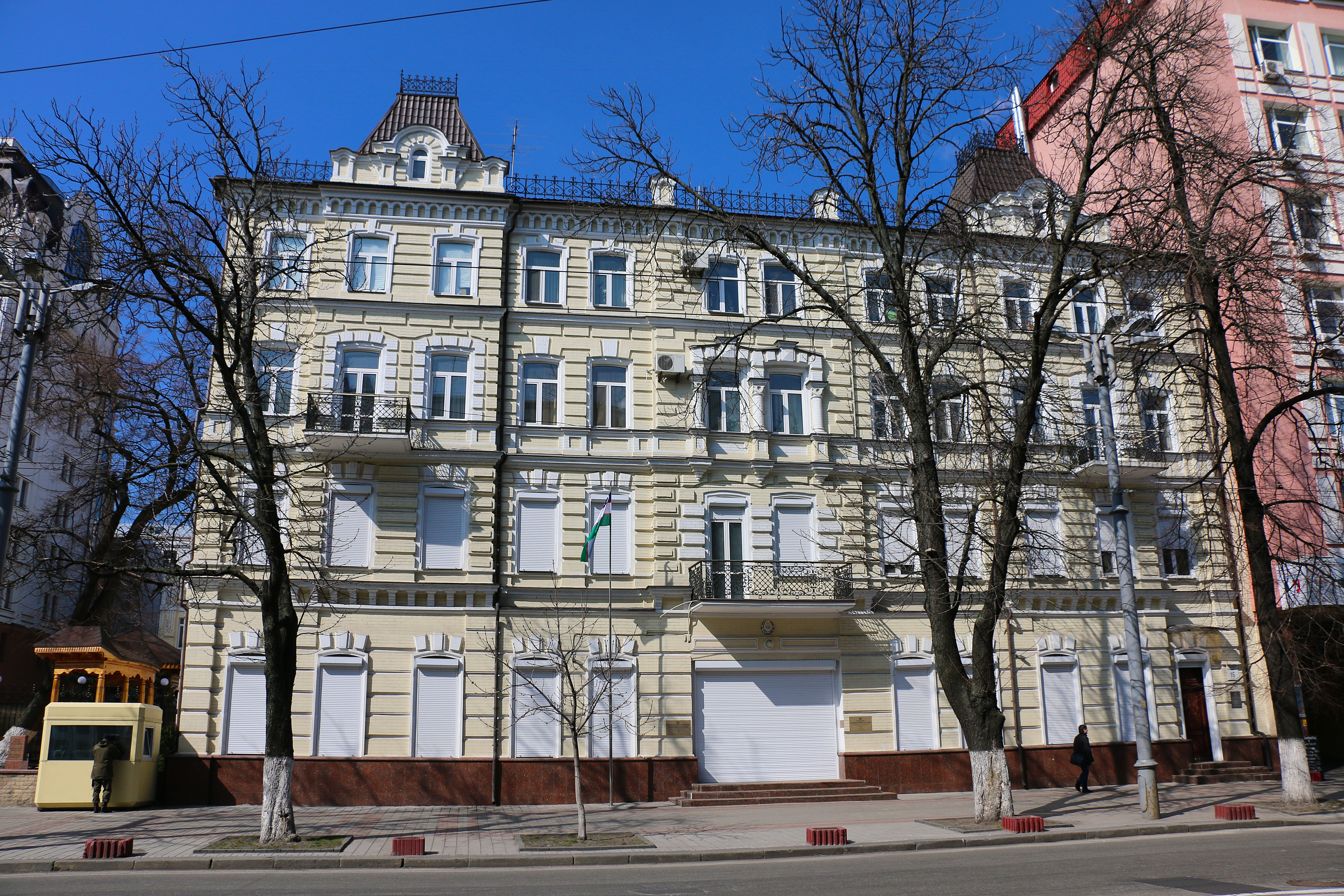
Embassy in Kyiv

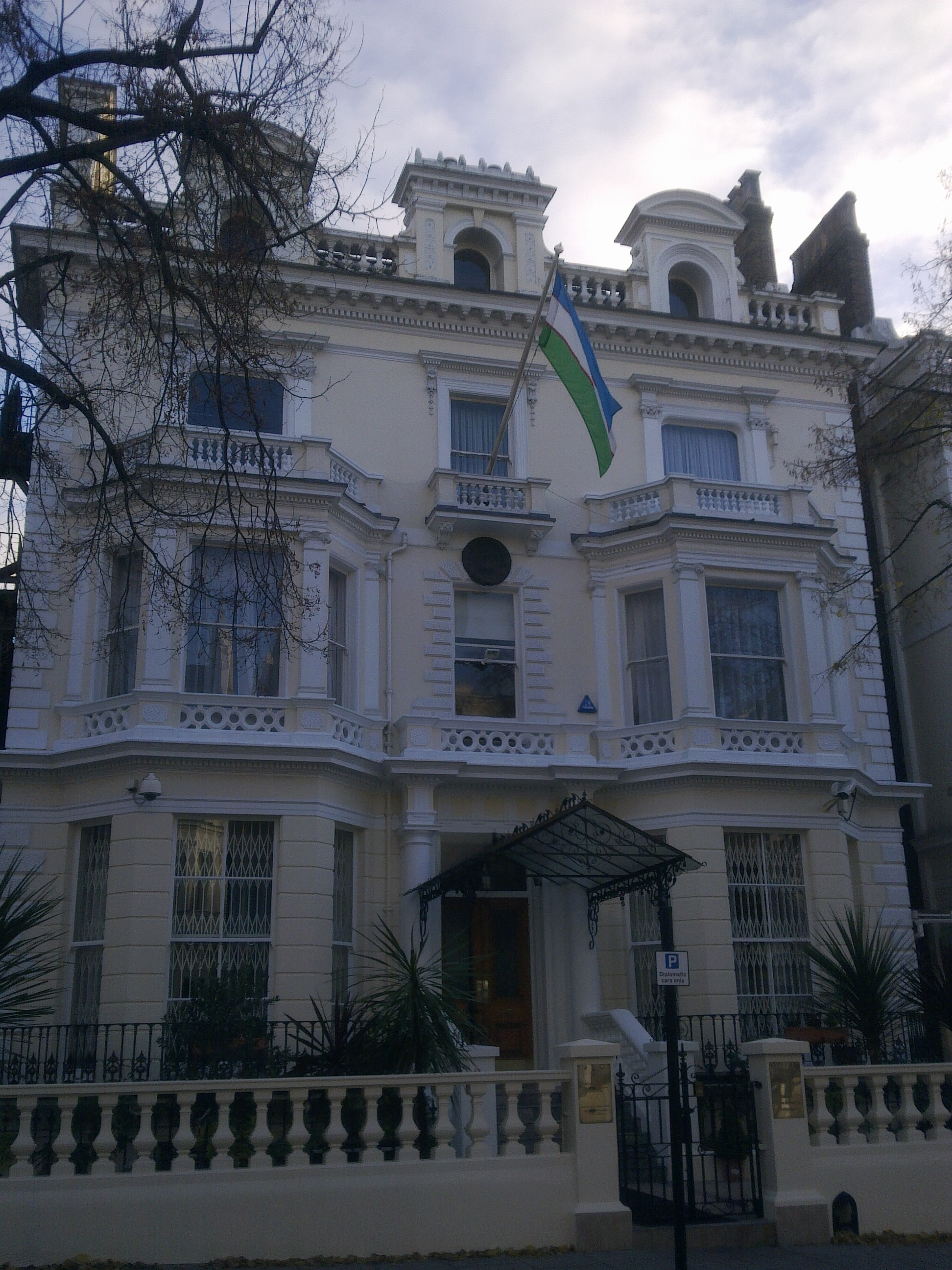
Embassy in London

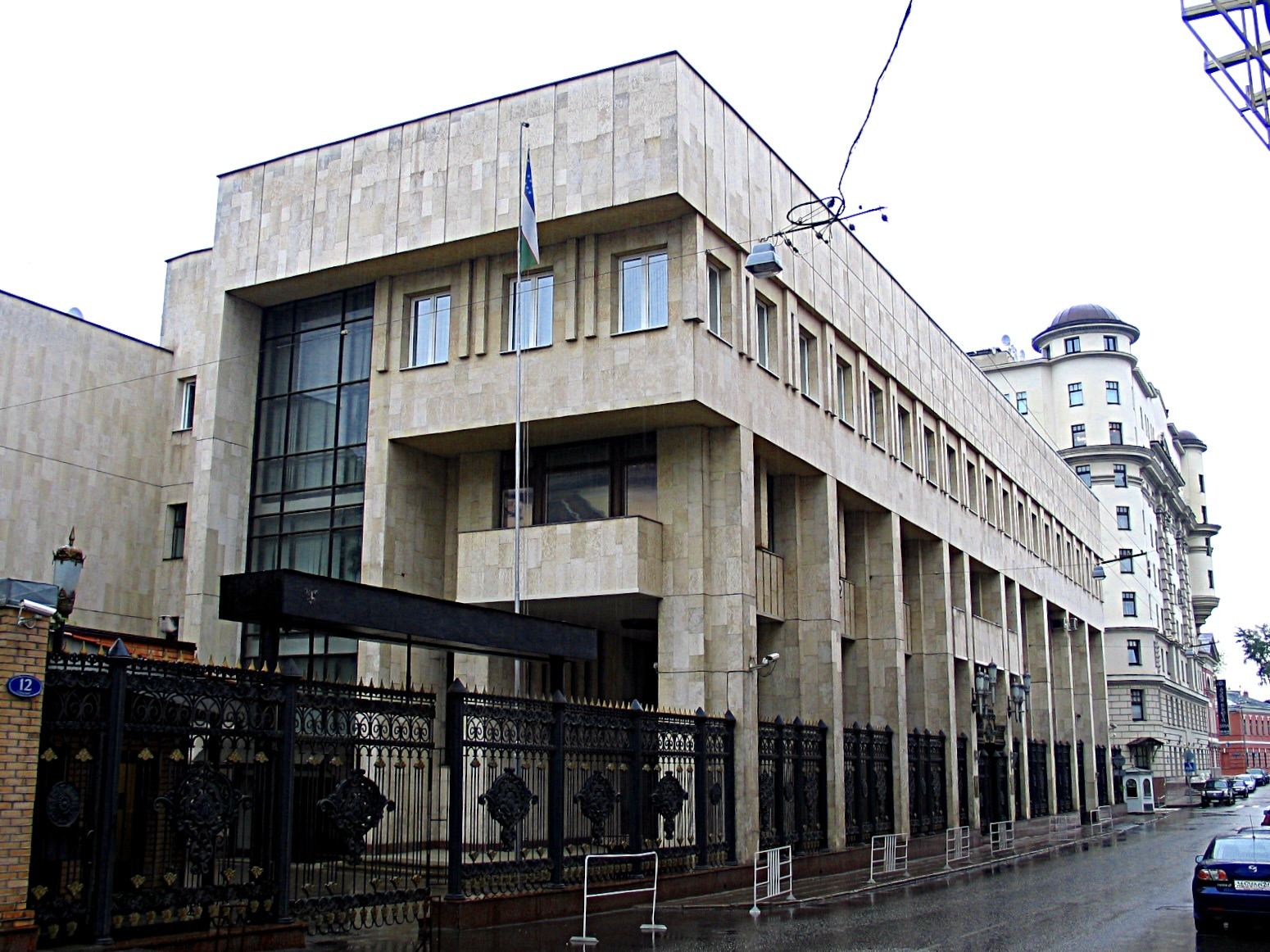
Embassy in Moscow

Consulate-General in Saint Petersburg

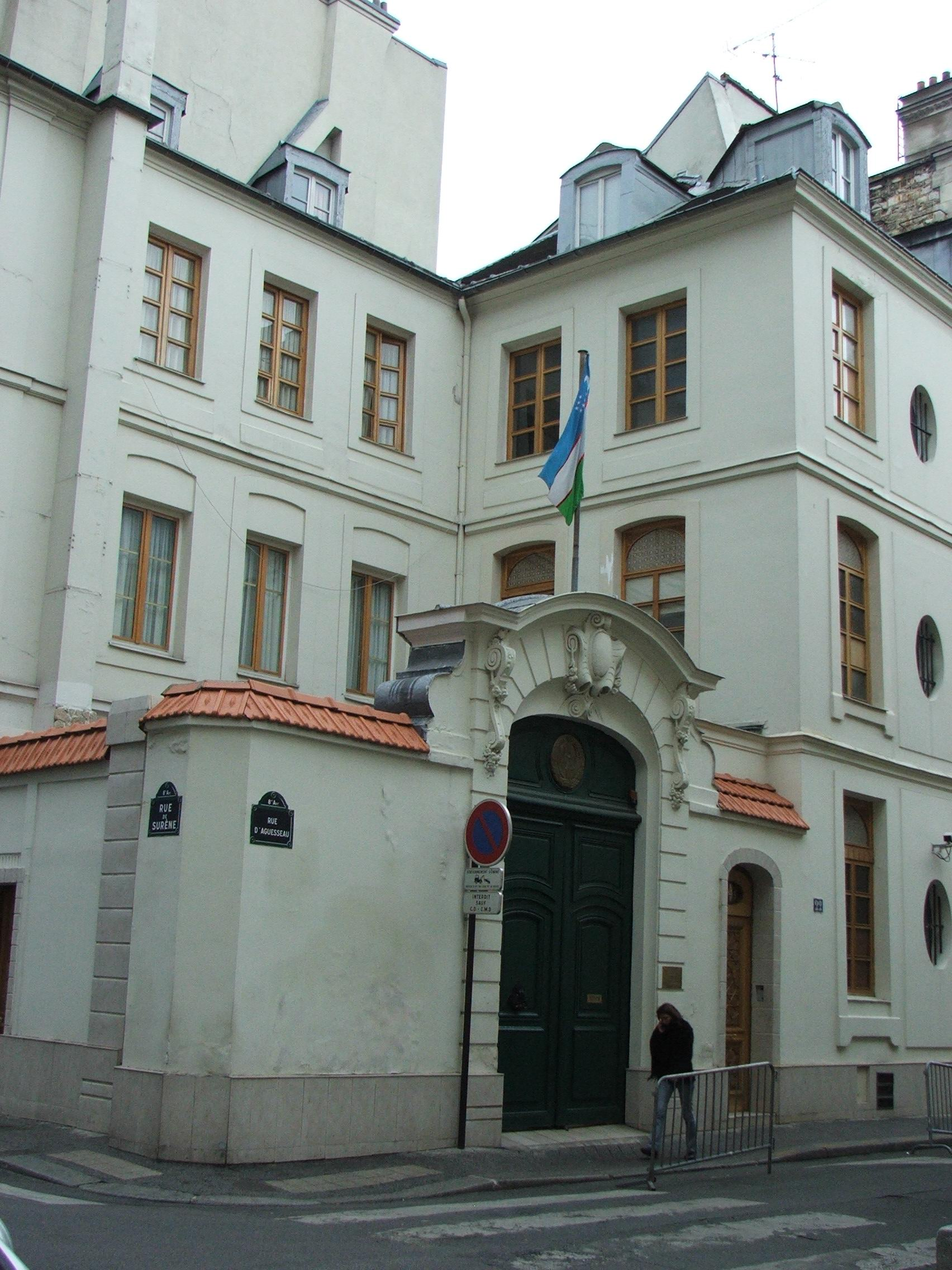
Embassy in Paris

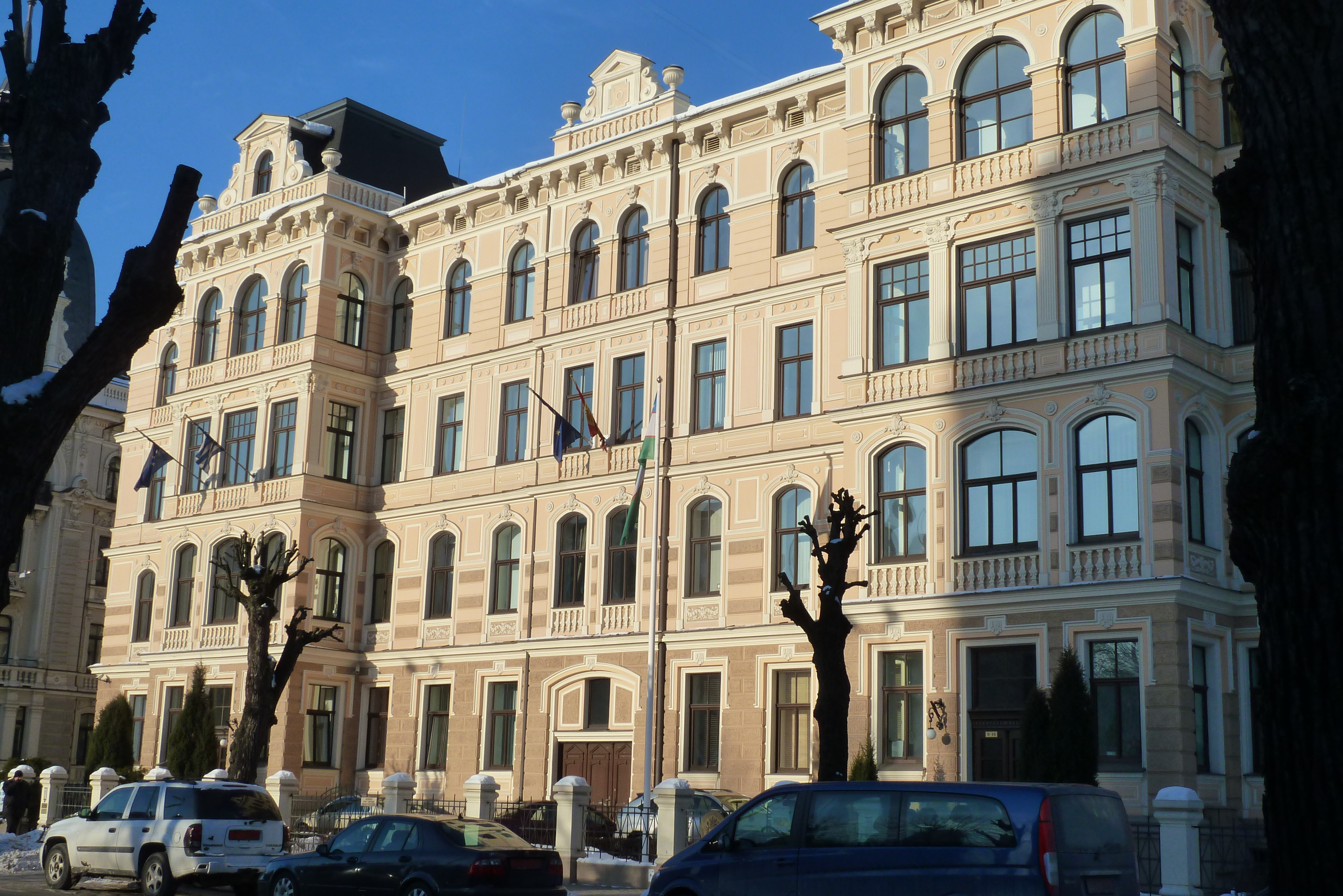
Embassy in Riga

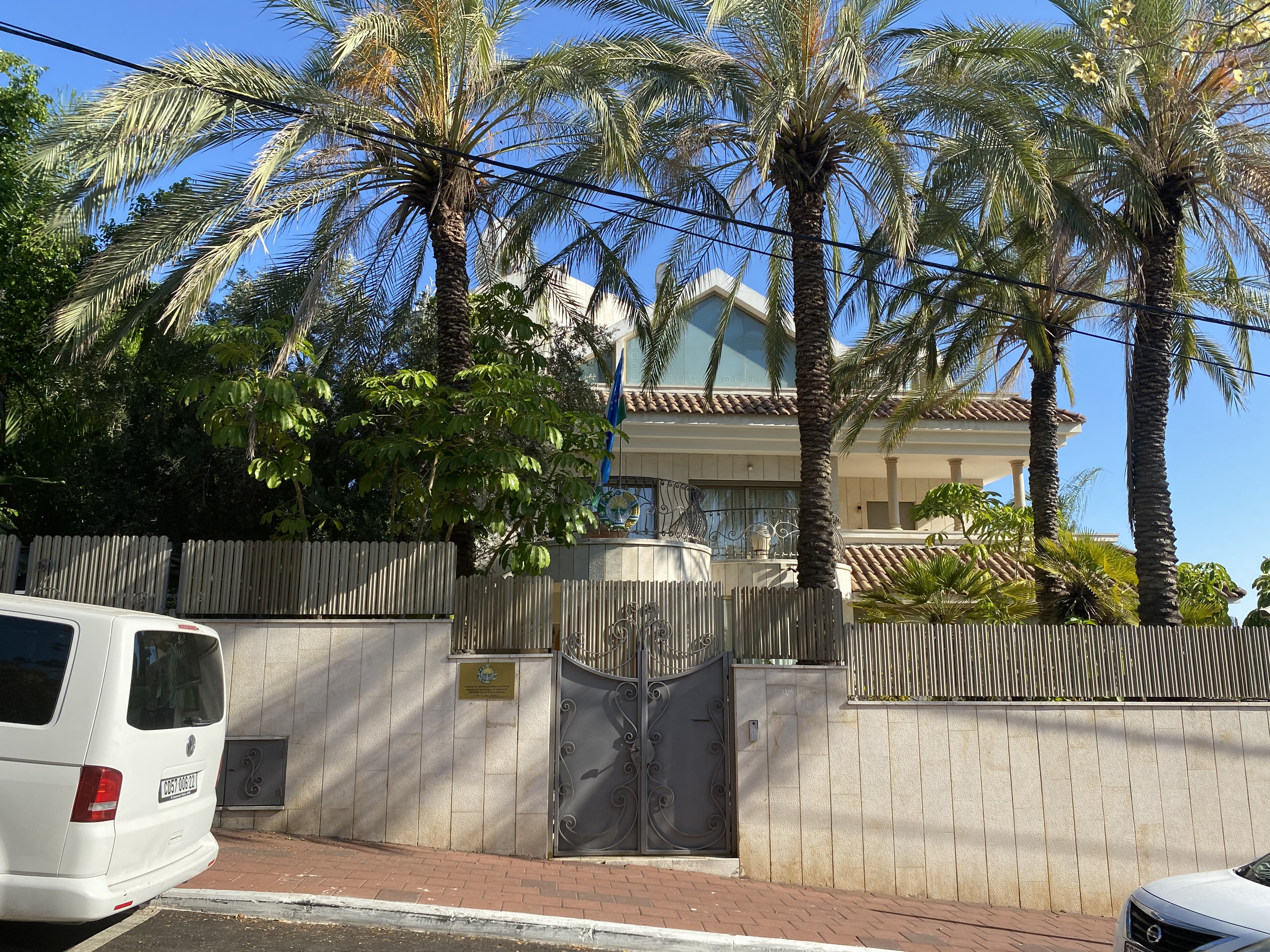
Embassy in Tel Aviv

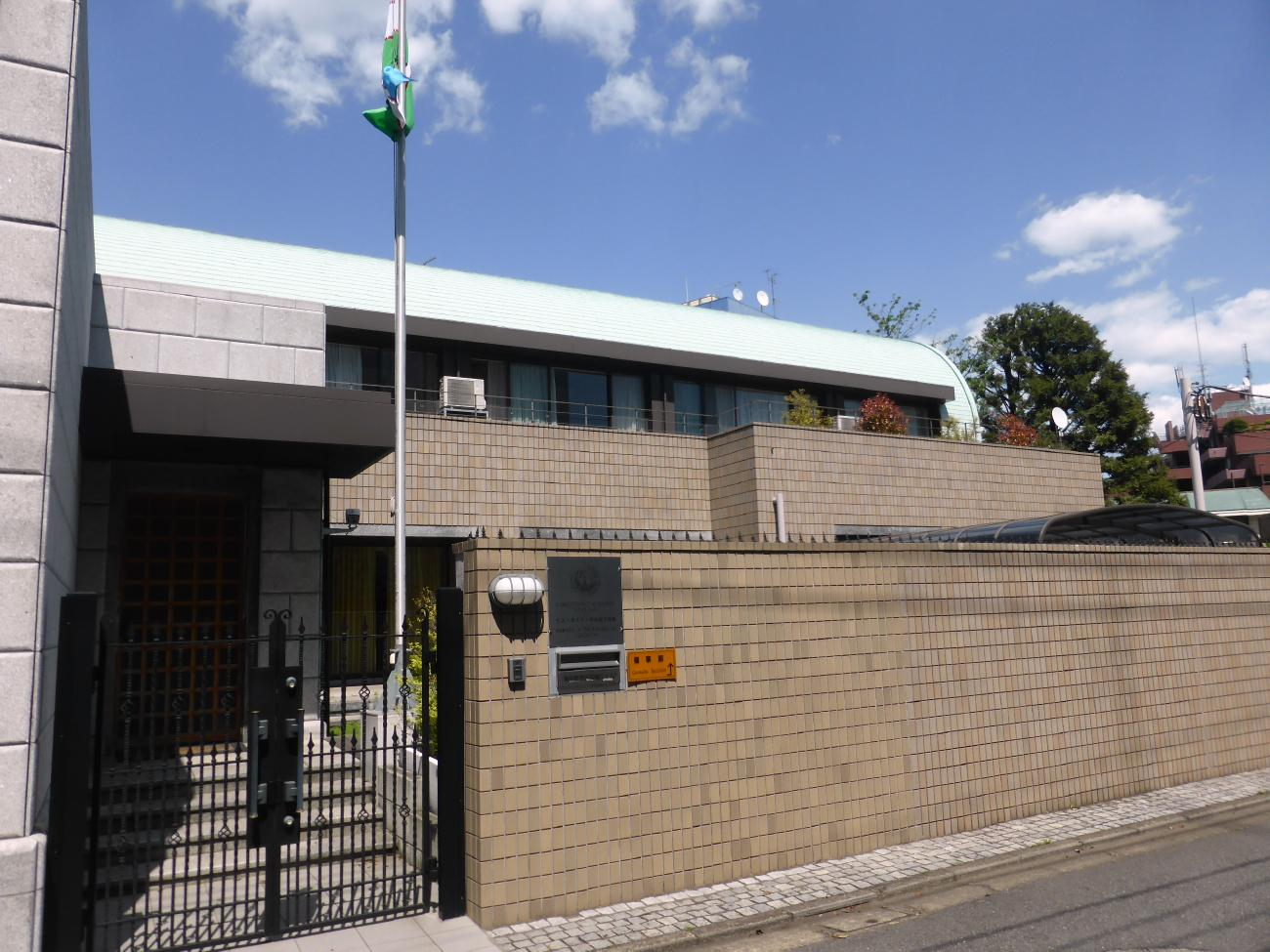
Embassy in Tokyo

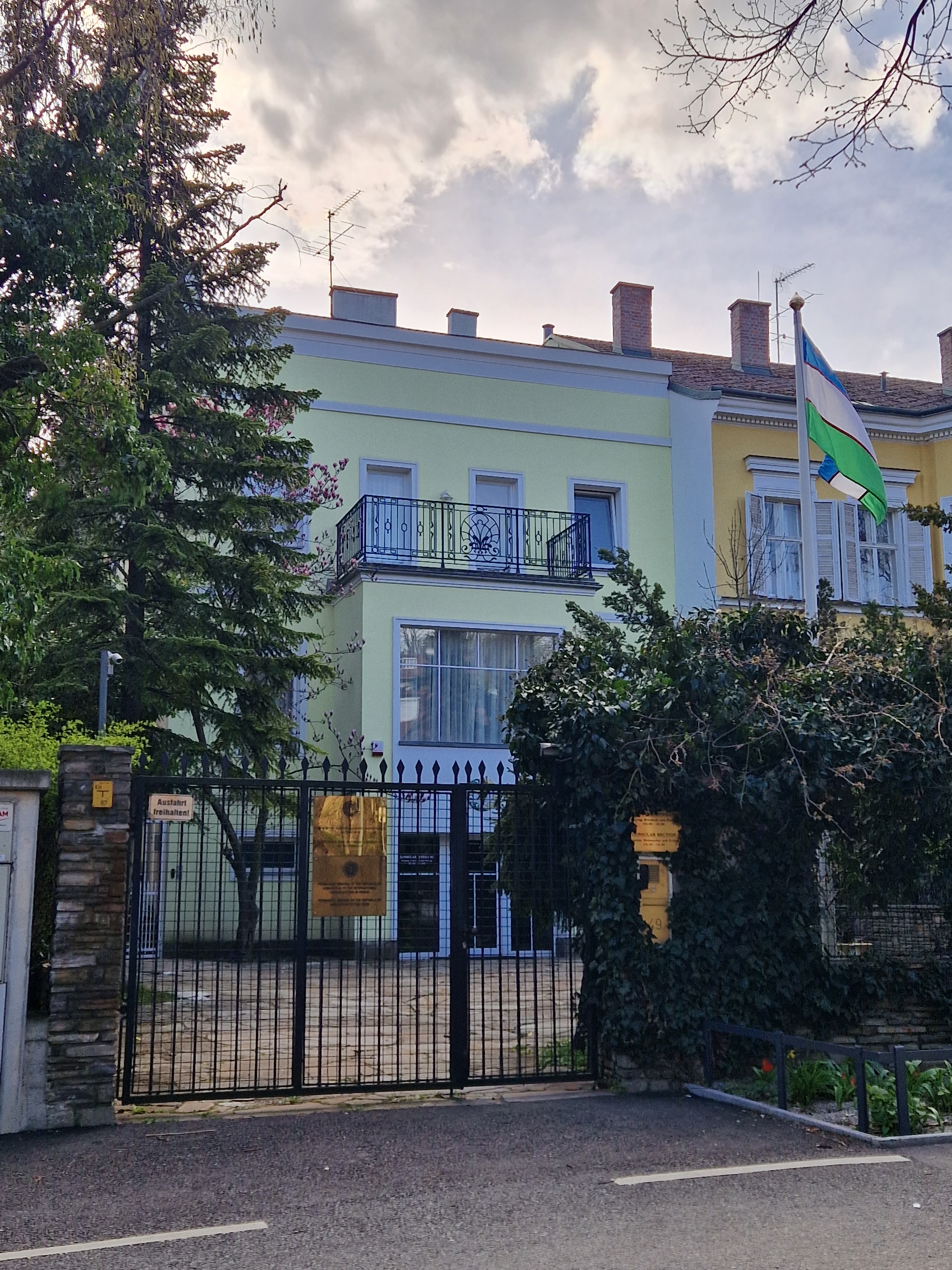
Embassy in Vienna

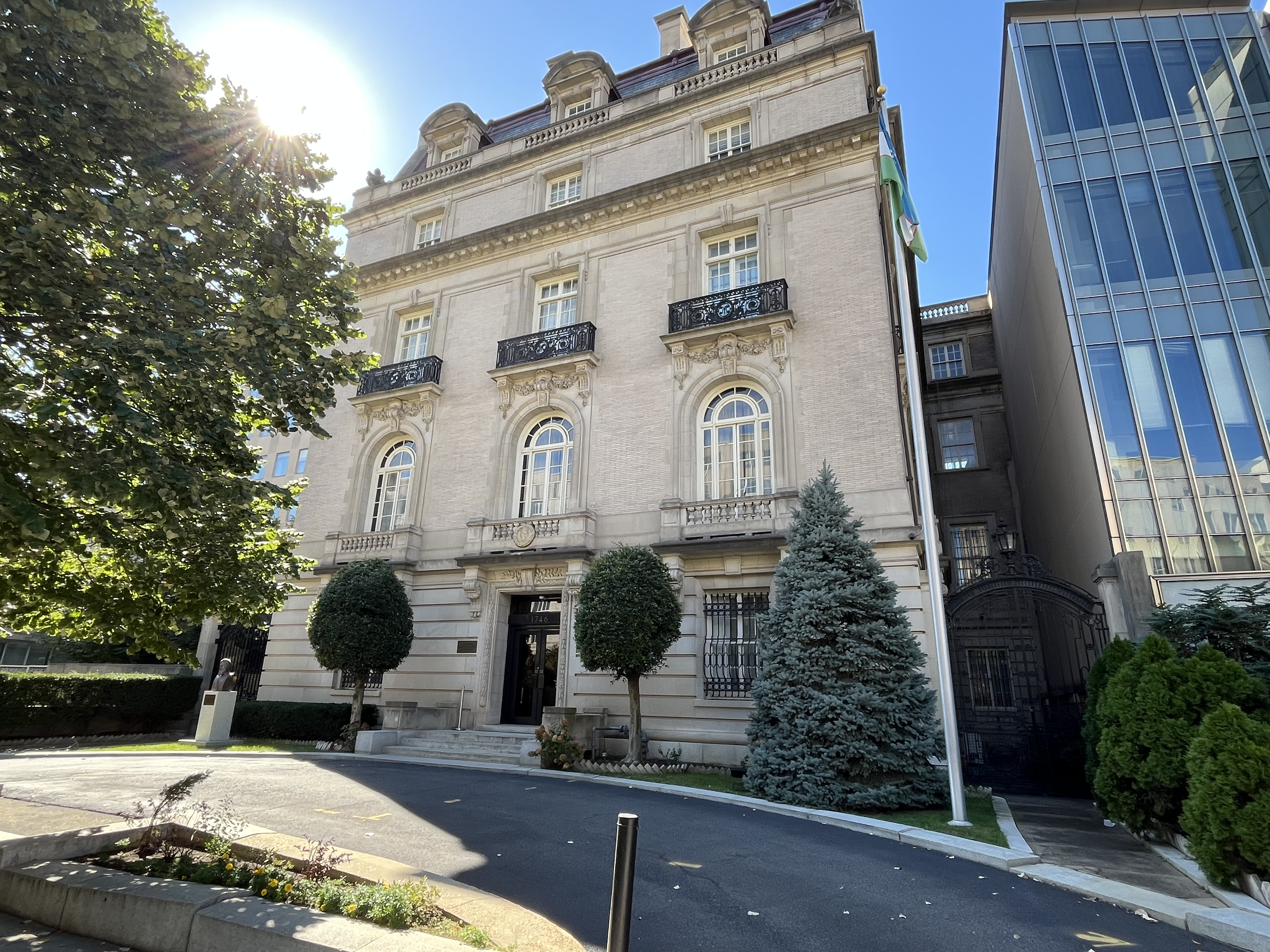
Embassy in Washington, D.C.

== Closed Missions ==
Host country	Host city	Mission	Year Closed	Ref.
Bangladesh	Dhaka	Consulate General		
Greece	Athens	Consulate General	2021	
Netherlands	Amsterdam	Consulate General	2005	
Pakistan	Karachi	Consulate General		
Russian Empire	Orenburg	Embassy (Note: Now relocated to Moscow.)	1920	

== Missions to open ==
Host country	Host city	Mission	Ref.
Brazil	Brasília	Embassy	
Canada	Toronto	Consulate General	
Georgia	Tbilisi	Embassy	
Kazakhstan	Shymkent	Consulate General	
South Korea	Busan	Consulate General	
Russia	Astrakhan	Consulate General	
Russia	Kaliningrad	Consulate General	
Russia	Nizhny Novgorod	Consulate General	
Russia	Samara	Consulate General	
Russia	Tula	Consulate General	
United States	Chicago	Consulate General	
United States	Orlando	Consulate General	
United States	Philadelphia	Consulate General	
United States	San Francisco	Consulate General	
World Trade Organization	Geneva	Permanent Mission	

== See also ==
- Foreign relations of Uzbekistan
- List of diplomatic missions in Uzbekistan
- Visa policy of Uzbekistan
