= Norway–Uzbekistan relations =

- Norway: Uzbekistan

Norway–Uzbekistan relations refer to the bilateral relations between Norway and Uzbekistan. Norway established diplomatic ties and recognized the independence of Uzbekistan on June 10, 1992. Norway is accredited to Uzbekistan through its embassy in Moscow. Uzbekistan is accredited to Norway through its embassy in Stockholm.

== History ==
On June 18–20, 2019, an Uzbek delegation visited Oslo.

In June 2020, Uzbek Deputy Foreign Minister, Sherzod Asadov, discussed online with Norwegian State Secretary for Foreign Affairs, Audun Halvorsen, where the two discussed international security and bilateral cooperation. Asadov states that Norway would make an impact on UNSC by addressing international peace and security.

In June 2026, the Norwegian Radiation and Nuclear Safety Authority travelled to Tashkent and launched a 3-year nuclear and radiation safety regulatory partnership.

In July 2026, Norwegian State Secretary of the Ministry of Foreign Affairs, Eivind Vad Petersson, met with Uzbek Deputy Minister of Foreign Affairs, Muzaffar Madrakhimov. The two nations discussed expanding trade and investment cooperation.

== High-level visits ==
High level visits from Norway to Uzbekistan

- Eivind Vad Petersson (July 2026)

High level visits from Uzbekistan to Norway

== See Also ==
- Foreign relations of Norway
- Foreign relations of Uzbekistan
