= United Kingdom–Uzbekistan relations =

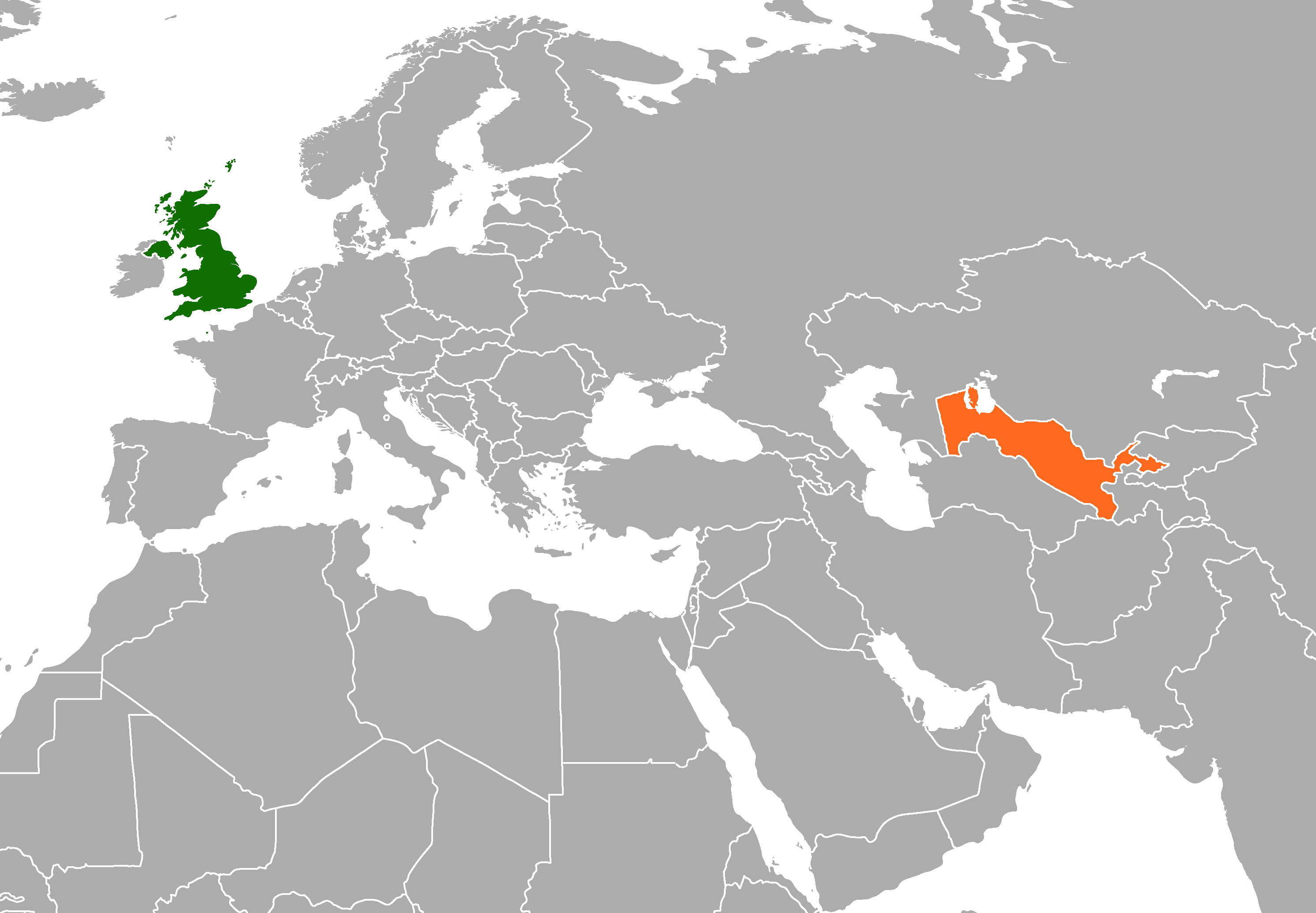

- United Kingdom: Uzbekistan

United Kingdom–Uzbekistan relations are the bilateral and diplomatic relations relations between these two countries.

== History ==
Correspondence existed between King Henry IV of England and Amir Temur dating back to 1402. Both nations formally established diplomatic relations on 18 February 1992, soon after the dissolution of the Soviet Union.

In February 2017, both nations celebrated 25 years of diplomatic relations.

== Resident diplomatic missions ==
- United Kingdom has an embassy in Tashkent.
- Uzbekistan has an embassy in London.
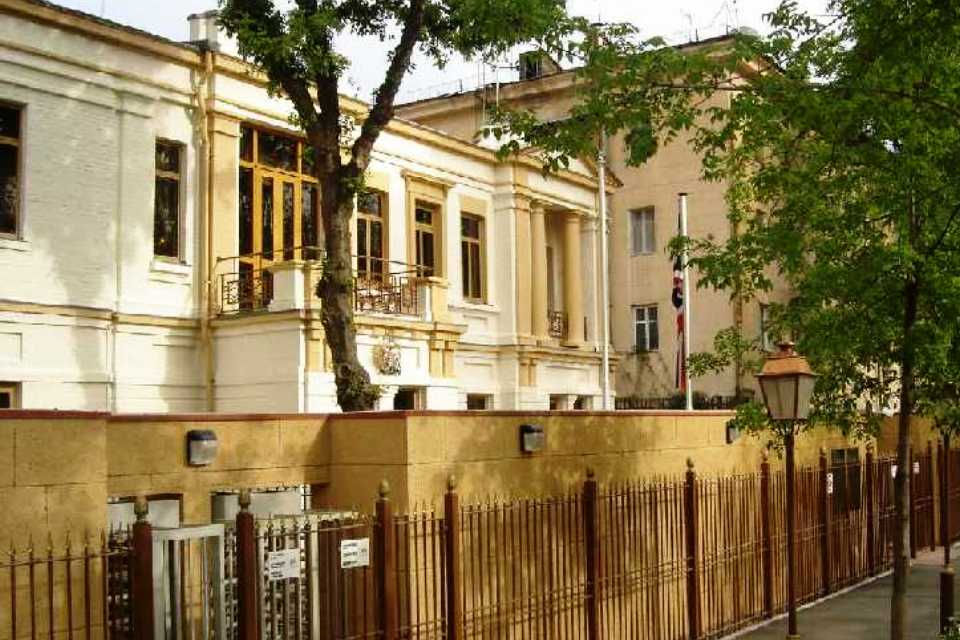
Embassy of the United Kingdom in Tashkent

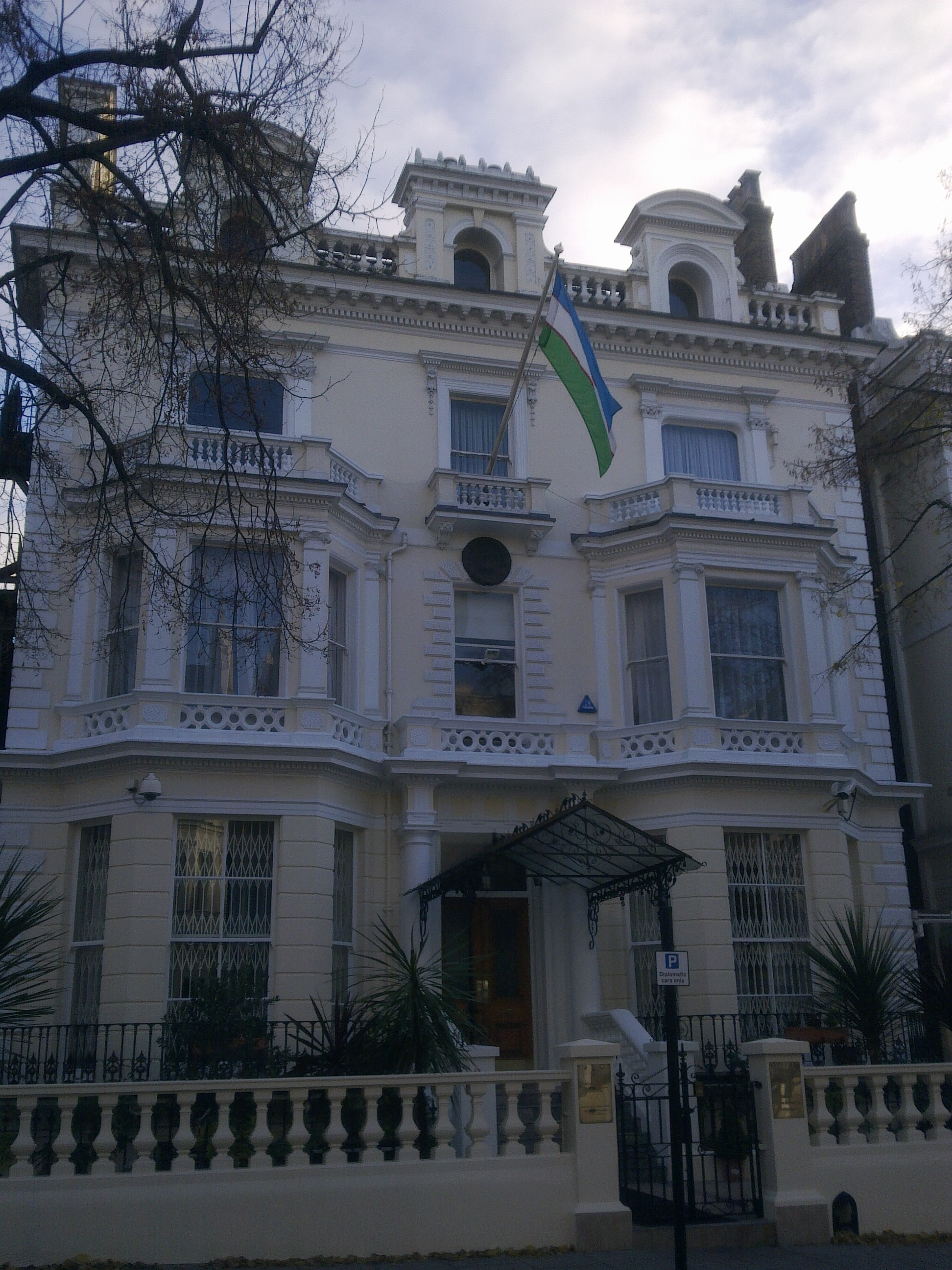
Embassy of Uzbekistan in London

== See also ==
- List of Ambassadors of the United Kingdom to Uzbekistan
- List of diplomatic missions in Uzbekistan
