= Indonesia–Uzbekistan relations =

- Indonesia: Uzbekistan

Indonesia–Uzbekistan relations was officially established on 23 June 1992. Both countries have recognized importance of each other's potential; Uzbekistan realized the strategic importance of Indonesia, home to the world's biggest Muslim population and Southeast Asia’s biggest economy, while Indonesia recognize Uzbekistan strategic importance as the gate to Central Asia, a growing economy also a potential market. Indonesia has an embassy in Tashkent, while Uzbekistan has an embassy in Jakarta. Both countries have Muslim-majority population and both are members of Organisation of Islamic Cooperation as well as the Asia Cooperation Dialogue and Non-Aligned Movement.

== History ==
The Indonesian–Uzbekistan historic relations was started earlier, prior to the independence of Uzbekistan. In 1961, Indonesian President Sukarno has visited the tomb of Imam Bukhari in Samarkand. This special request was made by Sukarno to Nikita Khrushchev during his official visit to the Soviet Union.

On 28 December 1991, Indonesia has recognized the independence of the Republic of Uzbekistan from the dissolved Soviet Union. Diplomatic relations were established on 23 June 1992, signed by Uzbekistan President Islam Karimov during his official visit to Indonesia. In April 1995, Indonesian President Suharto visited Uzbekistan. Indonesia opened its embassy in Tashkent in May 1994, and Uzbekistan reciprocated two years later by opening its embassy in Jakarta in December 1996.

== Economic relations ==
The bilateral trade between Indonesia and Uzbekistan is in the US$10–30 million range. It was US$28.27 million in 2007 and US$13.75 million in 2008. Uzbekistan export to Indonesia consists of services, electrical equipment, cotton, wool and felt. While Indonesian export to Uzbekistan includes cocoa, tea, tobacco, animal and vegetable oil, rubber tire, tire cases, cotton fabrics, woven tulle, lace, embroidery, ribbon, trimmings and other small wares.

== Culture ==
In 2001, the Center for Indonesian Study of was established in Samarkand, that annually trained more than 20 students. Indonesian language and culture is also taught in Samarkand State Institute of World Languages. The cultural exchanges between two nations often took place to promote closer relations. On May 1, 2013, The Indonesia-Uzbekistan Cultural Performance was staged in Conservatory Hall of Tashkent, featuring Indonesian dances performed by Uzbek dancers and also musical performance of Surya Vista Orchestra that played Indonesian and Uzbekistan songs.

== Resident diplomatic missions ==
- Indonesia has an embassy in Tashkent.
- Uzbekistan has an embassy in Jakarta.

== See also ==
- Foreign relations of Indonesia
- Foreign relations of Uzbekistan
