= Armenia–Uzbekistan relations =

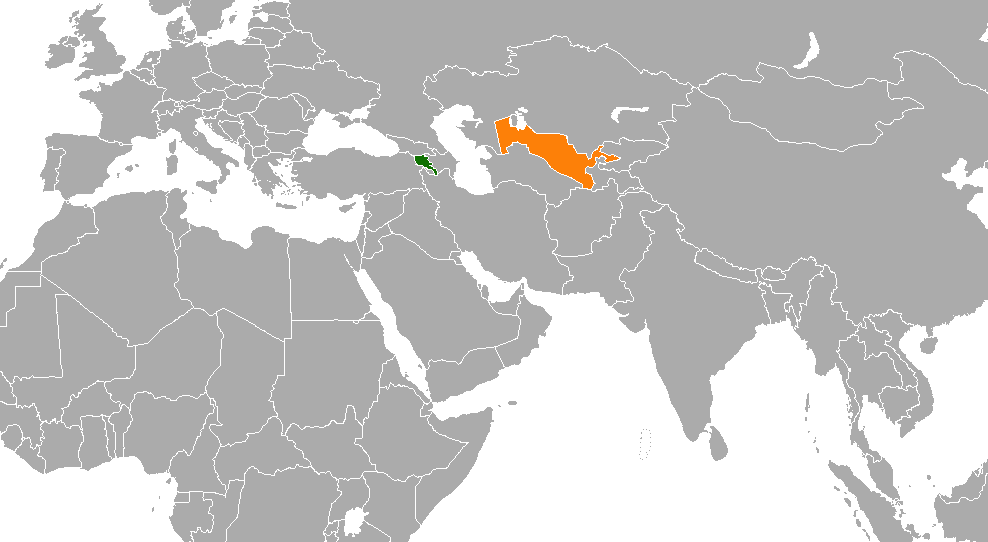

- Armenia: Uzbekistan

Armenia and Uzbekistan enjoy relatively strong relations, which is sometimes viewed to be among the wealthiest relationships between Armenia and a Turkic state. Both embassies of the two nations are accredited in Moscow.

== History ==
Armenians have a long presence in Central Asia since antiquity, in which Armenians, mostly traders, established trade and economic links with the Turks of Central Asia. It would have continued with little interruption, despite Armenia falling into the hands of the Byzantine Empire, Safavid dynasty and to the later Russian Empire, although it declined in the 19th century.

Armenian and Russian research materials indicate that in 1890 more than 4,000 Armenians lived in Central Asia, many in what is today's Uzbekistan and its neighboring countries. This figure climbed to 5,000 in 1897 and to more than 25,000 in 1917, according to the same sources. The main Armenian communities were in the Uzbek cities of Bukhara, Khiva, Andijan, Kokand and Tashkent.

Armenian immigrants moved in large number to the Central Asian region, especially during the World War I which occurred the Armenian genocide. As part of Tsarist Russia and later Soviet Union, ethnic Armenians were trusted to ongoing immigration to the region, and Armenian immigration also met with little resistance from local Uzbeks. Uzbeks and Armenians were able to get along well until the rise of ethnic nationalism at 1990s that saw clashes between Armenians and Muslim peoples, mainly Tajiks but also a minority of Uzbeks, which ended deadly.

However, with the erupt of Tajikistani Civil War, newly independent Uzbekistan tolerated and encouraged Armenians fighting against Tajik-backed forces in the war, mostly Islamists. Consequently, Uzbekistan had its own Armenian militias fighting on the side of Tashkent, and for its efforts, soon became recognized among Uzbek citizens.

== Today ==
Owned by this closeness, Armenia and Uzbekistan established official tie following the fall of USSR. This close relations was followed by Uzbekistan's embracing Armenian ethnic minority within the country, with its Armenian minority holds annual festivals in the country. Uzbekistan is home to the largest and oldest Armenian community in Central Asia. Between 40,000 and 70,000 Armenians live there at present. There are several Armenian Churches in Uzbekistan, both are well-perceived by the host nation.

On 11 October 2019, Armenia's Prime Minister Nikol Pashinyan and Uzbekistan's President Shavkat Mirziyoyev met for first-ever official negotiations between the two countries. An Armenian government statement subsequently said that Mirziyoyev and Pashinian agreed to expand relations between their nations. In that regard, Mirziyoyev proposed the creation of an Uzbek-Armenian intergovernmental commission on economic cooperation.

=== Nagorno-Karabakh conflict ===
In 2018, Uzbekistan's ambassador to Azerbaijan told that Uzbekistan under Islam Karimov had refused to establish diplomatic relations with Armenia until a final settlement of the conflict and has always consistently supported Azerbaijan on international arena.

In 2020, Turkic Council, Uzbekistan as member state, condemned the 2020 Ganja missile attacks.

== Resident diplomatic missions ==
- Armenia is accredited to Uzbekistan through a non-resident ambassador based in Yerevan.
- Uzbekistan is accredited to Armenia from its embassy in Moscow, Russia.

== See also ==
- Foreign relations of Armenia
- Foreign relations of Uzbekistan
- Armenians in Central Asia
