= Spain–Uzbekistan relations =

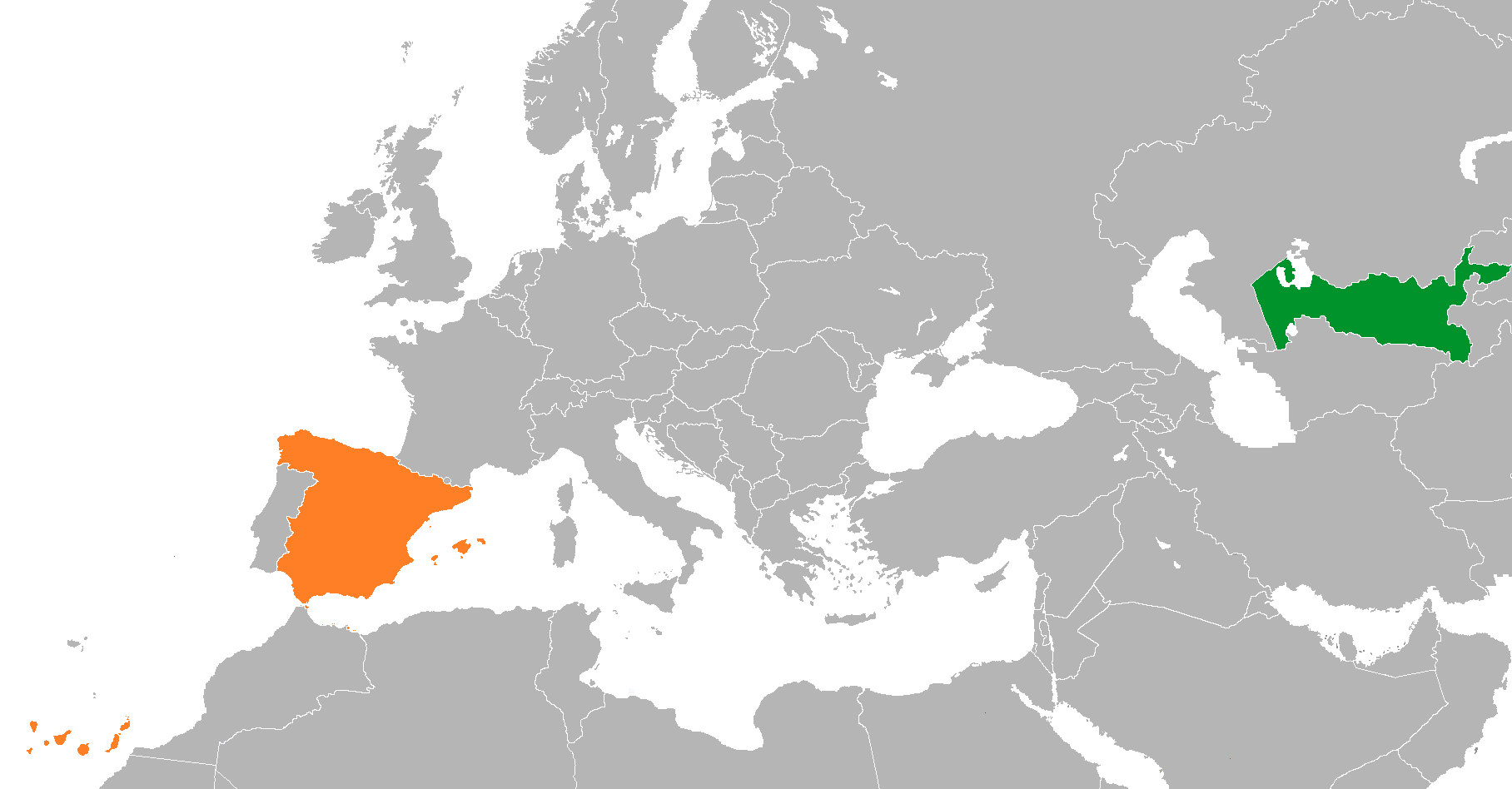

- Spain: Uzbekistan

Spain–Uzbekistan relations are the bilateral and diplomatic relations between these two countries. Uzbekistan has an embassy in Madrid and honorary consulates in Madrid and Barcelona. The Spanish embassy in Moscow, Russia is also accredited for Uzbekistan. The Uzbek ambassador, Rakhmatulla Nurimbetov, declared that relations between the two countries have a "great potential not used", especially in agricultural, tourism and scientific matters, so he has invited the Spanish businessmen to "invest and contribute to the development of the country", such as companies Talgo and Marsans, and has expressed his desire that Spain open an embassy in Tashkent "In the near future".

== History ==
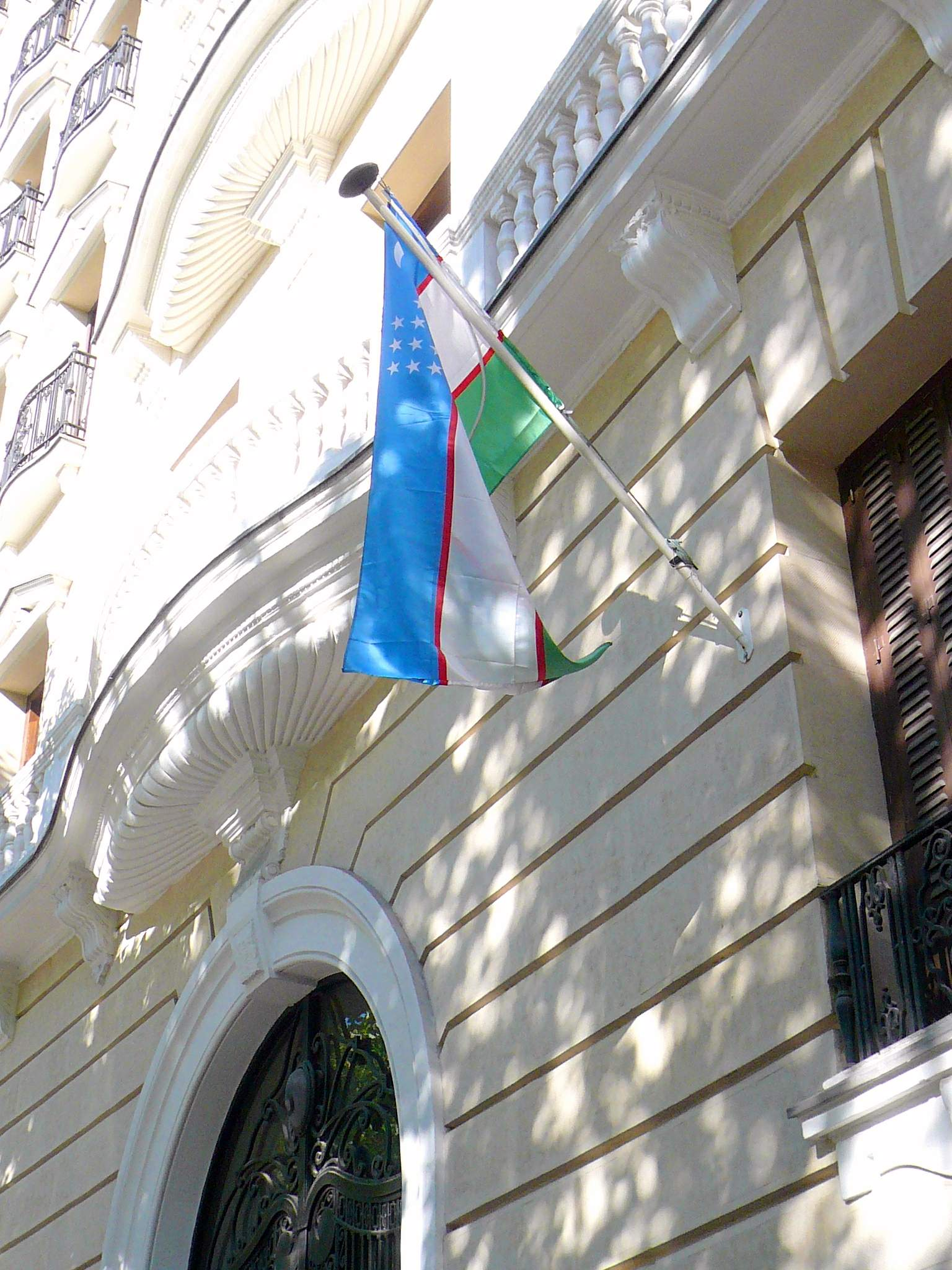
Embassy of Uzbekistan in Madrid

=== Precedents ===
The Embassy of Ruy González de Clavijo at the beginning of the 15th century to Samarkand, capital of the Emir Timur empire, better known in the West as Tamerlane (which in Persian means, contemptuously, "Timur the Lame"), represents a historical milestone of relations between Spain and Uzbekistan that is still referred to in bilateral contacts.

== Diplomatic relations ==
Spain recognized Uzbekistan on 31 December 1991. Both countries established diplomatic relations on 18 March 1992. Since September 1992, Spain has had its Moscow ambassador accredited in Uzbekistan. Uzbekistan had its ambassador in Paris accredited in Madrid from 1999 to 2007.

In January 2003 an official visit of President Karimov to Spain took place. He held meetings with the King and the President of the Government. The visit had little political and economic significance for bilateral relations. A Memorandum of Consultation was signed between the Ministries of Foreign Affairs, and a Memorandum of Cooperation between the University of Alcalá and the Ministry of Higher and Secondary Education of Uzbekistan.

In 2003, an Agreement for the Promotion and Reciprocal Protection of Investments entered into force.

In 2007, Uzbekistan opened an embassy in Spain.

== Economic relations ==
Bilateral trade is scarce and advances based on specific operations. However, in the years 2010-2011 there was a strong increase.

== Cooperation ==
To date, only two Spanish operations have had FAD financing. One for the construction of maternity clinics. Another for the collection and pumping of drinking water for the city of Bukhara, which was financed with a mixed loan (8.1 million euros from the FAD in 2002). Both projects were completed.

In Uzbekistan there is interest in the Spanish language and culture. Some 25,000 schoolchildren distributed in more than 100 high schools across the country They study Spanish as a second foreign language. Tashkent State University has a Spanish department, composed of 20 professors and about 300 students. For the 2013-2014 cycle, there is an AECID reader at the University of World Languages of Tashkent.

Uzbek students regularly study in Spain, thanks to scholarships from the MAEC-AECID programs or Erasmus Mundus and Tempus Europeans.

== Resident diplomatic missions ==
- Spain is accredited to Uzbekistan from its embassy in Moscow, Russia.
- Uzbekistan has an embassy in Madrid.

== See also ==
- Foreign relations of Spain
- Foreign relations of Uzbekistan

== Bibliography ==
- Alonso, Antonio (2011). "La política exterior de España hacia Asia Central (2000-2011)". UNISCI Discussion Papers (27). Madrid: Ediciones Complutense. doi:10.5209/rev_UNIS.2011.v27.38148. ISSN 1696-2206.
