= Ukraine–Uzbekistan relations =

- Ukraine: Uzbekistan

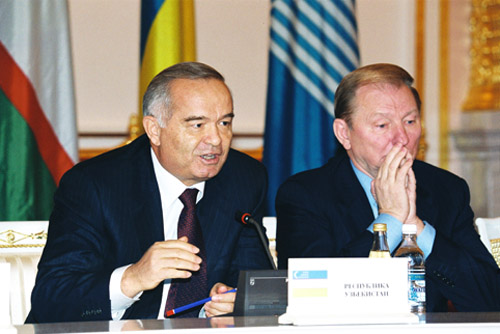
Islam Karimov and Leonid Kuchma in 2001.

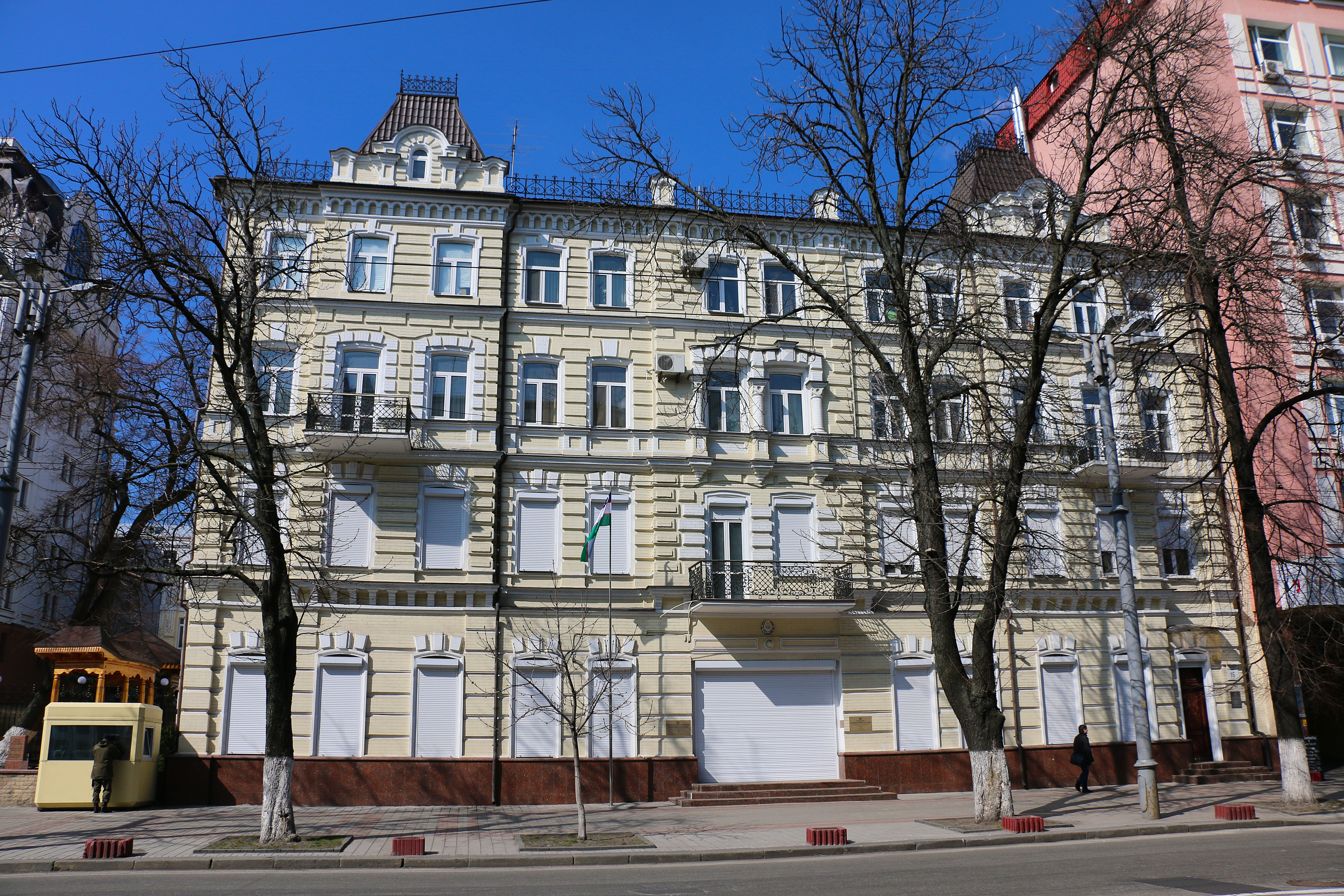
Embassy of Uzbekistan in Kyiv

Diplomatic relations between Ukraine and Uzbekistan were established on 25 August 1992.

== History ==
The Ukrainian Embassy in Tashkent was opened in 1993 while the Uzbek Embassy was opened in Kyiv in 1995.

Since the establishment of relations between the two countries, 8 top-level visits have been made:

Guest	Host	Place of visit	Date of visit
(Ukraine) President Leonid Kuchma	(Uzbekistan) President Islam Karimov	Tashkent	June 1995
(Ukraine) President Leonid Kuchma	(Uzbekistan) President Islam Karimov	Tashkent	October 2000
(Ukraine) President Leonid Kuchma	(Uzbekistan) President Islam Karimov	Tashkent	December 2002
(Ukraine) President Leonid Kuchma	(Uzbekistan) President Islam Karimov	Tashkent	April 2003
(Uzbekistan) President Islam Karimov	(Ukraine) President Leonid Kuchma	Kyiv	August 1992
(Uzbekistan) President Islam Karimov	(Ukraine) President Leonid Kuchma	Kyiv	November 1994
(Uzbekistan) President Islam Karimov	(Ukraine) President Leonid Kuchma	Kyiv	February 1998
(Uzbekistan) President Islam Karimov	(Ukraine) President Leonid Kuchma	Kyiv	October 1999

=== Economic relations ===
Uzbekistan supplies Ukraine with cotton fiber, textiles, petroleum products, and non-ferrous metals. There are currently 48 enterprises operating in Uzbekistan and 34 Uzbek companies in Ukraine. In 2018, Uzbekistan became the largest import country for Ukrainian sugar, which accounted for 60% of all Ukrainian sugar exports. In early October of that year, deliveries became complicated due to an investigation by the Verkhovna Rada into a supposed unfair advantage being given to Uzbek carmakers by providing them with various forms of support. The Oliy Majlis retaliated by imposing sanctions and import bans on Ukrainian sugar and pharmaceuticals. The crisis ended in December when the Joint Ukrainian-Uzbek Commission convened to discuss cooperating on economic issues in the interests of both countries.

=== Cultural relations ===
The first version of the monument to Taras Shevchenko monument was installed in Tashkent on 21 November 1920. In October 2000, during the official state visit of Ukrainian President Leonid Kuchma to Uzbekistan, he and the President Islam Karimov laid a memorial stone at the site of the installation of the future monument to Shevchenko. Two years later, on 20 December 2002, Kuchma unveiled the monument to Shevchenko made by sculptor Leonid Ryabtsev. It was announced in 2016 that there was plans to open an Alisher Navoi Monument in Kyiv.

== Ukrainian diaspora ==
There are currently 86,000 Ukrainians or people of Ukrainian descent living in Uzbekistan. They mostly live in large urban cities such as Tashkent, Samarkand, Bukhara and Fergana as well as speak the Uzbek language or the Surzhyk sociolect. Crimean Tatar is also widely spoken by this community. Most belong to the Ukrainian Greek Catholic Church and the Orthodox Church of Ukraine.

According to Ukrainian and Russian archives, the first Ukrainians arrived in Central Asia in the mid-18th century. The first mass settlement of Ukrainians in Turkestan began in 1885 and by 1897, the first permanent settlements appeared in the Samarkand Region, with Ukrainian language schools and other Ukrainian traditions being observed. During the Great Patriotic War, thousands of Ukrainians in the Ukrainian SSR were evacuated to Soviet Uzbekistan. In the aftermath of the 1966 Tashkent earthquake, over 2,500 Ukrainian engineers participated in the restoration of Tashkent. In January 2014, leaders in the Ukrainian diaspora spoke out to condemn an unauthorized rally in support of Euromaidan near the monument to Shevchenko, in which participants waved flags of Ukraine, Georgia and the Ukrainian Insurgent Army.

=== Notable people ===
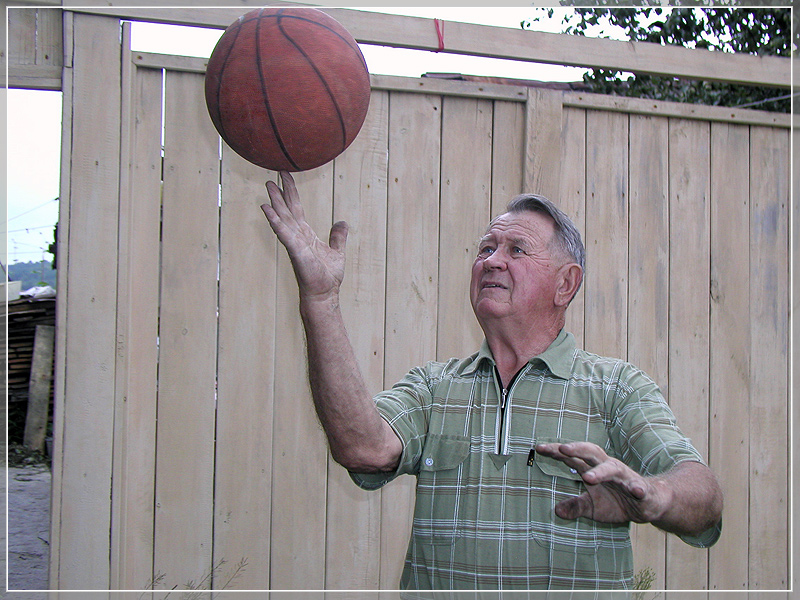
Leonid Velichko in January 2014.

- Vladimir Kozak – An Uzbek professional football player of Ukrainian descent who currently plays for Pakhtakor Tashkent.
- Viktor Pasulko – Ukrainian expatriate in Uzbekistan.
- Sultan Rakhmanov – Uzbekistani-Ukrainian olympic weightlifter.
- Andrei Karyaka – Ukrainian/Russian football coach of Uzbekistani descent.
- Konstantin Bondarev – Deputy of the Verkhovna Rada born in Tashkent.
- Sogdiana Fedorinskaya – Uzbek singer and actress.
- Egor Krimets – Professional football player.
- Ekaterina Khilko – Trampoline gymnast born in Uzbekistan.
- Boris Beder – Honoured geologist of the Uzbek SSR.
- Leonid Velichko – Uzbek basketball and hockey coach of Ukrainian descent.

== Resident diplomatic missions ==
- Ukraine has an embassy in Tashkent.
- Uzbekistan has an embassy in Kyiv.

== See also ==
- Foreign relations of Ukraine
- Foreign relations of Uzbekistan
