= Belarus–Uzbekistan relations =

Belarus–Uzbekistan relations relations
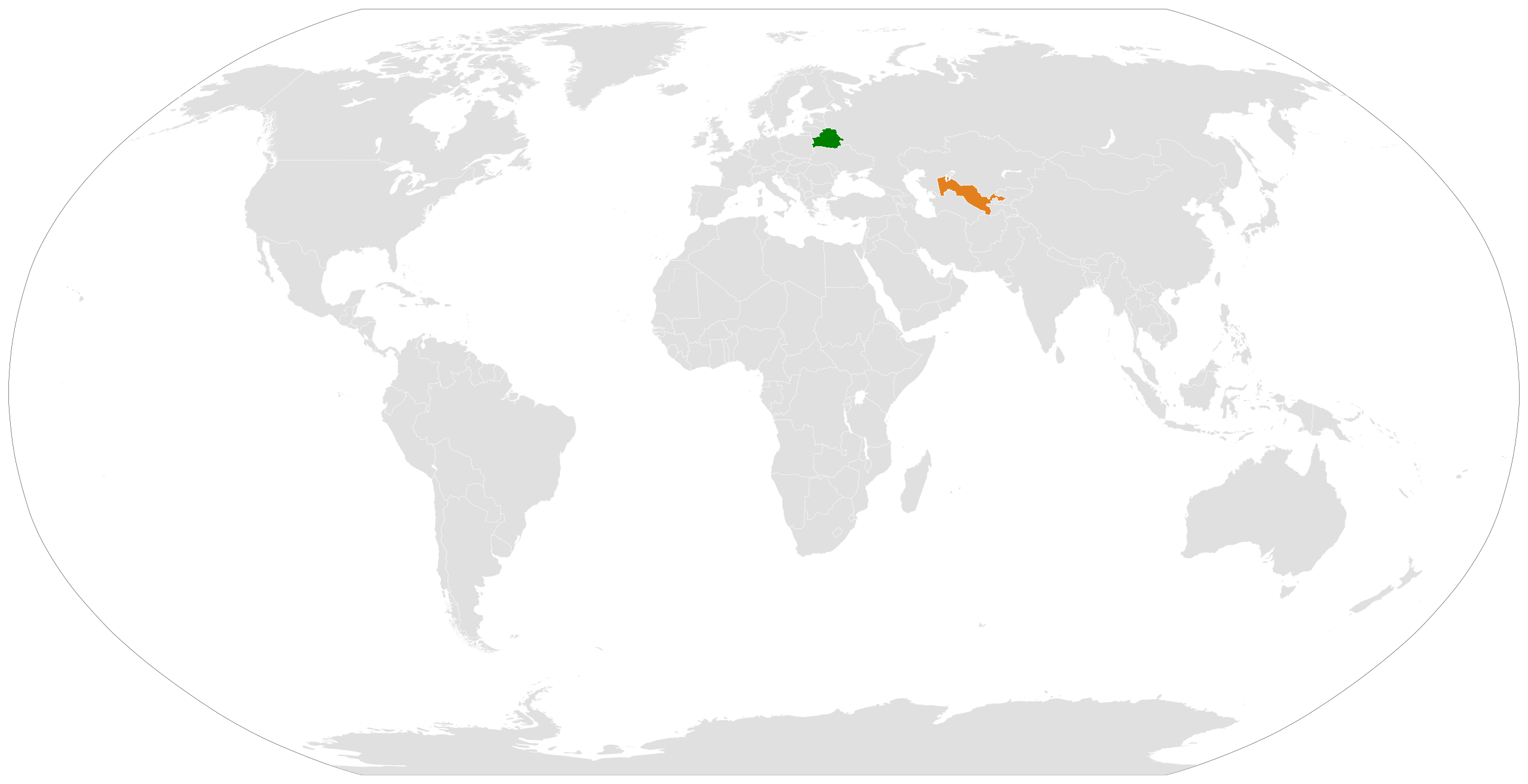

- Belarus: Uzbekistan

Diplomatic relations between Belarus and Uzbekistan were established on 21 January 1993, with the Belarusian Embassy in Tashkent being opened in February 1994. Uzbekistan also has an embassy in Minsk.

== State visits ==
Belarusian President Alexander Lukashenko paid official visits to Uzbekistan in December 1994 and September 2018. According to his former campaign manager Alyaksandr Feduta, Lukashenko in the former visit was asked by Mayor Kozim Tulyaganov through him to allow the performance of young women in traditional clothes to stop, citing that "the women were freezing in their costumes", to which Lukashenko stayed for a further 15 minutes, which Feduta claims displayed the Belarusian leader's "cruelty". Lukashenko's 2018 visit was the first to occur in 24 years, being held on 13–14 September of that year.

Uzbek President Islam Karimov visited Minsk in October 2014. His successor Shavkat Mirziyoyev also visited Minsk on 1 August 2019.

== Military cooperation ==
In March 2018, the Academy of the Armed Forces of Uzbekistan and the Military-Technical Institute of the National Guard of Uzbekistan signed a memorandum of cooperation with the Military Academy of Belarus. That same month, the Defense Minister of Belarus Andrey Ravkov visited Uzbekistan, expressing a readiness to repair and modernize Uzbek armored vehicles and aircraft.

In September 2018, servicemen of Special Forces of the Ministry of Defense of Uzbekistan went to Belarus to participate in competitions among other foreign special forces at a training ground located in the village of Maryina Gorka.

== Resident diplomatic missions ==
- Belarus has an embassy in Tashkent.
- Uzbekistan has an embassy in Minsk.

== See also ==
- Foreign relations of Belarus
- Foreign relations of Uzbekistan

== Sources ==
- The Ministry of Foreign Affairs of Uzbekistan on relations with Belarus and countries in the CIS
- The Ministry of Foreign Affairs of Belarus on relations with Uzbekistan
- Lukashenko receives first copy of Yakub Kolas' poems in Uzbek as gift - eng.belta.by.
- Presidents of Belarus and Uzbekistan meet in Tashkent
- Ministers of Defense of Uzbekistan and Belarus discuss cooperation issues
