= Antti Turunen =

Antti Turunen is the head of the Finnish Foreign Ministry's Eastern European and Central Asian department. He was also Representative of the UN Secretary General for Georgia in 2010. He was also the Permanent Representatives of Finland to the OSCE in Vienna between 2007–2010.

== Visit to Uzbekistan ==
Turunen led a European Union fact-finding mission to Tashkent, Uzbekistan on 29 August 2006. The Uzbek deputy foreign minister indicated that the Uzbek government was interested in talks with the EU during a visit to Helsinki, Finland in June 2006, just before Finland assumed the EU presidency. Radio Free Europe journalists spoke to Turunen on 1 September. Turunen said the visit was inconclusive, but promising enough for the EU to "analyze" to see if the sanctions imposed on Uzbekistan could be lifted. Turunen's visit to Uzbekistan was the first EU visit since October, when sanctions were imposed after the Uzbek government refused to allow an international investigation into the Andijan massacre.

The diplomatic sanctions consisted of a ban on political contacts, aid cuts, and visa bans on officials held responsible for the events in Andijan and their cover-up. Turunen said, "There are many, many open cases on human rights, and we have to now carefully look into what has really been done and what recommendations of [the] international community have been implemented. They indicated [then] that there would be possibilities to again resume ministerial level dialogue, that they might be willing to again discuss all aspects of EU-Uzbek relations, including the events in Andijan. That will be part of the assessment of the sanctions regime and on the basis of that assessment a decision on the fate of the sanctions will be made by mid-November."

Turunen said that the visit went "smoothly" and that Uzbek Foreign Minister Vladimir Norov offered a "warm reception". The EU delegation met with officials from the Justice Ministry, the Attorney General's office, and Uzbek parliament members in a "rather good" atmosphere. He stressed that "the real issue" for the EU is the Uzbek government's response to the Andijan massacre and human rights abuses. "Well, it seems that at the moment the issue with the international inquiry is not on the agenda as such. They are to a certain extent open to discuss on expert level the events that took place in Andijan and we have to now see what this amounts to, what concrete steps towards that direction could be taken. The other issue is they are now willing to engage on human rights, to establish some kind of human rights dialogue or regular meetings on human rights issues which, in itself, is a positive signal."

Although he was unsure what prompted the invitation to EU officials, he said Uzbekistan is trying to overcome its isolation. He said Russia-Uzbek relations and possible EU development of Uzbek energy reserves were not "directly" discussed but that "one might assume in the longer run they look forward to EU investment in this area." If the sanctions are lifted, a "Cooperation Council" meeting with Foreign Minister Norov will take place in Brussels later this autumn.

== See also ==
- Uzbek President Islam Karimov
- Uzbek Foreign Minister Sodiq Safoyev
