= Russia–Uzbekistan relations =

- Russia: Uzbekistan

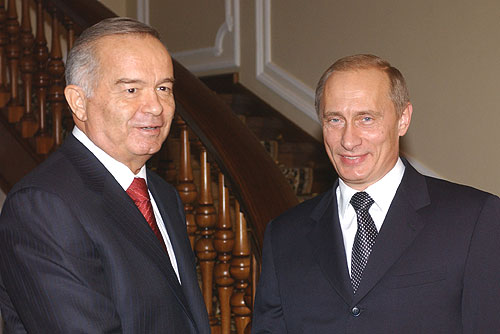
Uzbek President Islam Karimov and Russian President Vladimir Putin in 2004

Russia–Uzbekistan relations (Russian: Российско-узбекские отношения, Uzbek: O'zbekiston-Rossiya munosabatlari) are the bilateral relations between Russia and Uzbekistan.

== Overview ==
Uzbekistan was a Soviet socialist republic from 1924 until 1991. Both countries have had diplomatic relations since 1992. In the first years of independence, Uzbekistan remained within the rouble-zone until November 1993. The country has since moved politically away from the Russian Federation.

Good relations with Uzbekistan are a key to Russian great power politics in the greater Central Asian region. On the other hand, Uzbekistan follows a "multi-vectoral policy" with good relations to Russia, China, the United States and other states.

In 1999 parallel to the Kosovo War, Uzbekistan joined the GUAM alliance, which formed into an international organization in 2001. It was called GUUAM until 2005, when the country departed.

In 2003, Gazprom took over control of the Uzbek pipeline network. In the same year, Uzbekistan started gas exports to the then economically recovering Russia.

In the aftermath of the May 2005 unrest, Uzbekistan demanded that the United States leave the base at Karshi-Khanabad. Additionally, Uzbekistan left GUUAM, which again became GUAM. On 14 November 2005, both presidents Islam Karimov and Vladimir Putin signed a mutual cooperation agreement in Moscow.

In 2012, Uzbekistan opted to formally withdraw from the Russian-led CSTO alliance, leading some to debate whether such a move indicated a shift in its foreign policy to the West. However, Uzbekistan remains a part of the Shanghai Cooperation Organisation, of which both Russia and China are part.

After the annexation of Crimea by Russia, separatist movements in the Northern Uzbekistani region of Karakalpakstan grew stronger. Many Karakalpaks live in Kazakhstan, Russia and South Korea for work and the minority is considered to be pro-Russian.

In 2014, Russia forgave nearly all of the Uzbek debt to Russia in order to boost the relations between the two countries.

== Resident diplomatic missions ==
of Russia in Uzbekistan

- Tashkent (Embassy)

of Uzbekistan in Russia

- Moscow (Embassy)
- Kazan (Consulate-General)
- Novosibirsk (Consulate-General)
- Rostov-on-Don (Consulate-General)
- Saint Petersburg (Consulate-General)
- Vladivostok (Consulate-General)
- Yekaterinburg (Consulate-General)

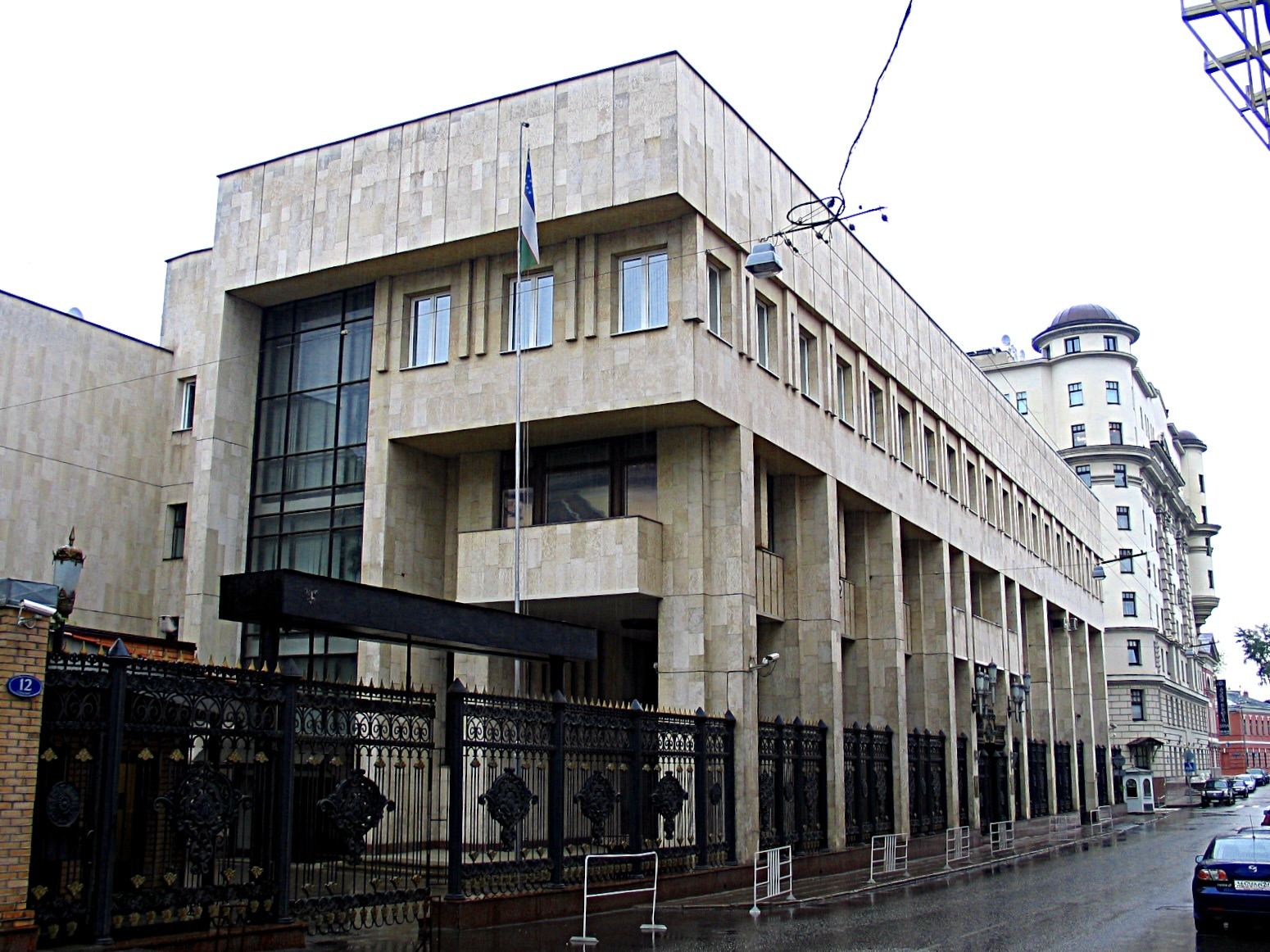
Embassy of Uzbekistan in Moscow

Consulate-General of Uzbekistan in Saint Petersburg

== See also ==
- Foreign relations of Russia
- Foreign relations of Uzbekistan
- List of ambassadors of Russia to Uzbekistan
- Russians in Uzbekistan
- Eurasian Union
- Shanghai Cooperation Organisation
