= Clarence Moore House, Washington, D.C. =

Historic house in Washington D.C.

- U.S. National Register of Historic Places
- U.S. Historic district – Contributing property
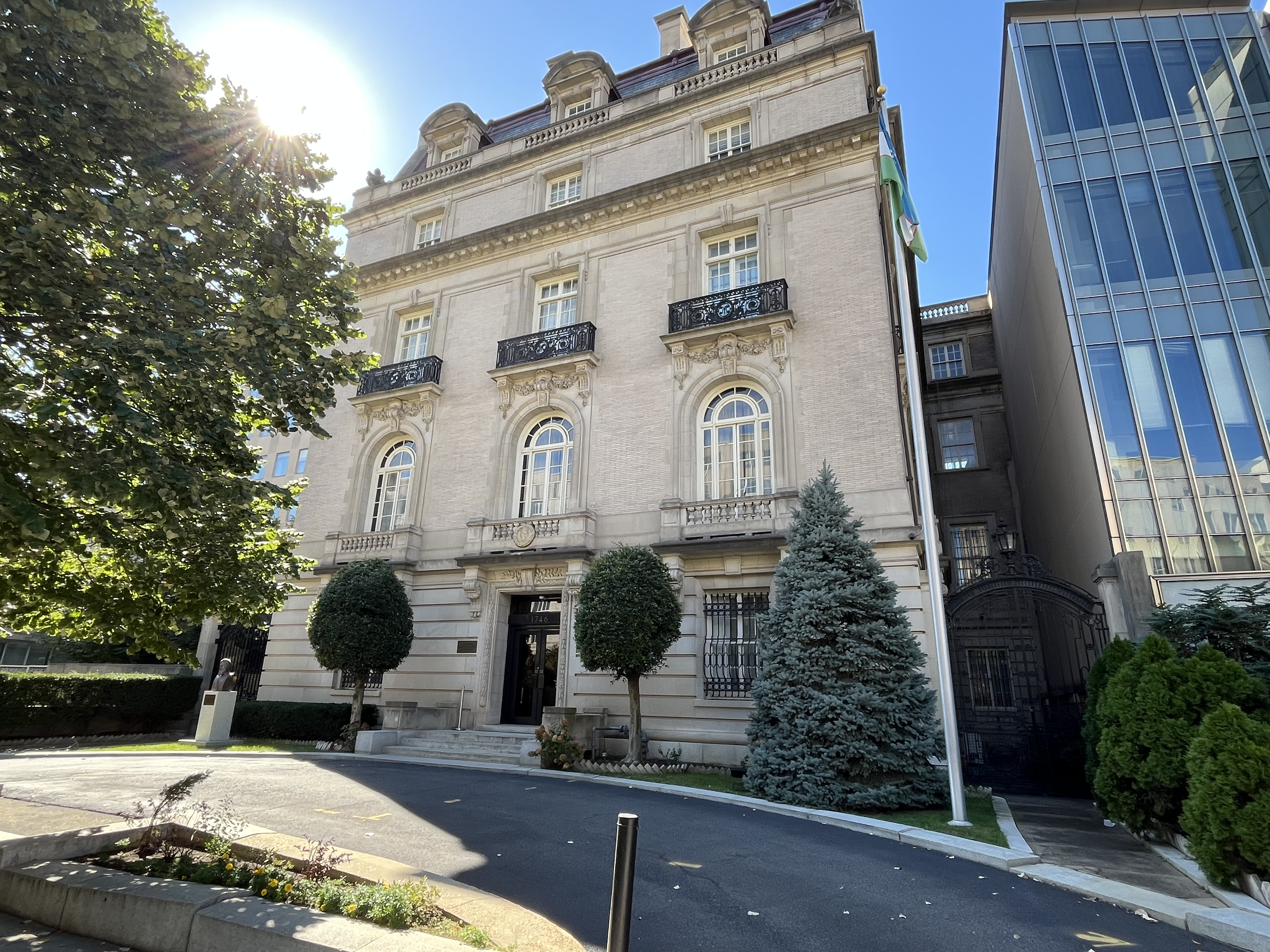
- Serving as the Embassy of Uzbekistan since 1993
- Location: 1746 Massachusetts Ave. NW Washington, D.C., U.S.
- Coordinates: 38°54′30″N 77°02′26″W
- Built: 1909; 117 years ago
- Architect: Bruce Price; Jules Henri de Sibour
- Architectural style: Beaux-Arts
- Part of: Dupont Circle Historic District (ID78003056)
- NRHP reference No.: 73002076

Significant dates
- Added to NRHP: April 3, 1973
- Designated CP: July 21, 1978

The building's location in Washington, D.C.

The Clarence Moore House, Washington, D.C. (also known as the Embassy of Uzbekistan and the Old Canadian Embassy), is a building in Washington, D.C. which is on the National Register of Historic Places. An example of Beaux Arts architecture in blond Roman brick with limestone dressings, it was built in 1909 by Clarence Moore, a wealthy coal magnate, as his family residence. It has been on the National Register of Historic Places (NRHP) since 1973.

Moore died in the sinking of the Titanic in 1912. From then on, his widow, Mabelle, used the house mainly for social and entertaining purposes. In 1927, she sold it to the Government of Canada, which used it as the Canadian diplomatic mission until 1989. In 1992, Canada sold the building to the Republic of Uzbekistan which has used it since 1993 as the Embassy of Uzbekistan.

== Location and historic status ==
The building is located at 1746 Massachusetts Avenue NW on Embassy Row in Washington, D.C., between Scott Circle and Dupont Circle. It was listed on the National Register of Historic Places on April 3, 1973. The building is also designated a contributing property to the Massachusetts Avenue Historic District and Dupont Circle Historic District, which are both listed on the NRHP. It is also listed on the District of Columbia Inventory of Historic Sites. As of 2012, the value of the Clarence Moore House property was $13,423,870.

== History ==
=== Clarence Moore residence ===
Clarence Moore, a coal magnate from West Virginia and member of private clubs in Paris and New York City, chose the New York City-based architect Bruce Price and the Washington-based Jules Henri de Sibour to design his home in Washington, D.C. At the time, Sibour was a prominent architect of large residences in Washington, including the Thomas T. Gaff House, Andrew Mellon Building, and the ambassadors' residences of Portugal, France, and Luxembourg. Moore purchased the land from Edward J. Stellwagen for $37,422. Construction began in September 1906 and was completed in 1909. Moore only lived in the house for three years. On April 15, 1912, he was one of the 1,517 passengers who perished during the sinking of the RMS Titanic. After Moore's death, his widow, Mabelle, remarried and only used the home for diplomatic and social events.

=== Canadian embassy ===
On May 28, 1927, Mabelle sold the house to the Government of Canada for $375,000. A portion of the furnishings were purchased for an additional $100,000. Until 1931, Canada was represented in the United States by the British Embassy.

From 1927 until 1946, the Clarence Moore House served as the Canadian chancery as well as the residence of the Canadian minister, and later the ambassador. In 1943 the legation was raised to embassy status and Leighton McCarthy became the first Canadian ambassador to the United States. In 1946, the ambassador's residence was constructed at 2825 Rock Creek Drive, and the Clarence Moore House was then used solely for embassy office space.

The Canadian government purchased land on Pennsylvania Avenue in 1978 for $5 million for use as a new location for its chancery. Clarence Moore House continued as the chancery of the Canadian Embassy until 1988, when the embassy moved to the current location.

=== Uzbekistan embassy ===
After diplomatic relations between the United States and Uzbekistan were established on February 19, 1992, the government of Uzbekistan purchased the Clarence Moore House. The new embassy opened in February 1993 and advocates Uzbekistan's political, commercial, and economic interests to the government of the United States. The current Ambassador of Uzbekistan to the United States is Furqat Sidikov. The Uzbekistan Ministry of Foreign Affairs also maintains a consulate and a permanent mission to the United Nations, both in New York.

== Architecture ==
=== Exterior design ===
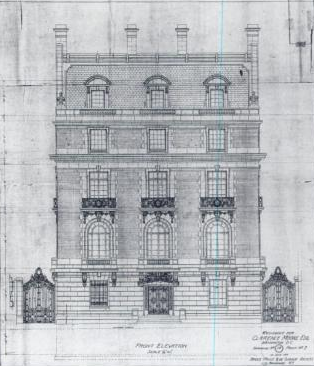
Drawing designs by de Sibour of the Clarence Moore House

The Clarence Moore House is a classic example of the Beaux Arts architectural style and features a Louis XV-style exterior. The 4 1/2-story structure includes a basement and comprises brick walls, a concrete floor, and a steel roof. The building measures 79.5 feet (24.2 m) in height and the walls are made of Roman brick. A limestone Tuscan entablature with a bracket cornice separate the third and fourth floors. The building's north entrance on Massachusetts Avenue has a 6 × 6 foot (1.8 × 1.8 m) stoop flanked by limestone balustrades. Above the entrance and ground floor windows are limestone corbels and guttae. The corbels support limestone second floor balconies and a vase balustrade. The third floor balconies are made of limestone and feature cast iron railings. The second, third, and fourth floor window and architraves are set in a quoined limestone ground. Six limestone chimneys, capped with Tusance entablature, are visible from the ground level. Two chimneys are located at the front and back of the house and a chimney is located on the eastern and western sides. The slate mansard roof has a limestone and metal ridge.

=== Interior design ===
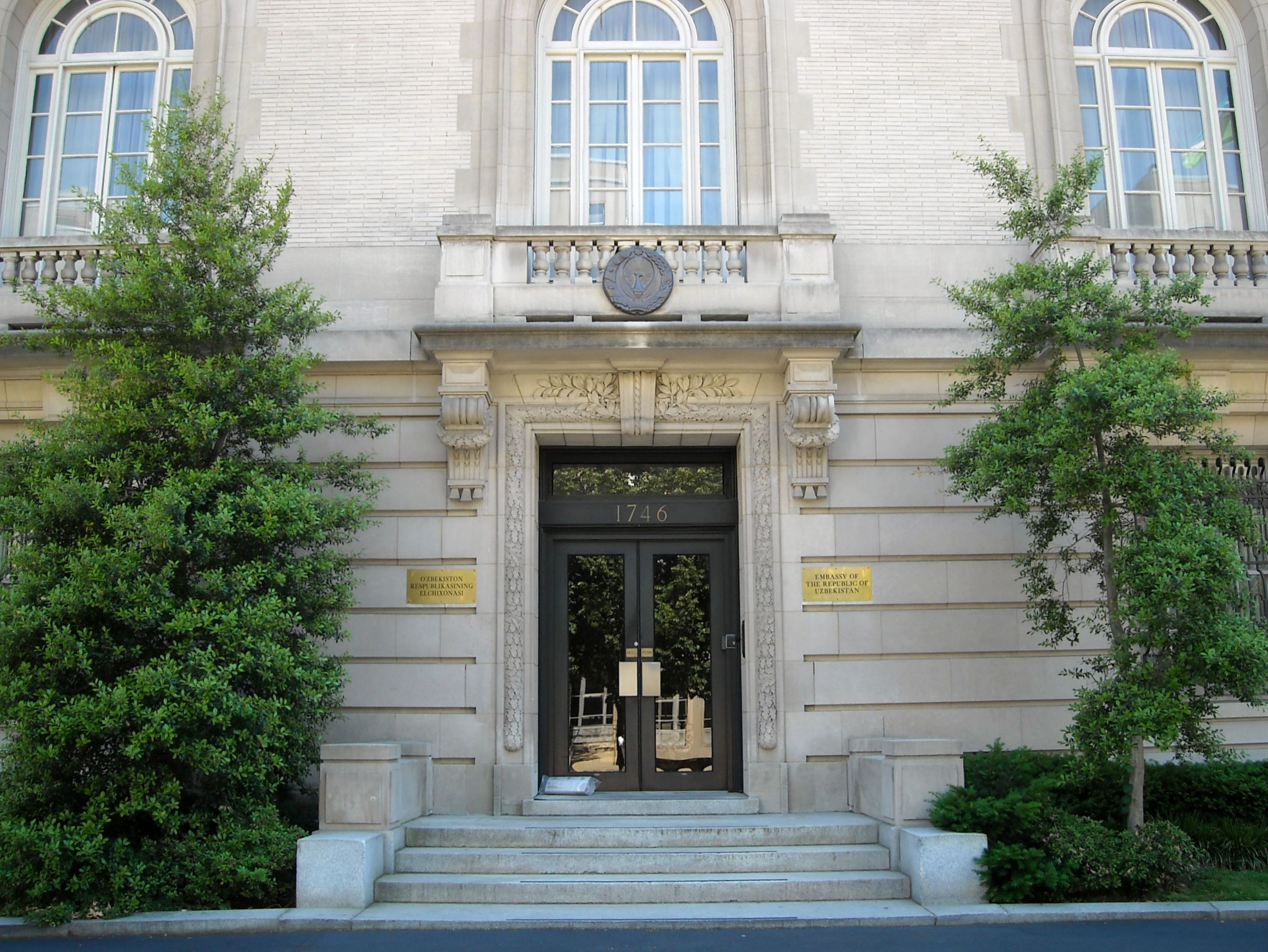
Entrance to the Embassy of Uzbekistan

The home's interior features 16th, 17th, and 18th century French and English details. The building is heated by an oil-burning, hot air furnace and contains an Otis passenger elevator and freight elevator. The passenger elevator is wood-paneled and the freight elevator measures 5 × 4 feet (1.5 × 1.2 m) in size. The flooring consists of black and white marble squares and the walls are plastered to simulate limestone. In the back of the house is a five-bay entrance hall and staircase. The library entrance is located on the right side of the hallway and two reception rooms and a lavatory are located on the left side. Near the end of the hall are service rooms, service elevator, dining room (now the ambassador's office), and a breakfast room. A lavatory is located beneath the main staircase. At the end of the hall are two parlors and a large drawing room. The second floor contains three bedrooms, two baths, and a service area. One of the bedrooms, the master suite, contains a separate staircase that gives access to the upper floors. The third floor contains bedroom suites and a playroom in the southeast corner. The fourth floor contains additional bedrooms and servants' quarters.

== See also ==
- List of diplomatic missions of Uzbekistan
- List of diplomatic missions in Washington, D.C.
- National Register of Historic Places listings in the District of Columbia
