= List of diplomatic missions in Uzbekistan =

Representatives of other states in Uzbekistan

This is a list of diplomatic missions in Uzbekistan. At present, the capital of Tashkent hosts 47 embassies.

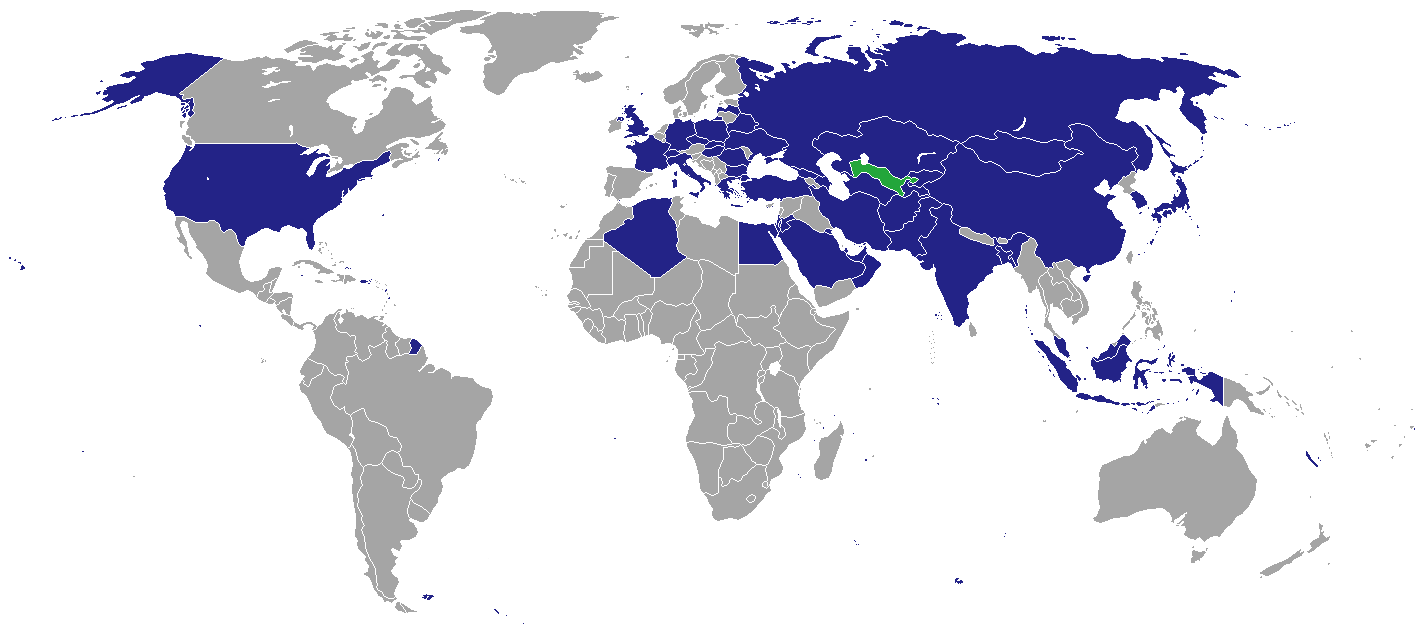
Map of diplomatic missions in Uzbekistan

== Diplomatic missions in Tashkent ==
=== Embassies ===
1. Afghanistan
2. Algeria
3. Azerbaijan
4. Bangladesh
5. Belarus
6. Belgium
7. Bulgaria
8. China
9. Czech Republic
10. Egypt
11. France
12. Georgia
13. Germany
14. Greece
15. Holy See
16. Hungary
17. India
18. Indonesia
19. Iran
20. Israel
21. Italy
22. Japan
23. Jordan
24. Kazakhstan
25. Kuwait
26. Kyrgyzstan
27. Latvia
28. Malaysia
29. Mongolia
30. Oman
31. Pakistan
32. Palestine
33. Poland
34. Qatar
35. Romania
36. Russia
37. Saudi Arabia
38. Slovakia
39. South Korea
40. Switzerland
41. Tajikistan
42. Turkey
43. Turkmenistan
44. Ukraine
45. United Arab Emirates
46. United Kingdom
47. United States

=== Other representative offices or delegations ===
1. European Union (Delegation)
2. Tatarstan (Office)

== Consular missions ==
=== Samarkand ===
1. Kazakhstan (Consulate-General)
2. Turkey (Consulate-General)

=== Termez ===
1. Afghanistan (Consulate-General)

== Closed missions ==
- North Korea (Embassy) (closed in 2016)
- Vietnam (Embassy)

== Non-resident embassies ==
In Moscow, except as noted.

- Argentina
- Armenia (Yerevan)
- Australia
- Austria (Vienna)
- Benin
- Bosnia and Herzegovina
- Brazil
- Burundi
- Canada
- Central African Republic
- Chile
- Colombia
- Croatia (Ankara)
- Cuba (Baku)
- Cyprus
- Denmark
- Estonia (Riga)
- Fiji (Seoul)
- Finland (Helsinki)
- Gambia (Ankara)
- Ghana (Tehran)
- Guinea (Tehran)
- Haiti (Seoul)
- Iceland
- Iraq
- Ireland
- Jamaica (Beijing)
- Kenya (Tehran)
- Laos
- Lesotho (New Delhi)
- Lithuania (Astana)
- Madagascar
- Maldives (Islamabad)
- Mali
- Malta (Valletta)
- Mexico (Tehran)
- Moldova (Kyiv)
- Morocco (Baku)
- Netherlands (Astana)
- New Zealand
- Norway (Oslo)
- Paraguay
- Philippines (Tehran)
- Portugal
- Senegal
- Serbia
- Seychelles (Abu Dhabi)
- Sierra Leone
- Singapore
- Slovenia
- Somalia (Ankara)
- South Africa (Ankara)
- Spain
- Sri Lanka
- Sweden (Stockholm)
- Taiwan (Ankara)
- Tanzania
- Thailand
- Togo (Beijing)
- Uganda
- Uruguay
- Vietnam
- Zimbabwe
- Zambia
