= List of international trips made by Antony Blinken as United States Secretary of State =

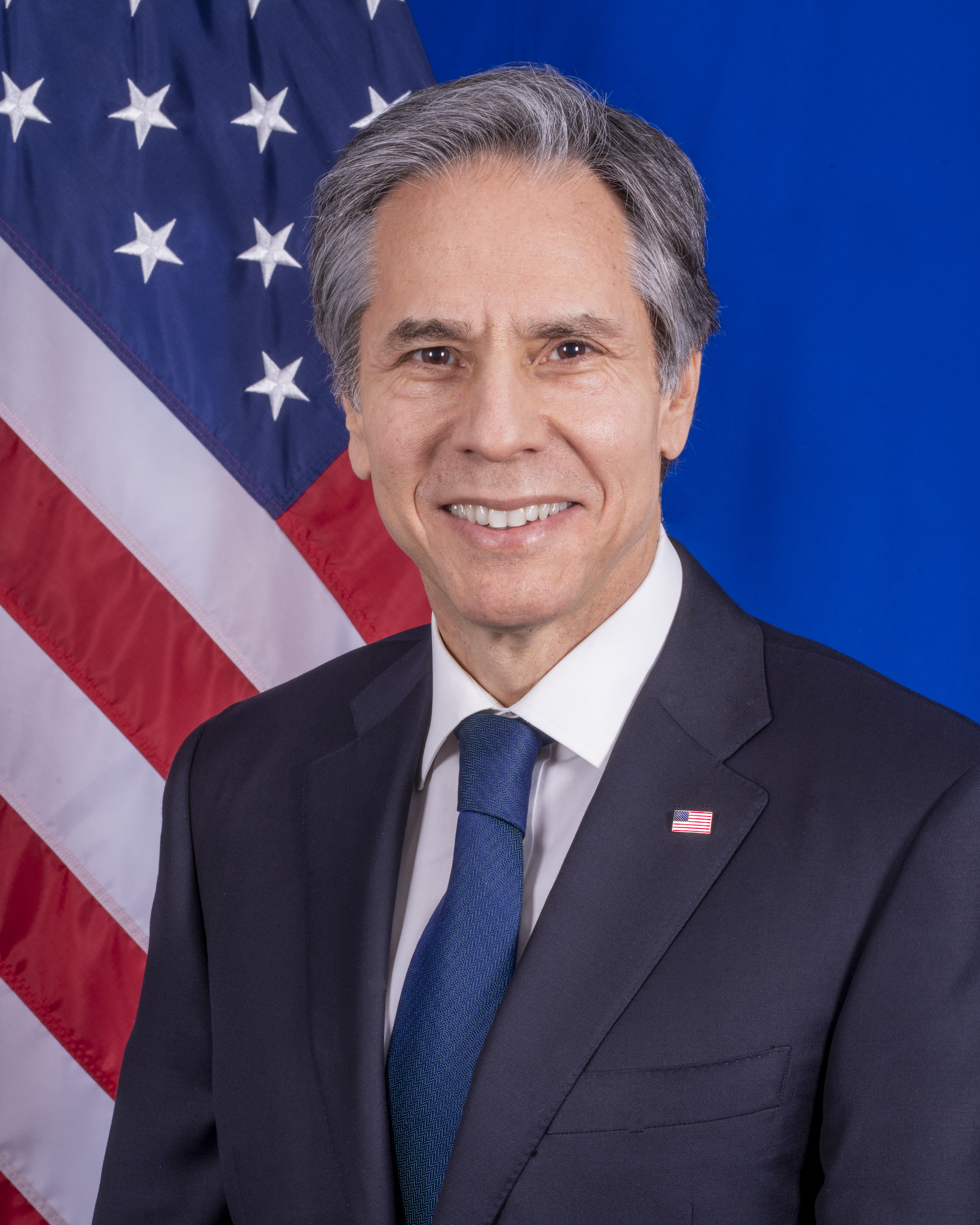
Official portrait of Antony Blinken as Secretary of State, 2021

This is a list of international visits undertaken by Antony Blinken (in office 2021–2025) while serving as the 71st United States secretary of state. The list includes both private travel and official visits. The list includes only foreign travel which he made during his tenure in the position.

== Summary ==
Blinken visited 89 countries. The number of visits per country or territory where Secretary Blinken traveled are:

- One visit to Afghanistan, Albania, Algeria, Angola, Argentina, Austria, Cabo Verde, Chile, Costa Rica, Côte d'Ivoire, Cyprus, Czech Republic, the Democratic Republic of the Congo, Denmark, the Dominican Republic, Ecuador, Estonia, Ethiopia, Fiji, Finland, Greenland, Guatemala, Guyana, Haiti, Iceland, Jamaica, Kazakhstan, Kenya, Kuwait, Malaysia, Malta, Mongolia, Morocco, New Zealand, Niger, North Macedonia, Norway, Panama, Papua New Guinea, Romania, Rwanda, Senegal, Singapore, South Africa, Spain, Tonga, Trinidad and Tobago and Uzbekistan
- Two visits to Australia, Brazil, Cambodia, Canada, China, Colombia, Greece, Iraq, Ireland, Laos, Latvia, Lithuania, Moldova, Nigeria, Peru, Sweden and Thailand
- Three visits to Bahrain, the Philippines, Switzerland, Vatican City and Vietnam
- Four visits to India, Indonesia, Poland, South Korea, Turkey and the United Arab Emirates
- Five visits to Mexico
- Six visits to Italy
- Seven visits to Ukraine
- Eight visits to France, Japan, the Palestinian National Authority, Qatar and Saudi Arabia
- Nine visits to the United Kingdom
- Ten visits to Egypt, Germany and Jordan
- Twelve visits to Belgium
- Sixteen visits to Israel

Map of international trips made by Antony Blinken as secretary of state: United States 7 or more visits 6 visits 5 visits 4 visits 3 visits 2 visits 1 visit

== Table ==
	Country	Locations	Dates	Details	Images
1	Japan	Tokyo	March 15–17, 2021	Traveled with Defense Secretary Lloyd Austin. Met with Foreign Minister Toshimitsu Motegi and Defense Minister Nobuo Kishi in a "2+2" meeting. Also met with Prime Minister Yoshihide Suga.	Secretary Blinken and Defense Secretary Austin meet with Japanese Prime Minister Yoshihide Suga in Tokyo, March 2021
1	South Korea	Seoul	March 17–18, 2021	Traveled with Defense Secretary Austin. Met with Foreign Minister Chung Eui-yong and Defense Minister Suh Wook in a "2+2" meeting. Also met with President Moon Jae-in.	Secretary Blinken and Defense Secretary Austin meet with South Korean President Moon Jae-in and their counterparts in Seoul, March 2021
2	Belgium	Brussels	March 22–25, 2021	Met with Foreign Minister Sophie Wilmès, European Commission Ursula von der Leyen, EU High Representative Josep Borrell and NATO Secretary General Jens Stoltenberg. Also attended a NATO Foreign Ministerial meeting.	Secretary Blinken with European Union High Representative for Foreign Affairs and Security Policy and Vice President of the European Commission Josep Borrell in Brussels, March 2021
3	Belgium	Brussels	April 13–15, 2021	Traveled with Defense Secretary Austin to consult with NATO Allies and partners on a range of shared priorities. Held bilateral and multilateral meetings with European counterparts to discuss key priorities and shared challenges.	Secretary Blinken and Secretary Austin with NATO Secretary General Jens Stoltenberg in Brussels, April 2021
3	Afghanistan	Kabul	April 15, 2021	Met with President Ashraf Ghani and Chairman of the High Council for National Reconciliation, Abdullah Abdullah.	Secretary Blinken with Afghan President Ashraf Ghani in Kabul, April 2021
4	United Kingdom	London	May 3–5, 2021	Attended the G7 Foreign and Development Ministers’ Meeting. Met separately with Foreign Secretary Dominic Raab and Prime Minister Boris Johnson, as well as Japanese Foreign Minister Toshimitsu Motegi and South Korean Foreign Minister Chung Eui-yong.	Secretary Blinken with British Prime Minister Boris Johnson in London, May 2021
4	Ukraine	Kyiv	May 5–6, 2021	Met with President Volodymyr Zelenskyy, Prime Minister Denys Shmyhal and Foreign Minister Dmytro Kuleba.	Secretary Blinken with Ukrainian President Volodymyr Zelenskyy in Kyiv, May 2021
5	Denmark	Copenhagen	May 16–17, 2021	Met with Queen Margrethe II, Crown Prince Frederik, Prime Minister Mette Frederiksen and Foreign Minister Jeppe Kofod.	Secretary Blinken with Danish Prime Minister Mette Frederiksen in Copenhagen, May 2021
5	Iceland	Reykjavík	May 17–20, 2021	Met with President Guðni Th. Jóhannesson, Prime Minister Katrín Jakobsdóttir and Foreign Minister Guðlaugur Þór Þórðarson. Also attended the Arctic Council Ministerial meeting to discuss key priorities and address the threats of the climate crisis.	Secretary Blinken participates in the Arctic Council Ministerial Family Photo in Reykjavík, May 2021
5	Greenland	Kangerlussuaq	May 20, 2021	Met with Prime Minister Múte Bourup Egede and Foreign Minister Pele Broberg.	Secretary Blinken with Greenlandic Premier Múte Bourup Egede, Greenlandic Foreign Minister Pele Broberg, and Danish Foreign Minister Jeppe Kofod in Kangerlussuaq, May 2021
6	Ireland	Shannon	May 24, 2021	Met with Foreign Minister Simon Coveney.	Secretary Blinken with Irish Minister for Foreign Affairs and Defence Simon Coveney at Shannon International Airport, May 2021
6	Israel	Jerusalem	May 25–26, 2021	Met with President Reuven Rivlin, Prime Minister Benjamin Netanyahu, Alternate Prime Minister Benny Gantz and Foreign Minister Gabi Ashkenazi.	Secretary Blinken with Israeli Prime Minister Benjamin Netanyahu in Jerusalem, May 2021
6	Palestinian National Authority	Ramallah	May 25, 2021	Met with President Mahmoud Abbas and Prime Minister Mohammad Shtayyeh.	Secretary Blinken with Palestinian Authority President Mahmoud Abbas in Ramallah, May 2021
6	Egypt	Cairo	May 26, 2021	Met with President Abdel Fattah el-Sisi and Foreign Minister Sameh Shoukry.	Secretary Blinken with Egyptian President Abdel Fattah el-Sisi in Cairo, May 2021
6	Jordan	Amman	May 26–27, 2021	Met with King Abdullah II and Foreign Minister Ayman Safadi.	Secretary Blinken with King Abdullah II of Jordan in Amman, May 2021
7	Costa Rica	San José	June 1–2, 2021	Met with President Carlos Alvarado Quesada and Foreign Minister Rodolfo Solano. Also attended a Central American Integration System (SICA) meeting.	Secretary Blinken with Costa Rican President Carlos Alvarado in San Jose, June 2021
8	United Kingdom	London; Carbis Bay	June 10–12, 2021	Accompanied President Biden to the G7 summit in Cornwall. Also met with Foreign Secretary Dominic Raab and South Korea Foreign Minister Chung Eui-yong.	
8	Belgium	Brussels	June 12–15, 2021	Accompanied President Biden to the 31st NATO summit and the EU–U.S. summit. Also participated in a signing ceremony with Prime Minister Edi Rama on 4G and 5G security	Secretary Blinken with Albanian Prime Minister Edi Rama in Brussels, June 2021
8	Switzerland	Geneva	June 16, 2021	Accompanied President Biden to the summit meeting with Russian President Vladimir Putin. Also met with President Guy Parmelin and Foreign Minister Ignazio Cassis.	Secretary Blinken with President Biden, Russian President Vladimir Putin and Russian Foreign Minister Sergey Lavrov at the 2021 Russia–United States summit in Geneva, June 2021
9	Germany	Berlin	June 22–24, 2021	Met with Chancellor Angela Merkel and Foreign Minister Heiko Maas. Also attended the 2nd Berlin Conference on the 2021 Libyan general election.	Secretary Blinken with German Chancellor Angela Merkel in Berlin, June 2021
9	France	Paris	June 24–27, 2021	Met with President Emmanuel Macron, Foreign Minister Jean-Yves Le Drian and OECD Secretary General Mathias Cormann.	Secretary Blinken with French President Emmanuel Macron in Paris, June 2021
9	Italy	Rome; Bari; Matera	June 27–29, 2021	Met with President Sergio Mattarella, Prime Minister Mario Draghi and Foreign Minister Luigi Di Maio. Blinken co-chaired a meeting of the Global Coalition to Defeat ISIS and participated in a Syria Ministerial. Also attended the G20 Foreign Ministers' Meeting.	Secretary Blinken with Italian President Mattarella in Rome, June 2021
9	Vatican City	Vatican City	June 28, 2021	Met with Pope Francis, Cardinal Pietro Parolin and Archbishop Paul Gallagher.	
10	India	New Delhi	July 26–28, 2021	Met with Prime Minister Narendra Modi, Minister of External Affairs S. Jaishankar and National Security Advisor Ajit Doval.	Secretary Blinken with Indian External Affairs Minister Dr. Subrahmanyam Jaishankar in New Delhi, July 2021
10	Kuwait	Kuwait City	July 28–29, 2021	Met with Sheikh Nawaf Al-Sabah, Prime Minister Sabah Al-Khalid Al-Sabah, Foreign Minister Ahmed Nasser Al-Mohammed Al-Sabah and Speaker Marzouq Al-Ghanim.	Secretary Blinken with Kuwaiti Foreign Minister Sheikh Dr. Ahmed Nasser Al-Mohammed Al-Sabah in Kuwait City, July 2021
11	Qatar	Doha	September 6–8, 2021	Met with Sheikh Tamim bin Hamad Al Thani and Foreign Minister Mohammed bin Abdulrahman bin Jassim Al Thani.	Secretary Blinken with Qatari Deputy Prime Minister and Foreign Minister Mohammed bin Abdulrahman Al Thani in Doha, September 2021
11	Germany	Ramstein Air Base	September 8, 2021	Met with Foreign Minister Heiko Maas and attended a Ministerial on Afghanistan.	Secretary Blinken with German Foreign Minister Heiko Maas at Ramstein Air Base, September 2021
12	France	Paris	October 4–6, 2021	Attended the Organization for Economic Co-operation and Development (OECD) ministerial alongside U.S. Special Presidential Envoy for Climate John Kerry, U.S. Trade Representative Katherine Tai, Chair of the Council of Economic Advisers Cecilia Rouse, and Under Secretary of State for Economic Growth, Energy, and the Environment Jose W. Fernandez.	Secretary Blinken with OECD Secretary-General Mathias Cormann in Paris, October 2021
12	Mexico	Mexico City	October 7–8, 2021	Met with President Andrés Manuel López Obrador and Foreign Secretary Marcelo Ebrard. Attended the U.S.–Mexico High Level Security Dialogue alongside Attorney General Merrick Garland and Secretary of Homeland Security Alejandro Mayorkas with Mexican counterparts.	Secretary Blinken with Mexican Foreign Secretary Marcelo Ebrard in Mexico City, October 2021
13	Ecuador	Quito	October 19, 2021	Met with President Guillermo Lasso and Foreign Minister Mauricio Montalvo.	Secretary Blinken with Ecuadorian President Guillermo Lasso in Quito, October 2021
13	Colombia	Bogotá	October 20–21, 2021	Met with President Iván Duque and Vice President Marta Lucía Ramírez. Also attended a Regional Migration Ministerial and the U.S.-Colombia High-Level Dialogue.	Secretary Blinken with Colombian President Iván Duque in Bogota, October 2021
14	Vatican City	Vatican City	October 28, 2021	Accompanied President Biden and met with Pope Francis at the Apostolic Palace.	
14	Italy	Rome	October 29–31, 2021	Accompanied President Biden to the G20 summit.	Secretary Blinken with President Biden and European Commission President Ursula von der Leyen in Rome, October 2021
14	United Kingdom	Glasgow	November 1–2, 2021	Accompanied President Biden to the 2021 United Nations Climate Change Conference (COP26).	Secretary Blinken with President Biden and French President Emmanuel Macron at COP26 in Glasgow, November 2021
15	Kenya	Nairobi	November 15–18, 2021	Met with President Uhuru Kenyatta and Secretary Raychelle Omamo.	Secretary Blinken with Kenyan President Kenyatta in Nairobi, November 2021
15	Nigeria	Abuja	November 18–19, 2021	Met with President Muhammadu Buhari, Vice President Yemi Osinbajo, and Foreign Minister Geoffrey Onyeama.	Secretary Blinken with Nigerian President Muhammadu Buhari in Abuja, November 2021
15	Senegal	Dakar	November 19–20, 2021	Met with President Macky Sall and Foreign Minister Aïssata Tall Sall.	Secretary Blinken with Senegalese President Macky Sall in Dakar, November 2021
16	Latvia	Riga	November 29–30, 2021	Met with President Egils Levits, Prime Minister Arturs Krišjānis Kariņš, and Foreign Minister Edgars Rinkēvičs. Also attended the NATO Foreign Ministerial.	Secretary Blinken with NATO Foreign Ministers in Riga, November 2021
16	Sweden	Stockholm	December 1–2, 2021	Met with Prime Minister Magdalena Andersson and Foreign Minister Ann Linde. Also attended the Organization for Security and Co-operation in Europe (OSCE) Ministerial Council, during which he met with several counterparts from OSCE member states, including Ukrainian Foreign Minister Dmytro Kuleba and Russian Foreign Minister Sergey Lavrov.	Secretary Blinken with Swedish Prime Minister Magdalena Andersson in Stockholm, December 2021
17	United Kingdom	Liverpool	December 10–13, 2021	Attended the G7 Foreign and Development Ministers' Meeting.	Secretary Blinken with UK Foreign Secretary Liz Truss at the G7 Ministerial in Liverpool, December 2021
17	Indonesia	Jakarta	December 14–15, 2021	Met with President Joko Widodo, Foreign Minister Retno Marsudi, Coordinating Minister for Maritime and Investment Affairs Luhut Binsar Pandjaitan and Minister of Trade Muhammad Lutfi.	Secretary Blinken with Indonesian Foreign Minister Retno Marsudi in Jakarta, December 2021
17	Malaysia	Kuala Lumpur	December 15–16, 2021	Met with Prime Minister Ismail Sabri Yaakob and Foreign Minister Saifuddin Abdullah.	Secretary Blinken with Malaysian Prime Minister Ismail Sabri bin Yaakob in Kuala Lumpur, December 2021
18	Ukraine	Kyiv	January 18–20, 2022	Met with President Volodymyr Zelenskyy and Foreign Minister Dmytro Kuleba.	Secretary Blinken with Ukrainian Foreign Minister Dmytro Kuleba in Kyiv, January 2022
18	Germany	Berlin	January 20–21, 2022	Met with Chancellor Olaf Scholz and Foreign Minister Annalena Baerbock. Also attended ministerial with the Transatlantic Quad Foreign Ministers.	Secretary Blinken with German Chancellor Olaf Scholz in Berlin, January 2022
18	Switzerland	Geneva	January 21, 2022	Met with Russian Foreign Minister Sergey Lavrov. Also met with President and Foreign Minister Ignazio Cassis	Secretary Blinken with Russian Foreign Minister Sergey Lavrov in Geneva, January 2022
19	Australia	Melbourne	February 9–12, 2022	Attended the fourth Quad Foreign Ministers Ministerial Meeting and met with Australian Prime Minister Scott Morrison, Foreign Minister Payne, Japanese Minister for Foreign Affairs Hayashi Yoshimasa, Indian Minister of External Affairs Subrahmanyam Jaishankar.	Secretary Blinken with Australian Foreign Minister Marise Payne, Japanese Foreign Minister Yoshimasa Hayashi, and Indian External Affairs Minister Subrahmanyam Jaishankar in Melbourne, February 2022
19	Fiji	Nadi	February 12, 2022	Met with Pacific Island leaders to discuss the climate crisis, the COVID-19 pandemic, and disaster assistance. Also met with Fiji's Acting Prime Minister Aiyaz Sayed-Khaiyum.	Secretary Blinken with Fijian Acting Prime Minister Aiyaz Sayed-Khaiyum in Nadi, February 2022
20	Germany	Munich	February 18–19, 2022	Attended the Munich Security Conference and bilateral meetings with Transatlantic Quad Foreign Ministers.	Secretary Blinken with German Foreign Minister Annalena Baerbock at the Munich Security Conference, February 2022
21	Belgium	Brussels	March 3–4, 2022	Attended a NATO Foreign Ministerial meeting, a G7 Ministerial meeting and an EU Ministerial meeting. Also met with NATO Secretary General Jens Stoltenberg, EU High Representative Josep Borrell, President of the European Commission Ursula von der Leyen, and President of the European Council Charles Michel.	Secretary Blinken with NATO Foreign Ministers in Brussels, March 2022
21	Poland	Warsaw Korczowa; Rzeszów	March 5, 2022	Met with Polish Foreign Minister Zbigniew Rau to discuss security and humanitarian assistance to Ukraine in the midst of Russia's large-scale military invasion. Also met with Ukrainian Foreign Minister Dmytro Kuleba at the Polish-Ukrainian border.	Secretary Blinken with Polish Foreign Minister Zbigniew Rau in Rzeszow, March 2022
21	Moldova	Chișinău	March 6, 2022	Met with President Maia Sandu, Prime Minister Natalia Gavrilița, and Foreign Minister Nicu Popescu.	Secretary Blinken with Moldovan President Maia Sandu in Chisinau, March 2022
21	Lithuania	Vilnius	March 7, 2022	Met with President Gitanas Nauseda, Prime Minister Ingrida Šimonytė, and Foreign Minister Gabrielius Landsbergis.	Secretary Blinken with Lithuanian Foreign Minister Gabrielius Landsbergis in Vilnius, March 2022
21	Latvia	Riga	March 7, 2022	Met with President Egils Levits, Prime Minister Arturs Krišjānis Kariņš, and Foreign Minister Edgars Rinkēvičs. Also met with Israeli Foreign Minister and Alternate Prime Minister Yair Lapid.	Secretary Blinken with Latvian President Egils Levits in Riga, March 2022
21	Estonia	Tallinn	March 8, 2022	Met with President Alar Karis, Prime Minister Kaja Kallas, and Foreign Minister Eva-Maria Liimets	Secretary Blinken with Estonian Prime Minister Kaja Kallas in Tallinn, March 2022
21	France	Paris	March 8, 2022	Met with President Emmanuel Macron and Foreign Minister Jean-Yves Le Drian.	Secretary Blinken with French President Emmanuel Macron in Paris, March 2022
22	Belgium	Brussels	March 23–25, 2022	Accompanied President Biden at an extraordinary NATO Summit at NATO Headquarters to discuss the Russian invasion of Ukraine. Also attended bilateral meetings at a European Council Summit at Europa building.	Secretary Blinken with French President Emmanuel Macron at a European Council meeting in Brussels, March 24, 2022
22	Poland	Rzeszów; Warsaw	March 25–26, 2022	Accompanied President Biden. Met with Ukrainian Foreign Minister Dmytro Kuleba and Ukrainian Defense Minister Oleksii Reznikov.	Secretary Blinken and President Biden with Ukrainian Foreign Minister Dmytro Kuleba and Minister of Defense Oleksii Reznikov in Warsaw, March 2022
23	Israel	Jerusalem; Sde Boker	March 26–27, 2022	Met with Prime Minister Naftali Bennett, Foreign Minister Yair Lapid, Defense Minister Benny Gantz, and President Isaac Herzog. Also attended the Negev Summit, which Lapid hosted for the foreign ministers of Morocco, UAE, Bahrain, and Egypt.	Secretary Blinken with Israeli Foreign Minister Yair Lapid, Bahraini Foreign Minister Dr. Abdullatif bin Rashid Al Zayani, Egyptian Foreign Minister Sameh Shoukry, Moroccan Foreign Minister Nasser Bourita, and UAE Foreign Minister Sheikh Abdullah bin Zayed Al Nahyan at the Negev Summit in Sde Boker, March 2022
23	Palestinian National Authority	Ramallah	March 26–27, 2022	Met with President Mahmoud Abbas.	Secretary Blinken with Palestinian Authority President Mahmoud Abbas in Ramallah, March 2022
23	Morocco	Rabat	March 28–29, 2022	Met with Foreign Minister Nasser Bourita, and granted an interview to Medi 1 TV. Also met Crown Prince of Abu Dhabi Sheikh Mohammed bin Zayed Al Nahyan.	Secretary Blinken with Moroccan Foreign Minister Nasser Bourita in Rabat, March 2022
23	Algeria	Algiers	March 30, 2022	Met with President Abdelmadjid Tebboune and Foreign Minister Ramtane Lamamra.	Secretary Blinken with Algerian President Abdelmadjid Tebboune in Algiers, March 2022
24	Belgium	Brussels	April 5–7, 2022	Attended the NATO Foreign Ministerial and a G7 ministerial meeting.	Secretary Blinken with G7 Foreign Ministers at the NATO Foreign Ministerial in Brussels, April 2022
25	Panama	Panama City	April 19–20, 2022	Co-hosted a Ministerial Conference on Migration and Protection with the Government of Panama, alongside Secretary of Homeland Security Alejandro Mayorkas. Met with President Laurentino Cortizo, Foreign Minister Erika Mouynes and Public Security Minister Juan Manuel Pino Forero. Also visited the Panama Canal.	Secretary Blinken participates in a Ministerial Conference on Migration and Protection Plenary Session in Panama City, Panama, April 2022
26	Ukraine	Kyiv	April 24, 2022	Traveled with Defense Secretary Austin. Met with President Volodymyr Zelenskyy, Foreign Minister Dmytro Kuleba, Defense Minister Oleksii Reznikov, Head of Presidential Administration Andriy Yermak, General Valerii Zaluzhnyi and Ambassador Oksana Markarova. Discussed providing weapons during the ongoing Russian invasion of Ukraine.	Secretary Blinken and Defense Secretary Austin with Ukrainian President Volodymyr Zelenskyy in Kyiv, April 2022
26	Poland	Warsaw; Hrebenne	April 25, 2022	Held a press conference with Defense Secretary Austin.	Secretary Blinken and Defense Secretary Austin hold a press conference in Poland, April 2022
27	Germany	Berlin	May 14, 2022	Attended an informal meeting of NATO Foreign Ministers.	Secretary Blinken with NATO Foreign Ministers in Berlin, May 2022
27	France	Paris	May 15, 2022	Met with Foreign Minister Jean-Yves Le Drian. Attended the second ministerial meeting of the U.S.-E.U. Trade and Technology Council, alongside U.S. Trade Representative Katherine Tai and Secretary of Commerce Gina Raimondo.	Secretary Blinken participates in a U.S.-EU Trade and Technology Council working dinner in Paris, May 2022
27	United Arab Emirates	Abu Dhabi	May 16, 2022	Joined Vice President Harris as part of the Presidential Delegation to offer condolences on behalf of the United States for the passing of His Highness Sheikh Khalifa bin Zayed Al Nahyan.	Secretary Blinken with Vice President Kamala Harris and UAE President Sheikh Mohammed bin Zayed in Abu Dhabi, May 2022
28	Japan	Tokyo	May 21–24, 2022	Accompanied President Biden to the Quad Leaders’ Summit. Met with Japanese Foreign Minister Yoshimasa Hayashi and Australian Foreign Minister Penny Wong.	Secretary Blinken with Japanese Foreign Minister Hayashi Yoshimasa in Tokyo, May 2022
29	Germany	Berlin; Schloss Elmau	June 23–28, 2022	Attended the Berlin Ministerial Conference “Uniting for Global Food Security”. Accompanied President Biden to the G7 summit.	Secretary Blinken with German Foreign Minister Annalena Baerbock in Berlin, June 2022
29	Spain	Madrid	June 28–30, 2022	Accompanied President Biden to the 32nd NATO Summit.	Secretary Blinken with President Biden, South Korean President Yoon Suk-yeol and Japanese Prime Minister Fumio Kishida at the NATO summit in Madrid, June 2022
30	Indonesia	Nusa Dua	July 7–9, 2022	Attended the G20 Foreign Ministers' Meeting. Met with Foreign Minister Retno Marsudi and Chinese Foreign Minister Wang Yi.	Secretary Blinken with Indonesian Foreign Minister Retno Marsudi in Bali, July 2022
30	Thailand	Bangkok	July 9–10, 2022	Met with Prime Minister Prayut Chan-o-cha and Foreign Minister Don Pramudwinai.	Secretary Blinken with Thai Foreign Minister Don Pramudwinai in Bangkok, July 2022
30	Japan	Tokyo	July 11, 2022	Offered condolences to the Japanese people after the death of former Prime Minister Shinzo Abe. Met with Prime Minister Fumio Kishida.	Secretary Blinken with Japanese Prime Minister Fumio Kishida in Tokyo, July 2022
31	Israel	Tel Aviv; Jerusalem	July 13–15, 2022	Accompanied President Biden.	Secretary Blinken with Israeli Prime Minister Yair Lapid in Jerusalem, July 2022
31	Palestinian National Authority	East Jerusalem, Bethlehem	July 15, 2022	Accompanied President Biden.	
31	Saudi Arabia	Jeddah	July 15–16, 2022	Accompanied President Biden.	Secretary Blinken with President Biden and Egyptian President Abdel Fattah el-Sisi in Jeddah, July 2022
32	Cambodia	Phnom Penh	August 3–5, 2022	Attended the U.S.–ASEAN Ministerial Meeting, the East Asia Summit Foreign Ministers' Meeting, and the ASEAN Regional Forum. Met with Prime Minister Hun Sen and Foreign Minister Prak Sokhonn. Engaged with alumni of the Young Southeast Asian Leaders Initiative.	Secretary Blinken participates in an ASEAN-U.S. Ministerial in Phnom Penh, August 2022
32	Philippines	Manila; Makati	August 5–6, 2022	Met with President Bongbong Marcos at Malacañang Palace. Met virtually with Foreign Secretary Enrique Manalo from The Peninsula Manila. Attended a COVID-19 vaccine distribution ceremony by USAID at the Manila Zoo with Health Secretary Maria Rosario Vergeire and Mayor of Manila Honey Lacuna. Visited a renewable energy fair at the Ayala Triangle Gardens.	Secretary Blinken with Philippine President Bongbong Marcos in Manila, August 2022
32	South Africa	Pretoria; Johannesburg	August 7–9, 2022	Launched the U.S. Strategy for Sub-Saharan Africa and attended the U.S.–South Africa Strategic Dialogue in Pretoria. Met with President Cyril Ramaphosa and Foreign Minister Naledi Pandor. Participated in the National Women's Day celebration in Johannesburg.	Secretary Blinken with South African President Cyril Ramaphosa in Pretoria, August 2022
32	Democratic Republic of the Congo	Kinshasa	August 9–10, 2022	Met with President Félix Tshisekedi, Prime Minister Jean-Michel Sama Lukonde and Foreign Minister Christophe Lutundula.	Secretary Blinken with DRC Prime Minister Jean-Michel Sama Lukonde in Kinshasa, August 2022
32	Rwanda	Kigali	August 10–11, 2022	Met with President Paul Kagame and Foreign Minister Vincent Biruta. Visited the Kigali Genocide Memorial.	Secretary Blinken with Rwandan Foreign Minister Vincent Biruta in Kigali, August 2022
33	Ukraine	Kyiv, Irpin	September 8, 2022	Met with President Volodymyr Zelenskyy and Foreign Minister Dmytro Kuleba.	Secretary Blinken with Ukrainian President Volodymyr Zelenskyy in Kyiv, August 2022
33	Belgium	Brussels	September 9, 2022	Met with NATO Secretary General Jens Stoltenberg and the North Atlantic Council.	Secretary Blinken with NATO Secretary General Jens Stoltenberg in Brussels, September 2022
34	Mexico	Mexico City	September 12, 2022	Met with President Andrés Manuel López Obrador and Foreign Secretary Marcelo Ebrard. Attended the U.S.–Mexico High Level Economic Dialogue alongside Secretary of Commerce Gina Raimondo with Mexican counterparts.	Secretary Blinken participates in the 2022 U.S.-Mexico High-Level Economic Dialogue in Mexico City, September 2022
35	Colombia	Bogotá	October 3–4, 2022	Met with President Gustavo Petro, Vice President Francia Márquez and Foreign Minister Álvaro Leyva.	Secretary Blinken with Colombian President Gustavo Petro, Vice President Francia Márquez and Foreign Minister Álvaro Leyva in Bogotá, October 2022
35	Chile	Santiago	October 4–5, 2022	Met with President Gabriel Boric and Foreign Minister Antonia Urrejola.	Secretary Blinken with Chilean President Gabriel Boric in Santiago, October 2022
35	Peru	Lima	October 5–7, 2022	Attended the General Assembly of the Organization of American States. Met with OAS Secretary General Luis Almagro, President Pedro Castillo and Foreign Minister César Landa.	Secretary Blinken with Peruvian President Pedro Castillo and Foreign Minister Cesar Landa in Lima, October 2022
36	Canada	Ottawa; Montreal	October 27–28, 2022	Met with Prime Minister Justin Trudeau, Deputy Prime Minister Chrystia Freeland and Foreign Minister Mélanie Joly. Also met with Chairperson of the African Union Commission Moussa Faki.	Secretary Blinken with Canadian Prime Minister Justin Trudeau in Ottawa, October 2022
37	Germany	Münster	November 2–5, 2022	Attended a G7 Foreign Ministers’ meeting. Met with Kenyan Cabinet Secretary for Foreign Affairs Alfred Mutua and Ghanaian Foreign Minister Shirley Ayorkor Botchwey.	Secretary Blinken with G7 Foreign Ministers in Münster, November 2022
38	Egypt	Sharm El-Sheikh	November 11, 2022	Accompanied President Biden at the 2022 United Nations Climate Change Conference (COP27).	
38	Cambodia	Phnom Penh	November 12–13, 2022	Accompanied President Biden at the U.S.–ASEAN Summit and East Asia Summit. Met with Ukrainian Foreign Minister Dmytro Kuleba and Indian External Affairs Minister S. Jaishankar.	Secretary Blinken with Ukrainian Foreign Minister Dmytro Kuleba in Phnom Penh, November 2022
38	Indonesia	Bali	November 13–16, 2022	Accompanied President Biden at the G20 summit.	Secretary Blinken with President Biden in Bali, November 2022
38	Thailand	Bangkok	November 16–17, 2022	Accompanied Vice President Harris at the APEC Economic Leaders' Meeting. Attended the APEC ministerial meeting with foreign and trade ministers. Met with Foreign Minister Don Pramudwinai, Papua New Guinea Prime Minister James Marape and Vietnamese Foreign Minister Bùi Thanh Sơn.	Secretary Blinken with U.S. Trade Representative Katherine Tai in Bangkok, November 2022
39	Qatar	Doha, Al Rayyan	November 21, 2022	Met with Foreign Minister Mohammed bin Abdulrahman bin Jassim Al Thani. Attended the 2022 FIFA World Cup soccer match between the United States and Wales at Ahmad bin Ali Stadium.	Secretary Blinken with Qatari Deputy Prime Minister and Foreign Minister Mohammed bin Abdulrahman Al Thani in Doha, November 2022
40	Romania	Bucharest	November 28–30, 2022	Attended the NATO Foreign Ministers’ meeting. Met with President Klaus Iohannis, Prime Minister Nicolae Ciucă and Foreign Minister Bogdan Aurescu. Also met with NATO Secretary General Jens Stoltenberg, Slovak Foreign Minister Rastislav Káčer, Belgian Foreign Minister Hadja Lahbib and Ukrainian Foreign Minister Dmytro Kuleba.	Secretary Blinken with Romanian President Klaus Iohannis in Bucharest, November 2022
41	Mexico	Mexico City	January 8–10, 2023	Accompanied President Biden to the 10th North American Leaders' Summit. Met with Foreign Secretary Marcelo Ebrard and Canadian Foreign Minister Mélanie Joly.	Secretary Blinken with Mexican Foreign Secretary Marcelo Ebrard and Canadian Foreign Minister Mélanie Joly in Mexico City, January 2023
42	Egypt	Cairo	January 29–30, 2023	Met with President Abdel Fattah El-Sisi and Foreign Minister Sameh Shoukry.	Secretary Blinken with Egyptian Foreign Minister Sameh Shoukry in Cairo, January 2023
42	Israel	Jerusalem	January 30–31, 2023	Met with President Isaac Herzog, Prime Minister Benjamin Netanyahu, Foreign Minister Eli Cohen, Defense Minister Yoav Gallant and Opposition Leader Yair Lapid.	Secretary Blinken with Israeli Foreign Minister Eli Cohen in Jerusalem, January 2023
42	Palestinian National Authority	Ramallah	January 31, 2023	Met with President Mahmoud Abbas and Prime Minister Mohammad Shtayyeh.	Secretary Blinken with Palestinian Authority President Mahmoud Abbas in Ramallah, January 2023
43	Germany	Munich	February 17–19, 2023	Attended the Munich Security Conference. Met with G7 foreign ministers. Also met with Yemeni President Rashad al-Alimi, Iraqi Prime Minister Mohammed Shia' Al Sudani, Moldovan President Maia Sandu, Serbian President Aleksandar Vučić, Armenian Prime Minister Nikol Pashinyan, Azerbaijani President Ilham Aliyev, Ukrainian Foreign Minister Dmytro Kuleba, South Korean Foreign Minister Park Jin and Chinese State Councilor Wang Yi.	Secretary Blinken with German Foreign Minister Annalena Baerbock and Ukrainian Foreign Minister Dmytro Kuleba at the Munich Security Conference, February 2023
43	Turkey	Incirlik Air Base, Ankara	February 19–20, 2023	Toured earthquake damage over Hatay Province. Met with USAID urban search and rescue teams and White Helmets. Met with Turkish President Recep Tayyip Erdoğan and Turkish Foreign Minister Mevlüt Çavuşoğlu.	Secretary Blinken with Turkish Foreign Minister Mevlüt Çavuşoğlu over Hatay Province, February 2023
43	Greece	Athens	February 20–21, 2023	Met with Prime Minister Kyriakos Mitsotakis and Foreign Minister Nikos Dendias.	Secretary Blinken with Greek Foreign Minister Nikos Dendias in Athens, February 2023
44	Kazakhstan	Astana	February 27–28, 2023	Attended the C5+1 ministerial meeting. Met with President Kassym-Jomart Tokayev and Foreign Minister Mukhtar Tleuberdi. Also met with Kyrgyz Foreign Minister Jeenbek Kulubayev, Turkmen Foreign Minister Raşit Meredow, and Tajik Foreign Minister Sirojiddin Muhriddin.	Secretary Blinken with C5+1 Foreign Ministers in Astana, February 2023
44	Uzbekistan	Tashkent	February 28–March 1, 2023	Met with President Shavkat Mirziyoyev and Foreign Minister Bakhtiyor Saidov.	Secretary Blinken with Uzbek President Shavkat Mirziyoyev in Tashkent, March 2023
44	India	New Delhi	March 1–3, 2023	Attended the G20 foreign ministers' meeting, Quad foreign ministers' meeting and the Raisina Dialogue. Met with External Affairs Minister S. Jaishankar.	Secretary Blinken with Quad Foreign Ministers in New Delhi, March 2023
45	Ethiopia	Addis Ababa	March 14–16, 2023	Met with Prime Minister Abiy Ahmed and Deputy Prime Minister and Foreign Minister Demeke Mekonnen. Also met with Chairperson of the African Union Commission Moussa Faki.	
45	Niger	Niamey	March 16–17, 2023	Met with President Mohamed Bazoum and Foreign Minister Hassoumi Massaoudou.	Secretary Blinken with Nigerien Foreign Minister Hassoumi Massoudou in Niamey, March 2023
46	Canada	Ottawa	March 23–24, 2023	Accompanied President Biden.	Secretary Blinken with President Biden in Ottawa, March 2023
47	Belgium	Brussels	April 3–4, 2023	Met with NATO Secretary General Jens Stoltenberg, EU High Representative Josep Borrell, Ukrainian Foreign Minister Dmytro Kuleba and New Zealand Foreign Minister Nanaia Mahuta. Also attended a ceremony marking Finland's accession to NATO, the NATO foreign ministerial and the U.S.–EU Energy Council.	Secretary Blinken with NATO foreign ministers in Brussels, April 2023
48	United Kingdom	Belfast	April 11–12, 2023	Accompanied President Biden.	
48	Ireland	Dublin	April 12–13, 2023	Accompanied President Biden.	Secretary Blinken at the Houses of the Oireachtas in Dublin, Ireland, April 2023
48	Vietnam	Hanoi	April 14–16, 2023	Met with General Secretary Nguyễn Phú Trọng, Prime Minister Phạm Minh Chính and Foreign Minister Bùi Thanh Sơn.	
48	Japan	Tokyo, Karuizawa	April 16–18, 2023	Attended the G7 Foreign Ministers' meeting. Also met with Prime Minister Fumio Kishida.	Secretary Blinken with G7 Foreign Ministers in Karuizawa, April 2023
49	Japan	Hiroshima	May 18–21, 2023	Accompanied President Biden to the 49th G7 summit. Also met with Foreign Minister Yoshimasa Hayashi and South Korean Foreign Minister Park Jin.	Secretary Blinken with President Biden and Japanese Prime Minister Fumio Kishida in Hiroshima, May 2023
49	Papua New Guinea	Port Moresby	May 21–22, 2023	Met with Pacific Islands Forum leaders, Prime Minister James Marape and New Zealand Prime Minister Chris Hipkins.	Secretary Blinken with Papua New Guinean Prime Minister James Marape in Port Moresby, May 2023
50	Sweden	Luleå	May 30–31, 2023	Met with Prime Minister Ulf Kristersson and Foreign Minister Tobias Billström. Also co-chaired the 4th ministerial meeting of the U.S.-EU Trade and Technology Council.	Secretary Blinken at a U.S.-E.U. Trade and Technology Council ministerial meeting in Luleå, May 2023
50	Norway	Oslo	May 31–June 1, 2023	Met with Prime Minister Jonas Gahr Støre, Foreign Minister Anniken Huitfeldt and NATO Secretary General Jens Stoltenberg. Also attended an informal meeting of NATO Foreign Ministers.	Secretary Blinken with Norwegian Foreign Minister Anniken Huitfeldt in Oslo, June 2023
50	Finland	Helsinki	June 1–2, 2023	Met with Prime Minister Sanna Marin and Foreign Minister Pekka Haavisto.	Secretary Blinken with Finnish Prime Minister Sanna Marin in Helsinki, June 2023
51	Saudi Arabia	Jeddah, Riyadh	June 6–8, 2023	Met with Crown Prince Mohammed bin Salman and Foreign Minister Faisal bin Farhan Al Saud. Also attended a U.S.-Gulf Cooperation Council ministerial and co-hosted a Global Coalition to Defeat ISIS ministerial meeting.	Secretary Blinken with Saudi Foreign Minister Faisal bin Farhan in Riyadh, June 2023
52	China	Beijing	June 18–19, 2023	Met with Foreign Minister Qin Gang, CCP Foreign Affairs Commission Office director Wang Yi and President & CCP General Secretary Xi Jinping.	Secretary Blinken with Chinese Foreign Minister Qin Gang in Beijing, June 2023
52	United Kingdom	London	June 20–21, 2023	Attended the Ukraine Recovery Conference. Met with Foreign Secretary James Cleverly, Ukrainian Prime Minister Denys Shmyhal, Ukrainian Foreign Minister Dmytro Kuleba and Turkish Foreign Minister Hakan Fidan.	Secretary Blinken with British Prime Minister Rishi Sunak at the Ukraine Recovery Conference in London, June 2023
53	Trinidad and Tobago	Port of Spain	July 5–6, 2023	Participated in the Caribbean Community (CARICOM) Heads of Government meeting and the 50th Anniversary of CARICOM celebration. Met with Prime Minister Keith Rowley, Haitian Prime Minister Ariel Henry, and Dominican Prime Minister Roosevelt Skerrit.	Secretary Blinken with Trinidad and Tobago Prime Minister Keith Rowley in Port of Spain, July 2023
53	Guyana	Georgetown	July 6, 2023	Met with President Mohamed Irfaan Ali and Foreign Minister Hugh Todd.	Secretary Blinken with Guyanese President Irfaan Ali in Georgetown, July 2023
54	United Kingdom	London	July 9–10, 2023	Accompanied President Biden.	
54	Lithuania	Vilnius	July 10–12, 2023	Accompanied President Biden to the 33rd NATO summit.	Secretary Blinken with NATO leaders in Vilnius, Lithuania, July 2023
54	Indonesia	Jakarta	July 13–15, 2023	Attended the annual U.S.–ASEAN Foreign Ministers’ Meeting, East Asia Summit Foreign Ministers’ Meeting, and ASEAN Regional Forum. Met with Foreign Minister Retno Marsudi, CCP Foreign Affairs Commission Office director Wang Yi, Japanese Foreign Minister Yoshimasa Hayashi and South Korean Foreign Minister Park Jin.	
55	Tonga	Nukuʻalofa	July 26, 2023	Met with Prime Minister Hu‘akavameiliku and Foreign Minister Fekitamoeloa ʻUtoikamanu. Dedicated the new U.S. Embassy.	Secretary Blinken with Tongan Prime Minister Hu'akavameiliku in Nukuʻalofa, July 2023
55	New Zealand	Wellington	July 26–27, 2023	Met with Prime Minister Chris Hipkins and Foreign Minister Nanaia Mahuta. Also met with the U.S. Women's National Team and attended the 2023 FIFA Women's World Cup match between the United States and the Netherlands.	Secretary Blinken with New Zealand Foreign Minister Nanaia Mahuta in Wellington, July 2023
55	Australia	Brisbane	July 27–29, 2023	Attended the Australia–U.S. Ministerial Consultations (AUSMIN) with Defense Secretary Austin. Met with Prime Minister Anthony Albanese and Foreign Minister Penny Wong.	Secretary Blinken and Defense Secretary Austin with Australian Prime Minister Anthony Albanese, Defence Minister Richard Marles and Foreign Minister Penny Wong in Brisbane, July 2023
56	Ukraine	Kyiv, Yahidne	September 6–7, 2023	Met with President Volodymyr Zelenskyy, Prime Minister Denys Shmyhal and Foreign Minister Dmytro Kuleba.	Secretary Blinken with Ukrainian Foreign Minister Dmytro Kuleba at Berkovetske cemetery in Kyiv, September 2023
56	India	New Delhi	September 8–10, 2023	Accompanied President Biden to the G20 summit.	Secretary Blinken with President Biden and Indian Prime Minister Narendra Modi in New Delhi, September 2023
56	Vietnam	Hanoi	September 10–11, 2023	Accompanied President Biden.	Secretary Blinken with President Biden and Vietnamese General Secretary Nguyễn Phú Trọng in Hanoi, September 2023
57	Mexico	Mexico City	October 4–5, 2023	Met with President Andrés Manuel López Obrador and Foreign Secretary Alicia Bárcena Ibarra. Attended the U.S.–Mexico High Level Security Dialogue alongside Attorney General Merrick Garland, Secretary of Homeland Security Alejandro Mayorkas and Homeland Security Advisor Elizabeth Sherwood-Randall with Mexican counterparts.	Secretary Blinken at the U.S.–Mexico High Level Security Dialogue in Mexico City, October 2023
58	Israel	Tel Aviv	October 12, 2023	Met with President Isaac Herzog and Prime Minister Benjamin Netanyahu.	Secretary Blinken with Israeli President Isaac Herzog in Tel Aviv, October 2023
58	Jordan	Amman	October 12–13, 2023	Met with King Abdullah II and Palestinian Authority President Mahmoud Abbas.	Secretary Blinken with Palestinian Authority President Mahmoud Abbas in Amman, October 2023
58	Qatar	Doha	October 13, 2023	Met with Emir Tamim bin Hamad Al Thani and Prime Minister and Foreign Minister Mohammed bin Abdulrahman bin Jassim Al Thani.	Secretary Blinken with Qatari Emir Sheikh Tamim bin Hamad Al Thani in Doha, October 2023
58	Bahrain	Manama	October 13, 2023	Met with Crown Prince-Prime Minister Salman bin Hamad Al Khalifa.	Secretary Blinken with Bahraini Foreign Minister Abdullatif bin Rashid Al Zayani in Manama, October 2023
58	Saudi Arabia	Riyadh	October 13–15, 2023	Met with Foreign Minister Prince Faisal bin Farhan Al Saud and Crown Prince and Prime Minister Mohammed bin Salman.	Secretary Blinken with Saudi Foreign Minister Prince Faisal bin Farhan Al Saud in Riyadh, October 2023
58	United Arab Emirates	Abu Dhabi	October 14, 2023	Met with President Sheikh Mohamed bin Zayed Al Nahyan.	Secretary Blinken with UAE President Sheikh Mohamed bin Zayed Al Nahyan in Abu Dhabi, October 2023
58	Egypt	Cairo	October 15, 2023	Met with President Abdel Fattah el-Sisi.	Secretary Blinken in Cairo, October 2023
58	Jordan	Amman	October 15–16, 2023	Met hybridly with employees and families of U.S. Missions Israel, Jordan, Qatar, Bahrain, Saudi Arabia, the United Arab Emirates, and Egypt.	
58	Israel	Tel Aviv, Jerusalem	October 16–17, 2023	Met with President Isaac Herzog, Prime Minister Benjamin Netanyahu, Defense Minister Yoav Gallant and the war cabinet.	Secretary Blinken with Israeli Defense Minister Yoav Gallant in Tel Aviv, October 2023
58	Jordan	Amman	October 17, 2023	Met with Palestinian Authority President Mahmoud Abbas.	
58	Israel	Tel Aviv	October 18, 2023	Accompanied President Biden on his travel to Israel.	Secretary Blinken with President Biden Israeli President Isaac Herzog in Tel Aviv, October 2023
59	Israel	Tel Aviv	November 3, 2023	Met with President Isaac Herzog, Prime Minister Benjamin Netanyahu, Minister Benny Gantz and Opposition Leader Yair Lapid.	Secretary Blinken with Israeli Prime Minister Benjamin Netanyahu in Tel Aviv, November 2023
59	Jordan	Amman	November 3–5, 2023	Met with King Abdullah II, Foreign Minister Ayman Safadi, Lebanese Prime Minister Najib Mikati, Qatari Prime Minister Mohammed bin Abdulrahman Al Thani, Egyptian Foreign Minister Sameh Shoukry, Saudi Foreign Minister Faisal bin Farhan Al Saud, UAE Foreign Minister Abdullah bin Zayed Al Nahyan, PLO Secretary General Hussein al-Sheikh and UNRWA Commissioner-General Philippe Lazzarini.	Secretary Blinken with regional foreign ministers in Amman, November 2023
59	Palestinian National Authority	Ramallah	November 5, 2023	Met with President Mahmoud Abbas.	Secretary Blinken with Palestinian Authority President Mahmoud Abbas in Ramallah, November 2023
59	Cyprus	Larnaca	November 5, 2023	Met with President Nikos Christodoulides.	Secretary Blinken with Republic of Cyprus President Nikos Christodoulides at Larnaca Airport, November 2023
59	Iraq	Baghdad	November 5, 2023	Met with Prime Minister Mohammed Shia' Al Sudani.	Secretary Blinken with Iraqi Prime Minister Mohammed Shia' Al Sudani in Baghdad, November 2023
59	Turkey	Ankara	November 6, 2023	Met with Foreign Minister Hakan Fidan.	Secretary Blinken with Turkish Foreign Minister Hakan Fidan in Ankara, November 2023
59	Japan	Tokyo	November 7–8, 2023	Attended the G7 Foreign Ministers' meeting. Met with Prime Minister Fumio Kishida and Foreign Minister Yōko Kamikawa.	Secretary Blinken with G7 foreign ministers in Tokyo, November 2023
59	South Korea	Seoul	November 8–9, 2023	Met with President Yoon Suk Yeol, National Security Advisor Cho Tae-yong and Foreign Minister Park Jin.	Secretary Blinken with South Korean Foreign Minister Park Jin in Seoul, November 2023
59	India	New Delhi	November 9–10, 2023	Met with Prime Minister Narendra Modi and External Affairs Minister S. Jaishankar. Participated in the 2+2 Ministerial Dialogue with Defense Secretary Austin.	Secretary Blinken and Defense Secretary Austin with Indian External Affairs Minister S. Jaishankar and Defense Minister Rajnath Singh at the 2+2 Ministerial Dialogue in New Delhi, November 2023
60	Belgium	Brussels	November 27–29, 2023	Attended the NATO Foreign Ministers' meeting. Met with NATO Secretary General Jens Stoltenberg, Norwegian Foreign Minister Espen Barth Eide, Turkish Foreign Minister Hakan Fidan and Ukrainian Foreign Minister Dmytro Kuleba.	Secretary Blinken with NATO foreign ministers in Brussels, Belgium, November 2023
60	North Macedonia	Skopje	November 29, 2023	Attended the OSCE Ministerial Council. Met with Prime Minister Dimitar Kovačevski and Foreign Minister Bujar Osmani.	Secretary Blinken with North Macedonia Prime Minister Dimitar Kovačevski in Skopje, November 2023
60	Israel	Tel Aviv, Jerusalem	November 30, 2023	Met with President Isaac Herzog, Prime Minister Benjamin Netanyahu, Opposition Leader Yair Lapid, Defense Minister Yoav Gallant and Minister Benny Gantz.	Secretary Blinken with Israeli President Isaac Herzog in Tel Aviv, November 2023
60	Palestinian National Authority	Ramallah	November 30, 2023	Met with President Mahmoud Abbas.	Secretary Blinken with Palestinian Authority President Mahmoud Abbas in Ramallah, November 2023
60	United Arab Emirates	Dubai	December 1, 2023	Attended the 2023 United Nations Climate Change Conference (COP28).	Secretary Blinken at COP28 in Dubai, December 2023
61	Mexico	Mexico City	December 27, 2023	Met with President Andrés Manuel López Obrador alongside Secretary of Homeland Security Alejandro Mayorkas and Homeland Security Advisor Elizabeth Sherwood-Randall.	Secretary Blinken with Mexican President Andrés Manuel López Obrador in Mexico City, December 2023
62	Turkey	Istanbul	January 5–6, 2024	Met with President Recep Tayyip Erdoğan and Foreign Minister Hakan Fidan.	Secretary Blinken with Turkish President Recep Tayyip Erdoğan in Istanbul, January 2024
62	Greece	Crete	January 6, 2024	Met with Prime Minister Kyriakos Mitsotakis.	Secretary Blinken with Greek Prime Minister Kyriakos Mitsotakis in Crete, January 2024
62	Jordan	Amman	January 6–7, 2024	Met with King Abdullah II and Foreign Minister Ayman Safadi.	Secretary Blinken with Jordanian Foreign Minister Ayman Safadi in Amman, January 2024
62	Qatar	Doha	January 7, 2024	Met with Emir Tamim bin Hamad Al Thani and Prime Minister and Foreign Minister Mohammed bin Abdulrahman bin Jassim Al Thani.	Secretary Blinken with Qatari Prime Minister and Foreign Minister Mohammed bin Abdulrahman Al Thani in Doha, January 2024
62	United Arab Emirates	Abu Dhabi	January 7–8, 2024	Met with President Sheikh Mohamed bin Zayed Al Nahyan.	Secretary Blinken with UAE President Sheikh Mohamed bin Zayed Al Nahyan in Abu Dhabi, January 2024
62	Saudi Arabia	Al-'Ula	January 8, 2024	Met with Crown Prince and Prime Minister Mohammed bin Salman.	Secretary Blinken with Saudi Crown Prince and Prime Minister Mohammed bin Salman in Al-'Ula, January 2024
62	Israel	Tel Aviv	January 8–11, 2024	Met with President Isaac Herzog, Prime Minister Benjamin Netanyahu, Foreign Minister Israel Katz, Defense Minister Yoav Gallant, Minister Benny Gantz and the war cabinet.	Secretary Blinken with Israeli Foreign Minister Israel Katz in Tel Aviv, January 2024
62	Palestinian National Authority	Ramallah	January 10, 2024	Met with President Mahmoud Abbas.	Secretary Blinken with Palestinian Authority President Mahmoud Abbas in Ramallah, January 2024
62	Bahrain	Manama	January 10, 2024	Met with King Hamad bin Isa Al Khalifa.	Secretary Blinken with King Hamad bin Isa Al Khalifa in Manama, January 2024
62	Egypt	Cairo	January 11, 2024	Met with President Abdel Fattah el-Sisi.	Secretary Blinken with Egyptian President Abdel Fattah el-Sisi in Cairo, January 2024
63	Switzerland	Davos	January 15–17, 2024	Attended the World Economic Forum annual meeting. Met with President Viola Amherd, Ukrainian President Volodymyr Zelenskyy, Rwandan President Paul Kagame, Kurdistan Region Prime Minister Masrour Barzani, European Commission President Ursula von der Leyen, UN Secretary-General António Guterres, German Foreign Minister Annalena Baerbock and UK Foreign Secretary David Cameron.	Secretary Blinken at the World Economic Forum in Davos, January 2024
64	Cabo Verde	Praia	January 22, 2024	Met with Prime Minister Ulisses Correia e Silva.	Secretary Blinken with Cabo Verdean Prime Minister Ulisses Correia e Silva in Praia, January 2024
64	Côte d’Ivoire	Abidjan	January 22–23, 2024	Met with President Alassane Ouattara, Foreign Minister Kacou Houadja Léon Adom and African Development Bank President Akinwumi Adesina. Attended the 2023 Africa Cup of Nations match between Côte d’Ivoire and Equatorial Guinea at Alassane Ouattara Stadium.	Secretary Blinken with Ivorian President Alassane Ouattara in Abidjan, January 2024
64	Nigeria	Abuja, Lagos	January 23–24, 2024	Met with President Bola Tinubu and Foreign Minister Yusuf Tuggar.	Secretary Blinken with Nigerian President Bola Tinubu in Abuja, January 2024
64	Angola	Luanda	January 24–25, 2024	Met with President João Lourenço and Foreign Minister Tete António.	Secretary Blinken with Angolan President João Lourenço in Luanda, January 2024
65	Saudi Arabia	Riyadh	February 5–6, 2024	Met with Crown Prince and Prime Minister Mohammed bin Salman and Foreign Minister Prince Faisal bin Farhan Al Saud.	Secretary Blinken with Saudi Crown Prince and Prime Minister Mohammed bin Salman in Riyadh, February 2024
65	Egypt	Cairo	February 6, 2024	Met with President Abdel Fattah el-Sisi.	Secretary Blinken with Egyptian President Abdel Fattah el-Sisi in Cairo, February 2024
65	Qatar	Doha	February 6, 2024	Met with Emir Tamim bin Hamad Al Thani and Prime Minister and Foreign Minister Mohammed bin Abdulrahman bin Jassim Al Thani.	Secretary Blinken with Qatari Emir Sheikh Tamim bin Hamad Al Thani in Doha, February 2024
65	Israel	Jerusalem, Tel Aviv	February 6–8, 2024	Met with President Isaac Herzog, Prime Minister Benjamin Netanyahu, Defense Minister Yoav Gallant, Ministers Benny Gantz, Gadi Eisenkot and Opposition Leader Yair Lapid.	Secretary Blinken with Israeli Prime Minister Benjamin Netanyahu in Jerusalem, February 2024
65	Palestinian National Authority	Ramallah	February 7, 2024	Met with President Mahmoud Abbas.	Secretary Blinken with Palestinian Authority President Mahmoud Abbas in Ramallah, February 2024
66	Albania	Tirana	February 15, 2024	Met with President Bajram Begaj and Prime Minister Edi Rama.	Secretary Blinken with Albanian Prime Minister Edi Rama in Tirana, February 2024
66	Germany	Munich	February 15–17, 2024	Attended the Munich Security Conference. Met with G7 foreign ministers. Also met with Vice Chancellor Robert Habeck, Israeli President Isaac Herzog, Azerbaijani President Ilham Aliyev, Armenian Prime Minister Nikol Pashinyan, Bulgarian Prime Minister Nikolai Denkov, Ukrainian Foreign Minister Dmytro Kuleba, CCP Foreign Affairs Commission Office director Wang Yi and Indian External Affairs Minister S. Jaishankar.	Secretary Blinken with German Foreign Minister Annalena Baerbock and Indian External Affairs Minister S. Jaishankar at the Munich Security Conference, February 2024
67	Brazil	Brasília, Rio de Janeiro	February 20–22, 2024	Met with President Luiz Inácio Lula da Silva. Attended the G20 Foreign Ministers Meeting.	Secretary Blinken at the G20 Foreign Ministers Meeting in Rio de Janeiro, February 2024
67	Argentina	Buenos Aires	February 22–23, 2024	Met with President Javier Milei and Foreign Minister Diana Mondino.	Secretary Blinken with Argentine President Javier Milei in Buenos Aires, February 2024
68	Jamaica	Kingston	March 11, 2024	Attended a high-level meeting on Haiti convened by the Conference of the Heads of Government of the Caribbean Community (CARICOM). Met with Prime Minister Andrew Holness.	Secretary Blinken with Guyanese President Irfaan Ali and Jamaican Prime Minister Andrew Holness at the Conference of the Heads of Government of the Caribbean Community in Kingston, March 2024
69	Austria	Vienna	March 15–16, 2024	Attended the United Nations Commission on Narcotic Drugs. Met with IAEA Director General Rafael Grossi, President Alexander Van der Bellen, Chancellor Karl Nehammer and Foreign Minister Alexander Schallenberg.	Secretary Blinken with Austrian President Alexander Van der Bellen in Vienna, March 2024
69	Bahrain	Manama	March 16, 2024	Met with Crown Prince-Prime Minister Salman bin Hamad Al Khalifa.	Secretary Blinken with Bahraini Prime Minister and Crown Prince Salman bin Hamad Al Khalifa in Manama, March 2024
69	South Korea	Seoul	March 17–18, 2024	Attended the third Summit for Democracy. Met with President Yoon Suk Yeol and Foreign Minister Cho Tae-yul.	Secretary Blinken at the third Summit for Democracy in Seoul, March 2024
69	Philippines	Manila, Muntinlupa	March 19–20, 2024	Met with President Bongbong Marcos and Foreign Secretary Enrique Manalo. Visited an Amkor Technology manufacturing facility.	Secretary Blinken with Philippine President Bongbong Marcos in Manila, March 2024
69	Saudi Arabia	Jeddah	March 20–21, 2024	Met with Crown Prince and Prime Minister Mohammed bin Salman and Foreign Minister Prince Faisal bin Farhan Al Saud.	Secretary Blinken with Saudi Foreign Minister Prince Faisal bin Farhan Al Saud in Jeddah, March 2024
69	Egypt	Cairo	March 21–22, 2024	Met with President Abdel Fattah el-Sisi and Foreign Minister Sameh Shoukry. Also met with PLO Secretary General Hussein al-Sheikh, Saudi Foreign Minister Faisal bin Farhan Al Saud, Qatari Foreign Minister Mohammed bin Abdulrahman Al Thani, Jordanian Foreign Minister Ayman Safadi and UAE International Cooperation Minister Reem Al Hashimy.	Secretary Blinken with Egyptian President Abdel Fattah el-Sisi in Cairo, March 2024
69	Israel	Tel Aviv	March 22, 2024	Met with Prime Minister Benjamin Netanyahu and the war cabinet.	Secretary Blinken with Israeli Prime Minister Benjamin Netanyahu and the war cabinet in Tel Aviv, March 2024
70	France	Paris	April 2–3, 2024	Met with President Emmanuel Macron, Foreign Minister Stéphane Séjourné, Armed Forces Minister Sébastien Lecornu and UNESCO Director-General Audrey Azoulay.	Secretary Blinken with French Foreign Minister Stéphane Séjourné in Paris, April 2024
70	Belgium	Brussels, Leuven	April 3–5, 2024	Attended the NATO Foreign Ministers' meeting and the 6th U.S.-EU Trade and Technology Council. Met with NATO Secretary General Jens Stoltenberg, Ukrainian Foreign Minister Dmytro Kuleba, Finnish Foreign Minister Elina Valtonen, European Commission President Ursula von der Leyen and Armenian Prime Minister Nikol Pashinyan.	Secretary Blinken with Armenian Prime Minister Nikol Pashinyan, EU High Representative Josep Borrell and European Commission President Ursula von der Leyen in Brussels, April 2024
71	Italy	Capri	April 17–19, 2024	Attended the G7 Foreign Ministers' meeting. Met with Foreign Minister Antonio Tajani and Ukrainian Foreign Minister Dmytro Kuleba.	Secretary Blinken with G7 foreign ministers in Capri, April 2024
72	China	Shanghai, Beijing	April 24–26, 2024	Met with President & CCP General Secretary Xi Jinping, CCP Foreign Affairs Commission Office director Wang Yi, Public Security Minister Wang Xiaohong and Shanghai Party Secretary Chen Jining.	Secretary Blinken with CCP Foreign Affairs Commission Office director Wang Yi in Beijing, April 2024
73	Saudi Arabia	Riyadh	April 29–30, 2024	Attended a U.S.-Gulf Cooperation Council ministerial meeting and a World Economic Forum special meeting. Met with Crown Prince and Prime Minister Mohammed bin Salman, Foreign Minister Prince Faisal bin Farhan Al Saud, Turkish Foreign Minister Hakan Fidan, Qatari Foreign Minister Mohammed bin Abdulrahman Al Thani.	Secretary Blinken with Gulf Cooperation Council Foreign Ministers in Riyadh, April 2024
73	Jordan	Amman	April 30, 2024	Met with King Abdullah II, Foreign Minister Ayman Safadi and UN Senior Humanitarian and Reconstruction Coordinator for Gaza Sigrid Kaag.	Secretary Blinken with King Abdullah II in Amman, April 2024
73	Israel	Tel Aviv; Jerusalem; Kerem Shalom; Ashdod	April 30–May 1, 2024	Met with President Isaac Herzog, Prime Minister Benjamin Netanyahu and families of hostages held by Hamas. Visited the Kerem Shalom border crossing and the Port of Ashdod.	Secretary Blinken with Israeli Defense Minister Yoav Gallant and UN Senior Humanitarian and Reconstruction Coordinator for Gaza Sigrid Kaag at the Kerem Shalom border crossing in Israel, May 2024
74	Guatemala	Guatemala City	May 6, 2024	Met with President Bernardo Arévalo and other leaders from the Western Hemisphere.	Secretary Blinken at the Los Angeles Declaration on Migration and Protection ministerial in Guatemala City, May 2024
75	Ukraine	Kyiv	May 14–15, 2024	Met with President Volodymyr Zelenskyy, Prime Minister Denys Shmyhal and Foreign Minister Dmytro Kuleba.	Secretary Blinken with Ukrainian President Volodymyr Zelenskyy in Kyiv, May 2024
76	Moldova	Chișinău	May 29, 2024	Met with President Maia Sandu.	Secretary Blinken with Moldovan President Maia Sandu in Chisinau, May 2024
76	Czechia	Prague	May 29–31, 2024	Attended an informal meeting of NATO Foreign Ministers. Met with President Petr Pavel, Foreign Minister Jan Lipavský, Defense Minister Jana Černochová, NATO Secretary General Jens Stoltenberg and Turkish Foreign Minister Hakan Fidan.	Secretary Blinken with NATO Foreign Ministers in Prague, May 2024
77	France	Normandy, Paris	June 5–9, 2024	Accompanied President Biden on his state visit to France to commemorate the 80th anniversary of D-Day.	Secretary Blinken with President Biden at a ceremony marking the 80th anniversary of D-Day in Normandy, June 2024
77	Egypt	Cairo	June 10, 2024	Met with President Abdel Fattah el-Sisi.	Secretary Blinken with Egyptian President Abdel Fattah el-Sisi in Cairo, June 2024
77	Israel	Jerusalem, Tel Aviv	June 10–11, 2024	Met with President Isaac Herzog, Prime Minister Benjamin Netanyahu, Defense Minister Yoav Gallant, Opposition Leader Yair Lapid and Benny Gantz.	Secretary Blinken with Israeli President Isaac Herzog in Tel Aviv, June 2024
77	Jordan	Sweimeh	June 11–12, 2024	Attended a conference on the humanitarian response for Gaza. Met with King Abdullah II, Bahraini Foreign Minister Abdullatif bin Rashid Al Zayani, UAE Foreign Minister Abdullah bin Zayed Al Nahyan, Palestinian Authority Prime Minister Mohammad Mustafa, Indonesian President-elect Prabowo Subianto, Iraqi Prime Minister Mohammed Shia' Al Sudani and Malaysian Foreign Minister Mohamad Hasan.	Secretary Blinken at an international conference on the humanitarian response for Gaza in Sweimeh, June 2014
77	Qatar	Doha	June 12, 2024	Met with Emir Tamim bin Hamad Al Thani and Prime Minister and Foreign Minister Mohammed bin Abdulrahman bin Jassim Al Thani.	Secretary Blinken with Qatari Emir Sheikh Tamim bin Hamad Al Thani in Doha, June 2024
77	Italy	Fasano	June 13–14, 2024	Accompanied President Biden to the G7 summit.	Secretary Blinken with President Biden and Italian Prime Minister Giorgia Meloni in Fasano, June 2024
78	Laos	Vientiane	July 27, 2024	Attended the ASEAN-U.S. Post Ministerial Conference, East Asia Summit Foreign Ministers’ meeting, the ASEAN Regional Forum and the Mekong-U.S. Partnership Foreign Ministers' meeting. Met with Foreign Minister Saleumxay Kommasith, CCP Foreign Affairs Commission Office director Wang Yi and ASEAN Secretary-General Kao Kim Hourn.	Secretary Blinken with Laotian Deputy Prime Minister and Foreign Minister Saleumxay Kommasith in Vientiane, July 2024
78	Vietnam	Hanoi	July 27, 2024	Met with President Tô Lâm and Prime Minister Phạm Minh Chính. Offered condolences following the death of General Secretary Nguyễn Phú Trọng.	Secretary Blinken with Vietnamese President Tô Lâm in Hanoi, July 2024
78	Japan	Tokyo	July 28–29, 2024	Met with Foreign Minister Yōko Kamikawa and Defense Minister Minoru Kihara in a 2+2 ministerial dialogue with Defense Secretary Austin. Attended the Quad Foreign Ministers’ meeting.	Secretary Blinken and Defense Secretary Austin with Japanese Prime Minister Fumio Kishida, Foreign Minister Yōko Kamikawa and Defense Minister Minoru Kihara in Tokyo, July 2024
78	Philippines	Manila, Quezon City	July 29–30, 2024	Met with President Bongbong Marcos, Foreign Secretary Enrique Manalo, and Defense Secretary Gilbert Teodoro in a 2+2 ministerial dialogue with Defense Secretary Austin at Camp Aguinaldo.	Secretary Blinken and Defense Secretary Austin with Philippine President Bongbong Marcos in Manila, July 2024
78	Singapore	Singapore	July 30–31, 2024	Met with Prime Minister Lawrence Wong, Senior Minister Lee Hsien Loong and Foreign Minister Vivian Balakrishnan.	Secretary Blinken with Singaporean Prime Minister Lawrence Wong in Singapore, July 2024
78	Mongolia	Ulaanbaatar	August 1, 2024	Met with President Ukhnaagiin Khürelsükh, Prime Minister Luvsannamsrain Oyun-Erdene and Foreign Minister Battsetseg Batmunkh.	Secretary Blinken with Mongolian President Ukhnaagiin Khürelsükh in Ulaanbaatar, August 2024
79	Israel	Tel Aviv, Jerusalem	August 18–20, 2024	Met with President Isaac Herzog, Prime Minister Benjamin Netanyahu and Defense Minister Yoav Gallant.	Secretary Blinken with Israeli Prime Minister Benjamin Netanyahu in Jerusalem, August 2024
79	Egypt	El Alamein	August 20, 2024	Met with President Abdel Fattah el-Sisi and Foreign Minister Badr Abdelatty.	Secretary Blinken with Egyptian President Abdel Fattah el-Sisi in El Alamein, August 2024
79	Qatar	Doha	August 20, 2024	Met with Minister of State Mohammed bin Abdulaziz Al-Khulaifi.	Secretary Blinken with Qatari Minister of State Mohammed bin Abdulaziz Al-Khulaifi in Doha, August 2024
80	Haiti	Port-au-Prince	September 5, 2024	Met with Transitional Presidential Council Chairman Edgard Leblanc Fils and acting Prime Minister Garry Conille. Also met with the Multinational Security Support mission and the Haitian National Police.	Secretary Blinken with Haitian Prime Minister Garry Conille in Port-au-Prince, Haiti, September 2024
80	Dominican Republic	Santo Domingo	September 6, 2024	Met with President Luis Abinader.	Secretary Blinken with Dominican President Luis Abinader in Santo Domingo, September 2024
81	United Kingdom	London	September 9–10, 2024	Met with Prime Minister Keir Starmer and Foreign Secretary David Lammy. Opened the U.S.-UK Strategic Dialogue.	Secretary Blinken with British Foreign Secretary David Lammy in London, September 2024
81	Ukraine	Kyiv	September 11, 2024	Traveled with British Foreign Secretary David Lammy. Met with President Volodymyr Zelenskyy, Prime Minister Denys Shmyhal and Foreign Minister Andrii Sybiha. Attended the 4th Crimea Platform.	Secretary Blinken with Ukrainian Foreign Minister Andrii Sybiha and British Foreign Secretary David Lammy in Kyiv, September 2024
81	Poland	Warsaw	September 12, 2024	Met with President Andrzej Duda, Prime Minister Donald Tusk, Foreign Minister Radosław Sikorski and Warsaw Mayor Rafał Trzaskowski.	Secretary Blinken with Polish Prime Minister Donald Tusk in Warsaw, September 2024
82	Egypt	Cairo	September 18–19, 2024	Met with President Abdel Fattah el-Sisi. Co-chaired the opening of the U.S.-Egypt Strategic Dialogue with Foreign Minister Badr Abdelatty.	Secretary Blinken with Egyptian Foreign Minister Badr Abdelatty in Cairo, September 2024
82	France	Paris	September 19, 2024	Met with President Emmanuel Macron, Foreign Minister Stéphane Séjourné, Italian Foreign Minister Antonio Tajani and UK Foreign Secretary David Lammy.	Secretary Blinken with French Foreign Minister Stéphane Séjourné in Paris, September 2024
83	Laos	Vientiane	October 10–11, 2024	Attended the East Asia Summit and the U.S.-ASEAN Summit. Met with Thai Prime Minister Paetongtarn Shinawatra and Malaysian Prime Minister Anwar Ibrahim.	Secretary Blinken with Laotian Prime Minister Sonexay Siphandone at the East Asia Summit in Vientiane, October 2024
84	Germany	Berlin	October 17–18, 2024	Accompanied President Biden on his official visit to Germany. Met with Foreign Minister Annalena Baerbock.	
85	Israel	Jerusalem, Tel Aviv	October 22–23, 2024	Met with President Isaac Herzog, Prime Minister Benjamin Netanyahu, Defense Minister Yoav Gallant and Minister for Strategic Affairs Ron Dermer.	Secretary Blinken with Israeli Prime Minister Benjamin Netanyahu in Jerusalem, October 2024
85	Saudi Arabia	Riyadh	October 23–24, 2024	Met with Crown Prince and Prime Minister Mohammed bin Salman and Foreign Minister Prince Faisal bin Farhan Al Saud.	Secretary Blinken with Saudi Foreign Minister Prince Faisal bin Farhan Al Saud in Riyadh, October 2024
85	Qatar	Doha	October 24, 2024	Met with Emir Tamim bin Hamad Al Thani and Prime Minister and Foreign Minister Mohammed bin Abdulrahman bin Jassim Al Thani.	Secretary Blinken with Qatari Prime Minister and Foreign Minister Mohammed bin Abdulrahman bin Jassim Al Thani in Doha, October 2024
85	United Kingdom	London	October 25, 2024	Met with Lebanese Prime Minister Najib Mikati, Jordanian Foreign Minister Ayman Safadi and UAE Foreign Minister Abdullah bin Zayed Al Nahyan.	Secretary Blinken with Lebanese Prime Minister Najib Mikati in London, October 2024
86	Belgium	Brussels	November 13, 2024	Attended a meeting of the North Atlantic Council. Met with NATO Secretary General Mark Rutte, Ukrainian Foreign Minister Andrii Sybiha, EU High Representative Josep Borrell, High Representative-designate Kaja Kallas and UK Foreign Secretary David Lammy.	Secretary Blinken with NATO Secretary General Mark Rutte in Brussels, November 2024
86	Peru	Lima	November 14–17, 2024	Met with South Korean Foreign Minister Cho Tae-yul, Japanese Foreign Minister Takeshi Iwaya and Canadian Foreign Minister Mélanie Joly. Accompanied President Biden to the APEC Economic Leaders' meeting.	Secretary Blinken with Japanese Foreign Minister Takeshi Iwaya in Lima, November 2024
86	Brazil	Manaus, Rio de Janeiro	November 17–19, 2024	Accompanied President Biden to the G20 summit. Met with Saudi Foreign Minister Prince Faisal bin Farhan Al Saud, Egyptian Foreign Minister Badr Abdelatty and Turkish Foreign Minister Hakan Fidan.	
87	Italy	Rome, Anagni, Fiuggi	November 25–27, 2024	Visited the World Food Programme headquarters. Attended the G7 Foreign Ministers' meeting.	Secretary Blinken with G7 Foreign Ministers in Anagni, November 2024
87	Vatican City	Vatican City	November 27, 2024	Met with Pope Francis, Cardinal Pietro Parolin and Archbishop Paul Gallagher.	
88	Belgium	Brussels	December 3–4, 2024	Attended the NATO Foreign Ministers' meeting. Met with NATO Secretary General Mark Rutte and Ukrainian Foreign Minister Andrii Sybiha.	Secretary Blinken with NATO Foreign Ministers in Brussels, December 2024
88	Malta	Valletta, Attard	December 4–5, 2024	Attended the OSCE ministerial council. Met with Prime Minister Robert Abela and Israeli Foreign Minister Gideon Sa'ar.	Secretary Blinken with Maltese Prime Minister Robert Abela in Valletta, December 2024
89	Jordan	Aqaba	December 12, 2024	Met with King Abdullah II and Foreign Minister Ayman Safadi.	Secretary Blinken with King Abdullah II in Amman, December 2024
89	Turkey	Ankara	December 12–13, 2024	Met with President Recep Tayyip Erdoğan and Foreign Minister Hakan Fidan.	Secretary Blinken with Turkish President Recep Tayyip Erdoğan and Foreign Minister Hakan Fidan in Ankara, December 2024
89	Iraq	Baghdad	December 13, 2024	Met with Prime Minister Mohammed Shia' Al Sudani.	Secretary Blinken with Iraqi Prime Minister Mohammed Shia' Al Sudani in Baghdad, December 2024
89	Jordan	Aqaba	December 14, 2024	Met with UN Special Envoy for Syria Geir Otto Pedersen and foreign ministers of the Arab contact group on Syria.	Secretary Blinken with Arab Foreign Ministers in Amman, December 2024
90	South Korea	Seoul	January 6, 2025	Met with Acting President Choi Sang-mok, Foreign Minister Cho Tae-yul and National Assembly Speaker Woo Won-shik.	Secretary Blinken with South Korean Acting President Choi Sang-mok in Seoul, January 2025
90	Japan	Tokyo	January 7, 2025	Met with Prime Minister Shigeru Ishiba, Foreign Minister Takeshi Iwaya, Chief Cabinet Secretary Yoshimasa Hayashi and National Security Advisor Takeo Akiba.	Secretary Blinken with Japanese Prime Minister Shigeru Ishiba in Tokyo, January 2025
90	France	Paris	January 8–9, 2025	Met with President Emmanuel Macron and Foreign Minister Jean-Noël Barrot.	Secretary Blinken with French Foreign Minister Jean-Noël Barrot in Paris, January 2025
90	Italy	Rome	January 9–10, 2025	Met with Quint foreign ministers.	Secretary Blinken with Quint and EU representatives in Rome, January 2025

== See also ==
- Foreign policy of the Biden administration
- List of international presidential trips made by Joe Biden
