= Strategic and Commercial Dialogue =

Diplomatic summit between India and the United States

- Official languages: Hindi; English
- Membership: India; United States

The Strategic and Commercial Dialogue was a diplomatic summit that had been held from 2010 to 2016 between India and the United States to discuss and work on common issues of concern to improve and strengthen India–United States relations.

The summit initially started as the U.S.–India Strategic Dialogue which was held from 2010 to 2014. The dialogue was announced on July 20, 2009, by Secretary of State Hillary Clinton during her visit to India. In 2015, President Barack Obama and Prime Minister Narendra Modi agreed to elevate the U.S.-India Strategic Dialogue to the Strategic and Commercial Dialogue "reflecting the United States and India's shared priorities of generating economic growth, creating jobs, improving the investment climate, and strengthening the middle class in both countries."

The Strategic and Commercial Dialogue was replaced in 2018 with the 2+2 Ministerial Dialogue.

== History ==
=== U.S.–India Strategic Dialogue ===
==== 2010 ====
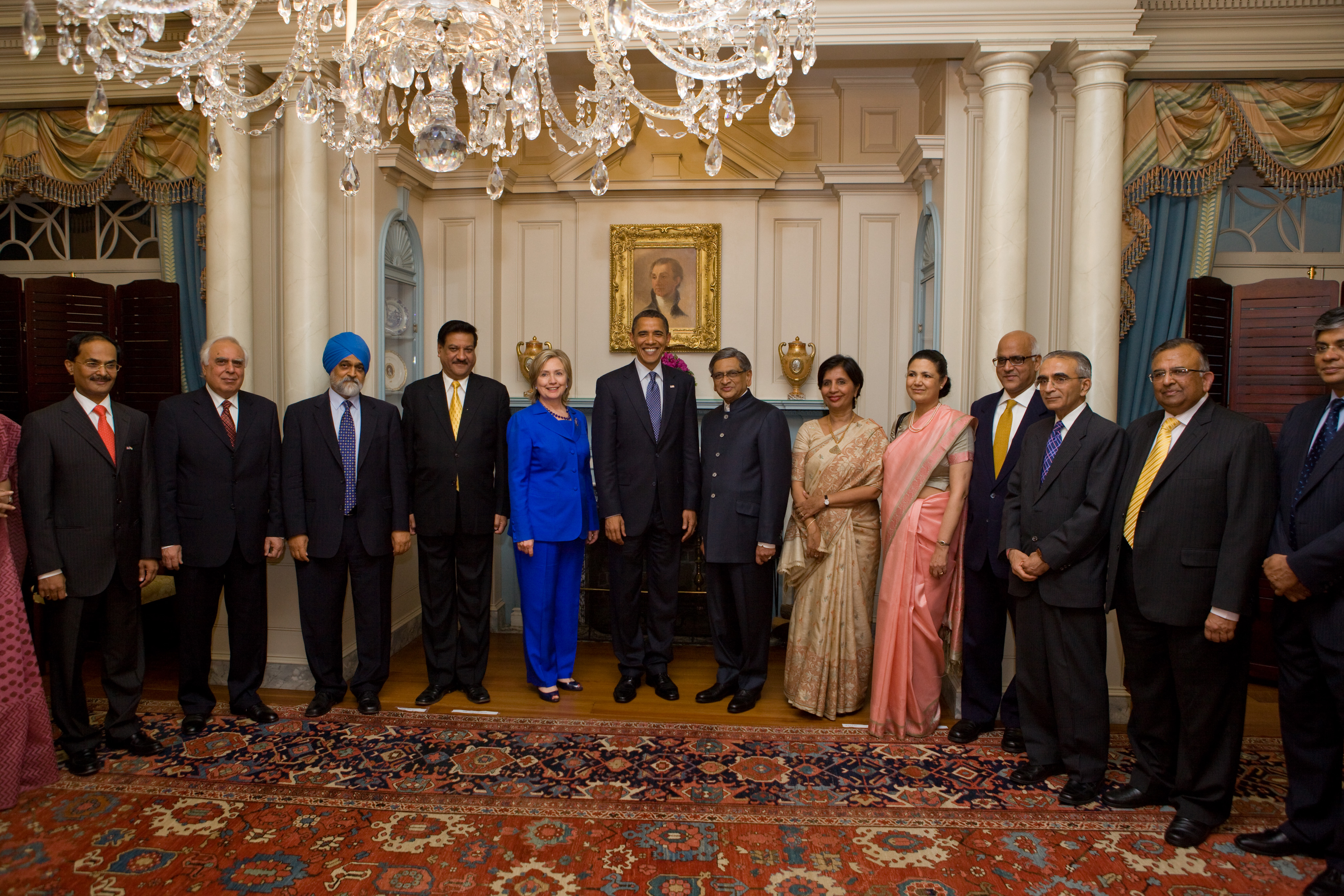
President Barack Obama, Secretary of State Hillary Clinton, and the Indian delegation at the U.S.-India Strategic Dialogue reception at the Department of State in Washington, D.C., June 3, 2010.

The first Strategic and Commercial Dialogue took place from June 1–4 in Washington, D.C.. The summit was co-chaired by Secretary of State Hillary Clinton and Minister of External Affairs S. M. Krishna. On June 3, Barack Obama addressed the summit. A joint statement was released where both sides agreed to further cooperate on a host of issues.

==== 2011 ====
The second summit was held on July 19 in New Delhi with Clinton leading the U.S. delegation. Clinton met with Minister Krishna and discussed regional issues such as terrorism, mutual suspicion of Pakistan and China, Afghanistan, Human rights, and job growth. In regard to terrorism, just six days before the summit, a terrorist attack took place in Mumbai.

The summit was supposed to take place in April but was postponed due to legislative Assembly state elections and impact of the Arab Spring protests.

==== 2012 ====
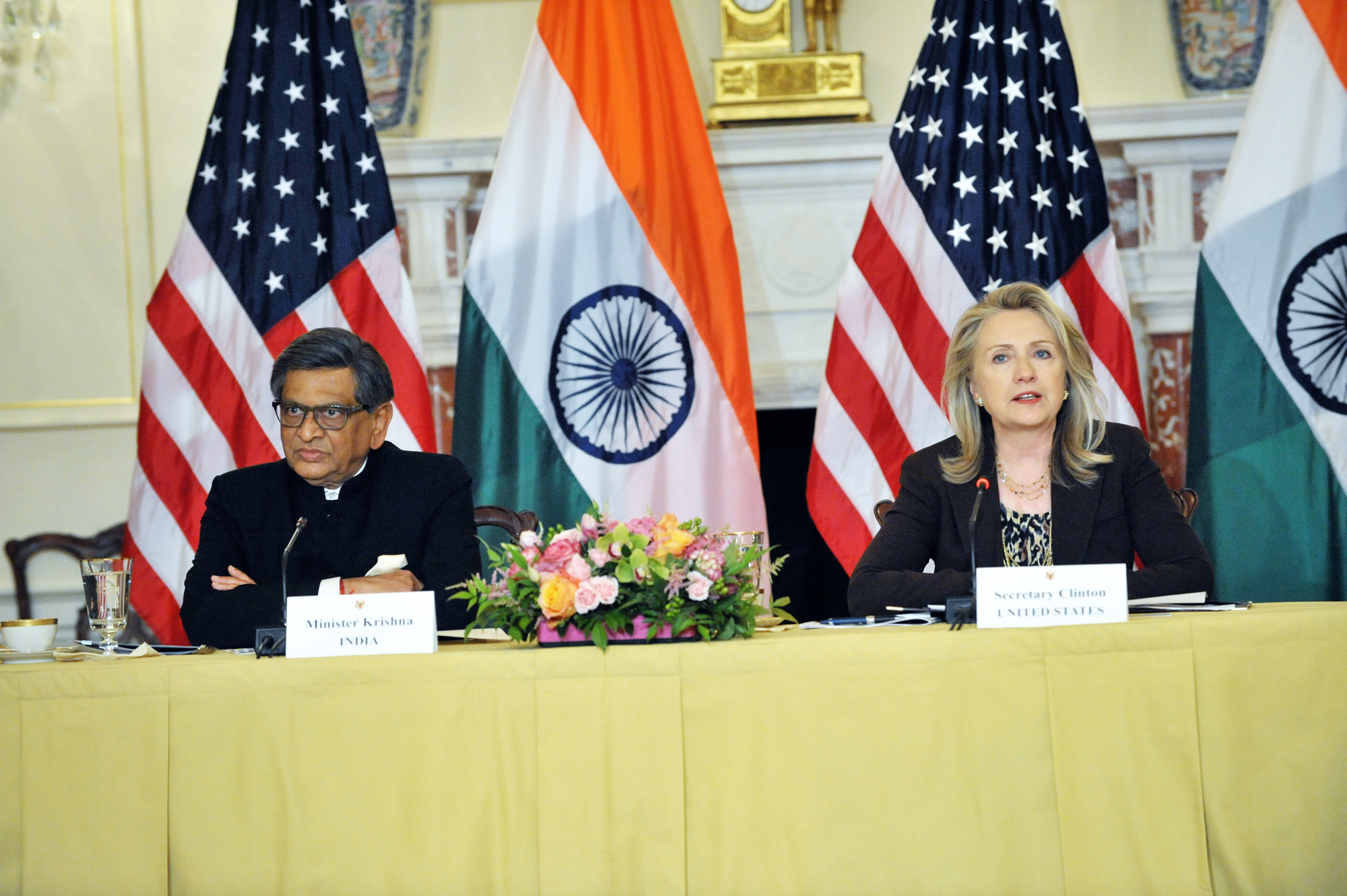
Hillary Clinton and S. M. Krishna during the third India–United States Strategic Dialogue on June 13, 2012.

The third summit was held in D.C. on June 13. Both sides agreed to launch a formal trilateral consultation between the U.S., India, and Afghanistan to coordinate regional stability. India announced its intent to ratify the Vienna Convention on Civil Liability for Nuclear Damage. In terms of trade, India's interest in importing liquefied natural gas from the U.S. was discussed. Trade was reported to be nearing a $100 billion annual target. India announced its plans to open a Cultural Center in Washington, D.C., and the opening of its new consulate in Atlanta.

The Indian government also announced establishment of the Indian Ministry of Culture Vivekananda Chair at the University of Chicago and an agreement between the Ministry of Culture and the Art Institute of Chicago for the Vivekananda Memorial Program for Museum Excellence for upgrading the skills of Museum Professionals of India as part of commemoration of the 150th birth anniversary of Swami Vivekananda.

==== 2013 ====
John Kerry took over for Clinton as Secretary of State in early 2013 and began chairing his first of two U.S.-India Strategic Dialogue summits. The summit took place on June 24 in New Delhi. The Indian delegation was chaired by Minister Salman Khurshid. Both parties continued to cooperate on regional issues such as Afghanistan, trade, counterterrorism, cybersecurity, poverty, and economic issues.

==== 2014 ====
The summit took place in New Delhi for the second straight year and the only time the summit was held in the same nation twice in a row on July 31. A change of government took place in India as Manmohan Singh was succeeded by Narendra Modi following his victory in the 2014 Indian general election. It was the first meeting of U.S. officials with the new Indian government before Modi's visit to the U.S. and meeting with President Obama in September. Kerry co-chaired the summit with Minister Sushma Swaraj. Among them were Secretary of Commerce Penny Pritzker and Minister of State for Commerce and Industry Nirmala Sitharaman. Despite the new Indian government, both sides agreed to continue the progress made since the start of the summit format in 2010, such as the Summit-level Joint Declaration on Defense Cooperation issued in September 2013, as well as on trade and regional issues.

=== Strategic and Commercial Dialogue ===
==== 2015 ====
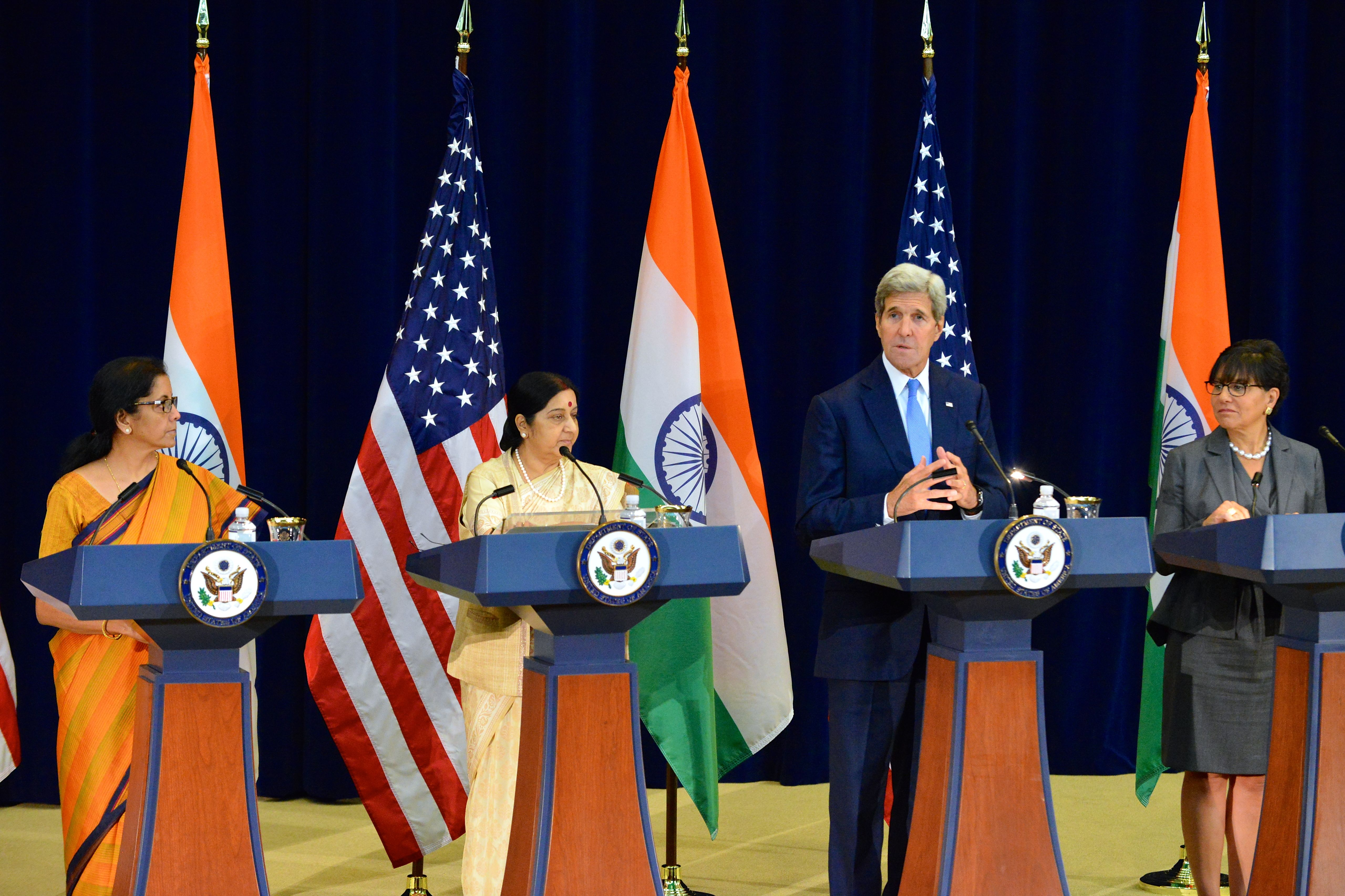
John Kerry and Sushma Swaraj at a press conference during the inaugural U.S.-India Strategic and Commercial Dialogue on September 22, 2015.

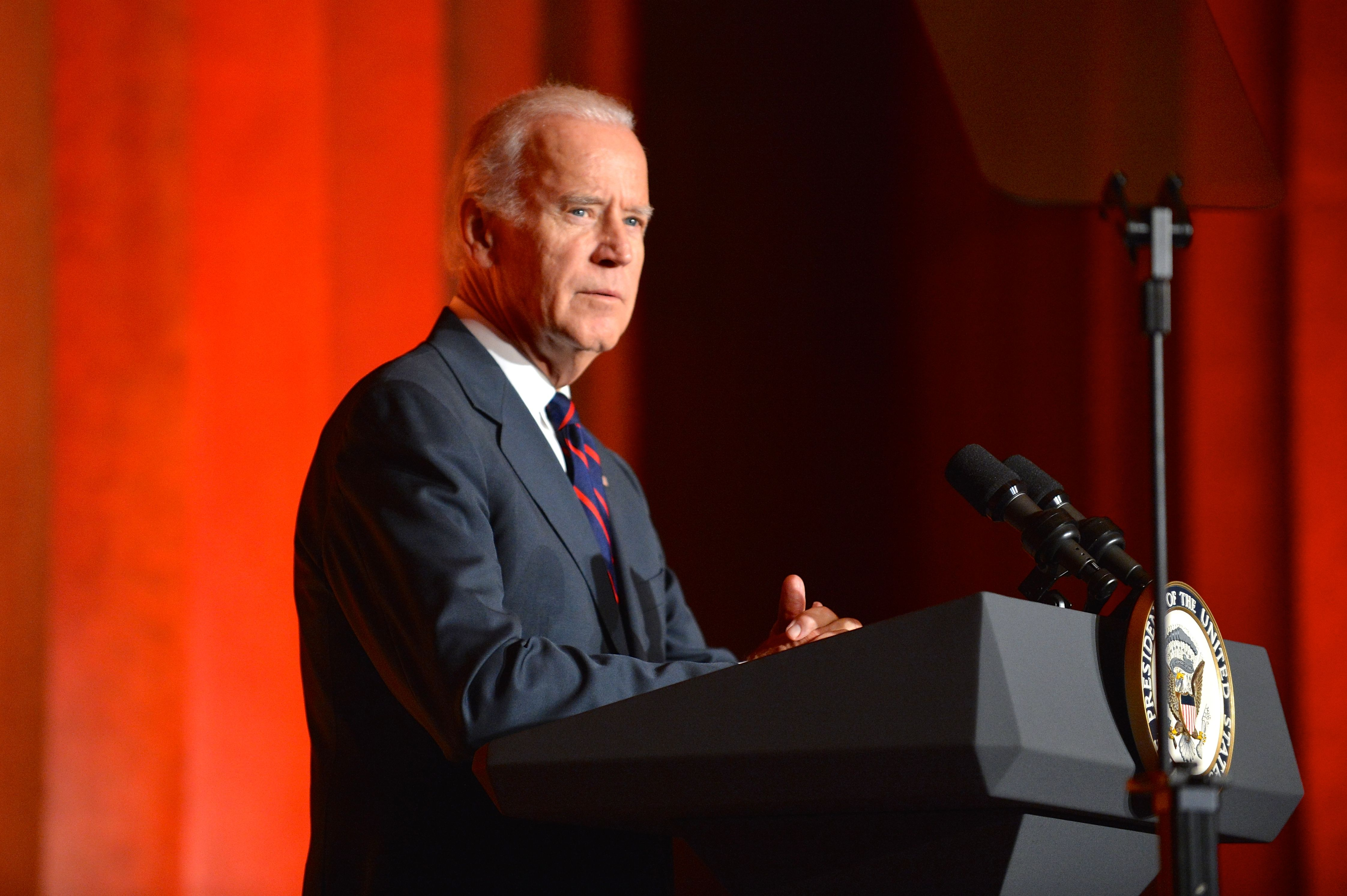
Vice President Joe Biden addressing the 2015 summit reception on September 21, 2015.

In 2015, the summit was upgraded to the Strategic and Commercial Dialogue back in January after a joint declaration by Obama and Modi.

The first Strategic and Commercial Dialogue was held from September 21–22 at the State Department. The new format prioritized more dialogue on many issue of mutual concern for both India and the United States. According to the joint statement, United States Deputy Secretary of State Antony Blinken leading a new "High Level Consultation" with India's Foreign Secretary, S. Jaishankar. Discussions about a "Policy Planning Dialogue", "Oceans Dialogue," and a "Track 1.5" on Internet and cyber issues involving participants from government and non-government. Both sides also announced a new "joint work stream" on the ease of doing business. There were plans for a formal memorandum of understanding on Energy Security, Clean Energy, and Climate Change." Part of it included the U.S. supporting India’s Project Tiger anti-poaching program and a private sector-led initiative to help ease trade between both countries. The countries also agreed to continue counterterrorism efforts, furthering advancements in health, technology, and fighting climate change.

Vice President Joe Biden addressed the summit reception on September 21 stating "Our goal is to become India's best friend."

The joint statement nor the fact sheet on economic cooperation mentioned India's interest in Asia-Pacific Economic Cooperation membership, commercial civil nuclear cooperation, and announcement of defense sales as that was left out to be announced jointly by both countries leaders.

==== 2016 ====
The second and last Strategic and Commercial Dialogue was held in New Delhi on August 30. Secretary Kerry, U.S. Secretary of Commerce Penny Pritzker co-chaired summit with Minister of External Affairs Sushma Swaraj and Minister of State for Commerce and Industry Nirmala Sitharaman. Despite the warm relationship and open dialogue between both sides, no progress on trade was made due to in large part no free trade agreement between India and the United States due to India's protectionist trade policy and most exports to India from America outnumbers Indian exports in general. Another part is India's agriculture sector isn’t globally competitive and any liberal trade agreement for agricultural markets would come at a loss to India. India and the U.S. also lack a bilateral investment treaty despite talks since 2009 and commitments by both countries leadership.

Per the joint statement, both sides agreed to remain in touch and continue to further strengthen the bilateral partnership on the same issues of mutual concern and decided to convene the next round in the United States in 2017. However, no such summit took place in 2017 until it was replaced by the 2+2 Ministerial Dialogue in 2018.

== See also ==
- Foreign relations of India
- Foreign relations of the United States
- India–United States relations
- 2+2 Ministerial Dialogue
- C5+1
- Quadrilateral Security Dialogue
