= 2+2 Ministerial Dialogue =

Diplomatic summit

- Official languages: Hindi; English; Japanese; Russian
- Membership: India; United States; Japan; Australia; Russia; United Kingdom; Brazil

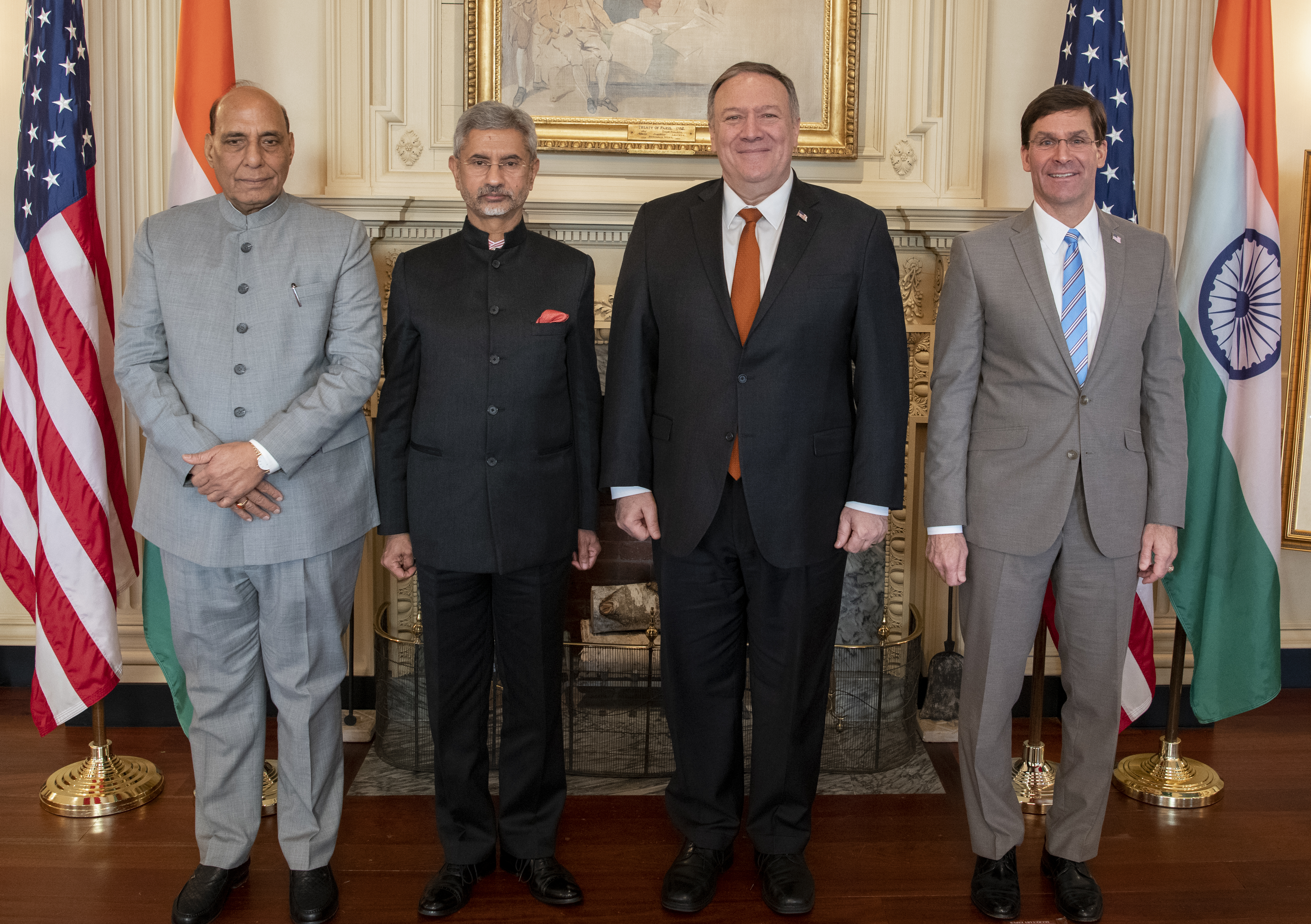
From left to right: Rajnath Singh, Subrahmanyam Jaishankar, Mike Pompeo, and Mark Esper during the second 2+2 summit on December 18, 2019

The 2+2 Ministerial Dialogue is a diplomatic summit that has been held every year since 2018 initially between the Minister of External Affairs or Foreign Minister, and Defence Minister of India with the Secretary of State and Secretary of Defense of the United States to discuss and work on common issues of concern to improve and strengthen India–United States relations.

In 2019, the summit involved the respective Foreign and Defence ministers between both India and Japan. In 2021, the summit was expanded to meetings with the Foreign and Defence ministers of Australia and Russia.

== History ==
The dialogue came to existence from an agreement between Prime Minister Narendra Modi and President Donald Trump. The dialogue was created to replace the Strategic and Commercial Dialogue which started under the Obama administration. Both nations agreed to the summit during Modi's visit to the United States in June 2017 which was officially announced the following month in August after a phone call between Modi and Trump.

The first summit was supposed to be held on July 6, 2018, in Washington, D.C., but had been postponed by India's Defence Minister, Nirmala Sitharaman, citing "unavoidable reasons". This was the third time the dialogue was postponed.

=== 2018 ===
The first summit was held on September 6 between the Minister of External Affairs, Sushma Swaraj, Defence Minister, Nirmala Sitharaman, Secretary of State Mike Pompeo, and Secretary of Defense Jim Mattis in New Delhi. The meeting between both sides reaffirmed the U.S.'s designation of India as a "Major Defense Partner". India was granted license-free exports, re-exports, and transfers under the License Exception Strategic Trade Authorization. India and the U.S. signed a Communications Compatibility and Security Agreement which facilitates interoperability between militaries and sale of high-end technology. The summit resulted in both sides beginning negotiations for the Industrial Security Annex which would allow U.S. defense firms to sell military equipment to Indian partners.

Among other things that were agreed upon was continuing to deepen cooperation in counterterrorism, facilitate peace in Afghanistan, increase further economic cooperation, and the establishment of six nuclear power plans in India between Nuclear Power Corporation of India and Westinghouse Electric Company. Representatives from both countries agreed to turn the meeting into an annual affair.

=== 2019 ===
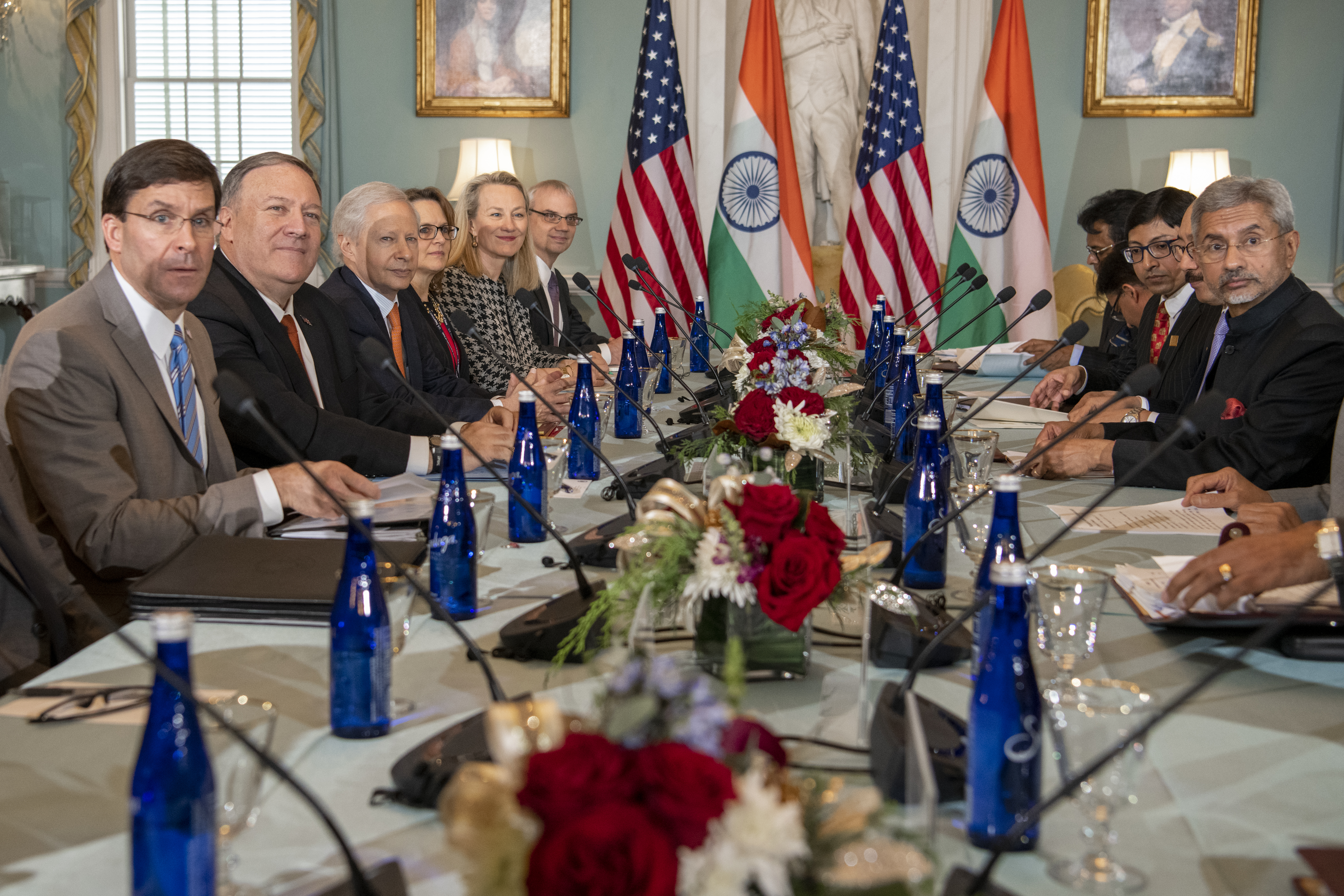
Mike Pompeo and Mark Esper meeting with Subrahmanyam Jaishankar on December 18, 2019, for the second 2+2 summit

The second summit was held on December 18 in Washington, D.C., between Mike Pompeo, Secretary of Defense Mark Esper, Minister of External Affairs, S. Jaishankar, and Minister of Defense Rajnath Singh. The meeting revolved most of the areas of concern from the previous year. The ministers and secretaries welcomed the Quadrilateral Security Dialogue that was held between India, the United States, Australia, and Japan in September.

The meeting resulted in both countries signing the Industrial Security Annex which allowed one-hundred and fourteen fighter jets to be sold to India. Both sides were still negotiating the final details of signing the Basic Exchange and Cooperation Agreement for Geo-spatial Cooperation agreement.

=== 2020 ===
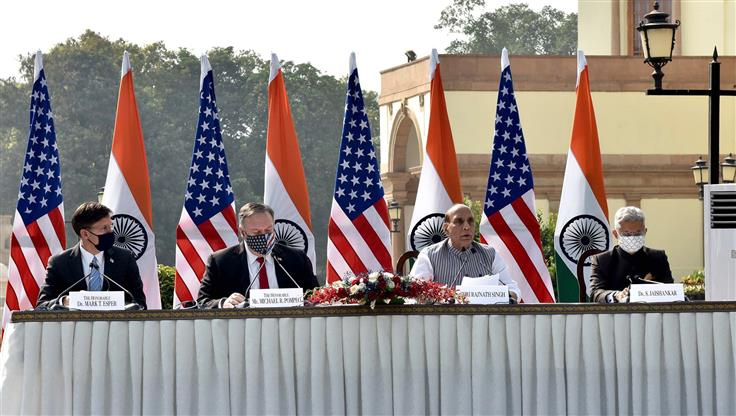
From left to right: Mark Esper, Mike Pompeo, Rajnath Singh, and Subrahmanyam Jaishankar during the third 2+2 summit on October 27, 2020

The third summit was held on October 27 in New Delhi where both sides announced the signing of the Basic Exchange and Cooperation Agreement for Geo-spatial Cooperation and with the United States vowing to support India's "territorial sovereignty and liberty" which was a response to the May skirmishes between India and China's armed forces at the disputed region of their border known as the Line of Actual Control. Secretary Pompeo described the Chinese Communist Party as "no friend to democracy". Both sides also discussed combating the COVID-19 pandemic.

=== 2021 ===
In November, it was announced that the fourth meeting between India and the U.S. would be held in November and have the possibility of both Narendra Modi and President Joe Biden meeting in Washington, but no date was set for the summit. In October, officials from both countries had discussed regional issues during the sixteenth US-India Defence Policy Group meeting that was said to lay the groundwork for the next 2+2 dialogue.

On December 16, the Minister of External Affairs spokesperson, Arindam Bagchi, announced that a 2+2 was unlikely to be held in 2021 as details including a date had yet to be finalized. However, no 2+2 summit was held in 2021.

=== 2022 ===
In March, it was announced that India and the U.S. would hold the 2+2 meeting in Washington, D.C., on April 11 between External Affairs Minister S Jaishankar, Defence Minister Rajnath Singh, Secretary of State Antony Blinken, and Secretary of Defense Lloyd Austin. Singh was expected to be in the U.S. from April 10 to 13. The summit was held in Washington on April 11, with both sides looking forward to India hosting the next summit.

After the summit, Antony Blinken remarked during the press conference that the U.S. was monitoring the rise in abuses of human rights in India. Three days later on the thirteenth, Jaishankar rebuked that India had concerns about human rights in the U.S. citing hate crimes against members of the Indian community in New York. But mainly attributed the attacks on human rights in India under the premiership of Narendra Modi to "lobbies and the vote banks which drive that."

=== India and Japan ===
On November 30, 2019, India and Japan held their first 2+2 meeting in New Delhi between Japanese Foreign Affairs Minister Toshimitsu Motegi, Defense Minister Taro Kono, Minister of External Affairs, S. Jaishankar, and Minister of Defense Rajnath Singh.

The meeting was seen as a deepening of relations between India and Japan in light of their mutual tension with China and concern with China's assertiveness in expanding not only its influence but also control in regional issues.

In April 2022, it was announced that India and Japan would hold their second 2+2 meeting in Tokyo in mid-April with Singh and S. Jaishankar meeting with their counterparts Defence Minister Nobuo Kishi and Foreign Minister Yoshimasa Hayashi. However, no meeting was held in Tokyo as instead the meeting was changed to take place in September. The meeting took place on September 8 in Tokyo with S. Jaishankar and Rajnath Singh meeting with Prime Minister Fumio Kishida.

=== India and Australia ===
From September 10 to 12, 2021, India and Australia, held their first 2+2 summit.

India was represented by the Minister of External Affairs, S. Jaishankar, and Minister of Defense Rajnath Singh. Australia was represented by Minister of Foreign Affairs Marise Payne and Defense Minister Peter Dutton. The summit was held in New Delhi, with both countries sharing mutual interests with the United States and Japan over China's ambitions. Both sides held the forum after Narendra Modi and Australian Prime Minister Scott Morrison agreed to upgrade the relations to Comprehensive Strategic Partnership after a virtual summit in June 2020.

Both sides agreed to further expand cooperation by holding the summit once every two years.

=== India and Russia ===
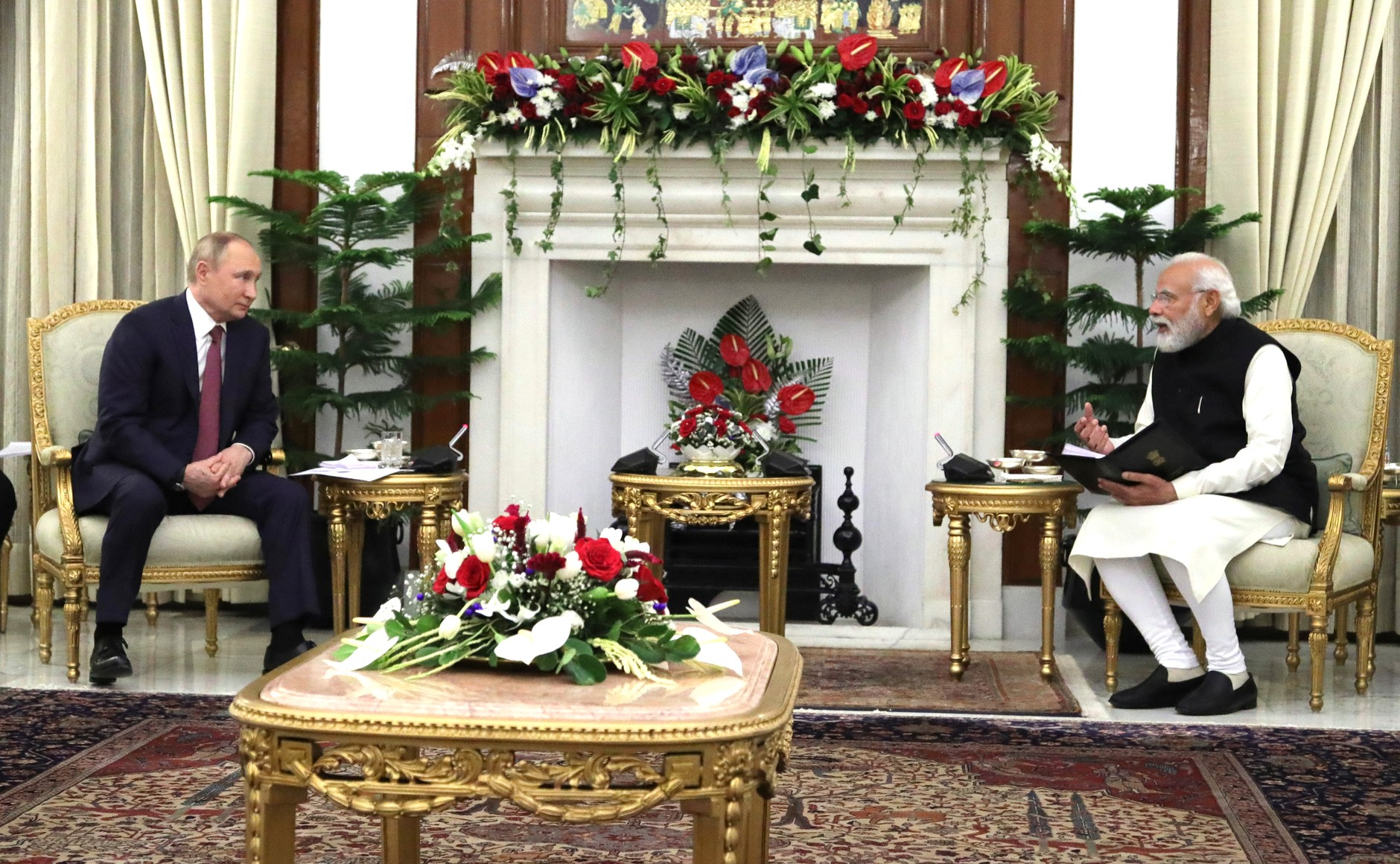
Vladimir Putin with Narendra Modi for the 21st India-Russia Annual Summit in New Delhi on December 6, 2021

On November 26, 2021, it was announced India and Russia would hold a 2+2 summit on December 6 with Russian Minister of Foreign Affairs Sergey Lavrov and Defence Minister Sergei Shoigu with their respective Indian counterparts S. Jaishankar and Rajnath Singh. The meeting included the possibility of Russian President Vladimir Putin visiting India meeting with Narendra Modi during the summit. The agreement for such a summit was made in agreement during a phone call on April 28 between Putin and Modi. Lavrov described the summit by stating, "I'm confident that the new mechanism is going to turn into an efficient dialogue platform to talk about a wide range of regional and international topics a little further deepening our traditional, mutual understanding. It'll help reinforce our specially privileged strategic partnership between our countries".

Putin arrived in India for the 21st India-Russia Annual Summit in New Delhi on December 6, which was being held along with the 2+2 summit. An agreement was reached by both sides with India producing more than six hundred thousand Kalashnikov rifles and a military and technical cooperation pact was agreed upon lasting until 2031 which included a pledge to boost annual trade to thirty billion dollars by 2025.

=== India and United Kingdom ===
The inaugural India-UK 2+2 Foreign and Defence Dialogue was held in New Delhi on 16 October 2023. The Indian delegation was co-chaired by Piyush Srivastava, Joint Secretary Europe West, and Vishwesh Negi, Joint Secretary, International Cooperation. The UK delegation was co-chaired by Ben Mellor, India Director, Indian Ocean Directorate and Robert Magowan, Deputy Chief of Defence Staff, Finance and Military Capability.

== See also ==
- Foreign relations of India
- Foreign relations of Australia
- Foreign relations of Japan
- Foreign relations of Russia
- Foreign relations of the United Kingdom
- Foreign relations of the United States
- India–United States relations
- India–Japan relations
- India–Russia relations
- India–United Kingdom relations
- Australia–India relations
- C5+1
- Quadrilateral Security Dialogue
