= C5+1 =

Diplomatic summit between

- Official languages: English; Kazakh; Kyrgyz; Tajik; Turkmen; Uzbek
- Demonyms: Americans; Kazakhs; Kyrgyz; Tajiks; Turkmens; Uzbeks
- Membership: United States; Kazakhstan; Kyrgyzstan; Tajikistan; Turkmenistan; Uzbekistan

The C5+1 is a diplomatic summit that has been held every year since 2015 between the foreign ministers of the five Central Asian countries of Kazakhstan, Kyrgyzstan, Tajikistan, Turkmenistan, and Uzbekistan, with the United States Secretary of State to discuss and work on common issues of concern to improve and strengthen the U.S. relationship with the five Central Asian states, but to also enhance the relations between the individual nations in Central Asia. The format is used to discuss regional issues such as the war in Afghanistan, the Syrian civil war, the war on terror, combating drug and human trafficking, economic issues regarding trade relations, job growth in the region, and combating environmental issues.

The C5+1 is viewed as an attempt by the United States to gain influence in the Central Asian states countering Russia where U.S.–Russian relations have worsened since 2014, and what the U.S. has perceived as being Russia's ambitions to restore the Soviet Union.

== History ==
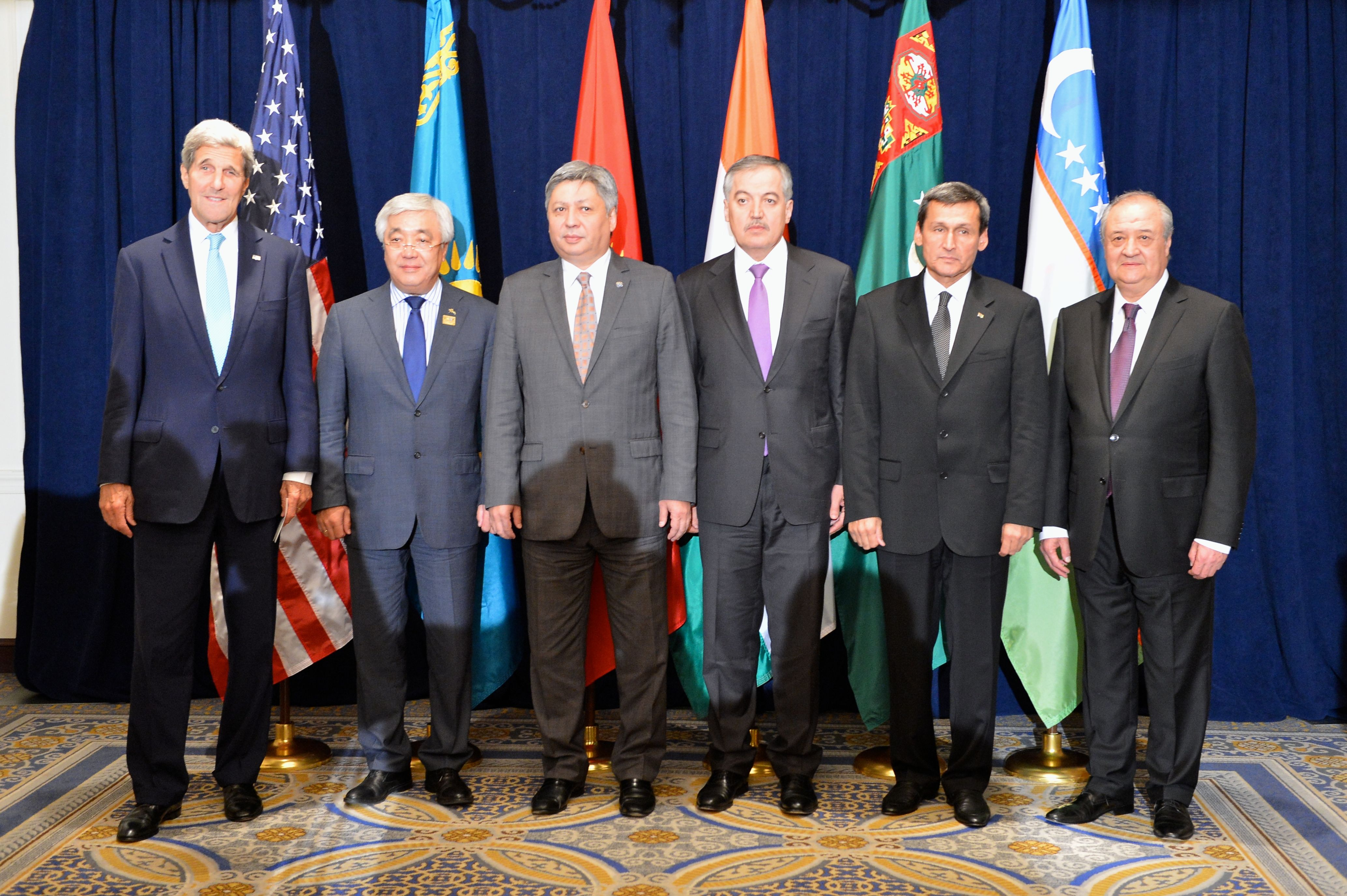
John Kerry (far left) with the Central Asian foreign ministers during the 70th Regular Session of the UN General Assembly in New York on September 26, 2015.

The first meeting between the six states took place on September 26, 2015, during the seventieth session of the United Nations General Assembly where then-U.S. Secretary of State John Kerry met with his foreign minister counterparts from the five states to establish a new multilateral dialogue platform. Following the meeting at the U.N., from October to November, Kerry embarked on visiting each of the five countries marking the first time a Secretary of State visited these countries since James Baker in 1992 following their independence from the Soviet Union.

=== 2015 ===
The C5+1's first summit took place on November 1 in Samarkand, Uzbekistan. The summit resulted in the six countries issuing a declaration on increasing cooperation in trade, transport, and energy. The parties also issued a Joint Declaration of Partnership and Cooperation where the countries will improve cooperation in regional trade, transport and communication, energy linkages, and transit opportunities, including upgrading existing facilities and promoting common rules and regulations. Kerry announced at the summit that the U.S. would launch a program called Smart Waters, which would focus on training future expert water managers and river basin planning for sustainable water management in the region.

=== 2016 ===
U.S. Secretary of State John Kerry with the "C5+1" Foreign Ministers - from Kazakhstan, Uzbekistan, Tajikistan, and Kyrgyzstanat the Fairmont Vier Jahreszeiten Hamburg Hotel in Hamburg, Germany on December 7 one day before the 23rd Organization for Security and Co-operation in Europe Ministerial Council summit.

The second summit was held in Washington, D.C., on August 3. The meeting itself marked the twenty-fifth anniversary of the establishment of diplomatic relations between each of the six states.

The summit resulted in the U.S. and the five Central Asian states launching five corresponding projects with the U.S. providing financial support up to fifteen million dollars. The projects include the Global Counterterrorism Forum (GCTF) Regional Dialogue, which aims to counter foreign terrorist fighters and radicalization to violence in the region. The dialogue will work to implement The Hague–Marrakech Memorandum on Good Practices for a More Effective Response to the Foreign Terrorist Fighter Phenomenon. The Central Asia Business Competitiveness (CABC) aims to make it easier for businesses in Central Asia to increase exports and enter new markets working with governments and trade authorities making it easier for businesses to export goods and to attract capital and technology to improve food production, processing, and packaging. The Transport Corridor Development (TCD) is to reduce the cost and time associated with moving goods across the borders in Central Asia and improve the quality of transport and logistics services across the region. Power the Future is to provide renewable energy across the region with the U.S. providing training and technical assistance on strategic energy planning, competitive procurement, grid integration, smart incentives, renewable energy zones, and innovative finance. Supporting National and Regional Adaptation Planning is to increase the region's capacity to adapt against the impact of climate change by helping the five nations adaptation process under the United Nations Framework Convention on Climate Change.

=== 2017 ===
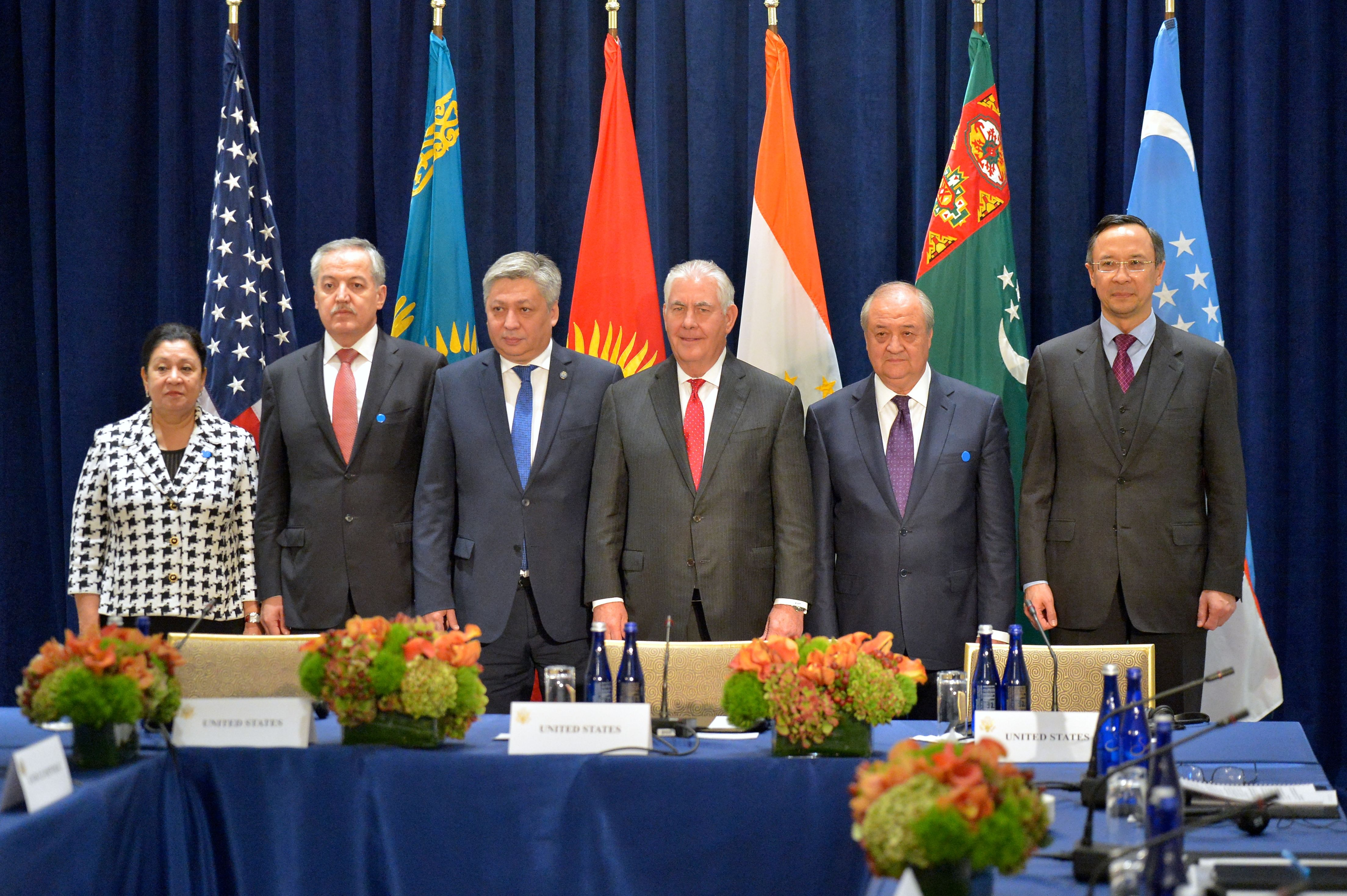
U.S. Secretary of State Rex Tillerson participates in the C5+1 Multilateral Meeting with the representatives from Kazakhstan, Tajikistan, Turkmenistan, Kyrgyzstan, and Uzbekistan during Seventy-second session of the United Nations General Assembly on September 22.

Two summits were held in 2017. The first was held in Dushanbe, Tajikistan, on July 26. This summit marked the first meeting without the Secretary of State and the foreign ministers of the five Central Asian nations. The meeting was held at the National Library with the United States being represented by R. Carl Paschall, the Deputy Coordinator for Operations Policy and Military Coordination of the State Department's Bureau of Counterterrorism and Countering Violent Extremism, with the then-U.S. Ambassador to Tajikistan, Elisabeth I. Millard. The meeting focused primarily on security concerns involving regional cooperation in counterterrorism and addressing the threat of foreign fighters in the region.

The second meeting was held on September 22 in New York with the ministers meeting with Rex Tillerson during the Seventy-second session of the United Nations General Assembly.

=== 2018 ===
Deputy Assistant Secretary Henry S. Ensher Attends C5+1 Security Working Group Meeting in Tashkent on July 23.

The fifth summit was held in Tashkent, Uzbekistan, on July 23. This was the second time the U.S. Secretary of State did not attend the summit, but the Uzbek Foreign Minister, Abdulaziz Kamilov opened the meeting. The U.S. was represented by Acting Deputy Assistant Secretary of State for Central Asia, Henry Ensher with the then-U.S. Ambassador to Uzbekistan Pamela Spratlen. The six nations reaffirmed their commitment to addressing the issues and cooperation as agreed upon back during the 2016 summit. The meeting also launched two security working groups with the United States Institute of Peace focusing on community engagement in preventing radicalization.

=== 2019 ===
Two summits of the C5+1 were held in 2019. The first was on August 21 in Nur-Sultan, Kazakhstan, on the occasion of the C5+1 High-Level Security Discussion where the nations reaffirmed their support for the C5+1 platform and initiatives. This summit was the third time that the Secretary of State did not attend. Instead, David Hale, the then-Under Secretary of State for Political Affairs represented the United States.

The second summit was held on September 22 in New York City during the Seventy-fourth session of the United Nations General Assembly. The summit marked the return of the Secretary of State with Mike Pompeo leading the U.S. delegation and meeting with his foreign minister counterparts. Aside from the usual agreement to cooperate on the issues the summit has been engaged in since 2015, Pompeo, while discussing counterterrorism referred to China's treatment of the Uighurs stating, "And further on the subject of terrorism, I want to make clear that China’s repressive campaign in Xinjiang is not about terrorism. It’s about China’s attempt – about China’s attempt to erase its own citizens’ Muslim faith and culture. We call on all countries to resist China's demands to repatriate Uighurs."

=== 2020 ===
Secretary of State Mike Pompeo delivers opening remarks virtually at the C5+1 High Level Dialogue, from the U.S. Department of State in Washington, D.C., on June 30, 2020.

Two summits were once again held in 2020. The first was on February 3 in Tashkent, Uzbekistan, where Pompeo and the foreign ministers of Central Asia discussed the Afghan peace process, joint border security, and regional efforts to improve economic and energy connectivity. Pompeo had met with each of the foreign ministers individually as well as the Presidents of both Kazakhstan, Kassym-Jomart Tokayev on February 2 in Nur-Sultan, and Uzbekistan, Shavkat Mirziyoyev on February 3. During the meeting, Pompeo warned the five countries to not become overly dependent on China criticizing their business and lending practices, and mentioning China's persecution of Uyghur and Kazakh minorities.

The second summit was held on June 30 over video conference due to the COVID-19 pandemic which was attended by the U.S. by Secretary of State Mike Pompeo. The meeting primarily revolved around the economic impact of the pandemic.

=== 2021 ===
Secretary of State Antony J. Blinken participates in a virtual C5+1 Ministerial with Deputy Assistant Secretary for Bureau of South and Central Asian Affairs Jonathan Henick at the U.S. Department of State in Washington, D.C., on April 23, 2021.

Secretary of State Antony J. Blinken with the C5+1 Foreign Ministers during the Seventy-ninth session of the United Nations General Assembly on September 22, 2021.

On January 7, the governments of the United States, Kazakhstan, and Uzbekistan, announced the creation of the Central Asia Investment Partnership to be implemented through the C5+1. The U.S. International Development Finance Corporation, Astana International Financial Centre, and the Ministry of Investments and Foreign Trade of Uzbekistan, plan to raise one billion dollars over the next five years to support the advancement of private-sector-led growth and increase economic connectivity within Central Asia and the broader region to help the countries recover from the economic impact of the COVID-19 pandemic.

The first summit took place on April 23, 2021, during a virtual meeting with the foreign ministers and Secretary of State Antony Blinken. The participants welcomed the U.S. proposal for a future meeting of the group with U.S. Special Presidential Envoy for Climate John Kerry. While noting the importance of the C5+1 working groups on economic issues, environment and energy, and security, and agreed the C5+1 working groups will continue to meet regularly, including later in 2021, at the expert level to prepare decisions for future high-level dialogue meetings. The next meeting with Uzbekistan hosting in July will review the program of work adopted in 2020 and adjust it as necessary. And lastly, the ministers and the secretary agreed to meet again by the end of the year.

The next summit took place from July 15 to 16 in Tashkent, Uzbekistan, the first in-person summit since 2019. The United States was represented by Elizabeth Sherwood-Randall, where she and the foreign ministers discussed among the usual issues of concern, including the U.S. pullout from Afghanistan expected by August 31.

=== 2023 ===
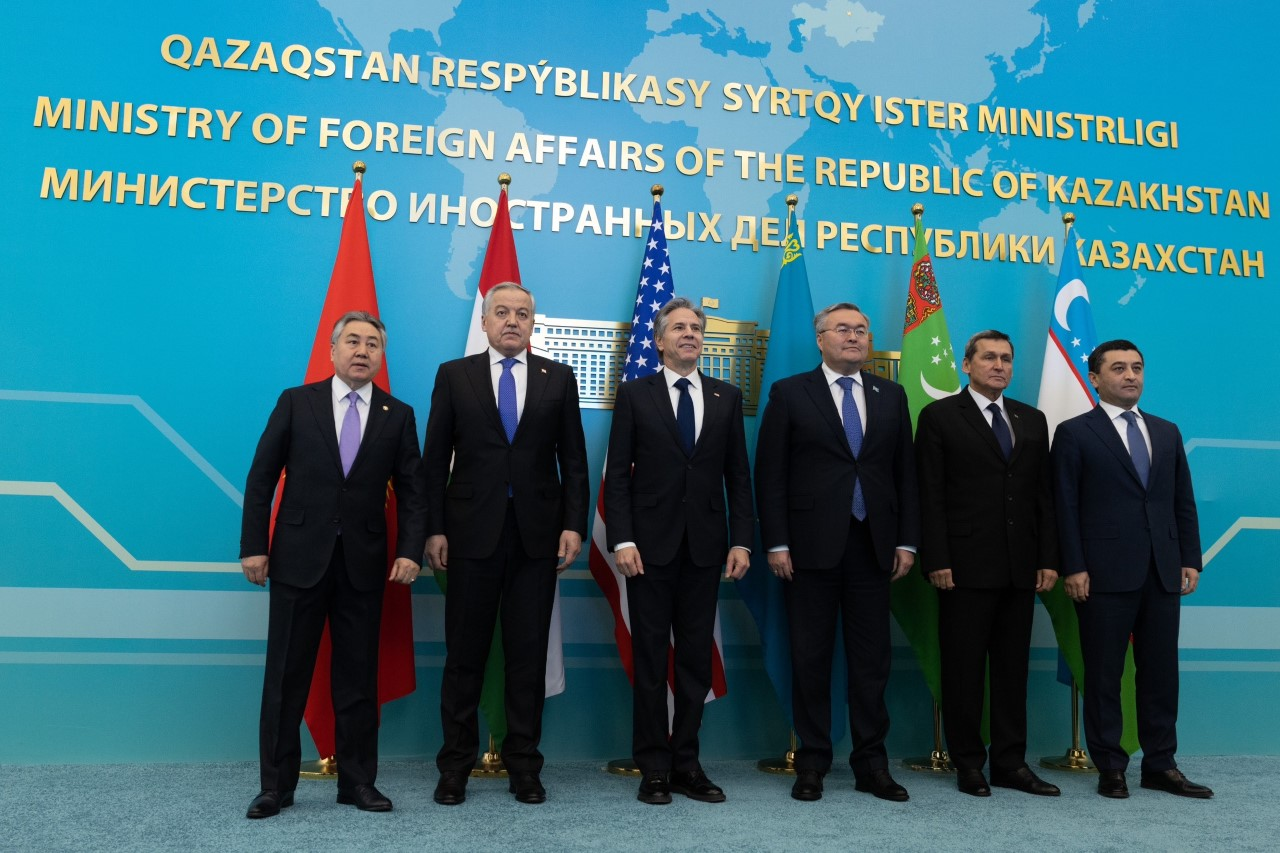
Secretary of State Antony J. Blinken poses for a photo with C5+1 Foreign Ministers during a C5 Ministerial Meeting in Astana, Kazakhstan, on February 28.

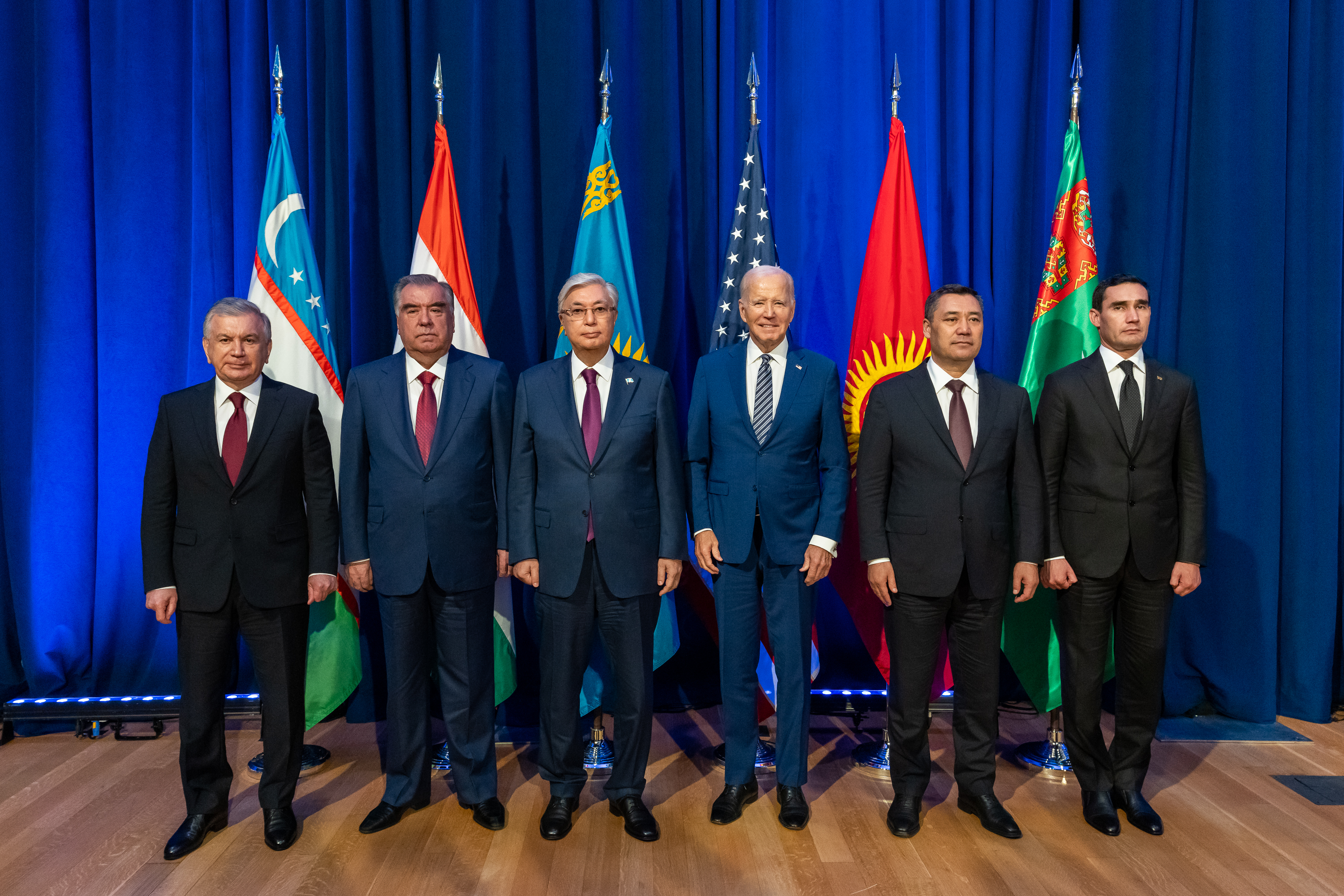
President Joe Biden poses for a photo with leaders of the C5 Central Asian countries, President of Kazakhstan Kassym-Jomart Tokayev, President of Uzbkeistan Shavkat Mirziyoyev, President of Tajikstan Emomali Rahmon, President of Turkmenistan Serdar Berdimuhamedow, and President of Kyrgyzstan Sadyr Japarov at the U.S. Mission to the United Nations, September 19

=== 2024 ===
Secretary of State Antony J. Blinken with the C5+1 Foreign Ministers during the Seventy-ninth session of the United Nations General Assembly on September 27.

=== 2025 ===
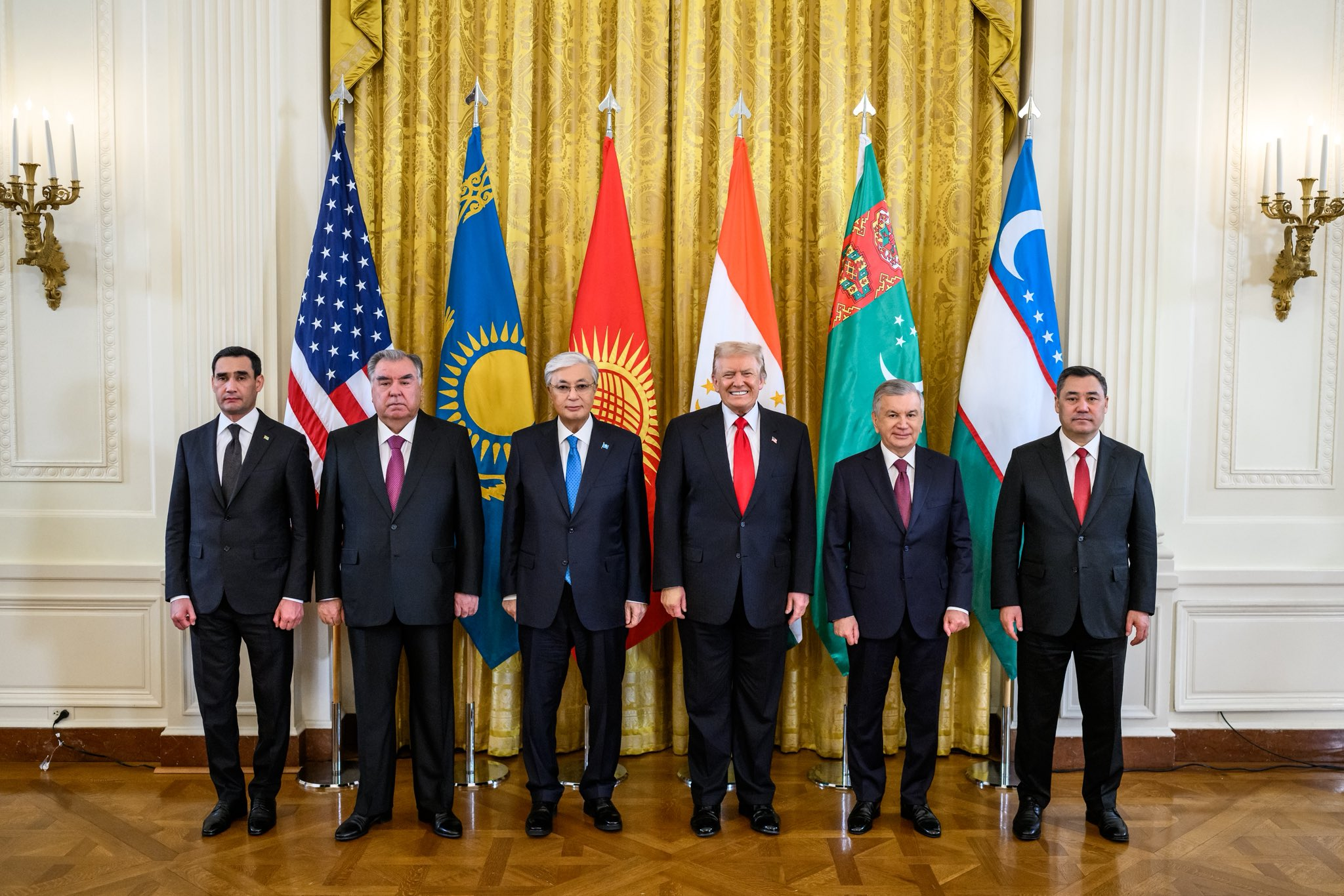
President Donald Trump poses for a photo with leaders of the C5 Central Asian countries, President of Kazakhstan Kassym-Jomart Tokayev, President of Uzbkeistan Shavkat Mirziyoyev, President of Tajikstan Emomali Rahmon, President of Turkmenistan Serdar Berdimuhamedow, and President of Kyrgyzstan Sadyr Japarov in the East Room of the White House, November 6

On November 6, U.S. President Donald Trump welcomed the leaders of five Central Asian countries, President of Kazakhstan Kassym-Jomart Tokayev, President of Uzbkeistan Shavkat Mirziyoyev, President of Tajikstan Emomali Rahmon, President of Turkmenistan Serdar Berdimuhamedow, and President of Kyrgyzstan Sadyr Japarov, to the White House, marking the first time the presidents of Central Asian nations had visited Washington, D.C. together. Trump and officials from Kazakhstan, Kyrgyzstan, Tajikistan, Turkmenistan, and Uzbekistan held bilateral meetings in the Oval Office before a working dinner. During the meeting, the two sides reached a deal on critical minerals and connectivity, the U.S. and Uzbekistan reached a trade agreement, and Kazakhstan joined the Abraham Accords.

== See also ==
- 2+2 Ministerial Dialogue
- Central Asia plus Japan
- Central Asian Union
- Foreign relations of the United States
- Foreign policy of the United States
- Foreign relations of Kazakhstan
- Foreign relations of Kyrgyzstan
- Foreign relations of Tajikistan
- Foreign relations of Turkmenistan
- Foreign relations of Uzbekistan
- Kazakhstan–United States relations
- Kyrgyzstan–United States relations
- Tajikistan–United States relations
- Turkmenistan–United States relations
- United States–Uzbekistan relations
