= Uzbekistan–European Union relations =

- European Union: Uzbekistan

Uzbekistan–European Union relations are the bilateral diplomatic relations between Uzbekistan and the European Union (EU).

The beginning of the relations of the Republic of Uzbekistan with the European Union was founded on April 15, 1992, with the signing of a memorandum of understanding between the government of the Republic of Uzbekistan and the Commission of the European Communities. Diplomatic relations were established between the parties on November 16, 1994.

The Partnership and Cooperation Agreement between the European Union and Uzbekistan was signed in Florence in June 1996 at the level of heads of state.

In October 2025, Uzbekistan and the European Union signed the Enhanced Partnership and Cooperation Agreement (EPCA) in Brussels. The EPCA introduces modern mechanisms for trade, investment, governance, and sectoral cooperation, reflecting Uzbekistan’s recent reforms and the EU’s growing engagement in Central Asia. It aims to create a more predictable environment for economic ties, strengthen political dialogue, and deepen collaboration in areas such as connectivity, sustainable development, and security. The agreement is viewed as a major step toward developing Uzbekistan–EU relations to a more strategic and comprehensive partnership.

== Economic relations ==
The European Union and Uzbekistan undertake to provide the most convenient state assistance in the following areas:

- Customs duties and charges on imported and exported goods;
- Direct and indirect taxation of imported goods, as well as rules for sale, purchase, transportation, distribution and use of goods in the domestic market.

The total volume of trade relations between the European Union and Uzbekistan was 545 million in 1993, and 1.1 billion in 2006. If it was US dollars, in 2010 this indicator was 1 billion. 759 mln. reached USD. According to the results of 2020, the trade turnover of the European Union with Uzbekistan is 2,228 mln. established the euro. Although Germany (874 million), Italy (340 million) and France (267 million) are Uzbekistan's main trade partners in the EU, the share of new EU member states, such as Cyprus, the Czech Republic, Lithuania, Latvia, Slovenia, Estonia, and Poland, in the exchange of goods is increasing.

== Political relations ==
Political relations between Uzbekistan and the European Union (EU) have steadily developed over the past 30 years, with significant growth in trade, investment, and cooperation.

In 2011, Uzbekistan and the EU signed a memorandum of understanding on cooperation in the energy sector, as well as the establishment of a diplomatic mission of the European Union in Tashkent on May 31, 2011, contributed to the further development of bilateral relations.

In 2024, trade between Uzbekistan and the EU reached $6.4 billion, and over 1,000 European companies now operate in the country. As chair of the Central Asian Five, Uzbekistan has prioritized regional security, economic integration, and environmental sustainability. The first-ever Central Asia-EU summit, scheduled on 3-4 April 2025, in Samarkand, marked a pivotal moment in EU-Uzbek relations. Uzbekistan aims to deepen economic ties through initiatives such as the Enhanced Partnership and Cooperation Agreement (EPCA) and support EU projects like the Global Gateway strategy. The country is also expanding its energy sector, focusing on renewable energy, and has emphasized the importance of regional security cooperation to address shared challenges.

== Cultural relations ==
Projects financed by the European Union for Uzbekistan today are supported in the fields of judicial and legal reforms, social services, in particular, maternal and child health, agricultural development, small and medium-sized businesses, environmental protection, and improvement of social services.

== Uzbekistan's foreign relations with EU member states ==
- Austria
- Belgium
- Bulgaria
- Croatia
- Cyprus
- Czech Republic
- Denmark
- Estonia
- Finland
- France
- Germany
- Greece
- Hungary
- (Republic of Ireland) Ireland
- Italy
- Latvia
- Lithuania
- Luxembourg
- Malta
- Netherlands
- Poland
- Portugal
- Romania
- Slovakia
- Slovenia
- Spain
- Sweden

== See also ==
- Foreign relations of Uzbekistan
- Foreign relations of the European Union
