= List of ambassadors of Uzbekistan to the United States =

Coordinates: 38.908327°N 77.040542°W

Ambassador of Uzbekistan to the United States Embassy of Uzbekistan, Washington, D.C.
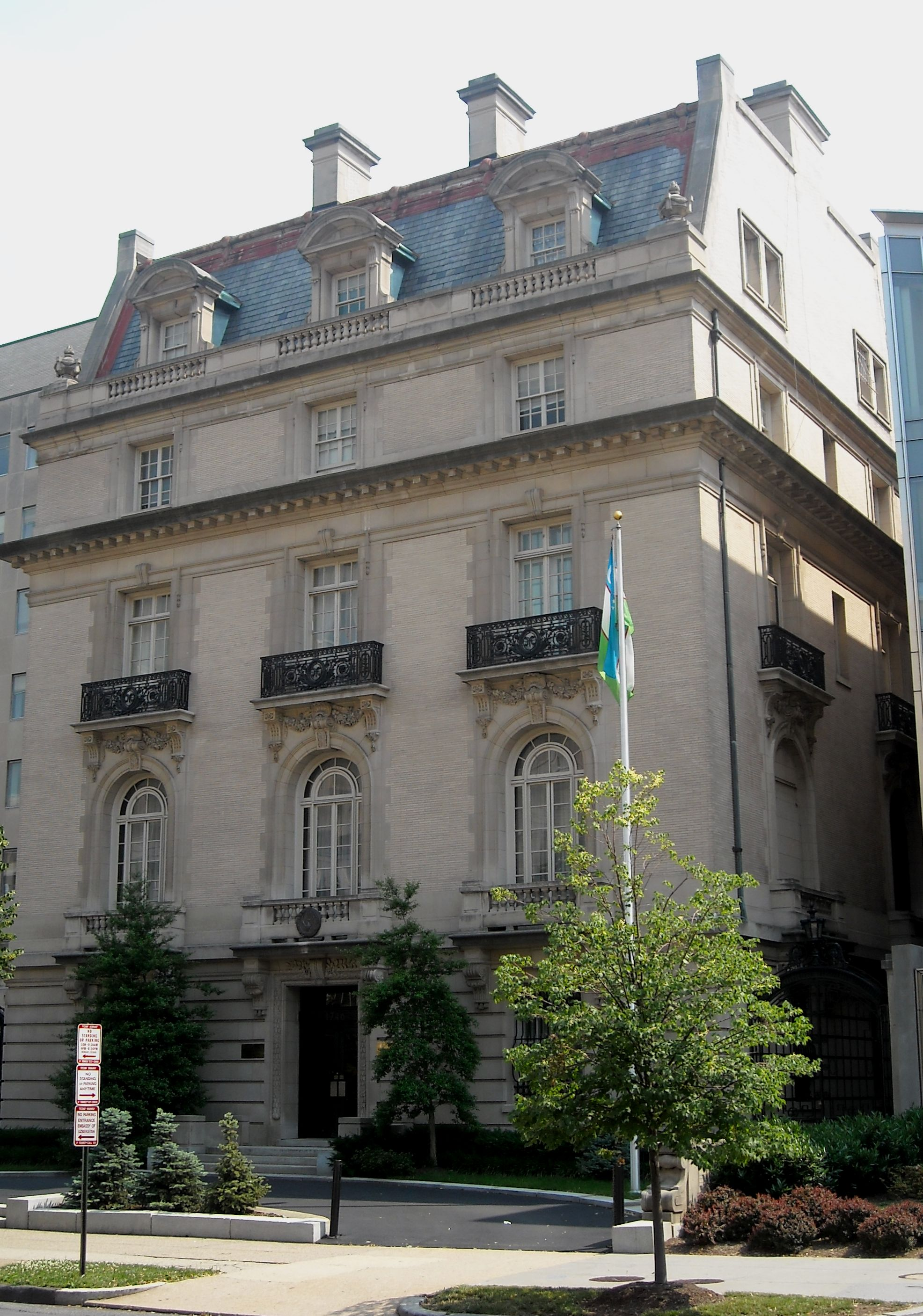
- Incumbent; Bakhtiyar Turadjanovich Gulyamov since July 18, 2013
- Inaugural holder: Mukhamed Bobir Malikov
- Formation: June 11, 1993

The Uzbek ambassador in Washington, D.C. is the official representative of the government in Tashkent to the government of the United States.

== List of representatives ==
Diplomatic agrément	Diplomatic accreditation	Ambassador	Russian language	Observations	Prime Minister of Uzbekistan	List of presidents of the United States	Term end
December 25, 1991				The governments in Tashkent and Washington, D.C. established diplomatic relations.	Shukrullo Mirsaidov	George H. W. Bush	
March 10, 1993	June 11, 1993	Muhammadbobur Malikov	Маликов, Мухаммед-Бабур Маджидович	(* September 2, 1948)	Abdulhashim Mutalov	Bill Clinton	
June 23, 1994		Fatikh Teshabaev	ru:Тешабаев, Фатих Гуламович	(*October 18, 1939)	Abdulhashim Mutalov	Bill Clinton	
September 11, 1996	October 9, 1996	Sodiq Safoyev	Сафаев,Садык Салихович		Oʻtkir Sultonov	Bill Clinton	
June 4, 2001	June 20, 2001	Shavkat Shadievich Khamrakulov	Хамракулов, Шамбат Шадиевич		Oʻtkir Sultonov	George W. Bush	
October 31, 2003	December 4, 2003	Abdulaziz Komilov	ru:Камилов, Абдулазиз Хафизович		Oʻtkir Sultonov	George W. Bush	
February 26, 2010	March 29, 2013	Ilhomjon Tuychievich Nematov	Нематов, Ильхом Туйчиевич	(* May 1, 1952)	Shavkat Mirziyoyev	Barack Obama	
July 12, 2013	April 1, 2017	Bakhtiyar Turadjanovich Gulyamov	Гулямов, Бахтияр Тураджанович	(*February 18, 1964, in Moscow.): From 2005 to 2009 he was Uzbek ambassador to Germany. With concurrent accreditation to Switzerland, Sweden and the Czech Republic.; From 2010 ton 2012 he was Uzbek Ambassador to Belgium with concurrent accreditation to the European Union and to the NATO.	Shavkat Mirziyoyev	Barack Obama	
October 12, 2017		Javlon Abdujalilovich Vakhabov	Вахабов, Жавлон Абдужалилович	(*August 7, 1980, in Tashkent.): 2001 – 2006 Referent, attaché, third secretary, acting head of division, Treaty-Law Department, Ministry of Foreign Affairs of the Republic of Uzbekistan.; 2006 – 2011 Leading consultant, chief consultant, National Security Council under the President of the Republic of Uzbekistan.; 2011 – 2013 Deputy Secretary, National Security Council under the President of the Republic of Uzbekistan.; 2013 – 2013 Director, Institute of Strategic and Interregional Studies under the President of the Republic of Uzbekistan.; 2013 – 2015 Deputy Minister, Ministry of Foreign Affairs of the Republic of Uzbekistan.; 2015 – 2017 First Deputy Minister, Ministry of Foreign Affairs of the Republic of Uzbekistan.	Shavkat Mirziyoyev	Donald Trump	
March 3, 2023		Furkat Siddikov			Abdulla Aripov	Joe Biden	

- Uzbekistan–United States relations
