= List of ambassadors of Uzbekistan to China =

Coordinates: 39.942795°N 116.451533°E

Ambassador of Uzbekistan to China
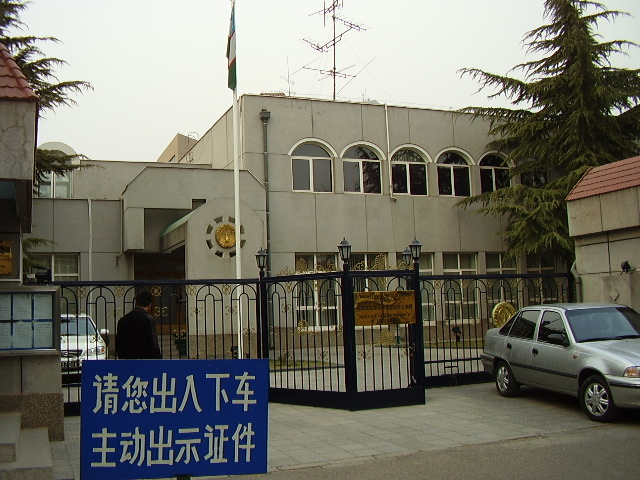
- Incumbent; Bakhtiyor Saidov since September 13, 2017
- Inaugural holder: Shavkat Arifdzhanovich Alimov
- Formation: December 15, 1995

The Uzbek Ambassador in Beijing is the official representative of the Government in Tashkent to the Government of the People's Republic of China.

== List of representatives ==
Diplomatic agrément/Diplomatic accreditation	Ambassador	Russian language	Observations	Prime Minister of Uzbekistan	Premier of the People's Republic of China	Term end
May 1995			An Uzbek Embassy in Beijing was opened.	Abdulhashim Mutalov	Li Peng	
December 15, 1995	Shavkat Arifdzhanovich Alimov	Алимов, Шавкат Арифджанович		Abdulhashim Mutalov	Li Peng	
April 16, 1999	Ismatilla Ergashev	Эргашев назначен, Исматилла		Oʻtkir Sultonov	Zhu Rongji	
August 4, 2003	Nosirzhon Sobirovich Yusupov	Юсупов, Носиржон Собирович		Oʻtkir Sultonov	Wen Jiabao	
August 25, 2007	Salakhitdinov Alisher Alakhitdinovich	Алахитдинович, Салахитдинов Алишер	In 1979 he graduated from the Tashkent State University with a degree in Oriental Studies.; In 1998 Master's degree of International Relations from the Academy of State and Social Construction.; In 1982 he was second secretary at the Embassy of the USSR in Kabul.; From 1993 to 1995 he was 3rd secretary, head of the sector, deputy head of the department, deputy head of the CIS department of the Ministry of Foreign Affairs of the Republic of Uzbekistan, Consul of the Embassy of Uzbekistan in Ukraine.; In 1997 he was head of the Department of International Economic Organizations, Ministry of Foreign Affairs of the Republic of Uzbekistan; From January 1999 to September 2007 he was Uzbek Ambassador to Kyrgyzstan.; On August 25, 2007 he has appointed Ambassador in Beijing.; He was Uzbek Ambassador to Kazakhstan.; He speaks Russian, English, Persian.	Shavkat Mirziyoyev	Wen Jiabao	
May 23, 2012	Kurbanov Daniyar Djavdatovich	Курбанов Данияр Джавдатович		Shavkat Mirziyoyev	Wen Jiabao	
July 26, 2017	Bakhtiyor Saidov					
December 28, 2021	Farhod Arziev					
