= United States–Uzbekistan relations =

- United States: Uzbekistan

Diplomatic mission
- Embassy of Uzbekistan, Washington D.C.: United States Embassy, Tashkent

United States–Uzbekistan relations formally began on 19 February 1992, days after the United States recognized the independence of Uzbekistan on 25 December 1991. United States–Uzbekistan relations developed slowly and reached a peak following the U.S. decision to invade Afghanistan following the September 11, 2001 attacks. Relations cooled significantly following the "color revolutions" in the former Soviet republics of Georgia, Ukraine, and Kyrgyzstan in 2003–2005, and the Government of Uzbekistan sought to limit the influence of U.S. and other foreign non-governmental organizations (NGOs) working on civil society, political reform, and human rights inside the country.

Relations improved slightly in the latter half of 2007, but the U.S. continues to call for Uzbekistan to meet all of its commitments under the March 2002 Declaration of Strategic Partnership between the two countries. The declaration covers not only security and economic relations but political reform, economic reform, and human rights. Uzbekistan has Central Asia's largest population and is vital to U.S., regional, and international efforts to promote stability and security.

According to a 2002 Pew global opinion poll, 85% of Uzbeks view the United States favorably, compared with only 10% who viewed the U.S. negatively. According to the 2012 Gallup U.S. Global Leadership Report, 40% of Uzbeks approve of U.S. leadership, with 22% disapproving and 39% expressing uncertainty.

== Bilateral relations ==
=== Trade and investment ===
Trade relations are regulated by a bilateral trade agreement entered into force January 14, 1994. It provides for extension of most-favored-nation trade status between the two countries. The U.S. additionally granted Uzbekistan exemption from many U.S. import tariffs under the Generalized System of Preferences (GSP status) on August 17, 1994. A Bilateral Investment Treaty was signed December 16, 1994; it has been ratified by Uzbekistan and received advice and consent of the U.S. Senate in October 2000. However, the Bilateral Investment Treaty will be unlikely to enter into force until Uzbekistan embarks on economic reform. The government is taking some modest steps to reduce the bureaucratic restraints on the nascent private sector.

=== Assistance ===
The United States' humanitarian and technical assistance to Uzbekistan has decreased markedly since 2004, both as a result of government actions against U.S. implementing partners and U.S. Government restrictions on aid. Since its independence, the U.S. has provided technical support to Uzbekistan's efforts to restructure its economy and to improve its environment, education, and health care system, provided support to nascent NGOs, and provided equipment to improve water availability and quality in the Aral Sea region. Through the U.S. Agency for International Development (USAID) and the embassy's Public Affairs Section, the U.S. government continues to support educational and professional exchanges and other programs that offer Uzbeks the opportunity to study in the United States and to establish professional contacts with their American counterparts. The Departments of State and Defense provide technical assistance in the form of equipment and training to enhance Uzbekistan's control over its borders and its capabilities to interdict the illicit movement of narcotics, people, and goods, including potential weapons of mass destruction-related items. In FY 2003, the United States provided roughly $87.4 million in humanitarian aid, technical assistance, military-to-military funding, and micro-credit support in Uzbekistan. U.S. assistance grew to approximately $101.8 million in FY 2004, but fell to $92.6 million in FY 2005. These programs were designed to promote market reform and to establish a foundation for an open, prosperous, democratic society. Starting in 2004, the Secretary of State has been unable to certify that Uzbekistan has met its obligations under the bilateral 2002 Strategic Framework Agreement. As a result, U.S. assistance declined to approximately $20 million in FY 2006.

However, after the supply routes through Pakistan were interrupted in 2012, the ban on military assistance to Uzbekistan was pragmatically lifted.

USAID provides both technical and humanitarian assistance. Technical assistance to Uzbekistan promotes sound fiscal and management policies, a strengthened business-enabling environment, enhanced competitiveness of the agribusiness sector, increased citizens' participation in civil society and economic decision making, improved sustainability of social benefits and services, reduced environmental risks to public health, and other multi-sector reform programs. The USAID/Central Asian Republics Uzbekistan health program focuses on four chief needs: primary health care reform, HIV/AIDS and infectious disease control, drug demand reduction, and reproductive and maternal and child health. Programs are designed to develop local capacity and promote mechanisms for citizens to engage with their local government. U.S. government funds also support the work of non-governmental organizations to prevent trafficking in persons and care for victims. USAID supports the Institute for New Democracies in initiatives to strengthen the protection of human rights.

Peace Corps staff arrived in Uzbekistan in August 1992, and a bilateral agreement to establish the Peace Corps in Uzbekistan was signed 4 November 1992. The first volunteers arrived in December 1992. Peace Corps Volunteers were active in English teaching, small business development, public health, and women's issues. However, Uzbekistan failed to renew visas for Peace Corps volunteers in 2005, ending the Peace Corps presence in the country. Department of State-managed exchange programs, farmer-to-farmer exchanges, and the Department of Commerce's Special American Business Internship Training Program (SABIT) contribute to expansion of technical know-how and support bilateral relations. The U.S. also provides export finance/guarantees and political risk insurance for U.S. exporters and investors through the U.S. Export-Import Bank and the Overseas Private Investment Corporation (OPIC). Proceeds from the U.S. Department of Agriculture's Commodity Monetization Program are scheduled to finance more than 30 farmer assistance and rural development projects which were approved jointly by U.S. and Uzbek officials in 2005. Some of the selected projects are already underway.

=== Post-Karimov era ===
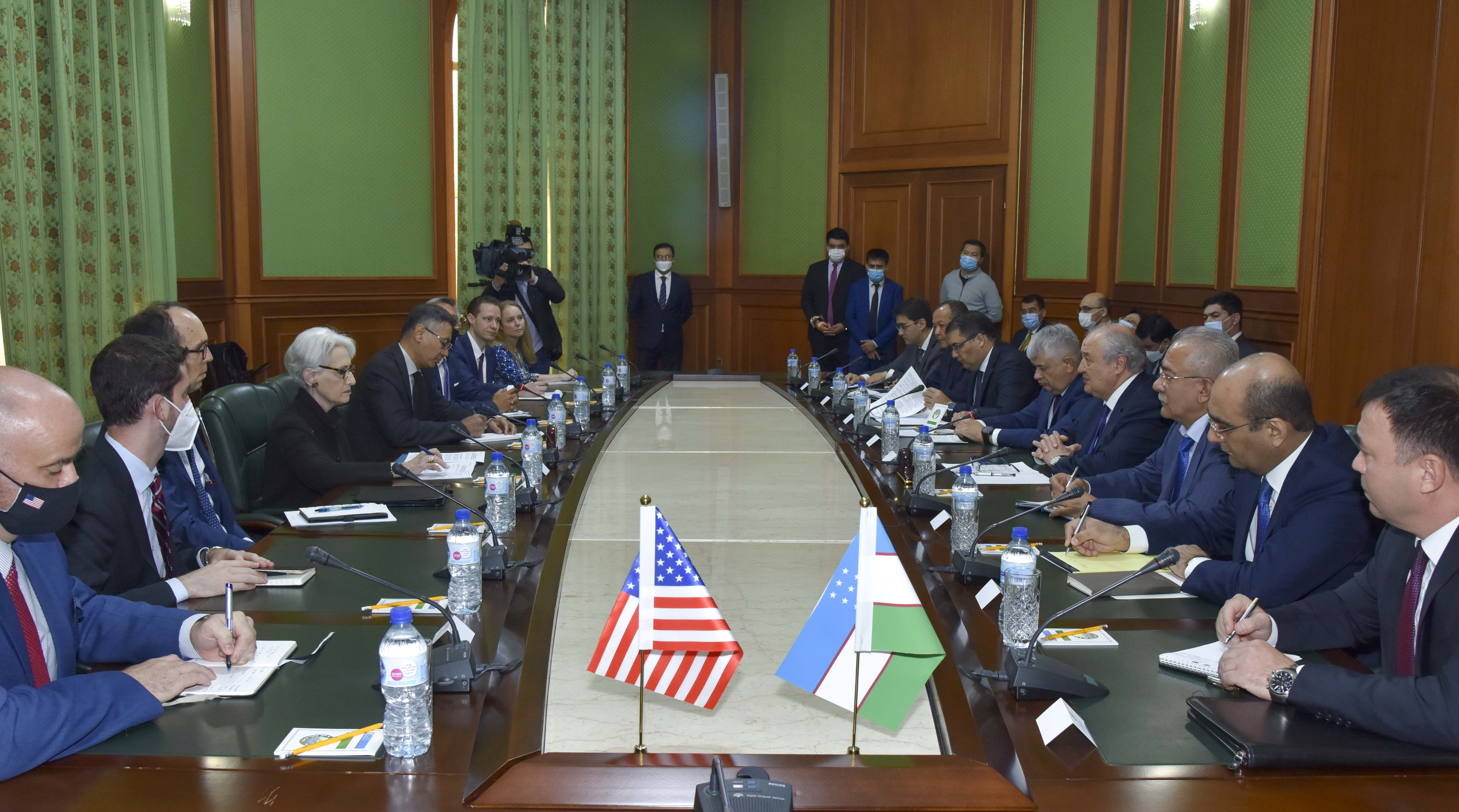
US officials (left), led by Deputy Secretary of State Wendy Sherman, meet with Uzbek officials (right), led by Foreign Minister Abdulaziz Kamilov, in 2021

Human rights conditions in Uzbekistan under President Shavkat Mirziyoyev have improved slightly because he wants to assure investors, like the United States, that their investments will not be adversely affected by political instability. The government of Uzbekistan has promised an improvement of human rights conditions with optimistic rhetoric on the international stage through The National Action Strategy of 2012–2017, which was a push for reforms that "pledge to improve public administration, strengthen protections for vulnerable segments of the population, liberalize the economy, and increase judicial independence." This plan includes social and economic reforms because Mirziyoyev understands that economic liberalization needs to happen simultaneously with social reform. Not only does this show Western countries stability, but also a willingness to align more with the United States ideals, making it easier for the United States to justify a close economic relationship with Uzbekistan.

Additionally, Uzbekistan has shown a willingness to liberalize the country through not only domestic reform but also diplomatic visits. President Mirziyoyev met Donald Trump on 16 May 2018 at the White House, becoming the first Uzbek president to officially visit the United States since March 2002. Mirziyoyev's shift towards the United States aligns with his previously mentioned goal of transforming Uzbekistan's economy by developing a strong relationship with United States. This in turn will facilitate the process of obtaining loans in international institutions like the World Bank because of the influence the US holds in these institutions.

In regards to security cooperation, Mirziyoyev wants the United States to follow its foreign policy towards Afghanistan of increasing the efficiency of the Afghan national security. With US support, Uzbekistan can more effectively fight terrorism and drug trafficking. Although there are signs of liberalization, Uzbekistan's emphasis remains fixed on security. Thus, Uzbekistan must continue to undergo significant reform to fit the United States definition of democracy. This mixed record and slow progress of human rights improvement is best exemplified in its actions in October 2017: when it freed 5 long-held political prisoners but that same month also arbitrarily detained an author and journalist.

According to a report by Reuters, the United States ran a propaganda campaign to spread disinformation about the Sinovac Chinese COVID-19 vaccine, including using fake social media accounts to spread the disinformation that the Sinovac vaccine contained pork-derived ingredients and was therefore haram under Islamic law. Uzbekistan was among the Central Asian countries targeted in the campaign, which ran from the spring of 2020 to mid-2021.

== Military relations ==
Following the 9/11 terrorist attacks in the United States, Uzbekistan approved of the U.S. Central Command's request for access to an air base, the Karshi-Khanabad airfield, in southern Uzbekistan, to station 1,500 of its armed forces, in exchange for security guarantees and assistance with its own internal terrorism. Despite his human rights record, Uzbek President Islam Karimov condemned Saddam Hussein and supported the controversial Iraq War, and continued allowing the U.S. to place troops on the ground as well as use the Uzbek airbase, K2, for support activities and for deployment and command and control of Special Forces into all of Afghanistan except for the Khandahar region. However, Uzbekistan demanded that the U.S. withdraw from the airbases after the 2005 Andijan massacre and the critical U.S. reaction to the incident. Following year Uzbekistan formally joined the Collective Security Treaty Organization (CSTO).

In 2012, Uzbekistan opted to formally withdraw from the Russian-led CSTO alliance, leading some to debate whether such a move indicated a shift in its foreign policy to the West, possibly influenced by its increasingly vital strategic position in Central Asia and NATO's withdrawal from neighboring Afghanistan. However, Uzbekistan remains a part of the Shanghai Cooperation Organisation, of which both Russia and China are part of, and of which it is the only non-founding member.

Amid the American exit and Taliban takeover of Afghanistan in August 2021, the Afghan Air Force flew 22 American military planes and 24 helicopters to Uzbekistan. In August 2024, the United States and Uzbekistan formalised an agreement to form a joint program that would permit the latter country to keep the aircraft with American technical assistance.

== Diplomatic visits ==
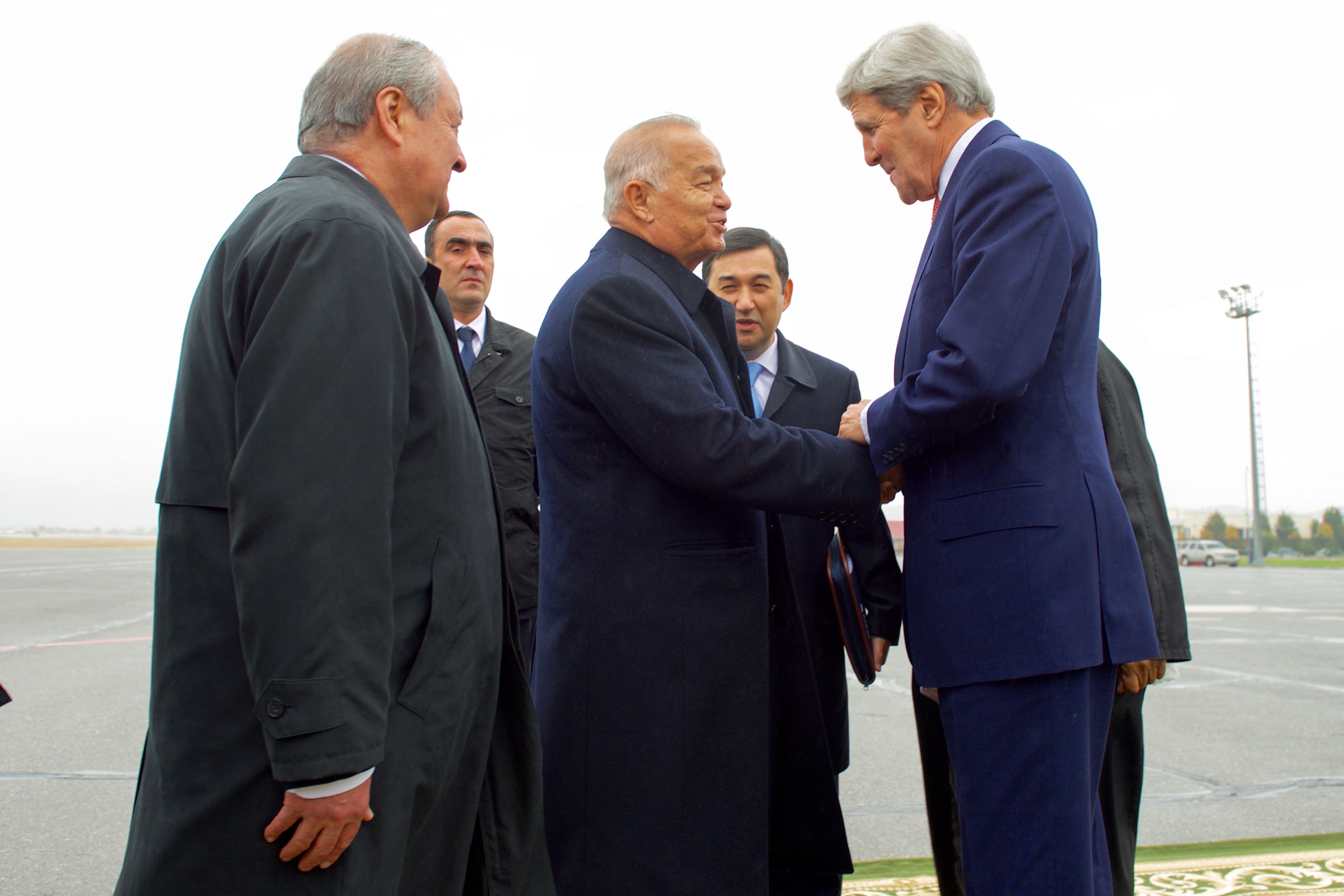
U.S. Secretary Kerry shakes hands with the Uzbek President Islam Karimov at Samarkand International Airport, 2015

U.S. Secretary of State James Addison Baker visited Tashkent and Samarkand on February 16, 1992 and met with Uzbekistan's main opposition party, Birlik, a year after the country's independence from the Soviet Union. In April 2000, Secretary of State Madeleine Albright visited Uzbekistan to meet with President Karimov, where they discussed the distinction between Muslim terrorists and peaceful Muslims. In December 2001, Secretary of State Colin Powell visited Uzbekistan to witness the reopening of the Afghanistan–Uzbekistan Friendship Bridge. During his visit, Secretary Powell also met with Uzbek Foreign Minister Abdulaziz Komilov and President Karimov to discuss the security of Central Asia. Secretary of State Hillary Clinton visited Uzbekistan twice in her tenure, in December 2010 and October 2011. In November 2015, Secretary of State John Kerry visited Samarkand as part of his Central Asian tour to reassure the multilateral ties between the United States and the Central Asian nations.

In March 2002, Uzbek President Islam Karimov visited Washington, D.C. to meet with U.S. President George W. Bush at the White House. The two presidents signed a "declaration" that would enhance Uzbekistan's security and law enforcement agencies.

United States Secretary of State Antony Blinken visited Tashkent on February 28, 2023. Blinken arrived in Tashkent from Astana where he took part in the meeting of foreign ministers of Central Asian nations in the C5+1 format.

== Donald Trump's second presidency ==
On February 21, 2025, Secretary of State Marco Rubio met with Uzbek Foreign Minister Bakhtiyor Saidov, reaffirming U.S. commitment to the C5+1 diplomatic framework, first launched in 2015 and elevated under Biden. The U.S. aims to boost trade, investment, and cooperation in critical minerals, nuclear energy, and WTO accession. The talks also covered migration, with Uzbekistan agreeing to accept deported citizens. Additionally, Uzbekistan is leading regional efforts to engage the Taliban, fostering trade with Afghanistan to enhance Central Asia's economic leverage.

On 30 April 2025, U.S. Labor Secretary Lori Chavez-DeRemer announced the termination of over $38 million in foreign aid programs during a cabinet meeting, including funds designated for a project aimed at improving labor conditions in Uzbekistan's cotton industry. The program, launched in August 2022 and originally scheduled to run through 2026, had received $2 million in its first year and was set to receive another $1 million in 2025. The initiative sought to enhance transparency and combat forced labor practices, which had historically plagued Uzbekistan's cotton sector. The aid cuts were presented as part of the administration's "America Last" rollback of programs deemed inconsistent with U.S. priorities. Chavez-DeRemer credited the Department of Government Efficiency (DOGE), led by Elon Musk, with identifying "fraud" and unnecessary spending.

In parallel with the aid cuts, the Trump administration also intensified its deportation efforts. On 30 April 2025, the Department of Homeland Security announced the deportation of 131 Central Asian migrants, including individuals from Uzbekistan, under a bilateral agreement with Tashkent. The move was framed by Homeland Security Secretary Kristi Noem as part of an ongoing collaboration to enhance "mutual security and uphold the rule of law". While the Trump administration pledged to deport millions of undocumented migrants, critics raised concerns about due process and humanitarian implications of the policy.

== Resident diplomatic missions ==
- United States has an embassy in Tashkent.
- Uzbekistan has an embassy in Washington, D.C. and consulates-general in New York City and Seattle.
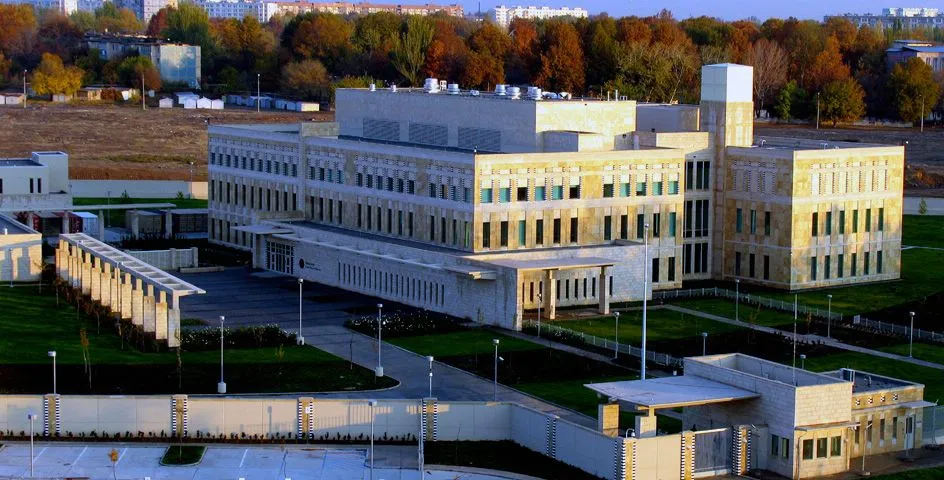
Embassy of the United States in Tashkent

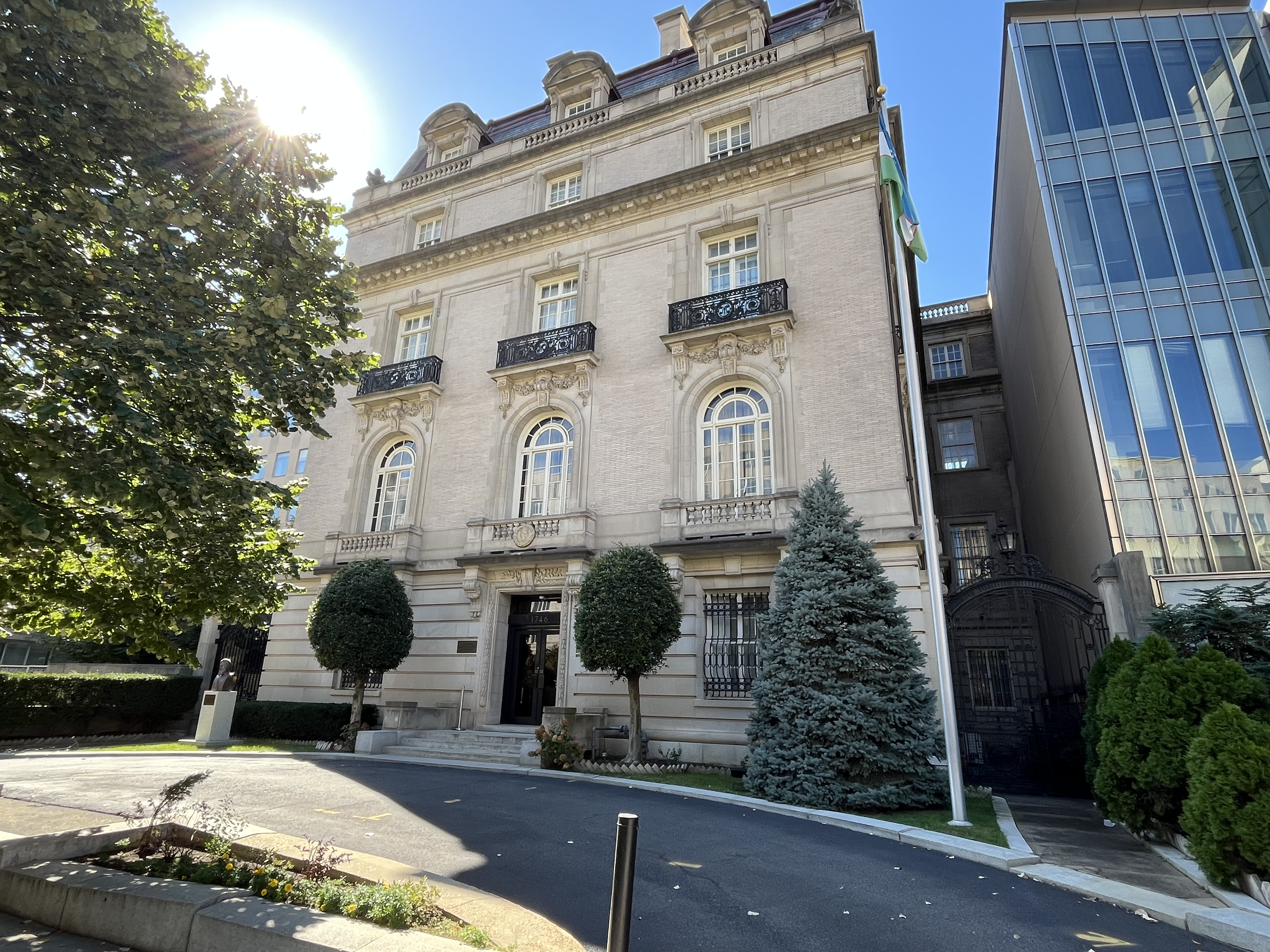
Embassy of Uzbekistan in Washington, D.C.

== See also ==
- Uzbek Americans
