= Ergashev =

Ergashev is a surname. Notable people with the surname include:

- Davronjon Ergashev (born 1988), Tajik footballer
- Ismatilla Ergashev, ambassador of Uzbekistan to Azerbaijan
- Jahongir Ergashev (born 1994), Tajik footballer
- Mubin Ergashev (born 1973), Tajik professional football coach
