= Croatia–Uzbekistan relations =

- Croatia: Uzbekistan

Envoy
- Croatian ambassador to Uzbekistan Refik Šabanović: Uzbek ambassador to Croatia Oybek Shakhavdinov

Croatia–Uzbekistan relations refers to the bilateral relations between Croatia and Uzbekistan. Croatia is accredited to Uzbekistan through its embassy in Astana. Uzbekistan is accredited to Croatia through its embassy in Budapest. Croatia established diplomatic ties and recognized the independence of Uzbekistan on February 6, 1995.

== History ==
In November 2024, Uzbek ambassador to Croatia, Oybek Shakhavdinov, travelled to Zagreb, where the two nations would discuss cooperation between economy and tourism. Shakhavdinov welcomed Croatian companies to explore opportunities within the region.

In 2025, the two nations celebrated 30 years of friendship.

In February 2025, Uzbek deputy foreign minister, Olimjon Abdullaev, met with Croatian state secretary for political affairs, Frano Matušić. Both nations were joyous about visits between both countries. Matušić states that Croatia considers Uzbekistan an important political and economic partner in Central Asia. He also thanked Uzbekistan for hosting the first ever EU-Central Asia summit.

In July 2025, the minister of trade, investment, and industry for Uzbekistan, Laziz Kudratov, communicated online with the Croatian minister of economy, Ante Šušnjar, about deepening trade and economic cooperation.

In May 2026, Presidential Advisor on Foreign Policy, Abdulaziz Kamilov, travelled to Zagreb, and met with Prime Minister of Crotaia, Oleg Butković, where the two nations discussed transport, digitalization, and logistics cooperation.

In June 2026, Foreign Minister of Uzbekistan, Bakhtiyor Saidov, met with Croatian prime minister Andrej Plenković. The two nations signed a cooperation between both foreign ministries that runs from 2027 to 2028.

== High-level visits ==
High level visits from Croatia to Uzbekistan

High level visits from Uzbekistan to Croatia

- Oybek Shakhavdinov (November 2024)
- Abdulaziz Kamilov (May 2026)
- Bakhtiyor Saidov (June 2026)

== See also ==
- Foreign relations of Croatia
- Foreign relations of Uzbekistan
