= Cyprus–Uzbekistan relations =

- Cyprus: Uzbekistan

Envoy
- Cypriot ambassador to Uzbekistan Kypros Giorgallis: Uzbek ambassador to Cyprus Abat Fayzullayev

Cyprus–Uzbekistan relations refer to the bilateral relations between Cyprus and Uzbekistan. Cyprus recognized the independence of Uzbekistan and established diplomatic ties on May 30, 1997. Cyprus has an honorary consulate in Tashkent. Uzbekistan is accredited to Cyprus through its embassy in Rome.

== History ==
In July 2024, representatives from the Cyprus Chamber of Commerce and Industry flew out to Tashkent to hold foreign ministry political consultations. Both nations discussed deepening bilateral ties.

In October 2025, Uzbek foreign minister, Bakhtiyor Saidov, met with Cypriot foreign minister, Constantinos Kombos, yet again, both nations discussed deepening bilateral ties and cooperation.

In June 2026, Cypriot foreign minister, Constantinos Kombos, visited Tashkent, where the two nations maintained high diplomatic relations with each other.

== High-level visits ==
High level visits from Cyprus to Uzbekistan

- Constantinos Kombos (June 2026)

High level visits from Uzbekistan to Cyprus

== See Also ==
- Foreign relations of Cyprus
- Foreign relations of Uzbekistan
