= Shahlo Mahmudova =

Uzbekistani politician

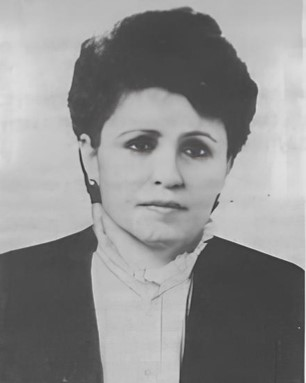

Minister of Foreign Affairs
- In office 16 September 1991 – 6 November 1992
- President: Islam Karimov
- Preceded by: Office established
- Succeeded by: Ubaydulla Abdurazzoqov

Personal details
- Born: 28 February 1944 (age 82) Tashkent, Uzbek SSR, Soviet Union
- Party: CPSU
- Education: Tashkent Institute of Textile and Light Industry
- Awards: Order of the Badge of Honour

Shahlo Nasimovna Mahmudova (born 28 February 1944) is an Uzbek politician. She was the first Minister of Foreign Affairs of the country after independence, serving from 1991 until 1992.

Mahmudova received her education at the Taskhent Textile Institute, and began her political career with the Young Communist League (Komsomol) in the Soviet era. Eventually she rose to become secretary of the Komsomol of the Uzbek SSR. Soon after independence, President Islam Karimov named her Minister of Foreign Affairs, at the same time decreeing that Zokir Almatov should become Minister of Internal Affairs. It was rumored that her appointment was due to the influence of Shukrullo Mirsaidov. She did not last long in the position; events during her ministry included the entry of Uzbekistan into the United Nations and a state visit by the President of Turkey. She also met with representatives of the government of the United States during her tenure. Otherwise she did not play a major role in the diplomatic life of her country, and during her time at the ministry she kept a relatively low political profile. Later in her career she became Head of the Department for Attracting Foreign Investments and International Cooperation at the Center for Special Secondary Vocational Education, and also worked at the Ministry of Foreign Affairs.

== Awards and honours ==
Country	Decoration	Date of issue
Soviet Union	Order of the Badge of Honour	17 June 1981
