= Ismatilla Ergashev =

Uzbek diplomat

Ismatilla Raimovich Ergashev (Исматилла Раимович Эргашев) is the ambassador of Uzbekistan to Azerbaijan. On 16 April 1999 he was accredited as Uzbek Ambassador to China.

== See also ==
- Azerbaijan-Uzbekistan relations
