= Slovenia–Uzbekistan relations =

- Slovenia: Uzbekistan

Slovenia–Uzbekistan relations are the bilateral relations between Slovenia and Uzbekistan. Diplomatic ties between the two nations were established on January 16, 1995. Slovenia has an honorary consultant in Tashkent. Uzbekistan is accredited to Slovenia through its embassy in Budapest.

== History ==
In February 2023, the two nations signed the Agreement on Economic Cooperation between Uzbekistan and Slovenia. Trade between two nations went up by 40% for the past year. The two nations also discussed establishing charter and regular flights between Ljubljana and Tashkent. The Uzbek delegation was headed by prime minister of Uzbekistan, Jamshid Khodjaev, whole the Slovenian delegation was headed by prime minister of Slovenia, Tanja Fajon.

In May 2025, Uzbek president Shavkat Mirziyoyev met in Ljubljana for an official state visit and spoke with Slovenian president Nataša Pirc Musar, Slovenian prime minister Robert Golob, and national assembly speaker Urška Klakočar Zupančič. During this meeting the two nations plan to increase trade turnover by €500 million. Both nations signed bilateral agreements of which include visa exemptions for diplomatic passport holders, cooperation in education, science, transportation, logistics, culture, and tourism.

In November 2025, Slovenian foreign minister Tanja Fajon and Uzbek minister of industry, investment, and trade Laziz Kudratov co-chaired the joint Slovenian-Uzbek commission in Ljubljana to deepen trade and economic cooperation.

In June 2026, the minister of foreign affairs of Uzbekistan, Bakhtiyor Saidov, met with minister of foreign affairs of Slovenia, Tone Kajzer. The two nations reached an understanding on expanding trade, economic, and investment cooperation.

== Trade ==
In 2024 the two nations reached US$176,000,000. This makes Uzbekistan Slovenia's second biggest trade partner in Central Asia.

Uzbekistan's exports includes textiles, fruits, vegetables, garments, and chemical products.

Slovenia's exports includes pharmaceuticals, machinery, ceramics, and furniture.

== High-level visits ==
High level visits from Slovenia to Uzbekistan

High level visits from Uzbekistan to Slovenia

- Shavkat Mirziyoyev (May 2025)

== See also ==
- Foreign relations of Slovenia
- Foreign relations of Uzbekistan
