= Embassy of the United States, Tashkent =

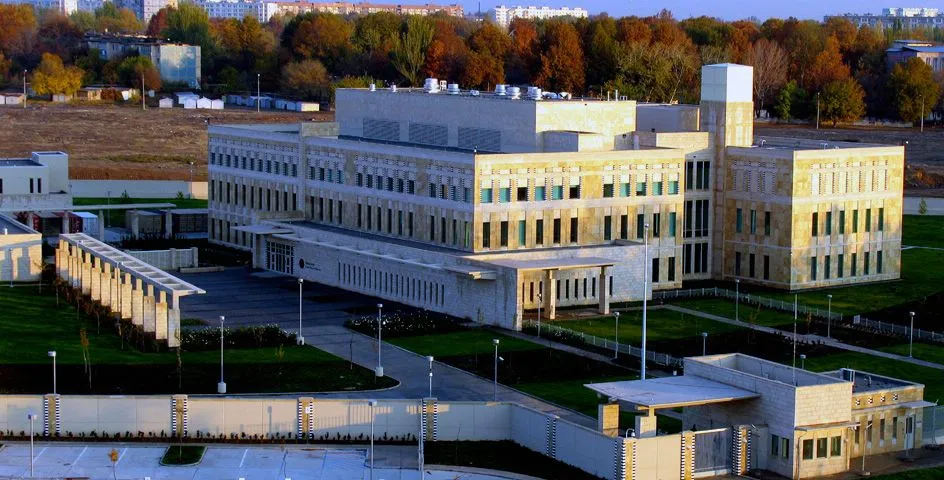
- Location: Tashkent, Uzbekistan
- Address: 3 Maykurgan Street, Тоshkent 100093, Uzbekistan
- Coordinates: 41°22′1″N 69°16′19″E
- Website: https://uz.usembassy.gov

The Embassy of the United States in Tashkent is the diplomatic mission of the United States of America in Uzbekistan.

== History ==
The United States was one of the first countries to recognize Uzbekistan as an independent state. On December 25, 1991, President George H. W. Bush recognized Uzbekistan’s independence in an address concerning the dissolution of the Soviet Union. Subsequently, the American Embassy in Tashkent was established on March 16, 1992, with Michael Mozur serving as the Chargé d'Affaires ad interim. Uzbekistan had previously been a constituent republic of the USSR, and it briefly joined the United States as an ally in the war on terror.

Initially, the embassy was located in the Chilanzar district, on Chilanzarskaya Street. In February 2006, the American Embassy in Uzbekistan moved to a new embassy complex in the Yunusabad district, on Maykurgan Street.

In the broader regional context, the embassy functions within the framework of the C5+1 diplomatic platform involving the United States and the five Central Asian Republics: Kazakhstan, the Kyrgyz Republic, Tajikistan, Turkmenistan, and Uzbekistan.

== See also ==
- Embassy of Uzbekistan, Washington, D.C.
- List of ambassadors of the United States to Uzbekistan
- United States–Uzbekistan relations
