= Luxembourg–Uzbekistan relations =

- Luxembourg: Uzbekistan

Envoy
- Luxembourg ambassador to Uzbekistan Thomas Reisen: Uzbek ambassador to Luxembourg Gayrat Fazilov

Luxembourg–Uzbekistan relations refer to the bilateral relations between Luxembourg and Uzbekistan. Luxembourg is accredited to Uzbekistan through its embassy in Moscow. Luxembourg also has an honorary consulate in Tashkent. Uzbekistan is accredited to Luxembourg through its embassy in Brussels. Luxembourg recognized the independence of Uzbekistan on June 10, 1992, through an exchange of notes. Luxembourg also started diplomatic relations with Uzbekistan on June 10, 1992.

== History ==
On October 21, 2025, Uzbek foreign minister, Bakhtiyor Saidov, met with Luxembourg's prime minister, Xavier Bettel, in Luxembourg. Later, on October 24, in Brussels, both nations discussed bilateral relations between each other and signed the Enhanced Partnership and Cooperation Agreement. Both Luxembourg and Uzbekistan expressed concern over humanitarian situation in Afghanistan, emphasizing the state of women.

In June 2026, the foreign ministry of Luxembourg led by Gilles Bauer travelled to Uzbekistan to make their second round of political consultations in Uzbekistan. The nations discussed bilateral cooperation and economic cooperation. During this meeting, the delegation met with the Benelux Chamber of Commerce and multiple Luxembourg businesses operating in Uzbekistan do discuss the chamber and its activities. The two nations also discussed the trade mission of the Luxembourg Chamber of Commerce to Uzbekistan in October 2026.

In March 2026, Uzbek ambassador to the Benelux countries, Gayrat Fazilov, met with Yves Kruchten, the vice-chair of the Committee on International Affairs of the Chamber of Deputies of Luxembourg, to discuss how both nations can move their cooperation to the next level.

== High-level visits ==
High level visits from Luxembourg to Uzbekistan

- Gilles Bauer (June 2026)

High level visits from Uzbekistan to Luxembourg

- Bakhtiyor Saidov (October 21, 2025)

== See also ==
- Foreign relations of Luxembourg
- Foreign relations of Uzbekistan
