= Finland–Uzbekistan relations =

- Finland: Uzbekistan

Finland–Uzbekistan relations refer to the bilateral relations between Finland and Uzbekistan. Diplomatic ties between the two nations were established on February 26, 1992. Finland is accredited to Uzbekistan through its embassy in Astana, though Finland also has a roving ambassador who resides in Helsinki accredited to Uzbekistan. Uzbekistan is accredited to Finland through its embassy in Riga. Finland recognized the independence of Uzbekistan on December 30, 1991.

== History ==
In October 2025, Finnish president Alexander Stubb met with Uzbek president Shavkat Mirziyoyev in Tashkent and they both discussed bilateral trade, education, and regional geopolitics between Europe and Central Asia. In the meeting, Alexander Stubb stated "Uzbekistan is confidently moving forward thanks to modern reforms."

In March 2026 Uzbek foreign minister Bakhtiyor Saidov met with Finnish foreign minister Elina Valtonen and Finnish president Alexander Stubb in Helsinki. Both nations discussed relations between Finland and Uzbekistan as well as security policy issues.

== Trade ==
In 2020 the two countries traded with each other for US$48.45 million.

In 2024 the two countries traded with each other for US$151.7 million.

== High-level visits ==
High level visits from Finland to Uzbekistan

- Mauno Koivisto (October 1992)
- Alexander Stubb (October 2025)

High level visits from Uzbekistan to Finland

- Bakhtiyor Saidov (March 2026)

== See also ==
- Foreign relations of Finland
- Foreign relations of Uzbekistan
