= Elyor Ganiyev =

Uzbekistani politician

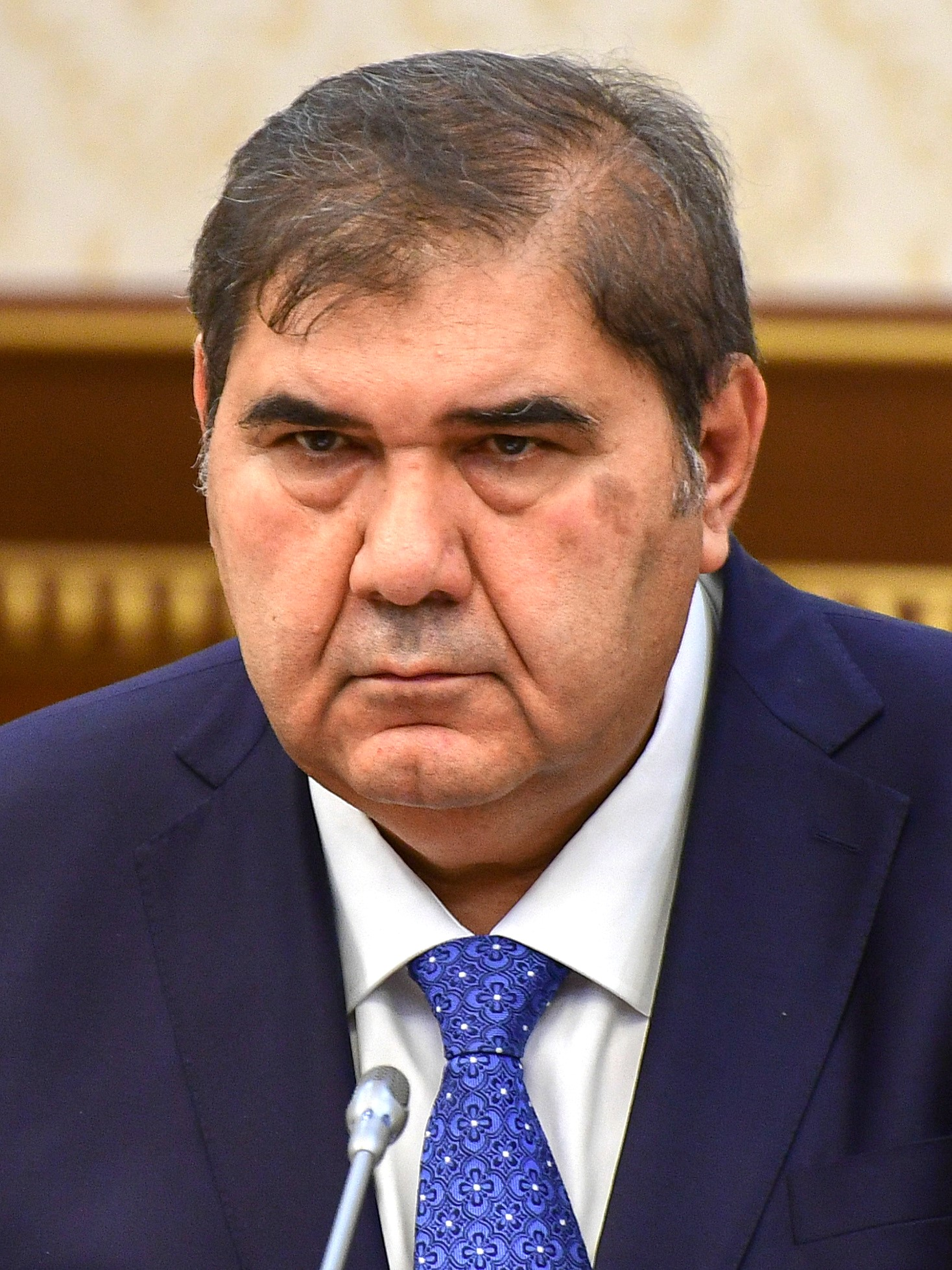
- Ganiyev in 2019

Minister of Foreign Affairs
- In office December 28, 2010 – January 13, 2012
- President: Islam Karimov
- Preceded by: Vladimir Norov
- Succeeded by: Abdulaziz Komilov
- In office February 4, 2005 – July 12, 2006
- Preceded by: Sodiq Safoyev
- Succeeded by: Vladimir Norov

Personal details
- Born: January 7, 1960 (age 66) Sirdaryo Region, Uzbek SSR, USSR

Elyor Majidovich G‘aniyev (also transliterated as Elyar Ganiyev and Elyer Ganiev; born January 7, 1960) is an Uzbek politician who has served as Minister of Foreign Affairs of Uzbekistan and Deputy Prime Minister of Uzbekistan from February 4, 2005 to July 12, 2006. Uzbek President Islam Karimov appointed and removed Ganiev from that position.

Ganiyev announced on October 19, 2006 in the International Uzbek Cotton Fair in Tashkent that Uzbekistan is expected to produce over 1 million tons of cotton fibers in 2007. The Government plans on exporting 750,000–800,000 tons. In July 2013, Ganiyev held the office of Minister of Foreign Economic Relations, Investments, & Trade.
