= Latvia–Uzbekistan relations =

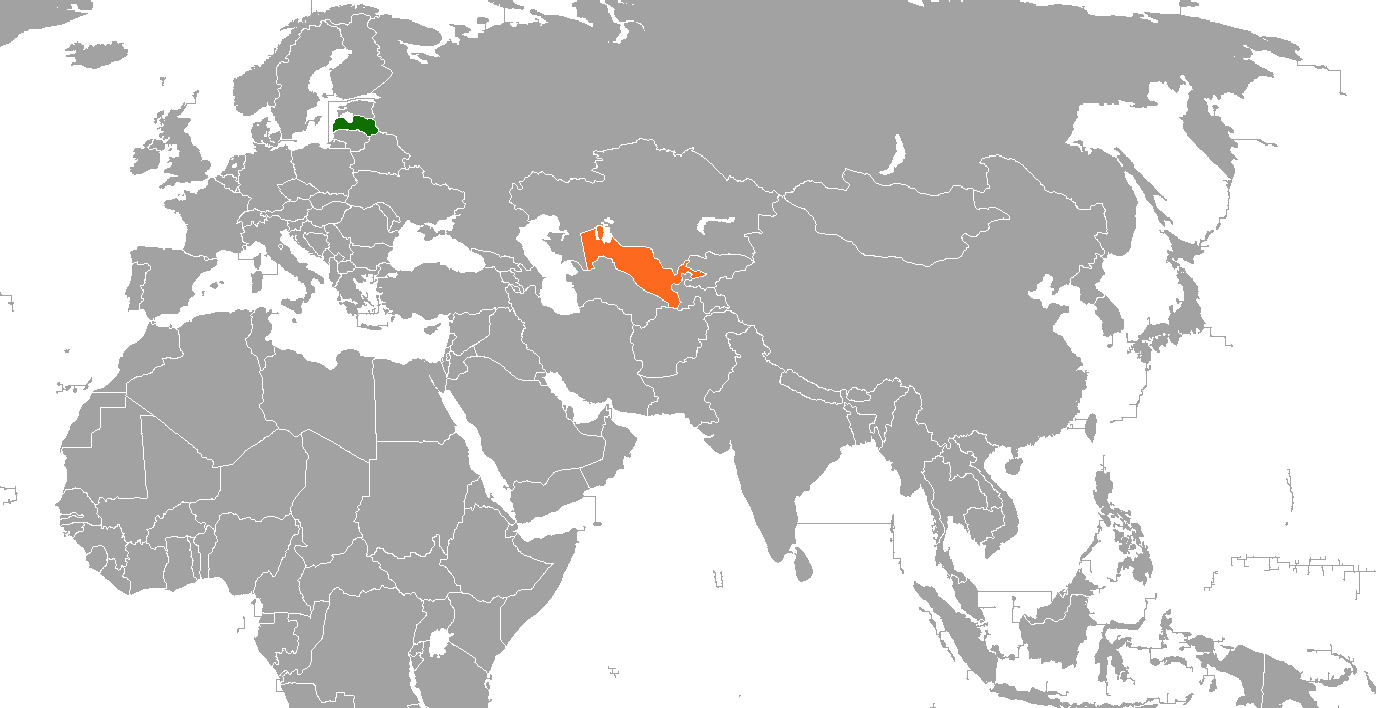

- Latvia: Uzbekistan

Latvia–Uzbekistan relations are the bilateral relations between Latvia and Uzbekistan. Diplomatic relations between the two countries were established on 3 November 1992. Both countries were Soviet socialist republics of the USSR from 1940 until 1991. Latvia has an embassy in Tashkent which is also accredited to Tajikistan and Turkmenistan, and in which Estonia issues visas to Uzbeks, and Uzbekistan has an embassy in Riga which is also accredited to Lithuania. Both countries are full members of the Organization for Security and Co-operation in Europe.

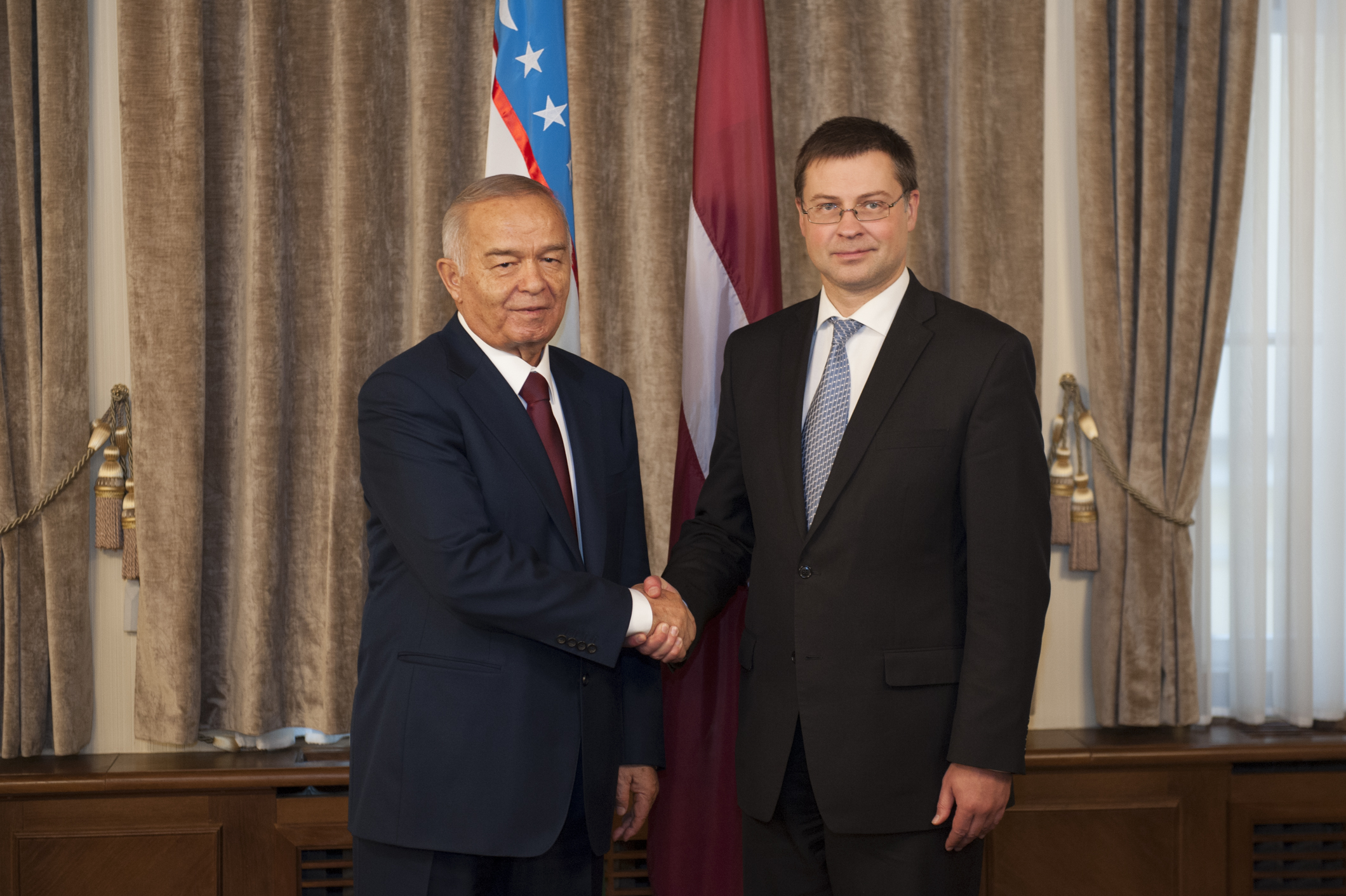
Meeting of the President of Uzbekistan Islam Karimov with the Prime Minister of Latvia Valdis Dombrovskis. Riga, October 17, 2013

== History ==
Uzbekistan is one of the main co-operation partners of Latvia in the Central Asian region. Along with the development of bilateral relations, Latvia, as an EU member state, supports closer relations of the EU with the countries of the Central Asian region, including the implementation of the EU Strategy for Central Asia.

Latvia and Uzbekistan traditionally have good political and economic relationship. The dialogue between the countries has been steadily evolving in recent years, and high level visits are regularly exchanged.

== High-level visits ==
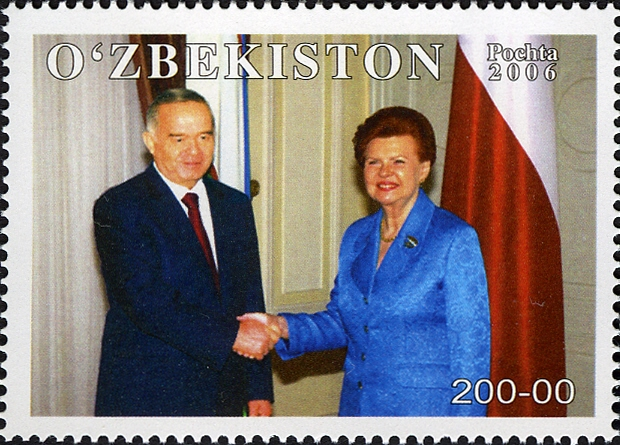
Latvian president Vaira Vīķe-Freiberga meets Islam Karimov.

High-level visits from Uzbekistan to Latvia

- President Islam Karimov (1995, 2004, 2013)

High-level visits from Latvia to Uzbekistan

- President Valdis Zatlers (2008)
- President Andris Bērziņš (2014)

== See also ==
- Foreign relations of Latvia
- Foreign relations of Uzbekistan
