= Sodiq Safoyev =

Uzbekistani politician and diplomat

- Содиқ Сафоев
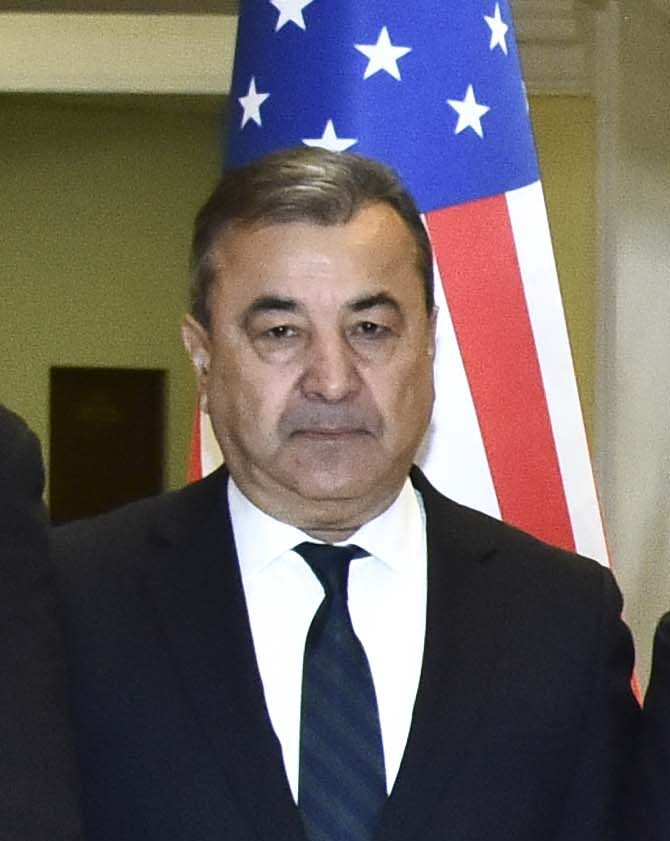
- Safoyev in 2018

First Deputy Chair of the Senate of Uzbekistan
- Incumbent
- Assumed office December 2016
- President: Shavkat Mirziyoyev
- Chairman: Nigmatilla Yuldashev; Tanzila Norbaeva

Senator of Uzbekistan
- Incumbent
- Assumed office 22 January 2015
- Appointed by: Shavkat Mirziyoyev

Minister of Foreign Affairs
- In office 14 March 2003 – 4 February 2005
- President: Islam Karimov
- Preceded by: Abdulaziz Komilov
- Succeeded by: Elyor Ganiyev

Personal details
- Born: 3 February 1954 (age 72) Tashkent, Uzbek SSR, Soviet Union

Sodiq Solihovich Safoyev (Uzbek Cyrillic: Содиқ Солиҳович Сафоев; Russian: Садык Салихович Сафаев, romanized: Sadyk Salikhovich Safayev), also known as Sodyq Safayev (born 3 February 1954), is an Uzbek politician, who served as First Deputy Chair of the Senate of Uzbekistan, former Minister of Foreign Affairs of Uzbekistan from 14 March 2003 to 4 February 2005.

== Early years ==
Safoyev was born on 3 February 1954 in Tashkent, Uzbek SSR, Soviet Union (now Uzbekistan). In 1976, he graduated from Tashkent State University with a degree in economics. After graduation, Safoyev went on to teach at the same university and was a senior professor until 1987. From 1987 until 1990, he worked as a supervisor at the Central Committee of Communist Party of Uzbekistan. From 1990 to 1991, he was a Senior Researcher at the Institute of Industrial Productivity Research of the Academy of Sciences of Republic of Uzbekistan while also an intern at Harvard University.

== Political career ==
In 1991, Safoyev was appointed Chief Consultant and Head of Department of International Economic Relations in Presidential Administration. From 1992 until 1993, he served as the First Deputy Minister of Foreign Economic Relations. From February 1993 until February 1994, he served as the Minister of Foreign Affairs of Uzbekistan (officially established as a ministry in February 1994). In 1993–1996, Safoyev served as Ambassador of Uzbekistan to Germany, also accredited for the Netherlands and Austria. In 1996, he worked as a State Advisor to the President of Uzbekistan and in from 1996 until 2001, served as the Ambassador of Uzbekistan to the United States, also accredited for Canada. After returning to Uzbekistan, in 2001-2003 Safoyev worked as the First Deputy Minister of Foreign Affairs, from 2002 to 2003 also the special representative of the President of Uzbekistan in Afghanistan. On 14 March 2003 Safoyev was appointed the Minister of Foreign Affairs, a post he held until 4 February 2005 when he was replaced by Elyor Ganiyev. He then became the rector of the University of World Economy and Diplomacy in Tashkent. As a rector of the university, he made many contributions to the development of ties of the university with institutions abroad and attraction of external funding. From 2005 to 2009, Safoyev chaired the Foreign Political Affairs Committee of Oliy Majlis Senate of Uzbekistan and was then re-appointed to the same post on 22 January 2010.

== Personal life ==
Safoyev was married and divorced in 2001. In 2003, while he was the foreign minister, allegations surfaced about his possible marriage to Gulnara Karimova, the daughter of the President of Uzbekistan Islam Karimov, and President Karimov's alleged plans for his replacement by Safoyev. Gulnara Karimova was also divorced with two children. However, the allegations were refuted and the marriage was denied by the Ministry of Foreign Affairs. The BBC, which published the story, was accused by then the First Deputy Minister Vladimir Norov of an intrusion into the personal lives of Safoyev and Karimova.

=== Awards ===
Sodiq Safoyev was awarded by order of Mekhnat Shukhrati in 2004 and memorial order of Uzbekiston Mustakilligiga 15 yil in 2006.
