= Oʻtkir Toʻxtamurodovich Sultonov =

Prime Minister of Uzbekistan (1995–2003)

Oʻtkir Sultonov
- Ўткир Султонов
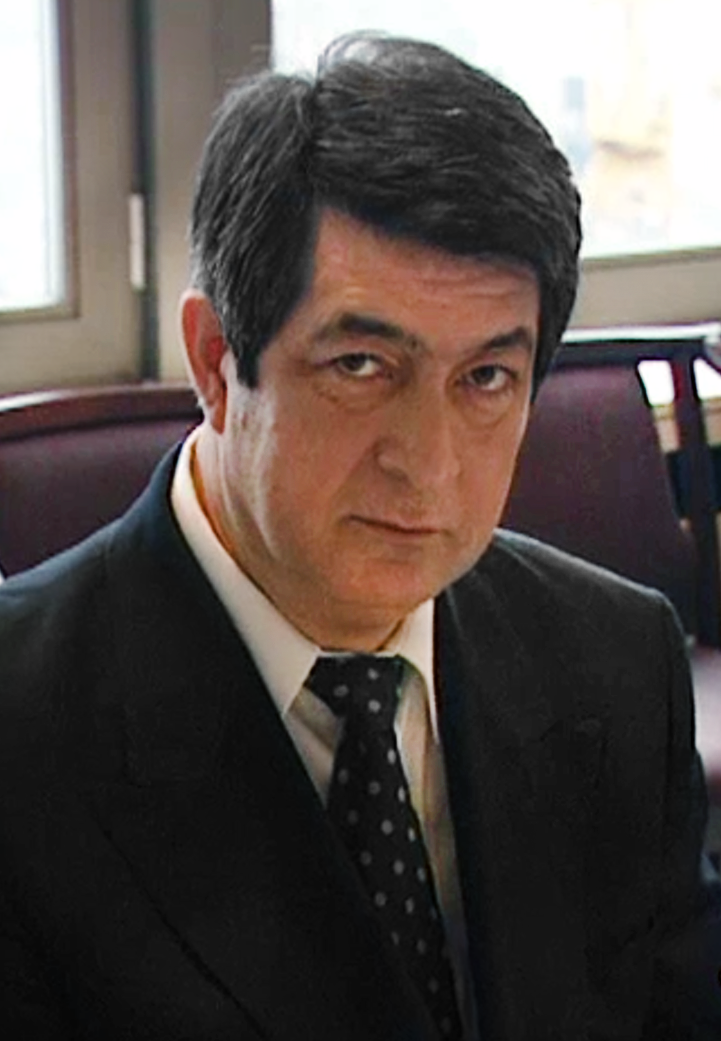
- Sultonov in 1995

2nd Prime Minister of Uzbekistan
- In office 21 December 1995 – 12 December 2003
- President: Islam Karimov
- Deputy: Abdulla Aripov
- Preceded by: Abdulhashim Mutalov
- Succeeded by: Shavkat Mirziyoyev

Personal details
- Born: 14 July 1939 Tashkent, Uzbek Soviet Socialist Republic
- Died: 29 November 2015 (aged 76) Tashkent, Uzbekistan
- Party: People's Democratic Party of Uzbekistan

Oʻtkir Toʻxtamurodovich Sultonov (14 July 1939 – 29 November 2015) was an Uzbek politician who served as the Prime Minister of Uzbekistan from 21 December 1995 until his dismissal on 12 December 2003.

== Cabinet included ==
- Abdulaziz Kamilov – foreign minister from 1994 until 2003
- Sodiq Safoyev – since March 2003

== See also ==
- List of current heads of state and government

Political offices
Preceded by Abdulhashim Mutalov	Prime Minister of Uzbekistan; 21 December 1995 – 11 December 2003	Succeeded by Shavkat Mirziyoyev
