= Azerbaijan–Uzbekistan relations =

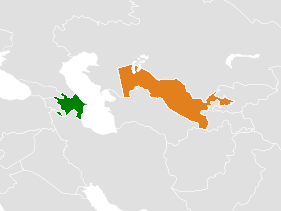

- Azerbaijan: Uzbekistan

Azerbaijan–Uzbekistan relations refer to the bilateral relations between Azerbaijan and Uzbekistan. Both countries were formally apart of the Soviet Union. Diplomatic ties were established on October 2, 1995. Azerbaijan has an embassy in Tashkent. Uzbekistan has an embassy in Baku.

Both nations are apart of the Organization of Turkic States, Economic Cooperation Organization, and Uzbekistan being a full member with Azerbaijan being an observer of Commonwealth of Independent States.

== History ==
Diplomatic relations between the two countries were established on October 2, 1995. In August 1996, the Azerbaijani Embassy was opened in Uzbekistan, and in July 1998, the Uzbekistani Embassy was opened in Azerbaijan.

On October 14, 2019, Uzbek President Shavkat Mirziyoyev, met with Azerbaijani President Ilham Aliyev in Azerbaijan.

Through June 21-22, 2022, Aliyev went to Tashkent, Khiva, and Urgench. While he was in Tashkent, he visited the Independence Monument, where he laid a wreath. He also visited Itchan Kala. While in Khiva he visited the Nurullaboy Palace Complex. The two nations also signed documents.

Through September 15-16, 2022, Aliyev visited Samarkand for the summit of the Shanghai Cooperation Organisation. Mirziyoyev called Aliyev a friend and brother. Both nations agreed to work on bilateral cooperation, with Aliyev inviting Mirziyoyev to Azerbaijan, which he accepted.

Through August 22-23, 2023, Mirziyoyev and his wife visited Baku. Both nations discussed relations with each other. Both nations also established the Supreme Interstate Council. Both Azerbaijani Minister of Economy, Mikayil Jabbarov, and Uzbek Minister of Investment, Industry and Trade, Laziz Kudratov, signed a "Protocol on cooperation between the State Service for Antimonopoly and Consumer Market Control under the Ministry of Economy of the Republic of Azerbaijan and Committee for Competition Promotion and Consumer Protection of the Republic of Uzbekistan." 8 other agreements were signed.

Through August 22-23, 2023, Aliyev visited Uzbekistan where both nations would sign the Treaty on Allied Relations.

Through July 2-4, Mirziyoyev visited Baku, where he talked with Aliyev about relations between both nations. He also attended the 17th summit of the Economic Cooperation Organization in Khankendi.

Through August 23-24, Aliyev and his wife visited Uzbekistan, where both nations signed the Treaty on Eternal Friendship. Projects and documents were also signed.

== Cultural relations ==
Azerbaijan and Uzbekistan maintain cultural exchanges in music, literature, cinema, and traditional arts, based on their shared Turkic cultural heritage and historical ties. The two countries signed an agreement on cooperation in the cultural and humanitarian spheres in 1996 and have pursued cooperation in culture and the arts, history, and the preservation of cultural heritage.

The two countries have expanded their exchanges through reciprocal cultural days. In 2023, cultural exchange events were held in both Uzbekistan and Azerbaijan. In 2024, the Days of Uzbek Science and Culture were held in Baku, while the Days of Azerbaijani Culture took place in Tashkent. In the same year, an Uzbek Cinema Days event was also held in Baku.

Cooperation has also taken place in music and the performing arts. In August 2024, a friendship concert featuring artists from both countries was held in Tashkent. Uzbek singer Farrukh Zokirov and Azerbaijani singer Polad Bülbüloğlu were each awarded the title of People's Artist of the other country.

In August 2024, the two countries signed a roadmap for cultural and humanitarian cooperation for 2024–2026. Under the roadmap, they agreed to expand cultural events and artistic exchanges and to pursue joint projects through international organizations such as UNESCO and the International Organization of Turkic Culture (TÜRKSOY).

== Trade ==
In 2024, Azerbaijan exported USD $45.7 million worth of good to Uzbekistan, and Uzbekistan exported USD $200 million worth of goods to Azerbaijan.

== High-level visits ==
High level visits from Azerbaijan to Uzbekistan

- Ilham Aliyev (June 21-22, 2022)
- Ilham Aliyev (September 15-16 2022)
- Ilham Aliyev (August 22-23, 2024)
- Ilham Aliyev (August 23-24, 2026)

High level visits from Uzbekistan to Azerbaijan

- Shavkat Mirziyoyev (October 14, 2019)
- Shavkat Mirziyoyev (August 22-23, 2023)
- Shavkat Mirziyoyev (July 2-4, 2025)

== Notable people ==
- Movlud Miraliyev
- Rafig Huseynov
- Maqsud Shayxzoda
- Nasiba Abdullaeva

== See also ==
- Foreign relations of Azerbaijan
- Foreign relations of Uzbekistan
- Azerbaijanis in Uzbekistan
