= Slovakia–Uzbekistan relations =

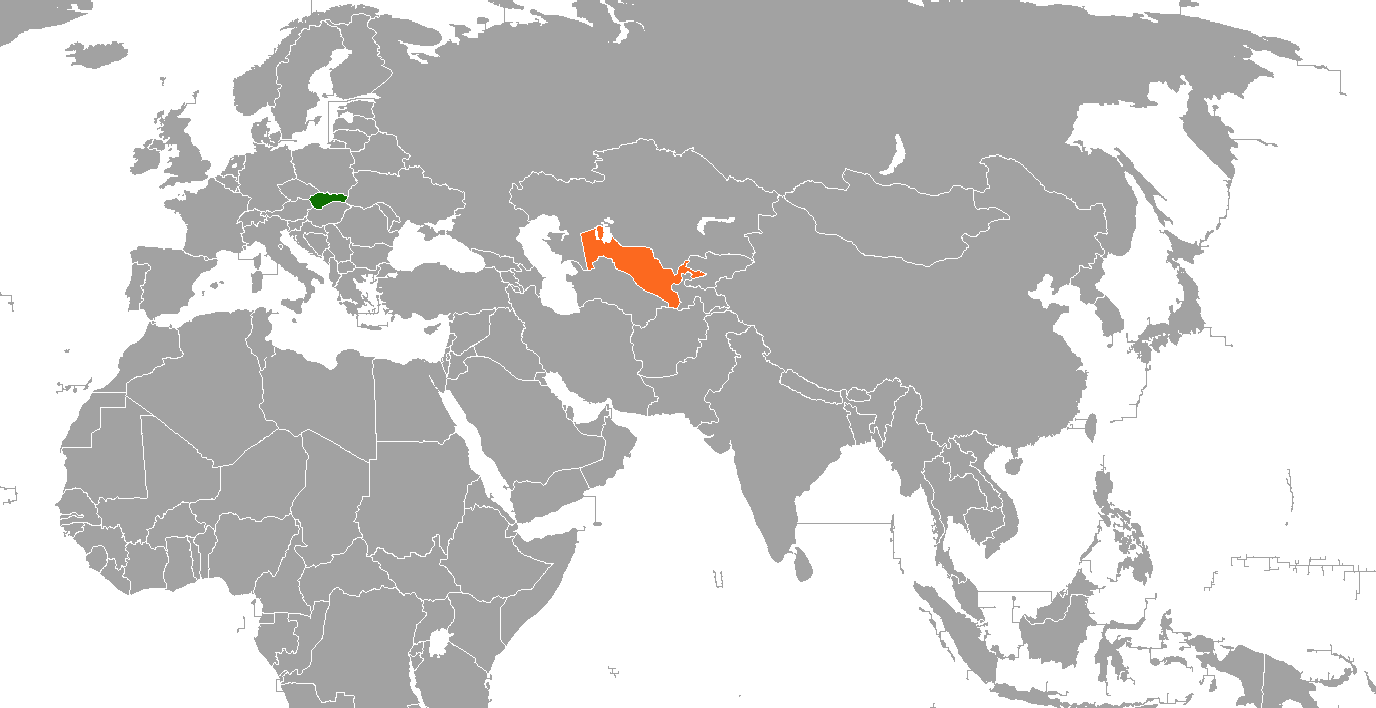

- Slovakia: Uzbekistan

Slovakia–Uzbekistan relations are the bilateral relations between Slovakia and Uzbekistan. Diplomatic relations between the two countries were established on January 1st, 1993. Slovakia has an embassy in Tashkent which is also accredited to Tajikistan and Turkmenistan. Uzbekistan uses its embassy in Vienna to cover Slovakia.

== History ==
Slovak prime minister, Robert Fico paid an official visit to Tashkent to meet with the president of Uzbekistan, Shavkat Mirziyoyev from June 8th, to June 10th, 2025. Both countries signed a strategic partnership, making Slovakia the 3rd to do so out of the European Union. Both countries signed an agreement on energy market regulation. After the talks, both countries held a ceremony to exchange bilateral agreements, in which both leaders attended. The ceremony went over cooperation on agriculture, standardization, metrology, goods, and energy market regulation. During the negotiations between Shavkat Mirziyoyev and Robert Fico both nations agreed for industrial cooperation. This includes Slovak companies for projects that focus on the agro-industrial complex, localization of auto components, production of pharmaceuticals, and other projects that include energy and tourism.

== High-level visits ==
High level visits from Slovakia to Uzbekistan

- Boris Kollár (April 2023)
- Prime minister Robert Fico (June 8-10, 2025)
- President Peter Pellegrini (October 29-31, 2025)

High level visits from Uzbekistan to Slovakia

== Resident diplomatic missions ==
- Slovakia has an embassy in Tashkent.
- Uzbekistan is accredited to Slovakia from its embassy in Vienna, Austria.

== See also ==
- Foreign relations of Slovakia
- Foreign relations of Uzbekistan
