= Hungary–Uzbekistan relations =

- Hungary: Uzbekistan

Hungary–Uzbekistan relations are the bilateral relations between Hungary and Uzbekistan. Hungary recognized the independence of Uzbekistan on 26 December 1991. After, the two countries established diplomatic relations on 3 March 1992. Hungary has an embassy in Tashkent, while Uzbekistan has an embassy in Budapest.

== History ==
In March 2021, Viktor Orbán visited Tashkent and signed a joint declaration on partnership.

In October 2022, Shavkat Mirziyoyev visited Budapest and signed multiple agreements, including agreements on mutual protection of investments, cooperation in the fields of science, innovation, agriculture, and water management.

In May 2025, Shavkat Mirziyoyev visited Budapest and held talks with prime minister Viktor Orbán where they upgraded ties between the two countries to an enhanced strategic partnership. The two countries also signed agreements on nuclear cooperation, climate protection, and disaster management.

== Trade ==
In 2024, trade between both countries exceeded $78,000,000 USD.

== High-level visits ==
High level-visits from Hungary to Uzbekistan

- Viktor Orbán (March 2021)

High level-visits from Uzbekistan to Hungary

- Shavkat Mirziyoyev (October 2022)
- Shavkat Mirziyoyev (May 2025)

== See also ==
- Foreign relations of Hungary
- Foreign relations of Uzbekistan
