= Ministry of Foreign Affairs (Uzbekistan) =

Government ministry of Uzbekistan

Ministry of Foreign Affairs of Uzbekistan
- O‘zbеkistоn Respublikasi Tаshqi ishlar vazirligi
- Emblem of Uzbekistan

Agency overview
- Formed: February 25, 1994
- Preceding agencies: Ministry of Foreign Affairs of the Soviet Union; Ministry of Foreign Affairs of the Uzbek SSR
- Jurisdiction: Government of Uzbekistan
- Headquarters: 9, Uzbekistan Street, Tashkent, 100029
- Agency executive: Baxtiyor Saidov, Ministry of Foreign Affairs
- Child agency: University of World Economy and Diplomacy
- Website: mfa.uz/en/

The Ministry of Foreign Affairs of Uzbekistan (Uzbek: O‘zbеkistоn Respublikasi Tаshqi ishlar vazirligi) is a Cabinet-level governmental agency in Uzbekistan in charge of conducting and designing the foreign policy of Uzbekistan.

== History and functions ==
The Ministry of Foreign Affairs of Uzbekistan was officially established on February 25, 1994 according to the decree of the President of Uzbekistan No. 769 and Resolution of the Cabinet of Ministers of Uzbekistan.

The ministry functions as an administrative body of state government and is a part of the Cabinet of Ministers of Uzbekistan, responsible for conducting the foreign policy of Uzbekistan based on the Constitution of Uzbekistan and international laws.

The activities of the ministry are supervised directly by the President of Uzbekistan.

Uzbekistan has a university, named the UWED (the University of World Economy and Diplomacy), which focuses on socioeconomic and diplomatic studies and maintains strong partnership with Azerbaijan, Belgium, China, France, Germany, Hungary, Italy, Japan, Kazakhstan, South Korea, Lithuania, Poland, Russia, Spain, Switzerland, Tajikistan, Turkey, Turkmenistan, Ukraine, the United Kingdom and the United States. The university serves students from Azerbaijan, Belgium, China, France, Germany, Hungary, Italy, Japan, Kazakhstan, South Korea, Lithuania, Poland, Russia, Spain, Switzerland, Tajikistan, Turkey, Turkmenistan, Ukraine, the United Kingdom and the United States and assists them with the socioeconomic and diplomatic studies of the type of countries.

== Structure ==
The ministry is headed by the Minister of Foreign Affairs of Uzbekistan, currently Baxtiyor Saidov. His First Deputy is Abdulaziz Kamilov who was the first foreign minister since the establishment of the ministry. Other deputies are Rustam Tukhtabaev, Abdurahim Khodjaev, Anvar Solihbaev, Bahtiyar Islamov.

The ministry is divided into several departments:

- Department for Europe
- Department for the USA and Americas
- Department for the United Nations and International Organizations
- Legal Department
- Department for the Middle and the Near East
- Department for the Asia and the Pacific
- Department for the CIS and Russia
- Department for the CIS, CSTO and SCO structures
- State Protocol Department
- Personnel and Educational Institutions Department
- Head Department for Foreign Policy Analysis and Strategy
- Department for Communication, Computer Systems and Internet
- Consular Department
- Finance Department
- Accounts Department
- Press Secretary and Press Service
- Department for Administrative Affairs

== List of ministers ==
represents tenure as Acting Minister

| No. | Portrait | Name (Lifespan) | Tenure | | | President |
| No. | Portrait | Name (Lifespan) | From | To | Term | President |
|---|---|---|---|---|---|---|
| 1 | | Shahlo Mahmudova (born 1944) | 16 September 1991 | 6 November 1992 | 1 year, 51 days | Islam Karimov (1 Sep. 1991 – 2 Sep. 2016) |
| 2 | | Ubaydulla Abdurazzoqov (1932–2014) | 7 November 1992 | 2 February 1993 | 87 days | Islam Karimov (1 Sep. 1991 – 2 Sep. 2016) |
| 3 | | Sodiq Safoyev (born 1954) | 3 February 1993 | 25 February 1994 | 1 year, 22 days | Islam Karimov (1 Sep. 1991 – 2 Sep. 2016) |
| 4 | | Abdulaziz Kamilov (born 1947) | 25 February 1994 | 14 March 2003 | 9 years, 17 days | Islam Karimov (1 Sep. 1991 – 2 Sep. 2016) |
| (3) | | Sodiq Safoyev (born 1954) | 14 March 2003 | 4 February 2005 | 1 year, 327 days | Islam Karimov (1 Sep. 1991 – 2 Sep. 2016) |
| 5 | | Elyor Ganiyev (born 1960) | 4 February 2005 | 12 July 2006 | 1 year, 158 days | Islam Karimov (1 Sep. 1991 – 2 Sep. 2016) |
| 6 | | Vladimir Norov (born 1955) | 12 July 2006 | 28 December 2010 | 4 years, 169 days | Islam Karimov (1 Sep. 1991 – 2 Sep. 2016) |
| (5) | | Elyor Ganiyev (born 1960) | 28 December 2010 | 13 January 2012 | 1 year, 16 days | Islam Karimov (1 Sep. 1991 – 2 Sep. 2016) |
| (4) | | Abdulaziz Kamilov (born 1947) | 13 January 2012 | September; 2012 | 10 years, 104 days | Islam Karimov (1 Sep. 1991 – 2 Sep. 2016) |
| (4) | | Abdulaziz Kamilov (born 1947) | September; 2012 | 27 April 2022 | 10 years, 104 days | Shavkat Mirziyoyev (8 Sep. 2016 – present) |
| (6) | | Vladimir Norov (born 1955) | 27 April 2022 | 30 December 2022 | 247 days | Shavkat Mirziyoyev (8 Sep. 2016 – present) |
| – | | Bakhtiyor Saidov (born 1981) | 30 December 2022 | 23 April 2023 | 3 years, 304 days | Shavkat Mirziyoyev (8 Sep. 2016 – present) |
| 7 | | Bakhtiyor Saidov (born 1981) | 23 April 2023 | Incumbent | 3 years, 304 days | Shavkat Mirziyoyev (8 Sep. 2016 – present) |

== See also ==
- Foreign relations of Uzbekistan
- Government of Uzbekistan
