= Vladimir Norov =

Uzbekistani politician and diplomat (born 1955)

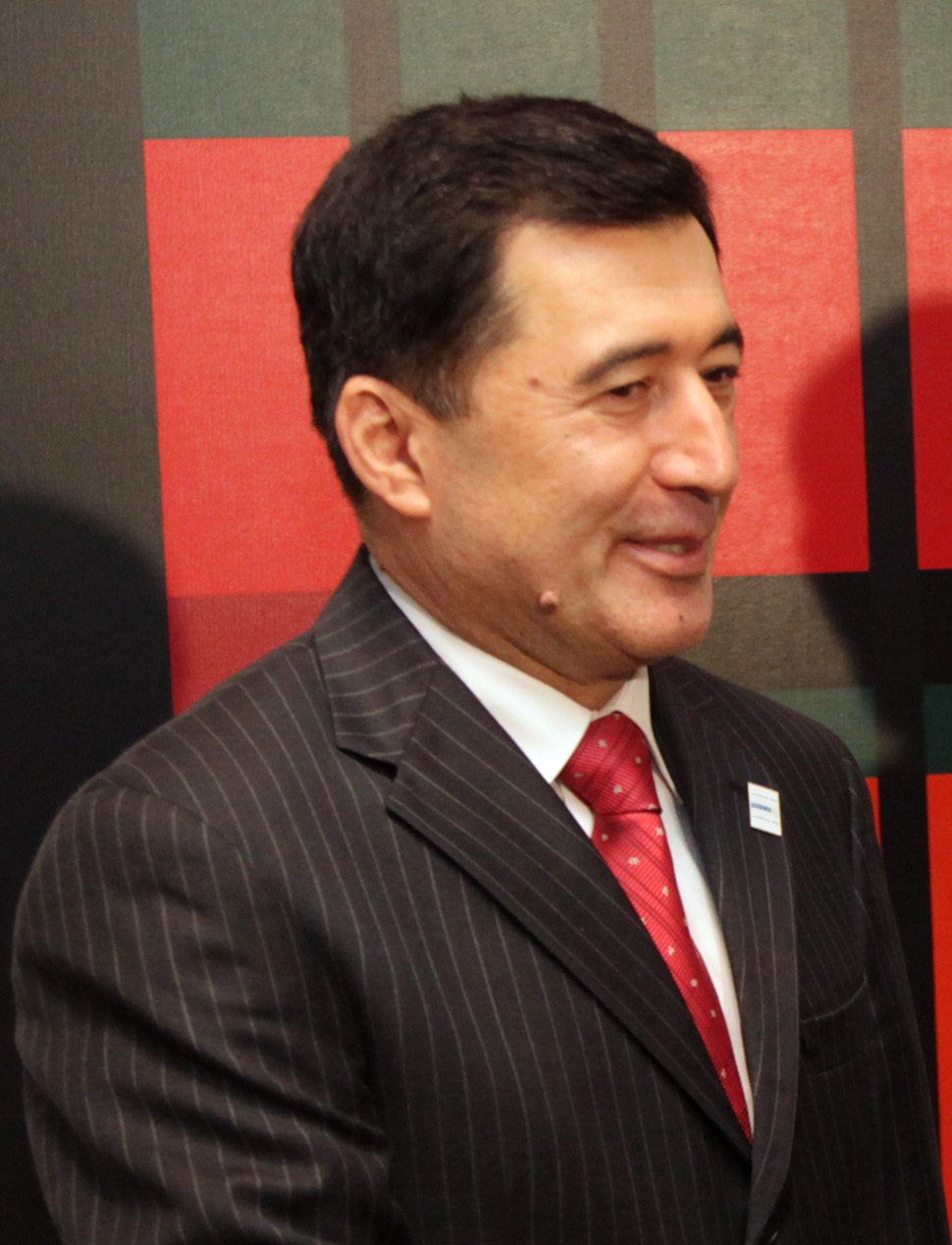

Minister of Foreign Affairs of Uzbekistan
- In office 27 April 2022 – 30 December 2022
- President: Shavkat Mirziyoyev
- Preceded by: Abdulaziz Kamilov
- Succeeded by: Baxtiyor Saidov
- In office 12 July 2006 – 28 December 2010
- President: Islam Karimov
- Preceded by: Elyor Ganiyev
- Succeeded by: Elyor Ganiyev

Secretary-General of the Shanghai Cooperation Organisation
- In office 1 January 2019 – 31 December 2021
- Preceded by: Rashid Alimov
- Succeeded by: Zhang Ming

Personal details
- Born: Владимир Имамович Норов; 31 August 1955 (age 71) Bukhara, Uzbek SSR, Soviet Union
- Education: Internal Affairs Academy

Vladimir Imamovich Norov (born 31 August 1955) is an Uzbek politician who served as Minister of Foreign Affairs of Uzbekistan from 2006 to 2010 and again from 27 April to 30 December 2022 and Former Secretary-General of the Shanghai Cooperation Organisation from 2019 to 2021.

== Early years ==
Norov was born on 31 August 1955, in the city of Bukhara, in southern Uzbekistan. From 1972 to 1976, he studied at and graduated from the Mathematics Department of the Bukhara Pedagogical Institute. He then served in the Soviet Army from 1976 till 1977. From 1978 to 1983, Norov worked in the Ministry of Internal Affairs in Uzbek SSR and from 1983 to 1985, he studied at and graduated from the Internal Affairs Ministry Academy in Moscow. Then, he continued working for the MIA and in 1988–1990 was a student of the adjunct courses at the Interior Ministry Academy followed by two more years of employment at the MIA.

== Political career ==
From 1993 through 1995, Norov was the consultant on administrative and legal issues of the Office of the President of the Republic of Uzbekistan. In 1995–1996, he served as the first deputy of the minister of foreign affairs of Uzbekistan and in 1996–1998 was the state advisor to the president on intergovernmental relations and foreign economic relations. In 1998, he was appointed Ambassador of Uzbekistan to Germany, which he held until 2003. From 2002, he also assumed ambassador's duties to Switzerland and Poland while in Berlin. From 2003 until 2005, he was the first deputy minister of foreign affairs. On 29 December 2004, he was appointed ambassador to Belgium and returned to Uzbekistan in mid-2006. He was appointed Minister of Foreign Affairs of Uzbekistan on 12 July 2006. He also served as ambassador to the Netherlands and Luxembourg.

Norov has the rank of ambassador extraordinary and plenipotentiary. He was awarded Uzbek national award Mekhnat Shukhrati.

He speaks English, Russian and German, and is married with three children.

== Other positions ==
On 30 December 2022, Shavkat Mirziyoyev signed an order appointing Vladimir Norov to the post of director of the International Institute of Central Asia (MICA).

== Awards and honors ==
- Badge of the Ministry of Foreign Affairs of Russia "For Contribution to International Cooperation" (2022, Russia)
- Order "Galkynyş" (2022, Turkmenistan)
- Order "Mehnat shuhrati" (2003, Uzbekistan)
