= Italy–Uzbekistan relations =

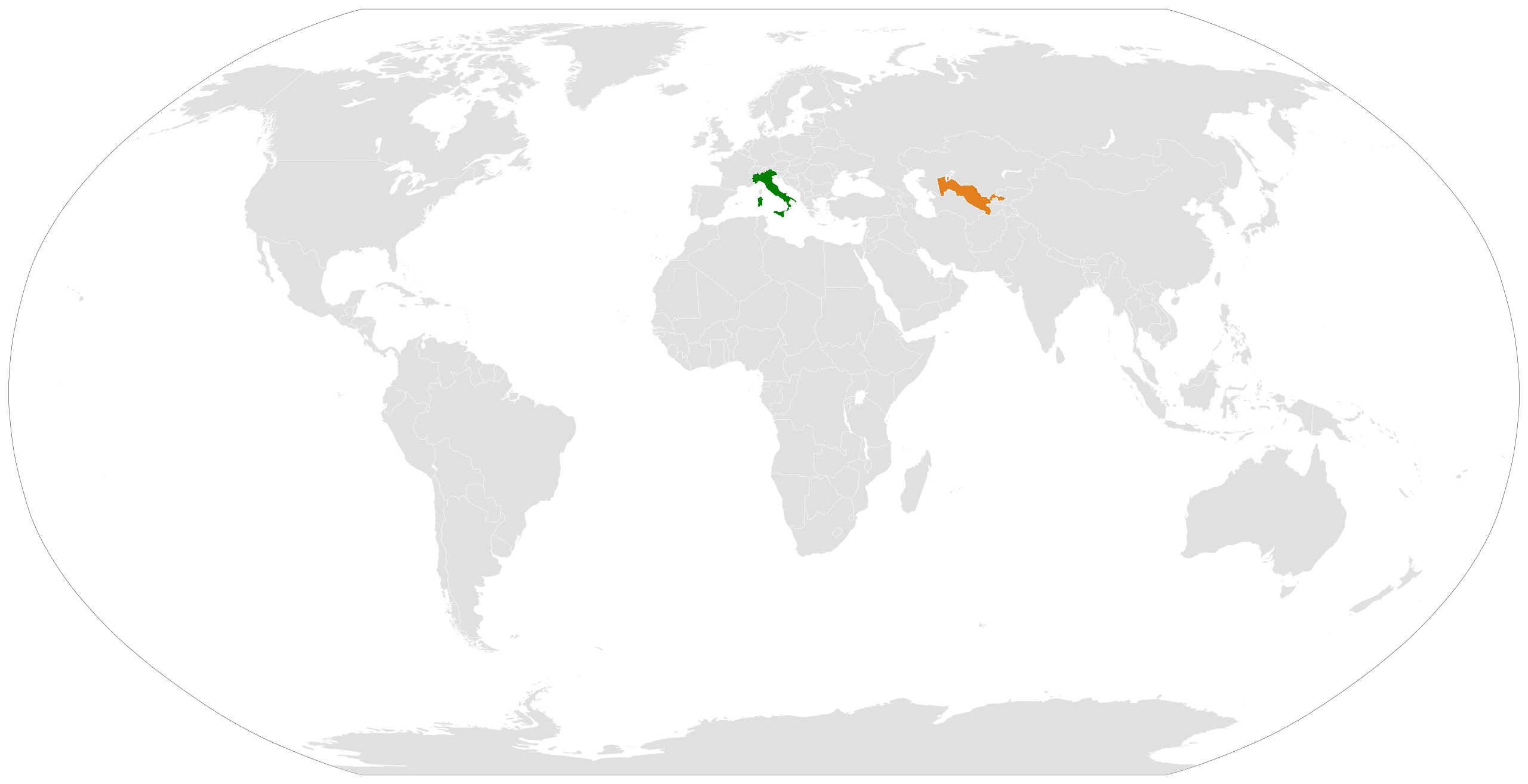

- Italy: Uzbekistan

Italy–Uzbekistan relations refer to bilateral relations between Italy and Uzbekistan. The two countries established diplomatic relations in March 1992, after Uzbekistan gained independence from the Soviet Union. Italy has an embassy in Tashkent, while Uzbekistan has an embassy in Rome.

== History ==
There had been historical links between the Italy-based Roman Empire to Transoxiana as the Romans were aiming to find way to reach China via extensive trading interests, for which it served as the basis for the ancient Silk Road, when goods from Transoxiana, Khwarazm and Khorasan were sold in Rome and vice versa.

Marco Polo, the Italian traveller from the Republic of Venice, used the Silk Road to reach Yuan China; during his travel, he also visited the Chagatai Khanate that located in modern-day Uzbekistan; these experiences also consolidated the strong presences of merchants from what would be Italy in Central Asia. These links did not dissipate after the foundation of the Timurid Empire by the feared conqueror Timur, which Italians (also mostly from Venice) also made their presences in the Timurid Court; and for once, the Timurid Renaissance was often compared to the Renaissance in Europe, fostering indirect engagement in cultures and arts (often via the Ottoman Empire).

With the fall of the Timurid Empire and the establishment of the Uzbek-led Khanate of Bukhara, originally a Kipchak entity of the Shaybanids that would undergo Timuridisation to become a Karluk Timurid entity, connection between Italian entities and the Transoxianan states weakened, though they still preserved ties to some length, with Italian Jesuits sometimes crossed Central Asia to come to serve in the Ming and Qing courts; nonetheless, Italian Jesuits still played a pivotal role in mapping Central Asia to European knowledge.

At the 17th century, the India-based Mughal Empire, established by Babur from the same Timurid dynasty, also employed several foreigners in the court. One of the witnesses was Niccolao Manucci, who mistook the Timurid court of India as "Uzbek", albeit it coincided with the heavy assimilation of the Kipchak Shaybanids and Janids into the Karluk-Chagataid cultural realm in Transoxiana.

== Modern history ==
Based on this ancient tie, Italy and Uzbekistan have strong interests in promoting their relations.

In 2023, Uzbekistani President Shavkat Mirziyoyev became the first Uzbek President to visit Italy, a major milestone in the relationship between two countries; this visit also marked the establishment of a friendship and cooperation group between Italy and Uzbekistan.

In May 2025, Italian Prime Minister Giorgia Meloni became the first Italian PM to visit Uzbekistan, as Italy aimed to break away from their reactive and slow motion role to become a more proactive player. This was highlighted by the growing trade between two countries, especially since Shavkat Mirziyoyev's liberalisation of Uzbek economy in 2017, with the volume of mutual trade increased from US$172.2 million in 2017 to nearly US$438 million in 2024.
