= Lithuania–Uzbekistan relations =

- Lithuania: Uzbekistan

Lithuania–Uzbekistan relations refer to the bilateral relations between Lithuania and Uzbekistan. Diplomatic ties were established on August 5, 1992. Lithuania is accredited to Uzbekistan though its embassy in Astana. Uzbekistan is accredited to Lithuania through its embassy in Riga. Both countries were formerly part of the Soviet Union. Uzbekistan recognized the independence of Lithuania on September 30, 1991. Both nations are apart of OSCE.

== History ==
On July 10, 2023, the Ministry of Culture and Tourism of Uzbekistan formalized tourism and cultural exchanges between the two nations, Lithuania government representatives helped with this. Lithuanians are interested in Uzbekistan.

On July 11, 2025, in Vilnius, the two nations signed a memorandum of understanding, which includes cooperation of the two nations between combating and preventing corruption, training programs between the two, and for European practices to take place in Uzbekistan.

From August 18–22, 2025, a study tour was held in Vilnius, by an Uzbek health and finance delegation consisting of 15 members, which studied the universal health insurance of Lithuania.

In April 2026, Tadas Valys, Deputy Minister of Foreign Affairs of Lithuania travelled to Tashkent for the third round of the Third EU–Central Asia Economic Forum, and met with Uzbek Deputy Minister of Investments, Industry, and Trade, Akram Aliev, they both discussed trade expansion.

== Trade ==
In 2024, Lithuania exported USD $119 million worth of packaged medicaments to Uzbekistan.

In the same year, Uzbekistan exported USD $97 million worth of planes and helicopters to Lithuania.

== Resident diplomatic missions ==
- Lithuania is accredited to Uzbekistan from its embassy in Astana, Kazakhstan.
- Uzbekistan is accredited to Lithuania from its embassy in Riga, Latvia.

== See also ==
- Foreign relations of Lithuania
- Foreign relations of Uzbekistan
