= Muhammadbobur Malikov =

Muhammadbobur Majidovich Malikov is an uzbek lawyer and diplomat. Minister of Justice of Uzbekistan (1991-1993), Ambassador of Uzbekistan to the USA (in 1993).

== Biography ==
Born in Margilan. Grandson of Yuldash Akhunbabaev. From 1949 to 1957, lived in one of the villages of Fergana region. His father was the chairman of a collective farm.

In 1967, he graduated from the aviation technical school, majoring in mechanical engineering. He worked as a plumber in the 34th workshop of the Tashkent Aviation Production Union named after Chkalov.

In 1972, graduated from the Faculty of Law of Tashkent State University. From 1972 to 1977, Malikov worked in the prosecutor's office. Worked in the judicial system since 1977. In 1983, he was elected a member of the Tashkent Regional Court, and in 1985, he was elected as a member of the Supreme Court. From 1987 to 1989 was the Chairman of Andijan Regional court.

In 1989, he was elected chairman of the Supreme Court of the USSR and at the same time was a member of the Supreme Court of the USSR. He initiated the retrial of those convicted of the "Cotton Case" and acquitted more than 3,500 farmers. In 1989, at the plenum of the Supreme Court of the Soviet Union, he was the first to speak out against the investigative team of Gdlyan and Ivanov, calling their actions "genocide of the Uzbek people". In 1991, he was appointed as the Minister of Justice of the Republic of Uzbekistan.

From February 19 to November 20, 1993, Malikov was the ambassador of the Republic of Uzbekistan to the United States. He opposed Islam Karimov's policy. He asked for political asylum in the USA and accused Karimov's regime of "fascism". Currently, he is the leader of the "Civil Movement of Uzbekistan".
