= Estonia–Uzbekistan relations =

- Estonia: Uzbekistan

Envoy
- Estonian Ambassador to Uzbekistan Jaap Ora: Uzbek Ambassador to Estonia Timur Rahmanov

Estonia–Uzbekistan relations refer to the bilateral relations between Estonia and Uzbekistan. Diplomatic relations were established on October 10th, 1994, after they both gained independence from the Soviet Union. Estonia is accredited to Uzbekistan through its embassy in Astana. Uzbekistan is accredited to Estonia through its embassy in Riga.

== History ==
In March 2023, ambassador Toomas Tirs visited Uzbekistan where the two countries discussed cooperation in transport and logistics.

In May 2024, an organized meetup supported by UNDP in Uzbekistan visited Estonia to study startups and digitalization of businesses.

On March 13th, 2026, both countries held an online meeting in Tallinn. The two nations discussed cooperation and strengthening their bilateral relations with one another. During this meeting, Aivar Kokk noted that, "Estonia views Uzbekistan as an important and promising partner in Central Asia and attaches great significance to expanding mutually beneficial cooperation."

== High-level visits ==
High level visits from Estonia to Uzbekistan

- Taavi Aas (May 2019)
- Marge Mardisalu-Kahari (February 2023)
- Toomas Tirs (March 26-30, 2023)
- Jonatan Vseviov (November 2023)

High level visits from Uzbekistan to Estonia

== See Also ==
- Foreign relations of Estonia
- Foreign relations of Uzbekistan
