= Sweden–Uzbekistan relations =

- Sweden: Uzbekistan

Sweden–Uzbekistan relations refer to the bilateral relations between Sweden and Uzbekistan. Sweden recognized the independence of Uzbekistan on January 16th, 1992. Diplomatic ties between the two nations were created on April 8th, 1992. Sweden is accredited to Uzbekistan through its embassy in Moscow. Uzbekistan has an embassy in Stockholm.

== History ==
In October 2024, Uzbek Chairman of the Committee on Industry, Construction, and Trade of the Legislative Chamber of Oliy Majlis, Nodir Jumayev, visited Sweden from October 14-15th. The two nations discussed bilateral cooperation.

In October 2025, Uzbek Deputy Foreign Minister, Olimjon Abdullaev, travelled to Stockholm and met with Swedish Minister for Foreign Trade and International Cooperation, Benjamin Dousa, where the two nations discussed bilateral relations as well as expanding trade and economic cooperation.

In February 2026, in Tashkent the fourth round of political consultations took place between Olimjon Abdullaev and Torbjörn Solström. In the consultation, bilateral relations were discussed between political, trade and economic, cultural cooperation.

In June 2026, the two nations signed a partnership on migration, labor mobility, and academic exchange.

== High-level visits ==
High level visits from Sweden to Uzbekistan

High level visits from Uzbekistan to Sweden

- Nodir Jumayev (October 14-15, 2024)
- Olimjon Abdullaev (October 2025)

== See Also ==
- Foreign relations of Sweden
- Foreign relations of Uzbekistan
- List of ambassadors of Sweden to Uzbekistan
