= Abdulaziz Kamilov =

Uzbek politician

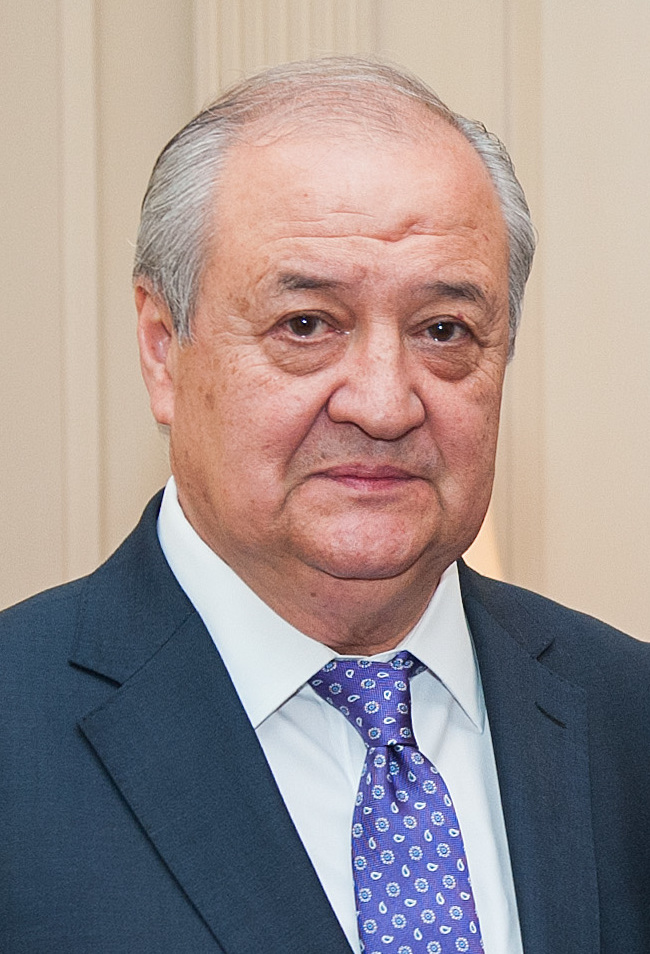
- Kamilov in 2018

Special Representative of the President of Uzbekistan for Foreign Affairs
- Incumbent
- Assumed office 27 April 2022
- President: Shavkat Mirziyoyev

Minister of Foreign Affairs
- In office 11 February 2012 – 27 April 2022
- President: Islam Karimov; Shavkat Mirziyoyev
- Preceded by: Elyor Ganiyev
- Succeeded by: Vladimir Norov
- In office 25 February 1994 – 14 March 2003
- President: Islam Karimov
- Preceded by: Sodiq Safoyev
- Succeeded by: Sodiq Safoyev

Deputy Minister of Foreign Affairs of Uzbekistan
- In office 11 February 2008 – 11 February 2012
- President: Islam Karimov
- Preceded by: Elyor Ganiyev
- Succeeded by: Elyor Ganiyev

Personal details
- Born: November 16, 1947 (age 78) Yangiyo'l, Uzbek SSR, USSR

Abdulaziz Khafizovich Kamilov (Uzbek: Abdulaziz Xafizovich Kamilov; Russian: Абдулазиз Хафизович Камилов, Abdulaziz Khafizovich Kamilov; born November 16, 1947) is an Uzbek politician who was Uzbekistan's Minister of Foreign Affairs from 2012 to 2022. Previously he served in the same post from 1994 to 2003.

== Early life and education ==
Kamilov was born on November 16, 1947, in Yangiyo'l, Uzbekistan. He graduated from the Diplomatic Academy of the Ministry of Foreign Affairs of the Soviet Union. From 1978 through 1980, he was a post-graduate student at the Eastern Studies department of the Academy of Sciences of the USSR. He has a PhD in history.

== Early career ==
Kamilov worked as an attaché of the Soviet Embassy in Lebanon from 1973 until 1976. In 1980–1984, he worked as the second secretary of the Soviet Embassy in Syria and in 1984–1988 in the Department of Middle Eastern Affairs of the Ministry of Foreign Affairs of the Uzbek SSR. In 1988–1991, he worked at the Department of World Economy and Foreign Affairs of the Academy of Science of the USSR. In 1991–1992, he was advisor to the Embassy of Uzbekistan in Russia.

== Uzbek Foreign Service ==
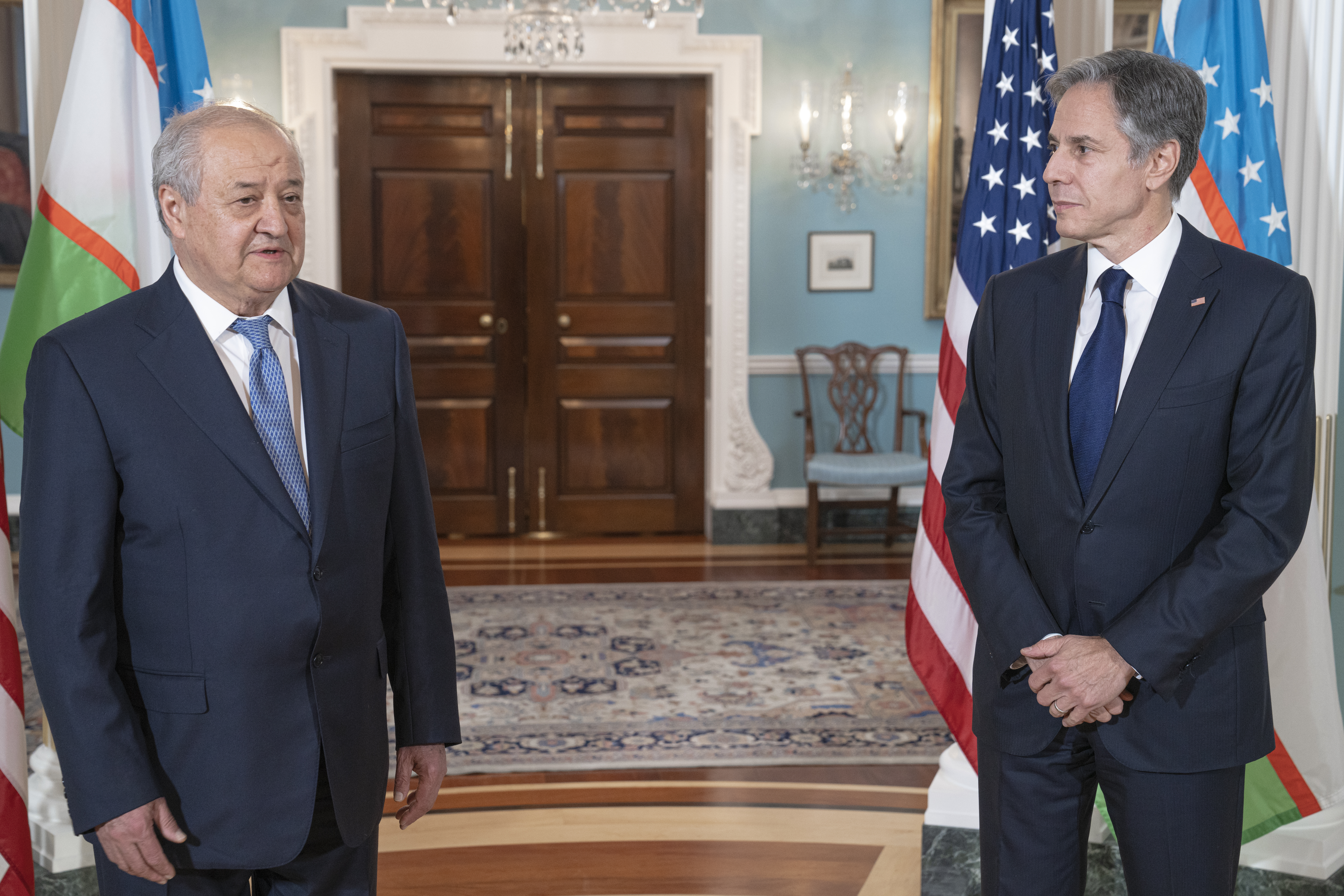
Kamilov meets with U.S. Secretary of State Antony J. Blinken at the U.S. Department of State in Washington, D.C., on July 1, 2021.

From 1992 until 1994, Kamilov served as the Deputy Minister of National Security, and in 1994, he was appointed as Minister of Foreign Affairs of Uzbekistan. At the same time, from 1998 until 2003, he was the rector of University of World Economy and Diplomacy. He remained in the post of Foreign Minister until March 14, 2003, when he was replaced by Sodiq Safoyev, a few months before the government of Prime Minister O'tkir Sultonov resigned. He was then appointed as National Foreign Affairs Advisor to the President of Uzbekistan.

He was subsequently appointed as the Ambassador of Uzbekistan to the United States and Canada with residence in Washington, D.C., on December 4, 2003. In 2008, while in Washington, he also assumed the duties of ambassador to Brazil. In 2010, Kamilov was appointed as First Deputy Minister of Foreign Affairs, and he returned to the post of Minister of Foreign Affairs in 2012.

In April 2022, he was appointed Deputy Secretary of the Security Council for Foreign Policy and Security and on 16 June same year, he was appointed Special Representative of the President of Uzbekistan for Foreign Affairs.

== Awards ==
Kamilov has the rank of Ambassador Extraordinary and Plenipotentiary. He was awarded Uzbek national awards of Mekhnat Shukhrati and Uzbekiston belgisi.

=== Foreign honours ===
- Turkmenistan: Order "Galkynyş" (2022)
- Japan: Grand Cordon of the Order of the Rising Sun (2023)

== Personal life ==
Komilov is fluent in Arabic, English and Russian. He is married and has a son. His wife Gulnara Kamilova (née Rashidova) was the daughter of a Soviet party and statesman Sharof Rashidov. His son Daniyar is a businessman and a Russian citizen.

== See also ==
- List of foreign ministers in 2017
- List of current foreign ministers
