= Abdulhashim Mutalov =

Uzbekistani politician

- Абдулҳошим Муталов
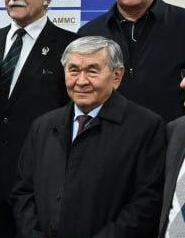
- Mutalov in 2026

Prime Minister of Uzbekistan
- In office 8 January 1992 – 21 December 1995
- President: Islam Karimov
- Preceded by: Office established
- Succeeded by: Utkir Sultonov

Personal details
- Born: 27 April 1947 (age 78) Telyau, Ohangaron District, Tashkent Region, Uzbek SSR, Soviet Union

Abdulhashim Mutalovich Mutalov (born 27 April 1947) is an Uzbek politician who served as the first Prime Minister of Uzbekistan from January 1992 to December 1995.

Political offices
Preceded by Shukrullo Mirsaidov	Prime Minister of Uzbekistan; 1992–1995	Succeeded by Oʻtkir Sultonov
