= Bakhtiyor Saidov =

Uzbek diplomat and politician (born 1981)

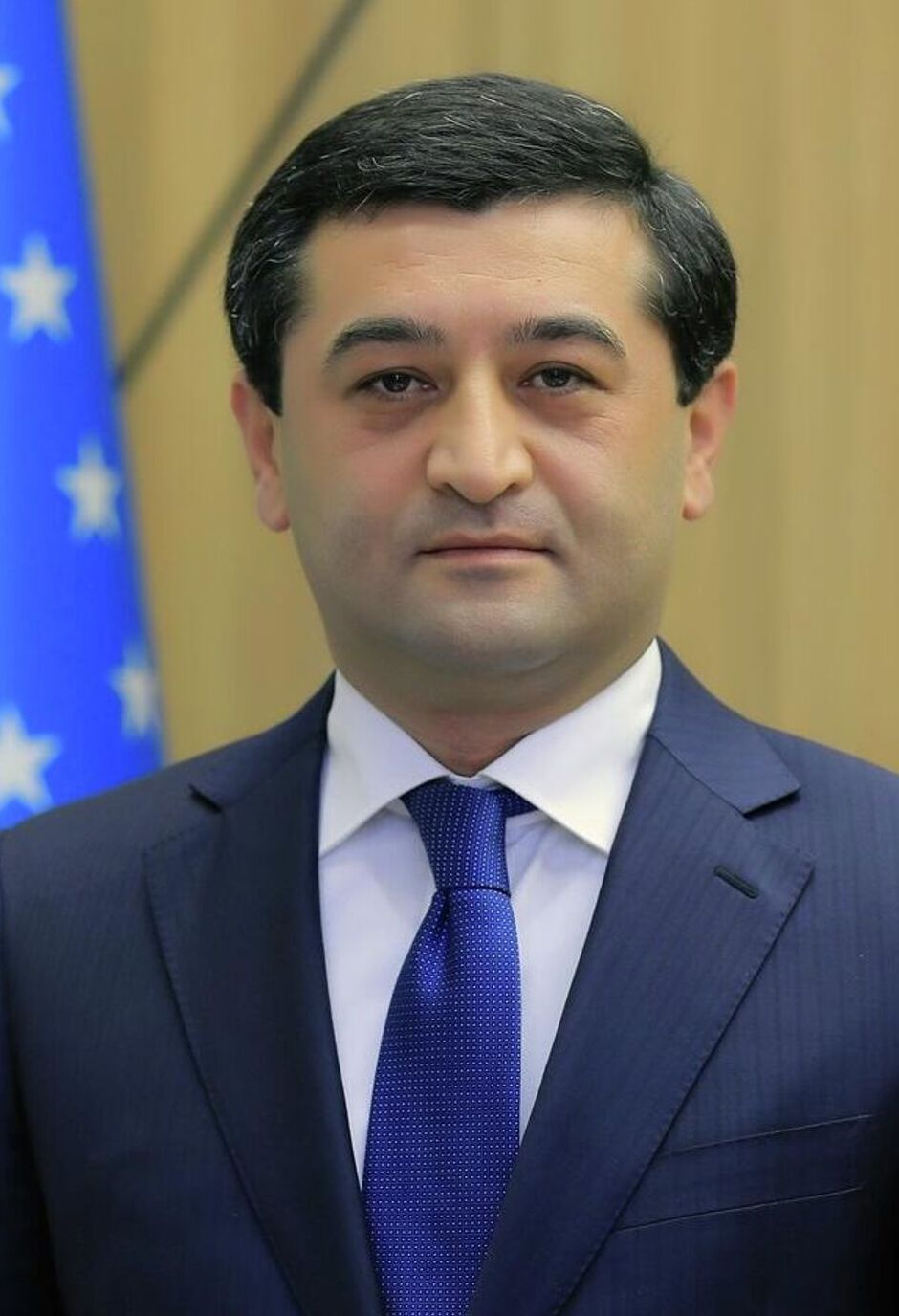

Minister of Foreign Affairs
- Incumbent
- Assumed office 30 December 2022
- President: Shavkat Mirziyoyev
- Preceded by: Vladimir Norov

Personal details
- Born: 22 April 1981 (age 45) Samarkand, Uzbek SSR, USSR
- Education: Tashkent State University of Economics

Bakhtiyor Odilovich Saidov (born 22 April 1981) is an Uzbek diplomat and politician serving as minister of foreign affairs since 2022. He served as minister of public education from 2021 to 2022, and previously served as ambassador to China, Mongolia and the Philippines.

== Biography ==
In 2002, he graduated from the Tashkent State University of Economics, and in 2007, from the World Trade Institute. Saidov began his career in 2002 as an intern at the Ministry of Foreign Affairs.

From 2003 to 2008, he held senior positions at the State Joint Stock Company "Urta Osiyo Trans", the Uzinfoinvest Agency and various other departments of the Ministry of Foreign Economic Relations, Investments and Trade of the Republic of Uzbekistan.

From 2009 to 2013, he worked as an adviser on trade and economic issues at the Embassy of the Republic of Uzbekistan in South Korea, making a significant contribution to the development of economic relations between Uzbekistan and South Korea.

From 2013 to 2015, he worked as the head of the department for examination and monitoring of international treaties of the Cabinet of Ministers of the Republic of Uzbekistan. From 2015 to 2017, he worked as the First Deputy Chairman and General Manager of JSC Uzbekyengilsanoat. In July 2017, he was made Ambassador to the People's Republic of China, and concurrently to Mongolia and the Philippines, with residence in Beijing.

From November 17, 2021 to December 30, 2022, he was Minister of Public Education. On December 30, 2022, he was appointed to the post of Acting Minister of Foreign Affairs of Uzbekistan, replacing Vladimir Norov. On April 25, 2023, he was approved as Minister of Foreign Affairs.

== Awards ==
- Order of Friendship (2018)
- Honorary Professor of Jiangxi University (China).
- SCO Council of Defense Ministers Badge (2020)
