= Television in Uzbekistan =

Television in Uzbekistan was introduced in 1956 when Uzbekistan was part of the Soviet Union. The first national television channel was Oʻzbekiston, which originally broadcast in black and white; colour television being introduced in the 1970s. At its launch, Oʻzbekiston was the only TV channel, and it broadcast several times a day. Uzbekistan's first private television channel, STV, started broadcasting on 15 May 1991.

In 2005, there were 30–40 independent television stations in operation. However, four state-owned television stations, run by the Television and Radio Company of Uzbekistan, dominated the market. No live programming was allowed.

== History ==
Television broadcasting in the Uzbek SSR began on 5 November 1956. A new studio complex which had one broadcasting and one mock-up studio was built. By 1964, television had been introduced to Karakalpakstan.

Folloing the independence of Uzbekistan the National Television and Radio Company of Uzbekistan (NTRC) was created. It operated three channels: UzTV-1, UzTV-2 (with programmes from the Toshkent studio) and UzTV-3 (which was divided between ORT relays and Omad). The first private TV station, STV, began broadcasting in Samarkand on 15 May 1991, months before independence. Around 1994–95, the station acquired the rights to air TV-6 Moscow. In 1998, UzTV-2 was reformatted as Yoshlar and the Toshkent studio moved to UzTV-4, later renamed to TTV and now known as Toshkent.

In 2004, several independent TV stations created NTT, the Network of Independent Television Companies. This was followed by TV Markaz, SofTS and Forum TV, all of which had links to Gulnara Karimova.

Uzbekistan became the first country in the Commonwealth of Independent States to launch a terrestrial HD channel, UzHD, in late 2011. On 21 October 2013, NTT, Forum TV, TV Markaz and SofTS all shut down their operations due to an apparent "witch hunt" against Gulnara Karimova and her Terra Group. On 15 August 2019, the DVB-T network was switched off; terrestrial television now employs the DVB-T2 standard.

== Subscription television ==
The first subscription television service was Kamalak TV, an Uzbek-American joint venture established in 1992 that used [Multichannel multipoint distribution service] (MMDS) technology. It shut down on 1 September 2010 and subscribers were told to move to Stars TV or the government-supported Uzdigital TV, a digital terrestrial operator with subscription services, which had started months earlier.

In September 2012, Uzdigital TV reached one million subscribers.

In November 2022, foreign news channels were added to the platform in an attempt to reduce the influence of state and Russian propaganda sources.
