= List of television networks in Uzbekistan =

Television networks in Uzbekistan can be divided into three categories:

- National Television and Radio Company of Uzbekistan (MTRK) networks
- Regional television networks of NTRC
- Private television networks

== Table of broadcast networks ==
All of the networks listed below operate a number of terrestrial television stations. In addition, several of these networks are also aired on cable and satellite services.

Table of broadcast television networks
National Television and Radio Company of Uzbekistan (MTRK) networks
Television Network	Type of network
Aqlvoy	Children
O‘zbekiston	Satellite
Yoshlar	Youth
Sport	Sport
Bolajon	Children
Dunyo bo‘ylab	Documentary
Madaniyat va Ma'rifat	Cultural
Oilaviy	Family
Navo	Music
UzHD	General
O‘zbekiston 24	News
Kinoteatr	Movies
O‘zbekiston tarixi	Historical
Regional television networks
Andijon	General
Buxoro	General
Jizzax	General
Qashqadaryo	General
Qoraqalpog'iston	General
Navoiy	General
Namangan	General
Samarqand	General
Sirdaryo	General
Surxondaryo	General
Fargʻona	General
Xorazm	General
Private television networks
Aloqa TV	General
AYTV	General
BIZ TV	General
8TV	General
S-Iqbol TV	General
Istiqlol TV	General
Muloqot TV	General
Orbita TV	General
Qarshi TV	General
STV	General
TTV	General
TV Bakharistan	General
Umid TV	General
UzTV	General
Zafarabod TV Station	General
Zarafshan TV Center	General
Vita TV+	General
Uzreport TV	News
Uzreport World	News
Nickelodeon O‘zbekiston	Children
MTV O‘zbekiston	Music
Milliy TV	General
MY5	General
MY5 HD	General
Zoʻr TV	General
Zoʻr TVHD	General
Sevimli TV	General
Sevimli HD	General
Caravan TV	General
Futbol TV	Sport
Fazo TV	General
NTV	General
Ishonch TV	General
Jizzax TV	General
Nasaf TV	General
Forum TV	General
Lux TV	Nature
Lux TV 4K	Nature
Margʻilon TV	General
Ruxsor TV	General
Taraqqiyot TV	General
TTV	General
Vodiy sadosi	General
TBTV	General

== Closed networks ==
Closed television networks in Uzbekistan
Television Network	Closed date
Diyor	2014
Forum TV	2013
NTT	2013
STV	2018
SofTS	2013
TVM	2013

== See also ==
- Television in Uzbekistan
- Lists of television channels
