= Uzdigital TV =

Uzbek terrestrial subscription TV operator

Uzdigital TV (stylized in all caps) is an Uzbek terrestrial subscription television operator, delivering its service in the DVB-T and DVB-T2 standards. It was created in 2010 as a replacement to Kamalak TV.

== History ==
CRCBT Uzdigital TV held its first tests in September 2008 in Tashkent and Bukhara, and received its license on 21 June 2010, while subsequently starting its regular services to subscribers. Its launch coincided with the shutdown of the MMDS operator Kamalak TV, which was scheduled to shut down on 1 September that year. Subscribers had to move to either Uzdigital TV or Stars TV, which used DVB-T signals, instead of MMDS. Its launch package consisted of the State package, with four must-carry MTRK channels (Oʻzbekiston, Yoshlar, Toshkent and Sport) available free of charge, Standard (which added Channel One Russia, NTV, Telenyanya, Dom Kino, Domashniy, Russia-K, Muz TV and TNT) and Premium (which added DTV, Telecafe, Euronews, Zvezda, TV3, Channel 5, Russia-24, Russia-1, Russia-2, 7TV, Humor TV, Luxe TV and Muzyka Pervogo). Most of the foreign channels were sourced from Russia, and had less channels from other sources compared to Stars TV.

During September 2010, Uzdigital TV LLC installed a Rohde & Schwarz transmitter in Samarkand and began broadcasting its services there shortly afterwards. It was expected that the number of channels carried by the company would increase to 35 by the end of the year.

Between 2012 and 2013, several new MTRK channels were added to the free-to-air package, coinciding with the shutdown of several private TV channels (NTT, Forum TV, SofTS and TV Markaz). By the end of 2013, Uzdigital had over one million subscribers. In 2017, the company's services reached all regions of the country. On 6 October 2017, it launched its services in Navoiy and on 14 March 2018, it opened its offices in Nukus, capital of the autonomous region of Karakalpakstan. Test broadcasts in the Fergana Valley (Andijan, Namangan and Fergana) began in December 2016. It opened its offices in Fergana in July 2017.

During 2020, Uzdigital's finances went negative by increasing its debt. In July 2022, it started carrying English audio tracks to six channels. In November 2022, Uzdigital added five foreign news channels in Tashkent and Syrdarya: BBC World News, TRT Avaz, CGTN, CNN International and Bloomberg TV. Uzbek bloggers welcomed the decision as means to counter both state and Russian propaganda, by having access to more sources of information. Later that month, it obtained the license to broadcast the CIS versions of Setanta Sports 1 and Setanta Sports 2, with Russian and English tracks.

The company announced its reorganization in January 2025, becoming a part of the new state company RRTM. This did not affect the company's services.
