= Foreign Languages (TV channel) =

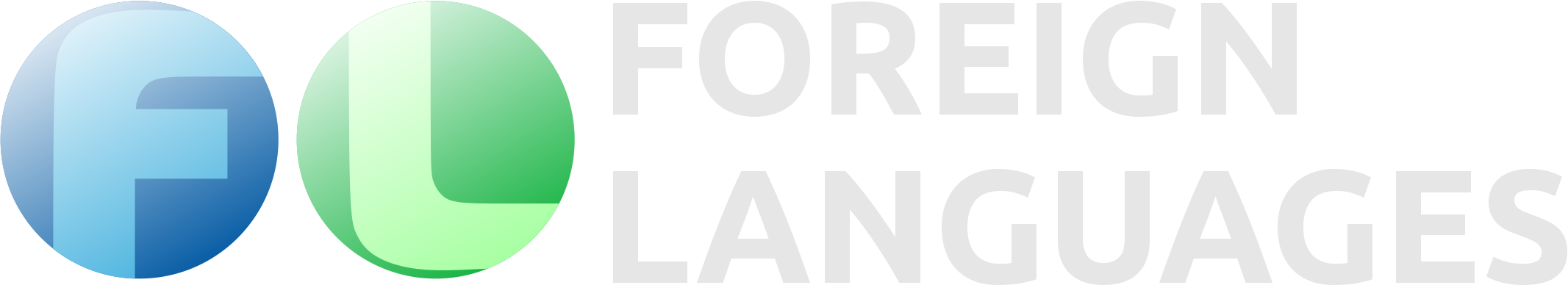
- Country: Uzbekistan
- Headquarters: Tashkent, Uzbekistan

Programming
- Language: Several
- Picture format: 16:9 HDTV

Ownership
- Owner: National Television and Radio Company of Uzbekistan
- Sister channels: Yoshlar; Sport; Madaniyat va Ma'rifat; Dunyo Boʻylab; O‘zbekistan; O‘zbekistan 24; Kinoteatr; Navo; Bolajon

History
- Launched: December 6, 2021
- Replaced: Oilaviy

Links
- Website: Official website

Foreign Languages is an Uzbek state television channel specialized in the broadcast of content in languages other than Uzbek. The channel started broadcasting in test mode on October 9, 2021.

== History ==
On May 19, 2021, President of Uzbekistan Shavkat Mirziyoyev passed Presidential Decree PQ–511 on the elevation of the activity of foreign language studies in the country. To implement this decision, the Council of Ministries on August 27 adopted Decree n.º 546 on the creation of the Foreign Languages television channel. The channel started broadcasting in test mode on December 6, 2021, at 9am, on the basis of the former Oilaviy channel in test mode.

== Programming ==
Foreign Languages broadcasts a 24-hour schedule in various languages. At least three hours of its daily programming are reserved for language courses. Foreign productions aimed at children are shown in their original language, and, where necessary, subtitles in English, Russian and Uzbek (or one of the three) are shown.

== See also ==
- List of television networks in Uzbekistan
