= Toshkent (TV channel) =

Uzbek state television channel

- Country: Uzbekistan
- Headquarters: Tashkent, Uzbekistan

Programming
- Language(s): Uzbek
- Picture format: 16:9 HDTV

Ownership
- Owner: National Television and Radio Company of Uzbekistan
- Sister channels: Oʻzbekiston; Yoshlar; Sport; Madaniyat va Ma'rifat; Dunyo Boʻylab; O'zbekistan 24; Kinoteatr; Navo; Bolajon

History
- Launched: 7 March 1994; 31 years ago
- Former names: UzTV-3

Links
- Website: Official website

Toshkent is an Uzbek state television channel owned by National Television and Radio Company of Uzbekistan, aimed at the city of Tashkent, although with national coverage.

== History ==
The channel likely appeared after the independence of Uzbekistan.

The earliest reference to the channel is from March 7, 1994. The channel was the result of the rename of the International Channel (Xalqaro Kanali) to UzTV-3 (or TV3), which relayed programming from Turkey and Russia; its format later moved to UzTV-4, which is currently Sport. The channel usually timeshared with Omad after 8pm. By June 1995, the international programming was replaced by ORT relays. ORT took over the daytime until the end of Vremya, with the remaining airtime, apart from a ten-minute bulletin at 5:50pm, was given to Omad.

In line with the reconversion of UzTV-2 into Yoshlar, Toshkent became responsible for UzTV-3 in 1998. ORT programming was removed and moved to Xalqaro Kanali.

Rumors emerged in May 2017 that its news service, Poytaxt was being discarded, in conjunction with the creation of a news channel.

== See also ==
- List of television networks in Uzbekistan
