= UzHD =

- Country: Uzbekistan
- Headquarters: Tashkent, Uzbekistan

Programming
- Languages: Uzbek; Russian; English
- Picture format: 16:9 HDTV

Ownership
- Owner: National Television and Radio Company of Uzbekistan
- Sister channels: Yoshlar; Sport; Madaniyat va Ma'rifat; O‘zbekistan; Kinoteatr; Navo; Bolajon

History
- Launched: 29 November 2011
- Closed: 1 September 2019

UzHD was an Uzbek state television channel that was the first to broadcast in high definition. It closed in 2017, around the time other MTRK channels were converting to high definition.

== History ==
UzHD started broadcasting on 29 November 2011. At the time of launching, it was the first terrestrial television channel in high definition available in a CIS country. It was created to optimize MTRK's television resources, as well as its capabilities to produce high definition programming. Programming from external sources was also broadcast. The goal of the channel was to operate until MTRK finished the migration of all of its channels to the new format.

In December 2014, it was reported that the channel's weather forecast was erroneously illustrating Jizzakh with a picture of Khiva.

The channel also carried HD simulcasts of sporting events carried by Sport, with UzHD broadcasting the event in Russian and Sport carrying the SD broadcast in Uzbek.

On 20 July 2018, the channel resumed operations in its former frequency. The channel continued until 1 September 2019, when its slot was used to carry a new channel, O'zbekiston tarixi.

== See also ==
- List of television networks in Uzbekistan
