= Mendirman Jaloliddin =

2021 Uzbek-Turkish television series

- Official poster
- Also known as: Mendirman Celaleddin; I am Jaloliddin; Bozkır Arslanı Celaleddin; Steppe Lion Celaleddin
- Genre: Historical; Adventure
- Based on: Jalal al-Din Mangburni
- Written by: Mehmet Bozdağ
- Directed by: Metin Günay; Nurgissa Almurat; Reza Himmeti
- Creative director: Efe Kubilay
- Starring: Emre Kıvılcım; Yulduz Radjabova; Javohir Zokirov; Feruza Normatova
- Theme music composer: Besteciler
- Composers: Nodir Umarov; Aziz Xolmurodov; Cem Öğet
- Countries of origin: Uzbekistan; Turkey
- Original language: Uzbek
- No. of seasons: 2
- No. of episodes: 30

Production
- Producer: Mehmet Bozdağ
- Cinematography: Efe Kubilay
- Running time: 125-130 minutes
- Production company: Bozdağ Film

Original release
- Network: Milliy TV [Season 1 (Uzbekistan)]; Zoʻr TV [Season 2 (Uzbekistan)]; ATV [Season 1 (Turkey)
- Release: February 14, 2021 – May 6, 2023

Mendirman Jaloliddin (pronounced [mendiɾmæn dʒælɒliddin], lit. 'I am Jaloliddin', Uzbek Cyrillic: Мендирман Жалолиддин, romanized: Mendirman Zhaloliddin; Turkish: Bozkır Arslanı Celaleddin,) is an Uzbek-Turkish television series produced by Mehmet Bozdağ in collaboration with the Uzbek Ministry of Culture and Sports. The series is based on the life of Jalal al-Din Mangburni, the last ruler of the Khwarazmian Empire, and features Turkish actor Emre Kıvılcım portraying the titular character.

== Plot ==
=== Season 1 ===
Jalaluddin faces numerous challenges, including the looming threat of Genghis Khan and the Mongol Empire. At the same time, he must navigate internal conflicts within his own kingdom, including the power struggle between his father and his grandmother, Terken Khatun.

Amidst these challenges, Jalaluddin falls in love with Kutlu Bike, who has been kidnapped by Genghis Khan. However, he soon discovers that Kutlu Bike harbors secrets that she has been keeping hidden behind her beauty. Despite their love for each other, misunderstandings arise, and Jalaluddin becomes angry with Kutlu Bike when he learns the truth.

Meanwhile, Shirin, who also loves Jalaluddin, is pressured by her mother and Uzlagshah's mother, Mihricihan, to marry Uzlagshah. Shirin eventually agrees to the marriage, as Uzlagshah is set to become a Sultan, and she would become a Sultan's wife.

As the story unfolds, Turkan Hatun, Sultan Ala ad-Din's mother, runs away and brings an army to fight against her own son, but Jalaluddin stops the war with the help of a Sheikh. Jalaluddin then purchases a beautiful dress for Kutlu Bike before her wedding, but their relationship faces further challenges when he discovers her secrets.

Jalaluddin, with the support of his mentor, Temur Melik, rescues Kutlu Bike's kidnapped brother and reunites him with his sister. However, Jalaluddin's father names Uzlagshah as his heir, causing tension and disappointment for Jalaluddin and his mother, Aycicek. Uzlagshah, Jalaluddin, and his brother Akshah set off with their father and army to fight against the opposing forces.

Meanwhile, Turkan Hatun, who has reconciled with her daughters-in-law, falls ill after drinking sherbet poisoned with buttercup by one of her own servants. The season ends with the Khwarazms preparing for war against the Mongols, setting the stage for the next chapter of the story.

=== Season 2 ===
The second season starts off with the impending war against the Mongols, which was shown in the last season

== Cast ==
Actor	Role
Emre Kiviljim	Jalaluddin Manguberdi is the last ruler of Khorezmshahs. Son of Khorezmshah Olovuddin Muhammad and Aychechak Hotun. He was a very powerful prince and was a kind and thoughtful sultan.
Yulduz Rajabova	Qutlubeka, beloved woman of Jalaluddin whom he brought from the village of Genghis Khan. Prince Qutbuddin's mother. In the 30th episode, she drowned both herself and her child in the river so that the Mongols would not kill them. She was a kind person.
Kaan Yalchin	Khorezmshah Muhammad. Son of Alauddin Takash, father of Jalaluddin. A sultan who acts on the opinion of others and not on his own opinion. The reason for his insanity came at a time when the state was about to collapse.
Raʼno Shodiyeva	Aichechak wife. Wife of Khorezmshah Muhammad. Jalaluddin's mother.
Gulanay Kalkan	Terken Khatun Turkish wife. Wife of Alovuddin Tekish. Khorezmshah Muhammad's mother. Kibri is a very strong woman. She was captured by Genghis Khan at the end of the series. Jalaliddin's man from the Oghuz came to save her, but the Turkon woman refused. He acts recklessly and is often self-centered.
Javohir Zokirov	Genghis Khan. A famous Mongolian ruler and general — The founder of the Mongol Empire.
Nurmuxammadxon Xusniddinov	Jochi Khan The eldest son of Genghis Khan
Akmal Mirzo	Subutai Jelma is the nephew of Noyon, one of the four great generals of Genghis Khan
Sezgin Erdemir	Timur Malik. A statesman of the Khorezmshahs, the governor of Khojand. Jalaluddin's teacher. He became famous for his fierce resistance to Genghis Khan's forces during his conquest of Central Asia.
Jamol Hunal	Bakhrom. The ruthless leader of the Hashshoshis, one of Genghis Khan's spies
Akbarxoʻja Rasulov	Qutbuddin Ozlok Shah. Son of Khorezmshah Muhammad and brother of Khorezmshah Jalaluddin. Prince of Khorezmshah.
Rayhon Ulasenova	Mehrija Khan. The youngest wife of Khorezmshah Muhammad. Ozlok Shah's mother
Tohir Sayidov	Nizamulmulk. A cautious and cunning government official
Yahyo Poʻlatov	Akshah. Prince of Khorezm, son of Khorezmshah Muhammad and brother of Khorezmshah Jalaluddin. A thoughtful, wise and intelligent prince who approaches everything from the point of view of the state's interest. He is a brave young man no less than his elder brother Jalaluddin.

== Episodes ==
Season	Episodes	Originally released	
Season	Episodes	First released	Last released
1	13	February 14, 2021	May 9, 2021
2	17	January 14, 2023	May 6, 2023

== Production ==
The television series includes both Turkish and Uzbek actors and it is produced by Turkish screenwriter Mehmet Bozdağ, while being directed by Metin Günay. Nurgissa Almurat of Kazakhstan, Reza Himmeti of Iran are also directors of the series. A statement said, "About a thousand people will take part in the project. The series, which will be shot in Uzbekistan and Turkey, consists of 13 episodes, and each episode will be one hour long". Mendirman Jaloliddin is sometimes considered a "multi-part film" or just a "film" for its short amount of episodes and shorter amount of screentime. Uzbek and Turkish artists gathered at the Milliy TV studio for the first part of the production and answered the questions from the audience live after the first episode of the series was broadcast.

After a conference in Tashkent where it was first announced that a series with this name will be produced, an intensive collaboration between producers, directors, screenwriters, historians, consultants, artists, art directors, architects and costume designers began. Tough casting awaited many Turkish and Uzbek actors for the series who had to receive special training for battle scenes, horse riding and fencing. They also had to learn each other's languages. The digital effects of Mendirman Celaleddin, which employs a team of about 500 people behind the scenes, included 200 people from Turkey, England, India and Malaysia. Based on the sketches of Turkish and Uzbek artists, more than 200 tailors worked on costumes for the series.

=== Set ===
The Bozdağ Film set was prepared to build an atmosphere of the 13th century. In Turkey, it was built on an area of 30 hectares and above the two-storey Khorezmshah palace building, 5.5 meters high, which filled an area of 3,500 square meters, 1,200 people worked. Uzbek media has said that the set looks exactly like how a real 13th-century palace would be like. The streets of Konye-Urgench, residential buildings, the central market were also built and praised. The desert battle scenes were filmed in Aksaray, 750 km from Istanbul. It was scheduled to premiere in January 2021 but instead was released in February.

== Criticisms ==
When the show of the series began, different opinions about it began to be expressed on social networks, along with recognitions, criticisms were made. In particular, blogger Eldar Asanov compared the realities shown in the film on the basis of historical theories and listed several flaws in the series. It seems that the Turkish actor Emre Kiviljim, who played the main character of the Mendirman Jaloliddin series, did not like most of the Uzbek viewers, as well as some young artists. Talented actor Alisher Uzokov commented on this in his intro. He emphasized that the main character was himself or Ulugbek Kadyrov, Adiz Radjabov, Bobur Yuldashev and several Uzbek actors.

== Release ==
In 2020, Mehmet Bozdağ announced that he had been working on the project since 2018, at the request of the Uzbekistan government. Saida Mirziyoyeva, the deputy chairperson of the board of trustees of the Public Foundation for Support and Development of National Mass Media in Uzbekistan, announced on Twitter that the historical series "Mendirman Jaloliddin" would start airing on Milliy TV channel on February 14, 2021. The series was eventually released on February 14, 2021. The second season of the series began airing in Uzbekistan on January 14, 2023, and is currently being broadcast on the Zoʻr TV channel.

=== Reception ===
The television series gained attention in Pakistan, and with the release of only the first episode, it quickly became popular. Saida Mirziyoyeva praised the series for its great script and acting, and recommended it as a captivating portrayal of the region's history. She said:

The series has a great script and excellent acting that captivate viewers from the first to the last episode. Moreover, it effectively portrays the history of our region in a colorful language of cinema, making it easily understandable for the general public. I highly recommend watching it!
