= NTT (Uzbek TV channel) =

Uzbek television network

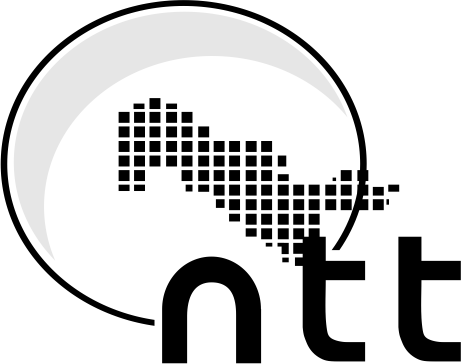
- Country: Uzbekistan
- Broadcast area: Uzbekistan
- Headquarters: Tashkent, Uzbekistan

Programming
- Languages: Uzbek; Russian
- Picture format: 4:3 SDTV

Ownership
- Owner: Terra Group/Forum Fund (Gulnara Karimova)

History
- Launched: 7 September 2004; 22 years ago
- Closed: 21 October 2013; 13 years ago

The Network of Independent Television Companies (NTT; Uzbek: Nodavlat Telekompaniyalar Teletarmog‘i; Russian: Телесеть негосударственных телекомпаний Узбекистана – УзНТТ) was an Uzbek private television network that existed from 2004 to 2013.

Launched on September 7, 2004 by initiative of the National Association of Electronic Mass Media of Uzbekistan, created the previous year, with assistance from 22 independent local television stations in Uzbekistan, the network broadcast in two formats: a daily block of programming that was shared between independent local television stations and a standalone full-time television channel available both by satellite, cable television and over-the-air in Tashkent from 2005. The channel was also available in border areas of Kyrgyzstan, Afghanistan and Tajikistan via signal spillover. Programming was mainly produced by its affiliates.

The channel was led by Gulnora Karimova's Terra Group, whose assets were shut down in October 2013 and was one of the most popular private television networks in Uzbekistan until its closure. Reports emerged in 2014 that it was actually suspended and it would resume operations under the name Sevimli, though it is unknown if it had relations with a later channel.

== History ==
NTT was created in 2004 and was a member of the National Association of Electronic Media of Uzbekistan, a group that included non-government private media outlets. A predecessor association had tried to enter the television business in an attempt to curb piracy, whose first acts were the buying of the rights of the Brazilian series Pérola Negra and retransmission agreements with Russian channel TV-6. Unlike state television, NTT's coverage area was restricted to central Uzbekistan (70% of the national territory for an audience of 18 million people as of 2004), alongside its sister network TV Markaz. The channel in Surxondaryo Region was reportedly one of the two only channels received; the other being Yoshlar. As of year-end 2005, NTT was broadcasting five hours a day.

The primary goal of NTT was to create a mechanism to unite existing independent television stations and increase its number. A first meeting was held on 21 and 22 May 2004 at the Dedemar Silk Road hotel in Tashkent, as well as the signing of a memorandum on its creation. The first broadcast was on 7 September 2004. Months later, on 1 April 2005, the organization which NTT was a part of improved the transmitting equipment of several independent local stations: “Marg‘ilon – TV”, “Sharq–TV”, “To‘rtko‘l TTV”, “Ishonch”, “Qizilqum — TV”, “Bekobod oinai jahoni”, “Qarshi – TV”, “Qizilqum– TV”, “Muloqot” and “Taraqqiyot TV”. These stations broadcast NTT's daily programming block, as well as strengthening its position in the Uzbek television market by increasing its coverage area and potential number of viewers, as well as reducing the operational costs of program preparation.

Initially, NTT broadcast an hour-long block of programming produced in Tashkent and sent to affiliates using videotapes, and later, using CDs. By then, 24 stations were broadcasting NTT's programming.

NTT's first challenge was the coverage of the 2004–05 Uzbek parliamentary election, which was used to change the country's information flow, but was also a cause of concern due to potential alignment with an existing political party. It was expected that NTT and most private media outlets were supposed to be aligned to the Uzbekistan Liberal Democratic Party.

On July 25, 2005, full-time terrestrial broadcasting in Tashkent started on UHF channel 30, and on March 21, 2006, the full-time service was added to Kamalak TV. The full block was broadcast as a separate television channel even in regions where there were no NTT partner stations due to objective reasons. In addition, regional independent television stations prepared programming about the history of the country, its cultural and historical heritage, famous cultural and artistic figures, interesting professions, as well as the events of social, cultural and political life in Uzbek territory. NTT's structure differed from other TV channels. The main work of the network's Central Office was directed to the production of specific programs to the respective editors, coordinating their activities, as well as ordering the creation and distribution of a single uniform program block to NTT affiliates.

In 2008, NTT collaborated with the Kamolot movement to set up a new television studio at the Youth Center in Samarkand in collaboration with local station STV. A survey issued by the Tashkent Advertisers' Association in early 2009 placed NTT in fourth position overall, behind Markaz TV, Yoshlar and O‘zbekiston, in the two-month period comprising December 2008 and January 2009. The channel was fighting with Markaz for ratings, especially on weekends. Before setting up its own TV channel, the UzReport agency produced Business Report for NTT. NTT Uzbekistan started on June 15, 2009, replacing Forum TV in its satellite frequency on Express AM1. The channel was reportedly used by Gulnara to raise money for her new project. In December 2009, NTT broke ground by premiering Your Word, with a heated debate between members of political parties looking for seats in the lower chamber of the Oliy Majlis, the national parliament.

In 2010, NTT and independent regional and local stations aired programming on the prevention of HIV-AIDS, supported by UNESCO. In the first half of the year alone, Hudud broadcast more than fifty items on the topic. Before airing on NTT, items on the topic aired on regional TV. Still in 2010, during a UNESCO gathering devoted to children's programs, NTT's Yangi Avlod studio was ranked as the best in Eastern Europe and the CIS countries. At the time, NTT broadcast its programming to no less than thirty television stations. By 2011, NTT's popularity increased.

On October 21, 2013, NTT was taken off the air, together with Forum TV, TV Markaz and Sof TV. The channel broadcast activities related to Gulnora Karimova's "Fond Forum" (Forum Fund), as well as being relayed on independent television stations outside the capital. The motivations for the closure of the channel were not explained clearly, allegedly pointing out to maintenance work and later, the channel would resume under a new name. In August 2014, the channel returned under the name "Sevimli". Hudud returned but syndicated to local independent stations in 2014, instead of airing on the new channel.

Five local stations (Marg‘ilon-TV, Muloqot-TV (Qo‘qon), Qarshi-TV, Istiqlol-TV (Buxoro), To‘rtko‘l-TV), all of which NTT affiliates, had their licenses suspended on November 1, 2013. NTT owned 49% of the shares of these stations. It was also reported that affiliates were cutting down on their hours of networked NTT programming before the suspension. Only the Darakchi and Sugdiyona newspapers carried information for NTT programming, Darakchi being backed by Firdavs Abduholikov, NTT's head. Firdavs reportedly worked for Gulnara Karimova. The National Television and Radio Company of Uzbekistan usurped the Terra Group frequencies to launch new channels in November 2013.

== Programming ==
As of 2012, NTT was broadcasting outside of Tashkent between 06:30 and 07:30; between 08:00 and 15:00; between 16:00 and 18:00 and from 19:45 to closedown at 02:00. The remaining airtime was filled by local programming from its affiliates. NTT's programs were produced in association with the studios of its affiliates. In Tashkent the channel broadcast a continuous schedule for twenty hours a day.

Notable programs included:

- Hudud (news and human interest stories)
- 24: O‘zbekiston (news)
- Jahon NTT nigohida
- Business Report (Uzreport)
- Youth programs
- Yaxshi kafiyat
- Ozod-shou
- Qopqop (music)
- Musiqa vaqti
- Taksi
- Kutilmagan tomosha
- O Clone
- Comedy.UZ

== Accolades ==
- 2007 award ceremony of the National Association of Electronic Mass Media of Uzbekistan: The Best News Project Aimed at the General Public awarded to NTT
- 2010 M&TVA Awards: Best TV Project of the Year: Diydor shirin
- 2011 M&TVA Awards: Best TV Project of the Year: 25 Frames
- Ozod Yurt To’lqinlari 2009: Hudud

== Staff ==
- Muxamejon Sanginov (director, former head of the independent TV station in Pekabad)
- Kobuljon Akhmedov (editor, 2005–2006; 2010)
- Guli Ikromova
- Firdavs Fridunovich Abduxoliqov (head of the channel)
