= Forum of Culture and Arts of Uzbekistan Foundation =

The Forum of Culture and Arts of Uzbekistan Foundation
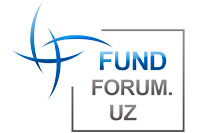
- Founded: 2004
- Dissolved: 2013
- Type: NGO
- Purpose: Culture and Arts, Youth, Education, Healthcare, Sport
- Location(s): Moscow, Beijing, Tokyo, Paris, Vienna, Geneva, Madrid, New York, Berlin and London
- Region served: Uzbekistan
- Website: No longer active

The Forum of Culture and Arts of Uzbekistan Foundation, also known as The Fund Forum, established in February 2004, was an NGO in Uzbekistan, pursuing the goal of supporting domestic science, culture, education and sports. Among the founders and trustees of the Fund were famous figures of culture and arts from Uzbekistan and foreign countries. Chairperson of Board of Trustees was Gulnara Karimova. The Fund Forum was the biggest public organisation in Uzbekistan, and it expanded its international activities, currently it has representative offices in Moscow, Beijing, Tokyo, Paris, Vienna, Geneva, Madrid, New York City, Berlin and London. The NGO was closed in November 2013.

== International cooperation ==
The Foundation had representative offices in Moscow, Beijing, Tokyo, Paris, Vienna, Geneva, Madrid, New York City, Berlin and London. The cultural contacts with partners in various cities of Great Britain, Switzerland, Spain, Russia, Egypt, China, Japan, France, Luxembourg, Bulgaria, Belgium and other countries of were established as well. The Fund Forum was the first among public organizations of Uzbekistan to become an official partner of UNESCO. In March 2007, the two organizations signed a Memorandum of Understanding. Also, memorandums of cooperation were signed with the British Council, the Swiss Cooperation Office in Uzbekistan, China Soong Ching Ling Foundation, Cristiano Ronaldo Foundation, the Austrian Association of Retirees, China Association for the Advancement of International Friendship, the National Museum of Korea, Nagoya State University, Moscow State Linguistic University, Cultural Development Fund of Egypt, Hirayama Ikuo Silk Road Museum Foundation, International Friendship Exchange Council, Chinese Peoples Association for Friendship with Foreign Countries, Louvre (France), Cervantes Institute (Spain), Birmingham Metropolitan College (UK) and Samuel Eto`o Foundation. In 2010, the Fund Forum was granted Consultative Status with the ECOSOC.

== Partner organizations ==
=== Kelajak Ovozi Youth Initiatives Centre (YIC) ===
"Kelajakovozi" Youth Initiatives Centre was founded by winners of various youth projects of the Fund Forum in March 2006 and became one of the leading youth organizations in Uzbekistan. The uniqueness of the centre was that initiatives and projects of young people were created and implemented by participants themselves.

=== “In the Name of Life” National Breast Cancer Association ===
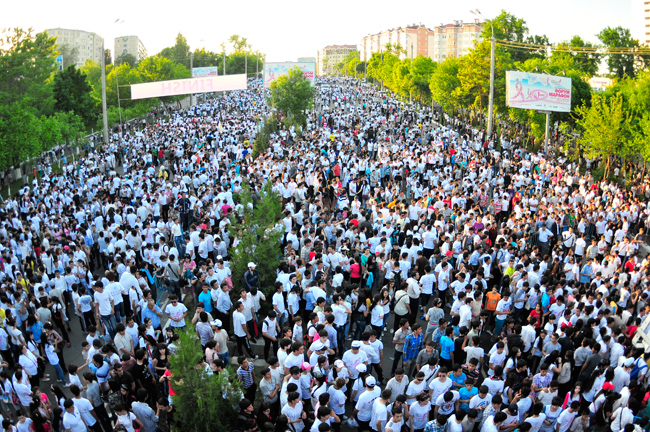
Susan G.Komen Uzbekistan Race for the Cure

The Association was established as part of the Programme of Prevention, Early Detection and Treatment of Breast Cancer and Rehabilitation of Women Diagnosed with Breast Cancer, adopted during the round-table “Joining Forces to Address Breast Cancer and Other Cancerous Diseases”. The round-table was organized by the Women's Council Public Association, “In the Name of Life” Association of Women, EUROPA DONNA-Uzbekistan, the Ministry of Health, and the Social Initiative Support Fund (SISF). United Nations Population Fund (UNFPA) in partnership with National Association on Breast Cancer "In the Name of Life" regularly holds training on the specifics of breast cancer for professors in Uzbekistan As many as 20,000 people joined the Susan G. Komen for the Cure Uzbekistan Race for the Cure on May 1, 2012, to say no to breast cancer. The event was organized by Fund Forum, Susan G. Komen for the Cure, the National Breast Cancer Association, and the Women's Council, the race sought to raise public awareness of breast cancer and raised funds to support efforts in Uzbekistan to fight the disease, which claims millions of lives worldwide. All told, over 100,000 people across the Republic joined the marathon since 2010.

=== NGO “Forum of Socially Responsible Citizens of Uzbekistan” ===
NGO “Forum of Socially Responsible Citizens of Uzbekistan” was founded in December 2011. The primary goal of the NGO was to create an interactive system of supporting socially responsible citizens, small businesses, grant recipients as well as regional activists directly involved in the realization of the Forum's charter goals and objectives which included, but were not limited to, the involvement of participants on a voluntary basis in social programs and projects as partners; provision of administrative support for participants’ relevant proposals; and carrying out public control in practice. In 2012, the Forum considered 5,000 applications through its 14 information centers. About 4,000 people received free consultation on interested issues and the forum supported 300 business projects and helped to receive grants and loans worth 4 billion soums, realize social projects and protect social-oriented business. Over 600 new jobs were created due to implementation of these projects.

=== Social Initiatives Support Fund (SISF) ===
Consolidation of efforts of active civil society citizens of the Republic of Uzbekistan as to the improvement of quality of life of those who need social support. In 2011, SISF obtained consultative status at The United Nations Economic and Social Council which allows to bring recommendations in respect of the cultural and humanitarian cooperation, the promotion of dialogue between nations, education, science, culture, art, health promotion and charity

=== Women`s Council ===
Women's Council was a voluntary association, established in 2005 by the women who were brought together for family care, safe motherhood, proper upbringing of the future generation. Therefore, children, women and families were in the focus of Women's Council.

=== Mehr Nuri Charity Foundation ===
Established in July 2004, MehrNuri (Light of mercy) Foundation gave itself the goal of organizing charitable activities, providing financial aid for low-income families in Uzbekistan, providing sponsor aid for medical, educational and other social institutions engaged in healthcare, providing support for small and medium-sized, family and women's business as well as supporting talented youth. In 2012, it was reported that Mehr Nuri Foundation reconstructed orphanage No.22 in Tashkent, also constructed and equipped the sport complex on territory of Tashkent Pediatrician Medical Institute.

== Main areas of focus ==
=== Culture and Arts ===
Art Week Style.uz was annually organized by the Fund Forum jointly with Dom Stilya (House of Style) since 2006. The project presented a diverse art-menu of catwalk shows, presentations, master-classes from arts and culture professionals, applied art, design and fashion exhibitions, rarities expositions, auctions, competitions for young designers, National Dress Festival, concerts of world music stars, and social events. World famous designers, jewelry and fashion brand owners, showbiz celebrities, fashion magazines’ editors, public figures, representatives of mass media from many countries participated in the Tashkent Art Week. Art Week Style.uz was a crossroads of arts, traditions and modernity. For years, the Week impressed with its scale and dynamics, versatility of its events and attracted increasing attention from famous figures. Being also directed to international cooperation in different arts spheres development and creative personalities support, the Art Week Style.Uz was organized with support from significant local and international institutions, public organizations including UNESCO, the British Council, Goethe Institute in Tashkent, French Institute, etc.

Asrlar Sadosi Festival of Traditional Culture was a project of the Fund Forum which presented all the diversity of the national traditions and customs, handicrafts and cuisine, unique oral and intangible heritage. The festival was organized annually since 2008 in cooperation with the UNESCO Tashkent Office. Every year the Festival was held in different regions of Uzbekistan in historical or cultural centers as an out-door fete. Each of these places had its unique heritage and centuries-old traditions passing from generations to generations.

«Navkiron O’zbekiston» Festival (Young Uzbekistan) Festival of Traditional and Contemporary Arts held once in two years was one of the first youth projects of the Fund Forum aimed at discovering and supporting young artists and masters of applied art. For the first time the Festival took place in 2004 in Tashkent. Young artists and masters under 35 with art education participated in the event from all over the country. The motto of the «NavkironO’zbekiston» Festival was «The modern view of traditional arts of Uzbekistan!» Participants presented their original works, reflecting new perception of well-known styles of art by young artists and masters. A unique mix of the historical traditions and modern trends, of past and present, of East and West was notable in such pieces.

«Bazar-Art» Exhibition-Fair was one of the most vibrant events in the cultural life of the capital city Tashkent, which took place in the Center of National Arts of the Fund Forum twice a year. It had been established in 2007 in cooperation with IJOD Association of Artists, Art Historians and Craftsmen. The exhibition gathered the best masters of applied art from all parts of the country, among them representatives of artists` families and young craftsmen. The project was aimed at discovering the creative potential in modern applied arts, introducing wide public with the most interesting trends in this field, supporting creative dynasties and talented craftsmen as well as preserving and enhancing of national heritage.

M&TVA аward ceremony of music, TV and video art was established by the Fund Forum jointly with the Authors and Performers Guild of Uzbekistan and TVM channel in 2006. The main goal of the award was to discover and encourage outstanding representatives of various spheres, contributing to the development of national arts and culture. Prominent singers and young talents performed during the award ceremony. Celebrities of TV, radio, theatre, cinema and show business participated in the ceremony as guests.

International Theatre Festival “Theatre.UZ” established in cooperation with the Youth Theatre of Uzbekistan, the Ministry of Culture and Sports Affairs of Uzbekistan and Uzbek theatre Artistic Association, in 2010, for the purpose of further bringing theatre cultures of various countries closer together for a better mutual understanding, mutual respect, and internalization of theatre traditions and to expand friendly and artistic contacts, and to enrich theatre life in Uzbekistan by demonstrating the achievements of local and foreign theatres.

Tashkent International Cinema Forum “Golden Guepard” The primary goals of the Cinema Forum were to attract extraordinary cinema works that reflect trends in global cinematography; consolidate and develop international links in cinema; contribute to the development and popularization of national cinema, promote and advocate Uzbek films; present Uzbekistan’s unique historical legacy to attract representatives of global cinema industry; familiarize the local public with leading contemporary films; and discover young talented cinematographers and support their professional endeavors.

=== Youth and Education ===
“Kelajakovozi” Talented Youth Contest annual competition “Kelajakovozi” (Voice of the Future) was one of the most large-scale youth projects in Uzbekistan. It was held among participants, aged from 15 till 25 years in four nominations

“Kelajakovozi” Youth Initiatives Center was launched by initiative of young people and winners of Fund Forum projects. The activities were carried out in seven directions: information technologies, support of youth initiatives, education, association of intellectual clubs, youth press centre, culture and arts, international youth cooperation.

Grant programs for students and teachers Program of Scholarships for Gifted Students active since 2006 designed to encourage and support talented and active junior and senior students. In 2012, about 100 became winners and 90 mln UZS was made available. Educational Grants Program provided scholarship since 2005 for university students covering tuition fees. In 2012, almost 137 gifted students became winners of the program. Grants worth over 612 mln UZS had been paid to cover their tuition fees. Pedagogical Grants Program since 2006 promoting further development of pedagogical activity, improving methods and ways of teaching, supporting creative aspirations among representatives of the educational system. Grants were allocated in three directions such as: for teachers involved in public education (general schools); for teachers of secondary special schools and institutions of higher education (academic lyceums, colleges and universities); for scientific researchers (PhD researchers, researchers and nominees for doctor) and representatives of high pedagogical structures (chiefs of departments, deans, vice deans and rectors), working on innovative projects in the education field. In 2012, about 1470 teachers participated in the project

Spiritual Enlightenment Support Program, provided financial and technical support to spiritual educational facilities with free supplies, textbooks, local and foreign literature, computers, office equipment and appliances while the most talented students are granted one-off stipends.

Project “Healthy Youth” The project was created in 2007 under supervision of the SISF. The main goals of the project “Healthy Youth” were development and introduction of education methodology and program against HIV. The project sought to involve active youth of the Republic of Uzbekistan at the age of 15-25 into the movement “Healthy Youth” through trainings, counseling and youth social campaigns in Tashkent, Gulistan, Fergana, Andizhan, Namangan, Kokand, Bukhara, Navoi, Samarkand, Karshi, Termez, Urgench and Dzhizak. The project was realised in two phases. During the first step active youth from target regions was trained, and then youth social campaigns were delivered in every target city with their participation. During the second step young activists informed the target participants of the problems of HIV/AIDS, drug addiction, venereal diseases and TB, using the outreach methodology.

=== Healthcare and Social welfare ===
==== Support of Woman ====
Family Entrepreneurship Development Grants Active since 2004. This program was designed to assist women who are planning to set up their own family business. Priority was given to projects aimed at developing home-based family business, entrepreneurial skills and innovative ideas as well as financial conditions in the implementation of a business plan.

Interest-Free Microloans Program. Active since 2005. The program was active in all regions of Uzbekistan. MehrNuri Foundation, in conjunction with the Association of Business Women of Andijan, Kashkadarya, Samarkand and Bukhara, annually provides access to finance for low-income women with many children. They also get the opportunity to attend seminars and training sessions on various business topics. “Support of Women Farmers and Entrepreneurs” Project Active since 2007. The project sought to provide opportunities for women farmers in Uzbekistan to improve their economic conditions and quality of life by making available micro loans and improving the level of education and experience in setting up farming activities.

Activities against Breast Cancer The Programme of Prevention, Early Detection and Treatment of Breast Cancer and Rehabilitation of Women Diagnosed with Breast Cancer was adopted in Tashkent, 2010. Within the scope of this programme a great number of the projects were held by the Women's Council Public Association, “In the Name of Life” Association of Women, EUROPA DONNA-Uzbekistan. These were social campaigns, charitable marathons, and actions on free detection of breast cancer for women in all regions of republic, provision of free medication, master classes for experts, international forums and conferences, joint projects with core international organisations. Free diagnostics for women. Provision of free medication for women living with breast cancer

Charity Campaigns Annually Fund Forum, the Women's Council and MehrNuri Public Foundation organized a charity event honoring Remembrance and Honor Day, marked on May 9 in Uzbekistan. From May 9 to May 11 members of the foundations extended congratulations to thousands of war veterans across the country. The organizers of the event visited 220 veterans in Tashkent, people who fought selflessly for peace and went through the scourge of war demonstrating utmost heroism, courage and endurance. Iftorlik, holy month dinners, have been organized across Uzbekistan to mark Ramadan holy month by MehrNuri Charity Foundation in partnership with the Forum of Socially Responsible Citizens. This week holy month dinners have been held in Tashkent. Previously, the iftorlik took place in Samarkand, Bukhara, Shakhrisabz, Kokand, Andijan and Namangan. 1,000 Weddings and 1,000 Sunnat-Tuy The charitable weddings were organized for young couples from low-income families as part of the project “1,000 Weddings and 1,000 Sunnat-Tuy”. Among the beneficiaries were boys and girls who grew up in orphanages or those without parents. Charity Forum Marathon, Football Show “In the Name of Life” as well as auctions were held annually to raise funds to support women diagnosed with breast cancer.

=== Sports ===
Sport Grants Programs Since 2007 grants were allocated to young promising athletes several times a year. The grants of the Fund were presented by leading athletes of Uzbekistan. Since March 2007, 238 young talents of different types of sports received sport grants, totaling 65 mln UZS.

Forum Junior Sport Children's Sport Complex Since 2005 The leading trainers coach children in art gymnastics, wu-shu and other kinds of sports in the Children's Sport Complex of the Fund Forum in its modern sports halls. There were more than a hundred children going for sports and many of them have become successful participants of the international competitions.

"Baby" International Children's Tournament The main objective of the project was popularization of rhythmic gymnastics among children, especially in remote areas of the country, encouragement of young gymnasts to new sporting achievements, identification and support of top athletes, formation of the national youth team reserve, as well as the strengthening of friendly ties both between the regions and on the international level. Competitions were held in open form, and participants were free to choose the format of their performance, with virtually no restrictions on performances staging, the choice of article, music or costumes. Participants could perform both solo or in groups by age, as well as in mixed groups.

Young Footballers Support Program Launched in 2009, The Fund Forum's Young Footballers Support Program was aimed at training a new generation of professional footballers in Uzbekistan, providing sponsor support for children's and youth teams and amateurs across the country, organizing master classes with international football stars and other events as well as providing football attire.

The project was launched in November 2009, when the famous footballer Samuel Eto`o handed sponsor packages to two youth teams of Uzbekistan's Pakhtakor and Bunyodkor Football Academies. In addition, the Fund Forum and Samuel Eto`o Foundation signed a cooperation memorandum. In December 2009, one of the world's best footballers Cristiano Ronaldo taught a master class to young footballers in Uzbekistan. Tickets to the master class were distributed free of charge and many fans from all over the republic were able to see Ronaldo. On December 22, Cristiano Ronaldo also signed a cooperation memorandum with the Fund Forum in Tashkent. In May, 2012 a star of the Uzbek football, the member of a national football team of Uzbekistan on football and player of football club "Anji" (Russia) OdilAhmedov handed over sponsor's packages to 4 best young players (aged from 10 to 12 years) of the following football clubs: "Bunyodkor", "Paxtakor", "Locomotive" and "Chilanzar". In 2011, delegation of "Real Madrid" Foundation (Spain) visited Tashkent during Art Week Style.UZ in order to establish further cooperation within the framework of sport projects of the Fund Forum.
