= NTT =

NTT may refer to:

- National Native Title Tribunal (NTT), Australian government instrumentality
- NATO countries, as per NATO country code
- New Technology Telescope, a 3.6m telescope at La Silla Observatory, Chile
- New Technology Train, a series of the New York City Subway made from 1999 onwards
- New trade theory, an economic theory
- Niuatoputapu Airport, IATA code
- Nippon Telegraph and Telephone (NTT), a Japanese telecommunications company
  - NTT Docomo, a mobile phone operator, subsidiary of NTT founded in 1991
- Nottinghamshire, county in England, Chapman code
- Number theoretic transform, a mathematical transform
- East Nusa Tenggara, a province of Indonesia known as Nusa Tenggara Timur in Indonesian language.
- non-traditional tincture (heraldry)
- The New Traveller's Tales (NTT) engine, a game engine used for the 2022 video game Lego Star Wars: The Skywalker Saga
- NTT (Uzbek TV channel), an Uzbek television channel
