= Yoshlar =

Uzbek state television channel

- Country: Uzbekistan
- Headquarters: Tashkent, Uzbekistan

Programming
- Languages: Uzbek; Russian
- Picture format: 16:9 HDTV

Ownership
- Owner: National Television and Radio Company of Uzbekistan
- Sister channels: Oʻzbekiston; Sport; Madaniyat va Ma'rifat; Dunyo Boʻylab; O'zbekistan 24; Kinoteatr; Navo; Bolajon

History
- Launched: 1960; 66 years ago
- Former names: UzTV-2 (until 1998)

Links
- Website: Official website

Yoshlar (lit. 'Youth') is an Uzbek state television channel owned by National Television and Radio Company of Uzbekistan. As its name implies, the channel aims at the youth, and emerged in its current form in 1998.

== History ==
By the 1960s, the Uzbek SSR was broadcasting three VHF stations. Data could only be retrieved for the first channel, which was broadcasting on channel 3. The 1960 FBIS Broadcasting Stations of the World has the earliest instance of a second TV channel in Tashkent, but without providing concrete data on its frequency. During Uzbekistan's early years as an independent state, it was known as TV2. Before 1998, it also aired programs from the Toshkent studio.

In late July 1998, TV1's news program Axborot reported on the launch of a youth channel (Yoshlar) on September 1, using TV2's frequencies. The new channel would broadcast for six hours a day, before expanding to a full-day 16-hour service later on. The new channel was conceived by president Islam Karimov and was established per Resolution n.º 130 of the Cabinet of Ministers of the Republic of Uzbekistan. In the opening speech, he said that Yoshlar would "open up the world" for the Uzbek youth, to establish their own worldview and to think wisely. The channel opened with programs such as Gratitude, The magnificence of independence, Today's child, Tamerlane the Great, I am the son of a great land, Classmate, On the Great Silk Road and concerts from Uzbek and international musicians. Since day one, the channel also has its own news service, Davr (Times), shown at 7pm Initially, the weekday schedule began at 6pm and ended at 1:30am, while the weekend schedule began at 8:55am and ended at 1:30am. In October 1999, Yoshlar's programming was available on Karakalpak TV for two and a half hours a week, on Thursdays, after the launch of Yoshlar Radio on its sister radio station the previous month. By 2002, the channel was attracting an ethnic Uzbek audience in the Afghan town of Mazar-e-Sharif.

In late February 2002, Yoshlar started taking over frequencies that were often jammed by Russian TV broadcasts in the Fergana Valley. In May 2003, rumors began circulating that the channel was the target of a conflict between parents and their children, where 200 staff were transferred from Oʻzbekiston to Yoshlar and a group of anonymous journalists petitioned the president. MTRK director Abdusaid Kochimov had served his term and, per company policies, such term would never exceed the four-year limit. The president had preferred Khurshid Davron as his successor.

On November 14, 2005, MTRK approved the creation of a joint-stock company to operate the Yoshlar TV and radio stations, in which 51% would remain at the hands of the state, and the remaining 49% were sold off. This also meant that the MTRK channels were no longer operational under the grounds of nepotism, but rather "creative freedom".

On February 6, 2011, the channel aired a programming (Melody and Catastrophe) condemning rock and rap music, claiming them to be created in the 1950s under the guise of "human freedoms", condemning their music videos (which were reportedly filmed in dumps) and believing to be immoral. These genres were given the slogan "Everything is allowed; live as you wish".

On June 1, 2013, Bolajon, a children's channel under its jurisdiction, began.

== See also ==
- List of television networks in Uzbekistan
