= Sevimli TV =

Uzbek television network

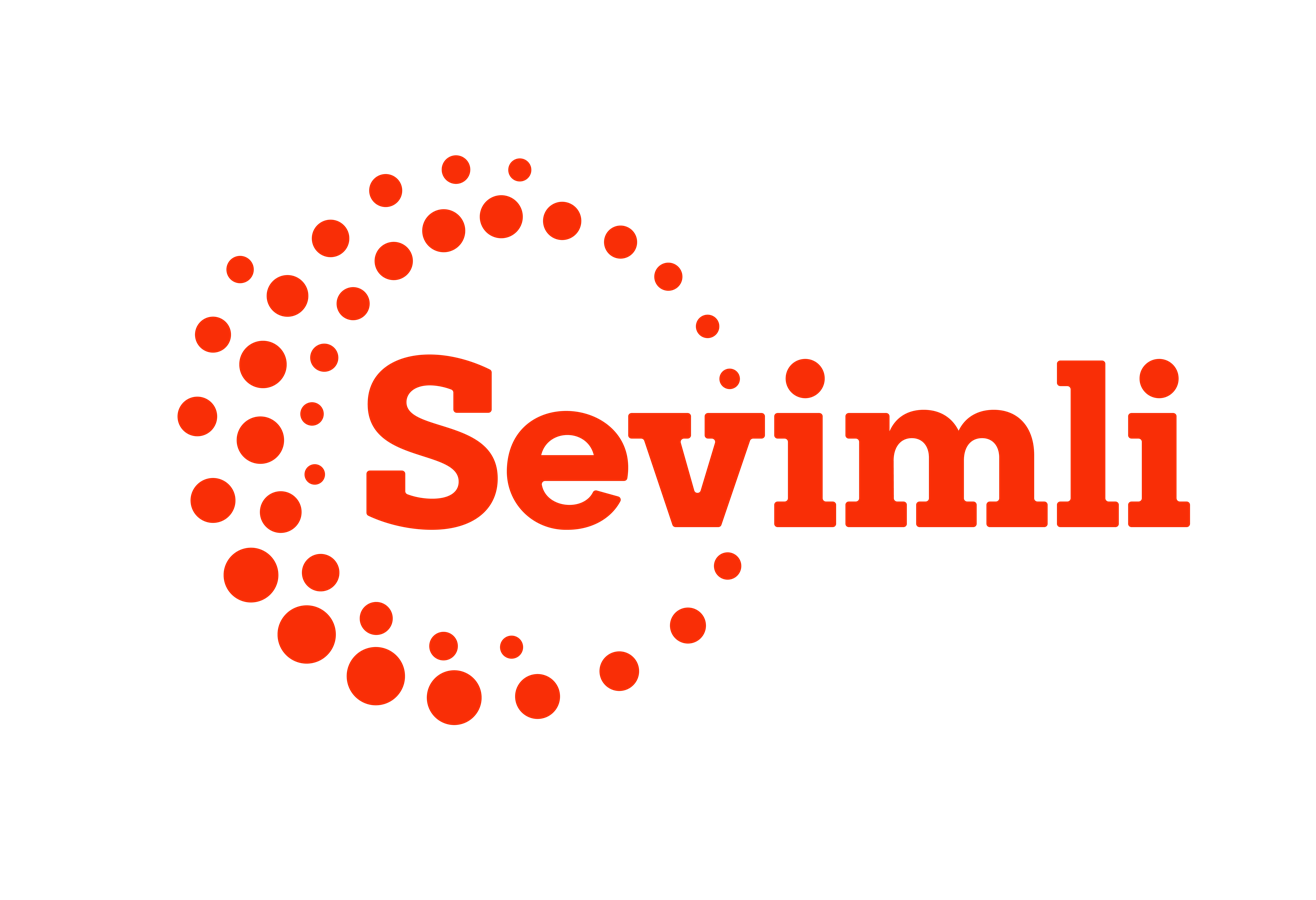
- Country: Uzbekistan
- Broadcast area: Uzbekistan
- Headquarters: Tashkent, Uzbekistan

Programming
- Languages: Uzbek; Russian
- Picture format: 16:9 HDTV

History
- Launched: 1 April 2017; 9 years ago

Sevimli (Favorite) is an Uzbek private television channel. It was founded on 1 May 2017 as Caravan TV, and was rebranded into Sevimli in December.

== History ==
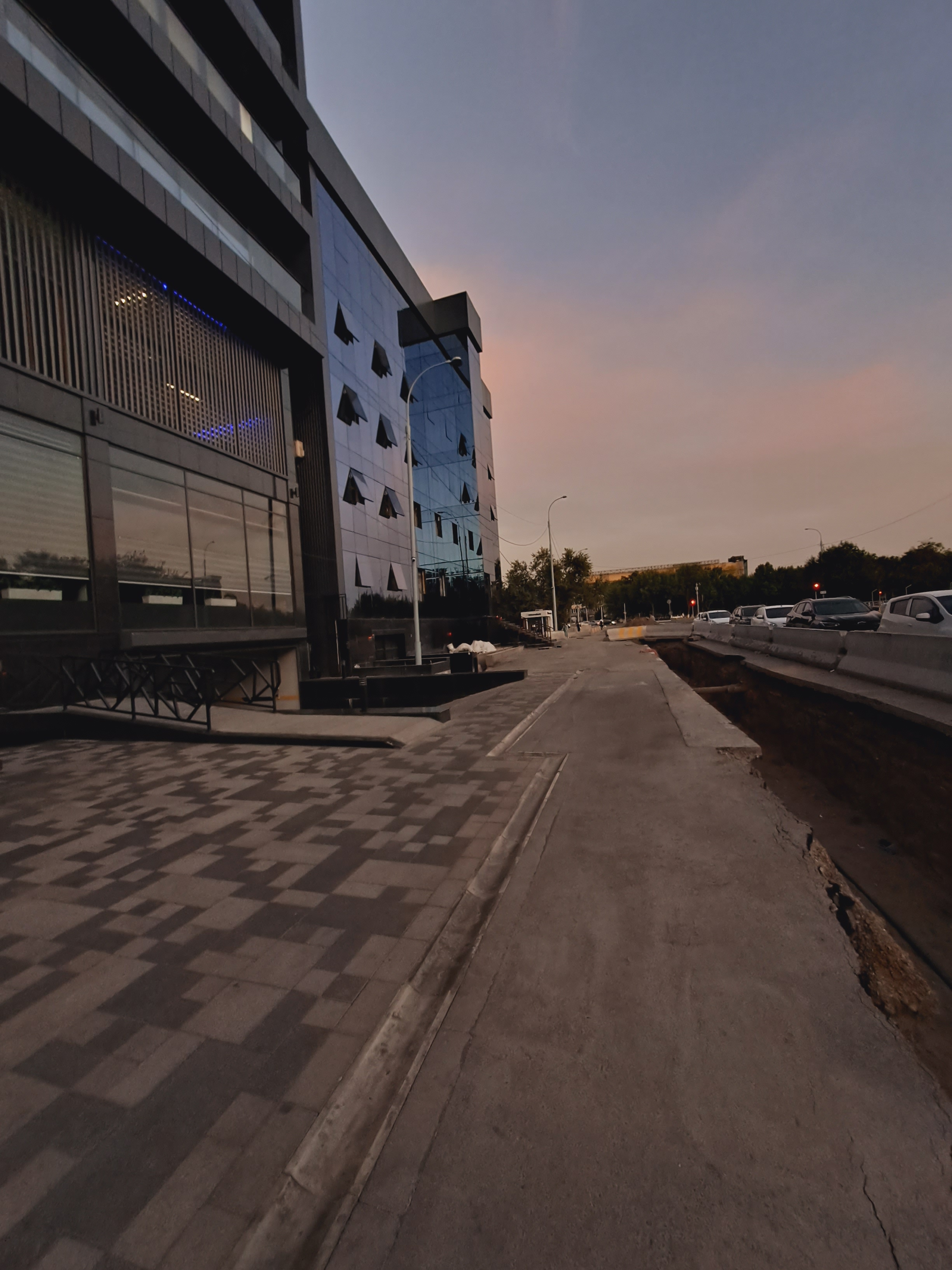
Headquarters in 2023

The history of Sevimli dates back to the closure of NTT in October 2013, when it, and three other channels owned or with links to Gulnara Karimova, shut down. NTT's staff opted to believe that, instead of closing down, it was suspended and could return under a new name later on. It was revealed in August 2014 that the name Sevimli was chosen. It was reported a few months earlier that, after complex negotiations, commercials with Uzbek celebrities were being shot again for the new channel. However, it was unknown when exactly would the channel launch.

The license was finally given in January 2017 as Caravan TV; it is not clear if this had something to do with the previous Sevimli, planned in 2014. The channel launched as a tourism-centric channel on 1 May 2017. Under this format, at launch (in test mode), the channel planned to cover Uzbekistan's tourism potential. Out of more than ten programs Caravan produced, most of them dealt with travel, but it also had music shows. The official launch ceremony took place on 15 and 16 May as part of a congress held in Tashkent and Samarkand on inbound tourism to Uzbekistan and international dialogue. The channel was later renamed Sevimli in December 2017.
