= Elif (TV series) =

Turkish television series

- Genre: Family drama; Soap opera; Romance
- Created by: Green Yapım
- Starring: Selın Sezgın; Altuğ Seçkıner; Isabella Damla Güvenilir; Hamody Nadir; Cemre Melıs Çınar; Hasan Ballıktaş; Zeynep Öğren; Emre Kıvılcım
- Country of origin: Turkey
- Original language: Turkish
- No. of seasons: 3
- No. of episodes: 560

Production
- Camera setup: Single-camera
- Running time: 125 minutes
- Production companies: Green Yapım; (Turkish version); Fremantle; (International version)

Original release
- Network: Kanal 7
- Release: 15 September 2014 – 23 June 2017

Elif is a Turkish TV series that aired weekly on Kanal 7. It tells the story of a 5-year-old girl separated from her mother.

== Plot ==
Melek was a maid who fell in love with Kenan, the firstborn of the Emiroğlu family she worked for. Kenan also fell in love with her, but Kenan's mother did not accept her son's relationship and sent the young pregnant Melek away. The young maid believed that Kenan had abandoned her and he never knew about the pregnancy. Their daughter, Elif, is born while her father is married to another woman, Arzu.

Melek begins a relationship with Veysel, a vile man, a violent gambler who intends to sell little Elif to pay off his gambling debts. The young mother decides to save her daughter and hands her over to Ayşe, one of the maids at the Emiroğlu mansion.

=== First season ===
Elif is a beautiful and gentle 5-year-old girl, put at risk by her stepfather, Veysel Simsek, a ruthless gambler. Her sick mother, Melek Simsek, leaves Elif in the protection of her friend, Ayse Dogan, the housekeeper at the estate of a wealthy family. Ayse tries to get the family's permission to raise Elif in the house, keeping a secret about Kenan Emiroglu, the family's eldest son, and that is that he is Elif's biological father. Kenan had a relationship in the past with Melek that his family did not accept and he was forced to leave. He is now married to Arzu Emiroglu, with whom he has a daughter, Tugce. Kenan has a very close friend, Melih Ozer, who like the family, is a wealthy man, but what they do not know is that he is Melek's brother, who finds out soon after. On the other hand, Selim Emiroglu falls in love with Zeynep Simsek, Veysel's daughter, and they both start a relationship until the final Arzu shoots Zeynep at her wedding.

=== Second season ===
Zeynep's situation is critical until she finally becomes stable and can be back in the family. On the other hand, Arzu meets her father, Necdet Karapinar who will come to ruin the Emiroglu family. At the same time, Arzu is surprised by the arrival of Serdar, who hides a secret from Kenan about his daughter, Tugce. Arzu will do anything to ruin Melek, Elif and maintain her position in the Emiroglu family. However, the truth comes out, Kenan finds out about Melek's secret and now Elif will face a tragic problem. At the end of it all, Melek, Elif and Kenan reunite and try not to separate again, but happiness would turn into tragedy when Arzu ruins Melek and Kenan's wedding with a serious fire.

=== Third season ===
After six months, the Emiroglu family is facing financial difficulties and at the same time they suffer from the loss of Kenan and Tugce in the fire. Melek now works in a haberdashery to help the family where she meets Yusuf Ustün, owner of a bookstore. Arzu will seek revenge against the Emiroglu family for the death of her daughter, at the same time she runs into Umit Koroglu, the Emiroglu's lawyer and both have a relationship. Later, the farm is bought by Arzu and Umit, so the Emiroglu leave the farm, but Yusuf offers them his parents' house to stay. Some time later, Arzu's plans fail when she has a tragic accident. Yusuf now begins a relationship with Melek while Elif and Inci are happy by his side. Then Selim has a tumor and they must help him heal. On the other hand, Yusuf receives news from his aunt who wants to leave him an inheritance but his aunt's son-in-law wants to get rid of him so he doesn't receive it. Selim, Zeynep, and Aliye travel to America to treat Selim's tumor. After that, Melek and Yusuf get married and together with Elif and Inci they move to Bursa to get away from danger without knowing that a tragic accident awaited them.

=== Fourth season ===
Six months later, Elif is in Macide Haktanir's house (Yusuf's aunt) but is hidden by Tarik Karakas, since after Yusuf and Melek's death, she would receive the inheritance. On the other hand, Veysel and Tulay open a yarn business where they meet Leman Yildirim and her son Safak, the owners of the shop. Macide relies on her lawyer Mustafa to find Elif. Meanwhile, Elif is happy at the Haktanir mansion but at the same time, suffers with Vildan, the maid of the mansion. Kerem, Macide's son, receives a visit from Sureyya, a friend of his childhood with whom he starts a relationship, but when Parla, his close friend becomes disabled, he decides to propose to her. Tarik cheats on his wife Humeyra Haktanir with Rana Kaya without knowing that she would betray him behind his back. Tulay cannot bear the loss of Veysel after an accident and decides to move with Inci to her village. Kerem and Parla organize their wedding without knowing that a big surprise awaits Kerem. At the same time, Elif decides to start a new life but on her way she has a serious accident.

=== Fifth season ===
3 months later, Melek and Elif live very happily in their new house, where they meet Asli, their new friend. On the other hand, Macide receives an unexpected visit from her sister Kiymet Keskin, who comes to take revenge on the Haktannir family because in the past, Sevki Haktanir abandoned her when she was pregnant and married Macide. On the other hand, Julide marries Safak and they live happily with their son Emirhan and Mrs. Leman, but she receives a visit from Tufan, her ex-husband who comes to ruin Julide and her family. Meanwhile, Elif returns to the mansion where she discovers Kiymet's true face. Mahir, Kiymet's son, arrives at the Haktannir company to keep an eye on the family, but he begins to abandon his mother's goals. Kiymet manages to put Melek in jail for trying to kill Macide, when Kiymet is really the one who tried to kill her. Melek manages to return to the mansion and be with Elif, with the help of Mahir and Fikret. Kiymet's dark secrets are revealed to Humeyra and together with Levent they begin to investigate further. Macide finds out that Elif is Yusuf's daughter and that Melek is his wife, and now they will receive the inheritance but a situation could cause the end of the Haktanir. At the end of it all, Mahir reveals the truth to Kerem and decides to face Kiymet but she shoots Mahir, Kerem, and Macide and unfortunately that ends Macide's life. Mahir, Melek and Elif are together and happy after all.

== Cast ==
- Isabella Damla Guvenilir as Elif Emiroğlu (née Sımsek/Ustun) - Melek and kenan's daughter, Veysel's step-daughter, Inci's best friend and sister figure, Yusuf's foster daughter, Mahir's friend turned daughter, Tugce's half-sister, Melih, Selim, and Ipek's niece, Aliye's granddaughter, Macide's granddaughter figure (1–940)
- Selin Sezgin as Melek Ustun (née Emiroğlu/Ozer/Simsek/) - Efruz Baba's adoptive daughter, Melih's sister, Veysel's former wife, Kenan's late wife and love interest turned wife/fiancé, Elif's mother, Tugce and Inci's mother figure, Mahir's love interest (1–940)
- Altuğ Seckiner as Kenan Emiroğlu - Aliye's elder son, Ipek and Selim's brother, Arzu's ex-husband, Melek's late husband and love interest turned husband/fiancé, Elif's father, Tugce's adoptive father (1–172)
  - Volkan Colpan as Kenan Emiroglu (186–361)
- Cemre Melis Cinar as Arzu Koroglu [nee emiroglu/Karapinar] - Necdet's daughter, Kenan's ex-wife, Serdar's former lover, Umit's widow and killer, Tugce's mother, Kenan and Tugce's killer (1–560)
- Emre Kivilcim as Selim Emiroglu - Aliye's youngest son, Kenan and Ipek's younger brother, Zeynep's husband, Elif and Tugce's uncle (1–557)
- Zeynep Ogren as Tugce Emiroglu - Arzu and serdar's daughter, Kenan's adoptive daughter, Elif's half-sister, Selim and Ipek's niece, Aliye's granddaughter (1–361)
- Aysun Guven as Aliye Emiroglu - head of emiroglu family : Rabia's friend, Kenan, Selim and Ipek's mother, elif's grandmother(1–557)
- Gural Kizgir as Serdar Arar - Arzu's former lover, Gonca's second husband, Tugce's biological father (182–403)
- Hasan Ballıktaş as Veysel Şimşek :head of Simsek family - Melek's ex-husband, Tulay's second husband, Murat and Zeynep's father, inci's adoptive father (1–741)
- Elvinson Janel participated in vocals (23-204)
- Derya Sen as Tulay Simsek - Veysel's second wife, Murat and Zeynep's caring mother, inci's adoptive mother (144–753)
- Batuhan Soncul as Murat Şimşek - Veysel's son, Tulay's adoptive son, Zeynep's brother, Elif's step brother, Feride's friend and love interest, Ayla's husband (1–560)
- Deniz Irem Morkoç as Inci - Asuman's sister, Elif's friend and sister figure (301–753)
- Umut Özkan as Yusuf Üstün - Melek's husband, Elif's friend and father figure (362 - 560)
- Kivilcim Kaya as Efruz baba - Melih and Melek's adoptive father (58-247)
- Tugba Erman as Asuman Gürbüz - Inci's sister, Tugce's babysitter, Erkut's ex-wife (301–503)
- Ozanay Alpkan as Ayşe Doğan melek's friend, elif's caretaker (1-85)
- Dilara Yucer as Gonca Arar- Necdect's widow, Sedat's second wife, Arzu's maid (1–528)
- Çağla Şimşek as Reyhan Goksu - elif's caretaker in haktanir mansion, Kerem's first love interest (561–624)
- Mediha Aydin as Yildiz - maid in haktanir manison
- Melisa Döngel as Süreyaa - Kerem's love interest and childhood best friend, Elif's friend
- Abodi Nadir as Akin Simsek (561–624)
- Ece Balic as Asli Turkoglu - Elif's friend, Kerem's love interest (758–940)
- Burcu Karakaya as Birse Demiray - Sureyaa's friend, Yunus's work partner
- Cenay Türksever as Yunus - Kerem's friend, Birse's work partner
- Yildiz Gulsen as Sra. Ustun (493)
  - Dilay Senol as Sr. Ustun (Joven) (557)
- Erdogan Tutkun as Nassan Turgut Ustun (494)
  - Ali Atakan Simsek as Nassan Turgut Ustun - Yusuf's father (Joven) (557)
- Nur Gurkan as Macide Üstün [nee Haktanir] - Humeyra and Kerem's mother, Yusuf and Mahir's aunt (561–940)
  - Ayhan Karaca as Sevki Haktanir (joven) (557)
- Ozlem Savas as Kiymet Keskin [nee Üstün] - Mahir's mother, Humeyra and Kerem's aunt, Macide's sister and murderer (759–940)
- Nevzat Can as Kerem Haktanir - Macide's son, Humeyra's brother, Parla's ex-fiancé, Sureyaa's love interest and childhood best friend, Asli's love interest, Yusuf's cousin, Mahir's half-brother (561–940)
- Berna Keskin as Humeyra Haktanir[nee Karacas] - Macide's daughter, Yusuf's cousin, Kerem's sister, Mahir's half-sister, Tarik's ex-wife, levent's love interest (561–940)
- Cem Kilic as Levent Bakır - Humeyra's love interest and bodyguard (758–940)
- Oguz Yagci as Mustafa - Macide's bodyguard, Trusted finder of Elif
- Seyda Bayram as Parla Somer - Kerem's ex-fiancé (563–843)
- Fatih Ayhan as Mahir Keskin - Kiymet's son, Humeyra and Kerem's half brother, Yusuf's cousin, Elif's friend and caring father (757-940)
- Yildiz Asyali as Rana Kaya - Tarik's obsessive lover and mistress, Humeyra's rival and enemy (575–940)
- Murat Prosciler as Tarik Karakas - Macide's ex- son-in law, Humeyra's ex-husband, Yusuf, Veysel and Mustafa's murderer (561–755)
- Parla Senol como Leman Yildirim - Safak's mother (563–940)
- Judge Ferzan as Flame (693–855)
- Ugur Ozbagi as Safak Yildrim - Leman's son, Julide's husband, Emirhan's father (568–940)
- Melis Koc Julide Celik - Tufan's ex-wife, Safak's second wife, Emirhan's mother (568–940)
- Ömer Faruk Çaliskan as Emirhan Çolak - Julide's son, Inci's friend Safak's step son/son figure and teacher, Leman's step grandson, Tufan's biological son
- Hasan Denizyara as Akin Yuksel - Birse's love interest and work partner (765–940)
- Caglar Ozan as Tufan Colak - Julide's abusive ex-husband, Emirhan's abusive father (765–940)
- Gülçin Tunçok as Zeynep Şimşek/Emiroğlu - Veysel and Tulay's daughter, Selim's wife, Murat's sister, Elif's step sister (1–557)
- Ilker Gursoy as Melih Ozer - Efruz Baba's adoptive son, Melek's brother, Ipek's lover, Elif's uncle (19-247)
- Gulfer Sarigul as Ipek emiroglu - Aliye's daughter, Kenan and selim's sister, Melih's lover, Elif and Tugce's aunt (58-230)
- Esin Benim as Ipek Emiroglu - (second actor)
- Gurhan Gulbahar as Necdet Karapinar - Gonca's first husband, Arzu's father, Melih and Efruz baba's killer (187–353)
- Emre Çaltili as Ümit Koroglu - The Emiroglu's lawyer/enemy, Arzu's husband (362–558)
- Melisa Alevok as Ayla Simsek - Murat's wife
- Zeynep Buse Kale as Saida - Murat's first lover, Tugce's babysitter, Erkut's friend
- Aysegul Yalciner as Cherry - Cooker and maid in Emiroglu farm
- Caner Simsek as Tolga - Reyhan's obsessive lover, Parla's friend
- Nigar Sen as Leyla - Yusuf's obsessive lover, Melek's unknown enemy (477–560)
- Nuray Erkol as Fevziye - Leyla's mother
- Serhat Üstündağ as Cevahir Özgüçlü - Melek's haberdashery manager(362–560)
- Elif Tigli as Suna - Melek's close friend and work partner
- Özge Yildirim as Vildan - Julide's sister, Emirhan's aunt, Elif's abusive caretaker, maid in haktanir mansion (561–755)
- Pelin Çalışkanoğlu as Pelin - Selim and Zeynep's friend/enemy
- Tevfik Yapıcı as Husnu Cakir - gardener in Emiroglu farm
- Sinem Akman as Feraye - Ipek and Pelin's friend
- Beril Eda Yesil as Feride Cetin - Murat's love interest, Melek and Zeynep's friend
- Umut Ölcer as Erkut Şahin - Asuman's ex-husband
- Efsun Akkurt as Filiz - Elif's teacher
- Caner Yasin Bulat as Hakki - Elif's best friend
- Eda Erol as Sitare - Selim's taxi customer (467–560)
- Funda Pelin Kurt as Fikret Ovali - Melek's lawyer
- Sinem Burcu Kalayci as Nesrin - Melek's enemy in jail, later becomes her friend
- Gülsah Yavuz as Kader - Melek's friend in jail
- Merve Kayaalp as Gülay - Melek's friend and work partner
- Muge Esmeray as Bahriye - Melek's work partner
- Esra Öztop as Aysel - Melek's close friend and work partner
