= Milliy TV =

Uzbek television network

- Country: Uzbekistan
- Broadcast area: Uzbekistan
- Headquarters: Tashkent, Uzbekistan

Programming
- Languages: Uzbek; Russian
- Picture format: 16:9 HDTV

History
- Launched: 1 September 2016; 9 years ago

Milliy TV (National TV, Uzbek Cyrillic and Russian: Миллий ТВ, abbreviated MTV) is an Uzbek private television channel, broadcasting in both Uzbek and Russian. It is known for its original series, as well as music shows, educational content and some international output. The channel's programs are made considering aspects of traditional Uzbek culture and serves as a platform to present the country to the world.

== History ==
On August 18, 2016, Milliy TV was conducting test broadcasts on terrestrial television, cable companies and YouTube. Broadcasts started on September 1 at 7am, however the inaugural ceremony was shown at 8pm. On December 1, terrestrial broadcasts started in eleven regions of Uzbekistan. Full 24-hour broadcasts started on January 1, 2017.

In January 2017, the channel launched Otalar sozi - aqlning kuzi, a program for the elderly. Originally, it was supposed to be transmitted by the state channel Mahalla, having produced five or six episodes by that time. This countered the presidential decree issued to air the program; Mirabbos Mirzaaxmedov denied that the program would air on other channels. On March 21, coinciding with Nowruz, Milliy TV launched its official app, largely catering the diaspora.

Per a 2017 survey, 10% out of a sample of 10,234 Uzbeks watched Milliy TV, in fourth place behind Yoshlar, MY5 and Zo'r TV.

In October 2020, it announced its intent to reduce the airtime of foreign series, with the aim at increasing the amount of local productions. The series Mendirman Jaliloddin started airing on 14 February 2021, being a co-production with a Turkish company.

In August 2023, the channel suspended Millar and Millar Postda from its schedule after reporting on violence at internet cafés. Its directors did not specify the motivation for the suspension, as the programs touched social issues.

An out-of-context scene from episode 406 of its soap opera Iqror (Confession) circulated on social media in 2026, with many netizens thinking that the scene was real.
