= Emre Kıvılcım =

Turkish actor and model

- Born: 2 September 1990 (age 35); Malatya, Turkey
- Occupations: Actor, model
- Years active: 2014–present
- Known for: Mendirman Jaloliddin
- Spouse: Yulduz Rajabova (m. 2026)

Emre Kıvılcım (born 2 September 1990) is a Turkish actor, model and former chemical engineer.

== Biography ==
Kıvılcım, who was born in Malatya and graduated in 2012, began acting in 2014 by starring in the film Zeytiyağlı Yiyylı Aman. Then he appeared in the TV series Elif and then the film Cinayet-i Aşk. The main profession of the actor, who became famous for playing Selim in Elif for 3 years, was chemical engineering. He said that his childhood dream was to become an actor and he had left chemical engineering for acting. The actor also masters horseback riding, sword-wielding and martial arts. Kıvılcım, who is known for starring in the film Türkler Geliyor: Adaletin Kılıcı, also starred in the Turkish-Uzbek TV series Mendirman Jaloliddin as the titular character. He later went on to star in the 2023 drama series Veda Mektubu opposite Rabia Soytürk.

== Personal life ==
Kıvılcım is married to Uzbek actress Yulduz Rajabova, who he met on the sets of the historical TV series Mendirman Jaloliddin. The couple married on February 17, 2026, in a private ceremony.

== Filmography ==
=== Films ===
Year	Title	Role
2014	Zeytinyağlı Yiyemem Aman	
2017	Cinayet-i Aşk	Selim
2019	Kim Daha Mutlu?	Kemal
2019	Türkler Geliyor: Adaletin Kılıcı	Sungur
2020	Leyla Everlasting	Harun Faruk

=== Television ===
Year	Title	Role
2014–2017	Elif	Selim Emiroğlu
2018	Adı: Zehra	Genco Yaman
2021	Mendirman Jaloliddin	Jaloliddin Manguberdi
2023	Veda Mektubu	Mehmet Karlı
2024	Kara Ağaç Destanı	Ömer

=== Reality television ===
Year	Title
2020	P!NÇ
2020	Eser Yenenler Show
