= Uzreport TV =

News channel in Uzbekistan

- Country: Uzbekistan
- Broadcast area: Worldwide
- Headquarters: Tashkent, Uzbekistan

Programming
- Picture format: 16:9/14:9

Ownership
- Owner: Agency «UzReport»
- Sister channels: FTV

History
- Launched: 2014
- Former names: Uzbek Sport TV

Links
- Website: uzreport.uz

Availability

Uzreport TV is a private non-governmental news channel in Uzbekistan. The channel began broadcasting April 28, 2014 on the territory of Uzbekistan. The channel belongs to the News Agency «UzReport», which to date is shown in the information space created in 1999, the Internet portal uzreport.uz. Before creating its own channel, it produced Business Report for the commercial network NTT.

According to the gazette Satrapia, UzReport TV was launched on 6 May and is part of the uzreport.com media group founded by the SAIPRO news and ratings agency. Both the channel and the platform are owned by Tashkent businessman Ravshan Jurayev, who also controls the Biznes-Vestnik Vostoka weekly and the insurance firm Chartis Uzbekistan.

A recommendation guide by The Program on Central Asia at the Davis Center for Russian and Eurasian Studies, Harvard University describes the outlet as "One of the leading internet portals and TV channels of Uzbekistan, which accumulates and publishes daily news from different spheres of political, economic and cultural life of the country. Uzreport was founded by Ravshakhon Juraev and provides information on banks, stock exchanges, insurance, securities market, announced tenders and auctions, exhibitions, forums, development, etc. Coverage in Uzbek, Russian, and English."
