= Kamalak TV =

Kamalak TV was an Uzbek-American joint venture that provided telecommunication services to citizens and organizations in the Republic of Uzbekistan, using the MMDS system. The company delivered pay television and paging services.

== History ==
It was established in 1992 as a joint-venture between Metromedia's subsidiary Metromedia International, by means of its subsidiary International Telcell Inc. and the National Television and Radio Company of Uzbekistan. In 1994, the company started paging communication services. As of 2000, Kamalak-TV was more expensive than the cable system installed by Republican Cable TV. KTV started with television services. The American side supplied the joint venture with the then-fashionable latest MMDS equipment available. Initially, Kamalak TV was limited to foreign diplomats and tourists; when it was discovered that the potential was narrow, broadcasts of certain channels ceased on 6 February 1996, opting to sign contracts with ORT, RTR and TV-6.

In 1993, KTV provided 8 channels; by 2002, the number rose to 20, with content in Uzbek, Russian, English, German, French, Korean, etc. on 28 channels. As of 2002, KTV claimed 30,000 subscribers. That same year, internet services started and it planned the creation of a cable television service, increasing the amount of channels available. Negotiations with foreign providers were underway, including the broadcast of the Russian Discovery Channel, which would air twelve hours in Russian and twelve hours in English. Some relays of local terrestrial channels were also available, which according to Pular Imanov, were there to prevent subscribers from repointing their antennas, which provided better image quality. A 2001 list showed that Kamalak TV had its own channel, TV-29, relayed state channel TV1 Uzbekistan and offered two sets of packages, one with thirteen to nineteen channels for individual users and a reduced six-channel service for collective users.

As of 2005, Kamalak TV continued providing signals to other cable companies in Uzbekistan. Following the Andijan massacre, the operator began censoring Russian news bulletins; to prevent further dissemination of unfiltered news of the aftermath of the events, small local cable companies who were not receiving filtered feeds of the channels had to be instructed by Oʻzbekiston Kabel Sistemalari (Uzbekistan Cable Systems) to receive Kamalak TV-fed versions which had censorship practices put into place.

Kamalak TV announced in July 2010 that it would cease operations on 1 September 2010, being replaced by Uzdigital TV. The cause of its shutdown was the digitization process in Uzbekistan.
