= SofTS =

- Country: Uzbekistan
- Broadcast area: Tashkent
- Headquarters: Tashkent, Uzbekistan

Programming
- Languages: Russian; Uzbek
- Picture format: 4:3 SDTV

Ownership
- Owner: Terra Group (Gulnara Karimova)

History
- Launched: December 2007; 18 years ago
- Closed: 21 October 2013; 12 years ago

SofTS (Russian: СофТС) was an Uzbek private television channel owned by Gulnara Karimova's Terra Media. The channel was an international affiliate of the Russian network STS who supplied it with programming and broadcast primarily in the Russian language in the Tashkent area. In addition to STS's programs, it also aired content from sister channel Domashny.

== History ==
The channel was registered as a joint-venture between Terra Media and STS-Media in September 2007. SofTS started test broadcasts in late December 2007 on UHF channel 30, which was formerly occupied by NTT. About 62.3% of Taskhent residents received the signal. It broadcast on average eighteen hours a day, as the only all-Russian television station (95% of total programming was in Russian), catering the Russophone population in both the city and region of Tashkent.

Regular broadcasts started on April 29, 2008 As of 2010, it was the least profitable of the group's two channels, with SofTS reporting losses in the first half of the year alone. The main causes for these losses were the lack of official ratings information and an over-estimation of the Uzbek television advertising market. As a consequence of these events, STS-Media announced a restriction of its operations in Uzbekistan in August that year.

The channel was one of the four affected by the shutdown of Gulnara Karimova's assets on October 21, 2013.
