= Forum TV =

- Country: Uzbekistan
- Broadcast area: Uzbekistan
- Headquarters: Tashkent, Uzbekistan

Programming
- Language(s): Uzbek; Russian
- Picture format: 4:3 SDTV

Ownership
- Owner: Terra Group/Forum Fund (Gulnara Karimova)

History
- Launched: March 2008; 17 years ago
- Closed: 21 October 2013; 11 years ago

Forum TV was an Uzbek television channel. It was owned by the Forum Fund (Forum for Culture and Arts of Uzbekistan), a cultural NGO which was connected to Gulnara Karimova. Programming was done in Uzbek and Russian languages and carried musical and cultural programs.

== History ==
Broadcasts started in March 2008 using the Express AM22 satellite to deliver its signals across Uzbekistan. On June 15, 2009, the channel was renamed NTT Uzbekistan maintaining the existing schedule.

In March 2012, the channel started airing a program featuring videos sent in by viewers from their cellphones, Мобильные репортажи (Mobile Reports). The program also aired photos sent in from viewers of their participations in Fond Forum's workshops and events. Fond Forum held an event in August 2012 to train young journalists.

Forum TV shut down on October 21, 2013. Reports emerged that day where the channel was believed to be "inaccessible" in parts of Uzbekistan.

== Programming ==
- Zo‘r Zo‘r Star (talent competition)
- Мобильные репортажи (user-generated content)
