= Qaraqalpaqstan (TV channel) =

- Country: Uzbekistan
- Broadcast area: Karakalpakstan
- Headquarters: Nukus, Uzbekistan

Programming
- Language(s): Karakalpak
- Picture format: 16:9 HDTV

Ownership
- Owner: National Television and Radio Company of Uzbekistan

History
- Launched: 5 December 1964; 60 years ago

Links
- Website: Official website

Qaraqalpaqstan (Karakalpak Cyrillic: Қарақалпақстан, Uzbek: Qoraqalpogʻiston), officially Qaraqalpaqstan tеlеvideniesi (Қарақалпақстан телевидениеси, Qoraqalpogʻiston Televideniyesi, Karakalpak Television) is an Uzbek television channel owned by the National Television and Radio Company of Uzbekistan, broadcasting to the autonomous republic of Karakalpakstan. The channel broadcasts 18 hours a day and airs programming in four languages, Karakalpak, Uzbek, Kazakh and Russian.

== History ==
The first Karakalpak program was broadcast on November 5, 1964. The first news service, Tele Janaliq (Теле Жаналиқ, Uzbek: Teleyangiliklar) consisted of five-minute bulletins in both Karakalpak and Russian languages. From May 1965, the TV station increased from two hours to 2.5 hours per day, four days a week, and from January 1, 1966, three hours a day, six days a week, with the station taking a day off on Wednesday. Around this time, the first Karakalpak talk shows appeared. Additionally, on weekends and holidays, the channel started producing children's programs ("Jetkinshek bizde qonaqta", "Miynet batirliqti qàleydi", "Baliqshi balalar", "Shayirlar balalarģa"). A mobile studio was set up in 1968.

In 1992, the Karakalpakstan Television and Radio Broadcasting Committee was renamed Television and Radio Broadcasting Company, and again in 2002 to the current Republic of Karakalpakstan Television and Radio Company. On June 1 of the same year, the first edition of Assalawma aleykum, Karakalpakstan was broadcast.

The channel produces news bulletins in three languages. A new studio with equipment provided by Siemens started in 2007. In 2010, a new mobile studio with four cameras was set up.

The channel started digital broadcasts in April 2013 and on June 1 of the same year, it opened its first dubbing studio, for dubbed cartoons, followed by a second one in 2014 for movies and TV shows. In 2019, an estimated 95%–98% of the Karakalpak population watched the channel.
