= STV (Uzbek TV channel) =

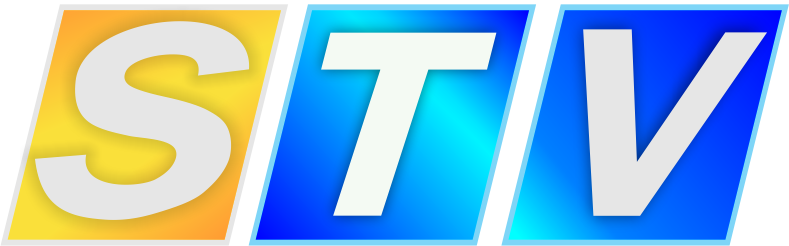
- Country: Uzbekistan
- Broadcast area: Samarkand
- Headquarters: Samarkand, Uzbekistan

Programming
- Languages: Uzbek; Russian
- Picture format: 16:9 SDTV

History
- Launched: 21 March 1991; 35 years ago
- Closed: 21 July 2018; 7 years ago

The STV TV and Radio Broadcasting Company (Uzbek: STV teleradiokompaniyasi, Russian: Телерадиокомпания СТВ) was the first independent television and radio company in Uzbekistan, in the city of Samarkand. Formally founded in 1987, it was officially registered in August 1991. It became the first independent television station and overall media outlet in the Republic of Uzbekistan.

== History ==
In 1987, the deputy director of the Samarkand Printing School, Firdavs Abdukhalikov, suggested that like-minded people open an independent television company, based on a similar experience in creating an earlier student television studio. A youth coordination center was founded under the regional Komsomol committee, whose task was to implement a project related to the creation of regional TV. In August 1990, local authorities decided to create a youth center for the public television company TKS (“Samarkand Television Company”) on the basis of the studio. The first program on the new channel aired on March 21, 1991. Regular broadcasting to Samarkand and the Samarkand region (coverage of about 3 million people) began on May 15, 1991. TKS merged with a competing channel in May 1992, forming STV. The channel, as well as other stations that emerged in Uzbekistan, had a pivotal role in bringing back cultural traditions that had been blocked during Soviet rule.

The TV channel had a generalist offer. For the most part, the content was locally produced, including regional news, reports, analytical and news programs. Films in Uzbek and Russian were also shown. In 1992, the television company was renamed Samarkand-STV. In 1996, the information and entertainment newspaper “Darakchi” appeared under the editorship of STV.

The station gained exclusive rights to retransmit Russian TV-6 in 1994.

STV also collaborated with NTT.

In 2000, broadcasting began on the FM 104.5 radio wave, and the company was renamed the STV television and radio company (then STV). With the development of the Internet, the official information website STV.uz appeared, then pages on social networks, as well as a YouTube channel. At the beginning of its existence, the advertising studio “STV-design” operated, which, according to the creators of STV, allowed the television and radio company to remain independent at first. Broadcasting of the STV channel was stopped on July 27, 2018. The cause for the closure was the airing of violent scenes in I Am Legend and alleged pornographic content in Sausage Party, the latter of which was shown in a 9am slot aimed at children.

== Programming ==
=== TV ===
- Боллалар соати (Children's Hour) — cartoons
- Государство и общество — social problems
- Мохият — presented by the editor-in-chief of the newspaper “Zarafshan” (“Samarkand Bulletin”) Farmon Toshev
- 100% молодёжно! — youth patriotic program
- Шоми Самарканд (Evening in Samarkand) — cultural and educational program (one of the first programs on the channel. Broadcast since 1991)
- Хабарлар (News) — news bulletins
- Телеинформ and телемаркет — commercial programs

=== Radio ===
- Хабарлар (News) — news bulletins
