= Zoʻr TV =

Uzbek television network

- Country: Uzbekistan
- Broadcast area: Uzbekistan
- Headquarters: Tashkent, Uzbekistan

Programming
- Languages: Uzbek; Russian
- Picture format: 16:9 HDTV

History
- Launched: 1 March 2017; 9 years ago

Links
- Website: GoTV.uz

Zoʻr TV is an Uzbek private television channel, broadcasting music, sports and entertainment programming in both Uzbek and Russian languages.

== History ==
Zoʻr TV received its license on March 16, 2016, under the control of radio station Vodiy Sadosi. The channel by then had acquired the necessary equipment and work for the building of its studios began. The channel started experimental broadcasts on February 1, 2017, precisely one months later, on March 1, regular broadcasts started. By November, it had become one of the most popular channels according to local surveys, in first place, by 28% of the sampled population.

Beginning in 2024, the channel started buying the rights to key football competitions, the first of which being UEFA Euro 2024. Later in the year, it inked further deals with UEFA to carry the Champions League and the Europa League. In March 2025, this was followed by the confirmation of the coverage of the FA Cup.

== Controversies ==
On August 14, 2023, channel reporter Nurzodbek Vohidov and cameraman Sardorbek Yuldoshev were physically beaten under the grounds of hooliganism while filming a report about problems in construction work near Tashkent Airport.
