= Dunyo Boʻylab =

Dunyo Bo'ylab
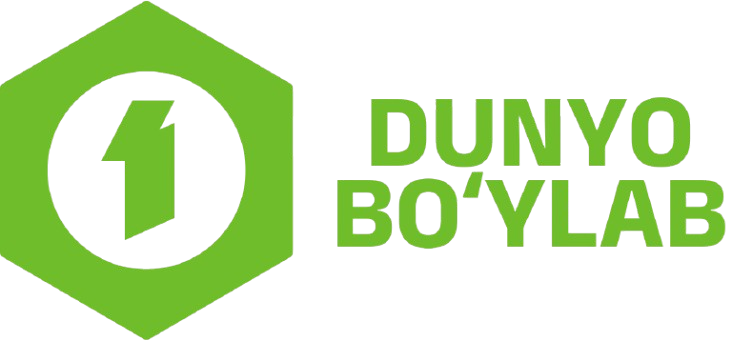
- Country: Uzbekistan
- Headquarters: Tashkent, Uzbekistan

Programming
- Language(s): Uzbek; Russian; English
- Picture format: 16:9 HDTV

Ownership
- Owner: National Television and Radio Company of Uzbekistan
- Sister channels: Yoshlar; Sport; Madaniyat va Ma'rifat; O‘zbekistan; O'zbekistan 24; Kinoteatr; Navo; Bolajon

History
- Launched: December 31, 2012

Links
- Website: Official website

Dunyo Boʻylab (Around the World) is an Uzbek state television channel that broadcasts national and international documentaries, encompassing topics such as geography, politics, country studies, tourism, economy and ecology.

== History ==
The channel, together with Madaniyat va Maʼrifat, was announced by presidential decree in July 2012 and launched by Uzbek president Islam Karimov on December 31, 2012, bringing the total of MTRK television channels up to seven. The new channels were launched as part of a digitization process at the broadcaster. At the time, a digital terrestrial service operated by Uzdigital TV was received by 37.5% of the population.

On February 18, 2022, by means of a new presidential decree, Dunyo Boʻylab was entrusted to the Ministry of Tourism in order to develop the tourism industry in Uzbekistan. Because of the change, 70% of the programming was now in the Russian language and the remaining 30% in English. The language changes were announced in April 2022, causing massive criticism from locals. Since its launch, the majority of the channel's team is unable to produce programs in Russian. MTRK also determined that the new language format was due to the channel's satellite reach and the increase in the number of programs in Russian. This was contrary to a 2021 decree determinating the development of the Uzbek language over a period of ten years. The Uzbek-language staff was relocated to other channels of the corporation.

== See also ==
- List of television networks in Uzbekistan
