= Bolajon =

- Country: Uzbekistan
- Headquarters: Tashkent, Uzbekistan

Programming
- Language(s): Uzbek
- Picture format: 16:9 HDTV

Ownership
- Owner: National Television and Radio Company of Uzbekistan
- Sister channels: Yoshlar; Sport; Madaniyat va Ma'rifat; Dunyo Boʻylab; O'zbekistan 24; Kinoteatr; Navo; O‘zbekistan

History
- Launched: 1 June 2013; 11 years ago

Links
- Website: Official website

Bolajon is an Uzbek children's television channel owned by the National Television and Radio Company of Uzbekistan. The channel started broadcasting in 2013.

== History ==
President Islam Karimov signed a resulotion on 30 May 2013 to create a dedicated children's channel. Bolajon started broadcasting on 1 June 2013, under the legal jurisdiction of the Yoshlar TV channel. A meeting with the British Council led to the opening of an English learning program to air on the channel. As of December 2014, Bolajon was broadcasting fifteen hours a day.

The pandemic in 2020 caused the Ministry of Education to use Bolajon to air a distance learning slot for preschoolers.

Parents in 2024 have shown their concern over the airing of commercials for age-inappropriate products on Bolajon. This was seen as a violation of an existing law forbidding advertising of goods prohibited to children.

== See also ==
- List of television networks in Uzbekistan
