= TV Markaz =

- Country: Uzbekistan
- Broadcast area: Uzbekistan
- Headquarters: Tashkent, Uzbekistan

Programming
- Languages: Uzbek; Russian
- Picture format: 4:3 SDTV

Ownership
- Owner: Terra Group (Gulnara Karimova)

History
- Launched: November 2005; 20 years ago (experimental); 31 December 2005; 20 years ago (regular)
- Closed: 21 October 2013; 12 years ago

TV Markaz was an Uzbek private television channel, owned by Gulnara Karimova's Terra Group. The channel emphasized its offerings on music programming and shut down due to scandals involving its assets in 2013.

== History ==
TV Markaz started broadcasting in November 2005 and began regular broadcasts on 31 December 2005 (New Year's Eve), as Uzbekistan's first music channel. Initially aimed at the youth, TVM later expanded its scope to a wider family demographic, whose programming blended entertainment with elements of traditional Uzbek culture. As of 2010, 60% of the output was in Uzbek and 40% was in Russian. The station was the first to use DVCPRO technology in Uzbekistan.

Karimova used TV Markaz - like the other channels she owned - as a platform to showcase her activities to viewers.

The channel suspended its operations on 21 October 2013. Two days later, TV Markaz released an update on its website, claiming that the channel was set to resume operations under a new name and format.

== Coverage ==
In its early years, TV Markaz had its coverage area limited to central Uzbekistan. As of 2010, the network was carried in the following analog terrestrial frequencies:

- Tashkent: 40 (UHF)
- Fergana Valley (Andijon and Namanagan): 12 (VHF)
- Fergana: 5 (VHF)
- Bukhara: 37 (UHF)
- Samarkand: 40 (UHF)
- Navoiy: 23 (UHF)

There were also plans to launch the station in Kashkadaryo, Surxondaryo, Karakalpakstan and Xorezm by 2012.

The channel was also available on MTS Uzbekistan's Mobile TV service as one of the two available channels as of 2010 (the other being the main state channel O‘zbekiston).

== Programming ==
- Top 10
- M-Files
- Bizning Musika
- Bolliwood Markazida (highlights from Bollywood, also featuring an Uzbek-dubbed version of Koffee with Karan)
- Drugaya Muzyka
- Zvezdolad
- Prime Time (cultural highlights in Tashkent)
- Jannat Makon (TV version of the magazine of the same name)
- Kinokur'er (news and information about premieres from Uzbek and international cinema)
- Prem'era (news from the Uzbek music scene)
- Baby Terra Landiya (TV version of the Baby Terra magazine)
