= Sport (Uzbek TV channel) =

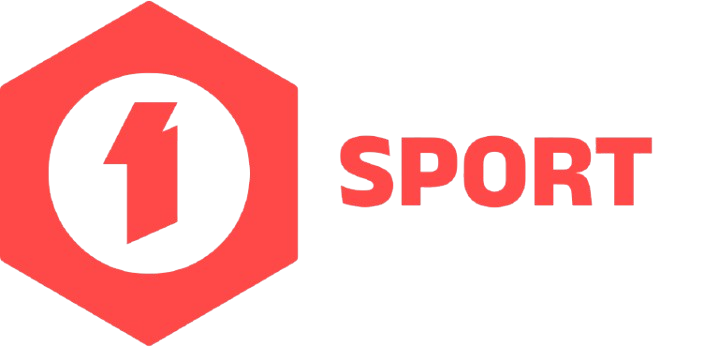
- Country: Uzbekistan
- Headquarters: Tashkent, Uzbekistan

Programming
- Languages: Uzbek, Russian
- Picture format: 16:9 (HDTV)

Ownership
- Owner: National Television and Radio Company of Uzbekistan
- Sister channels: Yoshlar; O‘zbekistan; Madaniyat va Ma'rifat; Dunyo Boʻylab; O'zbekistan 24; Kinoteatr; Navo; Bolajon

History
- Launched: 1990s
- Former names: UzTV-4 (until 2004); SporTV

Links
- Website: Official website

Sport (Uzbek: “Sport” telekanali) is a sports state public television channel of Uzbekistan, owned by the National Television and Radio Company of Uzbekistan. Broadcasting is conducted in Uzbek and partially Russian throughout the territory of Uzbekistan, on a 24-hour basis. The headquarters are located in Tashkent.

Before 2004, the channel was known as UzTV-4, a channel that relayed some of the content of the two Russian state channels, ORT and RTR. In addition to Russian programs, there were also Turkish state TV programs in their original language, BBC material (some in English, some translated into Russian or Uzbek), DW-TV (translated) and Doordarshan content (translated). In 2001, the channel started airing CNN Show, which was compiled from materials received off CNN International.

== Programming ==
The TV channel broadcasts various sports tournaments and events, as well as sports-related programs and programs. The TV channel broadcasts matches of the Uzbekistan Football Championship and the AFC Champions League. In 2010, matches of the 2010 FIFA World Cup in South Africa were broadcast. In 2011, the matches of the 2011 Asian Cup were broadcast. In 2012, the Summer Olympic Games in London and the Euro 2012 matches were broadcast, which took place in Poland and Ukraine. Until 2014, the channel broadcast football matches of the UEFA Champions League, UEFA Europa League, championships of England, Spain, Italy and Germany. In addition, the central matches of the championships of France and Holland were broadcast. In 2015, the channel broadcast matches of the Asian Cup and Copa América 2015. The channel also broadcast matches of the Euro 2016 qualifying tournament. In addition, the TV channel broadcast the World Football Championships among youth and youth teams. In addition to football matches, the channel broadcasts tennis, basketball, hockey, volleyball and other sports matches and tournaments.

On 8 December 2018, the channel started broadcasting in HD.

== Accolades ==
- 2010 M&TVA Awards: Best TV Host of the Year: Nilufar Satibaldiyeva

== See also ==
- List of television networks in Uzbekistan
