= National Television and Radio Company of Uzbekistan =

National broadcaster of Uzbekistan

National Television and Radio Company of Uzbekistan (MTRK)
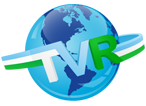

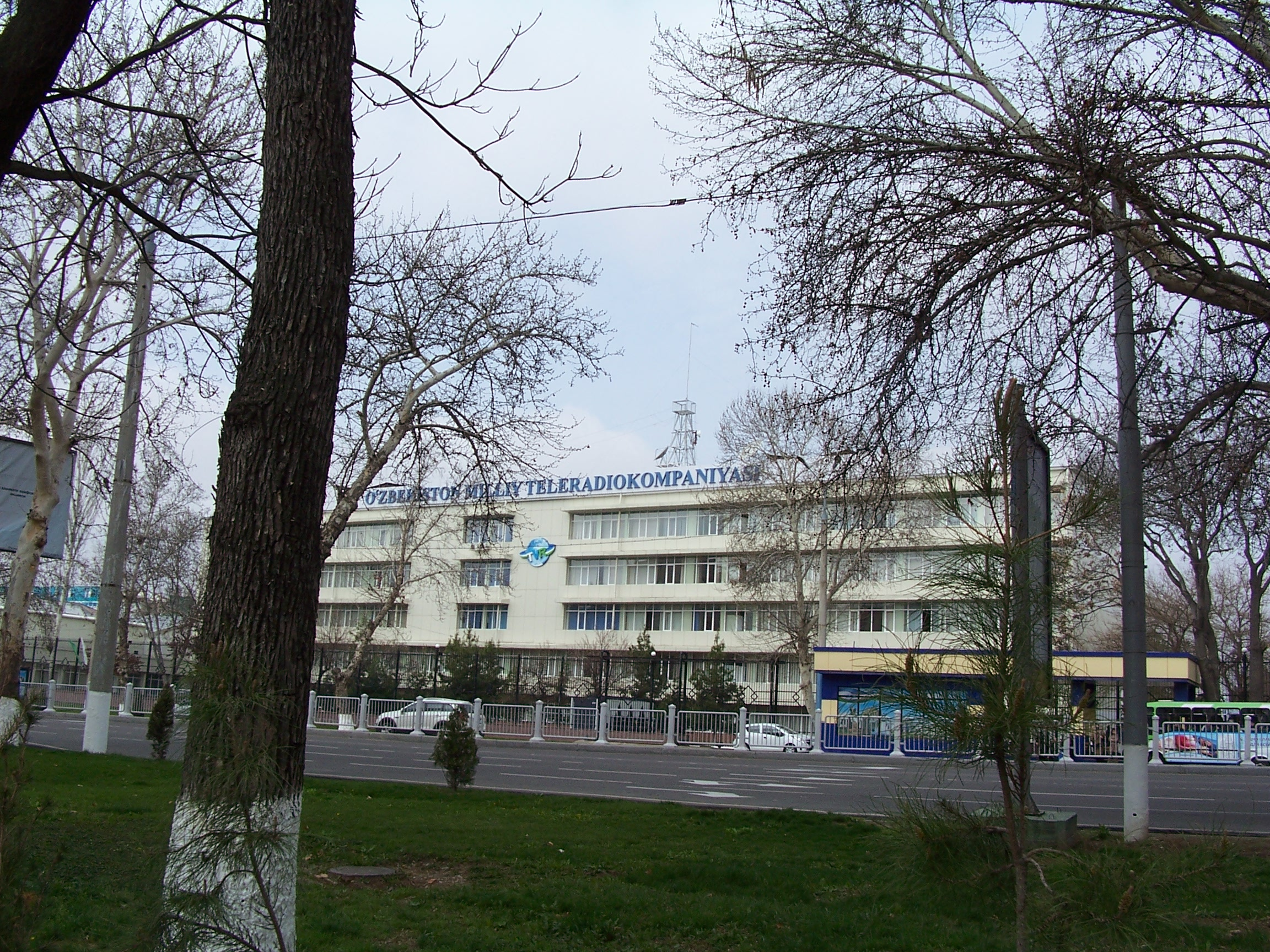
- Type: Broadcast radio and television
- Availability: National; International
- Founded: 11 February 1927; 99 years ago (Radio); 5 November 1956; 69 years ago (Television)
- Headquarters: Tashkent, Uzbekistan
- Owner: Government of Uzbekistan
- Key people: Alisher Khojayev (General Director)
- Official website: www.mtrk.uz
- Language: Uzbek, Russian

The National Television and Radio Company of Uzbekistan (Uzbek: Oʻzbekiston Milliy teleradiokompaniyasi, Ўзбекистон Миллий телерадиокомпанияси. [ozbɛkiˈstɒn milˈlij tʲɪlʲɪˌradio.kəmˈpanʲɪjəsi], MTRK) is the national broadcaster of Uzbekistan, operating four television networks.

As of 1961, Tashkent was generating two television stations, with the main station on channel 3 and a second station on an unknown frequency. The Tashkent station also relayed its signal to other cities in the Uzbek SSR.

Two new channels were launched by the company in early 2013: Madaniyat va Maʼrifat ('Culture and Enlightenment') and Dunyo boʻylab ('Around the World'). By the end of the year, four new channels were launched using the frequencies of private television channels which were prohibited by the Uzbek authorities.

In January 2013, the organisation's website was hacked by someone who was going with the handle @CloneSecurity. The attack was said to have been launched for political reasons.

== History ==
=== Pre-history (1927–1933) ===
On 11 February 1927, the NKHR of the Uzbek SSR launched the Uzbek Radio radio station on medium waves, and in the same year the Bukhara Regional Radio was launched.

In January 1927, the head of the Russian department of the Uzbek Radio, Sumbatov, invited NASSU student Nazirkhon Kamolov to work as the head of the Uzbek department and announcer at the newly created Radio of Uzbekistan. On 11 February 1927, announcer N. Kamolov went on air for the first time in the radio program “Tashkent Speaks” in the Uzbek language. The date 11 February 1927 is considered the date of birth of Uzbek radio. Nazirkhon Kamolov is considered the first announcer and founder of Radio Uzbekistan.

In 1927, Uzbek Radio broadcast in the Uzbek language for two hours every day. The program consisted of news and concerts, with occasional lectures and interviews. Participants in the first radio concerts were: Benjamin Davidov, Nina Davydova and Berta Davydova.

To improve the quality of radio broadcasts, N. Kamolov turned to the Union of Art Critics of Uzbekistan for help. Cultural figures Yunus Rajabi, Rizki Rajabi, Ortikhoja Imomkhodjaev, Mulla Tuichi Toshmukhammedov, Tukhtasin Jalilov, musicians Abdukodir Naichi, Akhmad Azam, Raim Okhun and others took an active part in the concert radio broadcasts.

As head of the Uzbek department of Radio Uzbekistan, N. Kamolov trained many young national personnel. N. Kamolov worked as the head of the Uzbek department and announcer of the Uzbek radio until June 1928. Instead of himself, he left his student, college student Khodzhimurod Avazkhodzhaev, as the announcer. Subsequently, Fotima Yunusova, Tuiguna Yunuskhodzhaeva, Kodir Makhsumov worked as announcers of the Uzbek radio. K. Rashidov, Uktam Zhobirov, Nasiba Ibrokhimova, Kodir Tozhiev, Mirzokhid Rakhimov, Farkhod Bobojonov and others.

The founders and organizers of Radio Uzbekistan are the head of the department and the first announcer Nazirkhon Kamolov and the first director Iskandar Kalandarov.

=== Committee of Radiofication and Broadcasting of the Council of People's Commissars of the Uzbek SSR (1933–1952) ===
In 1933, the Committee of Radiofication and Radio Broadcasting of the SNK of the Uzbek SSR (Radio Committee of the UzSSR) was created, in the same year the Committee of Radiofication and Radio Broadcasting of the SNK of the Karakalpak Autonomous Soviet Socialist Republic was created, in 1938 - the Radiofication and Radio Broadcasting Committees of Fergana, Khorezm, Bukhara and Samarkand, in 1941 - Surkhandarya, Andijan and Namangan, in 1943 - Kashkadarya regional executive committees. In 1932, Namangan Radio was launched on a common frequency with the First Program, in 1934 - Andijan Radio, in 1936, Khorezm Radio, in 1940, Surkhandarya Radio, in 1946, Kashkadarya radio. In 1947, the Radio Committee of the UzSSR began broadcasting on short waves to foreign countries (under the call sign “Radio Tashkent”).

=== Main Directorate of Radio Information of the Ministry of Culture of the Uzbek SSR (1952–1957) ===
In 1952, the Radio Committee of the UzSSR was reorganized into the Main Directorate of Radio Information of the Ministry of Culture of the UzSSR, regional radio committees into radio information departments of regional cultural departments. In 1956, the Tashkent television studio was created, which began to operate under his leadership, consisting of socio-political, literary, dramatic, musical and children's and youth editorial offices, and the Tashkent television center, operating under the leadership of the Ministry of Communications of the Uzbek SSR, to which the built in the same year, a hardware-studio complex, which had one television studio and one mock-up studio, at the same time, radio broadcasts on shortwave began.

=== State Television and Radio of the Uzbek SSR (1957–1991) ===
In 1957, the Main Directorate of Radio Information of the Ministry of Culture of the Uzbek SSR was liquidated, and in its place the State Committee of the Council of Ministers of the Uzbek SSR on Television and Radio Broadcasting was created, which was renamed several times: since 1967 - the State Committee of the Council of Ministers of the Uzbek SSR on Television and Radio Broadcasting, since 1978 - The State Committee of the Uzbek SSR on Television and Radio Broadcasting (Gosteleradio of the Uzbek SSR), accordingly, instead of the radio information departments of the cultural departments of the regional executive committees, the management of regional radio broadcasting was transferred to the committees on radio and television of the regional executive committees (since 1967 - to the committees on television and radio broadcasting of the regional executive committees). In 1964, the Khorezm and Nukus television studios were created (both included the main editorial offices of socio-political programs, feature programs, and a program and production department). In 1969, the Tashkent television center was transferred to the State Committee of the Council of Ministers of the Uzbek SSR for Television and Radio Broadcasting and renamed the Republican Television Center, its transmitting part was left within the Ministry of Communications of the Uzbek SSR as the Republican Radio and Television Transmitting Station. In 1970, the Main Editorial Board for the preparation of television films was created (produced television films under the signature “Uzbektelefilm”). In 1977, the Republican Television Center was given a new hardware-studio complex, consisting of 3 hardware-studio blocks, 5 hardware-software blocks, a central hardware room, telecine projection and video recording hardware.

=== State Television and Radio Broadcasting Company of Uzbekistan (1992-1996) ===
After 31 August 1991, the State Television and Radio Broadcasting Company of the Uzbek SSR was renamed the State Committee of the Republic of Uzbekistan on Television and Radio Broadcasting (Gosteleradio of the Republic of Uzbekistan), and on 7 January 1992, it was in turn reorganized into the State Television and Radio Company of Uzbekistan (STRC of Uzbekistan), committees on television and radio broadcasting of regional executive committees to regional television and radio companies. The State Television and Radio Broadcasting Company of Uzbekistan conducted television broadcasting on 4 networks, including the broadcast of programs of the RGTRK "Ostankino" and programs of the republics of Central Asia and Kazakhstan, radio broadcasting on 4 networks, including the radio program of the RGTRK "Ostankino" "Radio Mayak", consisted of creative and production structures of the republican television, republican radio broadcasting, radio broadcasting to foreign countries, production and technical units, television and radio broadcasting of the Republic of Karakalpakstan, regions and city radio broadcasting offices. In the 1990s, the State Television and Radio Broadcasting Company of Uzbekistan launched TV channels UzTV-1, UzTV-2, UzTV-3, and UzTV-4 (the broadcast partly consisted of broadcasts of Russian channels ORT and RTR), as well as the 2nd, 3rd and 4th programs of Uzbek radio, “Uzbek radio” itself began to be called the 1st program of Uzbek radio. The frequencies of the 1st program of the All-Union Radio went to the 1st program of the Uzbek Radio, the frequencies of Mayak - to the 2nd program of the Uzbek Radio, the frequencies of the 3rd program of the All-Union Radio - to the 3rd Uzbek Radio, the old frequency of the Uzbek Radio - to the 4th program of the Uzbek Radio. At the same time, the widespread development of regional state television began on a common frequency with UzTV-2: in 1992, the start of the transmission of Surxondaryo, and Fergana Television, in 1994 - Buxara Television, in 1995 - Qashqadaryo Television, in 1996 - Jizzax television and Syrdarya television (Samarkand and Namangan television began broadcasting in an earlier period - in 1989 and 1990, respectively, Navoiy's television station in a later period, in 2002). In 1992 it started a joint-venture with American company International Telcell Inc. to provide subscription television services to Uzbekistan, Kamalak TV.

The first years of radio and television in independent Uzbekistan were marked by government control, as the company was subsidized by the government, and television was seen as a propaganda tool. Over time, it had to face stiff competition from private local television channels, which were sprouting across the country.

=== Television and Radio Company of Uzbekistan (1996–2005) ===
On 7 May 1996, the State Television and Radio Broadcasting Company of Uzbekistan was renamed the Television and Radio Company of Uzbekistan. The television and radio company included administrative and managerial personnel, television (General Directorate of Television Programs, thematic directorates of information programs, international programs, artistic programs, music and entertainment programs, socio-political and educational programs, sports and youth programs, information and entertainment programs TV-2, a group of television operators, sound engineers, artists, announcers, production sector, typewriting bureau, letters and sociology department), radio broadcasting (general directorate of Republican Radio programs, thematic main editorial offices of “Axborot” (“News”), international programs, socio-political programs, economics and agriculture, literary programs, music programs, “Dustlik” (“Friendship”), educational programs, sports programs, “Mash’al”, “Yoshlik”, “Tashkent”, city editorial offices in the Tashkent region, advertising and commercial group, announcer group, directing group, correspondent network and sociology group, Directorate of Broadcasting to Foreign Countries (included thematic main editorial offices: information broadcasting to foreign countries, “Vatandosh”, broadcasting to European countries, “Osiyo”, “Shark”, radio interceptions) Directorate of artistic groups (National Variety Orchestra, Chamber Orchestra, Orchestra of Folk Instruments, Honored Choral Group, Children's Choir "Bulbulcha", Ensemble "Makom", Ensemble of Dutarists, Dance Theater "Tanovar", Conversation Artists)).

Also, the television and radio company had jurisdiction over enterprises with the rights of a legal entity “Uzbektelefilm Studio”, “Republican Television Center”, “Republican House of Radio Broadcasting and Sound Recording”, “Nukus Radio Television Center”, as well as enterprises providing services to employees of the television and radio company.

Territorial television and radio companies had the rights of a legal entity, each of them was jointly established by the TRC of Uzbekistan and regional administrations (khokimiyats) of the regions or the Council of Ministers of the Republic of Karakalpakstan, each of them included administrative and managerial personnel (HR Department, Legal Service, Economics Department and the Department of Finance, Accounting and Reporting, the Department of Capital Construction and Technical Department) and the Department of Planning and Production, the Television and Radio Company of the Republic of Karakalpakstan also included the Muhallis Ensemble of Dutarists, the Song and Dance Ensemble, the Orchestra of Folklore Instruments, Khorezm Regional Television and Radio Company - Ensemble "Khorazm" makomi."

Later, the first program of Uzbek radio was renamed “Oʻzbekiston”, the second to Yoshlar, the third to Toshkent, the fourth to Mahalla, UzTV-1 to Oʻzbekiston, UzTV-2 to Yoshlar, UzTV-3 to Toshkent, UzTV-4 to Sport. The changes were triggered by the creation of the Yoshlar TV and radio brand on 1 September 1998.

=== National Television and Radio Company of Uzbekistan (since 2005) ===
On 8 November 2005, TRC of Uzbekistan was reorganized into NTRK of Uzbekistan, within which the state unitary enterprises “Teleradio channel “Uzbekistan” (based on the TV channel “Uzbekistan” and radio channel “Uzbekistan”), “Teleradio channel “Sport” (based on the TV channel "Sport") and TV and Radio Channel "Tashkent" (based on the TV channel "Tashkent" and radio channel "Dustlik"), Joint-Stock Company "Teleradikanal "Yoshlar" (based on the TV channel "Yoshlar" and radio channel "Yoshlar", 50% of the shares of the joint-stock company "Teleradiokanal" "Yoshlar" remains the property of the state, and 50% is considered the share of the Youth Union of Uzbekistan, the right to manage the state share of shares in JSC "Television and Radio Channel "Yoshlar" is delegated to NTRK of Uzbekistan), the enterprises "Republican Television Center", "Republican House of Radio Broadcasting and Sound Recording" and "Nukus TV and Radio Center" were merged into the state unitary enterprise "Republican TV and Radio Center" (Respublika teleradiomarkazi), the Uzbektelefilm Studio was reorganized into the State Unitary Enterprise "Uzbektelefilm" (O'zbektelefilm). At the time, the image it had of being accused of nepotism was replaced by what they called "creative freedom". On 31 March 2006, Tashkent International Radio was closed. On 13 December 2013, NTRK of Uzbekistan launched the Oilaviy and Diyor TV channels. In 2017, the Toshkent radio station was closed; on its frequency, the radio station Oʻzbekiston 24 was launched. In April 2021, MTRK launched its OTT service.

== TV channels ==
=== Nationwide ===
- Oʻzbekiston (flagship national channel)
  - Uzbekistan (satellite version of Oʻzbekiston)
- Yoshlar (youth channel)
- Sport
- UzHD (High Definition channel)
- Madaniyat va Maʼrifat (Culture and Enlightenment)
- Dunyo Boʻylab (Around the World)
- Bolajon (children's channel, offspring of Yoshlar)
- Navo (music channel, offspring of Yoshlar)
- Oilaviy (family channel, offspring of Oʻzbekiston)
- Diyor (country)
- Kinoteatr (movie channel, offspring of Dunyo Bo'ylab)
- Mahalla (society)
- Oʻzbekiston 24 (news channel)
- Oʻzbekiston tarixi (historical channel, formerly UZHD)
- Foreign languages (multilingual channel and news service)

=== Regional ===
- Andijon (Andijan)
- Buxoro (Bukhara)
- Farg‘ona (Fergana)
- Jizzax (Jizzakh)
- Namangan
- Navoiy
- Qaraqalpaqstan (Karakalpakstan)
- Qashqadaryo
- Samarqand (Samarkand)
- Sirdaryo
- Surxondaryo
- Toshkent (available throughout Uzbekistan)
- Xorazm

== Radio channels ==
- Oʻzbekiston
- Yoshlar
- Toshkent
- Mahalla
- O‘zbekiston24
