= Oʻzbekiston (TV channel) =

Uzbek state television channel

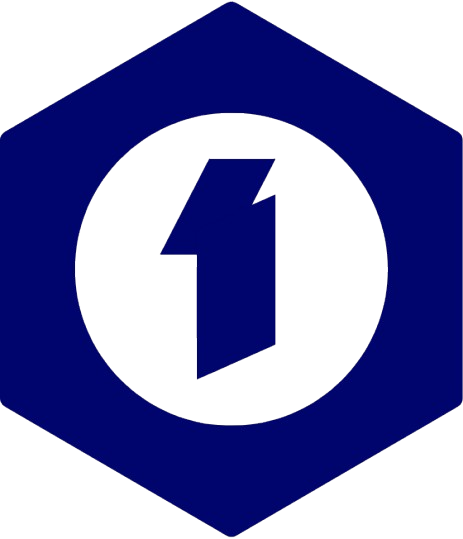
- Country: Uzbekistan
- Headquarters: Tashkent, Uzbekistan

Programming
- Languages: Uzbek; Russian
- Picture format: 16:9 HDTV

Ownership
- Owner: National Television and Radio Company of Uzbekistan
- Sister channels: Yoshlar; Sport; Madaniyat va Ma'rifat; Dunyo Boʻylab; O'zbekistan 24; Kinoteatr; Navo; Bolajon

History
- Launched: 5 November 1956; 69 years ago
- Former names: UzTV-1 (until 2004)

Links
- Website: Official website

Oʻzbekiston ("Uzbekistan") is an Uzbek state television channel and the flagship of the National Television and Radio Company of Uzbekistan. The channel has a general profile.

== History ==
Television broadcasts in the Uzbek SSR began on 5 November 1956; by 1960 it was already broadcasting 3.5 hours a day on weekdays and 5 hours on Sundays (with an additional two-hour slot aimed at children).

The Tashkent television center, operating under the leadership of the Ministry of Communications of the Uzbek SSR, to which the built in the same year, a hardware-studio complex, which had one television studio and one mock-up studio. In 1964, the Khorezm and Nukus television studios were created (both included the main editorial offices of socio-political programs, feature programs, and a program and production department). In 1969, the Tashkent television center was transferred to the State Committee of the Council of Ministers of the Uzbek SSR for Television and Radio Broadcasting and renamed the Republican Television Center, its transmitting part was left within the Ministry of Communications of the Uzbek SSR as the Republican Radio and Television Transmitting Station. In 1970, the Main Editorial Board for the preparation of television films was created (produced television films under the signature “Uzbektelefilm”). In 1977, the Republican Television Center was given a new hardware-studio complex, consisting of 3 hardware-studio blocks, 5 hardware-software blocks, a central hardware room, telecine projection and video recording hardware.

The State Television and Radio Broadcasting Company of Uzbekistan created after independence renamed the existing republican television channel as Uz-TV1 (OʻzTV1); by 1995, the channel was broadcasting two non-continuous periods of broadcasting (daytime and evening). After the conversion of the existing company to the current National Television and Radio Company in 2005, the channel adopted its current name, Oʻzbekiston.

The channel was the most popular in Tashkent, per a survey conducted by the Tashkent Advertisers' Association in early 2009, in the period covering December 2008 and January 2009.

== Programmes ==
=== News ===
- Axborot - Monday - Saturday at 7:30 p.m. (in Russian) and 9:00 p.m. (in Uzbek).
- Tahlilnoma - Weekly news analysis only at Sunday at 7:30 p.m. (in Russian) and 9:00 p.m. (in Uzbek).
- Yilnoma - Annual review of the year, broadcast on New Year's Eve on the usual timeslots of Axborot/Tahlilnoma.
- Munosabat -

== See also ==
- List of Russian-language television channels
- List of television networks in Uzbekistan
