= Gulnara Karimova =

Uzbek diplomat and businesswoman (born 1972)

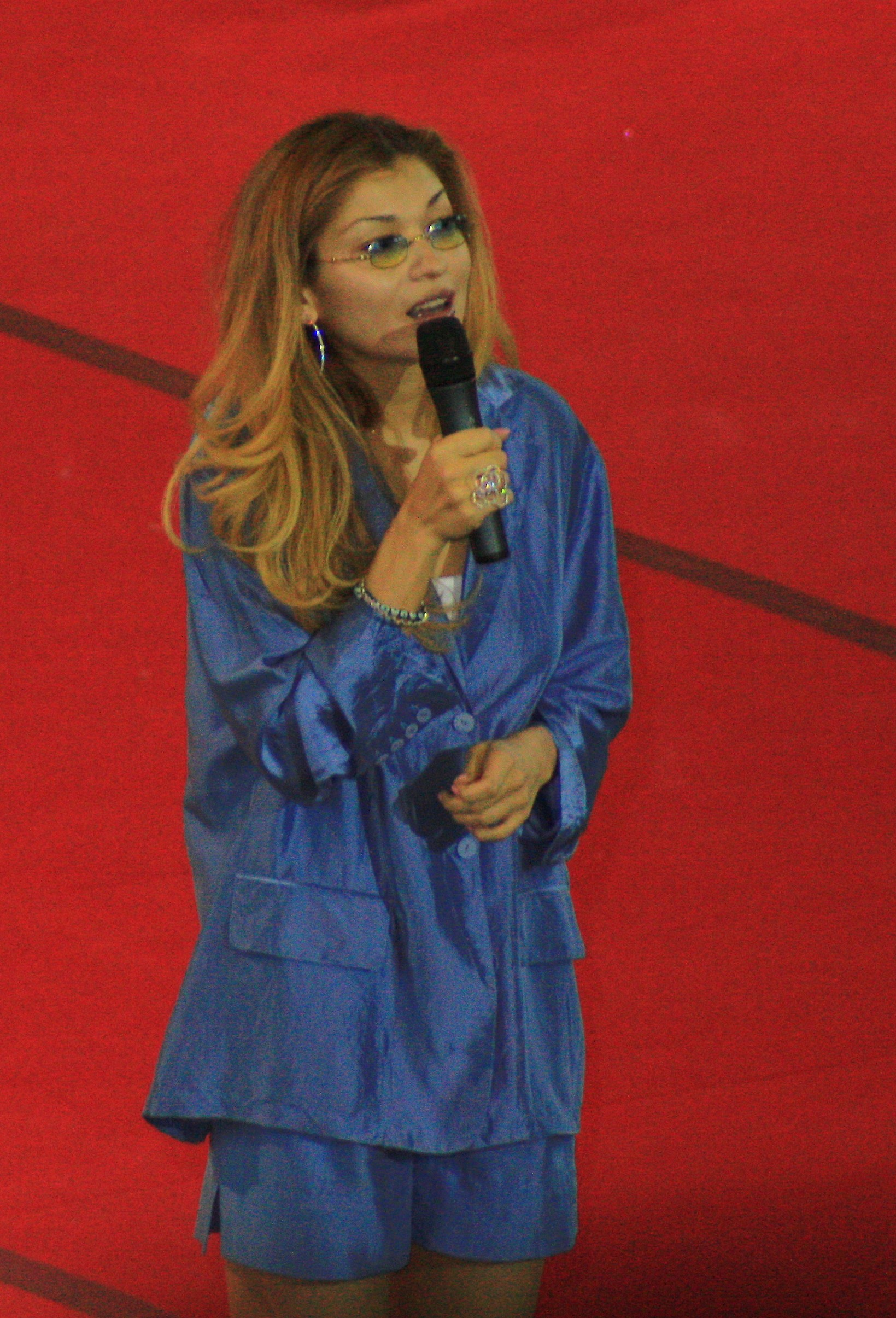
- Karimova in 2009

Permanent Representative of Uzbekistan to the United Nations Office at Geneva
- In office 2008–2017
- President: Islam Karimov
- Succeeded by: Bakhtiyor Ibragimov

Ambassador of Uzbekistan to Spain
- In office January 2010 – July 2012
- President: Islam Karimov
- Succeeded by: Dilshod Akhatov

Personal details
- Born: 8 July 1972 (age 54) Fergana, Uzbek SSR, Soviet Union
- Spouse: Mansur Maqsudi (m. 1991; div. 2003)
- Children: 2
- Parent(s): Islam Karimov; Tatyana Karimova
- Relatives: Lola Karimova-Tillyaeva (sister)
- Education: Tashkent State University; Harvard University

Gulnara Islamovna Karimova (Cyrillic Uzbek: Гулнора Исломовна Каримова; born 8 July 1972) is an Uzbek former businesswoman and the elder daughter of Islam Karimov, the president of Uzbekistan from 1991 to his death in 2016. She wielded considerable influence in Uzbekistan owing to her business dealings and family connections. From 2013, due to a conflict with her father, she rapidly began to lose influence.

Karimova was placed under house arrest in Tashkent, Uzbekistan in November 2014. She was questioned by Swiss prosecutors in December 2016 in a money-laundering investigation. In 2017, the U.S. Department of the Treasury banned United States entities from dealing with Karimova or any of her organisations or associates. In the same year, she was sentenced in Uzbekistan to 10 years in jail for fraud and money laundering. In 2018, the sentence was commuted to five years of house arrest. In March 2019, she was sent to prison for allegedly violating the terms of her house arrest.

== Early life and education ==
Karimova graduated from the Youth Mathematic Academy in Tashkent in 1988. In 1987, she interned at the State Committee of Uzbekistan on Statistics. From 1989 to 1994, she attended Tashkent State University, where she obtained a bachelor's degree from the International Economics department. During her second year, she worked as a translator at the Chamber of Commerce and Industry of the Republic of Uzbekistan. In 1992, she completed a course of jewellery design in New York's Fashion Institute of Technology.

Between 1994 and 1996, she was enrolled at Institute of Economy at the Uzbekistan Academy of Science where she pursued a master's degree. During 1994-1995, she was an intern-teacher at the political science department of the University of World Economy and Diplomacy in Tashkent. Between 1998 and 2000, Karimova studied at Harvard University, where she was awarded a master's degree in regional studies. At the same time, she was enrolled at the University of World Economy and Diplomacy in Tashkent, where in 2001, was "awarded" a PhD in political science. Since 2009, she has held a chair of political science at the UWED. She also holds a Bachelor of Arts in telecommunications which she received in 2006, from Tashkent University of Informational Technologies.

== Career and activities ==
=== Political and diplomatic activities ===
From 1995 to 1996, she worked at the Ministry of Foreign Affairs of Uzbekistan. In 1998, and from 2000 to 2003, Karimova was counselor at Uzbekistan's Mission to the United Nations. From 2003 until 2005, she was minister-counselor at the Uzbek embassy in Moscow, and was adviser to the minister of foreign affairs from 2005 to 2008. In February 2008, she was appointed deputy foreign minister for international cooperation in cultural and humanitarian affairs. In September of the same year, she was named Permanent Representative of Uzbekistan to the United Nations and other international organizations in Geneva, and took up the post in December 2008. In January 2010, she was named Uzbek Ambassador to Spain. In 2012, Karimova was honoured with the "Silk Road and Humanitarian Cooperation" Award of the Shanghai Cooperation Organization.

In 2005, Karimova established the Centre for Political Studies. She is the founder of the Forum of Culture and Arts of Uzbekistan Foundation, and chair of its board of trustees. She has been involved with several other non-governmental organizations in Uzbekistan.

=== Business interests ===
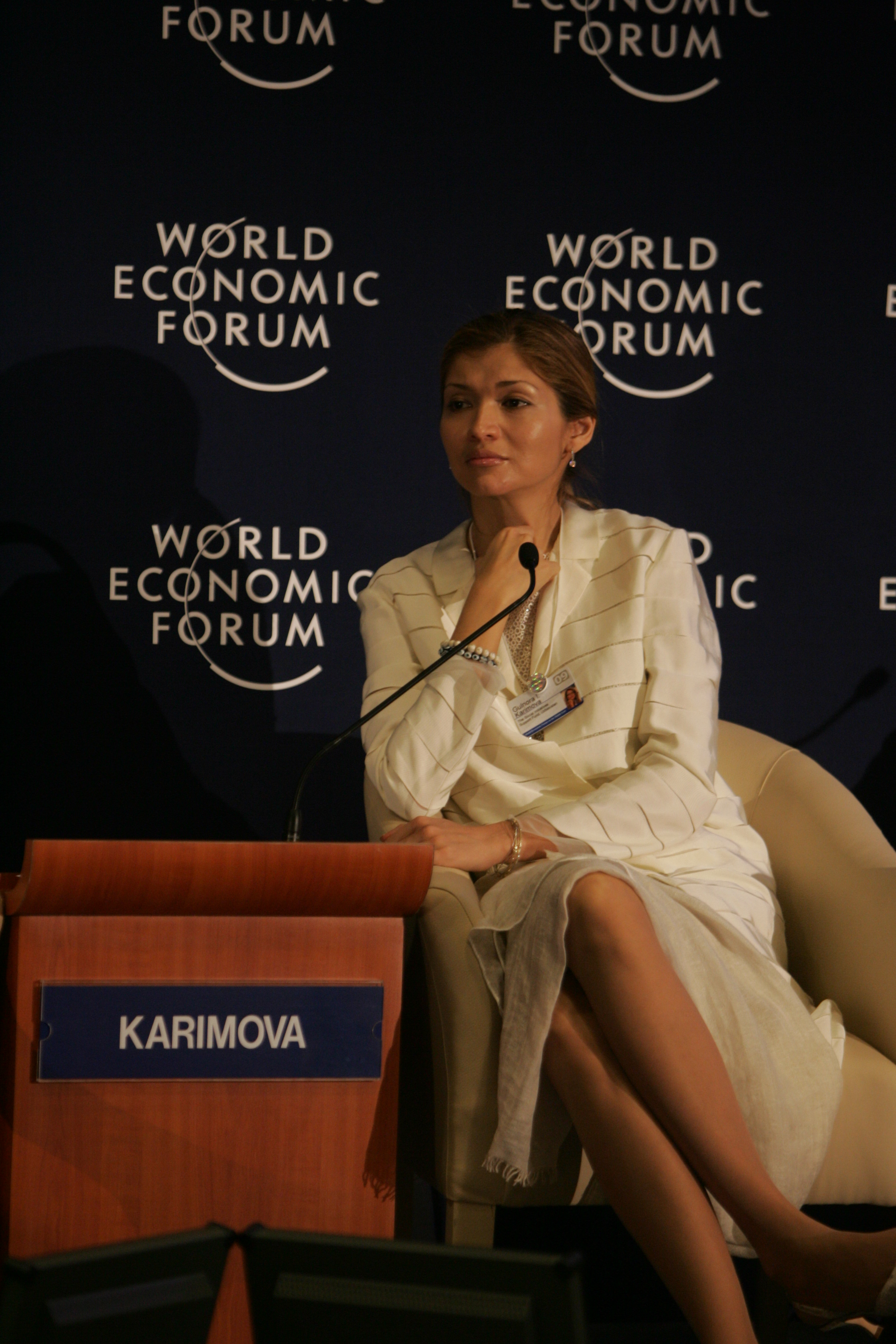
Karimova at the 2009 World Economic Forum in the Middle East

According to US diplomats in Uzbekistan, Karimova "bullied her way into gaining a slice of virtually every lucrative business" in the country and is viewed as a "robber baron". In 2009, the Swiss magazine Bilanz described her as one of the 10 richest women in the country.

In March 2014, the Swiss Prosecutor's Office announced that it had extended a money laundering investigation to include Karimova. The probe was launched in 2012. Karimova denied her involvement in mentioned cases, stating: "I have never considered the opportunities of doing business in Switzerland... These references are insinuations of my opponents. My name has been mentioned earlier several times in relations to companies such as Zeromax in Zug, Interspan, Oxus Gold, Wimm-Bill-Dann of Russia, Carlsberg and many others".

Working though the Kleptocracy Asset Recovery Initiative, the U.S. Department of Justice seized $850 million (~$1.12 billion in 2025) in 2016 that had been "funneled through corrupt deals" by Karimova. She is also under investigation in Uzbekistan on charges of corruption, although she denies any wrongdoing.

Karimova has also been accused of using UK companies to buy real estate around the world with funds she received through bribery and corruption according to a study by Freedom For Eurasia. According to the study, accounting firms acting on behalf of Karimova purchased 14 properties around the world including in the UK, Switzerland, France, Dubai, and Hong Kong.

=== Music ===
In 2006, Karimova released her first music video, singing a song called "Unutma Meni" (Don't Forget Me) under the stage name "Googoosha", apparently her father's nickname for her. She also performed in a later music video, singing a duet of "Besame Mucho" with Julio Iglesias.

In December 2012, Googoosha released a duet with French actor Gérard Depardieu. During his visit to Uzbekistan, the French actor agreed to star in an Uzbek film. Karimova wrote a screenplay for The Theft of the White Cocoon, a story about the origin of the famed Central Asian silk, and set in the 5th and 6th centuries.

Googoosha's first single, "Round Run", was released in April 2012, with various remixes by DJ White Shadow, Razor N Guido of USA and Max Fadeev of Russia. In June 2012, Karimova released her self-titled debut album in the US and other countries on iTunes. The album was also expected to be released in Asia, Russia, and a number of other European countries. However, early reviews by critics panned the debut album, thus indefinitely halting its release in those markets.

=== Poetry ===
In its annual edition of a collection of poems of 2024, the German publishing company Brentano-Gesellschaft in Frankfurt am Main published Gulnara Karimova’s poem “The World is a Flow of Flashes and Glimpses.”

=== Fashion ===
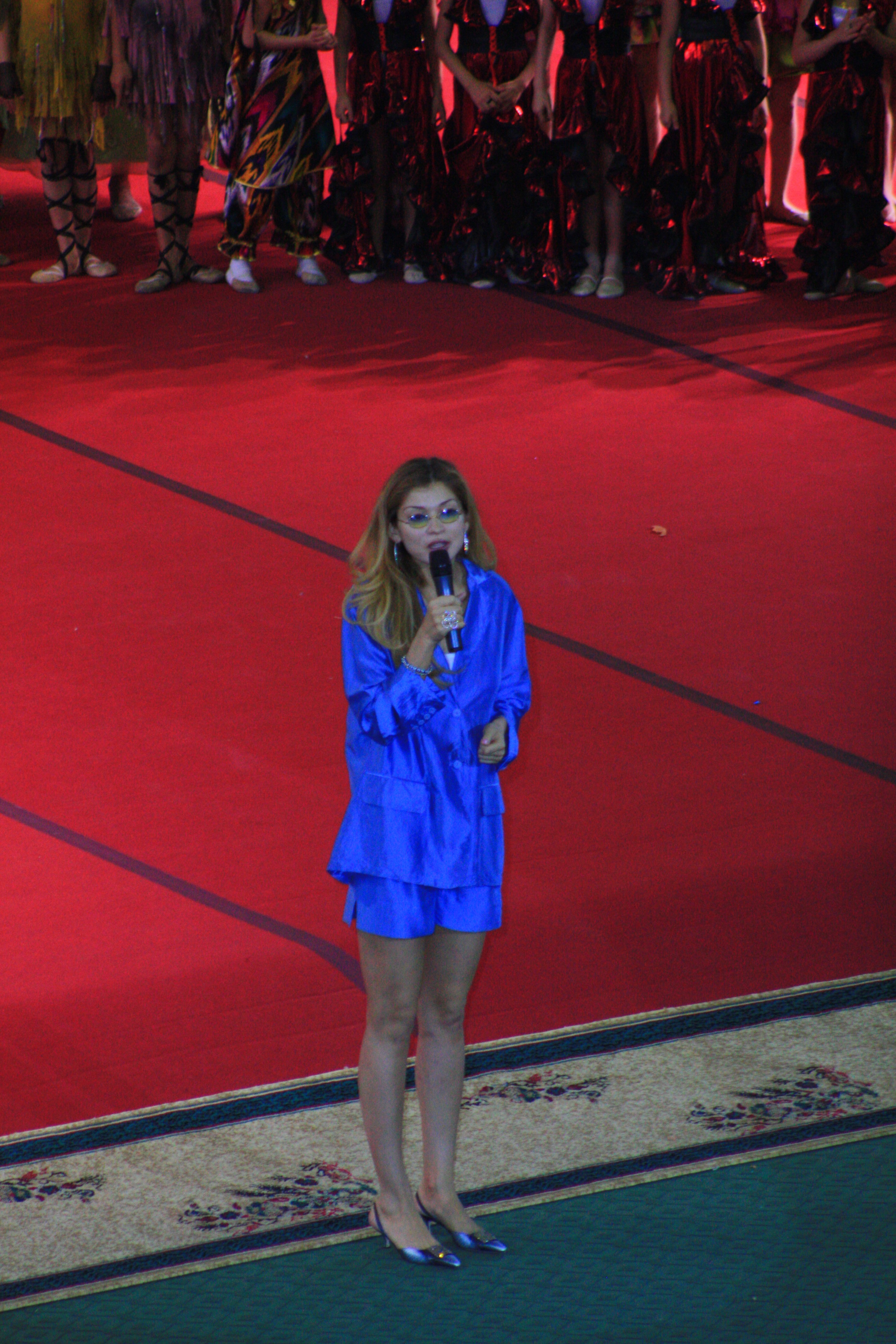
Karimova introducing a gymnastics show at the Universal Sport Palace in Tashkent, Uzbekistan, 2009

In March 2009, Karimova presented her own special jewellery collection "GULI for Chopard", designed for renowned Swiss company Chopard. Reportedly, her royalty for design from sales of the collection would benefit the "Yangi Avlod" (New Generation) Children's Festival. As of June 2016, the festival had yet to receive any money from the sales.

In September 2010, Karimova presented her fashion line, "Guli", featuring Uzbek fabrics and designs based on the traditional Uzbek long coat, at New York's Fashion Week. In September 2011, Karimova's planned spring 2012 fashion show at New York's Fashion Week was cancelled after Human Rights Watch and other organizations drew attention to her connection to her father's government and its record on torture, and child and forced labour. According to Human Rights Watch, up to two million Uzbek children are forced to leave school each year for two months to pick cotton – a fabric woven throughout Karimova's designs. However, the fashion show was eventually held in New York, with the location changed to Cipriani.

In Uzbekistan, Karimova also hosted Style.uz Art Week, featuring catwalk shows of international labels such as Cavalli, Scervino and Chopard. Art Week also included Theatre.uz International Theatre Festival, Golden Guepard Tashkent International Film Forum, and Biennale and Photobiennale exhibitions, as well as master-classes, round tables, concerts and charity events.

Karimova presented her first fragrances, Victorious for men and Mysterieuse for women, on 8 October, as part of Style.Uz Art Week 2012. The fragrances were created by French perfumer Bertrand Duchaufour. Halit Ergenç became a face of Victorious for men.

Karimova served as editor-in-chief of L'Officiel Central Asia from 2010 to 2014.

=== Cinema against AIDS ===
In May 2010, Karimova was at the center of a scandal surrounding her attendance of the annual "Cinema Against AIDS" gala fundraising event organised by amfAR, The Foundation for AIDS Research during the Cannes Film Festival. AmfAR faced criticism from NGOs such as Reporters without Borders, with claims that it would be hypocritical for AmfAR to accept the attendance of Karimova given her country's refusal to take AIDS treatment seriously. Just months before the Cinema Against AIDS dinner, a 27-year-old AIDS activist, Maksim Popov, had been sentenced by an Uzbek court to seven years in prison for distributing information to stop the spread of HIV-AIDS. The Uzbek court deemed the information to be against society's moral standards.

== Personal life ==
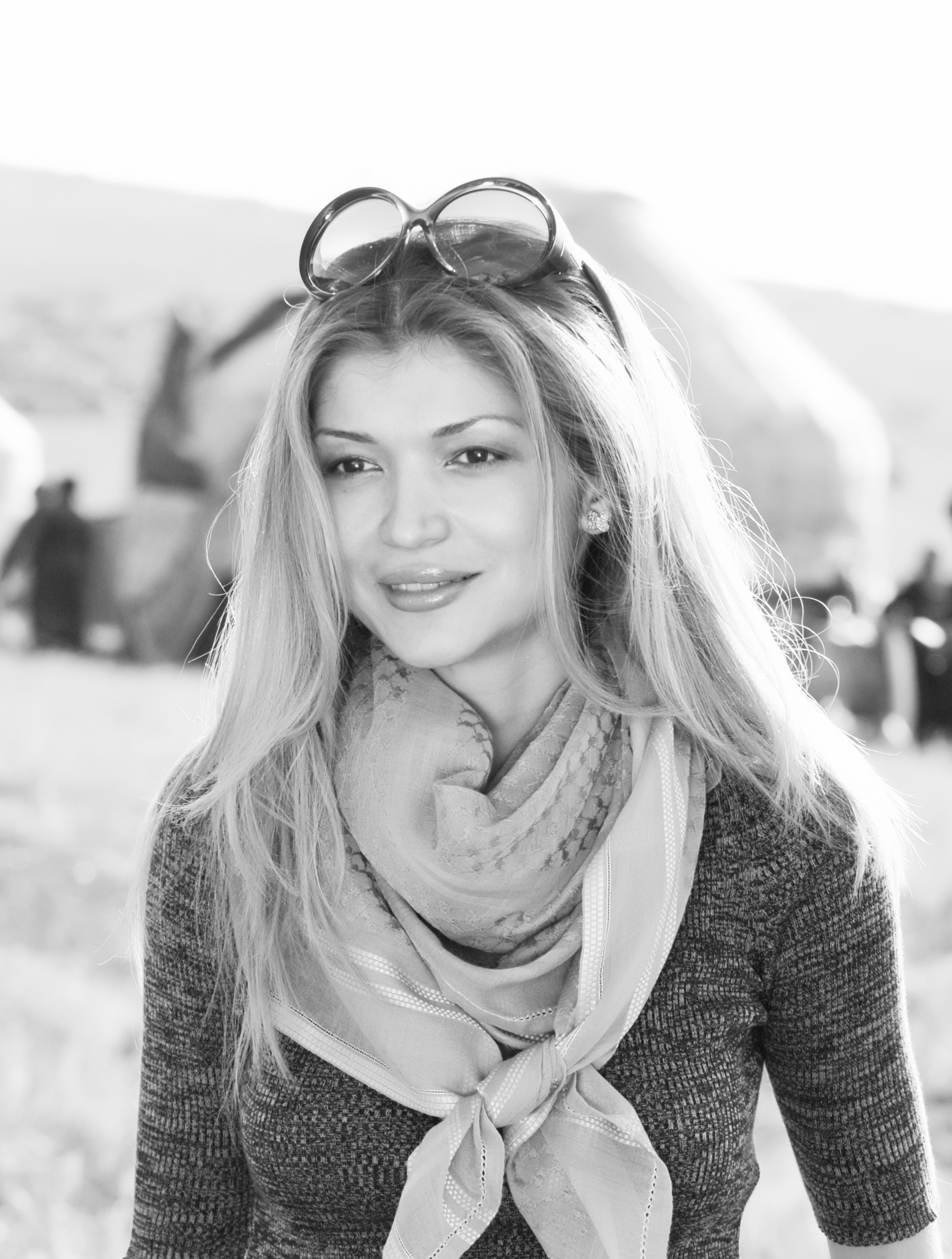
Karimova in 2009

=== Marriage and divorce ===
In 1991, Karimova married Mansur Maqsudi, an American businessman of Afghani-Uzbek origin. They have two children, a son, Islam Karimov Jr., born in 1992, and a daughter, Iman Karimova, born in 1998. When the marriage started to crumble in July 2001, Karimova took the children and left the United States for Uzbekistan. An Uzbek judge granted her a divorce, while a US court granted one to Maqsudi. When Karimova refused to accede to the US court ruling awarding custody of the two children to Maqsudi, an international arrest warrant in her name was filed with Interpol. In return, Maqsudi faced arrest in Uzbekistan, and some of his relatives were arrested and imprisoned. Others were driven to the Uzbek-Afghan border and released in Afghan territory, and Maqsudi had his business assets in Uzbekistan, particularly his interest in a joint-venture with Coca-Cola, taken away. According to The Guardian, as part of her divorce settlement, Karimova kept $4.5 million worth of jewellery and business interests worth approximately $60 million. On 9 July 2008, custody of the two children was fully given to Karimova, by a consent order signed by Judge Deanne M. Wilson (Superior Court of the State of New Jersey).

=== Rumours of marriage to Sodiq Safoyev ===
In 2003, when Sodiq Safoyev was the Minister of Foreign Affairs of Uzbekistan, rumours about his marriage to Karimova surfaced in local and international media. Safoyev, a career diplomat and a divorcee as of 2001, was hinted to have been picked by President Islam Karimov as his possible replacement, hence the marriage to his daughter. However, the allegations were denied by the Ministry of Foreign Affairs, and the BBC, which published the story, was accused by First Deputy Minister Vladimir Norov of intruding into the personal lives of Safoyev and Karimova.

=== Alleged house arrest and rumoured death ===
In 2014, the BBC reported, based on a letter and a voice recording from Karimova (received in March and August 2014, respectively), that she was under house arrest.

On 22 November 2016, the Central Asian news portal Centre1 claimed that Karimova had died on 5 November 2016 after being poisoned, and was buried in an unmarked grave in the Minor cemetery in Tashkent. According to RIA Novosti, sources close to the family disputed the claim that she was dead, but did not provide any proof as to her current status or whereabouts.

In December 2016, Karimova's son, Islam Karimov Junior, called for his mother's whereabouts to be revealed by Uzbekistan. He said that she was being kept against her will "without any even basic human rights that every person deserves on this Earth". He explained that, now living in London, he could not go back to Uzbekistan due to his fear that he would not be allowed to return, which was also why he did not attend the funeral of his grandfather, who was initially responsible for putting Karimova under house arrest.

In January 2017, The Wall Street Journal reported that Karimova had been questioned by Swiss prosecutors in December 2016 regarding accusations of money-laundering. At the time, she was being kept under house arrest. In 2015, an investigation by the Organized Crime and Corruption Reporting Project reported that Karimova had taken over US$1 billion in bribes from Scandinavian and Russian telecom companies wanting involvement in the Uzbek market. In 2016, the United States Department of Justice alleged that Karimova had fraudulently received $800 million (~$1.05 billion in 2025), and that some of it had been through ABLV Bank and Parex Bank for companies linked to her by three telecommunications operators in Uzbekistan. Prosecutors accused her of being part of a criminal group that controlled assets of more than $1bn (£760m) in 12 countries, including the UK, Russia and United Arab Emirates, considering the Karimova case to be "one of the largest bribery and corruption cases of all time". In 2016, the U.S. Department of Justice seized $850 million that had been funneled through corrupt deals by Karimova. Karimova was also under investigation in Uzbekistan on charges of corruption, although she denied any wrongdoing.

== Conviction ==
On 28 July 2017, the Uzbek Prosecutor-General's Office released a statement saying that Karimova was in custody following a 2015 conviction, and faced additional charges in an ongoing investigation, marking the first time authorities had revealed details about her. The statement also said she was a member of an organised criminal group that controlled assets worth more than $1.3 billion in 12 countries, including properties in London worth £22.9 million, and hotels in Dubai worth $67.4 million. She was alleged to have acquired $595 million worth of assets and received $869.3 million in kickbacks that were paid into offshore accounts.

On 18 December 2017, Karimova was sentenced to 10 years in jail for fraud and money laundering, but that was commuted in 2018 to five years of house arrest. On 5 March 2019, she was sent to prison for allegedly violating the terms of her house arrest. On 18 March 2020, Karimova received an additional 13-year sentence after being found guilty of extortion, money laundering, and other crimes.

In 2026, a court in Switzerland abandoned a trial against Karimova on corruption charges, citing her continued house arrest and inability to take part in the trial.
