= Nasrullo Sayidov =

Uzbek politician and dissident

Nasrullo Sayyid
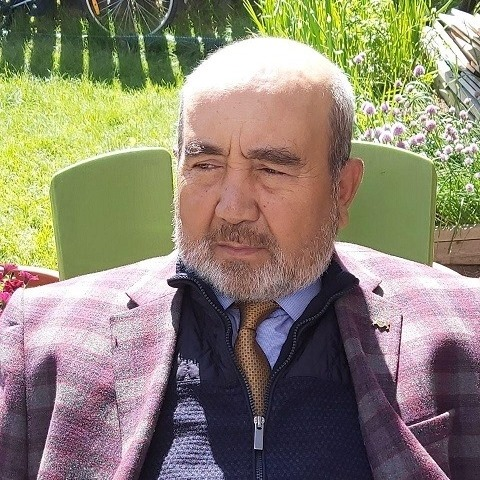
- Born: February 20, 1958 (age 68); Vabkent, Bukhara region, Uzbekistan
- Occupations: Engineer, Architect
- Political party: Erk Democratic Party (1990-present)

Nasrullo Sayidov (Nasrullo Sayyid) (born 20 February 1958) is an Uzbek politician and dissident. He is a former member of Uzbek Parliament (1990-1993). As a dissident, he has worked as an author, a publicist and one of the leaders of opposition party "Erk", head of the Bukhara Region branch. He is one of the pioneer activists who initiated the acceptance of the Declaration of Independence of Uzbekistan.

== Biography ==
Nasrullo Sayyid (Nasrullo Sayidov) was born on February 20, 1958, in the village of Burqut in Vabkent district of Bukhara region of the Republic of Uzbekistan of the former USSR. He is married and has 5 children (2 boys and 3 girls). His father Abdullo Sayidov and mother Farogat Ahmedova had ten children in the family, and Nasrullo was the second child.

In 1975, after graduating from high school in his village, he went to study at the Institute of Architecture and Construction in Samarkand. After graduating as a civil engineer in 1980, he joined Construction Company No. 3 (SMU-3) in Uchkuduk.

In the spring of 1982, he married his classmate Muqaddas Yarova and was soon sent to serve in the Soviet Army. In 1982-83 he served in a number of military units in the Byelorussian SSR and returned home as a tank commander. After military service, he specialized in construction supervision for the Vabkent district administration (then The Executive Committee).

During 1986, he improved his skills at the newly opened Higher School of Agro-Industrial Complex Management in Tashkent. From 1987 to February 1994, Nasrullo Sayidov worked at the PMK-199 construction company, at first as an engineer and then as a chief manager.

In the Soviet Socialist Republic of Uzbekistan, parliamentary (Oliy Majlis) elections were held on February 19, 1990. Workers of the construction company, who were headed by him (PMK-199) nominated him as a People's Deputy of the Republic of Uzbekistan. He won the alternative election.

== Political activity ==
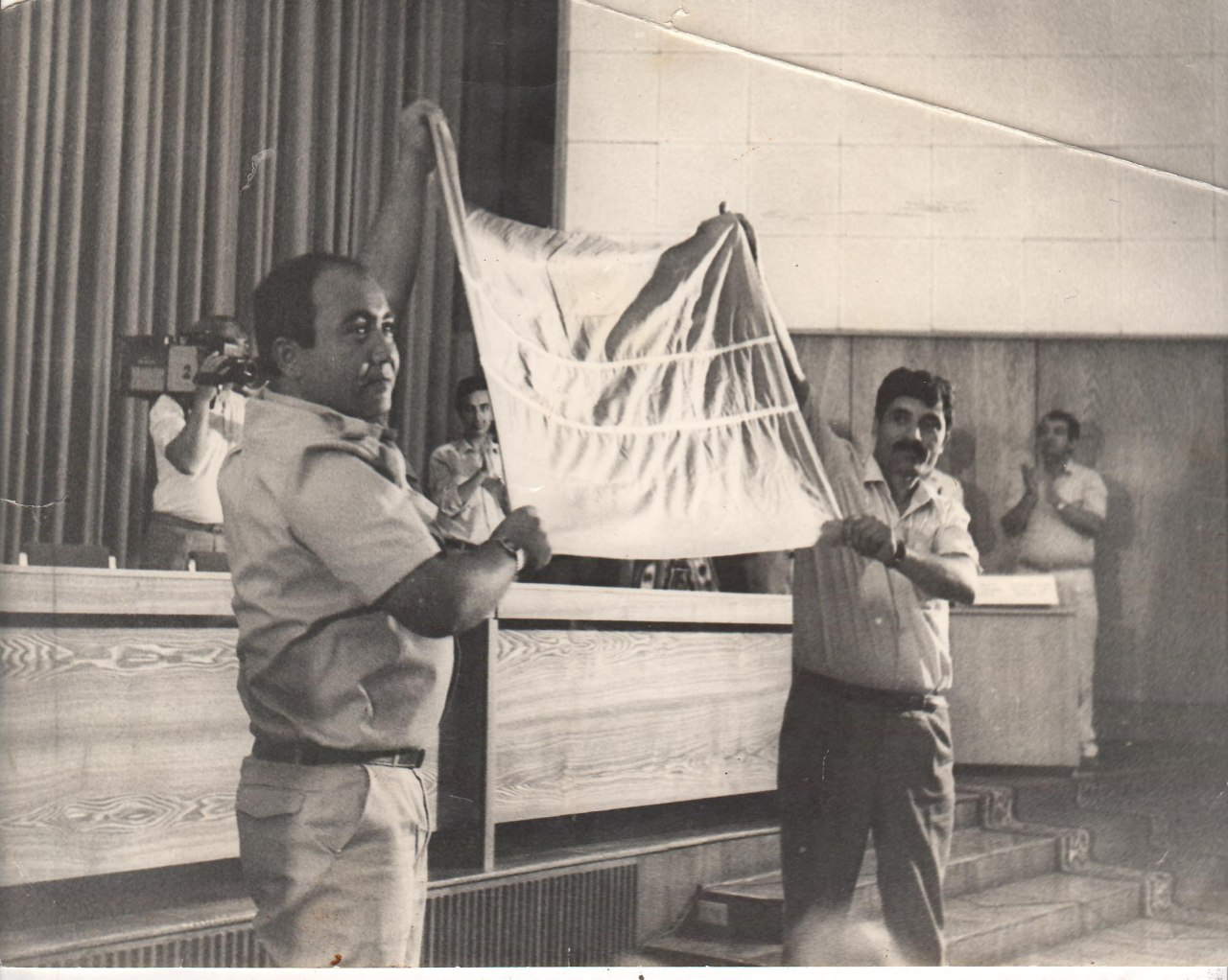
Announcing the Declaration of Independence in the Oliy Kengash (Parliament) of Uzbekistan on June 20, 1990 (MPs holding the flag are Nasrullo Sayyid (left) and Imom Fayzi (right)).

Nasrullo Sayidov had long been involved in the growing struggle for independence and freedom among Uzbek intellectuals. That struggle had begun to move into large political arenas without being half-hidden. He took an active part in the 1988-89 popular protests demanding the state status of the Uzbek language.

After the first constituent session of the Oliy Majlis, a group of democratically elected deputies began to think about Uzbekistan's secession from the USSR. On April 30, 1990, the Erk Democratic Party was established and Nasrullo Sayyid became a member of it. The goal of this party was to bring Uzbekistan to independence.

On June 19, 1990, the Erk parliamentary faction, led by Muhammad Salih, submitted the Declaration of Independence of Uzbekistan to the Oliy Majlis, demanding its immediate adoption. Other 50-60 deputies joined the movement.

After a heated debate, on June 20, 1990, the Oliy Majlis (Parliament) of Uzbekistan adopted the Declaration of Independence. Nasrullo Sayyid brought the Uzbek flag to the session hall, came to the podium and shouted "Long live Independence". The audience stood up and applauded him.

The Erk party participated in the presidential election in December 1991. Islam Karimov, who was the leader of the Communist deputies, formed the majority in parliament, falsified the election results and became president. He began to take revenge on the democrat and liberals who opposed him.

In December 1993, Nasrullo Saidov was expelled from the Oliy Majlis for being the leader of the Erk party in the Bukhara region and for his political views. He was arrested on February 22, 1994. He was falsely accused of keeping a combat grenade in the children’s room of his home. Although, his guilt had not been proven, the court sentenced him to one year in prison.

From 1996 to 2005, he worked under strict state control, but did not retreat from his political path. He built many buildings through the Nemo construction company he headed. In May 2005, peaceful protesters opened fire in Andijan. Repression in the country was intensifying at that time. Nasrullo Sayyid had been re-investigated for leaking audio recordings of Hafiz Dadahon Hasanov, who sang about the Andijan events. It became clear that the National Security Service was trying to imprison him for many years on both false and ridiculous charges. In November 2005, he was forced to leave Uzbekistan.

He lived in Kyrgyzstan from November 2005 to July 2007 and published hundreds of articles and poems against the dictatorship in Uzbekistan. In July 2007, he moved to Canada to seek political asylum. While Nasrullo Sayyid was living in Canada, a fake criminal case was opened against him in Uzbekistan and he was wanted. He flew to Tashkent in April 2019 and tried to prove his innocence. But he was sent back from the airport without being allowed into his homeland.

== Books ==
Nasrullo Sayyid has written many articles on building a democratic civil society in Uzbekistan. His book "Suspicious People" was published in 2019 in Istanbul in Uzbek.

- His work "The Sorrow of the Nation" was translated into Turkish and published in the summer of 2020 in Ankara in the form of a book in two languages (Uzbek and Turkish).
- MILLETIN IZDIRABI (turkish)
- SHUBHALI ODAMLAR (uzbek)
- МИЛЛАТ ҚАЙҒУСИ (uzbek)
