= 1992 Tashkent student protests =

Student protests in Tashkent

- Tashkent (red) within Uzbekistan
- Date: 16-17 January 1992
- Location: Tashkent, Uzbekistan
- Caused by: Increase of food prices due to rationing and delay of scholarships
- Methods: Demonstrations and civil unrest
- Result: Riots suppressed, expulsion of non-resident students from Tashkent

Parties
Students, primarily from the National University of Uzbekistan	Government of Uzbekistan: National Security Service; Ministry of the Interior; Tashkent Police

Lead figures
Muhammad Salih; Abdumannob Polat	Islam Karimov (President of Uzbekistan); Buritosh Mustafayev (Prosecutor General); Atkhambek Fazylbekov (Mayor of Tashkent)

Casualties
- Deaths: 2
- Injuries: 10

The 1992 Tashkent student protests were mass protests from 16-17 January 1992 against the Government of Uzbekistan. The government was criticized for its increase of food prices due to rationing and for the delay of scholarships. The protestors, mainly led by university students from National University of Uzbekistan, attempted to reverse this.

== Background ==
On 2 January 1992, Boris Yeltsin freed prices to spur production and help create a market economy, which prompted Uzbekistan to take similar actions. On 16 January 1992, the Uzbek government introduced a law implementing a free-market pricing system, which eliminated previous price controls for some staple foods like bread and they also introduced food coupons for rationing.

== Protests ==
The same night as the new law, around 10,000 students marched to the palace of the former president of Uzbekistan after smashing food store fronts that they stated displayed goods that were now unaffordable. The police of Tashkent then fired blanks in the air, but eventually started opening fire and beat students with clubs and chasing them back to the University Town of the National University of Uzbekistan. During the fight, 2 students were killed and 10 of the protestors were injured. At least 100 of the students were arrested. Vilor Niyazmatov, the Chairman of the Committee on State and Public Security, disputed this, stating that the police did not fire on the protestors despite the deaths.

On 18 January the non-resident students at the university were sent home, and classes were suspended until 10 February. On 20 January the Uzbek government blamed the protests on "political provocateurs", and said the protestors were trying to discredit the newly-formed nation by taking advantage of the delay in paying stipends and the bread shortage.

== See also ==
- Student protest
