= People's Movement of Uzbekistan =

People's Movement of Uzbekistan Oʻzbekiston xalq harakati
- Abbreviation: OʻXH / ÖHH / НДУ
- Leader: Muhammad Salih
- Founded: May 2010 or Summer 2011
- Headquarters: Istanbul, Turkey
- Newspaper: Erk
- Ideology: Uzbek nationalism National democracy Liberal conservatism Secularism
- Political position: Centre-right to right-wing
- Member parties: Erk Democratic Party
- Slogan: «Only those people who are ready to die for Her are worthy of Freedom!» (Uzbek: «U uchun o'lishga tayyor bo'lganlargina Ozodlikka loyiqdirlar!»)
- Legislative Chamber: 0 / 150

Website
- uzxalqharakati.com

The People's Movement of Uzbekistan (Uzbek: Oʻzbekiston xalq harakati) is an unregistered opposition political movement founded in 2011 by the Uzbek opposition leader and dissident Muhammad Salih, who is also the leader of the Erk Democratic Party, now living in Turkey.

The movement was founded according to some sources in May 2010 in Berlin, according to others, in the summer of 2011 in Istanbul, initially as a coalition of the Erk Democratic Party, the organization "Andijan - Justice and Progress" and the group "Tayanch". The movement has held and continues to hold its congresses in Istanbul, Prague, Warsaw, Düsseldorf and other European cities. In July 2011, the movement opened a branch in the United States for its members and supporters in that country. On September 1, 2011, on the day of the next anniversary of Uzbekistan's independence, the movement held protests in Istanbul against the authorities of Uzbekistan. In March 2012, the movement called on taxi drivers in Uzbekistan to unite in mobile groups and start protests across the country.

After reports of emergency hospitalization of President of Uzbekistan Islam Karimov appeared, on August 28, the official website of the People's Movement of Uzbekistan published information according to which Islam Karimov organized a reception and a banquet on August 26 at his country residence Durmen on the occasion of an unprecedented number of medals of Uzbek athletes won at the 2016 Summer Olympics and a record 21st place in the final team event, in which Uzbekistan was ahead of countries such as Kazakhstan and Ukraine. The report said that President Islam Karimov began "drinking vodka and other alcoholic beverages beyond measure," without even listening to the warnings of his subordinates, and because of this, the president fainted at ten in the evening and the doctors who arrived in time suggested a heart attack, and they were already in the hospital. the diagnosis was confirmed.

In January 2018, the movement announced the extraction of a list of over 700 employees of the SGB of Uzbekistan involved in the fight against dissidents during the rule of Islam Karimov. Some members of the movement were sentenced in Uzbekistan to various prison terms.

There are many critics of the movement, not only from the Uzbek government, but also among some Uzbek opposition figures and independent experts. Several hacker attacks were carried out on the official website of the movement, and each time the movement blamed the Uzbek authorities for this.
