= Linda S. Goldberg =

Economist

Linda S. Goldberg is an economist and a financial research advisor in Financial Intermediation at the Federal Reserve Bank of New York. She previously served there as a senior vice president and as head of Global Economic Analysis and of International Research. She holds a Doctor of Philosophy and Master of Arts from Princeton University and a Bachelor of Arts in Mathematics and Economics from Queens College of the City University of New York.

She is a Faculty Research Fellow at the National Bureau of Economic Research. Goldberg is a co-director of the International Banking Research Network (IBRN) and an officer at the Central Banking Economic Research Association. She has served as co-editor of the International Journal of Central Banking and on the editorial boards of the Journal of Financial Intermediation and the Journal of Financial Services Research.

== Research ==
Her research mainly focuses on international macroeconomics, international banking and Finance and the International Role of the Dollar. Her works received more than 21000 citations and she is the 574th most cited economist in the world according to IDEAS. She has published in the Journal of International Economics, Review of Economics and Statistics, and has numerous NBER working papers with over 500 citations. Her research has been quoted by Reuters, Slate, and Bilan.

== Selected bibliography ==
- Goldberg, Linda S.; Tille, Cédric (2008-12-01). "Vehicle currency use in international trade". Journal of International Economics. 76 (2): pages 177–192.
- Campa, José Manuel; Goldberg, Linda S. (2005-11-01). "Exchange Rate Pass-Through into Import Prices". The Review of Economics and Statistics. 87 (4): pages 679–690.
- Campa, Jose; Goldberg, Linda S (1997–02). "The Evolving External Orientation of Manufacturing Industries: Evidence from Four Countries", NBER working paper.
