= Timur Tillyaev =

Uzbek businessman

- Born: 1980 (age 45–46); Tashkent, Uzbekistan
- Occupation: Businessman
- Known for: Founder of Abu Saxiy market
- Spouse: Lola Karimova-Tillyaeva (div. 2025)
- Children: 3

Timur Tillyaev is an Uzbek businessman. He is known as the founder of Abu Saxiy market, the largest commercial and wholesale market in Uzbekistan.

== Career ==
Tillyaev is the founder of Abu Saxiy market, near Tashkent, which is Uzbekistan's largest commercial and wholesale market. The market started with 680 empty shipping containers, which were converted into the market's first stalls selling textiles. Abu Saxiy expanded to 3,000 stalls and shops across 167,000 square meters. The market attracts approximately 10,000 visitors daily and employs around 5,000 people. Tillyaev sold Abu Saxiy in 2017.

Tillyaev continues to invest in the logistics sector worldwide, focusing on areas such as food distribution, as well as healthcare, green finance and renewable energy.

== Philanthropy ==
Tillyaev co-founded the You Are Not Alone Foundation in 2002 with his ex-wife, Lola Karimova-Tillyaeva, a charity for underprivileged children in Uzbekistan.

He worked on projects promoting Uzbekistan's cultural heritage, producing the documentary film Ulugh Beg – The Man Who Unlocked the Universe in 2017, which detailed the life of the influential 15th-century Uzbek astronomer and politician.
