= 1995 Uzbek presidential term referendum =

26 March 1995
- Extension of the term of the President until 2000

Results
Choice	Votes	%
Yes	11,199,415	99.64%
No	40,617	0.36%
Valid votes	11,240,032	99.96%
Invalid or blank votes	4,996	0.04%
Total votes	11,245,028	100.00%
Registered voters/turnout	11,319,447	99.34%

A referendum on extending President Islam Karimov's term was held in Uzbekistan on 26 March 1995. The proposal would see Karimov remain in office until 2000. It was approved by 99.6% of voters, with a 99% turnout. The referendum was held a few months before Karimov's current term was due to expire, as he had been elected in December 1991.

== Conduct ==
The United States criticized the referendum for its "lack of public debate", and noted several cases where one person cast votes for their entire family. At the time, Karimov publicly stated that he considered the referendum to be the equivalent of re-election for a second term, which under the Constitution would have required him to leave office in 2000. However, the legislature passed a resolution opposing the decision, leading Karimov to announce he would run for re-election in 2000.

== Results ==
Choice	Votes	%
For	11,199,415	99.64
Against	40,617	0.36
Total	11,240,032	100.00
Valid votes	11,240,032	99.96
Invalid/blank votes	4,996	0.04
Total votes	11,245,028	100.00
Registered voters/turnout	11,319,447	99.34
Source: Nohlen et al., Direct Democracy
