= First ladies of Uzbekistan =

First Lady of Uzbekistan
- Oʻzbekistonning birinchi xonimlari

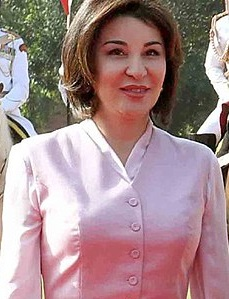
- Incumbent; Ziroat Mirziyoyeva since December 14, 2016
- Inaugural holder: Tatyana Karimova
- Formation: September 1, 1991

First Lady of Uzbekistan (Uzbek: Oʻzbekistonning birinchi xonimlari) is the title attributed to the wife of the president of Uzbekistan. The current first lady of Uzbekistan is Ziroat Mirziyoyeva, wife of President Shavkat Mirziyoyev.

== First ladies of Uzbekistan ==
No.	Image	Name (Birth-Death)	Term in office			President (Birth-Death)	Note
No.	Image	Name (Birth-Death)	Term start	Term end	Time in office	President (Birth-Death)	Note
1		Tatyana Karimova (born 1948)	1 September 1991	2 September 2016	25 years, 1 day	Islam Karimov (1938-2016)	
Vacant; Nigmatilla Yuldashev never married			2 September 2016	14 December 2016	103 days	Nigmatilla Yuldashev (born 1962)	
2		Ziroat Mirziyoyeva (born 1957)	14 December 2016	Incumbent	9 years, 308 days	Shavkat Mirziyoyev (born 1957)	

== See also ==
- President of Uzbekistan
