= Tatyana Karimova =

Tajik-Russian economist (born 1948)

- Татьяна Каримова
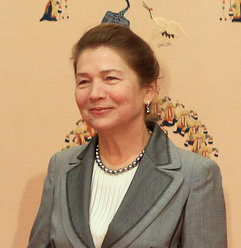
- Karimova in February 2010

First Lady of Uzbekistan
- In role 1 September 1991 – 2 September 2016
- President: Islam Karimov
- Preceded by: Position created
- Succeeded by: Ziroat Mirziyoyeva

Personal details
- Born: 26 August 1948 (age 78) Khabarovsk, Russian SFSR, Soviet Union
- Spouse: Islam Karimov (m. 1967; died 2016)
- Children: Gulnara • Lola
- Profession: Economist

Tatyana Akbarovna Karimova (Russian: Татьяна Акбаровна Каримова) (born 26 August 1948) is an Uzbek economist who held the position of First Lady of Uzbekistan from 1991 until the death of her husband in September 2016.

The widow of former President Islam Karimov, she was a highly influential figure throughout her husband's rule. Karimova, together with Rustam Inoyatov, the head of the National Security Service, was expected to play a key role in choosing Karimov's successor.

== Early life and family ==
Born in the harsh years following World War II into a military family, Karimova, who is of Jewish and Tajik origin, moved with her parents to the Fergana Region in 1952. Her family has been described as influential. She has a younger sister, Tamara Sobirova. Tatyana worked as a researcher at the Institute of Economics of the Academy of Sciences of Uzbekistan.

== Biography ==
Islam Karimov was previously married to his first wife, Natalya Petrovna Kuchmi, from 1964 until their divorce during the mid-1960s. In 1967, he married Tatyana Akbarovna. Tatyana Karimova was working as a researcher at the Institute of Economics at the Academy of Sciences of Uzbekistan at the time of her wedding to Karimov. They had two daughters, Gulnara Karimova (born 1972) and Lola Karimova-Tillyaeva (born 1978). Additionally, they shared five grandchildren: (Islam Karimova Jr., Iman Karimova, Mariam Tillyaeva, Umar Tillyaev, Safiya Tillyaeva).

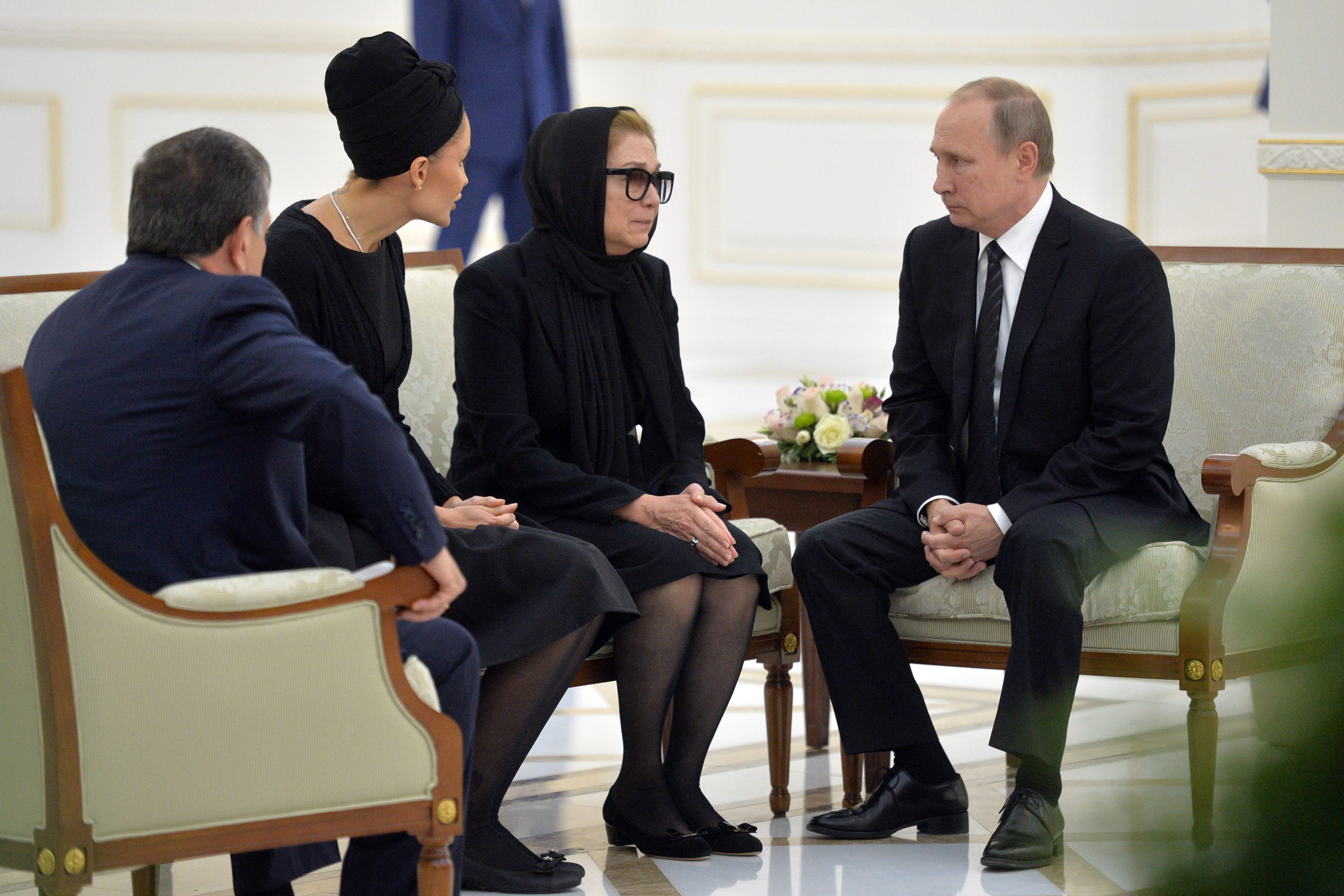
Tatyana Karimova, accompanied by her daughter Lola and PM Mirziyoyev, met Russian President Vladimir Putin in Samarkand on 6 September 2016, 4 days after the death of her husband.

In 2013, a feud between Tatyana Karimova and her elder daughter, Gulnara Karimova, spilled onto Twitter. Gulnara Karimova accused her mother of trying to "destroy" for attempting to prevent the arrest of her cousin, Akbarali Abdullayev. She also accused her younger sister, Lola Karimova-Tillyaeva, of sorcery. Gulnara Karimova's Twitter account was suspended shortly after the accusations and she is believed to have been placed under house arrest in 2014.

Karimova served as the first First Lady of Uzbekistan from the country's independence until Islam Karimov's death in 2016. She was known to engage in charity work and official state functions. However, she was a highly influential advisor on many of her husband's policies.

Tatyana Karimova was expected to be a key figure in choosing her husband's successor in 2016 without being expected to seek the presidency herself. She was seen as an ally of Rustam Inoyatov, the head of the National Security Service, who was also seen as likely help choose Uzbekistan's next president. Prime Minister Shavkat Mirziyoyev was subsequently elected president in elections held in December 2016.

== See also ==
- Media related to Tatyana Karimova at Wikimedia Commons
