= Lola Karimova-Tillyaeva =

Uzbek diplomat (born 1978)

Lola Karimova-Tillyaeva Лола Каримова-Тилляева
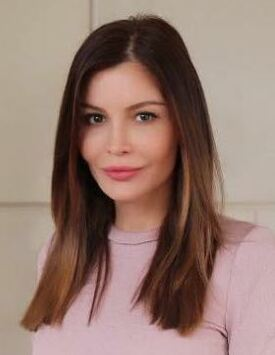
- Karimova-Tillyaeva in 2019

Permanent Representative of Uzbekistan to UNESCO
- In office 2007–2018

Personal details
- Born: Lola Islamovna Karimova; 3 July 1978 (age 48) Tashkent, Uzbek SSR, Soviet Union
- Children: 3
- Parent(s): Islam Karimov; Tatyana Karimova
- Relatives: Gulnara Karimova (sister)
- Education: University of World Economy and Diplomacy
- Website: www.lolakarimova.com

Lola Karimova-Tillyaeva (born 3 July 1978), also known as Lola Tillyaeva, is an entrepreneur, philanthropist, and former Uzbek diplomat. She is the younger daughter of Islam Karimov, the former president of Uzbekistan, and his wife, Tatyana Akbarovna Karimova. She previously served as Uzbekistan's permanent delegate to UNESCO from 2008 to 2018. She is also the founder of The Harmonist, a luxury fragrance house launched in Paris in 2013.

== Early life and education ==
Lola Islamovna Karimova-Tillyaeva was born July 3, 1978 to Islam Karimov and his wife, Tatyana Akbarovna Karimova. When she was eleven years of age her father became the President of Uzbekistan. Her older sister is Gulnara Karimova, an Uzbek diplomat and business mogul. Karimova-Tillyaeva earned her bachelor's and master's degrees in International Law from the University of World Economy and Diplomacy in Tashkent, and later received a doctorate degree in Psychology from Tashkent State University.

== Career ==
In January 2008, Karimova-Tillyaeva was appointed as Uzbekistan's Permanent Delegate to UNESCO. She held the position for a decade until 2018.

In 2011, the Tillyaev family launched a complaint against Bilan, after it included them onto the list of Switzerland's 300 richest residents and reported that the Karimova sisters’ combined fortune totalled $1 billion.

Karimova-Tillyaeva owns property in Switzerland and in 2012 made Bilan magazine's list of Switzerland's 300 richest residents.

In an interview with the BBC published in September 2013, Lola Karimova-Tillyaeva said she was surprised to see the 2011 figures published by Bilan regarding her wealth. She said that the figures suggested by the press were "far from reality". In her interview with the BBC, Karimova-Tillyaeva said that her then-husband has a share in a trade and transport company and that he has never been involved in public tenders, been associated with national resource industries like gas or cotton, and does not enjoy tax exemptions or monopoly status.

In an annual list of Switzerland's wealthiest residents published by Bilan in November 2013, the assets of Lola and her ex-husband, Timur were estimated between 100 and 200 million dollars. The same figures were mentioned by Bilan in 2014 as well.

In 2013, Karimova-Tillyaeva founded The Harmonist, a luxury fragrance house inspired by the principles of Chinese Feng Shui and the balance of the Five Elements. Developed in collaboration with master French perfumer Guillaume Flavigny of Givaudan, The Harmonist range interprets the five elements through the dynamic interplay of Yin and Yang. It was nominated several times at the US Fragrance Foundation Awards and winner of Allure magazine's Best of Beauty Award 2022, the brand centers on balance and wellbeing.

In 2017, the European Investigative Collaborations and Mediapart revealed that Karimova-Tillyaeva had more than 127 million euros in offshore bank accounts in Switzerland and the United Arab Emirates.

Karimova-Tillyaeva also served as Executive Producer of the 2017 feature documentary “The Man Who Unlocked the Universe.” The film explores the life and work of Ulugh Beg, a 15th-century Timurid ruler and astronomer known for his contributions to astronomical research and for developing Samarkand as a center of scientific study. This documentary is currently available on several streaming services, including Prime Video, Roku, Tubi, Plex, Fawesome TV, Pluto, and was most recently added on Documentary+.

== Personal life ==
Karimova-Tillyaeva is divorced from businessman Timur Tillyaev. The couple were separated in 2024 and finalized their divorce in September 2025. They have three children: two daughters and a son (Mariam, Safia and Umar).

In July 2013, various media outlets reported that Karimova-Tillyaeva had purchased a home in Beverly Hills.

In an interview with the BBC Uzbek Service in 2013, Karimova-Tillyaeva stated that she had not been in contact with her sister Gulnara for 12 years and that "There are no family or friendly relations between us...We are completely different people."

=== Charity ===
She heads two charitable organizations in Uzbekistan, which help orphaned children and children with disabilities. The You are not Alone Foundation was established by Karimova-Tillyaeva in 2002 to provide assistance to orphanages and children left without parental care in Uzbekistan. Two years later, Karimova-Tillyaeva co-founded the National Centre for the Social Adaptation of Children, a charitable organization which provides medical and educational assistance to children with disabilities.
