= Ahmad A'zam =

Ahmad Aʼzam
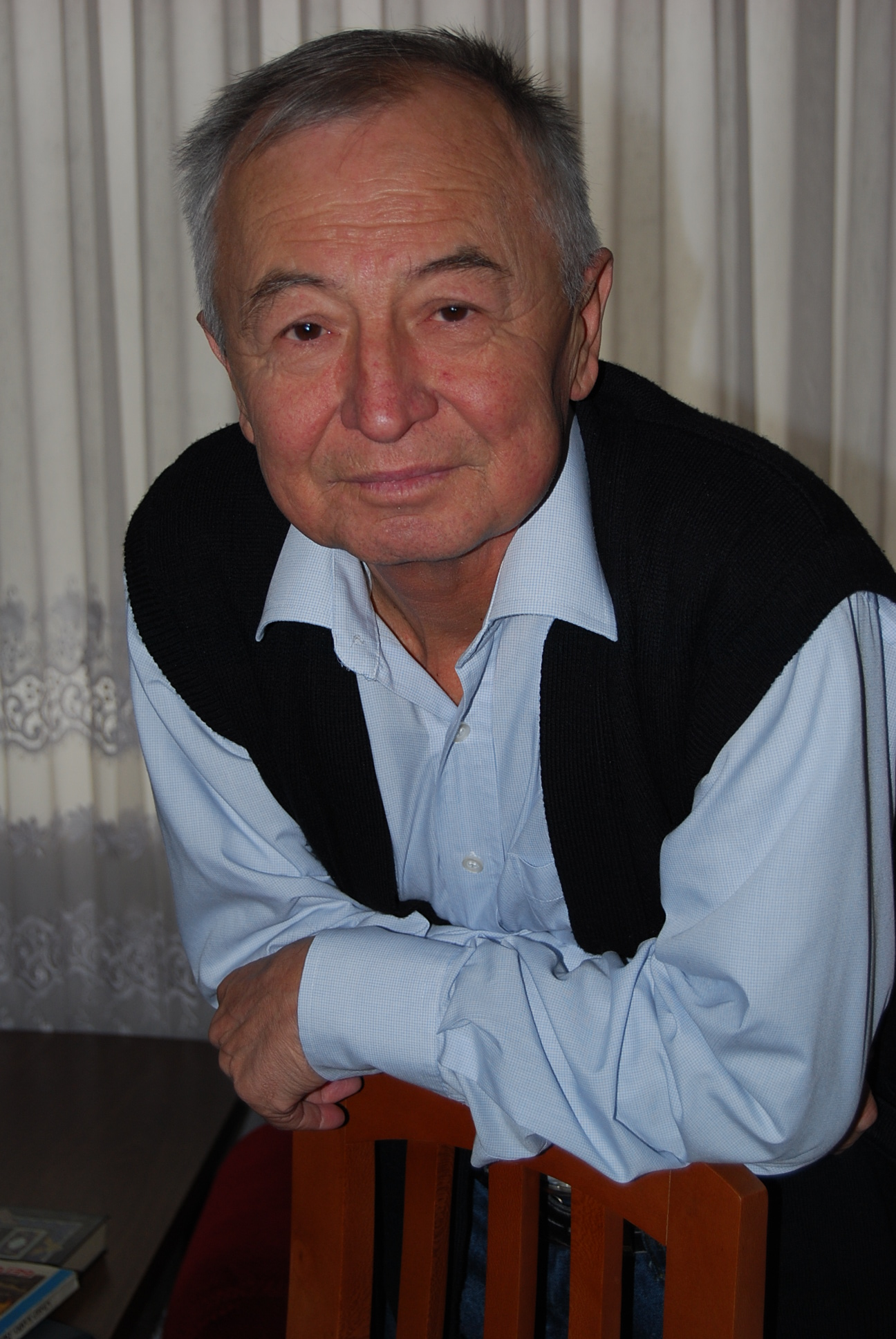
- Born: Аҳмад Аъзам; 28 June 1949; Samarkand, Uzbekistan
- Died: 4 January 2014 (aged 64); Tashkent, Uzbekistan
- Occupation: Writer
- Years active: 1972–1969 (journalist); 1990–2004 (activist); 1987–2014 (writer)

Ahmad Aʼzam (Аҳмад Аъзам) (28 June 1949 – 4 January 2014) was an Uzbek writer, author, journalist, scriptwriter and literature critic.

== Life ==
Ahmad Aʼzam was born in Jomboy region (Ghazira village) of Samarkand city in Uzbekistan.

From 1995, he was the main editor of "National Television and Radio Company of Uzbekistan", director of "Uzbekistan channel" and "O'zbektelefilm" studio. He is the author of television shows, programmes and documentaries including: "O’zlik", "Xalqning ko’ngli", To’rtinchi hokimiyat" .

His political involvement included co-chairmanship of "Birlik" Opposition Movement and Erk/Liberty Democratic Party where he was General Secretary of the Central Council. He was also member of Uzbek Parliament (Oliy Majlis) from 1999 to 2004.

== Works ==
His published works and books include "Oyning gardishi", "Bu kunning davomi", "Asqartog' tomonlarda", "Soyasini yo'qotgan odam", "O'zi uylanmagan sovchi", "O'zim bilan o'zim", "Mas'ul so'z" and others.
