= Mirziyoyev =

Mirziyoyev (feminine: Mirziyoyeva) is an Uzbek surname. Notable people with the surname include:

== Mirziyoyev ==
- Shavkat Mirziyoyev (born 1957), President of Uzbekistan

== Mirziyoyeva ==
- Saida Mirziyoyeva (born 1984), Uzbek politician
- Ziroat Mirziyoyeva (born 1964), First Lady of Uzbekistan
