= 1991 Uzbek presidential election =

- 29 December 1991
- Registered: 10,515,066
- Turnout: 94.16%
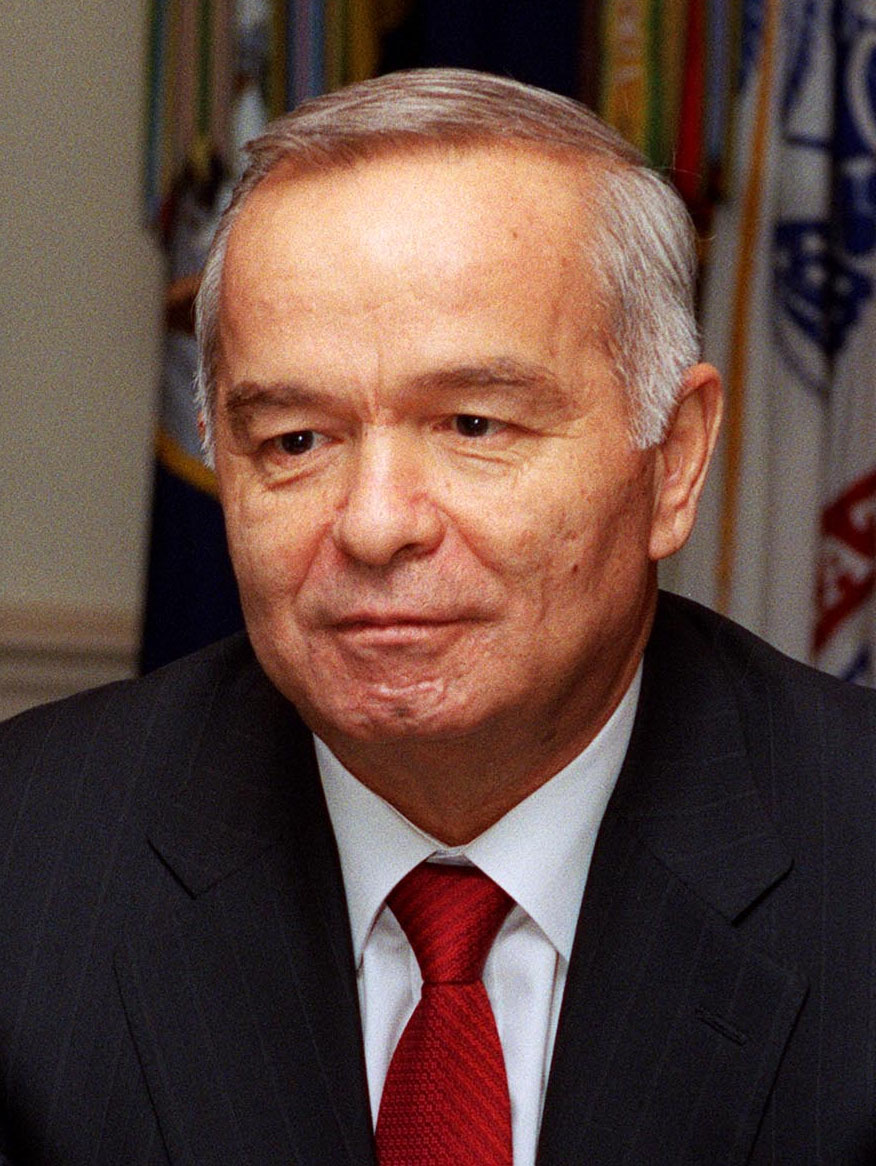

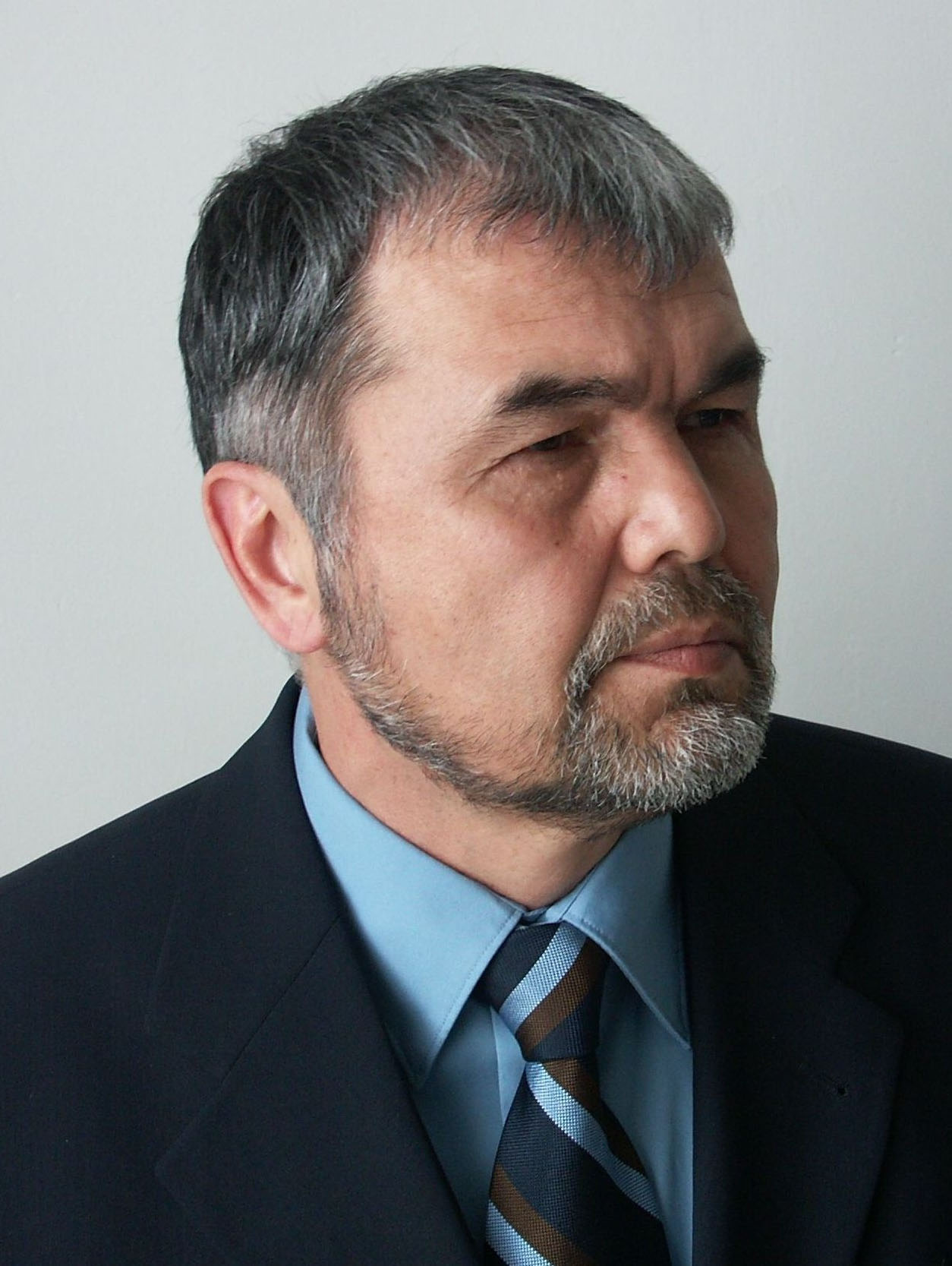
Nominee	Islam Karimov	Muhammad Salih
Party	XDP	Erk
Popular vote	8,514,136	1,220,474
Percentage	87.14%	12.49%
- Results by region
President before election
Islam Karimov
CPSU
Elected President
Islam Karimov
XDP

Direct presidential elections were held for the first time in Uzbekistan on 29 December 1991. Their result was a victory for Islam Karimov of the People's Democratic Party of Uzbekistan, who won with 87% of the vote. Voter turnout was reported to be 94%. The elections were held alongside an independence referendum.

The elections were the only presidential elections in Uzbekistan to date to feature a genuine opposition candidate. Every election since has been considered to feature only token opposition candidates. Karimov later ruled until his death in 2016.

== Background ==
Karimov had been elected the first President of the Uzbek SSR by the Supreme Soviet on 24 March 1990, with 491 votes in favour and 7 against.

== Candidates ==
Initially several prominent figures were interested in running. Besides Karimov and Muhammad Salih, a prominent opposition leader, Abdurakhim Pulatov from Unity and Abdullah Utayev, leader of Islamic Renaissance Party of Uzbekistan, both declared their candidacy. However, they were unable to register due to obstacles placed in their way by the government: Pulatov failed to gather enough signatures while Utayev was unable to register as his party was not recognized by the government. Pulatov claimed that the government wanted to prevent him from running due to a new election law which required candidates to collect signatures in only few days. Ultimately Salih was the only opposition candidate.

Despite having a real opposition candidate, Karimov was expected to win due to his control of government apparatus and state media. Salih was only given 15 minutes airtime on several television stations, while Karimov's speeches were aired regularly. Salih focused his campaign on promising to liberalize the political, social and economic spheres, while Karimov was focused on sovereignty and the social and spiritual revival of Uzbekistan.

== Results ==
Officially, Karimov was re-elected in a landslide, beating Salih with just over 87 percent of the vote. However, observers stated the election was heavily rigged by Karimov's government, with many violations of regulations and ballot stuffing. In the early election results, Salih had received 30% of vote and Karimov 40%, potentially requiring a second round. However, a few hours later the results were revised to state Karimov was the winner with over 50 percent of the vote. Several independent observers claimed that Salih had received over 50% of vote.

Salih told the Helsinki Commission that he had actually received 30% of vote, implying that he had conceded that Karimov was the winner of the election. However, he also protested the election process was unfair. He later joined Pulatov in demanding fresh elections under a new electoral law in a student protest. However, in the end Karimov's regime suppressed the protest and Pulatov and Salih later went into exile.

Candidate	Party	Votes	%
Islam Karimov	People's Democratic Party	8,514,136	87.14
Muhammad Salih	Erk	1,220,474	12.49
Against all		36,525	0.37
Total		9,771,135	100.00
Valid votes		9,771,135	98.69
Invalid/blank votes		129,823	1.31
Total votes		9,900,958	100.00
Registered voters/turnout		10,515,066	94.16
Source: Nohlen et al.
