= Erk Democratic Party =

Political party in Uzbekistan

Erk Democratic Party "Erk" demokratik partiyasi
- Abbreviation: EDP
- Leader: Muhammad Salih
- General Secretary: Atanazar Arifov
- Founder: Muhammad Salih
- Founded: 30 April 1990; 36 years ago
- Registered: 19 September 1991; 34 years ago
- Banned: 1993; 33 years ago
- Headquarters: Pushkin St. 1, Tashkent
- Newspaper: Erk
- Ideology: National conservatism
- Political position: Right-wing
- National affiliation: People's Movement of Uzbekistan
- Colours: Blue
- Legislative Chamber: 0 / 150

Party flag

Website
- www.uzerk.org

The Erk Democratic Party (Uzbek: "Erk" Demokratik Partiyasi, lit. 'Liberty Democratic Party') is a political party in Uzbekistan formed in 1990 as a pro-independence party in the Soviet Union. It was the first registered political party in the history of Uzbekistan. Its charter was registered at the Ministry of Justice, Certificate of registration dated 3 September 1991, No. 039, which was signed by the minister of justice before the adoption of the law of Uzbekistan on political parties. The principal goals of activities, as written in the certificate on registration, are "the foundation of the independent democratic republic for Uzbekistan." Since 1993, its headquarters have been in Istanbul, Turkey.

== Organization ==
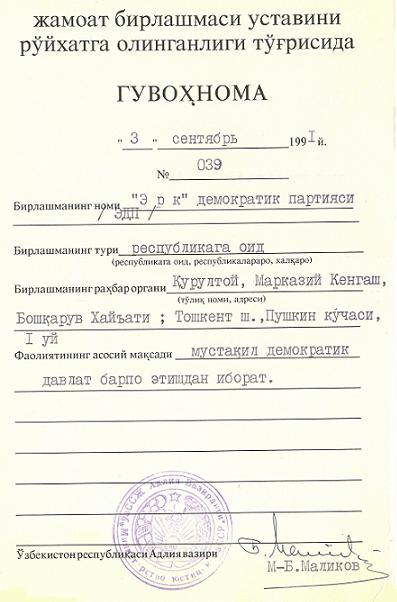
Page of the certificate on the party registration party

Page of the certificate newspaper of the party

The leader of the party is Muhammad Salih, and the general secretary is Atanazar Arif. The official newspaper of the party, ERK, which was registered (see image) with the Publishing Committee of Uzbekistan on September 19, 1991 under the No.000092, has been published in the Uzbek and Russian languages since 1990. Among the journalists who have written for it is Yusif Ruzimuradov, who has been sentenced to eight years imprisonment.

== History and elections ==
The ERK party has participated in the first general elections of the independent Uzbekistan for the post of presidency of Uzbekistan with its candidate on 29 December 1991. The leader of the party Muhammad Salih was the only opponent of Islam Karimov in the 1991 Uzbek presidential election. At that time, Muhammad Salih was the chairman of the Union of Writers of Uzbekistan, whereas Islam Karimov was the president of the country, elected on 24 March 1991 by the Supreme Council of Uzbekistan. According to official election results 12,7% voted for Muhammad Salih; however, according to the results broadcast over the radio of Uzbekistan, 33% voted for him; and more than 50% - according to the calculations of the independent observers from the information of the trusted representatives of the party's candidate; trusted representatives of the candidate of the ERK party reported that protocols on the results of the elections were changed without the consent of the voters in some constituencies (districts) and delivered to the Central Elections Committee without voters' signatures; according to the information of the staff of the main publishing center to the office of the ERK party where the voting bulletins were printed and issued to the voting stations that the total number of voting bulletins exceeded the number of the voters by 50%.

The ERK party was not allowed to contest the December 2007 presidential elections. In an interview for the Guardian newspaper, Atanazar Arif of ERK said: "It's not democratic. Karimov is a neo-communist dictator. He's a bit like Mugabe...He has no intention of giving up power."

== Legislative influence ==
The ERK party is author of the bill "Declaration of Independence" as well as initiator of its review and adoption. A session of the Supreme Council of Uzbekistan, a day after the confirmation its agenda order of the day and the beginning of its work, 20 June 1990, reviewed its agenda order of the day once again, added to it the issue of the independence of the republic and accepted the bill for review presented by the ERK party despite the criticism of the Central Committee of the Communist Party of Uzbekistan headed by Islam Karimov. On the demand of Mikhail Gorbachev, General Secretary of the Communist Party of the Soviet Union (CPSU), minor amendments were introduced, some of them after the voting and adoption by the Session the whole text of the bill, which was done through Efimov, the second secretary of the Central Committee of the Communist Party of Uzbekistan, who was in touch with Gorbachov over the telephone during the session; however, all these amendments did not change the spirit of the bill.

== Congresses ==
=== First ===
The first (constituent) congress of the party took place on April 30, 1990 in the city of Tashkent, in the House of Knowledge located in Abay street. During this meeting program and the Charter of the party (Atanazar Arif reported) was adopted, as well as members of the Central Council and leader of the party were elected. Famous poet Muhammad Salih was elected as the Leader of the party, who was the Chairman of the Union of Writers of Uzbekistan at the time; as a vice-chairman of the party was elected Atanazar Arif, physicist (at the next party meeting this post was replaced with the new posts of General Secretary and Secretaries of the Central Committee of the party), who was vice-chairman of the trade union committee of the Tashkent Polytechnics Institute.

=== Second ===
The second meeting of the party took place on 3 February 1991 in the city of Tashkent, in the old hall of the UzbekTourism (this building is removed nowadays). During this meeting participants adopted amendments and additions to the Charter and the program of the party, specifically, two new posts were introduced: General Secretary of the Central Council and Secretaries of the Central Council. A writer, Ahmad A'zam, was elected General Secretary of the Central Council, whereas Atanazar Arif and Hamidulla Nurmuhammedov were elected as secretaries of the Central Council.

=== Third ===
The third meeting of the party took place on 25 August 1991 in the city of Tashkent, in the new hall of the UzbekTourism located within the complex of the Tata hotel. At the meeting participants criticized usurpation and violent capture of the power by the State Committee on Emergency Situations (SCES) headed by Yanaev, they also criticized the support of the SCES by the government of Uzbekistan. During this meeting participants also listed their demands and suggestions to the government of Uzbekistan on the implementation of the Independence Declaration of Uzbekistan, which was adopted on 20 June 1990 with the initiation of the ERK party, particularly, a bill on the implementation of the Independence Declaration was presented.

Materials of the meeting and the application on the government registration of the party together with the list of about four thousand members (the required number of members is three thousand) were submitted to the Ministry of Justice of Uzbekistan; on 3 September 1991 Ministry of Justice confirmed the government registration of the party and issued Certificate No. 039 on the registration of the ERK party.

=== Fourth ===
The fourth meeting of the party took place on 25 September 1993 in the Tashkent hall of the «Railroad workers». According to the number of the distributed party membership cards and information used to establish the norms of delegation the total number of the members of the party was approximately 54,000 before the meeting. Leader of the party Muhammad Salih was not able to attend the meeting because of his forceful exile. This meeting was under the strong surveillance (supervision) of the government police forces. Atanazar Arif was the head of the Temporary Committee for organizing the meeting and during the work meeting. During the meeting participants made amendments to the Charter of the party, elected the leader, Central Council and other representative organs of the party. Muhammad Salih was elected again as the leader of the party despite negative reaction of the government, although at this time he was in exile.

=== Fifth ===
The fifth meeting of the party took place on 22 October 2003 at the Tashkent Cultural Center of the society of blind people located on the Cholpanata street. During his meeting participants adopted amendments and additions to the Charter and program of the party, particularly, the post of the candidate of the party to the presidential elections of Uzbekistan was introduced; multi-stage order of the selection of the candidate within the party for this post was established; members of the Central Council and those of the other representative organs of the party were elected. Muhammad Salih was re-elected as leader of the party and Atanazar Arif as the general secretary.

== See also ==
- Erk Democratic Party politicians
