= Bilan (magazine) =

Biweekly business magazine in Switzerland

- Categories: Business magazine
- Frequency: Monthly (until 2005); Biweekly
- Publisher: Tamedia (TX Group)
- First issue: 1 June 1989; 37 years ago
- Company: Edipresse Group (until 2011); Tamedia Group
- Country: Switzerland
- Based in: Geneva
- Language: French
- Website: Bilan
- ISSN: 1422-2035
- OCLC: 316260128

Bilan is a biweekly business magazine published in Geneva, Switzerland. The magazine has been in circulation since 1989.

== History and profile ==
Bilan was first published in June 1989. The publisher of the magazine was Alain Fabarez. It was owned by the Edipresse Group until November 2011. Then it became part of the Tamedia Group. The magazine is published biweekly by Tamedia Publications on Wednesdays and has its headquarters in Geneva. It came out monthly until 2005 when its frequency was switched to biweekly. Its headquarters was formerly in Lausanne.

Bilan is the French counterpart of the Swiss German business magazine, BILANZ, and features analyses of finance markets and targets managers of small or large enterprises and decision makers. It publishes several listings, including the 300 richest Switzerland, the 100 richest in Europe, the 300 most influential Switzerland, the 50 start-up invest in and the top 30 employers. The biweekly also publishes interviews.

Max Mabillard is one of the former editors-in-chief of Bilan. Stéphane Benoit-Godet served in the post until 1 November 2014 when Myret Zaki was named as the editor-in-chief.

== Circulation ==
The circulation of Bilan was 15,000 copies during its initial period. Between July 2004 and June 2005 the magazine sold 18,569 copies. Its circulation was 18,703 copies between July 2005 and June 2006 and 19,047 copies between July 2006 and June 2007. It increased to 19,325 copies for the period between July 2007 and June 2008. In 2011 the magazine sold 13,111 copies and 11,448 copies in 2014.

== See also ==
- List of magazines in Switzerland
