= Muhammad Salih =

Uzbek political opposition leader and writer (born 1949)

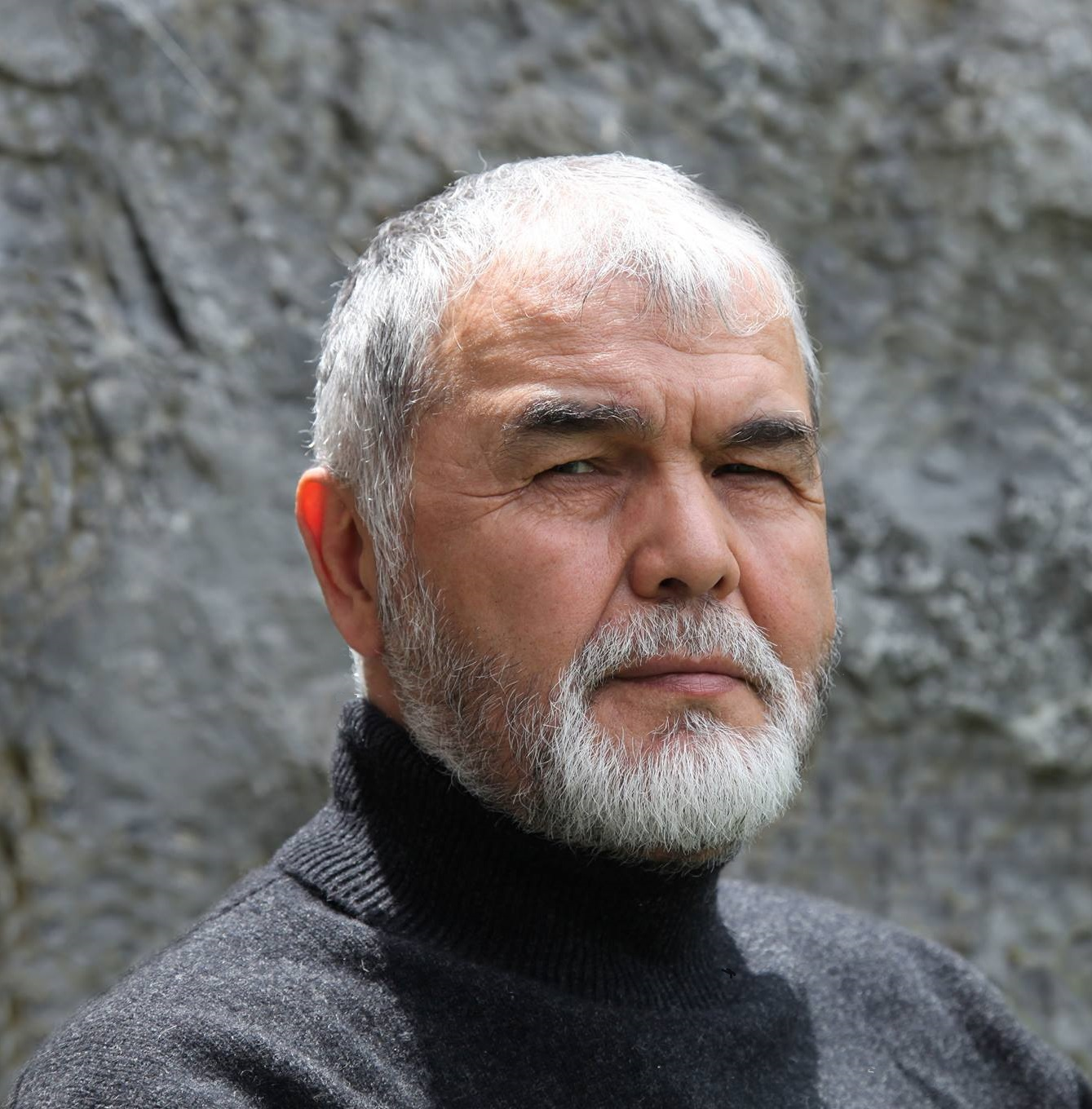

Personal details
- Born: Salay Madaminov; December 20, 1949 (age 76) Gurlan District, Uzbek SSR, Soviet Union
- Party: Unity (1988–1990); Erk Democratic Party (1990–present)
- Education: Tashkent State University
- Occupation: Politician, journalist, poet

Muhammad Salih (Uzbek: Muhammad Solih, born 20 December 1949) is an Uzbek political opposition leader and writer. He was the opposition candidate in the 1991 Uzbek presidential election, the first and only time an Uzbek president has faced a serious challenger in an election.

== Early life ==
He was born in the Gurlan District of the Khorezm region of Uzbekistan on December 20, 1949. He is a descendant of the well-known aristocratic family Khorezm Beks. He was named after his birth as Muhammad Salih as consonant to his father's name, Muhammad Amin (Madamin). In 1966 he graduated from high school in Khorezm.

In 1968 he was drafted into the army. In August 1968, he participated in the intervention of the Soviet Army in Czechoslovakia. After demobilization (1970) Salih studied journalism with the faculty of Tashkent State University. After graduation, he was a listener at the higher literature courses at the Writers' Union in Moscow.

== Literary activities ==
In 1977, he published his first collected poems which brought him instantaneous fame as a poet of avant-gardism. After he was warned by Laziz Kayumov, the main ideologist of the Republic and Chief Editor of the newspaper “Sovet Uzbekistoni”, about the “Baneful influence of the West in poetry”, the first period of his destiny was to be rejected by socialist society. Henceforth and till the 90s he was called a “westernizer in poetry, distant from national traditions”. Salih's early creative activity characterized by the concord of western avant-gardism (especially surrealism) with the complicative Sufi philosophy (especially the school of Djalal ad-Din Rumi) and metaphorics linked to its mystical foundation. He translated the prose of Franz Kafka and French poets of the 20th century. His poems were translated into many languages. Hundreds of articles and books have been written about him. His poems were first translated to Russian by Victor Sosnora and later by Alexey Parshchikov.

== Political activities ==
Muhammed Salih was not a member of the Communist Party. His political activity began in the mid-1980s in close connection with his literary reformist activity within the Union of Writers of Uzbekistan. He wrote his first political manifest in December 1984. The Manifest was aimed against the policy of the Central Committee of the Communist Party of Uzbekistan towards national literature, language and history. It was signed by 53 young poets and sent to the Politburo of the Central Committee of the Communist Party of the Soviet Union, known as the "Letter To The Politburo". The letter criticized the Communist Party as "anti-Uzbek.", Subsequently, Salih published several articles condemning the government's demographic and environmental policies in Uzbekistan. In 1988 Salih was elected Chairman of the Union of Writers of Uzbekistan thanks to collaboration with the KGB.

At the beginning of Perestroyka Salih became one of the founders of “Birlik” / “Unity”. In 1989 he founded “Erk” (Freedom) Party. In 1990 Salih was elected to the Uzbek Supreme Council.

In June 1990 on Erk Party initiative Uzbek Supreme Council adopted the Declaration of Sovereignty of Uzbekistan. Salih was nominated as a candidate in the first presidential elections in Uzbekistan in December 1991 and was the only rival of Uzbekistan President Islam Karimov. According to the official results Solih received 12.5% of votes, and according to the results announced previously by Uzbekistan Radio he gained 33% and according to the independent observers – the majority of votes. Most election observers said the elections were neither fair nor democratic. After the elections the student's demonstrations were put under gunfire, oppositional newspapers were shut down, criminal charges were filed against the leaders of opposition, Secretary of Erk Party Atanazar Arif was detained.

On June 2, 1992 in response to increasing government repression, Salih resigned from his position as the deputy of Oliy Majlis, (Uzbek parliament). In December 1992 he was accused of foundation of ”Milliy Majlis” and in April 1993 was arrested by an accusation of high treason. But he was released as a result of international pressure under the written undertaking not to leave Tashkent. But he managed to run away first to Azerbaijan and later to Turkey. The Fourth Congress of Erk was held on September 25, 1993 in city of Tashkent without Salih. The Congress worked under the conditions of strong surveillance by low enforcement structures of the authorities. However, the Congress succeeded to adopt amendments to the Charter of the Party, to elect the Chairman, Central Council and other leading bodies of the Party. Representatives of the authorities openly demanded to replace the leader by a puppet person of the regime, but the Congress re-elected Muhammad Salih as a leader of the Party despite his absence and in exile.

Human rights, freedom of thought, freedom of the individual, all the freedoms that Western civilization is calling for are present in Islam

After the Tashkent bombings of February 16, 1999 he was accused of being part of the plot and was sentenced to 15 years in prison in absentia. His brothers were also detained and sentenced to long prison terms. In an interview, Salih has stated that his brothers are still in prison after more than 10 years, and under conditions of continuous torture. In the closely observed trial of Solih, the prosecution produced a confession from Zayniddin Askarov to implicate Solih in the bombing. Later, Askarov, in an interview broadcast by Voice of America, said his confession was taken under torture, and Solih was not a part of the bombing.

On October 20, 2003, the 5th Congress of “Erk” (Freedom) Party was held in Tashkent, where National Security Service of Uzbekistan with the help of small group of members of “Birlik” organization under the command of S. Murat attempted to wreck the work of Party's forum. The Congress concluded by adopting the amendments to the Charter and the Program of the Party and election of the leading bodies.

In 2009, on the initiative of Salih, a coalition of opposition forces was established in Uzbekistan, consisting of the “Erk” (Freedom) Party, the organization "Andijan: Justice and Revival" and "Tayanch" (Reliance).

On May 28, 2011, the People's Movement of Uzbekistan was established in Berlin on the platform of the "Union of May 13", which included eight organizations representing different social groups, including the communities of moderate Muslims. Salih was elected Chairman of the Board of Founders of PMU with the majority vote of the delegates of the organization.

In June 2012, the Second Congress of the NDU was held in Prague, where the delegates re-elected M.Salih as their leader.

A plot to assassinate Muhammad Salih was reported to be discovered by the Turkish police in December 2015.

== Arrest and detention in Prague ==
If I will be sent back to Uzbekistan, I will be killed. Definitely.

— Muhammad Salih, while awaiting decision on extradition in Pankrác Prison, December 7, 2001

On November 28, 2001 Salih arrived to Prague by plane from Amsterdam at the invitation of Radio Free Europe. The Czech police and Interpol arrested Salih at Ruzyně Airport due to international arrest warrant issued by the Uzbekistan Interpol bureau alleging Salih's participation in terrorist activities connected to bombings that killed 16 people in the capital, Tashkent, in 1999. Salih was detained at the Pankrác Prison, awaiting outcome of the extradition proceedings.

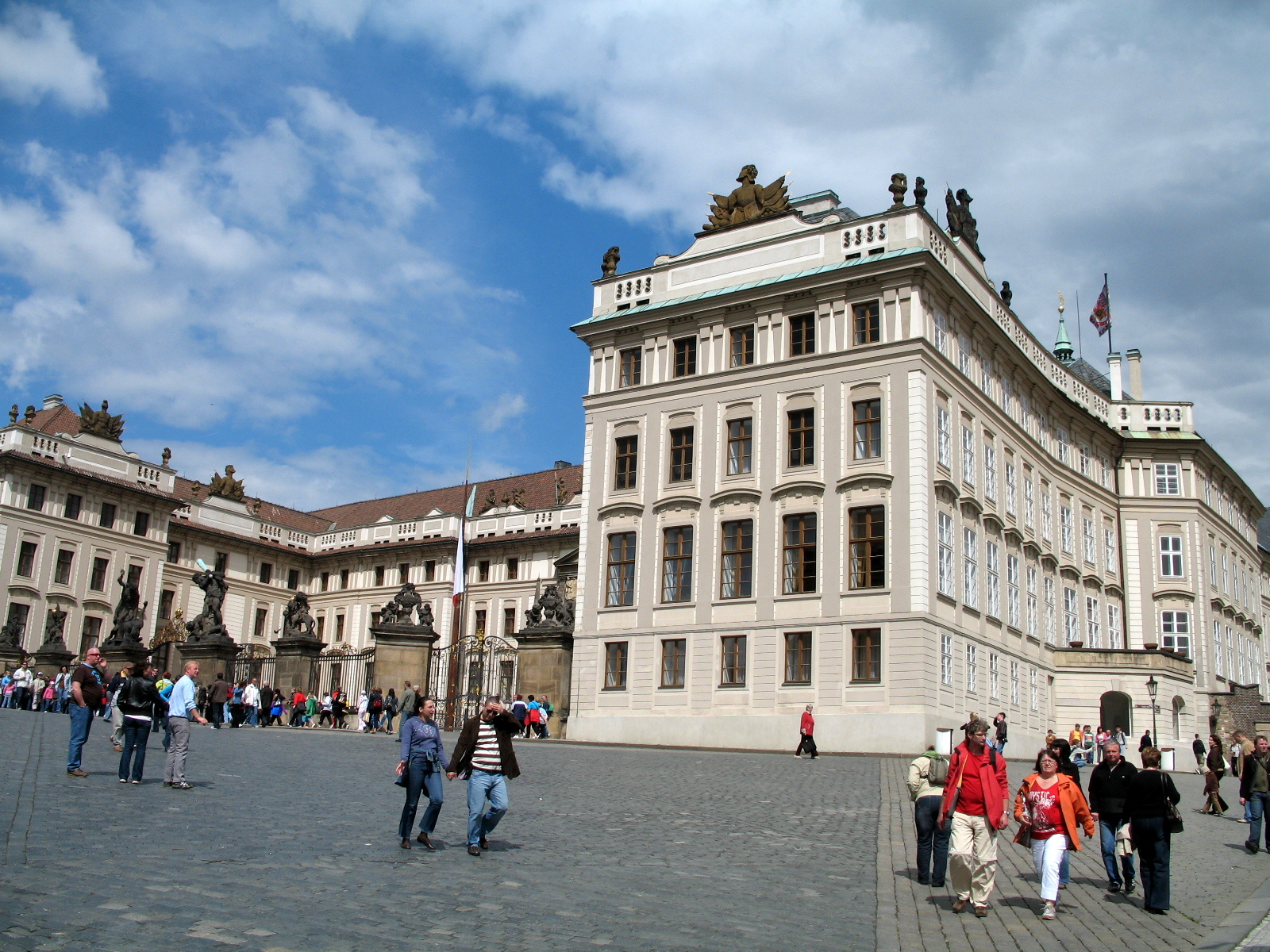
Czech President Václav Havel received Salih at the Prague Castle on December 12, 2001, saying that he has no influence over judicial extradition proceedings

Salih had been granted political asylum in Norway, which ignored the international arrest warrant.

Several international organizations, such as Amnesty International, Human Rights Watch and the International Helsinki Federation called for Salih's release. Jean-Claude Concolato, the Prague representative of the United Nations high commissioner for refugees, said that under the 1951 Geneva Convention, Mr. Salikh could not be deported if he was likely to face torture or imprisonment for his beliefs. The Czech interior minister, Stanislav Gross, said the police had no choice but to act on the international arrest warrant.

Salih was released from remand custody on December 11, 2001, under the condition that he stay in the country until the extradition proceedings are finished.

On December 14, 2001, the Prague Municipal Court ruled it will not extradite Salih to Uzbekistan, as the Uzbek authorities failed to prove that Salih would be given a fair hearing.

Salih commented that, at least, the arrest won him a meeting with the Czech president, Václav Havel, who had been himself jailed for 5 years during communist era, and therefore brought fresh attention to the beleaguered cause of campaigning for democracy in one of the authoritarian states of Central Asia.

On May 6, 2006, Salih was arrested and detained by the Swedish police at the Stockholm-Arlanda Airport due to the same international arrest warrant.

== Video ==
On the 60th anniversary M.Salih a biopic was filmed by turkiston.tv studio — «Қуролсиз кишининг озoдлиги» on YouTube — «Свобода невооруженного человека» on YouTube — «Freedom of Unarmed Man» on YouTube — «Silahsız Kişinin Özgürlüğü» on YouTube.

== Books ==
- "Oydinlik sari", 1993, Istanbul, "ERK"
- "Etikodning chorrahasi bolmaydi", 1994, Istanbul"ERK"
- "Ikror", 1995, Istanbul, "ERK"
- "Devlet sirlari" (in Turkish) 1997, Toker
- "Turkistan suuru" (in Turkish 1997, Otuken
- "Agaclar sair olsa", 1997, (in Turkish), Otuken
- "Yolnoma", (in Uzbek) 1999, Istanbul, "ERK"
- "Yolname" (in Turkish) 2002, Istanbul, Оtuken
- "The articles" - 2003, Istanbul, Acun
- "Valfajr" (Konya - 2005)
- "Publisistika", Izdatelstvo Bilgeoguz, Istanbul-2005
