= Islam Karimov =

Leader of Uzbekistan from 1989 to 2016

Yurtboshi Hero of Uzbekistan Islam Karimov
- Islom Karimov
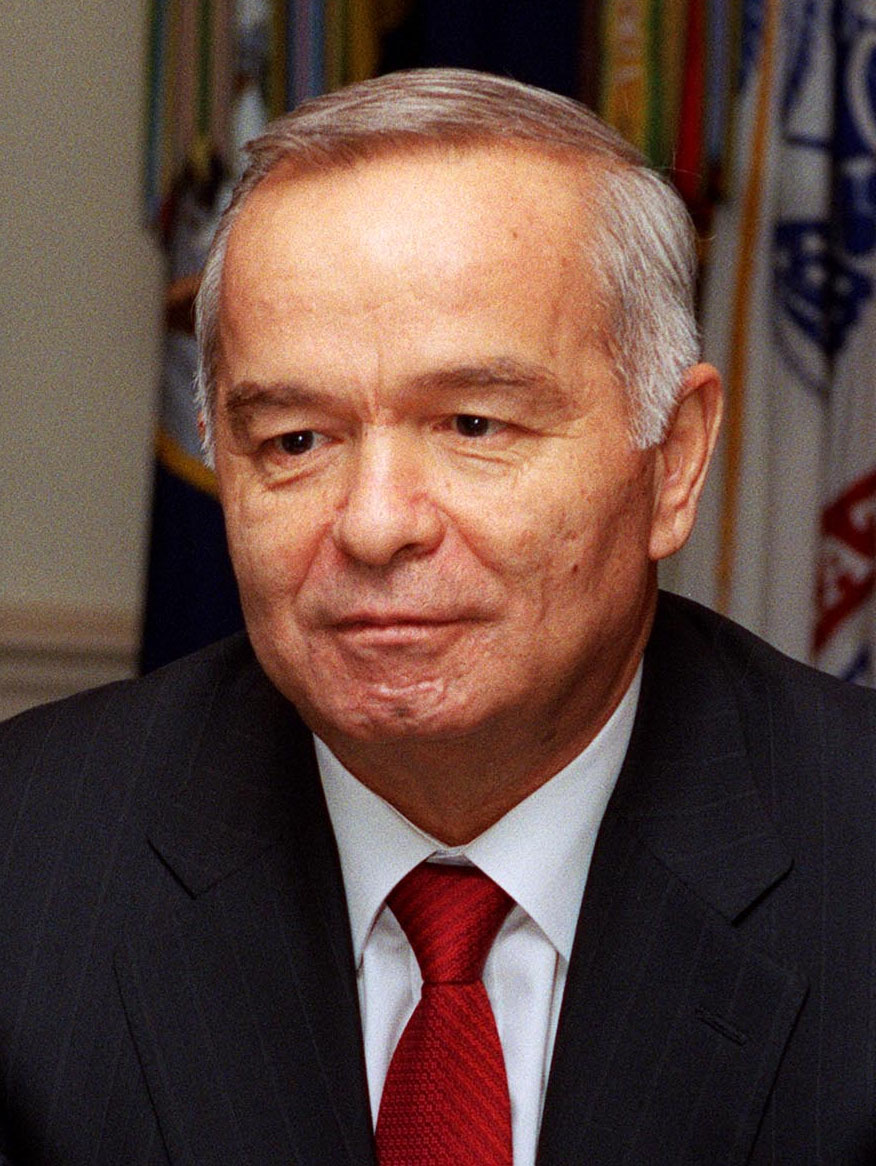
- Karimov in 2002

1st President of Uzbekistan
- In office 1 September 1991 – 2 September 2016
- Prime Minister: Abdulhashim Mutalov; Oʻtkir Sultonov; Shavkat Mirziyoyev
- Vice President: Shukrullo Mirsaidov (1991–1992)
- Preceded by: Office established
- Succeeded by: Nigmatilla Yuldashev (acting); Shavkat Mirziyoyev

President of the Uzbek Soviet Socialist Republic
- In office 24 March 1990 – 1 September 1991
- Vice President: Shukrullo Mirsaidov
- Preceded by: Office established
- Succeeded by: Office abolished

First Secretary of the Communist Party of Uzbekistan
- In office 23 June 1989 – 1 September 1991
- Preceded by: Rafiq Nishonov
- Succeeded by: Office abolished

Personal details
- Born: 30 January 1938 Samarkand, Uzbek SSR, Soviet Union
- Died: 2 September 2016 (aged 78) Tashkent, Uzbekistan
- Resting place: Hazrat Khizr Mosque
- Party: Liberal Democratic (2007–2016)
- Other political affiliations: CPU (before 1991); People's Democratic (1991–2007)
- Spouse(s): Natalya Kuchmi (m. 1964; div. circa 1966); Tatyana Karimova (m. 1967)
- Children: Petr; Gulnara; Lola
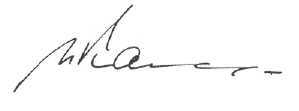
- Signature
- Website: islomkarimov.uz

Islam Abduganiyevich Karimov (Note: Uzbek: Islom Abdugʻaniyevich Karimov, Ислом Абдуғаниевич Каримов; Russian: Ислам Абдуганиевич Каримов) (30 January 1938 – 2 September 2016) was an Uzbek politician who served as the first president of Uzbekistan, from the country's independence in 1991 until his death in 2016. He was the First Secretary of the Communist Party of Uzbekistan from 1989 to 1991, the last to hold the post. The party was reconstituted as the People's Democratic Party of Uzbekistan (O‘zXDP); which Karimov led until 1996. He was the President of the Uzbek SSR from 24 March 1990 until he declared the independence of Uzbekistan on 1 September 1991.

He declared Uzbekistan as an independent nation on 31 August 1991. He subsequently won the presidential election on 30 December 1991, with 86% of the vote. Foreign observers and the opposition cited voting irregularities, alleging state-run propaganda and a falsified vote count. Karimov's first presidential term was extended to 2000 by way of a referendum, and he was re-elected in 2000, 2007 and 2015, each time receiving over 90% of the vote. Karimov initially developed strong ties with the West during the War on Terror, but following the Andijan massacre and subsequent Western condemnation, Uzbekistan moved closer to Russia and China internationally.

He ruled a repressive authoritarian regime in Uzbekistan where political opponents were assassinated, human rights were repressed, and dissent was prohibited. He died from a stroke on 2 September 2016, after being president of the country for 25 years.

== Early life and career ==
Karimov was born in Samarkand to Uzbek parents who were civil servants. According to official data his father was Abdug'ani Karimov, an Uzbek, and his mother was Sanobar Karimova. He was sent to an orphanage in 1941, brought back in 1942, and then returned to the orphanage in 1945. In 1955, he graduated from high school. In 1960, he graduated from the Central Asian Polytechnic Institute (now Tashkent State Technical University) with a degree in mechanical engineering. He started his career as an engineer, eventually joining the Ministry of Water Resources of the Uzbek Soviet Socialist Republic. In 1967, he earned a master's degree in economics from Tashkent State University of Economics.

From 1966 to 1986, he worked his way up the ranks in the Uzbek State Planning Committee, from chief specialist, to department head, to Minister of Finance of the Uzbek SSR, chairman of the State Planning Committee and deputy chairman of the Council of Ministers of the Uzbek SSR. In 1986, Karimov assumed the post of first secretary of the Kashkadarya Regional Committee of the Communist Party of Uzbekistan Committee of the Communist Party of the Uzbek SSR. In 1989, he became first secretary of the Central Committee of the Communist Party of the Uzbek SSR, after his predecessor Rafiq Nishonov failed to quell inter-ethnic clashes and instability in the Fergana Region. From 1990 to 1991, he served as a member of the Central Committee and Politburo. On 24 March 1990, he was elected the first President of the Republic by the Uzbek Supreme Soviet.

On 31 August 1991, 10 days after the attempted coup in Moscow, Karimov declared Uzbekistan to be an independent republic, the second of the Central Asian republics to do so (after neighboring Kyrgyzstan); 1 September was declared Uzbekistan's Independence Day. The Uzbek Communist Party (UCP) changed its name to the People's Democratic Party of Uzbekistan (O‘zXDP). In the December 1991 presidential election, 86 percent of the public cast their votes for Karimov and 12.3 percent for his rival Muhammad Salih, chairman of the Erk (Freedom) Party.

== Presidency ==
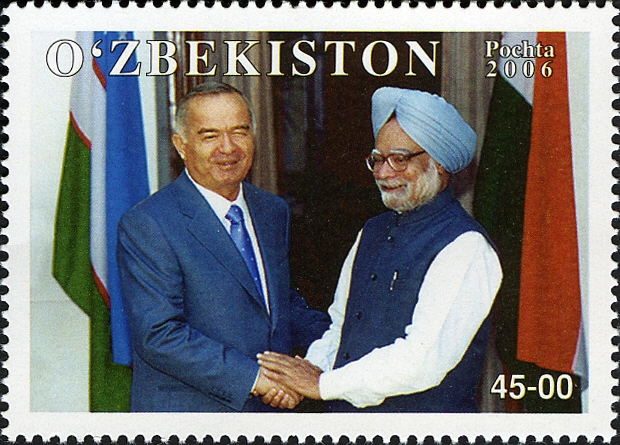
A 2006 Uzbek stamp featuring Karimov and Indian prime minister Manmohan Singh

Uzbekistan under the Karimov government was classified as a hard authoritarian state. The state's primary legitimacy claims are anti-Islamism and ethnic identity. Karimov's primary authoritarian measures that were implemented following the brief period of "thaw" and political tolerance include the thwarting of alternative political leaders from coalition building.

In 1992, he accomplished the hajj.

=== Election controversies ===
In 1995, a few months before Karimov's term was due to expire, his term was extended until 2000 through a referendum. Results showed 99.6 percent of voters favoured extending Karimov's term. The United States criticised the referendum for its "lack of public debate," and noted several instances where one person cast the votes of an entire family. Following the referendum, in 1996, restrictions on opposition were further tightened through the Law on Political Parties. This law ensured the right to meetings, publications and elections of opposition parties, but only to those who had registered with the Ministry of Justice. This policy allowed for government blockage of unapproved parties. Political parties based on ethnic, religious, military or subversive ideas were prohibited. At the time, Karimov publicly stated that he considered the referendum to be a re-election to a second term, which under the Constitution would have required him to leave office in 2000. However, the legislature passed a resolution opposing the decision, leading Karimov to announce he would run for reelection in 2000. In the election held at 9 January, he was reelected with 91.9% of the vote. The United States said that this election "was neither free nor fair and offered Uzbekistan's voters no true choice". The sole opposition candidate, Abdulhafiz Jalalov, implicitly admitted that he entered the race only to make it seem democratic and publicly stated that he voted for Karimov. According to dissident writer Alisher Ilkhamov from the Open Society Foundations, 99.6% had elected to keep Karimov in office after his term had expired, but ballots had been created such that it was much easier for voters to cast a "yes" vote than a "no" vote. Unmarked ballots, as well as ballots of those who did not vote, were automatically counted as "yes" votes, while a full black mark, under the supervision of authorities, was necessary to count as a "no" vote.

=== Administrative policies ===
Karimov took fewer foreign visits, especially to the West, in comparison to his Kazakh counterpart. There were few foreign embassies in Tashkent as of 2016, with only 44 in all: 29 from countries not part of the former Soviet Union and seven from the West.

Under the Karimov government, a heavy regulation policy of NGOs led to the creation of paradoxically named GONGOs, or Government-Organised Non-Governmental Organisations. Trade unions became "an instrument of management rather than a means of interest group-based collective bargaining". The Karimov government required universities to serve a strictly pedagogical purpose and not as a branch of civil society; they had to provide students with skills for the workplace without an emphasis on the skill of critique of public issues.

=== Policies towards Islam ===
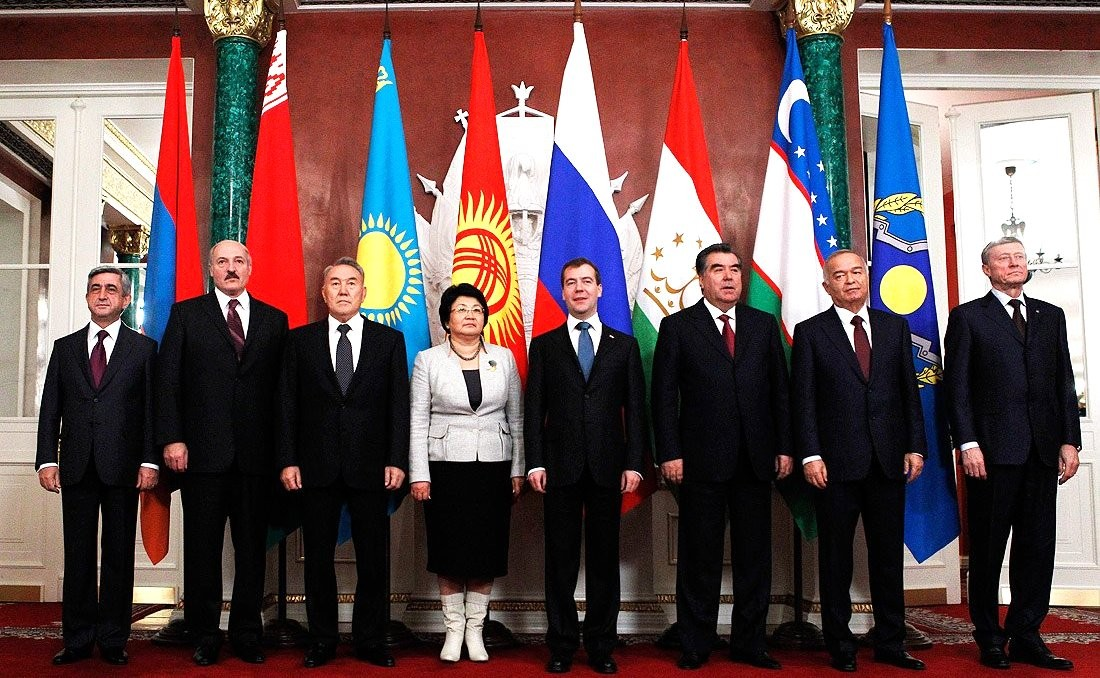
Karimov (2nd from right) at the 2010 CSTO meeting in Moscow Kremlin

Karimov had originally cultivated Islamic symbols after independence in order to coopt religious opposition. In May 1999, as a response to the threat of Islamic radicalism, the Oliy Majlis revised the 'Law on Freedom of Conscience and Religious Organizations' to impose new restrictions on religious groups. The construction of mosques, for example, required permission and specific documentation. An assassination attempt on Karimov in 1999 elicited even more repression of Islamic groups. After the September 11 attacks in 2001, Uzbekistan was considered a strategic ally in the United States' "war on terror" campaign because of a mutual opposition to the Taliban. Uzbekistan hosted an 800-strong U.S. troop presence at the Karshi-Khanabad base, also known as "K2", which supported U.S.-led efforts in the 2001 invasion of Afghanistan. The move was criticized by Human Rights Watch which said the U.S. government subordinated the promotion of human rights to assistance in the War in Afghanistan. U.S.-Uzbek relations deteriorated in May 2005 when Karimov's government strongly encouraged the abandonment of the U.S. base in the face of U.S. government criticism of the government killings of protestors in Andijan. In July 2005 U.S. military forces left Karshi-Khanabad.

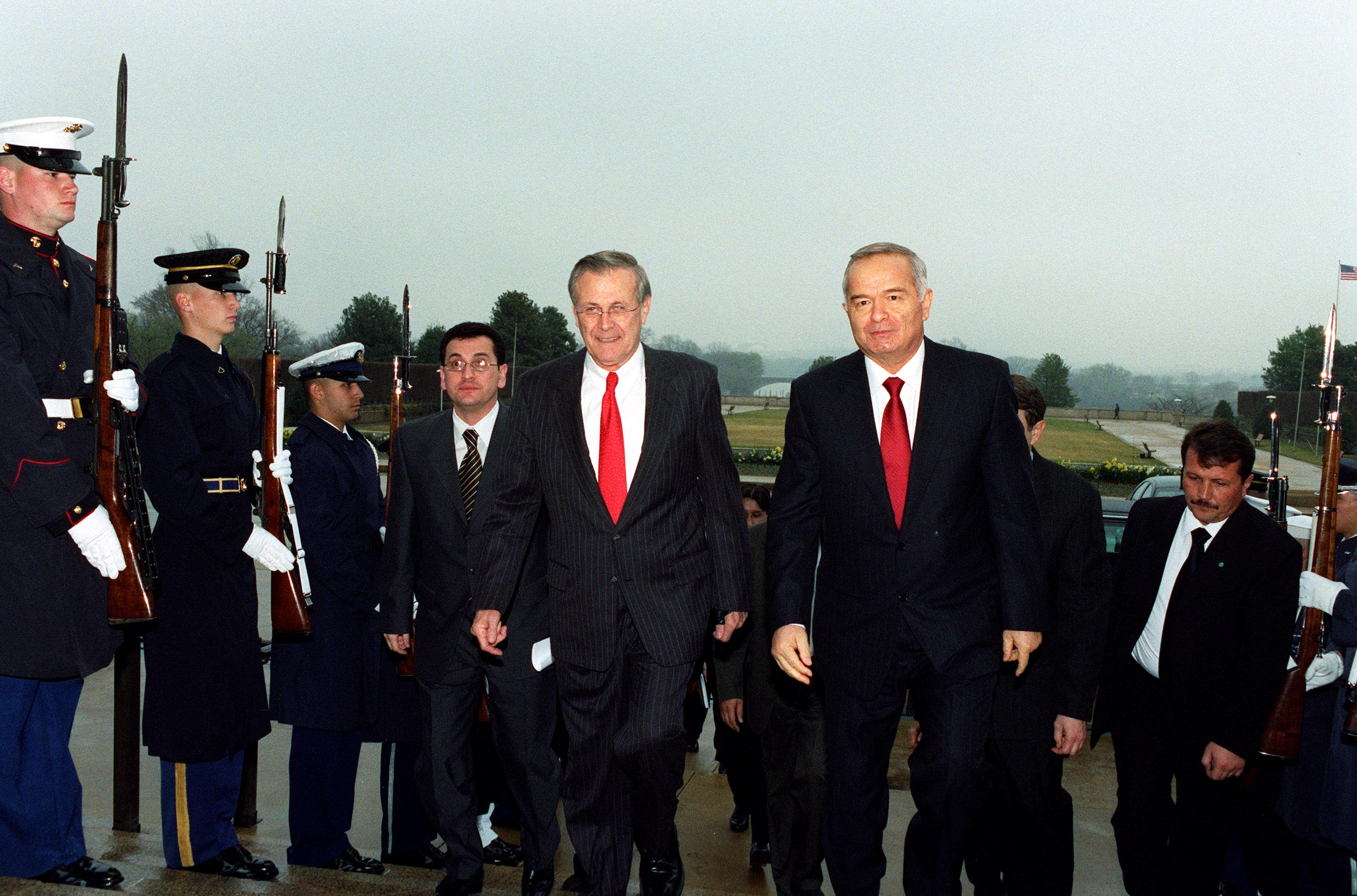
Karimov meets with U.S. Secretary of Defense Donald H. Rumsfeld in the Pentagon on March 13, 2002

Karimov mobilized against the Islamic Movement of Uzbekistan and Hizb ut-Tahrir, two Islamist organizations which have been designated as terrorist by his government. The Uzbek government sentenced Tohir Yoʻldosh and Juma Namangani, leaders of the IMU, to death in absentia. Namangani died in Afghanistan in 2001, and Tohir Yoʻldosh was killed in an air strike on 27 August 2009. From 1991 to 2004, the government imprisoned over 7,000 Uzbeks for "Islamist extremism", and silenced Imams like Muhammad Rajab, who advocated for more open democracy in the early 1990s. These fears of extremism arose out of discourse among the Islamic Movement of Uzbekistan (IMU) of a "Jihad against the Karimov regime". The government of Uzbekistan retains fears of "large-scale all-encompassing anti-state conspiracies" and "echoes of Basmachi" Among Karimov's anti-Islamist policies was the purge of Muslim leaders. Karimov led a crackdown on Adolat, a league of Muslim activists. Explicit fears of threats of Islamic extremism also led to a crackdown of displays of Islamic practice in public. The term "Wahhabis" became the umbrella term to refer to all strains of "extremist" Islam; it did not necessarily refer to the Islamic sect that originated in Saudi Arabia. Ordinary practicing Muslims have been targeted and jailed without trial, and frequent use of torture and occasional "disappearances" have been reported. In 2005 Karimov banned the Muslim call to prayer from being broadcast in the country; the ban was lifted in November 2017 by his successor, Shavkat Mirziyoyev.

=== Re-elections ===
Karimov sought another term in the December 2007 presidential election, despite arguments that he was ineligible because of the two-term limit on the presidency. On 6 November 2007, Karimov accepted the nomination of the Uzbekistan Liberal Democratic Party to run for a third term. On 19 November, the Central Election Commission announced the approval of Karimov's candidacy, a decision that Karimov's opponents condemned as illegal.

Following the election on 23 December 2007, preliminary official results showed Karimov winning with 88.1% of the vote, on a turnout rate that was placed at 90.6%. Observers from groups allied to the Karimov administration such as the Shanghai Cooperation Organisation and the Commonwealth of Independent States gave the election a positive assessment. However, observers from the Organization for Security and Co-operation in Europe criticized the election as lacking a "genuine choice", while others deemed the election, a "political charade", given that all three of Karimov's rivals began their campaign speeches by singing Karimov's praises.

Karimov was reelected for a new term in the 2015 presidential election. He won 90.39% of votes from a voter turnout of 91.08%. This was his third term under Uzbekistan's current constitution. The election was criticized by the Western media and observers as being rigged, while the Commonwealth of Independent States and the Shanghai Cooperation Organisation deemed the election open and democratic.

=== Foreign policy ===
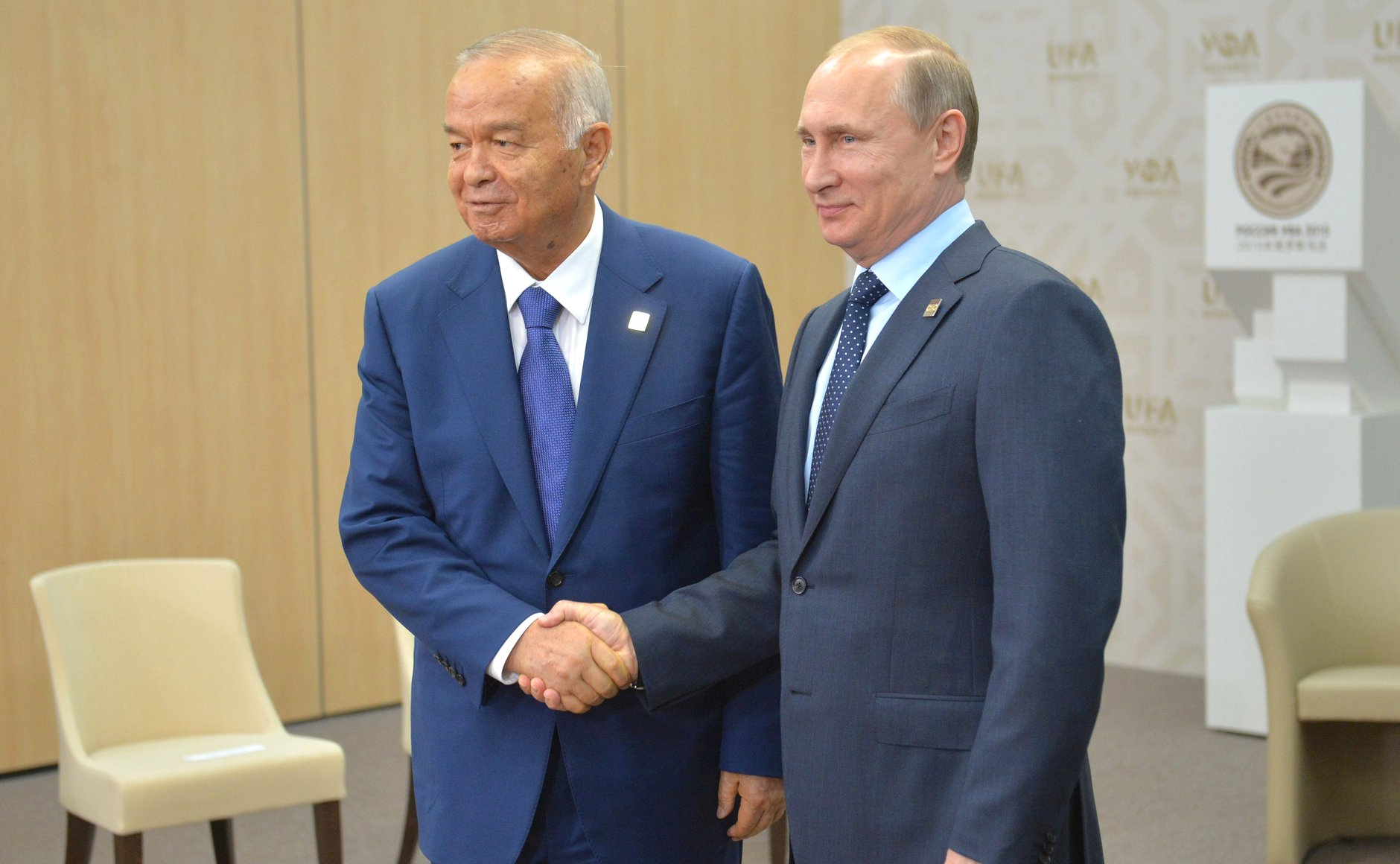
Russian President Vladimir Putin meeting with Karimov in Ufa in 2015

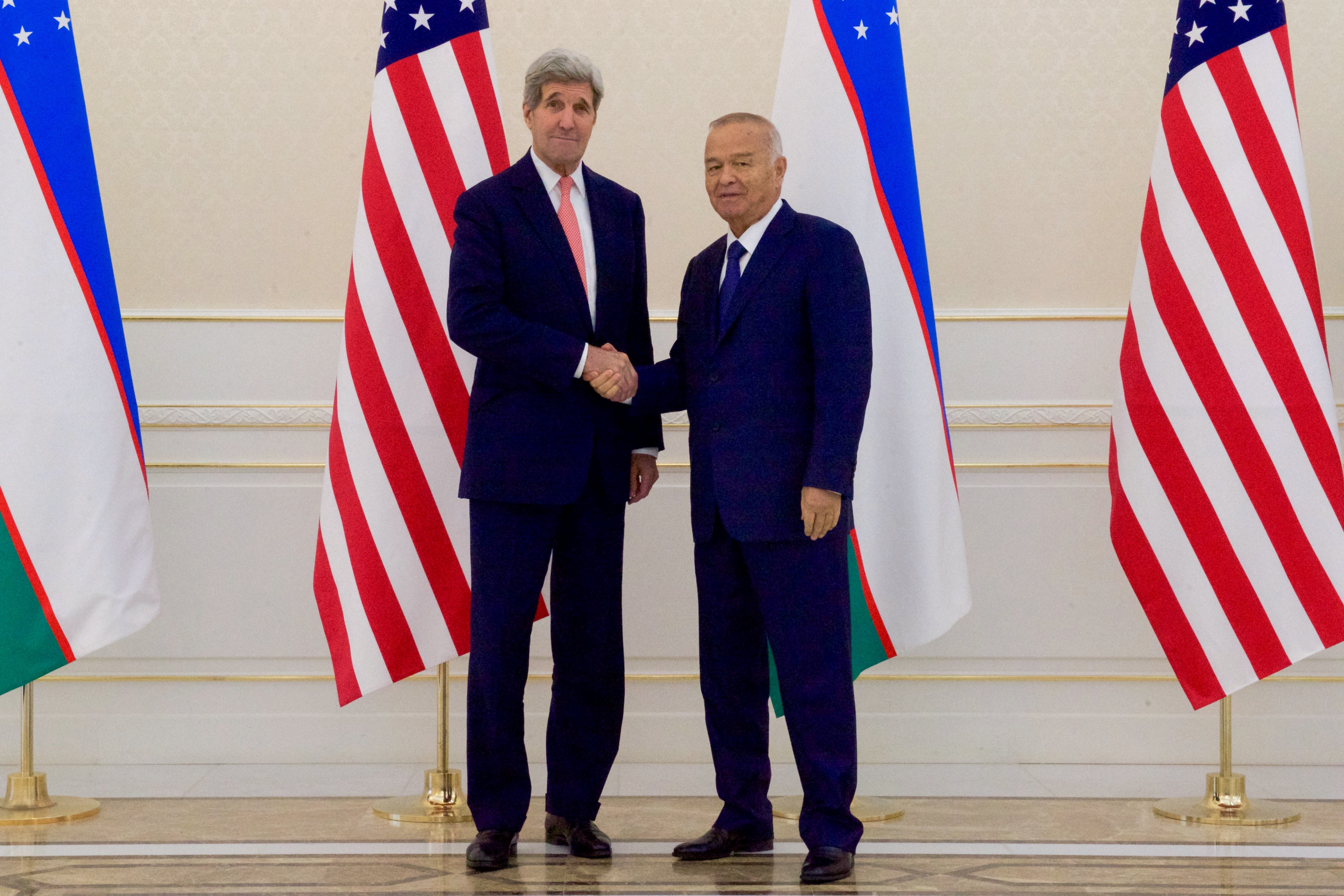
U.S. Secretary of State John Kerry with Karimov in Samarkand in November 2015

His isolationism defined foreign policy. Karimov was courted by the big powers for geopolitical leverage and Uzbekistan's gas supplies, but he kept all at arms' length, suspicious of Russia's post-colonial aims and the US-led "democratization" agenda. In 1999, he criticised the Organization for Security and Co-operation in Europe (OSCE) for paying too much attention to the protection of Human rights in Uzbekistan, rather than concentrating on the security issues facing Central Asia and the Commonwealth of Independent States (CIS). "As long as war continues in Afghanistan, the threat to peace, security and democratic reforms in the neighbouring states of Central Asia will remain, and the source of international terrorism and its expansion well beyond the region's boundaries will be preserved."

== Criticism ==
=== Human rights and press freedom ===
Western states repeatedly criticised the Karimov administration's record on human rights and press freedom. In particular, Craig Murray, the British Ambassador from 2002 to 2004, described widespread torture, kidnapping, murder, rape by the police, financial corruption, religious persecution, censorship and other human rights abuses. This included the case of Karimov's security forces executing prisoners Muzafar Avazov and Khuzniddin Alimov by boiling them alive in 2002. Murray became noted within the British government for memos disagreeing with official UK and US policy, which was at the time to back up Karimov as part of the global war on terror. Uzbekistan was used for extraordinary rendition and for the air base in Karshi-Khanabad. Murray wrote a memoir about his experiences; Murder in Samarkand, retitled Dirty Diplomacy in the United States.

The United Nations found torture "institutionalized, systematic, and rampant" in Uzbekistan's judicial system. For several years, Parade magazine selected Karimov as one of the world's worst dictators, citing his tactics of torture, media censorship and fake elections.

Karimov's Party apparatus gained effective control over the media during the immediate independence period. Because of a poor human rights and democratization record, the Karimov administration worked to improve its image by allowing broadcasts from Radio Free Europe/Radio Liberty. A tarnished record had harmed the efforts to gain greater access to developmental aid and foreign investment.

According to the Uzbek Constitution freedom of expression in the media is nominally guaranteed; Article 67 explicitly states, "Censorship is not permitted." However, under the Karimov government, all media publications had to be "held accountable for the reliability" of the information released. This "accountability" actually introduces an opportunity for government censorship, as the definition of "accountability" was left to the Karimov and now is left to the successive Presidential administration's discretion. Article 29 states that all freedom of media expression is to be allowed with the exceptions of releasing state secrets and statements against the Constitution. The printed media of Uzbekistan has a high number of publications, but is dominated by three: Khalq Sozi, its Russian edition Narodnoye Slovo, and another Russian-language publication, Pravda Vostoka. The state owns almost all media, and the State Control Inspecorate, located in Tashkent, secures tight editorial control. Topics deemed "sensitive" are not considered for publishing. A ban is in place that prevents publications that give space to "unregistered opinions". Arrests of journalists have been documented in Tashkent and Samarkand.

As a propaganda tool, the state strictly controls the tone and subject material of all published works. State censors give preference to works that provide a positive, uplifting ideology to its readers. Criticism that passes the censors is limited to low and mid-level officers. Although the Karimov regime during the 1990s assumed a greater tolerance for foreign media, the state has heavily limited foreign publications during the past decade. There has been a considerable reduction of Russian-sponsored broadcasting, and Western media has diminished in publication as well.

Banned publications under the Karimov administration included Mustaqil Haftalik and Erk, the respective publications of the Birilik and Erk opposition parties. The Karimov government charged each publication on the grounds of being "disloyal to the current regime". In December 1995, Karimov was quoted in describing local journalists as "toothless". Karimov had essentially called for more criticism in printed material, but only "approved" criticism.

In May 2002, the Karimov administration lifted the pre-publication censorship, and fined the chief censor, Ervin Kamilov. The State Inspectorate for the Protection of State Secrets was disbanded. Two days later, the administration proceeded to reinstate further censorship measures. Among topics prohibited in Uzbekistan's publications are official corruption, opposition political parties and Islamic organizations. Radio Liberty lost its broadcast rights. Uzbekistan has one state-run internet server, UZPAK, that blocks prohibited websites.

In November 2014, Uzbek students published a letter on the opposition party website, Dunyo Uzbeklari (World of Uzbeks) to protest the use of students as unpaid labour to pick the nation's cotton harvest every year.

In 2015, Karimov came under widespread criticism when he was elected to a fourth term in office from the Office for Democratic Institutions and Human Rights of the Organization for Security and Co-operation in Europe.

=== 2005 Andijan unrest ===
According to detailed accounts, on 13 May 2005, some 400 of the 500 protesters staging an anti-government demonstration were killed after being driven deliberately into a trap – authorities had blocked all the exits from Bobur Square with armoured personnel carriers, preventing people from dispersing home. Instead, they drove the crowd into a closed street, Chulpon Avenue, where snipers and police shot to kill. These scenes of deliberate killings prompted eyewitnesses to allege that troops not only shot to disperse the demonstration, but to summarily execute anyone who took part in it. Later, some tortured detainees recounted that police said they had received orders supposedly emanating from the president himself to shoot to kill.

According to Ikram Yakubov, a major in Uzbekistan's secret service who defected to Britain in 2007, the government had "propped up" the Islamist organization Akramia, which the Uzbek government blamed for fomenting the incident that led to the protests. He believes that the attacks were a pretext to repress dissenters. According to Yakubov, President Karimov personally ordered government troops to fire on the protestors.

In response to the military sanctions imposed by the US and Europe, Karimov expelled US forces from the Karshi-Khanabad Military Base.

== Personal life ==
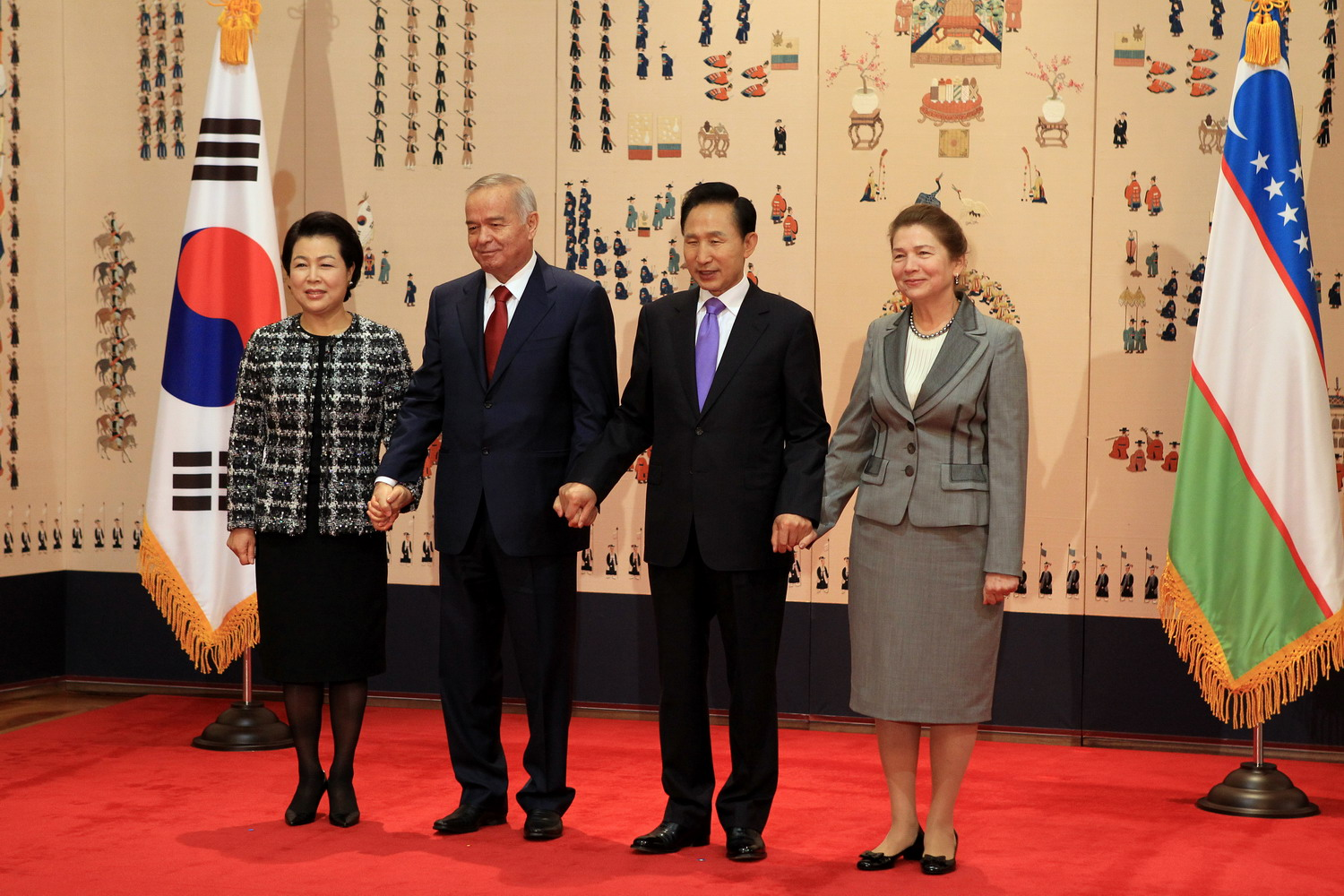
Karimov, Karimov's wife (right) and South Korean President Lee Myung-bak in Seoul, 11 February 2010

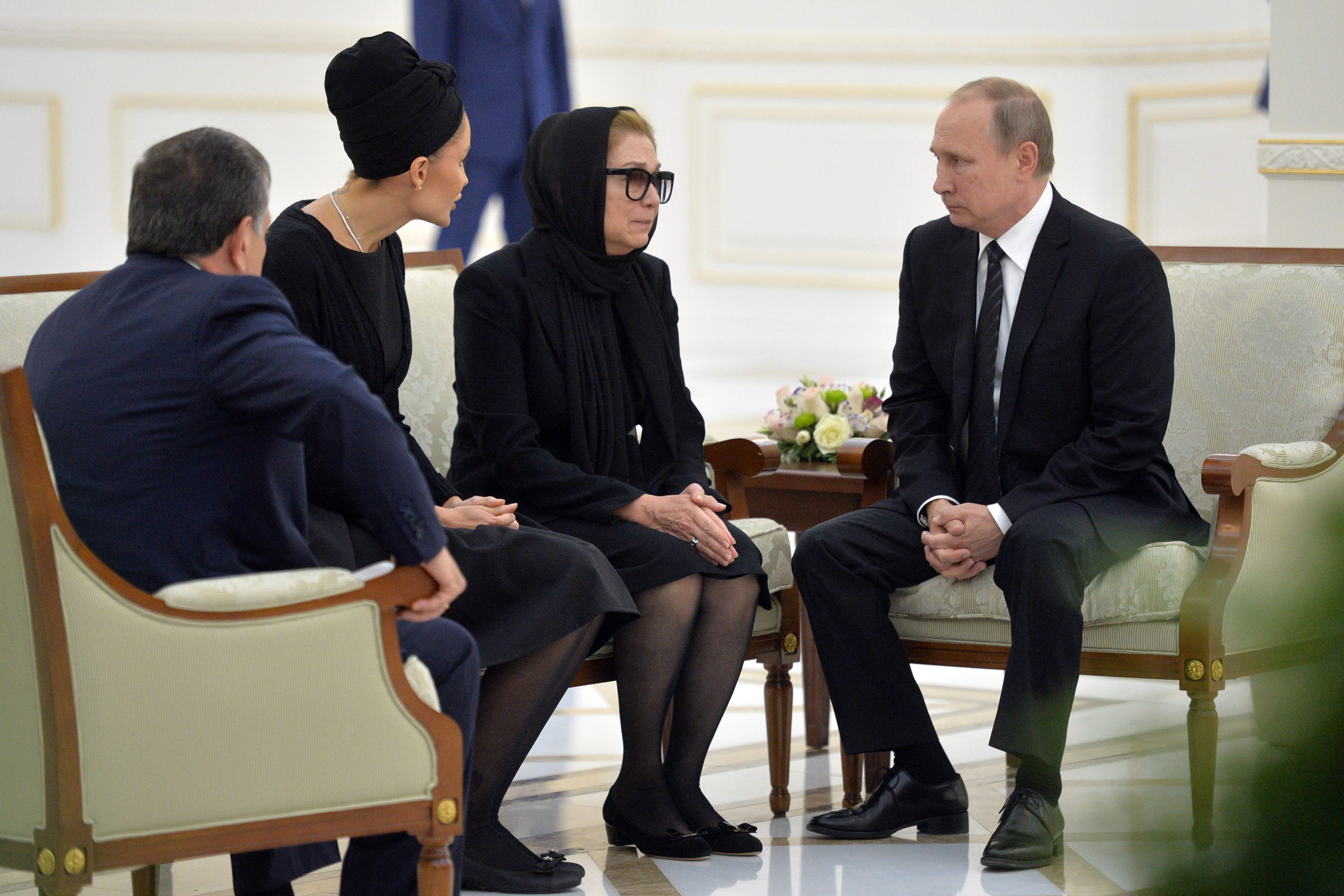
Karimov's wife Tatyana, accompanied by her daughter Lola and PM Mirziyoyev, met Russian President Putin on 6 September 2016. The absence of Gulnara Karimova is clearly visible, who had fallen from grace a few years earlier.

Karimov married his first wife, Natalya Petrovna Kuchmi, in 1964 and they had a son together, Petr, before divorcing.

Karimov's wife, Tatyana Akbarovna Karimova, whom he married in 1967, is of Tatar origin. She is an economist. They had two daughters and five grandchildren.

His elder daughter Gulnara Karimova wielded considerable influence in Uzbekistan due to business dealings related to her father's regime. She is the founder and chairperson of The Forum of Culture and Arts of Uzbekistan Foundations Board of Trustees and a number of NGOs focused on cultural and social aspects of life in Uzbekistan. She has been embroiled in corruption investigations since the decline of the Karimov regime. It has been reported that since February 2014, Gulnara has been under house arrest. She has been under investigation on charges of corruption, but has said that the "charges against her are politically motivated".

Karimov's second daughter, Lola Karimova-Tillyaeva has also been embroiled in corruption and nepotism controversies.

Karimov and his second wife Tatyana Akbarovna Karimova share five grandchildren: (Islam Karimov Jr., Iman Karimova, Mariam Tillyaeva, Umar Tillyaev, Safiya Tillyaeva).

== Illness and death ==
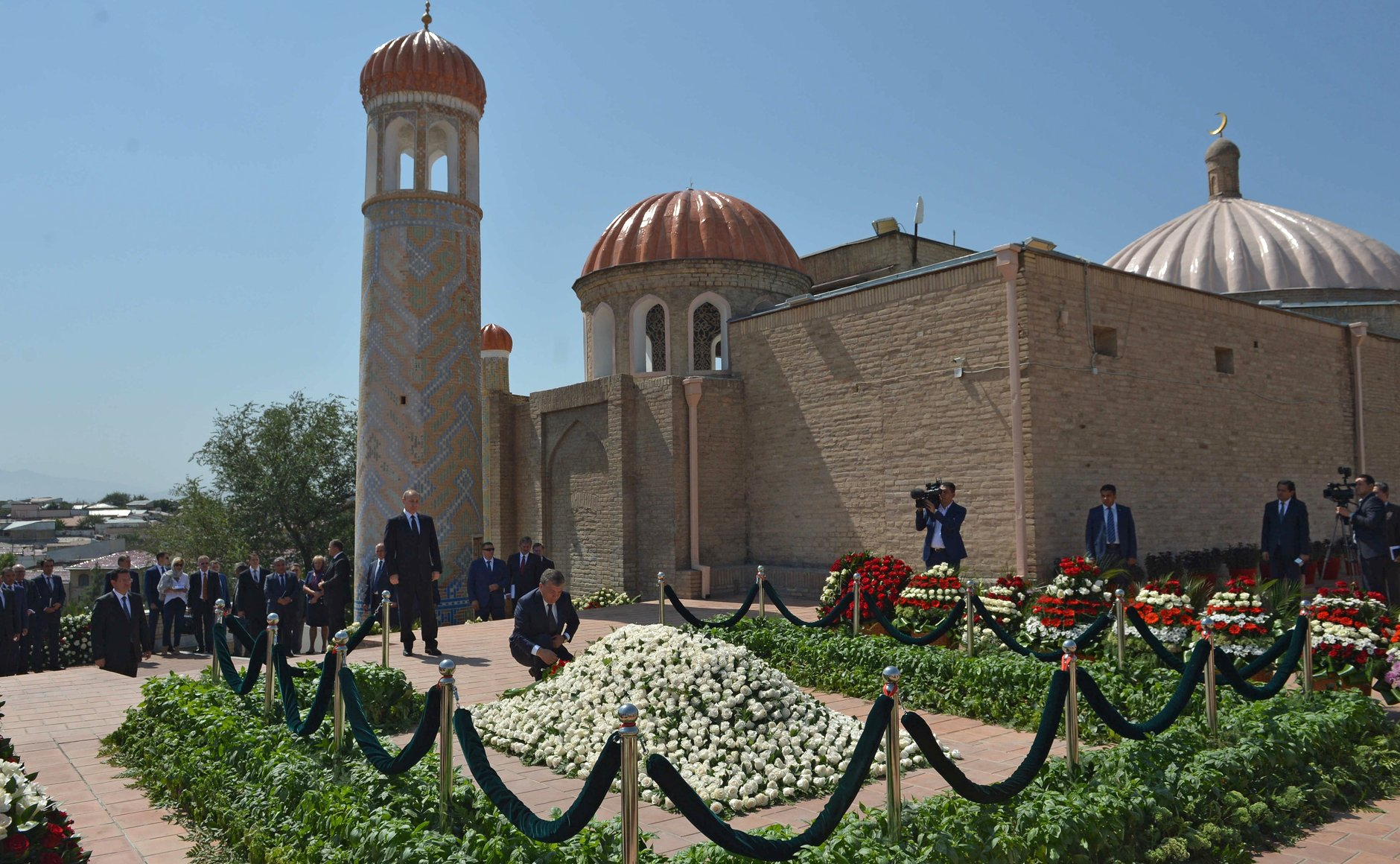
Russian President Vladimir Putin and the Prime Minister of Uzbekistan Shavkat Mirziyoyev laying flowers at the burial site of Karimov on September 6, 2016

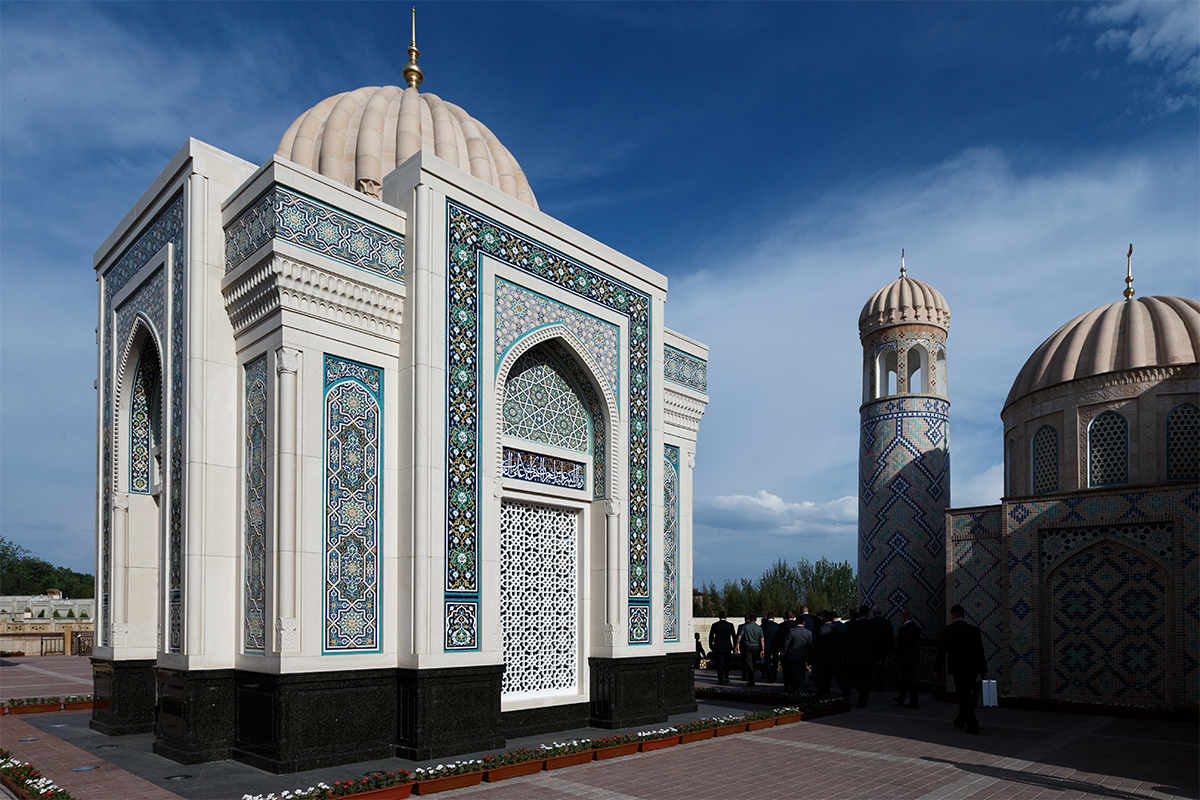
Mausoleum of Karimov

External videos
- Uzbekistan Announces The Death Of President Islam Karimov by Radio Free Europe/Radio Liberty

Karimov's health problems were a public conversation, but until 2016, Karimov's health was never discussed by government officials and any information was closely guarded. There were rumors in March 2013 that he had suffered a heart attack, which were denied.

At approximately 9 a.m. on 27 August 2016, an unconscious Karimov was taken to the Central Clinical Hospital, according to the official medical report by the government of Uzbekistan. He underwent a CT scan that revealed he had suffered a "massive subarachnoid hemorrhage" (stroke). He went into cardiac arrest but cardiac activity was restored after 20 minutes of resuscitation attempts. He was in an "atonic coma with inhibition of the functions of the brain stem" and put on a ventilator. His daughter Lola Karimova-Tillyaeva reported that he was in stable condition at an intensive care ward.

According to the official medical report, numerous experts were consulted on Karimov's condition on 27 and 28 August, including Gilles Dreyfus, medical director of the Cardiothoracic Center of Monaco; Juha Hernesniemi, professor emeritus of neurosurgery at the University of Helsinki; Amir Samii, medical director of the International Neuroscience Institute in Hannover; Hugo Katus of University Hospital Heidelberg and Leo Bokeria, the head of the Department of Cardiovascular Surgery at Moscow State Medical University.

On 29 August 2016, there were unconfirmed reports from the Ferghana News Agency, which represents the opposition, that he had died that day at 15:30 UZT. On 31 August, Karimova-Tillyaeva cited possible "recovery", thus implying that her father was still alive. On 1 September, the 25th anniversary of Uzbekistan's independence, Karimov's speech was read on TV by a presenter. Karimova-Tillyaeva stated that public support was helping him recover and pleaded with the public not to speculate on his condition.

On the morning of 2 September, it was announced that Karimov was in a "critical condition" and his condition has deteriorated sharply. A few hours later Reuters reported the death of Karimov citing three diplomatic sources. Around 16:00 UZT the Prime Minister of Turkey Binali Yıldırım expressed his condolences for the death of Karimov in a televised meeting becoming the first official to confirm the death. According to the government report, Karimov was in stable neurological condition in a coma, but progressively began to experience multiple organ failure. He suffered another cardiac arrest at 20:15 UZT on 2 September and attempts to resuscitate him failed, and he was pronounced dead at 20:55 UZT (15:55 UTC).

=== Funeral and tributes ===
After the death of Karimov, the prime minister, Shavkat Mirziyoyev, was appointed the head of the committee organizing the funeral of the president. A large number of world leaders, including the Presidents of the United States, China, Russia, and India immediately expressed their condolences. Uzbekistan declared three days of mourning and Uzbek embassies opened the book of condolences. Azeri President Ilham Aliyev, Latvian President Raimonds Vejonis, Chinese Prime Minister Li Keqiang, and Pakistani Prime Minister Nawaz Sharif visited Uzbek embassies to sign the book.

On 3 September, thousands of people lined the streets of Tashkent for Karimov's funeral procession, throwing flowers at the cortege, as he was taken to the airport to be flown to his native Samarkand, where he was buried. His funeral service was held at Registan Square, a UNESCO World Heritage site. The ceremony was attended by delegations of 17 foreign countries, including Emomali Rahmon, president of Tajikistan, Gurbanguly Berdimuhamedow, president of Turkmenistan and Ashraf Ghani, president of Afghanistan, as well as Russian Prime Minister Dmitry Medvedev, Kazakh Prime Minister Karim Massimov, Georgian Prime Minister Giorgi Kvirikashvili, Deputy Prime Minister of Turkey Yıldırım Tuğrul Türkeş, and Iranian Foreign Minister Mohammad Javad Zarif, among other various level state representatives from China, India, South Korea, Ukraine, Azerbaijan, Armenia, Japan, and the United Arab Emirates. The State Council of Cuba declared 5 September as an official day of mourning due to the death of the President of Uzbekistan.

On 6 September, Russian President Vladimir Putin arrived in Samarkand to pay tribute to Karimov. Kneeling in front of Karimov's grave, he laid a bouquet of red roses. In addition, Putin met with the relatives of the deceased and expressed condolences to them. On 12 September, Kazakh President Nursultan Nazarbayev also visited Karimov's burial site. He laid a bouquet of red roses, prayed beside his grave, and met Karimov's wife. On 6 October, Belarusian President Alexander Lukashenko paid a working visit to Uzbekistan. He laid roses to Karimov's grave, met his wife, and held talks with Interim President Mirziyoyev. Turkish Foreign Minister Mevlüt Çavuşoğlu laid a wreath at Karimov's grave on 20 October. Other high-ranking officials of Azerbaijan, India, the United Arab Emirates, as well as Under Secretary for Political Affairs of the United States Thomas Shannon also paid tribute to Karimov. On 1 November, a square in the Yakimanka district in the center of Moscow was named after Islam Karimov. Chinese Foreign Minister Wang Yi paid tribute to Karimov in Samarkand on 12 November. President of Turkey Recep Tayyip Erdoğan visited the grave of Islam Karimov on 18 November, as a part of his official visit to Uzbekistan. Kyrgyz President Almazbek Atambayev paid tribute to Karimov on 24 December, during his working visit to Uzbekistan. On 7 March 2017, Presidents of Uzbekistan and Turkmenistan Shavkat Mirziyoyev and Gurbanguly Berdimuhamedow opened the first monument of Islam Karimov in the Turkmen city of Türkmenabat. On 10 June, during his official visit to Uzbekistan, UN Secretary General António Guterres visited Karimov's grave.

== Published works ==
Year	Title (Uzbek)	English title	Publisher	Notes
1992	Oʻzbekiston: bozor munosabatlariga oʻtishning oʻziga xos yoʻli	Uzbekistan: Its Own Path of Transition to Market Relations	Oʻzbekiston Publishing House (Tashkent)	Early programmatic work outlining Uzbekistan’s transition strategy
1993	Oʻzbekiston XXI asr boʻsagʻasida: xavfsizlikka tahdid, barqarorlik shartlari va taraqqiyot kafolatlari	Uzbekistan on the Threshold of the 21st Century: Threats to Security, Conditions of Stability and Guarantees of Development	Oʻzbekiston Publishing House (Tashkent)	Major strategic work on security and development
1995	Vatan sajdagoh kabi muqaddasdir	The Motherland Is as Sacred as a Place of Worship	Oʻzbekiston Publishing House (Tashkent)	Ideological and patriotic essays
1997	Barkamol avlod – Oʻzbekiston taraqqiyotining poydevori	A Harmoniously Developed Generation Is the Foundation of Uzbekistan’s Progress	Oʻzbekiston Publishing House (Tashkent)	Education and youth policy program
1998	Yuksak maʼnaviyat – yengilmas kuch	High Spirituality Is an Invincible Force	Oʻzbekiston Publishing House (Tashkent)	Work on ideology and national values
2008	Jahon moliyaviy-iqtisodiy inqirozi, Oʻzbekiston sharoitida uni bartaraf etish yoʻllari va choralari	The Global Financial and Economic Crisis, Ways and Measures to Overcome It in Uzbekistan	Oʻzbekiston Publishing House (Tashkent)	Policy responses to the global financial crisis

== Awards ==
=== USSR ===
Order of the Red Banner of Labour
Order of Friendship of Peoples (29 January 1988)

=== Domestic ===
Hero of Uzbekistan
Order of Independence
Order of Amir Temur

=== Foreign ===
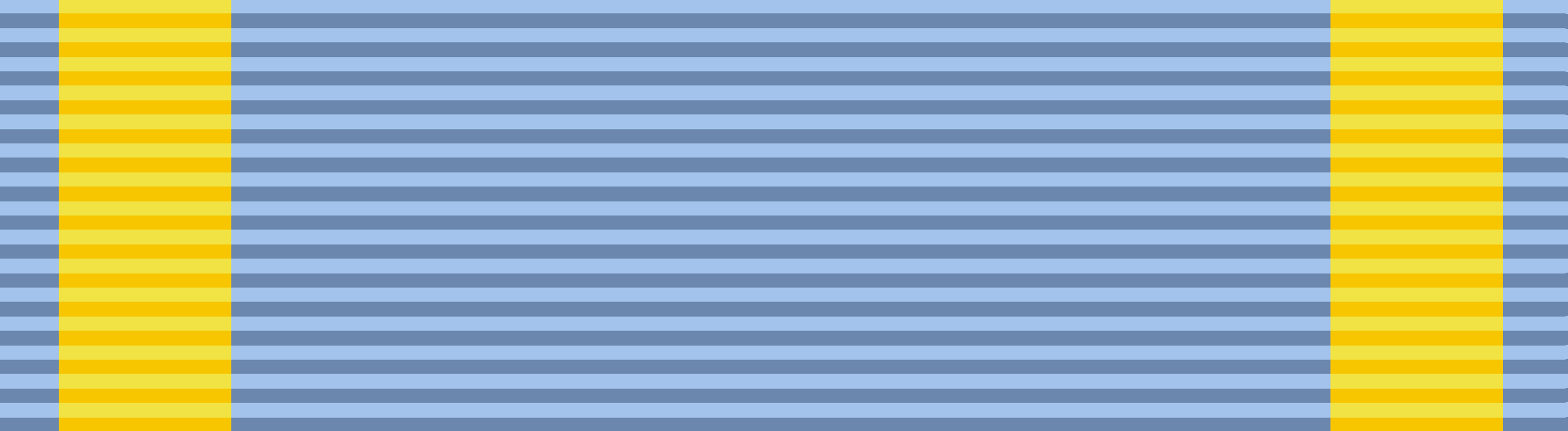
Order of the Balkan Mountains (Bulgaria)
Order of the Golden Fleece (Georgia)
Presidential Order of Excellence (Georgia, 2013)
Order of Merit of the Italian Republic (Italy, 1997)
Order of the Golden Eagle (Kazakhstan)
Golden Order in honor of the 1000th anniversary of Manas (Kyrgyzstan, 1995)
Order of the Three Stars (Latvia, 2008)
Cross of Recognition (Latvia)
Grand Cross of the Order of Vytautas the Great, 1st class (Lithuania)
Grand Cross of the Order of Merit of the Republic of Poland (Poland)
Order of the Republic of Serbia, 2nd class
Order of the Golden Fleece (Spain)
Sash of Collar of Order of Civil Merit (Spain)
Grand Order of Mugunghwa (South Korea)
Order of Prince Yaroslav the Wise, 2nd degree (Ukraine)
Order of Merit (Ukraine)
Olympic Order (International Olympic Committee)
Order of Merit (AIBA, 2016)

== See also ==
- Politics of Uzbekistan
- Jamshid Karimov
- Shavkat Mirziyoyev, 2nd President of Uzbekistan after I. Karimov

== Bibliography ==
- Bohr, Annette (1998). Uzbekistan: Politics and Foreign Policy. London: Royal Institute of International Affairs. ISBN 1-86203-081-2.
- Schatz, Edward (2006). "Access by Accident: Legitimacy Claims and Democracy Promotion in Authoritarian Central Asia". International Political Science Review. 27 (3): 263–284. doi:10.1177/0192512106064463. JSTOR 20445055. S2CID 145546950.

Party political offices
Preceded by Rafiq Nishonov	First Secretary of the Communist Party; 1989–1991	Position abolished
Political offices
New office	President of Uzbekistan; 1991–2016	Succeeded by Nigmatilla Yuldashev; Acting
